= List of Finnish films of the 1960s =

A list of films produced in Finland ordered by year of release. For an alphabetical list of Finnish films see Category:Finnish films

Title	Director	Cast	Genre	Notes
1960
Kaks' tavallista Lahtista	Ville Salminen		Musical	Entered into the 10th Berlin International Film Festival
Inspector Palmu's Mistake	Matti Kassila	Joel Rinne, Matti Ranin, Leo Jokela	Comedy	
Oho, sanoi Eemeli	Ville Salminen	Siiri Angerkoski	Comedy	
Skandaali tyttökoulussa	Edvin Laine		Comedy	Entered into the 2nd Moscow International Film Festival
1961
Little Presents	Jack Witikka		Drama	Entered into the 12th Berlin International Film Festival
Me	T.J. Särkkä	Stig Fransman, Kauko Helovirta		Jussi Award of the Best Supporting Actress (Rauha Rentola)
The Golden Calf	Ritva Arvelo	Aino Mantsas, Helge Herala	Comedy	
The Scarlet Dove	Matti Kassila		Thriller	Entered into the 11th Berlin International Film Festival
1962
The Boys	Mikko Niskanen		War	Entered into the 3rd Moscow International Film Festival
The Stars Will Tell, Inspector Palmu	Matti Kassila	Joel Rinne, Matti Ranin, Leo Jokela	Comedy	
Taape tähtenä	Armand Lohikoski	Tuija Halonen, Tarmo Manni	Comedy	
Yksityisalue	Maunu Kurkvaara		Drama	Entered into the 13th Berlin International Film Festival
1963
Meren juhlat	Maunu Kurkvaara	Sinikka Hannula	Drama	
This Summer at Five	Erkko Kivikoski		Drama	Entered into the 14th Berlin International Film Festival
1964
Make Like a Thief	Palmer Thompson, Åke Lindman	Richard Long, Åke Lindman, Pirkko Mannola	Crime	Co-produced with the United States
Onnelliset leikit	Aito Mäkinen, Esko Elstelä		Comedy	Entered into the 4th Moscow International Film Festival
X-Paroni		Spede Pasanen	Comedy	
1965
4x4	Palle Kjærulff-Schmidt, Klaus Rifbjerg, Rolf Clemens, Maunu Kurkvaara, Jan Troell	Niels Barfoed, Robert Broberg	Drama	
Onnenpeli	Risto Jarva	Merja Alanen	Comedy, Drama	
1966
Millipilleri	Ere Kokkonen, Spede Pasanen	Spede Pasanen, Hannes Häyrinen, Simo Salminen	Comedy	
Under Your Skin	Mikko Niskanen	Kirsti Wallasvaara, Eero Melasniemi, Kristiina Halkola, Pekka Autiovuori	Drama	
1967
The Diary of a Worker	Risto Jarva	Elina Salo, Paul Osipow, Titta Karakorpi	Drama	Entered into the 5th Moscow International Film Festival
Pähkähullu Suomi	Jukka Virtanen	Spede Pasanen	Comedy	
Oppenheimerin tapaus	Timo Bergholm	Matti Oravisto, Tauno Söder, Toivo Mäkelä	Drama	
1968
Black on White	Jörn Donner	Kristiina Halkola, Liisamaija Laaksonen	Drama	
Here, Beneath the North Star	Edvin Laine	Aarno Sulkanen, Titta Karakorpi	Drama	Entered into the 6th Moscow International Film Festival
Noin seitsemän veljestä	Jukka Virtanen	Spede Pasanen	Comedy	
1969
Näköradiomiehen ihmeelliset siekailut (The Marvellous Adventures of a TV Man)	Ere Kokkonen	Spede Pasanen, Vesa-Matti Loiri	Comedy	
Time of Roses	Risto Jarva	Arto Tuominen, Ritva Vepsä	Sci-fi	
