= The Millionaire Recruit =

- Directed by: Matti Kassila
- Written by: Kaarlo Nuorvala
- Produced by: Mauno Mäkelä
- Starring: Lasse Pöysti; Sakari Halonen; Pentti Viljanen
- Cinematography: Ensio Suominen; Esko Töyri
- Edited by: Nils Holm
- Music by: Usko Kemppi
- Production company: Fennada-Filmi
- Distributed by: Fenno-Filmi
- Release date: 3 July 1953
- Running time: 80 minutes
- Country: Finland
- Language: Finnish

The Millionaire Recruit (Finnish: Miljonäärimonni) is a 1953 Finnish comedy film directed by Roland af Hällström and starring Lasse Pöysti, Sakari Halonen and Pentti Viljanen.

== Cast ==
- Sakari Halonen as Recruit Miettunen
- Heikki Heino as Captain Mänty
- Mauri Jaakkola as Corporal
- Eero Leväluoma as Lieutenant colonel
- Airi Pihlajamaa as Captain Mänty's girlfriend
- Lasse Pöysti as Vihuri
- Elvi Saarnio as Miina
- Heikki Savolainen as Mönkkö
- Veikko Sorsakivi
- Reino Valkama as General Peltomies
- Toini Vartiainen as Toini
- Pentti Viljanen as Sergeant Kulkunen
- Kauko Vuorensola as Recruit

== Bibliography ==
- Qvist, Per Olov & von Bagh, Peter. Guide to the Cinema of Sweden and Finland. Greenwood Publishing Group, 2000.
