= Inspector Palmu's Mistake =

Inspector Palmu's Mistake may refer to:

- Inspector Palmu's Mistake (novel), 1940
- Inspector Palmu's Mistake (film), 1960

== See also ==
- Inspector Palmu, the title character
