= Trust (1976 film) =

- Original Finnish film poster.
- Directed by: Edvin Laine; Viktor Tregubovich
- Written by: Väinö Linna; Vladlen Loginov; Mikhail Shatrov
- Produced by: Ilmo Mäkelä; Mauno Mäkelä; Nikolai Yeliseyev
- Starring: Kirill Lavrov; Vilho Siivola
- Cinematography: Dmitriy Meskhiev
- Edited by: Margarita Shadrina
- Music by: Georgy Sviridov
- Production companies: Fennada-Filmi; Lenfilm Studio
- Distributed by: Fenno-Filmi
- Release date: 21 April 1976
- Running time: 95 minutes
- Countries: Finland; Soviet Union
- Language: Finnish / Russian

Trust (Finnish: Luottamus; Russian: Доверие, romanized: Doverie) is a 1976 Finnish-Soviet historical drama film directed by Edvin Laine and Viktor Tregubovich. The film portrays the events leading up to the Finnish Declaration of Independence from Russia in 1917 and especially the role of Soviet leader Vladimir Lenin in them. The main roles are played by Kirill Lavrov as Lenin and Vilho Siivola as P. E. Svinhufvud.

Edvin Laine received the state film artist award for the film, and Vilho Siivola received the Jussi Award for best actor. At the Riga Film Festival in 1977, the film was awarded a special jury prize for artistic merit in depicting the beginning stages of peaceful coexistence between two neighboring countries. After completion, the film was shown in schools as an educational film, but it did not do very well in cinemas. According to the current general perception, it strongly represents the spirit of the era of Finlandization between Finland and the Soviet Union.

== Plot ==
Trust takes place at the end of December 1917, when the Finnish delegation has traveled to St. Petersburg to seek recognition for the Finland's independence. Finnish Prime Minister P. E. Svinhufvud with diplomats Carl Enckell and Gustaf Idman has to decide whether to seek recognition of independence from the Bolshevik government, and Bolshevik leader V. I. Lenin has to choose accordingly whether to recognize the independence of bourgeois Finland. The main part of the plot consists of flashback scenes, which on the one hand describe the central events of Finland's struggle for autonomy and independence, and on the other hand the shaping of Lenin's nationality policy and personal relationship with Finland in the years 1899–1917.

The film shows, among other things, the following historical events: the Finnish mission bringing the Great Petition is rejected in St. Petersburg in 1899; Eugen Schauman shoots Governor General Nikolai Bobrikov in 1904; Lenin wanders in the Turku archipelago on weak ice after escaping from Finland in 1907; Vladimir Purishkevich delivers the famous "Finis Finlandiae!" (Latin for "The End for Finland!") in the Russian Duma in 1910; Parliament led by Speaker Svinhufvud refuses to accept national legislation in 1910; the parliament led by Speaker Kullervo Manner convenes in the fall of 1917 despite the dissolution order; Lenin hides in Helsinki with Kustaa Rovio in the fall of 1917; Kullervo Manner, Yrjö Sirola and K. H. Wiik attend Lenin's speeches in December 1917; and finally Lenin's government gives the document of recognition of independence to the Svinhufvud delegation in December 1917.

At the end of the film, a clip of a newsreel from the 1975 Helsinki OSCE meeting is attached.

== Partial cast ==
- Kirill Lavrov as V. I. Lenin
- Vladimir Tatosov as Yakov Sverdlov
- Igor Dmitriev as Vladimir Bonch-Bruyevich
- Margarita Terekhova as Aleksandra Kollontai
- Antonina Shuranova as Rosa Luxemburg
- Leonhard Merzin as Jukka Rahja
- Anatoly Solonitsyn as Alexander Shotman
- Leonid Nevedomsky as Mikhail Pokrovsky
- Alexey Eybozhenko as Nikolai Krylenko
- Oleg Yankovsky as Georgy Pyatakov
- Vilho Siivola as Pehr Evind Svinhufvud
- Yrjö Tähtelä as Carl Enckell
- Yrjö Pavloff as Gustaf Idman
- Esa Saario as Kullervo Manner
- Innokenty Smoktunovsky as Nikolay Bobrikov
- Matti Ranin as Eugen Wolff

== Bibliography ==
- Rollberg, Peter. Historical Dictionary of Russian and Soviet Cinema. Scarecrow Press, 2008.
- Öhman, Mia. Luottamus – kinoleninianaa parhaasta päästä. Filmihullu, 6/2017. (in Finnish)
