= Inspector Palmu's Mistake (film) =

1960 crime comedy film by Matti Kassila

Komisario Palmun erehdys
- Original Finnish film poster
- Directed by: Matti Kassila
- Written by: Matti Kassila; Kaarlo Nuorvala
- Based on: Inspector Palmu's Mistake by Mika Waltari
- Produced by: Toivo Särkkä
- Starring: Joel Rinne; Matti Ranin; Leo Jokela; Jussi Jurkka; Leevi Kuuranne; Elina Pohjanpää
- Cinematography: Olavi Tuomi
- Edited by: Elmer Lahti
- Music by: Osmo Lindeman
- Production company: SF-Filmi
- Distributed by: Suomen Filmiteollisuus
- Release date: 9 September 1960 (Finland)
- Running time: 103 minutes
- Country: Finland
- Language: Finnish

Komisario Palmun erehdys (Swedish title: Mysteriet Rygseck; international titles: Inspector Palmu's Mistake or Inspector Palmu's Error; US DVD title: The Rygseck Mystery) is a 1960 Finnish crime comedy film directed by Matti Kassila for Suomen Filmiteollisuus. It is set in 1930s Helsinki and centers on Inspector Palmu's investigation of the murder of rich and decadent Bruno Rygseck. It is based on Mika Waltari's 1940 novel of the same name, and was the first film adaptation of his Inspector Palmu novels.

The film was premiered on September 9, 1960, and at the time of its premiere, the film was already a great success with both audiences and critics. It has enjoyed great popularity over the years, and in 2012, it was voted the best Finnish film of all time by Finnish film critics, journalists and bloggers in a poll organized by Yle Uutiset. The film was also shown at the Tampere Film Festival in 1999.

The film was followed by three sequels, Gas, Inspector Palmu! (1961), The Stars Will Tell, Inspector Palmu (1962) and Vodka, Inspector Palmu (1969), which were produced by a different studio, Fennada-Filmi, but directed by Kassila and featured the same core cast.

== Plot ==
The film opens with a scene of guests arriving at the crime-themed dinner party of Bruno Rygseck, the rich and decadent heir of the Rykämö concern. The guests are his cousins Airi and Aimo Rykämö, Airi's fiancé Erik Vaara, who works for the concern and strongly dislikes Bruno, and Irma Vanne, the daughter of vuorineuvos Vanne. In order to scare them as they arrive, Bruno has dressed up as the Grim Reaper.

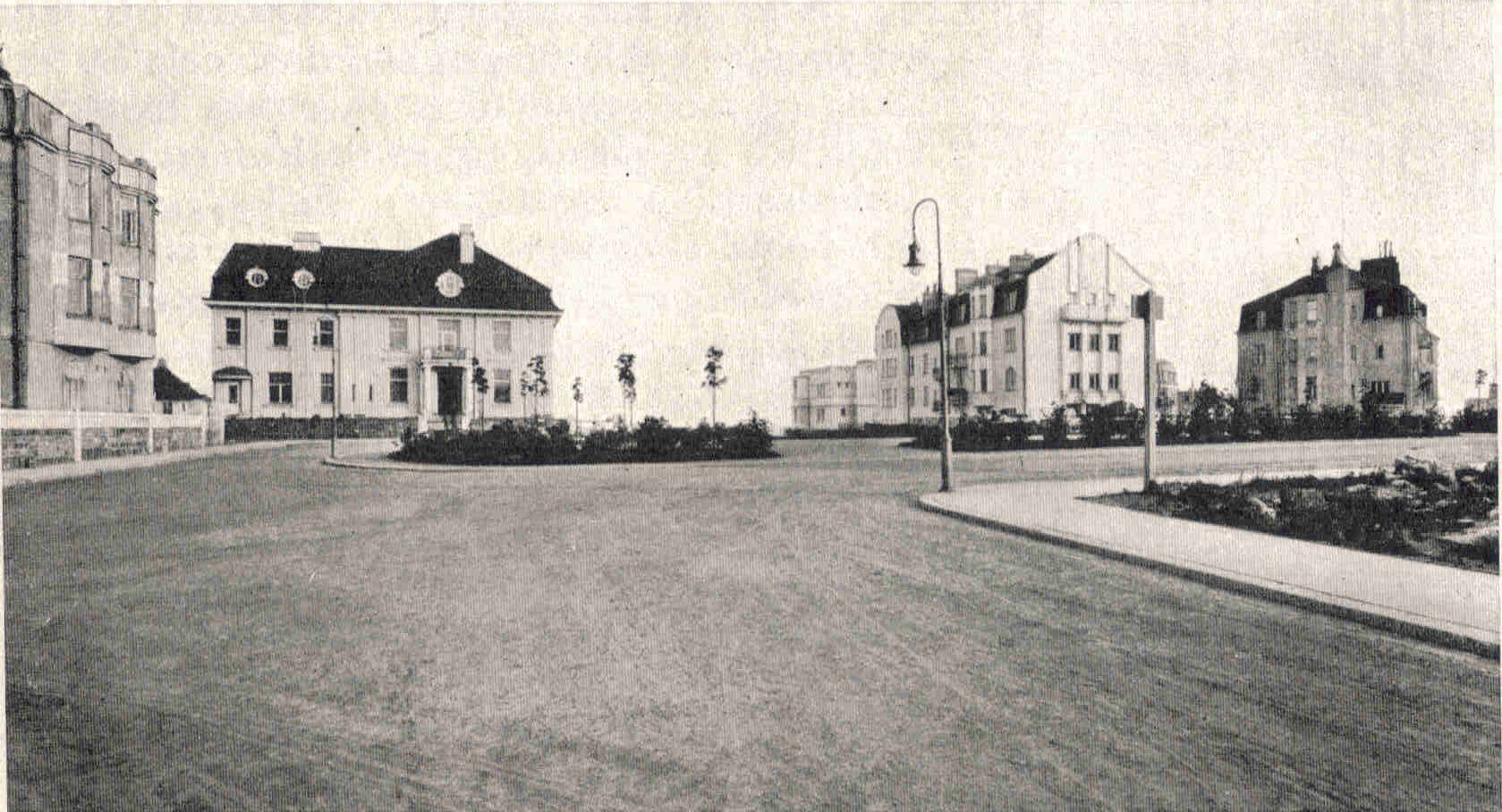
Engelinaukio in Eira, Helsinki, photographed in 1915. The second building from the left was used for the exterior shots of Bruno Rygseck's townhouse.

The next morning, inspector Frans J. Palmu and detectives Virta and Kokki are informed that Bruno has drowned in his indoor swimming pool after slipping on a bar of soap. They head to the Rygseck house to conduct a routine investigation. The party guests (with the exception of Vanne), as well as Bruno's aunt Amalia Rygseck and his estranged wife Alli Rygseck, are present at the house, as all of them had had something to discuss with Bruno that morning. As Palmu inspects the bathroom, he begins to suspect that Bruno was in fact murdered. When the policemen are shown around the house by Bruno's manservant, Veijonen, they find Vanne and famous author K.V. Laihonen engrossed in lively conversation in the basement. They are oblivious to the morning's events, as they had entered the house through the back door when coke was delivered in the early morning and have since been in the basement. Although Laihonen does not know Bruno or Vanne from before, he had been invited to the house by her to get back the stolen manuscript of his unpublished novel.

The atmosphere in the house becomes increasingly hostile towards the investigation as Palmu asks more detailed questions about the morning's events. He learns that the previous night, Aimo had stolen Amalia's cat and brought it with him to the dinner party, where Bruno had poisoned it and invited her to view the cadaver for his amusement. Despite Palmu's suspicions, the investigation is closed due to pressure from the powerful Rygsecks and because there is no evidence to prove that the death was anything other than an accident. Laihonen asks the policemen and Vanne to join him at the luxurious Hotel Kämp for a late lunch.

At Kämp, Vanne tells the policemen more about the previous night. They had been playing a game in which each contestant had to commit a crime that the victim could not report to the police. The winner was to be chosen by Vaara at the party. Her crime had been to steal the manuscript; Aimo's to steal the cat; and Airi's to have ten of Aimo's promissory notes signed by Bruno. She had refused to reveal how she had gotten them, other than that it was blackmail. Bruno had then asked Vaara to come to his bedroom in order to show him his crime in private. Afterwards, Vaara had stormed out of the house in fury, after stating that Bruno had won the contest.

When Palmu and the detectives arrive back at the police station late in the afternoon, they are told that Alli Rygseck has been poisoned with prussic acid mixed in her absinthe. She had been back at the Rygseck house to discuss with the family members who was to inherit from Bruno: she had insisted that she should get the house. Bruno's case is now also re-opened, and the policemen head back to the house. Palmu interrogates Airi about the promissory notes, and she reveals that Aimo had been forging Bruno's signature to pay off his gambling debts. Bruno had told her that he would contact the police about it unless she were to agree to do something, although she refuses to specify exactly what. In Bruno's bedroom, Palmu finds an album of nude photographs he had taken of his female friends, with one page torn off.

That evening, the policemen meet Bruno's uncle Gunnar Rygseck, the head of the Rykämö concern, at his office. He tries to bribe Palmu and claims that Bruno was suicidal and had intended the poisoned absinthe for himself before dying accidentally. Next, Palmu confronts Vaara, whose office is in the same building, about what Bruno showed him. It is revealed to have been a nude photograph of Airi, which Palmu notices is a forgery. He tells Vaara that Aimo killed Bruno and that Airi will be imprisoned as an accomplice as she has tried to protect her brother: this leads Vaara to confess to Bruno's murder. Palmu asks for Airi, who also works for the concern, to come to Vaara's office. She confirms that the photograph is forged, and finds the idea that her brother killed Bruno laughable. Vaara takes back his confession, and Palmu admits that he never truly believed either him or Aimo to be the murderer.

Palmu calls the Rygseck house, where Amalia is moving in, and is told by her that Veijonen has disappeared. Palmu goes to interrogate Vanne again, and she confesses to having secretly stayed in Alli Rygseck's old bedroom on the night of the party. When she walked through the corridor leading to the bathroom the next morning in order to get to the back door, she thought that a stair creaked behind her, as if someone else was there as well. Palmu places her under house arrest at Laihonen's apartment.

In order to get the murderer to act, Palmu sends detective Virta to tell all the suspects that Vanne knows something about the murders. He is also to get Bruno's photo album from the Rygseck house and to go show it to Vanne. At the house, Amalia convinces Virta to give her his gun for protection as she is scared of Veijonen. When Virta returns to the station, he learns that Veijonen has been caught and is cleared of the murders. Soon after, Palmu calls Laihonen and asks to speak to Vanne. He admits that she has gone to help Amalia search the house – he had lied to the gullible Virta earlier that she was asleep. The police rush back to the Rygseck house, and stop Amalia from shooting Vanne. In the struggle, Virta is shot in the shoulder.

In the final scene, it is revealed that Amalia has been mentally ill for some time and that she murdered Bruno as revenge for killing her cat. The murder weapon was her umbrella with a sturdy wooden handle that she always carried with her. As she is elderly and not of sound mind, she is not prosecuted but is left to the care of her brother.

== Cast ==
- Joel Rinne as Inspector Frans J. Palmu
- Matti Ranin as Detective Toivo Virta
- Leo Jokela as Detective Väinö Kokki
- Jussi Jurkka as Bruno Rygseck
- Saara Ranin as Amalia Rygseck
- Elina Salo as Airi Rykämö
- Pentti Siimes as Aimo Rykämö
- Leevi Kuuranne as Veijonen
- Elina Pohjanpää as Irma Vanne
- Matti Oravisto as Erik Vaara
- Leo Riuttu as K. V. Laihonen
- Aino Mantsas as Alli Rygseck
- Arvo Lehesmaa as Gunnar Rygseck
- Risto Mäkelä as Police chief Hagert
- Pentti Irjala as Doctor Dahlberg
- Toivo Mäkelä as Pianist at Hotel Kämp
- Irja Rannikko as Bruno's cook
- Anton Soini as Coke delivery man
- Arttu Suuntala as Driver of coke truck

Uncredited

- Kaarlo Wilska as a policeman
- Oiva Luhtala as a policeman
- Arno Carlstedt as a man in Café Kappeli
- Leo Lastumäki as a carpenter
- Tauno Söder as a crime scene investigator
- Leo Pentti as a crime scene investigator
- Paavo Hukkinen as a crime scene investigator
- Arvo Kuusla as a crime scene investigator
- Rose-Marie Precht as a girl in Bruno's swimming pool
- Katriina Rinne as a girl in Bruno's swimming pool
- Esko Salminen as a boy in Bruno's swimming pool
- Eero Maijala as a boy in Bruno's swimming pool
- Orma Aunio as a boy in Bruno's swimming pool

== See also ==
- List of films considered the best
- Inspector Palmu's Mistake (novel)
