= Fennada-Filmi =

Finnish film production company

- Industry: Motion pictures
- Founded: 1950
- Defunct: 1982
- Key people: Mauno Mäkelä; Roland af Hällström; Matti Kassila

Fennada-Filmi was a Finnish film production company which was in operation from 1950 to 1982. It was one of the largest companies in its field in Finland from 1950s to 1970s. Mauno Mäkelä was the head of the company during its entire run.

== Beginning ==
Fennada-Filmi had its foundation in the company Fenno-Filmi, which was founded in 1942 and produced 15 movies between 1944–1950. When Mauno Mäkelä was named the CEO of the company in 1949, arrangements began to combine productions of Fenno-Filmi and Adams Filmi. New company Fennada-Filmi went active in the summer of 1950, and only the distributing duties remained for Adams Filmi. Mäkelä continued as the managing director and production manager of the new company.

== 1950–1960 ==
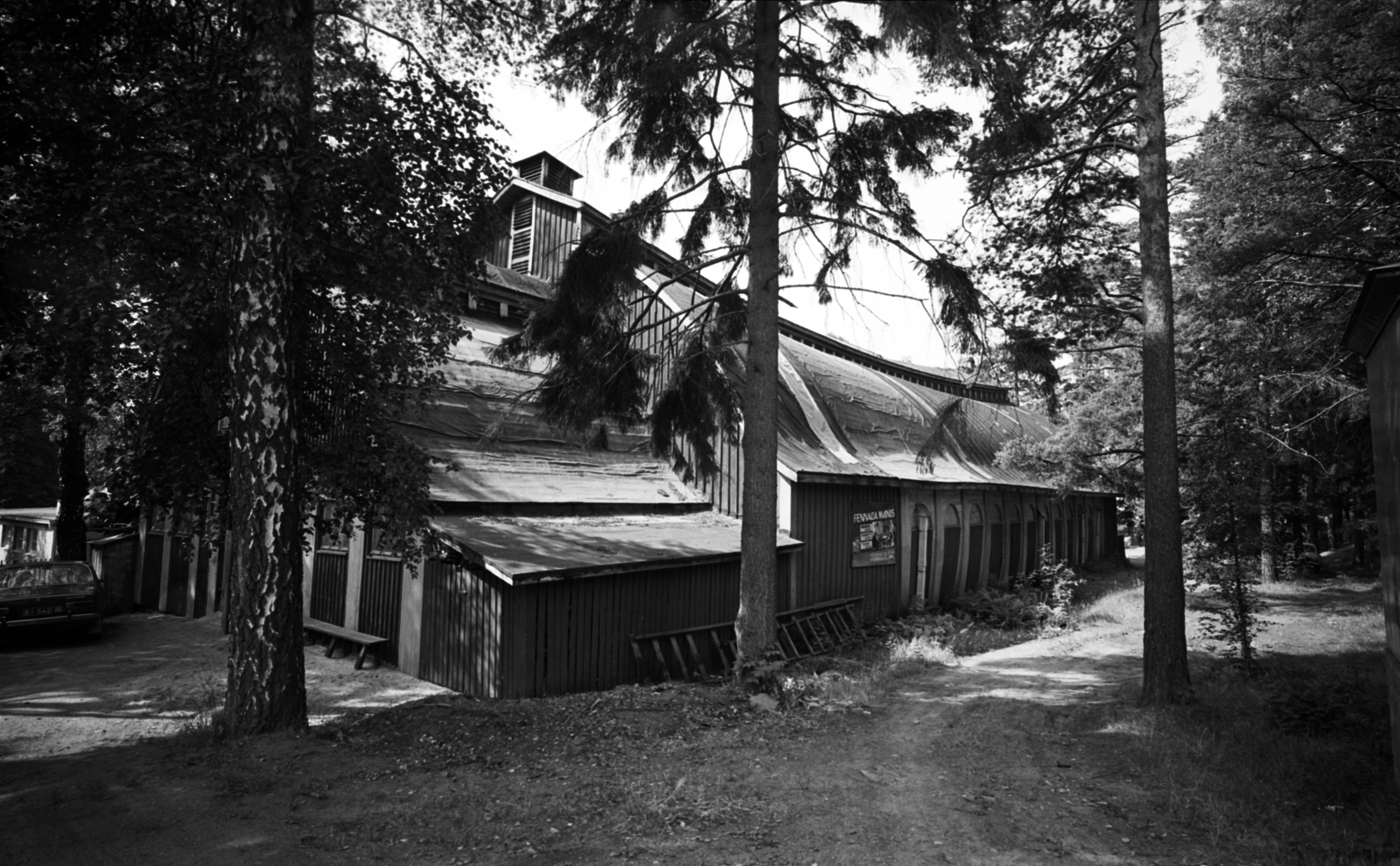
The Fennada-Filmi studio, a former indoors tennis court, in Kulosaari, Helsinki, taken into film use ca. 1950, photographed here in 1971.

The final film for Fenno-Filmi, Hallin Janne by Roland af Hällström, was finished in the summer of 1950. At the same time, shooting began for Fennada-Filmi's first production Ratavartijan kaunis Inkeri, directed by Hannu Leminen. In 1952, Lasse Pöysti joined the company as a director, and made a total of eight films during the next years. Director Ville Salminen switched from Suomen Filmiteollisuus to Fennada-Filmi in 1953, and the next year Aarne Tarkas joined in as well.

In 1955, Hällström directed Fennada-Filmi's first commercial success, Ryysyrannan Jooseppi which received three Jussi Awards. When Hällström died the next year, Mauno Mäkelä hired Matti Kassila as his replacement. Kassila's first Fennada-Filmi production was Elokuu (1956). Although the film received critical acclaim and won six Jussi Awards, it was not a commercial success. However, Kassila's next two films, Kuriton sukupolvi (1957) and Syntipukki (1957) – both remakes of the 1930s Finnish films – did well at the box office.

== 1960–1982 ==
Since the beginning, Fennada-Filmi had suffered from lack of new ideas and resorted to remakes, while also keeping up the fast production pace. In 1961, two successful films premiered, Ritva Arvelo's Kultainen vasikka and Matti Kassila's Kaasua, komisario Palmu!, which was a sequel to Kassila's Komisario Palmun erehdys (1960). That film had been produced by Suomen Filmiteollisuus, but Mauno Mäkelä managed to get the rights to the sequel.

Robert Balser, an American animator, established Fennada-Filmi's animation department.

The fate of Fennada-Filmi was at stake with the actors' strike in 1963, and a plan was made to sell the company to the Finnish Broadcasting Company. This, however, proved to be a very controversial move, and the deal was cancelled. Throughout the mid-1960s, new films went into production only infrequently.

In the fall of 1966, shooting began for a film adaptation of a Väinö Linna's Täällä Pohjantähden alla. Directed by Edvin Laine, the film premiered in the fall of 1968 and was a commercial success. The sequel Akseli and Elina also did well when it was released in 1970. Only five more films were released by Fennada-Filmi, with Laine's Ruskan jälkeen (1979) being the final one. In 1982, the Finnish Broadcasting Company bought the company, which marked the end of its run.

== Films produced by Fennada-Filmi ==
=== 1950s ===
- Ratavartijan kaunis Inkeri (1950)
- Ylijäämänainen (1951)
- Tukkijoella (1951)
- ...ja Helena soittaa (1952)
- Suomalaistyttöjä Tukholmassa (1952)
- Kaikkien naisten monni (1952)
- Noita palaa elämään (1952)
- Salakuljettajan laulu (1952)
- Saariston tyttö (1953)
- Kolmiapila (1953)
- Kaksi hauskaa vekkulia (1953)
- Miljonäärimonni (1953)
- Lumikki ja 7 jätkää (1953)
- Kuningas kulkureitten (1953)
- Alaston malli karkuteillä (1953)
- Kovanaama (1954)
- Kummituskievari (1954)
- Laivaston monnit maissa (1954)
- Putkinotko (1954)
- Olemme kaikki syyllisiä (1954)
- Laivan kannella (1954)
- Näkemiin Helena (1954)
- Ryysyrannan Jooseppi (1955)
- Sankarialokas (1955)
- Säkkijärven polkka (1955)
- Villi Pohjola (1955)
- Poika eli kesäänsä (1955)
- Lain mukaan (1956)
- Jokin ihmisessä (1956)
- Tyttö lähtee kasarmiin (1956)
- Evakko (1956)
- Yli merten ja mannerten (1956)
- Elokuu (1956)
- Rintamalotta (1956)
- Anu ja Mikko (1956)
- Pää pystyyn Helena (1957)
- Kuriton sukupolvi (1957)
- Taas tyttö kadoksissa! (1957)
- Vääpelin kauhu (1957)
- Syntipukki (1957)
- Kulkurin masurkka (1958)
- Asessorin naishuolet (1958)
- Paksunahka (1958)
- Sotapojan heilat (1958)
- Punainen viiva (1959)
- Iskelmäketju (1959)

=== 1960s ===
- Justus järjestää kaiken(1960)
- Kaasua, komisario Palmu! (1961)
- Kultainen vasikka (1961)
- Tähdet kertovat, komisario Palmu (1962)
- Hermoprässi (1963)
- Sissit (1963)
- Hopeaa rajan takaa (1963)
- Täällä alkaa seikkailu (1965)
- Rakkaus alkaa aamuyöstä (1966)
- Täällä Pohjantähden alla (1968)
- Vodkaa, komisario Palmu (1969)
- Kesyttömät veljekset (1969)

=== 1970s ===
- Akseli and Elina (1970)
- Aatamin puvussa... ja vähän Eevankin (1971)
- Pohjantähti (1973)
- Meiltähän tämä käy (1973)
- Luottamus (1976)
- Ruskan jälkeen (1979)

== See also ==
- Elonet.fi – Fennada-Filmi

== Sources ==
- Mäkelä, Mauno (1996). Kerrankin hyvä kotimainen: elokuvatuottajan muistelmat. Porvoo, Helsinki, Juva: WSOY. ISBN 951-0-20956-2.
- Uusitalo, Kari (1989–1999). Suomen kansallisfilmografia 4–8. Helsinki: VAPK, Edita, Suomen elokuva-arkisto.
