= Gas, Inspector Palmu! =

1961 crime comedy film by Matti Kassila

- DVD cover
- Directed by: Matti Kassila
- Written by: Matti Kassila; Kaarlo Nuorvala; Mika Waltari (novel)
- Produced by: Mauno Mäkelä
- Starring: Joel Rinne; Matti Ranin; Leo Jokela; Elina Salo; Pentti Siimes
- Cinematography: Esko Nevalainen; Erkko Kivikoski
- Edited by: Ossi Skurnik
- Music by: Osmo Lindeman
- Distributed by: Fennada-Filmi
- Release date: 1961
- Running time: 94 minutes
- Country: Finland
- Language: Finnish

Gas, Inspector Palmu! (original Finnish title: Kaasua, komisario Palmu!) is a 1961 Finnish crime movie directed by Matti Kassila. It is a sequel to Inspector Palmu's Mistake and is followed by The Stars Will Tell, Inspector Palmu. The main cast of actors is the same as that of the first though some actors such as Elina Salo, Pentti Siimes and Aino Mantsas play different characters.

It is based on the first Inspector Palmu novel Who Murdered Mrs. Skrof? (Kuka murhasi rouva Skrofin?) by Mika Waltari but was the second one filmed, after Inspector Palmu's Mistake. Unlike the first film it was produced by Fennada-Filmi. According to director Kassila, Toivo Särkkä (the producer of the first film) didn't like the story of the novel and thus its rights were purchased by Fennada producer Mauno Mäkelä, who also produced the third movie The Stars Will Tell, Inspector Palmu (1962). The film features the first character in Finnish cinema history who is a homosexual: the artist Kurt Kuurna.

== Synopsis ==
Mrs. Skrof, a wealthy and hated woman belonging to a religious sect, is found dead in her apartment. She died apparently from inhaling gas leaking from her cooker while under the influence of sleep-medication. Several details of the case lead Inspector Palmu to suspect that she was murdered, including a crooked soup pot, her unusually strong sleeping pills and the fact her dog has been killed by breaking its neck.

The murderer is revealed to be Kurt Kuurna. Although all the evidence points to Kaarle Lankela, the attempted suicide and false but accurate confession made by Kirsti Skrof (taken from details that were given to her by Virta) causes the whole affair to become untangled.

Palmu's suspicions about Kuurna are aroused due to his unusually proactive involvement in the murder case as well for delivering Kirsti's suicide note, which at first glance doesn't appear to concern him. After Kirsti's suicide attempt Kuurna is put under police watch. When he shines the light on a hanged mannequin on his window the police and Palmu first suspect he has killed himself. Kurt reveals himself to be the killer with his gruesome portrait of Palmu (where Palmu is depicted as Janus) where he accidentally painted the tipped pot over the gas-cooker, a detail only the murderer would have known.

The climax is heavily indicative that Kuurna is homosexual but the motives of the murder are also tied to the story about his ancestor's surrender of a horse to the King of Sweden. This similarity spotted by Virta late into the film believing that Kuurna has turned the event into a metaphor for his own motives. Though Palmu initially dismisses the idea, he later confronts Kuurna with the theory. It is revealed that Kurt had feelings for Kaarle and intended to have him framed for the murder in order to save him, believing the police could not establish a motive for Kaarle even though everything else points to him being the killer.

== Characters ==
- Inspector Palmu – Investigates the death and becomes convinced Mrs. Skrof was murdered. (Played by Joel Rinne)
- Detective Toivo Virta – Palmu's intellectual assistant detective. (Played by Matti Ranin)
- Detective Väinö Kokki – A jack-of-all-trades detective with many useful contacts. (Played by Leo Jokela)
- Kirsti Skrof – Mrs. Alma Skrof's stepdaughter whom she treated harshly after her father's death. Under the conditions of her stepmother's will Kirsti will only inherit her fortune if she marries Alma's nephew Kaarle Lankela. She was sexually harassed by Reverend Mustapää during confirmation school. (Played by Elina Salo)
- Kurt Kuurna – a wealthy painter who lives with Lankela and partakes in his drunken escapades. A descendant of Swedish nobility he relays the story of how one of his ancestors gave his horse to the Gustavus Adolphus King of Sweden during the 30 Years War and was himself killed instead. (Played by Pentti Siimes)
- Kaarle Lankela - Nephew of Alma Skrof, a race-car driver and a notorious womanizer, he becomes the prime suspect for the murder as the investigations continue. (Played by Saulo Haarla)
- Reverend P. Mustapää – A flunked theology student who formed his own Christian sect that Alma Skrof is a member of as well as a notable financial contributor. (Played by Risto Mäkelä)
- Alma Skrof – Kirsti's stepmother and a hated woman who dies after inhaling too much gas while under the influence of a sleeping drug. She is extremely wealthy and wanted to force Kirsti and Kaarle to marry one another. She belongs to the sect led by Reverend Mustapää but cuts them out of her will when she finds evidence of him sexually harassing female members of his church. (Played by Henny Valjus)
- Iiri Salmia/Irina Saljenko – A Vyborg-born Russian origin Stockholm-based Swedish national night club dancer with a husband living in Stockholm. Lankela had a relationship with her though she reveals that she rejected him on the pretence that he wasn't wealthy enough. (Played by Aino Mantsas)

== Analysis ==
In analyzing several scenes from the film, authors Kimmo Laine and Anu Juva illustrate that "comedy often emerges from aural transgressions, mobilized through spatial effects; incongruities between sound and image, musical styles, and diegetic and extradiegetic space, and temporal effects; repetition and the manipulation of duration and rhythm."

== Accolades ==
Osmo Lindeman received a Jussi Award for best music for a film.

== See also ==
- Cinema of Finland
- Lists of Finnish films
