= The Witch (1952 film) =

Noita palaa elämään
- Theatrical poster
- Directed by: Roland af Hällström
- Written by: Viljo Hela; Kaarlo Nuorvala
- Based on: Noita palaa elämään by Mika Waltari
- Produced by: Mauno Mäkelä
- Starring: Mirja Mane; Hillevi Lagerstam; Toivo Mäkelä; Sakari Jurkka; Aku Korhonen
- Cinematography: Esko Töyri
- Edited by: Tapio Ilomäki; Nils Holm
- Music by: Tapio Ilomäki
- Production company: Fennada-Filmi
- Release date: 3 October 1952
- Running time: 80 minutes
- Country: Finland
- Language: Finnish

The Witch (Finnish: Noita palaa elämään, lit. 'The witch comes back to life') is a 1952 Finnish horror film directed by Roland af Hällstrom and produced by Mauno Mäkelä. The film is based on Mika Waltari's 1947 play of the same name.

== Premise ==
The film begins with swamp digging archaeologists who find a naked girl buried in the mud hundreds of years ago as a witch. The resurrection of the girl named Birgit evokes horror, unrest, and passions on the local manor milieu; with her enchantment, the girl gets the local men in her traps and makes them a threat to each other.

== Cast ==
- Mirja Mane as Birgit Suomaa, the witch
- Toivo Mäkelä as Hannu
- Hillevi Lagerstam as Greta
- Sakari Jurkka as Veikko Hallberg
- Helge Herala as Kauko
- Aku Korhonen as Baron Hallberg
- Rakel Laakso as housekeeper
- Elna Hellman as Sauna-Maija
- Elsa Turakainen as Leena
- Elli Ylimaa as Saara
- Einari Ketola as Janne
- Jalmari Parikka as Henrik
- Mauri Jaakkola as chaplain
- Leo Jokela as hired man

== Controversy ==
The film is considered to be one of the first Finnish horror movies, along with Old Baron of Rautakylä (1923), Curses of the Witch (1927), Linnaisten vihreä kamari (1945) and The White Reindeer (1952). The nudity scenes provoked a lot of controversy at the time, and helped the film to get sold to the United States and West Germany. In Finland, 14 meters of the film was censored, including the line: "I want to hold a young warm body in my arms – in the meadow, among flowers naked, in the warmth of fire, in the warmth of blood".

== Reception ==
The Witch won two Jussi Awards, one for Esko Töyri for best cinematography and another for Lauri Elo for best production design. Young actress Mirja Mane was both praised and criticized for her performance as the witch. The reception from female critics was mostly negative, while some of the male critics noted that Mane's performance reflected an obvious talent.

== See also ==
- List of films about witchcraft
