= Ranin =

Ranin is a given name and surname. Notable people with the name include:

- Matti Ranin (1926–2013), Finnish actor
- Ranin Akua (born 1961), Nauru politician
- Ranin Salameh (born 1996), Arab-Israeli football player
- Saara Ranin (1898–1992), Finnish actress and director
