= Inspector Palmu =

Inspector Frans J. Palmu
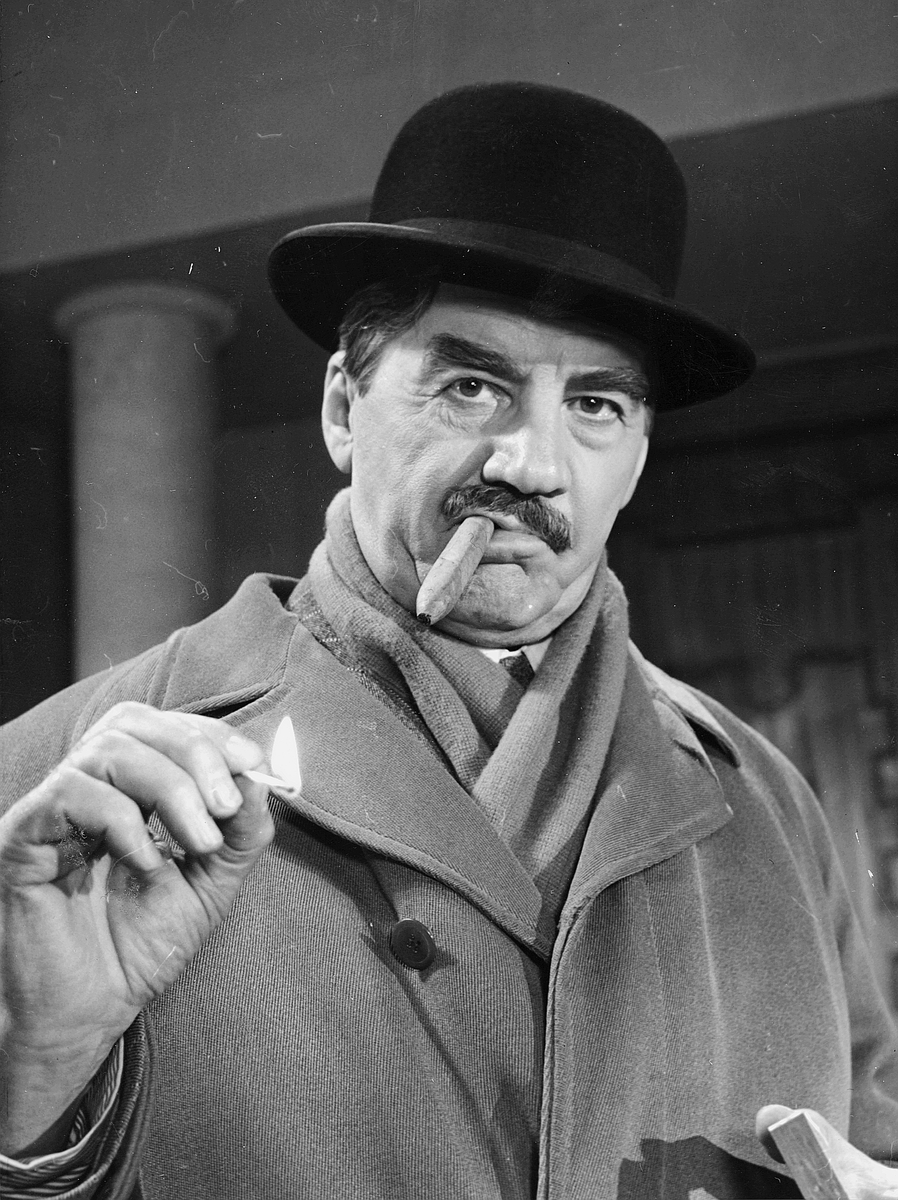
- Inspector Palmu, played by Joel Rinne
- First appearance: Kuka murhasi Rouva Skrofin? (Who Murdered Mrs. Skrof?)
- Last appearance: Tähdet kertovat, komisario Palmu (It is Written in the Stars, Inspector Palmu!)
- Created by: Mika Waltari
- Portrayed by: Joel Rinne

In-universe information
- Gender: Male
- Occupation: Police detective
- Nationality: Finnish

Inspector Frans J. Palmu (Finnish: Komisario Palmu (Note: The word "komisario" actually means commissioner.)), depicted as "a gruff detective of the Helsinki Police Department", is one of the most popular characters created by Finnish writer Mika Waltari.

The character starred in three mystery novels, all of which were filmed. His first appearance was in the 1939 novel Who Murdered Mrs. Skrof? (Kuka murhasi Rouva Skrofin?). The second book, Inspector Palmu's Mistake (Komisario Palmun erehdys), was filmed first in 1960, while the second film, Gas, Inspector Palmu! (Kaasua, Komisario Palmu), is based on the first novel. The film's Swedish title is the same as that of the original story. A fourth film was made without Waltari's involvement. The script was written by Georg Korkman and Matti Kassila, who also directed all four films. In addition The Stars Will Tell, Inspector Palmu (Tähdet kertovat, komisario Palmu) was written by Waltari knowingly so that it could be filmed.

The first movie, Inspector Palmu's Mistake, was produced by Suomen Filmiteollisuus and the latter three by Fennada. Joel Rinne plays Palmu in all four films and is accompanied by his jack-of-all-trades assistant (later restaurant owner) Väinö Kokki played by Leo Jokela and Toivo Virta the university-educated officer (who eventually outranks Palmu) played by Matti Ranin. The fourth and final film, Vodkaa, komisario Palmu, was released in 1969.

On January 19, 2021, it was announced that Renny Harlin will direct the new Inspector Palmu film. Although the film is shot in Finland, unlike the previous Finnish-language Palmu films, Harlin's film is becoming an international English-language production, where an actor is also being sought internationally for the title role. Filming of the new Inspector Palmu should begin at the end of 2024.

== Character ==
Inspector Palmu is depicted as an older officer who is only interested in facts. He also has a keen sense for when someone is lying, and is often frustrated by the bureaucracy of the police department. Though Palmu can be forward and even openly rude, he is shown being extremely sensitive around women, though he is irritated by a sexually promiscuous lady in The Stars Will Tell, Inspector Palmu. Palmu can also sometimes act more jovially, and makes jokes to irritate suspects to take action, and reveal their motives. On occasion Palmu also has a stroke of luck, such as finding a cyanide bottle in a vase when he looks into it out of sheer curiosity in Inspector Palmu's Mistake.

One of Palmu's most notorious techniques for solving crimes is baiting the murderer to reveal him/herself. For instance, he has Virta reveal that a suspect spent the night at the mansion of the deceased victim in order to smoke out the murderer whose identity he has already deduced, but he needs to catch him red-handed in order to have him arrested. This, and Palmu's bluntness, often lead to arguments between him and Virta, whom Palmu constantly keeps in the dark and talks down to. Nevertheless, Palmu shows respect for Virta's abilities. Palmu has a tendency to take credit for Virta's ideas, but he also turns to him whenever he has trouble remembering sophisticated terminology. Virta eventually rises to outrank Palmu by the time of The Stars Will Tell, Inspector Palmu. Despite their differences, Virta has a level of respect for Palmu and even takes a bullet for him in the first movie.

Palmu's age is a constant source for jokes in the films, such as his tendency to take naps in his office. Palmu is also extremely meditative, adding to the illusion that he is too old for his job, while in reality he always thinks of the most likely solution to the crime first.

Palmu's home address has never mentioned in Waltari's books, but in the 1961 film Gas, Inspector Palmu! the stairwell of Palmu's home, which was recognized by film enthusiasts as Rauhankatu 11 in Kruununhaka, Helsinki, is seen. Palmu is unmarried in the novels and the first three films, but apparently marries after his retirement from the police force, as seen in the fourth film, Vodka, Inspector Palmu.

== Style ==
Each of the Palmu films depicts police work in very meticulous detail, while containing elements of more traditional murder mystery fiction. Also, one of the recurring themes is that the victim of the murder is a person who, before own death, has a questionable reputation or this collapses fatally into obscure acts. Vodka, Inspector Palmu takes place after Palmu has retired from the police-force, and is hired by the Finnish Broadcasting Company, Yleisradio, to keep them in the loop on a politically sensitive murder. This film focuses considerably more on the media (though their role is also explored somewhat in the third film as well) and on Finland's relations with the Soviet Union.

Generally the first three films are the best received. The fourth movie is best known for its tongue-in-cheek and action movie inspired finale scene, in which the murderer is chased by the police and secret agents.

=== Canceled film ===
The fourth Inspector Palmu film was close to being realized in 1963, as Waltari's screenplay Lepäisit jo rauhassa, komisario Palmu (lit. "Just Relax Already, Inspector Palmu") was completed, but the realization of the film project failed in the 1963-1965 Finnish actor strike. In the story of the script, Inspector Palmu is investigating the murder of during the premiere of Shakespeare's Macbeth. The venue of the murder is the stage of the Old Student House in Helsinki. Hannu Salmi compares the idea to George Cukor's 1947 film noir A Double Life, where the crime takes place in the middle of Othello. The subject of the story is real estate fraud. Matti Kassila, who directed the previous films, also found it difficult to adapt the script into a film, because he thought it contained a lot of dialogue and few events. Among other things, the manuscript copy is in the possession of Panu Rajala, the author of the Waltari's biography, who considers it a success.

== Actor notes ==
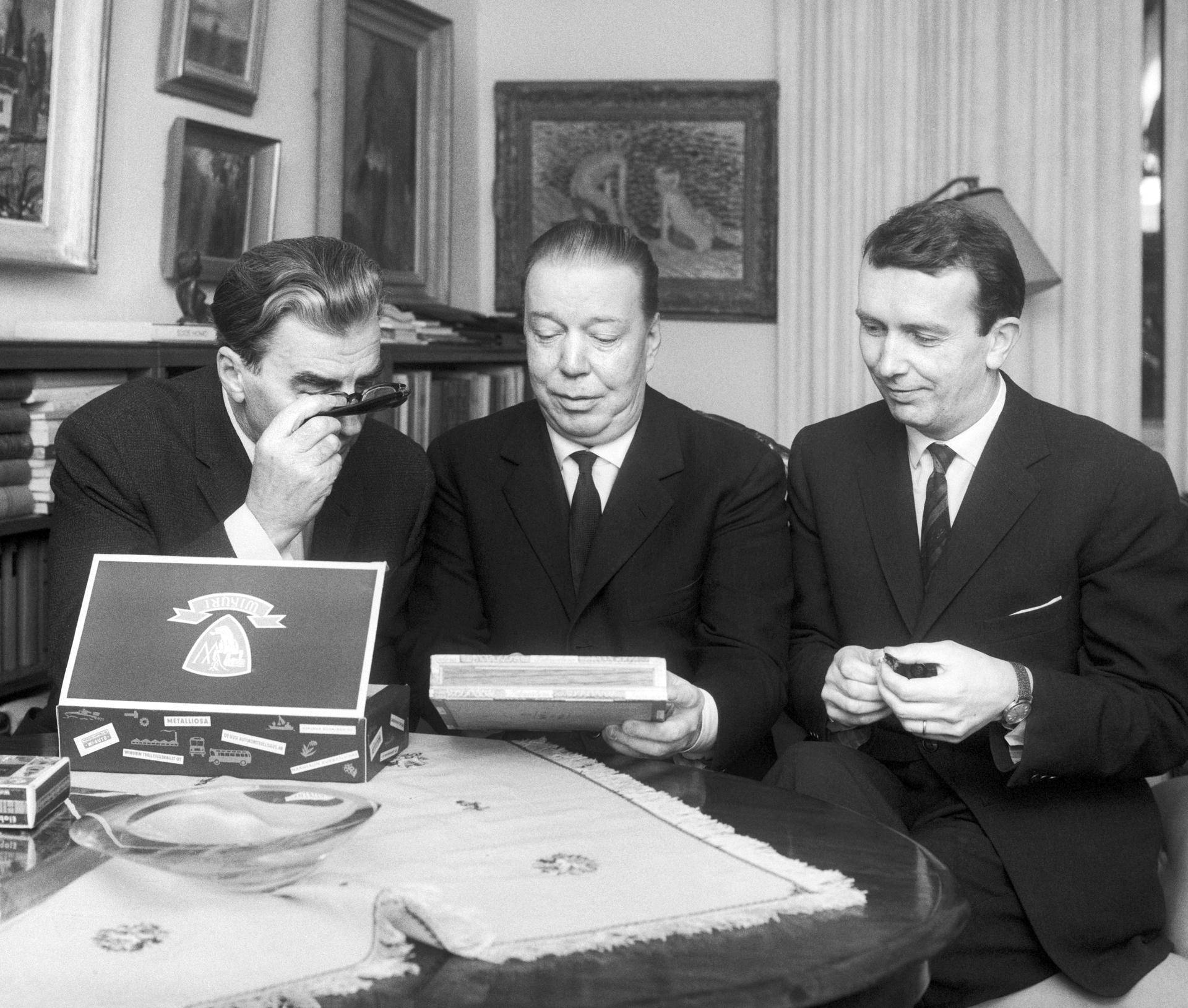
From left to right: actor Joel Rinne, writer Mika Waltari, and filmmaker Matti Kassila in 1962.

- Pentti Siimes plays a completely different role in each of the first three Palmu movies: the university student Aimo Rykämö in the first film, artist Kurt Kuurna in the second and journalist Nopsanen in the third.
- Aino Mantsas plays three different roles in the first three films: Alli Rygseck the second victim in the first film, Iiri Salmia the Russian club singer and Annika Vadenblick in the third.
- Esko Salminen played cadet Leppä in the second film and a more prominent role, the greaser Ville Valkonen, in the third film. He also had an uncredited bit role in the first film as one of the guests in Bruno Rygseck's pool party.
- Elina Salo, who portrayed Airi Rykämö in the first movie and also played Kirsti Skrof in the second.
- Risto Mäkelä, who portrayed Police chief Hagert in the first movie also played Reverend P. Mustapää in the second.
- Toivo Mäkelä who appears in a bit role as the pianist in the first movie, returned in a more prominent role as judge Lanne in the second.

== Novels featuring Inspector Palmu ==
- Who Murdered Mrs. Skrof? (Kuka murhasi Rouva Skrofin?, 1939)
- Inspector Palmu's Mistake (Komisario Palmun erehdys, 1940)
- It is Written in the Stars, Inspector Palmu! (Tähdet kertovat, komisario Palmu, 1962)

== Films featuring Inspector Palmu ==
- Inspector Palmu's Mistake (1960)
- Gas, Inspector Palmu! (1961)
- The Stars Will Tell, Inspector Palmu (1962)
- Vodka, Inspector Palmu (1969)

== See also ==
- Nordic noir

== Sources ==
=== Literature ===
- Juha Järvelä & Marjo Vallittu: Komisario Palmun jäljillä. Helsinki: Avain, 2014. ISBN 978-952-304-040-3.
