= Saara Ranin =

Finnish actress and director

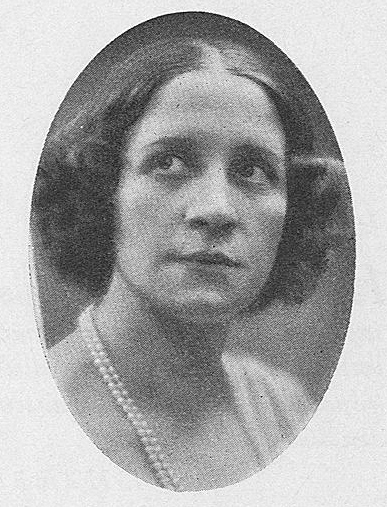
Ranin in the early 1930s

Saara Vilhelmiina Ranin (originally Muinonen; 3 March 1898 in Hamina – 3 March 1992) was a Finnish actress and director. She made a long career in various Finnish theatres while also appearing in several films. Saara Ranin was married to Helge Ranin, and actor Matti Ranin was their son.

As a film actress, Ranin is best remembered as Amalia Rygseck in the Matti Kassila film Komisario Palmun erehdys (1960). Her final film appearance also came in a Kassila film, Natalia (1979). Saara Ranin died in 1992 on her 94th birthday after a short illness.

== Selected filmography ==
- Ei auta itku markkinoilla (1927)
- Sinut minä tahdon (1949)
- Hilman päivät (1954)
- Pastori Jussilainen (1955)
- Island Girl (1953)
- Minä ja mieheni morsian (1955)
- Virtaset ja Lahtiset (1959)
- Komisario Palmun erehdys (1960)
- Pikku Pietarin piha (1961)
