= Inspector Palmu's Mistake (novel) =

Novel by Mika Waltari

- Cover of the first Finnish edition
- Author: Mika Waltari
- Original title: Finnish: Komisario Palmun erehdys
- Language: Finnish
- Genre: crime
- Publisher: WSOY
- Publication date: 1940
- Publication place: Finland
- Media type: Print (Hardback)
- Pages: 272
- OCLC: 1100001264
- Preceded by: Who Murdered Mrs Skrof?
- Followed by: It is Written in the Stars, Inspector Palmu!

Inspector Palmu's Mistake (Finnish: Komisario Palmun erehdys) is a 1940 Finnish detective novel by Mika Waltari. It is the second book of the Inspector Palmu series after the first book, Who Murdered Mrs Skrof?. The protagonist of the book, like his predecessor, is Inspector Frans J. Palmu, who sets out to investigate a rich victim who appears to have died in an accident, but who is revealed to have been murdered.

On the basis of the book, a film adaptation by the same name was made in 1960, directed by Matti Kassila, in which Palmu is played by Joel Rinne. It has enjoyed great popularity over the years, and in 2012, it was voted the best Finnish film of all time by Finnish film critics, journalists and bloggers in a poll organized by Yle Uutiset.

Directed by Mika Waltari's grandson Joel Elstelä, the first theatrical adaptation of the book was in the Helsinki City Theatre's repertoire from August to December 2016. Inspector Palmu was performed by Mikko Kivinen. At the end of 2017, a new arrangement with Palmu starring Ismo Sievinen premiered at the Mikkeli Theatre. The director is still Elstelä. Kivinen's performance of Palmu received mixed opinions from reviewers, but Sievinen has been considered a successful choice.
