= Leo Jokela =

Finnish actor (1927–1975)

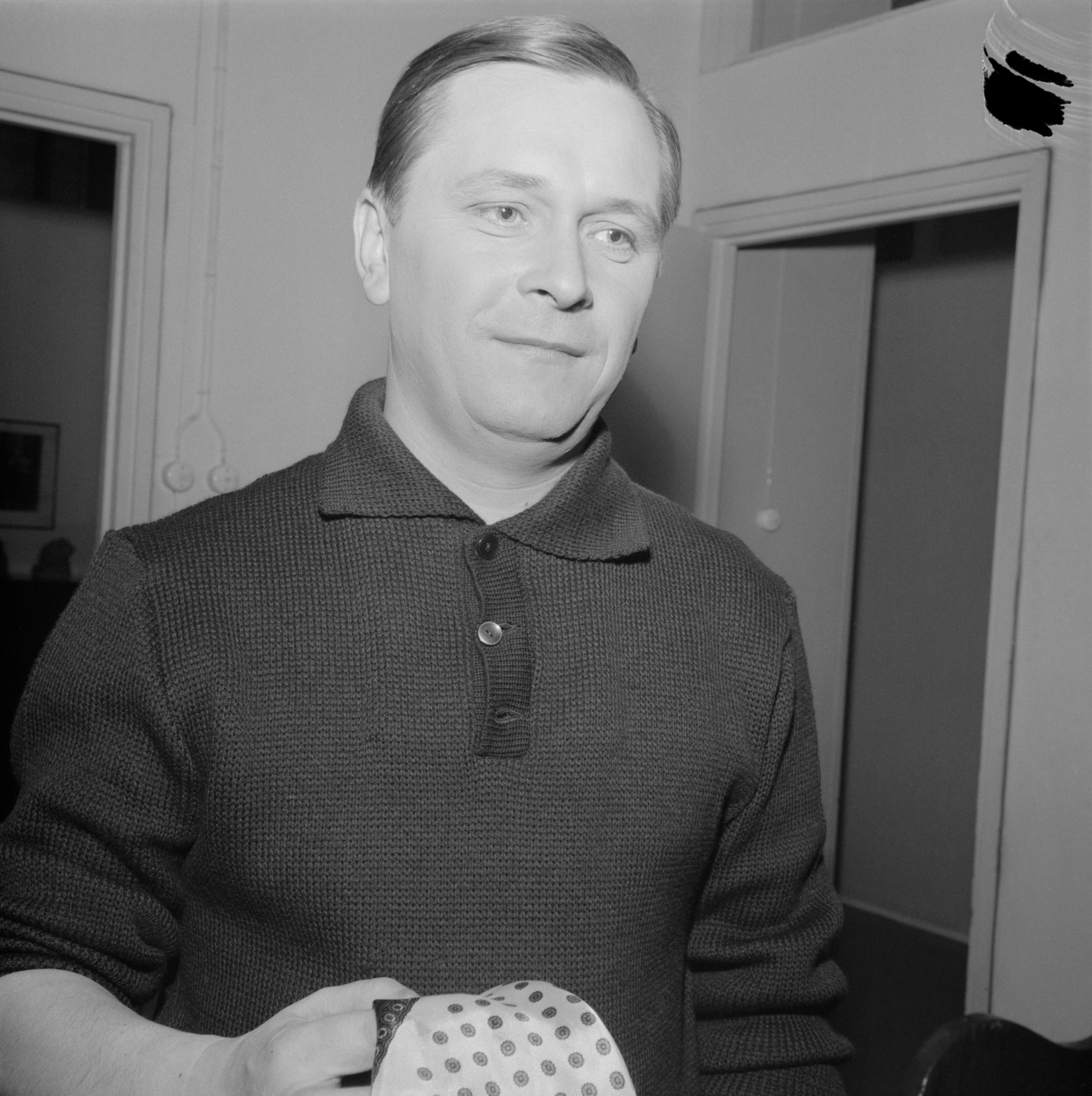
Jokela in 1961

Leo Paavali Jokela (24 January 1927 – 11 May 1975) was a Finnish actor. He is best remembered for his role as a detective Kokki in Matti Kassila's Komisario Palmu films and as a parrot G. Pula-aho in Spede Pasanen's radio programs.

== Career beginnings ==
Jokela worked in several Finnish theatres before making his impact on films. His first major film role came in a 1954 crime comedy Kovanaama, directed by Aarne Tarkas. During the next ten years, Jokela appeared in almost all Tarkas films, in bigger or smaller parts. Besides acting, he also worked occasionally as a make-up artist.

== Highlights ==
In 1960, Jokela appeared as a detective Kokki in Matti Kassila film Komisario Palmun erehdys. A scene in which he sings a song Silmät tummat kuin yö has since become his signature moment in film. Jokela subsequently reprised this role in three more Komisario Palmu films; Kaasua, komisario Palmu! (1961), Tähdet kertovat, komisario Palmu (1962) and Vodkaa, komisario Palmu (1969). For his role in Tähdet kertovat, komisario Palmu, he received a Jussi Award for best supportive actor.

== Private life ==
Leo Jokela was married twice, first to Eila Sillantie (1947–1952) and then to Marja-Terttu Vainio, from 1957 until his death in 1975. Jokela was known as a heavy drinker, and the cause of his death at the age of 48 was cirrhosis of the liver. One of his dearest hobbies was knitting.

== Legacy ==
Leo Jokela Boozing Society celebrates Jokela's life work by honoring G. Pula-aho statues and certificates every year to Finnish entertainment professionals for outstanding achievements in culture and entertainment. A biography Leo Jokela – vaatimaton sivuosien sankari (Modest star of supporting roles) was released in 2017.

== Selected filmography ==
- Serenaadiluutnantti (1949)
- Kanavan laidalla (1949)
- Tukkijoella (1951)
- Lakeuksien lukko (1952)
- Noita palaa elämään (1952)
- Kuningas kulkureitten (1953)
- Alaston malli karkuteillä (1953)
- Sininen viikko (1954)
- Putkinotko (1954)
- Hilman päivät (1954)
- Villi Pohjola (1955)
- Elokuu (1956)
- Punainen viiva (1959)
- Ei ruumiita makuuhuoneeseen (1959)
- Komisario Palmun erehdys (1960)
- Kultainen vasikka (1961)
- Kaasua, komisario Palmu! (1961)
- Tähdet kertovat, komisario Palmu (1962)
- Taape tähtenä (1962)
- Johan nyt on markkinat! (1966)
- Pähkähullu Suomi (1967)
- Vain neljä kertaa (1968)
- Noin 7 veljestä (1968)
- Vodkaa, komisario Palmu (1969)
- Näköradiomiehen ihmeelliset siekailut (1969)
- Rautatie (1973)
- Viu-hah hah-taja (1974)
