= Vodkaa, komisario Palmu =

- Directed by: Matti Kassila
- Written by: Matti Kassila (writer); Georg Korkman
- Produced by: Mauno Mäkelä; Suomen Filmiteollisuus
- Starring: Joel Rinne; Matti Ranin; Leo Jokela; Viktor Klimenko
- Cinematography: Esko Nevalainen
- Edited by: Juho Gartz
- Music by: Rauno Lehtinen
- Production company: Fennada-Filmi
- Release date: 12 September 1969
- Running time: 100 min
- Country: Finland
- Language: Finnish

Vodkaa, komisario Palmu (Vodka, Inspector Palmu) is a 1969 film directed by Matti Kassila. It is the fourth and final part of the Inspector Palmu series and the only part of the series to be filmed in color. The film is also the only one not to be based on a novel by Mika Waltari.

The film sees a now-retired and married Palmu helping the Finnish Broadcasting company discover the truth behind the murder of one of their reporters.

== Plot ==
An important agreement on a tunnel building project is being held between Finland and Soviet Union in secrecy, over fears of their political effects. When the press catches wind that the meeting is held at the foreign minister's manor, the talks are hastily moved. A reporter for the Finnish Broadcasting Company, is murdered on the grounds of the manor and his camera-man is caught by the guards.

The police and Finnish Broadcasting Company can't come to agreement over how to handle the investigation, as the police want to keep the details of the talks a secret. Finnish Broadcasting Company then turns to the retired Palmu to help the company discover the truth behind the murder. This greatly upsets Inspector Virta, who asks Palmu to stay away from the case. Eventually, Palmu realises that the murder was politically motivated and that a far-right underground group was looking to silence the reporter and sabotage the talks between Finland and the Soviet Union.

== Production ==
Matti Kassila and Mika Waltari originally planned to follow Tähdet kertovat, komisario Palmu with a TV-series based on the character called Lepää Rauhassa, Komisario Palmu (Rest in Peace, Inspector Palmu). However, a country-wide writers' strike put the plans on hold.

After a few years, Kassila decided to make another Palmu movie and set it in contemporary era (previous Palmu films and novels were set in pre-War Finland and the 1950s). Waltari had no direct involvement with the film. Kassila has later admitted that the film failed to live up to the prior movies, despite featuring elements of satire involving Finnish politics and Finnish Broadcasting Company.

== See also ==
- Farewell, Mr. President
