= Kassila =

Kassila may refer to:

- Matti Kassila (1924–2018), Finnish director
- Kassila, Senegal, a village in Senegal
