= Leevi Kuuranne =

Finnish actor

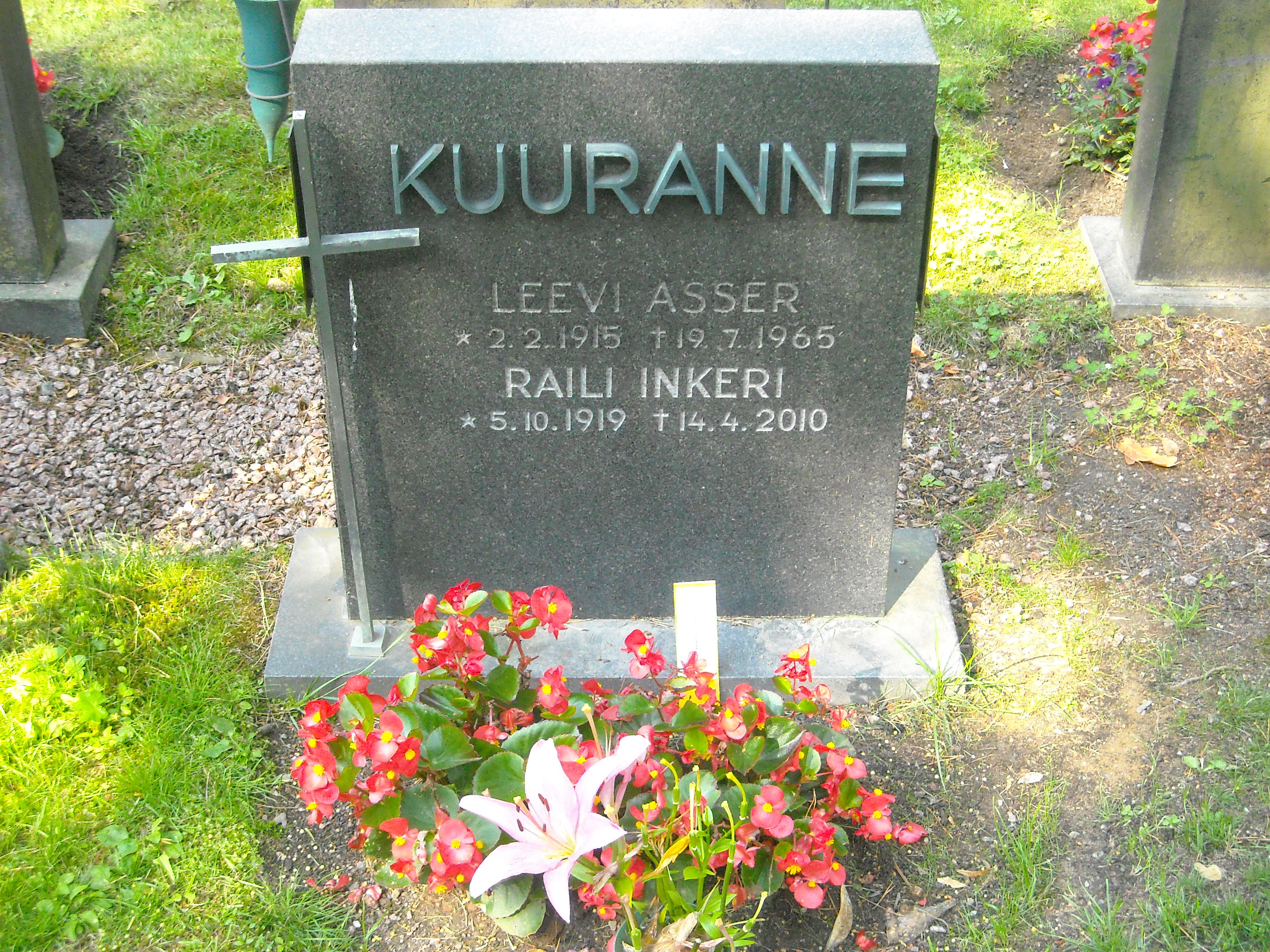
The gravestone of Kuuranne in Honkanummi cemetery

Leevi Asser Kuuranne (previously Lindström; 2 February 1915 in Tampere – 19 July 1965) was a Finnish actor. He is best remembered for his role as a butler Veijonen in a Matti Kassila film Komisario Palmun erehdys (1960). Kuuranne worked in several Finnish theatres and appeared in nine films during his career. He was married to Raili Kuuranne (previously Pohjanheimo, originally Valkola) (1919–2010).

== Filmography ==
- Oi, muistatkos... (1954)
- Ratkaisun päivät (1956)
- Sven Tuuva (1958)
- Komisario Palmun erehdys (1960)
- Pikku Pietarin piha (1961)
- Miljoonavaillinki (1961)
- Varjostettua valoa (1962)
- Tie pimeään (1962)
- Villin Pohjolan salattu laakso (1963)
