= Little Presents =

1961 film

- Directed by: Jack Witikka
- Written by: Aapeli
- Produced by: Risto Orko
- Starring: Aapeli
- Cinematography: Yrjö Aaltonen
- Edited by: Armas Laurinen
- Production company: Suomi-Filmi
- Release date: 1 December 1961
- Running time: 73 minutes
- Country: Finland
- Language: Finnish

Little Presents (Finnish: Pikku Pietarin piha) is a 1961 Finnish drama film directed by Jack Witikka. It was entered into the 12th Berlin International Film Festival.

== Cast ==
- Leif Aaltonen
- Aapeli - God (voice) (as Simo Puupponen)
- Kaarlo Halttunen - Clocksmith
- Eija Hämäläinen
- Pia Hattara - Vetterantin Torotea
- Hannes Häyrinen - Manager Palkeinen
- Raili Helander - Liisi
- Pentti Irjala - Caretaker Harakka
- Tea Ista - Vetterantin Klory
- Leo Jokela - Vennu Harakka
- Leevi Kuuranne - Jormalainen
- Irja Kuusla - Tattari's wife
- Heimo Lepistö - Tattari
- Eila Pehkonen - Hilma
- Pekka Pentti - Henry
- Nisse Rainne - Caretaker Kuikka
- Saara Ranin - Vetteranska
- Jouko Rikalainen - Osku
- Leo Riuttu - Friman
- Heikki Savolainen - Photographer Toivakka
- Irma Seikkula - Clocksmith's wife
- Eero Siljamäki - Immu
- Olavi Suhonen
- Tuukka Tanner - Pietari Jormalainen
- Elsa Turakainen - Karoliina
- Henny Valjus - Clocksmith's mother-in-law (as Henny Waljus)
- Reino Valkama - Cloth merchant
