= Hillevi Lagerstam =

Finnish actress (1923–1998)

Mary Hillevi Lagerstam (since 1958 Mannermaa; 9 August 1923 – 21 October 1998) was a Finnish actress.

== Biography ==
Lagerstam worked for Helsinki City Theatre for over 40 years and appeared in 37 films.

Lagerstam married actor Esko Mannermaa in 1958 and was widowed in 1975. They appear together in the 1955 film Nukkekauppias ja kaunis Lilith.

== Awards ==
She received a Jussi Award for Best Actress in a Leading Role in 1970, for the film Takiaispallo.

== Selected filmography ==
- Houkutuslintu (1946)
- Sinut minä tahdon (1949)
- Noita palaa elämään (1952)
- Isän vanha ja uusi (1955)
- Minkkiturkki (1961)
- Nuoruus vauhdissa (1961)
- Takiaispallo (1970)
- Lain ulkopuolella (1987)
