= Rakel Laakso =

Finnish actress

- Born: 2 April 1904; Helsinki, Grand Duchy of Finland
- Died: 9 March 1985 (aged 80)
- Occupation: Actress
- Years active: 1943-1970 (film & TV)

Rakel Laakso (1904–1985) was a Finnish film actress. She was married to the actor Uuno Laakso.

== Selected filmography ==
- A Night in Rio (1951)
- Shamrock (1953)
- Red Line (1959)

== Bibliography ==
- Tad Bentley Hammer. International film prizes: an encyclopedia. Garland, 1991.
