= Robert Balser =

American animator and animation director (1927–2016)

Robert Edward Balser (March 25, 1927 – January 4, 2016) was an American animator and animation director. Balser, together with co-director Jack Stokes, are best known as the animation directors for the 1968 film, Yellow Submarine, which was inspired by the music of the Beatles. He also directed the animated "Den" sequence of the 1981 film, Heavy Metal.

== Early life ==
Balser was born on March 25, 1927, in Rochester, New York. He moved to Los Angeles with his parents, where he attended high school and enrolled in classes at the Chouinard Art Institute. He served in the United States Navy's Office of Strategic Services (O.S.S.) Office of Research and Inventions in New York City from 1945 to 1946 during the eve of World War II.

Following the war, Balser, using the G.I. Bill, studied at the University of California, Los Angeles (UCLA), where he majored in advertising art and earned a Bachelor of Arts in 1950. During his senior year at UCLA, Balser signed up for his final required course, an animation class taught by Bill Shull, an animator for the Walt Disney Company, which sparked his interest in a career in animation. He decided to take additional animation classes and created three films as part of his course work: Old King Cole, Richard Corey, and I Like to See It Lap the Miles. His three films were later released by the theater arts department of the UCLA School of Theater, Film and Television.

== Career ==
Balser's career spanned more than five decades. He began as a freelance animator, working on television commercials and documentaries. He worked as a layout artist for Norman Wright Productions during the 1950s. Balser also worked under Saul Bass, a graphic designer, to help create Bass' seven minute animated title sequence for the film, Around the World in 80 Days, released in 1956.

In 1959, Balser and his wife left Los Angeles for a six-month work sabbatical. They purchased two one-way tickets for the SS Maasdam ocean liner from New York City to Le Havre, France. While in Europe, the Balsers obtained press passes to the Cannes, Moscow, and the Venice Film Festivals, where they wrote film reviews for Film Quarterly, a UCLA film journal. The couple ran out of income after five months, but Balser was offered a job with Laterna Films in Copenhagen, Denmark. He relocated to Finland one year later, where he founded the animation department at the now-defunct Fennada-Filmi. Several of Balser's films at Fennada-Filmi won awards. He traveled to West Germany and Italy before returning to Copenhagen.

In 1964, Balser directed El Sombrero, an animated short film written by Alan Shean, for Estudios Moro, a Spanish production company.

He is perhaps best known for his work on the 1968 British animated film, Yellow Submarine, which was Balser's first feature film. Balser, who was one of the only American animators to be hired for the film, served as the animation director of Yellow Submarine with Jack Stokes. Balser and Stokes oversaw a staff of more than 100 artists and animators, who hand-drew the film's animation over the course of eleven months. They also co-directed and created the storyboards for the animated sequences of the film. The total budget for the Yellow Submarine was less than one million dollars.

Following the success of Yellow Submarine, Balser founded a production company, Pegbar Productions, headquartered in Barcelona, Spain, where he produced animated television shows and films. Balser produced ABC's The Jackson 5ive, a Saturday morning cartoon which aired for one season from 1971 to 1972; the 1979 animated television movie The Lion, the Witch and the Wardrobe, the BBC's children's series Barney, as well as several episodes of The Charlie Brown and Snoopy Show, which aired on CBS during the mid-1980s. He also directed more than 175 television commercials and documentaries, which were aired throughout Europe, as well as countries as far away from Barcelona as Iran.

Balser served on the board of directors for the International Animated Film Association (ASIFA) from 1978 to 1994, and helped to establish ASIFA-Spain in 1980. In 1986, Balser and his wife, Cima, joined with four other couples to establish the Benjamin Franklin International School in Barcelona. Their school now has more than 500 students, as of 2016.

In 1993, Balser closed Pegbar Productions, his production company in Barcelona. He then directed The Triplets, a Catalan animated series for Cromosoma Productions. Balser left Spain in 1996. Next, Balser lived in Cairo, Egypt, for several months, where he worked as an animation consultant for the International Executive Service Corporation. He then moved to Ankara, Turkey, for two years, where he directed television series that aired in Germany and the United States.

== Personal life ==
Balser met his wife, Cima, while attending UCLA. Bob and Cima Balser married on June 25, 1950, just one week after graduating from UCLA.

In 1999, Robert and Balser retired to Marina del Rey, California, a coastal suburb of Los Angeles. He became a consultant and lecturer. Balser also served on the "Short films and Animation Feature Branch" of the Academy of Motion Picture Arts and Sciences and remained an active member of the British Academy of Film and Television Arts (BAFTA).

== Death ==
Balser was hospitalized for respiratory failure during mid-December 2015. He died from complications of respiratory failure at Cedars-Sinai Medical Center in Los Angeles, California, on January 4, 2016, at the age of 88. Balser was survived by his wife of 65 years, Cima Balser, and their son, Trevel. His memorial service was held at the Marina City Club in Marina del Rey, California, on January 16, 2016.

== Archives ==
The moving image collection of Bob Balser is held at the Academy Film Archive.
