= Arvo Lehesmaa =

Finnish actor

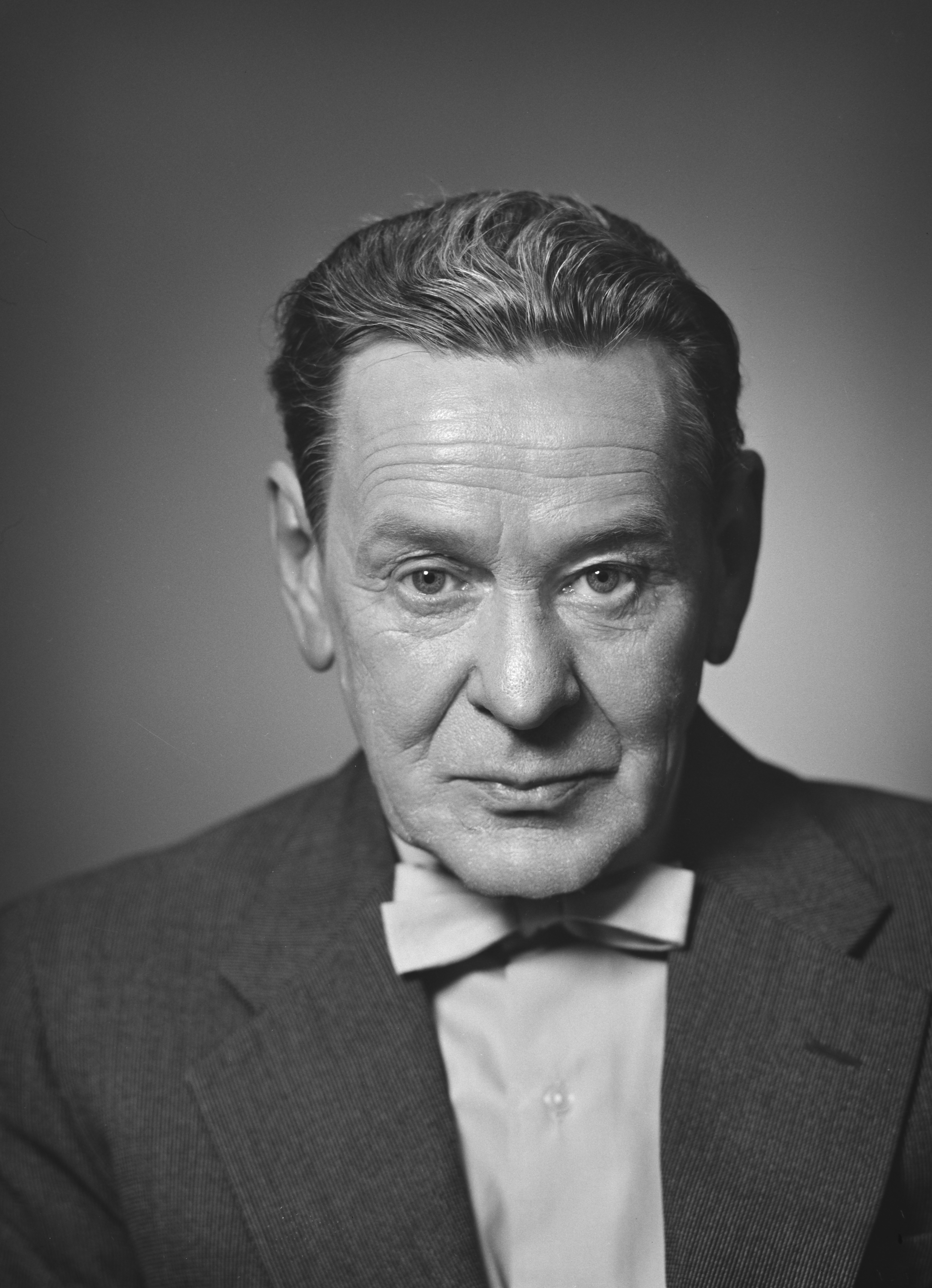
Arvo Lehesmaa in 1961.

Arvo Aleksander Lehesmaa (till 1928 Nylund; 22 October 1901 – 18 May 1973) was a Finnish actor. He was seen on stage in such roles as Esko in an Aleksis Kivi play Nummisuutarit and Jago in William Shakespeare's Othello. He also appeared in 93 films during his career.

== Selected filmography ==
- Lapseni on minun (1940)
- Ryhmy ja Romppainen (1941)
- The Dead Man Loses His Temper (1944)
- Linnaisten vihreä kamari (1945)
- ”Minä elän” (1946)
- Suopursu kukkii (1947)
- Särkelä itte (1947)
- Ruusu ja kulkuri (1948)
- Laitakaupungin laulu (1948)
- Prinsessa Ruusunen (1949)
- Serenaadiluutnantti (1949)
- Ruma Elsa (1949)
- Radio tekee murron (1951)
- Four Times Love (1951)
- Valkoinen peura (1952)
- Radio tulee hulluksi (1952)
- Pekka Puupää (1953)
- The Girl from Moon Bridge (1953)
- Hilman päivät (1954)
- Ryysyrannan Jooseppi (1955)
- Risti ja liekki (1957)
- Mies tältä tähdeltä (1958)
- Komisario Palmun erehdys (1960)
- Täällä Pohjantähden alla (1968)
- Pohjantähti (1973)
