= List of Finnish films =

A list of films produced in Finland ordered by year of release. For an alphabetical list of Finnish films see Category:Finnish films

- List of Finnish films before 1917
- List of Finnish films of 1917–39
- List of Finnish films of the 1940s
- List of Finnish films of the 1950s
- List of Finnish films of the 1960s
- List of Finnish films of the 1970s
- List of Finnish films of the 1980s
- List of Finnish films of the 1990s
- List of Finnish films of the 2000s
- List of Finnish films of the 2010s
- List of Finnish films of the 2020s
