= Toivo Mäkelä =

Finnish actor (1909–1979)

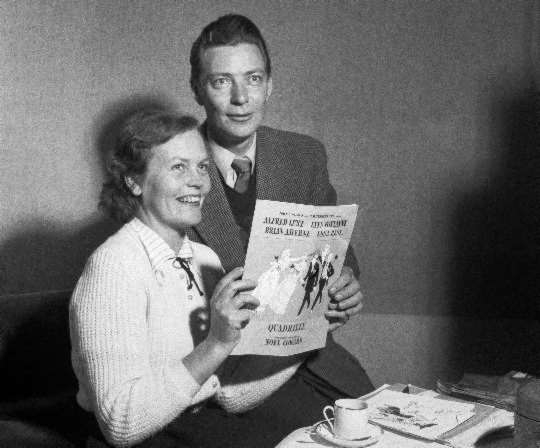
- Mäkelä with Irma Seikkula in 1954
- Born: 26 September 1909; Loviisa, Finland
- Died: 20 April 1979 (aged 69); Helsinki, Finland
- Occupation: Actor
- Years active: 1951–1979

Toivo Mäkelä (26 September 1909 – 20 April 1979) was a Finnish film actor, appearing in more than 50 films between 1951 and 1979. He won a Jussi Award for Best Actor in 1978 and was awarded a Pro Finlandia medal in 1960.

== Partial filmography ==
- Pitkäjärveläiset (1951) - Mikko
- Noita palaa elämään (1952) - Hannu
- Kolmiapila (1953) - Drunken man
- Kovanaama (1954) - Anders - The Boss
- Sininen viikko (1954) -Bertel Forss
- Olemme kaikki syyllisiä (1954) - Doctor Heiskanen
- Nukkekauppias ja kaunis Lilith (1955) - Hovimestari (uncredited)
- Villi Pohjola (1955) - Valokuvaaja
- Viettelysten tie (1955) - Social worker
- The Harvest Month (1956) - Viktor Sundvall
- Pää pystyyn Helena (1957) - Eero Alanen
- Kuriton sukupolvi (1957) - Toimittaja Arvo Kääri
- Syntipukki (1957) - Lasse Aro
- Asessorin naishuolet (1958) - Tuomari Pakkola
- Verta käsissämme (1958) - Hovimestari
- Red Line (1959) - Jussi Kettuvaara
- Lasisydän (1959) - Psychiatrist / tramp
- Pekka ja Pätkä neekereinä (1960) - Dr. Pujoparta
- Justus järjestää kaiken (1960) - Manager
- Kaks' tavallista Lahtista (1960) - Managing clerk Puntti
- Kankkulan kaivolla (1960) - Nestori
- Komisario Palmun erehdys (1960) - Pianisti
- Autotytöt (1960) - Sailor
- Opettajatar seikkailee (1960) - Master Petäjä
- Minkkiturkki (1961) - Vilho, Head of "Valtakunnan rakennustoimisto"
- The Scarlet Dove (1961) - Maalaismies (uncredited)
- Olin nahjuksen vaimo (1961) - Judge Simolin
- Kaasua, komisario Palmu! (1961) - Lanne
- Kultainen vasikka (1961) - Herman Ahlroos
- Kuu on vaarallinen (1961) - Sten Lehtoja
- Hän varasti elämän (1962) - Kirkkoherra Evald Kettunen
- Naiset, jotka minulle annoit (1962) - Leo Luotola
- Vaarallista vapautta (1962) - Rainer
- Villin Pohjolan kulta (1963) - Pappi (uncredited)
- Turkasen tenava! (1963) - Ediatrician
- Pähkähullu Suomi (1967) - Prime minister
- Oppenheimerin tapaus (1967) - Ward V. Evans
- Äl' yli päästä perhanaa (1968) - Arvi Jalmari Mattila / Iisalmen pastori / valtiopäivämies / Hannu Karppinen
- Aika hyvä ihmiseksi (1977) - Valokuvaaja Hurme
- Runoilija ja muusa (1978) - Old waiter
