= Esko Nevalainen =

Finnish cinematographer

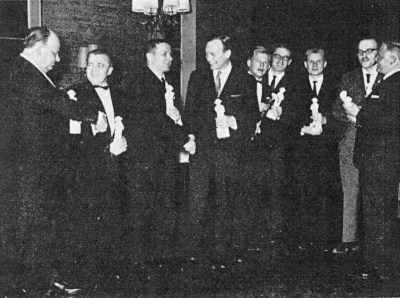
Jussi Award winners in 1964. From left: Kaarlo Nuorvala, Esko Nevalainen, Mikko Niskanen, Matti Oravisto, Erkko Kivikoski, Virke Lehtinen, Juho Gartz, Kari Rydman and Niilo Heino.

Esko Nevalainen (10 May 1925 – 23 July 2008) was a Finnish film cinematographer. His career started in 1945 when he began to work as an assistant for a production company called Filmitaito.

Nevalainen got his first major job as a cinematographer in a Matti Kassila film Elokuu (1956). For this film, he also received his first of four a Jussi Award for best cinematography. Nevalainen and Kassila collaborated several times over the years, in such movies as Punainen viiva (1959), Kaasua, komisario Palmu! (1961) and Natalia (1979).

== Selected filmography ==
- Villi Pohjola (1955)
- Jokin ihmisessä (1956)
- Lasisydän (1959)
- Naiset, jotka minulle annoit (1962)
- Sissit (1963)
- Käpy selän alla (1966)
- Kuuma kissa? (1968)
- Asfalttilampaat (1968)
- Päämaja (1970)
- Kuningas, jolla ei ollut sydäntä (1982)
- Kun Hunttalan Matti Suomen osti (1984)
