= Osmo Lindeman =

Finnish composer

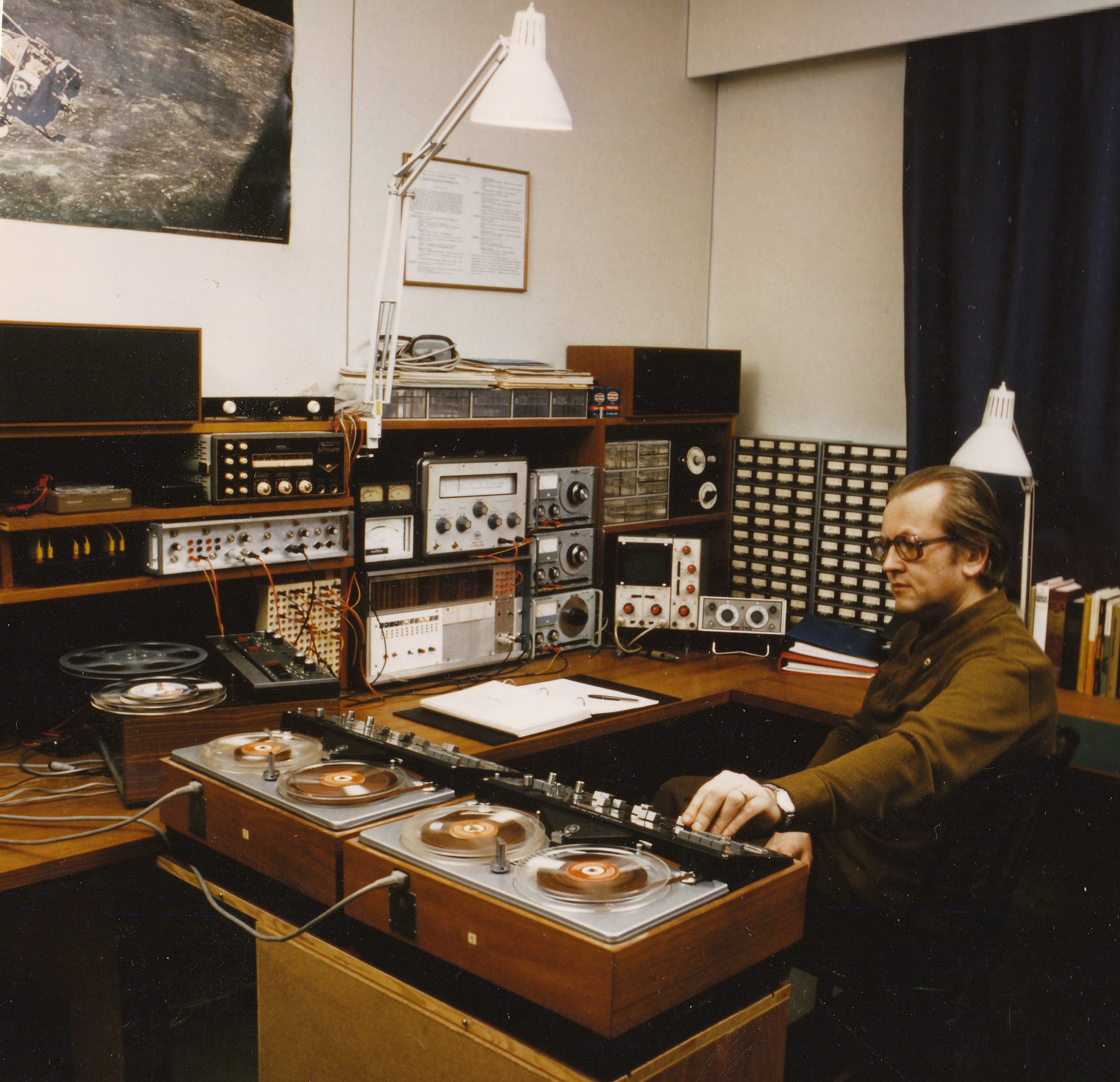
Lindeman in his home studio in 1972

Osmo Uolevi Lindeman (16 May 1929 – 15 February 1987) was a Finnish composer and music pedagogue.

Lindeman worked as a jazz and dance musician, with piano being his instrument. He became known as a pioneer of Finnish electronic music. Lindeman also composed music for several films, such as Matti Kassila's Punainen viiva (1961) for which he received a Jussi Award. Another Kassila film, Kaasua, komisario Palmu!, brought him his second Jussi Award in 1961.

== Selected filmography ==
- Punainen viiva (1959)
- Komisario Palmun erehdys (1960)
- Tulipunainen kyyhkynen (1961)
- Rakas... (1961)
- Kultainen vasikka (1961)
- Kaasua, komisario Palmu! (1961)
- Tähdet kertovat, komisario Palmu (1962)
- Totuus on armoton (1963)
