= Joel Rinne =

Finnish actor

Toivo Joel Rinne
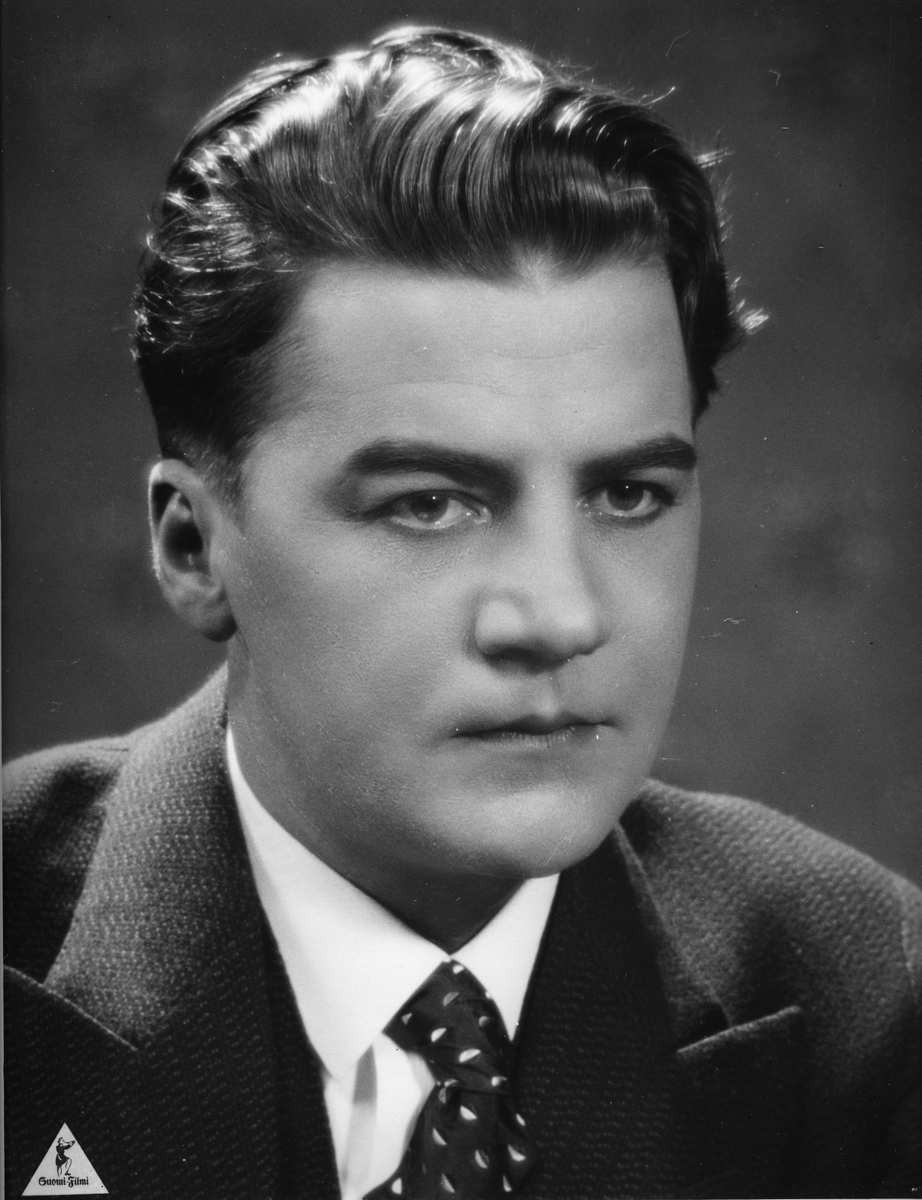
- Joel Rinne
- Born: 6 June 1897; Asikkala, Grand Duchy of Finland
- Died: 3 December 1981 (aged 84); Helsinki, Finland

Toivo Joel Rinne (6 June 1897, Asikkala – 3 December 1981) was a prolific Finnish actor of stage and screen. Among his most memorable film parts is the title role in the Inspector Palmu movie series, which started in 1960s Komisario Palmun erehdys, and continued in three sequels. Another well-known role by Rinne is in the 1970 film Päämaja, directed by Matti Kassila, in which Rinne interprets in the role of Marshal Mannerheim.

== Career ==
Joel Rinne also appeared on the radio. In the 1960s Finnish-language audio drama version of Gestatten, mein Name ist Cox ("Good Evening, My Name Is Cox"), he played the title character, the adventurer Paul Cox. In the Paul Temple audio drama series, he was also in the title role.

Joel Rinne was married twice. His first wife was actor Rosi Helminen (1896–1964) and his second Saga Rikberg (1908–1983). Rinne were three daughters: Saara Liisa, Kirsti and Lena, of whom Kirsti died as a child. The marriage with Helminen in 1924 ended in divorce in 1934, but the alliance with Rikberg lasted from 1936 until Rinne's death.

== Filmography ==
- Se parhaiten nauraa, joka viimeksi nauraa (1921), Drunk
- Kiljusen pojat koulussa (1921)
- Koskenlaskijan morsian (1923), Lumberjack
- Rautakylän vanha parooni (1923), Reverend Richard von Dahlen
- Murtovarkaus (1926)
- Nuori luotsi (1928)
- Miekan terällä (1928)
- Aatamin puvussa ja vähän Eevankin (1931), Aarne Himanen
- Rovastin häämätkat (1931), Viljo
- Olenko minä tullut haaremiin! (1932), Arvi Halmenheimo
- Minä ja ministeri (1934), Raimo Vehari
- Meidän poikamme ilmassa - me maassa (1934), Jarmo Kurki
- VMV 6 (1936), Olavi Manner
- Ja alla oli tulinen järvi (1937), Jussi Raala
- Kuin uni ja varjo (1937), Juho
- Tulitikkuja lainaamassa (1938), Ville Kettunen
- Olenko minä tullut haaremiin (1938), Arvi Halmenheimo
- Syyllisiäkö? (1938), Aarre Einola
- Nummisuutarit (1938), Mikko Vilkastus
- Halveksittu (1939), Thure Gavelius
- Seitsemän veljestä (1939), Timo
- Suotorpan tyttö (1940), Pekka Martikainen
- SF-paraati (1940), Jopi Rintee
- Perheen musta lammas (1941), Erkki Rautia
- Jos oisi valtaa (1941), Gunnar Berg
- Suomisen perhe (1941), Sam Nelson
- Poikamies-pappa (1941), Jopi
- Täysosuma (1941), Erkki Kaipio
- The Dead Man Falls in Love (1942), Colonel Rainer Sarmo
- Yli rajan (1942), Mikko Vanhala
- Syntynyt terve tyttö (1943), Kustaa Helasuo
- Miehen kunnia (1943), Kaarlo Auer
- Kirkastettu sydän (1943), Ahti Helpi
- The Dead Man Loses His Temper (1944), Colonel Rainer Sarmo
- Kartanon naiset (1944), Jukka Kaplas
- Kolmastoista koputus (1945), Pentti Kalho
- Valkoisen neilikan velho (1945), Lauri Liesi
- Hedelmätön puu (1947), Taunu Sysikorpi
- Pikku-Matti maailmalla (1947), Taneli Parma
- Kilroy sen teki (1948), Yrjö Haara
- Hormoonit valloillaan (1948), Väinö Kehkonen
- Kalle-Kustaa Korkin seikkailut (1949), Kalle-Kustaa Korkki
- Isäpappa ja keltanokka (1950), Yrjö Tammela
- Tapahtui kaukana (1950), Research engineer
- Yhden yön hinta (1952), Punapää
- Kuollut mies kummittelee (1952), Colonel Rainer Sarmo
- Huhtikuu tulee (1953), Heikki Avovirta
- Tyttö kuunsillalta (1953), Erik Ramberg
- Niskavuoren Aarne (1954)
- Rakas lurjus (1955), Jussi Siimes
- Tyttö tuli taloon (1956), Saku
- Muuan sulhasmies (1956), Moppe
- Niskavuori taistelee (1957), Artturi Santala
- Pekka ja Pätkä mestarimaalareina (1959)
- Komisario Palmun erehdys (1960), Inspector Frans J. Palmu
- Kaasua, komisario Palmu! (1961), Inspector Frans J. Palmu
- Kultainen vasikka (1961)
- Tähdet kertovat, komisario Palmu (1962), Inspector Frans J. Palmu
- Kustaa III (1963), General Pechlin
- Vodkaa, komisario Palmu (1969), Inspector Frans J. Palmu
- Päämaja (1970), Commander-in-Chief Marshal Mannerheim
