= Elsa Turakainen =

Finnish actress (1904–1992)

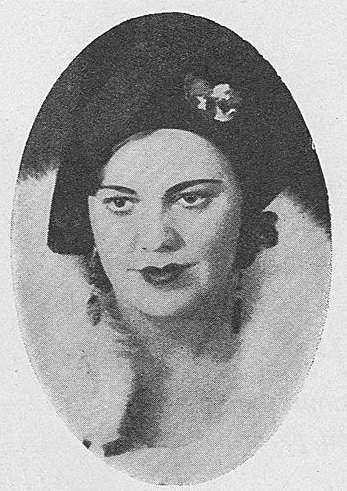
- Born: 8 August 1904; Helsinki, Finland
- Died: 7 February 1992 (aged 87)
- Occupation: Actress
- Years active: 1934-1973

Elsa Turakainen (8 August 1904 – 7 February 1992) was a Finnish actress. She appeared in more than 30 films and television shows between 1934 and 1973.

== Selected filmography ==
- Skandaali tyttökoulussa (1960)
- Little Presents (1961)
