= Irma Seikkula =

Finnish actress

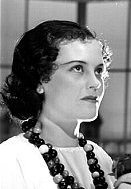
- Born: 14 May 1914; Helsinki, Finland
- Died: 8 July 2001 (aged 87); Helsinki, Finland
- Occupation: Actress
- Years active: 1937–1996

Irma Seikkula (14 May 1914 – 8 July 2001) was a Finnish actress. She appeared in 74 films and television shows between 1937 and 1996. She starred in the film Miriam, which was entered into the 8th Berlin International Film Festival.

== Selected filmography ==
- Juha (1937)
- Rikas tyttö (1938)
- Miriam (1957)
- Little Presents (1961)
- The Golden Calf (1961)
- The Diary of a Worker (1967)
