= Kaarlo Nuorvala =

Finnish writer and director

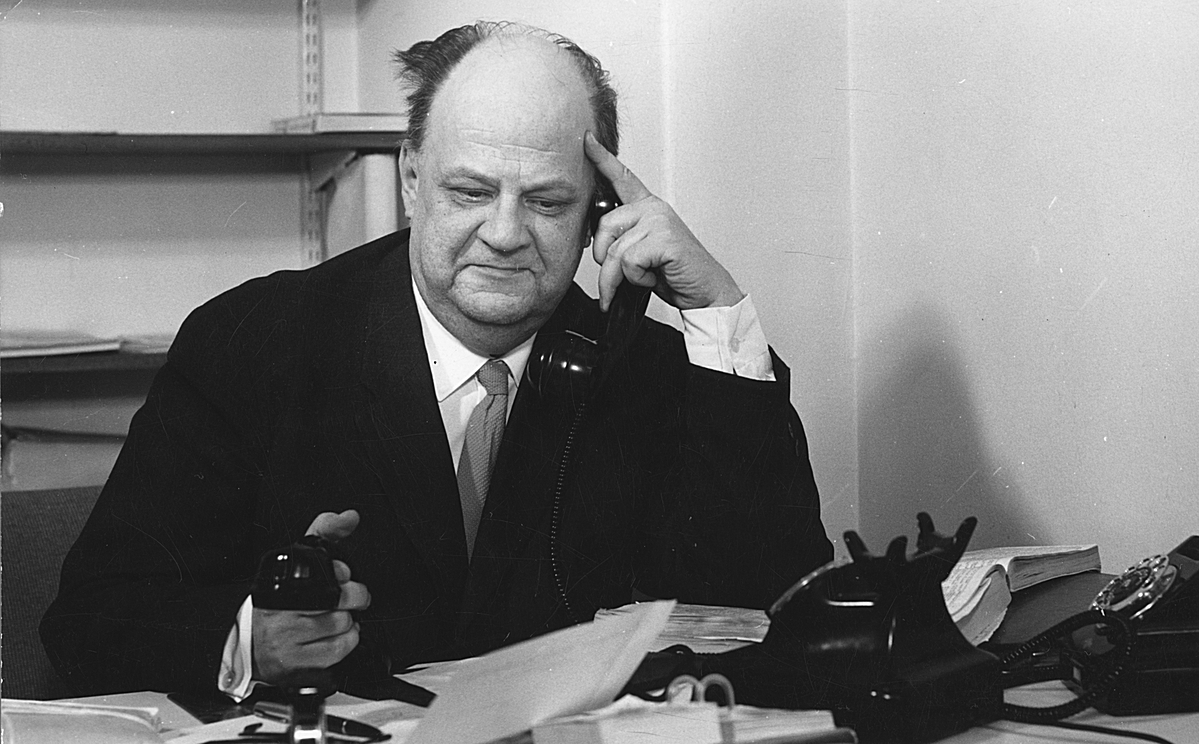
- Born: 28 June 1910; Vyborg, Russian Empire
- Died: 24 June 1967 (aged 56); Helsinki, Finland
- Writing career
- Pen name: Reino Arras, Hilkka Helovuo, Kalle Kivipää

Kaarlo Ilmari Nuorvala (formerly Nylenius; 28 June 1910 − 24 June 1967) was a Finnish writer, screenwriter and director who also made a few appearances in films as an actor. He occasionally used pseudonyms Reino Arras, Hilkka Helovuo and Kalle Kivipää.

== Career ==
Nuorvala wrote several adventure novels, detective novels and books for girls. Some of those were written under pseudonyms Bob Palmer, Roy Milton, Max Dugan and Earl Kennington. Nuorvala was most prolific in the 1940s. In 1945 alone, 27 books were published.

He was the editor-in-chief of the Finnish National Socialist Labor Organisation's magazine for a while in the summer of 1942.

== As an actor ==
- Suomalaistyttöjä Tukholmassa (1952)
- Kolmiapila (1953)
- Viettelysten tie (1955)
- Kultainen vasikka (1961)

== Selected screenplays ==
- Tukkijoella (1951)
- The Millionaire Recruit (1953)
- Alaston malli karkuteillä (1953)
- Vääpelin kauhu (1957)
- Gas, Inspector Palmu! (1961)
- The Stars Will Tell, Inspector Palmu (1962)
