= Jack Witikka =

Finnish film director

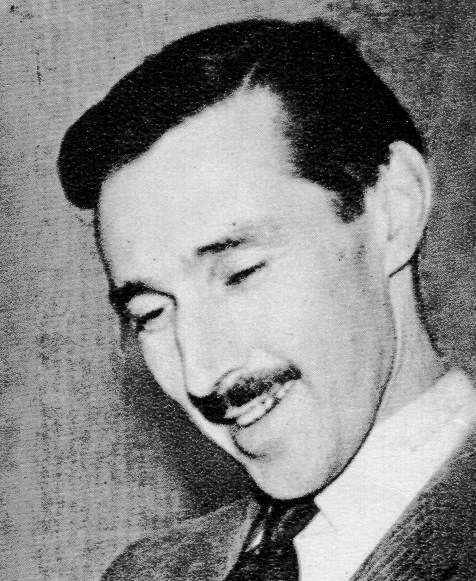
- Born: 20 December 1916; Helsinki, Uusimaa Province, Grand Duchy of Finland
- Died: 28 January 2002 (aged 85); Helsinki, Finland
- Occupations: Film director Screenwriter
- Years active: 1951-1981

Jack Witikka (20 December 1916 – 28 January 2002; surname until 1942 Jakobsson) was a Finnish film director and screenwriter. He directed 15 films between 1951 and 1968. His 1961 film Little Presents was entered into the 12th Berlin International Film Festival.

== Life and career ==
Witikka's father was Evert Jakobsson, the unofficial world record holder and Olympic representative, deputy judge and insurance director.

Witikka studied theater in England and the United States, among other places. He began his career as an advertising manager at Paramount Films Oy and as a managing director at Parvisfilm (1946–48). In 1949, Witikka started work as a director at the Finnish National Opera and Ballet, from where he moved to the Finnish National Theatre in 1953. At the theatre Witikka served as director, financial manager, (1953–57), deputy director (1957–69) and director (1969–80). After working as a freelance director for a couple of years, he became the director of the Swedish Theatre in Helsinki in 1982. He resigned in 1987. He was well known for directing modernist plays at a time when it was still rare and conservative plays were the norm. For example he staged Samuel Beckett's Endgame and Slawomir Mrozek's Tango.

Witikka began making short films in the late 1940s. He was awarded the Jussi Award for Best Short Film for the 1949 film Before the Premiere. His feature film directorial debut was Aila – Pohjolan tytär (international title: Arctic Fury) (1951). Michael Powell was a producer of the film, alongside Witikka and Blomberg. The film was initially planned for international distribution, but it failed to reach expected popularity in Finland. Cinematographer Erik Blomberg was awarded a Jussi for his work on the film.

In 1954, Witikka's fantasy film Pessi ja Illusia was completed, based on a fairy-tale ballet composed by Ahti Sonninen based on Yrjö Koko. Prior to that, the biography of the composer Gabriel Linsén, Mä oksalla ylimmällä, had premiered, through which Witikka's collaboration with author Walentin Chorell began. It continued with the expressionist adult fairy tale film The Puppet Dealer and the Beautiful Lilith (1955). It is the story of an anonymous state where play is prohibited. Absurdist comedy Motherless (1958), which Witikka had arranged for the theater, was the third joint project of Chorell and Witikka. It is full of sexual symbolism, special characters and situations. Maikki Länsiö's deliberately over-played role character was praised. Motherless is a rare example of an almost surreal Finnish film.

Between the last two Chorell films, Witikka directed Silja - Sleeping Young (1956), a second film adaptation of Frans Emil Sillanpää's classic novel of the same name. The first was directed by Teuvo Tulio in 1937, but all its copies were destroyed in the fire of the Adams film studio in 1959. The screenwriter for the Sillanpää filming was Juha Nevalainen, who wrote the screenplay for Edvin Laine's The Unknown Soldier. Nevalainen and Witikka continued their collaboration in the film Man from this Star (1958). It was a starkly realistic depiction of an alcoholic that had not been seen in a Finnish film before. The actors did not wear any stage makeup.

In the following years, Witikka's film career continued mainly with light comedies such as Virtaset and Lahtiset (1959) and Iloinen Linnanmäki (1960). They were Witikka’s only color films, but critics didn’t appreciate them.

Witikka's last film was Little Presents (1961), which was an adaptation of Simo Puupponen's novel of the same name. A warm tale of the residents of a Helsinki-based wooden house block has been considered as one of Witikka's best.

Witikka was the first chairman of the National Audiovisual Institute, founded in 1957, in 1957–67.

In 1945–1959, Witikka was married to Lilli Anita Soini, the daughter of opera singer Oiva Soini. From 1961, Witikka's wife was actress Tea Ista

Witikka died on 28 January 2022 at the age of 85 after a prolonged illness. He is buried in the Hietaniemi Cemetery in Helsinki.

== Selected filmography ==
- Aila – Pohjolan tytär (also known as Arctic Fury) (1951)
- The Doll Merchant (1955)
- A Man from This Star (1958)
- Little Presents (1961)
