= The Stars Will Tell, Inspector Palmu =

Tähdet kertovat, komisario Palmu
- Directed by: Matti Kassila
- Written by: Matti Kassila
- Based on: Tähdet kertovat, komisario Palmu by Mika Waltari
- Produced by: Mauno Mäkelä
- Starring: Joel Rinne; Matti Ranin; Leo Jokela; Helge Herala; Esko Salminen
- Cinematography: Esko Töyri
- Edited by: Juho Gartz
- Music by: Osmo Lindeman
- Production company: Fennada-Filmi
- Distributed by: Adams Filmi
- Release date: 7 September 1962
- Running time: 95 minutes
- Country: Finland
- Language: Finnish

The Stars Will Tell, Inspector Palmu (Finnish: Tähdet kertovat, komisario Palmu) is a 1962 Finnish comedy-crime film directed by Matti Kassila. It is the third film in the Inspector Palmu series and the second one produced by Fennada-Filmi. The novel was written by Waltari through the explicit request by director Kassila. It is also the last film in the series to be shot in black and white. The fourth film was made without Waltari's involvement.

== Plot ==
A body is found in the Observatory Hill (Tähtitorninmäki) park in Helsinki. The police are called in, believing him to be a dead vagrant. However, tabloid journalist Nopsanen happens by the scene, leading to the death being publicized in the papers that same afternoon. The victim is eventually identified as accountant and astrologist Fredrik Nordberg.

While Virta tries to keep the press at bay, Palmu discovers that Nordberg's niece Saara lived with him and that Nordberg financially supported her and her boyfriend Ville. Ville is a greaser and later found to be in the possession of Nordberg's telescope, which the police first suspect has been stolen. Though Ville is arrested, it soon becomes evident that Nordberg's fortune came from black-mail and that he was killed because he witnessed a murder while using his telescope on the Observatory Hill which gives a wide view to the city.

== Characters ==
- Inspector Palmu – Still an inspector but now outranked by Virta, he now has to follow his lead. (Played by Joel Rinne)
- Master of Laws Toivo Virta – Previously Palmu's intellectual assistant detective, he now outranks Palmu in the department and therefore leads the investigation. (Played by Matti Ranin)
- Detective Väinö Kokki – A jack-of-all-trades detective with many useful contacts. In this movie he answers to both Palmu and Virta who leads the investigation. (Played by Leo Jokela)
- Fredrik Nordberg – The victim, an astrologist, supporting his niece and her boyfriend. Unlike the other victims in Palmu movies, his face is never seen and no actor is credited for his role.
- Saara Pohjanvuori – Nordberg's niece who lived with him and whose uncle was very supportive of her and Ville. Palmu deduces that she is pregnant to Ville. Her last name is a finnicized version of the name "Nordberg" or "Northern Mountain". (Played by Maija-Leena Soinne)
- Ville Valkonen – Saara's boyfriend who becomes the prime suspect when he takes Nordberg's telescope from Tähtitorninmäki. He belongs into a greaser gang. (Played by Esko Salminen)
- Pimu – One of Ville's greaser friends who was with him during the night of the murder. She is sexually promiscuous, which irritates the otherwise woman-friendly Palmu. She also has a liking to Ville and later Toivo Virta. (Played by Sointu Angervo)
- Arska – One of Ville's greaser friends who is arrested for questioning. (Played by Orma Aunio)
- Major Carl Gustaf Vadenblick – Becomes the prime suspect of the murder case after Palmu becomes suspicious of the details surrounding the suicide of his mentally ill wife. He lives in a countryside mansion due to his current wife's nervousness. An ex-major with strong right wing view of the world. His appearance and mannerisms are clearly modelled after Adolf Hitler. (Played by Helge Herala)
- Mrs. Annika Vadenblick (née Melkonen) – Vadenblick's current wife with whom he has a son. Vandenblick allegedly moved to the countryside so that her wife could rest her nerves. (Played by Aino Mantsas)
- Journalist Nopsanen – The journalist who happens upon the murder scene first. He causes much head-ache for Palmu and his associates when his pictures of the dead Nordberg are printed in the newspapers. (Played by Pentti Siimes)

== The Murderer ==
The murderer turns out to be Major Vadenblick. He murdered Fredrik Nordberg when he began black-mailing Vadenblick, having accidentally witnessed him push his wife off the balcony of their luxurious apartment. It was thought Vadenblick's wife committed suicide. Virta and Kokki witness Vadenblick almost push her current wife off the lake-side cliff when a shot from his son's air-rifle distracts him. When Palmu, Virta and Kokki make it clear they know he murdered Nordberg, Vadenblick tries to shoot them but misses and instead hits his own son who was listening through the door crack.

He tries to escape the mansion grounds firing his rifle at Virta and Kokki. He is stopped by journalist Nopsanen who shoots him in the leg from a tree branch where he has been spying on Palmu and his crew, despite their warning not to follow up on the murder investigation. Nopsanen served under Vandenblick during the Continuation War and revealed to Palmu and company that Vandenblick had sent a soldier to die on one occasion on a pointless assault.

Vadenblick's guilt is made almost immediately evident by his harsh manner, his strong views on why Finland lost in the Continuation War and the extremely demeaning tone in which he speaks to his wife. In addition his appearance is clearly modelled after Adolf Hitler (and his manners possibly after Charlie Chaplin's portrayal of Hitler in The Great Dictator) which even leads Nopsanen to write him up in his notes as "a crazy nazi".
