= Skandaali tyttökoulussa =

1960 film

- Original Finnish film poster
- Directed by: Edvin Laine
- Written by: Robert Kiljander
- Produced by: T. J. Särkkä
- Starring: Liisa Nevalainen
- Release date: 29 April 1960
- Running time: 106 minutes
- Country: Finland
- Language: Finnish

Skandaali tyttökoulussa (English: Scandal in the Girls' School) is a 1960 Finnish comedy, drama film directed by Edvin Laine. The film was entered into the 2nd Moscow International Film Festival.

== Cast ==
- Liisa Nevalainen as Sanny Kortman
- Elsa Turakainen as Hilja Eufrosyne Forslund
- Hilkka Helinä as Olga Kauppala
- Elina Salo as Liisa 'Liisi' Kortman
- Leo Riuttu as Lassinen, Teacher
- Kosti Klemelä as Amos Pölkkynen
- Martti Romppanen as Veikko 'Nalle' Vuorela
- Liisa Roine as Anna Tapper
- Seija Haarala as Helmi Hallman
- Elina Ollikainen as Inkeri
- Rose-Marie Precht as Kerttu
