= Nils Holm (film editor) =

Finnish film editor (1922–2009)

Nils Gustaf "Nisse" Holm (11 June 1922 − 30 December 2009) was a Finnish film editor. During his career, he worked as an editor in more than 50 films. Since the 1950s, he mainly worked for television.

== Partial filmography ==
- Noita palaa elämään (1952)
- Kuningas kulkureitten (1953)
- Kummituskievari (1954)
- Elokuu (1956)
- Lasisydän (1959)
- Kaasua, komisario Palmu! (1961)
- Tähdet kertovat, komisario Palmu (1962)
