= Ritva Arvelo =

Finnish actress, film director and screenwriter

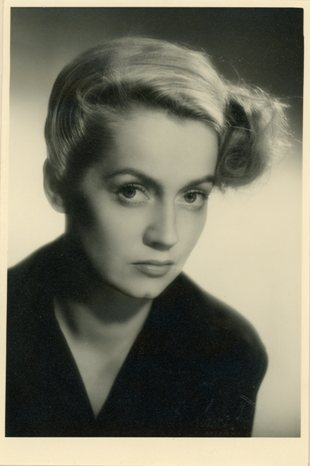
Ritva Arvelo in the 1940s

Ritva Helinä Arvelo (11 March 1921 – 26 October 2013) was a Finnish actress, director, screenwriter and a pioneer in modern dance.

She was one of the first four Finnish women film directors.

== Life and career ==
Arvelo was born in Helsinki. Arvelo attended the first course of the Helsinki Theatre Academy in 1943 and also graduated with a master's degree in romance philology from the University of Helsinki. In the 1940s, she worked as a dancer in Maggie Gripenberg's internationally acclaimed champion group and worked as a model for fashion salons in Helsinki.

During her career, Arvelo worked for the Finnish National Theatre and appeared in such films as Radio tekee murron (1951), Kilroy sen teki (1957), Nothing but Love (1984) and Burning Angel (1984). She also worked as a director at the Helsinki Folk Theater-Workers' Theater and the Intimate Theater, co-founded the Praesens dance group in 1961 with Raija Riikkala and led it. In 1968, Arvelo published the pamphlet The Closed Bath of Our Theater (Folk Culture 1968). Her directorial work at the National Theater included modern European drama and Finnish versions of American musicals. In addition, she translated French plays into Finnish. In 1961, she became only the fourth Finnish female film director when she directed a film Kultainen vasikka, based on a play by Maria Jotuni. The film received the state film award and a Jussi Award for actor Helge Herala. This remains her only directorial effort.

As a screenwriter, Arvelo worked with Matti Kassila on his films Syntipukki (1957) and Kuriton sukupolvi (1957). She also wrote the screenplay for Kultainen vasikka. In 1961, Arvelo was one of the founding members of the modern dance group Praesens.

In the 1980s, Arvelo continued to star in Anssi Mänttäri's films Nothing but Love (1984) and Farewell, Goodbye (1986). She also played a small role in Lauri Törhönen's film Burning Angel (1984). For personal reasons, she withdrew entirely from the entertainment industry and the public in the mid-1980s.

== Personal life ==
Arvelo was married twice: in 1948–1953 with actor Matti Oravisto and in 1955–1965 with actor Heikki Savolainen. She had the children Meri (1949–1980) and Hannu (b. 1951) with Oravisto and Satu (b. 1958) with Savolainen. Meri Oravisto starred in the film Pilvilinna in 1970 and Hannu in the film Kesäkapina.

Ritva Arvelo's father was Deputy Judge Armas Peter Arvelo (formerly Achrén; 1886–1966), who served as general manager of the prison from 1920 to 1945. Mother Lempi Arvelo was a patron of the theater.

== Selected filmography ==
- Valkoisen neilikan velho (1945)
- Suopursu kukkii (1947)
- Kultamitalivaimo (1947)
- Kultainen vasikka (1961)
- Kesäkapina (1970)
- Näkemiin, hyvästi (1986)
