= Vilho Siivola =

Finnish actor and director (1910–1984)

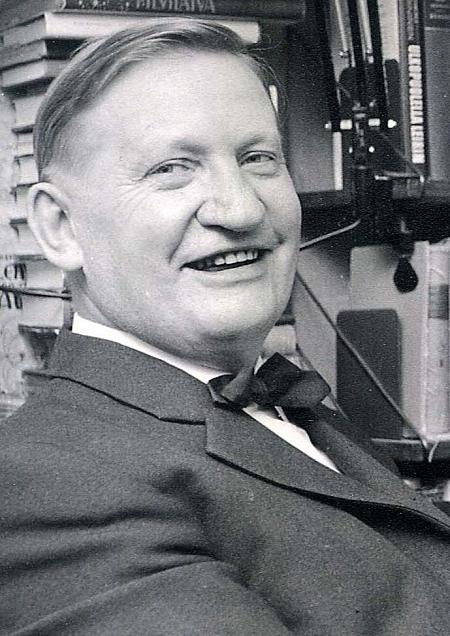
- Vilho Siivola
- Born: 10 April 1910; Valkeakoski, Finland
- Died: 28 November 1984 (aged 74); Helsinki, Finland

Vilho Siivola (10 April 1910 – 28 November 1984) was a Finnish actor, film director, television director and a member of the Council of Theatre.

== Biography ==
Siivola was born in Valkeakoski. His career included theatre, where he was both an actor and a director, motion pictures and television. Notably, in 1953 he was one of the founders of 'Kivi-juhlat’ (a theatre festival based in the childhood town of Aleksis Kivi) and was its first director in 1977. In addition he wrote two books, Myllykylästä Maailmalle (1975) and Maailmassa Maailmaa (1983). He died, aged 74, in Helsinki.
