= Leo Riuttu =

Finnish actor

- Born: 5 June 1913; Tampere, Finland
- Died: 4 August 1989 (aged 76); Helsinki, Finland
- Occupation: Actor
- Years active: 1946–1978

Leo Riuttu (5 June 1913 – 4 August 1989) was a Finnish actor. He appeared in 81 films and television shows between 1946 and 1978. He starred in the film Miriam, which was entered into the 8th Berlin International Film Festival. He is buried in the Hietaniemi Cemetery in Helsinki.

== Selected filmography ==
- Kvinnan bakom allt (1951)
- Hilma's Name Day (1954)
- The Unknown Soldier (1955)
- Miriam (1957)
- Skandaali tyttökoulussa (1960)
- Little Presents (1961)
- Oppenheimerin tapaus (1967)
