= Esko Töyri =

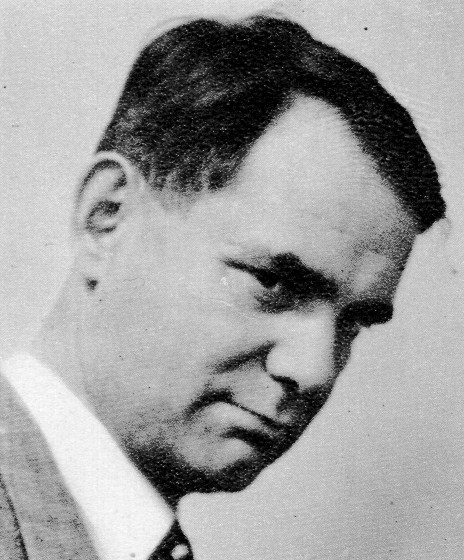

Esko Emil Töyri (until 1935 Törnroos; 6 October 1915 – 4 November 1992) was a Finnish film cinematographer and director. During his career, he won three Jussi Awards for best cinematography; in 1949 for films Vain kaksi tuntia and Hornankoski, in 1950 for films Katupeilin takana, Rosvo Roope and Hallin Janne, and in 1953 for Noita palaa elämään.

== Selected filmography as a cinematographer ==
- Sellaisena kuin sinä minut halusit (1944)
- Houkutuslintu (1946)
- Pikajuna pohjoiseen (1947)
- Rosvo Roope (1949)
- Putkinotko (1954)
- Lain mukaan (1956)
- Kultainen vasikka (1961)
- Tähdet kertovat, komisario Palmu (1962)
- Hopeaa rajan takaa (1963)

== Selected filmography as director ==
- Shamrock (1953)
