= The Golden Calf (1961 film) =

Kultainen vasikka
- Directed by: Ritva Arvelo
- Written by: Ritva Arvelo
- Based on: Kultainen vasikka by Maria Jotuni
- Produced by: Mauno Mäkelä
- Cinematography: Esko Töyri
- Edited by: Ossi Skurnik
- Music by: Osmo Lindeman
- Production company: Fennada-Filmi
- Release date: 24 November 1961 (Finland)
- Running time: 85 minutes
- Country: Finland
- Language: Finnish

Kultainen vasikka (The Golden Calf) is a 1961 Finnish comedy film directed by Ritva Arvelo in her only feature film direction. Based on the play of the same name by Maria Jotuni, the film combines elements of comedy and melodrama. Arvelo had previously directed the play in the theater.

== Plot ==
Set during the time of the First World War in Porvoo, the film follows a group of characters whose lives are driven by greed and the dream of quick wealth. Katariina Ahlroos and her husband, photographer Herman Ahlroos, are an older couple whose daughter, Eedit Honka, is married to Jaakko Honka but aspires for a better life. The younger daughter, Lahja Ahlroos, is an innocent and open-hearted woman infatuated with the shy Karhu. Both Katariina and Eedit value money over their relationships.

== Reception ==
Upon its release, Kultainen vasikka was well received by contemporary critics. Erkka Lehtola of Aamulehti praised the film, noting: "Arvelo’s first film, Kultainen vasikka, pleasantly surprises the viewer." However, some reviewers criticized the theatrical nature of the film, with Matti Savo (Kansan Uutiset) calling the attempts to conceal it outdated.

Later evaluations consider the film significant and well-acted, noting its comedic undertone despite its serious themes. The movie has been recognized as one of the highlights of Finnish cinema. The music by Osmo Lindeman, regarded as one of Finland's most original film composers, is noted for its nuanced reflection of the film's events.

== Awards ==
- Finnish State Film Award (1961)
- Jussi Award for Best Actor – Helge Herala (1961)

== Cast ==
- Aino Mantsas as Eedit Honka
- Helge Herala as Jaakko Honka
- Marja Korhonen as Katariina Ahlroos
- Toivo Mäkelä as photographer Herman Ahlroos
- Irma Seikkula as Anna Aaltonen
- Elina Salo as Lahja Ahlroos
- Jarno Hiilloskorpi as Karhu
- Maija Karhi as Liina
- Eila Pehkonen as Aliina, the Honkas' servant
- Joel Rinne as Councilor Maunu G. Somero
