= Elina Salo =

Finnish actress (1936–2025)

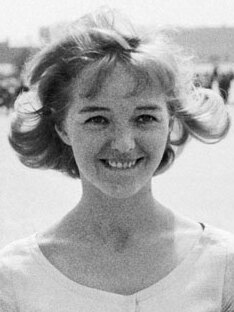
- Salo in 1961
- Born: Aino Elina Salo; 9 March 1936; Sipoo, Finland
- Died: 23 October 2025 (aged 89)
- Other name: Aino Elina Maisala
- Occupation: Actress
- Years active: 1956–2011
- Spouse: Pertti Maisala (m. 1963–1975)

Aino Elina Salo (9 March 1936 – 23 October 2025) was a Finnish film, theatre and television actress. She also worked in radio as a voice actor in children's programming. In her career that began in 1956, Salo appeared in over 50 films and television shows and is known for her appearances in several of Aki Kaurismäki's films. She was also the voice of Little My in the Finnish dub of Moomin.

Salo received three Jussi Awards for her work. In 2010, she received the Ordre des Arts et des Lettres (Commandeur).

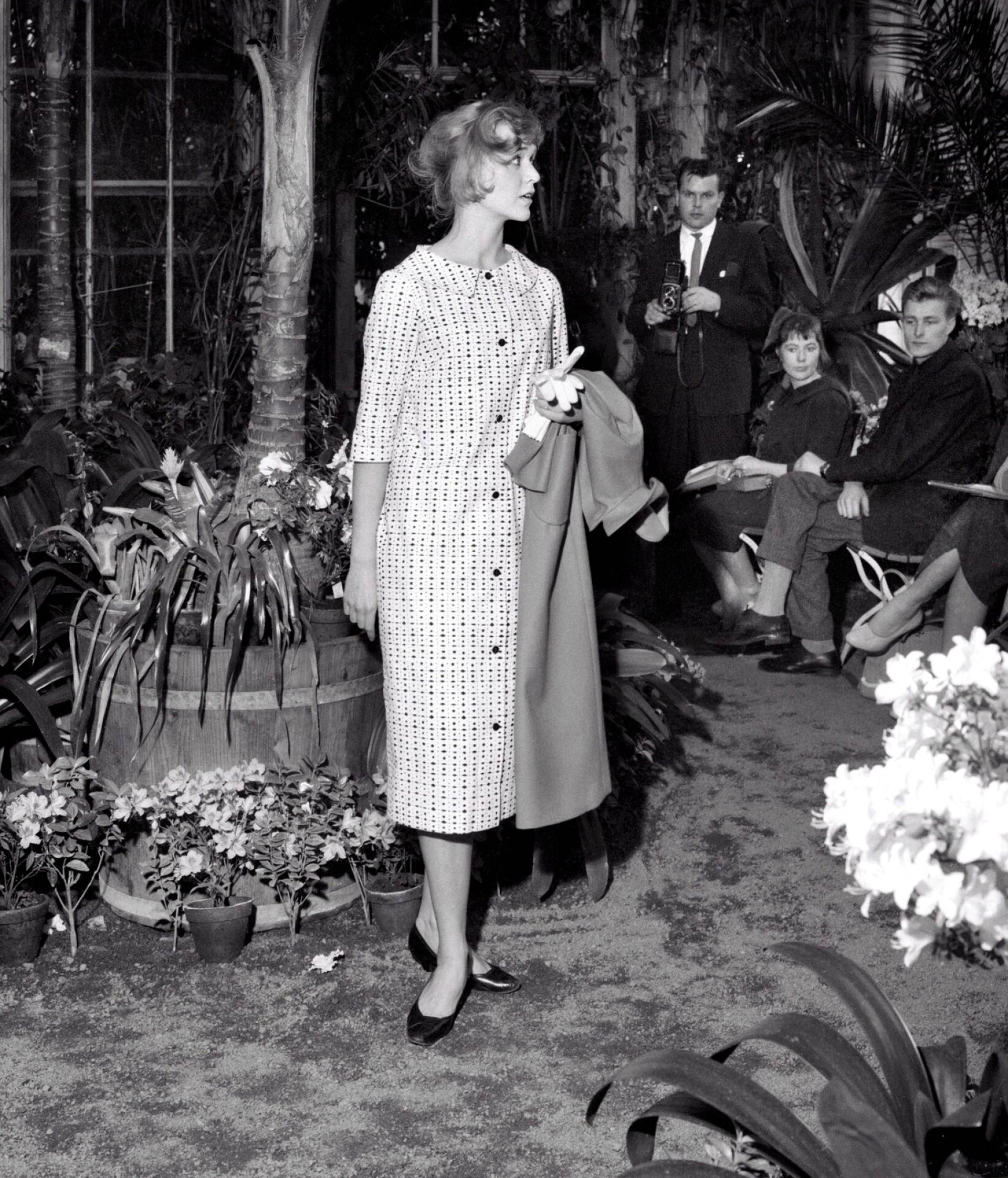
Salo presenting clothes designed by Vuokko Nurmesniemi at a fashion show in the Helsinki Botanical Garden in 1958

Salo was born in Sipoo, Finland. She lived mainly in France, and died on 23 October 2025, at the age of 89.

== Partial filmography ==
- Skandaali tyttökoulussa (1960)
- Inspector Palmu's Mistake (1960)
- Gas, Inspector Palmu! (1961)
- The Golden Calf (1961)
- The Diary of a Worker (1967)
- Harry Munter (1970)
- Gangsterfilmen (1974)
- Poet and Muse (1978)
- Herr Puntila and His Servant Matti (1979)
- Hamlet Goes Business (1987)
- The Match Factory Girl (1990)
- Take Care of Your Scarf, Tatiana (1994)
- Drifting Clouds (1996)
- Juha (1999)
- The Man Without a Past (2002)
- Le Havre (2011)
