= Red Line (1959 film) =

1959 film

- Finnish film poster
- Directed by: Matti Kassila
- Written by: Ilmari Kianto; Matti Kassila
- Produced by: Mauno Mäkelä
- Starring: Holger Salin; Liisa Nevalainen; Jussi Jurkka
- Cinematography: Esko Nevalainen
- Edited by: Ossi Skurnik
- Music by: Osmo Lindeman
- Production company: Fennada-Filmi
- Release date: 4 September 1959
- Running time: 97 minutes
- Country: Finland
- Language: Finnish
- Budget: FIM 25,415,861

Red Line (Finnish: Punainen viiva) is a 1959 Finnish drama film directed by Matti Kassila. The screenplay by Kassila is based on the 1909 novel of the same name by Ilmari Kianto. The film was entered into the 1st Moscow International Film Festival; however, the reception at the film festival was poor due to the exaggerated character of a social democratic agitator (played by Jussi Jurkka) and weak quality of the film's subtitles.

In 1959, the film won five Jussi Awards in the following categories: Best Screenplay (Matti Kassila), Best Original Score (Osmo Lindeman), Best Actor (Holger Salin), Best Supporting Actor (Jussi Jurkka) and Best Supporting Actress (Rakel Laakso).

== Plot ==
The film dates back to critical points in Finnish history, until 1906, when a new law guaranteeing universal and equal suffrage was enacted, and until 1907, when the Finnish people went to the parliamentary election for the first time to draw a "red line." The main characters are Romppainen's couple, Topi and Riika, who live in a backwood cottage with their five children. The knowledge of the election and the hope for change will bring faith to the future of the poor family at Christmas.

== Cast ==
- Holger Salin as Topi Romppanen
- Liisa Nevalainen as Riika Romppanen
- Petri Tanner as Sake
- Jukka Eklund as Vesteri
- Marianne Eronen as Petti
- Terhi Virtanen as Iita Linta Maria
- Tiina Jokela as Pirjeri
- Jussi Jurkka as Agitator Puntarpää
- Rakel Laakso as Kunilla
- Tarmo Manni as Simana Arhippaini
- Pentti Irjala as Shoemaker Raappana
- Tyyne Haarla as Cupper Kaisa
- Toivo Mäkelä as Jussi Kettuvaara
