= Hilma's Name Day =

- Original Finnish film poster
- Finnish: Hilmanpäivät
- Directed by: Matti Kassila
- Written by: Matti Kassila
- Based on: Hilmanpäivät by Agapetus
- Produced by: Toivo Särkkä
- Starring: Matti Ranin; Aino Mantsas; Tauno Palo; Edvin Laine
- Cinematography: Kalle Peronkoski
- Edited by: Armas Vallasvuo
- Music by: Heikki Aaltoila
- Production company: Suomen Filmiteollisuus
- Release date: 8 October 1954
- Running time: 77 minutes
- Country: Finland
- Language: Finnish

Hilma's Name Day (Finnish: Hilmanpäivät) is a 1954 Finnish romantic comedy film written and directed by Matti Kassila. It is based on the 1936 novel by Agapetus, telling the story of a small village preparing to celebrate the shopkeeper's wife's name day when a fire breaks out in the night and turns out to be more difficult to put out than expected. The film stars Matti Ranin, Aino Mantsas, Tauno Palo and Edvin Laine.

Like the novel, Kassila wanted set the film in the 1930s, and for that, a possible authentic shooting environment was needed to get the impression of the period. In the end, a suitable destination can be found in the Nurmijärvi village, where the film was filmed.

The film received a positive reception from critics when it was released. In 1955, the film won two Jussi Awards: for best direction (Matti Kassila) and best set design (Aarre Koivisto).

== Cast ==
- Matti Ranin as Heikki, a young judge
- Aino Mantsas as a girl from post office
- Tauno Palo as Yrjö, an old judge
- Edvin Laine as Kalervo Verto, a shopkeeper and firechief
- Kaija Paasi as Hilma Verto, a shopkeeper's wife
- Vieno Kekkonen as a pharmacy girl
- Salli Karuna as Eeva, a housekeeper of old judge
- Tarmo Manni as Mr. Kipala, a blacksmith
- Pentti Irjala as an old man of Vekkula
- Oke Tuuri as Alpertti, a cab driver
- Arvo Lehesmaa as a pharmacist
- Leo Riuttu as a doctor

The film's producer Toivo Särkkä is seen in a cameo role among the party guests.

== Reception ==
Hilma's Name Day has often been called one of Kassila's best directorial works, and even Agapetus, who wrote the original novel, is said to have been exceptionally pleased with the result.

Leo Nordberg from Uusi Suomi called the film as Kassila's "most intact work up to that point", adding that he also appreciates the film's "homely Finnish tone". Paula Talaskivi from Helsingin Sanomat wrote that "Kassila has done more work than usual for his portrayal of people." Also, the acting work of Tauno Palo and Edvin Laine was praised across the board. Timo Malmi from Ilta-Sanomat estimates that "Edvin Laine in particular has the role of his life as the chief of the volunteer fire department in this warm Agapetus film adaptation."

== See also ==
- List of Finnish films of the 1950s
