= Mauno Mäkelä =

Finnish film producer (1916–1987)

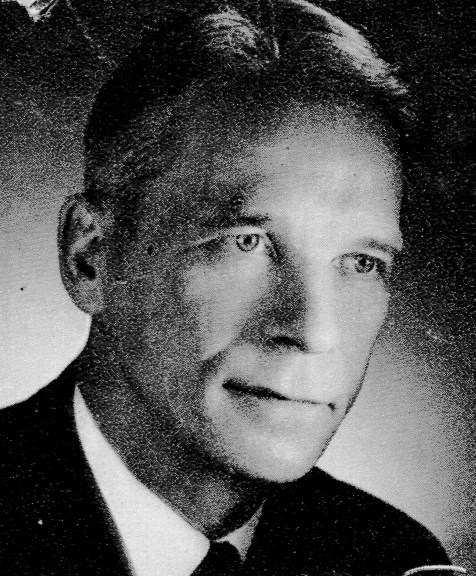

Mauno Ilmari Mäkelä (7 March 1916 – 17 October 1987) was a Finnish film producer. He also appeared as an actor in films Iskelmäketju (1959) and Trust (1976).

Mäkelä received a Jussi Award for producing the film Elokuu (1956).

== Selected filmography as producer ==
- Ratavartijan kaunis Inkeri (1950)
- Noita palaa elämään (1952)
- Lumikki ja 7 jätkää (1953)
- Ryysyrannan Jooseppi (1955)
- Poika eli kesäänsä (1955)
- Villi Pohjola (1955)
- Kuriton sukupolvi (1957)
- Punainen viiva (1959)
- Kultainen vasikka (1961)
- Kaasua, komisario Palmu! (1961)
