= Aino Mantsas =

Finnish actress (1922–1979)

Aino Mantsas (29 November 1922, Helsinki – 24 January 1979) was a Finnish actress. She worked for various theatres and appeared in films. She was married to director Matti Kassila from 1948 until her death, and was cast in many of his films, such as Radio tekee murron (1951), Hilman päivät (1954) and Komisario Palmun erehdys (1961).

Aino Mantsas died of breast cancer in 1979. In his memoir Mustaa ja valkoista, Matti Kassila describes Mantsas as a "talented, exceptional human being who found it hard to adjust to the world surrounding her".

== Selected filmography ==
- Ruusu ja kulkuri (1948)
- Hilman päivät (1954)
- Syntipukki (1957)
- Kultainen vasikka (1961)
- Täällä Pohjantähden alla (1968)
- Pohjantähti (1973)
