= Matti Ranin =

Finnish actor (1926–2013)

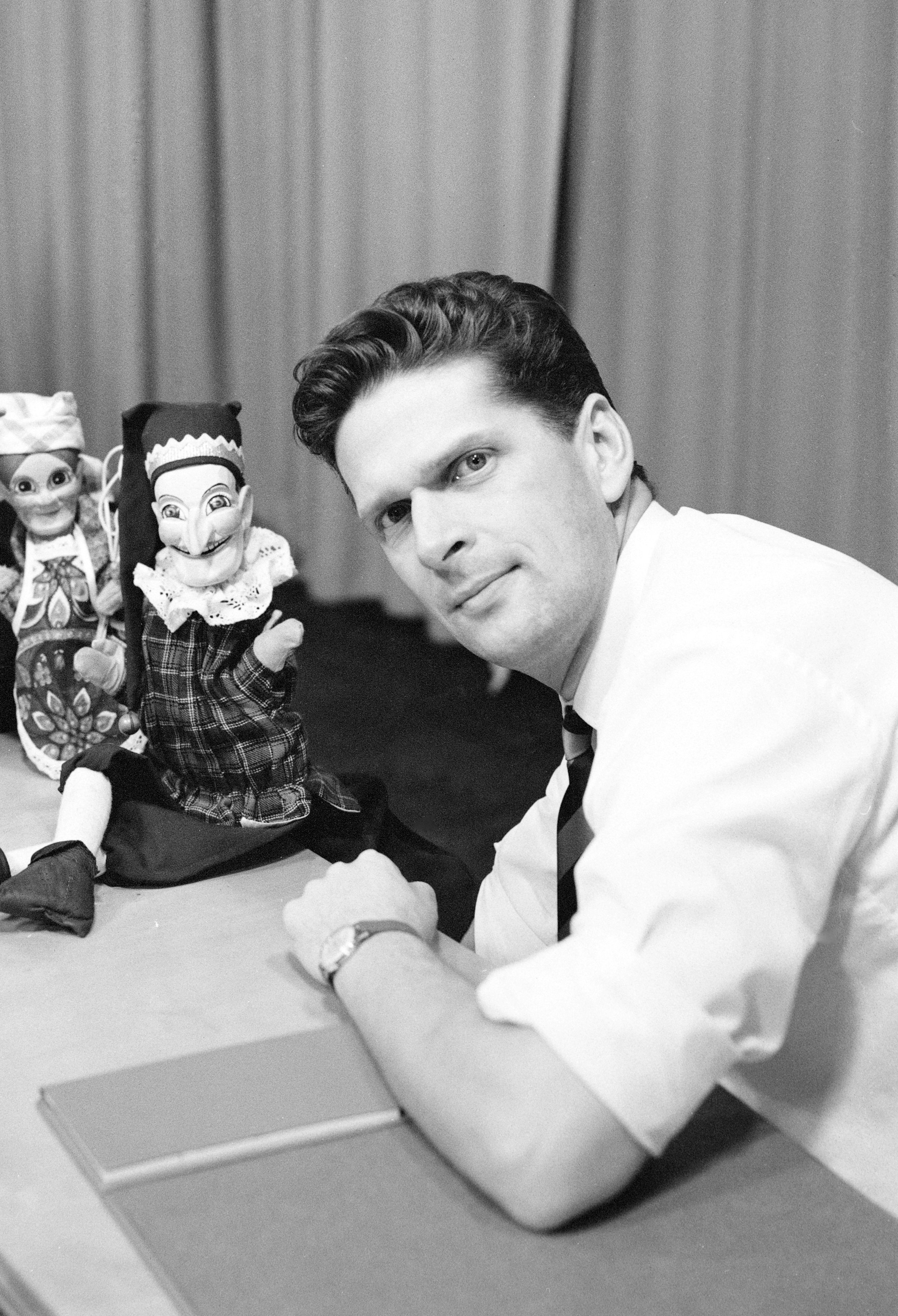
- Matti Ranin in 1964.
- Born: Matti Helge Ranin; 21 November 1926; Tampere, Finland
- Died: 24 November 2013 (aged 87); Helsinki, Finland
- Occupations: Actor, director
- Years active: 1927–2011

Matti Helge Ranin (21 November 1926 – 24 November 2013) was a Finnish actor.

== Career ==
Ranin had an extensive career as a film actor. In his most notable period in the 1950s and 60s, he was most famous for playing Captain Kariluoto in the Edvin Laine version of The Unknown Soldier. He also had a recurring role as Toivo Virta in the Inspector Palmu films and appeared as Lauri Salpakari in Here, Beneath the North Star, the 1968 film adaption of Väinö Linna's novel trilogy Under the North Star.

Ranin also acted extensively as a voice-over artist for children's audio books, cartoons and TV shows. He became known as the voice of the puppet horse Histamiini, a TV series based on children's books by Raili Mikkanen. Ranin also directed various Finnish dubs of animated films from 1981 to 1992, including The Little Mermaid in 1990 and Beauty and The Beast in 1992. Ranin was also a voice actor in the Finnish dubs of various animated films and series, where his performances included Doc in Snow White and The Seven Dwarfs and Maurice in Beauty and The Beast. Ranin also had long-running television roles as Pentti Karvala in the hospital drama Ihmeiden tekijät and as Kaarlo Kares on the soap opera Kotikatu.

== Selected filmography ==
In films

- Loviisa – Niskavuoren nuori emäntä (1946)
- Ruma Elsa (1949)
- Kanavan laidalla (1949)
- Shamrock (1953)
- Hilman päivät (1954)
- The Unknown Soldier (1955)
- Inspector Palmu's Mistake (1960)
- Here, Beneath the North Star (1968)
- Akseli and Elina (1970)
- Tie naisen sydämeen (1996)

On television

- Oppenheimerin tapaus (1967)
- Joulukalenteri (1980, 1985)
- Mustapartainen mies (1990)
- Blondi tuli taloon (1994–1995)
- Ihmeiden tekijät (1996–1998)
- Parhaat vuodet (2000–2002)
- Kotikatu (2004–2009)
- Taivaan tulet (2011)
