= Matti Kassila =

Finnish film director and screenwriter

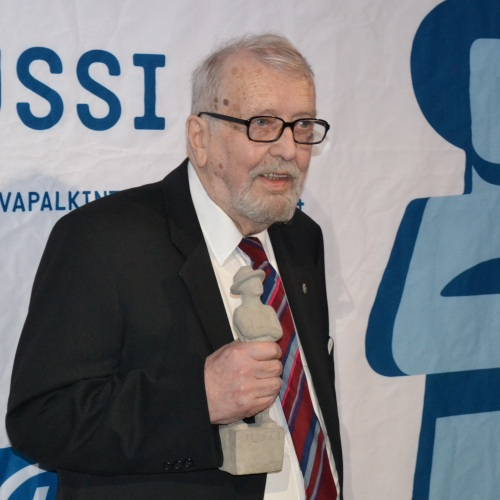
- Matti Kassila in the Jussi Award ceremony in 2011.
- Born: 12 January 1924; Keuruu, Finland
- Died: 13 December 2018 (aged 94); Vantaa, Finland
- Occupation: Film director
- Notable work: Radio tekee murron, Komisario Palmun erehdys
- Partner: Aino Mantsas
- Awards: Concrete Jussi Award for lifetime achievements, 2010

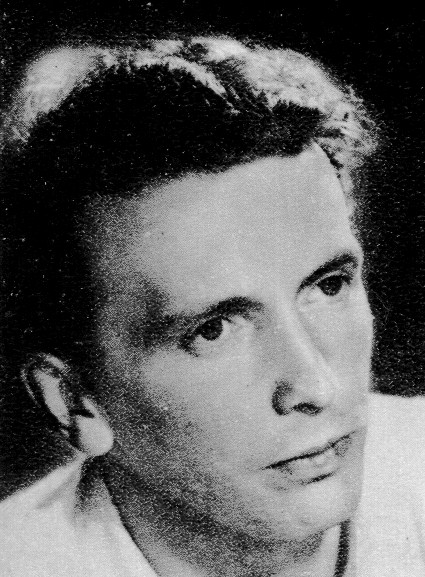
Young Matti Kassila

Matti Kassila (12 January 1924 – 13 December 2018) was a Finnish film director who achieved fame as one of the most prominent Finnish filmmakers in the 1950s and 1960s. He is most famous for the series of four Inspector Palmu movies, based on the character created by Mika Waltari. During his long career, he won seven Jussi Awards, including a concrete Jussi for lifetime achievement, and received numerous other commendations. His 1959 film Punainen viiva was entered into the 1st Moscow International Film Festival. He was also one of the screenwriters for the 1968 film Here, Beneath the North Star, directed by Edvin Laine.

== Films directed by Kassila ==
- Isäntä soittaa hanuria (1949)
- Professori Masa (1950)
- Maija löytää sävelen (1950)
- Lakeuksien lukko (1951)
- Radio tekee murron (1951)
- Radio tulee hulluksi (1952)
- Varsovan laulu (1953)
- Tyttö kuunsillalta (1953)
- Sininen viikko (1954)
- Hilmanpäivät (1954)
- Isän vanha ja uusi (1955)
- Pastori Jussilainen (1955)
- Elokuu (1956)
- Kuriton sukupolvi (1957)
- Syntipukki (1957)
- Punainen viiva (1959)
- Lasisydän (1959)
- Komisario Palmun erehdys (1960)
- Tulipunainen kyyhkynen (1961)
- Kaasua, komisario Palmu! (1961)
- Tähdet kertovat, komisario Palmu (1962)
- Kolmen kaupungin kasvot (1963)
- Äl’ yli päästä perhanaa (1968)
- Vodkaa, komisario Palmu (1969)
- Päämaja (1970)
- Aatamin puvussa ja vähän Eevankin (1971)
- Haluan rakastaa, Peter (1972)
- Meiltähän tämä käy (1973)
- Natalia (1979)
- Niskavuori (1984)
- Jäähyväiset presidentille (1987)
- Ihmiselon ihanuus ja kurjuus (1988)
- Kaikki pelissä (1994)
