= Light Melody =

- Finnish: Kirkastuva sävel
- Directed by: Edvin Laine
- Written by: Olavi Veistäjä
- Produced by: T.J. Särkkä
- Starring: Kalle Ruusunen; Veli-Matti Kaitala; Ruth Luoma-aho
- Cinematography: Felix Forsman; Kalle Peronkoski
- Edited by: Armas Vallasvuo
- Music by: Heikki Aaltoila
- Production company: Suomen Filmiteollisuus
- Distributed by: Suomen Filmiteollisuus
- Release date: 8 November 1946
- Running time: 104 minutes
- Country: Finland
- Language: Finnish

Light Melody (Finnish: Kirkastuva sävel) is a 1946 Finnish musical comedy-drama film directed by Edvin Laine and starring Kalle Ruusunen, Veli-Matti Kaitala and Ruth Luoma-aho.

== Partial cast ==
- Kalle Ruusunen as Eero Merjanen
- Veli-Matti Kaitala as Martti Merjanen
- Ruth Luoma-aho as Marja Blomqvist
- Rauha Rentola as Vappu
- Doris Hovimaa as Carmen
- Aku Korhonen as Peter Blomqvist
- Uuno Laakso as Vippi-Julle
- Jalmari Rinne as Opera manager
- Heikki Aaltoila as Conductor
- Litja Ilmari as Stina Malm
- Kalle Viherpuu as Peltonen
- Matti Aulos as Heikkinen
- Pirkko Raitio as Mrs. Häkkinen
- Kaisu Leppänen as Raili Salmio
- Gunnar Calenius as Heinämaa
- Ossi Korhonen as Pawnbroker
- Joel Asikainen as Singer in restaurant
- Pentti Viljanen as Auctioneer
- Vili Järe as Stage manager
- Vilho Jauhiainen
- Tarmo Manni as Raili's companion

== Bibliography ==
- Tad Bentley Hammer. International film prizes: an encyclopedia. Garland, 1991.
