= Elina Pohjanpää =

Finnish actress (1933–1996)

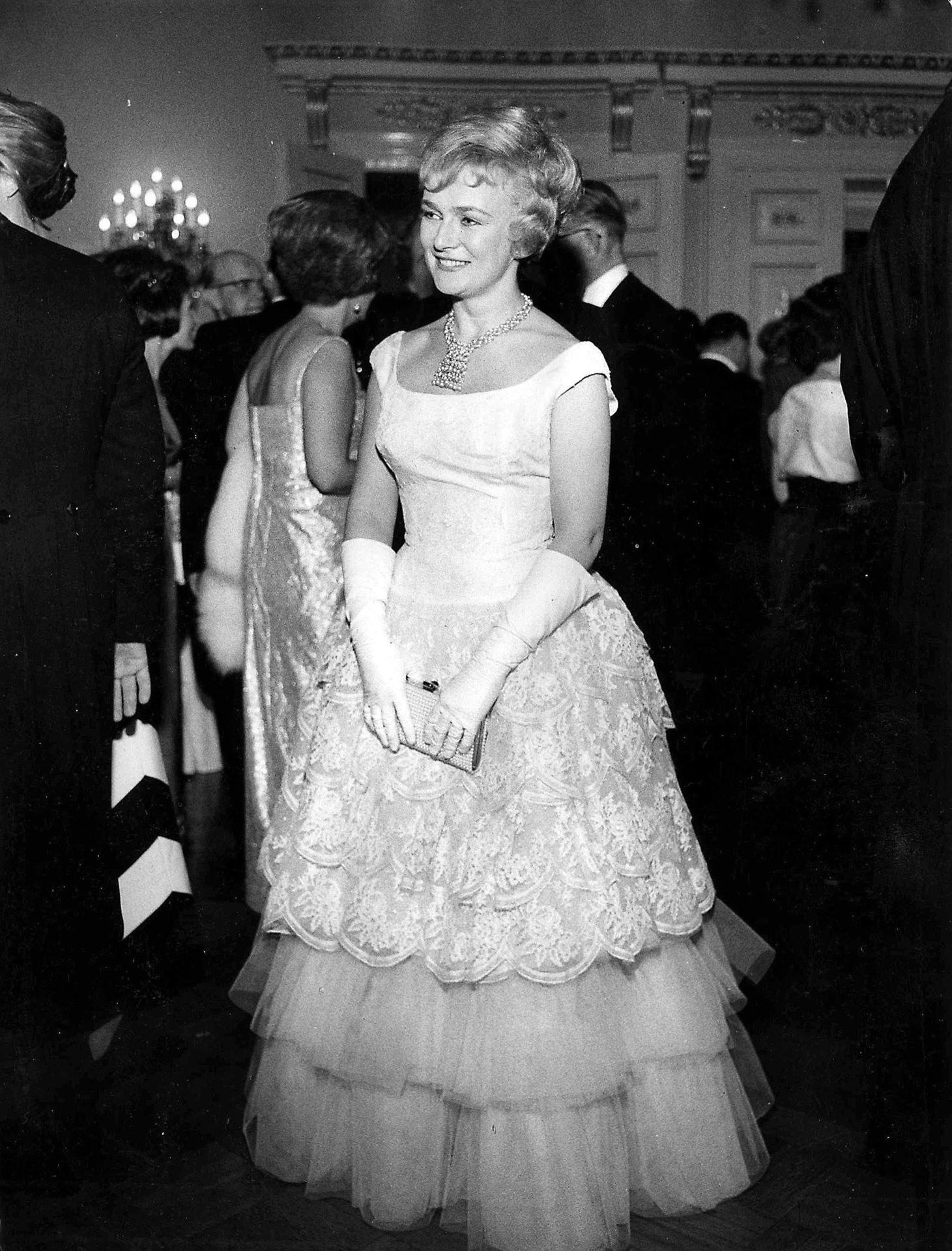
Pohjanpää at 1965 Independence Day reception

Armi Elina Annikki Pohjanpää (8 April 1933, in Helsinki – 13 January 1996) was a Finnish actress. Her theatrical career lasted for 40 years, and in addition, she appeared in several Finnish films by directors such as Ilmari Unho, Aarne Tarkas and Matti Kassila.

== In theatre ==
Pohjanpää's career started in a Kotka City Theatre in 1952 where she also met her future husband Pentti Siimes. The two got married in 1956, and their marriage lasted until Pohjanpää's death. After a year in Kotka, Pohjanpää started to work for Helsinki City Theatre where she stayed employed for the rest of her life.

== Films ==
Elina Pohjanpää was 17 years old when she made her first film appearance in a film Amor hoi! (1950). Her first leading role came a year later with Kuisma ja Helinä (1951). All in all, Pohjanpää appeared in 29 films. Often she and Pentti Siimes were seen together in films such as Tyttö lähtee kasarmiin (1956) and Rakas varkaani (1957). Their real-life wedding was seen in Rakas varkaani, which was also the only film in which they were seen as lovers.

== Selected filmography ==
- Amor hoi! (1950)
- Kuisma ja Helinä (1951)
- Mother or Woman (1953)
- Isän vanha ja uusi (1955)
- Villi Pohjola (1955)
- Juha (1956)
- Komisario Palmun erehdys (1960)
- Elokuva jalostavasta rakkaudesta (1967)
- Niskavuori (1984)
- Tie naisen sydämeen (1996)
