= Substitute Wife =

1936 film by Valentin Vaala

- Directed by: Valentin Vaala
- Written by: Tauno Tattari; Valentin Vaala; Hilja Valtonen (novel)
- Produced by: Risto Orko
- Starring: Ansa Ikonen; Tauno Palo; Uuno Laakso
- Cinematography: Theodor Luts
- Edited by: Valentin Vaala
- Music by: Harry Bergström
- Production company: Suomen Filmiteollisuus
- Distributed by: Suomen Filmiteollisuus
- Release date: 12 April 1936
- Running time: 82 minutes
- Country: Finland
- Language: Finnish

Substitute Wife (Finnish: Vaimoke) is a 1936 Finnish romantic comedy film directed by Valentin Vaala and starring Ansa Ikonen, Tauno Palo and Uuno Laakso.

== Cast ==
- Ansa Ikonen as Kirsti Leivo / Latva
- Tauno Palo as Esko Latva
- Uuno Laakso as Julle
- Kirsti Suonio as Sofia
- Kunto Karapää as Tanu Miettinen
- Sylvi Palo as Maija Pietarinen
- Väinö Sola as Parish clerk
- Ruth Snellman as Signe
- Aino Lohikoski as Liisa
- Sirpa Tolonen as Leena
- Rakel Linnanheimo as Maila
- Sointu Kouvo as Sirkka
- Eino Jurkka as Torvela
- Kaija Suonio as Dean's wife
- Erwin Uimonen as Hoffman
- Siiri Angerkoski as Mrs. Miettinen
- Matti Aulos as Porter
- Vilho Auvinen as Man in a train
- Arvo Kuusla as Man in a club
- Irja Kuusla as Maid
- Kyösti Käyhkö as Man in a train
- Liisa Nevalainen as Kirsti's guest
- Otto Noro as Man in a train
- Rosi Rinne as Housekeeper
- Pentti Saares as Man in a phone booth
- Margareta Wasenius as Kirsti's guest
- Elli Ylimaa as Spinster

== Bibliography ==
- Pietari Kääpä. Directory of World Cinema: Finland. Intellect Books, 2012.
