= The Girl from Moon Bridge =

1953 film

- Directed by: Matti Kassila
- Written by: Matti Kassila; Hella Wuolijoki
- Produced by: T.J. Särkkä
- Starring: Tyyne Haarla; Ansa Ikonen; Paavo Jännes
- Cinematography: Kalle Peronkoski
- Music by: Heikki Aaltoila
- Production company: Suomen Filmiteollisuus
- Distributed by: Suomen Filmiteollisuus
- Release date: 30 October 1953
- Country: Finland
- Language: Finnish

The Girl from Moon Bridge (Finnish: Tyttö kuunsillalta) is a 1953 Finnish drama film directed by Matti Kassila and starring Tyyne Haarla, Ansa Ikonen and Paavo Jännes.

== Cast ==
- Tyyne Haarla as Eva Boman
- Ansa Ikonen as Pepi Varala
- Paavo Jännes as Professor
- Kullervo Kalske as Mr. Puranen
- Arvo Lehesmaa as Prof. Anttila
- Kaisu Leppänen as Margit
- Kerstin Nylander as Flora Ramberg
- Ilmi Parkkari as Silja Varala
- Matti Ranin as Juhani Varala
- Sven Relander as Mr. Alvenius
- Joel Rinne as Erik Ramberg
- Eero Roine as Judge Lindman
- Kaarlo Saarnio as Dean
- Vilho Siivola as Erland Varala

== Bibliography ==
- Qvist, Per Olov & von Bagh, Peter. Guide to the Cinema of Sweden and Finland. Greenwood Publishing Group, 2000.
