= Mother or Woman =

1953 film by Ilmari Unho

- Directed by: Ilmari Unho
- Written by: Usko Kemppi; Hilja Kilpi (play)
- Produced by: Risto Orko
- Starring: Helena Futtari; Aku Korhonen; Elina Pohjanpää
- Cinematography: Erkki Imberg
- Edited by: Armas Laurinen
- Music by: Einari Marvia
- Production company: Suomen Filmiteollisuus
- Distributed by: Suomen Filmiteollisuus
- Release date: 4 September 1953
- Running time: 90 minutes
- Country: Finland
- Language: Finnish

Mother or Woman (Finnish: Sillankorvan emäntä) is a 1953 Finnish drama film directed by Ilmari Unho and starring Helena Futtari, Aku Korhonen and Elina Pohjanpää. The film was shot between June 29 and August 17, 1958, in Läyliäinen, the village of Loppi, and the place used was a Forsbacka farm.

== Cast ==
- Helena Futtari as Mailiisa Sillankorva
- Aku Korhonen as Eetu Savela
- Elina Pohjanpää as Johanna Sillankorva
- Helge Herala as Jaakko Halla
- Anni Aitto as Kreeta
- Eero Leväluoma as Tapani
- Salli Karuna as Anni Anttila
- Alli Häjänen as Elli Anttila
- Tommi Rinne as Sillankorva's farm hand
- Arvo Lehesmaa as Farmer of Halla
- Topo Leistelä as Dean
- Laina Laine as Gossip woman
- Rosi Rinne as Gossip woman
- Aino Lohikoski as Gossip woman
- Irja Elstelä as Gossip woman
- Uljas Kandolin as Janne, Johanna's father
- Heimo Lepistö as Village man

== Bibliography ==
- Qvist, Per Olov & von Bagh, Peter. Guide to the Cinema of Sweden and Finland. Greenwood Publishing Group, 2000.
