= Ture Junttu =

Finnish actor and director

Ture Junttu (28 April 1911 − 24 September 1981) was a Finnish actor and director. He appeared in films between 1938 and 1979.

== Selected filmography ==
- Woman is the Wild Card (1944)
- The Dead Man Loses His Temper (1944)
- Linnaisten vihreä kamari (1945)
- Kohtalo johtaa meitä (1945)
- Sadan miekan mies (1951)
- Poika eli kesäänsä (1955)
- Ei ruumiita makuuhuoneeseen (1959)
- Akseli and Elina (1970)
- Pohjantähti (1973)
