= Pehkonen =

Pehkonen is a Finnish surname. Notable people with the surname include:

- Eero Yrjö Pehkonen (1882–1949), Finnish politician
- Eila Pehkonen (1924–1991), Finnish actress
- Keijo Pehkonen (1964), Finnish wrestler
- Mari Pehkonen (born 1985), Finnish ice hockey player
