= Ihmiset suviyössä (film) =

- Directed by: Valentin Vaala
- Written by: Lea Joutseno, Usko Kemppi, Valentin Vaala
- Based on: Ihmiset suviyössä
- Produced by: Risto Orko
- Starring: Eila Pehkonen; Matti Oravisto; Martti Katajisto; Emma Väänänen; Eero Roine; Kaisu Leppänen
- Cinematography: Eino Heino
- Edited by: Valentin Vaala
- Music by: Taneli Kuusisto
- Production company: Suomi-Filmi
- Distributed by: Suomi-Filmi
- Release date: 9 October 1948
- Running time: 66 minutes
- Country: Finland
- Language: Finnish

Ihmiset suviyössä (People in the Summer Night) is a 1948 Finnish film directed by Valentin Vaala. It is based on Frans Eemil Sillanpää's 1934 novel of the same title.

The film stars Eila Pehkonen, Matti Oravisto, Martti Katajisto, Emma Väänänen, Eero Roine and Kaisu Leppänen.

== Plot ==
The film concentrates on the destinies of a small group of people during one summer night. All events in the film are told from two different perspectives. During the night people are falling in love, fighting drunk, dying, and being born.

Nature is just as important a part of the movie as the actors are. The novelist Sillanpää himself had told Vaala to keep in mind that there should be only one main character, and that is the summer night.

== Cast ==
- Eila Pehkonen as Telirannan Helka
- Martti Katajisto as Nokia
- Emma Väänänen as Syrjämäen Hilja
- Eero Roine as Syrjämäen Jalmari
- Matti Oravisto as Arvid
- Toivo Hämeranta as Telirannan isäntä
- Tyyne Haarla as Telirannan Martta-emäntä
- Maija Nuutinen as Telirannan vanhaemäntä
- Kaisu Leppänen as Mettälän Santra
- Matti Lehtelä as Mettälän Jukka
- Tarmo Manni as Iivari Pietilä

== Reception ==
Ihmiset suviyössä received mostly positive reviews from Finnish critics. They especially praised Eino Heino's cinematography, stating that such beautiful and sensitive capturing of Finnish nature had never before been seen in domestic films.

The film received four Jussi Awards; in addition to actors Martti Katajisto, Eero Roine and Kaisu Leppänen, also Valentin Vaala and Lea Joutseno were awarded for the screenplay.

== Commentary ==
The character Nokia is considered to be the first gay character in Finnish cinema.
