= Soot and Gold =

- Directed by: Edvin Laine
- Written by: Toivo Kauppinen; Olavi Veistäjä
- Produced by: T.J. Särkkä
- Starring: Edvin Laine; Ansa Ikonen; Veli-Matti Kaitala
- Cinematography: Felix Forsman
- Edited by: Armas Vallasvuo
- Music by: Heikki Aaltoila
- Production company: Suomen Filmiteollisuus
- Distributed by: Suomen Filmiteollisuus
- Release date: 21 October 1945
- Running time: 88 minutes
- Country: Finland
- Language: Finnish

Soot and Gold (Finnish: Nokea ja kultaa) is a 1945 Finnish drama film directed by Edvin Laine and starring Laine, Ansa Ikonen and Veli-Matti Kaitala.

== Partial cast ==
- Ansa Ikonen as Sirkka Lehmus
- Edvin Laine as Jalmari Aaltonen
- Veli-Matti Kaitala as Risto Muuranen
- Uuno Laakso as Ryyppy-Ville
- Thure Bahne as Klaus Vaheri
- Enni Rekola as Pirkit
- Matti Aulos as Eemeli Virta
- Arvi Tuomi as Major of the Salvation Army
- Rafael Pihlaja as Police inspector
- Jalmari Rinne as Siltanen
- Evald Terho as Ruotu-Roope
- Anni Rönkkö as Miina Laakso
- Aku Peltonen as Esa Laakso
- Vili Järe as Kemiläinen
- Pirkko Raitio as Matron in Pelastusrengas
- Einari Ketola as Sailor
- Juhani Turunen as Kallu
- Ritva-Leena as Liisa Lahtinen
- Yrjö Sylberg as Esa's friend
- Veikko Linna as Customs officer
- Rauha Puntti as Saleswoman
- Olavi Vepsäläinen
- Aarne Orri as Joose
- Edvin Ruotsalainen as Detective
- Ossi Korhonen as Huttunen
- Aarne Laine as Duty policeman
- Toivo Lahti as Man in Pelastusrengas

== Bibliography ==
- John Holmstrom. The moving picture boy: an international encyclopaedia from 1895 to 1995. Michael Russell, 1996.
