= Tirlittan =

1953 children's book by Oiva Paloheimo

- Author: Oiva Paloheimo
- Original title: Finnish: Tirlittan – Orpotyttö Ihmisten Ihmemaassa
- Illustrator: Rolf Sandqvist
- Language: Finnish
- Genre: Children's literature
- Publisher: WSOY
- Publication date: 1953
- Publication place: Finland
- Pages: 117
- ISBN: 951-0-04113-0
- OCLC: 37030301

Tirlittan (Finnish: Tirlittan – Orpotyttö Ihmisten Ihmemaassa) is a Finnish children's book from 1953 by Oiva Paloheimo. It’s the story of a little girl named Tirlittan who ends up separated from her family after a thunderstorm destroys their home and takes the family past, leading Tirlittan with an ocarina to embark on an eventful quest to find her parents and siblings. The author himself had been an orphan as a child and dealt with the theme of orphanhood in several of his works.

The book is considered to be the most well-known work of Paloheimo's literary production. Based on the book, several theater plays, a film and television adaptations have been made. However, the film adaptation Tweet, Tweet directed by Maunu Kurkvaara in 1958 was poorly received, and the author was not satisfied with the result either.

Since 1993, the Union of Finnish Writers has awarded the Tirlittan Prize, named after the work, to Finnish-language children's and young people's literature.
