= Hilkka Kinnunen =

Finnish actress (1925–2026)

- Kinnunen and her future husband in 1946
- Born: Hilkka Terttu Annikki Kinnunen; 19 March 1925; Viipuri, Finland
- Died: 19 October 2026 (aged 101); Helsinki, Finland
- Occupations: Actress; Operetta singer; Stage director; Theatre director
- Organizations: Operettiteatteri
- Title: Teatterineuvos
- Spouse: Ekke Hämäläinen (m. 1948; div. 1971)
- Children: 2

Hilkka Terttu Annikki Kinnunen (19 March 1925 – 19 October 2026) was a Finnish actress, operetta singer, stage director and theatre director. She appeared in musical theatre, dramas, on radio and in film. She founded the Operettiteatteri in Helsinki, focused on operettas, in 1959 and led it until 1996, often taking lead roles and directing. The title role of Lehár's The Gypsy Princess became her signature role. She took the company on tours to Sweden, the United States and Canada.

== Life and career ==
Kinnunen was born in Viipuri on 19 March 1925. Her mother, Hilja Puustinen, ran a fabric and clothing shop in Vyborg, and her father, Heikki Kinnunen, worked for the State Railways; she was their only child. She had ballet lessons from age four, and her mother enrolled her at the local music school at age six, where she learned to play the violin for six years.

Her family moved to Helsinki during World War II. Relatives of her mother heard her singing and encouraged her to pursue a career as a performer. She began taking voice lessons with Pia Ravenna, studied music at the Music Academy and trained diction with Helinä Svensson-Timari. She was accepted to the Suomen Teatterikoulu, the Finnish theatre school, when it opened in 1943. During her studies, she performed at the Äänislinna War Theatre and appeared on Aunus Radio in the spring of 1944.

=== Performer ===
After graduation, Kinnunen became a member of the Workers' Theatre. She played three lead roles in the open-air Vallila theatre. In August 1945, she had a great success in the title role of Kálmán's operetta The Circus Princess, followed by her breakthrough that autumn, portraying Sylva Varescu in Lehár's The Gypsy Princess. Reviewers noted her "pure and expressive soprano" and her "confidence and elegance". It became a signature role.

In 1946, she became engaged to Ekke Hämäläinen, whom she had met at drama school. They both became members of the Kansanteatteri (Peoples' Theatre) in 1947. Besides musical theatre, she performed drama there in plays by Shakespeare and Strindberg, with partners on stage such as Elsa Turakainen, Edvin Laine, and Leo Lähteenmäki.

Kinnunen also performed in radio plays and music programs, often with Ture Ara and accompanied by the Radio Entertainment Orchestra conducted by George de Godzinsky. In the 1950s, regarded as the golden age of Finnish cinema, she played in films directed by Valentin Vaala and Matti Kassila, such as April's Coming in 1953. She also appeared in television entertainment in the 1960s.

In 1947, Kinnunen studied voice in Rome with Manlio Marcantoni for around a month, supported by a scholarship from the Leo and Regina Wainstein Foundation. On a government grant, she studied directing and singing at the Vienna Academy of Music from 1954 to 1955. She studied directing further in 1972 with Walter Felsenstein at the Komische Oper Berlin.

When Walter Firner was a guest director from Vienna at the Kansanteatteri in 1955 for the comedy Father Camillo and Peppone, she was his interpreter and assistant. She was then offered to direct and play the lead role in Victoria and Her Hussar in 1956, but focused on directing for production. It was regarded as "inventive and fast-paced". She then often both directed and played, including The Gypsy Princess in 1956 and Countess Maritza in 1959.

=== Theatre director ===
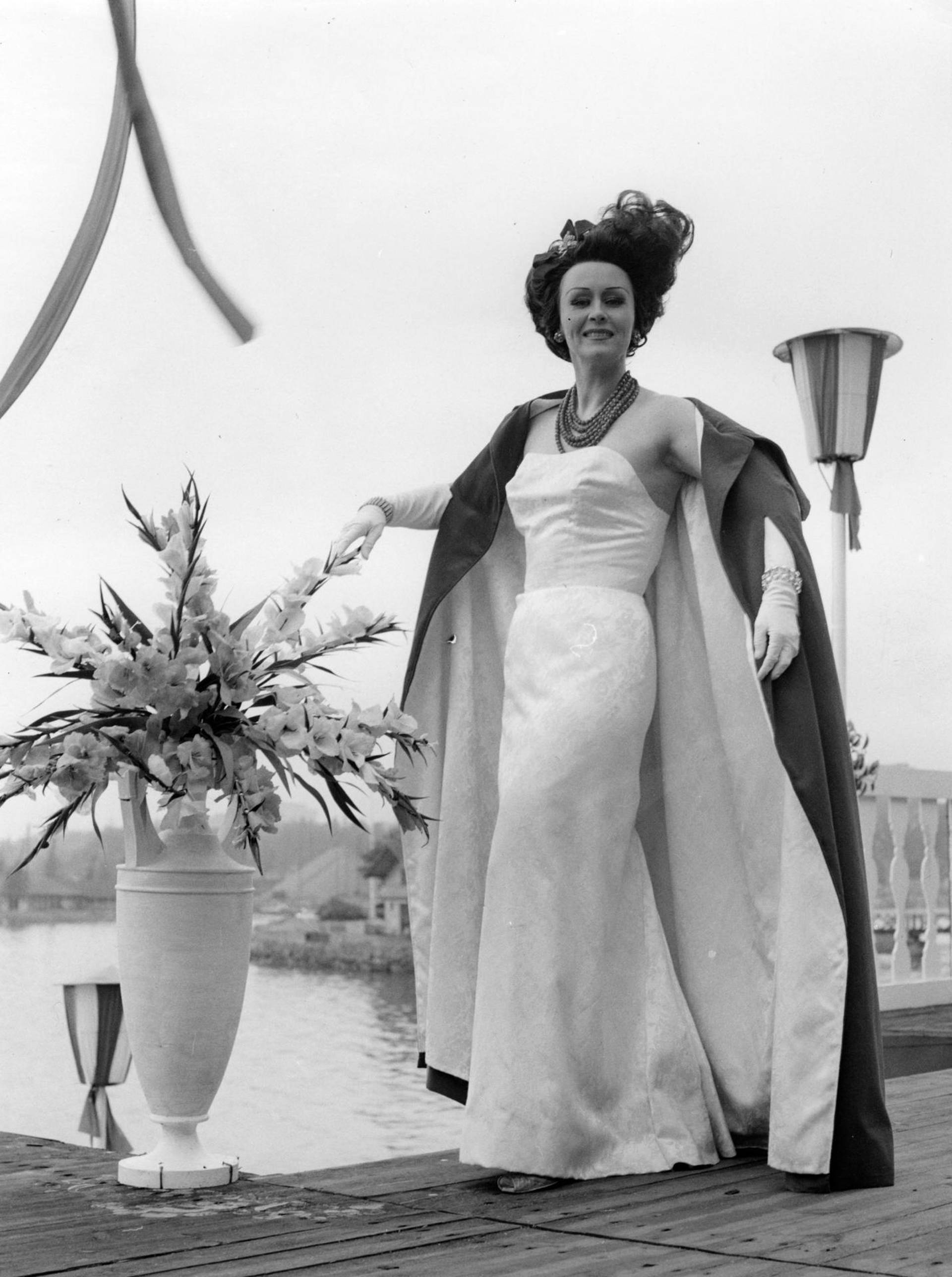
Kinnunen as Countess Maritza, 1962

Kinnunen founded the Operettiteatteri, focused on operettas, in 1959 and led it until 1996, often taking lead roles. The first production was the musical Guys and Dolls at the Kulttuuritalo, a new theatre designed by Alvar Aalto with a hall seating more than 1,500 people. Her company could rent rehearsal and office space in the building. She invited popular entertainers to perform, such as Georg Ots in Lehár's The Merry Widow. Performers included Tapani Kansa, Katri Helena, Lasse Mårtenson, Anneli Sari and Virpi Miettinen, conductor Mikko von Deringer, and choreographer Elsa Sylvestersson.

They toured Finland's large cities, and from the 1970s also abroad. The first production to tour nine towns in Sweden was The Countess Mariza in 1973, followed in 1974 by tours of the United States and Canada with The Gypsy Princess. They toured to cities with Finnish immigrants until the end of the 1970s. She also toured in concerts to the United States, Canada and Australia until the 1990s. She was regarded as the prima donna of operetta in Finland.

=== Personal life ===
From 1948 to 1971, Kinnunen was married to actor Ekke Hämäläinen; they had two children, and their son Vesa Hämes became an actor. From 1976 to 1979, Kinnunen was married to the businessman Bill Farrell.

Kinnunen turned 100 on 19 March 2025, and died in Helsinki on 19 October 2026, at the age of 101.

== Legacy and awards ==
On the occasion of her 80th birthday in 2005, Aino Kukkonen published the book Hilkka Kinnunen ― Primadonna, about her life. The story of her youth was told in Lotta-Sofia Saahko's book Kahvia ja karjalanpiirakoita, published in 2021.

In 2010, President Tarja Halonen awarded her the title of teatterineuvos (Theatre Counsellor) for her achievements for the benefit of Finnish musical theatre. The same year, she received the Grand Cross of the Polish Order of Polonia Restituta and became Commander of the Order of Finnish Performing Arts.

== Filmography ==
- Toukokuun taika (1948) – Inga Adlerfeldt
- Vihaan sinua – rakas (1951) – Miss Laaksola
- The Apple Falls (1952) – Susan
- Maailman kaunein tyttö (1953) – Teacher
- Song of Warsaw (1953) – Perämies Koskisen vaimo
- April's Coming (1953) – Annikki Teräs
- Yhteinen vaimomme (1956) – Rouva
- Syntipukki (1957) – Mrs. Beck
- Jouluvene – tähtiparaati (1964)
