= Let Not One Devil Cross the Bridge =

- Original Finnish film poster
- Directed by: Matti Kassila
- Written by: Matti Kassila; Kari Kyrönseppä
- Produced by: Maunu Kurkvaara
- Starring: Maija Karhi; Pentti Siimes; Helge Herala; Toivo Mäkelä
- Cinematography: Raimo Hartzell
- Edited by: Allan Wallenius
- Music by: Esko Linnavalli
- Release date: 2 February 1968
- Running time: 99 minutes
- Country: Finland
- Language: Finnish

Let Not One Devil Cross the Bridge (Finnish: Äl’ yli päästä perhanaa) is a 1968 Finnish anthology comedy film directed by Matti Kassila. The film is an ensemble divided into three independent stories, based on the ideas of the actual frame story, where the people who took part in the film design meeting during the get-together held at evening. The film stars Maija Karhi, Pentti Siimes, Helge Herala and Toivo Mäkelä.

Director Kassila returned to film directing after a five-year hiatus. The film was completed at a time when Finnish television had begun to take audiences away from cinemas, which is why Kassila wanted to use this film to comment on the crisis in the Finnish film industry.

The film's audience success was the weakest in 1968, even though it was effectively marketed, and it made big losses, making it the box-office bomb. In the television show Kinoklubi, where directors Matti Kassila and Markku Pölönen and producer Markus Selin listed their own failed films and the reasons for the failure, Kassila considered Let Not One Devil Cross the Bridge to be one of his worst films ever made.

== See also ==
- Kummeli: Stories
