= Aunus =

Aunus may refer to:

- Aunus, Finnish for
  - Olonets, a town and district in Karelia
  - Olonets Karelia, a region
- 1480 Aunus, an asteroid
- Aunus expedition, a military conflict in 1919
- Aunus Group, a Finnish military formation 1942-1944
- Aunus Radio, a radio station 1941-1944
