= Tauno Söder =

Finnish actor

- Born: 13 January 1927; Sakkola, Finland
- Died: 2 May 2009 (aged 82)
- Occupation: Actor
- Years active: 1954 - 1979

Tauno Söder (13 January 1927 – 2 May 2009) was a Finnish actor. He appeared in 99 films and television shows between 1954 and 1979. He starred in the film Yksityisalue, which was entered into the 13th Berlin International Film Festival.

== Selected filmography ==
- The Scarlet Dove (1961)
- Yksityisalue (1962)
- Oppenheimerin tapaus (1967)
