= Eila Pehkonen =

Finnish actress (1924–1991)

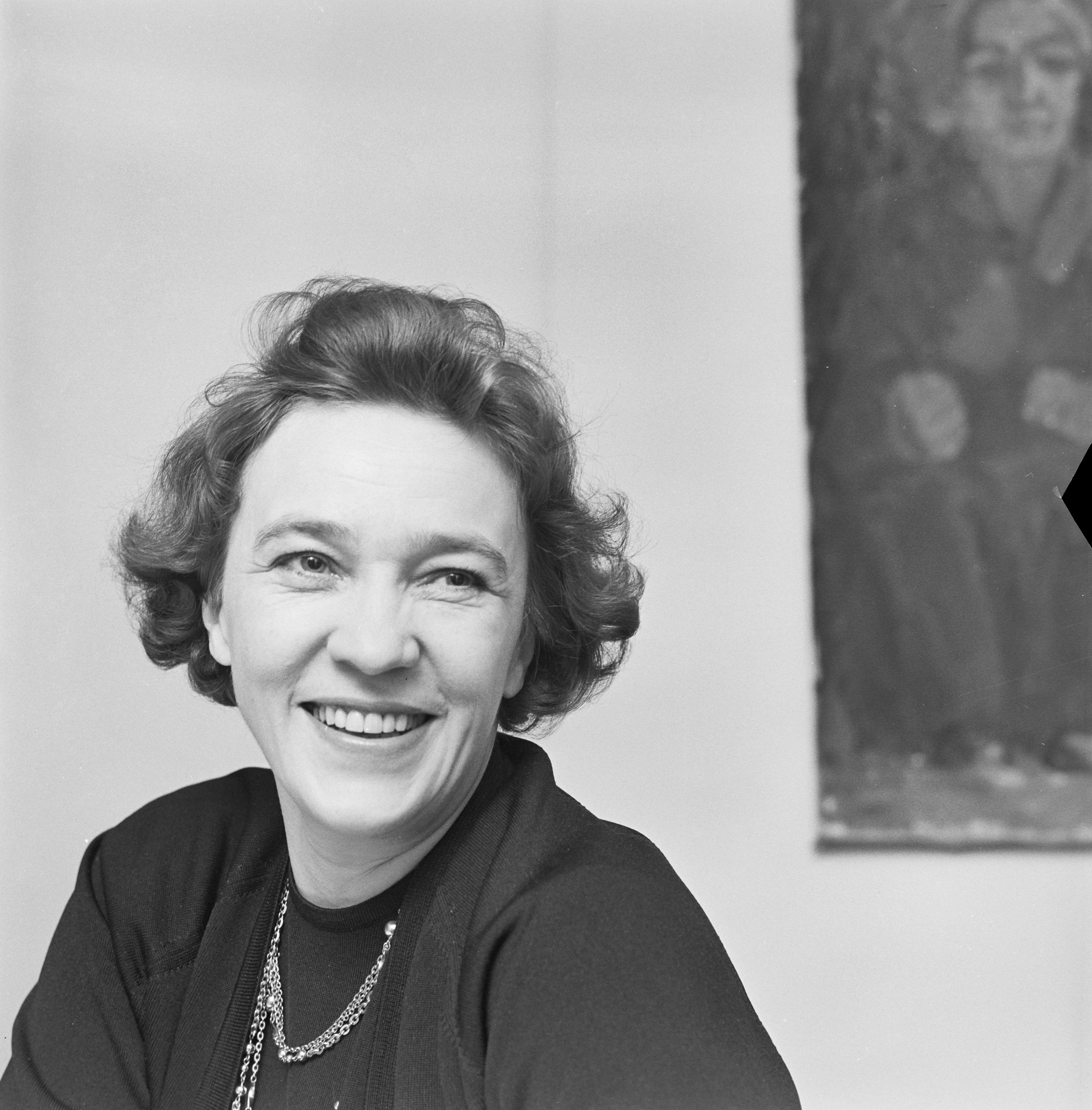
Pehkonen in 1969

Eila Mirjam Pehkonen (since 1948 Kostermaa, 18 October 1924 – 10 September 1991) was a Finnish actress.

== In theatre and films ==
Pehkonen was born into a family of five children. She was interested in acting and theatre since childhood, and in 1945, Pehkonen began her studies at the Helsinki Theatre Academy, graduating in 1947. During her career, she worked for several Finnish theatres. Among her colleagues in theatre, she was known as "Pehkis".

Pehkonen's film career started with two memorable roles in films directed by Valentin Vaala; the title character in Maaret – tunturien tyttö (1947) and the female lead role in Ihmiset suviyössä (1948).

== Private life ==
Since 1948, Pehkonen was married to actor and opera director Yrjö Kostermaa (1921–1997). Together they had two children.

== Selected filmography ==
- Maaret – tunturien tyttö (1947)
- Ihmiset suviyössä (1948)
- Villi Pohjola (1955)
- Rintamalotta (1956)
- Juha (1956)
- Punainen viiva (1959)
- Lumisten metsien tyttö (1960)
- Kultainen vasikka (1961)
- Pikku Pietarin piha (1961)
- Tulipunainen kyyhkynen (1961)
- Ruusujen aika (1969)
- Leikkikalugangsteri (1969)
- Sixtynine – 69 (1969)
- Aika hyvä ihmiseksi (1977)
- Niskavuori (1984)
- Uuno Epsanjassa (1985)
- Uunon huikeat poikamiesvuodet maaseudulla (1990)
- Vääpeli Körmy ja marsalkan sauva (1990)
