= Lohikoski (surname) =

Lohikoski is a Finnish surname. Notable people with the surname include:

- Aino Lohikoski (1898–1981), Finnish actress
- Armand Lohikoski (1912–2005), Finnish film director and writer
- Pia Lohikoski, Finnish politician
