= Gabriel, Come Back =

- Finnish: Gabriel, tule takaisin
- Directed by: Valentin Vaala
- Written by: Valentin Vaala
- Based on: Gabriel, tule takaisin by Mika Waltari
- Produced by: Risto Orko
- Starring: Tarmo Manni; Emma Väänänen; Salli Karuna
- Cinematography: Eino Heino
- Edited by: Valentin Vaala
- Music by: George de Godzinsky
- Production company: Suomi-Filmi
- Distributed by: Suomi-Filmi
- Release date: 26 January 1951
- Running time: 80 minutes
- Country: Finland
- Language: Finnish

Gabriel, Come Back (Finnish: Gabriel, tule takaisin) is a 1951 Finnish comedy film directed by Valentin Vaala and starring Tarmo Manni, Emma Väänänen and Salli Karuna. It is based on the play Gabriel, tule takaisin by Mika Waltari.

== Cast ==
- Tarmo Manni as Gabriel Vihervuori
- Emma Väänänen as Kristina Anger
- Salli Karuna as Ulrika Anger
- Ansa Ikonen as Rosa Pakkala
- Ilmi Parkkari as Raili
- Sakari Jurkka as Eero
- Holger Blommila
- Kaarlo Halttunen
- Kaisu Hele
- Maire Hyvönen
- Yrjö Ikonen
- Sinikka Ilmén
- Varma Lahtinen
- Aurora Lindström
- Uolevi Lönnberg
- Erkki Pellinen
- Rafael Pihlaja
- Pirkko Raitio
- Sylva Rossi
- Kalle Rouni
- Sirkka Sipilä
- Anton Soini
- Annie Sundman
- Olga Tainio
- Onni Timonen
- Satu Unho
- Elli Ylimaa

== Bibliography ==
- Pietari Kääpä. Directory of World Cinema: Finland. Intellect Books, 2012.
