= Helge Herala =

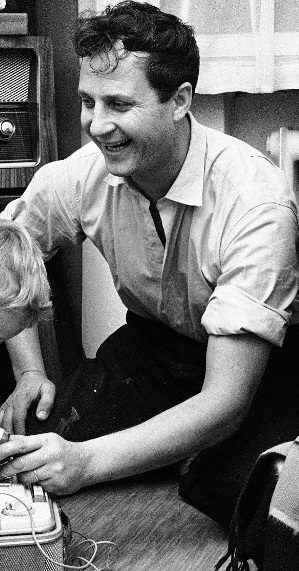
Herala in 1958

Helge Frans Birger ”Heguli” Herala (30 September 1922 − 27 February 2010) was a Finnish theatre and film actor. He appeared in several films and was also known for his popular television appearances.

== Selected filmography ==
- Hallin Janne (1950)
- Noita palaa elämään (1952)
- Mother or Woman (1953)
- 1918 – mies ja hänen omatuntonsa (1957)
- Kultainen vasikka (1961)
- Tähdet kertovat, komisario Palmu (1962)
- Oppenheimerin tapaus (1967)
- Täällä Pohjantähden alla (1968)
- Äl’ yli päästä perhanaa (1968)
- Akseli and Elina (1970)
- Aika hyvä ihmiseksi (1977)
- Pölhölä (1981)
- Uuno Turhapuro muuttaa maalle (1986)
- Raid (2003)
- Uuno Turhapuro – This Is My Life (2004)
