= Sylvi Palo =

Finnish actress

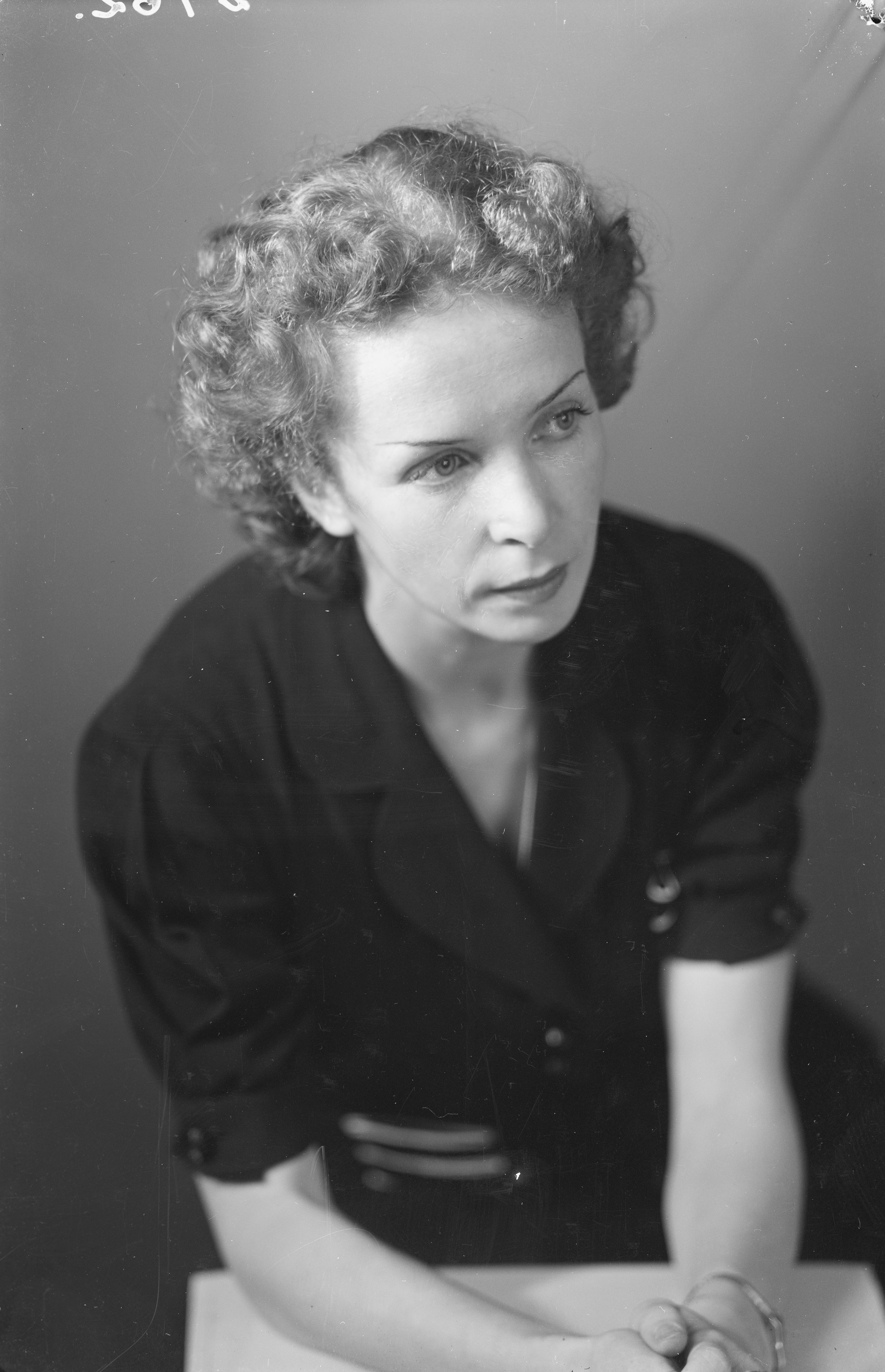
- Born: 26 March 1911; Myllykoski, Grand Duchy of Finland
- Died: 25 May 1987 (aged 76); Helsinki, Finland
- Occupation: Actress
- Years active: 1936-1952 (film)

Sylvi Palo (1911–1987) was a Finnish stage and film actress.

== Selected filmography ==
- Substitute Wife (1936)
- The Song of the Scarlet Flower (1938)

== Bibliography ==
- Laura Gröndahl. Experiences in Theatrical Spaces: Five Scenographies of Miss Julie. University of Art and Design Helsinki, 2004.
