= April's Coming =

- Finnish: Huhtikuu tulee
- Directed by: Valentin Vaala
- Screenplay by: Usko Kemppi; Valentin Vaala
- Based on: Huhtikuu tulee by Mika Waltari
- Produced by: Risto Orko
- Starring: Ossi Elstelä; Tuija Halonen; Kurt Ingvall
- Cinematography: Eino Heino
- Edited by: Valentin Vaala
- Music by: Usko Kemppi
- Production company: Suomen Filmiteollisuus
- Distributed by: Suomen Filmiteollisuus
- Release date: 28 April 1953
- Running time: 80 minutes
- Country: Finland
- Language: Finnish

April's Coming (Finnish: Huhtikuu tulee) is a 1953 Finnish comedy film directed by Valentin Vaala and starring Ossi Elstelä, Tuija Halonen and Kurt Ingvall. It is based on the play Huhtikuu tulee by Mika Waltari.

== Cast ==
- Ossi Elstelä as Subeditor
- Tuija Halonen as Journalist
- Kurt Ingvall as Jaakko Huhtikuu
- Hilkka Kinnunen as Annikki Teräs
- Rauno Kuosmanen as Pertti Avovirta
- Harry Lewing as Jopi
- Tarmo Manni as Kiuru - artist
- Kerstin Nylander
- Rauha Rentola as Elisabet Avovirta
- Joel Rinne as Heikki Avovirta
- Anja Räsänen as Kaija Avovirta
- Emma Väänänen
- Mika Waltari as Man in a restaurant

== Bibliography ==
- Qvist, Per Olov & von Bagh, Peter. Guide to the Cinema of Sweden and Finland. Greenwood Publishing Group, 2000.
