= Aku Korhonen =

Finnish actor

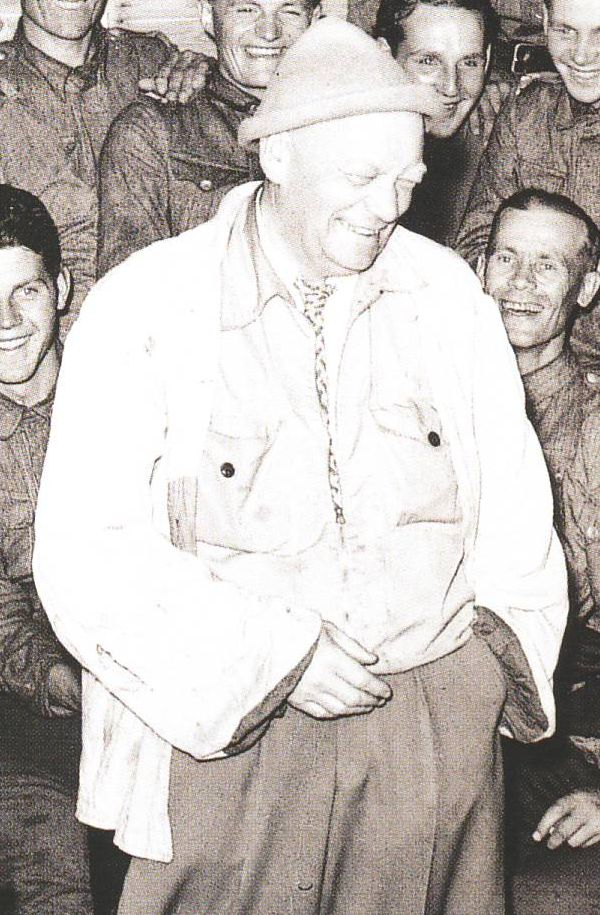
Korhonen in 1941

August ”Aku” Aleksander Korhonen (29 December 1892 in Käkisalmi − 5 September 1960 in Helsinki) was a Finnish theatre and film actor. During his career, he appeared in 76 films and received three Jussi Awards.

He is buried in the Hietaniemi Cemetery in Helsinki.

== Selected filmography ==
- Suursalon häät (1924)
- Lapatossu (1937)
- Valkoiset ruusut (1943)
- Woman is the Wild Card (1944)
- Light Melody (1946)
- North Express (1947)
- Neljä rakkautta (1951)
- Noita palaa elämään (1952)
- Mother or Woman (1953)
- Morsiusseppele (1954)
- Helunan häämatka (1955)
- Silja – nuorena nukkunut (1956)
