= Simo Puupponen =

Finnish novelist and journalist (1915–1967)

Simo Puupponen

Simo Tapio Puupponen (23 October 1915 – 11 October 1967), better known by the pen name Aapeli, was a Finnish journalist and novelist.

Aapeli was born in Kuopio, and became a journalist for the Pohjois-Savo and Savon Sanomat newspapers. In 1959, Aapeli won the Eino Leino Prize and the State literature prize.

He died, aged 51, in Helsinki. His novels were turned into films and plays in the 1970s. In 1977, his historical novels of the Aika hyvä ihmiseksi series were made into a feature film, People Not as Bad as They Seem.

== See also ==
- List of Finnish writers
- List of historical novelists
- Lists of journalists
