= Aunus Radio =

Finnish army radio station

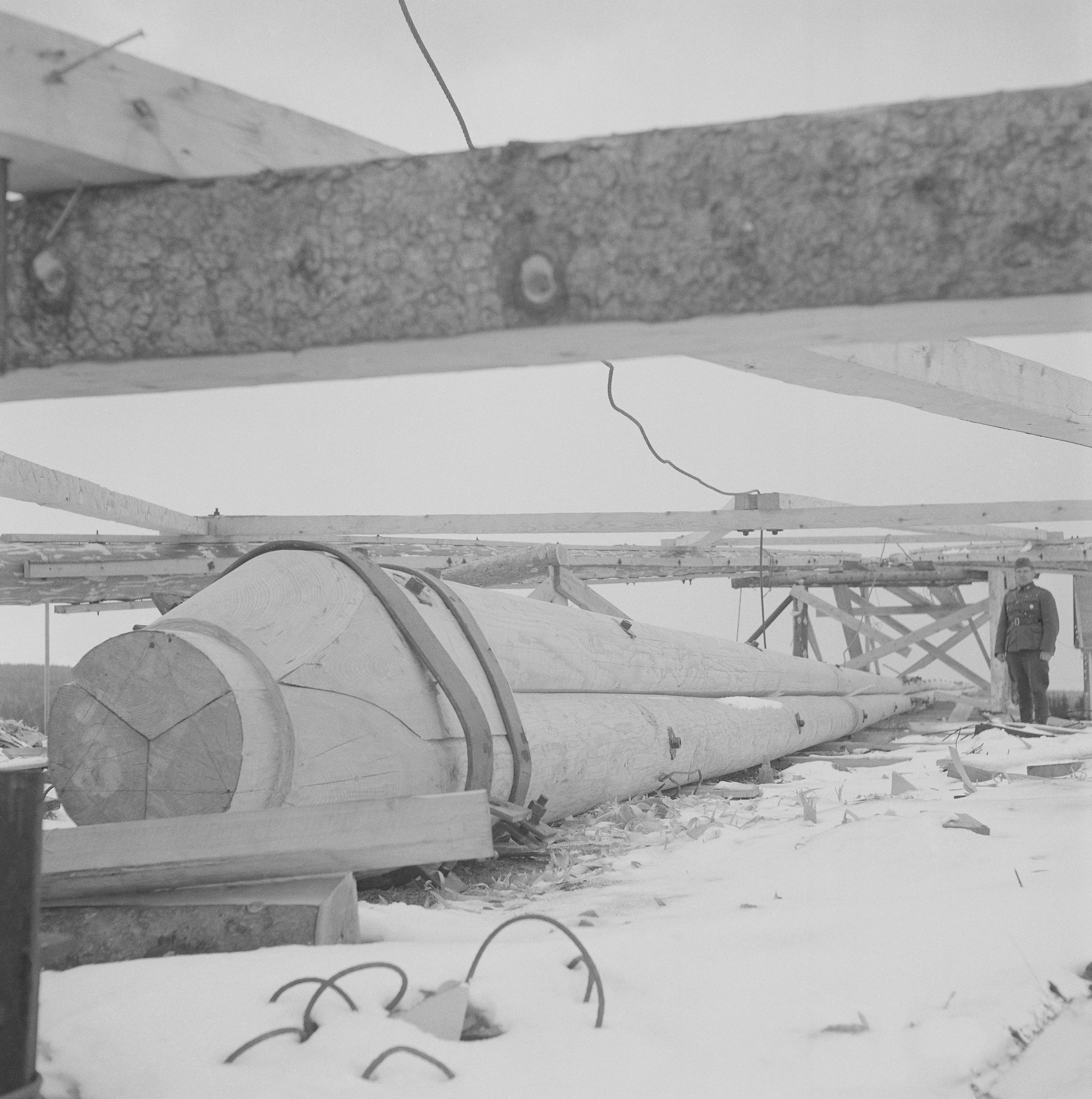
Wooden, 60 metre tall radio mast being erected in May 1942.

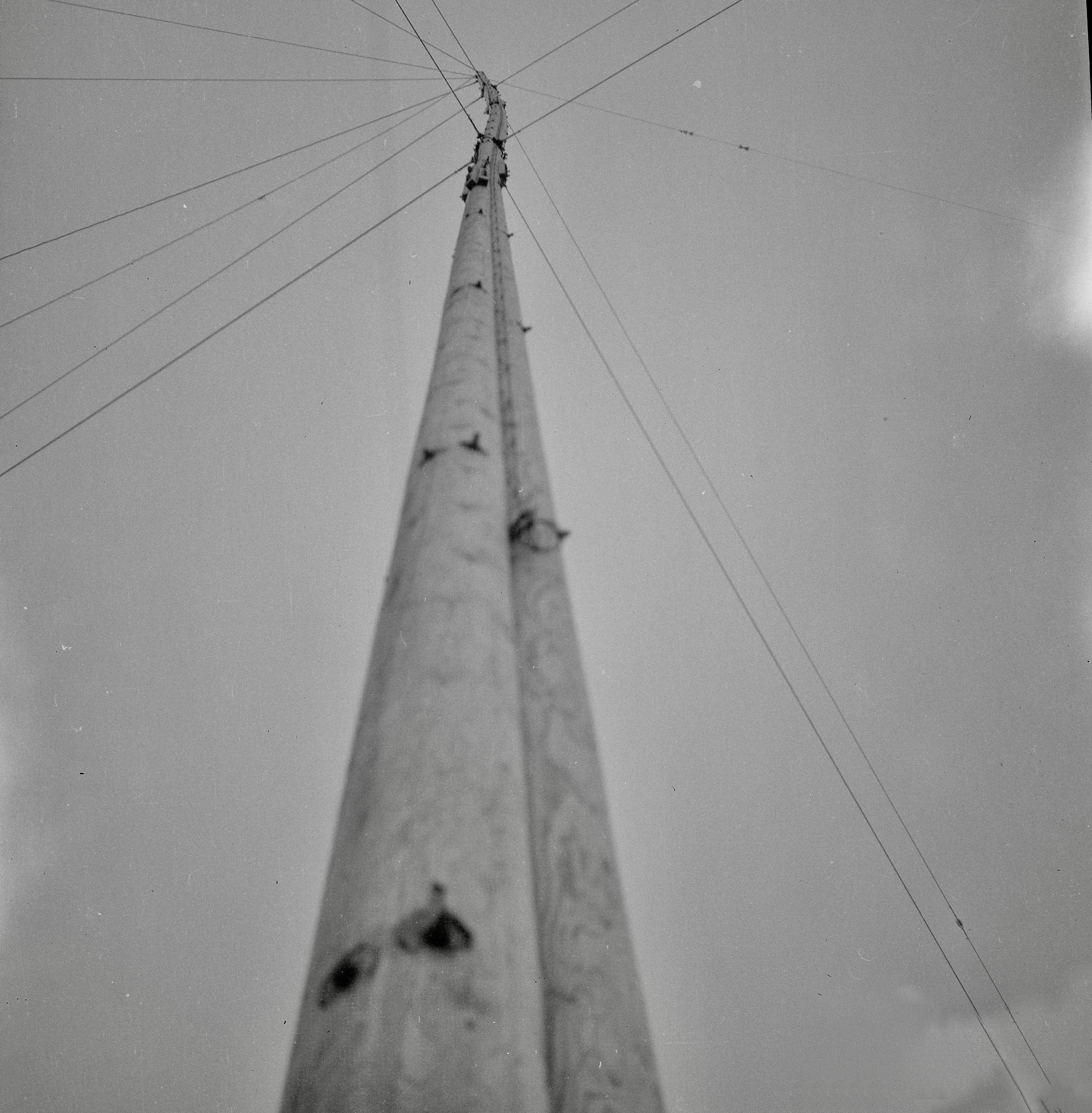
Same mast standing at Äänislinna in 1944.

Aunus Radio was a Finnish radio station operating in an area held by Finland in East Karelia during the Continuation War.

== Formation ==
Finnish military command was aware of the significant impact radio had on the troops in the front. However, near the eastern border it was impossible to listen to Finnish radio broadcasts due to the distance from the transmitters, and because of Soviet radio jamming. In summer 1941 it was decided that the Army of Karelia should have a radio station of its own.

The meeting in which Aunus Radio was formed was held on 18 August 1941, in Leppäsyrjä. The newly founded radio station was issued a car and a typewriter. One week later news were circulated about the formation of a new radio station, but due to difficulties with arrangements the opening ceremonies were not held until 1 September 1941, in Vieljärvi. At first, the station only broadcast on Sundays, and the programme was very modest. Yle, the Finnish national broadcasting company, donated 20 records to the new station. When both sides of the records had been played, the station usually broadcast a couple of hours of music.

== After startup ==
Soon after being formed Aunus Radio started inviting local talents to host shows. This often meant Finnish soldiers who were singers, humourists or "seers". In addition to music, the radio started broadcasting humour and plays. Some speeches were broadcast as well, but these were intentionally kept short to meet the wishes of the front line soldiers. At this time, the station started broadcasting daily up to 15 hours per day, including reports from the front and behind the lines. Overall the programming was aimed at entertaining the troops, with no artistic agenda. Since the station was also intended for the general populace of East Karelia, some of the programs were also broadcast in Vepsian and Karelian. Once Finnish troops conquered Petrozavodsk and renamed it Äänislinna, Aunus Radio moved there.

== Trench warfare ==
When the war changed into trench warfare, Aunus radio started broadcasting propaganda intended for Soviet troops. The number of staff also increased, and by 1942 the station employed 21 people, including nationally famous singer and actor Tauno Palo and writer Oiva Paloheimo. During the trench warfare Finnish troops were suffering from homesickness, and Aunus Radio successfully relieved this by broadcasting entertainment and information. However, their attempts at propaganda and multi-lingual broadcasts in Vepsian and Karelian were not successful in reaching the target audiences.

== End of the station ==
On 16 June 1944 a secret order was issued to the troops in East Karelia to withdraw. Aunus Radio withdrew from Äänislinna with them and settled near Sortavala. However, the station was bombed and the front line came closer, so it was transferred inside the current borders and ended its operations in September 1944.

== Sources ==
- Valitut Palat (1991). Tuntematon sota. Oy Valitut Palat. ISBN 951-8933-34-0.
