= Asser Fagerström =

Finnish actor and composer (1912–1990)

- Born: 27 July 1912; Helsinki, Grand Duchy of Finland
- Died: 6 October 1990 (aged 78); Helsinki, Finland

Asser Fagerström (27 July 1912 - 6 October 1990) was a Finnish pianist, composer and actor.

== Biography ==
Fagerström was born in Helsinki. He studied music and appeared in a number of jazz bands in Finland before taking up acting and first appeared in film in 1935. He made a number of appearances in Finnish film between then and the 1980s always appearing as a pianist or organist in films such as the Rauni Mollberg historical film Aika hyvä ihmiseksi in 1977 to which he also composed the soundtrack.

In the 1950s he released a number of albums.

He died in Helsinki in 1990.
