= Aino-Maija Tikkanen =

Finnish actress

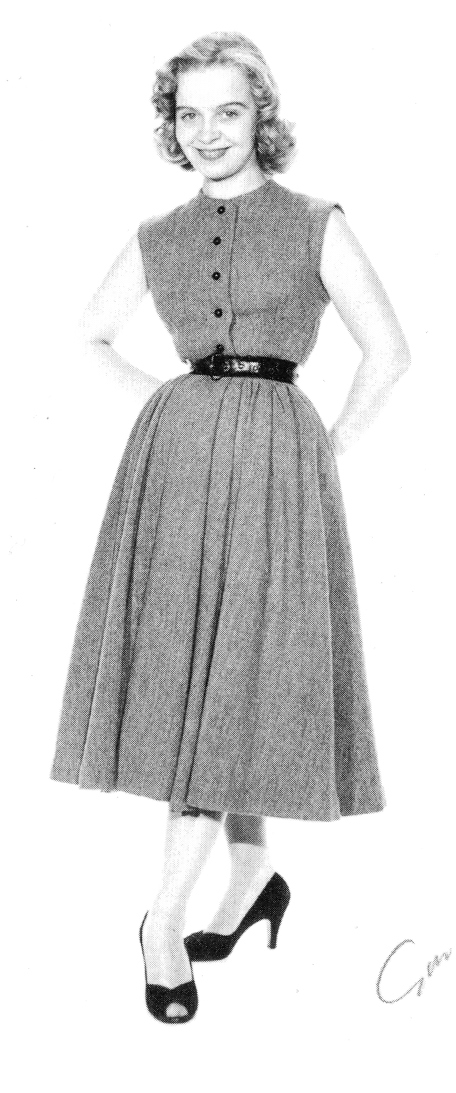
- Born: 2 November 1927; Turku, Finland
- Died: 3 March 2014 (aged 86); Helsinki, Finland
- Occupation: Actress
- Years active: 1954–2010

Aino-Maija Tikkanen (2 November 1927 – 3 March 2014) was a Finnish film actress. She appeared in 15 films between 1954 and 2010 and had a long career at theatre. She died on 3 March 2014 at the age of 86.

== Selected filmography ==
- Villi Pohjola (1955)
- Evakko (1956)
- The Harvest Month (1956)
- Äideistä parhain (2005)
