= Oppenheimerin tapaus =

- Based on: In the Matter of J. Robert Oppenheimer by Heinar Kipphardt
- Written by: Jouko Turkka
- Directed by: Timo Bergholm
- Starring: Matti Oravisto; Tauno Söder; Toivo Mäkelä
- Country of origin: Finland
- Original language: Finnish

Production
- Cinematography: Simo Helander
- Running time: 87 minutes

Original release
- Network: Yleisradio
- Release: 11 October 1967

Oppenheimerin tapaus (literally The Case of Oppenheimer) is a 1967 Finnish television drama film directed by Timo Bergholm. Based on the 1964 play In the Matter of J. Robert Oppenheimer by Heinar Kipphardt, the film takes place at the Atomic Energy Commission's (AEC) Oppenheimer security hearing. In the film, J. Robert Oppenheimer is played by Matti Oravisto.

== Cast ==
- Matti Oravisto as J. Robert Oppenheimer
- Tauno Söder as Gordon Gray
- Toivo Mäkelä as Ward V. Evans
- Yrjö Ikonen as Thomas A. Morgan
- Matti Ranin as Roger Robb
- Rauno Ketonen as Arthur Rolander
- Yrjö Järvinen as Herbert S. Marks
- Helge Herala as Boris Pash
- Olavi Ahonen as John Lansdale Jr.
- Sakari Jurkka as Edward Teller
- Leo Riuttu as Hans Bethe
- Kaarlo Halttunen as Isidor Isaac Rabi
- Kauko Kokkonen as the narrator

== See also ==
- Oppenheimer security hearing
- Oppenheimer (film)
