= Woman is the Wild Card =

Nainen on valttia
- Directed by: Ansa Ikonen
- Written by: Mika Waltari
- Produced by: T. J. Särkkä
- Starring: Ansa Ikonen; Aku Korhonen; Uuno Laakso; Unto Salminen
- Cinematography: Armas Hirvonen
- Edited by: Armas Vallasvuo
- Music by: Heikki Aaltoila
- Production company: Suomen Filmiteollisuus SF Oy
- Release date: 13 August 1944
- Running time: 99 minutes
- Country: Finland
- Language: Finnish

Nainen on valttia (Woman is the Wild Card) is a 1944 Finnish black-and-white comedy film directed by Ansa Ikonen. It was Ikonen's only directorial effort. The film is based on an original screenplay by Mika Waltari, revolving around a young woman who transforms the lives of three bachelors upon arriving at their home. The woman, a fugitive from the police, is revealed to be a famous operetta star named Kirsti Kalpa. She manages to conceal her identity—at least temporarily.

Despite being filmed in the midst of the Continuation War, the film does not reflect the war but instead presents a lighthearted comedy. The five-month production took place mainly indoors.

The project was offered to Ikonen by T. J. Särkkä, but she initially doubted her abilities, fearing male actors might not accept a female director. Ikonen received technical assistance from cinematographer Armas Hirvonen. While contemporary reviews noted issues with Waltari's script, Ikonen's direction was seen as skilled.

== Plot ==
Baron Heimonheimo (Ture Junttu) demands that his fiancée, Kirsti Kalpa (Ansa Ikonen), abandon her singing career. Tired of his behavior, Kirsti fakes her suicide on the seashore. When her body is not found, the police launch a missing person investigation. A suspicious police officer notices Kirsti loitering in a park, prompting her to flee into a house occupied by three bachelors: a professor, his servant Kalle, and a composer named Rantamaa. Introducing herself as a country girl who mistakenly entered the house, Kirsti manages to stay as a maid, despite the men's initial reluctance to allow women into their home. Over time, Kirsti's talent and charm win them over, culminating in a romance with Rantamaa.

== Cast ==
- Ansa Ikonen as Kirsti Kalpa
- Uuno Laakso as Kalle
- Aku Korhonen as the professor
- Unto Salminen as composer Rantamaa
- Ture Junttu as Baron Heimonheimo
- Laina Laine as actress
- Pentti Saares as reporter
- Veikko Linna as theater director
- Arvo Kuusla as Eikka, photographer
- Ensio Jouko as police commissioner
- Toppo Elonperä as janitor
- Eino Salmi as theater accountant
- Olavi Saarinen as policeman
- Lauri Kyöstilä as customs officer
- Kyösti Käyhkö as radio doorman
- Jalmari Rinne as radio music director
- Usko Kantola as operetta singer
- Heikki Aaltoila as Unto Salminen's stand-in

== Production ==
Filming of Woman is the Wild Card took place from January to June 1944. Outdoor scenes were shot in Helsinki and Vantaa, including locations such as Helsinki-Malmi Airport. The professor's residence was portrayed by a 1920 building designed by Armas Siitonen in the Eira district. Studio scenes were filmed at SF Studio 1.

Woman is the Wild Card is notable as the second Finnish feature film directed by a woman. The first was Glory Leppänen's Onnenpotku (1936).

== Reception ==
While the film received fewer viewers than average, critics cautiously praised Ikonen's debut. Helsingin Sanomat reviewer Paula Talaskivi lauded her directorial skill but criticized the story as outdated. Other critics appreciated her ability to maximize the script's potential. Ikonen's performance and the roles of Korhonen and Laakso were particularly commended.

== Release ==
Nainen on valttia premiered on Finnish television on 13 February 1966. It was later released on DVD by Finnkino.
