= Rauha Rentola =

Finnish actress (1919–2005)

Rauha Olivia Elisabet Rentola (4 February 1919, Kuhmoinen − 20 July 2005) was a Finnish actress. During her career, she appeared in close to a hundred films while also working for Finnish National Theatre for half a century.

== Selected filmography ==
- The Dead Man Falls in Love (1942)
- Light Melody (1946)
- Tree Without Fruit (1947)
- Suopursu kukkii (1947)
- Prinsessa Ruusunen (1949)
- Radio tulee hulluksi (1952)
- April's Coming (1953)
- Shamrock (1953)
- Silja – nuorena nukkunut (1956)
- Tulipunainen kyyhkynen (1961)
- Kaasua, komisario Palmu! (1962)
