= Salli Karuna =

Finnish actress

- Born: 29 July 1902; Rauma, Grand Duchy of Finland
- Died: 2 November 1987 (aged 85); Helsinki, Finland
- Occupation: Actress
- Years active: 1938-1984 (film & TV)

Salli Karuna (1902–1987) was a Finnish film actress. She was married to the actor Ilmari Unho.

== Selected filmography ==
- Gabriel, Come Back (1951)
- Mother or Woman (1953)
- Shamrock (1953)
- Hilma's Name Day (1954)

== Bibliography ==
- Tad Bentley Hammer. International film prizes: an encyclopedia. Garland, 1991.
