= People Not as Bad as They Seem =

- DVD cover
- Directed by: Rauni Mollberg
- Written by: Aapeli
- Produced by: Rauni Mollberg
- Starring: Olavi Ahonen
- Cinematography: Hannu Peltomaa
- Edited by: Jorma Kuusisto
- Music by: Asser Fagerström
- Distributed by: Suomi-Filmi
- Release date: 7 October 1977
- Running time: 132 minutes
- Country: Finland
- Language: Finnish

People Not as Bad as They Seem (Finnish: Aika hyvä ihmiseksi) is a 1977 Finnish historical film directed by Rauni Mollberg, based on the novels by Aapeli.

The film premiered on 7 October 1977 in Finland and Sweden on 17 March 1978. It was screened in the Un Certain Regard section of the 1978 Cannes Film Festival. The film was re-released again in 2003 and premiered in the Czech Republic on 27 January 2003.

== Plot ==
The film is about a boy and the relationship between his birth mother and step mother.

== Cast ==
- Olavi Ahonen: Health inspector Hyttinen
- Lauri Arajuuri: Sulo Riippa
- Ossi Aronen: Pietari Jormalainen
- Asser Fagerström: Pianist
- Mika Hämäläinen: Viljami Pirhola
- Esko Hannula: Rusko, blacksmith
- Helge Herala: Captain
- Vihtori Hokka: Old civil guard
- Kalle Hollo: Primus Koljonen, coachman
- Esko Hukkanen.... Bailiff
- Kauko Hynninen: Chief of staff
- Kurt Ingvall: Lieutenant general
- Voitto Jokela: Violinist
- Irma Junnilainen: Klory of Vettenrantska
- Vappu Jurkka: Mrs. Rusko
- Martti Kainulainen: Harakka, janitor
- Einari Ketola: Jordan Kastikainen
- Marja Korhonen: Rakel Riippa
- Lilga Kovanko: Foreign dancer
- Paavo Laakso: Kusti
- Mikko Lecklin: Younger constable
- Hannes Lukinmaa: Vennu Harakka
- Kalle Luotonen: Pyökki, poet
- Toivo Mäkelä: Hurme, photographer
- Sirkka Metsäsaari: Vettenrantska
- Roni Mikkonen: Hati
- Mikko Nousiainen
- Salme Paasilinna: Clockmaker's wife
- Paavo Pajula: Kuikka, janitor
- Yrjö Paulo: Vähälä
- Eila Pehkonen: Mrs. Harakka
- Ossi Peura: Singer
- Risto Salmi: Jormalainen
- Veikko Salmi: Clockmaker
- Asko Sarkola: Palkeinen
- Irma Seikkula: Mrs. Valma Hurme
- Petri Skinnari: Henry
- Maija-Leena Soinne: Helga, waitress
- Mikko Tanhuanpää: Ferryman
- Toivo Tuomainen: Takkunen (as Topi Tuomainen)
- Matti Tuominen: Kekäläinen
- Rauha Valkonen: Ida Pirhola
- Raili Veivo: Karoliina
- Gustav Wiklund: Police chief
