= Enni Rekola =

Finnish actress

- Born: 26 November 1909; Viipuri, Grand Duchy of Finland
- Died: 19 March 1982 (aged 72)
- Occupation: Actress
- Years active: 1945-1963 (film & TV)

Enni Rekola (1909–1982) was a Finnish stage and film actress.

== Selected filmography ==
- Soot and Gold (1945)
- Golden Light (1946)
- Tree Without Fruit (1947)

== Bibliography ==
- Marjatta Ecaré & Irmeli Paavola. Tampereen Työväen Teatteri. Tampereen Työväen Teatteri, 1976.
