= The Scarlet Dove (1961 film) =

1961 film

- Original Finnish film poster
- Directed by: Matti Kassila
- Written by: Matti Kassila; Juha Nevalainen
- Produced by: T. J. Särkkä
- Starring: Tauno Palo
- Cinematography: Kalle Peronkoski
- Edited by: Elmer Lahti
- Release date: 10 March 1961
- Running time: 86 minutes
- Country: Finland
- Language: Finnish

The Scarlet Dove (Finnish: Tulipunainen kyyhkynen) is a 1961 Finnish thriller film directed and co-written by Matti Kassila. It was entered into the 11th Berlin International Film Festival. It was Tauno Palo's final screen role.

== Cast ==
- Tauno Palo - Dr. Olavi Aitamaa
- Gunvor Sandkvist - Helena Aitamaa
- Helen Elde - Irja Huurre / Ritva
- Matti Oravisto - Judge Rantanen / Helena's Lover
- Risto Mäkelä - Mankela
- Uuno Montonen - Pastor Svanholm
- Anton Soini - Man Laying by the Road / Shoe String Vendor / Laughing Man at the Street / Proferros Aitamaa
- Arttu Suuntala - Detective Maurila
- Pertti Palo - Young Man at the Kiosk
- Liana Kaarina - Kiosk Vendor
- Martta Kinnunen - Martta, House Maid
- Tauno Söder - Optician
- Paavo Hukkinen - Sailor
- Unto Salminen - Doctor at the Murder Scene
- Eila Pehkonen - Woman at the Customs Office
- Tuukka Soitso - Man at the Customs Office
- Irja Rannikko - Drug Store Keeper
- Rauha Rentola - Customer at the Drug Store
- Hannes Veivo - Detective
