= Ilmi Parkkari =

Finnish actress

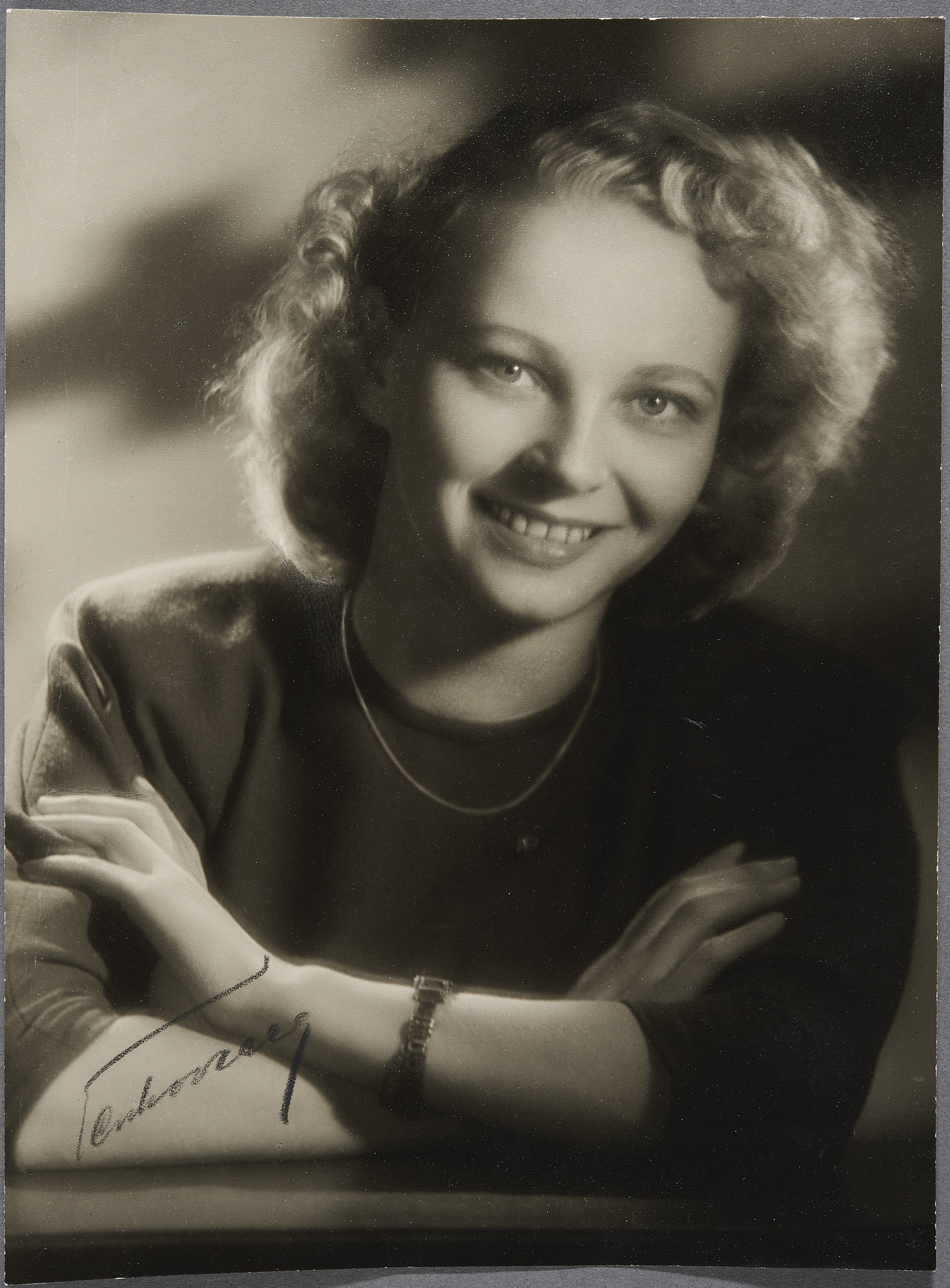
- Ms. Parkkari in the 1950s.
- Born: 6 April 1926; Uusikirkko, Finland
- Died: 14 May 1979 (aged 53); Kangasala, Finland
- Occupation: Actress
- Years active: 1948–1978 (film & TV)

Ilmi Parkkari (1926–1979) was a Finnish film and stage actress.

== Selected filmography ==
- Gabriel, Come Back (1951)
- The Girl from Moon Bridge (1953)

== Bibliography ==
- Gröndahl, Laura. Experiences in Theatrical Spaces: Five Scenographies of Miss Julie. University of Art and Design Helsinki, 2004.
