= Matti Oravisto =

Finnish actor (1921–2001)

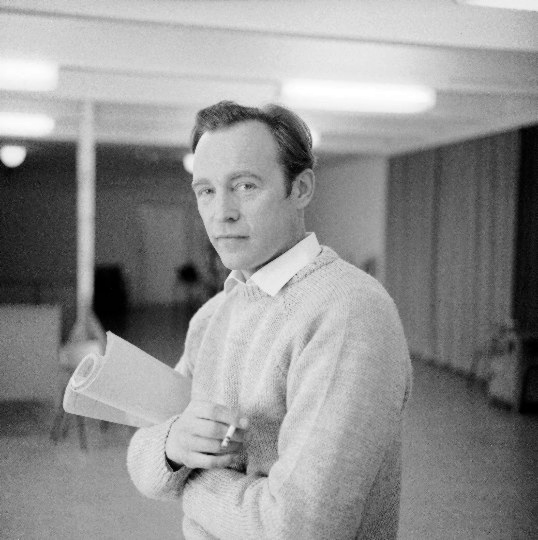
Matti Oravisto in 1965

Matti Kustavi Oravisto (23 October 1921 – 15 November 2001) was a Finnish actor who appeared in theatre, film and television.

Oravisto started to work as an actor in the Finnish National Theatre immediately after graduating from theatre school in 1947. Around the same time, he also began to receive small parts in films. His breakthrough role came with the award-winning Valentin Vaala film Ihmiset suviyössä (1948).

In the late 1950s, Oravisto returned to the National Theatre, but continued to act in films, although less frequently than in the past. Since the 1960s, Oravisto starred in numerous television productions.

Oravisto made his final film role in a Taru Mäkelä film Pikkusisar (1999). He died in November 2001.

== Selected filmography ==
- "Minä elän" (1946)
- Intohimon vallassa (1947)
- Ihmiset suviyössä (1948)
- Rakastin sinua, Hilde (1954)
- Sininen viikko (1954)
- Villi Pohjola (1955)
- Punainen viiva (1959)
- Komisario Palmun erehdys (1960)
- Tulipunainen kyyhkynen (1961)
- Oppenheimerin tapaus (1967)
- Tulipää (1980)
- Näkemiin, hyvästi (1986)
- Pikkusisar (1999)
