= Kalervo Nissilä =

(1913–1997) Finnish actor, director, and theater leader

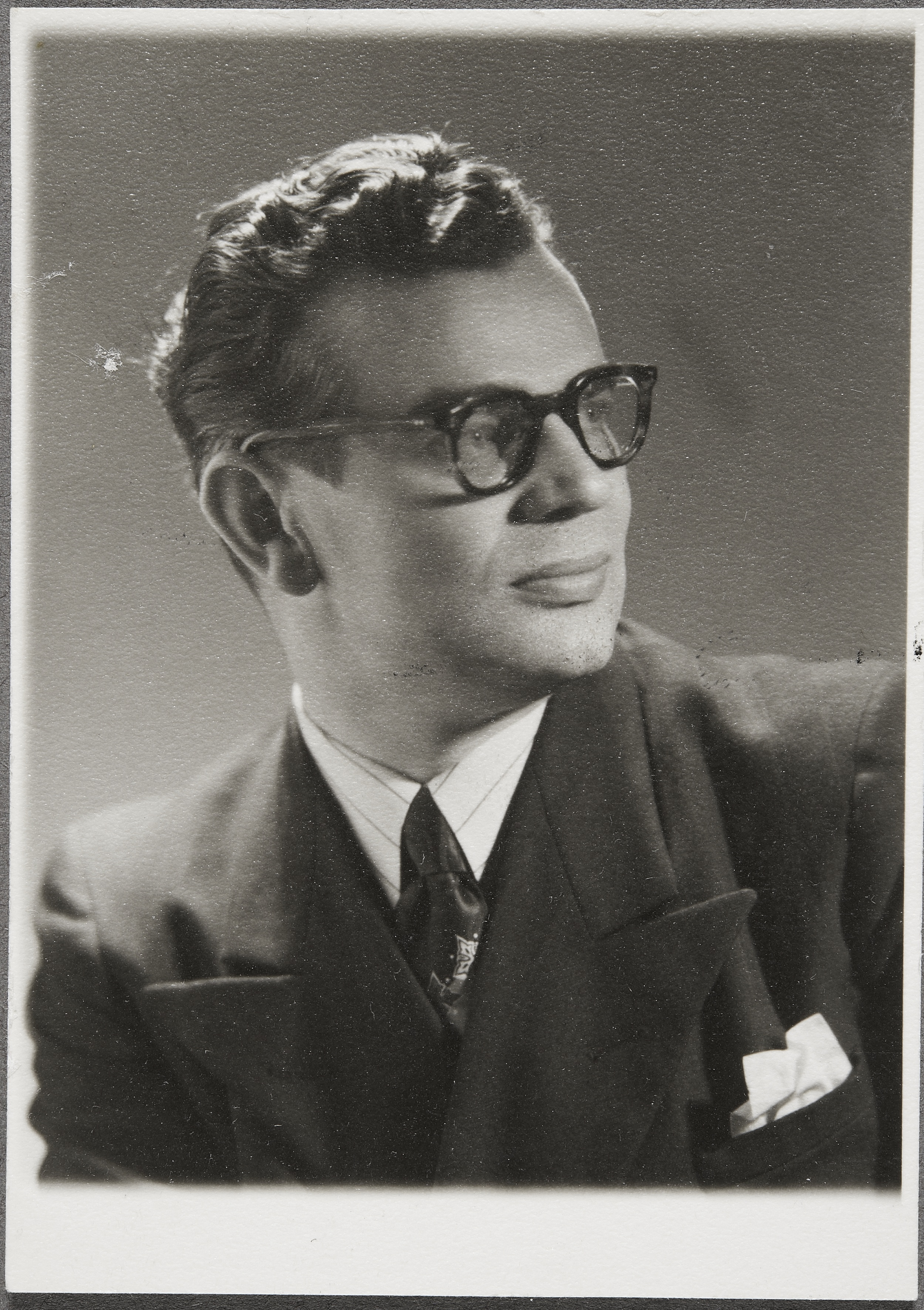
Kalervo Nissilä in the 1950s.

Kaino Kalervo Nissilä (11 July 1913 – 30 March 1997) was a Finnish actor and a theatre leader. He is best remembered for such films as Härmästä poikia kymmenen (1950), Sadan miekan mies and Valkoinen peura (1952).

Nissilä was also known as a singer. He gave concerts around Finland and made a guest appearance at the Finnish National Opera.

== Filmography ==
- Härmästä poikia kymmenen (1950)
- Sadan miekan mies (1951)
- Kuisma ja Helinä (1951)
- Valkoinen peura (1952)
- Yksityisalue (1962)
- Naiset, jotka minulle annoit (1962)
- Villin Pohjolan kulta (1963)
- Rakkaus alkaa aamuyöstä (1966)
- Tammenlehvät (1991) as director
