= Sadan miekan mies =

- Original Finnish film poster
- Directed by: Ilmari Unho
- Written by: Simo Penttilä
- Produced by: Risto Orko
- Starring: Kalervo Nissilä; Marja Korhonen; Toini Vartiainen; Uljas Kandolin
- Cinematography: Eino Heino
- Edited by: Armas Laurinen
- Music by: Tauno Pylkkänen
- Production company: Suomi-Filmi
- Release date: 31 August 1951
- Running time: 78 minutes
- Country: Finland
- Language: Finnish
- Budget: FIM 17,501,812

Sadan miekan mies ("The Man of a Hundred Swords" in English) is a Finnish historical adventure comedy film from 1951 directed by Ilmari Unho. The film takes place in the 1630s in the Finnish county Varsinais-Suomi, and tells the story of a heroic swordsman on an assignment from the king, and on their journey, the swordsman and he's partner encounter foes and damsels. The film was first shown on television on 7 March 1964.

== Actors ==
Actor	Role
Kalervo Nissilä	… captain Olavi Matinpoika Kaarnaoja eli Barkenhjelm
Marja Korhonen	… Elisabeth Gyllenskiöld
Toini Vartiainen	… Kristiina Gyllenskiöld
Uljas Kandolin	… sergeant Hannu Eerikinpoika
Ture Junttu	… Krister Kristerinpoika Gyllenskiöld
Aku Korhonen	… jailor
Oke Tuuri	… Kymäläisen Taavetti
Jorma Nortimo	… father Morano, Martens van Heeren
Heikki Savolainen	… Komsi
Vilho Siivola	… master Matias Mollerus
Matti Aulos	… innkeeper Bachter
Maija Karhi	… maid Liisa
Kauko Käyhkö	… sergeant Susi
Arvo Lehesmaa	… Jonne
Leo Riuttu	… soldier
Lauri Lahtinen	… soldier
Oiva Sala	… Nikko
Ilmari Peitsalo	… Henrikki
Veikko Linna	… task master at Turku castle

== Synopsis ==
=== Koskela manor ===
The year is 1634, two years after the king of Sweden Gustav II Adolf fell on the battlefield of Lützen. Captain of Kaarnoja, also known as the "man of a hundred swords", "poor man beyond the seas" or "take-life-Olavi", rides with his companion Hannu Eerikinpoika to the manor house of Koskela. At the manor they meet Krister Kristerinpoika, and the captain ends up dueling with him in the maiden chamber of Krister's cousin, the beautiful Elisabeth Gyllenskiöld. Elisabeth doesn't like her cousin and reveals to the captain that Krister is secretly plotting against him. The captain is delivering a letter to one Ståhlhandske. He leaves the letter with Elisabeth before leaving Koskela. The secret plan of Krister is to ambush the captain and his companion near the abandoned Lehikko croft on their way to Turku. The duo approach the croft prepared, but when they arrive they meet only two goodhearted mercenaries with thick Karelia accent Komsi and Taavetti, the comic characters of the movie.

=== The Three Pint tavern ===
After arriving in Turku the captain and his companion Hannu decide to stay in the Three Pint tavern. The tavern's maid warns the men about Mollerus, the errand boy of Martens van Heeren. Mollerus gives the heroes valuable information after the men threaten Mollerus with torture. The following scene takes place in the house of Kurki which van Heeren is renting. Van Heeren is scheming with Krister Kirsterinpoika, together with his cousin, the beautiful blond Kristiina Gyllenskiöld. Van Herren's motives are revealed: He wants to return the kingdom of Sweden under the protection of the holy church, Vatican.

The captain and Hannu infiltrate the house of Kurki in the darkness of the night. Kristiina has been assigned to seduce the captain, but she mistakenly seduces Hannu who enters her bedroom instead. Hannu is enchanted by Kristiina. Meanwhile, the captain enters the bedroom of Kristiina's cousin Elisabeth. Captain and Elisabeth know each other, and after an argument they end up kissing. Kristen and van Heeren demand to know if the captain is with Elisabeth, and, while the captain is next to her in bed, she lies he is not with her.

=== Turku castle ===
The heroes can't escape the house of Kurki without a fight. They win the fight against superior numbers, and after saying their goodbyes to Elisabeth and Kristiina, ride to Turku castle with raised swords. Krister Kristerinpoika has set a trap there, and the captain and Hannu end up in a prison cell. Van Heeren and Krister interrogate the captain about the king's letter. The captain stays strong, and manages to capture Turku castle with the help of Komsi and Taavetti. The adventure continues to the Koskela manor through the castle's dungeons.

=== Good triumphs over bad ===
The cousins Elisabeth and Kristiina return to Koskela manor before the captain and his friends. At Koskela, a farmhand tells the cousins that Ståhlhandske has arrived. This is however a lie, with van Heeren behind it. The women end up in a sword fight with van Heeren. The captain arrives, and van Heeren loses the fight. Van Heeren's true identity is revealed and he is handed to Ståhlhandske who by now has actually arrived. Elisabeth hands over the letter to Ståhhandske, and van Heeren's game is over.

The final act is played in Turku castle. Elisabeth is too nervous to approach the captain, but with the help a small ploy they end up together. On the castle wall the noble beauty and the hero, man of a hundred swords, embrace in the final kiss.

== Production and awards ==
Outdoor shooting for the move took place in the surroundings of the medieval Kuitila manor in Pargas and in Luostarinmäki and the castle in Turku. The Turku castle appearing twice in a full frame shot is of a model, because the actual surroundings were not suitable for the 17th century period of the movie. The fencing instructor for the actors was the French Roger Blanc, who was the instructor of the Finnish fencing team and also taught at the Theatre academy for a few of year.

The producer successfully complained about high taxes and the movie was exempt from all taxes. Roy a.k.a. Tapio Vilpponen won the best set design -award in Jussi Awards for this and the movie Gabriel, tule takaisin on 19.3.1951 at Hotelli Aulanko.

== Reception ==
The editor of Suomen kansallisfilmografia -collection Kari Uusitalo chose Sadan miekan mies as one of top 100 significant Finnish films in the 1990 Mitä missä milloin -book. Thanks to this movie, the lead actor Kalervo Nissilä was called the Errol Flynn of Finland.

Contemporary reviewers generally agreed that the Finnish adventure film had earned its place, with some room for improvements in directing.

== Sources ==
=== Further reading ===
- Suomen kansallisfilmografia 4, ISBN 9513705757
- Mitä missä milloin 1990, ISBN 951-1-10908-1
