= Tarmo Manni =

Finnish actor

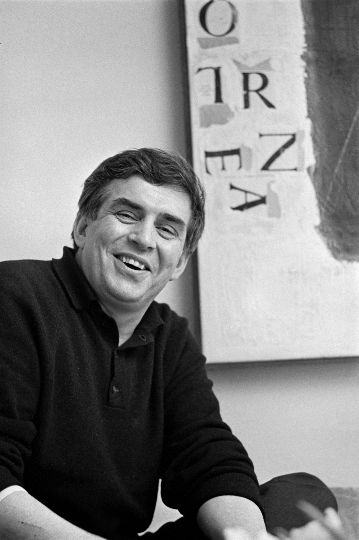
Tarmo Manni in 1966

Tarmo Manni (30 July 1921, in Saarijärvi – 24 September 1999, in Helsinki) was a Finnish theatre and film actor. He worked for the Finnish National Theatre 41 years of his 44-year career and appeared in 65 films from 1944 to 1999. Manni was known as a flamboyant persona, on and off stage. However, in his final theatre performance, he just sat in a chair for an hour, listening to Gustav Mahler's First Symphony.

== Selected filmography ==
- Dynamiittityttö (1944)
- Ihmiset suviyössä (1948)
- Prinsessa Ruusunen (1949)
- Gabriel, Come Back (1951)
- Omena putoaa (1952)
- April's Coming (1953)
- Hilman päivät (1954)
- Kun on tunteet (1954)
- The Unknown Soldier (1955)
- Punainen viiva (1959)
- Koko kaupungin Vinski (1969)
- Da Capo (1985)
- Jäähyväiset presidentille (1987)
