= Oiva Paloheimo =

Finnish writer (1910–1973)

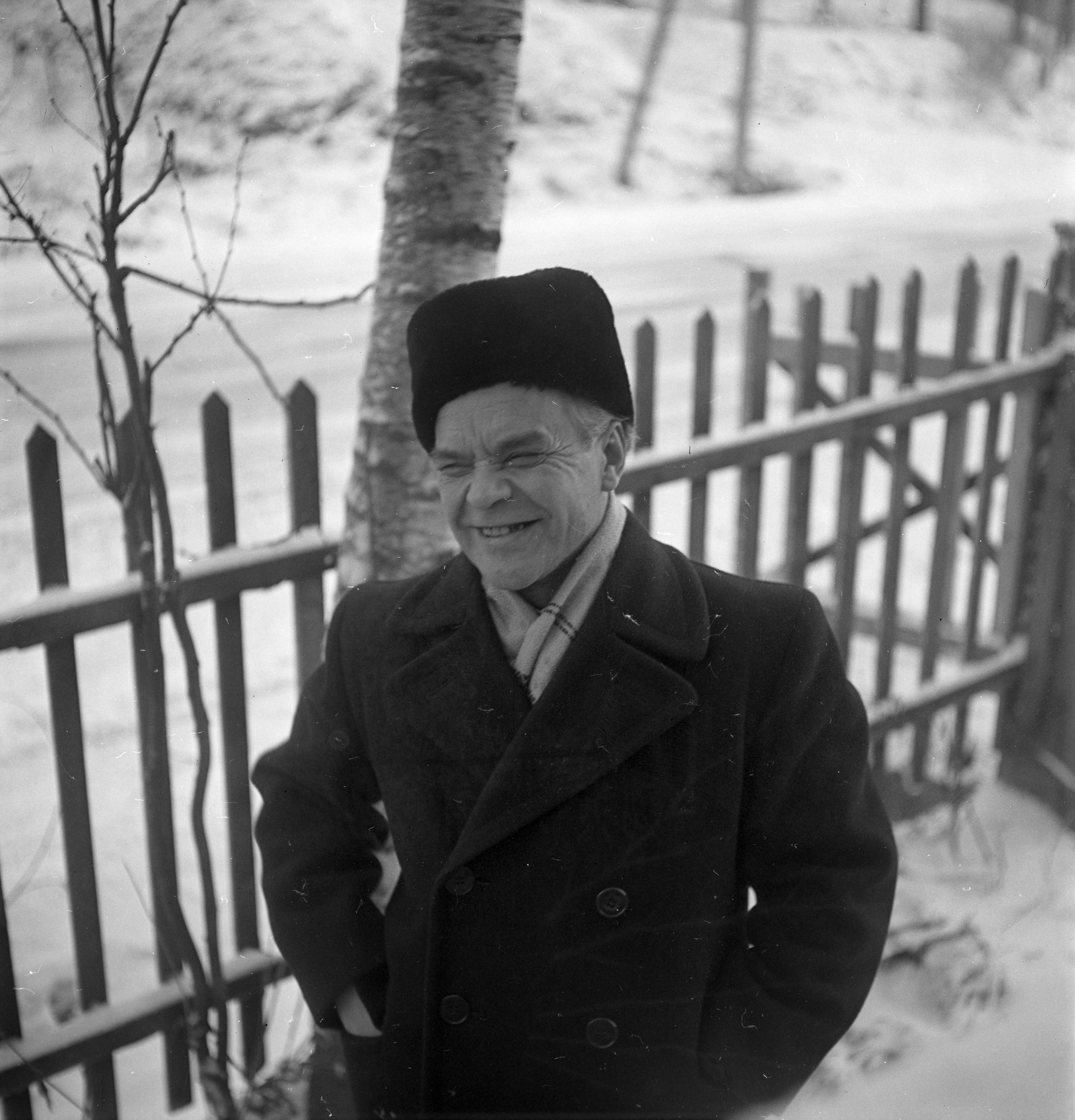
- Born: 2 September 1910; Tampere, Finland
- Died: 13 June 1973 (aged 63); Helsinki, Finland
- Occupation: Writer
- Notable work: Tirlittan (1953)

Oiva Aukusti Paloheimo (2 September 1910 – 13 June 1973) was a Finnish author who wrote novels, short stories, poems and aphorisms. His best-known work is the children's book Tirlittan from 1953.

== Life ==
Oiva was born under the surname Pietilä until 1911, when it became Paloheimo. His parents were businessman Aukusti Pietilä (later Paloheimo) and 16-year-old merchant's daughter Katri Salonen. Paloheimo was separated from his mother immediately after birth, and because his father toured all over Finland in his business work, Oiva Paloheimo often had to live with his aunts as a child. After his father died of Spanish flu, when Oiva was eight years old, he moved to Kangasala as the foster child of his father's younger brother Heikki Pietilä. Life without parents strongly influenced his literary production.

Paloheimo wrote his first play Kauppakirja at the age of nine and also began writing poems and short stories. He published his first short stories under the pseudonym Oiva Kaisla in various magazines, and the first short story published under his own name appeared in the Sunday supplement of Aamulehti in 1926. In 1930–1933, Paloheimo studied for some time at the University of Tampere's newspaper line. However, poor success, especially in languages, and financial problems interrupted his studies. His first book, a poem collection Vaeltava laulaja, was published in 1935. He spent the following years making his autobiographical novel Restless Childhood (Levoton lapsuus), which was published in 1942. Paloheimo was a journalist at Mikkelin Sanomat and Länsi-Savo newspapers. During the wars, he served as a front correspondent.

In 1946–1952, Paloheimo and his family lived in the courtyard building of the Vesilahti rectory. His second wife's father, Kalle Kahiluoto, was then pastor of Vesilahti. After entering the parish pastor, Harri Hentinen had turned it into a museum. The building was destroyed in a fire on 29 November 2018.

From 1953, Paloheimo lived in Oulunkylä, Helsinki, first in a wooden house bequeathed by Larin-Kyösti to the Union of Finnish Writers in Veräjämäki and later in Mäkitorpantie 40 until his death. His last work was the poem collection Palaa ne linnut vielä, published in 1962.

== Personal life ==
Oiva Paloheimo was married three times: 1938–1945 with Maila Ahvenainen, 1945–1953 with Sirkka-Liisa Kahiluoto and 1956–1969 with Anna Sinikka Räty. Paloheimo had two children from the first union and three from the second. The first two unions ended in resignation due to Paloheimo's infidelity and alcohol use. Paloheimo also had financial difficulties, as much of his income went to child support payments. In recent years, illnesses also began to affect the life of Paloheimo.

== Awards ==
- Finnish Literature Society Prize 1936
- Finnish State Prize for Literature 1942, 1946, 1949, 1952, 1953
- Kalevi Jäntti Award 1944
- Pro Finlandia Medal 1959
