= Mikkeli hostage crisis =

1986 crime in Finland

- Location: Helsinki, Finland; Mikkeli, Finland
- Date: August 8–9, 1986
- Attack type: Bank robbery Hostage taking
- Weapons: Sawed-off shotgun Explosive charge
- Deaths: 2 (including the perpetrator)
- Injuries: 9
- Perpetrator: Jorma Takala

The Mikkeli hostage crisis, or Jakomäki bank robbery took place on 8–9 August 1986, which ended in Mikkeli, South Savo, Finland, outside of the Mikkeli County Government House on Maaherrankatu. The crisis began when the perpetrator, Jorma Kalevi Takala (born July 11, 1950) took three hostages in Helsinki in a bank robbery, with whom he traveled by car to Mikkeli. The event ended when Takala blew up his car, killing himself and hostage Jukka Häkkinen (born May 13, 1961). In the aftermath of the incident, the Finnish police were subjected to harsh criticism.

== Events ==
The events began on 8 August 1986, when Jorma Takala, armed with a sawed-off shotgun and an explosive charge, entered the Kansallis-Osake-Pankki bank in Jakomäki, Helsinki. Takala took twelve people inside the bank as his hostages. After receiving 2.5 million Finnish marks and a getaway car in exchange for most of the hostages, he left the bank with three remaining hostages, two female and one male. Takala forced the male hostage to drive the car, following Highway 4 and later Highway 5.

The party arrived in Mikkeli on 9 August, where they parked in front of the Mikkeli County Government House. Finnish police surrounded the vehicle and tried to negotiate with Takala. When he threatened to blow up the car if he was not allowed to continue his journey, the police advised the hostages to leave the vehicle. Both female hostages complied, after which the police started to shoot at the car. In response, Takala detonated the charge and destroyed the vehicle, killing both himself and the male hostage. Nine police officers were injured in the explosion.

== Aftermath ==
The police received much criticism for its handling of the crisis. Nobody knew who gave the order to shoot at the car and initially none of the police commanders took the responsibility for the operation. After an investigation by the National Bureau of Investigation, Chancellor of Justice Jorma S. Aalto decided not to prosecute the police officers for the events. In 1993, the Supreme Court of Finland convicted the police commissioner who led the operation of involuntary manslaughter and negligence and fined him 6,000 mk.
