= Aino Lohikoski =

Finnish actress

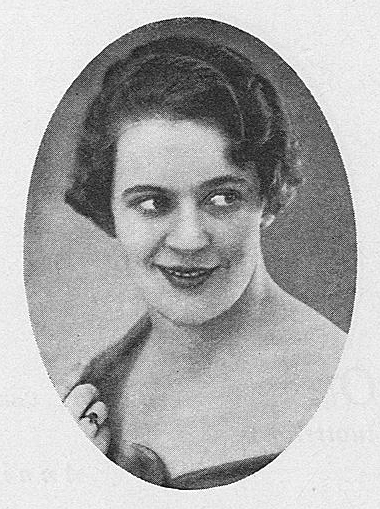
- Lohikoski in the early 1930s
- Born: 4 March 1898; Helsinki, Finland
- Died: 12 June 1981 (aged 83)
- Occupation: Actress
- Years active: 1925-1976 (film & TV)

Aino Lohikoski (1898–1981) was a Finnish actress.

== Selected filmography ==
- Substitute Wife (1936)
- Tree Without Fruit (1947)
- Mother or Woman (1953)

== Bibliography ==
- Qvist, Per Olov & von Bagh, Peter. Guide to the Cinema of Sweden and Finland. Greenwood Publishing Group, 2000.
