= Uuno Laakso =

Finnish actor

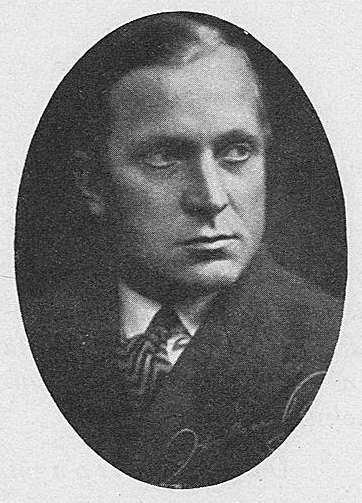
- Laakso in the early 1930s
- Born: 1 October 1896; Hollola, Finland
- Died: 6 December 1956 (aged 60); Helsinki, Finland
- Occupation: Actor
- Years active: 1924–1956 (film)

Uuno Laakso (1896–1956) was a Finnish film actor. He was married to the actress Rakel Laakso.

Laakso committed suicide by overdosing on sleeping pills at the age of 60. He is buried in the Hietaniemi Cemetery in Helsinki.

== Selected filmography ==
- Voi meitä! Anoppi tulee (1933)
- Substitute Wife (1936)
- Woman is the Wild Card (1944)
- Soot and Gold (1945)

== Bibliography ==
- Pietari Kääpä. Directory of World Cinema: Finland. Intellect Books, 2012.
