= Ansa Ikonen =

Finnish actress (1913–1989)

Aili Ansa Inkeri Ikonen
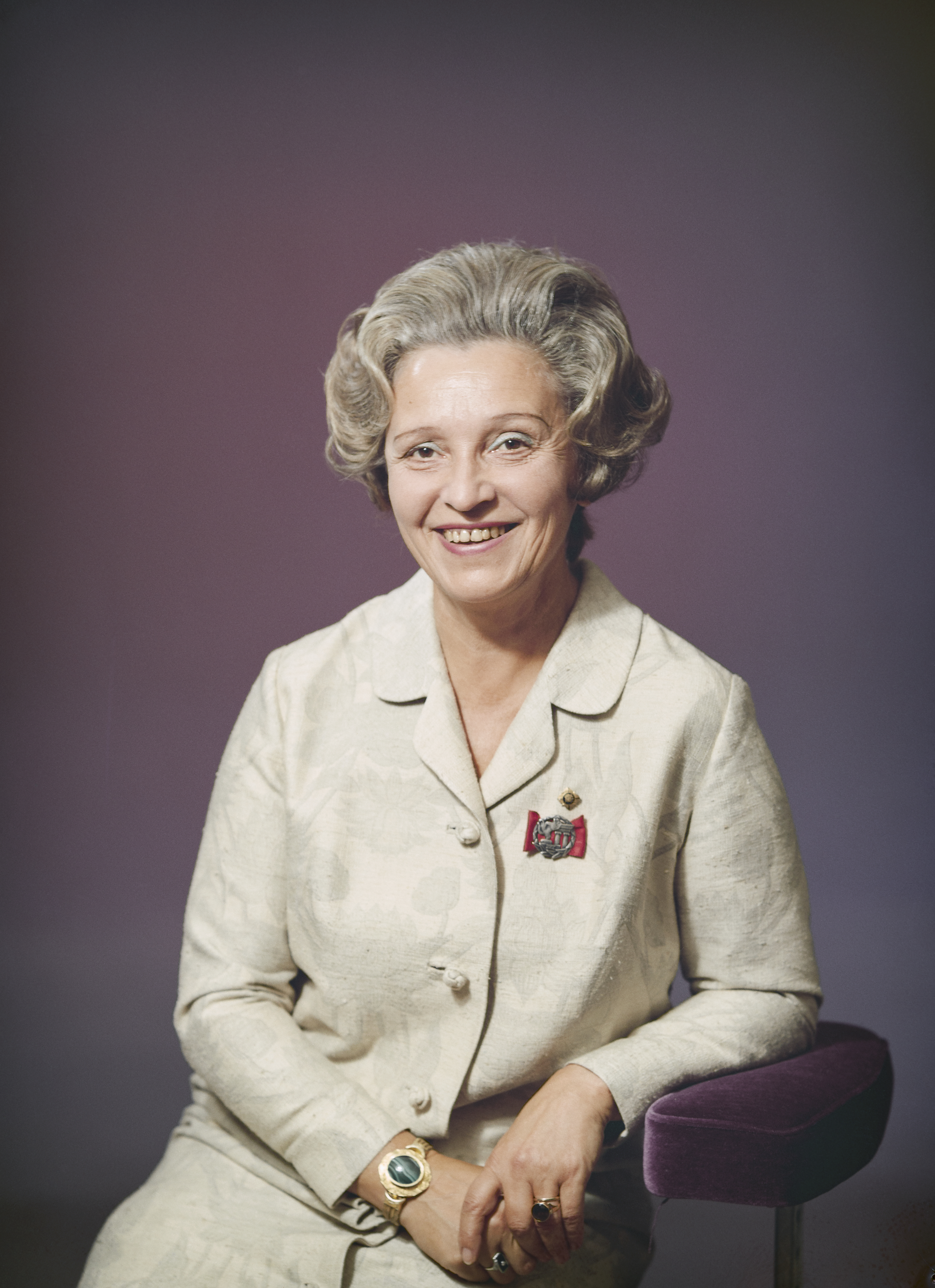
- Ikonen in 1971
- Born: 19 December 1913; Saint Petersburg, Russian Empire
- Died: 23 May 1989 (aged 75); Helsinki, Finland
- Occupation(s): actress, director

Aili Ansa Inkeri Ikonen (19 December 1913 – 23 May 1989) was a Finnish film and theater actress. Ikonen was an intelligent comedian and a skillful character actress. In a film career spanning three decades, Ikonen appeared in dozens of films, and was one of the most popular actresses of her time. Ansa Ikonen and Tauno Palo became the golden couple of Finnish cinema. She was one of the first four Finnish women film directors.

== Life and career ==
Ikonen was born to Finnish parents in St. Petersburg, Russia, in 1913, but after the October Revolution her family moved to Finland. She studied to become a music teacher but never worked in that occupation. Instead she aimed for career in cinema. After some minor roles the famous director Valentin Vaala cast her as a leading lady in Kaikki rakastavat ("Everybody's Love", 1935). Tauno Palo was the leading man. Next year Ikonen and Palo performed in another marriage comedy. Both films became successful, and Ansa Ikonen became a star. For years she was among the best known film actresses in Finland.

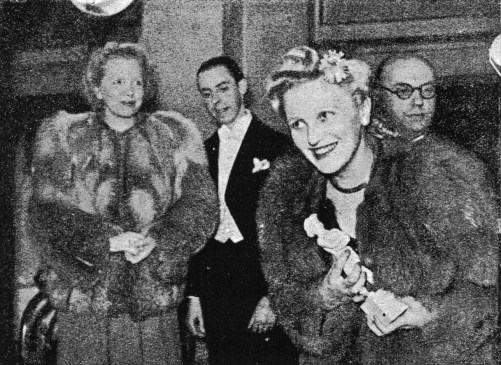
Ikonen received Jussi for Best Actress at Jussi Awards in 1944.

Ikonen and Palo made altogether 12 films together, most of them comedies. Although not romantically linked in real life, the two nevertheless captured the audiences' imagination as the golden couple of Finnish cinema.

At the same time with her film career, Ikonen was also hired in the Finnish national theatre. Her career there lasted for 44 years. She played in classical play by Finnish and foreign authors. She played in 16 Shakespeare plays, six plays by Molière and Nora in Ibsen's Doll's house.

Ikonen was an intelligent comedian and a skillful character actress. Writers sometimes wrote roles specially for her. She did not have any formal education for theatre, but as a film star she quickly learned the tricks of the trade. In 1949 she got a stipendium and attended Old Vics Theatre school in London.

Ikonen also directed a romantic comedy Nainen on valttia ("Woman is the Wild Card") in 1944.

Ikonen was married to actor Jalmari Rinne and had two daughters: Katriina Rinne and Marjatta Rinne. Because her husband was 20 years older, she often played the role of his daughter in plays where they worked together.

== Filmography (selection) ==
- Minä ja ministeri (1934)
- Syntipukki ("The Scapegoat") (1935)
- Koskenlaskijan morsian (1937)
- Kuriton sukupolvi (1937)
- Rykmentin murheenkryyni (1938)
- SF-paraati ("SF Parade") (1940)
- Runon kuningas ja muuttolintu (1940)
- Oi, kallis Suomenmaa (1940)
- Kulkurin valssi ("The Vagabond's Waltz") (1941)
- Vaivaisukon morsian (1944; Winner of the Jussi Award for Best Actress)
- Nainen on valttia ("Woman is the Wild Card") (1944); also director
- Soot and Gold (1945)
- Pikajuna pohjoiseen (1947)
- Gabriel, tule takaisin (Gabriel, Come Back) (1951)
- The Girl from Moon Bridge (1953)
- Rakas lurjus ("Beloved Rascal") (1955)
- Ratkaisun päivät (1956)
- Äidittömät (1958)
- Telefon (1977)

== Selected stage credits ==
- Roxane (Edmond Rostand: Cyrano de Bergerac)
- Catherine (Muriel Spark: Doctors of Philosophy)
- Lady Teazle (Richard Sheridan: The School for Scandal)
- Katarina Thorwöst (Serp: Katarina, kaunis leski)
- Isabella (William Shakespeare: Measure for Measure)
- Nora (Henrik Ibsen: A Doll's House)
- Kirsti Mara (Tuuli Reijonen: Ovi avautuu)
- Beatrice (William Shakespeare: Much Ado About Nothing)
- Marja Myllymies (Ilmari Turja: Raha ja sana)
- Hilde (Henrik Ibsen: The Master Builder)
- Julia (William Shakespeare: Romeo and Juliet)
- Juulia (Maria Jotuni: Tohvelisankarin rouva)
- Portia (William Shakespeare: The Merchant of Venice)
