= Yksityisalue =

1962 film

- Directed by: Maunu Kurkvaara
- Written by: Maunu Kurkvaara
- Produced by: Maunu Kurkvaara
- Starring: Kalervo Nissilä; Kyllikki Forssell; Jarno Hiilloskorpi; Sinikka Hannula; Pehr-Olof Sirén; Sointu Angervo
- Cinematography: Maunu Kurkvaara
- Edited by: Maunu Kurkvaara
- Music by: Usko Meriläinen
- Release date: 5 October 1962
- Running time: 83 minutes
- Country: Finland
- Language: Finnish
- Budget: approx. 7,000,000 FIM

Yksityisalue (Private Area) is a 1962 Finnish drama film directed by Maunu Kurkvaara. In keeping with his characteristic working style, Kurkvaara also wrote, produced, shot, edited, and designed the film himself. The film was entered into the 13th Berlin International Film Festival.

Yksityisalue received the State Film Award in 1962 and the Jussi Award for Best Music in 1963.

The film explores the suicide of a successful architect and the investigation into its motives, while also offering a critique of the rapid post-war construction boom and contemporary Finnish architecture.

== Plot ==
Young architect Pentti Vaara discovers the body of his superior, Toivo Koski, at Koski’s villa. The cause of death is suicide. Koski’s wife Margit and Dr. Carlstedt agree to report the cause of death as a heart attack. The true cause remains a secret shared only by Pentti, Margit, and the doctor.

Pentti begins to investigate the final weeks of Toivo’s life with the help of Mäkelä, an experienced man of the world. The narrative unfolds through personal objects and a diary, leading into flashbacks depicting Toivo’s last weeks. These reveal Toivo’s growing disillusionment with modern Finnish architecture, which he largely considers artistically and ethically bankrupt.

It emerges that Toivo had affairs with two young employees at his office, Kaisu and Soili. He was dissatisfied with his recent competition entry and increasingly exhausted and frustrated. Toivo ultimately arranges events so that Pentti will be the one to discover his body.

In the final scene, Pentti and Mäkelä attend Toivo’s funeral in winter. Pentti then encounters Soili, and the two walk away together along a birch-lined avenue.

== Cast ==
- Kalervo Nissilä as Toivo Koski
- Kyllikki Forssell as Margit Koski
- Jarno Hiilloskorpi as Pentti Vaara
- Sinikka Hannula as Kaisu
- Sointu Angervo as Soili
- Pehr-Olof Sirén as Mäkelä
- Kaarlo Halttunen as Dr. Carlstedt
- Esko Mannermaa as Judge Salin
- Aimo Tepponen as Architect
- Sasu Haapanen as Building contractor

== Production ==
By the time of Yksityisalue, Kurkvaara had already established his working methods. He typically used only a single take to prevent actors from losing energy through repeated retakes, rehearsing extensively beforehand. His standard practices included post-dubbing and the use of a silent camera.

Kurkvaara believed that a film should fully reflect the director’s vision and that the crew should be kept small, aiming for what he described as an “intensive tone”.

== Reception ==
Yksityisalue received mostly positive reviews from contemporary critics. Paula Talaskivi of Helsingin Sanomat described it as Kurkvaara’s best film to date, praising its visual expressiveness while criticizing the screenplay as thin. Heikki Eteläpää of Uusi Suomi similarly found the narrative lacking in depth.

Younger critics responded more enthusiastically. Risto Hannula of Parnasso praised the film’s “purposeful confidence”, while Peter von Bagh described it as Kurkvaara’s finest work in a survey for Ylioppilaslehti. Jörn Donner reviewed the film favorably in Dagens Nyheter despite noting its shortcomings.

In his book Sininen laulu, von Bagh described Yksityisalue as “a fine exploration” of the social and personal anxieties of its time.

== Releases ==
Yksityisalue premiered on Finnish television on 19 February 1968, attracting more than one million viewers—nearly a quarter of Finland’s population at the time.

Finnkino Oy has released the film on DVD, along with the other two parts of Kurkvaara’s trilogy.
