= Eero Roine =

Finnish actor

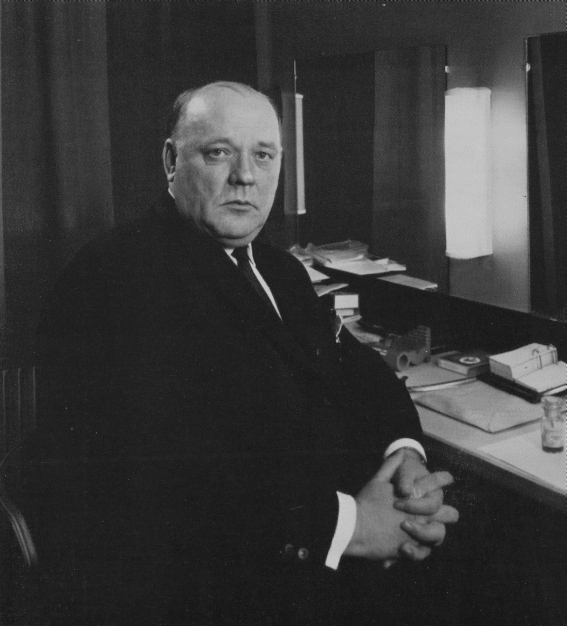
Eero Roine in the early 1960s

Eero Rafael Roine (10 February 1904 – 8 June 1966) was a Finnish actor. He had a long career on stage and also appeared in several films. Actress Eila Roine was Eero Roine's daughter.

== Selected filmography ==
- Tukkijoella (1937)
- Ihmiset suviyössä (1948)
- Kipparikvartetti (1952)
- Opri (1954)
- Kuu on vaarallinen (1962)
