= Kaisu Leppänen =

Finnish actress (1904–1993)

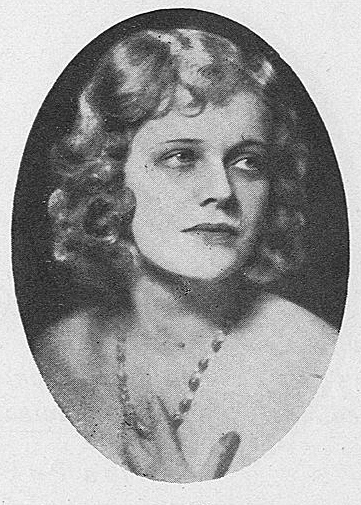
Kaisu Leppänen in early 1930s

Katri Sisko "Kaisu" Leppänen (13 October 1904 – 4 March 1993) was a Finnish actress. She worked for over 40 years in the Finnish National Theatre and appeared in 41 films between 1929 and 1987. She was born in Turku, and was married to actor Ilmari Unho from 1927 to 1930. She later married another actor Tauno Majuri. She died in Helsinki, aged 88.

== Selected filmography ==
- Noidan kirot (1927)
- Korkein voitto (1929)
- Ihmiset suviyössä (1948)
- The Girl from Moon Bridge (1953)
- Pastori Jussilainen (1955)
- Täällä Pohjantähden alla (1968)
- Pohjantähti (1973)
- Petos (1988)
