= The Wild North (1955 film) =

- Original Finnish film poster.
- Directed by: Aarne Tarkas
- Written by: Aarne Tarkas
- Produced by: Mauno Mäkelä
- Starring: Tapio Rautavaara; Elina Pohjanpää; Matti Oravisto; Aino-Maija Tikkanen
- Cinematography: Esko Nevalainen
- Edited by: Kauko Vuorensola
- Music by: Harry Bergström
- Production company: Fennada-Filmi
- Release date: September 30, 1955
- Running time: 101 minutes
- Country: Finland
- Language: Finnish
- Budget: FIM 19 million (Note: $3.6 million)

The Wild North (Finnish: Villi Pohjola) is a 1955 Finnish Western comedy adventure film written and directed by Aarne Tarkas. The film is starring by Tapio Rautavaara and Elina Pohjanpää.

The film was not a box office success, generating losses of four million Finnish marks, (Note: $771,000) and the film's reception was also mixed. However, the film received two sequels in 1963: Gold from the Wild North and The Secret Valley in the Wild North.

== Plot ==
The time of the events is not specified in the film and the events are said to take place in the fictional town of Utopila in the Wild North, a place that "cannot be found on maps and encyclopedias." Karin Turkka, searching for the murderer of her geologist father and a map of a lost gold deposit, arrives in Utopila, where the village community, ruled by Mayor Markus, directs her to the trail of Tundra-Tauno, former guide of her father and the suspect of the murder.

== Cast ==
- Tapio Rautavaara as Tundra-Tauno
- Elina Pohjanpää as Karin Turkka
- Matti Oravisto as Officer
- Aino-Maija Tikkanen as Maija
- Matti Tamminen as Mayor Markus
- Leo Jokela as Cardsharp

== See also ==
- List of Euro-Western films
- List of Finnish films of the 1950s
