= Ihmiset suviyössä =

1934 Finnish novel

- English language translation of Ihmiset suviyössä, translated as People in the Summer Night (1989 University of Wisconsin Press translation)
- Author: Frans Eemil Sillanpää
- Language: Finnish
- Publisher: Otava
- Publication date: 1934
- Publication place: Finland
- Pages: 226 pages

Ihmiset suviyössä is a novel by Finnish author Frans Eemil Sillanpää. It was released in 1934. In 1948, Valentin Vaala directed a film based on the book. The fifth edition of the novel was published that year.

Ihmiset suviyössä has been said to be an ode to a Finnish summer night. It deals with the biggest issues of life; birth, death and what effects love or the lack of it has on man.
