= Tauno Palo =

Finnish actor and singer

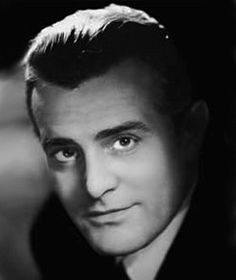
- Tauno Palo in the 1940s
- Born: Tauno Brännäs; 25 October 1908; Hämeenlinna, Finland
- Died: 24 May 1982 (aged 73); Helsinki, Finland
- Occupations: actor, singer
- Years active: 1927–1973
- Notable work: Vaimoke (1936); Kulkurin valssi (1941); Rosvo-Roope (1949)

Tauno Valdemar Palo (born Tauno Brännäs; 25 October 1908 – 24 May 1982) was a Finnish actor and singer in what some consider the golden age of Finnish cinema.

Film historian Peter von Bagh described Palo as one of the most prominent and influential actors in Finnish cinema, noting his ability to combine light, youthful roles with more dramatic performances, particularly in the theatre.

His most famous roles were perhaps in Kulkurin valssi ("The Vagabond's Waltz"), and Vaimoke ("Surrogate Wife"). He appeared with actress/singer Birgit Kronström in the 1941 romantic comedy "Onnellinen ministeri" ("The Lucky Cabinet Minister"), which included the famous song "Katupoikien laulu", remade by other Finnish pop singers including Katri Helena.

== Life and career ==
Palo was born in Hämeenlinna as Tauno Brännäs, but changed his name to Tauno Palo in 1935. He was of partial Russian descent through his mother Olga Andersson (née Ivanoff) whose father was a Russian soldier and mother a Finnish maid. Palo recruited in the military and was educated as a chemist. His friend invited him to join the theatre of Working Men's Club in Sörnäinen. Theatre director and famous actor Aarne Orjatsalo became his mentor. The dark-haired lad from Sörnäinen who had a good voice got attention, and in 1931 he was invited to audition for film studios. His final breakthrough came when the era of silent films was over, and people could hear his voice.

Palo left his work as chemist in 1932. He was hired by the Finnish National Theatre, but until 1938 he got only small roles, because his popularity as a film star harmed his credibility on the stage.

Ansa Ikonen played as his leading lady in 12 films and in numerous plays and on tours. In the eyes of the public, they became the most romantic couple ever. In real life they did not have a romantic relationship.

Palo had in total over 300 roles on stage and played in 65 feature films.

Before the Second World War Palo recorded a number of songs from the musical films he acted in. He continued his recording career after 1967. He died in Helsinki.

== Selected filmography ==
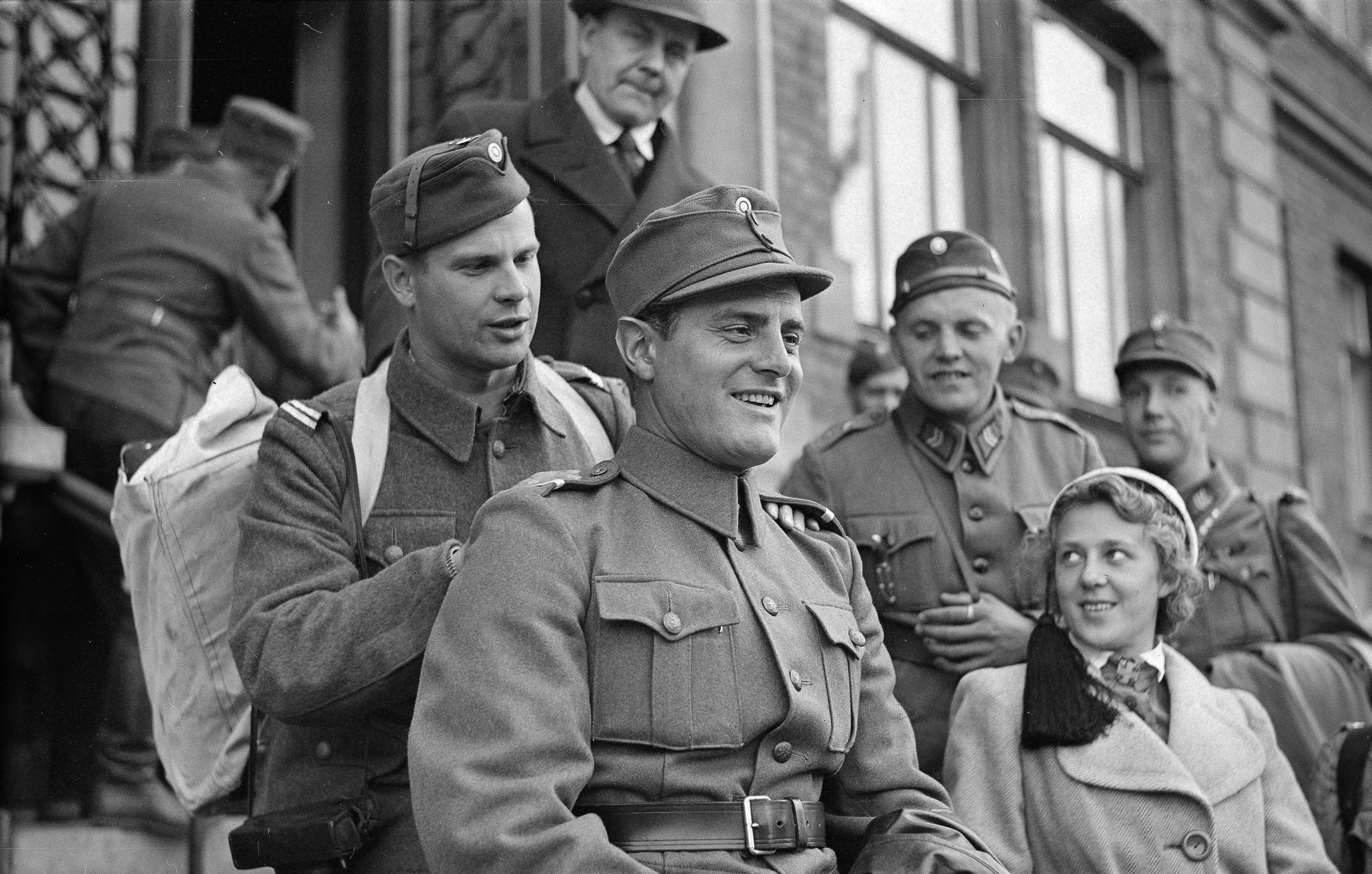
Tauno Paulo leaving for an entertainment tour in front during Continuation War

- Jääkärin morsian (1931) (as Tauno Brännas)
- Kaikki rakastavat (1935) ("Everybody's Love", romantic comedy)
- Vaimoke (1936) ("Surrogate Wife")
- The Rapids-Rider's Brides (1937)
- SF-paraati (1940) ("SF Parade", the first Finnish musical comedy)
- Kulkurin valssi (1941) ("The Vagabond's Waltz")
- Rosvo-Roope (1949) ("Rob the Robber")
- The Milkmaid (1953)
- Shamrock (1953)
- It Began in the Rain (1953)
- Hilma's Name Day (1954)
- The Unknown Soldier (1955)
- The Scarlet Dove (1961) – final film role

== Highlights on stage ==
- Anton Chekhov: Uncle Vanya (as Dr Astrov)
- Aleksis Kivi: Seitsemän veljestä (as Juhani)
- Henrik Ibsen: Doll house (as Dr Rank)
- Tennessee Williams: A Streetcar Named Desire (as Stanley)
- Georg Büchner: Danton's death (as Danton)
- Josef Julius Wecksell: Daniel Hjort (as Olavi)

== Selected discography ==
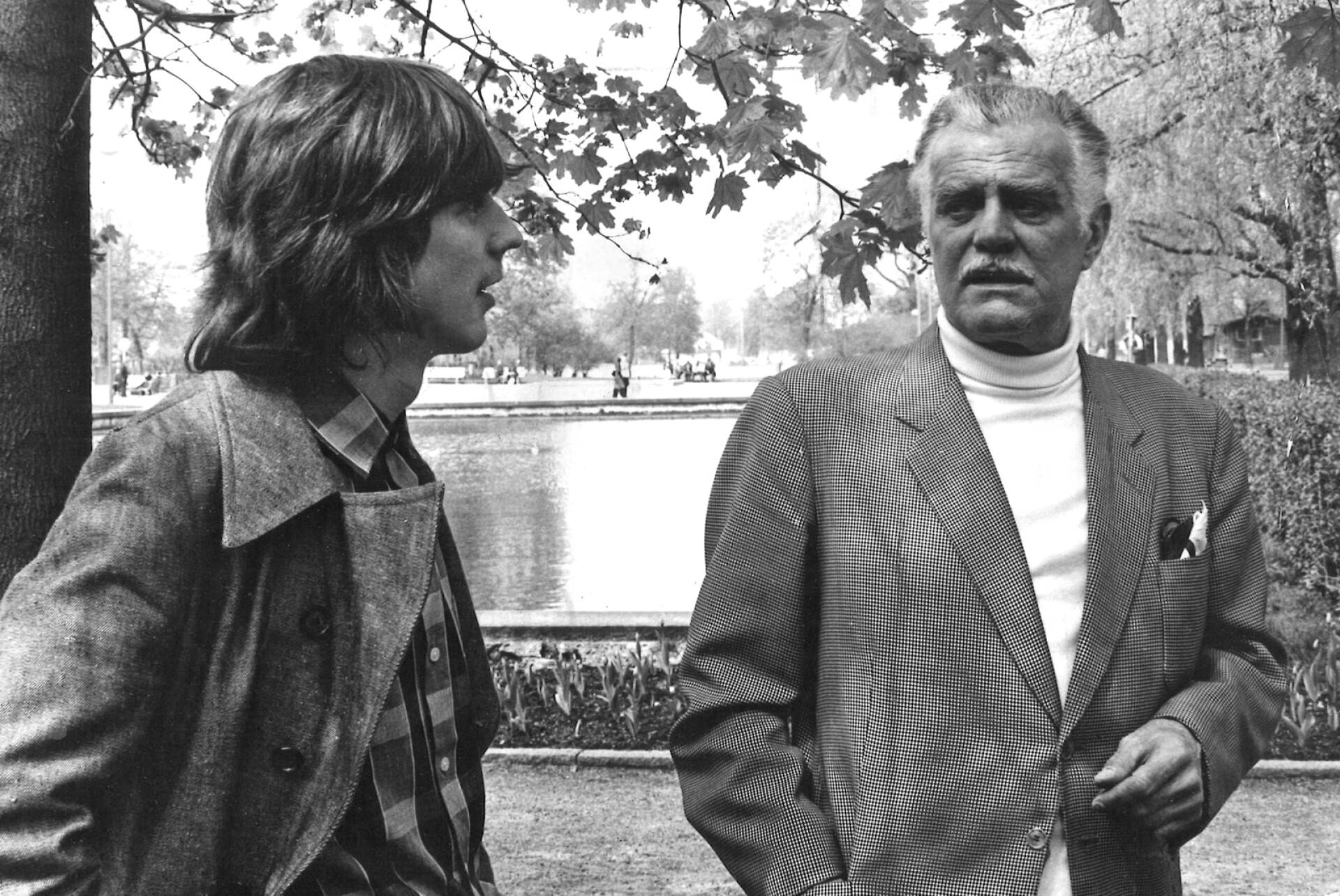
Olli Ikonen and Tauno Palo in 1972

- Tuulikki 1934 (Odeon A 228258) – a waltz
- Tuohinen sormus 1934 (Odeon A 228282) – a jenkka
- Syksyn tullessa 1935 (Odeon A 228327) – a waltz
- Mieheke 1936 (Odeon A 228359) – a jenkka
- Marjatta 1936 (Odeon A 228360) – a tango
- Sinä semmoinen, minä tämmöinen 1936 (Odeon 228370) – a jenkka
- Nuoruuden sävel 1940 (Odeon A 228590) from film SF-paraati
- Tauno Palo & Ansa Ikonen: Pot-pot-pot 1940 (Odeon A 228590) from film SF-paraati
- Näenhän valoisan taivaan 1940 (Odeon A 228615) from film SF-paraati
- Soittoniekka 1942 (Columbia DY 386) – a ballad
- Ruusu on punainen 1967 (RCA FAS 985) – comeback with a German schlager arranged by Aarno Raninen
- Rosvo-Roope 1968 (RCA EPS 222) – finally recorded melody from eponymous film
- Tauno Palo & Ansa Ikonen: Ansa & Tauno 1974 (Kiss RPLP 5007) – LP, including Kulkurin valssi
