= Ilmari Unho =

Finnish actor and director (1906–1961)

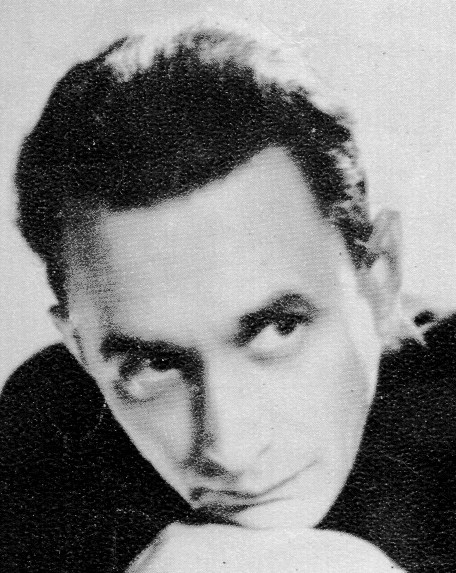
Ilmari Unho

Ilmari Unho (22 October 1906 − 3 April 1961) was a Finnish actor, film director, and screenwriter. Unho was employed by Suomi-Filmi for most of his filmmaking career.

Unho was born in Uusikaupunki in 1906. He started his film career as an actor in the 1925 film Pohjalaisia and also played roles in Meren kasvojen edessä (1926) and Kajastus (1930) during his early career. He worked as a theatre manager and journalist until 1938 when he was hired by Suomi-Filmi, a company he would stay with for the remainder of his career.

Initially, Unho worked as a screenwriter. He wrote the scripts for Jääkärin morsian (1938) and Aktivistit (1939), but quickly transitioned into the director's chair, with the comedies Punahousut (1939) and Kersantilleko Emma nauroi? (1940). During his career, Unho directed 26 films. Among the most important of these were the biopics of author Aleksis Kivi and opera singer Abraham Ojanperä, Minä elän (1946) and Ruusu ja kulkuri (1948). The film historian Peter von Bagh also lists Härmästä poikia kymmenen (1950), Pimeänpirtin hävitys (1947), Koskenkylän laulu (1947), and Kanavan laidalla (1949) among the director's most notable works. Unho usually wrote the screenplays for his own films and continued to write scripts for other directors throughout his career.

Unho was married to the actress Kaisu Leppänen from 1927 to 1930. Later on, he married another actress, Salli Karuna. Unho died in Pori in 1961, aged 54.

== Filmography ==
As a director:

- Punahousut (1939)
- Kersantilleko Emma nauroi? (1940)
- Poikani pääkonsuli (1940)
- Poretta eli keisarin uudet pisteet (1941)
- Neljä naista (1942)
- The Dead Man Falls in Love (1942)
- Syntynyt terve tyttö (1943)
- Miehen kunnia (1943)
- Kirkastettu sydän (1943)
- The Dead Man Loses His Temper (1944)
- Kartanon naiset (1944)
- Kolmastoista koputus (1945)
- Valkoisen neilikan velho (1945)
- Minä elän (1946)
- Pimeänpirtin hävitys (1947)
- Koskenkylän laulu (1947)
- Kilroy sen teki (1948)
- Ruusu ja kulkuri (1948)
- Kanavan laidalla Suomi (1949)
- Kalle-Kustaa Korkin seikkailut (1949)
- Härmästä poikia oli kymmenen (1950)
- Sadan miekan mies (1951)
- Kuisma ja Helinä (1951)
- "Jees, olympialaiset", sanoi Ryhmy (1952)
- Rengasmatka eli Peräkylän pikajuna (1952)
- Sillankorvan emäntä (1953)
