= Maunu Kurkvaara =

Finnish film director (1926–2023)

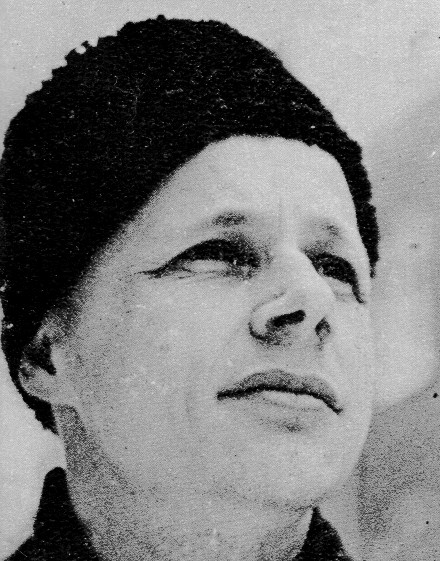
- Born: Mauno Sakari Heikkonen; 18 July 1926; Viipuri, Finland
- Died: 31 December 2023 (aged 97); Helsinki, Finland
- Occupations: Film director Screenwriter
- Years active: 1955–1993

Maunu Kurkvaara (18 July 1926 – 31 December 2023) was a Finnish film director and screenwriter. Kurkvaara has been widely regarded as the initiator of the "new wave" of Finnish cinema in the spirit of French New Wave cinema. He directed 22 films between 1955 and 1993. Many of his films share a nautical theme due to his love of the sea. His film Yksityisalue was entered into the 13th Berlin International Film Festival. In 1965, he co-produced the film 4x4 and it was entered into the 4th Moscow International Film Festival.

== Biography ==
From 1947 to 1951, he studied painting at the Finnish Academy of Arts, but already applied for the film industry in 1949, first as an organizer and assistant cameraman at Suomi-Film and then as an assistant to director Ville Salminen at a competing company, Oy Suomen Filmiteollisuus. In the winter of 1953, Kurkvaara worked as a studio manager in the ballet film Pessi and Illusia produced by Ralf Rubin.

Auteur style of Kurkvaara is characterized by the fact that he usually designed, produced, wrote, directed, shot and edited his films himself, which was unprecedented before in Finland. In most cases, his technical team comprised only the filming assistant in addition to himself. It is estimated that Kurkvaara's reluctance to hand over artistic control to others has been influenced by his previous background as a painter. He switched to film after suffering from tuberculosis, for which it was then that he began to receive effective medicine.

In the summer of 1954, Kurkvaara started making his debut feature film, Island of Happiness. Its filming was done mainly in Bornholm. In the summer of 1956, Kurkvaara filmed a new sequence for his film in Lahti, shortened the previous material and completely rebuilt the rest. Kurkvaara made his first distinctive tax reduction short films in 1955.

From 1958, Kurkvaara focused on feature films, starting with two based on Oiva Paloheimo's texts. His trilogy consisting of the films Dear ... (1961), Private Area (1962) and The Feast of the Sea (1963) about the loneliness of the modern man is considered Kurkavaara's most important work. The short film Pikkuinen, about his first daughter, Leija, received the FIM 10,000 state film prize at the first time. He received the state film award also between the years 1962-69 for Kurkvaara's five feature films.

Kurkvaara was also interested in the possibilities of color film, and in order to explore them, he founded his own color film laboratory, Kurkvaara-Film, in the early 1960s. The laboratory's operations were based on the assumption that the Finnish film industry and Fennada-Filmi, among others, would bring their color work to Kurkvaara in the future, but the 1963 actor's strike and the bankruptcy of the Finnish film industry watered down their intentions. In the early 1970s, Kurkvaara got tired of the politicization that had spread to the film industry, closed his laboratory, withdrew from film, and founded a boat sculpting business, among other things. Later in the 1980s, Kurkvaara returned to feature films twice more with The Taste of Success (1983) and Butterfly's Dream (1986).

Kurkvaara received Betoni-Jussi for his life's work at the Jussi Gala of the Year 2017.

Kurkvaara died on 31 December 2023, at the age of 97.

== Selected filmography ==
- Tweet, Tweet (Tirlittan, 1958)
- The Queen of Spades (Patarouva, 1959)
- Yksityisalue (1962)
- 4x4 (Nordisk kvadrille, 1965)
- The Gauntlet (Kujanjuoksu, 1971)
