= Heikki Aaltoila =

Finnish film composer and conductor

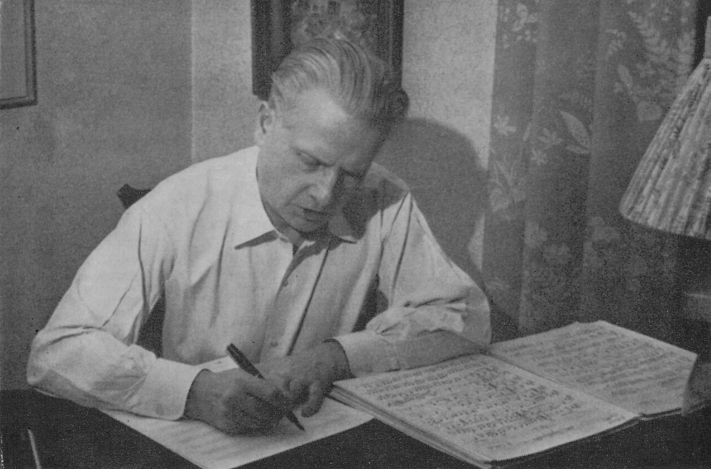
Heikki Aaltoila (1905–1992)

Heikki Aaltoila (11 December 1905 – 11 January 1992) was a Finnish film composer who served 40 years as the conductor of Finnish National Theatre's orchestra.

Aaltoila was born in Hausjärvi. His best known composition is a romantic waltz called Akselin ja Elinan häävalssi (Akseli's and Elina's wedding waltz) which originally belonged to the score of the film Here, Beneath the North Star (1968). He won the Jussi Award for best film score twice.

His other film compositions included music for Woman is the Wild Card (1944), Veteraanin voitto, Kvinnan bakom allt (1951), and Prinsessa Ruusunen (1949).

He died in Helsinki.
