= Minna Craucher =

Finnish socialite and spy

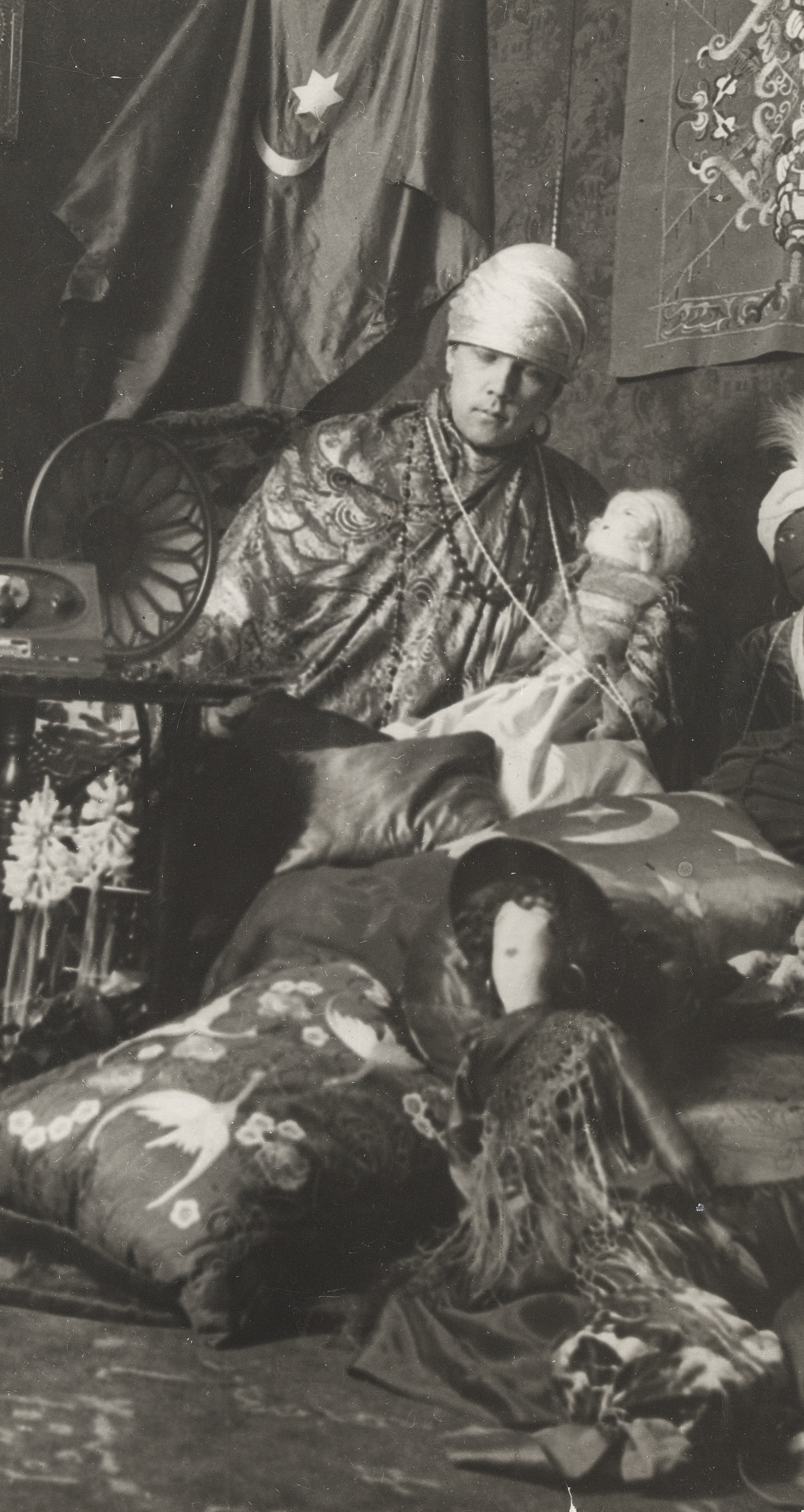
- Minna Craucher in her salon ca. 1927-1929
- Born: Minna Craucher; 23 August 1891; Pirkkala, Finland
- Died: 8 March 1932 (aged 40); Mechelininkatu 23 A, Helsinki, Finland
- Cause of death: Assassination by Olavi Runolinna
- Occupations: socialite; babysitter; magazine publisher and marketer; salon hostess
- Children: 2
- Espionage activity
- Allegiance: Soviet Cheka; Lapua Movement
- Service years: 1929–1932

Minna Craucher (23 August 1891 – 8 March 1932) was the pseudonym of Maria Vilhelmiina Lindell, a Finnish socialite and spy. Her home was a noted salon for various writers and artists. She also did espionage, originally for the Cheka, the Soviet secret police, and was arrested three times for fraud. She also had connections to the right-wing Lapua Movement. She became the subject of several books and stories. In 1932 she was murdered by Olavi Runolinna.

== Biography ==
=== Early years ===
Maria Vilhelmiina Lindell, originally from Aalto, was born in poor conditions in Pirkkala as the illegitimate child of a 16-year-old Nokia-born maid, Olga Aalto. Maria got a new surname from her stepfather Vilho Oskari Lindell. Maria's mother died on 29 August 1906, when Maria was only 15 years old. After living with relatives for some time, Maria, who became independent from an early age, moved to Tampere, after which she severed relations with her family. Maria did not have a permanent address and was a habitual thief, as a result she ended up dealing with the authorities several times, even being jailed for unpaid fines.

In 1913, Maria Lindell moved to Helsinki for the first time. Her first child died in 1908 within two weeks of its birth. She left her second child in Tampere for care. Accused of several thefts, Maria Lindell was imprisoned for the second time on 24 October 1914, and gave birth to a boy while serving her sentence. After being released from prison, Maria Lindell was taken to the women's shelter, Villa Elseboh, in Huopalahti, maintained by the Finnish Prison Association. According to Kari Selén, who wrote her biography, Lindell took advantage of the shelter, although at the same time she worked as a babysitter there. Lindell served her third and final prison sentence due to being convicted of thefts from 1920 to 1923. This prison period led to further changes: afterwards Maria Lindell became known as "Madame Minna Craucher" in various phases of her life.

=== "Madame Craucher" ===
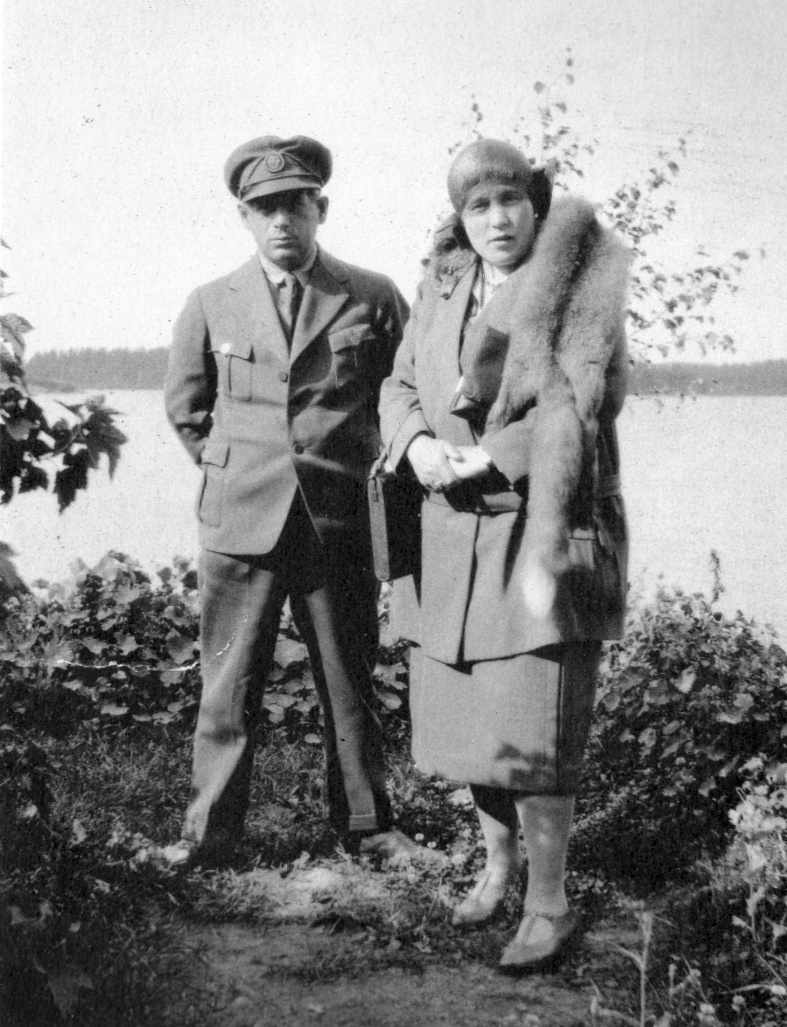
Madame Craucher (right) with her chauffeur Boris Wolkowski (left) in 1930s

Thanks to the "Madame Craucher" identity created with the help of her lively imagination and attraction, she probably appeared in the high society of Helsinki in the early spring of 1925. According to her story, she was a German noblewoman, a millionaire and a generous art lover. Finnish descent explained her proficiency in the Finnish language. Props used to substantiate her claims included a Willys Knight convertible from Stockmann paid with a down payment and a driver with a purported "Russian prince" in the background.

In 1925, Craucher met the 12 years younger Olavi Paavolainen, and was his mistress for several years. Together with journalist Ensio Svanberg, Craucher co-founded the "Entertainment and Travel Directory", a magazine that later became known as Seura (meaning "The Society") which was published in 1926–1929. The authors of the magazine included Kersti Bergroth, Pentti Haanpää, Martti Merenmaa, Elina Vaara, Väinö Nuorteva, and Mika Waltari, among others. The editors-in-chief were Yrjö Rauanheimo, Lauri Viljanen and Waltari. Craucher was the acquirer and marketer of the magazine's advertising space. As the magazine itself was not very popular, Craucher even resorted to blackmail in obtaining advertising contracts.

Craucher's salon was a popular gathering place for Tulenkantajat ("The Flame Bearers") and other young writers of the time because of her generous service and her fascinating persona. Of the authors who visited Craucher's salon, at least Joel Lehtonen, Martti Merenmaa and Mika Waltari have described the salon and its owner. The salon was located at Freesenkatu 4 A 3. The salon, or apartment Craucher, was bought by master builder K. E. Lund on 7 November 1924. The 47-square-meter apartment at that time was a modern type of apartment, a double apartment. The most striking part of it was the Turkish room. The colorful interior was softened by suitable lighting. The materials were stunning: oriental rugs all the way to the walls, brass tobacco tables and a large number of cushions to sit on. From Freesenkatu, Craucher later moved to Mechelininkatu 23 A 20.

=== In the Lapua Movement ===
When the Seura magazine ceased to be published in 1929, the focus of Craucher's activities shifted to officers and far right-wing politicians. According to Selén, young officers – like young writers – were exposed to Craucher's entertainment. Craucher herself, for her part, felt drawn to uniforms, according to the author of the biography. Craucher became involved in the right-wing Lapua Movement by first talking about herself as an advertiser for its Aktivisti magazine. Here she took advantage of fabricated recommendations from Marshal Mannerheim, among others.

Among other things, Craucher arranged and partially donated armbands for the participants of the Peasant March. Later, when Craucher had established close relations with the leaders of the movement, such as Vihtori Kosola, and gained influence, she began to be nicknamed "Captain of Lapua" or "Captain of Lapua Movement". Esko Riekki, the head of the Finnish Security Police, defined Craucher's role in the Lapua Movement in September 1930 as follows:

“I have heard that the Lapua Movement dare to drive Craucher away because she already knows too much.”

=== Death ===
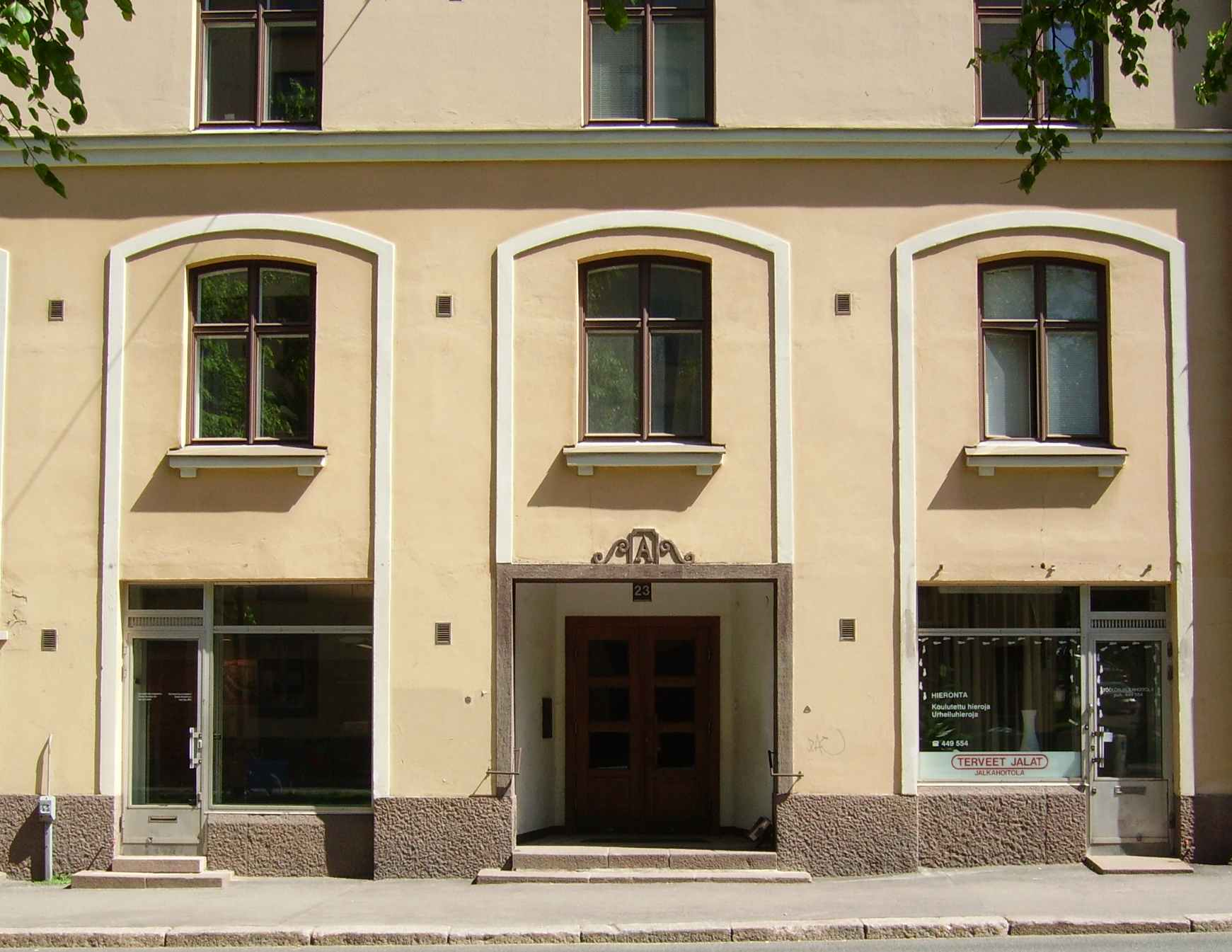
The stairwell of Minna Craucher's death place on Mechelininkatu in the summer 2006

Craucher became unpopular with the Lapua Movement and began to be suspected of being a communist agent. This was influenced by her covert background, which was revealed by the Finnish Security Police to the leadership of the Lapua Movement. Unpopularity was particularly fueled by the deep contradiction between the movement's general secretary, Martti Wallenius, and Craucher. Craucher can be said to have partially fulfilled the suspicions against her. However, the target was not the Communists but the Social Democrats. She told about the activities of the Lapua movement through Kalle Lehmus, the Suomen Sosialidemokraatti magazine. She also implied that she was in possession of a secret organization chart of the movement.

Possibly, Craucher's statement to Olavi Runolinna, economist and supporter of the Lapua Movement, about the threat of "changing sides" caused the unstable and drunk Runolinna to shoot Craucher to death in her apartment on 8 March 1932; initially, in a murder investigation conducted by the police, Martti Wallenius was considered the main suspect. Craucher's murder has been interpreted as part of the follow-up to the Mäntsälä rebellion. After her death, Esko Riekki wrote:

“She was just a ruthless blufferska and bonfångerska [bluffing woman and cheater] who enjoyed fiercely gaining fame: if the soul is immortal, C. now enjoys heavenly joy from this advertisement.”

== In popular culture ==
=== Fictional literature references related to Minna Craucher ===
- Joel Lehtonen: Rakastunut rampa (1922); a character named Mimmi Byskata is based on Craucher.
- Martti Merenmaa: Nousuvesi (1926); a character named Mrs. Pomaré is based on Craucher.
- Mika Waltari: Suuri illusioni (1928); a character named Mrs. Spindel is based on Craucher.
- Kjell Westö: Hägring 38 (2013)

== See also ==
- Ruben Oskar Auervaara
