= The Egyptian =

1945 novel by Finnish author Mika Waltari

- First edition cover (Finnish)
- Author: Mika Waltari
- Original title: Sinuhe egyptiläinen
- Language: Finnish
- Genre: Historical novel, bildungsroman, picaresque novel
- Publisher: WSOY
- Publication date: 1945
- Publication place: Finland
- English publication date: 1949
- Media type: Print (Hardback & Paperback)
- Pages: 785 pp (hardcover edition)
- ISBN: 1-55652-441-2 (English translation by Naomi Walford)
- OCLC: 49531238
- Dewey Decimal: 894/.54133 21
- LC Class: PH355.W3 S513 2002

The Egyptian (Sinuhe egyptiläinen, Sinuhe the Egyptian) is a historical novel by Mika Waltari. It was first published in Finnish in 1945, and in an abridged English translation by Naomi Walford in 1949, from Swedish rather than Finnish. (Note: Publisher WSOY has expressed their disappointment in many translations being based on this abridged English version. About a third of the text has been omitted. According to Faruk Abu-Chacra, "The English version has been harshly criticised because it has been heavily shortened and many key facts are missing." As of 2008 Naomi Walford's is the only English translation.) Regarded as "one of the greatest books in Finnish literary history", it is one of the most-translated Finnish works of literature, and is, so far, the only Finnish novel to be adapted into a Hollywood film, which happened in 1954.

The Egyptian is the first and the most successful of Waltari's great historical novels, and that which gained him international fame. The culmination of decades of research and coloured by Waltari observing World War II, it was written by him in the span of just around three months in 1945 and promptly became an international bestseller in the aftermath of the war. It is set in Ancient Egypt, mostly during the reign of Pharaoh Akhenaten of the 18th Dynasty, whom some have claimed to be the first monotheistic ruler in the world.

The novel is known for its high-level historical accuracy regarding the life and culture of the period depicted. At the same time, it also carries a pessimistic message of the essential sameness of flawed human nature throughout the ages.

== Summary ==
The protagonist of the novel is the fictional character Sinuhe, the royal physician, who tells the story in exile after Akhenaten's fall and death. Apart from incidents in Egypt, the novel charts Sinuhe's travels in then Egyptian-dominated Syria (Levant), in Mitanni, Babylon, Minoan Crete, and among the Hittites.

The main character of the novel is named after a character in an ancient Egyptian text commonly known as the Story of Sinuhe. The original story dates to a time long before that of Akhenaten: texts are known from as early as the 12th dynasty.

Supporting historical characters include the old Pharaoh Amenhotep III and his conniving favorite wife, Tiy; the wife of Akhenaten, Nefertiti; the listless young Tutankhamun (King Tut), who succeeded as Pharaoh after Akhenaten's downfall; and the two common-born successors who were, according to this author, integral parts of the rise and fall of the Amarna heresy of Akhenaten: the priest, vizier and later Pharaoh Ay and the warrior-general and then finally Pharaoh, Horemheb. Though never appearing onstage, throughout the book the Hittite King Suppiluliuma I appears as a brooding threatening figure of a completely ruthless conqueror and tyrannical ruler. Other historical figures with whom the protagonist has direct dealings are: Aziru (ruler of Amurru kingdom), Thutmose (sculptor), Burna-Buriash II (Babylonian king), and, under a different name ("Shubattu"), Zannanza, son of Suppiluliuma I. Princess Baketamon is a collage of several historical figures: herself, sister of Akhenaten; Zannanza's bride-to-be, a widow queen of Egypt; and Mutnedjmet, royal wife of Horemheb. Historical Horemheb and Mutnedjmet had no son.

=== Plot ===
Sinuhe recounts, in his old age at his location of forced exile by the Red Sea coast, the events of his life. His tone expresses cynicism, bitterness and disappointment; he says humans are vile and will never change, and that he's writing down his story for therapeutic reasons alone and for something to do in the rugged and desolate desert landscape.

Sinuhe begins his life as a foundling discovered in a reed boat in the Nile, and grows up in the poor part of Thebes. His adoptive father Senmut is a doctor, and Sinuhe decides to walk in his footsteps. As an assistant to a royal doctor who knows his adoptive father, Sinuhe is allowed to visit the court, during a trepanation on the dying Amenhotep III – here Sinuhe, the young crown prince Akhenaten and Horemheb meet for the first time. Well educated, Sinuhe sets up a clinic and acquires the sly and eloquent slave Kaptah, who will be his companion and close friend throughout his life.

One day he gets acquainted with the gorgeous woman Nefernefernefer and is bewitched by her. Nefernefernefer gets Sinuhe to give her everything he owns – even his adoptive parents' house and grave. When the woman has realised that Sinuhe has run out of possessions, she gets rid of him. Ashamed and dishonored, Sinuhe arranges his adoptive parents to be embalmed and buries them in the Valley of the Kings (they had taken their lives before eviction), after which he decides to go to exile in the company of Kaptah to Levant, which was under Egyptian rule at the time.

In Syria, his medical skill earns him fame and wealth. During an Egyptian military operation in Syria, he re-encounters Horemheb, serving as a military commander. From this, Sinuhe is commissioned to travel at his expense in the known world to determine what military potential the established nations have.

Sinuhe, in company of Kaptah, travels first to Babylon where he engages in science and socializes with the city's scholars. One day he is summoned to the sick king Burraburiash, whom he manages to cure. Soon Kaptah is selected for the traditional day of the false king, where the city's greatest fool is king for a day and then killed. A young Cretan woman named Minea has been recently acquired to the king's harem against her will; during a feast, Sinuhe, in the process of falling in love with her, smuggles Minea and Kaptah from the palace and flees with the two to the neighboring country Mitanni. From there they proceed to Anatolia and to the fast-growing Hittite empire. Sinuhe and his companions feel unhappy about the militarism and tough rule of law that characterize the kingdom of the Hittites, and they decide to leave Anatolia and sail to Crete, Minea's homeland.

Minea has grown up with the mission to sacrifice herself as a virgin to the local bull god who lives in a mountain cave at the sea. Sinuhe is horrified by this and fears that he will not see her again. In the evening before Minea should enter the mountain cave, they marry each other unofficially. A while after Minea has been escorted into the mountain cave, Sinuhe enters the cave in search for her. He finds Minea's dead body and the remains of the Cretan god (described as a bull-headed sea serpent), and realises that she has been killed by the god's high priest Minotaurus to prevent her from returning and telling the god is dead. Sinuhe loses his mind from grief, but Kaptah eventually succeeds in calming him down and convinces him that it's best to move on and return to Syria.

In Syria, Sinuhe returns to medical profession and regains his previous status. He notices, however, that the Egyptian sovereignty in the area has now begun to be questioned and threatened. This rebellious mood is triggered not in the least by the Syrian, Hittite-friendly Prince Aziru, whom Sinuhe still befriends, among other things, through a medical assignment.

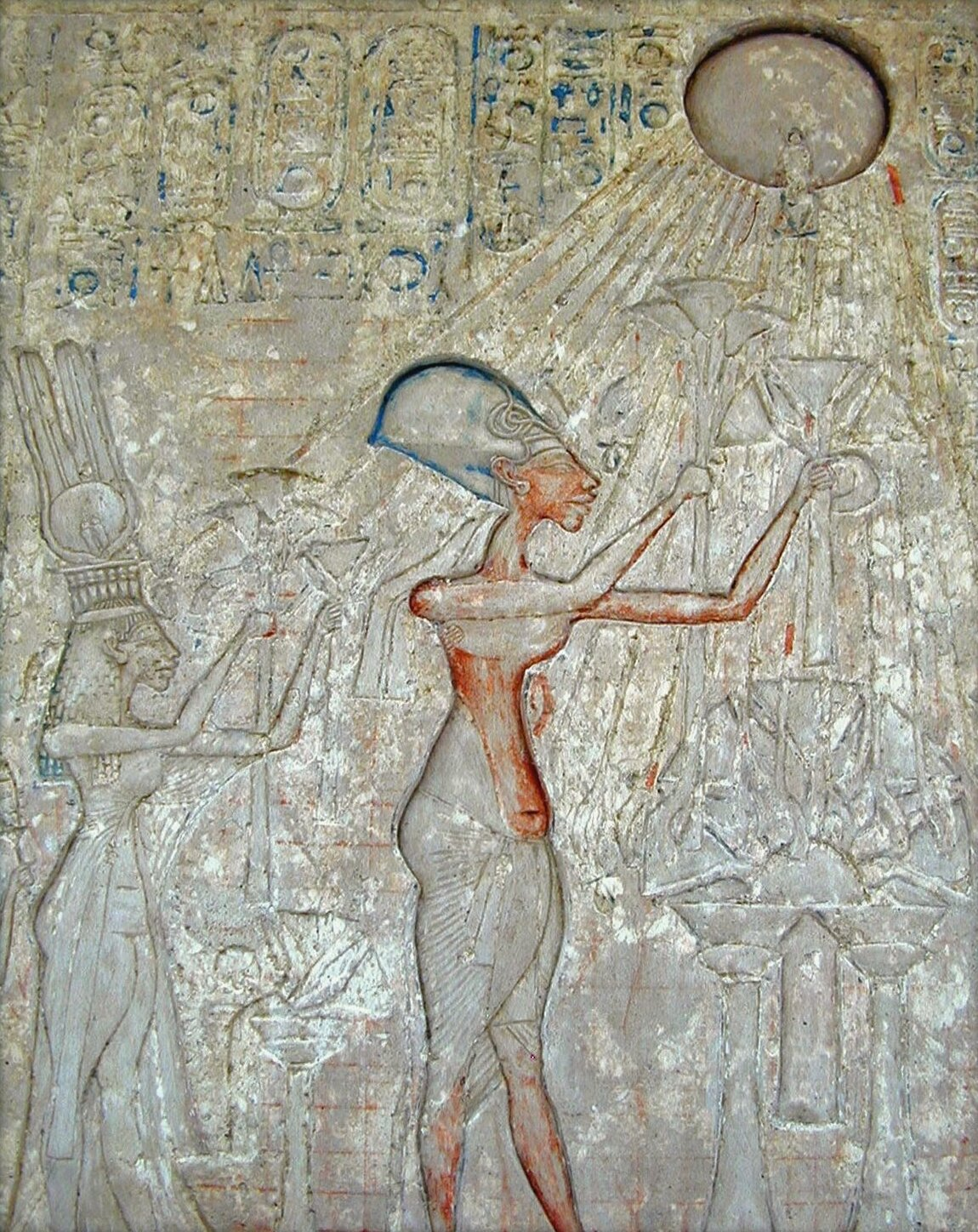
Pharaoh Akhenaten with his family worshipping the solar disc Aten. In the novel, Akhenaten seeks to bring about a utopia with his new religion.

One day Sinuhe decides to return to Egypt. He sails to Thebes and opens a clinic for the poor in the same neighborhood he grew up in. He does not get rich in this, being driven by ideological motives instead. His slave Kaptah (now released by Sinuhe) instead becomes a businessman and buys a pub called "Crocodile's Tail". There Sinuhe meets a woman named Merit, who becomes Sinuhe's life partner.

In Egypt, a new king, Akhenaten, has begun to convey a monotheistic teaching centered around the sun god Aten. According to Akhenaten's doctrine, all people are equal, and in the new world order there no longer would be slaves and masters. Aspects of Akhenaten prove to be unpopular: his pacifism, among Horemheb and others concerned with the threat of Syrian and Hittite invasion; his attempts at redistributing property to the poor; and his worship of Aten at the exclusion of the old gods, among the clergy of the mighty state god Amon. Sinuhe is attracted to the teachings that the new king proclaims and, as he feels, focus on light, equality and justice, and joins Akhenaten's court.

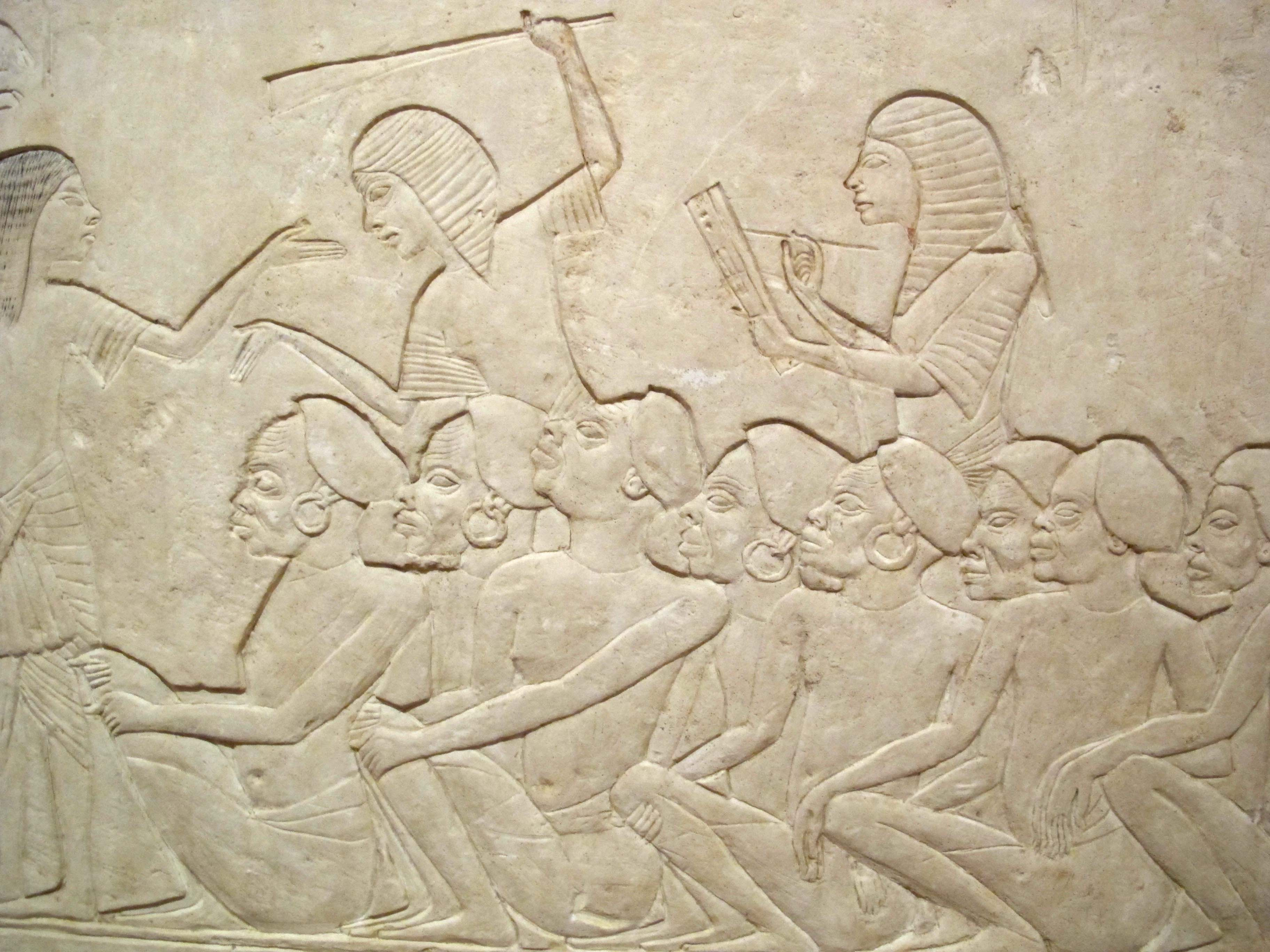
War prisoners from Horemheb's time as the commander of the army

After a particularly violent public incident, Akhenaten, fed up with opposition, leaves Thebes with Sinuhe to middle Egypt where a new capital, Akhetaten, dedicated to Aten, is built. However, the conflicts between Amon and Aten continue, and it all develops into a civil war. Aten's kingdom on Earth begins to fall, and the courtiers, one after another, abandon Aten and Akhetaten in favor of Amon and Thebes. The final battle also takes place in Thebes. Sinuhe fights for the sake of Aten and Akhenaten to the end, but ultimately the side of the Amon priesthood is victorious. During the chaos, Merit and her son Thot are killed – the latter would turn out to be Sinuhe's offspring. When defeat has become reality, Akhenaten dies after drinking a cup of poison mixed by the embittered Sinuhe. Queen Nefertite's father, Ay, takes the throne, after the boy king Tutankhamun's short reign, despite Sinuhe having realised from Tiy that he himself is of royal blood and must be the son of Amenhotep III and his Mitannic consort, and thus closer to the throne.

With Akhenaten out of the way, Horemheb gathers all fit men and conducts a full-scale war against the Hittite kingdom – Egypt's premier rival at this time. Both Sinuhe and Kaptah participate in this battle, as Sinuhe wanted to know what war is like. A peace treaty is ultimately established, and king Aziru and his royal family are captured and publicly executed. Sinuhe later succeeds with Horemheb's and Ay's mission to assassinate the Hittite prince Shubattu, secretly invited by Baketamon to marry her, preventing him from reaching Egypt and seizing the throne.

Sinuhe now goes back, afflicted by all the losses, to a simple dwelling in Thebes, bitter and disillusioned in the heart. Every now and then he is visited by his former servant Kaptah, who only becomes richer and richer, and is now Sinuhe's patron. Sinuhe begins to criticise the new regime led by his old friend Horemheb, and as a punishment for this he is exiled to the Red Sea coast.

== Writing process ==
=== Research and background ===
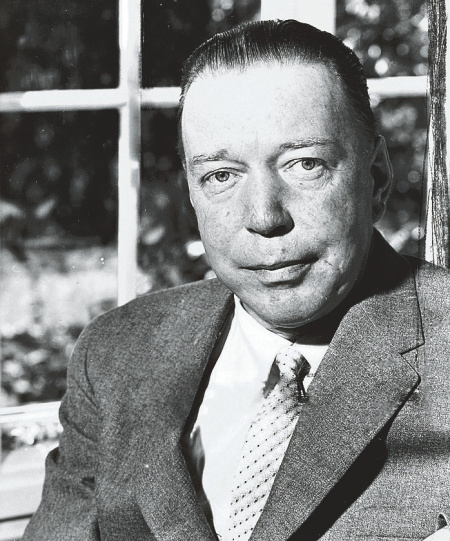
Mika Waltari, author of The Egyptian

Although Waltari employed some poetic license in combining the biographies of Sinuhe and Akhenaten, he was otherwise much concerned about the historical accuracy of his detailed description of ancient Egyptian life and carried out considerable research into the subject. Waltari's fascination of ancient Egypt was sparked as a 14-year-old by the 1922 discovery of Tutankhamun, which became widely publicised and a cultural phenomenon at the time. On his trips to foreign countries he would always first visit the local egyptological exhibitions and museums. Waltari didn't make notes, instead preferring to internalise all this vast knowledge; this allowed him to interweave his accumulated information smoothly into the story. The result has been praised not only by readers but also by Egyptologists.

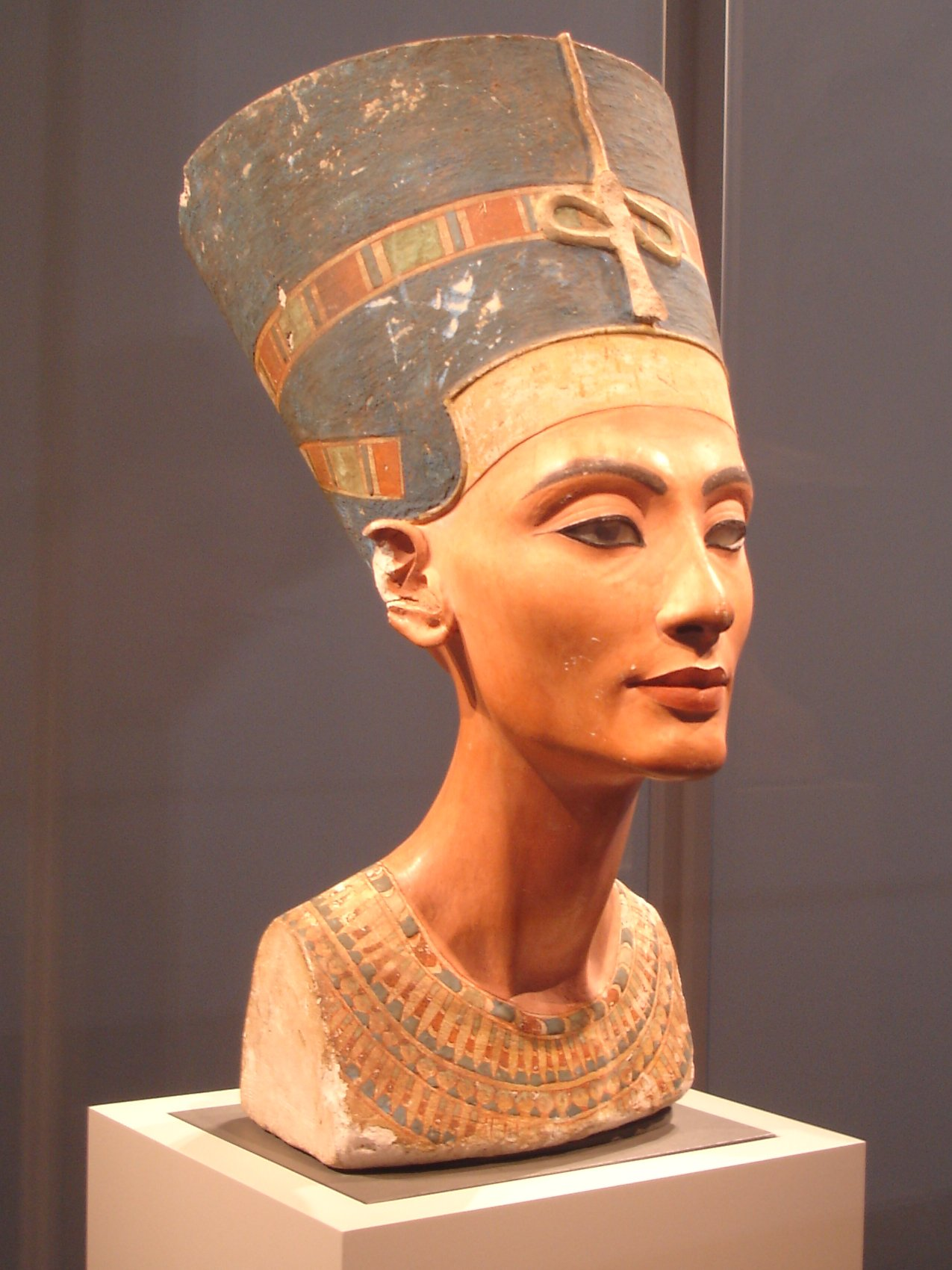
The bust of Nefertiti left a profound impression on Waltari: "It wasn't until '38 when I saw Nefertiti's original statue in the museum of Berlin – this extraordinary sophistication, which includes in addition to beauty all the possibilities of a woman, all the way to treason. In fact, this whole Nefertiti image transformed only upon seeing this character live." (Note: Finnish: "Vasta '38 näin siis sen Nefertitin alkuperäispatsaan Berliinin museossa, tämän tavattoman hienostuneisuuden, johon siis sisältyvät kauneuden lisäksi kaikki naisen mahdollisuudet petosta myöten. Itse asiassa koko Nefertitin kuva muuttui vasta nähdessäni elävänä tämän hahmon.")

Waltari had long been interested in Akhenaten and wrote a play about him, Akhnaton, auringosta syntynyt (Akhnaton, Born of the Sun), which was published in 1936. In it, Waltari explored the disastrous consequences of Akhenaten's well-intentioned implementation of unconditional idealism in a society, and referenced the tensions at the borders of the Egyptian empire which resemble those on the Soviet-Finnish frontier. Waltari would later revisit these themes, which only had a minor role in the play, in greater depth in The Egyptian. The character of Sinuhe makes no appearance in this play.

With the advent of World War II, Waltari's idealism crumbled and was replaced with cynicism; this was in no small part due to him serving as a propagandist during the Winter War and Continuation War at the State Information Bureau, causing him to realise how much historical information is actually relative or made of half-truths. Waltari also witnessed Finland's sudden, perfidious change of policy towards the USSR from "enemy" to "friend" upon the signing of the armistice on 4 September 1944, another ideal shattered. The war provided the final impulse for exploring the subjects of Akhenaten and Egypt in a novel which, although depicting events that took place over 3,300 years ago, in fact reflects the contemporary feelings of disillusionment and war-weariness and pessimistically illustrates how little the essence of humanity has changed since then. The political and battle depictions of ancient Egypt and surrounding nations contain many parallels with World War II. The threatening King Suppiluliuma has many of the overtones of Hitler. Waltari often said that the novel would have been a very different one had it not been for World War II.

=== The writing ===
In April 1945 Waltari travelled to his mother-in-law's cottage in Hartola, where he began writing in the attic. The experiences of war and 20 years of research had pushed him into a state where the novel burst out of him: The novel was written within a three and a half-month period of great inspiration, with Waltari producing as many as between 15 and 27 sheets per day. So intense was his state of inspiration and immersion that, in a fictionalised account called A Nail Merchant at Nightfall he would write later, he claimed to have been visited by visions of Egyptians and to have simply transcribed the story as dictated by Sinuhe himself. He repeated the same story four decades later in Kirjailijan muistelmia. This has caused some to speculate that Waltari in fact had been an Egyptian in a prior life or was a reincarnation of Sinuhe. Waltari followed a consistent schedule, writing from 9 AM to 4 or 5 PM, meal breaks at predetermined times, family members leaving him to his work. A state of happiness and being in love during creative work was essential to Waltari, and on evenings he wrote long love letters to one Helena Kangas (later known as Leena Ilmari) throughout the summer. Waltari's extramarital relationships were no danger to his marriage, as he and his wife Marjatta had developed a mutual understanding regarding these matters and Waltari would always remain loyal to her in the end. His mother died during this; his wife managed the funeral arrangements, Waltari attended the funeral, and on the next morning he resumed writing the novel where he left off.

The completed manuscript, totaling almost one thousand pages, was delivered by Waltari to WSOY in the first half of August 1945. Editor Jalmari Jäntti had typically cut risqué material from Waltari's prior works. This time, however, little to no corrections or deletions were required by the editor – it went on to be printed as it was on the same month.

== Themes ==
=== Unchanging humanity ===
Even were the time to come when there would be neither poor nor rich, yet there will always be wise and stupid, sly and simple, for so there have ever been and ever will be. The strong man sets his foot on the neck of the weakling; the cunning man runs off with the simpleton’s purse and sets the dunce to work for him. Man is a crooked dealer and even his virtue is imperfect. Only he who lies down never to rise again is wholly good. (Note: Finnish: "Jos tulisikin aika, jolloin enää ei ole rikkaita eikä köyhiä, niin aina on olemassa viisaita ja tyhmiä, ovelia ja yksinkertaisia. Niin on aina ollut ja niin on oleva. Väkevä panee jalkansa heikon niskalle ja ovela vie tyhmän kukkaron ja panee yksinkertaisen tekemään työtä puolestaan, sillä ihminen on petollinen eläin ja hänen hyvyytensäkin on puolinainen, niin että vasta mies, joka makaa pitkällään eikä enää nouse, on kokonaan hyvä.")

— excerpt encapsulating the theme of repeated history

Central to the novel's themes is the conviction of the unchanging nature of mankind, exemplified by the recurring phrase "so there has ever been and ever will be". (Note: Finnish: "Niin on ollut ja niin on aina oleva") Its view on humanity is reputedly grim, displaying human failings such as selfishness, greed and prejudice as widespread. Waltari has gone on to state: "Although the basic characteristics of a human being can not change in the foreseeable time-frame due to the fact that they have 10000, 100000, 200000 years old inherited instincts as their basis, people's relationships can be altered and must be altered, so that the world can be saved from destruction." (Note: Finnish: "Vaikka ihmisen perusominaisuudet eivät nähtävissä olevien aikojen puitteissa voi muuttua, koska niillä on kymmentuhat-, satatuhat-, kaksisataatuhatta vuotta vanhat periytyvät vaistot pohjanaan, niin ihmisten välisiä suhteita voidaan muuttaa, täytyykin muuttaa, jotta maailma voisi pelastua tuhoutumisesta.")

Commenting on the prevalence of this interpretation, Finnish literary scholar Markku Envall views that the novel's main thesis is not simply that people can not change, but rather that it contains a contradiction that nothing can change and everything can change; on some levels things remain the same, but on other levels the hope of future change survives in the novel.

Envall brings up the "familiarity" of the depiction of 14th-century BC Egypt as highly developed: the novel describes phenomena – inventions, knowings, institutions etc. – that, although resembling familiar modern day equivalents that are rather new in Finland, are nonetheless egyptologically accurate. The similarity between ancient and modern times supports the themes of changelessness, and is in an "effective" tension with the archaic-style language. "The narration estranges the phenomena by portraying them as simultaneously archaic and timeless, alien and familiar," (Note: Finnish: "Kerronta vieraannuttaa ilmiöt näyttämällä ne samanaikaisesti arkaaisina ja ajattomina, outoina ja tuttuina.") he writes. As examples of these cultural parallels, Envall lists: the pseudo-intellectuals exalt themselves by flaunting their usage of foreign loanwords; the language of Babylon is the common language of the learned throughout various countries (like Greek in the Hellenistic period, Latin in the medieval period, French among diplomats and English in the 20th and 21st centuries); education takes place in faculties that provide degrees for qualification in posts (European universities began in the Middle Ages); people have addresses and send mail as papyrus and clay tablets; censorship is circumvented by cloaking subjects with historical stand-ins. There are precursors to aspects of modern medicine and monetary economy as well.

Similar themes are expressed via repetition throughout the novel, such as: everything is futile, the tomorrow is unknowable, no one can know why something has always been so, all people are fundamentally the same everywhere, the world year is changing, and death is better than life.

=== Clash of ideologies ===
Markku Envall describes the work as a criticism of utopism, the advocation of an ideology or idealism while ignorant of the world where it is supposed to be realized. Idealistic and materialistic worldviews are at clash in the novel, the former represented by the pacifist pharaoh Akhenaten and latter by the cold-bloodedly realist warlord Horemheb – idealism and realism are similarly represented also by Sinuhe and Kaptah, respectively. This tension is played out in a world concerned chiefly with worldly matters and rampant with prejudiced attitudes and lust for material possessions, wealth and power. Akhenaten is an illustration of the destructiveness of well-intentioned blindness; he is a tragic character and this blindness is his tragic flaw, by which he causes the destruction of his own kingdom – much like King Lear. The protagonist Sinuhe is an open-minded, learning and developing character, the sole such one in the novel according to Envall. Through him, the worldviews represented by other characters are experienced and evaluated, and during his character arc he is able to internalise much of these aspects, combining idealism and realism. Although Horemheb is able to reinstate peace and order, rebuilding that which Akhenaten destroys, his ingenious realpolitik is rejected by Sinuhe, because it also abolishes freedom. Whether suffering is increased or decreased during Horemheb's reign is left ambiguous, however. Envall constructs the following graph:

	idealism	realism
state	Akhenaten	Horemheb
individual	Sinuhe	Kaptah

He argues that "whole" individuals are achieved by combining these "partial" ones: a good ruler by combining Akhenaten and Horemheb, and an individual capable of surviving through everyday life by combining Sinuhe and Kaptah. Sinuhe is dependent on Kaptah's street-smartness and life experience, and they are inseparable to such an extent that in Kaptah's absence Sinuhe is forced to imagine his voice.

=== Allegory of Christianity ===
Aten

The portrayal of Atenism, as a doctrine advocating peace and equality, has attracted readings as an allegory of the attempted rise of an early form of Christianity. Markku Envall finds many resemblances between phrases uttered by Jesus and the apostles in the New Testament, and those by characters in The Egyptian (especially in context of Atenism). He argues that by this Waltari anachronistically utilizes literature from after the story's setting, and that it demonstrates the parallelism of the two religions: both religions are prophetic (a single informant), noninstitutional (to experience God, the believer does not necessarily require an intermediary infrastructure), egalitarian (before God, secularly unequal people are equal) and universal (meant for all humanity). As reasons for these similarities, Envall explains that firstly, the religions of Egypt were a major influence on Judaism and hence Christianity, and secondly, that the religions share common archetypical material.

=== Relationship to Ecclesiastes ===
Ecclesiastes was an influence, both stylistically and thematically. A device Waltari uses to emphasise a theme is the "chorus" – the reiteration of an idea. On the first page Sinuhe states: "Everything returns to what it was, and there is nothing new under the Sun, and man never changes". (Note: Finnish: "Kaikki palaa ennalleen eikä mitään uutta ole auringon alla eikä ihminen muutu") Shortly afterwards, the opposite of this idea is denied: "There are also those, who say that which has happened has never before happened, but this is useless talk." (Note: Finnish: "Myös on niitä, jotka sanovat, ettei sellaista, mikä on tapahtunut, ole milloinkaan ennen tapahtunut, mutta tämä on turhaa puhetta.") This thesis is repeated by multiple other characters as well. The main thesis is borrowed from Ecclesiastes:

What has been will be again,
what has been done will be done again;
there is nothing new under the sun. (Ecclesiastes 1:9)

Like The Egyptian, Ecclesiastes strengthens the idea by denying its opposite:

Is there anything of which one can say,
"Look! This is something new"?
It was here already, long ago;
it was here before our time. (Ecclesiastes 1:10)

Other shared themes are the futility of everything, and the suffering brought by knowledge. Conversely however, Sinuhe's preference of death over life is the antithesis of Ecclesiastes' love of life over death.

=== World War II allegory ===
The geopolitical map of the Middle East during the first half of 14th century BC

The geopolitical situation of the Middle East, as depicted by the novel, is thought to represent the second world war. Waltari reluctantly approved this interpretation. These analogies are not exact but suggestive in nature; they are split up and mixed up, hidden among a vast amount of reliable historical knowledge. The relations between nations of the two time periods look as follows:

- Land of the Hittites / Germany
- Babylon / Soviet Union
- Mitanni / Poland
- Crete / France
- Egypt / England

The similarities between the warlike Hittites and Nazi Germany include their Lebensraum project, fast sudden warfare or Blitzkrieg, use of propaganda to weaken the enemy, and worship of health and power while disdaining the sickly and weak. Mitanni is a border and buffer nation between the land of the Hittites and Babylon, like Poland between Germany and the USSR. Akhenaten's and Horemheb's battle for power mirrors the opposition of Neville Chamberlain and Winston Churchill; the former seeks peace by conceding lands to the invader but helps the enemy, whereas the latter knows that war is the only way to save the home country.

== Historical accuracy ==
The novel's reputation of historical flawlessness has been often repeated, by the egyptological congress of Cairo, French egyptologist Pierre Chaumelle, and U. Hofstetter of The Oakland Post. In 2008 Richard B. Parkinson, the director and the curator of the Egyptian department of the British Museum, called it a "serious intellectual achievement" and that it "depicts a culture of real human beings in a way achieved by few other novels". Waltari has been mistaken for an egyptologist. He never visited Egypt, because he feared it would ruin his mental image of Egypt and modern Egypt was completely different from the ancient one. He has said: "I have lived in Egypt although I have never visited the place." (Note: Finnish: "Olen elänyt Egyptissä, vaikka en ole käynyt siellä.")

Nonetheless, Markku Envall cautions that the novel cannot be taken as absolutely free of errors on a literal level. A Swiss scholar complained that a sand flea species mentioned did not exist in Africa until it migrated via slave ships. Rostislav Holthoer has doubted the historicity of the depiction of trepanation prominent in the novel, and the act of abandoning newborns in reed boats. He has not been able to confirm nor deny some specific manners or traditions, such as breaking vases to conduct marriage, but the majority of religious ones are real. Even the day of the false king has its basis on reality, with ancient Babylonians killing a surrogate king to save their real king should he have been prophesied to die. On the other hand, he has given Waltari credit for his predictions, as later discoveries have confirmed dubious details of the novel. Waltari's unflattering characterisation of Akhenaten, Horemheb, Tiy and Ay as flawed persons proved to be closer to reality than their earlier glorification. Research at Long Island University has supported Tutankhamun having been murdered, as hinted in the novel. Some have doubted the possibility of an ancient Egyptian person writing a text for oneself only, but in 1978 such a papyrus became public; its author, a victim of wrongdoing, tells his life story in it with no recipient. According to Jussi Aro, the real Hittites were seemingly less cruel and stern than other peoples of the Middle East and the day of the false king was misdated among other errors, although Panu Rajala dismisses his claims as alternative readings of evidence rather than outright contradictions. Markku Envall argues that the accuracy or lack thereof is irrelevant to a fictional work's literary merit, citing the errors of Shakespeare.

== Reception ==
The messages of the novel evoked a wide response in readers in the aftermath of the World War, and the book became an international bestseller. As of 2024, The Egyptian has been translated into 40 or 41 languages; it's the most internationally famous and translated Finnish novel, yet in 2009 100 Must-read Historical Novels estimated that "its fame has faded in recent decades". Still, new translations continue to be made into the 2020s.

=== First publication ===
The Egyptian was first published in late November 1945. Initially knowledge of the novel spread through word of mouth in Finland; WSOY hadn't advertised it due to concerns over erotic content. It gained some early notoriety through an incident by historical novelist Maila Talvio: after hearing lewd sections read out beforehand in an autumn 1945 literature event, she took offense, marched into WSOY's office and demanded that the novel's printing be stopped, even in vain offering to buy the whole edition when told the printing machines were already in full action. The first two editions were sold out by the end of the year, and it became one of the most discussed topics in societal and literary circles.

The few reviews before the end of the year were positive: Huugo Jalkanen of Uusi Suomi and Lauri Viljanen of Helsingin Sanomat said that the novel was no mere colourful retelling of history, but was relevant to the current attitude shaped by the events of recent years. More reviews followed in January, and a common element among the more negative or lukewarm reviews was the scolding of Waltari's previous work, but many saw it as a turning point for his career. The sexual depictions drew ire. Eino Sormunen of Savon Sanomat recommended discretion due to plenitudes of horrifying decadence at display, and Vaasan Jaakkoo of Ilkka warned about it as unsuitable for children. Yrjö Tönkyrä of Kaiku wrote: "Not wanting to appear in any way as a moralist, I nonetheless cannot ignore the erotic gluttony that dominates the work, as if conceived by a sick imagination – the whole world revolves for the sole purpose that people can enjoy..." (Note: Finnish: "Tahtomatta lainkaan esiintyä minään moralistina en kuitenkaan voi olla kiinnittämättä huomiota teosta hallitsevaan kuin sairaan mielikuvituksen luomaan eroottiseen mässäilyyn – koko maailma pyörii vain sitä varten että ihmiset voivat iloita...")

French egyptologist Pierre Chaumelle read The Egyptian in Finnish and, in a letter featured in a Helsingin Sanomat article in 13. 8. 1946, wrote of his impressions:

"I shall with utmost sincerity attest that I haven't read anything as remarkable in a long time. The book is indeed a work of art, its language and effects fit splendidly with the French language, it contains not a single tasteless nor crude spot nor archaeological error. Its word order, language, closely resembles the language of Egypt, and it would be a crime to translate it with less care than what it has been written with." (Note: Finnish: "Mitä vilpittömimmin vakuutan, etten ole lukenut mitään yhtä huomattavaa pitkiin aikoihin. Kirja on tosiaankin taideteos, sen kieli ja efektit sopivat mainiosti ranskan kieleen, siinä ei ole ainoatakaan mautonta tai raakaa kohtaa tai arkeologista erehdystä. Sen sanajärjestys, kieli on lähellä egyptin kieltä, ja olisi rikos kääntää se vähemmällä huolella kuin millä se on kirjoitettu." Abridged from the original.)

Critics had been concerned that Waltari might have played fast and loose with historical events, but this article dispelled these doubts and begot a reputation of almost mythical accuracy around the novel. This lack of errors was also confirmed by the egyptological congress of Cairo, and egyptologist Rostislav Holthoer also has since then noted that later research has confirmed some of Waltari's speculations.

=== First translations ===
The Swedish translation by Ole Torvalds was published in late 1946, abridged with Waltari's approval. Torvalds was careful not to omit anything essential while streamlining the pacing. Waltari praised the result. In 1948 a complete French version came out, as well as Danish and Norwegian versions. The novel sold one million copies in Europe within the first five years after its publication.

The Egyptian saw an English release in August 1949. Putnam had asked a Swedish woman of culture (coincidentally the wife of an editor who'd previously rejected the novel) for input, and she had urged them to publish it. It was translated by Naomi Walford, not directly from Finnish but rather Swedish, and abridged even further at the behest of the aforementioned Swede, the same also hired to abridge it. About a third of the text was lost: aside from the excision of repetitions, the philosophical content suffered and key facts were omitted.

Edmund Fuller of The Saturday Review described the narrative as "colorful, provocative, completely absorbing"; he compared it to Thomas Mann's Joseph and His Brothers, writing: "Again, Mann's great work is a study of ideas and of personality. The Egypt emergent from his formidable style is shown within a limited social range and is detailed only in isolated scenes. If there are deeps of the personality that Mann plumbs further, Waltari makes an exciting, vivid, and minute re-creation of the society of Thebes and of Egypt and the related world in general, ranging from Pharaoh and his neighbor kings to the outcast corpse-washers in the House of the Dead. We see, feel, smell, and taste Waltari's Egypt. He writes in a pungent, easy style and it is obvious that he has been wonderfully served by his translator, Naomi Walford." Gladys Schmitt, writing for The New York Times, commented on the unresolved philosophical dilemma posed between Ekhnaton's generosity for bettering the world and Horemheb's pragmatic belligerence for stability, and praised the vibrancy and historical research evident in the characterisation of countries and social classes; however, she criticised social struggles surrounding Akhenaton as obscured, and found events oversensational and the characters composed of predictable types. Kirkus Reviews wrote: "He [Sinuhe] observes- and remembers- and in his old age writes it down, – the world as he knew it. It's a rich book, a bawdy book, a book that carries one to distant shores and makes one feel an onlooker as was Sinuhe. The plot is tenuous, a slender thread never wholly resolved. But the book opens one's eyes to an ancient world, nearer to ours than we think."

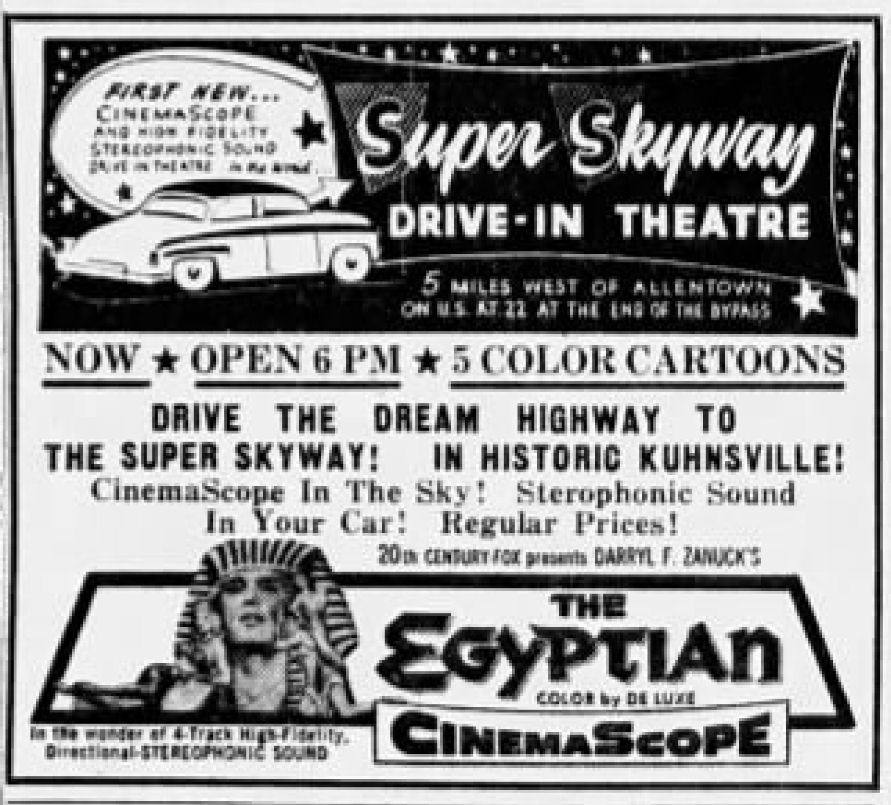
Ad for the 1954 Hollywood film adaptation

Soon after its release in the USA, it was selected book of the month in September 1949, and then entered the bestseller lists in October 1949, where it remained the unparalleled two years – 550 000 copies were sold in that time. Marion Saunders, the agent who had arranged its US publication, remarked that she had never seen anything like it during her 15-year career. It remained the most sold foreign novel in the US before its place was taken over by The Name of the Rose, by Umberto Eco. Overall the reception was highly positive and some predicted Waltari as being a Nobel prize candidate. A film version with a budget of 5 million dollars and an extensive marketing campaign started production in 1952 and was released in 1954. However, there were issues with actors and inexperience with the then new Cinemascope technology, and the film received mixed reviews and modest financial success.

=== Losing the "popular fiction" stigma ===
In Finnish academic literary circles, critics had generally regarded Waltari as an author of popular fiction. This stigma he had gained for perceived overproductivity, superficiality and looseness of style; for his popular erotic flavouring in clearly told stories; and not conforming to the "Great Tradition" of Finnish literature (patriotic, realistic depiction of the struggles of poor yet courageous Finns with nature and society) favoured by critics at the time. Despite its popularity and acclaim, the novel was denied the 1946 state literature award, largely due to the efforts of vocal Waltari critic and ideological opponent Raoul Palmgren. Even the overseas success was denounced in Finland as a popular novel's success. Ritva Haavikko has described the literary discourse of the time as having been dominated by indifference and jealousy towards Waltari. Waltari finally gained appreciation in Finland in the 1980s, after his historical novels had made appearances in French bestseller lists one after another.

Several cover designs were attempted over the years; it was not until 1972, when illustrator Björn Landström fashioned this cover, that one would last generations and become iconic in Finland.

The Egyptian has since secured the place as a classic and masterpiece of Finnish literature. It came at first place in a 1988 Finnish reader poll, second place (after Alastalon salissa by Volter Kilpi) in a 1992 poll by Finnish representatives of art, science and culture, it was voted by Finns as the most beloved Finnish book in a 2008 poll and in a 2017 poll it was selected as the Finnish book of the century. When Finnish writer and scholar Panu Rajala was in 2017 asked by Ilta-Sanomat to select the 10 best books from Finland's period of independence, The Egyptian was one of them and he commented:

"This is clear as day. The Egyptian is the greatest. You can pick out almost anything from The Egyptian. As a depiction of war propaganda it is magnificent. It demonstrates its significance also in its phrase rhythm. Waltari was able to develop a rhythmically wavy, but simultaneously picture-rich narrative style. The Egyptian tells of the futility of human life and the disappearance of utopias and big dreams and how idealism produces to humanity primarily nothing but suffering and more pain. On the other hand it depicts the durability of realism, how people who acknowledge facts survive and do well." (Note: Finnish: "Tämä on päivänselvä. Sinuhe on suurin. Sinuhesta voi poimia melkein mitä hyvänsä. Se on sotapropagandan kuvauksena suurenmoinen. Romaani osoittaa merkityksellisyytensä myös lausepoljennossa. Waltari kykeni kehittämään rytmillisesti aaltoilevan, mutta samalla kuvarikkaan kertomatyylin. Sinuhe kertoo ihmisen elämän turhuudesta ja utopioiden ja suurten unelmien katoamisesta ja siitä, miten idealismi tuottaa ihmiskunnalle etupäässä pelkkää kärsimystä ja lisää tuskaa. Toisaalta se kuvaa realismin kestävyyden, miten tosiasiat tunnustavat ihmiset selviävät ja pärjäävät.")

As a result of its use in the novel, the name Minea remains in occasional use in Finland. Likewise, named in Finland after the novel's protagonist are Sinuhe Wallinheimo and a café chain. Finnish presidential candidates have mentioned The Egyptian and other Waltari novels as favourites during elections.

=== International reputation ===
By the 1990s, Waltari was regarded in foreign countries not as a specifically Finnish author but as a master of historical fiction in world literature. He had been invited multiple times to lecture in U.S. universities and literary clubs, but turned down these for his inadequate English and as he felt "the author shouldn't cause to his readers the disappointment caused by meeting him in person". (Note: Finnish: "kirjailijan ei tule aiheuttaa lukijoilleen henkilökohtaisen kohtaamisen aiheuttamaa pettymystä") He also politely turned down Egyptian President Nasser's invitation to visit Egypt, because it no longer had anything in common with the ancient one and he was already done with the subject.

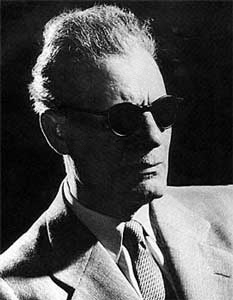
Taha Hussein was among the novel's admirers.

An unlicensed Arabic translation appeared in Egypt in 1955, translated from the incomplete English version by engineer Hamed al-Qasb. Taha Hussein, an influential figure in Arabic literature, had read the French translation of The Egyptian and was very much taken in despite his reputation of criticalness. In the preamble of the Arabic translation of The Egyptian he relates that he had read numerous books about ancient Egypt but none had come close to Waltari's novel. He lamented the fact that it was translated from English instead of directly from Finnish, and exclaimed: "Because we have no mastery of even the dominant languages of the world, how could we translate from the minority languages either!" (Note: Finnish (presumably from Arabic): "Koska emme hallitse maailman valtakieliäkään, kuinka kykenisimme kääntämään mitään vähemmistökieleltäkään!") Faruk Abu-Chacra from the University of Helsinki has since then begun a project to produce a complete Arabic version, although he clarifies he is not the translator; as of 2003, he compares the 1955 edition with the original Finnish and other European versions, Pekka Lehtinen is the official translator, and they have to translate the missing portions by themselves. Abu-Chacra describes The Egyptian as a very well-known and respected novel in Egypt, but that nowadays it has become a rarity, disappearing from libraries in Arab countries. It took him 30 years to find some Arabic copies, from Beirut.

Among Czechs, The Egyptian and Waltari's oeuvre enjoy immense, "cult-like" popularity. The Egyptian depicted cynical power politics and a world of violence similar to which the Eastern Bloc lived under; it came out in Czechoslovakia in 1965, at a time when the country's isolation from the rest of the world was starting to ease. Translator Marta Hellmuthová, wanting to convey the novel's message to the Czech people as purely as possible, had learned Finnish in four months to translate directly from the original. It took her 9 years of work, some of it while under imprisonment for Western thinking, until she was done. The novel was voted as the 6th dearest book in a 2006 audience poll conducted by Czech television. A reader wrote in Lidové noviny: "I can say that it [The Egyptian] helped me survive through the darkness of the communist era sane! I am immensely grateful to Mr. Waltari." (Note: Finnish (presumably from Czech): "Voin sanoa, että minua se (Sinuhe) auttoi selviytymään kommunistiajan pimeyden läpi täysjärkisenä! Olen herra Waltarille suunnattoman kiitollinen.") When Markéta Hejkalová's Waltari biography was released in 2007, a review in Hospodářské noviny likened it to the Czechs' own 200-page version of a monument to Waltari.

== Adaptations ==
- Sinuhe egyptiern, 1950 Swedish comic released posthumously
- The Egyptian, 1954 American film
- Sinuhe, 1953 Finnish ballet on the piano
- Sinuhe, 1965 Finnish ballet
- Sinuhe egyptiläinen, 1982 Finnish radio drama
- Sinuhe, 2006 Finnish sonata for solo oboe or flute

== See also ==
- Amarna period
- List of historical novels
- Moses and Monotheism
