= Kaarlo Sarkia =

Finnish poet

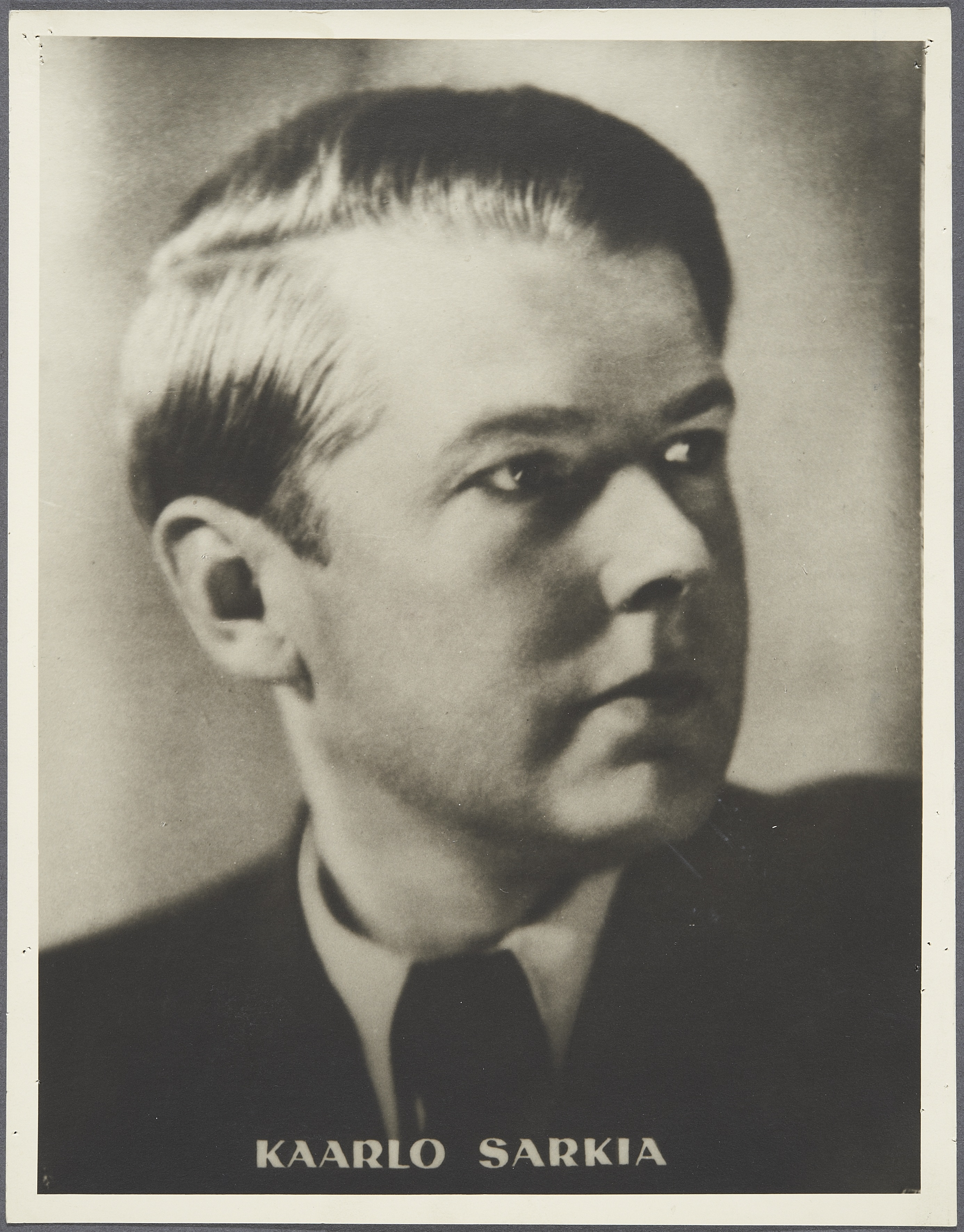
- Kaarlo Sarkia in the 1940s
- Born: Kaarlo Teodor Sulin; 11 May 1902; Kiikka, Grand Duchy of Finland
- Died: 16 November 1945 (aged 43); Sysmä, Finland
- Occupations: poet, translator
- Years active: 1929–1944

Kaarlo Sarkia (11 May 1902 – 16 November 1945) was a Finnish poet and translator who was influenced by romantic poetry. His poems include motifs like childhood memories, love, landscapes and dreamworld, and in his last collection of poetry also his personal death and mankind's sufferings. Together with Uuno Kailas, Sarkia was the most prominent Finnish poet of the 1930s. As Kailas, his poetry also had homosexual themes.

Sarkia published four collections of poetry between 1929 and 1943. In addition to his own works, Sarkia was known as a translator of French and Italian poetry. Sarkia was also a contemporary member of the Finnish literary group Tulenkantajat. Sarkia never had a permanent home or regular job and he used to spend terms in sanatoriums. Sarkia died of tuberculosis at the age of 43.

== Life ==
Sarkia was born in the municipality of Kiikka, Satakunta in southwest Finland as an illegitimate child of the maid Aleksandra Sulin. Sarkia's father was most likely the local carpenter Malakias Korkki. His mother died of tuberculosis in 1916 and Sarkia moved to live with his godmother Hilda Runni. With a help of his grandparents Sarkia was able to finish the secondary school in Tyrvää. During his schoolyears, Sarkia got interested in poetry and also became aware of his homosexuality. Sarkia learned French and German in Tyrvää, where he lived by the local pharmacist whose wife was born in Switzerland.

Sarkia graduated from the secondary school in 1923 and accomplished his military service in the Hennala Garrison in the spring of 1924. He worked for a year as a tutor in Rantasalmi and entered the University of Helsinki in 1925. In Helsinki Sarkia lived in cheap accommodation, suffered from poverty and was hospitalized several times for the tuberculosis he caught during the military service. In 1926 he received a scholarship and made a short trip to Germany. A year later he began studies at the University of Turku, joining the literary circle of V. A. Koskenniemi.

His first collection, Kahlittu (″Chained″) was released in 1929. The second collection, Velka elämälle (″The Debt to Life″) in 1931, included the poem Antinous, which dealt with homoerotic love. Antinous was the lover of the Roman emperor Hadrian. The title poem was about love and desertion, dedicated to his mother. His two first collections did not cause much attention, but Sarkia became known for his translation of Arthur Rimbaud's Le Bateau ivre in 1932. In December 1933 Sarkia had a job at the university library in Turku, where the chief librarian was the writer Volter Kilpi. Just a month later, Sarkia tried to commit suicide with an oversdose of barbiturate. Sarkia's third book, Unen kaivo (″The Well of Dreams″, 1936), was a commercial and critical success. The collection included the poem Barcarola, which is influenced by Friedrich Nietzsche's Die Sonne sinkt. It has been described as one of his most wonderful poems. In 1937, Sarkia traveled to Switzerland where he spent several months. He also visited Rome where Sarkia kept a speech against Hitler and was arrested.

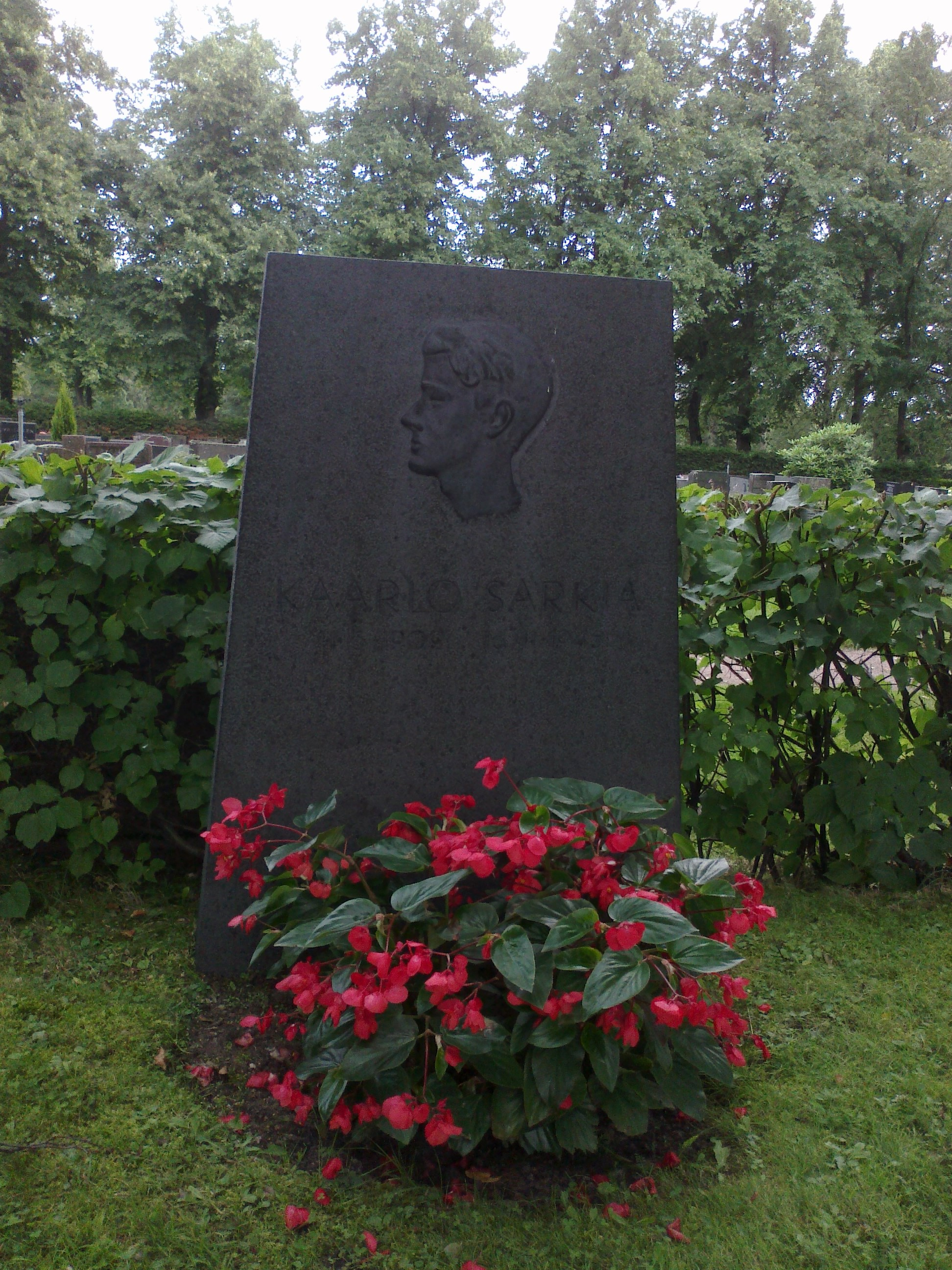
The grave of Kaarlo Sarkia in Helsinki.

Sarkia never graduated from the universities of Helsinki or Turku. In the early 1943, Sarkia lived a couple of months in the small village of Sysmä, but moved soon to Helsinki, as the state granted him a pension. Sarkia also received a monthly payment from his publisher WSOY. At this time, Sarkia was already seriously ill. His fourth book, Kohtalon vaaka (″The Scale of Fate″) came out the same year, in the middle of the World War II, when Finland was fighting as an ally of Nazi Germany. Sarkia did not join the writers who produced patriotic propaganda. Instead, the collection featured several pacifist and anti-war poems. As a result, Sarkia was criticized for being unpatriotic. In 1944 Sarkia edited his collections into a single volume Runot (″The Poems″).

As the war ended, Sarkia travelled to Sweden for a period at a local sanatorium. Sarkia never made it to the hospital, but spent his time in a Stockholm hotel. When Sarkia returned Finland, he went to Sysmä to the care of two sisters with whom he had become acquainted. Sarkia died there of tuberculosis in November 1945 at the age of 43. He was buried to the Hietaniemi Cemetery in Helsinki.

== Importance ==
According to the Finnish writer Tuomas Anhava, Sarkia occupies same position in the history of Finnish poetry that John Keats has in English and Alfred de Musset in French poetry. Sarkia has been described as a ″composer of words″ as his poems are known of their euphony and rhythm. Many of Sarkia's poems have been set to music, by composers like Erik Bergman and Kaj Chydenius. His poetry has even influenced on the lyrics of the Finnish death metal group Insomnium.

Among the poets he translated were Arthur Rimbaud, François Villon, Victor Hugo, Charles Baudelaire and Gabriele D’Annunzio. Sarkia's translation of Baudelaire's Les Fleurs du mal has been praised of its rich imagery and rhythmical experimentations. Another famous translation is the Finnish version of Rimbaud's Le Bateau ivre, which is considered ″brilliant″.

Sarkia's poems have never been published as a separate book in English. In 2008, the literary magazine Poetry Salzburg Review published some English translations by Pentti M. Rautaharju, a Doctor of Philosophy at the University of Minnesota.

== Commemoration ==
The literary society Sarkia-Seura was established in 1952. The Sarkia museum was opened in 1959 in the house where Sarkia lived with his godmother after his mother had died. Sarkia's statue was erected to his birthplace Kiikka in 1960. It is a work of the Finnish sculptor Kauko Räike.

In 2010, the artistic residence Villa Sarkia, run by the literary society Nuoren Voiman Liitto, was opened in Sysmä.

There is a street commemorating Kaarlo Sarkia in Vermonniitty (Espoo) named Kaarlo Sarkian katu. Streets commemorating other 1930s artists Uuno Kailas and Anna Sahlstén are also found nearby.
