= Minea =

Minea may refer to:

- Minea (singer) (born 1977), Croatian pop singer and television presenter
- Minea (name), a given name and surname

== See also ==
- Minaeans, inhabitants of the kingdom of Ma'in, in modern-day Yemen, from the 6th century BCE
  - Minaean language
