= Katri Vala =

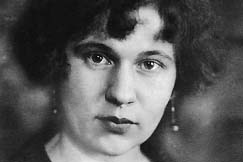

Katri Vala (1901–1944) was a Finnish poet, critic, school teacher, and central member of the literary group Tulenkantajat (The Fire Bearers) with Olavi Paavolainen, Elina Vaara, Lauri Viljanen, Ilmari Pimiä, Viljo Kajava, and Yrjö Jylhä.

== Biography ==
She was born in 1901 in Muonio, and died of tuberculosis in 1944 in the Hessleby sanatorium at Mariannelund in Sweden.
