= Ihmeellinen Joosef =

Ihmeellinen Joosef is a Finnish novel written by Mika Waltari under his pseudonym M. Ritvala and published in 1938. He adapted it also as a play the same year.
