= Kaj Lindgren =

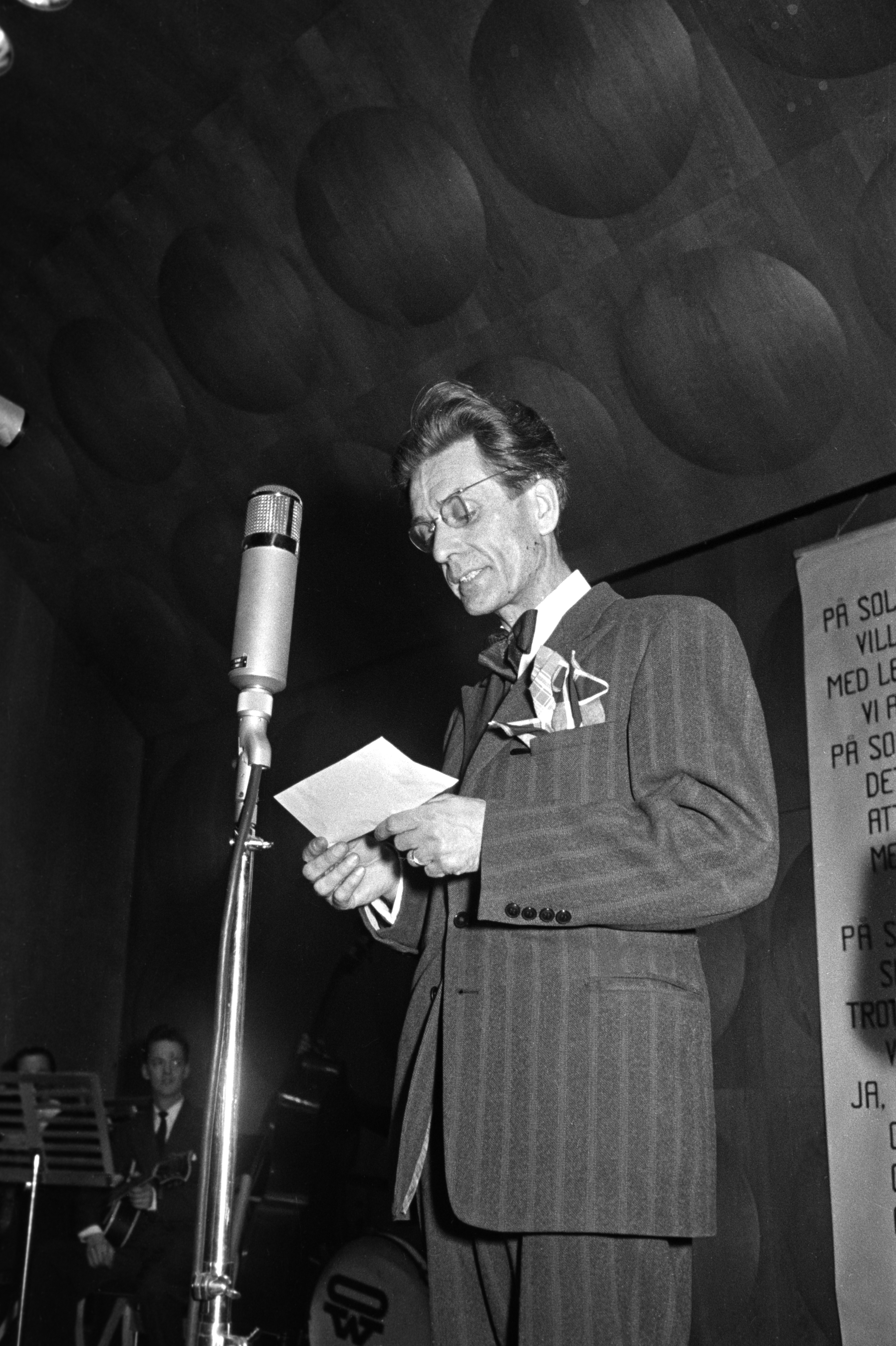
- Born: August 20, 1908; Helsinki
- Died: March 6, 1976 (aged 67)

Kaj August Lindgren ( 20 August 1908, Helsinki - 6 March 1976, Helsinki) was a Finnish teacher, author, and literary critic. He was married to R. Norrmen from 1939-1941, a marriage which ended in divorce, and in 1945 he married Elna Linnea Strömberg.

== Biography ==
Lindgren was son to August Lindgren and Hanna Boberg. His father was head of a telegraph office. He graduated from the Swedish Lyceum of Vyborg in 1928 and obtained a Bachelor of Philosophy and a Master of Philosophy in 1934. He served as a substitute teacher of Swedish and history at Grankulla samskola from 1935 to 1936, was principal of the Eastern Uusimaa Folk High School in Kuggom, in the parish of Pernå, from 1938 to 1953, and of the Pernå Fisheries School from 1938 to 1958, and later a senior lecturer in the mother tongue at Munksnäs svenska samskola from 1953 to 1973. He also taught at the Helsinki School of Business from 1953 to 1955 and at the College of Veterinary Medicine from 1958 to 1964.

== Works ==
=== Poetry ===
- Ett blad är vänt (1935)
- Trä-orgel (1937)
- Brev tili mitt hjärta (1940)
- Stig fram, värt land... (1942)
- Tall i storm (1944)
- I bägens tid (1948)

=== Translations ===
- Kosta vad kosta vill (1946) by Hilja Haahti
- Runeberg och hans diktning 1804—1837 (1947) by Lauri Viljanen
- Kärlek utan strumpor (1959–60) by Herman Wessel

=== As editor ===
- Ärsbok för den svenska folkhögskolan i Finland [Yearbook for the Swedish Folk High School in Finland] (1943)
