= Uuno Kailas =

Finnish poet and writer (1901–1933)

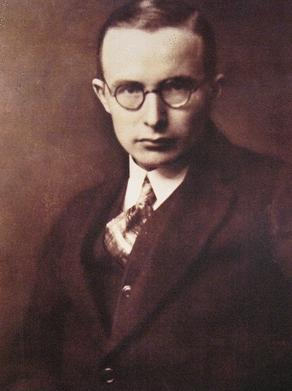
- Uuno Kailas
- Born: 29 March 1901; Heinola, Finland
- Died: 22 March 1933 (aged 31); Nice, France
- Occupations: Poet, author, translator
- Writing career
- Literary movement: Tulenkantajat

Uuno Kailas, born Frans Uno Salonen (29 March 1901 – 22 March 1933) was a Finnish poet, writer, and translator. Together with Kaarlo Sarkia, Kailas was the most prominent Finnish poet of the 1930s.

== Life ==
Kailas was born in Heinola. After his mother's death, the boy received a strict religious upbringing from his grandmother. He studied in Heinola and occasionally in the University of Helsinki. In 1919, he took part in the Aunus expedition, where his close friend Bruno Schildt was killed.

Kailas' criticism and translations were published in Helsingin Sanomat. His first collection of poetry was Tuuli ja tähkä in 1922.

Kailas served in the army from 1923 until 1925. In 1929, he was hospitalized due to schizophrenia, and he was also diagnosed with tuberculosis. He died in Nice, France in 1933, and was buried in Helsinki.

== Works ==
=== Poetry ===
- Tuuli ja tähkä (Gummerus, 1922)
- Purjehtijat (WSOY, 1925)
- Silmästä silmään (Schildt, 1926)
- Paljain jaloin (Otava, 1928)
- Uni ja kuolema (WSOY, 1931)
- Runoja (poems from poetry collections Paljain jaloin, Purjehtijat, Silmästä silmään, Tuuli ja tähkä and Uni ja kuolema; WSOY, 1932)
- Punajuova (WSOY, 1933)
- Valikoima runoja (WSOY, 1938)
- Isien tie (WSOY, 1941)
- Uuno Kailaan runoja (selection; WSOY, 1963)
- Ja tomust alkaa avaruus (selection; Karisto, 1984)
- Unen, kuoleman ja intohimon lauluja (selection; Otava, 1986)
- Unten maa (selection; Karisto 1989)
- Tuulien laulu (selection; among Saima Harmaja's and Eino Leino's poems; Kirjapaja, 1992)
- Tuulien nousuun (Kirjapaja, 1996)
- Palava laulu (selection; WSOY, 2000)

=== Short stories ===
- Novelleja (WSOY 1936)

=== Translations ===
- Leacock, Stephen: Pukinsorkka (Gummerus, 1923)
- Bruhn, Rudolf: Kuuden kerho (Otava 1924)
- Kaunis Saksa (WSOY 1924)
- Rakkauden korkea veisu (Gummerus 1924)
- Rosen, Erwin: Kaikkien valtojen uhalla (Gummerus 1924)
- France, Anatole: Aadamin ensimmäisen vaimon tytär (Kansanvalta 1926)
- Mörne, Arvid: Meren kasvojen edessä (Schildt 1926)
- Scott, Gabriel: Polku (Schildt 1926)
- Södergran, Edith: Levottomia unia (Tulenkantajain osakeyhtiö 1929)
- Kessel, Joseph: Ruhtinasöitä (Näytelmä 1930)
- Tegnér, Esaias: Fritjofin taru (Otava 1932)
- Södergran, Edith: Kohtaamisia (valikoima; WSOY 1982)
- Södergran, Edith: Runoja (WSOY 1942; also known as Kultaiset linnut, Karisto 1990)
- Södergran, Edith: Elämäni, kuolemani ja kohtaloni (among Pentti Saaritsa's ja Aale Tynni's translations; Otava 1994)
- Södergran, Edith: Hiljainen puutarha (Karisto 1994)

== Literature ==
- Maunu Niinistö: Uuno Kailas: hänen elämänsä ja hänen runoutensa. WSOY, 1956.
- Matti Hälli: Uuno Kailaasta Aila Meriluotoon. Suomalaisten kirjailijain elämäkertoja. WSOY, 1947.
- Uuno Kailas: muistojulkaisu. WSOY, 1933.
- Kalle Achté: Uuno Kailas – runoilija psykiatrin silmin. Yliopistopaino.
