= From Father to Son =

1942 novel by Mika Waltari

- early edition
- Author: Mika Waltari
- Original title: Isästä poikaan
- Publication date: 1942

From Father to Son (Finnish: Isästä poikaan) is a 1942 novel by the Finnish writer Mika Waltari.
