= The Secret of the Kingdom =

1959 novel by Mika Waltari

- First edition (Finnish)
- Author: Mika Waltari
- Original title: Valtakunnan salaisuus
- Translator: Naomi Walford
- Language: Finnish
- Publisher: WSOY
- Publication date: 1959
- Publication place: Finland
- English publication date: 1960
- Pages: 420
- Followed by: The Roman

The Secret of the Kingdom (original title Valtakunnan salaisuus) is a 1959 novel by Finnish author Mika Waltari about the early days of Christianity. The story is told through the eyes of Marcus, a Roman citizen who arrives in Jerusalem on the day Jesus is crucified.

== Plot ==
Marcus, an Ancient Roman citizen, arrives in Jerusalem. As he rides into the city he passes by a hill on which three men are being crucified. When he pays the customary courtesy call on the governor, Pontius Pilate, he learns that one of the three men, Jesus of Nazareth, is the leader of a religious sect suspected of sedition. Pilate confides to Marcus that there are rumors that the disciples of Jesus will steal his body and then claim he is risen from the dead. To prevent this, Pilate has posted a guard of Roman soldiers at the tomb of Jesus.

A couple of days later, Marcus is summoned before Pilate. He is told that the soldiers at the tomb claim to have been blinded by a great light, and that when they regained their sight, the body of Jesus was gone. Pilate suspects that the guards were drunk or sleeping on guard. He asks Marcus, as a newly arrived and presumably impartial observer, to go to the tomb and investigate. Marcus becomes convinced that Jesus did rise from the dead, and over the next weeks and months he tries to learn all he can about the man Jesus, who he was and what he stood for. He talks to anyone he can find who knew Jesus or who had any contact with him, including Mary Magdalene, a number of the disciples, Lazarus of Bethany, whom Jesus reportedly raised from the dead, and even Simon of Cyrene, the man dragged out of the crowd and forced to carry the cross of Jesus.

What Marcus learns is that all those whose lives were touched by Jesus are changed in some way, in varying degrees, but all remain human, with human flaws and frailties. Mary Magdalene, for example, is envious of the disciples and their special relationship to Jesus, resentful at what she sees as their lack of sufficient respect for her, and contemptuous of what she considers their lack of sophistication. And Zaccheus, the man Jesus called down from the tree, is much more generous than he had been before his encounter with Jesus, but is also vain of the special favor shown to him.

As Marcus learns more about the teaching of Jesus, or The Way, as the disciples call it, he becomes a believer, and longs to be a part of the Kingdom. But the Disciples, while quite willing to accept Marcus's assistance (financial and otherwise), are not yet ready to accept him into their circle, nor to interpret Jesus's commission to spread his gospel 'to all the world' as meaning acceptance of Gentiles into full Christian fellowship.

Most of the latter half of the novel recounts the quest of Marcus for acceptance into the Kingdom. In the end, he finds peace, as he reconciles himself to his own unique place in the birth of this new faith.

== Reception ==
Kirkus Reviews described the novel as "a distinguished and original book", and wrote: "It is a moving story, with none of the shock techniques that one has come to expect of Waltari." Robert Payne of The Saturday Review compared the book to Ernest Renan's depiction of Jesus: "Mika Waltari is a faitliful follower of Renan, and his long novel is as incredible as all the rest. Jesus is crucified and rises from the grave on the third day, and it is all painless, easy to read, and completely unreal." Payne continued: "I thought Lloyd Douglas had reached the extreme of vulgarity in The Robe, but Mika Waltari excels him. There are scenes in this book so tasteless that they seem designed to reduce the story of Jesus to the dimensions of an anecdote. It will be very, very successful."
