= A Nail Merchant at Nightfall =

1949 novel by Mika Waltari

- First UK edition
- Author: Mika Waltari
- Original title: Neljä päivänlaskua
- Translator: Alan Beesley
- Language: Finnish
- Publisher: WSOY; Putnam (UK)
- Publication date: 1949
- Publication place: Finland
- English publication date: 1955
- Pages: 194

A Nail Merchant at Nightfall (Finnish: Neljä päivänlaskua) is a 1949 novel by the Finnish writer Mika Waltari. It is a metafictional and humorous account of when Waltari wrote his novel The Egyptian. It was published in English in 1954, translated by Alan Beesley.

== Plot Summary ==
The narrator (a fictionalized version of the author) living an ordinary happy life, until he is troubled by dreams about Egyptians who demand that he write down their story.

Eventually the narrator relents and beings to write down the story dictated to him by the Egyptian Sinuhe. He experiences increasingly hallucinatory episodes, until he finishes the story, the Egyptians disappear, and his life returns to normal.

The story includes end-notes which ironically comment on errors in the story.

== Reception ==
Martin Levin of The Saturday Review described the book as "an involved little allegory in which the temptations of the flesh and the pains of authorship are almost thoroughly obscured by a series of symbolic vignettes." Kirkus Reviews wrote: "A tour de force which may, just possibly, capture the fancy of those looking for something in the vein of allegory, fantasy. ... There are bits of poetic writing here. But the appeal is special."

== Bibliography ==
- Waltari, Mika (1954). A Nail Merchant at Nightfall:A Novel. Putnam.
- Rajala, Panu (2008). Unio mystica: Mika Waltarin elämä ja teokset (in Finnish). Helsinki: WSOY. ISBN 978-951-0-31137-0.
