= The Wanderer (Waltari novel) =

1949 novel

- First US edition (publ. G.P. Putnam's Sons, 1951)
- Author: Mika Waltari
- Original title: Mikael Hakim
- Genre: Historical novel
- Publisher: WSOY
- Publication date: 1949
- Publication place: Finland
- Awards: 1950 State Literary Prize of Finland
- Preceded by: The Adventurer

The Wanderer (in the US) or The Sultan's Renegade (in the UK) is a 1949 historical novel by Mika Waltari. It is a sequel to The Adventurer, which tells of the adventures of a young Finnish man, Mikael Karvajalka, in 16th-century Europe. The Wanderer tells the story of how Mikael converts from Christianity to Islam and rises to a high position in the court of Suleiman the Magnificent. Many historical events are recounted in the book, but Mikael's involvement in them is fictitious.

== Plot ==
The plot of The Wanderer begins at the end of the events described in The Adventurer. Mikael Karvajalka, born in either 1502 or 1503 in Turku, Finland, and his friend Antti Tykinvalaja had left their homeland and experienced many remarkable adventures in 1520's Europe, finding themselves at the center of massive political change at the beginning of the New Age and Protestant Reformation. At the end of The Adventurer, Mikael and Antti leave the sacked city of Rome to begin their pilgrimage to the holy land as an atonement for their sins. Thus begins the plot of The Wanderer.

Mikael and Antti travel by ship to Venice. From there they take a ship to the Holy Land, but their boat is attacked by a Muslim pirate ship commanded by famed pirate Dragut. The Christian pilgrims are all either taken as slaves or killed. Mikael and Antti escape death by converting to Islam. They are taken as slaves to the island of Jerba with an Italian woman named Giulia, whom Mikael met on the ship.

From Jerba Mikael and Antti are sent to Algiers, as slaves of merchant Abu El-Kasim, where they are tasked with bringing about the fall of tyrant Selim Ben-Hafs. It is Abu El-Kasim who names Mikael "Hakim", or "doctor". Eventually Selim Ben-Hafs is killed by Antti and the pirate Hayreddin Barbarossa takes control of the city. As reward for his services, Giulia is given to Mikael as his slave. Mikael has long been enchanted by the mystical eyes of Giulia, which are different colored. After having long resisted his attempts, Giulia finally agrees to marry Mikael.

Khaireddin sends Mikael, Antti, and Giulia as part of ships carrying gifts to Sultan Soleiman the Magnificent in Istanbul, in the hope that the sultan will recognize his rule over Algiers. In Istanbul, Mikael soon meets Ibrahdim Pasha, grand vizier of the Ottoman Empire. Mikael is assigned to work for the cartographer Piri Reis. Mikael soon comes face-to-face with the sultan himself, and gifts his dog Raul to Dsihangir, the son of the sultan.

Mikael is assigned the role of translator in the Ottoman army, which is starting a massive invasion of Hungary and Vienna. The Ottoman Siege of Vienna fails, but Mikael earns Ibradhim's trust as his loyal servant. Mikael is gifted a large property by the Vizier in Istanbul. Meanwhile Antti marries a wealthy young Hungarian girl, whom he met in Vienna.

Soon after returning home Mikael's wife Giulia tells him she is pregnant. Seven months later she births a girl, whom Mikael names Miriam.

== Reception ==
The Mikael duology won the 1950 State Literary Prize of Finland.
