= A Stranger Came to the Farm =

1937 novel by Mika Waltari

- First US edition
- Author: Mika Waltari
- Original title: Vieras mies tuli taloon
- Translator: Naomi Walford
- Publisher: WSOY; Putnam (US)
- Publication date: 1937
- English publication date: 1952
- Pages: 211

A Stranger Came to the Farm (Finnish: Vieras mies tuli taloon) is a 1937 novel by the Finnish writer Mika Waltari. It tells the tragic story of a farming couple where the husband is an alcohol abuser.

== Publication ==
The book was published in Finnish by WSOY in 1937. It appeared in English in 1952, translated by Naomi Walford and published by Putnam.

== Reception ==
Edmund Fuller of Saturday Review wrote that the book

is effective, striking, in many ways. Yet in spite of the sparseness and compactness of the book [Waltari] manages to make it almost lush, or purple, in some of its passages. It is good of its kind, but I am afraid it is more of an interesting item in relation to Waltari's body of work than an enhancement of his reputation.

== Adaptations ==
The book has been adapted for film twice, in 1938 by Wilho Ilmari as Vieras mies tuli taloon and in 1957 by Hannu Leminen as The Stranger.
