= The Adventurer (novel) =

1948 novel by Mika Waltari

- First edition cover
- Author: Mika Waltari
- Original title: Mikael Karvajalka
- Genre: Historical novel
- Publisher: WSOY
- Publication date: 1948
- Publication place: Finland
- Awards: 1950 State Literary Prize of Finland
- Followed by: The Wanderer

The Adventurer (UK title: Michael The Finn; original title Mikael Karvajalka) is a novel by Finnish author Mika Waltari, published in 1948. It is a fictional tale of a young Finnish man, Mikael Karvajalka (Hairy-foot), set in 16th century Europe. Mikael is portrayed as an intellectual but rather naive person. Beginning life as an orphan bastard, he pursues a better social position with help of friendly people and by means of theological studies, but ends up drifting along through historical events across Europe rather than being able to steer his life himself.

== Plot summary ==
The book begins in the city of Turku and follows Mikael along an adventure throughout Europe and the Mediterranean. The book depicts many actual historical events with a rich style, although Mikael's involvement in the events is fictitious. The historical events and milieu featured in the book include:

- Denmark's conquest of Sweden, the Stockholm Bloodbath and eventually the downfall of king Christian II of Denmark.
- Student life at the Sorbonne in Paris at this time.
- Protestant Reformation and related political unrest in Germany (the Poor Barons' Rebellion and the peasants' war), Luther and Müntzer themselves appearing as side characters.
- Spanish monarch sending conquistadors to New World, Mikael almost made to join Pizarro's expedition.
- A witch-hunt conducted by the Inquisition in a small German town, claiming the life of an innocent girl.
- Wars in 16th-century Europe and expansion of the Ottoman Empire.
- Plundering of Rome (Sack of Rome) during reign of Pope Clement VII

The story is continued in The Wanderer, where the protagonist explores the Ottoman Empire.

== Reception ==
The Mikael duology won the 1950 State Literary Prize of Finland. The Adventurer inspired Jean Auel to start her career as a writer: "It was this story that began to crystallize for me an understanding of the real power of fiction: its ability to make the reader feel. Whatever else a work of fiction may be – educational, intellectual, literary, narrative – if it doesn't move the reader, if it doesn't reach inside and grab, it's a waste of the medium and ultimately it fails."
