= Yö yli Euroopan =

Finnish play by Mika Waltari

Yö yli Euroopan is a Finnish play. It was written by Mika Waltari and produced in 1933. It was never performed during Waltari's lifetime; he had produced only 100 copies and forbidden any performances, copies or quotations. The republishing ban was overturned in 1999 upon WSOY issuing a collection of Waltari's plays with his heirs' permission, and the play premiered in 2012.
