= Suuri illusioni =

1928 novel by Mika Waltari

- Author: Mika Waltari
- Language: Finnish
- Publisher: WSOY
- Publication date: 1928
- Publication place: Finland
- Pages: 294

Suuri illusioni ('Great illusion' or 'Grand illusion') is a 1928 novel by the Finnish writer Mika Waltari and also his debut novel. It is about bohemian and aimless urban life in the author's own generation. The novel became a breakthrough for Waltari, who previously had been a writer of religious poetry and horror short stories. It received positive reviews and was translated into several languages.

The novel begins with a description of the feast in Mrs. Spindel's salon. Mrs. Spindel was modeled on Minna Craucher (1891–1932), a real-life salon manager known for her dubious reputation.

The book was the basis for the 1985 film Grand Illusion directed by Tuija-Maija Niskanen.
