= Minea (name) =

Minea is both a surname and feminine given name, of Romanian and Finnish origin, respectively. The given name, being unknown in the wider world, was probably invented by Finnish writer Mika Waltari in his 1945 novel The Egyptian, who is believed to have based it off of the name of the mythical Greek king Minos. Notable people with the name include:

== Surname ==
- Anișoara Sorohan (later Minea, born 1963), Romanian rower
- Daniel Minea (born 1961), Romanian footballer
- Gheorghe Minea (born 1959), Romanian wrestler

== Given name ==
- Minea Blomqvist (born 1985), Finnish golfer
