= The Etruscan =

1955 novel by Mika Waltari

- First edition (Finnish)
- Author: Mika Waltari
- Original title: Turms, kuolematon
- Language: Finnish
- Genre: Historical novel
- Publisher: WSOY
- Publication date: 1955
- Publication place: Finland

The Etruscan (original title Turms, kuolematon which translates to Turms, Immortal) is a novel by Mika Waltari, published in 1955, telling of the adventures of a young man, Turms, which begins approximately in 480 BC. It tells of the spiritual development of Turms, as he adventures from Greece to Sicily, then to Rome and then finally to Tuscany, where he learns of his immortality and his duties to the future. There are many actual historical events in this book, but how Turms gets involved in them is fictitious.

Turms is involved in the Ionian Rebellion against the Persian Empire and participates in the burning of the Lydian capital, Sardis. Fleeing Anatolia to escape punishment for crimes against the gods, Turms travels to the sacred Oracle of Delphi to seek judgment and understanding of his fate. He spends time in Athens during the tumultuous era of the Persian Wars before continuing his westward journey. Turms sails to Sicily, visiting Greek colonial outposts. He encounters Arsinoe, a priestess from Eryx, abducting her and journeying through Segesta and into the sanctuary of the native Sican people. Moving northward up the Italian peninsula, Turms and Arsinoe arrive in the budding, primitive republic of Rome. After Arsinoe leaves him for a Roman senator, Turms travels further north into the wealthy and mysterious cities of Etruria. It is here that he finally uncovers his true origins, realizing his destiny as an immortal lucumo (a sacred priest-king) of the Etruscan civilization.
