= The Roman =

1964 novel by Mika Waltari

- First UK edition (publ. Hodder & Stoughton, 1966)
- Author: Mika Waltari
- Original title: Ihmiskunnan viholliset
- Genre: Historical novel
- Publisher: WSOY
- Publication date: 1964
- Publication place: Finland
- Preceded by: The Secret of the Kingdom

The Roman (original title Ihmiskunnan viholliset, which translates to "the enemies of mankind") is a novel by Mika Waltari published in 1964, and was the last work of Waltari to be published during his lifetime. Set in Rome, the book is a sequel to The Secret of the Kingdom, a novel about the early days of Christianity. The protagonist and narrator is Minutus, the son of Marcus, the main character of the previous novel. Minutus is a Roman citizen striving to survive without political entanglements.

In the novel, Minutus travels from Corinth to Britain, to Rome and then to Jerusalem. Through a boyhood friendship with Nero, he becomes a sometimes advisor, sometimes a tool, and sometimes a fool of the capricious emperor. A cruel fate makes him the commander of the menagerie that supplied the wild animals that tore his firstborn son to pieces, and the book was ostensibly written as a guide for his second son, great-grandson of the Emperor Claudius.

== Plagiarism of the novel ==
In July 2008, news emerged that the novel had been plagiarized by television producer Colin Slater in his novel Lindum Colonia, published in 2003.
