= Rostislav Holthoer =

Finnish Egyptologist

Rostislav Holthoer (29 July 1937 – 28 April 1997) was a Finnish Egyptologist.

Holthoer received his PhD in 1977 at Uppsala University. He participated in archaeological studies in Nubia from 1961 to 1965; from 1969 he undertook frequent trips to Egypt.

Holthoer was awarded the title of docent at Uppsala University in 1977 and held the chair of professor of Egyptology there from 1980 to 1996. He was also active at the University of Helsinki, where he introduced Egyptology as an academic subject in 1968 and became a docent in 1979. In 1969, he founded the Finnish Egyptological Society, whose chairman he remained until his death in 1997. He published numerous works on ancient Egypt aimed at a general audience.

Holthoer has been called the father of Egyptology in Finland.

Holthoer was of German-Russian descent through his mother and Russian descent through his father.
