= Lauri Viljanen =

Lauri Viljanen (1900–1984) was a Finnish literary critic and writer.

He was born in Kaarina in Southwest Finland.

He was the leading critic of the literary group Tulenkantajat (The Flame Bearers) during the 1930s and 1940s.

== Published works ==
- Auringon purjeet, poetry collection. 1924
- Hurmioituneet kasvot, poetry collection. 1925 (anthology)
- Tähtikeinu, poetry collection. 1926
- Merkkivaloja. 1929
- Musta runotar, poetry collection. 1932
- V.A.Koskenniemi. 1935
- Taisteleva humanismi, essay collection. 1936
- Näköala vuorelta, poetry collection. 1936
- Atlantis, poetry collection. 1940
- Sotatalvi. 1941 (anthology)
- Illan ja aamun välillä, essay collection. 1941
- Runeberg ja hänen runoutensa I–III. 1944–1948
- Tuuli ja ihminen, poetry collection. 1945
- Kootut runot. 1946
- Venäjän runotar. 1949 (co-editor)
- Aleksis Kiven runomaailma. 1953
- Aleksis Kiven kootut runot. 1954 (editor)
- Hansikas ja muita kirjallisuustutkielmia. 1955
- Seitsemän elegiaa, poetry collection. 1957
- Valikoima runoja. 1958
- Lyyrillinen minä ja muita kirjallisuustutkielmia. 1959
- Henrik Ibsen. 1962
- Suomen kirjallisuus III. 1963 (editor)
- Ajan ulottuvuudet. 1974
- Kansojen kirjallisuus. 1974–1978 (co-editor)
