= Mika Waltari =

Finnish writer (1908–1979)

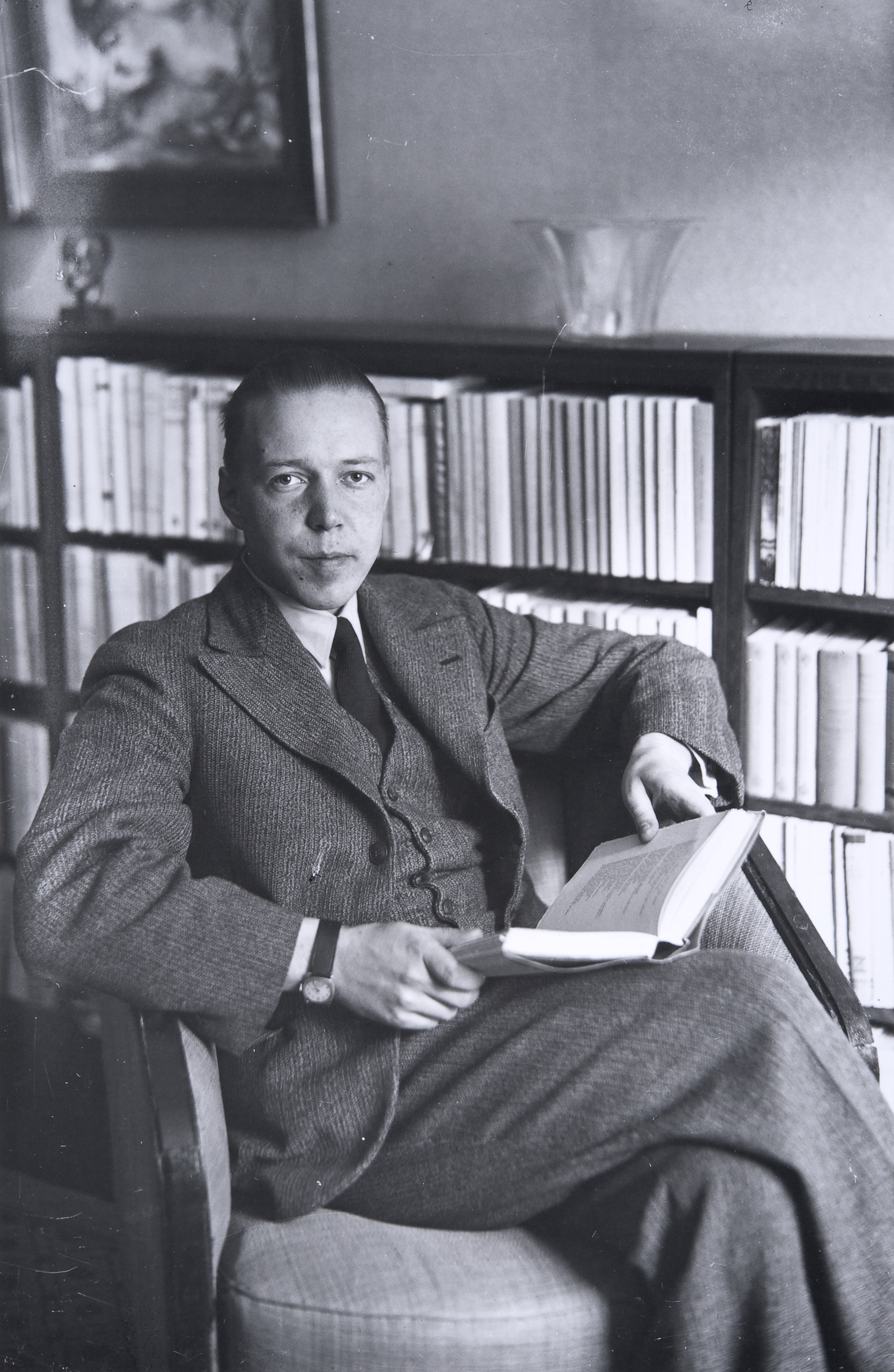
- Waltari in 1934
- Born: Mika Toimi Waltari; 19 September 1908; Helsinki, Grand Duchy of Finland
- Died: 26 August 1979 (aged 70); Helsinki, Finland
- Occupations: Author; translator; academician
- Writing career
- Movement: Tulenkantajat

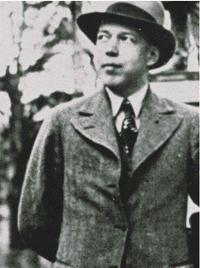
Waltari (1935)

Mika Toimi Waltari (pronounced [ˈmikɑ ˈʋɑltɑri]; 19 September 1908 – 26 August 1979) was a Finnish writer, best known for his best-selling novel The Egyptian (Finnish: Sinuhe egyptiläinen). He was extremely productive; Besides his novels he also wrote poetry, short stories, crime novels, plays, essays, travel stories, film scripts, and rhymed texts for comic strips by Asmo Alho.

== Biography ==
=== Early life ===
Waltari was born in Helsinki on 19 September 1908. His parents were Toimi Waltari and Olga Johansson; Toimi was a Lutheran pastor once, teaching religion in Porvoo, and Olga one of his pupils. A scandal caused by their relationship had forced them to move to Tampere and the two married on 18 November 1906. At the age of five, Mika Waltari suddenly lost his father to illness on 5 July 1914, and the 25-year old Olga Waltari was left, with crucial help from Toimi's brother Toivo, to support her three children: Samuli (7 years), Mika (5 years) and Erkki (6 months). As a boy, Waltari witnessed the Finnish Civil War, during which his White-sided family fled to the home of his mother's aunt at Laukkoski in Pornainen, near Porvoo, which was relatively peaceful and where the Whites were predominant.

Later he enrolled in the University of Helsinki as a theology student, according to his uncle Toivo's wishes, but soon abandoned theology in favour of philosophy, aesthetics and literature, graduating in 1929. While studying, he contributed to various magazines and wrote poetry and stories, getting his first book Jumalaa paossa published in 1925. It was a success, selling 3000 copies despite being only 72 pages long. In 1927, he went to Paris where he wrote his first major novel Suuri illusioni ('The Grand Illusion'), a story of bohemian life. In terms of style, the novel is considered to be the Finnish equivalent to the works of the American writers of the Lost Generation. (In Waltari's historical novel The Adventurer, taking place in the 16th century, the protagonist is a Finn who goes to study in Paris at much the same age that the author went to the same city in the 20th century). Suuri illusioni was a surprise hit, selling 8000 copies and turning Mika Waltari into a famous author. Waltari also was, for a while, a member of the liberal literary movement Tulenkantajat, though his political and social views later turned conservative. He was married on 8 March 1931 to Marjatta Luukkonen, whom he had met during military service the preceding year, and on 4 January 1932 they had a daughter, Satu. Satu also became a writer.

Throughout the 1930s and 1940s, Waltari worked as a journalist and critic, writing for a number of newspapers and magazines and travelling widely in Europe. He published articles in the official magazine of the Association of Finnish Culture and Identity, Suomalainen Suomi ('Finnish Finland'), which was later renamed as Kanava. He directed the magazine Suomen Kuvalehti. At the same time, he kept writing books in many genres, moving easily from one literary field to another. He had a very busy schedule and strict work ethic. He also suffered from manic-depressive psychosis and became depressed after completion of a book, sometimes to the extent of needing hospital treatment; in his manic phases he did his writing. He participated, and often succeeded, in literary competitions to prove the quality of his work to critics. One of these competitions gave rise to one of his most popular characters, Inspector Palmu, a gruff detective of the Helsinki Police Department, who starred in three mystery novels, all of which were filmed (a fourth film was made without Waltari involved). Waltari also scripted the popular cartoon Kieku ja Kaiku and wrote Aiotko kirjailijaksi, a guidebook for aspiring writers that influenced many younger writers such as Kalle Päätalo.

=== World War II and international break-through ===
During the Winter War (1939–1940) and the Continuation War (1941–1944), Waltari worked in the government information center, now also placing his literary skills at the service of political propaganda. According to historian Eino Jutikkala, through this experience as a propagandist Waltari became more cynical as he realised the prevalence of historical half-truths shaped by propaganda, later a recurrent theme in his historical novels. Although Waltari saw Soviet bolshevism as dangerous, he was attracted at first to the National Socialist theories about a new man. He visited Germany in 1939 and wrote a mostly favourable article titled Tuntematon Saksa ('Unknown Germany'). In 1942 he and 6 other Finnish writers visited Germany to attend the Congress of the European Writers' Union in Weimar and wrote yet more favourable coverage; a story goes however that he, being slightly drunk, refused the pocket money brought by their "patient and attentive German hosts" to their hotel by tearing it in half and throwing it away through the window.

1945 saw the publication of Waltari's first and most successful historical novel, The Egyptian. Its theme of the corruption of humanist values in a materialist world seemed curiously topical in the aftermath of World War II, and the book became an international bestseller, serving as the basis of the 1954 Hollywood movie of the same name. Waltari wrote seven more historical novels, placed in various ancient cultures, among others The Dark Angel, set during the Fall of Constantinople in 1453. In these novels, he gave powerful expression to his fundamental pessimism and also, in two novels set in the Roman Empire, to his Christian conviction. After the war, he also wrote several novellas. He became a member of the Finnish Academy in 1957 and received an honorary doctorate at the University of Turku in 1970.

=== Later years ===
Waltari's last two novels tell about early history of Christianity: Valtakunnan salaisuus (English title: The Secret of the Kingdom, 1959), and Ihmiskunnan viholliset (English title: The Roman, 1964). As a member of Academy of Science and Letters he guided younger writers. He was also involved in re-publishing and editing his early works, and gave long interviews to Ritva Haavikko which were published as a book.

Waltari was one of the most prolific Finnish writers. He wrote at least 29 novels, 15 novellas, 6 collections of stories or fairy-tales, 6 collections of poetry and 26 plays, as well as screen plays, radio plays, non-fiction, translations, and hundreds of reviews and articles. He is also internationally the best-known Finnish writer, and his works have been translated into more than 30 languages.

In his later years, Waltari wrote less and less. This is partly due to the enormous fees he received from foreign editions of The Egyptian and his other books, allowing him to stop "writing to live".

Mika Waltari died on 26 August 1979 in Helsinki, the year after his wife Marjatta's death in 1978.

== Literary themes and style ==
Markéta Hejkalová (who translated many of Waltari's works into Czech and wrote a biography about him) identifies nine common elements in Waltari's historical novels:

1. Journeys: The protagonist goes on journeys in foreign lands, is a "foreigner" in the world instead of having a home, and often has a comic sidekick. They can be called picaresque novels. Waltari himself travelled a lot, wrote two travelogues and researched his material on his trips.
2. Isolation: The protagonist often is an orphan, has unknown parents, or was born out of wedlock. His origins are mysterious but possibly from the highest ranks of society.
3. Power: The main character becomes acquainted with mighty power-holders, becoming their adviser and often admirer, and gains status and property. This kind of story of rags-to-riches via hard work is common in Finnish literature - and even mirrors Waltari's own life, as he at first relied on the help of his friends and relatives but later became a world-famous author.
4. A Turning Point: All novels take place at the time of a major and significant turning point in world history. The manner in which these are explored is influenced by similar turning points in Waltari's time.
5. Conflicts and Violence: Many kinds of battles, wars and other acts of violence are depicted (often in gruesome detail), within and between societies. Attention is devoted to multiple conflicts in a novel instead of specific single ones, and no side is portrayed as more righteous as the other. Waltari viewed that the violence of medieval torture sprung from the religious suppression of sexuality.
6. Rejection of Ideologies: All manipulative ideologies, which on the surface have noble goals but cause people to die in their name, are criticised. There are two common character types: The idealist, who has good intentions but brings about chaos and mayhem, and the realist, who is more immoral or even greedy and power-hungry but gets things done and achieves order and peace. According to Hejkalová, this tension between idealism and realism reflects post-World War II Finnish foreign policy: President Urho Kekkonen is the realist, who maintained the Paasikivi–Kekkonen line and preserved Finnish independence, whereas Carl Gustaf Emil Mannerheim she sees as possibly the prototypical idealist.
7. Good and Wicked Women: The main character has relationships with two kinds of women: There is a good but imperfect woman, who tragically dies before the hero's love for her can be fulfilled; and a beautiful but wicked femme fatale.
8. Witchcraft: The supernatural, mysticism and witchcraft are featured - not rationally explained away but treated as part of everyday life, as understood by the characters. There is a profound, personal relationship with God (or equivalent divine power).
9. Optimism: Counterintuitively in light of the above points, Waltari nonetheless holds the view that there is good among people, and that slowly, imperceptibly but inevitably humanity is headed towards goodness and salvation. Waltari paid special attention to the final parts of his novels and what mood or message they conveyed, providing a suitable uplifting catharsis.

== Legacy ==
=== Recognition ===
Waltari received the State literature award five times: 1933, 1934, 1936, 1949, and 1953. The Pro Finlandia Medal was given to him in 1952.

The 100th anniversary of Mika Waltari's birth was celebrated by selecting the writer as the main motif for a high value commemorative coin, the €10 Mika Waltari commemorative coin, minted in 2008. The reverse depicts a vigilant Pharaoh watchdog referencing his famous book. The obverse is decorated with Waltari's signature and a stylized pen nib that symbolizes the diversity of the writer's production.

Waltari's memorial in Töölö by Veikko Hirvimäki was unveiled in 1985.

Two asteroids have been named in honour of Waltari: n:o 4266 Mika Waltari and n:o 4512 Sinuhe.

=== Influence ===
Waltari's historical novels have been cited by G. R. R. Martin and Jean Auel as an influence.

== Works ==
=== Novels ===
- Jumalaa paossa (1925)
- Suuri illusioni (1928)
- Appelsiininsiemen (1931)
- Keisarin tekohampaat (1931, with Armas J. Pulla, AKA Leo Rainio)
- Punainen Madonna (1932, AKA Leo Rainio)
- Älkää ampuko pianistia! (1932, AKA Leo Rainio)
- Helsinki trilogy:
  1. Mies ja haave (1933)
  2. Sielu ja liekki (1934)
  3. Palava nuoruus (1935)
  4. From Father to Son (Isästä poikaan) (1942). Abbreviated reprint of the trilogy
- Surun ja ilon kaupunki (1936)
- A Stranger Came to the Farm series:
  1. A Stranger Came to the Farm (Vieras mies tuli taloon) (1937)
  2. Jälkinäytös (1938)
- Ihmeellinen Joosef eli elämä on seikkailua (1938, AKA M. Ritvala)
- Inspector Palmu series:
  1. Kuka murhasi rouva Skrofin? (1939)
  2. Inspector Palmu's Mistake (Komisario Palmun erehdys) (1940)
  3. Tähdet kertovat, komisario Palmu! (1962)
- Antero ei enää palaa (1940) Novella
- Fine van Brooklyn (1941) Novella
- Catherine (Kaarina Maununtytär) (1942)
- Ei koskaan huomispäivää!, AKA Kevät uuden maailmansodan varjossa (1942). Novella
- Rakkaus vainoaikaan (1943)
- Tanssi yli hautojen (1944)
- Jokin ihmisessä (1944) Novella
- Sellaista ei tapahdu, AKA Unohduksen pyörre (1944). Novella
- The Egyptian (Sinuhe egyptiläinen) (1945) Abridged translation
- Kultakutri (1948) Novella
- The Adventurer series:
  1. The Adventurer, AKA Michael The Finn (Mikael Karvajalka) (1948)
  2. The Wanderer, AKA The Sultan's Renegade (Mikael Hakim) (1949)
- A Nail Merchant at Nightfall (Neljä päivänlaskua) (1949)
- The Dark Angel series:
  1. The Dark Angel (Johannes Angelos) (1952)
  2. Nuori Johannes (1981) Prequel; published posthumously.
- The Etruscan (Turms, kuolematon) (1955)
- Feliks onnellinen (1958)
- The Secret of the Kingdom series:
  1. The Secret of the Kingdom (Valtakunnan salaisuus) (1959)
  2. The Roman (Ihmiskunnan viholliset) (1964)

=== Short story collections ===
- Kuolleen silmät. Kertomuksia tuntemattoman ovilta (1926, AKA Kristian Korppi)
- Dshinnistanin prinssi (1929)
- Kiinalainen kissa ja muita satuja (1932)
- Novelleja, AKA Nainen tuli pimeästä ja muita novelleja (1943). Contains 28 short stories:
  1. I Poikia:
    - "Herääminen"
    - "Pelkuri"
    - "Kiusaus"
    - "Salaseura "Hurjat hosujat"
    - "Oi, nuoruus"
  2. II Päivä paistaa:
    - "Nuori mies rakastaa"
    - "Suomalaista rakkautta"
    - "Kosto"
    - "Ensimmäinen vuosi on pahin"
    - "Mies ja hänen koiransa"
    - "Huviretki"
    - "Vanha mies herää kevääseen"
    - "Helsingin kevät"
  3. III Maa:
    - "Hannu Suolanhakijan tarina"
    - "Rauhaton taival"
    - "Omenapuut"
    - "Ihminen on hyvä"
    - "Huutokaupassa"
    - "Juhlapäivä"
    - "Mies kävelee talvista tietä"
  4. IV Kaupunki:
    - "Pimeä piha"
    - "Oli kerran pieni poika"
    - "Poika palaa kotiin"
    - "Äiti on sairas"
    - "Mies herää unesta"
    - "Hiilet hehkuvat"
    - "Uusi rakennusmaa"
  5. V Tuolta puolen:
    - "Nainen tuli pimeästä"
- Kuun maisema (1953). Contains 6 short stories:
  - "Jokin ihmisessä" (1944). Novella
  - "Jäinen saari"
  - "Moonscape" ("Kuun maisema"). Novella
  - "Ennen maailmanloppua"
  - "Pariisilaissolmio"
  - "Ihmisen vapaus"
- Koiranheisipuu ja neljä muuta pienoisromaania (1961). Contains 5 short stories:
  - "The Tree of Dreams" ("Koiranheisipuu")
  - "Ei koskaan huomispäivää!", AKA "Kevät uuden maailmansodan varjossa" (1942). Novella
  - "Kultakutri" (1948). Novella
  - "Fine van Brooklyn" (1941). Novella
  - "Sellaista ei tapahdu", AKA "Unohduksen pyörre" (1944). Novella
- Pienoisromaanit (1966). Contains 13 short stories:
  - "Multa kukkii" (1930). Novella
  - "Ei koskaan huomispäivää!", AKA "Kevät uuden maailmansodan varjossa" (1942). Novella
  - "Fine van Brooklyn" (1941). Novella
  - "Sellaista ei tapahdu", AKA "Unohduksen pyörre" (1944). Novella
  - "Jokin ihmisessä" (1944). Novella
  - "Nainen tuli pimeästä"
  - "Kultakutri" (1948). Novella
  - "Ennen maailmanloppua"
  - "Moonscape" ("Kuun maisema"). Novella
  - "Jäinen saari"
  - "Pariisilaissolmio"
  - "Ihmisen vapaus"
  - "The Tree of Dreams" ("Koiranheisipuu")
- Lukittu laatikko ja muita kertomuksia (1978)
- Joulutarinoita (1985). Contains 57 short stories:
  - "Kapinalliset naiset"
  - "Aili, Bonzo ja suuri saippuapallo"
  - "Eräs joululahja"
  - "Hentomielinen mies"
  - "Hiilet hehkuvat"
  - "Hirveä päivä"
  - "Hyvyys ja rauha"
  - "Hyvästi, Joulupukki..."
  - "Insinööri Jalovaaran uskomaton seikkailu"
  - "Isoäiti"
  - "Joulu"
  - "Joulu on jo ovella : leikkiä ja totta joulusta 1940"
  - "Joulu, ihmeellinen, palaamaton"
  - "Joulu, samettikoira ja minä"
  - "Jouluaatto, vuokra-auto ja onnellinen loppu"
  - "Jouluaattona"
  - "Joululahjasäkeitä"
  - "Joululaulu"
  - "Joululoma ja valokuva"
  - "Jouluna 1940"
  - "Joulutarina 1962"
  - "Jouluyö Atlas-vuorilla"
  - "Juhlapäivä"
  - "Kaikki on hyvin, mutta..."
  - "Kaksi pientä koiraa"
  - "Kamreeri Miettinen kertoo joululomastaan"
  - "Keittiömies Petterin onni"
  - "Kirjailijan joulu"
  - "Koti ja taivas"
  - "Kotiinpaluu"
  - "Maan viisaus"
  - "Merimiehen jouluilta"
  - "Myöhästyneet joululahjat"
  - "Nuoren Anttonin jouluaatto"
  - "Nuori Henrik"
  - "Pienen mustan koiran joulu"
  - "Pieni villipeto"
  - "Pikkujouluna kerromme sadun urhoollisesta Pörristä"
  - "Prinsessan joululahja"
  - "Rangaistuskomppanian joulu"
  - "Ratkaisun edessä"
  - "Rauhaton taival"
  - "Riimikronikka joulukirjoista"
  - "Satu Joulupukin suurimmasta salaisuudesta"
  - "Satu Kimistä ja Kaista, jotka matkustivat kuuhun elefantilla"
  - "Satu Pekasta ja äidin punaisesta huivista ja murheellisesta joulupukista"
  - "Taiteilijan joulu : satu aikuisille"
  - "Triest"
  - "Tuntematon tie"
  - "Tyttö katsoi äitiään"
  - "Täti Hortensian kaunein satu"
  - "Unelmien kude"
  - "Vaatimaton jouluruno"
  - "Vanha tietäjä"
  - "Vanhaisäntä käy kaupungissa"
  - "Yllätys isälle"
  - "Yö sairaalassa"
- Viisi ässää ja muita kertomuksia (1999)

=== Short stories ===
- "Satu kuninkaasta jolla ei ollut sydäntä" (1945)

=== Comics ===
- Kieku ja Kaiku (1979)

=== Poems ===
- Lauluja saatanalle (1926, AKA Untamo Raakki). Unpublished
- Sinun ristisi juureen (1927)
- Valtatiet (1928, with Olavi Lauri)
- Muukalaislegioona (1929)
- Sotatalvi (1940, with Yrjö Jylhä, Arvi Kivimaa, Viljo Kajava, Ragnar Ekelund, Lauri Viljanen, Otto Varhia)
- Runoja 1925-1945 (1945)
- 22.30 – Pikajuna Viipuriin (1966)
- Pöytälaatikko (1967)
- Mikan runoja ja muistiinpanoja 1925–1978 (1979)

=== Plays ===
- Tieteellinen teoria (1928)
- Jättiläiset ovat kuolleet (1930)
- Elämämme parhaat vuodet (1934)
- Yö yli Euroopan (1937)
- Akhnaton, auringosta syntynyt (1937)
- Kuriton sukupolvi (1937)
- Mies rakasti vaimoaan (1937)
- Toimittaja rakastaa (1937)
- Hämeenlinnan kaunotar (1939)
- Sotilaan paluu (1940)
- Maa on ikuinen (1941)
- Tulevaisuuden tiellä (1941)
- Hankala kosinta (1942)
- Yövieras (1943)
- Paracelsus Baselissa (1943)
- Gabriel, tule takaisin (1945)
- Rakas lurjus (1946)
- Elämän rikkaus (1947)
- Noita palaa elämään (1947)
- Omena putoaa (1947)
- Portti pimeään (1947)
- Huhtikuu tulee (1948)
- Kutsumaton (vieras) (1948)
- Myöhästynyt hääyö (1948)
- Viimeiset ihmiset (1950)
- Pimeä komero (1951)
- Miljoonavaillinki (1959)
- Isänmaan parhaat (1961)
- Keisari ja senaattori (1961)

=== Nonfiction ===
- Yksinäisen miehen juna (1929). Travels
- Siellä missä miehiä tehdään (1931). Description of the Finnish army
- Aiotko kirjailijaksi (1935)
- Neuvostovakoilun varjossa (1943)
- Lähdin Istanbuliin (1948). Travels
- Vallaton Waltari (1957). Artícles
- Ihmisen ääni (1978)
- Kirjailijan muistelmia (1980). Memoirs
- Mika Waltarin mietteitä (1982)
- Matkakertomuksia (1989). Travels
