= Tulenkantajat =

Finnish literary group of the 1920s

Tulenkantajat (″The Flame Bearers″) was a literary group in Finland during the 1920s. Their main task was to find a way to take Finland from so-called backwoods culture to the new, modern European level of literature. They did not consider their manifestos to form a program of any sort, but instead stated that their group was the "new feeling of life", building on humility, courage, and the sense of community. The group published their own magazine Tulenkantajat. The editorial of the first issue emphasized the group's unconnectedness to any political party, if not even apoliticism. However, less than a decade later the group disbanded partly due to political conflicts, as some members ended up being strictly on the left while others openly promoted the values of the Academic Karelia Society.

In the 1930s, Erkki Vala launched another Tulenkantajat magazine which he published from 1932 to 1939. Vala's magazine was more political compared to its predecessor.

== Positioning ==
The group's main motto was Ikkunat auki Eurooppaan ("Windows open to Europe") and its members visited Europe's major cities such as Paris, Rome, London, and Berlin. The young people who started Tulenkantajat in their early 20s ended up being important cultural characters in Finnish society. Tulenkantajat's poetry and prose received inspiration from oriental themes, jazz, city and industry life, as well as hedonism.

People are tired of viewing the world from hazy castles in the air like romantics, or from the grey surface of the earth like realists. That is why people want to see the world during a giddy, heart-rending leap of death high from above, through a strange perspective lasting only a wink of a moment - despite the risk that the salto mortale might not succeed, the head of the daring jumper being crushed against the paved street. A leap from the fifth floor is a fully conscious trick. It is not an accident or a whim of a madman, as is often believed. It has been performed by individuals who have wanted to expand the kingdom of art to include unmapped areas of the world of beauty. This area they have found, surprising with its richness, is called modern times.

— Olavi Paavolainen (1929)

== Notable members ==
Some of the best known members of Tulenkantajat were:

- Uuno Kailas
- Arvi Kivimaa
- Martti Haavio (pen name P. Mustapää)
- Yrjö Jylhä
- Olavi Paavolainen
- Ilmari Pimiä
- Nyrki Tapiovaara
- Elina Vaara
- Erkki Vala
- Katri Vala
- Mika Waltari
