= Juha (disambiguation) =

Juha is a masculine given name.

Juha may also refer to:

- Juha (novel), a 1911 novel by Juhani Aho
  - Juha (Merikanto), a 1922 opera based on the novel by Aarre Merikanto
  - Juha (Madetoja), a 1935 opera based on the novel by Leevi Madetoja
  - Juha (1937 film), a Finnish film adaptation directed by Nyrki Tapiovaara
  - Juha (1956 film), a Finnish film adaptation directed by Toivo Särkkä
  - Juha (1999 film), a Finnish film adaptation directed by Aki Kaurismäki
- Juha, Saudi Arabia, village in Jizan Province
- Olga Juha (born 1962), Hungarian retired high jumper
- Juha, a figure from Arabic folklore dating to the 9th century, now fused with the 13th-century Turkish wit and folklore character Nasreddin

== See also ==
- Juhan
- Juhana
- Juhani
