= Jurkka =

Jurkka is a Finnish surname. Notable people with the surname include:

- Emmi Jurkka (1899–1990), Finnish actress, and the mother of Jussi and Sakari
- Jussi Jurkka (1930–1982), Finnish actor
- Sakari Jurkka (1923–2012), Finnish actor
- Timo Jurkka (born 1963), Finnish actor

== See also ==
- Jurka
