= Frans Eemil Sillanpää =

Finnish writer (1888–1964)

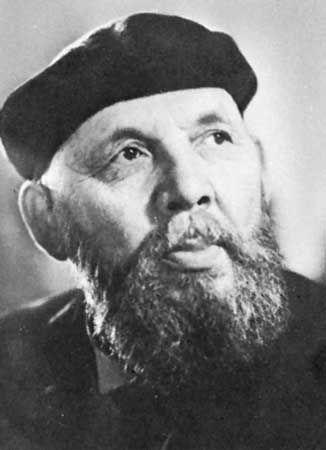
- Born: 16 September 1888; Hämeenkyrö, Finland
- Died: 3 June 1964 (aged 75); Helsinki, Finland
- Education: University of Helsinki
- Occupation: Writer
- Writing career
- Notable work: The Maid Silja
- Notable awards: 1939 Nobel Prize in Literature

Frans Eemil Sillanpää (Finnish: [frɑns ˈeːmil ˈsilːɑmˌpæː]; 16 September 1888 – 3 June 1964) was a Finnish writer. In 1939, he became the first Finnish writer to be awarded the Nobel Prize for Literature "for his deep understanding of his country's peasantry and the exquisite art with which he has portrayed their way of life and their relationship with Nature".

== Early life ==
Frans Eemil Sillanpää was born into a peasant farming family in Hämeenkyrö. Although his parents were poor, they managed to send him to school in Tampere. At school Sillanpää was a good student and with aid from his benefactor Henrik Liljeroos he entered the University of Helsinki in 1908 to study medicine. His acquaintances at university included the painters Eero Järnefelt and Pekka Halonen, composer Jean Sibelius and author Juhani Aho.

== Career ==
In 1913 Sillanpää moved from Helsinki to his old home village and devoted himself to writing. In 1914 Sillanpää wrote articles for the newspaper Uusi Suometar. In 1916 Sillanpää married Sigrid Maria Salomäki, whom he had met in 1914.

By principle, Sillanpää was against all forms of violence and believed in scientific optimism. In his work he portrayed rural people as living united with the land.

The novel Hurskas kurjuus (Meek Heritage) (1919) depicted the reasons for Finnish Civil War and was controversial at the time due to its objective approach.

Sillanpää won international fame for his novel Nuorena nukkunut (translated to English as The Maid Silja) in 1931.

In 1939, Sillanpää was awarded the Nobel Prize in Literature "for his deep understanding of his country's peasantry and the exquisite art with which he has portrayed their way of life and their relationship with Nature." A few days after he received the prize, talks between Finland and Soviet Union broke down and the Winter War began. Sillanpää traveled to Stockholm to receive the Nobel Prize and donated the golden medal to be melted for funds to aid the war effort.

Before the Winter War, Sillanpää wrote the lyrics for Sillanpään marssilaulu to lift his spirits when his eldest son Esko was partaking in military practices at Karelian Isthmus.

In 1939, Sillanpää's wife Sigrid died of pneumonia leaving him with eight children. Some time after, Sillanpää married his secretary Anna von Hertzen (1900–1983).

In 1941 Sillanpää divorced his wife Anna. His alcoholism and other ailments needed hospital treatment. In 1943 he returned to public life as a bearded old 'Grandpa Sillanpää'. His radio appearances, especially his tradition of speaking on Christmas Eve from 1945 to 1963 attracted listeners.

The asteroid 1446 Sillanpää, discovered on January 26, 1938, by Finnish astronomer and physicist Yrjö Väisälä, was named after him.

== Death ==
Sillanpää died on 3 June 1964 in Helsinki aged 75.

== Works ==
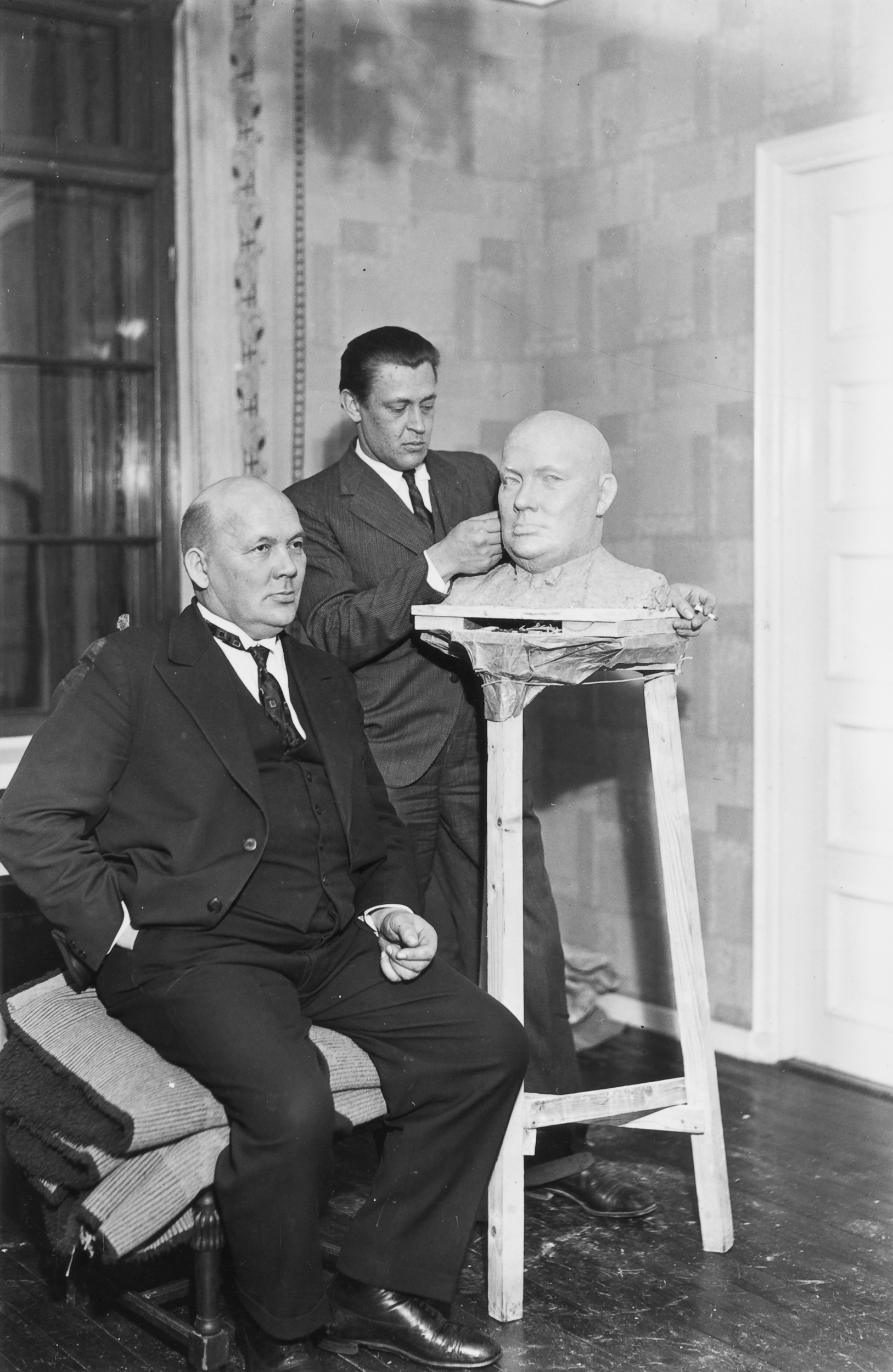
Sillanpää sitting for the sculptor Mauno Oittinen in 1931.

- Elämä ja aurinko (1916)
- Ihmislapsia elämän saatossa (1917)
- Hurskas kurjuus (translated as Meek Heritage) (1919)
- Rakas isänmaani (1919)
- Hiltu ja Ragnar (1923)
- Enkelten suojatit (1923)
- Omistani ja omilleni (1924)
- Maan tasalta (1924)
- Töllinmäki (1925)
- Rippi (1928)
- Kiitos hetkistä, Herra... (1930)
- Nuorena nukkunut (translated as The Maid Silja) (1931)
- Miehen tie (1932)
- Virranpohjalta (1933)
- Ihmiset suviyössä (translated as People in the Summer Night) (1934)
- Viidestoista (1936)
- Elokuu (1941)
- Ihmiselon ihanuus ja kurjuus (1945)

== Films ==
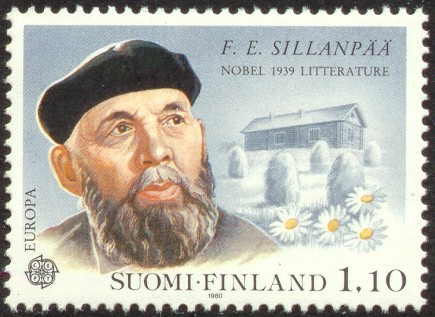
Poststamp released in 1980 in honour of Sillanpää.

Numerous of his works have been made into films:

- Nuorena nukkunut, Teuvo Tulio. 1937
- One Man's Faith, Nyrki Tapiovaara and Hugo Hytönen. 1940
- Ihmiset suviyössä, Valentin Vaala. 1948
- Poika eli kesäänsä, Roland af Hällström. 1955 (based on novel Elämä ja aurinko)
- The Harvest Month, Matti Kassila. 1956
- Silja – nuorena nukkunut, Jack Witikka. 1956
- The Glory and Misery of Human Life, Matti Kassila. 1988

== See also ==
- Juhani Aho
