= Ralph Enckell =

Finnish diplomat

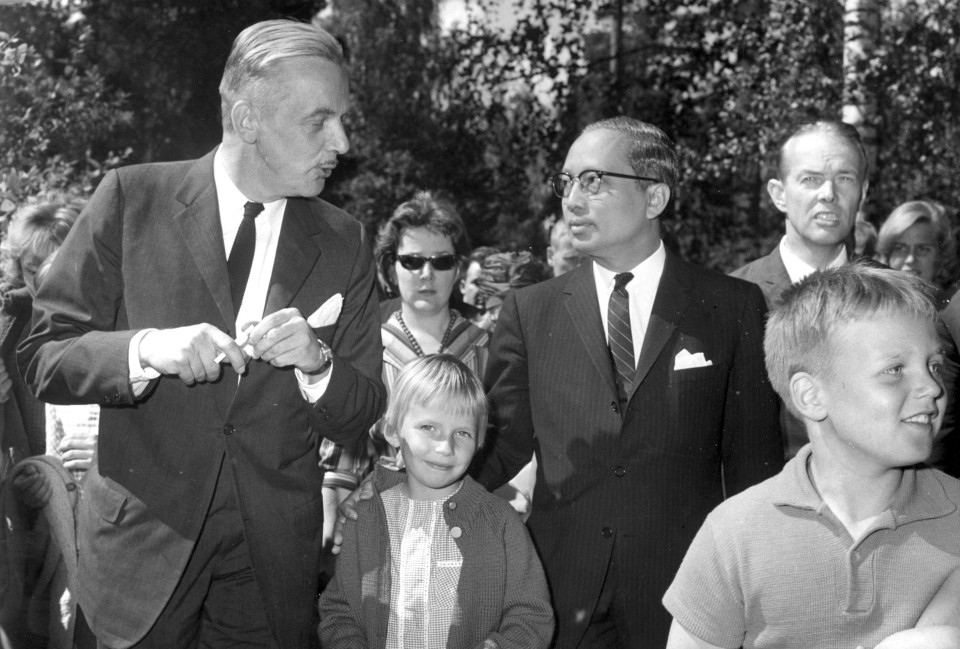
Ralph Enckell (left) hosts UN Secretary General U Thant during his visit in Finland in 1962.

Carl Fredrik Ralph Alexander Enckell (13 May 1913 – 18 May 2001) was a Finnish diplomat.

== Early life ==
Enckell was born in Helsinki into the Finnish cultural Enckell family, which traces its origins to Germany. Enckell was fluent in Swedish, Finnish, English, French and Russian. His language skills were largely acquired in his childhood home: his father, Carl Enckell, was a Swedish-speaking diplomat and English-born mother Lucy Marie Frieda Agathe Margareta Ponsonby-Lyons. Lieutenant General Oscar Enckell Academician Rabbe Enckell were his uncles.

During his father's career in Paris in the 1920s, Enckell attended a French school. While working in the 1950s at the Embassy of Finland in Moscow, Enckell studied Russian.

== Career ==
Enckell was employed by the Ministry for Foreign Affairs beginning in 1934. He was Secretary of State in Stockholm from 1944 to 1945, in Paris from 1945 to 1950 and in Moscow from 1950 to 1954, and as Head of the Political Department of the Ministry of Foreign Affairs between 1955 and 1959.

Enckell served as Permanent Representative of Finland to the United Nations from 1959 to 1965, Ambassador to Stockholm from 1965 to 1969, OECD Representation in Paris from 1969 to 1976, continued at the Finnish Embassy in Paris, at the same time in Unesco from 1972 to 1976 and in Warsaw from 1976 to 1980.

Ralph Enckell received the Special Envoy and Plenipotentiary title in 1957 and was honored as Honorary Professor of Political Science at the University of Turku in 1970.

Enckell was known in diplomatic circles as a colorful character. When the Vietnam War was criticized by the Swedish Minister of Education, later Prime Minister Olof Palme condemned the occupation of Czechoslovakia in 1968, Enckell categorically characterized the difference between the neutrality policy of Sweden and Finland: ”Finland seeks to manage its relations both east and west as well, Sweden as badly.” According to Ilkka Pastinen, Enckell was temperamental and demanding, emphasizing patriotism.

== Personal life ==
He married twice: to Marie-Christine Söderhjelm (1936-1948) and from 1949 until his death to Laura Virkkusen (Snellman until 1935).

Enckell starred under the pseudonym Ilmari Mänty in Nyrki Tapiovaara's film The Stolen Death in 1938.

Enckell died in Helsinki in 2001 at age 88. In 2013, one hundred years after his birth Enckell, a biography by Markku Reimaa was published, Magician of the Diplomacy.

== Recognition ==
- Order of the Lion of Finland (1978)
