= Juha (1956 film) =

- Original Finnish film poster
- Directed by: Toivo Särkkä
- Written by: Toivo Särkkä
- Based on: Juha by Juhani Aho
- Produced by: Toivo Särkkä
- Starring: Elina Pohjanpää; Eino Kaipainen; Veikko Uusimäki
- Cinematography: Osmo Harkimo; Kauno Laine
- Edited by: Armas Vallasvuo
- Music by: Tauno Pylkkänen
- Production company: Suomen Filmiteollisuus
- Release date: 9 November 1956
- Running time: 115 minutes
- Country: Finland
- Language: Finnish
- Budget: FIM 28,718,104

Juha (also known as Love Along a River) is a 1956 Finnish drama film produced, written, and directed by Toivo Särkkä. The film is based on a 1911 novel Juha by Juhani Aho, telling the story of the farm host Juha and his young wife Marja, whose usual everyday life is disrupted when a Karelian traveling merchant arrives and starts seducing the passionate Marja. The film stars Elina Pohjanpää, Eino Kaipainen and Veikko Uusimäki.

Juha is the first Finnish feature-length color film and also the first Finnish widescreen film.

== Plot ==
In a farm located in Finland during the time of Swedish rule, the strong and kind-hearted Juha (Eino Kaipainen) lives with his young and beautiful wife Marja (Elina Pohjanpää). One day, Shemeikka of Uhtua (Veikko Uusimäki), a merchant traveler from the White Karelia, arrives to visit Juha's house, paying attention to his young wife, and stays the night. Juha, who is significantly older than Marja, tells Shemeika in the sauna that Marja is an orphan whom Juha himself has raised as a mistress. During the evening, Shemeikka offers the host a drink and gets him to buy a beautiful scarf and buckle for Marja from Shemeikka.

The next morning, when Juha goes fishing, Shemeikka tries to seduce Marja and convince her to come with him to Karelia. Marja rejects him and Shemeikka, angry at this, leaves. However, Marja is unable to properly fight her own arousal towards Shemeikka, and when Juha's mean mother (Annie Mörk) happens to arrive at the scene scolding her daughter-in-law whom she deeply hates, Marja changes her mind and runs away after Shemeikka in a fit of emotion. Shemeikka is just rowing along the river towards Karelia, until Marja gets there and Shemeikka takes her on board. However, the farm maid Kaisa (Eila Pehkonen) sees this and tells Juha that Marja has been kidnapped, but later Juha learns the truth from her mother, that Marja herself has gone with Shemeikka on purpose. The shocked Juha believes that his mother is lying and starts to rage.

During that time, Shemeikka and Marja continue rowing along the river towards Karelia, while Marja lives in conflict with her own actions. Finally, they arrive at a Karelian fishing lodge, where they spend the night loving each other. Marja stays in the fishing lodge to wait for Shemeikka's occasional visits, until three young women show up, who reveal to Marja that they are Shemeikka's former "summer girls", who are part of the so-called Shemeikka's "harem". When Shemeikka finally arrives at the fishing lodge to party with other men, Marja gets confirmation that she is also one of Shemeikka's "summer girls" by eavesdropping on their conversations. Desperate Marja begins to argue with Shemeikka, who admits that it is true. Shemeikka also offers Marja to return to Juha, but Marja reveals that she is pregnant and expecting Shemeikka's child, and therefore does not dare to return to Juha.

Time passes. In the meantime, Marja has given birth to a baby boy for Shemeikka and her time is spent taking care of the child at Shemeikka's home in Uhtua. One day Shemeikka returns home and a big party is organized in his honor. Marja watches the situation from the sidelines, regretting her own fate. Then one day, Marja notices Juha, who has arrived by chance, who still hopes to find Marja. Marja hides in the room just as Juha peeks through the door, but after seeing a crying child in cradle, Juha doesn't step further into the room and thus doesn't know that he was very close to meeting Marja. Juha goes back to his home. However, seeing Juha at a glance rekindles Marja's feelings and she plans to return to Juha, but Shemeikka's mother (Kerstin Nylander) forbids her to take the boy with her, because the child is Shemeikka's property. In the end, Marja goes to Juha alone.

In the end, Marja arrives back at Juha's farm, where the hostile mother-in-law is facing her. However, Juha gets angry with his own mother and drives her away, happily taking his beloved Marja back home. When Juha inquires from Marja about what was done to her, Marja lies to Juha that she was unwillingly brought along with Shemeikka and that she had to experience violence, which makes furious Juha swear that he will kill Shemeikka. Marja reveals to Juha that she was in the very room from whose doorway Juha had seen a crying child. At first, she lies that the child was a slave girl from Shemeikka, whom Marja took care of, but finally she admits that the child is actually hers, but that she was not allowed to take it with her. Kind-hearted Juha wants to make Marja happy and promises to go with her to get her child from Karelia.

Marja returns to Shemeikka to pick up her child. Wondering about her disappearance, Shemeikka hears about her return and goes to receive her, but is surprised to see that Marja did not come alone but with Juha. Shemeikka reacts to the situation with mock amusement, until Juha goes berserk and knocks Shemeikka to the ground, at which point Marja takes child with her and runs away from the house. Juha threatens to kill Shemeikka with an axe, but after convincing Shemeikka and one of the "summer girls" Anja (Assi Nortia) that Marja was not kidnapped but actually went with Shemeika herself, Juha is shocked. He leaves the house, leaving Shemeikka alive. After reaching the boat on the river bank, Juha sees Marja with her child waiting for him and finally hears a confession from Marja; Marja had lied to Juha because she was scared to death of Juha's reaction.

Mentally beaten, Juha leaves to row his boat home, accompanied by Marja and her child. They arrive at the upper reaches of the rapids, where Juha leaves Marja with her child in order to be able to carry the boat to clearer waters. An exhausted Juha begins to see an image of Shemeikka in the water mockingly laughing at him, and Juha loses control of his boat, so he and his boat end up flowing along the bubbling rapids. Marja, who is following the situation from the river bank, is horrified when she sees that a boat plunges into the waves and Juha drowns. Marja is left alone with her child and they continue their journey home.

== Cast ==
- Elina Pohjanpää as Marja
- Eino Kaipainen as Juha
- Veikko Uusimäki as Shemeikka of Uhtua
- Annie Mörk as Juha's mother
- Kerstin Nylander as Shemeikka's mother
- Eila Pehkonen as Kaisa
- Assi Nortia as Anja
- Mirja Karisto as "summer girl"
- Outi Vahtera as "summer girl"

== Production ==
Producing a feature-length color film had already been part of T. J. Särkkä's plans for several years. As the subject of his first color film, he initially considered a 1944 novel Som tusen liljor by Waldemar Nyman and then a 1913 short story "Hilja the Milkmaid" by Johannes Linnankoski. In the winter of 1956, it was already publicly announced that a new film version of Aleksis Kivi's The Seven Brothers directed by Edvin Laine would be made as the first color film of Suomen Filmiteollisuus. In the end, however, it was decided to remake Juha, which was already made in 1937 by Nyrki Tapiovaara. Juha's color version was made possible by the success of Edvin Laine's The Unknown Soldier. The American Eastmancolor was chosen as the color method, whose nearest laboratory location was in Stockholm. In addition to color, Juha was the first Finnish feature film to be shot with anamorphic optics, using the AgaScope method borrowed from Sweden.

=== Filming ===
The film was shot between June and September in 1956. Most of Juha's outdoor scenes were shot in Kuusamo, as in Nyrki Tapiovaara's version 20 years earlier. In Tapiovaara's version, the whitewater rafter was Ilkka Mustonen, and in the newer version, his son Eino Mustonen was supposed to rafting instead of Veikko Uusimäki (who plays Shemeikka in the new version), but he refused to appear in the film for religious reasons. Journalist Jorma Kalevi, who was following the filming, told in Elanto magazine (22/1956) that the actors who practiced whitewater rafting during the bad weather for the filming, did their own rafting scenes. The schedule originally planned for two weeks of shooting in Kuusamo was extended to five weeks due to weather conditions.

Elsa Sylvestersson, ballet dancer of the Finnish National Opera, assisted in the party scene at Shemeikka's house, filmed in the studio of Suomen Filmiteollisuus.

For the Swedish market, a Swedish-languaged version of the film was shot at the same time, which was cut to half an hour shorter than the Finnish version.

== Release ==
In Finland, the film was premiered on 9 November 1959 in Helsinki, Oulu, Tampere and Turku. The premiere of the Swedish-language version of the film was in Sundsvall in January 1957; however, it was a poor success, and the film was not screened in Stockholm.

=== Critical response ===
In connection with the later television presentation of the film, criticism has stated that Särkkä's directing work does not live up to the level of the 1937 film adaptation directed by Nyrki Tapiovaara, as the narrative is "too actor-centric and theater-like". However, Elina Pohjanpää's performance as Marja has still been praised as impressive.

== See also ==
- Cinema of Finland
- List of Finnish films: 1950s
- Juha (1937 film), a 1937 adaptation of the same novel
- Juha (1999 film), a 1999 adaptation of the same novel
