= Runar Schildt =

Swedish-speaking Finnish author (1888–1925)

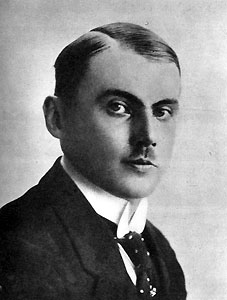
Runar Schildt

Ernst Runar Schildt (October 26, 1888, – September 29, 1925) was a Swedish-speaking Finnish author from Helsinki. His son was art historian and author Göran Schildt. Although Schildt wrote his books in Swedish, they have also been translated into Finnish, English, French and German.

Born in Helsinki, Runar Schildt debuted as a writer in 1912 with his first book, a collection of short stories called Den segrande Eros (The Victorious Eros). All in all, he wrote 33 short stories, of which 25 were published as books. His short stories have also been adapted for films, including Aapo, Galgmannen, The Stolen Death, and The Kiss of a Sparrow (directed by Claes Olsson). Schildt committed suicide in Helsinki in 1925, at the age of 36.

== A selection of Schildt's works ==
- Armas Fager
- Asmodeus och de tretton själarna samt tre noveller
- Den segrande Eros
- Den stora rollen
- En sparv i tranedans (which was made into the movie The Kiss of a Sparrow)
- Från Regnbågen till Galgmannen
- Från Rönnbruden till Häxskogen
- Galgmannen: en midvintersaga
- Häxskogen och andra noveller
- Hemkomsten och andra noveller
- Lyckoriddaren
- Perdita och andra noveller
