= The Stolen Death =

1938 Finnish film directed by Nyrki Tapiovaara

- Directed by: Nyrki Tapiovaara
- Screenplay by: Erik Blomberg; Matti Kurjensaari; Eino Mäkinen
- Based on: "The Meat-Grinder" by Runar Schildt
- Produced by: Erik Blomberg
- Cinematography: Erik Blomberg; Olavi Gunnari
- Edited by: Erik Blomberg; Nyrki Tapiovaara
- Music by: George de Godzinsky
- Release date: 4 September 1938
- Running time: 101 minutes
- Country: Finland
- Language: Finnish

The Stolen Death (Finnish: Varastettu kuolema) is a 1938 Finnish thriller film directed by Nyrki Tapiovaara. The story is set in the Grand Duchy of Finland in 1904, and is about a group of Finnish activists in Helsinki who develop into a revolutionary force for Finnish independence. The film is based on the 1919 short story "The Meat-Grinder" by Runar Schildt. Unlike the original story, the film is not set during the 1918 Finnish Civil War because of its sensitive subject at the time, but the events were set during the Russo-Japanese War instead.

The film was released on 4 September 1938.

== Cast ==
- Tuulikki Paananen as Manja
- Ilmari Mänty as Robert Hedman
- Santeri Karilo as Jonni Claesson
- Annie Mörk as madame Johansson
- Bertha Lindberg as Robert's mother
- Hertta Leistén as aunt
- Gabriel Tossu as shoemaker
- Jalmari Parikka as prison guard
- Aku Peltonen as morgue guard
- Atos Konst as Robert's comrade
- Viljo Kervinen as Robert's comrade
- Paavo Kuoppala as Robert's comrade
- Yrjö Salminen as Robert's comrade
- Kusti Laitinen as gendarme officer
- Emil Kokkonen as soldier
