= Juha (1937 film) =

1937 Finnish drama film

- Directed by: Nyrki Tapiovaara
- Based on: Juha by Juhani Aho
- Starring: Hannes Närhi; Irma Seikkula; Walle Saikko
- Release date: 24 January 1937
- Running time: 101 minutes
- Country: Finland
- Language: Finnish

Juha is a 1937 Finnish drama film directed by Nyrki Tapiovaara, starring Hannes Närhi, Irma Seikkula, and Walle Saikko. It is set in the 18th century and tells the story of a farmer who has married an orphan girl he raised and how a tradesman tries to get her to run away with him to Karelia. The film is based on Juhani Aho's 1911 novel of the same title.

The film was Tapiovaara's debut. It was released in Finland on 24 January 1937.

== Cast ==
- Hannes Närhi as Juha
- Irma Seikkula as Marja
- Walle Saikko as Shemeikka
- Tuulikki Paananen as Anja
- Aino Haverinen as Shemeikka's mother
- Ida Kuusela as Anoppi
- Hilma Vainikainen as Kaisa
- Kyllikki Väre as summer girl

== Reception ==
Pasi Nyyssönen wrote in the 2012 book Directory of World Cinema: Finland: "Tapiovaara, only 25-years-old when Juha was made, directs with a firm hand and a clear aesthetic vision. Aho's book is determinately translated into the visual language of cinema. The dialogue is reduced to a bare minimum, and the film is narrated poetically using visual symbolism of the natural environment."

== See also ==
- Juha, a 1956 adaptation of the same novel
- Juha, a 1999 adaptation of the same novel
