= Juha (Madetoja) =

Opera in three acts by Leevi Madetoja

- Opera by Leevi Madetoja
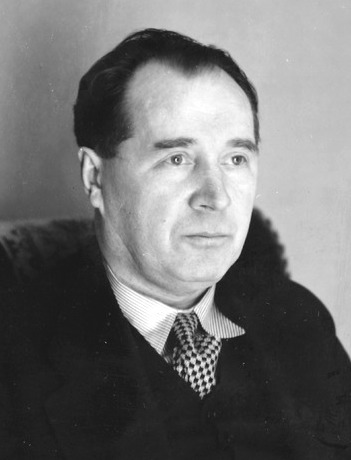
- The composer (c. 1937)
- Librettist: Leevi Madetoja & Aino Ackté
- Language: Finnish
- Based on: Juha by Juhani Aho
- Premiere: 17 February 1935; Finnish National Opera, Helsinki

Juha, Op. 74, is a verismo opera in three acts—comprising six tableaux—written from 1931 to 1934 by the Finnish composer Leevi Madetoja. The libretto, a collaboration between Madetoja and the Finnish soprano Aino Ackté, is based on Juhani Aho's 1911 novel by the same name. The story takes place on the border between West Karelia (Finno-Swedish territory) and East Karelia (Russian territory), and features as its central conflict a love triangle between the farmer Juha, his young wife Marja, and a Karelian merchant, Shemeikka. Disillusioned with rural life and seduced by promises of material comfort and romance, Marja runs away with Shemeikka; Juha, who maintains his wife has been abducted, eventually discovers her betrayal and commits suicide by jumping into the rapids.

On 17 February 1935, the Helsinki Philharmonic Orchestra premiered the work at the Finnish National Opera under the baton of Armas Järnefelt. Although a success at its premiere, Juha failed to match the popularity of Madetoja's first opera, The Ostrobothnians; enthusiasm quickly faded and the inaugural production was discontinued in February 1938, after 13 performances. Despite two mini-revivals in Madetoja's lifetime, he considered it the greatest disappointment of his career. Today, the opera is rarely performed and has been supplanted in the operatic repertoire by Aarre Merikanto's modernist 1922 version (first performed in 1963), which is based upon the same libretto.

== History ==
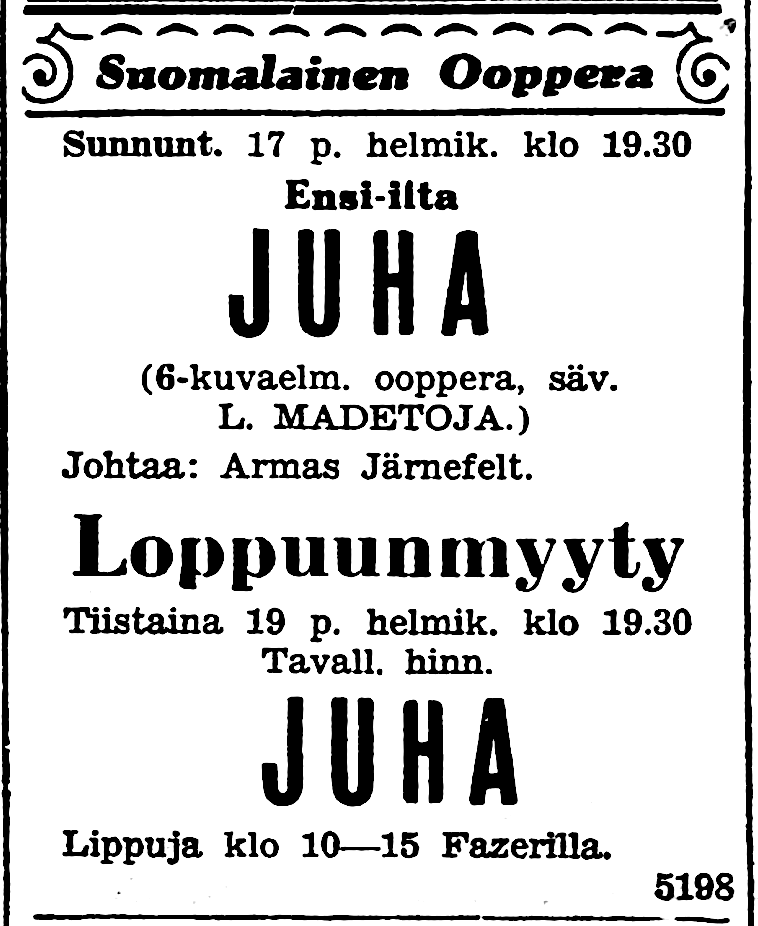
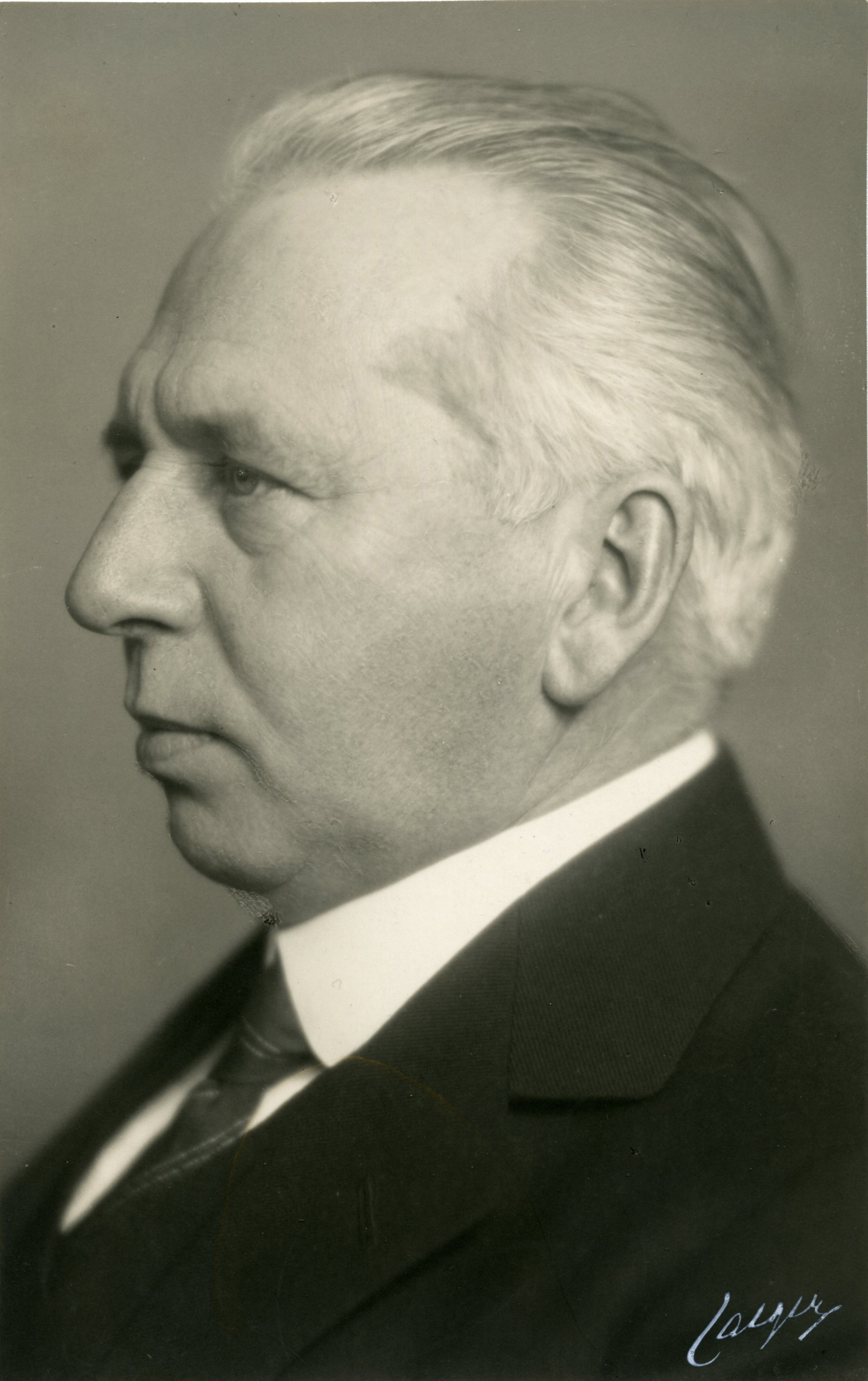
An advertisement promoting the 17 February 1935 premiere of Madetoja's Juha; Armas Järnefelt conducted the premiere.

For Madetoja, the 1930s brought hardship and disappointment. During this time, he was at work on two new major projects: a second opera, Juha, and a fourth symphony, each to be his final labor in their respective genres. The former, with a libretto by the famous Finnish soprano, Aino Ackté (adapted from the 1911 novel by writer Juhani Aho), had fallen to Madetoja after a series of events: first, Sibelius—ever the believer in "absolute music"—had refused the project in 1914; (Note: According to Tawaststjerna, Ackté and Aho had first offered the libretto to Sibelius in November 1912, as Ackté had "felt confident that he [Sibelius] would produce something that was both powerful and refined". Interested but noncommittal, Sibelius promised a firm answer within two years. To Ackté's disappointment, Sibelius declined the project in October 1914, finding its "rural verismo uncongenial" and wishing to focus on his Fifth Symphony.) and, second, in 1922, the Finnish National Opera had rejected a first attempt by Aarre Merikanto as "too Modernist" and "too demanding on the orchestra", leading the composer to withdraw the score. (Note: According to Korhonen, while the 1920s featured the rise of Modernism in Finnish music, the national Romanticism was "still alive and well. Sibelius, Melartin, and Madetoja were at the height of their creative powers, and they were admired by the public at large". As such, many Modernist compositions were criticized by critics and a "hostile ... suspicious" public. Many others, were not even performed, "hidden in desk drawers". Merikanto, an emerging modernist composer, likely received the Juha libretto from Ackté around 1920 and, after a "high state of inspiration", completed his score in the winter of 1921. After making revisions to the score in January 1922, Merikanto submitted the work to the board of the Finnish National Opera in the spring. Their rebuke stung Merikanto, and his Juha remained unperformed until 1963 in Lahti, five years after his death.) Two failures in, Ackté thus turned to Madetoja, the successful The Ostrobothnians of whom was firmly ensconced in the repertoire, to produce a safer, more palatable version of the opera.

The death of Madetoja's mother, Anna, on 26 March 1934, interrupted his work on the opera; the loss so devastated Madetoja that he fell ill and could not travel to Oulu for the funeral. (Note: In 1939, Madetoja published his Second Symphony (1918) using the inheritance money from his mother's death to cover the printing costs; as a tribute, he retroactively dedicated the work to her.) Madetoja completed work on the opera by the end of 1934 and it premiered to considerable fanfare at the Finnish National Opera on 17 February 1935, the composer's forty-eighth birthday. The critics hailed it as a "brilliant success", an "undisputed masterpiece of Madetoja and Finnish opera literature". Nevertheless, the "euphoria" of the initial performance eventually wore off and, to the composer's disappointment, Juha did not equal the popularity of The Ostrobothnians. Indeed, today Juha is most associated with Merikanto, whose modernist Juha (which the Finnish National Opera performed on 19 October 1967) is the more enduringly popular of the two; having been displaced by Merikanto's, Madetoja's Juha is rarely performed.

== Roles ==
Juha comprises a cast of eleven roles, of which five are for male and six are for female voice types; tableaux 4–6 also include mixed choir. The principal characters are Juha (baritone), his wife Marja (soprano), and her seducer Shemeikka (tenor).

Roles, character descriptions, voice types, premiere performers
Roles	Character description	Appearances	Voice type	Premiere cast 17 February 1935
Juha	A backwoods Finnish farmer and the husband of Marja	Tableaux 1, 3, 6	baritone	Toivo Louko
Marja	Juha's young wife	Tableaux 1–2, 4, 6	soprano	Irja Aholainen
Shemeikka of Uhtua	A proposperous Karelian peddler	Tableaux 1–2, 4–6	tenor	Alfons Almi
The Mother-in-law (Anoppi)	Juha's mother	Tableaux 1, 3	contralto	Lahja Linko
Kaisa	A servant girl on Juha's farm	Tableaux 1, 3	soprano	Karin Ehder
The Vicar (Rovasti)	The parish clergyman who married Juha and Marja	Tableau 3	bass	Bruno Jorma
Anja	A former summer sweetheart of Shemeikka's	Tableaux 4, 6	soprano	Mary Hannikainen
First girl (Ensimäinen tyttö)	A former summer sweetheart of Shemeikka's	Tableau 4	soprano	Airi Osa
Second girl (Toinen tyttö)	A former summer sweetheart of Shemeikka's	Tableau 4	contralto	Martta Seppälä
First man (Ensimäinen mies)	A companion in Shemeikka's entourage	Tableaux 4–6	tenor	Emil Mantila
Second man (Toinen mies)	A companion in Shemeikka's entourage	Tableaux 4–6	bass	Erkki Eklund
Chorus	Men and women in Shemeikka's entourage	Tableaux 4–6	SATB	?

== Synopsis ==
Juha and Marja's homeland is the historical Finnish province of Karelia (in blue), then under Swedish rule. Shemeikka's Russian Karelia (not pictured) borders to the east.

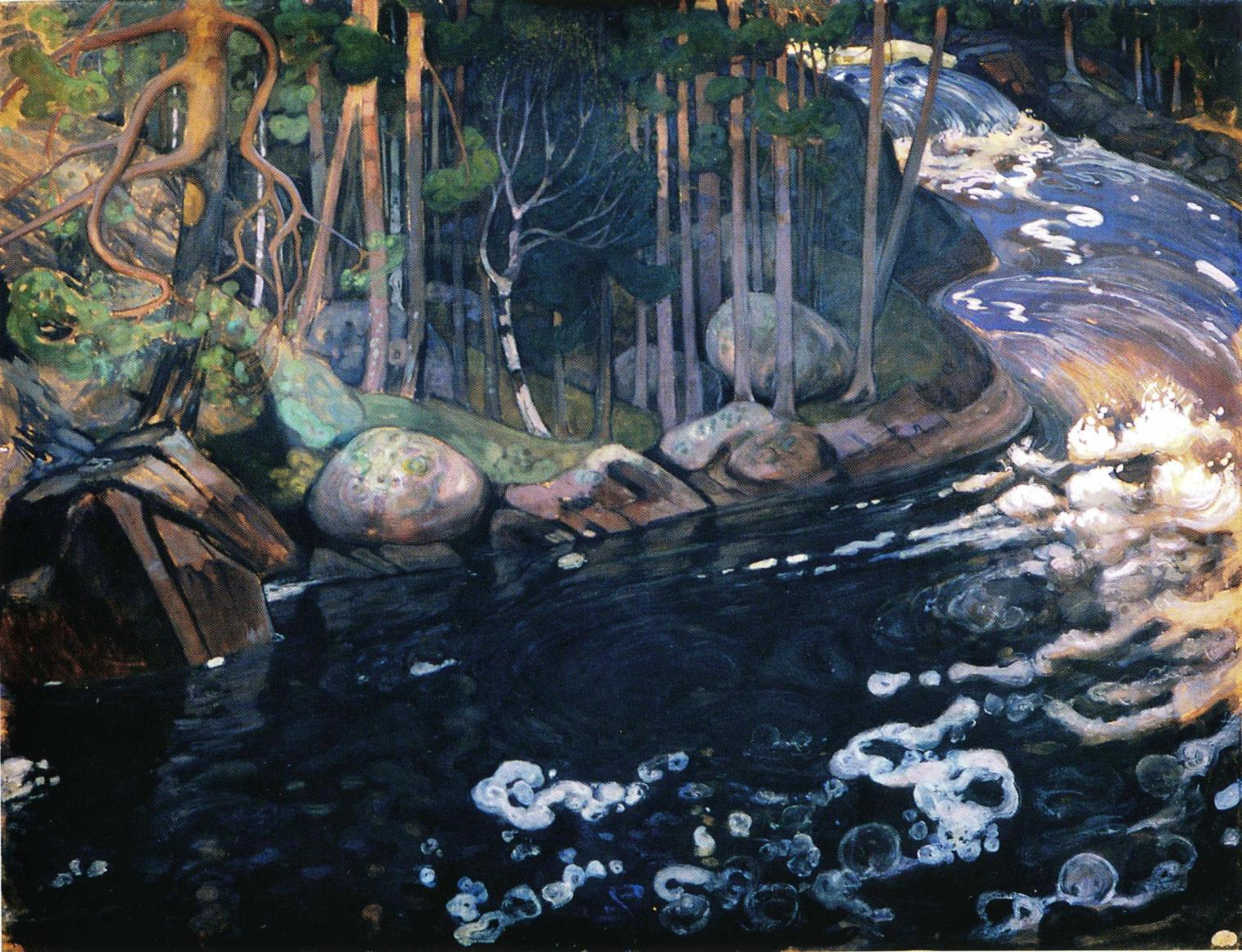
Rapids are a recurring plot point in Juha: over them, Marja escapes with Shemeikka; and in them, a ruined Juha downs himself.

=== Act 1 ===
Tableau 1

Juha's cottage in Finnish Karelia, near the border

- Juha and Marja are arguing once again; the Marja is unhappy living with the old Juha
- She threatens to throw herself into the rapids
- Shemeikka, the Karelian peddler, arrives at Juha's cottage asking if Juha has rye to sell
- As Juha goes to the storehouse, Shemeikka flirts with the beautiful Marja
- He assumes she is Juha's daughter or maid, and is shocked to discover she is his wife
- Shemeikka earns Juha's trust by accepting a good price for the rye; he is offered lodging for the night
- Shemeikka sells Juha a silk scarf and golden broach to give to Marja; he accepts far below the market price
- Secretly, Shemeikka finds Marja and steals a kiss; he asks he to come with him to Karelia
- Marja refuses, but when she encounters her Mother-in-law, they argue; Marja threatens to leave with the handsome merchant
- Marja runs down to the rapids, which Shemeikka is departing and climbs "gladly" into his boat
- Kaisa, Juha's maid, runs to her master, screaming that Marja has been abducted

Tableau 2

Shemeikka's fishing cottage, on an island in the rapids

=== Act 2 ===
Tableau 3

Juha's cottage

Tableau 4

Shemeikka's fishing cottage

=== Act 3 ===
Tableau 5

Shemeikka's house in Russian Karelia

- Serves as a short divertissement in which the men and women of Shemeikka's household sing and dance.
- A feast is prepared in honor of Shemeikka's return.

Tableau 6

Shemeikka's house

- Marja feeling sad, rues her fate
- Anja tells her to put on her best clothes for the feast
- Marja refuses and decides she is going to return to Juha
- Juha arrive at Shemeikka's household and finds Marja
- He confronts Shemeikka for abducting Marja and murders him in revenge
- Anja, devastated, screams that Marja "went gladly", which Marja confirms to Juha
- Juha accuses Marja of having made him a murder with her lies
- Without any reason now to live, he throws himself into the rapids

== Recordings ==
Full opera

Only one commercial recording is available of Madetoja's Juha. It is by the Finnish conductor Jussi Jalas and the Finnish Radio Symphony Orchestra, having been produced in 1977 by the Finnish Broadcasting Company for Yle TV1. In 1998, Ondine released this performance as a CD.

Conductor	Orchestra	Marja	Shemeikka	Juha	Choir	Rec. (Note: Refers to the year in which the performers recorded the work; this may not be the same as the year in which the recording was first released to the general public.)	Time	Recording venue	Label	Ref.
Jussi Jalas	Finnish Radio Symphony Orchestra	Maija Lokka	Eero Erkkilä	Jorma Hynninen	Finnish Radio Youth Choir	1977	98:59	Kulttuuritalo	Ondine	(Note: J. Jalas–Ondine (ODE 714–2) 1998)

Derivative works

In 1934, Madetoja excerpted from Juha two numbers for orchestra: Tragic Episode (Traagillinen episodi) and Rapids Shooting (Koskenlasku). The first number is derived from the opera's overture, whereas the second number is drawn from the orchestra music that occurs between Tableaux 1 and 2. In 1998, Arvo Volmer and the Oulu Symphony Orchestra made the world premiere recordings of Tragic Episode and Rapids Shooting.

Conductor	Orchestra	Rec.	Time	Recording venue	Label	Ref.
Arvo Volmer	Oulu Symphony Orchestra	1998	11:34	Oulu Music Center	Alba	(Note: A. Volmer–Alba (ABCD 132) 2000)

Writing for MusicWeb International, Rob Barnett argues that the two Juha excerpts—with their "overhung tragedy and whiplash attack"—are "seriously attractive pieces of music". He concludes that two pieces likely will make their listener "want to catch" Juha in its entirety. A similarly positive review ran in the American Record Guide, with Tom Godell describing Tragic Episode and Rapids Shooting as "remarkable interludes ... [that] powerfully convey the complex, seething emotions of the central characters".

== Notes, references, and sources ==
Notes

Sources

- Barnett, Rob (2000). "Leevi Madetoja: Vol. 1 complete orchestral works". musicweb-international.com. MusicWeb International.
- Godell, Tom (2001). "Madetoja: Symphony 1; Concert Overture; Pastoral Suite; Rustic Scenes (Alba 144) / Symphony 2; Ostrobothnians Suite; Juha (excerpts) (Alba 132)". American Record Guide. 64 (2). Record Guide Publications: 126–127. (subscription required)
- Korhonen, Kimmo (2007). Inventing Finnish Music: Contemporary Composers from Medieval to Modern. Finnish Music Information Center (FIMIC). ISBN 978-952-5076-61-5.
- Pulliainen, Riitta (2000). Madetoja Orchestral Works 1: I Have Fought My Battle (booklet). Arvo Volmer & Oulu Symphony Orchestra. Tampere, Finland: Alba. p. 4–6. ABCD 132.
- Pulliainen, Riitta (2001). Madetoja Orchestral Works 4: Laurel Wreaths (booklet). Arvo Volmer & Oulu Symphony Orchestra. Tampere, Finland: Alba. p. 4–8. ABCD 162.
- Salmenhaara, Erkki (1987). Leevi Madetoja (in Finnish). Helsinki: Tammi. ISBN 951-30-6725-4.
- Tawaststjerna, Erik (1986). Sibelius: Volume 2, 1904–1914. (Robert Layton, English translation). London: Faber and Faber.
- Tawaststjerna, Erik (1997). Sibelius: Volume 3, 1914–1957. (Robert Layton, English translation). London: Faber and Faber.
