= Veikko Uusimäki =

Finnish actor

- Veikko Uusimäki
- Born: Veikko Johannes Uusimäki; 26 January 1921; Kurikka, Finland
- Died: 25 May 2008 (aged 87); Helsinki, Finland
- Occupation: Actor
- Years active: 1946–1998

Veikko Johannes Uusimäki (26 January 1921 – 25 May 2008) was a Finnish actor and theater councilor. During his life, he acted in a total of 25 films, in connection with which he also served as director of Yleisradio's theater services between 1973 and 1987. In 1973, Uusimäki was awarded the Pro Finlandia Medal of the Order of the Lion of Finland.

Inari Uusimäki, the daughter of Veikko Uusimäki, is a Finnish radio and TV journalist.

== Selected filmography ==
- Sleeping Beauty (1949)
- At the Rovaniemi Fair (1951)
- The Unknown Soldier (1955)
- Juha (1956)
- Vodka, Inspector Palmu (1969)
- Trust (1976)
- Ariel (1988)
