= Jalmari Parikka =

Finnish actor (1891–1959)

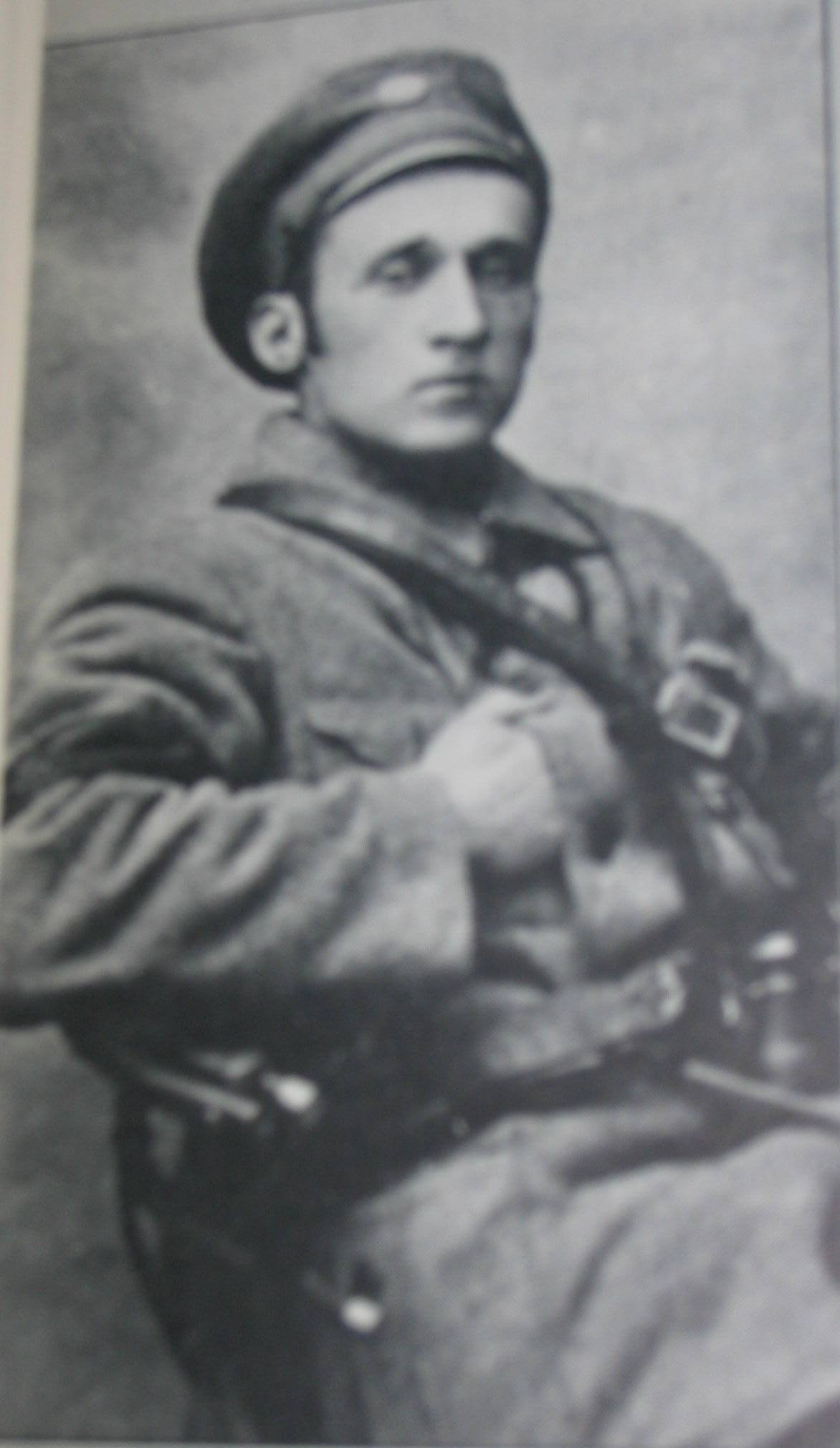
- Jalmari Parikka as a Red Guard commander in 1918.
- Born: 16 October 1891; Sortavala, Grand Duchy of Finland
- Died: 27 March 1959 (aged 67); Helsinki, Finland

Hjalmar Fabian Parikka (16 October 1891 – 27 March 1959) was a Finnish revolutionary soldier, actor and artistic director.

== Life ==
Jalmari Parikka was born in the Eastern Finnish town of Sortavala and went to school in the Russian capital Saint Petersburg. Parikka started his acting career in 1910 as a member of a touring theatre in Kajaani, where he had learned the profession of a typesetter. As the 1918 Finnish Civil War broke out, Parikka was head the Worker's Theatre in Enso. Soon he was named as the commander of the local Red Guard. During the Battle of Vyborg, Parikka was one of the Red Guard leaders in charge of the city's defense. He was captured by the Whites and sentenced to death, which was later turned into life in prison. After the 1921 general pardon, Parikka worked as an artistic director in the Worker's Theatres of Pori and Vyborg and the theaters of Mikkeli and Vaasa. Since the late 1920s he was an actor in the Vyborg City Theater. Between 1938 and 1958 Parikka made more than 50 film appearances.

== Selected filmography ==
- The Stolen Death (1938)
- Mr. Lahtinen Takes French Leave (1939)
- Two Henpecked Husbands (1939)
- One Man's Faith (1940)
- Kulkurin valssi (1941)
- Rosvo-Roope (1949)
- The Witch (1952)
- The Face in the Mirror (1953)
- Adventure in Morocco (1953)
- Pekka ja Pätkä lumimiehen jäljillä (1954)
