= Sillanpään marssilaulu =

Single by Eero Väre, Heinz Munsonius, Ja Kristalli-Orkesteri
- Language: Finnish
- English title: Sillanpää’s March
- A-side: "Kaipaava"
- Written: 1939
- Released: 1940
- Genre: Military march
- Label: Kristall
- Composer: Aimo Mustonen
- Lyricist: Frans Eemil Sillanpää

Sillanpään marssilaulu (Finnish) is a Finnish patriotic song composed by Aimo Mustonen, with words by Frans Emil Sillanpää.

A few months before the start of Winter War, the Finnish Army held extra war training for its troops. One day, Sillanpää watched as some troops passed his house, singing a quite non-military song Maailman Matti. Sillanpää became frustrated, he wondered why the Finnish soldiers did not sing something more fitting to the age of war they lived. Almost immediately, he wrote new, far more patriotic words to the Maailman Matti theme. The new words of Maailman Matti were published by the Suomen Kuvalehti-magazine, catching the eye of captain Palmroth of the Finnish Defence Forces. Palmroth immediately recognized the potential of the song, thinking it was perfect for raising the morale of the Finnish forces. He quickly organized a composing contest to create a more fitting theme for Sillanpää's song. Rising out of obscurity was Aimo Mustonen, winning over many well-known composers. The coming of winter war proved Palmroth's instinct correct, as Sillanpään marssilaulu became a huge success among the Finnish troops.

While serving in certain units of the Finnish Army, conscripts are required to learn the lyrics. One such unit is the Reconnaissance Company of the Reserve Officer School in Hamina. Whenever the unit is moving in formation the officer students are required to sing Sillanpään marssilaulu.
