= Kaksi Vihtoria =

1939 Finnish comedy film

- Directed by: Nyrki Tapiovaara
- Based on: Klaara ja hänen Vihtorinsa by Tatu Pekkarinen
- Release date: 5 February 1939
- Running time: 110 minutes
- Country: Finland
- Language: Finnish

Kaksi Vihtoria (English-language title: Two Henpecked Husbands) is a 1939 Finnish comedy film directed by Nyrki Tapiovaara. It is based on Tatu Pekkarinen's play Klaara ja hänen Vihtorinsa, which in turn is based on the American comic strip Bringing Up Father. The film was released on 5 February 1939.

Klaara and Vihtori were the Finnish names of Maggie and Jiggs from the comic strip Bringing Up Father.

== Cast ==
- Annie Mörk as Klaara Rantamo
- Sointu Kouvo as Hilkka Rantamo
- Eino Jurkka as Vihtori Rantamo
- Arvi Tuomi as Vihtori Hiltunen
- Helmer Kaski as Robert Hokkanen
- Irja Rannikko as Augusta
- Jalmari Parikka as Old Karelian man
- Hertta Leistén as Innkeeper
- Lida Salin as Miina
- Varma Lahtinen as Mandi
