= Juha (novel) =

1911 novel by Juhani Aho

- Cover of the first Finnish edition
- Author: Juhani Aho
- Language: Finnish
- Genre: Novel
- Publisher: Otava
- Publication date: April 10, 1911; 115 years ago
- Pages: 266
- ISBN: 951-717-799-2

Juha is a novel by Finnish writer Juhani Aho, published in 1911. It is considered one of Aho's most important works: after its publication, Aho consolidated his role as the "national writer" of Finland. The novel is at once characterized as one of his most classical and most modern works. Although taking the form of an epic, Juha does not lack drama in its plot.

Mathias Taube played Juha in Stiller's 1921 film, Hannes Närhi in Tapiovaara's 1937 film, Eino Kaipainen in Särkkä's 1956 film and Sakari Kuosmanen in Kaurismäki's 1999 film. Based on Juha, Mikko Roiha directed a dance theater work of the same name, which premiered at Korjaamo in January 2010.

== Plot ==
Shemeikka, a travelling merchant from White Karelia, seduced Juha's wife Marja. Marja left Juha's household in Swedish Finland with Shemeikka to Russian Karelia, where she found his "harem" with many other women serving in near slavery.

Marja lost favour with Shemeikka, despite giving birth to his child. She succeeded in returning to Finland. Juha believed she was abducted. When they went to Russia to retrieve her child, Juha assaulted Shemeikka, who explained that Marja left of her own will.

== Adaptations ==
- Mauritz Stiller: film Johan, 1921
- Aarre Merikanto: opera Juha, written 1922, premiered 1958.
- Leevi Madetoja: opera Juha, written 1931–34, premiered 1935.
- Nyrki Tapiovaara: film Juha (1937)
- Toivo Särkkä: film Juha (1956)
- Aki Kaurismäki: silent film Juha (1999).
- Mikko Roiha: dance piece Juha, January 2010.
