= One Man's Fate =

1940 Finnish film directed by Nyrki Tapiovaara

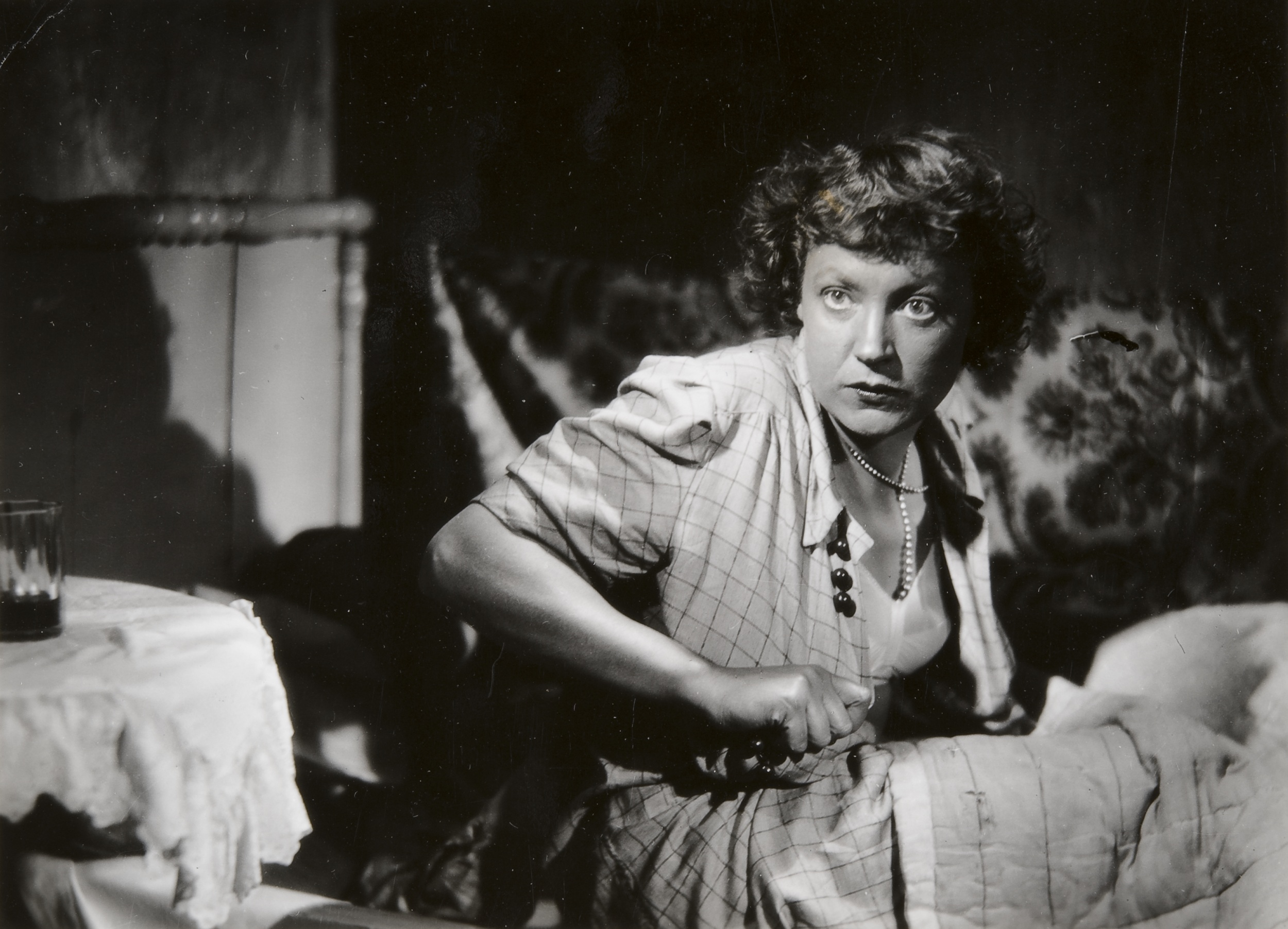
- Emmi Jurkka as Tussan Lyyti in One Man's Fate
- Directed by: Hugo Hytönen; Nyrki Tapiovaara
- Screenplay by: Frans Eemil Sillanpää; Nyrki Tapiovaara
- Based on: Miehen tie by Frans Eemil Sillanpää
- Produced by: Erik Blomberg
- Cinematography: Erik Blomberg
- Edited by: Erik Blomberg
- Music by: George de Godzinsky
- Release date: 1 September 1940
- Running time: 93 minutes
- Country: Finland
- Language: Finnish

One Man's Fate (Finnish: Miehen tie) is a 1940 Finnish drama film directed by Hugo Hytönen and Nyrki Tapiovaara and starring Gunnar Hiilloskorpi, Mirjami Kuosmanen, and Hytönen. It follows the downward spiral of the farmer Paavo after his wife dies in childbirth, her family reclaims their dowry, and he resorts to drinking. It is based on the 1932 novel of the same title by Frans Eemil Sillanpää, who also co-wrote the screenplay with Tapiovaara.

The film was Tapiovaara's last. He left the film unfinished when he—after several rejections due to his left-wing political background—was accepted into the Finnish army and died in the Winter War. The film was finished by the producer Erik Blomberg, Blomberg's wife Kuosmanen, and the actor and director Hytönen.

The film was shot between the winter of 1939 and the summer of 1940 in Hämeenkyrö and Tampere. It was released on 1 September 1940.

== Cast ==
- Gunnar Hiilloskorpi as Ahrolan Paavo
- Mirjami Kuosmanen as Vormiston Alma
- Hugo Hytönen as Vihtori Taatila
- Helvi Järveläinen as Hulda Tiirikka
- Annie Mörk as Granny
- Emmi Jurkka as Tussan Lyyti
- Onni Veijonen as Pietilän Iivari
- Hertta Leistén as Pälä's wife
- Simo Osa as Jaskari
- Jalmari Parikka as Pälä
- Arvi Tuomi as Otti
