= Mr. Lahtinen Takes French Leave =

1939 Finnish comedy film

- Finnish: Herra Lahtinen lähtee lipettiin
- Directed by: Nyrki Tapiovaara
- Based on: Melodien der blev væk by Kjeld Abell
- Release date: 1939
- Running time: 77 minutes
- Country: Finland
- Language: Finnish

Mr. Lahtinen Takes French Leave (Finnish: Herra Lahtinen lähtee lipettiin) is a 1939 Finnish comedy film directed by Nyrki Tapiovaara. It is based on the Danish play Melodien der blev væk by Kjeld Abell. The film was released on 10 September 1939.

The film is partly lost. Only around 43 minutes (of the original 77) from the middle have been preserved.

== Cast ==
- Fritz-Hugo Backman as Mr. Lahtinen
- Märtha Jaatinen as Edit Lahtinen
- Hertta Leistén as Mother-in-law
- Lauri Korpela as Kaarlo
- Liisa Nevalainen as Second Ms. Salminen
- Rosi Rinne as First Ms. Salminen
- Antti Halonen as Lord Roqueford
- Henake Schubak as Street singer
- Jalmari Parikka as Newsvendor Lahtinen
