= 1446 Sillanpää =

Stony Florian asteroid

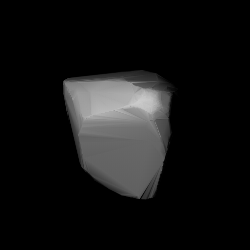
- Shape of Sillanpää modelled from its lightcurve

Discovery
- Discovered by: Y. Väisälä
- Discovery site: Turku Obs.
- Discovery date: 26 January 1938

Designations
- Named after: Frans Sillanpää (writer)
- Alternative designations: 1938 BA · 1935 GB; 1952 HQ_{3} · 1955 DQ; 1965 EA
- Minor planet category: main-belt · Flora

Orbital characteristics
- Epoch 16 February 2017 (JD 2457800.5)
- Uncertainty parameter 0
- Observation arc: 78.53 yr (28,683 days)
- Aphelion: 2.4732 AU
- Perihelion: 2.0179 AU
- Semi-major axis: 2.2455 AU
- Eccentricity: 0.1014
- Orbital period (sidereal): 3.37 yr (1,229 days)
- Mean anomaly: 98.112°
- Mean motion: 0° 17^{m} 34.44^{s} / day
- Inclination: 5.2572°
- Longitude of ascending node: 17.549°
- Argument of perihelion: 196.25°

Physical characteristics
- Dimensions: 7.35±0.29 km 8.167±0.154 km 8.19 km (calculated); 8.763±0.063 km
- Synodic rotation period: 9.65855±0.00005 h 9.659±0.001 h 9.6597±0.0172 h 9.6602±0.0008 h (Note: Pravec (2009) web: rotation period 9.6602±0.0008 hours with a brightness amplitude of 0.55 mag. Summary figures at Collaborative Asteroid Lightcurve Link (CALL) for (1446) Sillanpaa and Pravec, P.; Wolf, M.; Sarounova, L. (2009))
- Geometric albedo: 0.2109±0.0108; 0.24 (assumed); 0.241±0.046; 0.327±0.080
- Spectral type: S
- Absolute magnitude (H): 12.394±0.002 (R) · 12.50 · 12.6

1446 Sillanpää, provisional designation 1938 BA, is a stony Florian asteroid from the inner regions of the asteroid belt, approximately 8.2 kilometers in diameter. It was discovered on 26 January 1938, by Finnish astronomer Yrjö Väisälä at Turku Observatory in Southwest Finland. It was later named after writer Frans Eemil Sillanpää.

== Orbit and classification ==
The S-type asteroid is a member of the Flora family, one of the largest populations of stony asteroids in the main-belt. It orbits the Sun at a distance of 2.0–2.5 AU once every 3 years and 4 months (1,229 days). Its orbit has an eccentricity of 0.10 and an inclination of 5° with respect to the ecliptic. Sillanpää was first identified as 1935 GB at Simeiz Observatory in 1935, while its observation arc begins with its official discovery observation at Turku in 1938.

== Lightcurves ==
In March 2009, Czech astronomer Petr Pravec obtained a rotational light-curve from photometric observations at Ondřejov Observatory. (Note: Light-curve analysis: screenshot) It gave a well-defined rotation period of 9.6602 hours with a brightness variation of 0.55 magnitude (U=3). One month later, a concurring period of 9.659 hours with an amplitude of 0.71 magnitude was obtained by Adrián Galád at Modra Observatory (U=3). Photometric observations at the Palomar Transient Factory in December 2011. gave a 9.6597 hours and Δ0.59 in magnitude (U=2). A modeled light-curve using data from the Uppsala Asteroid Photometric Catalogue and other data sources, gave a period of 9.65855 hours, as well as a spin axis of (129.0°, 76.0°) in ecliptic coordinates (U=n.a.).

== Diameter and albedo ==
According to the survey carried out by NASA's Wide-field Infrared Survey Explorer with its subsequent NEOWISE mission, Sillanpää measures between 7.35 and 8.76 kilometers in diameter, and its surface has an albedo between 0.21 and 0.327. The Collaborative Asteroid Lightcurve Link assumes an intermediate albedo of 0.24 – derived from 8 Flora, the largest member and namesake of this asteroid family – and calculates a larger diameter of 8.19 kilometers using an absolute magnitude of 12.6.

== Naming ==
This minor planet was named after one of the most famous Finnish writers, Frans Eemil Sillanpää (1888–1964), first Finnish writer to receive the Nobel Prize in Literature in 1939 (also see List of Laureates since 1901). The official naming citation was published by the Minor Planet Center on 20 February 1976 (M.P.C. 3928).
