= Jussi Jurkka =

Finnish actor (1930–1982)

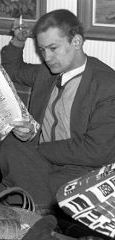
Jurkka in 1956

Jussi Tapani Jurkka (15 June 1930 – 9 April 1982) was a Finnish actor. He was born into a family of actors. His parents, Eino Jurkka and Emmi Jurkka, were theatre leaders and actors; his brother Sakari Jurkka and sister Vappu Jurkka worked as actors, and so did his cousins Rauli Tuomi and Liisa Tuomi.

During his career, Jurkka appeared in 32 films, such as Morsiusseppele (1954), The Unknown Soldier (1955) and Punainen viiva (1959). In television, he appeared in a sketch comedy show Parempi myöhään... (1979–1980) with Pentti Siimes and Ritva Valkama.

== Personal life and death ==
Jussi Jurkka was married to Maikki Länsiö. Their daughter Laura Jurkka is also an actress. Having been a heavy smoker all his life, Jurkka died of throat cancer at the age of 51.

== Selected filmography ==
- Kanavan laidalla (1949)
- Alaston malli karkuteillä (1953)
- Shamrock (1953)
- Morsiusseppele (1954)
- Tuntematon sotilas (1955)
- Silja – nuorena nukkunut (1956)
- Komisario Palmun erehdys (1960)
- Akseli ja Elina (1970)
- Päämaja (1970)
- Luottamus (1976)
