= Emmi Jurkka =

Finnish actress, director and theatre manager

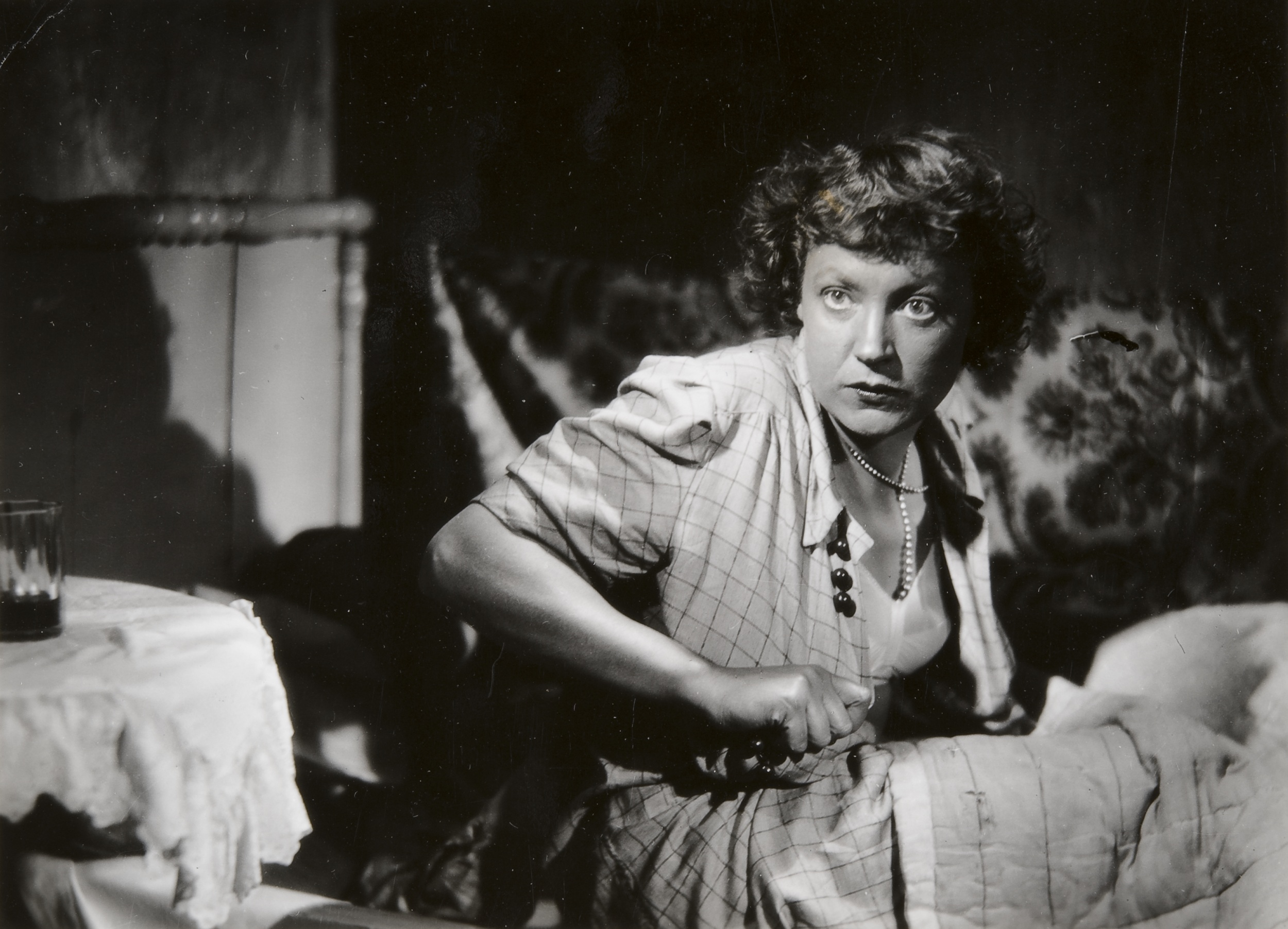
- Jurkka in her role as Tussan Lyyti, in Nyrki Tapiovaara's One Man's Fate (1940)
- Born: Emmi Irene Bergström; 21 April 1899; Helsinki, Grand Duchy of Finland
- Died: 17 October 1990 (aged 91); Helsinki, Finland
- Spouse: Eino Jurkka (m. 1922; div. 1931)
- Awards: Pro Finlandia (1954); Jussi Award (1954); Ida Aalberg Prize (1977)

Emmi Jurkka (née originally Bergström, later Tuomi; 21 April 1899 — 17 October 1990) was a Finnish actor and theatre manager, with a career in stage, film and TV spanning over 60 years.

== Career ==
Emmi Jurkka has been described as "legendary" in the world of Finnish theatre. As an actor, she was physical, sensual, expressive and immersive. She performed a wide range of roles, from tragic to comic, and serious to lighthearted.

=== Stage ===
During her career, Jurkka was attached to several Finnish theatres, including Turku City Theatre, Tampere Theatre Helsinki City Theatre and the Finnish National Theatre.

In 1953, Emmi Jurkka, together with her daughter Vappu, founded a small studio theatre, Teatteri Jurkka, which continues to operate to this day.

=== Film ===
Jurkka appeared in over 40 films, mainly in the 1940s and 50s. Among her more notable roles was as Hilda Husso in the 1954 Kun on tunteet, for which she received the Best Supporting Actress Jussi Award.

She is also credited with directing five short films.

== Honours and awards ==
In 1954, Jurkka received the Pro Finlandia medal of the Order of the Lion of Finland, and in 1977, Finland's premier theatre award, the Ida Aalberg Prize.

== Personal life ==
Emmi Jurkka was married to fellow thespian Eino Jurkka, and the couple had three children, Sakari, Jussi and Vappu Jurkka, each of whom also went into acting.
