= Jurka =

The surname Jurka may refer to:

- Blanche Jurka (1887-1974), American stage and film actress and director
- Jakub Jurka (born 1999), Czech fencer
- Jaroslav Jurka (born 1949), Czech fencer
- Jerzy Jurka (1950–2014), Polish-American biologist
- Miroslav Jurka (born 1987), Czech handball player
- Timothy Jurka (born 1988), Polish-American computer scientist
