= Timo Jurkka =

Finnish actor

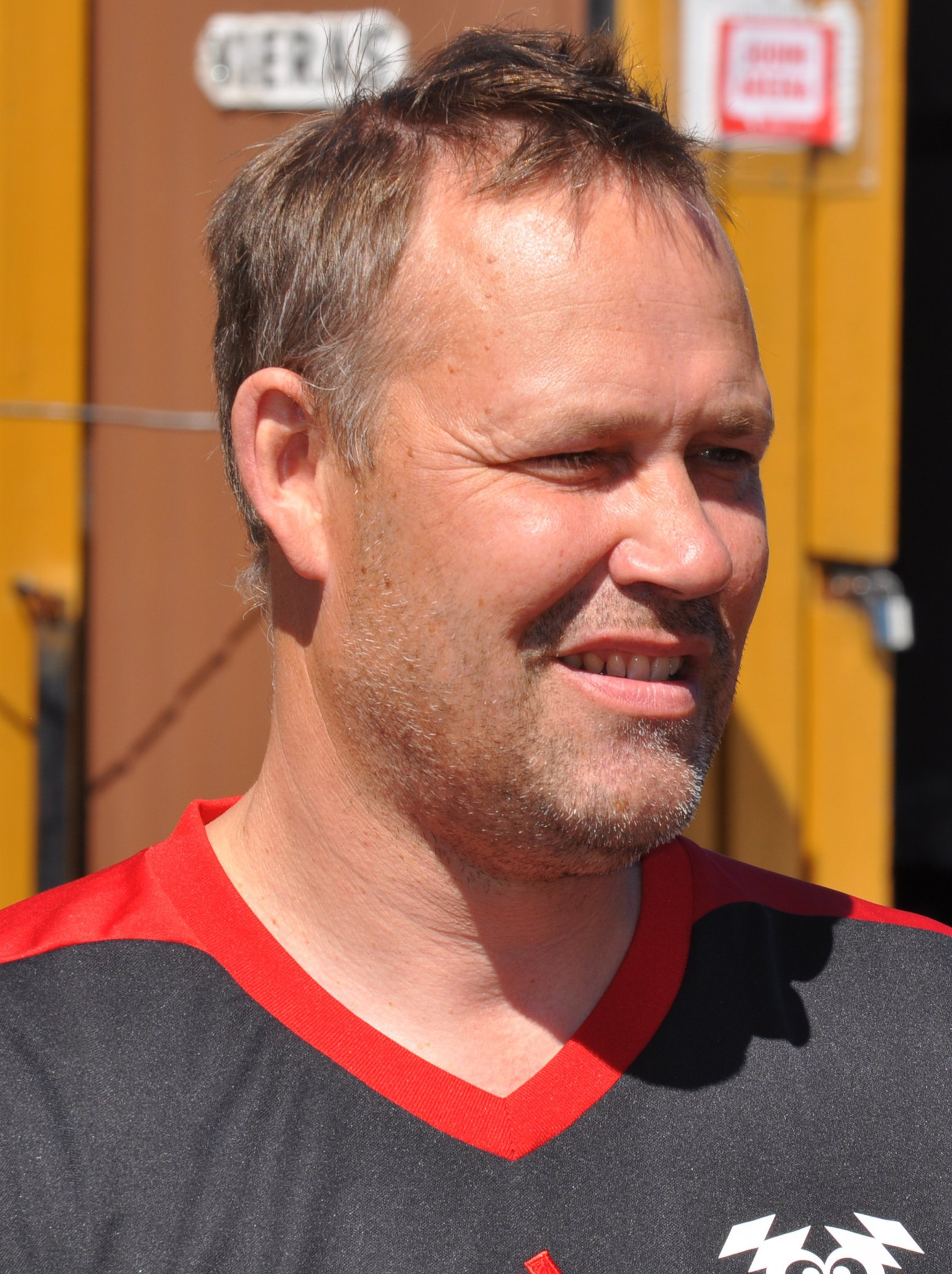
- Timo Jurkka in 2012.
- Born: 6 October 1963 (age 61); Helsinki, Finland

Timo Jurkka (born 6 October 1963, in Helsinki) is a Finnish actor, the son of actor Sakari Jurkka.

Jurkka is also a musician. He writes songs and composes as well as performs songs accompanied with guitar. Jurkka has performed in the theatre of Espoo, in the summer theatre of Pyynikki and in Theatre Jurkka.

== Filmography ==
- Salatut elämät 1999 TV-series (Lasse Sievinen 2004–2012, 2013–2015)
- Rotanloukku 2003 TV
- Sokkotanssi 1999 (Police)
- Force majeure 1999 (Ilkka Rajala)
- Säädyllinen murhenäytelmä 1998 (Artur, Naimi's husband)
- "Kvartetti" 1991 (mini) TV-series (Member of quartet)
- Pyörteissä 1990 (TV) (Lover)
- Paratiisin kahleissa 1989 (TV) (Pasi)
- Uuno Turhapuro armeijan leivissä 1984
