= Juha (1999 film) =

- DVD cover
- Directed by: Aki Kaurismäki
- Written by: Aki Kaurismäki
- Based on: Juha by Juhani Aho
- Produced by: Aki Kaurismäki
- Starring: Sakari Kuosmanen; Kati Outinen; André Wilms; Markku Peltola; Elina Salo
- Cinematography: Timo Salminen
- Edited by: Aki Kaurismäki
- Music by: Anssi Tikanmäki
- Distributed by: Senso Films
- Release dates: 13 February 1999 (Berlin Film Festival); 25 February 1999 (Finland)
- Running time: 78 minutes
- Country: Finland
- Languages: Silent film; Finnish intertitles; + several foreign intertitles
- Budget: FIM 4,773,394 (approx. € 807,000)

Juha is a 1999 Finnish film written, directed, produced and edited by Aki Kaurismäki. The film is loosely based on a famous 1911 novel Juha by the Finnish author Juhani Aho marking this as the fourth time the novel was adapted for the screen. The original story takes place in the 18th century but Kaurismäki's remake is set sometime in the latter half of the 20th century. It tells the story of a love triangle where a simple peasant woman leaves her husband after falling in love with a modern city slicker. Juha is a silent film shot in black-and-white with dialogue in the form of intertitles. Special release prints with titles in several different languages were produced for international distribution.

== Plot ==
Marja (Kati Outinen) is a simple peasant woman married to her older husband Juha (Sakari Kuosmanen). They lead a very simple country life, spending most of their days farming and tending to their livestock. Marja's world is turned upside down when Shemeikka (André Wilms) comes to the happily married couple asking them for help with his broken down sports convertible and a place to spend the night. As Juha works to repair the car, Shemeikka attempts to lure Marja to leave Juha and come to the city with him. A hesitant Marja does not want to leave her husband at first but ultimately gives in to temptation after dreaming of a wonderful new life in a big city. Shemeikka and Marja leave for the city but Marja's dream quickly becomes a nightmare when Shemeikka enslaves her in a brothel.

== Cast and characters ==
- Sakari Kuosmanen - Juha
- Kati Outinen - Marja
- André Wilms - Shemeikka
- Markku Peltola - Driver
- Elina Salo - Shemeikka's Sister
- Ona Kamu - Shemeikka's Woman
- Outi Mäenpää - Shemeikka's Woman
- Tuire Tuomisto - Shemeikka's Woman
- Esko Nikkari - Rural Police Chief

== Reception ==
On Rotten Tomatoes, Juha has a rating of 40%, based on five reviews, with an average rating of 6.3/10.

The film grossed $14,385 in its opening week.

== See also ==
- 1999 in film
- Cinema of Finland
- List of Finnish films: 1990s
- Juha (1937 film), a 1937 adaptation of the same novel
- Juha (1956 film), a 1956 adaptation of the same novel. The first Finnish feature-length color film and the first Finnish widescreen film.
