= Sakari Jurkka =

Finnish actor (1923–2012)

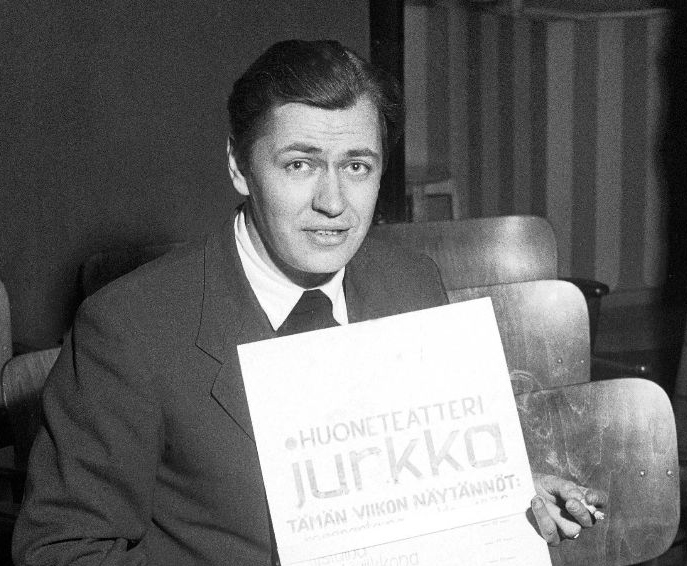
Sakari Jurkka in 1955

Heikki Sakari Jurkka (originally Juurivirta; 16 September 1923 − 13 December 2012) was a Finnish theatre and film actor. He received a Jussi Award for best male performance in a 1954 film Minäkö isä!. He also directed three movies during his career. Sakari Jurkka's parents Eino and Emmi Jurkka, as well as his sister Vappu and brother Jussi Jurkka, were all actors. His son Timo Jurkka is also an actor.

== Selected filmography ==
- Runon kuningas ja muuttolintu (1940)
- Gabriel, Come Back (1951)
- Noita palaa elämään (1952)
- Leena (1954) also director
- Helunan häämatka (1955) also director
- Silja – nuorena nukkunut (1956)
- Voi veljet, mikä päivä! (1961) also director
- Täällä alkaa seikkailu (1965)
- Oppenheimerin tapaus (1967)
- Akseli and Elina (1970)
- Raid (2003)
