= Juha (Merikanto) =

Opera by Aarre Merikanto

- by Aarre Merikanto
- First page of the score.
- Librettist: Aino Ackté
- Language: Finnish
- Based on: Juha by Juhani Aho
- Premiere: 28 October 1963; Lahti, Finland

Juha is a three-act opera by Aarre Merikanto, with a Finnish libretto by Aino Ackté based on the 1911 novel of the same name by Juhani Aho. Although completed by 1922, it was only finally staged at the music college in Lahti on 28 October 1963. The story is a drama of a love triangle: the older husband Juha, his young wife Marja, and her seducer the merchant Shemeikka. Set in the 1880s in Kainuu in northern Finland, the human tragedy is based around the harsh realities of a farming community and the clash of their lifestyle with the more worldly nomadic Karelians, represented by Shemeikka.

== Background ==
Ackté first offered the libretto to Sibelius, who, after two years, declined to set it, explaining in a letter to Ackté that he believed the text should be subservient to the “absolute music” of the score, and he felt unable to achieve that with what he called Aho’s “masterpiece”.

Juha was Merikanto's second opera, following Helena in 1912. Having composed Juha from 1919 to 1922, Merikanto submitted it to the board of the national opera in Helsinki who were worried by its modernity. As he had no response from them, Merikanto withdrew the work and did not compose any further operas. A “safer“ version was written by Leevi Madetoja and premiered at the Finnish National Opera in 1935. The third act of Merikanto's version was broadcast on 4 December 1957, the year before the composer’s death, and the entire opera on 3 December 1958.

After the Lahti première on 28 October 1963, Juha was accepted at the Finnish National Opera in 1967, leading to a recording for Finlandia, and a production at Savonlinna in 1971, revived the following year. A later production was toured to the Edinburgh Festival in 1987. The opera has also been seen in Hagen, Evanston and Essen. A new production was mounted at Helsinki Opera House in December 2011.

The music is most powerful when embodying the raw emotions of the characters: Juha's passive suffering, and his forgiveness for his wife contrasted with his wild rage when he attacks and cripples Shemeikka; Marja's love for Shemeikka and pain when he turns from her; Anja’s moving lyricism, whose love for Shemeikka is unrequited. Janáček's terseness and Szymanowski’s richness are points of reference, although the composer has a unique voice his own. One reviewer has even described the piece as “one of the great operas of the [20th] century”.

However, although there are parallels with the Janáček of Jenůfa or Káťa Kabanová, there is also a “high-Romantic, rhapsodic” use of the orchestra. Instrumental characterization of the cast is also used: Juha with brass and low woodwind, while Shemeikka’s sound world is bright and at times veristic; Marja is often accompanied by solo violin or flute. In the long third act interlude, the themes and instrumental colours of the three main protagonists are worked through sonata-form development.

== Roles ==
- Juha (baritone)
- Marja (soprano)
- Shemeikka (tenor)
- Anja (soprano)
- Two tar-makers (baritone, bass)
- Mother-in-law (contralto)
- Kaisa (soprano)
- Kalamatti (a fisherman) (bass)
- Two of Shemeikka’s summer sweethearts (soprano, alto)
- Shemeikka’s mother (mezzo-soprano)
- Men, women (chorus)

== Synopsis ==
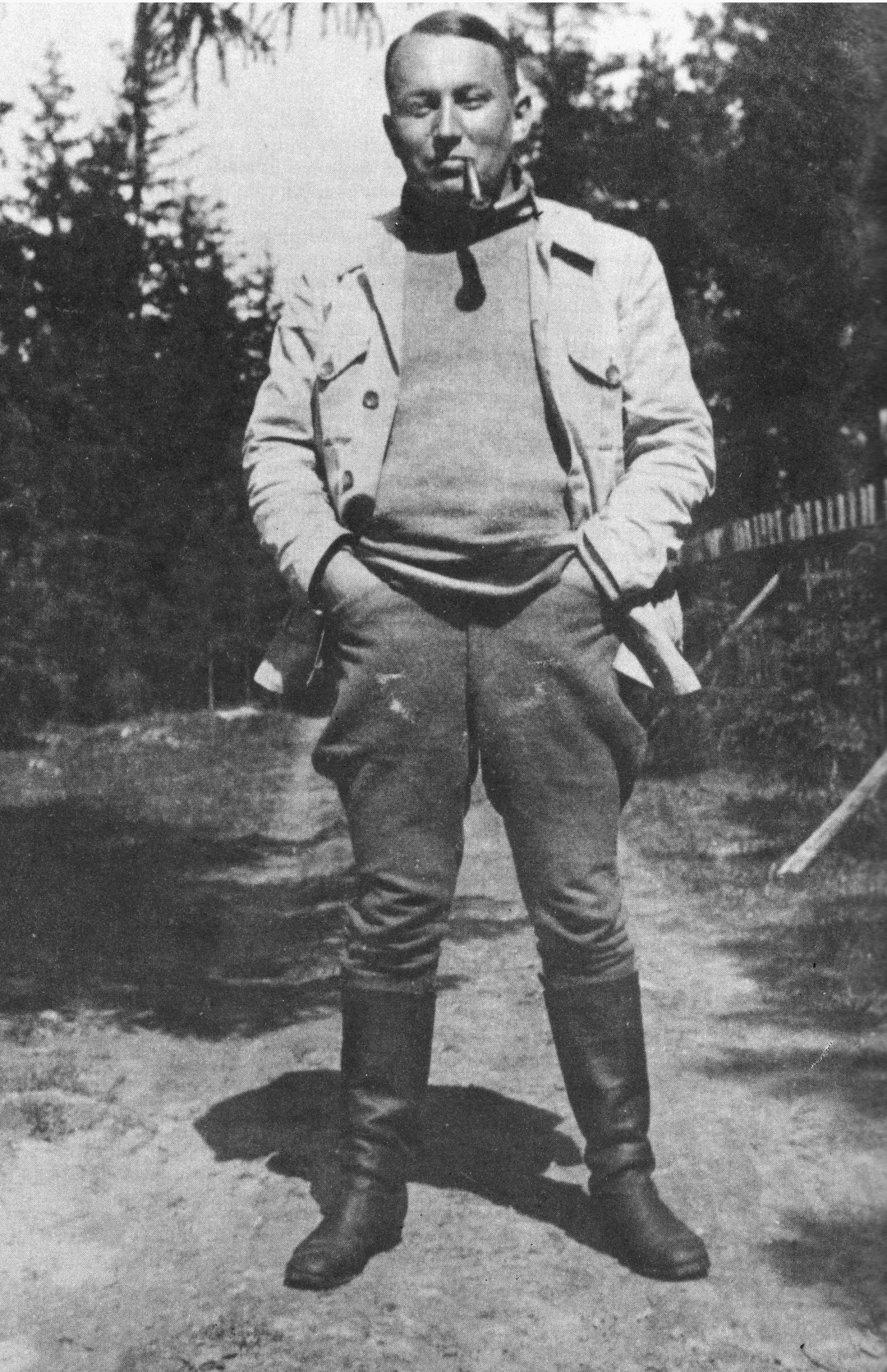
Aarre Merikanto in early 1920s when he was composing Juha.

Act 1 opens with Juha reflecting on how his marriage has soured; his wife Marja no longer takes any notice of him. Shemeikka, a wealthy merchant, arrives at the village and flirts with Marja, giving her a gold buckle and silk shawl, which Juha insists on paying for. Next day, while Juha has gone in his boat to fetch his mother for a visit, Shemeikka passes by again, mocking Marja’s older husband and urging her to come away with him. Unmoved at first, when her mother-in-law arrives and insults her she is spurred into joining the merchant. Kaisa, the maid, says that Marja has been taken by force.

The first scene of Act 2 is set in one of Shemeikka’s fishing cabins where Marja is excitedly awaiting his return after an absence of three weeks. Eventually Marja is told of Shemeikka’s methods – an old fisherman tells her of his robbery and extortion, and another girl at the house, Anja, explains how he finds a new girl each summer and when he is tired of her passes her on to his family as a servant. The other girls seem to have accepted this. When Shemeikka returns, drunk, Marja asks the old fisherman to take her away, but he is afraid. She reveals to Shemeikka that she is pregnant and he tells her to return to her husband – another child is nothing to him. Marja strikes him.

The next scene is at Shemeikka’s large farmstead, where Marja is rocking her baby’s cradle. She is bitter, but during a conversation with Anja sees Juha (who has come searching for Marja) outside in the yard. Marja at first wants to hide from him, but then decides to leave, but Shemeikka’s mother stops her – the child must stay. Shemeikka comes in with a new summer girl from Russia, and dances ensue. Marja confronts Shemeikka then rushes out.

Back at Juha’s farm, Marja enters alone in rags, only to be abused again by her mother-in-law. Juha welcomes his wife back, warmly, believing she was taken by force. She tells him of Shemeikka’s new son, and Juha insists they leave to collect the child. Marja berates herself for lying to the man who has forgiven her. A ten-minute orchestral interlude leads to the final scene back at Shemeikka’s fishing cabin. Juha and Marja find the merchant as he comes from the sauna, mocking Juha. Goaded by Shemeikka Juha attacks him, smashing his arm and leg before Anja shouts out what everyone apart from Juha has known: Marja was not abducted by Shemeikka but followed him willingly. In horror, Juha runs out and throws himself in the nearby rapids.

== Discography ==
Year	Cast: Juha, Marja, Shemeikka	Conductor, Opera House and Orchestra	Label
1972	Matti Lehtinen, Raili Kostia, Hendrik Krumm	Ulf Söderblom; Finnish National Opera Orchestra and Chorus	Audio CD: Finlandia; Cat: FACD105
1995	Jorma Hynninen, Eeva-Liisa Saarinen, Raimo Sirkiä	Jukka-Pekka Saraste; Finnish Radio Symphony Orchestra and Tapiola Chamber Choir, Finnish Chamber Singers	Audio CD: Ondine; Cat: ODE872
