= Juhani Aho =

Finnish author and journalist (1861–1921)

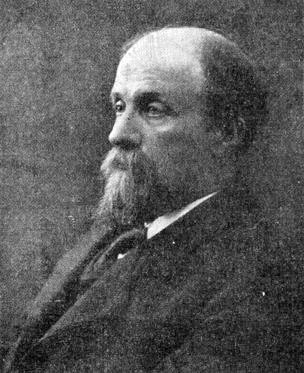
- Born: Johannes Brofeldt; 11 September 1861 Lapinlahti
- Died: 8 August 1921 (aged 59) Helsinki
- Notable works: Rautatie (1884); Papin tytär (1885); Yksin (1890); Juha (1911); Lastuja I–VIII (1891–1921)

Juhani Aho, originally Johannes Brofeldt (11 September 1861 – 8 August 1921), was a Finnish author and journalist. He was nominated for the Nobel Prize in Literature sixteen times.

== Early life ==
Juhani Aho was born at Lapinlahti in 1861. His parents were Henrik Gustaf Theodor Brofeldt and Karolina Fredrika Emelie "Emma" Brofeldt (née Snellman). The Brofeldts were a priestly family: Theodor was a relatively well-known revivalist preacher whose sermons were published in 1917 as Rovasti H. G. Th. Brofeldtin saarnoja ("Reverend H. G. Th. Brofeldt's Sermons") and his father had been a chaplain and his grandfather a vicar. Juhani had two younger brothers Kaarlo Kustaa Brofeldt (1865–1936) and Petter Fredrik Brofeldt (1864–1945) who, following Juhani's example, adopted the Finnish names Kalle and Pekka as well as the surname Aho.

From 1872 to 1880 Juhani Aho attended the Kuopion Lyseo, one of the few upper secondary schools offering education in Finnish. During his time at the school he adopted the pen name Juhani Aho for many of his school works. In the 1880s he studied at the University of Helsinki and was associated with political radicals. His literary pursuits were aided by Elisabeth Järnefelt and her circle, the "Järnefelt school", who were pioneers of Finnish realism.

== Career ==
Aho's literary output is wide-ranging since he pursued different styles as time passed.

He started as a realist and his first novel Rautatie (Railroad, 1884), which is considered one of his main works, is from this period. Later he moved towards neoromanticism with novels Panu and Kevät ja takatalvi as well as Juha. The last one is one of his most famous works and has been twice as adapted an opera, by Aarre Merikanto and by Leevi Madetoja, and to film four times, most recently in 1999 by Aki Kaurismäki.

His novel Yksin (Alone), published in 1890, controversially bold by the standards of Finnish literature in that epoch, is a roman à clef. Its tale of unrequited love is the autobiographical novel of Aho's passion for Aino Järnefelt who, at that time, was engaged to Jean Sibelius, whom she would later marry. The initial feelings of anger and jealousy that reading the novel provoked in Sibelius were soon forgotten and, in later life, Aho and Sibelius were close friends as well as neighbours in Järvenpää, where the composer had a villa christened "Ainola" (the Place of Aino). Aho married Venny Soldan-Brofeldt in 1891.

In addition to his novels, Aho wrote a number of short stories of distinct style, called "splinters" ("lastuja" in Finnish). Their topics could vary from political allegories to depictions of everyday life.

The first and most famous of the short stories is Siihen aikaan kun isä lampun osti (When Father Brought Home the Lamp), depicting the effect of the innovation on people living in the countryside. Nowadays the title is a Finnish saying used when something related to new technology is introduced.

Aho was one of the founders of Päivälehti, the predecessor of the biggest newspaper in Finland today, Helsingin Sanomat. He was also one of the active contributors of a cultural magazine, Valvoja.

Aho loved fly fishing. In 1906 he got to know Huopanankoski rapids in Viitasaari. After that he went there every spring and autumn for 14 years. He also went summers in Laukkoski, Pornainen.

Aho died in Helsinki in 1921. The photographer Claire Aho is his granddaughter.

== Gallery ==
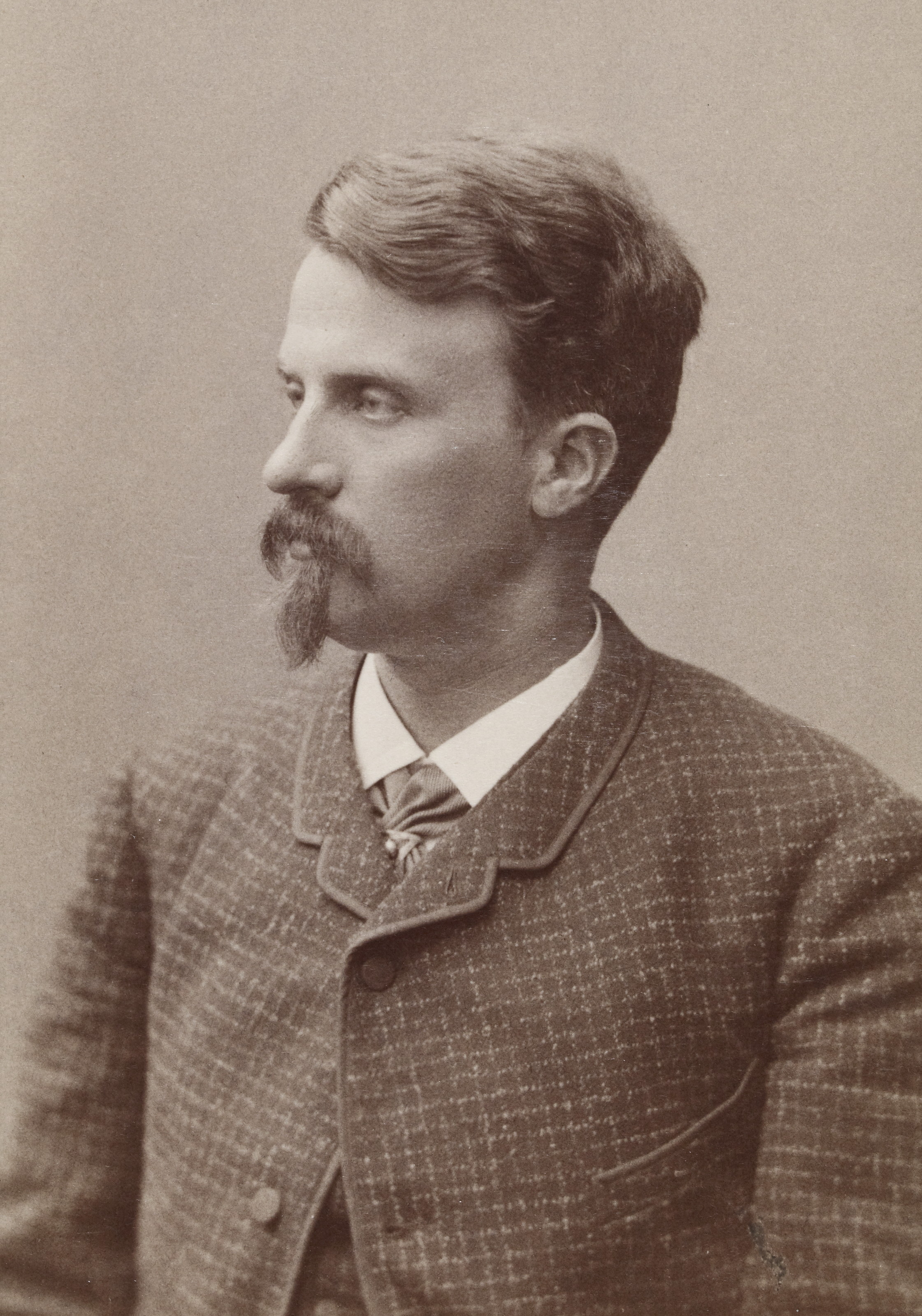
Aho in 1886

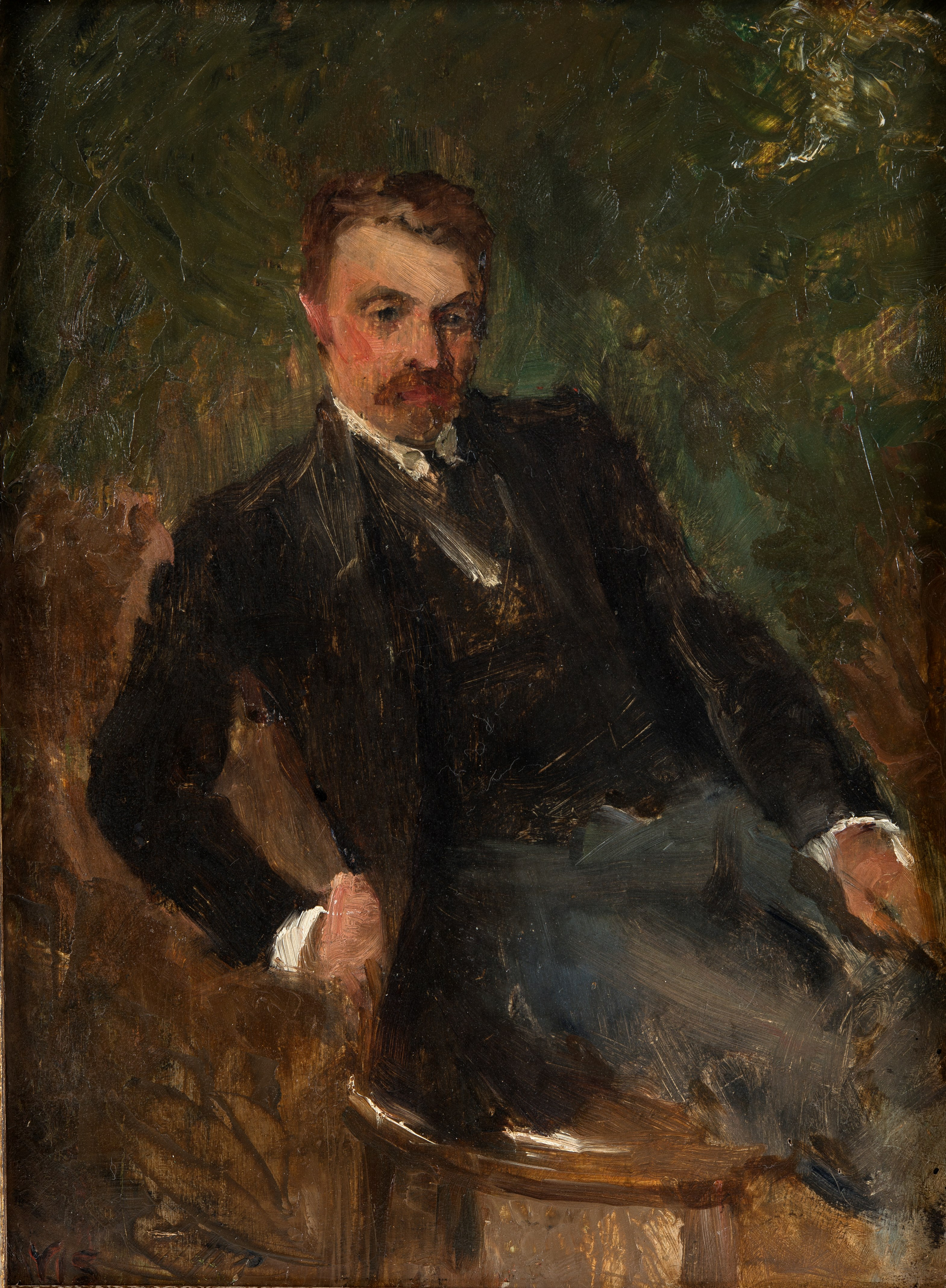
Portrait by his wife Venny Soldan-Brofeldt, 1890

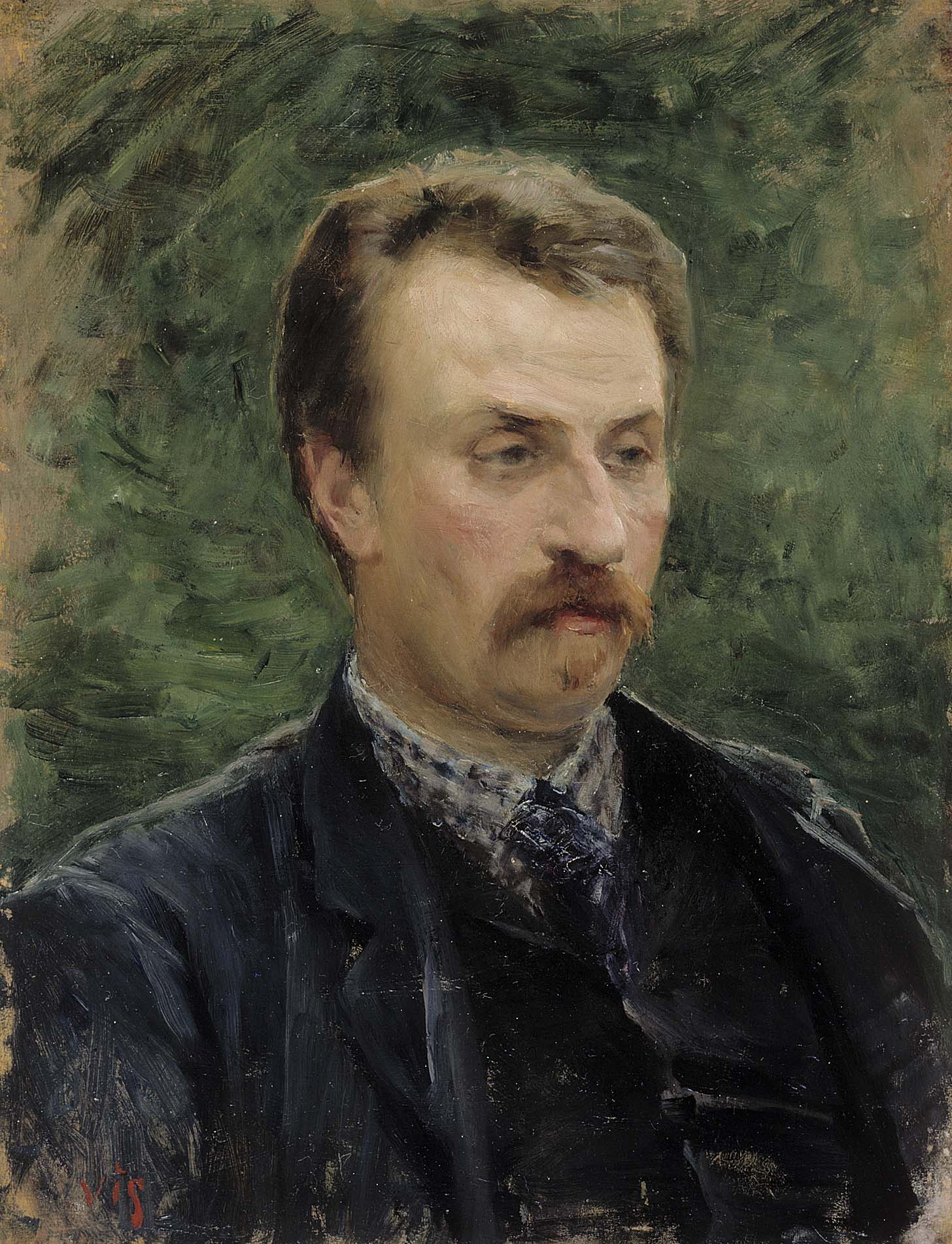
Portrait by Venny, 1891

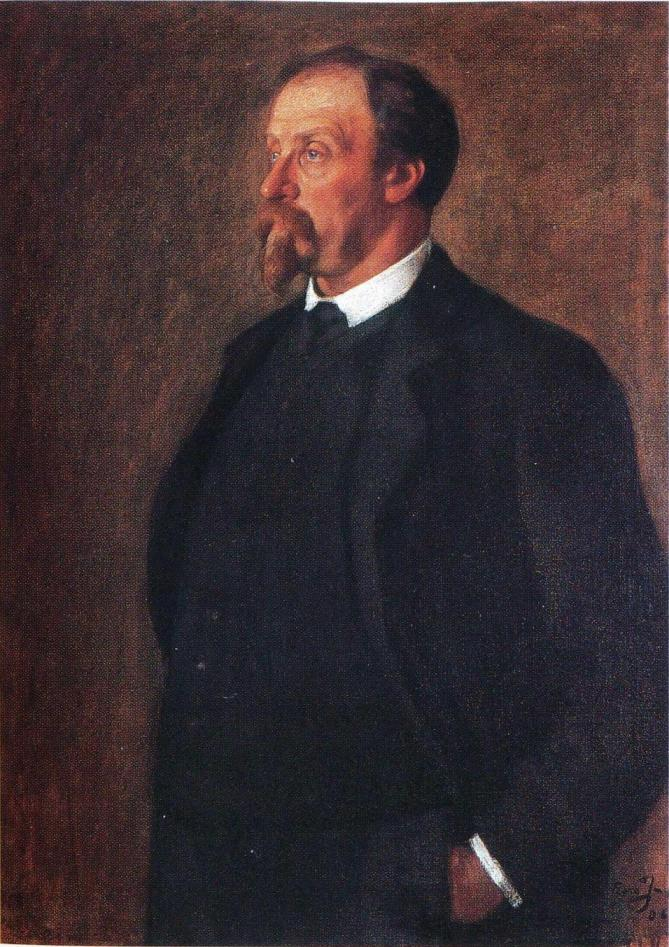
Aho by Eero Järnefelt, 1906

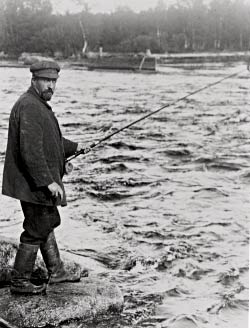
Fishing at Huopanankoski in Viitasaari, Central Finland

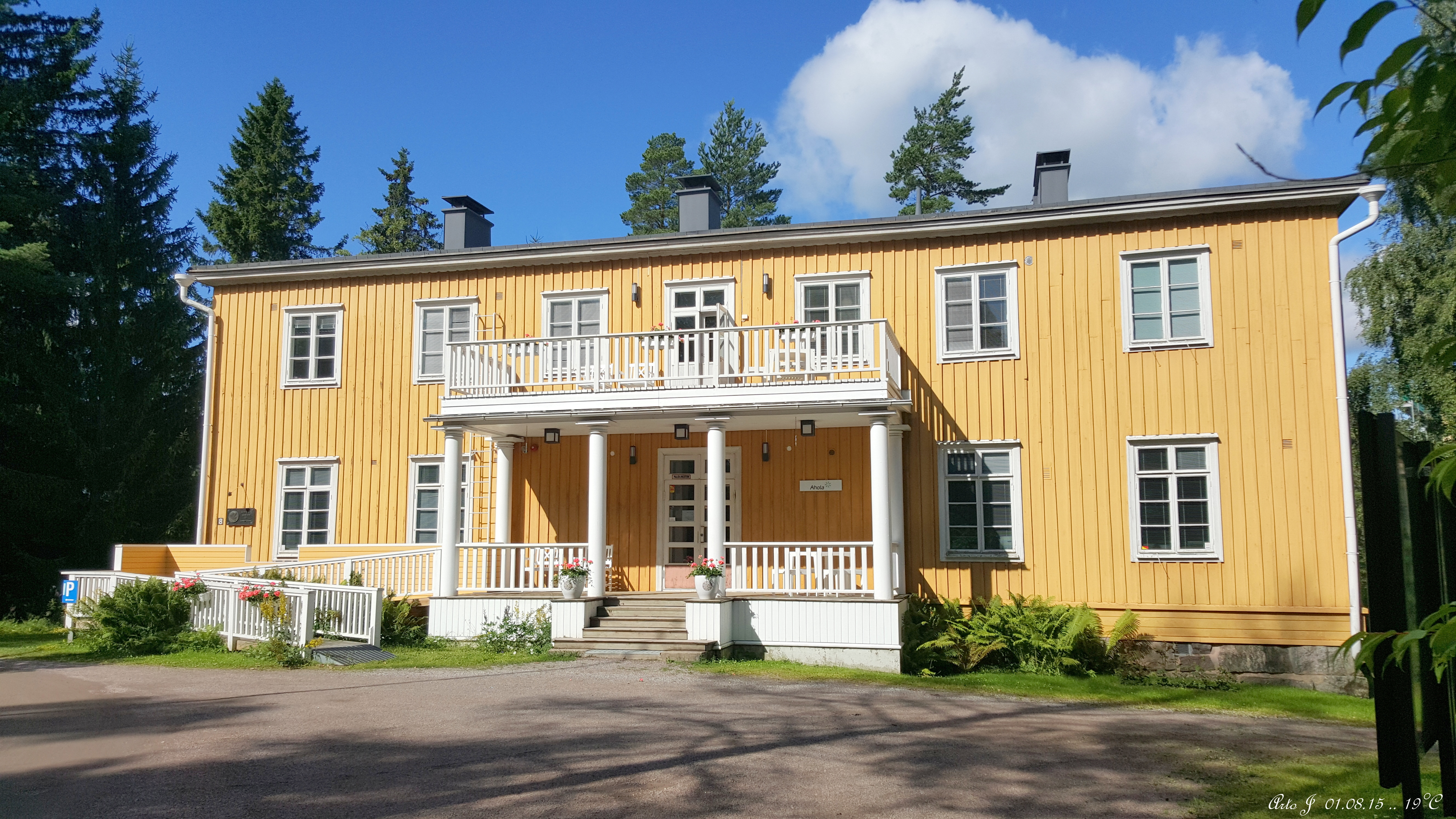
Ahola, Aho's home in Järvenpää

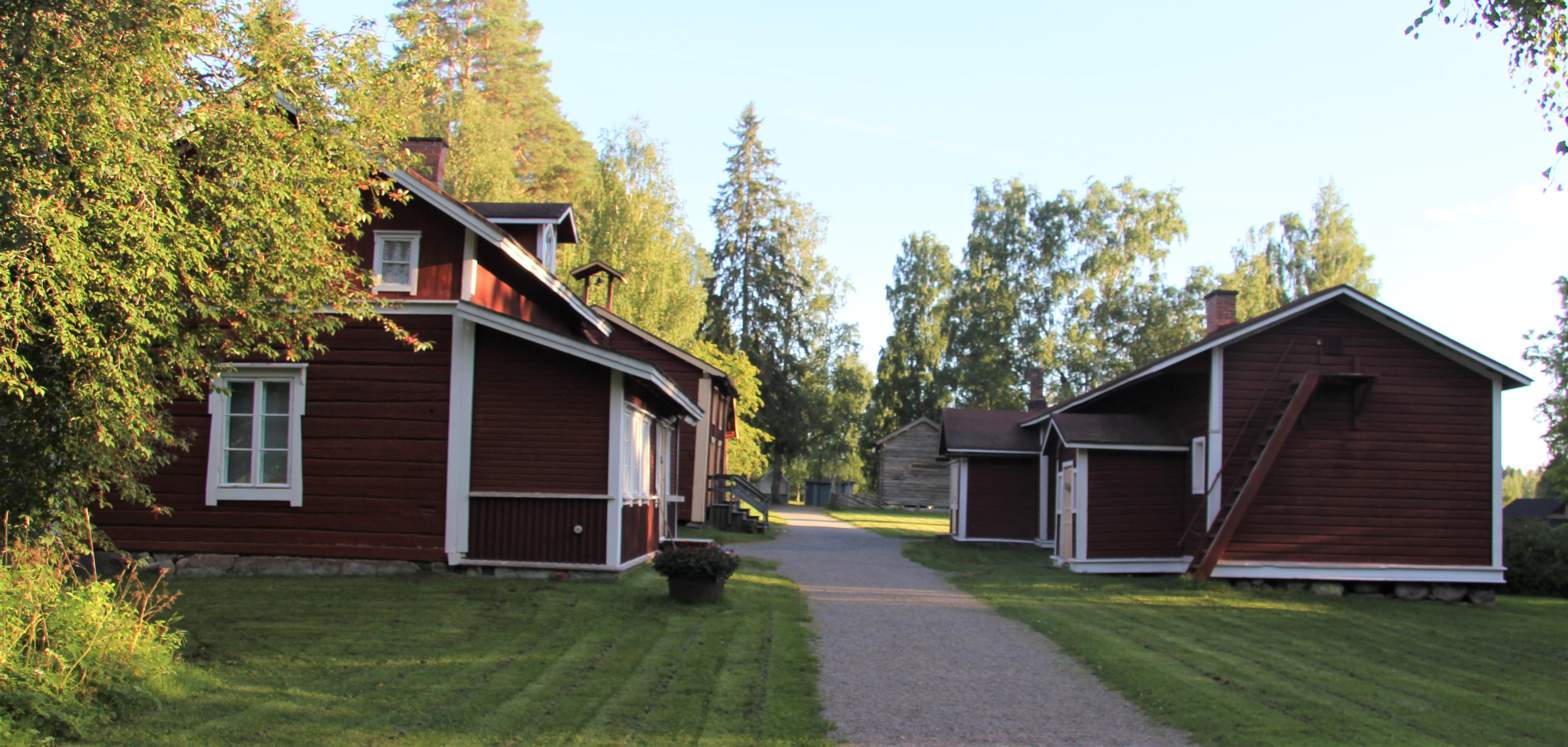
Juhani Aho Museum in Iisalmi

== See also ==
- Aleksis Kivi
- Johannes Linnankoski
- Frans Eemil Sillanpää
