= Nyrki Tapiovaara =

Finnish film director

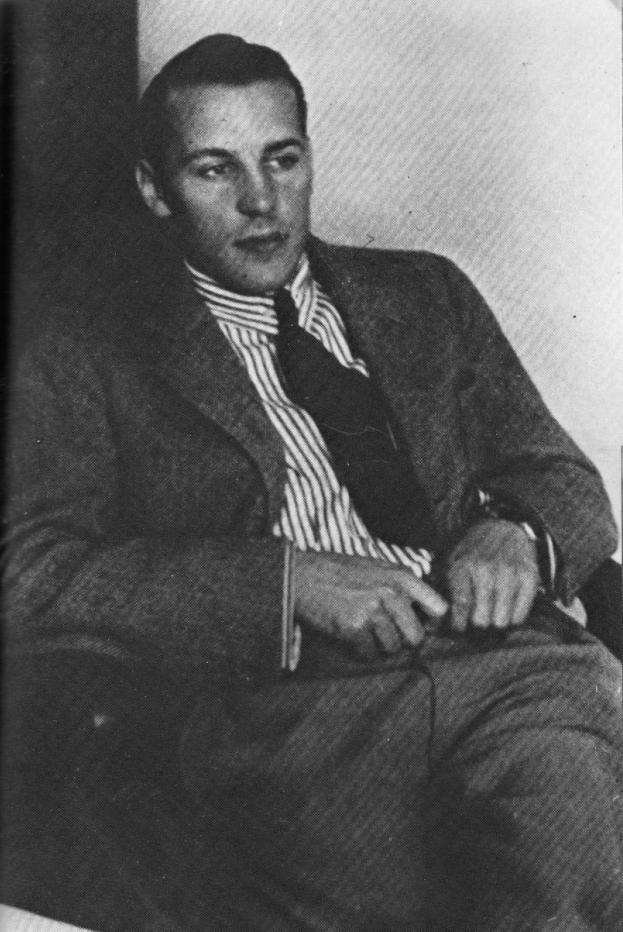
Tapiovaara in 1938

Nyrki Tapiovaara, born 10 September 1911 in Pitäjänmäki, Helsinki, died 29 February 1940, was a Finnish film director. He belonged to the Tulenkantajat group which promoted modernist ideas in Finnish culture. Tapiovaara's film career only lasted four years and resulted in five feature films, but had a lasting effect on Finnish cinema. He died in the Winter War.

== Filmography ==
- Juha (1937)
- The Stolen Death (Varastettu kuolema) (1938)
- Kaksi Vihtoria (Two Henpecked Husbands) (1939)
- Mr. Lahtinen Takes French Leave (Herra Lahtinen lähtee lipettiin) (1939)
- One Man's Fate (Miehen tie) (1940)
