= 1952 =

Calendar year

1952 in various calendars
- Gregorian calendar: 1952; MCMLII
- Ab urbe condita: 2705
- Armenian calendar: 1401; ԹՎ ՌՆԱ
- Assyrian calendar: 6702
- Baháʼí calendar: 108–109
- Balinese saka calendar: 1873–1874
- Bengali calendar: 1358–1359
- Berber calendar: 2902
- British Regnal year: 16 Geo. 6 – 1 Eliz. 2
- Buddhist calendar: 2496
- Burmese calendar: 1314
- Byzantine calendar: 7460–7461
- Chinese calendar: 辛卯年 (Metal Rabbit); 4649 or 4442 — to — 壬辰年 (Water Dragon); 4650 or 4443
- Coptic calendar: 1668–1669
- Discordian calendar: 3118
- Ethiopian calendar: 1944–1945
- Hebrew calendar: 5712–5713
- Hindu calendars
- Vikram Samvat: 2008–2009
- Shaka Samvat: 1873–1874
- Kali Yuga: 5052–5053
- Holocene calendar: 11952
- Igbo calendar: 952–953
- Iranian calendar: 1330–1331
- Islamic calendar: 1371–1372
- Japanese calendar: Shōwa 27 (昭和２７年)
- Javanese calendar: 1883–1884
- Juche calendar: 41
- Julian calendar: Gregorian minus 13 days
- Korean calendar: 4285
- Minguo calendar: ROC 41 民國41年
- Nanakshahi calendar: 484
- Thai solar calendar: 2495
- Tibetan calendar: ལྕགས་མོ་ཡོས་ལོ་ (female Iron-Hare); 2078 or 1697 or 925 — to — ཆུ་ཕོ་འབྲུག་ལོ་ (male Water-Dragon); 2079 or 1698 or 926

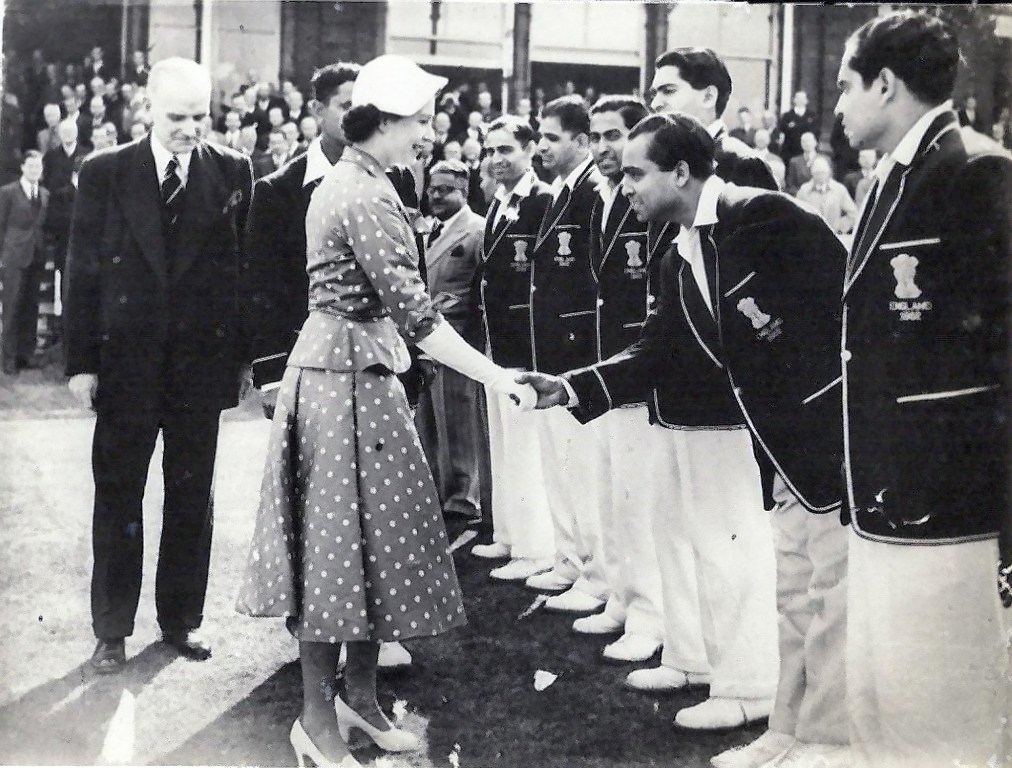
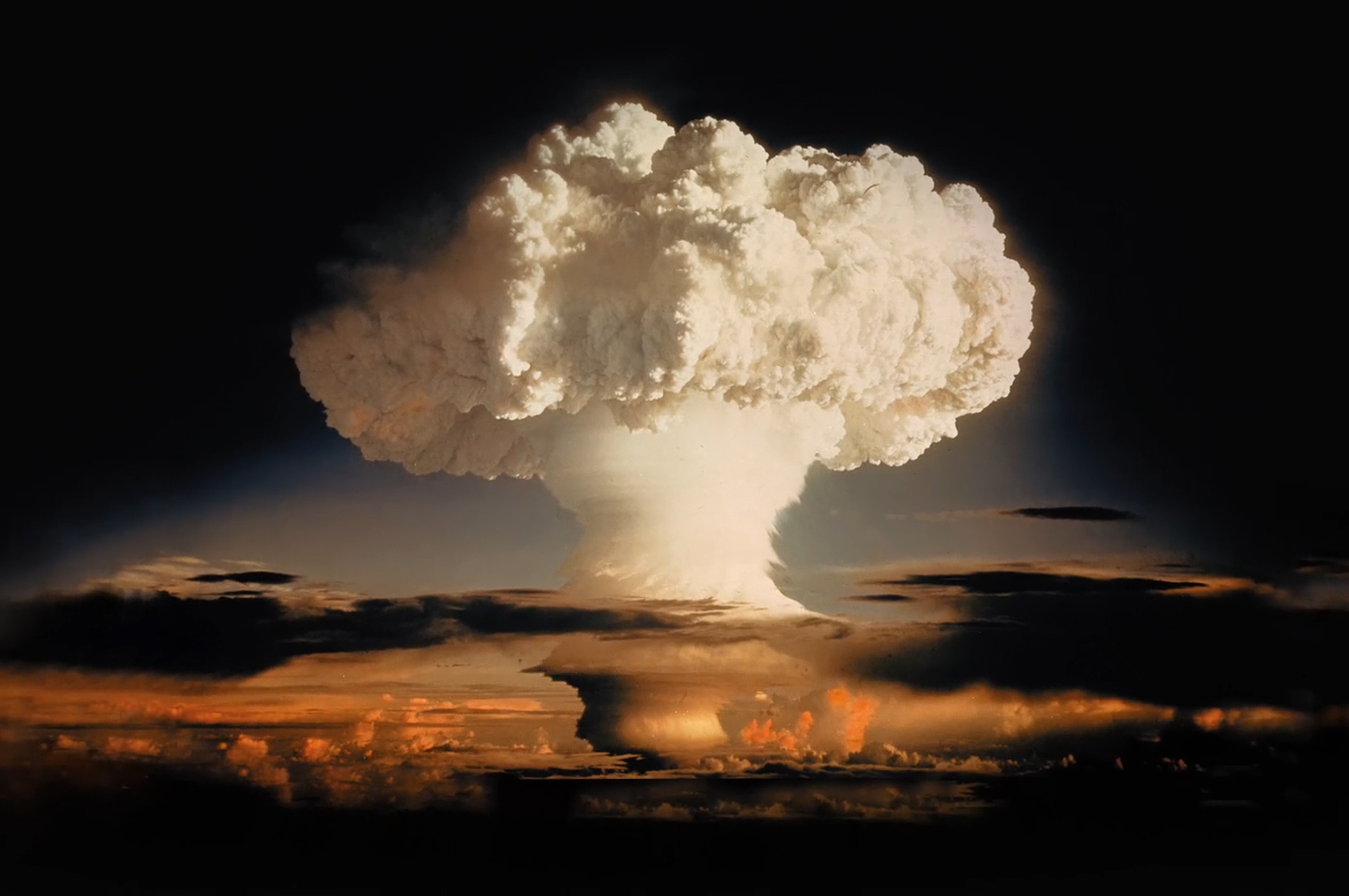
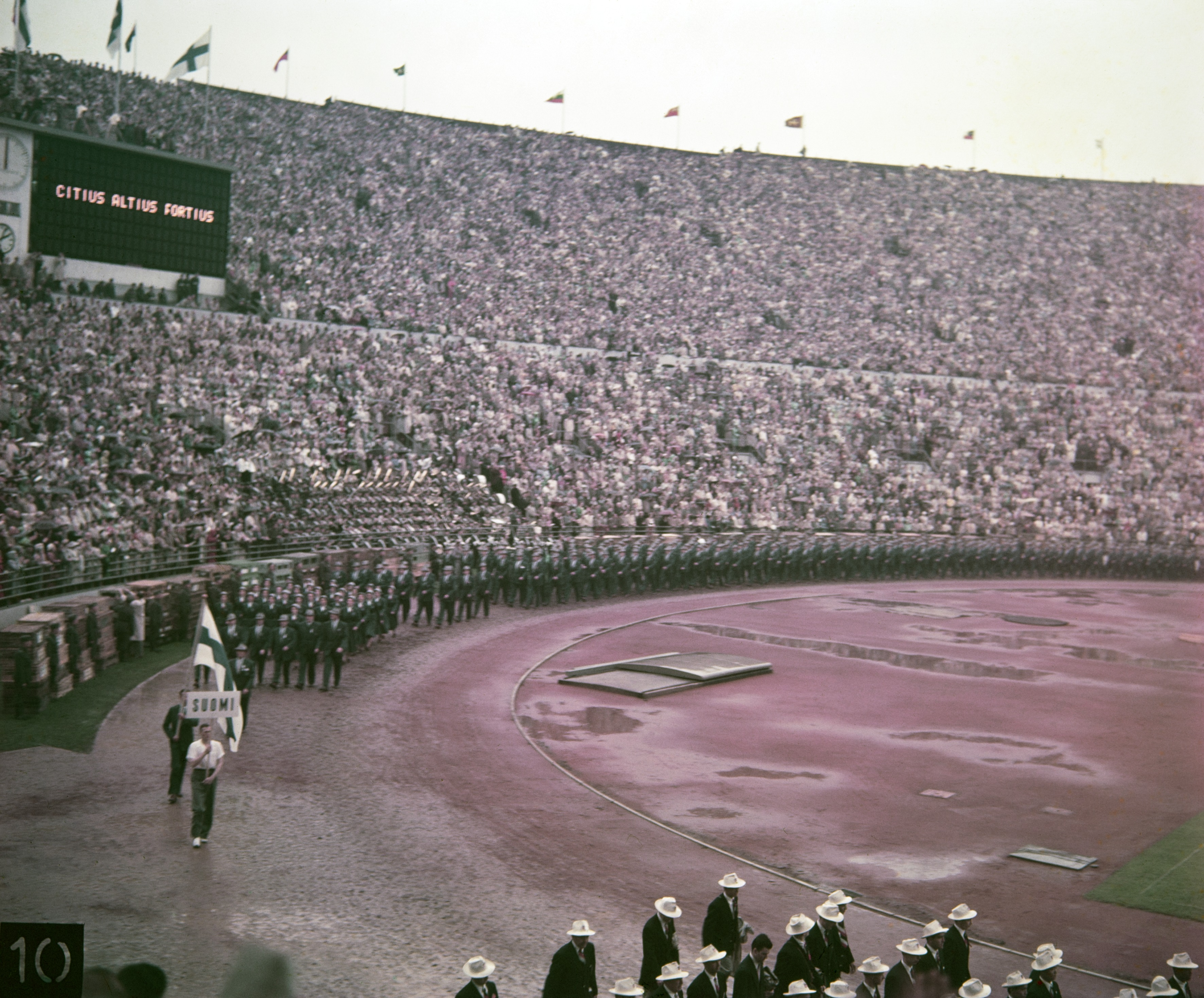
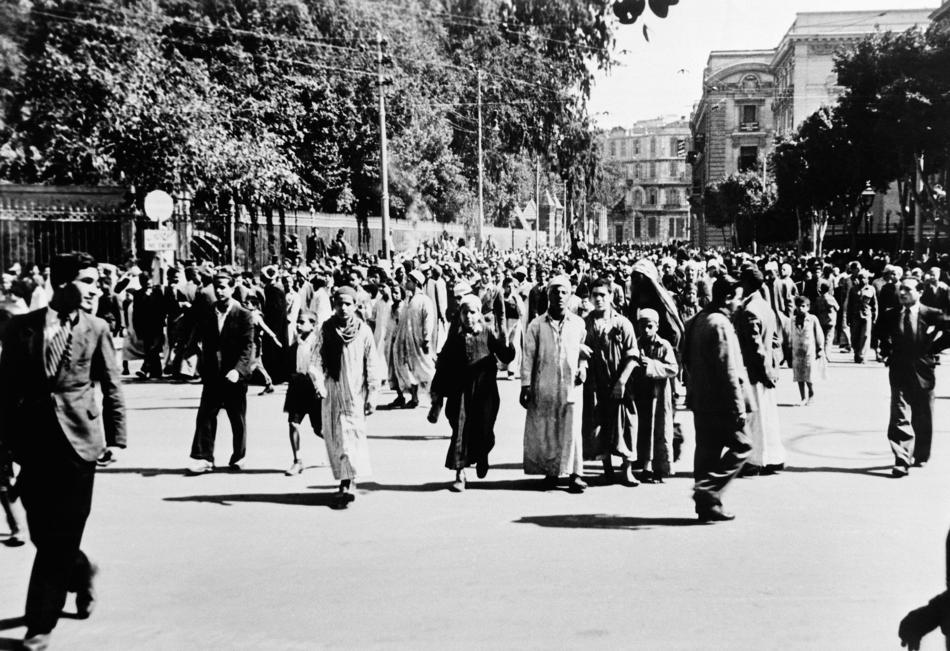
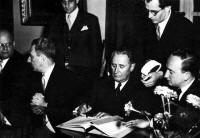
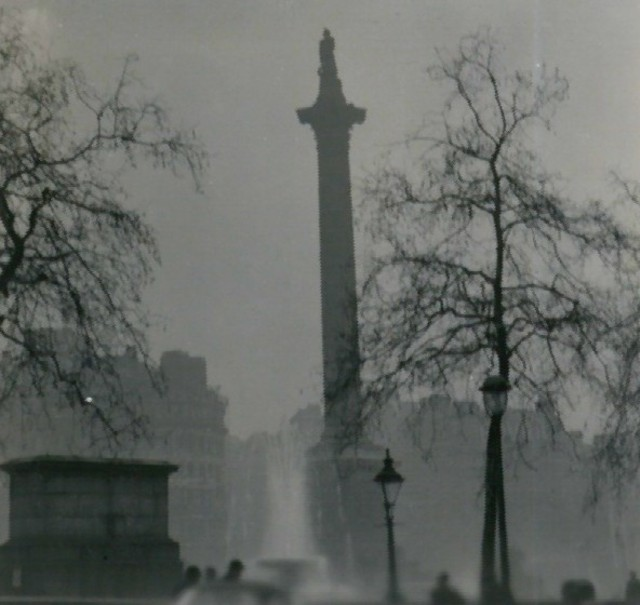
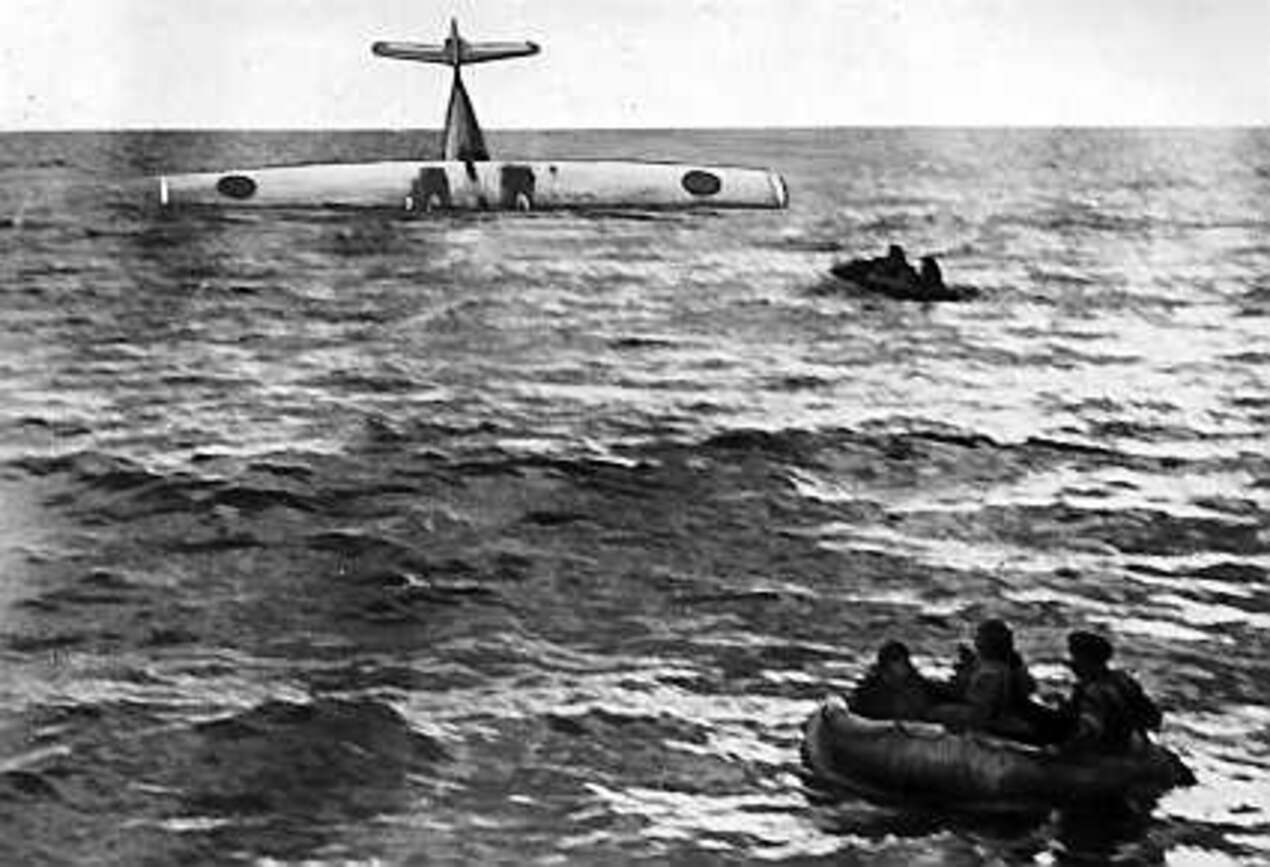
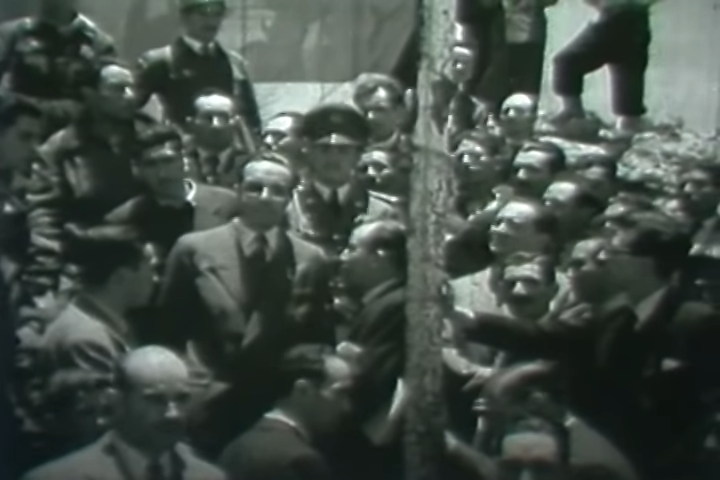
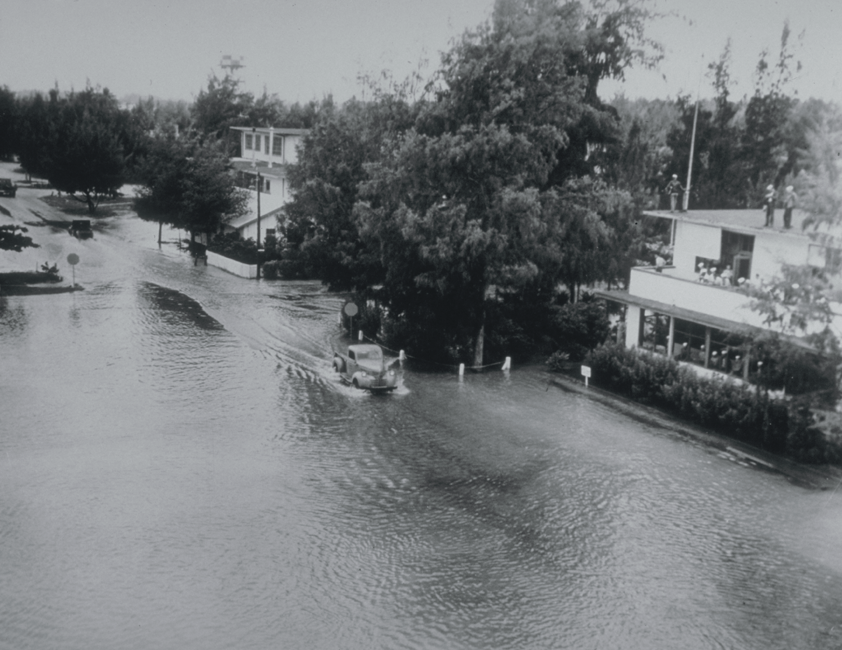
From top to bottom, left to right:
- The death of George VI occurs and Elizabeth II becomes queen of the United Kingdom;
- The Ivy Mike nuclear test succeeds at Enewetak Atoll;
- The 1952 Summer Olympics are held in Helsinki, Finland;
- The 1952 Egyptian Revolution establishes a republic;
- The Reparations Agreement between Israel and the Federal Republic of Germany is signed;
- The Great Smog of London causes widespread illness;
- The Catalina affair heightens Cold War tensions;
- The Bolivian National Revolution brings major reforms;
- The 1952 Severo-Kurilsk earthquake kills thousands in Sakhalin.

1952 (MCMLII) was a leap year starting on Tuesday of the Gregorian calendar, the 1952nd year of the Common Era (CE) and Anno Domini (AD) designations, the 952nd year of the 2nd millennium, the 52nd year of the 20th century, and the 3rd year of the 1950s decade.

== Events ==
=== January–February ===
- January 10 - A Douglas C-47 Dakota operated by Aer Lingus crashes in Wales while flying from Northolt Royal Air Force Station to Dublin. All twenty-three occupants are killed.
- January 26 – Black Saturday in Egypt: Rioters burn Cairo's central business district, targeting British and upper-class Egyptian businesses.
- February 6
  - Princess Elizabeth, Duchess of Edinburgh, becomes monarch of the United Kingdom of Great Britain and Northern Ireland and the British Dominions: Canada, Australia, New Zealand, South Africa, Pakistan and Ceylon. The princess, who is on a visit to Kenya when she hears of the death of her father, King George VI, aged 56, takes the regnal name Elizabeth II.
  - In the United States, a mechanical heart is used for the first time in a human patient.
- February 7 – New York City announces its first crosswalk devices to be installed.
- February 14–25 – The Winter Olympics are held in Oslo, Norway.
- February 15 – The State Funeral of King George VI of the United Kingdom of Great Britain and Northern Ireland and the British Dominions and the last Emperor of India, takes place. George VI's coffin is brought in procession through London to Paddington Station where a royal train brings the King to Windsor, where his funeral and burial take place at St. George's Chapel at Windsor Castle.
- February 18 – Greece and Turkey join the North Atlantic Treaty Organization.
- February 21 – In Dhaka, East Pakistan (present-day Bangladesh) police open fire on a procession of students, killing 4 people and starting a country-wide protest, which leads to the recognition of Bengali as one of the national languages of Pakistan. The day is later declared "International Mother Language Day" by UNESCO.
- February 25 – The Parícutin active volcano in Michoacán, west central Mexico, ceases its discontinuous eruption after spewing forth a gigaton of lava, and burying San Juan Parangaricutiro.
- February 26 – Vincent Massey is sworn in, becoming the first Canadian-born Governor General of Canada.

=== March–April ===
- March 10 – General Fulgencio Batista re-takes power in Cuba in a coup.
- March 15–16 – 73 inches (1,870 mm) of rain falls in Cilaos, Réunion, the most rainfall in one day up to that time.
- March 20 – The United States Senate ratifies a peace treaty with Japan.
- March 21
  - The last two executions in the Netherlands take place.
  - Kwame Nkrumah is elected Prime Minister of the Gold Coast.
  - Tornadoes ravage the lower Mississippi River Valley, leaving 208 dead, through March 22.
- March 22 – Wernher von Braun publishes the first in his series of articles titled Man Will Conquer Space Soon!, including ideas for crewed flights to Mars and the Moon.
- March 27
  - Konrad Adenauer survives an assassination attempt organized by members of a small underground group connected to Irgun, an Israeli militant Zionist organization.
  - A legislative Assembly election is held in Coorg.
- April 1 – Al Arabi sports and association football club is founded in Qatar.
- April 4
  - At a tribunal in The Hague, Israel demands reparations worth $3 billion from West Germany.
  - West Ice accidents: During a severe storm in the West Ice, east of Greenland, 78 seal hunters on 5 Norwegian seal hunting vessels vanish without a trace.
- April 7 – The I Love Lucy episode "The Marriage License", aired this evening in the United States, is the first television show in history to be seen in around 10,000,000 homes, according to the American Research Bureau.
- April 8 – Youngstown Sheet & Tube Co. v. Sawyer: The U.S. Supreme Court limits the power of the President to seize private business, after President Harry S. Truman nationalizes all steel mills in the United States, just before the 1952 steel strike begins.
- April 9
  - Hugo Ballivián's government is overthrown by the Bolivian National Revolution, which starts a period of agrarian reform, universal suffrage and the nationalization of tin mines.
  - Santa Teresa Church tragedy: 50 people are trampled to death in the Basilica of St. Teresa, Caracas, Venezuela, after someone shouts "Fire!"; 40 people are arrested in connection with the crush.
- April 11
  - Battle of Nanri Island: The Republic of China seizes the island from the People's Republic of China.
  - Bolivian National Revolution: Rebels take over Palacio Quemado.
  - Pan Am Flight 526A, Douglas DC-4 Clipper Endeavor, suffers failure of two engines and ditches in rough seas 11.3 miles (18 km) northwest of San Juan, Puerto Rico in the Atlantic Ocean, sinking in minutes; 52 of the 69 people on board die. After this accident the implementation of pre-flight safety demonstrations is recommended. The aircraft's wreckage will be discovered in 2026.
- April 18
  - Bolivia National Revolution: A universal vote enables indigenous peoples and women to vote, nationalizes mines and enacts agrarian reform.
  - West Germany and Japan form diplomatic relations.
- April 26 – United States Navy aircraft carrier Wasp collides with destroyer Hobson while on exercises in the Atlantic Ocean, killing 175 men.
- April 28 – The Treaty of San Francisco goes into effect, formally ending the war between Japan and the Allies, and simultaneously ending the occupation of the four main Japanese islands by the Supreme Commander for the Allied Powers.

=== May–June ===
- May 1 – East Germany threatens to form its own army.
- May 3 – U.S. lieutenant colonels Joseph O. Fletcher and William P. Benedict land a plane at the geographic North Pole.
- May 6 – Farouk of Egypt has himself announced as a descendant of the Islamic prophet, Muhammad.
- May 13 – Pandit Nehru forms his first government in India.
- May 15 – Diplomatic relations are established between Israel and Japan at the level of legations.
- May 18 – Ann Davison becomes the first woman to single-handedly sail the Atlantic Ocean.
- June 1
  - The Roman Catholic Church bans the books of André Gide.
  - Navigation opens on the Volga–Don Canal, connecting the Caspian Sea basin with that of the Black Sea.
- June 10 – 1952 San Juan earthquake. A magnitude 6.8 earthquake kills five people on Argentina's San Juan Province.
- June 13
  - "Catalina affair": Soviet MiG-15 fighter planes shoot down a Swedish military Douglas C-47 Skytrain, carrying out signals intelligence gathering operations over the Baltic Sea, killing all 8 crew; three days later they shoot down a Catalina flying boat, searching for possible survivors.
  - Polttoainehankinta, a secret Finnish Defence Forces operations order is approved.
- June 14 – Myxomatosis is introduced to Europe, on the French estate of Paul-Félix Armand-Delille.
- June 15 – Anne Frank's The Diary of a Young Girl is published in English-language translation.
- June 19 – The Special Forces (United States Army) are created.
- June 26 – The Pan-Malayan Labour Party is founded in Malaya, as a union of statewide labour parties.
- June 27 – Decree 900 in Guatemala orders the redistribution of uncultivated land.
- June 28 – The First Miss Universe pageant is held. Armi Kuusela from Finland wins the title of Miss Universe 1952.

=== July–August ===
- July 3 - The SS United States Has Her maiden voyage en route from New York To Southampton And wins the Blue Riband
- July 13 – East Germany announces the formation of its National People's Army.
- July 19–August 3 – The 1952 Summer Olympics are held in Helsinki, Finland.
- July 21 – The 7.3 M_{w} Kern County earthquake strikes California's southern Central Valley with a maximum Mercalli intensity of XI (Extreme), killing 12 and injuring hundreds.
- July 23
  - The European Coal and Steel Community is established.
  - General Mohammed Naguib leads the Free Officers (formed by Gamal Abdel Nasser – the real power behind the coup) in the overthrow of King Farouk of Egypt.
- July 26
  - King Farouk of Egypt abdicates, nominally in favour of his infant son Fuad II.
  - Maria Eva Duarte De Peron, known as "Evita", Argentina's first lady, dies aged 33 of cancer in Buenos Aires. The Argentine government's declaration of national mourning causes all business, entertainment, leisure and work to a standstill.
- August 5 – The Treaty of Taipei between Japan and the Republic of China goes into effect, officially ending the Second Sino-Japanese War.
- August 11 – The Jordanian Parliament forces King Talal of Jordan to abdicate due to mental illness; he is succeeded by his son King Hussein.
- August 12 – Night of the Murdered Poets: 13 Soviet Jewish poets are executed.
- August 13 – Japan joins the International Monetary Fund (IMF).
- August 14 – West Germany joins the IMF and the World Bank.
- August 16 – Lynmouth, North Devon, England is devastated by floods; 34 die.
- August 18 – A 7.5 earthquake shakes the Tibet region leaving a balance of 54 fatalities.
- August 22 – The most damaging aftershock of the 1952 Kern County earthquake sequence strikes with a moment magnitude of 5.8, and a maximum Mercalli intensity of VIII (Severe). This event damages several hundred buildings in Bakersfield, California, with total additional losses of $10 million, with two associated deaths and some injuries.
- August 26 – A British passenger jet makes a return crossing of the Atlantic Ocean in the same day.
- August 27 – Reparation negotiations between West Germany and Israel end in Luxembourg: Germany will pay 3 billion Deutsche Marks.
- August 29 – Composer John Cage's 4′33″, during which the performer does not play, premieres in Woodstock, New York.
- August 30 – The last Finnish war reparations are sent to the Soviet Union.
- August 31 – An accident causing 13 deaths results in closure of the Grenzlandring as an auto race circuit in Wegberg, Germany.

=== September–October ===
- September 2 – C. Walton Lillehei and F. John Lewis perform the first open-heart surgery, at the University of Minnesota.
- September 6 – The CBC in Montreal, Quebec, goes on air launching television in Canada.
- September 10 – The European Parliamentary Assembly (from March 1962, the European Parliament) opens.
- September 15 – The United Nations cedes Eritrea to Ethiopia.
- September 18 – The Soviet Union vetoes Japan's application for membership in the United Nations.
- September 30 – The Revised Standard Version of the Bible is published in the United States.
- October 8 – Three trains collide in the Harrow and Wealdstone rail crash near London, England, killing 112 people and injuring 340 people, making it the worst rail disaster in the UK since the 1915 Quintinshill rail disaster.
- October 14 – The United Nations begins work in the new United Nations building in New York City, designed by Le Corbusier and Oscar Niemeyer.
- October 17 – 17 October affair: Indonesian troops led by General Nasution surround the presidential palace, seeking the dismissal of the People's Representative Council; Sukarno avoids confrontation.
- October 19 – Alain Bombard begins to sail from the Canary Islands to Barbados in 65 days without using provisions; he reaches them December 23.
- October 20 – Martial law is declared in Kenya, in the face of the Mau Mau uprising.
- October 23 – The West German Federal Constitutional Court bans the Socialist Reich Party as unconstitutional for being a Nazi Party successor organization.

=== November–December ===
- November 1 – Nuclear testing and Operation Ivy: The United States successfully detonates the first hydrogen bomb, codenamed "Mike", at Eniwetok Atoll in the Marshall Islands in the central Pacific Ocean, with a yield of 10.4 megatons.

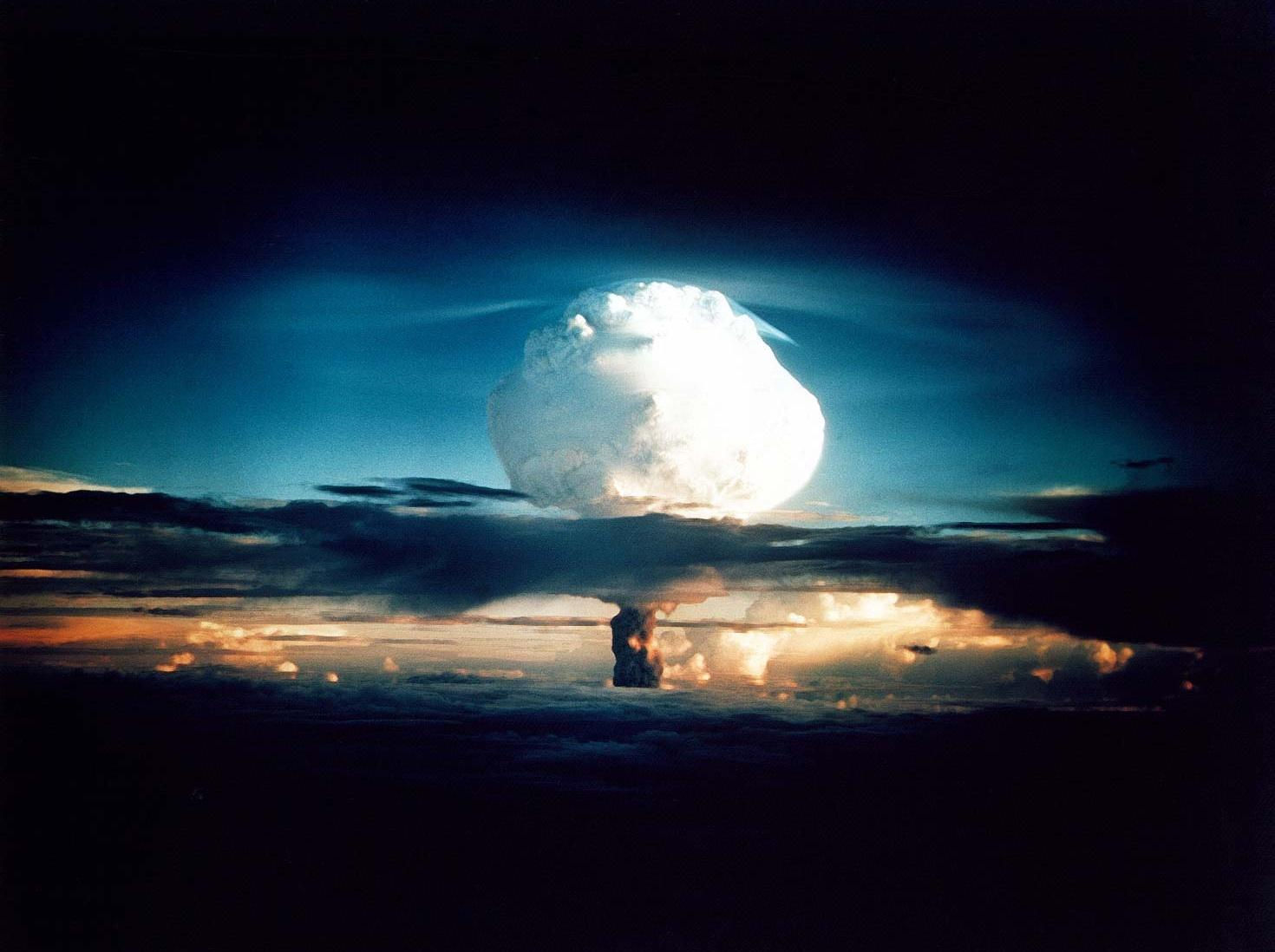
The explosion of the first hydrogen bomb.

- November 4
  - 1952 United States presidential election: Republican General Dwight D. Eisenhower defeats Democratic Governor of Illinois Adlai Stevenson (correctly predicted by the UNIVAC computer).
  - Pace-Finletter MOU 1952: A Memorandum of understanding is signed between "...Air Force Secretary Finletter and Army Secretary Pace that established a fixed wing weight limit [for the Army] of five thousand pounds empty, but weight restrictions on helicopters were eliminated..."
- November 5 – The 9.0 M_{w} Severo-Kurilsk earthquake hits the Kamchatka Peninsula of the Soviet Union with a maximum Mercalli intensity of XI (Extreme). A tsunami took the lives of more than 2,300 people.
- November 18 – Jomo Kenyatta is arrested in Kenya, for an alleged connection to the Mau Mau Uprising.
- November 20
  - The first official passenger flight over the North Pole is made, from Los Angeles to Copenhagen.
  - One of the first successful gender-affirming surgeries is performed in Copenhagen on Christine Jorgensen.
- November 29 – Korean War: U.S. President-elect Dwight D. Eisenhower fulfills a political campaign promise, by traveling to Korea to find out what can be done to end the conflict.
- December 1 – Adolfo Ruiz Cortines takes office as President of Mexico.
- December 10 – Albert Schweitzer is given the 1952 Nobel Peace Prize.
- December 14 – The first successful surgical separation of conjoined twins is conducted in Mount Sinai Hospital, Cleveland, Ohio.
- December 20 – The crash of a United States Air Force C-124 Globemaster at Moses Lake, WA kills 86 servicemen.
- December 25 – One West German soldier is killed in a shooting incident in West Berlin.
- December 26 – Joseph Ivor Linton, the first Israeli Minister Plenipotentiary in Japan, presents his credentials to the Emperor of Japan.

=== Date unknown ===
- The Nordic Council agrees to the unrestricted transport of people, goods and services throughout the Nordic Countries.
- Supramar launches the first commercial high-speed craft, a hydrofoil.
- During the Mau Mau Uprising, the poisonous latex of the African milk bush is used to kill cattle, in an incident of Biological warfare.
- Slavery in Qatar is abolished.

== Births ==
=== January ===
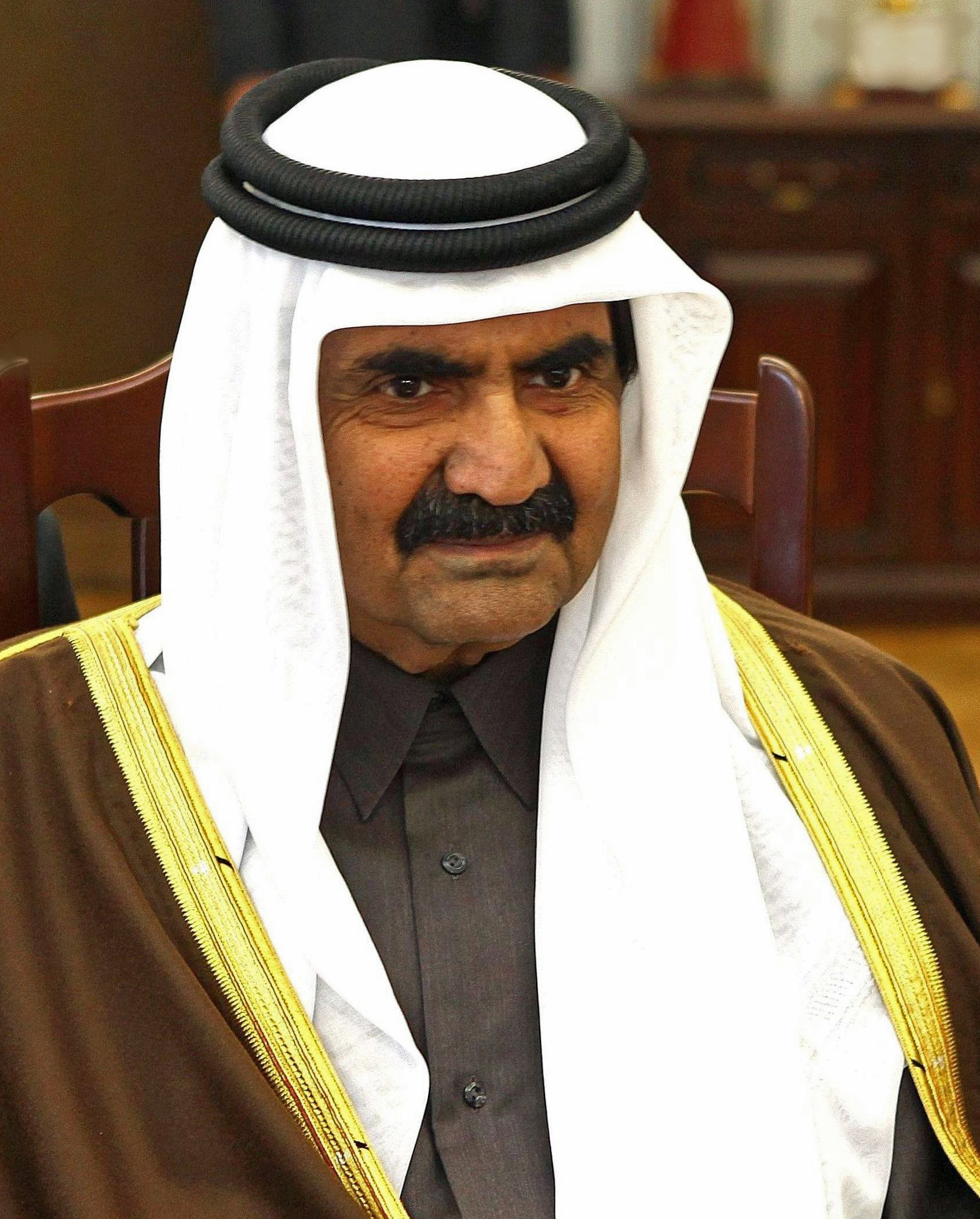
Hamad bin Khalifa Al Thani

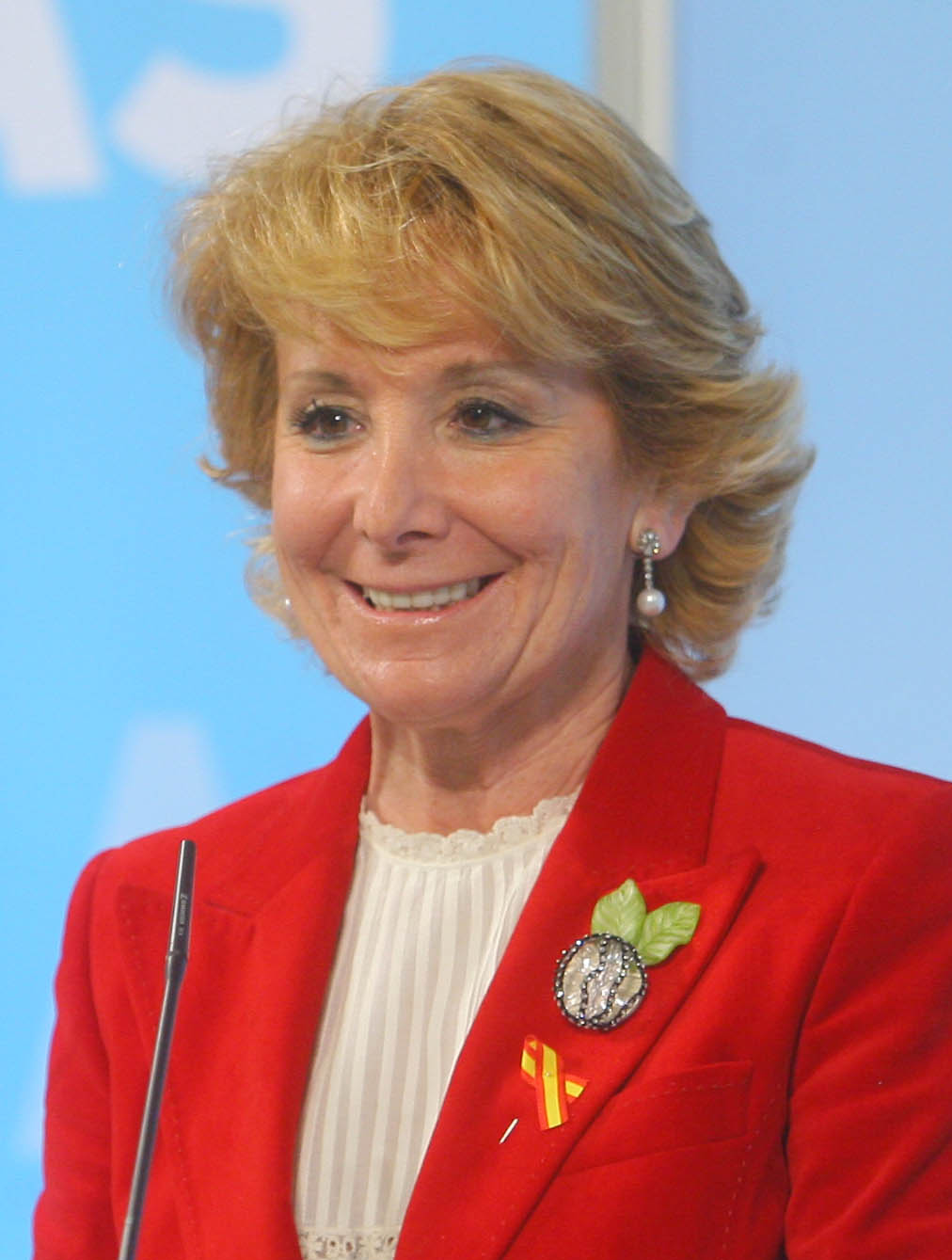
Esperanza Aguirre

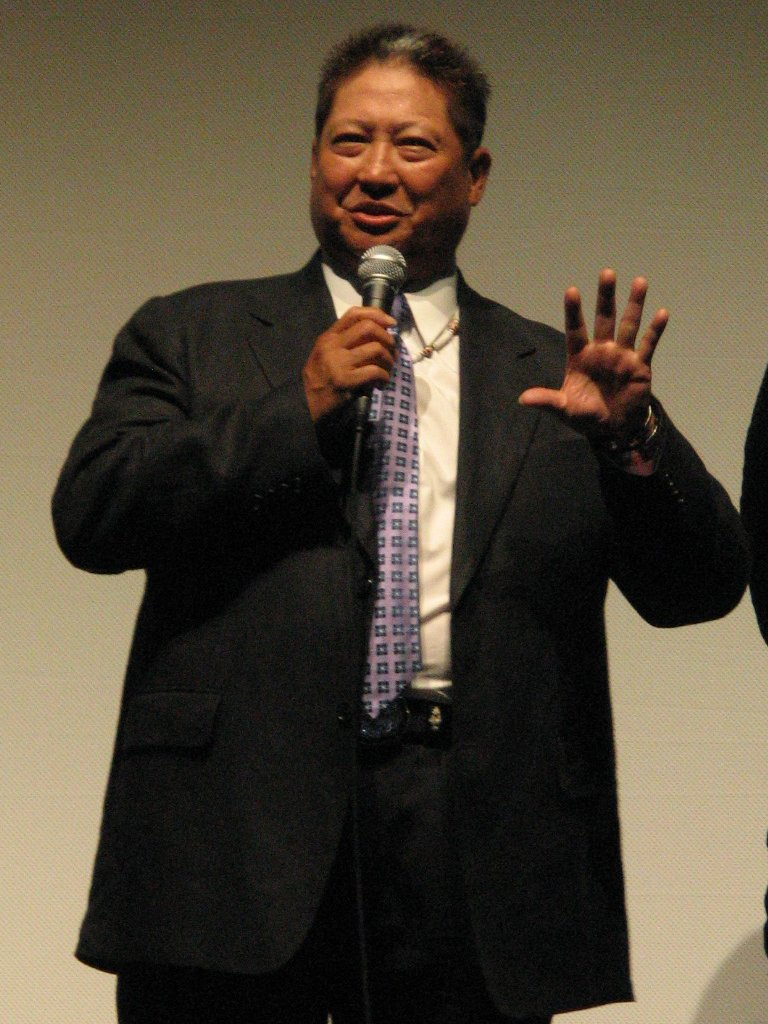
Sammo Hung

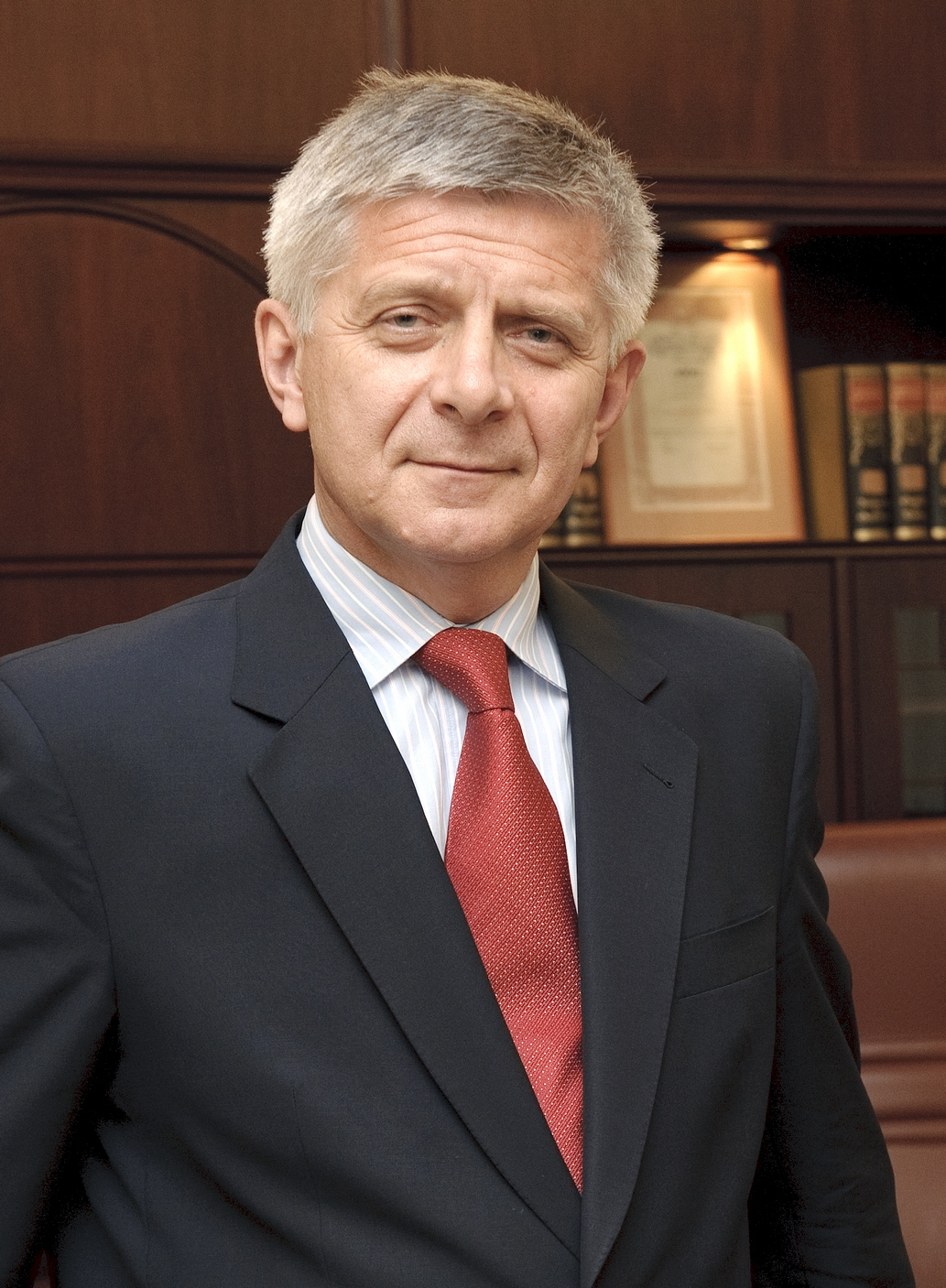
Marek Belka

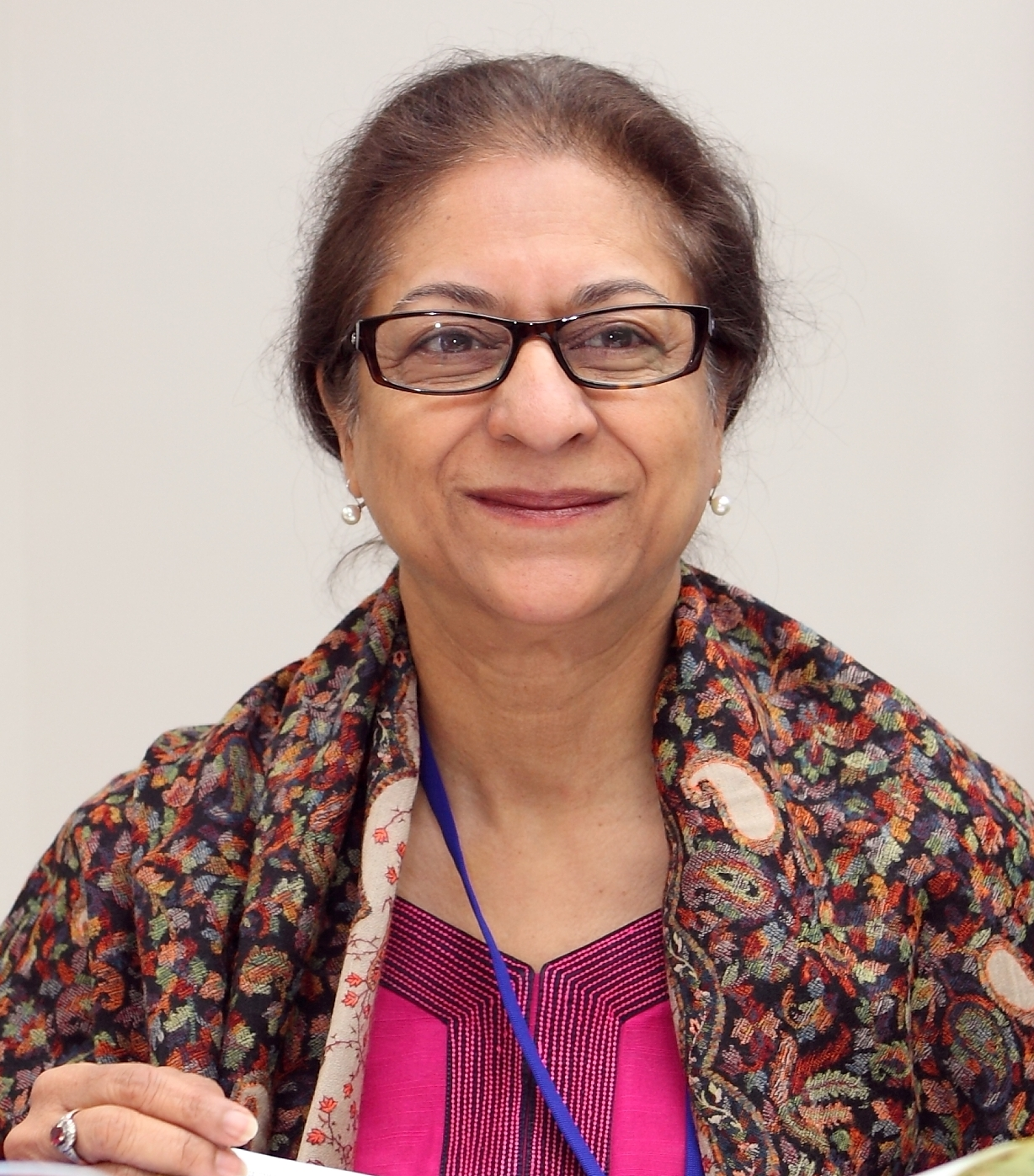
Asma Jahangir

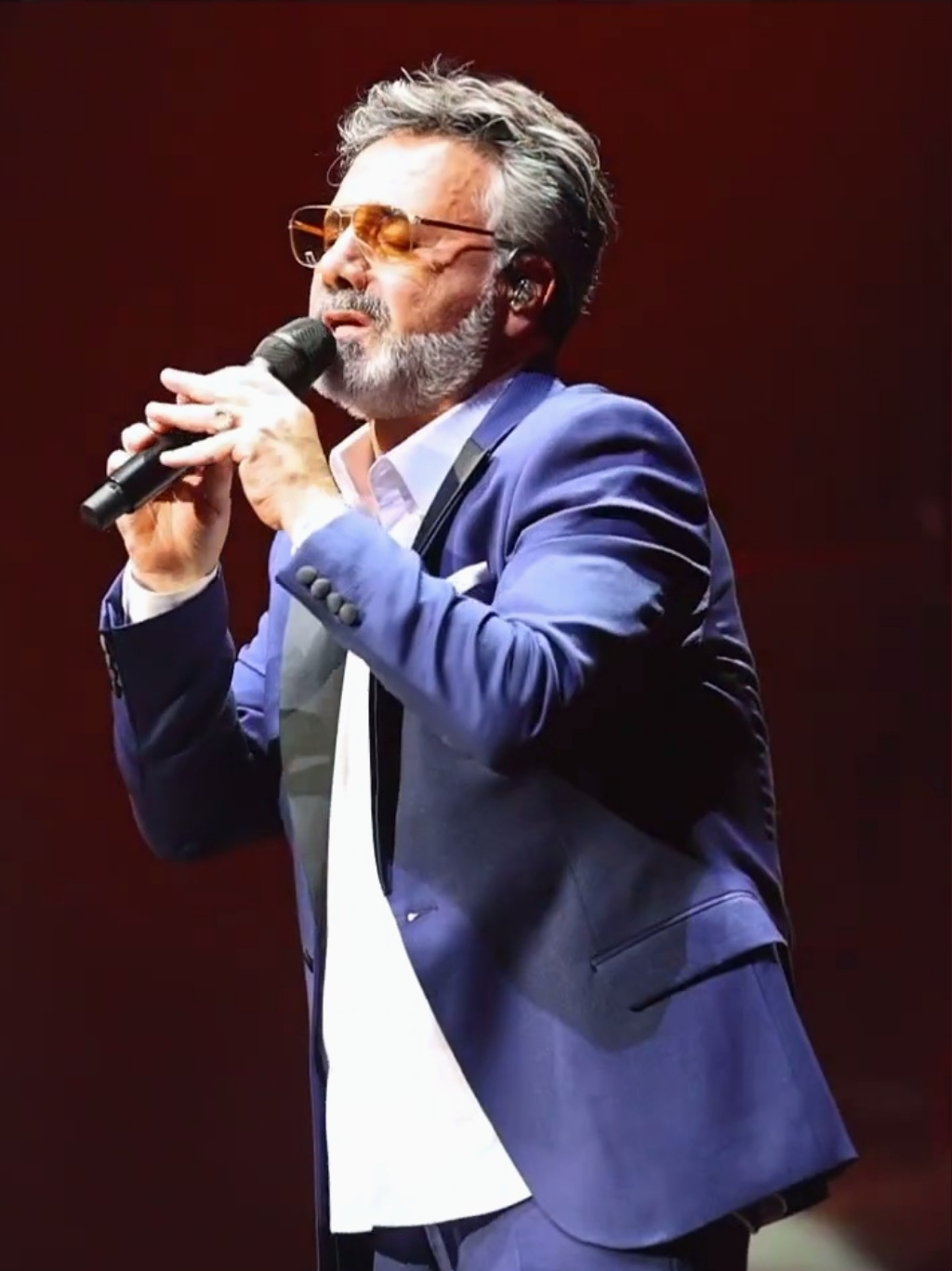
Moein (singer)

- January 1 – Hamad bin Khalifa Al Thani, Emir of Qatar (d. 2026)
- January 2 – Elvira Saadi, Soviet gymnast
- January 3
  - Esperanza Aguirre, Spanish politician
  - Jim Ross, American wrestling announcer
- January 7 – Sammo Hung, Hong Kong martial arts superstar, producer and director
- January 9 – Marek Belka, 11th Prime Minister of Poland
- January 11 – Belkisyole Alarcón de Noya, Venezuelan physician and parasitologist
- January 12 – Walter Mosley, American author
- January 13 - Salai Sun Ceu, Burmese singer (d. 2004)
- January 14 – Călin Popescu-Tăriceanu, 60th Prime Minister of Romania
- January 15
  - Boris Blank, Swiss musician
  - Muhammad Wakkas, Bangladeshi teacher and parliamentarian
- January 17 – Ryuichi Sakamoto, Japanese electronic musician, composer, producer and actor (Yellow Magic Orchestra) (d. 2023)
- January 20
  - Moein, Iranian Singer
  - Paul Stanley, American singer (KISS)
- January 24 – Raymond Domenech, French football player, manager
- January 25
  - Sara Mandiano, French singer-songwriter
  - Peter Tatchell, Australian-born British human rights activist
- January 27
  - Brian Gottfried, American tennis player
  - Asma Jahangir, Pakistani human rights activist, lawyer (d. 2018)
- January 29
  - Klaus-Peter Hanisch, German footballer (d. 2009)
  - Paul Tesanovich, American politician from Michigan
- January 30 – Valery Khalilov, Russian military band conductor (d. 2016)

=== February ===
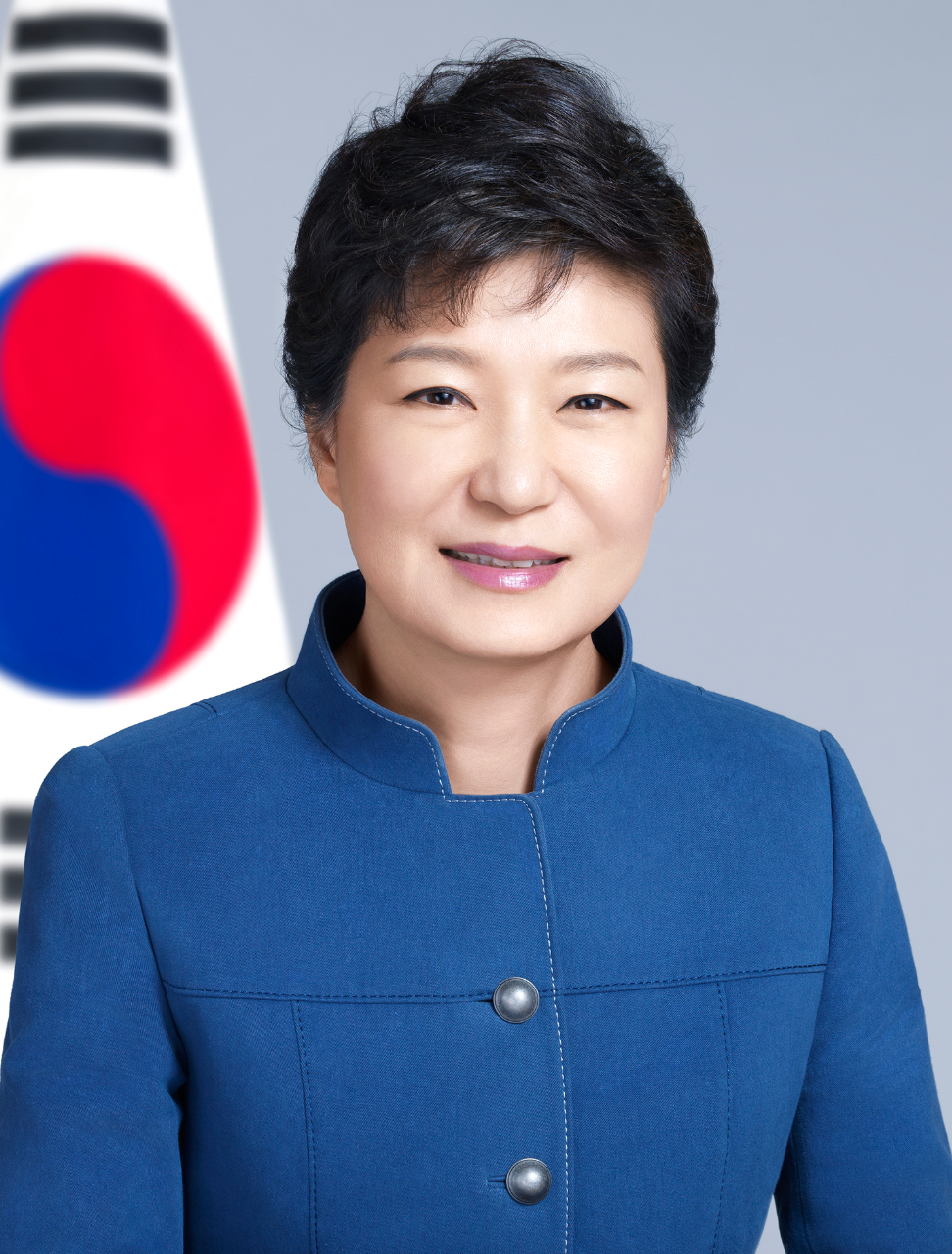
Park Geun Hye

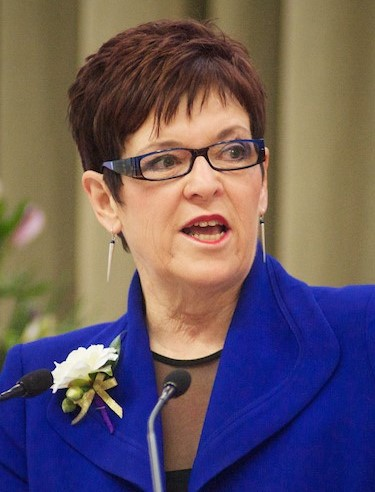
Jenny Shipley

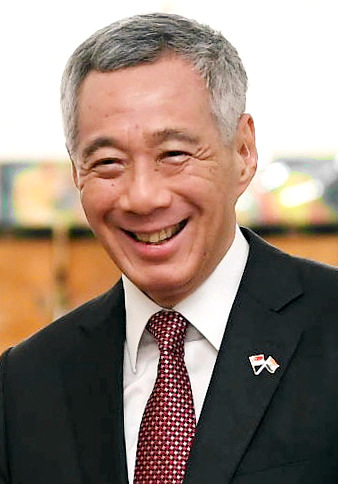
Lee Hsien Loong

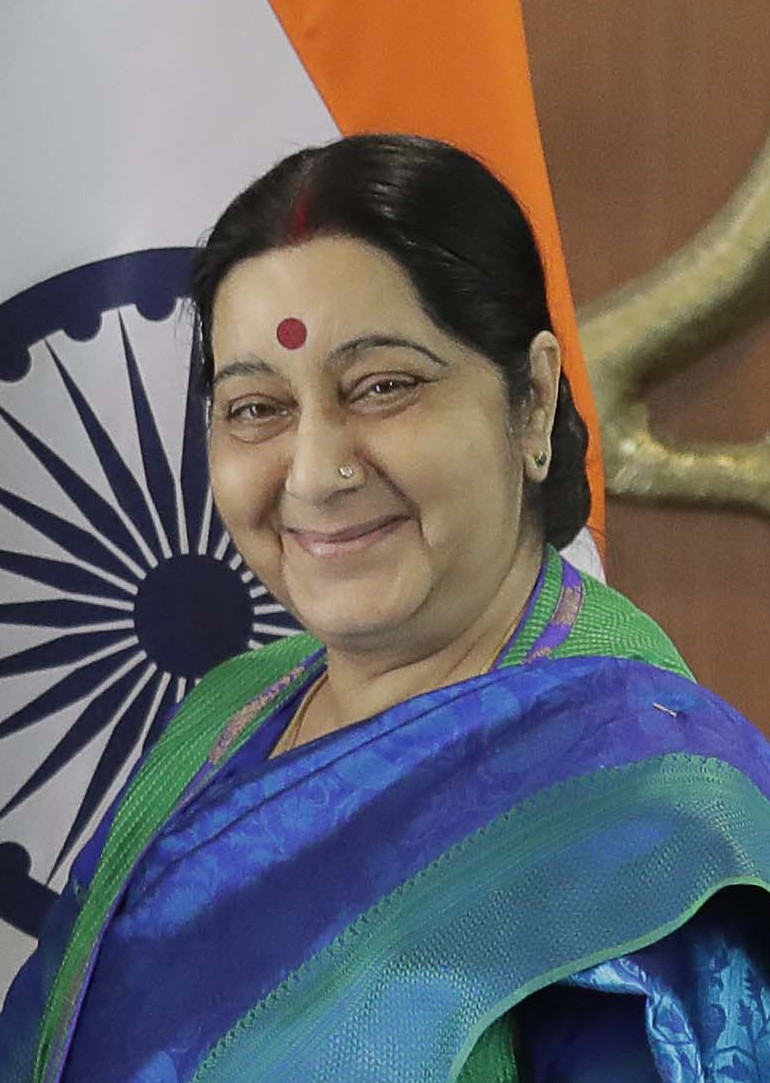
Sushma Swaraj

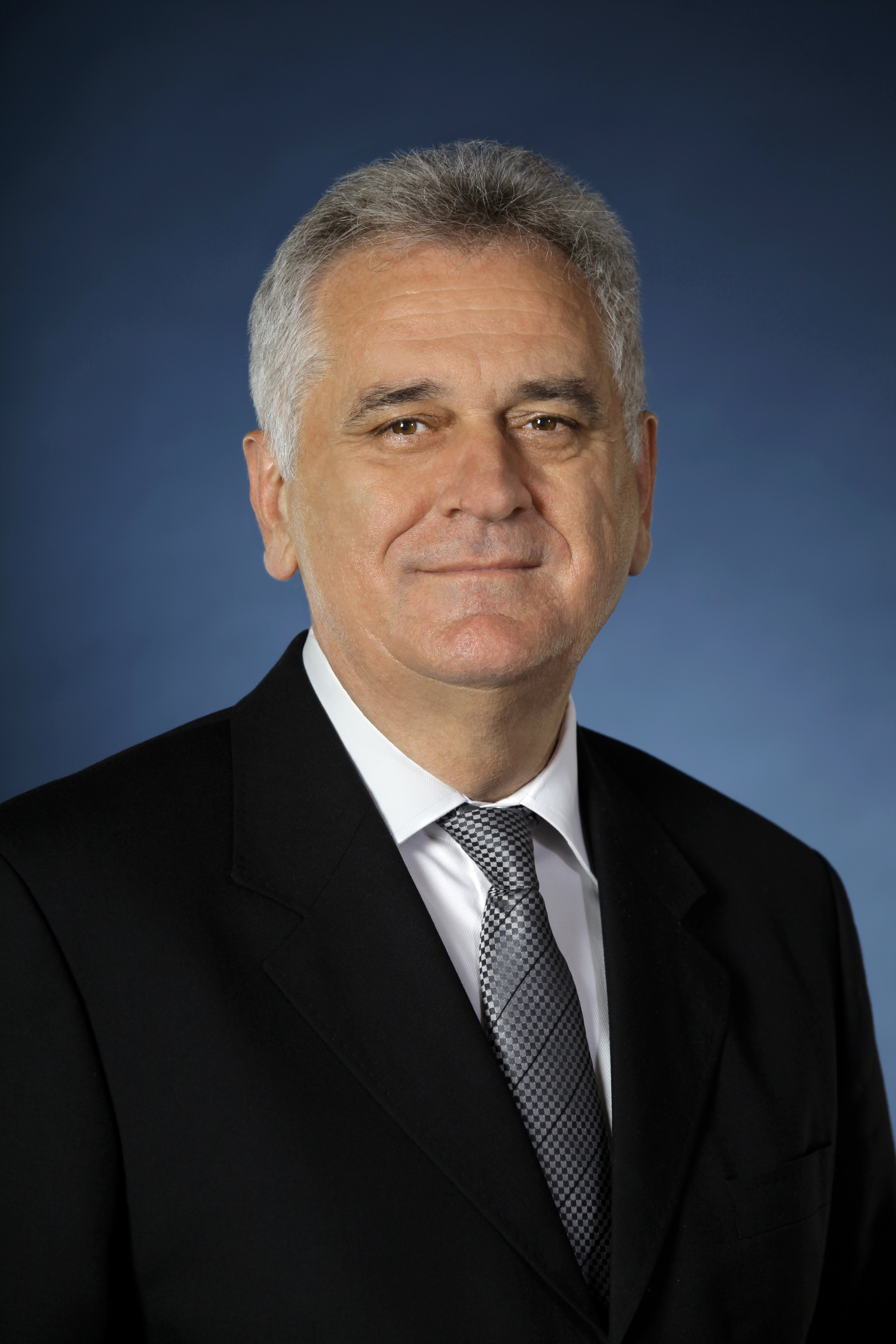
Tomislav Nikolić

- February 2 – Park Geun Hye, President of South Korea
- February 4
  - Abdalá Bucaram, 38th President of Ecuador
  - Jenny Shipley, Prime Minister of New Zealand
- February 7 – John Hickenlooper, American politician, 42nd Governor of Colorado
- February 8 – Nora Miao, Hong Kong actress
- February 10 – Lee Hsien Loong, 3rd Prime Minister of Singapore
- February 12 – Simon MacCorkindale, English actor (d. 2010)
- February 14 – Sushma Swaraj, Indian politician, at Ambala Cantonment, Haryana (d. 2019)
- February 15
  - Nikolai Sorokin, Soviet, Russian actor, theatre director (d. 2013)
  - Tomislav Nikolić, 4th President of Serbia
- February 16 – James Ingram, African-American R&B musician (d. 2019)
- February 17 – Javier Urruticoechea, Spanish footballer (d. 2001)
- February 19
  - Gary Seear, New Zealand rugby union player (d. 2018)
  - Amy Tan, American novelist (The Joy Luck Club)
- February 21
  - Vitaly Churkin, Russian diplomat (d. 2017)
  - Elisha Obed, Bahamian boxer (d. 2018)
- February 22
  - William Frist, U.S. Senator, heart surgeon
  - Saufatu Sopoanga, 8th Prime Minister of Tuvalu (d. 2020)
- February 25 – Joey Dunlop, Northern Irish motorcycle racer (d. 2000)

=== March ===
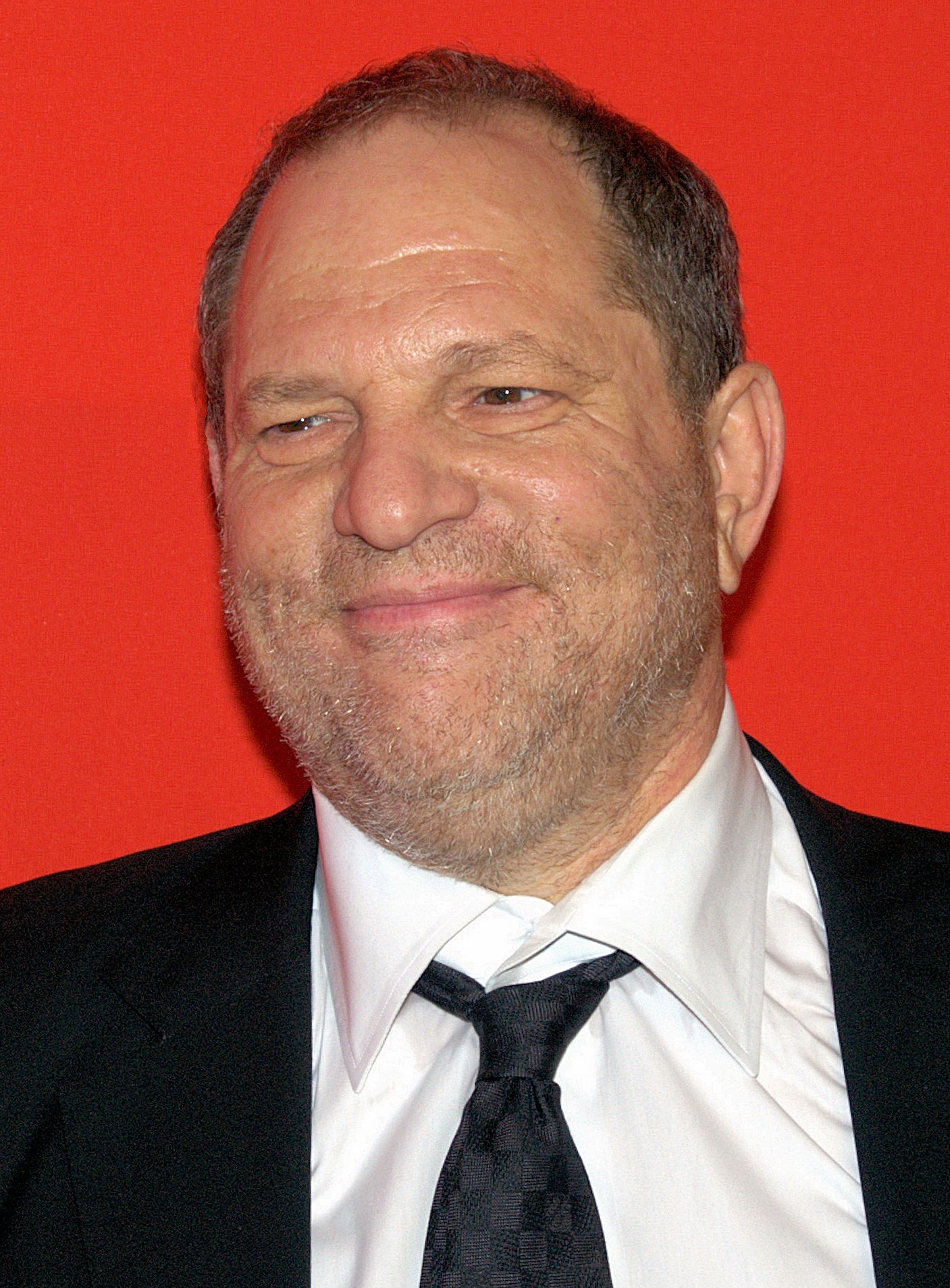
Harvey Weinstein

- March 1 - Janice Burgess, African-American television producer, creator of The Backyardigans (d. 2024)
- March 2 – Laraine Newman, American comedian (Saturday Night Live)
- March 4 – Umberto Tozzi, Italian singer
- March 7 – Viv Richards, West Indian cricketer
- March 10 – Morgan Tsvangirai, Zimbabwean politician, 2nd Prime Minister of Zimbabwe (d. 2018)
- March 11 – Douglas Adams, English author (The Hitchhiker's Guide to the Galaxy) (d. 2001)
- March 13
  - Ágnes Rapai, Hungarian writer
  - Wolfgang Rihm, German composer (d. 2024)
- March 14 – Martin Dempsey, United States Army general
- March 15 – Howard Devoto, British singer
- March 16 – Alice Hoffman, American novelist
- March 17 – Perla, Paraguayan-Brazilian singer
- March 18 – Salome Zourabichvili, Georgian politician, 5th President of Georgia
- March 19 – Harvey Weinstein, American film producer
- March 23
  - Kim Stanley Robinson, American author
  - Rex Tillerson, United States Secretary of State
  - Villano III, Mexican professional wrestler (d. 2018)
- March 24 – Reinhard Genzel, German astrophysicist, Nobel Prize recipient
- March 25
  - Jung Chang, Chinese-born author, historian
  - Antanas Mockus, Colombian mathematician, politician
- March 26 – Didier Pironi, French racing driver (d. 1987)
- March 27 – Maria Schneider, French actress (d. 2011)
- March 28 – Keith Ashfield, Canadian politician (d. 2018)
- March 29 –
  - Teofilo Stevenson, Cuban boxer (d. 2012)
  - Bola Tinubu, Nigerian politician, President of Nigeria
- March 31 – Dermot Morgan, Irish actor and comedian (d. 1998)

=== April ===
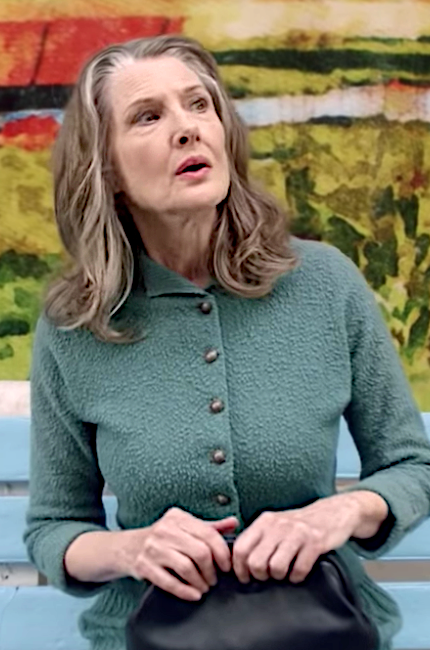
Annette O'Toole

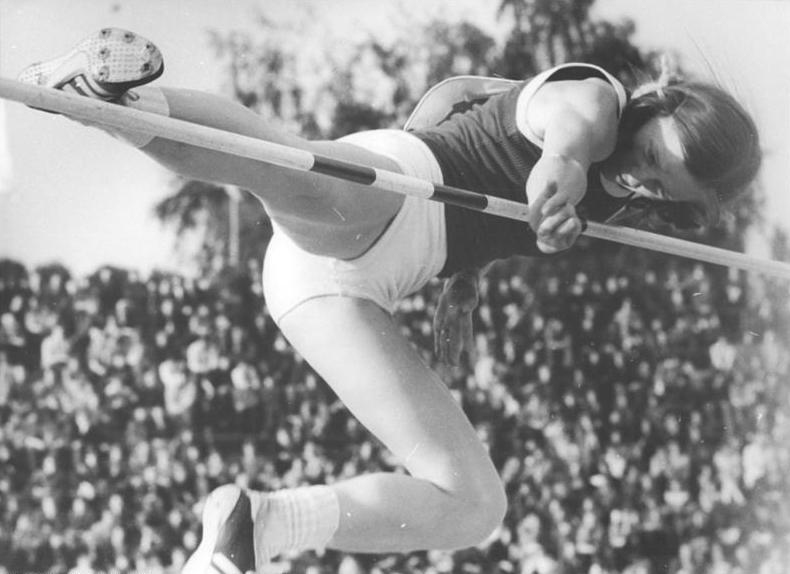
Rosemarie Ackermann

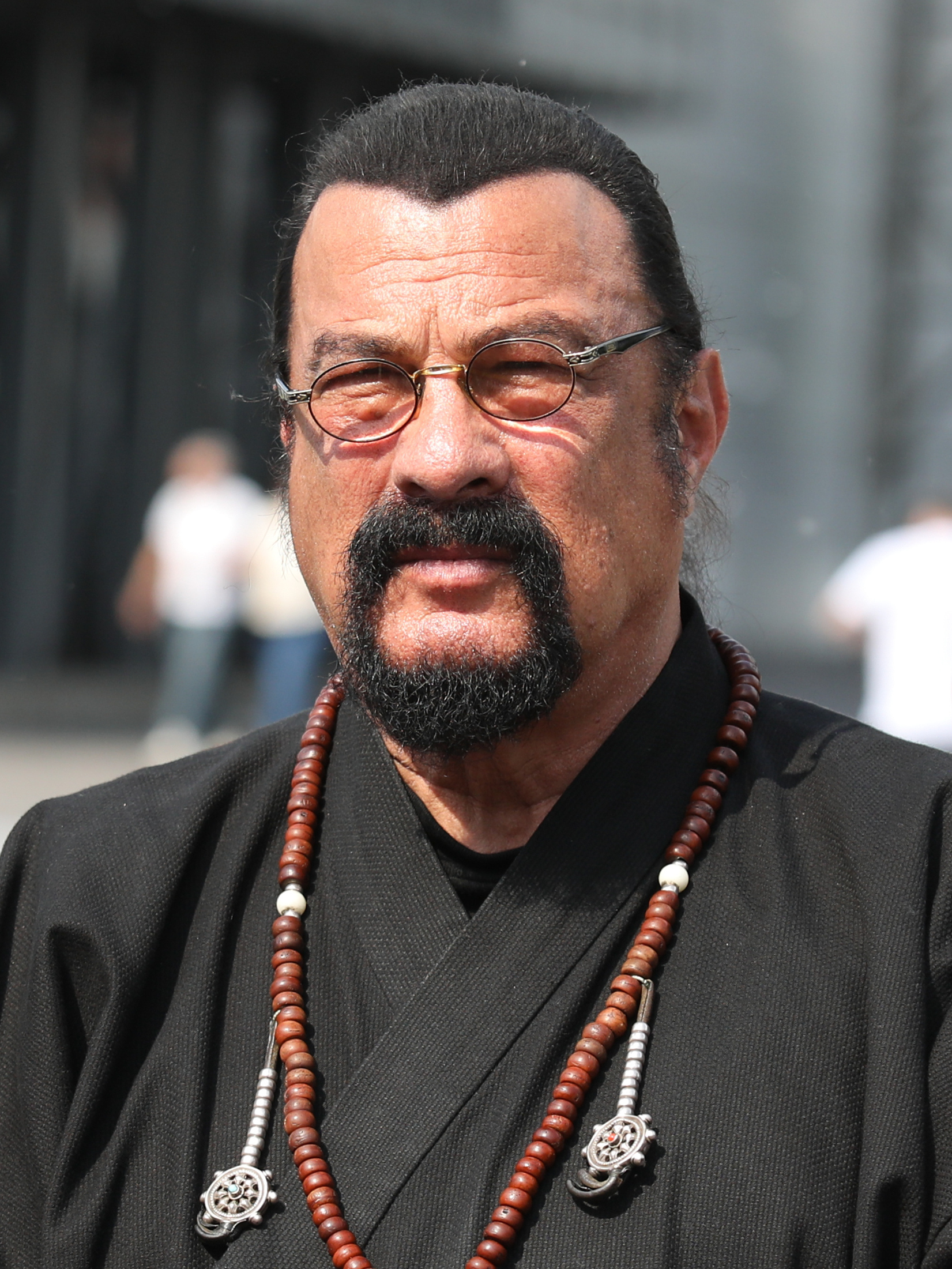
Steven Seagal

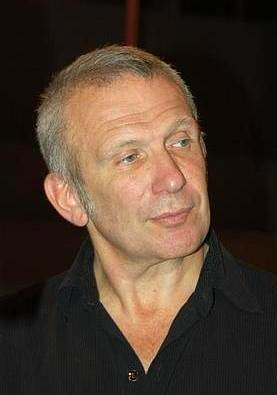
Jean-Paul Gaultier

- April 1
  - Annette O'Toole, American actress
  - Bernard Stiegler, French philosopher (d. 2020)
- April 2 – Lennart Fagerlund, Swedish cyclist
- April 4
  - Rosemarie Ackermann, German athlete
  - Gary Moore, Northern Irish musician (d. 2011)
  - Karen Magnussen, Canadian figure skater
- April 6 – Marilu Henner, American actress (Taxi) and writer
- April 7 – Nichita Danilov, Romanian writer
- April 10 – Steven Seagal, American actor
- April 11 – Qamar Zaman, Pakistani squash player
- April 15 – Glenn Shadix, American voice actor (d. 2010)
- April 16 – Billy West, American voice actor
- April 17
  - Joe Alaskey, American voice actor (d. 2016)
  - Željko Ražnatović, Serbian mobster, paramilitary leader (d. 2000)
- April 19 – Alexis Arguello, Nicaraguan boxer, politician (d. 2009)
- April 21 – Cheryl Gillan, British politician (d. 2021)
- April 23 – Jean-Dominique Bauby, French journalist and author (d. 1997)
- April 24 – Jean-Paul Gaultier, French Haute couture, Prêt-à-Porter fashion designer
- April 25
  - Ketil Bjørnstad, Norwegian pianist
  - Vladislav Tretiak, Russian ice hockey player
- April 27 – George Gervin, American basketball player
- April 28 – Mary McDonnell, American actress

=== May ===
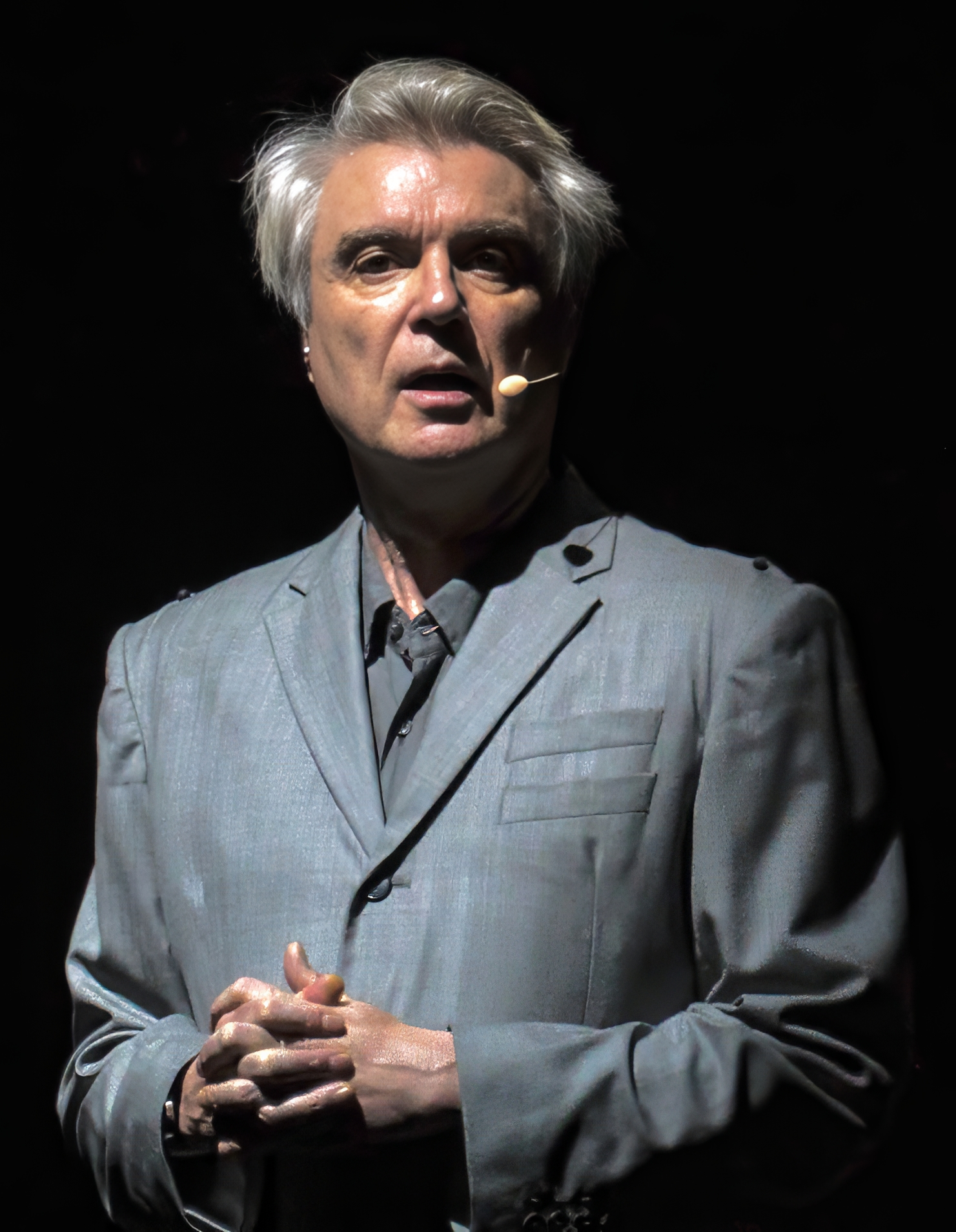
David Byrne

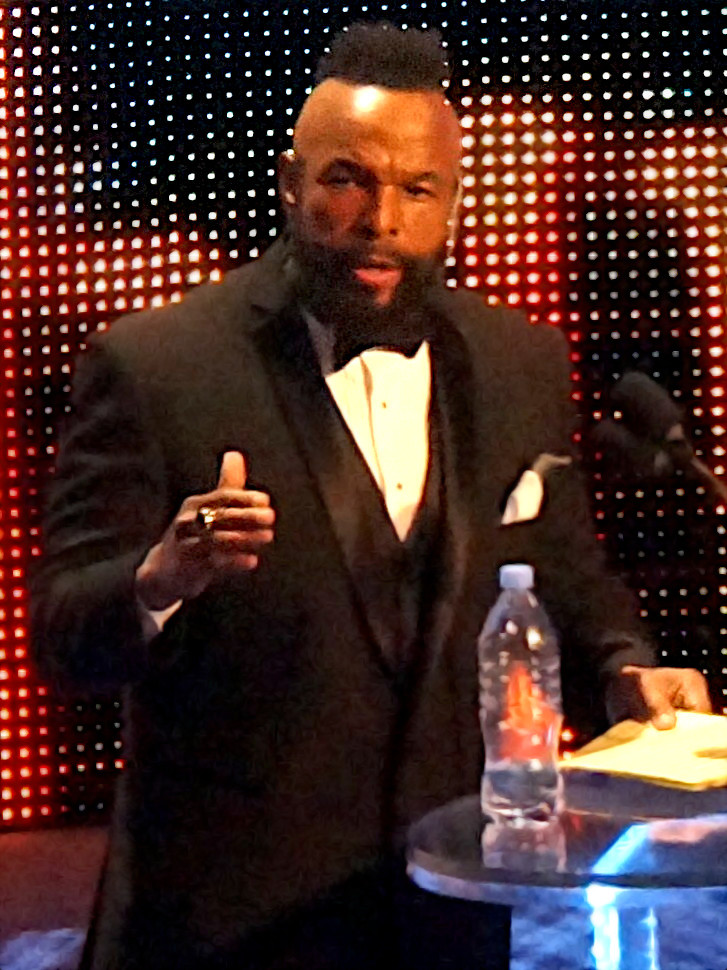
Mr. T

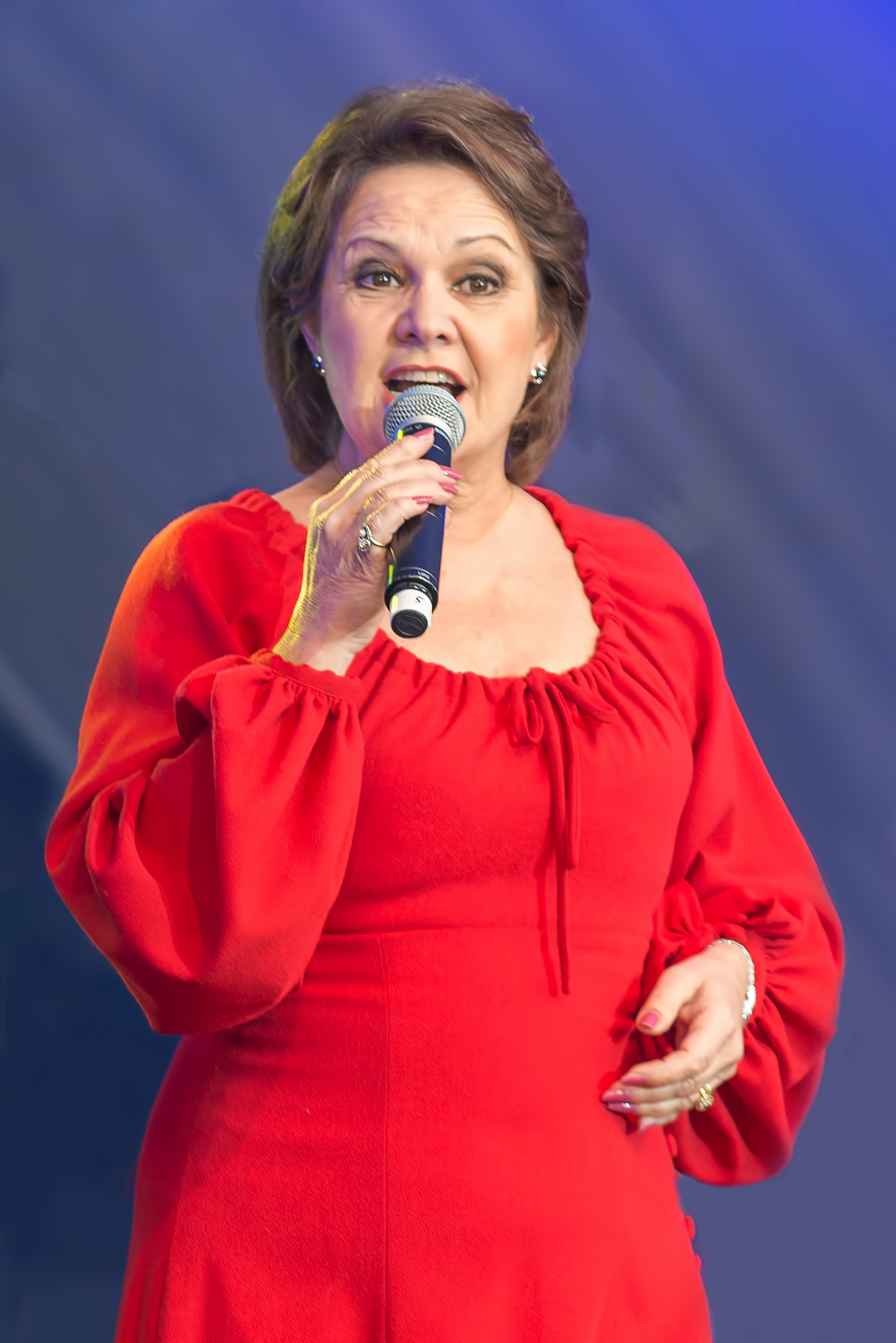
Anne-Marie David

- May 1 – Mike Thornton, British politician
- May 2 – Christine Baranski, American actress
- May 3
  - Leonid Khachiyan, Russian-born mathematician
  - Allan Wells, Scottish athlete
- May 4 – Michael Barrymore, British comedian, TV presenter
- May 6 – Michael O'Hare, American actor (d. 2012)
- May 10
  - Roland Kaiser, German singer
  - Manuel Mora Morales, Spanish director, writer
- May 11
  - Shohreh Aghdashloo, Iranian actress
  - Frances Fisher, British-born American actress
  - Renaud, French composer
- May 12 – Christopher Gaze, British voice actor
- May 13 – John Kasich, Governor of Ohio
- May 14
  - Robert Zemeckis, American film director (Back to the Future)
  - David Byrne, Scottish singer-songwriter (Talking Heads)
- May 15 – Chazz Palminteri, American actor
- May 16 – Stann Champion, American-born guitarist, singer, songwriter, and producer (d. 2022)
- May 18 – George Strait, American country musician
- May 19 – Bert van Marwijk, Dutch football manager
- May 20 – Roger Milla, Cameroonian footballer
- May 21 – Mr. T, African-American actor (The A-Team)
- May 23 – Anne-Marie David, French singer, Eurovision Song Contest 1973 winner
- May 24 – Sybil Danning, Austrian actress
- May 31 – Carole Achache, French writer, photographer and actress (d. 2016)

=== June ===
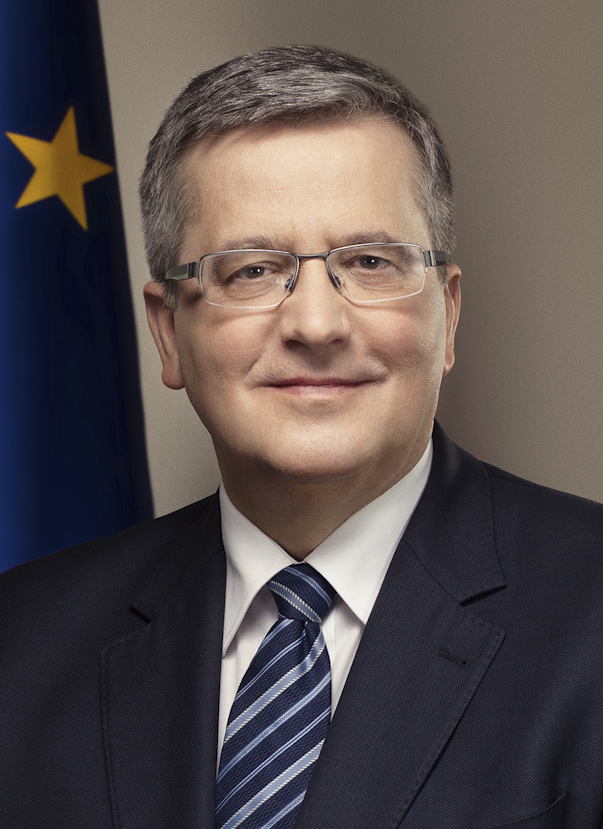
Bronisław Komorowski

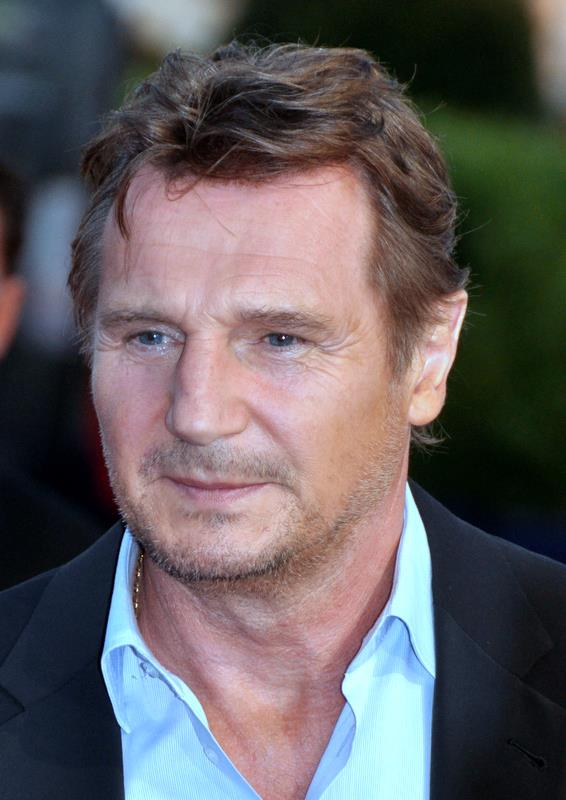
Liam Neeson

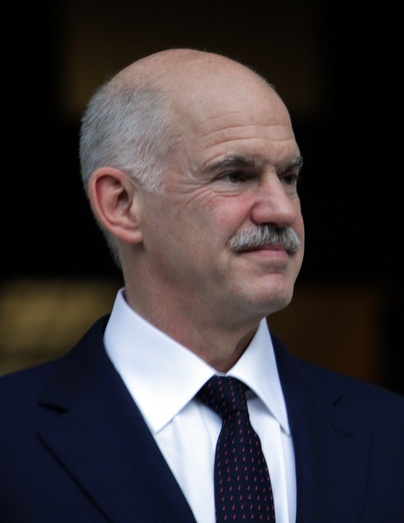
George Papandreou

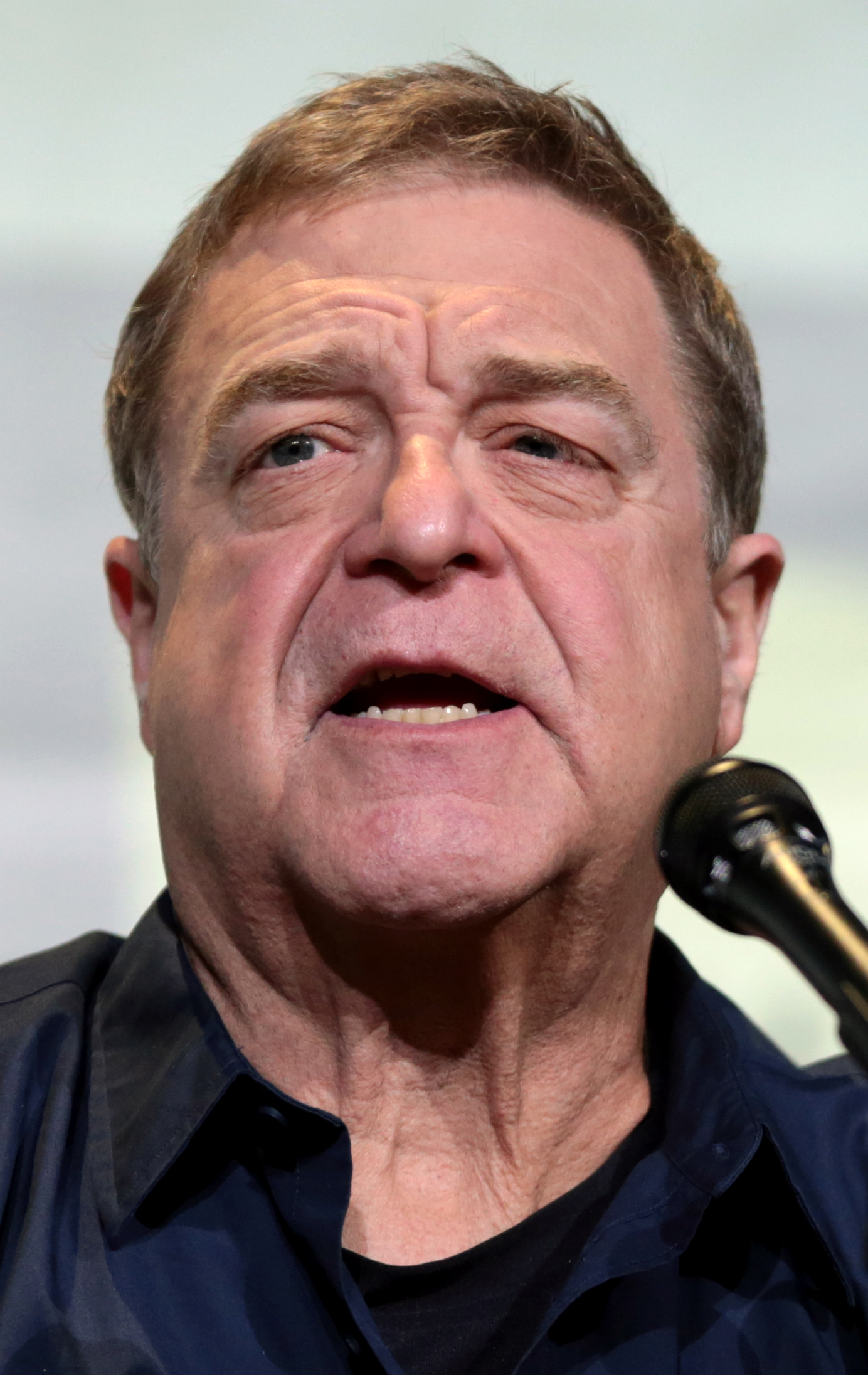
John Goodman

- June 4 – Bronisław Komorowski, President of Poland
- June 6
  - Marsha Blackburn, American politician and businesswoman
  - Yukihiro Takahashi, Japanese drummer and singer (d. 2023)
- June 7
  - Hubert Auriol, French racing driver (d. 2021)
  - Liam Neeson, Northern Irish actor (Schindler's List)
  - Orhan Pamuk, Turkish writer, Nobel Prize winner
- June 14 – Pat Summitt, American basketball coach (d. 2016)
- June 16
  - George Papandreou, Prime Minister of Greece
  - Gino Vannelli, Canadian singer, songwriter
- June 17
  - Sergio Marchionne, Italian-Canadian executive (d. 2018)
  - Sarbjit Singh Chadha, Indian enka singer
- June 18
  - Idriss Déby Itno, President of Chad (d. 2021)
  - Carol Kane, American actress
  - Isabella Rossellini, Italian model, actress
- June 20
  - John Goodman, American actor
  - Vikram Seth, Indian novelist
- June 21
  - Jeremy Coney, New Zealand cricket captain
  - Marcella Detroit, American singer (Shakespears Sister)
  - Ginny Ruffner, American artist
- June 22
  - Franco Cucinotta, Italian professional footballer
  - Graham Greene, Canadian actor (d. 2025)
  - Alastair Stewart, British newsreader
  - Santokh Singh, Malaysian footballer
- June 23 – Peter Whiteside, British modern pentathlete
- June 24
  - Ladislas Lozano, French-Spanish football coach, retired player
  - Stephen Pusey, British-born artist
- June 25
  - Péter Erdő, Hungarian cardinal
  - Tim Finn, New Zealand singer, songwriter
- June 28 – Pietro Mennea, Italian athlete (d. 2013)
- June 29 – Joe Johnson, English snooker player
- June 30 – Stein Olav Hestad, Norwegian footballer

=== July ===
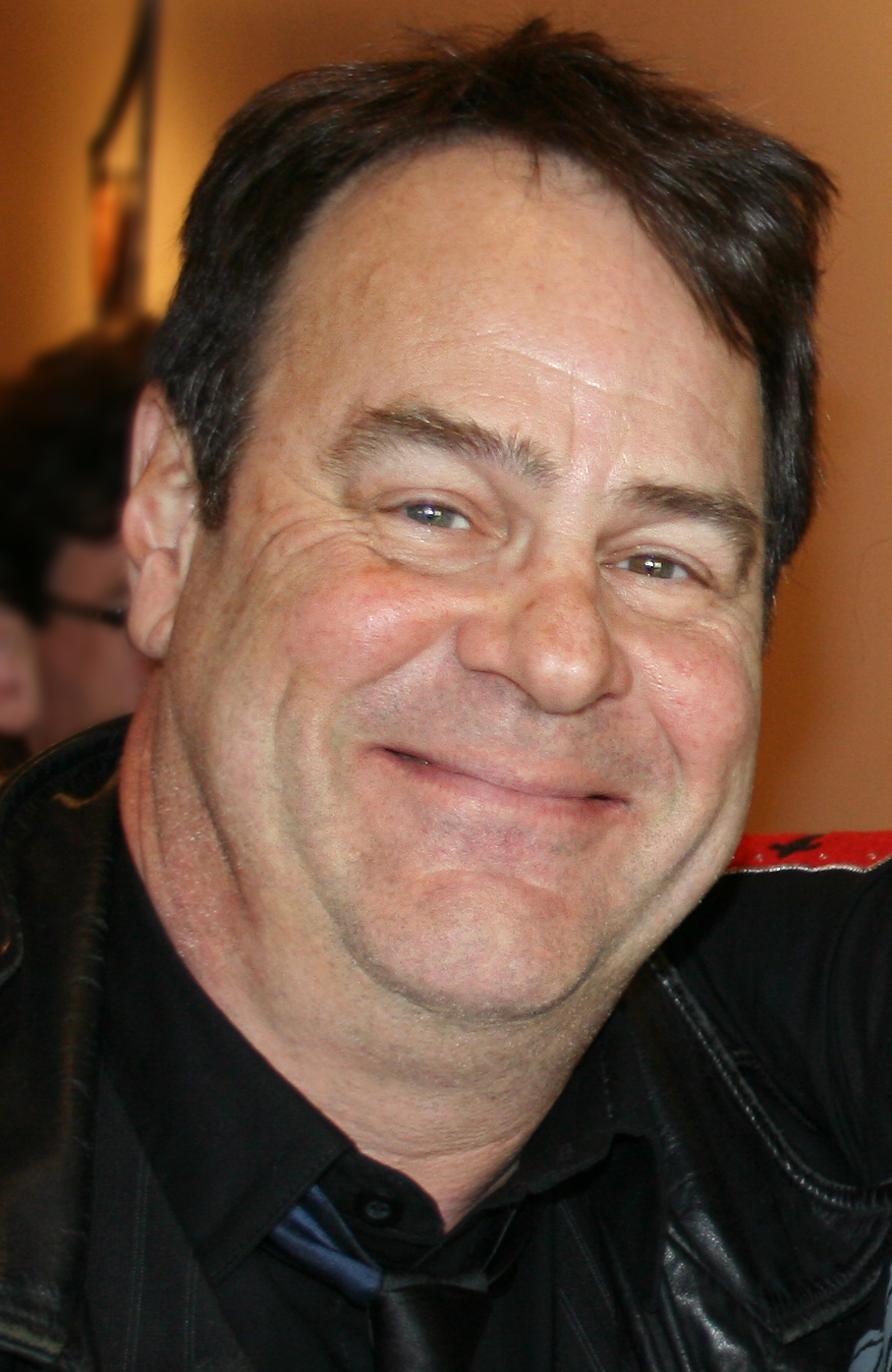
Dan Aykroyd

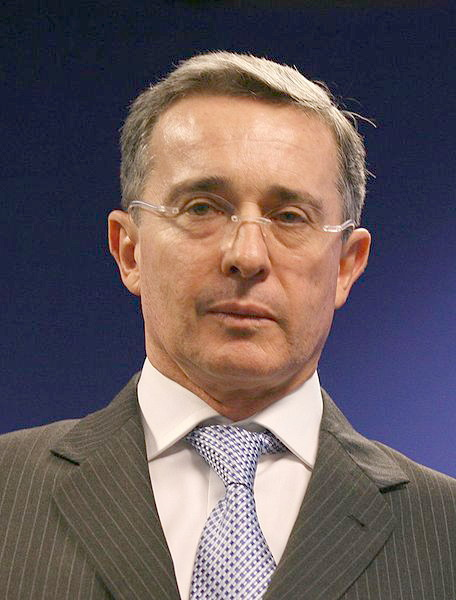
Álvaro Uribe

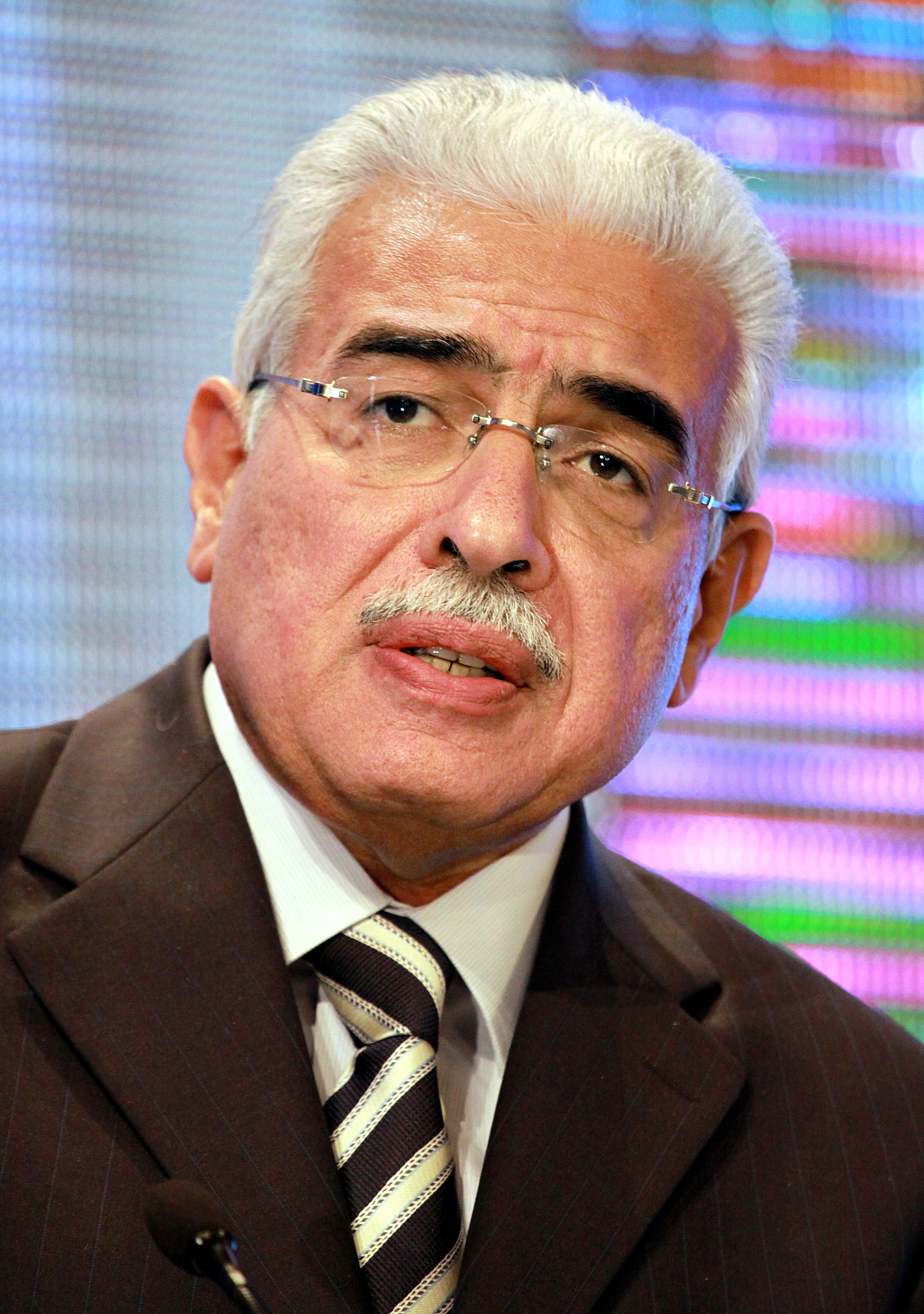
Ahmed Nazif

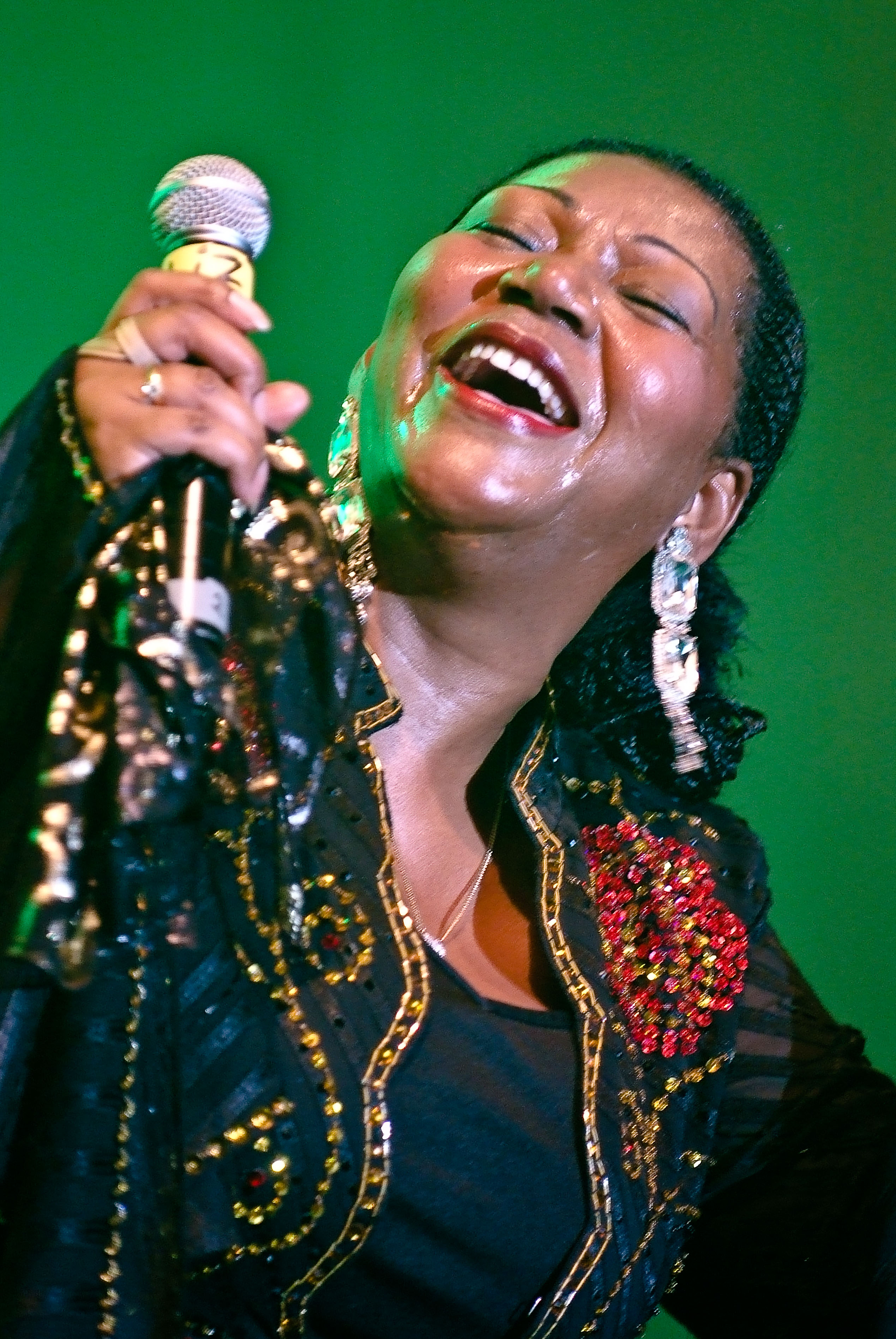
Liz Mitchell

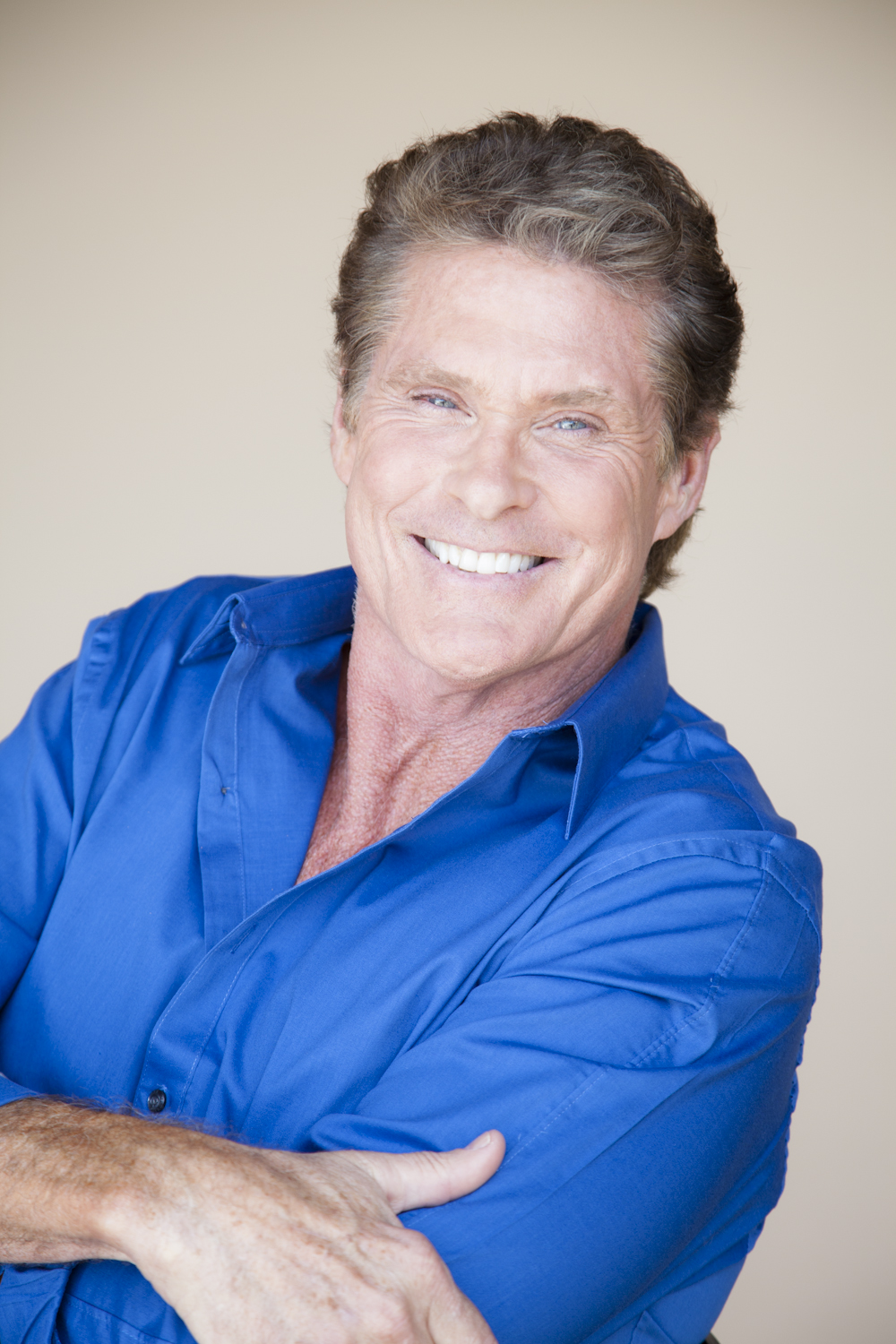
David Hasselhoff

- July 1
  - Brian George, Israeli-English actor, voice artist, comedian and singer
  - Dan Aykroyd, Canadian actor, comedian (Saturday Night Live)
  - Dale Hayes, South African professional golfer
- July 2
  - Linda M. Godwin, American scientist
  - Ahmed Ouyahia, Algerian politician
  - Marco Piccinini, Monegasque sport personality, businessman, and politician
- July 3
  - Laura Branigan, American singer, actress ("Self Control") (d. 2004)
  - Lu Colombo, Italian singer
  - Andy Fraser, English musician (d. 2015)
  - Rohinton Mistry, Indian writer
- July 4
  - Álvaro Uribe, President of Colombia
  - John Waite, English singer, musician
- July 6
  - Adi Shamir, Israeli cryptographer
  - Ani Yudhoyono, 6th First Lady of Indonesia (d. 2019)
  - Kim Chul-soo, South Korean footballer
- July 7
  - Li Hongzhi, Chinese-American founder, spiritual leader of Falun Gong
  - Alain Cortes, French modern pentathlete
- July 8
  - Ahmed Nazif, Prime Minister of Egypt
  - Knud Arne Jürgensen, Danish music, theater and ballet historian
- July 10
  - Evelio Leonardia, Filipino politician
  - Anam Ramanarayana Reddy, Indian politician
- July 11 – Stephen Lang, American actor
- July 12
  - Irina Bokova, Bulgarian diplomat and civil servant
  - Voja Antonić, Serbian inventor, writer
  - Liz Mitchell, Jamaican-born singer (Boney M.)
- July 13 – Ricardo Boechat, Argentine-Brazilian journalist, anchor and radio announcer (d. 2019)
- July 15
  - Yuriko Koike, Japanese politician (Governor of Tokyo)
  - Terry O'Quinn, American actor
  - Marky Ramone, American musician
- July 16 – Stewart Copeland, American rock musician (The Police)
- July 17 – David Hasselhoff, American actor (Knight Rider)
- July 18 – Albert Camille Vital, Prime Minister of Madagascar
- July 19 – Allen Collins, American rock musician (Lynyrd Skynyrd) (d. 1990)
- July 21 – Ahmad Husni Hanadzlah, Malaysian Minister of Finance
- July 24
  - Kamrul Hasan Bhuiyan, Bangladeshi military officer, writer (d. 2018)
  - Gus Van Sant, American film director
- July 25 – Eduardo Souto de Moura, Portuguese Architect
- July 26 – Hezi Leskali, Israeli poet and artist (d. 1994)
  - James Mason, American neo-Nazi
- July 28 – Vajiralongkorn, King of Thailand (Rama X)
- July 31
  - João Barreiros, Portuguese author
  - Md. Abdul Wares, Bangladeshi politician

=== August ===
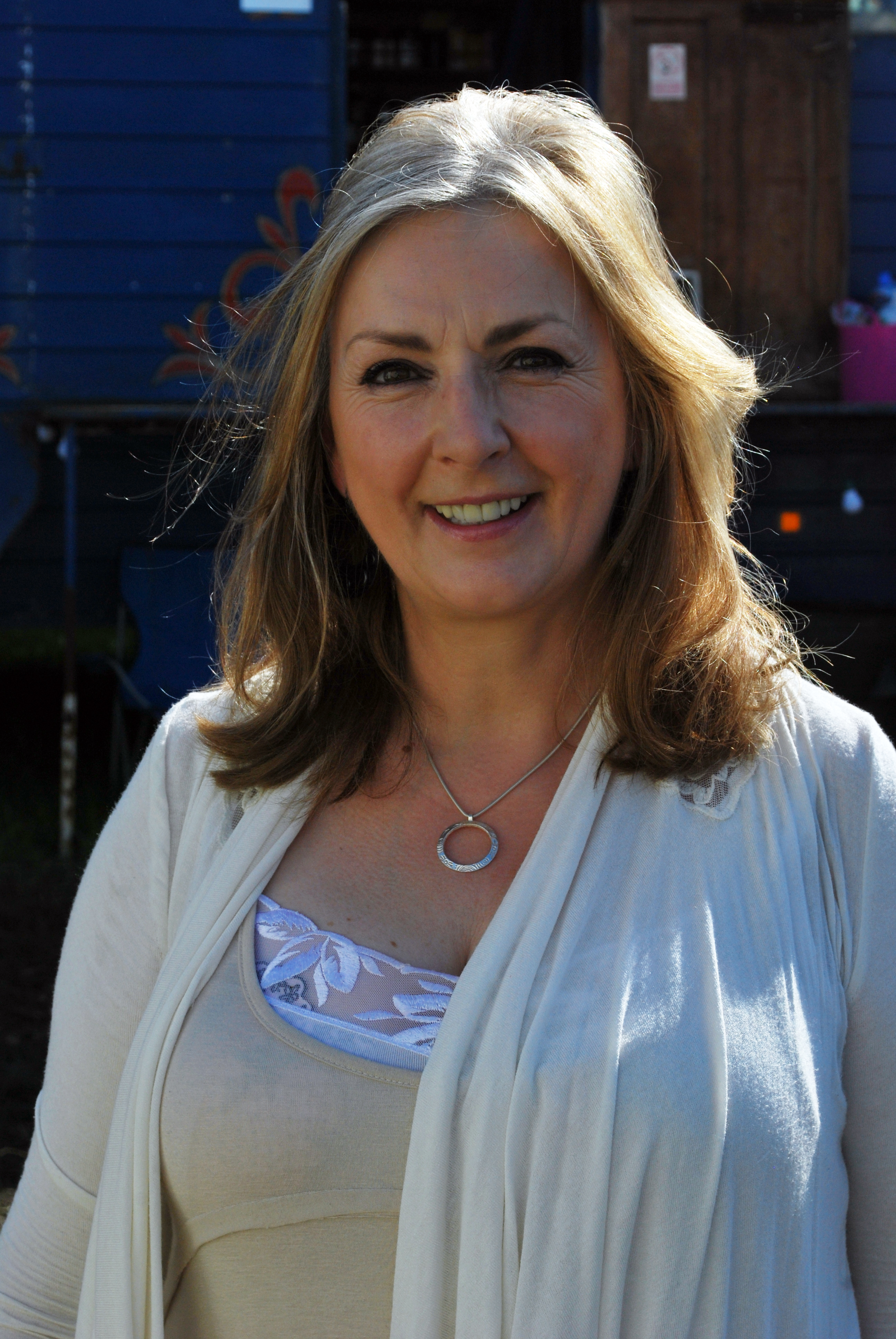
Moya Brennan

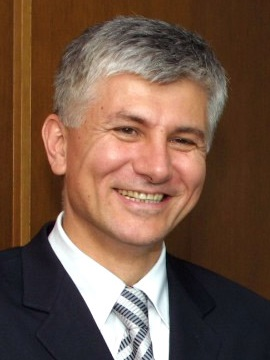
Zoran Đinđić

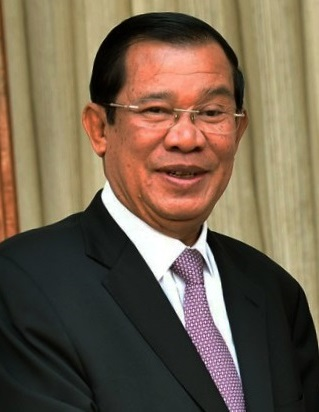
Hun Sen

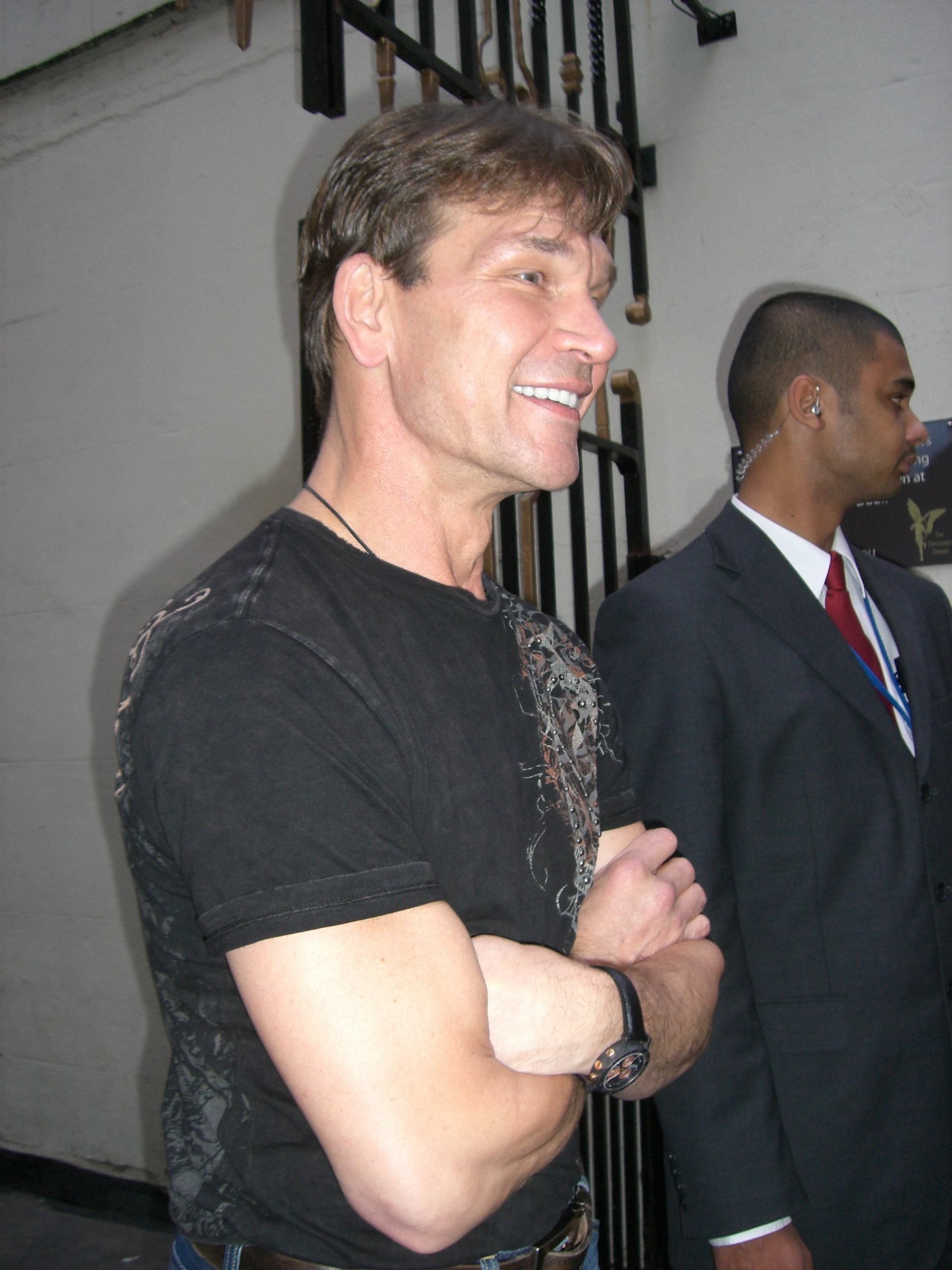
Patrick Swayze

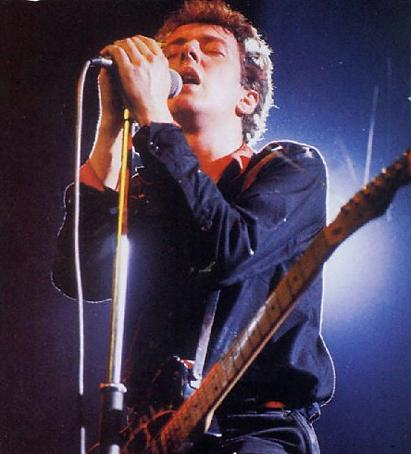
Joe Strummer

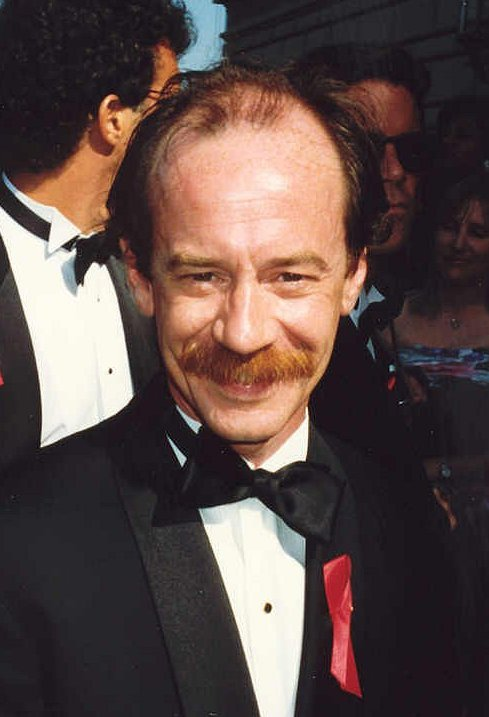
Michael Jeter

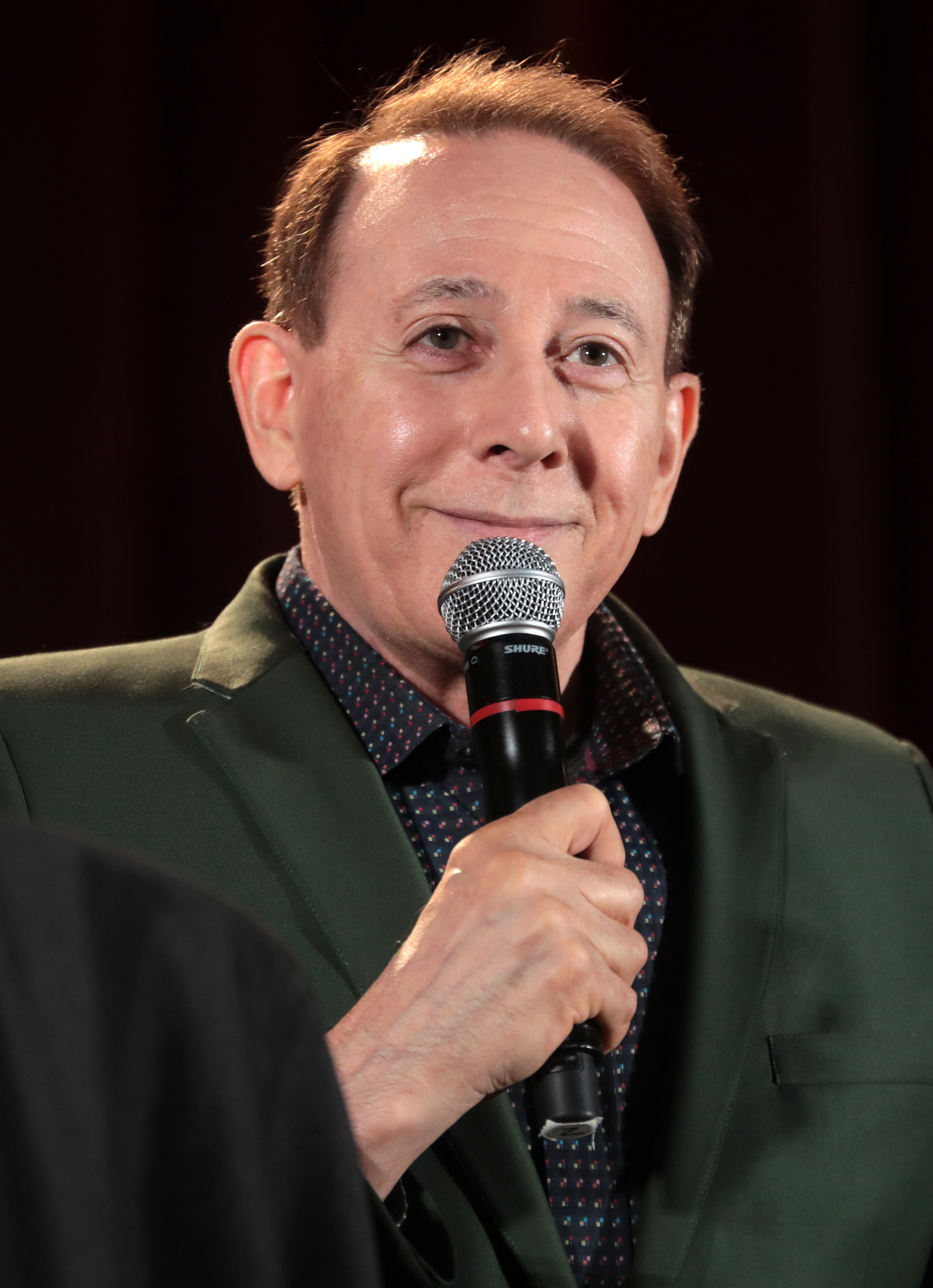
Paul Reubens

- August 1 – Zoran Đinđić, Prime Minister of Serbia (d. 2003)
  - Brian Patrick Clarke, American film actor
- August 3 – Osvaldo Ardiles, Argentine footballer
- August 4
  - Estanislau da Silva, Prime Minister of East Timor
  - Moya Brennan, Irish singer and musician (d. 2026)
- August 5
  - Hun Sen, Prime Minister of Cambodia
  - Louis Walsh, Irish music producer, reality TV show judge
- August 6 – Wojciech Fortuna, Polish ski jumper
- August 8 – Jostein Gaarder, Norwegian author
- August 12 – Charlie Whiting, British motorsports director (d. 2019)
- August 14 – Jeanette Oppenheim, Danish lawyer and politician
- August 16 – Reginald VelJohnson, American actor
- August 17 – Guillermo Vilas, Argentine tennis player
- August 18 – Patrick Swayze, American actor and dancer (d. 2009)
- August 19
  - Jonathan Frakes, American actor (Star Trek: The Next Generation)
  - Phạm Thị Hải Chuyền, Vietnamese politician
- August 21
  - Joe Strummer, British rock musician (The Clash) (d. 2002)
  - Jiří Paroubek, 6th Prime Minister of the Czech Republic
- August 24 – Linton Kwesi Johnson, Jamaican-born musician, poet
- August 25 – Charles M. Rice, American virologist, Nobel Prize recipient
- August 26
  - Bryon Baltimore, Canadian ice hockey player
  - Michael Jeter, American film, stage, and television actor (d. 2003)
- August 27 – Paul Reubens, American actor, writer and comedian (Pee-Wee Herman) (d. 2023)
- August 28
  - Rita Dove, American poet (1987 Pulitzer Prize, United States Poet Laureate 1993–95)
  - Wendelin Wiedeking, German businessman
- August 31
  - Eli Gorenstein, Israeli actor, voice actor and cellist
  - Hilary Farr, British-Canadian actress, designer

=== September ===
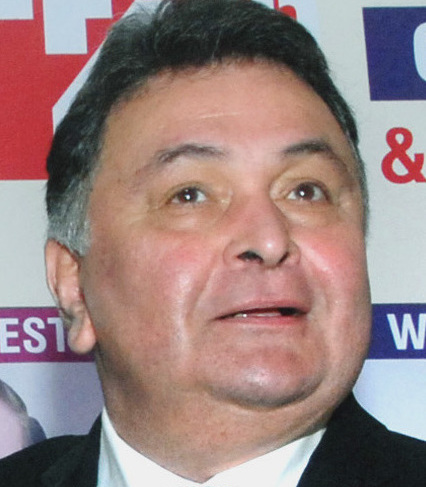
Rishi Kapoor

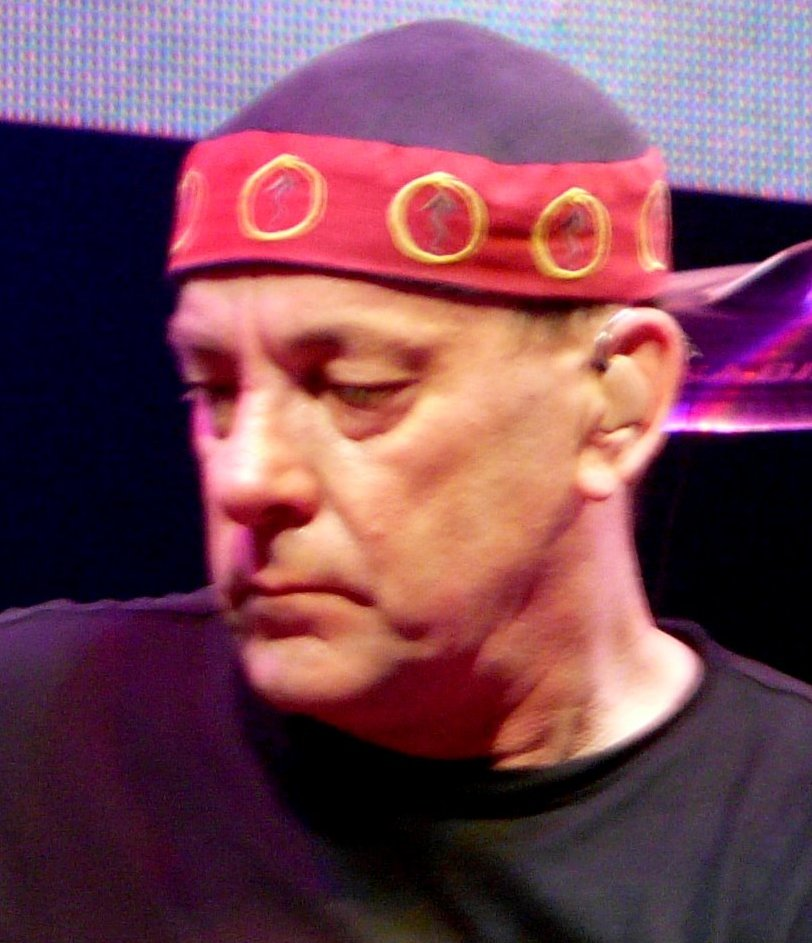
Neil Peart

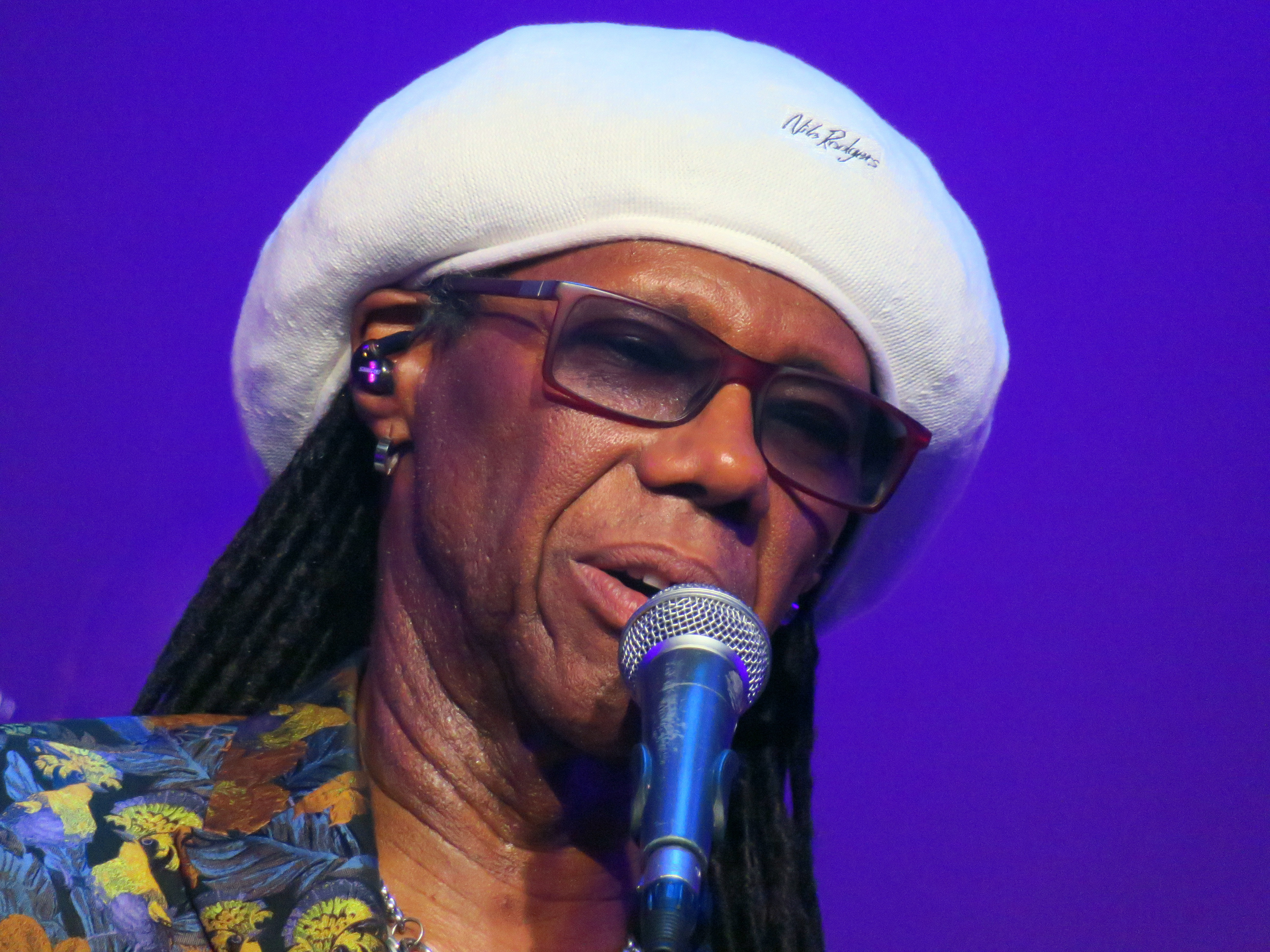
Nile Rodgers

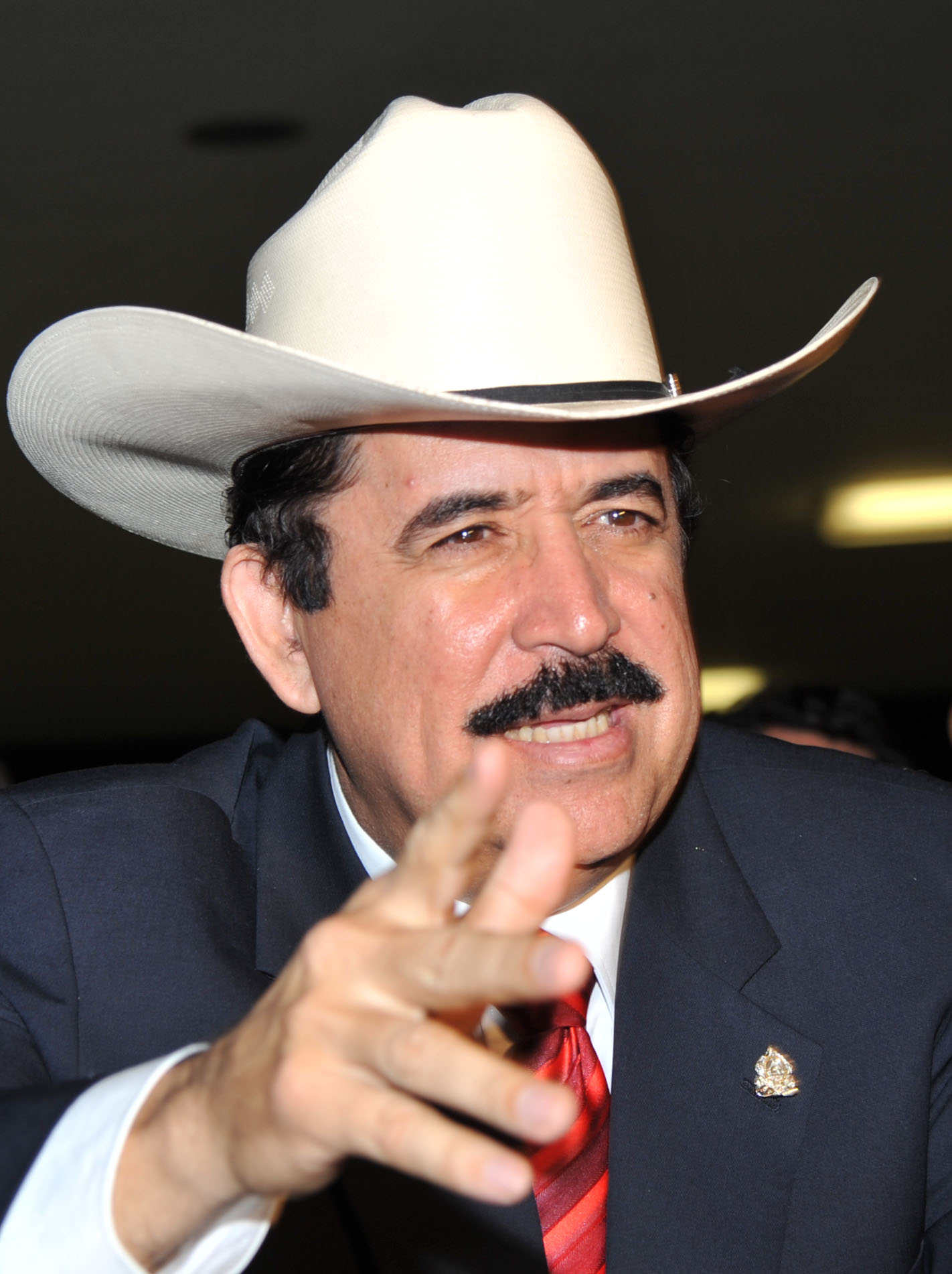
Manuel Zelaya

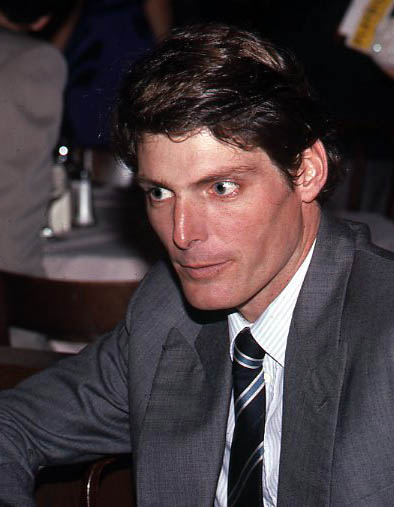
Christopher Reeve

- September 2
  - Jimmy Connors, American tennis player
  - Yuen Wah, Hong Kong martial actor
- September 4 – Rishi Kapoor, Indian actor (d. 2020)
- September 6 – Lucky Enam, Bangladeshi actress
- September 8 – Patrick Prosser, Scottish computer scientist
- September 10 – Paulo Betti, Brazilian actor
- September 12
  - Sergey Karaganov, Russian political scientist
  - Neil Peart, Canadian rock drummer (Rush) (d. 2020)
- September 16
  - Karen Muir, South African swimmer (d. 2013)
  - Fatos Nano, former Prime Minister of Albania (d. 2025)
  - Mickey Rourke, American film actor, former boxer
- September 17 – Harold Solomon, American tennis player
- September 18 – Nile Rodgers, African-American musician, songwriter, composer, and guitarist
- September 20 – Manuel Zelaya, President of Honduras
- September 21 – Anneliese Michel, German Roman Catholic believed possessed by demons (d. 1976)
- September 22 – Oliver Mtukudzi, Zimbabwean musician (d. 2019)
- September 23 – Kim Duk-soo, Korean musician
- September 25 – Christopher Reeve, American actor, activist (Superman) (d. 2004)
- September 26 – Predrag Miletić, Serbian actor
- September 27 – Didier Dubois, French mathematician
- September 28 – Sylvia Kristel, Dutch actress (d. 2012)
- September 30 – Jack Wild, English actor (H.R. Pufnstuf) (d. 2006)

=== October ===
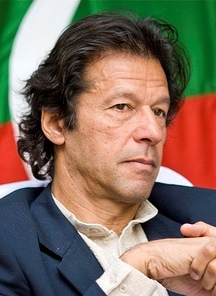
Imran Khan

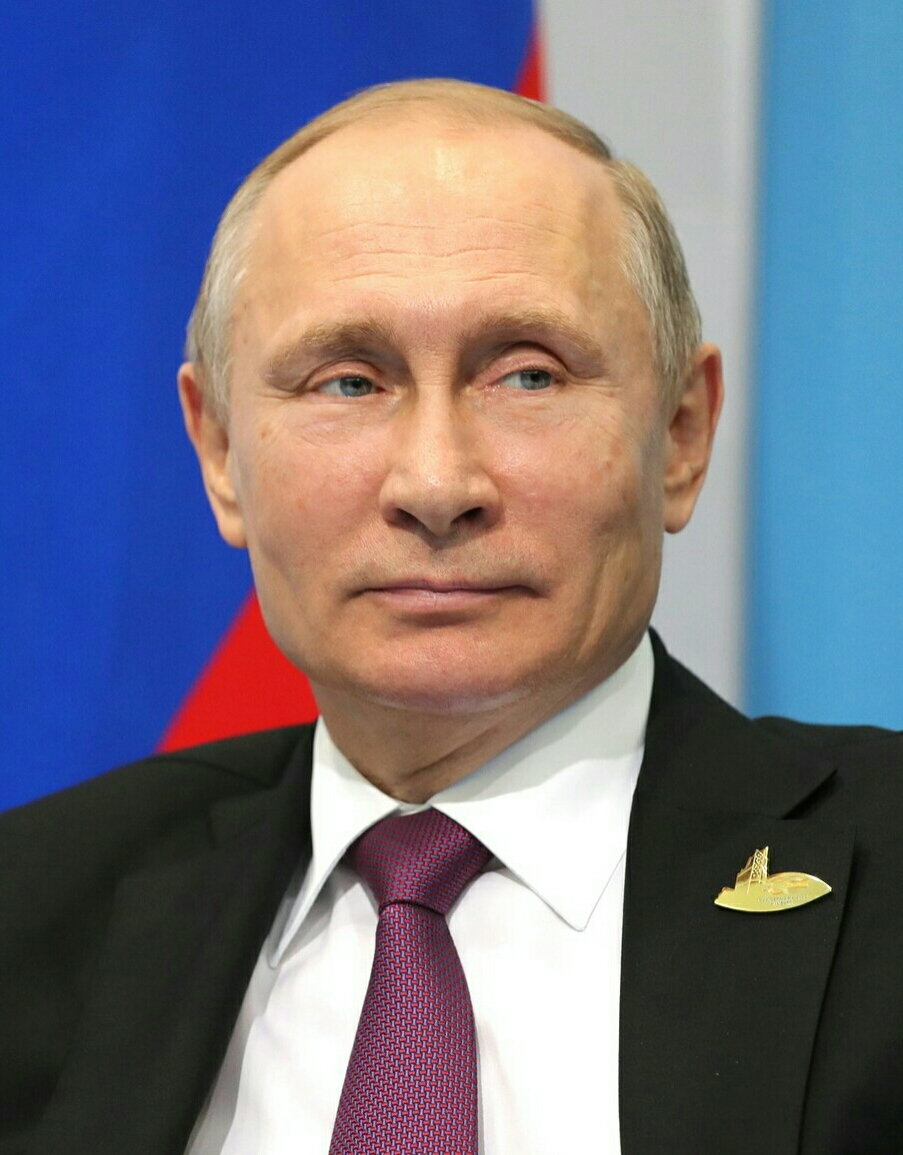
Vladimir Putin

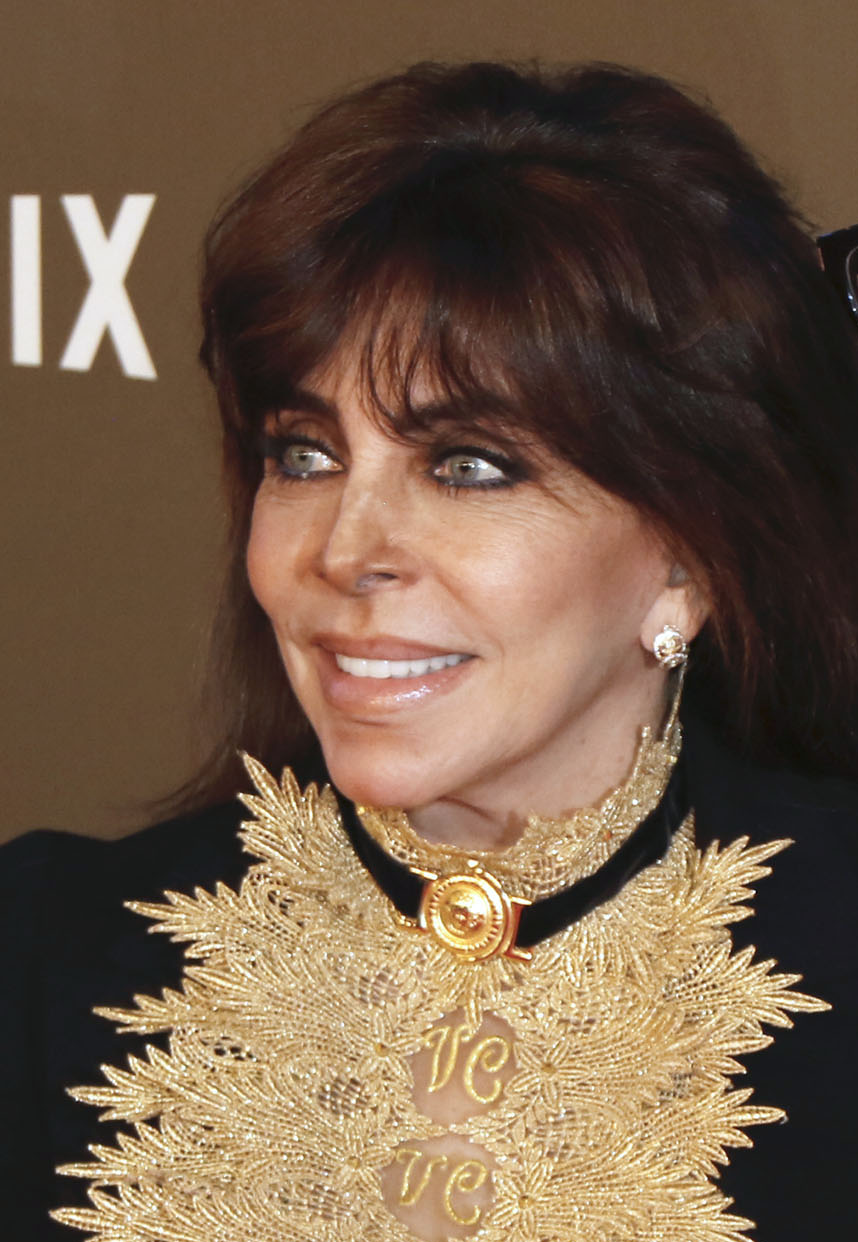
Verónica Castro

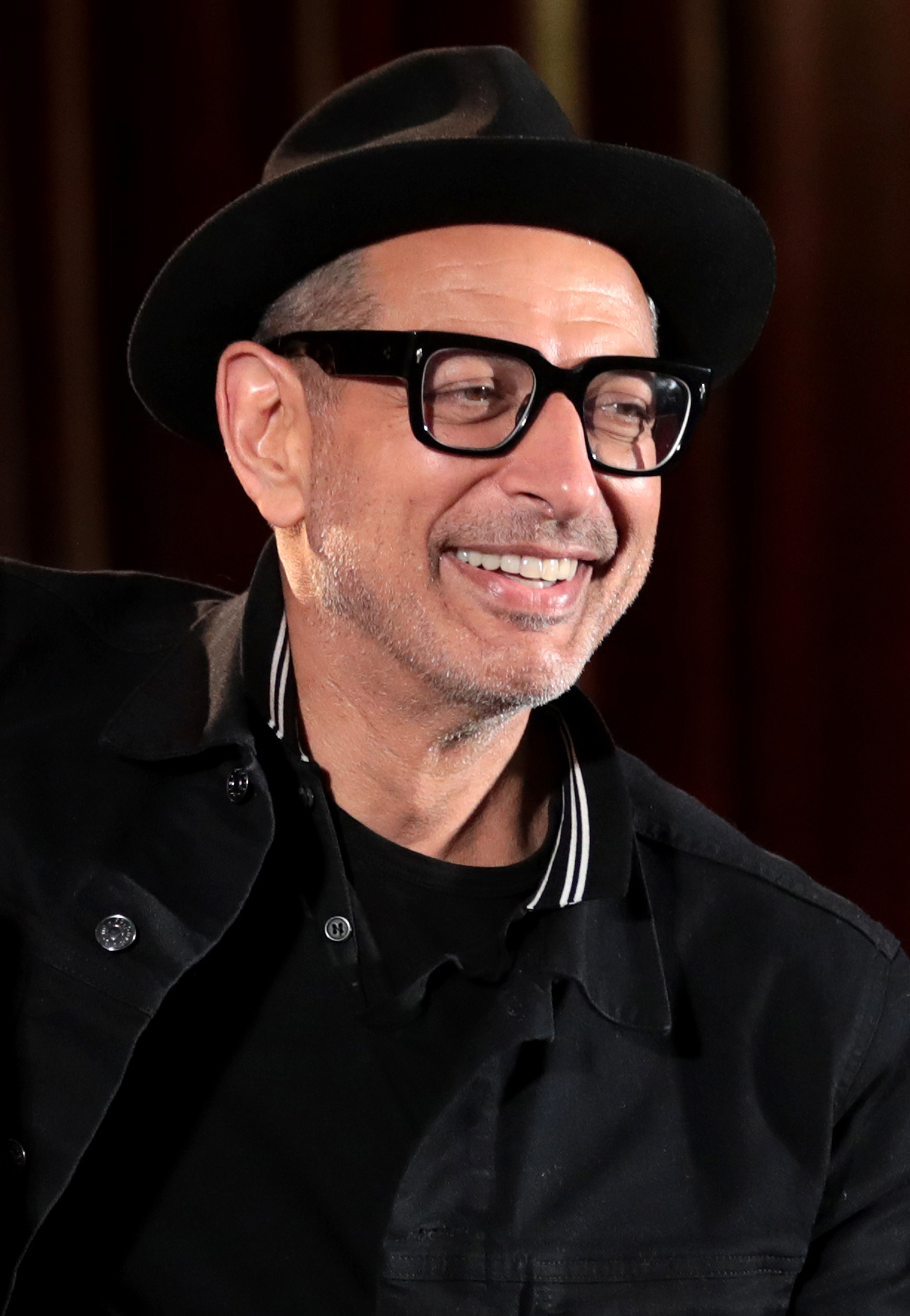
Jeff Goldblum

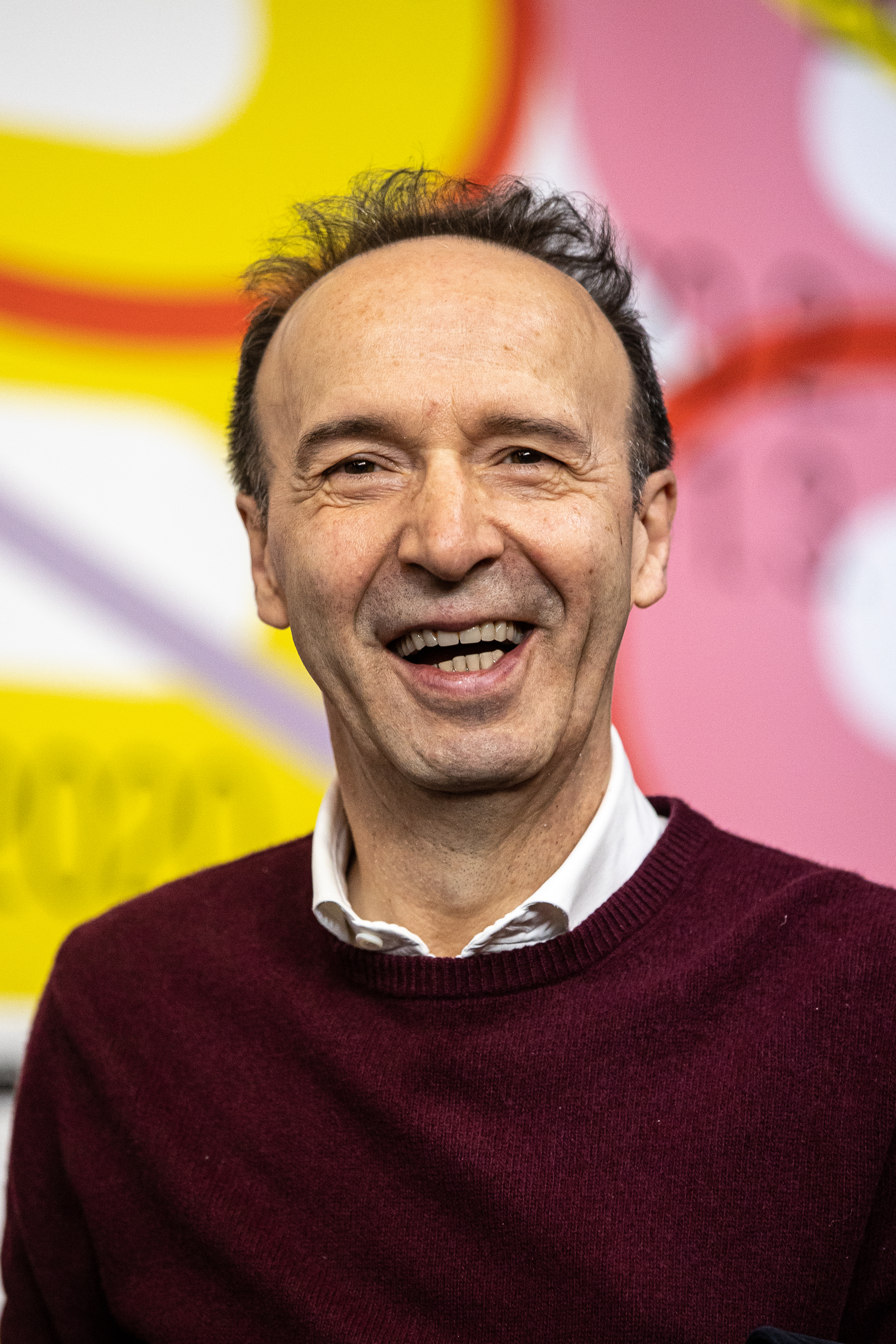
Roberto Benigni

- October 5
  - Clive Barker, British author
  - Harold Faltermeyer, German musician
  - Imran Khan, former Prime Minister of Pakistan and cricketer
  - Emomali Rahmon, President of Tajikistan
  - Duncan Regehr, Canadian actor
- October 6 – Matthew Sweeney, Irish poet (d. 2018)
- October 7
  - Ivo Gregurević, Croatian actor (d. 2019)
  - Mary Badham, American actress
  - Vladimir Putin, President of Russia
  - Ludmilla Tourischeva, Soviet gymnast
  - Ricky Phillips, American musician
- October 9
  - Sharon Osbourne, British actress, TV host and author
  - Dennis Stratton, British musician
- October 12 – Advent Bangun, Indonesian karateka, actor (d. 2018)
- October 13 – John Lone, Hong Kong actor
- October 14
  - Kaija Saariaho, Finnish composer (d. 2023)
  - Harry Anderson, American actor, comedian and magician (d. 2018)
  - Nikolai Andrianov, Soviet gymnast (d. 2011)
  - Rick Aviles, American actor and stand-up comedian (d. 1995)
- October 18 – Chuck Lorre, American television producer
- October 19 – Verónica Castro, Mexican actress, entertainer
- October 20 – Eliane Giardini, Brazilian actress
- October 22 – Jeff Goldblum, American actor
- October 23 – Steven Tandy, Australian stage, television and film actor
- October 24 – David Weber, American science-fiction, fantasy author
- October 26 – Andrew Motion, English poet
- October 27
  - Roberto Benigni, Italian actor, screenwriter, and film director
  - Hazell Dean, British pop, dance musician
  - Francis Fukuyama, American political scientist
  - Topi Sorsakoski, Finnish singer
- October 28 – Annie Potts, American actress

=== November ===
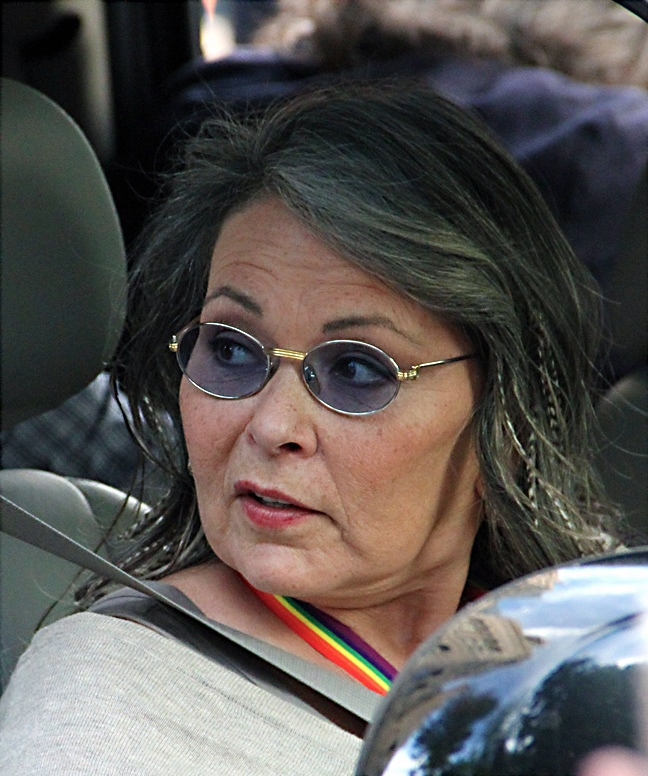
Roseanne Barr

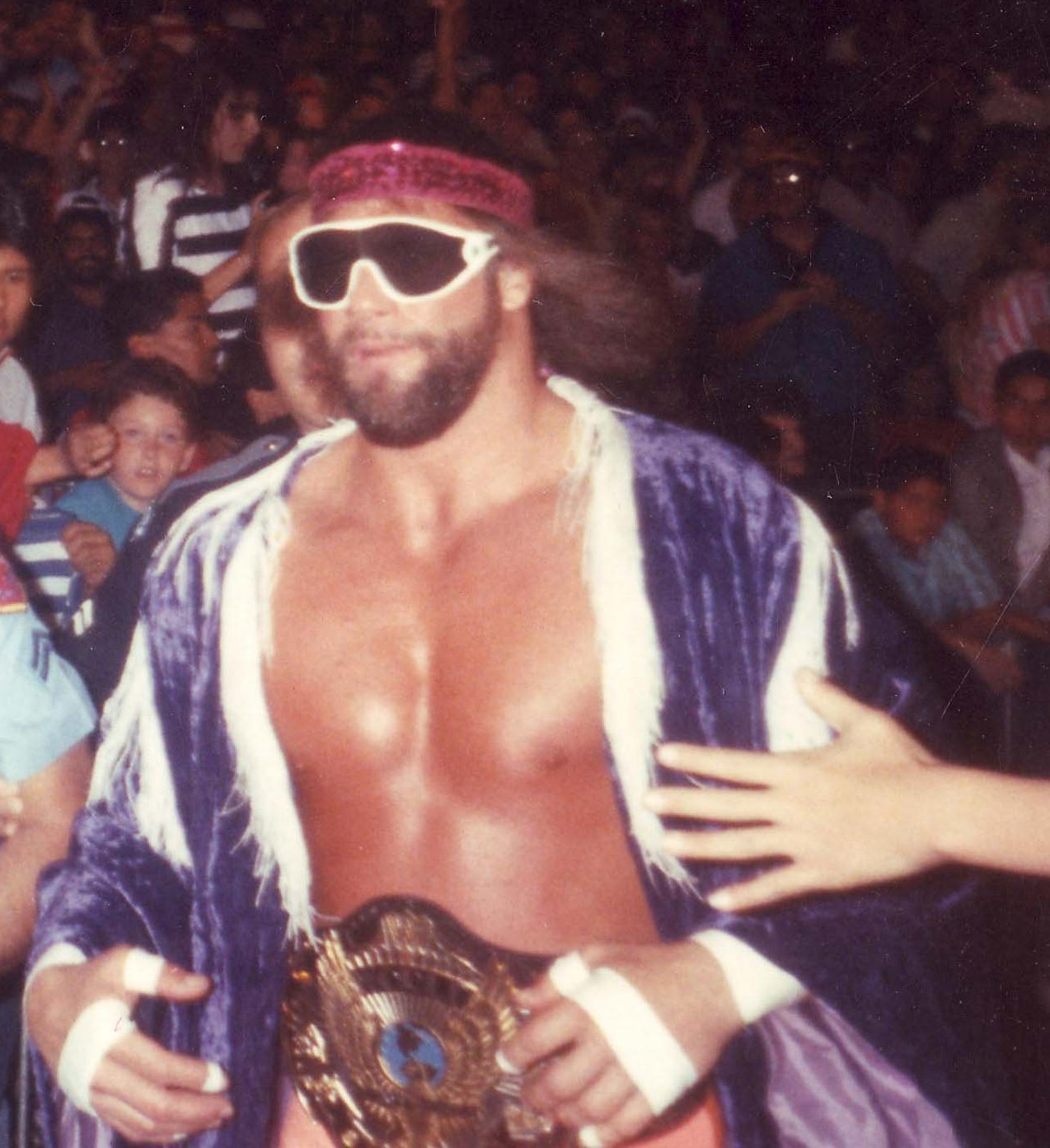
Randy Savage

- November 3
  - David Ho, Taiwanese-American AIDS researcher
  - Michael Shea, American child actor
  - Roseanne Barr, American actress, comedian (Roseanne)
  - Jim Cummings, American voice actor
- November 4 – Jeff Lorber, American jazz keyboardist, composer and record producer
- November 5
  - Abdul Razzaq Anjum, Pakistani Air Vice Marshal (d. 2003)
  - Oleh Blokhin, Ukrainian football player and manager
  - Brian Muehl, American puppeteer
  - Bill Walton, American basketball player, commentator (d. 2024)
- November 6 – Michael Cunningham, American writer
- November 7
  - Geraldo Alckmin, Brazilian politician
  - David Petraeus, American general
- November 8
  - Jan Raas, Dutch professional cyclist
  - Alfre Woodard, African-American actress, producer and political activist
- November 9 – Gladys Requena, Venezuelan politician
- November 11 — Sue Schechter, American politician, member of the Texas House of Representatives
- November 13 – Art Malik, Pakistani-born British actor
- November 14 – Maggie Roswell, American actress
- November 15 – Randy Savage, American professional wrestler (d. 2011)
- November 16 – Shigeru Miyamoto, Japanese game designer
- November 17
  - Ties Kruize, Dutch field hockey player
  - Cyril Ramaphosa, President of South Africa
- November 18
  - Delroy Lindo, British actor
  - John Parr, English singer, songwriter and guitarist
  - León Zuleta, Colombian LGBT activist and writer
- November 23 – Sharon O'Neill, New Zealand singer-songwriter and pianist
- November 24 – Ilja Richter, German actor, voice actor, television presenter, singer and author
- November 28 – S. Epatha Merkerson, African-American actress (Law and Order)
- November 29 – John D. Barrow, English cosmologist, theoretical physicist and mathematician (d. 2020)
- November 30 – Mandy Patinkin, American actor and singer

=== December ===
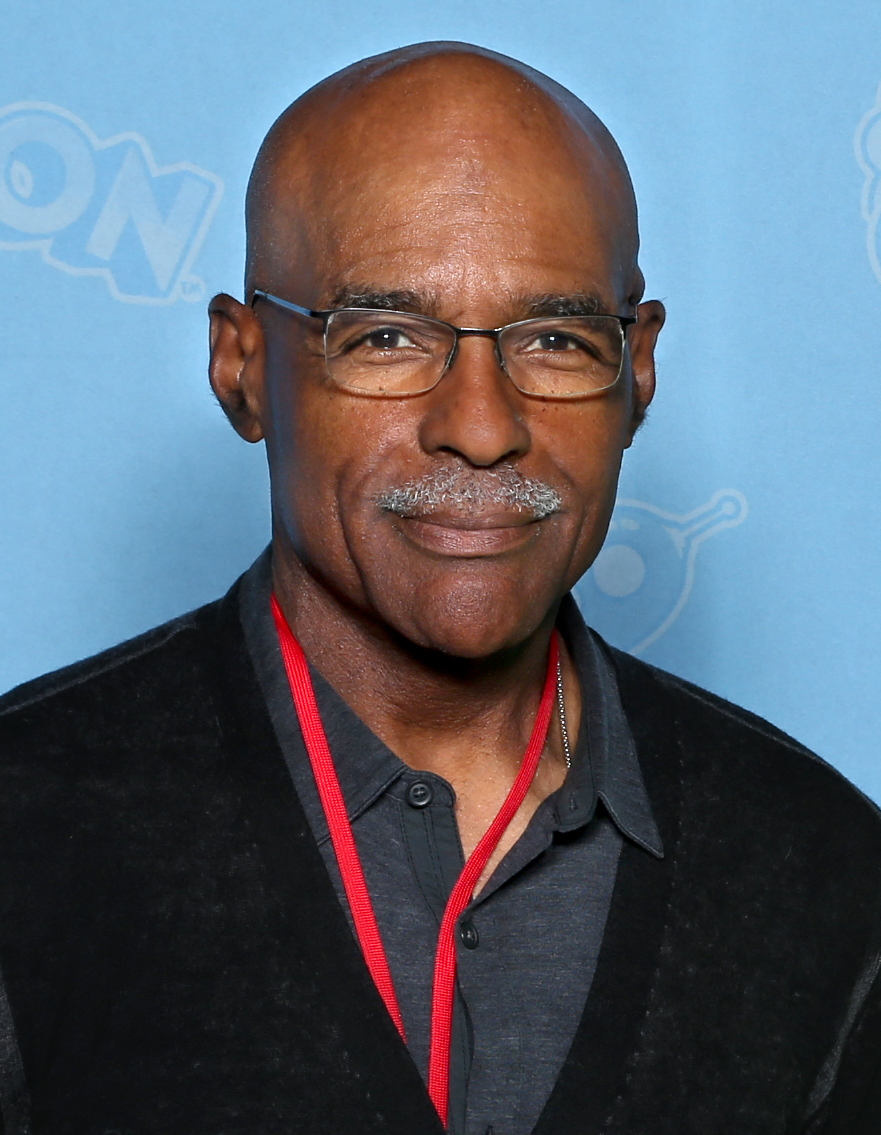
Michael Dorn

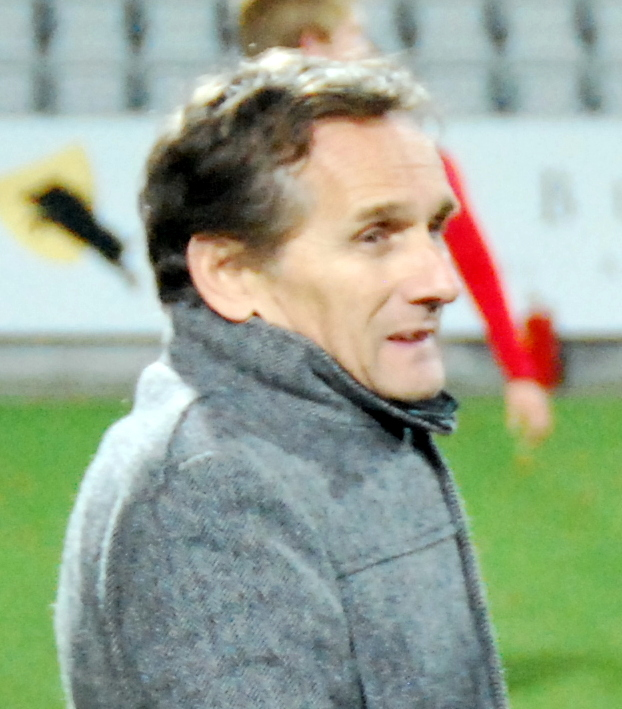
Allan Simonsen

- December 1
  - Rick Scott, American politician, 45th Governor of Florida, U.S. Senator (Florida)
  - Pegi Young, American singer, songwriter, educator, and philanthropist (d. 2019)
- December 3
  - Bruno Jonas, German Kabarett artist, actor
  - Mel Smith, British comedian (d. 2013)
  - Wan Azizah Wan Ismail, Malaysian politician
- December 6
  - Nicolas Bréhal, French novelist, literary critic
  - Edward Etzel, American Olympic shooter
  - Christian Kulik, Polish football player
- December 7 – Susan Collins, American politician, Senator for Maine
- December 8 – Khaw Boon Wan, Singaporean politician
- December 9 – Michael Dorn, African-American actor (Star Trek: The Next Generation)
- December 12
  - Harbance Singh (Herb) Dhaliwal, Canadian politician
  - Sarah Douglas, English actress
- December 15
  - Julie Taymor, American film, stage and opera director, costume designer
  - Hwang Woo-suk, South Korean biomedical scientist
  - Allan Simonsen, Danish footballer and coach
- December 16 – Joel Garner, West Indian cricketer
- December 20
  - Jenny Agutter, English actress
  - Faisal Al-Fayez, Prime Minister of Jordan
  - Ray Bumatai, American actor, musician, singer and recording artist (d. 2005)
- December 25 – Youssouf Ouédraogo, 6th Prime Minister of Burkina Faso (d. 2017)
- December 26 – Riki Sorsa, Finnish singer (d. 2016)
- December 27
  - David Knopfler, British musician
  - Tovah Feldshuh, American actress
- December 28 – Arun Jaitley, Indian politician (d. 2019)
- December 29 – Külliki Saldre, Estonian actress
- December 30 – June Anderson, American soprano

== Deaths ==
=== January ===
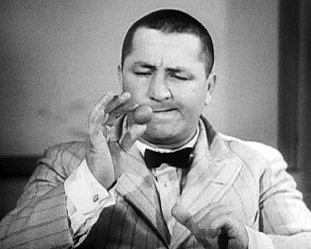
Curly Howard

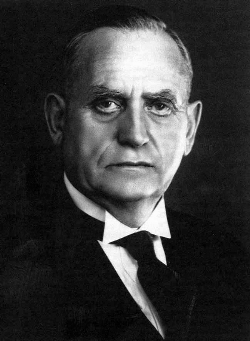
Sveinn Björnsson

- January 1 – Henri Albert Hartmann, French surgeon (b. 1860)
- January 4 – Constant Permeke, Belgian painter (b. 1886)
- January 5 – Hristo Tatarchev, Bulgarian revolutionary (b. 1869)
- January 8 – Antonia Maury, American astronomer (b. 1866)
- January 11 – Jean de Lattre de Tassigny, French general, posthumous Marshal of France (b. 1889)
- January 18 – Curly Howard, American actor and comedian (The Three Stooges) (b. 1903)
- January 19 – Archduke Maximilian Eugen of Austria (b. 1895)
- January 25
  - Sveinn Björnsson, 1st President of Iceland (b. 1881)
  - François Gagnepain, French botanist (b. 1866)
  - Polly Moran, American actress (b. 1883)
- January 26 – Khorloogiin Choibalsan, Prime Minister of the Mongolian People's Republic (b. 1895)
- January 27 – Fannie Ward, American actress (b. 1872)
- January 28
  - Thomas Hicks, American runner (b. 1876)
  - Nicolae Constantin Batzaria, Ottoman statesman, Romanian writer (b. 1874)

=== February ===
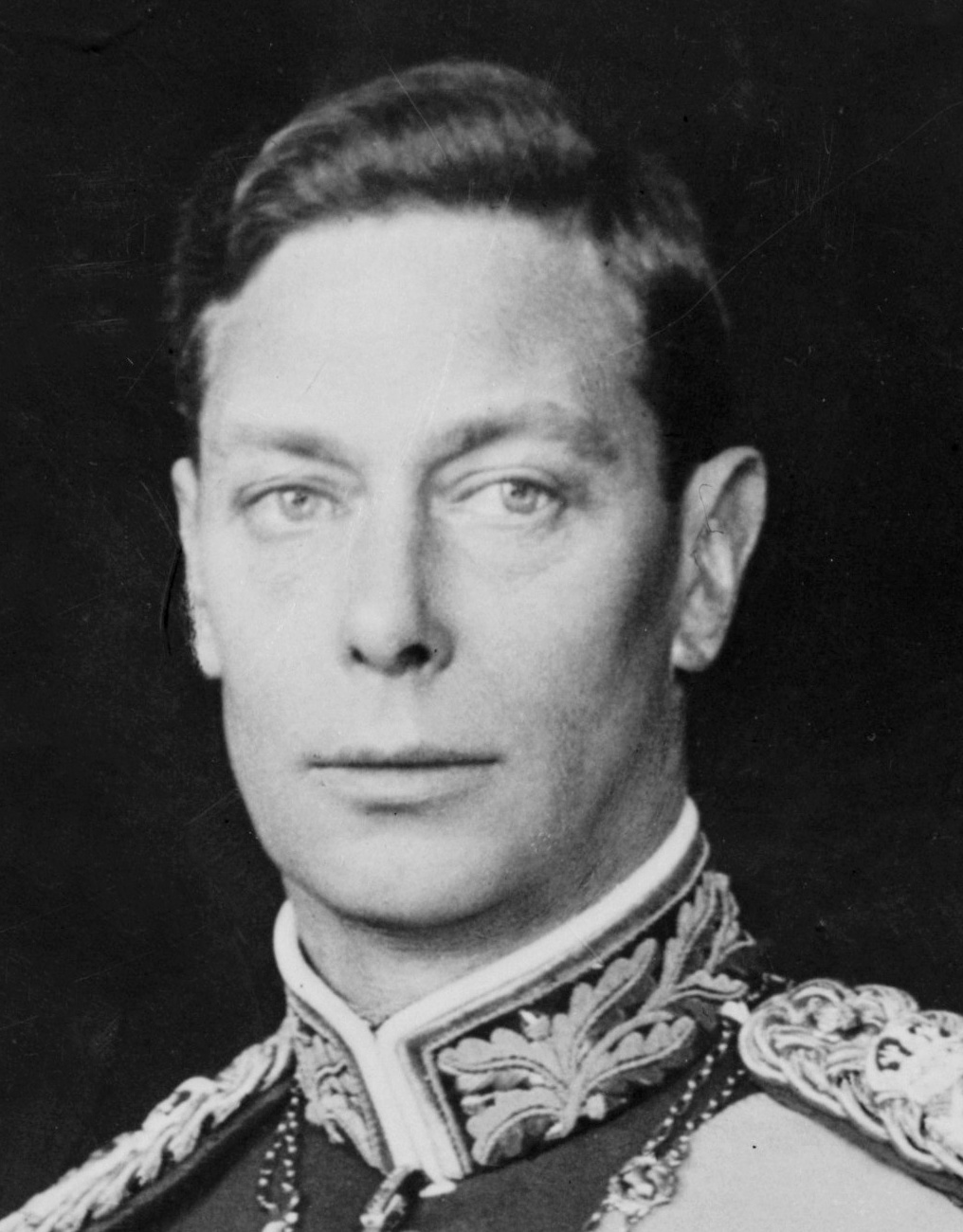
King George VI

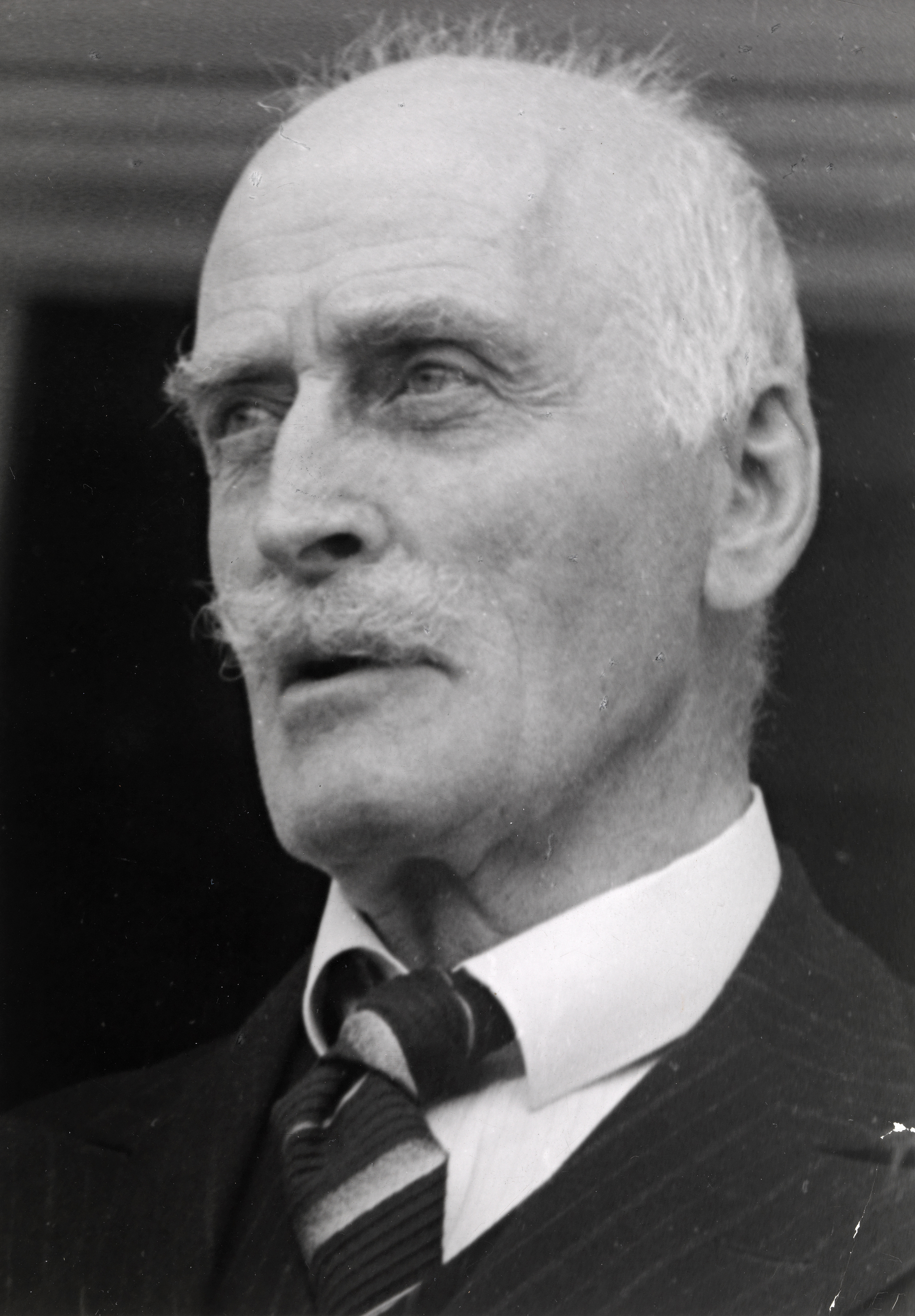
Knut Hamsun

- February 2 – Charles de Rochefort, French actor (b. 1879)
- February 3 – Harold L. Ickes, United States Secretary of the Interior (b. 1874)
- February 6 – King George VI of the United Kingdom (b. 1895)
- February 7 – Philip G. Epstein, American screenwriter (b. 1909)
- February 11 – Matija Murko, Yugoslav scholar (b. 1861)
- February 14 – Molly Malone, American actress (b. 1888)
- February 17 – Edvige Carboni, Italian Roman Catholic laywoman, mystic and venerable (b. 1880)
- February 18 – Enrique Jardiel Poncela, Spanish playwright and novelist (b. 1901)
- February 19
  - Lawrence Grant, British actor (b. 1870)
  - Knut Hamsun, Norwegian author, Nobel Prize laureate (b. 1859)
- February 20 – Carlos Julio Arosemena Tola, 28th President of Ecuador (b. 1888)
- February 21 – Francis Xavier Ford, American Roman Catholic bishop, missionary, servant of God and reverend (b. 1892)
- February 26
  - Theodoros Pangalos, Greek general and politician, dictator and President of Greece (b. 1878)
  - Josef Thorak, Austrian-born German sculptor (b. 1889)
- February 28 – Albert Forster, Gauleiter of Danzig during WW2 executed for war crimes (b. 1902)

=== March ===
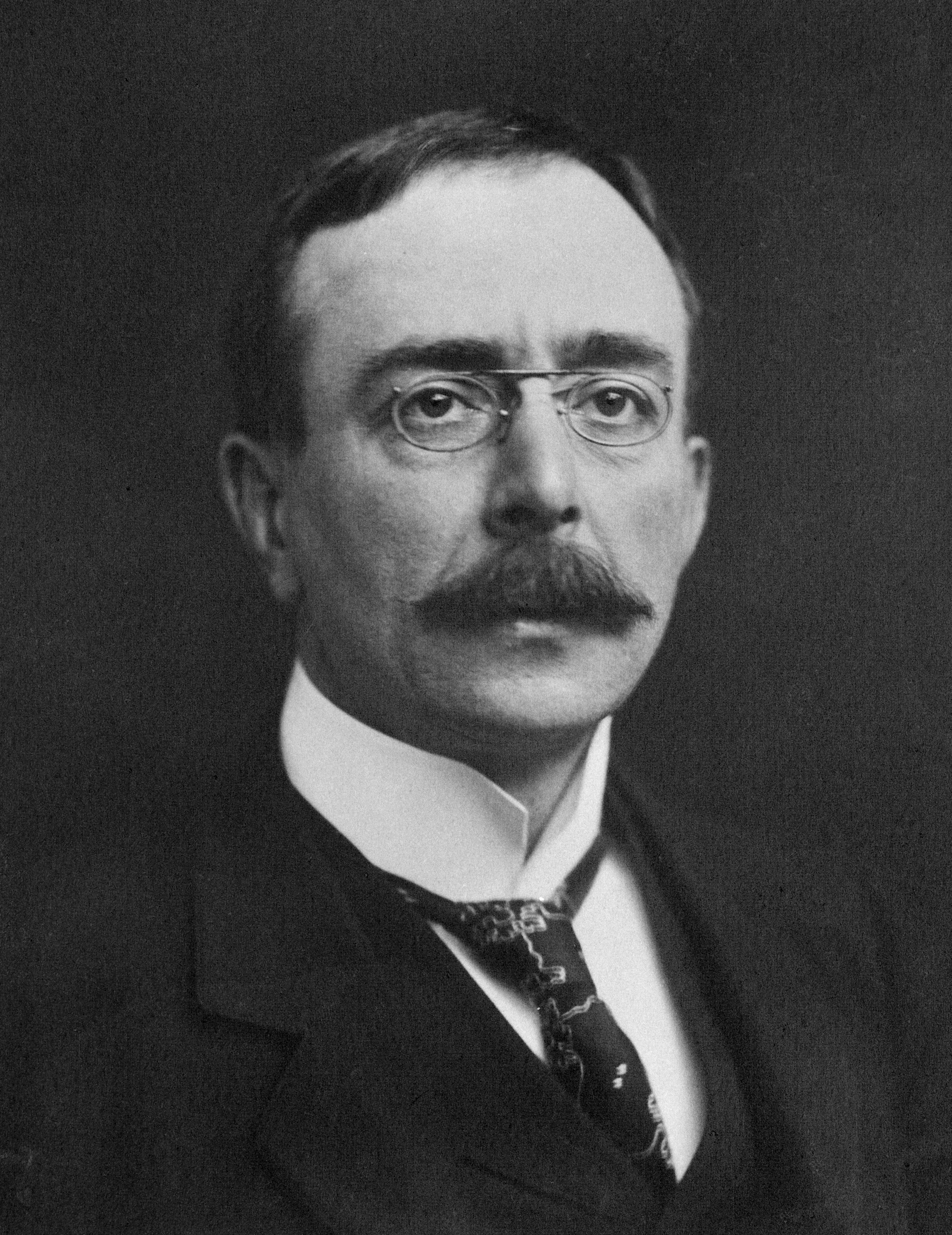
Charles Scott Sherrington

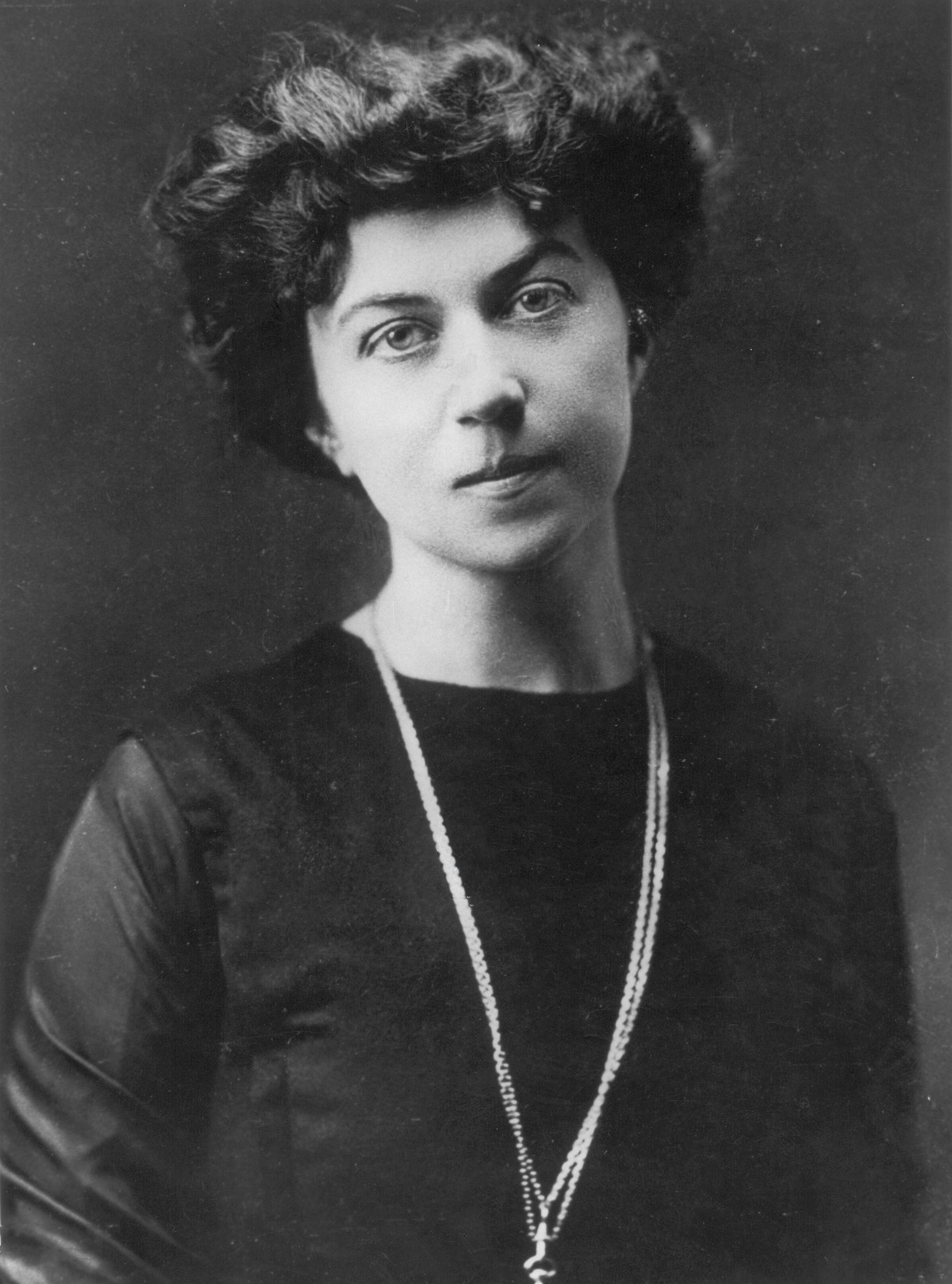
Alexandra Kollontai

- March 1
  - Masao Kume, Japanese playwright, novelist and poet (b. 1891)
  - Gregory La Cava, American film director (b. 1892)
- March 5 – Sir Charles Sherrington, British physiologist, Nobel Prize laureate (b. 1857)
- March 7 – Paramahansa Yogananda, Indian guru (b. 1893)
- March 9 – Alexandra Kollontai, Russian revolutionary (b. 1872)
- March 12 – Hugh Herbert, American actor and comedian (b. 1885)
- March 13 – Võ Thị Sáu, Vietnamese schoolgirl (b. 1933)
- March 19 – Robert Guérin, French administrator, 1st President of FIFA (b. 1876)
- March 21 – Andries Jan Pieters, Dutch criminal (b. 1916)
- March 22 – D. S. Senanayake, 1st Prime Minister of Ceylon (b. 1884)
- March 26 – J.P. McGowan, Australian actor and director (b. 1880)
- March 30 – Sir Jigme Wangchuck, King of Bhutan (b. 1905)
- March 31
  - Walter Schellenberg, German Nazi intelligence official (b. 1910)
  - Roland West, American film director (b. 1885)
  - Wallace H. White, Jr., American politician (b. 1877)

=== April ===
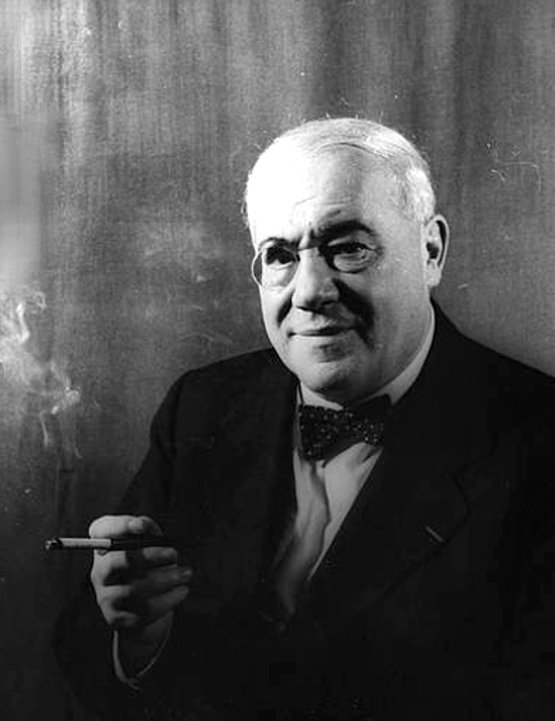
Ferenc Molnár

- April 1 – Ferenc Molnár, Hungarian novelist and dramatist (b. 1878)
- April 2 – Julio Enrique Moreno, acting President of Ecuador (b. 1879)
- April 3 – Miina Sillanpää, Finnish politician (b. 1866)
- April 5 – Charles Collett, British chief mechanical engineer (Great Western Railway) (b. 1871)
- April 8 – Tadeusz Estreicher, Polish cryogenics pioneer (b. 1871)
- April 15 – Viktor Chernov, Russian revolutionary, leader of the Russian Socialist Revolutionary Party (b. 1873)
- April 21
  - Leslie Banks, British actor (b. 1890)
  - Sir Stafford Cripps, British Labour politician, former Chancellor of the Exchequer (b. 1889)
- April 27 – Guido Castelnuovo, Italian mathematician (b. 1865)
- April 29 – Manuel Portela Valladares, Spanish political figure (b. 1868)

=== May ===
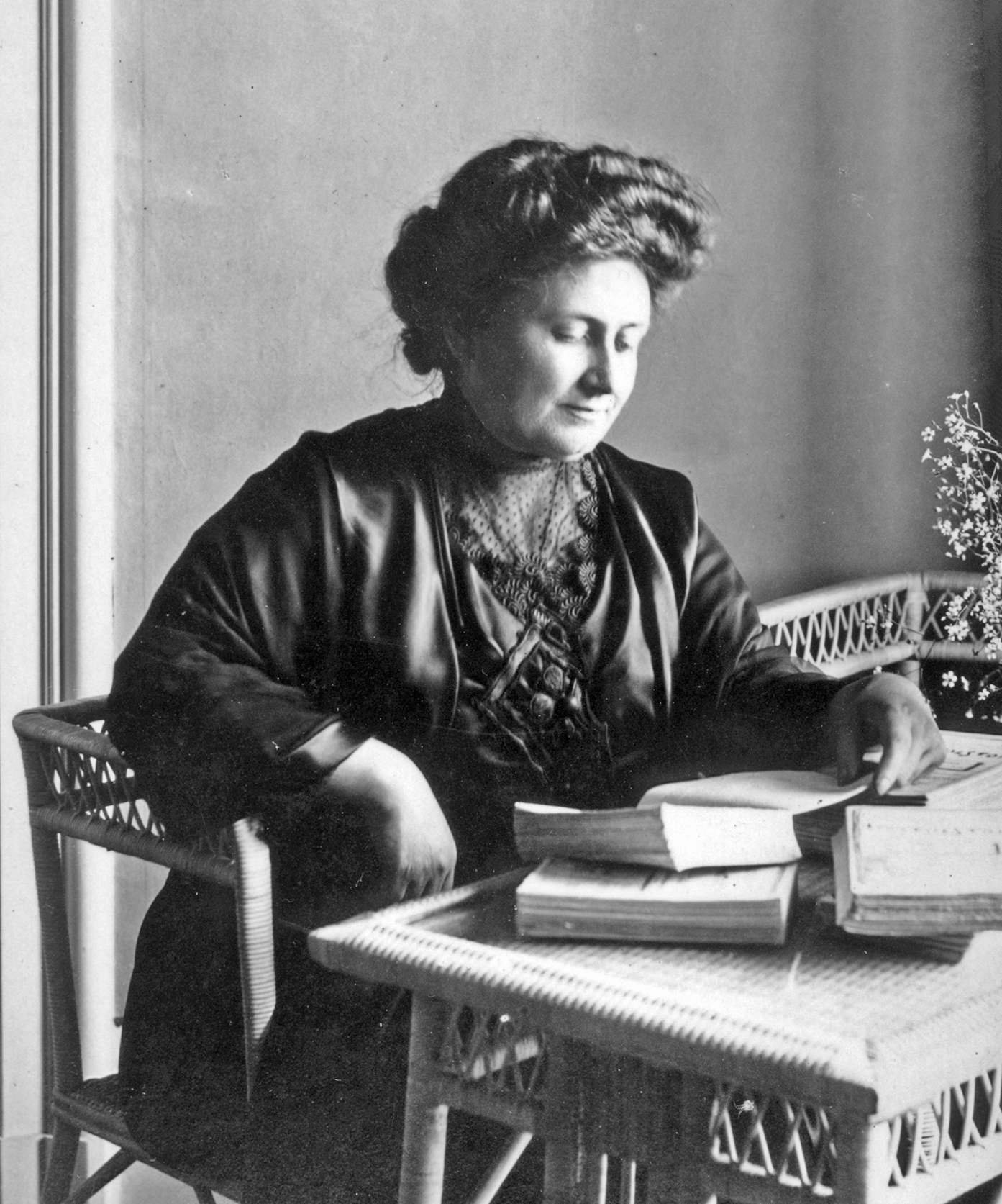
Maria Montessori

- May 2 – Matrona Nikonova, Soviet Orthodox nun and saint (b. 1881)
- May 5 – Alberto Savinio, Italian writer (b. 1891)
- May 6 – Maria Montessori, Italian educator (b. 1870)
- May 7 – Juan Bautista Pérez, Venezuelan lawyer, magistrate and politician, 43rd President of Venezuela (b. 1869)
- May 8 – William Fox, Austro-Hungarian-born film producer (b. 1879)
- May 9 – Canada Lee, American actor and boxer (b. 1907)
- May 10 – Clark L. Hull, American psychologist (b. 1884)
- May 11 – Giovanni Tebaldini, Italian composer (b. 1864)
- May 15
  - Albert Bassermann, German actor (b. 1867)
  - Italo Montemezzi, Italian composer (b. 1875)
- May 21 – John Garfield, American actor (b. 1913)
- May 23 – Georg Schumann, German composer (b. 1866)

=== June ===
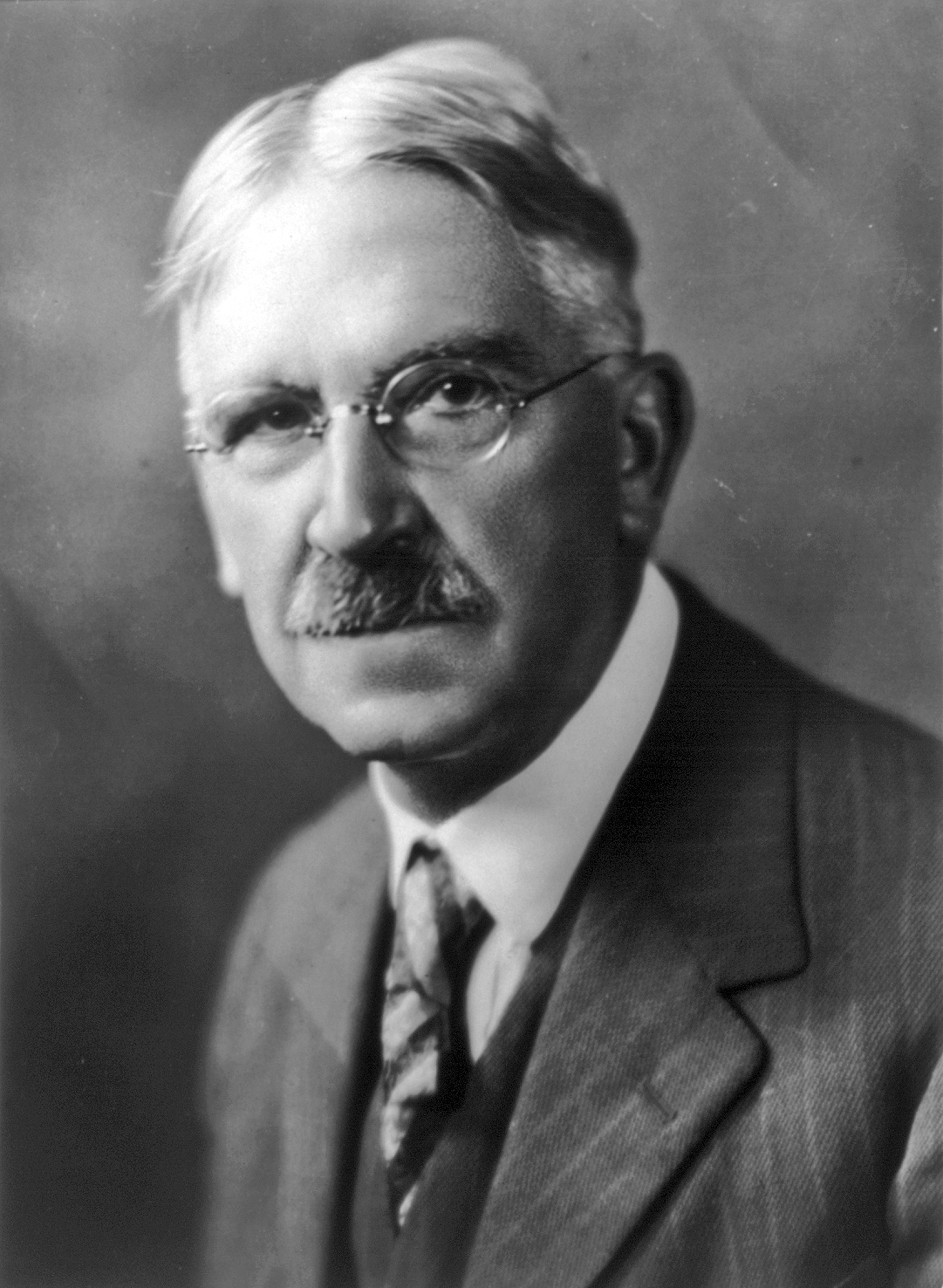
John Dewey

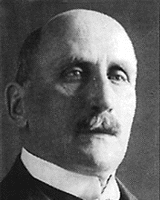
Felix Calonder

- June 1
  - John Dewey, American philosopher (b. 1859)
  - Malcolm St. Clair, American filmmaker (b. 1897)
- June 8 – Sergey Merkurov, Soviet sculptor (b. 1881)
- June 9 – Luigi Puccianti, Italian physicist (b. 1875)
- June 10
  - Hilda Hongell, Finnish architect (b. 1867)
  - Frances Theodora Parsons, American naturalist (b. 1861)
- June 12 – Michael von Faulhaber, German Cardinal Archbishop of Munich (b. 1869)
- June 13 – Emma Eames, American soprano (b. 1865)
- June 14 – Felix Calonder, Swiss politician, 36th President of the Swiss Confederation (b. 1863)
- June 15 – Krystyna Skarbek (aka Christine Granville), Polish-born British SOE operative during World War II (b. 1908)
- June 17 – Jack Parsons, American rocket engineer (b. 1914)
- June 21 – Wop May, Canadian World War I pilot (d. 1896)
- June 24 – Sir George Pearce, Australian politician (b. 1870)
- June 26 – Theodor Becker, German actor (b. 1880)
- June 27 – Elmo Lincoln, American actor (b. 1889)
- June 30 – Eugenio de Liguoro, Italian actor and director (b. 1899)

=== July ===
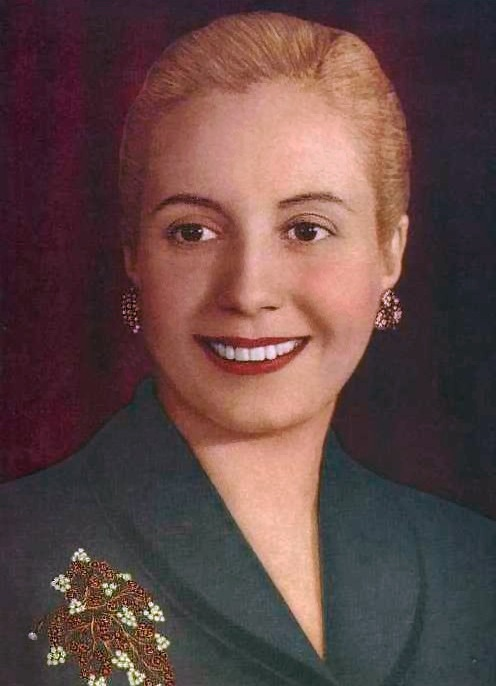
Eva Perón

- July 3 – Carl Tanzler, German-born radiology technologist (b. 1877)
- July 4 – Walter Long, American actor (b. 1879)
- July 5 – Alison Skipworth, British actress (b. 1863)
- July 10 – Rued Langgaard, Danish composer and organist (b. 1893)
- July 21 – Pedro Lascuráin, Mexican diplomat, 34th President of Mexico (b. 1856)
- July 26
  - Edward Ellis, American actor (b. 1870)
  - Eva Perón, Argentine political leader, and First Lady to and partner in power of President Juan Perón (b. 1919)
- July 31 – Waldemar Bonsels, German writer (b. 1880)

=== August ===
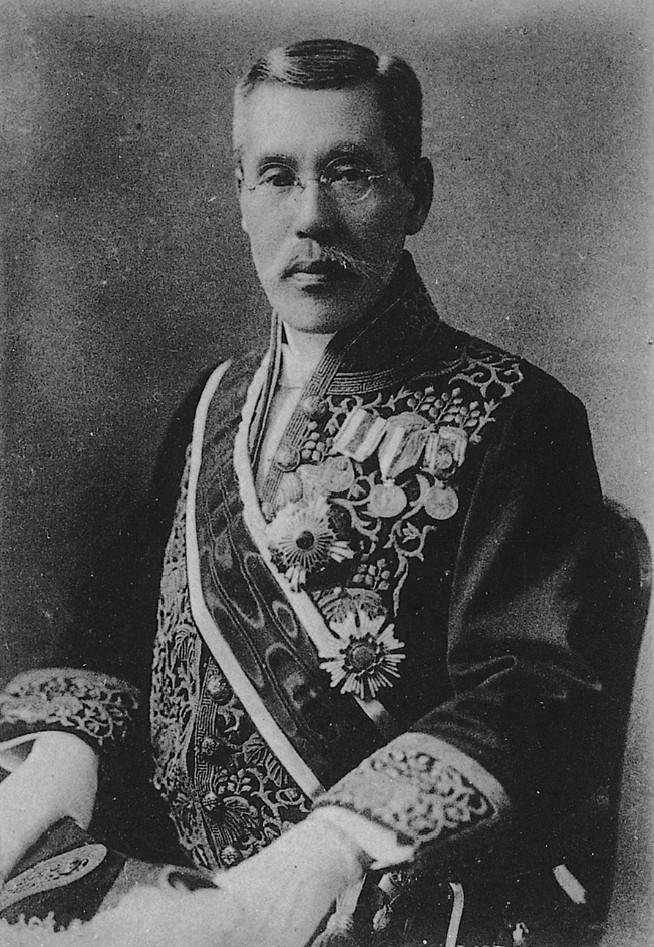
Hiranuma Kiichirō

- August 2 – J. Farrell MacDonald, American actor (b. 1875)
- August 6 – Francis Pegahmagabow, Canadian military officer (b. 1889)
- August 12 – Peretz Markish, Soviet-born Israeli poet (b. 1895)
- August 15 – Sameera Moussa, Egyptian nuclear scientist (b. 1917)
- August 18
  - Alberto Hurtado, Chilean Jesuit priest and saint (b. 1901)
  - Ralph Byrd, American actor (b. 1909)
- August 22 – Hiranuma Kiichirō, Japanese politician, 24th Prime Minister of Japan (b. 1867)
- August 29 – Euphrasia Eluvathingal, Indian Carmelite nun and saint (b. 1877)

=== September ===
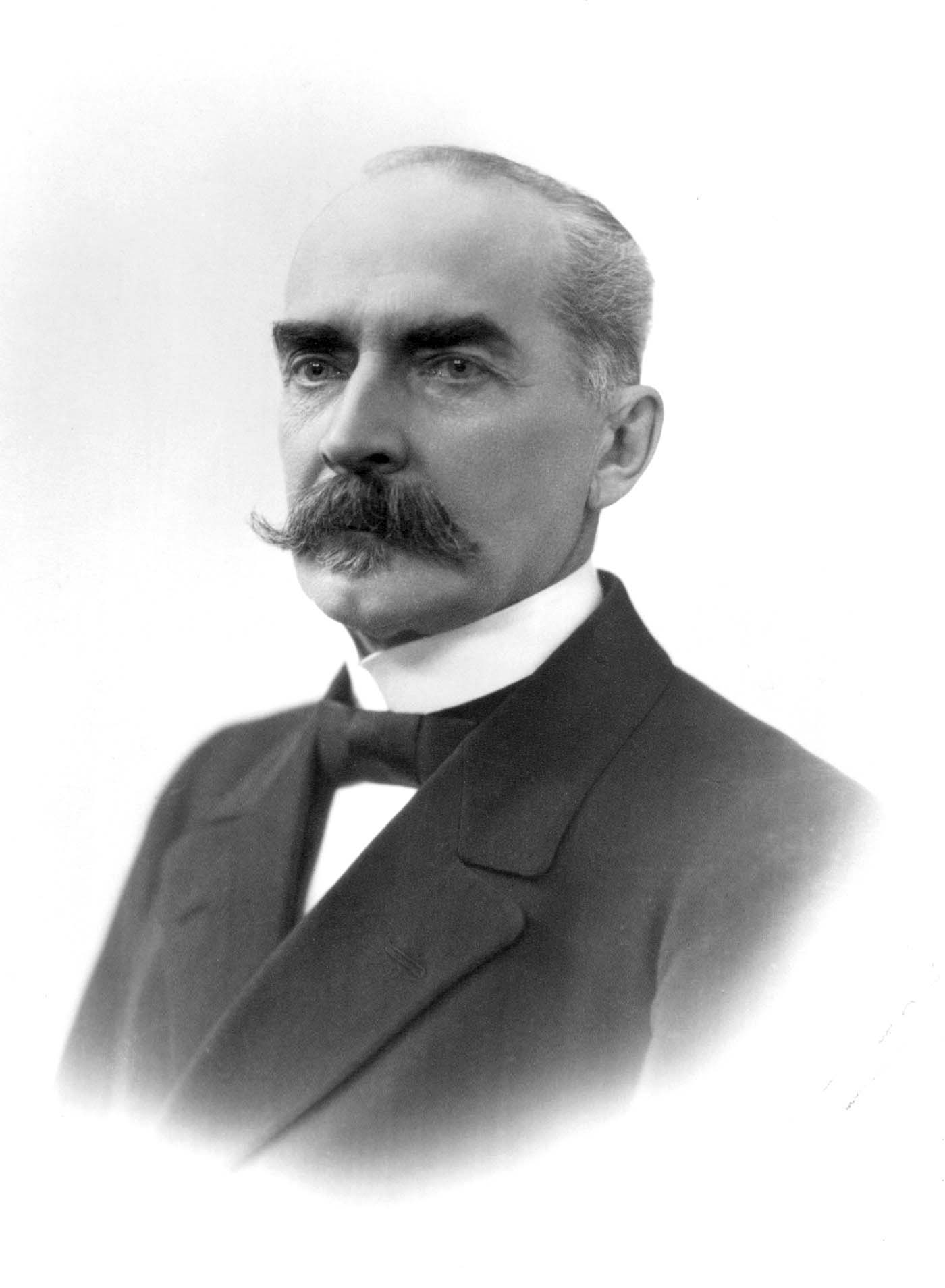
Kaarlo Juho Ståhlberg

- September 6
  - José Vicente de Freitas, Portuguese military officer and politician, 98th Prime Minister of Portugal (b. 1869)
  - Gertrude Lawrence, English actress (b. 1898)
- September 9 – Jonas H. Ingram, American admiral (b. 1886)
- September 16 – Hugo Raudsepp, Estonian playwright (b. 1883)
- September 22 – Kaarlo Juho Ståhlberg, Finnish jurist and academic, 1st President of Finland (b. 1865)
- September 26 – George Santayana, Spanish writer (b. 1863)
- September 30 – Waldorf Astor, 2nd Viscount Astor, American businessman and politician (b. 1879)

=== October ===
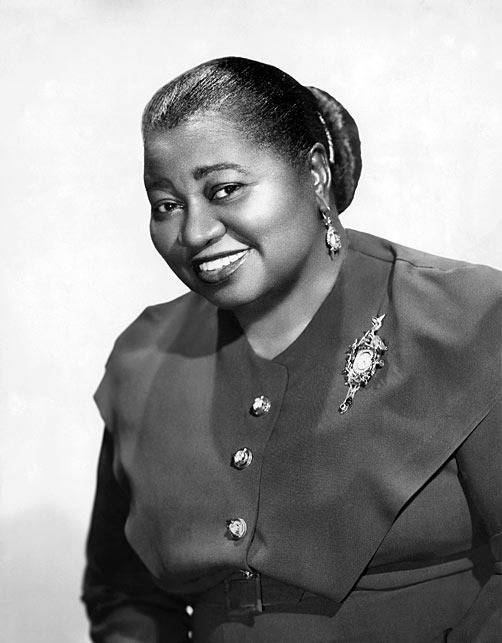
Hattie McDaniel

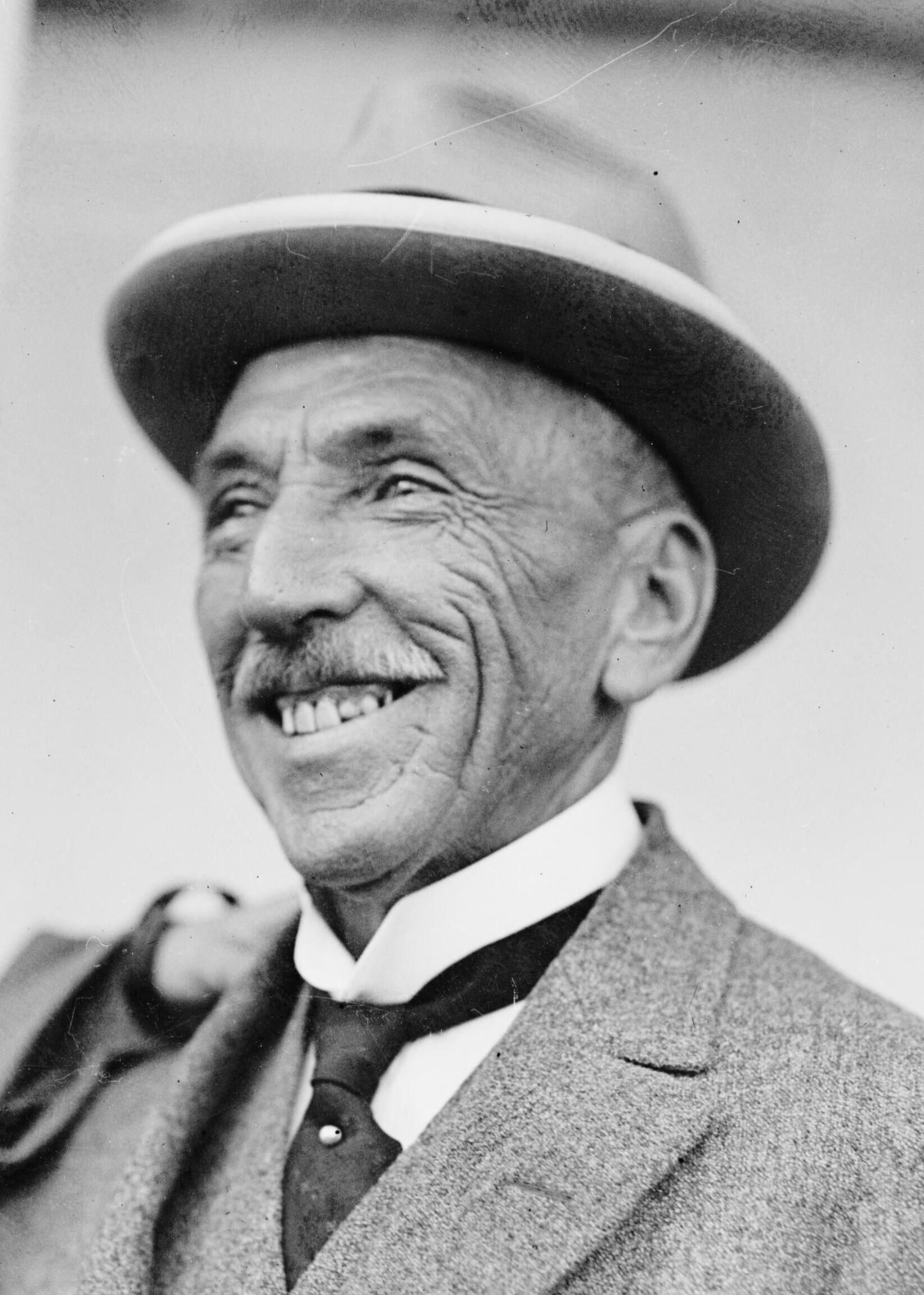
Billy Hughes

- October 4
  - Sir Keith Murdoch, Australian journalist (b. 1885)
  - Sylvia Beach, American publisher (b. 1887)
- October 8 – Arturo Rawson, Argentine military officer and politician, 26th President of Argentina (b. 1885)
- October 11 – Jack Conway, American film producer and director (b. 1886)
- October 19
  - Edward S. Curtis, American photographer, ethnologist, and film director (b. 1868)
  - Ernst Streeruwitz, Austrian businessman and politician, 6th Chancellor of Austria (b. 1874)
- October 20 – Basil Radford, British actor (b. 1897)
- October 21 – Juan Yagüe, Spanish general (b. 1891)
- October 22 – Ernst Rüdin, Swiss psychiatrist, geneticist, and eugenicist (b. 1874)
- October 23 – Susan Peters, American actress (b. 1921)
- October 25 – Sergei Bortkiewicz, Soviet Romantic composer and pianist (b. 1877)
- October 26
  - Hattie McDaniel, American actress (b. 1893)
  - Myrtle McAteer, American tennis player (b. 1878)
- October 28 – Billy Hughes, Australian politician, 7th Prime Minister of Australia (b. 1862)

=== November ===
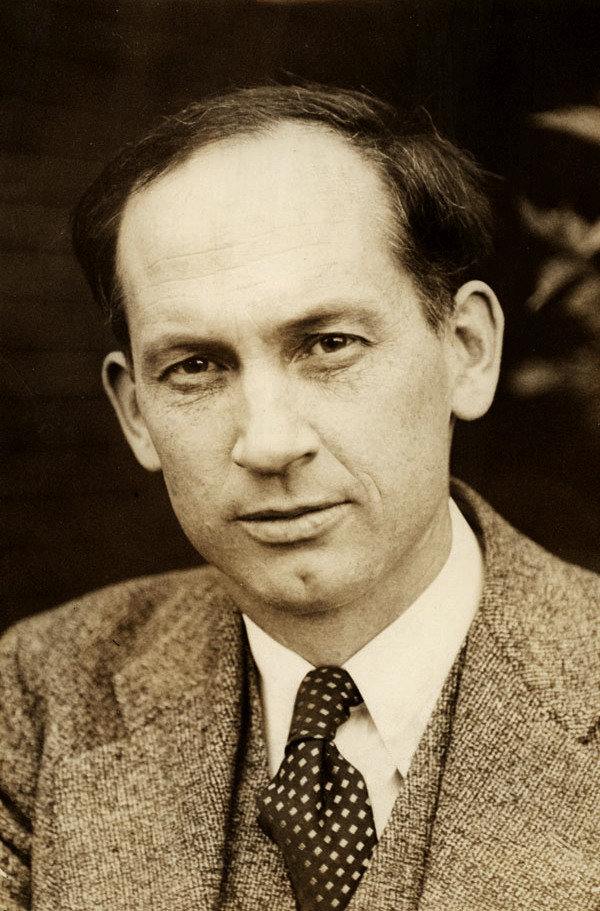
Harold Innis

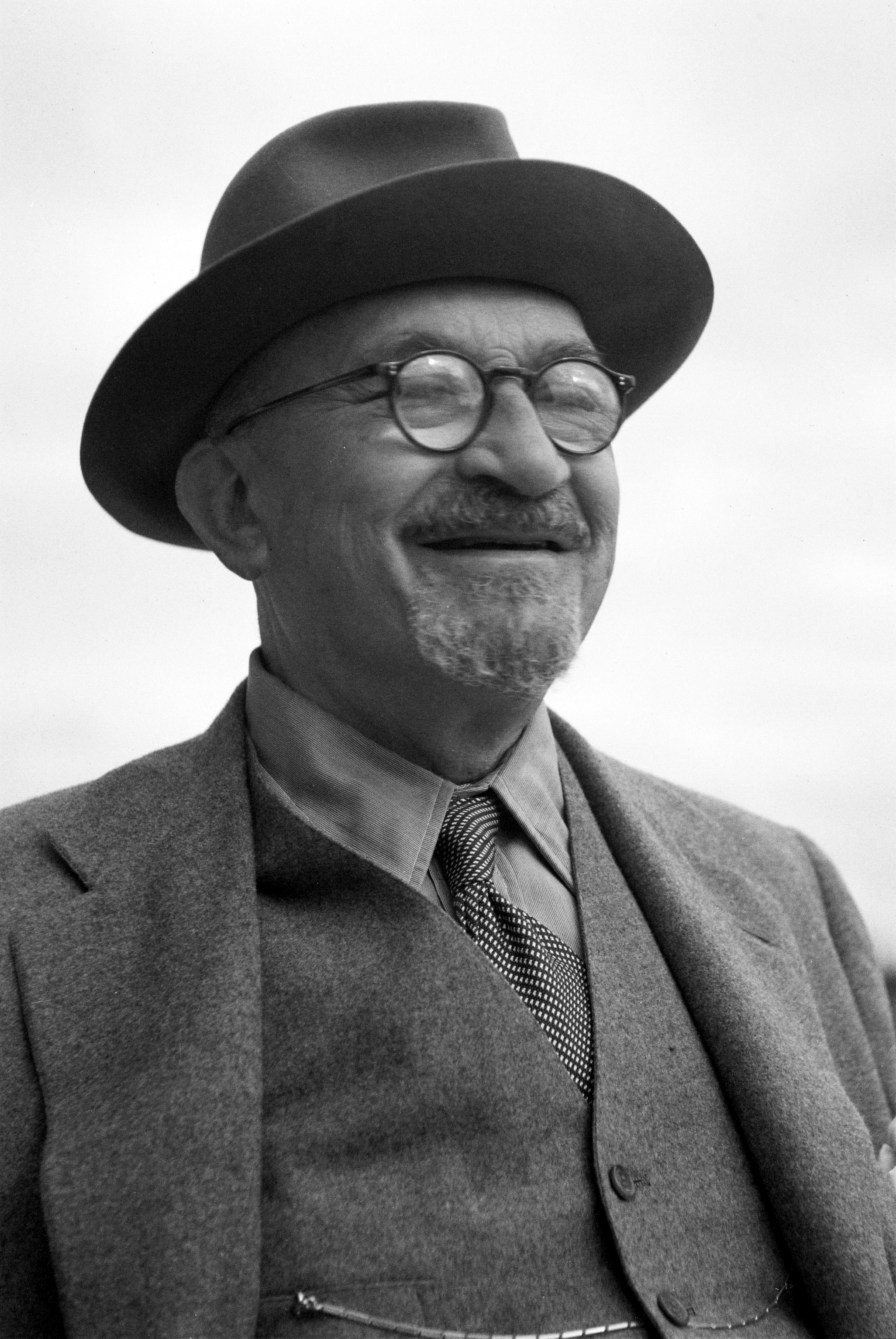
Chaim Weizmann

- November 1 – Dixie Lee, American singer (b. 1909)
- November 2
  - Mehmet Esat Bülkat, Ottoman general (b. 1862)
  - Henry Edwards, British actor (b. 1882)
- November 3 – Louis Verneuil, French playwright and screenwriter (b. 1893)
- November 8 – Harold Innis, Canadian communications scholar (b. 1894)
- November 9 – Chaim Weizmann, Jewish biochemist, Zionist leader and Israeli statesman, 1st President of Israel (b. 1874)
- November 15
  - Vasyl Krychevsky, Ukrainian painter (b. 1873)
  - Vincent Scotto, French composer (b. 1874)
- November 18 – Paul Eluard, French poet (b. 1895)
- November 20 – Benedetto Croce, Italian critic, philosopher, and politician (b. 1866)
- November 21 – Henriette Roland Holst, Dutch poet and socialist (b. 1869)
- November 22 – Otto Dietrich, Nazi SS General (b. 1897)
- November 25 – Antonio Guarnieri, Italian conductor (b. 1880)
- November 26 – Sven Hedin, Swedish explorer, geographer and geopolitician (b. 1865)
- November 28 – Elena of Montenegro, Queen of Italy, consort of Victor Emmanuel III (b. 1869)
- November 29 – Vladimir Ipatieff, Soviet chemist (b. 1867)

=== December ===
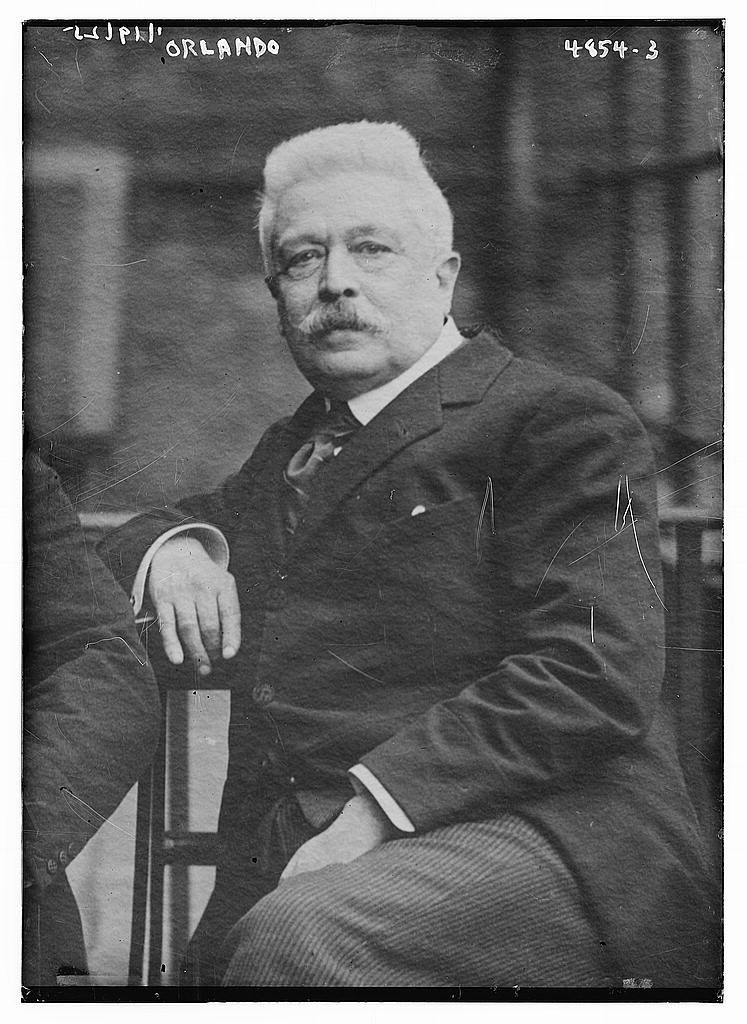
Vittorio Emanuele Orlando

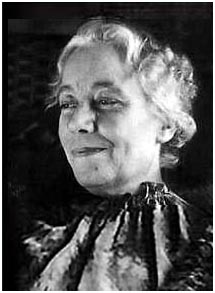
Karen Horney

- December 1 – Vittorio Emanuele Orlando, Italian statesman, 23rd Prime Minister of Italy (b. 1860)
- December 3 – Vladimír Clementis, Czechoslovak minister, politician, publicist, literary critic and author (b. 1902)
- December 4
  - Giuseppe Antonio Borgese, Italian writer and journalist (b. 1882)
  - Karen Horney, German psychoanalyst (b. 1885)
- December 8 – Charles Lightoller, British merchant marine officer, second officer of RMS Titanic (b. 1874)
- December 12
  - Billy Cook, American criminal (b. 1928)
  - Bedrich Hrozný, Czech orientalist and linguist (b. 1879)
- December 14
  - Teixeira de Pascoaes, Portuguese poet (b. 1877)
  - Fartein Valen, Norwegian composer (b. 1887)
- December 18 – Ernst Stromer, German paleontologist (b. 1871)
- December 25
  - Bernardino Molinari, Italian conductor (b. 1880)
  - Herman Sörgel, German architect (b. 1885)
- December 27 – Henri Winkelman, Dutch general (b. 1876)
- December 28
  - Carlo Agostini, Italian Roman Catholic prelate and reverend (b. 1871)
  - Alexandrine of Mecklenburg-Schwerin, Queen consort of Christian X of Denmark (b. 1879)
- December 29 – Fletcher Henderson, American musician (b. 1897)

== Nobel Prizes ==

- Physics – Felix Bloch, Edward Mills Purcell
- Chemistry – Archer John Porter Martin, Richard Laurence Millington Synge
- Medicine – Selman Abraham Waksman
- Literature – François Mauriac
- Peace – Albert Schweitzer
