= Järnefelt =

Swedish and Finnish surname

Järnefelt is a surname originating in Sweden and Finland. Notable people with the surname include:

- Aino Sibelius (née Järnefelt; 1871–1969), Finnish wife of composer Jean Sibelius
- Alexander Järnefelt (1833–1896), Finnish general, political figure, and topographer
- Armas Järnefelt (1869–1958), Finnish composer and conductor
- Arvid Järnefelt (1861–1932), Finnish judge and writer
- Eero Järnefelt (1863–1937), Finnish realist painter
- Eero Järnefelt (diplomat) (1888–1970), diplomat, ambassador, and son of Arvid
- Elisabeth Järnefelt (1839–1929), “mother of Finnish art and culture”
- Erna Gräsbeck-Järnefelt (1879–1958), Finnish opera singer
- Gustaf Järnefelt (1901–1989), Finnish astronomer
- Liva Järnefelt (1876–1971), Swedish opera singer, and the second wife of Armas
- Maikki Järnefelt (1871–1929), Finnish opera singer, and the first wife of Armas

== See also ==
- 1558 Järnefelt, a main belt asteroid
