= Malinconia (Sibelius) =

Duo for cello and piano by Jean Sibelius (1900)

- Duo by Jean Sibelius
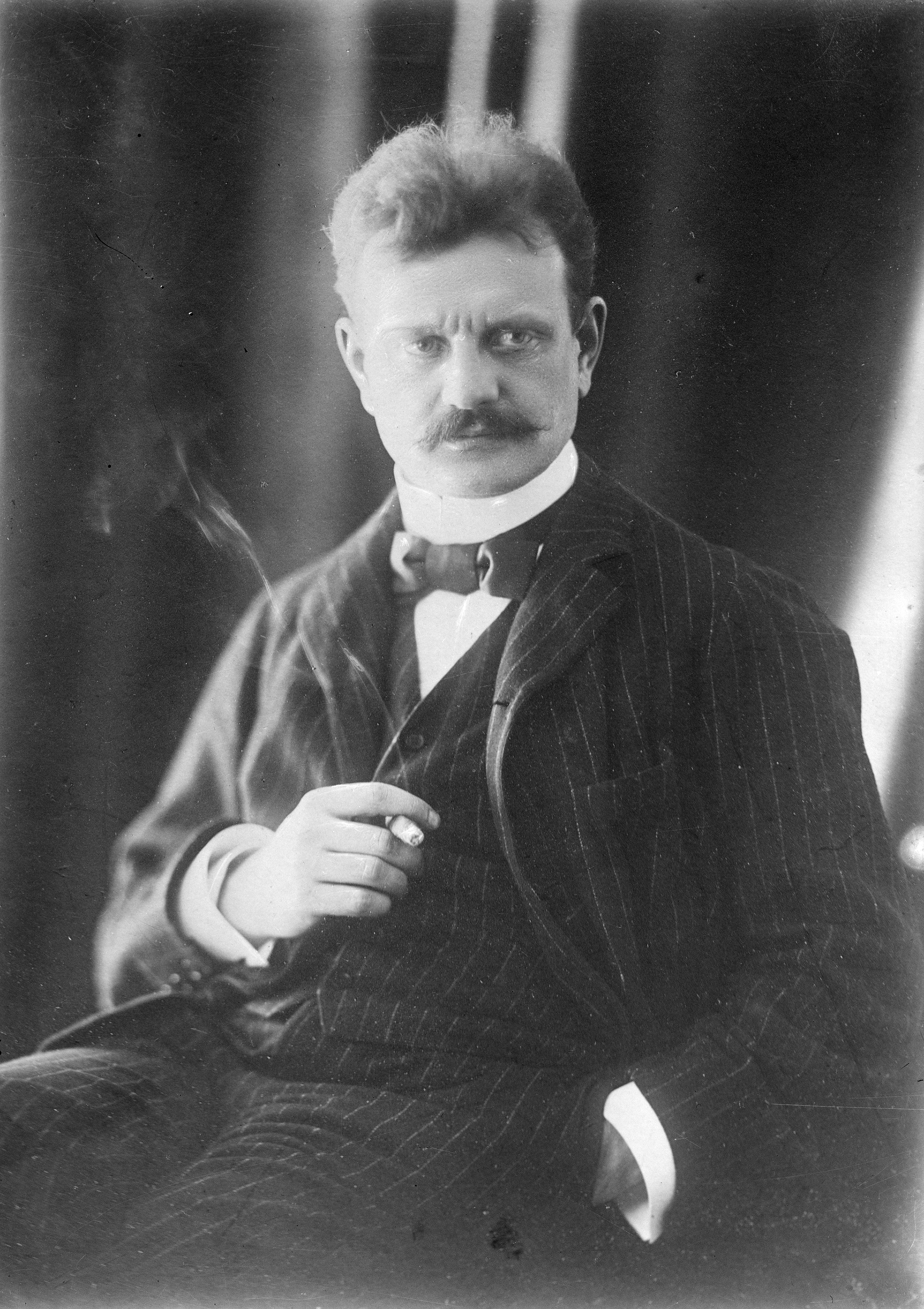
- The composer (c. 1902)
- Opus: 20
- Composed: 1900
- Publisher: Breitkopf & Härtel (1911)
- Duration: 12 mins

Premiere
- Date: 12 March 1900
- Location: Helsinki, Grand Duchy of Finland
- Performers: Georg Schnéevoigt (cello); Sigrid Sundgren (piano)

Malinconia (literal English translation: "Melancholy"), Op. 20, is a single-movement duo for cello and piano written in 1900 by the Finnish composer Jean Sibelius.

== History ==
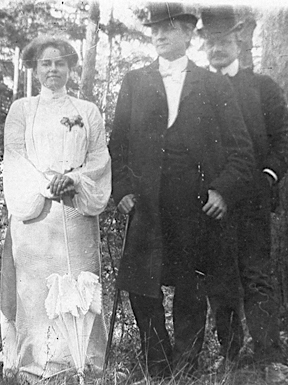
Left to rightː the pianist Sigrid Sundgren, the cellist Georg Schnéevoigt, and Sibelius (c. 1905)

In late 1899 and early 1900, a typhus epidemic swept through southern Finland, near Kerava. Sibelius's brother-in-law, the Finnish playwright Arvid Järnefelt, (Note: In 1903, Sibelius collaborated with Arvid Järnefelt by writing incidental music to his brother-in-law's play Death (Kuolema).) had just lost his infant daughter, Anna (1898 – 1899) on 28 December, and as such, Aino Sibelius (née Järnefelt) traveled to Lohja to assist the Järnefelts as they mourned; Sibelius and the couple's three daughters—Eva, Ruth, and Kirsti—remained in Helsinki. However, the epidemic soon claimed Kirsti (1898 – 1900), as well, who died on 13 February. (Aino suspected that she had accidentally carried the deadly bacteria home with her.) Devastated, a grieving Sibelius turned to drink, while Aino and the other daughters sought to outrun the disease by relocating to Aino's mother's home in Lohja.

In early March, Sibelius composed—purportedly in just three hours—a duo for cello and piano that he named Fantasia (later retitled Malinconia). The piece received its premiere on 12 March 1900 in Helsinki; the cellist was Georg Schnéevoigt, the dedicatee, accompanied by the pianist Sigrid Sundgren (the two later married in 1907).

== Music ==
Malinconia, which has a duration of about 12 minutes, is in 12/8 time and has a tempo marking of Adagio pesante.

== Discography ==
The Danish cellist Louis Jensen and the Russian-born Danish pianist Galina Werschenska made the world premiere studio recording of Malinonia in 1936 for the His Master's Voice (since re-released by Warner Classics). The sortable table below lists this and other commercially available recordings:

No.	Cello	Piano	Runtime (Note: All runtimes are official, as printed on CD or LP liner notes.)	Rec. (Note: Refers to the year in which the performers recorded the work; this may not be the same as the year in which the recording was first released to the general public.)	Recording venue	Label	Ref.							
1	Cello	Piano	Runtime	Rec.	Recording venue	Label	Ref.	Louis Jensen	Galina Werschenska	9:05	1936	[Unknown], Copenhagen	Warner Classics	(Note: L. Jensen & G. Werschenska–Warner Classics (0825646053179) 2015)
2	Arto Noras	Tapani Valsta	12:05	1971	[Unknown], Heidelberg	Da Camera Magna	(Note: A. Noras & T. Valsta–Da Camera Magna (DaCa 77 089) 1970s)							
3	Thomas Blees	Maria Bergmann	?	1972	[Unknown], Baden-Baden	SWR Music	(Note: T. Blees & M. Bergmann–SWR Music (SWR10324) 2016)							
4	Pär Öjebo	Albena Zaharieva	12:22	?	Örebro Concert Hall	Opus 3	(Note: P. Öjebo & A. Zaharieva–Opus 3 (Nr 8011) 1983)							
5	Heinrich Schiff	Elisabeth Leonskaja	11:47	1984	Salle de Musique, La Chaux-de-Fonds	Philips	(Note: H. Schiff & E. Leonskaja–Philips (412 732–1) 1986)							
6	Raimo Sariola	Hui-Ying Liu-Tawaststjerna	12:27	1985	Imatra Concert Hall	Finlandia	(Note: R. Sariola & H. Liu-Tawaststjerna–Finlandia (FAD 351) 1986)							
7	Martti Rousi	Juhani Lagerspetz	11:34	1988	Martinus Hall	Ondine	(Note: M. Rousi & J. Lagerspetz–Ondine (ODE 717–2) 1988)							
8	Truls Mørk	Jean-Yves Thibaudet	12:31	1993	Ski Hall, Torgveien	Virgin Classics	(Note: T. Mørk & J. Thibaudet–Virgin Classics (7243 5 45034 2 9) 1994)							
9	Erkki Rautio	Izumi Tateno	10:52	1995	Ainola	Canyon Classics	(Note: E. Rautio & I. Tateno–Canyon Classics (PCCL–00328) 1996)							
10	Torleif Thedéen	Folke Gräsbeck	12:18	1996	Danderyds gymnasium	BIS	(Note: T. Thedéen & F. Gräsbeck–BIS (CD–817) 1996)							
11	Tanja Tetzlaff	Gunilla Süssmann	13:29	2005	St. Cosmas & Damian Church	Avi Music	(Note: T. Tetzlaff & G. Süssmann–Avi Music (AVI8553082) 2007)							
12	Jussi Makkonen	Rait Karm	10:41	2007	Concert Hall, Sibelius Academy	Naxos	(Note: J. Makkonen & R. Karm–Naxos (8.570797) 2008)							
13	Alexey Stadler	Karina Sposobina	12:56	2008	Evangelical Lutheran Church of Saint Catherine	Northern Flowers	(Note: A. Stadler & K. Sposobina–Northern Flowers (NF/PMA 9979) 2009)							
14	Mattia Zappa	Massimiliano Mainolfi	12:02	2010	Siemens-Villa	Claves Records	(Note: M. Zappa & M. Mainolfi–Claves (CD 50–1011) 2010)							
15	David Geringas	Ian Fountain	10:45	2011	Kammermusikstudio, SWR Stuttgart	Profil	(Note: D. Geringas & I. Fountain–Profil (PH15005) 2015)							
16	Steven Isserlis	Olli Mustonen	10:39	2013	Potton Hall, Suffolk	BIS	(Note: S. Isserlis & O. Mustonen–BIS (SACD–2049) 2014)							
17	Rohan de Saram	Benjamin Frith	12:18	2014	Tonbridge School, Kent	First Hand	(Note: R. De Saram & B. Frith–First Hand (FHR34) 2014)							
18	Adrian Bradbury	Sophia Rahman	10:25	2017	Sidney Sussex College Chapel	Resonus Classics	(Note: A. Bradbury & S. Rahman–Resonus Classics (RES10205) 2018)							
19	Niklas Schmidt	Stepan Simonian	11:14	2020	Friedrich-Ebert-Halle Hamburg	Fontenay Classics	(Note: N. Schmidt & S. Simonian–Fontenay Classics (FCI015) 2021)							

== Notes, references, and sources ==
Notes

Sources

- Barnett, Andrew (2007). Sibelius. New Haven: Yale University Press. ISBN 978-0-300-11159-0.
- Dahlström, Fabian [in Swedish] (2003). Jean Sibelius: Thematisch-bibliographisches Verzeichnis seiner Werke [Jean Sibelius: A Thematic Bibliographic Index of His Works] (in German). Wiesbaden: Breitkopf & Härtel. ISBN 3-7651-0333-0.
