= Berceuse (Järnefelt) =

Cradle song for orchestra by Armas Järnefelt

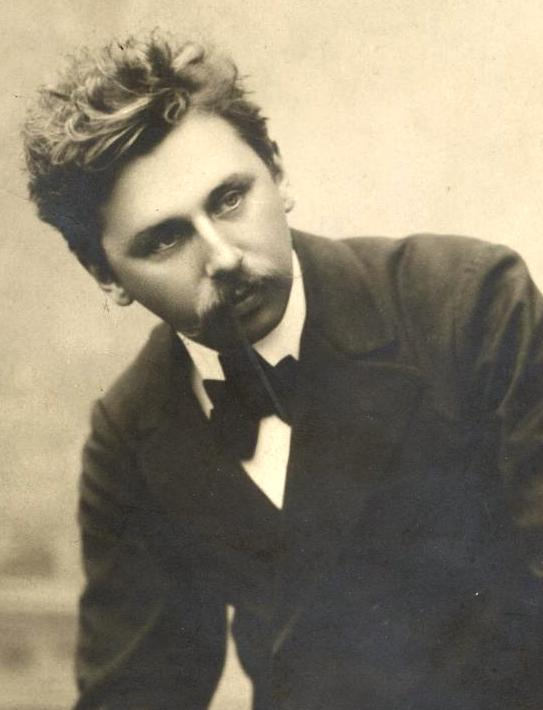
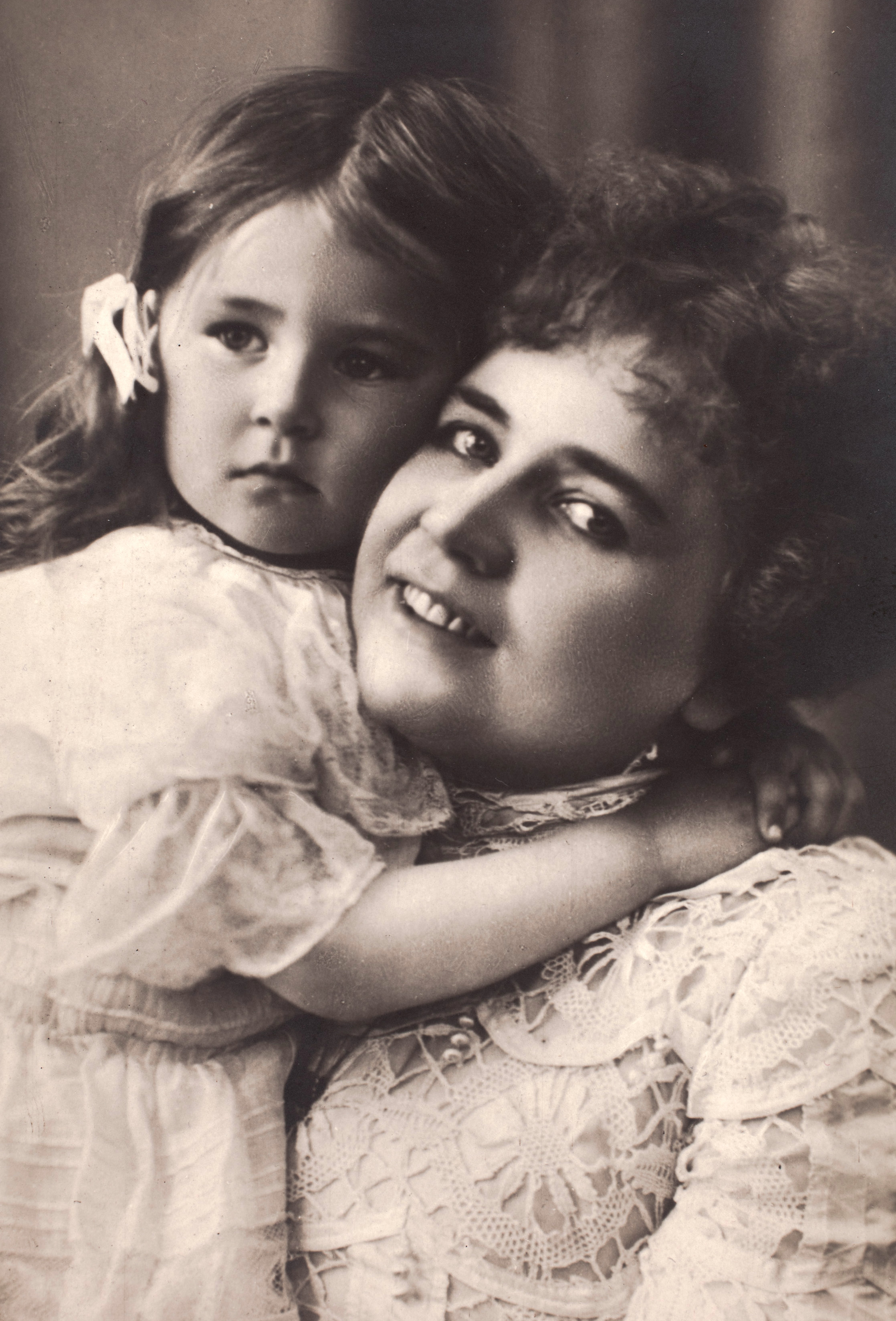
Järnefelt (left) was inspired to compose his Berceuse upon seeing his young daughter, Eva (held by her mother Maikki, right), asleep in bed with a fever.

The Berceuse in G minor (sometimes followed parenthetically by the Finnish translation Kehtolaulu or by the English translation Cradle Song) is a concert piece for violin and accompaniment written in 1904 by the Finnish composer Armas Järnefelt. Originally for violin and piano, the piece is better known as an arrangement for violin and orchestra that Järnefelt made the same year. At this time, he also made a version of solo piano.

Along with the earlier Prelude (Preludi) for orchestra (1900), the Berceuse is Järnefelt's most well-known piece—together, their popularity has "eclipsed" the composer's other works. Indeed, the two "melodically charming miniatures" frequently are recorded together. A typical performance of the Berceuse lasts about three minutes.

== History ==
According to Järnefelt, he wrote the Berceuse in one sitting, having been inspired upon seeing his young daughter, Eva (then about two-years old, having been born on 7 November 1901), asleep in bed with a fever. Appropriately, then, it is a peaceful, "beautifully atmospheric" cradle song with a touch of melancholy, as the solo violin's main theme is "warm" yet "sorrowfully songful".

Järnefelt sold the Berceuse to the Helsinki-based publishing house of Helsingfors nya musikhandel (K. G. Fazer), which in 1905 began issuing the piece—in all three versions by the composer—in conjunction with the German firm Breitkopf & Härtel. The version for violin and piano, moreover, includes a dedication to the Swedish violinist Sigrid Lindberg.

== Music ==
It is scored for violin solo, 2 clarinets (in B♭), bassoon, 2 horns (in F), and strings. The tempo is marked Andante; the piece is in 2/4 and the key of G minor.

The main theme, beginning at measure 5

== Recordings ==
The sortable table below lists commercially available recordings of the Berceuse:

No.	Conductor	Orchestra	Violin solo	Rec. (Note: Refers to the year in which the performers recorded the work; this may not be the same as the year in which the recording was first released to the general public.)	Time	Recording venue	Label	Ref.
1	Rosario Bourdon	Victor Concert Orchestra	[Unknown] (Note: This liner notes to this recording do not specify the name of the violin soloist.)	1926	2:55	Camden, New Jersey	Victor	(Note: R. Bourdon–Victor (20374–A) 1927)
2	Sir Malcolm Sargent	Royal Opera Orchestra	[Unknown]	1928	3:08	Covent Garden	His Master's Voice	(Note: M. Sargent–HMV (B 2618) 1928)
3	Marek Weber	Merek Weber Orchestra	[Unknown]	?	2:44	?	His Master's Voice	(Note: M. Weber–HMV (X 3039) yyyy)
4	Sir John Barbirolli	London Symphony Orchestra	[Unknown]	1933	2:56	Abbey Road Studios	Warner Classics	(Note: [ J. Barbirolli–Warner Classics (0190295386085) 2020])
5	Hans Kindler	National Symphony Orchestra (Note: Upon being re-released via the budget label RCA Camden in the 1950s, the National Symphony Orchestra was credited under the pseudonym the "Globe Symphony Orchestra".)	[Unknown]	1947	3:03	?	RCA Victor	(Note: H. Kindler–RCA Victor (10–1245) 1947)
6	Lennart Hedwall	Örebro Chamber Orchestra	[Unknown]	1974	3:06	Örebro Castle	Swedish Society	(Note: L. Hedwall–Swedish Society (SCD 1007) 1989)
7	Kyösti Haatanen	Jyväskylä City Orchestra	Dagmar Prochákova	1982	3:32	Taulumäki Church	Finlandia	(Note: K. Haatanen–Finlandia (FA 906) 1982)
8	Pertti Pekkanen	Finnish Radio Symphony Orchestra	Jorma Rahkonen	1988	3:17	Kulttuuritalo	yle	(Note: P. Pekkanen–yle (YLE LP 7) 1988)
9	Esa-Pekka Salonen	Swedish Radio Symphony Orchestra	Mats Zetterqvist	1990	3:06	Berwald Hall	Sony Classical	(Note: E. Salonen–Sony Classical (SK 46668) 1991)
10	Leif Segerstam	Helsinki Philharmonic Orchestra	Erkki Palola	1994	3:12	Finlandia Hall	Ondine	(Note: L. Segerstam–Ondine (ODE 824–2) 1994)
11	Neeme Järvi (1)	Detroit Symphony Orchestra	Emmanuelle Boisvert	1994	3:54	Orchestra Hall	DSO	(Note: N. Järvi–DSO (DSOH 01) 1997)
12	Neeme Järvi (2)	Gothenburg Symphony Orchestra	Christer Thorvaldsson	1995	3:05	Gothenburg Concert Hall	Deutsche Grammophon	(Note: N. Järvi–DG (471 747–2) 2002)
13	Jorma Panula	Turku Philharmonic Orchestra	Maarit Kirvessalo	1995	3:03	Turku Concert Hall	Naxos	(Note: J. Panula–Naxos (8.555773) 2001)
14	Hannu Koivula	Gävle Symphony Orchestra	[Unknown]	1996	3:28	Orkestersalen Gävle	Sterling Records	(Note: H. Koivula–Sterling (CDS–1021–2) 1997)
15	Jaakko Kuusisto	Lahti Symphony Orchestra	Jaakko Kuusisto	2008	3:40	Sibelius Hall	BIS	(Note: J. Kuusisto–BIS (CD–1753) 2010)

== Notes, references, and sources ==
Notes

Sources

- Anderson, Keith (2001). Finnish Orchestral Favorites: Sibelius / Järnefelt / Sallinen / Rautavaara (CD booklet). Jorma Panula & Turku Philharmonic Orchestra. Naxos. p. 2–3. 8.555773.
- Korhonen, Kimmo [in Finnish] (2007) [2003]. Inventing Finnish Music: Contemporary Composers from Medieval to Modern. Translated by Mäntyjärvi, Jaakko [in Finnish] (2nd ed.). Jyväskylä, Finland: Finnish Music Information Center (FIMIC) & Gummerus Kirjapaino Oy. ISBN 978-9-525-07661-5.
- Korhonen, Kimmo (2009). Armas Järnefelt: Symphonic Fantasy / Berceuse / Serenade / Suite in E-flat major (CD booklet). Jaakko Kuusisto & Lahti Symphony Orchestra. BIS. p. 3–7. 1753.
