= Valse Triste (ballet) =

Valse Triste is a ballet choreographed by Peter Martins when he was balletmaster at the New York City Ballet to Sibelius's eponymous waltz as well as the music called Scene with Cranes from his incidental music for the play Kuolema (Death). The crane is a symbol of death in Finnish literature. The premiere took place on May 23, 1985, at the New York State Theater, Lincoln Center, with original lighting by Ronald Bates and current lighting by Mark Stanley.

== Original cast ==
- Patricia McBride
- Ib Andersen

== Articles ==
- Kaye, Elizabeth (January 1, 1995). "A Prima Ballerina Takes a Final Bow". The New York Times.

== Reviews ==
- NY Times, Alastair Macaulay, January 25, 2008
- NY Times, Jack Anderson, January 6, 2000
- NY Times, Jennifer Dunning, June 22, 1992
