= Valse Triste (disambiguation) =

Valse triste is a 1904 orchestral piece by Jean Sibelius.

Valse Triste may also refer to:

- Valse Triste (film), a 1977 experimental collage film by Bruce Conner
- Valse Triste (ballet), a 1985 ballet by Peter Martins
- Valse triste, a 1977 ballet by Bruno Liberda
