= Armas Järnefelt =

Finnish conductor and composer (1869–1958)

Järnefelt (c. 1907)

Edvard Armas Järnefelt (14 August 1869 – 23 June 1958) was a Finnish and Swedish conductor and composer, who achieved some minor success with his orchestral works Berceuse (1904) and Praeludium (1900). He spent much of his conducting career at the Royal Swedish Opera in Stockholm, Sweden.

== Life ==
Armas Järnefelt was born in Vyborg, in the Grand Duchy of Finland, the son of General August Aleksander Järnefelt and Elisabeth Järnefelt (née Clodt von Jürgensburg).

Järnefelt studied with Ferruccio Busoni in Helsinki and with Jules Massenet in Paris. Both Järnefelt and Busoni enjoyed a close relationship with Jean Sibelius, who was married to Järnefelt's sister Aino. From 1905 Järnefelt had a long career as conductor at the Royal Swedish Opera in Stockholm, beginning as repetiteur from 1905 to 1911 (he became a Swedish citizen in 1909); conductor 1911-1923 and chief conductor 1923–1933.

Between 1932 and 1936 Järnefelt was the artistic director and conductor of the Finnish National Opera. He presented, among others, Siegfried and Götterdämmerung from Wagner's Ring cycle, and Parsifal. He was the principal conductor of the Helsinki Philharmonic Orchestra 1942–1943, and also returned to the Royal Swedish Opera as chief conductor from 1938 to 1946. He died in Stockholm.

== Works ==
External audio
- You may hear Armas Järnefelt's compositions Praeludiem and Berceuse as conducted by Hans Kindler with his National Symphony Orchestra in 1947 Here on archive.org

Järnefelt's musical works include:

- Lyrical Overture (1892)
- Lapsuuden ajoilta (Childhood Days, 1892) 4-hand piano
- Serenade for Small Orchestra in B minor (1893)
- Symphonic poem Korsholma (Korsholm, 1894)
- Symphonic Fantasy for orchestra (1895)
- Symphonic poem Heimathklang (The Sound of Home, 1895)
- 3 Piano Pieces Op.4 (1897)
- Suite in E-flat major for orchestra (1897)
- Finnish Rhapsody (1899)
- Praeludium (1900)
- Festive Overture (1902)
- Berceuse (1904)

In addition, he composed more than 70 solo songs, 21 pieces for male chorus, 12 part-songs for mixed chorus, and 13 cantatas. His Berceuse (1904) arranged for violin and piano is included in the Royal Conservatory of Music grade 7 violin repertoire (Canada).

Järnefelt also wrote stage and film music, e.g. for the film Song of the Scarlet Flower (1919), directed by Mauritz Stiller, possibly the first original film music by a Nordic composer.

== Family life ==
His siblings were Kasper Järnefelt, a critic and translator of Russian literature; the writer Arvid Järnefelt (the incidental music for his play Kuolema was written by Jean Sibelius); the painter Eero Järnefelt (Erik); Ellida; Ellen, Aino (who married Sibelius); Hilja; and Sigrid.

He was married twice: firstly to the soprano Maikki Järnefelt (née Pakarinen) from 1893 to 1908 (she subsequently married Selim Palmgren), and secondly in 1910 to the opera singer Liva Edström.

== Legacy ==
In June 2012 a display of Järnefelt paraphernalia was opened in the entrance of the Sibelius Academy situated in the Helsinki Music Center.

Preceded by Georg Schnéevoigt	Principal conductors, Helsinki Philharmonic Orchestra; 1942–1943	Succeeded by Martti Similä
