= Sigurd von Numers =

Finnish diplomat

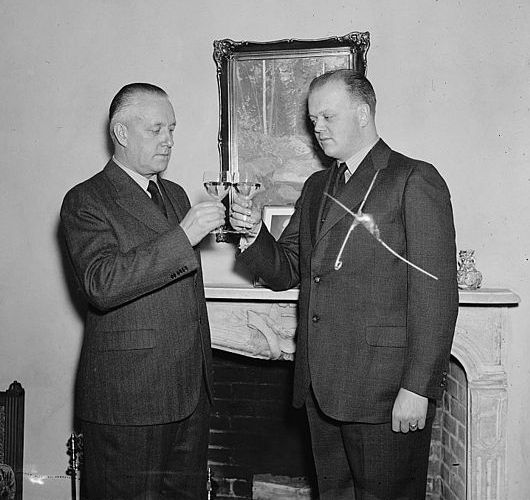
Envoy Eero Järnefelt (left) and Secretary of Security, Sigurd von Numers, drank a bowl in honor of Pehr Evind Svinhufvud's 75th anniversary in Washington, D.C., 1936.

Sigurd Valdemar von Numers (20 March 1903 – 1983) was a Finnish diplomat, a Doctor of Law from 1928. He was awarded the title of the Consul General in 1944.

von Numers was born in Viipuri. He served as Chargé d'Affaires in Ottawa, Canada, from 1954 to 1959, to India in New Delhi from 1959 to 1960, Ambassador to the United States from 1960 to 1961 and in the Netherlands as ambassador 1964–1970. Before and after international commissions he was head of the Legal Department of the Ministry for Foreign Affairs from 1949 to 1954 and again from 1961.

During the 1930s, in Stockholm, as a secretary of state, von Numers interfered with the so-called Maydell affair, for example, by granting Nansen passport to Russian citizen residing in Germany, Baron Karl Frederick Karl Viktor von Maydell-Felks (born 1899) who was dubious to make a film in Finland.
