= Ernst Gustaf Palmén =

Finnish historian and politician (1849–1919)

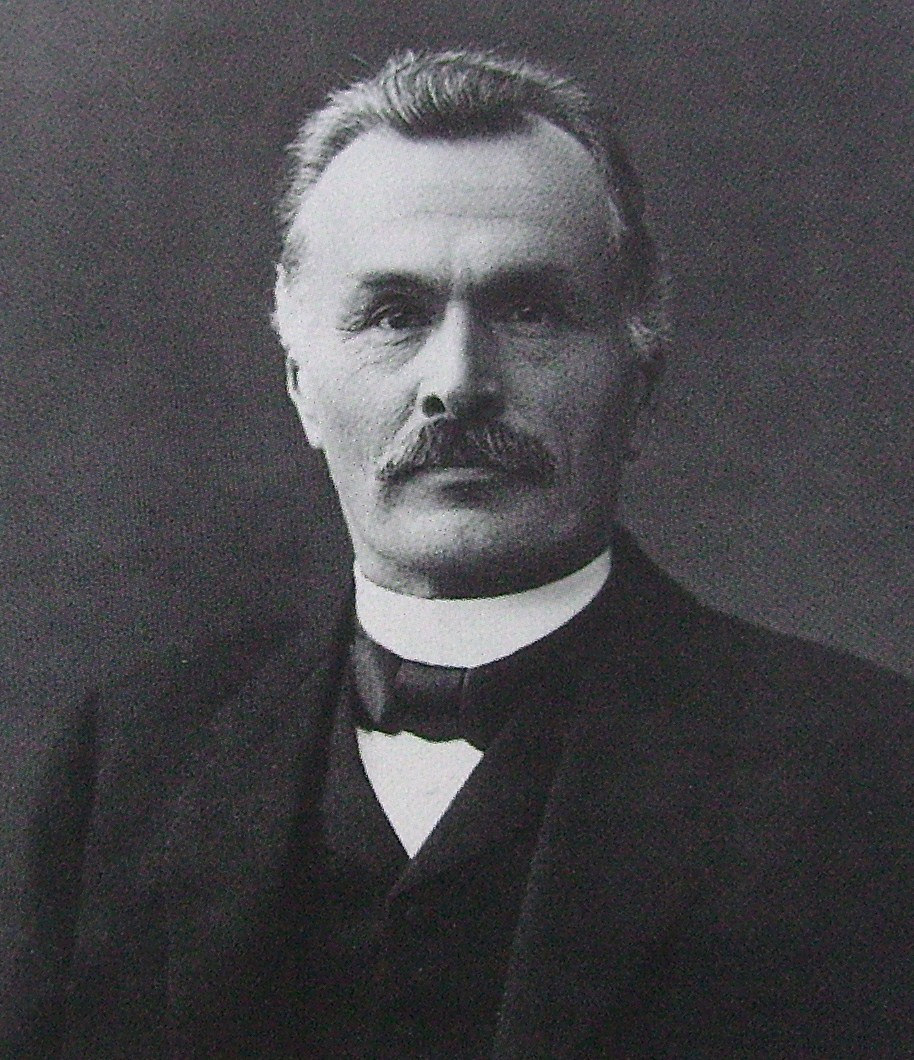
Ernst G. Palmén

Baron, State Councillor Ernst Gustaf (E. G.) Palmén (26 November 1849 – 3 December 1919) was a Finnish historian and politician, born in Helsinki. He was a member of the Diet of Finland from 1877 to 1878, in 1882, 1885, 1888, 1891, 1894, 1897, 1899, 1900, from 1904 to 1905 and from 1905 to 1906 and of the Parliament of Finland from 1907 to 1909, representing the Finnish Party.

Palmén was among a group of individuals, along with Arvid Järnefelt, who launched the Finnish language literary and cultural magazine Valvoja in 1880.

== Publications ==
- Stenografin och dess användning i dagliga lifvet (1873)
- Historisk framställning af den svensk-finska handelslagstiftningens utveckling från Gustaf Wasa till 1766 (1876)
- Suomalaisen Kirjallisuuden Seuran viisikymmenvuotinen toimi ynnä suomalaisuuden edistys 1831-81 (1881)
- Sten Stures strid med konung Hans (1883)
- Anders Fryxell och hans Berättelser ur svenska historien (1886)
- Anders Fryxell ja hänen kertomuksensa Ruotsin historiasta (1898)
- Karelska jernvägsfrågan (1888)
- Karjalan radasta (1888)
- Lisiä lahjoitusmaakysymyksen historiaan (1895)
- Suomen kansan asevelvollisuudesta muinoin ja nyt (1898)
- Silmäys Itä-Suomen lahjoitusmaitten historiaan (1899)
- Vår framtida järnvägspolitik (1899)
- Vastaisesta rautatiepolitiikastamme (1899)
- Z. Topelius oman ajan arvostelussa (1899)
- Återblick och framtidsmål (1900)
- Äldre och nyare sjöfällningar och sjöfällningsförsök i Finland (1902-03)
- Anders Chydenius (1903)
- Kuusi puhetta valtiopäivillä 1904-1905 (1905)
- Puhe Suomalaisen Nuijan kokouksessa 6/12 06 (1906)
- Helsingfors 1800-1900 (1907)
- Kulkulaitokset ja posti (1910)
- Suomen valtiopäiväin historia (1910)
- Suomen metsälainsäädäntö vuoteen 1861 (1914)
- 1869 vuoden kirkkolain vanhemmista esitöistä (1915)
- Lefnadsteckning (Öfver Johan Philip Palmén) (1915)
- Vuoden 1852 yliopistosääntöjen synnystä (1915)
- Valtaistuinpuheet valtiopäivillä 1863-64 (1916)
- Henry Biaudet (1917)
- Tietgen (1917)
