= Knud Arne Jürgensen =

Danish music historian (born 1952)

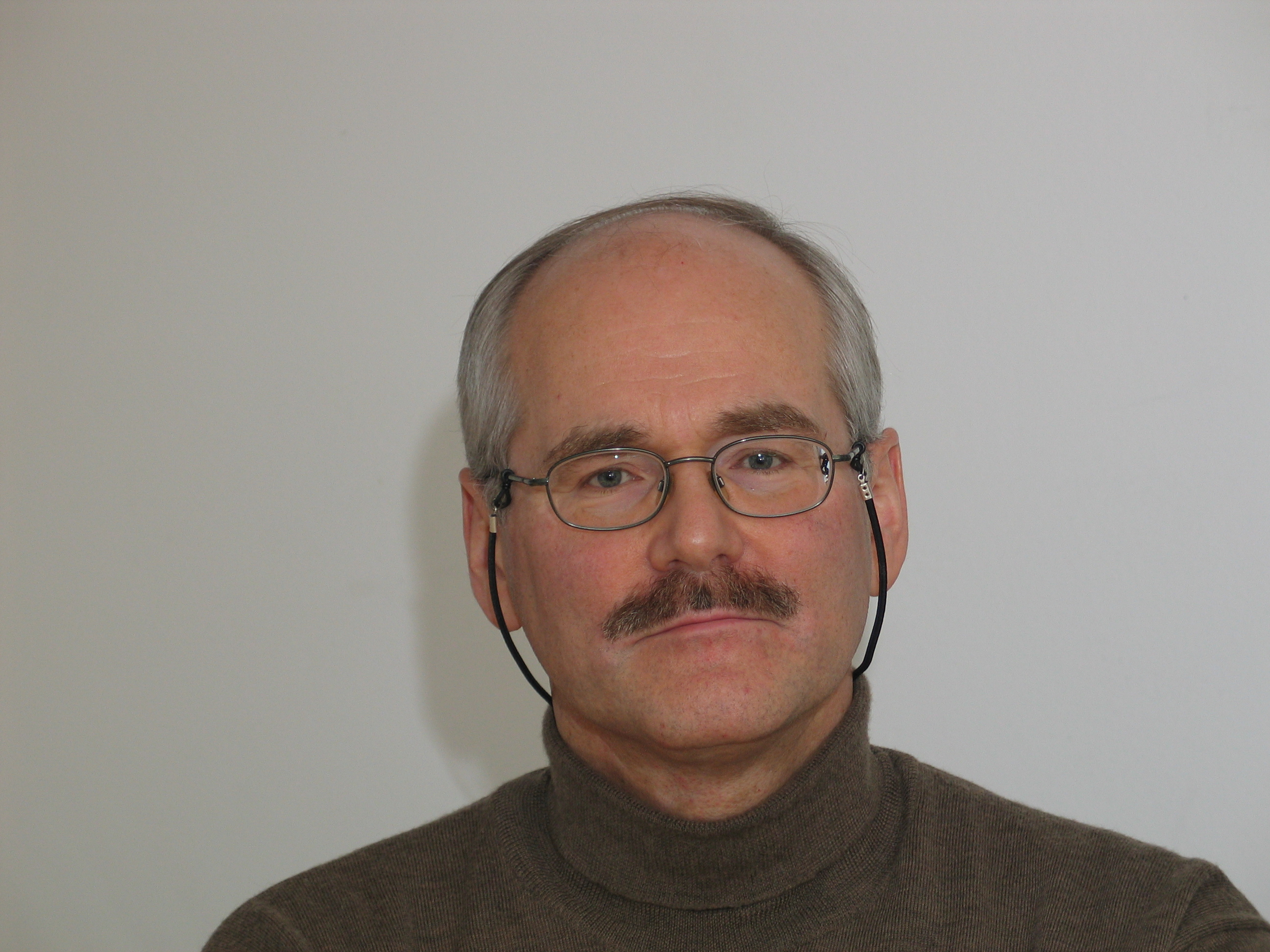
- Born: 1952 (age 73–74); Copenhagen
- Citizenship: Danish and Italian
- Education: University of Copenhagen
- Known for: Dance, music, opera and theatre history
- Awards: Knight (Cavaliere) of the Italian Republic
- Website: https://sites.google.com/site/knudarnejurgensen/startside-home

Knud Arne Jürgensen (born 1952) is a Danish music-, opera-, ballet- and theater historian, dramaturg, curator of exhibitions, senior researcher, critic, dr. phil.

== Biography ==
Jürgensen studied music and theater history at the University of Copenhagen from 1975 and for seven years, but had previously to his studies in musicology studied piano with professor Galina Werschenska and later at the Royal Danish Academy of Music in Copenhagen. The combination of research in the fields of music, theater and dance has followed him since.

During two periods in the late 1980s and mid-1990s, Knud Arne Jürgensen was a research fellow of the Danish Carlsberg Foundation. The work resulted in three English-language monographs on the Danish dancer, choreographer and ballet master August Bournonville, on whom Jürgensen has continued to work extensively which his considerable list of publications and several exhibitions testify to. An international theme exhibition at the Royal Danish Library, and a poster exhibition at The Royal Danish Theatre were carried out in the Bournonville jubilee-year 2005 marking the bicentenary of his birth.

When Knud Arne Jürgensen in 1997 made his doctoral thesis (dr. phil., equivalent to Doctor of Music), it was with a music and theater historical thesis on the composer Giuseppe Verdi and the ballets in his operas, which resulted in Verdi ballet performances at the Berlin State Opera in 1999 (the ballet "Verdiana") and the Vienna State Opera in 2001 ("Verdi Ballet: Ein Maskenball"). He has furthermore written in-depth biographies of danish theater critics Herman Bang, Frederik Schyberg and Jens Kistrup and was chief editor and program author when the complete orchestral works by danish composer Hans Christian Lumbye were recorded during the period 1998-2004. In addition, he has reconstructed a number of forgotten choreographies of August Bournonville following the choreographer's original records.

Knud Arne Jürgensen was also co-editor of the orchestral scores for the Bournonville ballet A Folk Tale (Et folkesagn) and a number of Lumbye works as a gift from the Royal Danish Library to Her Majesty Queen Margrethe II on her 60th birthday in 2000 and 70th birthday in 2010. Recently he has edited the CD-recording of Lumbye-works Fredensborgdage for the Royal Danish Lifeguards as a present on the occasion of Her Majesty Queen Margrethe II's 75th birthday in 2015.

== Professional career ==
Jürgensen was from 1998 to 2010 Head of the Drama Collection, research librarian, senior researcher and subject specialist in theater and performing arts at the Royal Danish Library. From 2011 to 2017 he has worked as exhibition curator, senior researcher and subject specialist at the Copenhagen Theatre Museum in the Court Theatre, where he has completed his most recent monographs on the late Danish theater critic Jens Kistrup, (published in 2012), and the first complete and annotated edition of the plays by Danish impressionist writer, Herman Bang (published in 2016).

He has also been a Fellow at the Danish Academy in Rome from 2011 to 2012, where he has been working on editing and publishing the score for the Italian baroque opera Il Valdemaro by the Neapolitan composer Domenico Sarro, a work that represents one of the earliest operas based on a Scandinavian theme, and which appeared for the first time on print in a new critical edition in 2013.

Knud Arne Jürgensen, who has been a member and trustee of several professional boards, has published more than 30 Danish and international monographs in the field of music history and the performing arts and well over hundred scientific papers and essays. He has curated more than 20 Danish and international thematic exhibitions and guest lectured at the University of Copenhagen as well as at a large number of foreign universities, museums and theater institutions in the United States, Russia, Austria, Italy, France and Germany.

== Main writings (chronologically) ==
- Jürgensen, Knud Arne: The Bournonville Ballets A Photographic Record 1844-1933. London, Dance Books, 1987, xvi + 179 pp., ill., ISBN 0-903102-98-6
- Jürgensen, Knud Arne: The Bournonville Heritage A Choreographic Record 1829-1875. London, Dance Books, 1990, Textbook (xx + 186 pp.), Piano score (x + 62 pp.), ISBN 1 85273 025 0 (Textbook), ISBN 1 85273 030 7 (Piano score)
- Jürgensen, Knud Arne and Flindt, Vivi: Bournonville Ballet Technique Fifty Enchaînements, London, Dance Books, 1992. Textbook (xxix + 111 pp., ill.) + Piano score (vi + 37 pp., ill.) + DVD eller VHS Video cassette (Dance Video 3), ISBN 1 85273 035 8 (Textbook), ISBN 1 85273 036 6 (Piano score)
- Jürgensen, Knud Arne: The Verdi Ballets. Parma, Istituto Nazionale di Studi Verdiani, 1995. 398 pp. ill., ISBN 88-85065-12-0
- Jürgensen, Knud Arne: The Bournonville Tradition. The First Fifty Years 1829-1879. I: A Documentary Study. II: An annotated bibliography of the choreography and the music, the chronology, the performing history, and the sources. London, Dance Books, 1997, 2 volumes, 201 + 468 pp., ill., ISBN 1 85273 055 2 (Volume I), ISBN 1 85273 056 0 (Volume II), ISBN 1 85273 075 7 (Volumes I & II)
- Jürgensen, Knud Arne (ed.): August Bournonville: My dearly beloved Wife! Letters from France and Italy 1841. Introduction and annotations by Knud Arne Jürgensen, Translated from the Danish by Patricia N. McAndrew (Dance Books, Alton, 2005, 192 pp., ill., ISBN 1 85273 106 0
- Jürgensen, Knud Arne (ed.): August Bournonville, Études Chorégraphiques (1848-1855- 1861). A cura di/Sous la direction de/Edited by Knud Arne Jürgensen e/et/and Francesca Falcone (Libreria Musicale Italiana, Lucca, 2005, 356 pp., ill., ISBN 88-7096-401-9
- Jürgensen, Knud Arne (ed.): Digterens & Balletmesterens luner, H.C. Andersens og August Bournonvilles brevveksling Udgivet med indledning og kommentar af Knud Arne Jürgensen (Gyldendal, København, 2005, 268 pp., ill., ISBN 87-02-03751-3).
- Jürgensen, Knud Arne: Dramaturgiske Pennetegninger. Herman Bang som teateressayist. En antologi. Udgivet og kommenteret af Knud Arne Jürgensen (Odense, Syddansk Universitetsforlag, 2007, I-XXIV + 452 pp., ill., ISBN 978-87- 7674-190-7
- Jürgensen, Knud Arne: Et Folkesagn, 1.-3. akt. Udgivet af Anne Ørbæk Jensen, Knud Arne Jürgensen og Niels Krabbe. Orchestral score, 2 volumes. (København, Niels W. Gade Works/Werke VI:2a + 2b/J. P. E. Hartmann Udvalgte Værker/Selected Works/Ausgevählte Werke IV:2, 2009, I-XLVI + 165 pp. + 163 s. & 363 pp., folio, ill., ISBN 87-90230-18-3 (volume 1), ISBN 87-90230-19-1 (volume 2), ISMN 979-0-706763-11-8 (volumes 1-2)).
- Jürgensen, Knud Arne: Bifald og Bølgebryder. Frederik Schybergs teaterkritik. En antologi. Udgivet og kommenteret af Knud Arne Jürgensen (Odense, Syddansk Universitetsforlag, 2009, I-XX + 382 pp., ill., ISBN 978-87-7674-421-2
- Jürgensen, Knud Arne: Teatrets fortællinger. Jens Kistrups teaterkritik. En Antologi. Udgivet og kommenteret af Knud Arne Jürgensen (Odense, Syddansk Universitetsforlag, 2013, I-XL + 484 pp., ill., ISBN 978-87-7674-642-1
- Jürgensen, Knud Arne (ed.) : Il Valdemaro, Dramma per musica di Domenico Sarro (1726). Edizione critica a cura di Knud Arne Jürgensen. Roma, Analecta Romana Instituti Danici Supplementum XLIII. Edizione Quasar di Severino Tognon srl., juli 2013, Orchestral score, introduction, critical report, ill., LXXX + 605 pp., ISBN 978-88-7140-517-9
- Jürgensen, Knud Arne : Mandarinen Flemming Flindt - et teaterliv. Under medvirken af Vivi Flindt. (Copenhagen, Gyldendal, 2019, 468 pp., ill., ISBN 978-87-02-27737-1

== Honours ==
In 2005 Jürgensen was awarded the Italian Order of Knights Cavaliere della Repubblica Italiana (OSSI, 30.5.2005) by the President of the Italian Republic, Carlo Azeglio Ciampi.

He has also received a number of Danish and international grants and awards, among others The Verdi Prize (Premio Giuseppe Verdi) in 1989, Balletmaster Hans Beck's Memorial Award in 1998, Dance Perspective's The Lillian Moore Prize Award in 1999, and Her Majesty Queen Ingrid's Roman Grant for membership of the Danish Academy in Rome which he has been awarded three times.

== External references ==
- Knud Arne Jürgensen's danish wikipedia-site.
- Knud Arne Jürgensen's personal homepage.
- Biography in Danish about Knud Arne Jürgensen in the paper Politiken on July 8, 2012.
- Biography in Danish about Knud Arne Jürgensen in the paper Kristeligt Dagblad on July 7, 2012.
