= Valvoja =

Finnish cultural magazine (1880–1922)

- Editor: Helmi Krohn; Thiodolf Rein
- Categories: Cultural magazine
- Founded: 1880
- Final issue: 1922
- Country: Finland
- Language: Finnish

Valvoja (Finnish: Observer) was a Finnish language literary and cultural magazine that existed between 1880 and 1922.

== History and profile ==
Valvoja was launched in 1880 by a group of individuals who would become prominent academics and politicians, including Arvid Järnefelt and Ernst Gustaf Palmen. The magazine was significantly influenced by a Danish magazine, Tilskueren. The founding group adhered to classical liberalism and supported the ideas of John Stuart Mill and Charles Darwin. However, the magazine editors did not endorse naturalism.

Helmi Krohn and Thiodolf Rein served as the editors-in-chief of the magazine. Juhani Aho, who was one of the early professional Finnish language authors, contributed to the magazine. Another contributor was a member of Young Finns, Yrjö Koskelainen. Valvoja was instrumental in reintroducing the views of Anders Chydenius who was among the pioneers of liberalism in Sweden and Finland.

The magazine ceased publication in 1922.
