= Liva Järnefelt =

Swedish opera singer (1876–1971)

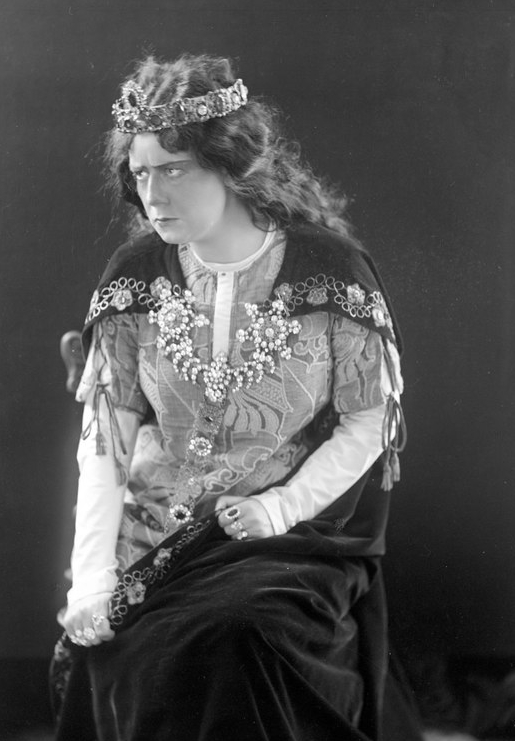
- Järnefelt as Ortrud in Lohengrin at the Royal Swedish Opera (1905)
- Born: Olivia Edström; 18 March 1878; Vänersborg, Sweden
- Died: 24 June 1971 (aged 93); Engelbrekt Parish, Stockholm County, Sweden
- Education: Royal Swedish Academy of Music
- Occupation: Operatic mezzo-soprano
- Organization: Royal Swedish Opera
- Awards: Litteris et Artibus

Olivia (Liva) Järnefelt née Edström (18 March 1876 – 24 June 1971) was a Swedish mezzo-soprano who specialized in opera. In 1897, after appearing at the Royal Swedish Opera as the Third Boy in Mozart's The Magic Flute and making her actual debut as Pantalis in Boito's Mefistofele, she remained with the company until 1926. She performed major roles in several Wagnerian operas as well as in a variety of Italian works. On the occasion of her 25th anniversary with the Royal Opera, she was enthusiastically acclaimed for her performance in the title role of Bizet's Carmen. Appreciated by both her audiences and critics for her clear, full-bodied voice and her outstanding stagecraft, she was awarded the Litteris et Artibus in 1920.

== Early life, family and education ==
Born on 18 March 1878 in Vänersborg, Olivia Edström was the daughter of Chancellor Johan Edström and his wife Maria née Nordqvist. Her younger sister, Anna Edström (1884–1940), also became an opera singer. From 1894 to 1897, she studied voice at the Royal Swedish Academy of Music under Julius Günther. She later studied further under Gillis Bratt in Stockholm (1904–94) and August Iffert in Vienna. She also studied drama under Signe Hebbe. In 1910, she married the Finnish conductor and composer Armas Järnefelt.

== Career ==
Edström first appeared on stage at the Royal Opera in 1897 as the Third Boy in Mozart's The Magic Flute. That year she made her official debut as Pantalis in Boito's Mefistofele and also appeared as Frédéric in Mignon by Ambroise Thomas. In 1898, she was engaged by the company and performed there until 1926.

She gained popularity in 1901, singing the title role in Bizet's Carmen. She subsequently sang in several Wagnerian operas: Venus in Tannhäuser, Ortrud in Lohengrin, Magdalena in Die Meistersinger von Nürnberg, Brangâne in Tristan und Isolde, Brünnhilde and Fricka in Der Ring des Nibelungen and Kundry in Parsifal. Roles in Italian operas included Azucena in Verdi's Il trovatore, Marcellina in Rossini's The Barber of Seville, Maddalena in Verdi's Rigoletto, Hedwige in Rossini's William Tell and Lola in Mascagni's Cavalleria rusticana. She is remembered in particular for singing the title role in Samson and Delilah Saint-Saëns, premiered in 1903, for Amneris in Verdi's Aida, Olga in Tchaikovsky's Eugene Onegin, and in particular for her Carmen, which she last performed to celebrate her 25th anniversary with the company. Initially overshadowed by Matilda Jungstedt's Carmen, she increasingly earned the acclaim of her audiences and critics.

Towards the end of her stage career, Järnefelt often appeared in comic roles such as Annina in Der Rosenkavalier by Richard Strauss, and Quickly in Verdi's Falstaff, receiving praise from her critics for making so much of these smaller roles. She later became a respected voice and drama teacher in Stockholm.

Liva Järnefelt died on 24 June 1971 in Engelbrekt Parish in Stockholm County.

== Awards ==
Järnefelt was awarded the Litteris et Artibus medal in 1920 for her contributions to Swedish culture. In 1924 she was elected a member of the Royal Swedish Academy of Music.
