= Selim Palmgren =

Finnish composer, pianist, and conductor (1878–1951)

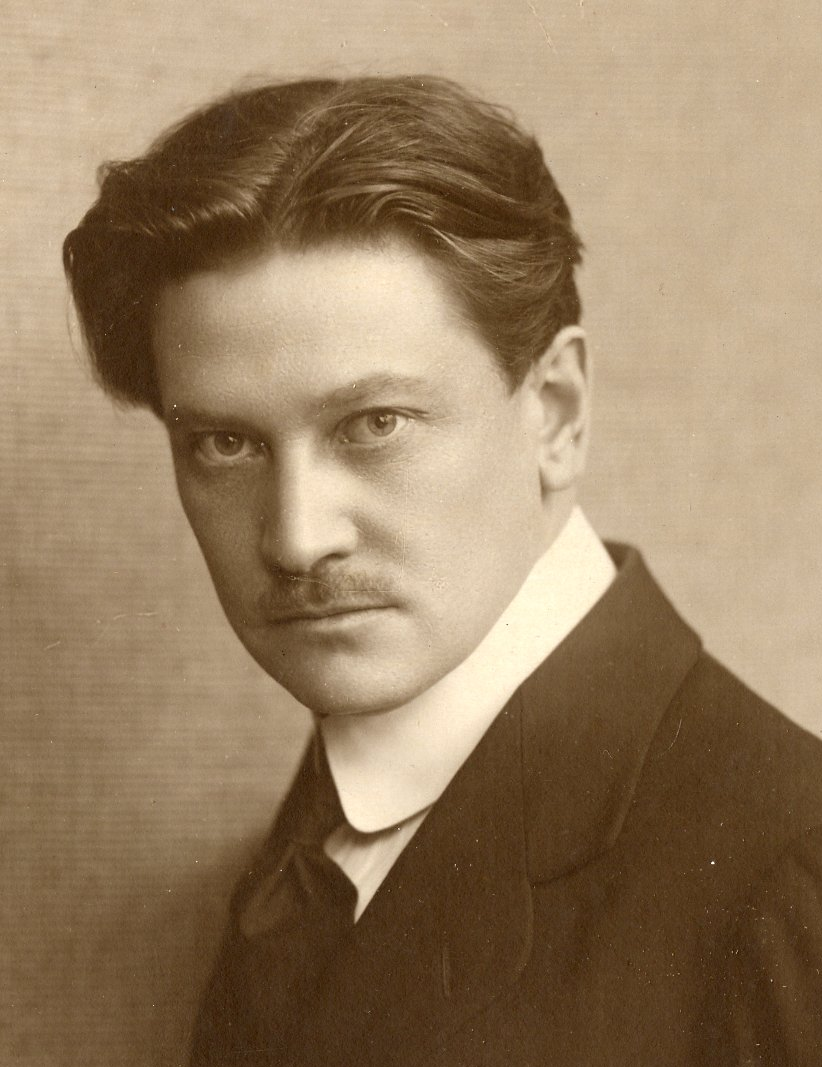
Palmgren (c. 1917)

Selim Gustaf Adolf Palmgren (16 February 1878 – 13 December 1951) was a Finnish composer, pianist, and conductor. Palmgren was born in Pori, Finland, February 16, 1878. He studied at the Conservatory in Helsinki from 1895 to 1899, then continued his piano studies in Berlin with Conrad Ansorge, Wilhelm Berger and Ferruccio Busoni. He conducted choral and orchestral societies in his own country and made several very successful concert tours as a pianist in the principal cities of Finland and Scandinavia, appearing also as a visiting conductor. In 1921, he went to the United States, where he taught composition at the Eastman School of Music, later returning to Finland, where he died in Helsinki, aged 73. Palmgren was married to the opera singer Maikki Järnefelt, who had been divorced from her first husband, Armas Järnefelt, in 1908, from 1910 to her death in 1929.

== Works listed by opus number ==
An incomplete works list (elaborated by Joel Valkila):

- Op. 1 - Prelude, Illusion, & Etude and Valse-Caprice for Piano (1898?' Illusion later arranged for orchestra)
- Op. 2(a) - Two Songs (reference: T. Tommila) (1898?)
- Op. 2(b) - 3 Pieces for Piano (1898?)
- Op. 3 - Suite for Piano (1899?)
- Op. 4 - 3 Piano Pieces (1900?)
- Op. 5 - 2 Songs (1901)
- Op. 6 - Fantasie for Piano (1901)
- Op. 7 - Den Unge Piges Viser, Song Cycle for Voice & Piano (1901)
- Op. 8(a) - Lyric Intermezzo, a suite for Piano (1900)
- Op. 8(b) - Pieces for Violin and Piano
- Op. 9 - En Route, Concert Study for Piano (1901)
- Op. 10 - Impromptu and Scherzo for Piano (1901)
- Op. 11 - Piano Sonata in D minor (1901)
- Op. 12 - 2 Songs (1901/06?) (the first song is lost)
- Op. 13 - Piano Concerto No.1 in G minor (1904)
- Op. 14 - Barcarolle for Piano (1906?)
- Op. 15 - 3 Songs (1906?)
- Op. 16(_) - Menuet in Folk-Style (Menuett i folkton) for Piano (Piano solo version of Op.24 No.2)
- Op. 16(a) - 4 Songs (reference: T. Tommila) (1904/03/01/02; no.4 later arranged for piano solo in 1906?)
- Op. 16(b) - 4 Songs (reference: T. Tommila) (1905/02/02?/02)
- Op. 17 - 24 Preludes for Piano (1907?)
- Op. 18 - Ballad with Theme and Variations for Piano (1906?)
- Op. 19 - 5 Songs (1894)
- Op. 20 - 3 Songs (1907?)
- Op. 21 - Incidental Music, "Cinderella" (reference: T. Tommila) (1903' various extracts arranged for piano solo in 1904, 1907, and 1908)
- Op. 22 - Finnish Lyrics, 12 Pieces for Piano (1901-4)
- Op. 23 - Organ Pieces (reference: T. Tommila) (1908?)
- Op. 24 - Aus Finnland, 4 Symphonic Pieces for Orchestra (1904?; later arranged for piano)
- Op. 25 - 3 Songs (reference: T. Tommila) (1901?/2; no.3 later arranged for piano solo in 1906?)
- Op. 26 - 3 Humoresques for Piano (1908?)
- Op. 27 - 7 Klavierstücke, "Spring" (1906-7?)
- Op. 28 - 6 Lyric Pieces "Youth" for Piano (1909)
- Op. 29 - 2 "Contrasts" for piano (1913)
- Op. 30 - Opera "Daniel Hjort" (1910, rev. 1938)
- Op. 31 - 5 Sketches from Finland for Piano (1911?)
- Op. 32 - 3 Klavierstücke (1912?)
- Op. 33 - Piano Concerto No.2 ("Der Fluss" or "The River") (1913)
- Op. 34(a) - 2 Kleine Balletszenen for Piano (1913?)
- Op. 34(b) - 2 Songs (reference: T. Tommila) (1912/3)
- Op. 35 - 4 Klavierskizzen for Piano (1913?)
- Op. 36 - The Masquerade for Two Pianos (1913?; later arranged for piano solo in 1923?)
- Op. 37(a) - Mephistowaltzer (1913?)
- Op. 37(b)- Song 'Nocturne'
- Op. 38 - Dunkelrote Rosen and Klage für eine Singstimme und Klavier (1913-4?)
- Op. 39 - Nordischer Sommer - 5 Piano Pieces (1913)
- Op. 40 - "Die Stadt" for Voice and Orchestra (reference: T. Tommila) (1913-4?' 1st version of Op.41b)
- Op. 41(a) - Piano Concerto No.3 "Metamorphoses" (1916)
- Op. 41(b) - Song 'Die Stadt' for Voice and Orchestra (1914)(2nd version of Op.40)
- Op. 42 - Ballade "Torpflickan" for Solo Voices, Choir and Orchestra (reference: T. Tommila) (1914)
- Op. 43 - 4 Morceaux for Violin & Piano (1915?)
- Op. 44 - 3 Songs (1913-4?)
- Op. 45 - 3 Piano Pieces, Op.45 (1915?)
- Op. 46 - Exotisk Marsch for Piano (1915; later arranged for orchestra in 1938?)
- Op. 47 - "Spring", 6 Piano Pieces (1915?)
- Op. 48 - 2 Songs for Voice & Piano (1915?)
- Op. 49(a) - 4 Piano Pieces ('Längtansvals och andra klaverstycken') (1915?)
- Op. 49(b) - Rondo a Capriccio for Piano (Same as Op. 53; reference: T. Tommila) (1916?)
- Op. 50 - A Pastoral in 3 Scenes, Suite for Piano / Orchestra (1918?, later arranged for orchestra in 1920?; a piano version of No.2 is not extant, but Op.49b and Op.53 are arrangements of the orchestral version of it)
- Op. 51 - Light and Shade - 6 Piano Pieces ('Ljus och skugga') (1919?)
- Op. 52 - 3 Songs (1915?)
- Op. 53 - Rondo a capriccio for Piano ('Bacchanale') (reference: T. Tommila) - Same as Op. 49b! (1916?)
- Op. 54 - 3 Pianostycken (1918?)
- Op. 55 - Song ('O moder') for Voice & Piano (+cello ad lib.) (reference: T. Tommila) (1915?)
- Op. 56 - 3 Songs (1916?)
- Op. 57 - 3 Piano Pieces (Morceaux) (1917?)
- Op. 58(a) - Incidental Music from the Play "Juhana Herttua" (Op 62?)
- Op. 58(b) - Song (reference: T. Tommila)
- Op. 59(a) - 'Julkvällen' (Christmas Eve) for Choir and Orchestra
- Op. 59(b) - Songs (reference: T. Tommila)
- Op. 60 - Three Songs
- Op. 61 - 'Kaunehin Maa' ("The Most Beautiful Land") - for Male Choir and Brass
- Op. 62 - Incidental Music from the Play "Juhana Herttua"
- Op. 63 - Four Impromptus for Piano
- Op. 64(a) - Piano Pieces "Klanger och Rytmer"
- Op. 64(b) - "Ivy" and "Bagpipes" for Piano (reference: T. Tommila)
- Op. 65 - Intermezzo valsant for Piano
- Op. 66 - Deux impromptus for Piano (1919?)
- Op. 67(a) - Hakkapeliittojen marssi for Voices (in unison) and Piano("March of the Finnish Soldiers in the 30 Years' War") (1919?)
- Op. 67(b) - 6 Morceaux for Piano (1920?)
- Op. 68 - Incidental Music to the Play "The Sacrifice of Kaleva" (reference: T. Tommila) (1918-9)
- Op. 69 - Finnish Folk Tunes for Piano (reference: T. Tommila) (1920?; first six published in the folk song collection, Soumalaisia Kansanlauluja
- Op. 70(a) - Two Choruses (reference: T. Tommila) (1920?; later arranged for voice and piano) (choir version of No.1, Var är vägens mål, is lost)
- Op. 70(b) - Graciosa rytmer for Piano ("Graceful Rhythms")(reference: T. Tommila) (1921?)
- Op. 71 - Fog Figures, Three Piano Pieces (1920?)
- Op. 72(a) - Nocturne in Three Scenes for Piano (1921?)
- Op. 72(b) - 12 Nordic Folk Songs (reference: T. Tommila) (1921?)
- Op. 73 - 3 Piano Pieces (1920?)
- Op. 74 - 3 Morceaux for Piano (1922?)
- Op. 75 - 8 Piano Pieces (1922?)
- Op. 76 - 6 Piano Pieces (1922?)
- Op. 77 - 24 Studies for Piano (1921-2?)
- Op. 78 - Compositions for Violin and Piano (1922?)
- Op. 79 - 10 Piano Pieces (1922?)
- Op. 80 - 2 Pieces for Cello and Piano (1922?)
- Op. 81 - Triptych (1924?)
- Op. 82 - 3 Fantasier for Piano (1925?)
- Op. 83 - Three Piano Pieces (1926?)
- Op. 84 – 3 Piano Pieces (Preludes) (1927?)
- Op. 85 - Piano Concerto No.4 ("April") (1926)
- Op. 86 - Cantata "For Fatherland's Freedom" for Choir (and Orchestra ad lib.) (1928)
- Op. 87 - 5 New Piano Sketches (1928?, published 1928 by Fazer)
- Op. 88 - 4 Piano Pieces (1935?)
- Op. 89 - Cantata for the 700th Anniversary of the City of Turku for Choir, Soprano solo, and Orchestra (reference: T. Tommila) (1929; in 6 parts)
- Op. 90 - 2 Choruses (reference: T. Tommila) (1931?)
- Op. 91 - 2 Songs (reference: T. Tommila) (1940?; both arranged for choir a capella) (the second song is lost)
- Op. 92 - Sotilaspolka for Voice and Orchestra (1941?)
- Op. 93 - 2 Piano Pieces (1934)
  - Op. 93(a) - Sonatine (No.1) in F major for Piano
  - Op. 93(b) - Festpräludium for Piano
- Op. 94 - Four Songs (1944?; No.1 later arranged for voice and orchestra)
- Op. 95 - En sällsam fågel for Voice and Orchestra (1936; after Op.44 No.2)
- Op. 96 - "Music for a Comedy Play" for Orchestra (reference: T. Tommila) (1937; music to an unidentified play)
- Op. 97 - Pakkanen for Voice and Orchestra (1937)
- Op. 98 - 2 Songs (1939–42)
  - Op. 98(a) - 'Vanhojen Messujen Aikaan' ("At the Times of the Ancient Masses") for Male Choir and Orchestra
  - Op. 98(b) - "Song of the Quild" for Choir a capella (reference: T. Tommila)
- Op. 99 - Piano Concerto No.5 (1940)
- Op. 100 - Nouskohon Sukuni Suuri (Let My Great Nation Rise) for Choir and Orchestra (1942)
- Op. 101 - 4 Choruses (reference: T. Tommila)
- Op. 102 - Sun & Clouds, 12 Pieces for Piano (1942?)
- Op. 103(a) - Jouluaatto ("Christmas Morning") for Chorus and Orchestra (reference: T. Tommila) (1942)
- Op. 103(b) - Cantata for the 500th anniversary of the Town of Naantali (1943; in 5 parts)
- Op. 104 - Concert-Fantasy for Violin and Orchestra (1945?)
- Op. 105 - Ballet Scenes, Six Pieces for Piano (originally for orchestra) (1944?)
- Op. 106 - 3 Songs (1944?)
- Op. 107 - 5 Choruses (1944?)
- Op. 108 - Ballade for Orchestra (reference: T. Tommila) (1942; after Op.85)
- Op. 109 - Piano Suite "Diary Sheets" (reference: T. Tommila) (1944?)
- Op. 110 - Höst på berget for Voice and Piano (1946?) (reference: T. Tommila)
- Op. 111 - Minusta tuli muusikko (I Became a Musician), Autobiography (1948; in Finnish)
- Op. 112 - Cantata Väinämöinen ja karhunkaato for Choir, Orchestra, and Baritone Solo (1949) (reference: T. Tommila)
- Op. 113 - Sonatine (No.2) in D major for Piano (1950)
- Op. 114 - Op.114/1 "a Gaspar Cassado" / "Violoncello (Andante con moto)- Repertoire de Gaspar Cassado" for Cello and Piano / Op 114/2 In tempo di minuetto (reference: T. Tommila) (1951?)

== Works listed without a known opus number, in alphabetic order ==
- Op posth. – Aftonpsalm for Chorus (reference: T. Tommila)
- Op posth. – Allegretto for Piano (1921) (reference: T. Tommila)
- Op posth. – Allhelgonenatt for Male Choir (reference: T. Tommila)
- Op posth. – Anna-mi (Song)(reference: T. Tommila)
- Op posth. – Arabeske (1946) for Piano
- Op posth. – Arabeski (1896) for Piano (reference: T. Tommila)
- Op posth. – Asparnas susning (Song)(reference: T. Tommila)
- Op posth. – Aurinkokaupunki for Chorus (reference: T. Tommila)
- Op posth. – Bagatelle for Piano (reference: T. Tommila)
- Op posth. – Berceuse for Piano
- Op posth. – Berceuse (1895) for Piano
- Op posth. – Berceuse (1917) for Violin and Piano (reference: T. Tommila)
- Op posth. – Björkarna där hemma for Male Choir (reference: T. Tommila)
- Op posth. – Bort allt vad oro gör for Male Choir (reference: T. Tommila)
- Op posth. – Bottniska hav (reference: T. Tommila)
- Op posth. – Brudefärden (reference: T. Tommila)
- Op posth. – Cavatina for Violin and Piano (lost?)(reference: T. Tommila)
- Op posth. – Chanson elegiaque for Violin and Piano (reference: T. Tommila)
- Op posth. – Chant d'automne (1917) for Cello and Piano (reference: T. Tommila)
- Op posth. – Clarinet Concerto (unfinished)(reference: T. Tommila)
- Op posth. – Con sordino for Piano
- Op posth. – Concert-Etude ("Konsertetude")(1906)(reference: T. Tommila)
- Op posth. – Country dance / Musette / The Bagpipe for Piano (1922)(reference: T. Tommila)
- Op posth. – Cry for Help (1927) for Chorus (reference: T. Tommila)
- Op posth. – Dag efter dag for Voice and Piano (reference: T. Tommila)
- Op posth. – Darthulas gravsång for Male Choir (reference: T. Tommila)
- Op posth. – 'De Fallna' ("The Fallen Ones"), Song (1919)
- Op posth. – De heliga änglar for Chorus (1933)(reference: T. Tommila)
- Op posth. – De vita scholastica for Voice and Piano (reference: T. Tommila)
- Op posth. – Den långa dagen for Voice and Piano (reference: T. Tommila)
- Op posth. – Den övergivna for Voice and Piano (reference: T. Tommila)
- Op posth. – 'Drömmen' ("Dream") for Choir (1898)
- Op posth. – Drömvisa for Piano (1921)(reference: T. Tommila)
- Op posth. – 'En Idyll' for Choir
- Op posth. – Ensimmäinen perhonen ("The First Butterfly") for Piano (reference: T. Tommila)
- Op posth. – Entre'acte valsant for Piano (reference: T. Tommila)
- Op posth. – 'Erotus mielillä' ("Thinking of the Depart") for Choir (1900)
- Op posth. – Etude for Piano (1896)("unfinished")(reference: T. Tommila)
- Op posth. – Etude ("Gnistor") for Piano
- Op posth. – Etude de Concert for Piano (c.1900)
- Op posth. – Finnish Caprice for Piano (1922)(reference: T. Tommila)
- Op posth. – 'Helsinki Oldboys Regement' March for Piano
- Op posth. – Intermezzo (1895) for Piano
- Op posth. – Intermezzo Marziale for Orchestra (arrangement of Op.47 No.4?)
- Op posth. – 'Keijukaiset' ("Fairies") for Piano
- Op posth. – 'Kevätauerta' for Piano
- Op posth. – 'Lullaby for Wounded Hearts' for Orchestra (orchestral adaption from a piano piece in Op 81?)
- Op posth. – Musette for Orchestra
- Op posth. – Overture for Piano (1934) – same as Op 93b! (Re-published as a "posthumous" work in 1982)
- Op posth. – 'Pieni legenda' ("A Small Legend")(1895) for Piano
- Op posth. – Prélude funebre for Piano
- Op posth. – Preludietto for Piano
- Op posth. – Presto for Piano (reference: T. Tommila)
- Op posth. – Romance for Violin and Piano (1917)
- Op posth. – Scherzino (1894) for Piano (reference: T. Tommila)
- Op posth. – Serenad for Piano (reference: T. Tommila)
- Op posth. – 'Solsken genom tårar' ("Sunshine Through the Tears")(1946) for Piano
- Op posth. – 'Spinnrocken' for Piano
- Op posth. – 'Syysprologi' ("An Autumnal Prologue") for Piano
- Op posth. – Titania for Male Choir (reference: T. Tommila)
- Op posth. – Ungarischer Tanz for Piano
- Op posth. – Valkokaarti ("The White Guard") for Vocal and Piano
- Op posth. – 'Valssi länsisuomalaiseen tapaan' ("Waltz in a Western Finnish Style") for Piano
- Without Opus – Aria (1904) for Piano (reference: T. Tommila)
- Without Opus – Berceuse for Piano (by 1919)
- Without Opus – Finnische kabinettstücke (7 Piano Pieces) (by 1923)
- Without Opus – Gavotte and Musette for Piano (by 1919)
- Without Opus – 'Grave of Chopin for Piano' and Orchestra
- Without Opus – Intermezzo for left hand only (1906)
- Without Opus – Northern Folk Songs
- Without Opus – Romance for Violin and Piano (1917)
- Without Opus – Scherzo (1893) for Piano
- Without Opus – Finnish Folk Songs for Piano (possibly Op.69?)
- Without Opus – 'Vårbräckarnas brus' ("Russtles of Spring") for Piano

According to a biography on a June 1926 Gramophone article, Palmgren had written two operas at that time, one produced (Daniel Hjort) and another one unproduced. As far as it is known, Palmgren never produced the other one.

A detailed works list in preparation (in Finnish) can be found here: Preliminary List of Compositions by Selim Palmgren.
