= Axel Jungstedt =

Swedish painter

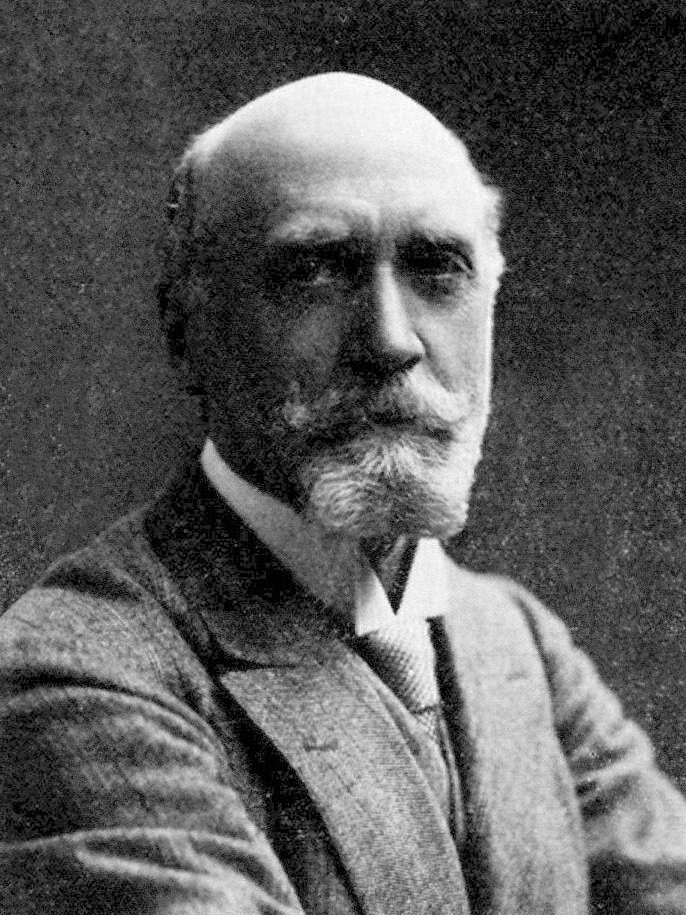
- Born: 17 March 1859; Norrköping, Sweden
- Died: 14 March 1933 (aged 73); Stockholm, Sweden
- Occupation: Painter
- Relatives: Matilda Jungstedt (sister)
- Awards: Litteris et Artibus (1999)

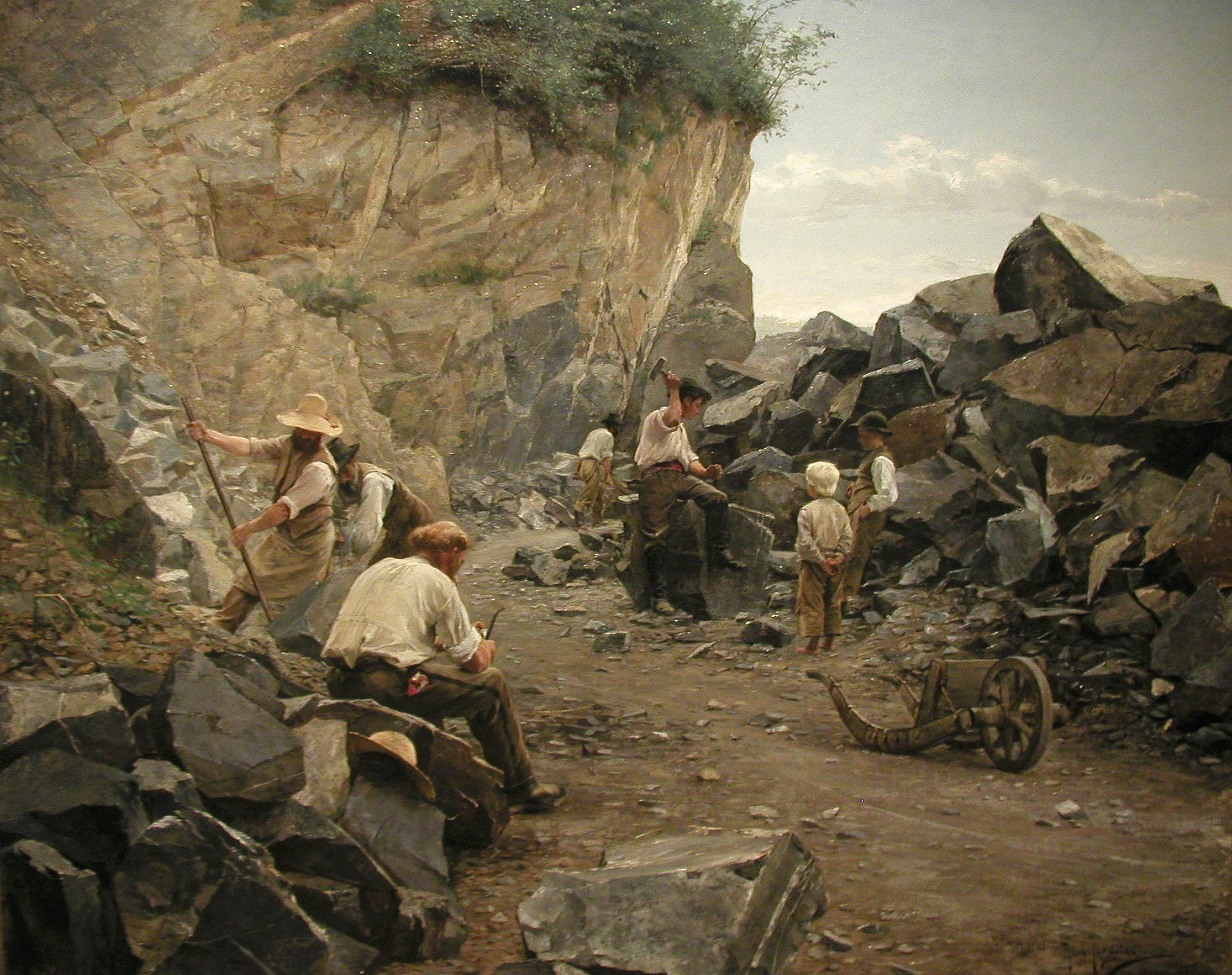
In the Quarry. Motif from Switzerland (1886) Nationalmuseum

Axel Adolf Harald Jungstedt (17 March 1859 – 14 March 1933) was a Swedish painter and professor at the Royal Swedish Academy of Arts. He is represented with paintings at the Gothenburg Art Museum, the National Gallery of Denmark, and the National Gallery of Norway, and contributed with decorations of the Stockholm Opera House.

== Biography ==
Axel Adolf Harald Jungstedt was born on 17 March 1859 in Norrköping in Östergötland, Sweden, the son of Johan Nils Jungstedt and Matilda Sundius. He was the brother of opera singer Matilda Jungstedt.

Jungstedt studied with Edvard Perséus at the Royal Swedish Academy of Fine Arts from 1878 to 1883. After completing his studies, he made study trips on academy scholarship from 1884–1888 to Italy, Germany and Switzerland. In Paris, he studied with William-Adolphe Bouguereau (1825–1905). He made summer trips to Switzerland in 1886 and 1887. He lived for some time in Munich and also visited Dresden and Berlin.

In 1888 he was again in Stockholm and opened his own painting school which he operated until 1896. His students included Emerik Stenberg and Elsa Beskow. He was awarded Litteris et Artibus in 1899. He was appointed professor at the Royal Swedish Academy of Arts from 1909 to 1925.

In the 1890s he received his first portrait order. In 1892, he performed altarpieces for Norra Vings Church and Sura Church and 1905 for Vederslöv Church and in 1925 for Storkyrkoförsamlingen in Stockholm. Among his other works was the decoration of the Stockholm Opera House. His art is on display at the Gothenburg Art Museum and the National Gallery of Denmark in Copenhagen.

He is represented at the National Gallery of Norway with the painting Dannemora gruver from 1890.

== Gallery ==
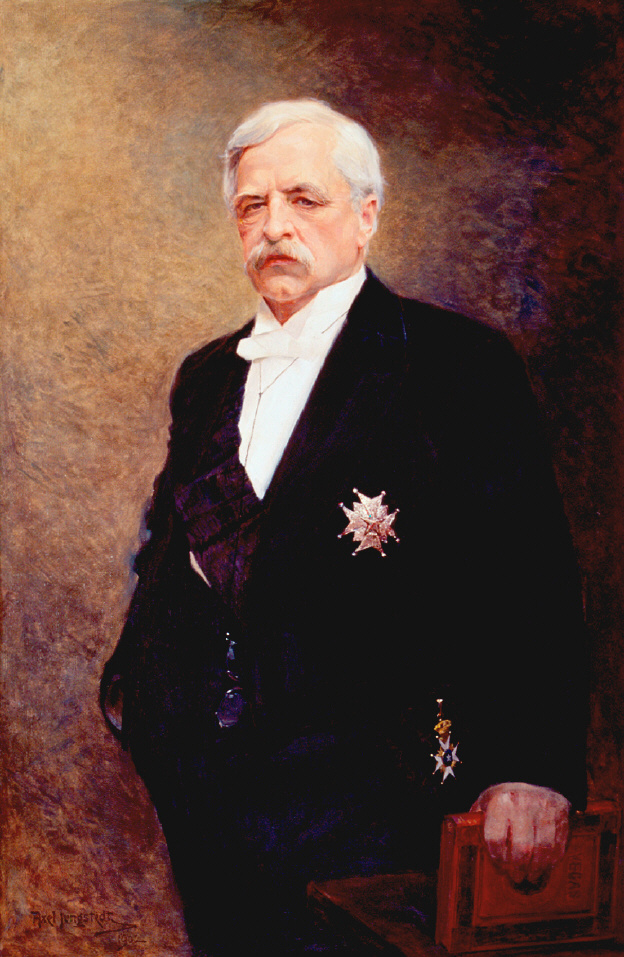
Adolf Erik Nordenskiöld (1902)

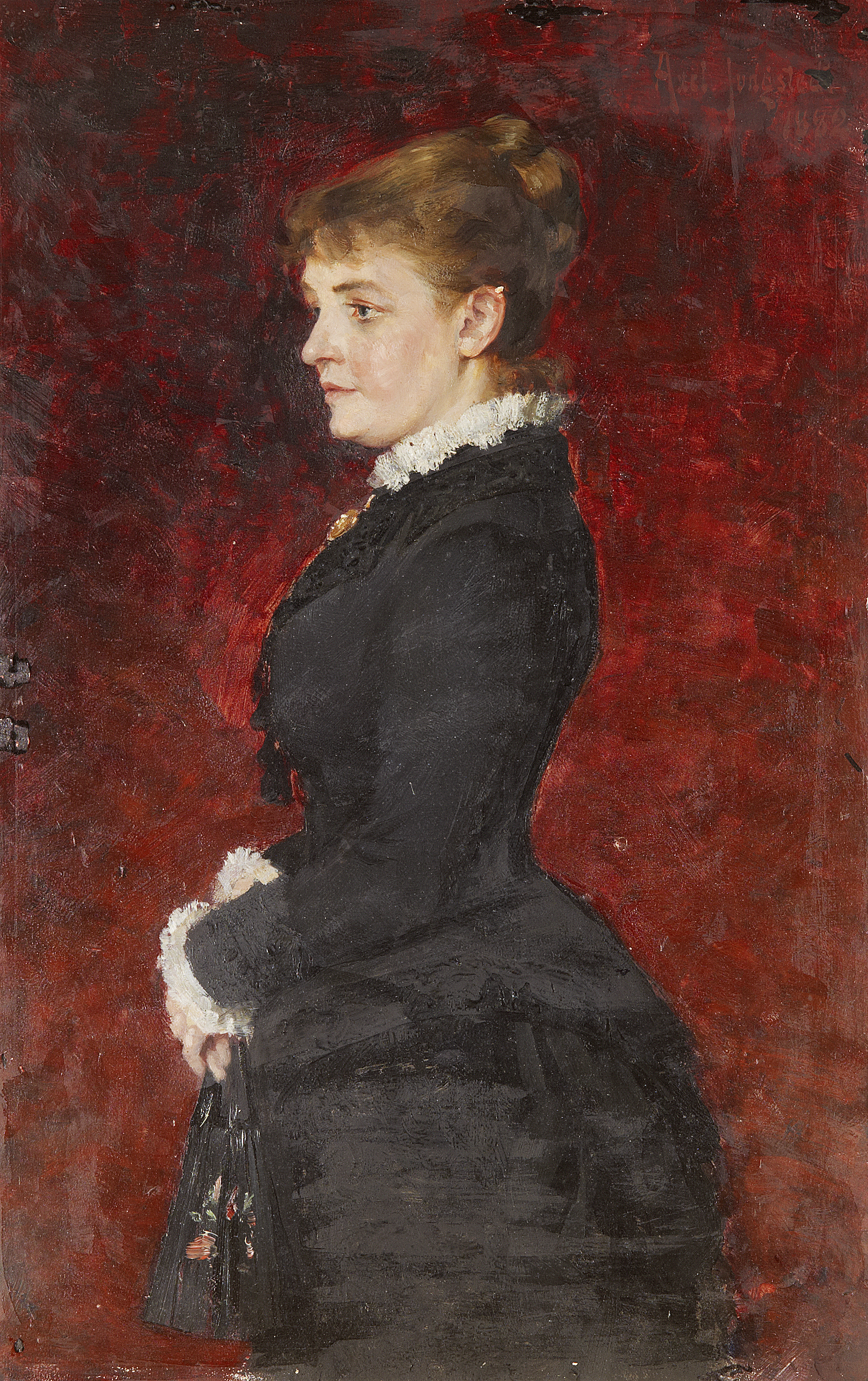
Lady in a Black Dress (1882)

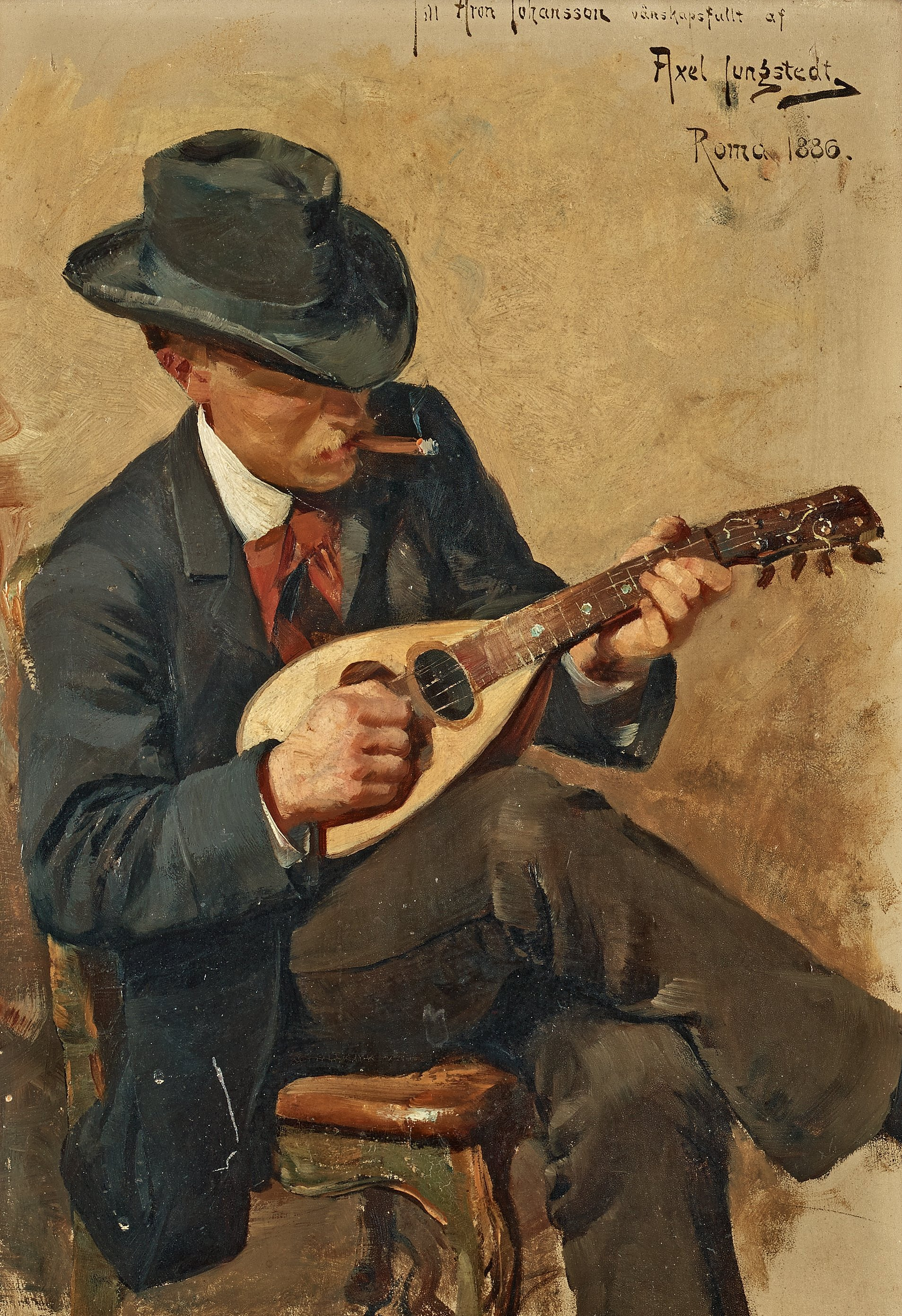
Portrait of Architect Aron Johansson (1886)
