= Yrjö Koskelainen =

Finnish journalist, writer, business executive and politician (1885–1951)

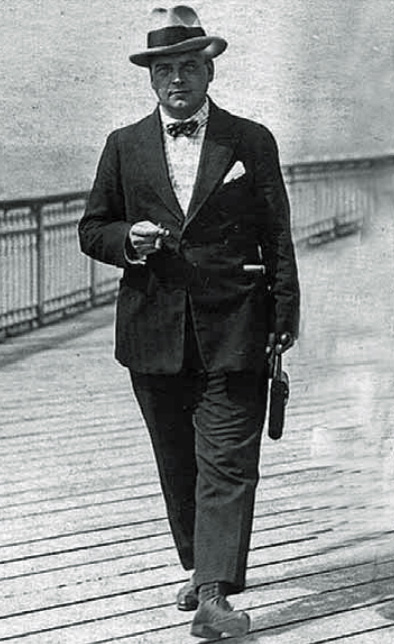
Yrjö Koskelainen

Yrjö Koskelainen (23 April 1885 – 30 April 1951) was a Finnish journalist, writer, business executive and politician, born in Helsinki. Koskelainen began his political career in the Young Finnish Party. He was a member of the Parliament of Finland from 1931 to 1933, representing the National Coalition Party. He was a presidential elector in the 1937, 1940 and 1943 presidential elections.

Koskelainen was a contributor to Finnish language literary and cultural magazine Valvoja.
