= Alexander Järnefelt =

Finnish general, topographist, and politician

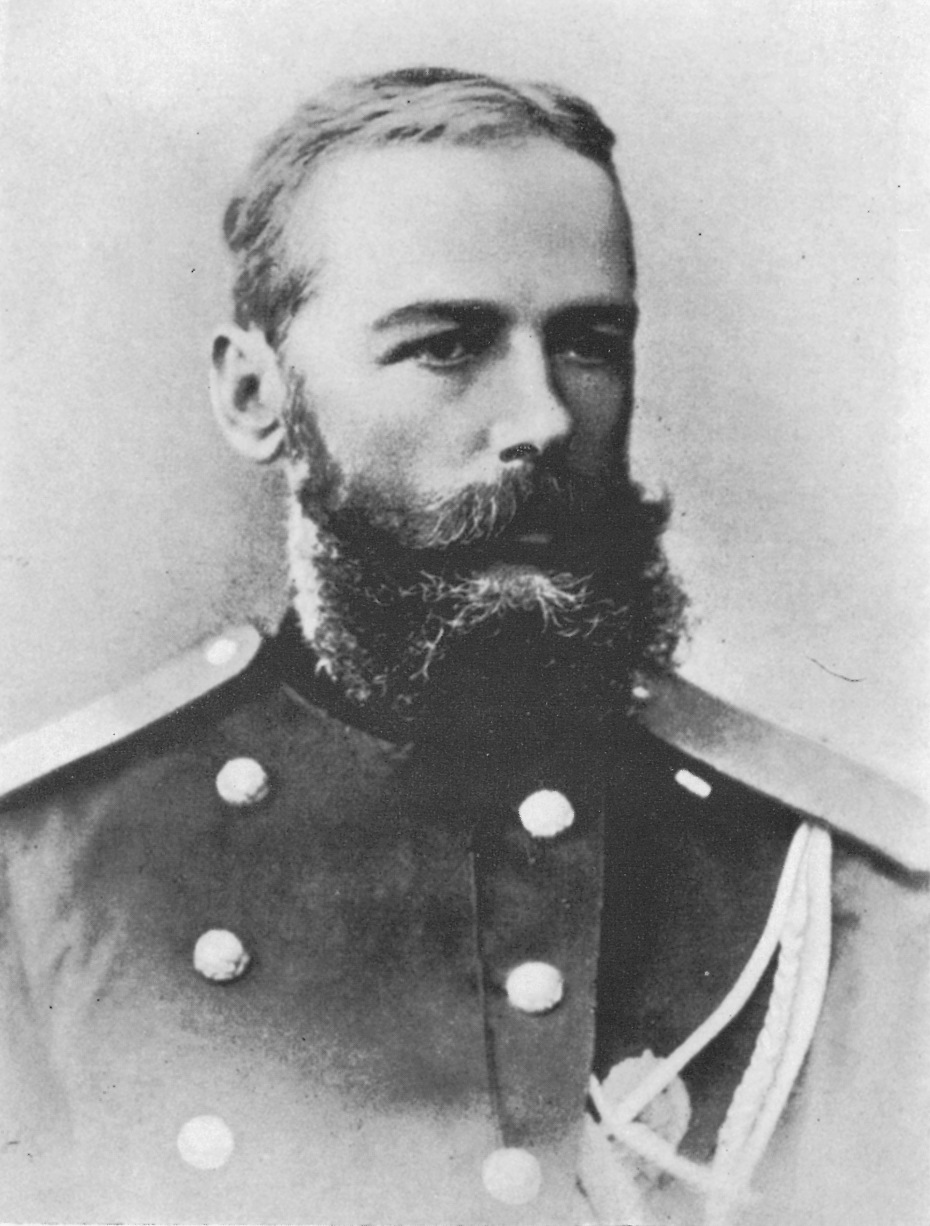
Alexander Järnefelt in military uniform.

August Alexander Järnefelt (2 April 1833 – 15 April 1896) was a Finnish general, topographist, governor and senator.

== Early life ==
Aleksander Järnefelt was born in Tohmajärvi, the son of crown overseer Gustav Adolf Järnefelt and Aurora Fredrika Molander. Aleksander married Elisabeth Clodt von Jürgensburg on 22 December 1857 in Saint Petersburg. Their children were Kasper, Arvid, Erik, Ellida, Ellen, Armas, Aino, Hilja and Sigrid. Armas, Arvid and Eero were famous Finnish cultural figures. Aino Järnefelt was married to composer Jean Sibelius.

== Military life ==
After seven year's study in Hamina Cadet School, Järnefelt embarked on a career as an artillery officer in the Russian Army. After working under Wilhelm von Struve at Pulkovo Observatory, Järnefelt was commanded to topographic works in his native Finland which formed his main occupation for decades. By 1870, he was the head of the Russian topographic corps in Finland.

During and after the Turkish war (1877–1879), Järnefelt led the topographic survey of many areas which Russia conquered from Turkey. These works, on which he also wrote a German-language scientific treatise Die astronomischen, geodätischen und topographischen Arbeiten auf der Balkanhalbinsel in der Jahren 1877, 1878 und 1879, earned him a promotion to general major.

== Statesmanship ==
In the 1880s, Järnefelt was transferred from the military to a civilian administrative career, which allowed him to further his political agenda. Järnefelt was the governor of Mikkeli Province in the 1883–84, the governor of Kuopio Province in 1884–88 and Vaasa Province in 1888–94. During these tenures, Järnefelt used his gubernatorial powers to change the language of civil administration of these provinces to Finnish (in the bilingual Vaasa Province, to bilingualism). In addition, he strove to establish primary schools and poor-houses in his provinces.

Järnefelt's career culminated in the membership of the Senate of Finland, where Järnefelt was tasked as the chief of the military affair's section. The promotion to senator was accompanied with promotion to the rank of a lieutenant general. Järnefelt died at Helsinki on 15 April 1896, of paralysis.

Politically, Järnefelt was a fennoman of the Old Finnish Party. The party strove for the equal rights of Finnish language with the Swedish while stressing the importance of loyalty to the Emperor. Järnefelt took these aims seriously, sending his children to Finnish-speaking schools which was extraordinary for a nobleman of his time.
