= Maikki Järnefelt =

Finnish opera singer (1871–1929)

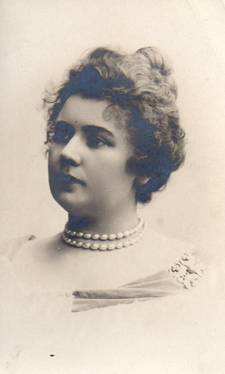

Background information
- Birth name: Maria Pakarinen
- Born: 26 August 1871; Joensuu, Grand Duchy of Finland
- Died: 4 July 1929 (aged 57); Turku, Finland
- Genres: Opera

Maria 'Maikki' Järnefelt-Palmgren (née Pakarinen; 1871—1929) was an internationally-recognised Finnish operatic soprano and singing pedagogue, who toured extensively around Europe. She is especially known as a Wagnerian and Lied singer.

Maria Pakarinen's first marriage was to the composer and conductor, Prof. Armas Järnefelt (m. 1893 — div. 1908), with whom she had a child. She later married the composer, conductor and pianist, Prof. Selim Palmgren (m. 1910 — her death 1929). Both her husbands were also effectively her agents and managers.

Her sister-in-law from her first marriage was Aino Sibelius (née Järnefelt), the wife of Jean Sibelius.

She studied in Germany under Julius Hey, a renowned singing coach and personal friend of Richard Wagner.

Järnefelt-Palmgren died relatively young, at 57: she suffered a stroke during the dress rehearsal of her husband's cantata, Turun Lilja, and died in hospital shortly afterwards.
