= Sigrid Lindberg =

Swedish violinist (1871– 1942)

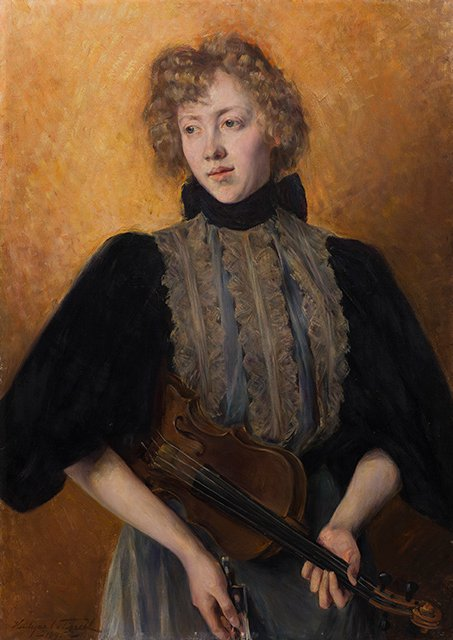
Sigrid Lindberg

Sigrid Lindberg (5 January 1871 – 16 March 1942) was a Swedish concert violinist and teacher. She was the member of the Royal Swedish Academy of Music (currently known as Royal College of Music, Stockholm).

== Biography ==
Born on 5 January 1871 in Stockholm, Sigrid Lindberg was the daughter of Carl Johan Lindberg (1837–1914), a well known Finnish violinist and professor of violin at the Royal Swedish Academy of Music, and his wife Gustava Emelie Lindberg. She studied at the Royal Swedish Academy of Music from 1886 to 1890, where she received a scholarship to complete her musical studies at the Conservatoire de Paris.

She made her debut in 1893. In the beginning, she performed as a soloist at the Royal Theatre's symphony concerts. However, she later played among others at concerts in Paris, Berlin and Monte Carlo.

She widely travelled to different countries and performed at the concerts including in Sweden, Denmark, Finland, Russia, Poland and Turkey.

She died unmarried on 16 March 1942 in Stockholm.
