= Aino Sibelius =

Wife of the Finnish composer Jean Sibelius

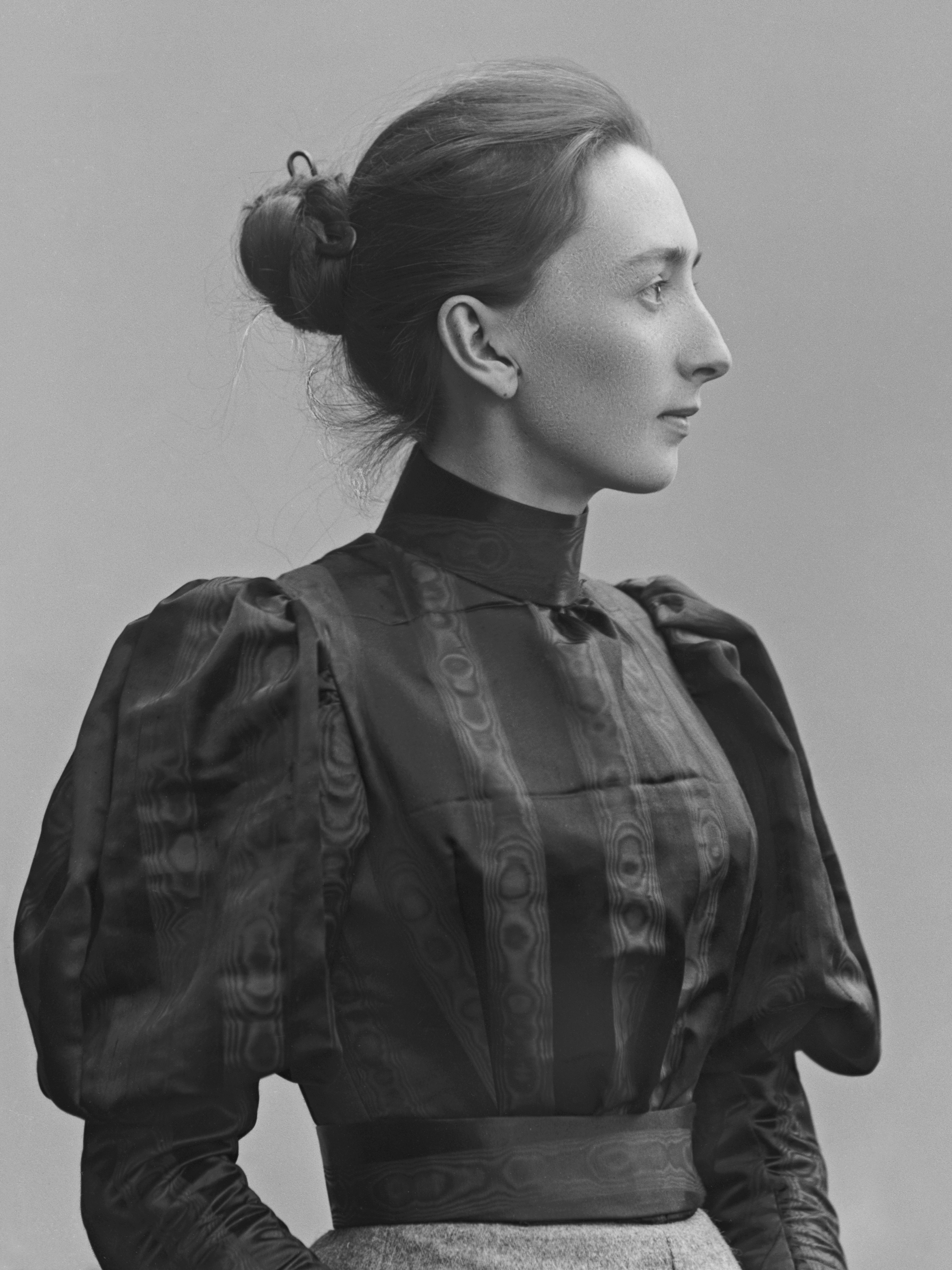
- Aino Sibelius (then Järnefelt) in 1891
- Born: Aino Järnefelt; 10 August 1871; Helsinki, Grand Duchy of Finland, Russian Empire
- Died: 8 June 1969 (aged 97); Järvenpää, Finland
- Spouse: Jean Sibelius (m. 1892; died 1957)
- Children: 6
- Parent(s): Alexander Järnefelt; Elisabeth Clodt von Jürgensburg
- Relatives: Arvid Järnefelt (brother); Eero Järnefelt (brother); Armas Järnefelt (brother); Kasper Järnefelt (brother); Eero Järnefelt (nephew)

Aino Sibelius (née Järnefelt; 10 August 1871 – 8 June 1969) was the wife of Finnish composer Jean Sibelius. They lived most of their 65 years of marriage at their home Ainola near Lake Tuusula, Järvenpää, Finland. They had six daughters: Eva (1893–1978), Ruth (1894–1976), Kirsti (1898–1900), Katarina (1903–1984), Margareta (1908–1988) and Heidi (1911–1982).

== Biography ==
=== Childhood ===
Aino Järnefelt was born in Helsinki, into the strict and disciplined family of Finnish General Alexander Järnefelt and his wife Elisabeth (née Clodt von Jürgensburg) in 1871. She had six older siblings, including writer Arvid Järnefelt, painter Eero Järnefelt, and composer and conductor Armas Järnefelt.

It was her brother Armas who brought his friend and fellow student, Jean Sibelius, to the family home in the winter of 1889. At the time, writer Juhani Aho was expressing affection towards Aino, but he did not receive the response he sought. Within the next few years, Aino became engaged to Sibelius, and they were married with her father's blessing at Maxmo on 10 June 1892.

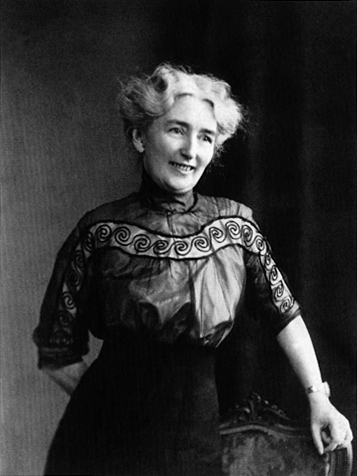
Aino Sibelius in 1922.

=== 1892–1930: Early married life ===
From the time of their engagement, Aino and Sibelius had talked about getting a house of their own in the country, and had looked for a house near Lake Tuusula as early as 1898. When Sibelius's wealthy bachelor uncle died in July 1903, they bought about 2.5 acres (10,000 m^{2}) of land in Järvenpää near Lake Tuusula, using Sibelius's share of his uncle's estate to pay the architect. Lars Sonck was chosen to design their house, which they called Ainola. The Sibelius family moved there in the autumn of 1904, having borrowed a substantial amount of money to buy the land and build the house.

Aino's early years in Järvenpää were stressful and difficult, caused partly by financial worries and partly by her husband's drinking and partying lifestyle. She sought to eke out the family budget by creating a vegetable garden from the stony ground near the house. Aino homeschooled her daughters, a task which she performed very successfully, since they all did well when they later went to school. She spent a period in 1907 convalescing in Hyvinkää Sanatorium.

In 1908 her husband had a throat operation and gave up alcohol for almost seven years, and this was the start of Aino's happiest years. Margareta was born in 1908, then Heidi in 1911 (when Aino was 40 years old), and the children all grew up in Ainola – the only time they lived elsewhere was during the Finnish Civil War in 1918 when they had to move to Helsinki for a couple of months.

=== 1930–1957: Later life ===
By the 1930s the children had all left home, and Aino wanted to move to Helsinki, nearer to their children. During the next few years they spent some time in a rented apartment in Helsinki, but in 1941 they moved back to Ainola with their many grandchildren because of the risk of bombing by the Soviet Union. Jean and Aino Sibelius lived there for the rest of their days, where Aino continued to devote herself to her husband and family, and to her vegetable garden.

=== 1957–1969: Life as a widow ===
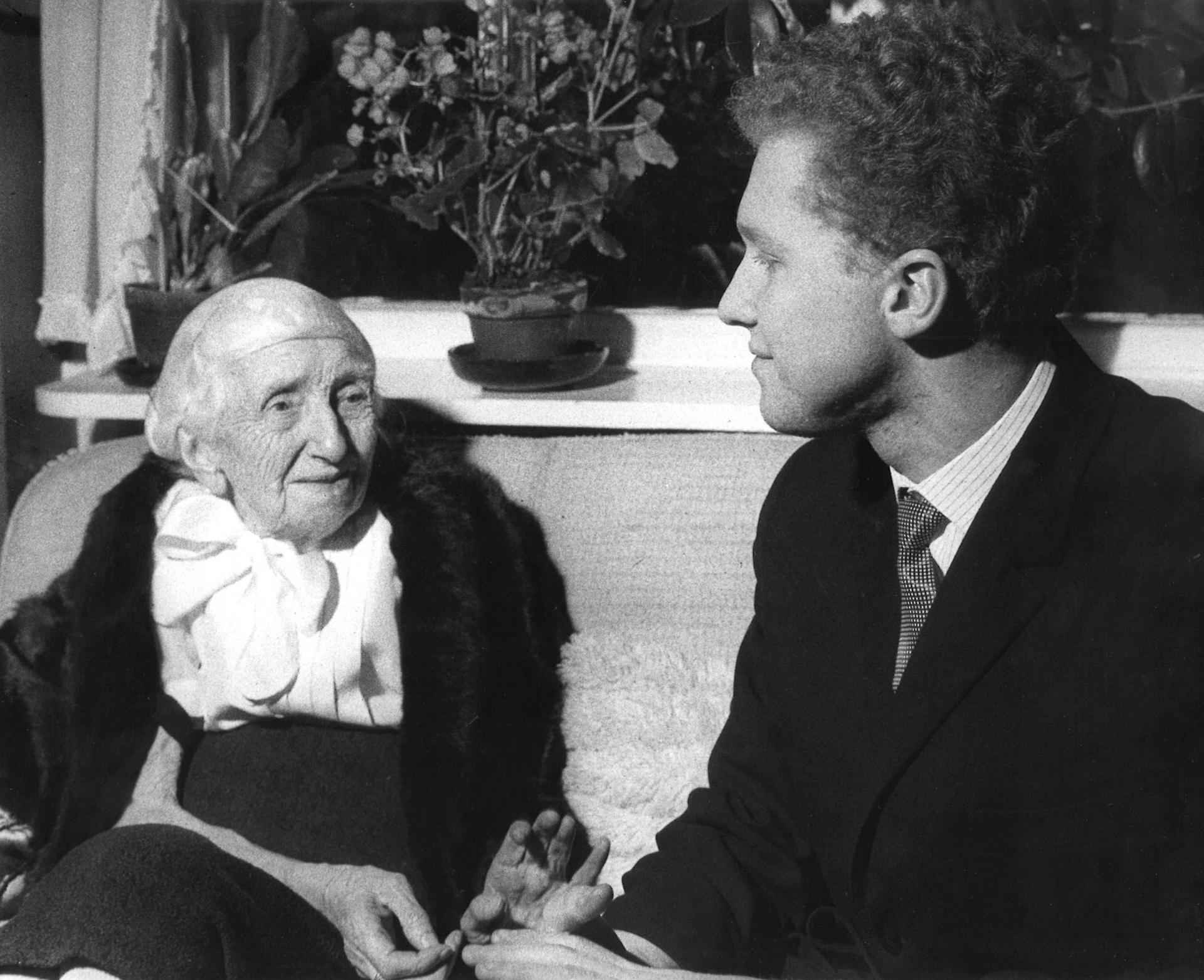
Aino Sibelius meeting with the Russian violinist Oleg Kagan on the 100th birthday of Jean Sibelius.

Jean Sibelius died at Ainola, Järvenpää, on 20 September 1957 and is buried in the garden. Aino continued to live in Ainola after his death; she sorted out family papers and helped Santeri Levas and Erik W. Tawaststjerna who were writing biographies of her late husband. She died at Ainola on 8 June 1969, at age 97, and is buried there next to Jean.

In 1972 Jean Sibelius's daughters, Eva, Ruth, Katarina, Margareta, and Heidi, sold Ainola to the Finnish State and it was opened to the public as a museum in 1974.

== In her own words ==
She wrote about their life together:

I am happy that I have been able to live by his side. I feel that I have not lived for nothing. I do not say that it has always been easy – one has had to repress and control one's own wishes – but I am very happy. I bless my destiny and see it as a gift from heaven. To me my husband's music is the word of God – its source is noble, and it is wonderful to live close to such a source.

== Correspondence ==
Aino Sibelius' correspondence has been published:

- Talas, Suvisirkku; Sibelius, Aino (1999). Aino Sibeliuksen kirjeitä Järnefelt-suvun jäsenille (in Finnish). Helsinki, Finland: Suomalaisen Kirjallisuuden Seura. ISBN 951-717-978-2.
- Sibelius, Jean; Talas, Suvisirkku; Sibelius, Aino (2001). Sydämen aamu: Aino Järnefeltin ja Jean Sibeliuksen kihlausajan kirjeitä (in Finnish). Helsinki, Finland: Suomalaisen Kirjallisuuden Seura. ISBN 951-746-148-8.
- Sibelius, Jean; Talas, Suvisirkku; Sibelius, Aino. Tulen synty: Aino ja Jean Sibeliuksen kirjeenvaihtoa 1892–1904 (in Finnish). Helsinki, Finland: Suomalaisen Kirjallisuuden Seura. ISBN 951-746-471-1.

== Sources ==
- Ainola Foundation. "Aino Sibelius 1871–1969". Ainola. Archived from the original on October 23, 2005.
- Jeremias Ylirotu (Metropoli Oy) (2002). "The occupants of Ainola – Aino Sibelius (1871–1969)". Jean Sibelius – Ainola. Archived from the original on 2007-09-27.
