= Matilda Jungstedt =

Swedish opera singer

- Matilda Jungstedt, about 1913
- Born: 13 October 1864; Norrköping
- Died: 1923 (aged 58–59)
- Occupation: Opera singer
- Relatives: Axel Jungstedt (brother)

Matilda Jungstedt (13 October 1864 – 1923) was a Swedish opera singer. Born in Norrköping, she was the daughter of Johan Nils Jungstedt and Matilda Sundius, and the sister of painter Axel Jungstedt. She performed at the Royal Swedish Opera in Stockholm from 1888.
