= Elisabeth Järnefelt =

Finnish salonist (1839–1929)

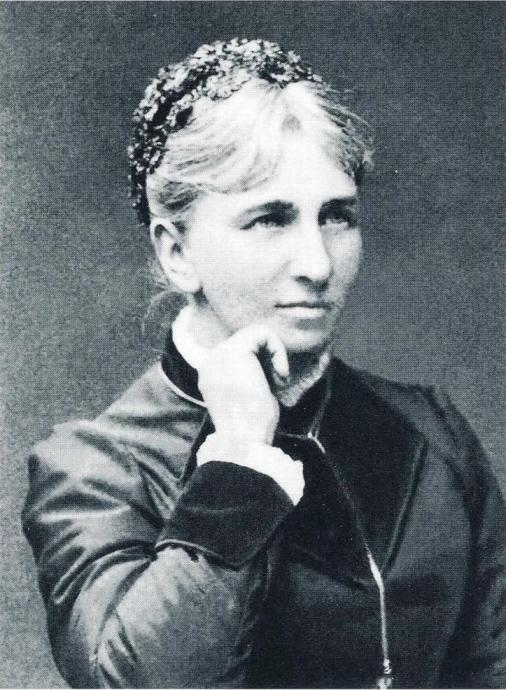
Elisabeth Järnefelt

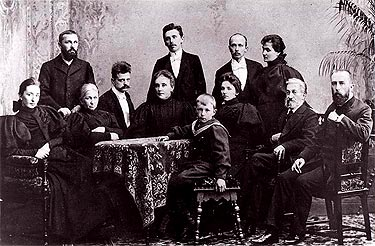
The Järnefelt family with composer Jean Sibelius Standing: Arvid, Armas, Eero and his wife Saimi. Seated: Aino Sibelius, Elisabeth, Jean Sibelius, Emmy (Arvid's wife) and Eero (Arvid's son), Elli, Mikael Clodt von Jürgensburg (Elisabeth's brother) and Kasper. This picture was taken after August Alexander Järnefelt's death in 1896.

Elisabeth Järnefelt (née Clodt von Jürgensburg; 11 January 1839 – 3 February 1929) was a Finnish salonist, known as "the mother of Finnish art and culture".

== Life ==
Elisabeth's parents were the general and wood engraver Konstantin Clodt von Jürgensburg and Catharina Vigné. She was educated first at a girls school and then at home, and raised in Saint Petersburg in Russia.

Elisabeth married August Aleksander Järnefelt on 22 December 1857 at Saint Petersburg, and settled with him in Helsinki in Finland. Their children were Kasper, Arvid, Erik, Ellida, Ellen, Armas, Aino, Hilja and Sigrid. Armas, Arvid and Erik were famous Finnish cultural figures. Daughter Aino Järnefelt was married to composer Jean Sibelius. Elisabeth Järnefelt was also a good friend of the writer Juhani Aho.

Her marriage was not a happy one. After the birth of their last child, her spouse decided to live in chastity: he was described as a strict patriarch who disliked spending money, and Elisabeth Järnefelt was reportedly forced to ask friends and relatives for loans to manage the household economy because her refused to give her enough funds. Eventually, the couple spent as much time away from each other as possible: from 1876 onward, they spoke only through messages delivered by their children. Both of them, however, continued to have a good relationship with their children despite their personal relationship. It is possible that she had an affair with Johannes Brofeldt (also called Juhani Aho) in the 1880s, but never confirmed.

Elisabeth Järnefelt became a central figure of Finnish culture as the host of a literary salon in Helsinki, referred to as "Järnefelts skola" (Järnefelt School), centered around Scandinavian, Finnish and Russian literature. It was also the center of discussion of politics, religion and equality. When her sons was at university, her salon became a center of the Fennoman movement of Finnish nationalism, the association K.P.T. or "koko programmi toimeen", which worked to introduce the Finnish language in then Russian Finland, were the Swedish language was leading in the upper classes. The "Elisabeths krets" (Elisabeth Circle), as the salon was also called, is regarded as the starting point of the modern Finnish language realism and the first Finnish language writers. She was a follower of the Tolstoyan movement, likely the first in Finland. She closed her salon when her spouse moved to Vasa in the end of the 1880s.

After the death of her spouse in 1896, she bought her own farm, Vieremä, where she lived until she moved in with her widowed son Kasper in 1906, with whom she lived the rest of her life. She lived on the pension awarded by Tsarist Russia due to her late spouse being a Russian general, but lost it after the Russian Revolution of 1917, and spent her last years in reduced means.
