= Kuolema (Sibelius) =

Incidental music by Jean Sibelius

- Incidental music by Jean Sibelius
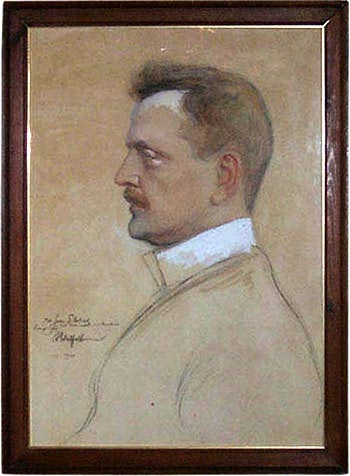
- The composer in 1904, by Albert Edelfelt
- Opus: 44
- Composed: 1903
- Performed: 2 December 1903
- Movements: 6
- Scoring: string orchestra

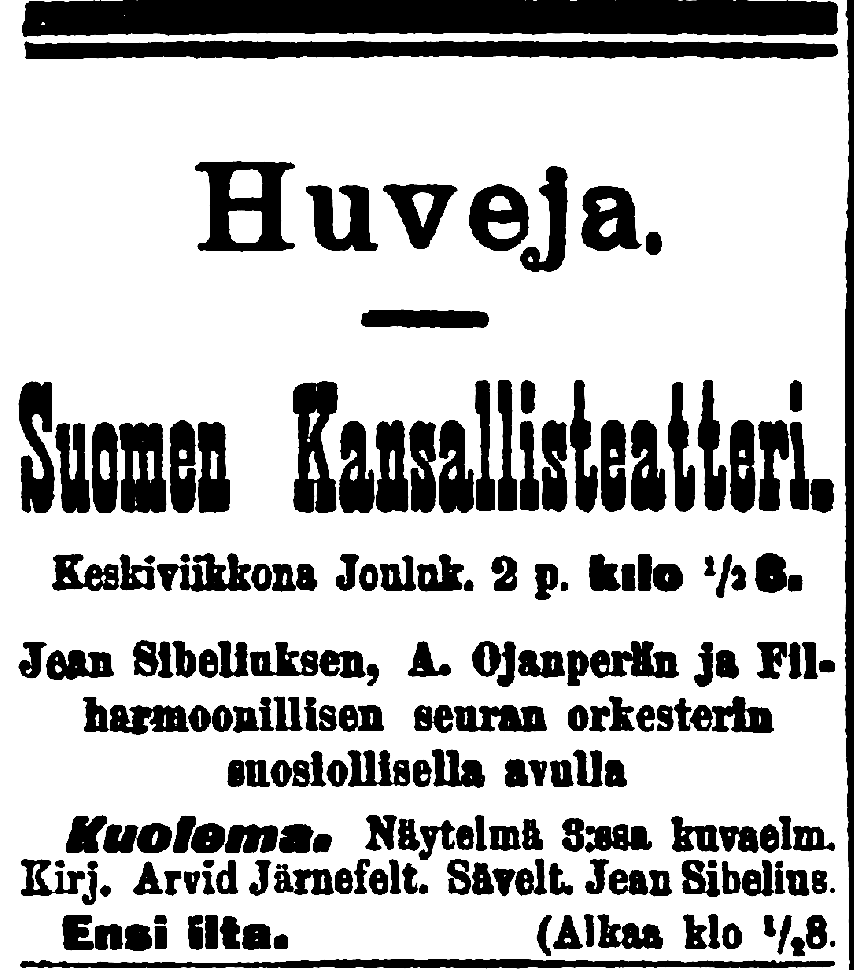
A December 1, 1903 advertisement in Uusi Suometar promoting Sibelius's incidental music to Kuolema

Kuolema (English: Death), JS 113, is incidental music for orchestra by Jean Sibelius for a 1903 play of that title by his brother-in-law Arvid Järnefelt, structured in six movements and originally scored for string orchestra, bass drum and a bell. He conducted the first performance at the Finnish National Theatre in Helsinki on 2 December 1903. He drew individual works from the score and revised them as:

- Op. 44 no. 1 Valse triste, completed in 1904
- Op. 44 no. 2 Scene with Cranes, completed in 1906

For a 1911 production of the play, he added two new movements:

- Op. 62a Canzonetta (Rondino der Liebenden) for string orchestra, first version in 1906, final version in 1911
- Op. 62b Valse romantique (Waltz intermezzo), completed in 1911

== Background ==
Initially, Sibelius wrote six numbers for the 2 December 1903 production:

1. Tempo di valse lente - Poco risoluto (Act I)
2. Moderato (Paavali's Song: 'Pakkanen puhurin poika', for solo baritone, Act II)
3. Moderato assai - Moderato (Elsa's Song: 'Eilaa, eilaa', for solo soprano) - Poco adagio (Act II)
4. Andante (The Cranes, Act II)
5. Moderato (Act III)
6. Andante ma non tanto (Act III)

In 1904, he revised No. 1 as Valse triste, and it was performed in Helsinki on 25 April 1904. It was published as Op. 44 in 1905 by Breitkopf & Härtel, and immediately took on a life of its own. It became an instant hit with the public, and one of Sibelius's signature pieces. However, because of the publishing contract, Sibelius saw relatively little money in terms of royalties from the performances of Valse triste.

In 1906, he combined Nos. 3 and 4 and revised the music under the title Scene with Cranes. This was performed in Vaasa on 14 December 1906. Sibelius did not ascribe an opus number to it, it was not performed again in his lifetime, and it was not published until 1973, 16 years after his death.

In 1906, he wrote a Rondino der Liebenden for string orchestra, adapted from the music for Kuolema. It lay unperformed until 1911.

In 1911, Järnefelt produced a revised version of the play. For this, Sibelius wrote a revised version of Rondino der Liebenden, which he now called Canzonetta; and a new piece, Valse romantique. These were first performed in Helsinki at the Finnish National Theatre on 8 March 1911, together with Valse triste. The play was not a success, however, hoping to repeat the success of Valse triste with Canzonetta and Valse romantique, Sibelius immediately published them together, as Op. 62a and Op. 62b respectively. They failed to grab the public's attention the way Valse triste had done.

In 1973, Scene with Cranes was posthumously published, as Op. 44, No. 2, and Valse triste was retrospectively renumbered as Op. 44, No. 1.

Recordings and performances sometimes present Valse triste, Scene with Cranes, Canzonetta and Valse romantique as a unified suite, as it represents the totality of what is known of the incidental music for the two versions of Kuolema. However, this was not Sibelius's intention.

== Literature ==
- Mäkelä, Tomi (2013). Jean Sibelius und seine Zeit [Jean Sibelius and his time] (in German). Regensburg: Laaber-Verlag. ISBN 9783890077673.

== Additional reading ==
- Kurki, Eija (2020). "A Play about Death, but the Music Lives On: Sibelius's Music for the Play Kuolema". SibeliusOne.com. Sibelius One.
