= Galina Werschenska =

Russian-born Danish pianist

Galina Plesner Werschenska (21 December 1906 – 2 December 1994) was a Russian-born Danish pianist who settled in Denmark in 1929. She quickly gained a reputation as a soloist, a chamber musician and an educator. In addition to performances throughout Denmark, she appeared in Norway, Sweden, Germany and Poland, frequently playing piano concertos under Danish and foreign conductors. Many of her 78-rpm recordings have been reissued as CDs.

== Early life and education ==
Born on 21 December 1906 in Saint Petersburg, Galina Werschenska was the daughter of the Polish physician Joseph Werschenski (died 1934) and his Russian wife. As a child, she experienced the hardships of the Russian Revolution, including the confiscation of her family's property. When she was 12, on her own initiative she studied piano under Nadezhda Golubovskaya (1891–1975), first at Alexander Siloti's school, later at the Saint Petersburg Conservatory where she graduated with distinction in 1924.

== Career ==
On 10 August 1925, she married the Danish official Karl Ingemund Plesner (1900–1950). After she had briefly started her concert career in Russia, the couple moved to Denmark in November 1929. Despite giving birth to her first child, thanks to her husband's support Werschenska managed to perform her first concert within a year. She became acquainted with two of the country's leading pianists, Agnes Adler and Johanne Stockmarr, who treated her as an equal. Furthermore, Anton Svendsen, director of the Royal Danish Conservatory, had invited her to perform. Her concert was a great success, receiving critical acclaim mentioning her fine technique and her romantic style.

In the 1930s, she concentrated above all on chamber music, playing in various trios together with the cellist Louis Jensen and in a quintet with four strings from the Royal Orchestra. As a soloist, she played with the radio symphony orchestras of Scandinavia, Warsaw and Berlin. After her husband died in a car accident in 1950, she suffered from a nervous ailments which disabled her hands. Although she later started to play again, often performing in hospitals, sanatoriums and prisons.

Galina Werschenska died in Aarhus on 2 December 1994.
