= Eero Järnefelt (diplomat) =

Finnish diplomat (1888–1970)

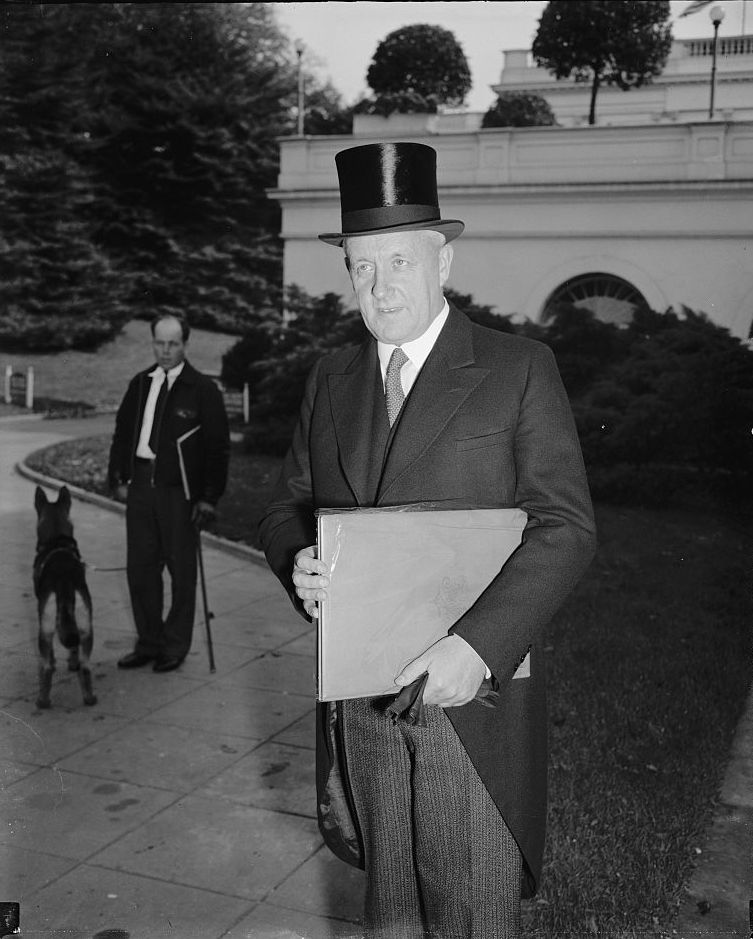
Eero Järnefelt in Washington D.C. in 1938.

Eero Järnefelt (3 May 1888 – 28 January 1970) was a Finnish diplomat.

Eero Järnefelt was born in Saint Petersburg. His parents were writer Arvid Järnefelt and Emilia Fredrika Parviainen. He graduated privately in 1905 from the Ressu Upper Secondary School and graduated as a Candidate of Philosophy at the University of Helsinki in 1909. Järnefelt was a journalist for Helsingin Sanomat in 1914–1920, after which he moved to the Ministry of Foreign Affairs.

Järnefelt was a Chargé d'Affaires to Moscow in 1921 and again from 1921 to 1922.

Jarnefelt was Permanent Secretary of the Ministry of Foreign Affairs from 1933 to 1934, then Envoy to Washington, D.C. 1934–1938, Cuba 1934–1938, Rome 1938–1940 and Athens 1938–1940 and Warsaw from 1945 to 1955 (from 1954 Ambassador). He died, aged 81, in Helsinki.
