= Kuolema =

1903 play by Arvid Järnefelt

Kuolema (Death) is a drama by the Finnish writer Arvid Järnefelt, first performed on 2 December 1903. He revised the work in 1911.

The play is notable for its incidental music: a group of six compositions created by the author's brother-in-law, Jean Sibelius. The most famous selection is the opening number, Valse triste (Sad Waltz), was later adapted into a separate concert piece.

== The play ==
The play is in three acts. Act I features the boy Paavali and his mother, who is ill. When she is asleep, music is heard, and she has a dream of dancers, who start to fill the room. She then joins them in their dance, but becomes exhausted. As the dancers leave, she begins to dance again. However, Death knocks at the door three times, and the music stops. Death claims her, in the form of her late husband.

Act II features Paavali years later as a wandering young man. At one point, he comes across a cottage, where an 'old witch' lives. In the cottage, Paavali bakes bread and lights the fire for the witch. She gives him a ring that allows him to see his future bride. The scene changes at once to a forest in summer, where Elsa, a young woman, sings to herself, and Paavali meets her. After sleeping beside each other, Paavali wakes to resume his travels, but Elsa wants him to remain. A flock of cranes flies overhead at that point, one of which separates from the group, carrying an infant to them.

In Act III, Paavali and Elsa have since been married. He has used his funds to build a school. Later, Paavali's and Elsa's house catches fire. As the house burns, Paavali reflects on his past life, and sees the ghost of his mother, holding a scythe, in the flames. In parallel with the end of Act I, Death has come to claim Paavali in his mother's form. Paavali dies as the house collapses on him. The last scene sees the villagers consoling Elsa and the children and recalling Paavali. Elsa says at the end that Paavali lives in the hearts of the people.
