= Valse triste =

Short orchestral work composed by Jean Sibelius

- Concert piece by Jean Sibelius
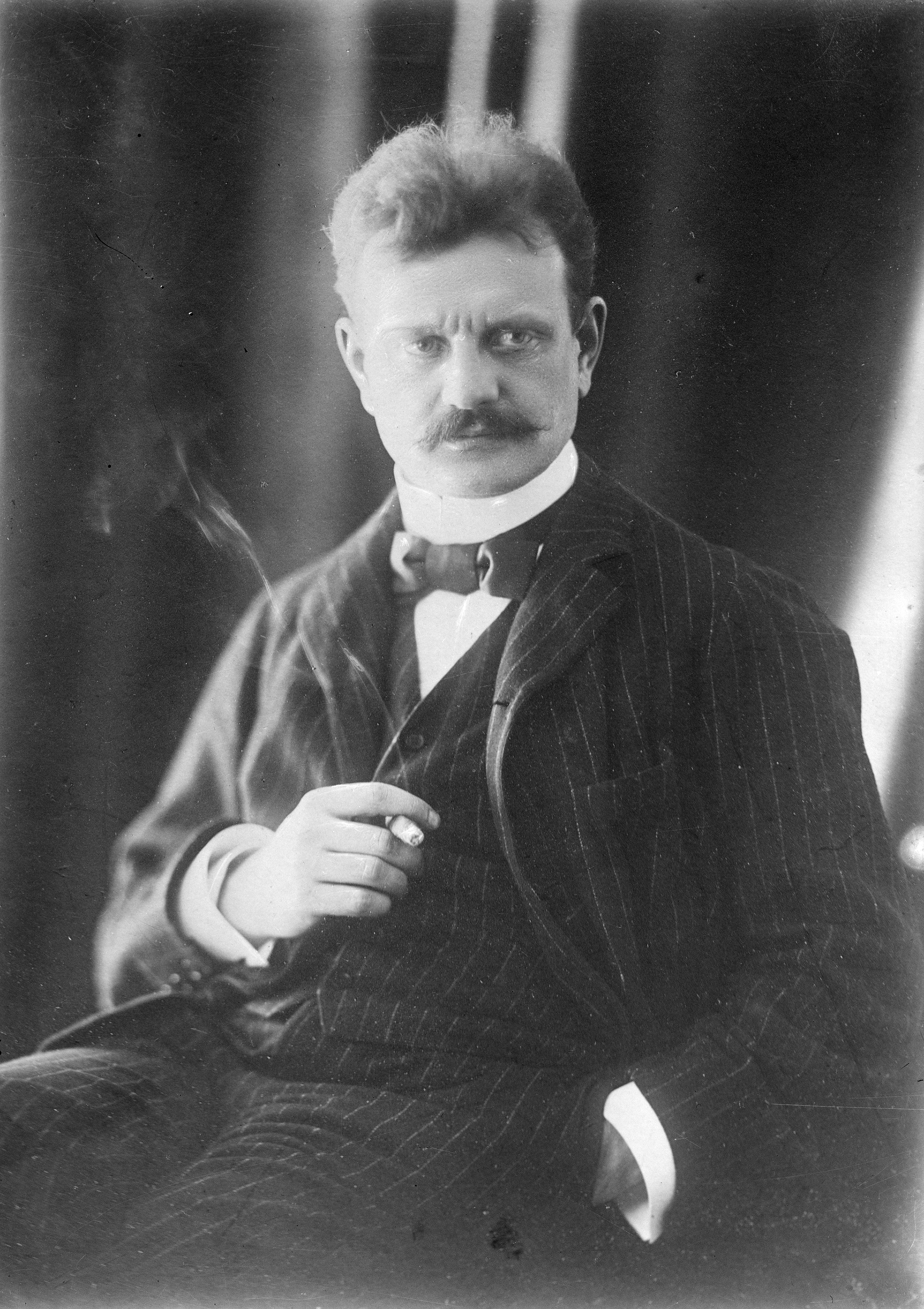
- The composer (c. 1902)
- Catalogue: JS 113/1 (original version)
- Opus: 44/1 (revised version)
- Composed: 1903, rev. 1904
- Publisher: Fazer & Westerlund (1901) (Note: On 20 July 1905, the Helsinki-based music publisher Fazer & Westerlund (Helsingfors Nya Musikhandel) sold its Sibelius holdings (the publishing rights and printing plates) to the German firm of Breitkopf & Härtel.)
- Duration: 6 mins. (orig. 5 mins.)

Premiere
- Date: 2 December 1903 (JS 113/1); 25 April 1904 (Op. 44/1)
- Location: Helsinki, Grand Duchy of Finland
- Conductor: Jean Sibelius
- Performers: Helsinki Philharmonic Society

Valse triste (literal English translation: Sad Waltz), Op. 44/1, is a short orchestral work by the Finnish composer Jean Sibelius. It was originally part of the incidental music he composed for his brother-in-law Arvid Järnefelt's 1903 play Kuolema (Death), but is far better known as a separate concert piece.

Sibelius wrote six pieces for the 2 December 1903 production of Kuolema. The opening number was titled Tempo di valse lente - Poco risoluto. In 1904 he revised the piece, which was performed in Helsinki on 25 April of that year as Valse triste. It was an instant hit with the public, took on a life of its own, and remains one of Sibelius's signature pieces.

== Background ==
The background to the music as it functions within the original play is expanded upon by the programme notes for the production:

It is night. The son, who has been watching beside the bedside of his sick mother, has fallen asleep from sheer weariness. Gradually, a ruddy light is diffused through the room: there is a sound of distant music: the glow and the music steal nearer until the strains of a valse melody float distantly to our ears. The sleeping mother awakens, rises from her bed and, in her long white garment, which takes the semblance of a ball dress, begins to move silently and slowly to and fro. She waves her hands and beckons in time to the music, as though she were summoning a crowd of invisible guests. And now they appear, these strange visionary couples, turning and gliding to an unearthly valse rhythm. The dying woman mingles with the dancers; she strives to make them look into her eyes, but the shadowy guests one and all avoid her glance. Then she seems to sink exhausted on her bed and the music breaks off. Presently she gathers all her strength and invokes the dance once more, with more energetic gestures than before. Back come the shadowy dancers, gyrating in a wild, mad rhythm. The weird gaiety reaches a climax; there is a knock at the door, which flies wide open; the mother utters a despairing cry; the spectral guests vanish; the music dies away. Death stands on the threshold.

== Publication and later developments ==
The British premiere was on 21 August 1909 at the Promenade Concerts, conducted by Henry Wood.

The original version, presented in 1903 as Tempo di valse lente - Poco risoluto, has not survived. Breitkopf & Härtel published the later piece in 1905 as 'Op. 44'. However, because of the nature of the publishing contract, Sibelius saw relatively little money in terms of royalties from performances of Valse triste. In 1906, Sibelius merged the third and fourth numbers of the incidental music into a single piece, which he renamed Scene with Cranes. This was posthumously published in 1973, as Op. 44, No. 2; Valse triste was retrospectively renumbered as Op. 44, No. 1.

According to the International Music Score Library Project in 2014, the work is "in the public domain in Canada (where IMSLP is hosted) and other countries where the term is life-plus-50 years (like China, Japan, Korea and many others worldwide). As this work was first published before 1923 or failed to meet notice or renewal requirements to secure statutory copyright, it is very likely to be public domain in the USA as well."

On April 19, 1952, record label Columbia Records and Porgie Music settled out of court with George Williams, who had sued the label for royalties in 1949 after it recorded (with Gene Krupa) Williams' jazz arrangement of Valse Triste.

On November 13, 2014, the Vienna Philharmonic posted a notice on its Facebook page stating, "The Vienna Philharmonic regrets to have to make a change to the previously announced program of the New Year's Concert 2015. Due to unacceptable demands made by the publisher [which remains Breitkopf & Härtel], Valse triste, which had been intended to mark the 150th anniversary of the birth of Jean Sibelius, will not be performed as part of the New Year's Concert 2015. We are pleased to announce that, instead, the orchestra will perform the Anna Polka (in German: Annen-Polka), op. 117, by Johann Strauss, Jr., under the baton of Zubin Mehta."

== In other media ==
- Valse triste was used in the 1934 film Death Takes a Holiday starring Fredric March. It was playing inside the mansion during the scene in which Death, in the form of a man, dances in the garden with a young woman named Grazia.
- Valse triste was used as the theme music for the radio series I Love a Mystery which was originally broadcast between 1939 and 1944.
- "Valse Triste" was a 1942 episode of the 1934–1947 radio horror series Lights Out.
- Wayne Shorter recorded a version of Valse triste for his 1965 album The Soothsayer. He also recorded Valse triste with his new quartet on Footprints Live! from 2002. Valse triste was also partly the inspiration for the track 'Dance Cadaverous' on his 1966 album Speak No Evil.
- The animated 1976 film Allegro Non Troppo used Valse triste in "Feline Fantasies", a segment about the ghost of a lonely cat roaming around the ruins of the house it once inhabited.
- Avant-garde filmmaker Bruce Conner directed an experimental film called Valse Triste (1977) using the Sibelius music.
- Wendy Carlos created a synthesizer version of Valse triste for Stanley Kubrick's 1980 film The Shining. The piece was not used in the film, but it can be heard at the end of Making The Shining, a documentary by Kubrick's daughter about the shooting of the film.
- An a cappella arrangement of Valse triste was recorded by the Finnish vocal ensemble Rajaton on the album Maa to mark the 50th anniversary, in 2007, of Sibelius's death.
- Valse triste was used in the Rio 2016 Olympic Games ribbon routine of Yana Kudryavtseva, silver medalist in the Rhythmic Gymnastics All-Around competition.

== Instrumentation ==
The score is written for flute, clarinet in A, two horns in F, timpani (unusually just a single one in D) and strings.

== Additional reading ==
- Dahlström, Fabian [in Swedish] (2003). Jean Sibelius: Thematisch-bibliographisches Verzeichnis seiner Werke [Jean Sibelius: A Thematic Bibliographic Index of His Works] (in German). Wiesbaden: Breitkopf & Härtel. ISBN 3-7651-0333-0.
- Kurki, Eija (2020). "A Play about Death, but the Music Lives On: Sibelius's Music for the Play Kuolema". SibeliusOne.com. Sibelius One.
