= Arvid Järnefelt =

Finnish judge and writer (1861–1932)

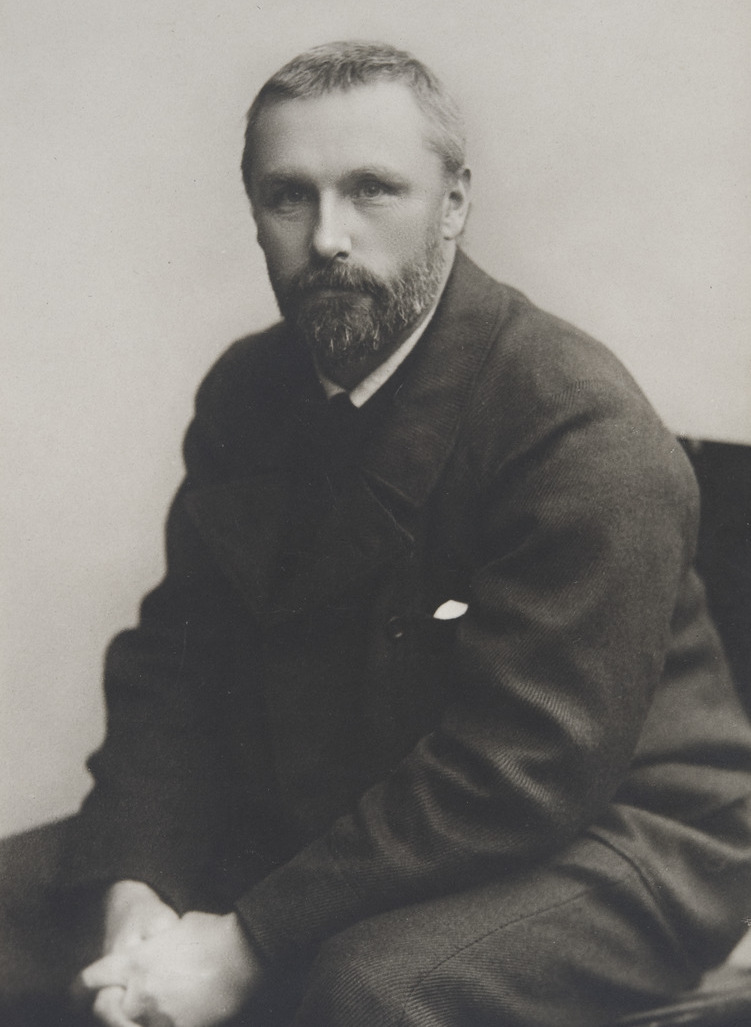
Järnefelt c. 1900

Arvid Järnefelt (November 16, 1861 – December 27, 1932) was a Finnish judge and writer born in Pulkovo, Russia.

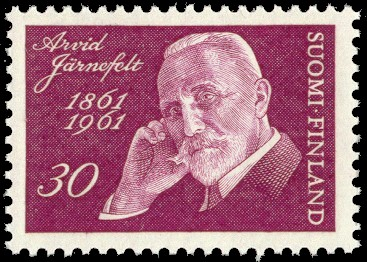
Postage stamp depicting Arvid Järnefelt.

Järnefelt was among the founders of the Finnish language literary and cultural magazine Valvoja which was launched in 1880. Järnefelt translated Progress and Poverty to Finnish.

== Life and career ==
Järnefelt was born in Pulkovo (now part of Saint Petersburg), in the Tsarskoselsky Uyezd of the Saint Petersburg Governorate of the Russian Empire, to Alexander Järnefelt, a lieutenant general, and Elisabeth Clodt von Jürgensburg. He was married to Emilia Fredrika Parviainen. Järnefelt completed his matriculation exam in 1880, earned a Bachelor of Philosophy in 1885, and became a lawyer in 1890. He pursued studies in Moscow from 1887 to 1888. He served as a parliamentary secretary and interpreter in 1891 and was also a farmer in Lohja. Järnefelt received the state literature prize in 1900, 1903, 1904, 1905, 1925, and 1927.

== Works ==
Järnefelt's signature

- Kuolema (Death) (1903, revised 1911)
- Lalli (1933)
- Isänmaa (1893)
- Heräämiseni (1894)
- Ateisti (1895)
- Ihmiskohtaloja (1895)
- Maria (1897)
- Puhtauden ihanne (1897)
- Evankeliumin alku eli Jeesuksen syntyminen ihmisestä ja Jumalasta (1898)
- Päiväkirja matkaltani Venäjällä ja käynti Leo Tolstoin luona keväällä 1899(1899)
- Samuel Cröell (1899)
- Pikku Simon seikkailut joulu-iltana (1900)
- Veljekset (1900)
- Mitä on Jumalan palvelus? (1901)
- Helena (1902)
- Orjan oppi (1902)
- Elämän meri (1904)
- Lukemisen ja kirjoittamisen alkuopetus kotiopetusta varten (1905)
- Maaemon lapsia (1905)
- Jeesuksen syntyminen ihmisestä ja Jumalasta (1907)
- Maa kuuluu kaikille! (1907)
- Veneh’ojalaiset (1909)
- Hiljaisuudessa (1913)
- Kallun kestit (1914)
- Manon Roland (1914)
- Valtaset (1915)
- Onnelliset (1916)
- Kirkkopuheet (1917)
- Kirjeitä sukupuolikysymyksistä (1918)
- Nuoruuteni muistelmia (1919)
- Sointula (1924)
- Greeta ja hänen Herransa (1925)
- Huligaani ynnä muita kertoelmia (1926)
- Teoksia (1926–1927)
- Minun Marttani (1927)
- Vanhempieni romaani: 1. Elisabet ja Aleksander (1928)
- Vanhempieni romaani: 2. Aleksander ja Elisabet Suomessa (1929)
- Vanhempieni romaani: 3. Elisabetin usko (1930)
- Valitut teokset (1953)
- Maa kuuluu kaikille (1980)
- Arvid Järnefelt (1986)

== See also ==
- Kuolema (Sibelius)
- Valse triste
- Päivälehti
