= Sorokin =

Sorokin (Russian: Соро́кин), or Sorokina (feminine; Соро́кина), is a common Russian surname, derived from the Russian word soroka (сорока, or magpie). Those bearing it include the following:

- Aleksandr Sorokin (born 1981), Lithuanian long-distance runner
- Aleksei Sorokin (politician) (1888–1933), Estonian politician
- Alexey Sorokin (fashion designer) (born 1983), Russian fashion designer
- Alexey Sorokin (military commander) (1922–2020), admiral and Hero of the Soviet Union
- Anastasia Sorokina (born 1980), Belarusian/Australian chess international master
- Andrey Sorokin (historian) (born 1959), Russian historian and archivist
- Andrei Sorokin (born 1996), Russian footballer
- Andriy Sorokin (born 1991), Ukrainian footballer
- Anna Sorokina (disambiguation), multiple people
- Anna Sorokin (born 1991), Russian fraudster
- Anton Sorokin (born 1996), Russian footballer
- Coti Sorokin (born 1973), Argentine singer-songwriter
- Darya Sorokina (born 2002), Azerbaijani rhythmic gymnast
- Dmitry Sorokin (born 1992), Russian athlete
- Dmytro Sorokin (born 1988), Ukrainian futsal player
- Elena Sorokina, curator, art historian and writer
- Evgraf Sorokin (1821–1892), Russian painter
- Ganna Sorokina (born 1976), Ukrainian diver
- Ilya Sorokin (born 1995), Russian ice hockey player
- Irina Sorokina (born 1963), Russian-Norwegian laser physicist
- Ivan Sorokin (1884–1918), Russian commander during the Russian Civil War
- Leo T. Sorokin, American jurist
- Lyudmila Sorokina (1944–1998), Russian teacher and museum worker
- Maria Sorokina (born 1995), Russian ice hockey player
- Maxim Sorokin (1968–2007), Russian chess grandmaster
- Mikhail Sorokin, Russian skier
- Natalie Sorokin (1921–1967), French woman known for her affairs with Simone de Beauvoir and Jean-Paul Sartre
- Nataliya Sorokina (born 1976), Russian swimmer
- Nikolai Sorokin (1952–2013), Russian theatre and film actor, theatre director, educator
- Nikolay Sorokin (born 1982), Russian handball player
- Nina Sorokina (1942–2011), Russian dancer
- Olga Sorokina (born 1985), Belarusian model
- Pavel Sorokin (disambiguation), multiple people
- Peter P. Sorokin (1931–2015), American physicist, co-inventor of the dye laser
- Pitirim Sorokin (1889–1968), Russian-American sociologist
- Pyotr Sorokin (1889–1942), Russian football player
- Roman Sorokin (born 1985), Russian football player
- Sergei Sorokin (born 1969), Russian ice hockey player
- Stanislav Sorokin (boxer) (1941–1991), Soviet boxer
- Stanislav Sorokin (footballer) (born 2000), Ukrainian football player
- Svetlana Sorokina (born 1957), Russian journalist and teacher
- Tamara Sorokina (born 1950), Russian middle-distance runner
- Tatiana Sorokina (born 1970), Russian singer
- Vadim Sorokin (born 1956), Russian businessman
- Valentina Sorokina (1936–2022), Russian pig farmer and politician
- Valeria Sorokina (born 1984), Russian badminton player
- Valeri Sorokin (disambiguation), multiple people
- Vasili Sorokin (1833–1918), Russian mosaic artist
- Vasily Sorokin (born 1927), Russian sports shooter
- Vitaly Sorokin (1935–1995), Russian swimmer
- Vladimir Sorokin (born 1955), Russian writer
- Vsevolod Sorokin (born 1993), Russian ice hockey player
- Yegor Sorokin (born 1995), Russian footballer
- Zakhar Sorokin (1917–1978), Soviet military officer and Hero of the Soviet Union

== See also ==
- Sorkin, surname
- Sorok
- Soroki
- Sorokina, genus of fungi
