= Clodt von Jürgensburg =

German-Russian family

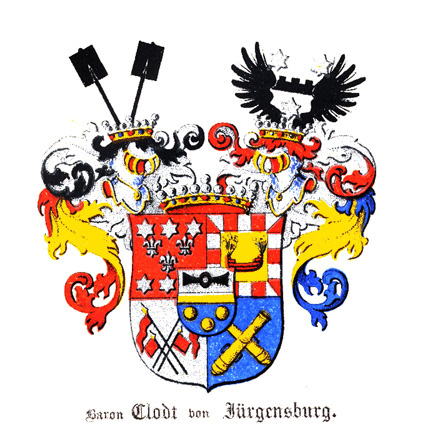
Coat of Arms of Clodts von Jürgensburg

The House Clodt von Jürgensburg (or Klodt; Russian: Клодт фон Юргенсбург) was a Russian noble family of Baltic German origin, whose members were prominent soldiers and artists.

== Notable members ==
- Baron Johan Adolf Clodt von Jürgensburg, (1658–1720)
- Baron Gustaf Adolf Clodt von Jürgensburg (1692–1738), son of Johan Adolf
- Karl Gustav Clodt von Jürgensburg (1765–1822), colonel since 1806, participant in Patriotic War of 1812;
- Vladimir Clodt von Jürgensburg (1803–1887), professor of mathematics and general, chief of drawing department of the General Staff of Russian Army; son of Karl;
- Peter Clodt von Jürgensburg (1805–1867), prominent Russian sculptor, son of Karl;
- Konstantin Clodt von Jürgensburg (1807–1879), the first Russian wood engraver, son of Karl;
- Mikhail Petrovich Clodt von Jürgensburg (1835–1914), Russian painter, member of Peredvizhniki; son of Peter;
- Mikhail Konstantinovich Clodt von Jürgensburg (1832–1902); prominent realist painter; son of Konstantin;
- Elisabeth Järnefelt (née Clodt von Jürgensburg, 1839–1929); daughter of Konstantin; mother of Arvid, Eero and Armas Järnefelt, and Aino Sibelius;
- Nikolai Clodt von Jürgensburg (1865–1918) painter, grandson of Peter;
- Yevgeni Clodt von Jürgensburg (1867–1935), painter and jeweler, grandson of Konstantin;
- Pyotr Mikhailovich Clodt (1903–1942) painter, son of Mikhail Petrovich;
