= Nikolai Clodt von Jürgensburg =

Russian painter (1865–1918)

- Born: 14 October [O.S. 2 October] 1865; Saint Petersburg, Russia
- Died: 23 September 1918 (aged 52); Moscow, Russia
- Education: Moscow School of Painting, Sculpture and Architecture
- Known for: Painting
- Movement: Impressionism

Nikolai Alexandrovich Clodt von Jürgensburg (Russian: Николай Александрович Клодт фон Юргенсбург; known in Russia as Nikolai Klodt; 14 October 1865 – 23 September 1918) was a Russian painter of landscape and, later in his life, theatre stage-designer.

== Biography ==
Nikolai Klodt was born on 14 October 1865 in Saint Petersburg to an artistic family. The sculptor Peter Clodt von Jürgensburg was his grandfather. Two of his uncles, Mikhail Petrovich Klodt and Mikhail Konstantinovich Klodt, were well-known painters too. He studied at the Moscow School of Painting, Sculpture and Architecture which he graduated in 1886. Among his tutors were Vladimir Makovsky and Evgraf Sorokin.

In the late 1880s–early 1890s Klodt read fine arts at the Anatoly Gunst Art College. He spent most of the decade on the road, and his works of this period were strongly influenced by his travels to the Russian North, and along the Volga River.

In 1900 Klodt took part in organising and designing of the Russian pavilion for the Paris World Fair, mostly in collaboration with Konstantin Korovin, who played the major part in the exposition (and was later awarded the Legion of Honour by the French government). In 1901 Klodt, now under the strong influence of impressionism, started to work as stage designer, for the leading theatres of St Petersburg and Moscow. With Korovin he created the stage design for the ballet The Little Humpbacked Horse by Cesare Pugni at the Bolshoi Theatre, in 1901. In 1903, working with set designs by Alexandre Benois, he decorated the scene of Richard Wagner's Götterdämmerung for Mariinsky Theatre.

Klodt regularly took part in the expositions of the leading Russian art groups, including Peredvizhniki (1894), the Moscow Art Society (1889, 1892–1895, 1897), The Exposition of the Thirty Six (Выставка 36-ти художников, 1901, 1902) and the Union of Russian Artists (1903–1917). His major works are exposed at the Tretyakov Gallery and Russian Museum, as well as the regional museums, in Plyos, Kostroma, and Vologda. Nikolai Klodt died on 23 September 1918 in Moscow and is interred in Vagankovo Cemetery.

== Legacy ==
Among the colleagues who valued his legacy exceptionally high was Igor Grabar, who considered him to be Russia's "greatly underrated master of art" who "during his endless travels developed extraordinary technical prowess as well as the unique style which made its marks in the history of Russian fine art."

== Selected works by Nikolai Klodt ==
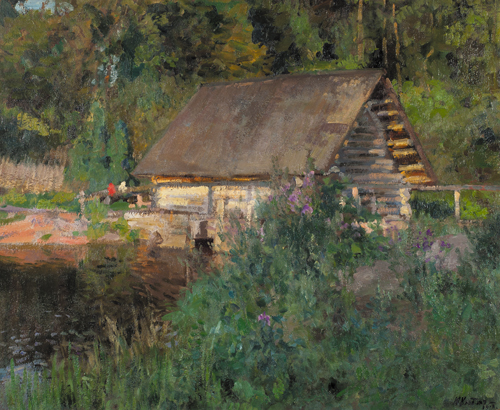
Лето; Summer

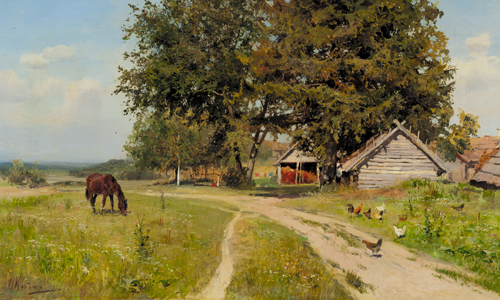
Сельский пейзаж Rural Landscape

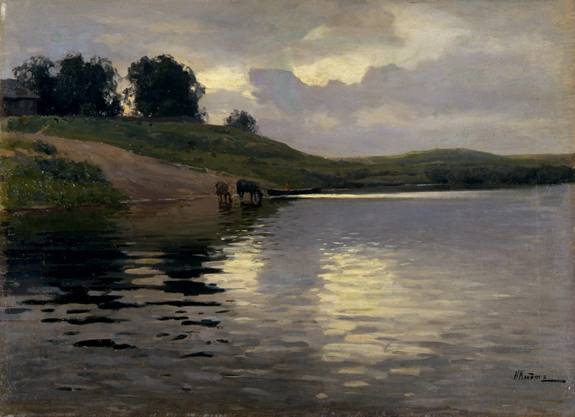
Речной пейзаж River Landscape

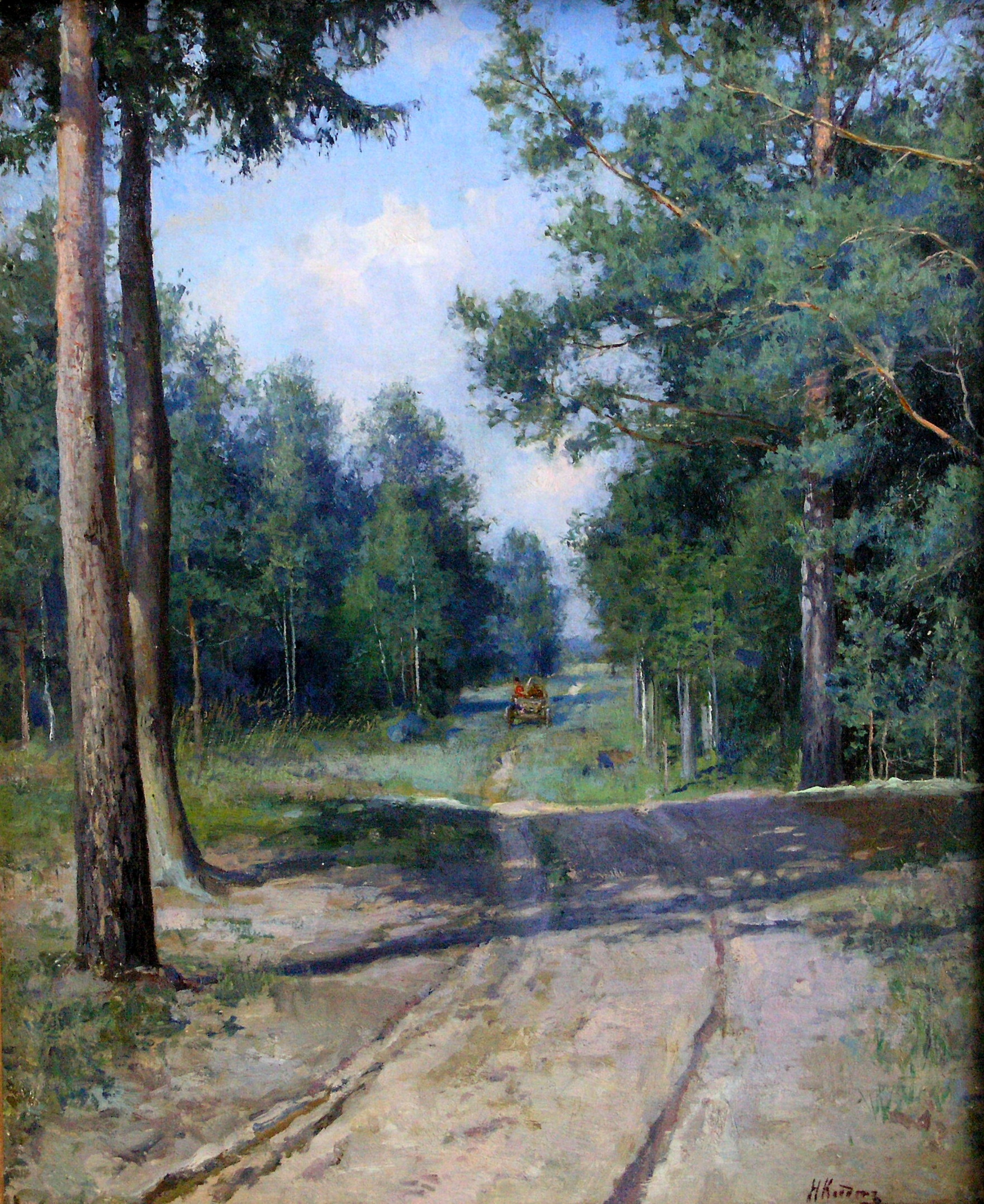
Лесная дорога Forest Road
