= Sorkin =

Sorkin (Russian: Соркин; feminine form: Sorkina) is a matronymic Russian Jewish surname meaning "son of Sorka", where Sorka is a Yiddish diminutive of Sarah. Variants include Surkin and Syrkin.

Notable people with the surname include:

- Aaron Sorkin (born 1961), American screenwriter, producer, and playwright
- Amy Davidson Sorkin (born 1969/1970), American journalist
- Andrew Ross Sorkin (born 1977), American journalist
- Arleen Sorkin (1956–2023), American actress
- David Sorkin, American historian
- Ina Sorkina (born 1971), Belarusian historian
- Ira Sorkin (born 1943), American attorney
- Ihor Sorkin (born 1967), chairman of the National Bank of Ukraine
- Jenni Sorkin (born 1977), American art historian
- Leonard Sorkin (1916–1985), American violinist
- Marc Sorkin (1902–1986), Russian-American film director
- Michael Sorkin (1948–2020), American architect
- Michael Sorkin, American journalist
- Nancy Sorkin Rabinowitz, American classicist
- Naum Sorkin (1899–1980), Soviet general
- Rafael Sorkin (born 1945), American physicist
- Roman Sorkin (born 1996), Israeli basketball player

== See also ==
- Zeitlin
- Sarasohn (Sarason)
- Sorokin
