= Pavel Sorokin =

Pavel Sorokin may refer to:

- Pavel Sorokin (painter) (1836/39 – 1886), Russian painter
- Pavel Sorokin (conductor) (born 1963), Russian conductor
