= Pavel Sorokin (painter) =

Russian painter

Pavel Semenovich Sorokin (1836/39 – 1886) was a Russian painter of religious themes. He was a member of the Imperial Academy of Arts in Saint Petersburg and died in Moscow.

Sorokin was the brother of artists Evgraf and Vasili Sorokin.
