= Vasili Sorokin =

Russian mosaics artist

Vasili Semenovich Sorokin (1833–1918) was a Russian mosaics artist. He studied at the Imperial Academy of Arts in Saint Petersburg; among his works are mosaics for the Church of St. Isaac in Moscow.

Sorokin was the brother of painters Pavel and Evgraf Sorokin.
