= Anichkov Bridge =

Stone bridge in Saint Petersburg, Russia

Coordinates: 59.933°N 30.343°E

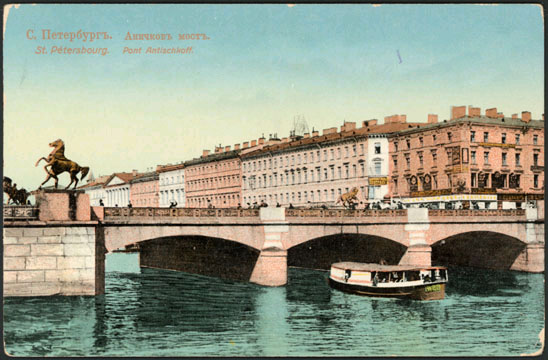
The Fontanka River at the Anichkov Bridge.

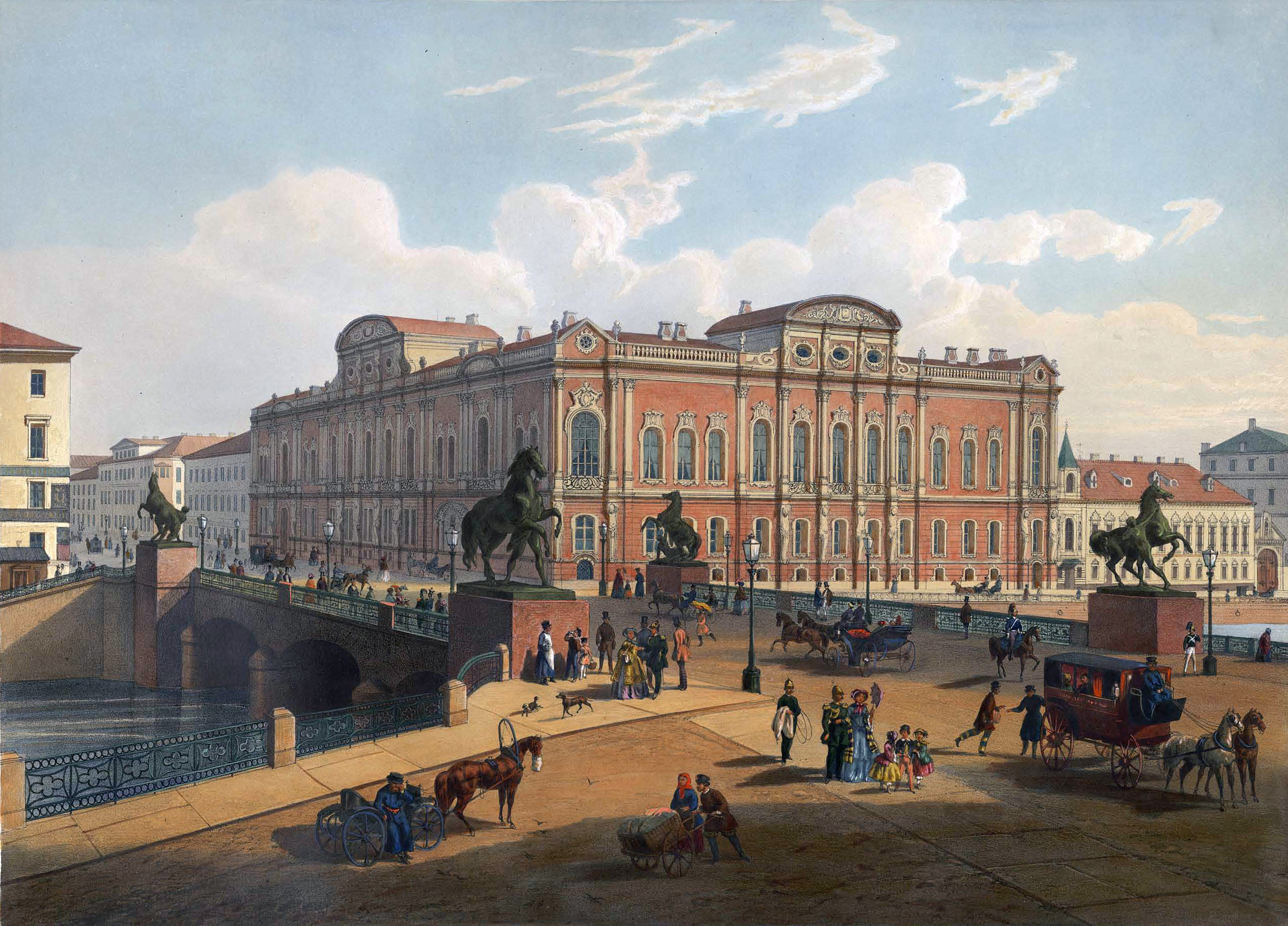
View across the bridge towards Beloselsky-Belozersky Palace (1850s).

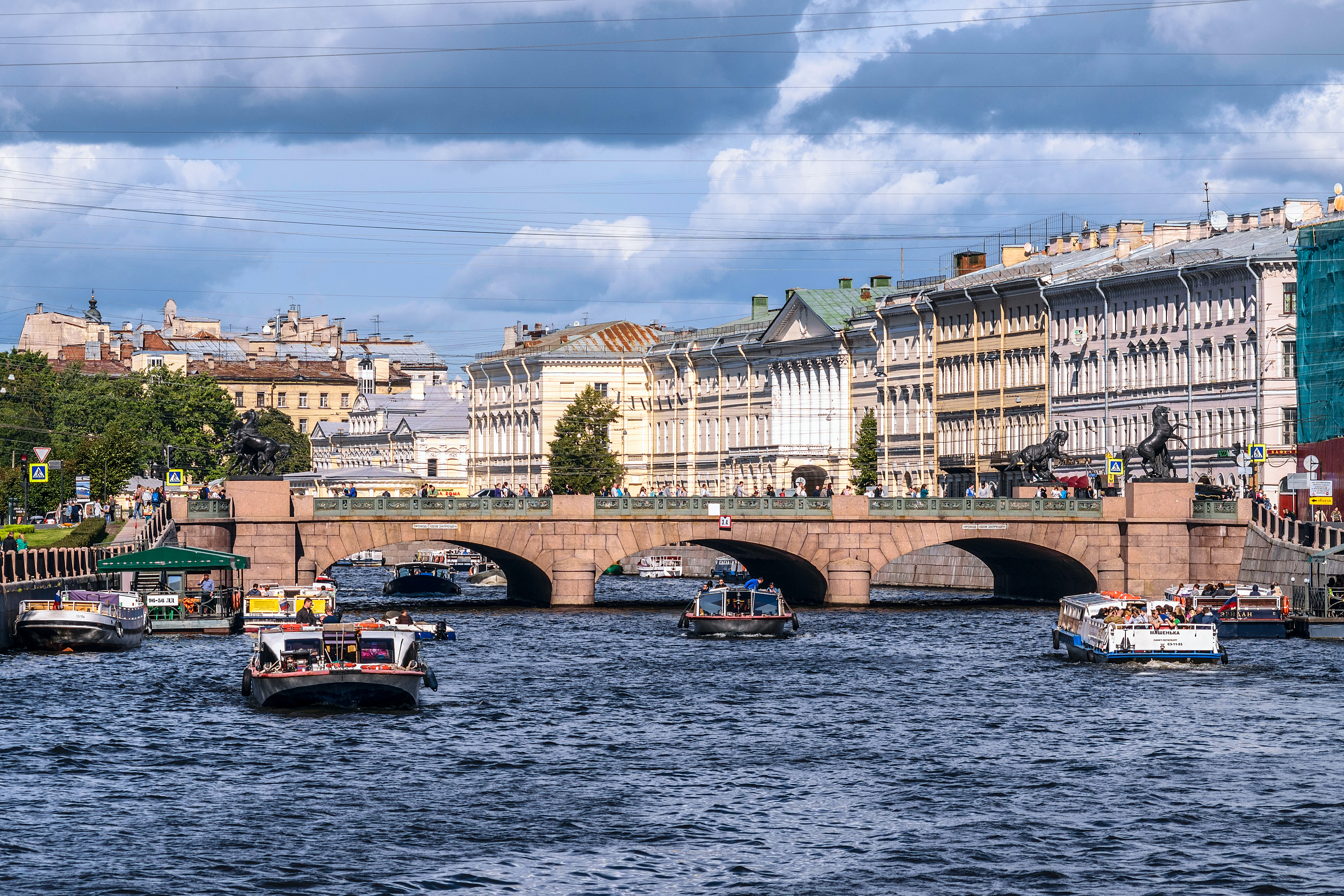
Anichkov Bridge in 2015.

The Anichkov Bridge (Russian: Аничков мост, Anichkov Most) is the oldest and most famous bridge across the Fontanka River in Saint Petersburg, Russia. The current bridge, built in 1841-42 and reconstructed in 1906-08, combines a simple form with some spectacular decorations. As well as its four famous horse sculptures (1849–50), the bridge has some of the most celebrated ornate iron railings in Saint Petersburg. The structure is mentioned in the works of Pushkin, Gogol, and Dostoevsky.

The first bridge was built in 1715-16 by order of Peter the Great, and named after its engineer, Mikhail Anichkov. The bridge was made of wood with several spans built on piles of supports lying just above the Fontanka River. It was designed by Domenico Trezzini. Nothing remains of this first bridge.

As the city grew and river traffic increased, plans were unveiled in 1721 to create a new drawbridge. The Anichkov Bridge was one of seven three-span stone drawbridges with towers built across the Fontanka River in the late 18th century, of which the Lomonosov Bridge and the Stary Kalinkin Bridge are the two still extant. At that time, the Anichkov Bridge was an especially popular attraction on Nevsky Prospekt, as well as a popular subject for illustrations and paintings.

By the 1840s the 18th-century design, especially its large towers, was deemed unsuitable for the growing amount of traffic passing over the Anichkov Bridge along Nevsky Prospekt. In 1841-42 a grander structure, more appropriate to the width of Nevsky Prospekt, was built on the site under the supervision of Lt. General A. D. Gotman. The new bridge was made of stone, and had three spans closed off with gently sloping arches. This simple, concise form corresponded well with the massive cast-iron fencing bordering Anichkov Bridge and mermaid cast-iron railings, originally designed by Karl Friedrich Schinkel for the Palace Bridge in Berlin. However, the bridge's stone arches were a continual source of problems, and in 1906-08 the bridge had once again to be reconstructed and its arches reinforced.

== The Horse Tamers ==
The Horse Tamers were designed by the Russian sculptor, Baron Peter Klodt von Jurgensburg and they rank among the city's most recognizable landmarks. The theme derives from the colossal Roman marbles, often identified with the Dioscuri, prominently sited on the Quirinal Hill, Rome. Guillaume Coustou's baroque marble horse tamers for Marly-le-Roi, the Chevaux de Marly, were resited at the opening to the Champs-Elysées, Paris, at the Revolution.

The St Petersburg sculptures have an interesting history. Prior to 1851, when the definitive versions were installed in the bridge, Tsar Nicholas I had given two of them to Prussian King Frederick William IV in 1842, and the other two had been sent in 1846 to Naples as a sign of gratitude for the hospitality shown to the Tsar during his trip there (see here and here). "Petersburg lore tells of Peter Klodt's death immediately upon embarrassing discovery that tongues had been omitted on two of the four sculptural horses". Another urban legend has it that Klodt depicted his powerful enemy's face under the tail of one of the bronze stallions.

In 1941, during the Second World War, when the bridge came under heavy fire from German artillery, the sculptures were removed from their platforms and buried in the nearby Anichkov Palace garden. The bridge suffered serious damage during the war, but has been fully restored. As a memorial, the pedestal of one of the statues retains the effects of artillery fire, with a plaque explaining this to passersby. Prior to the tercentenary of Saint Petersburg, the statues were removed from the bridge again and underwent thorough restoration.

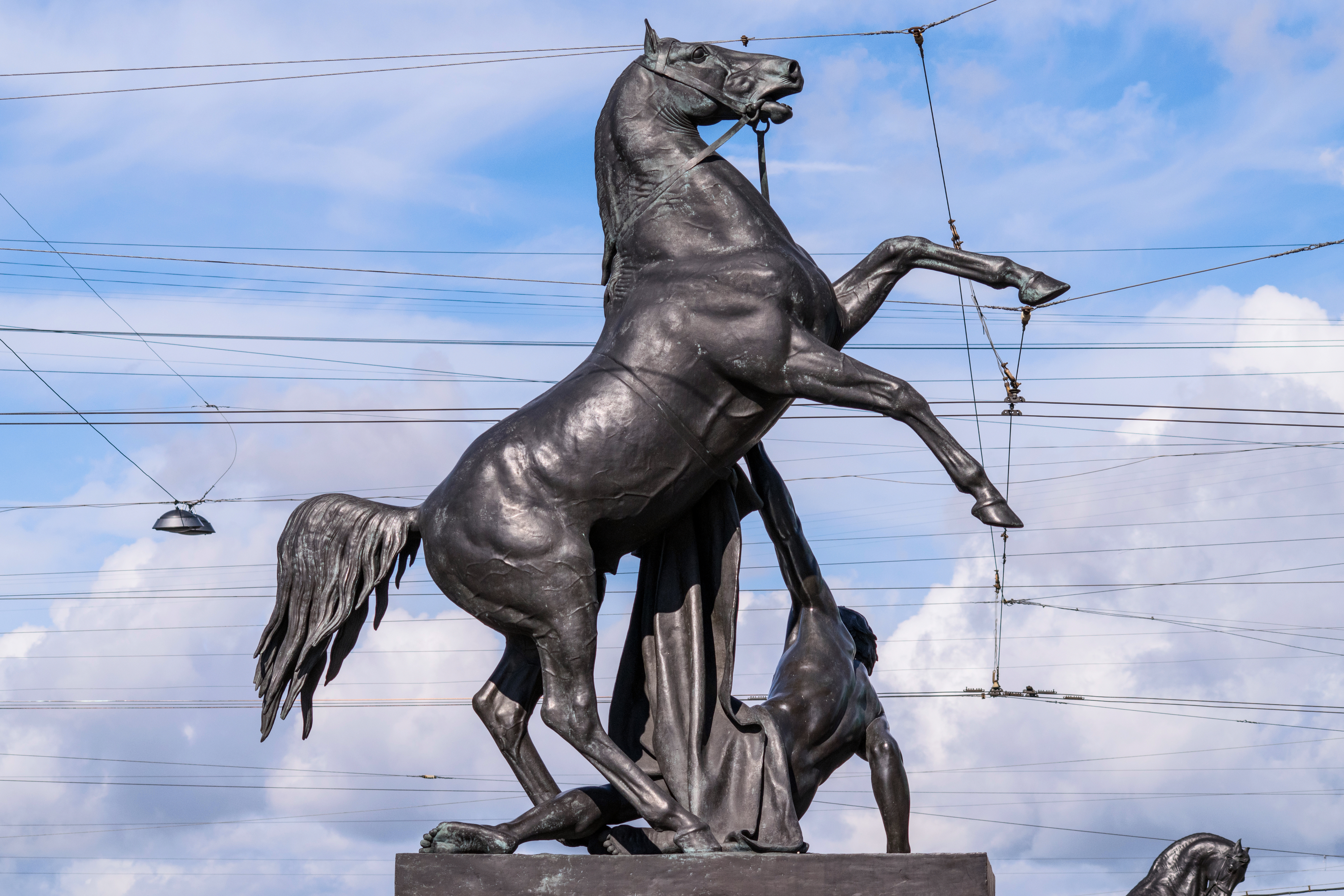

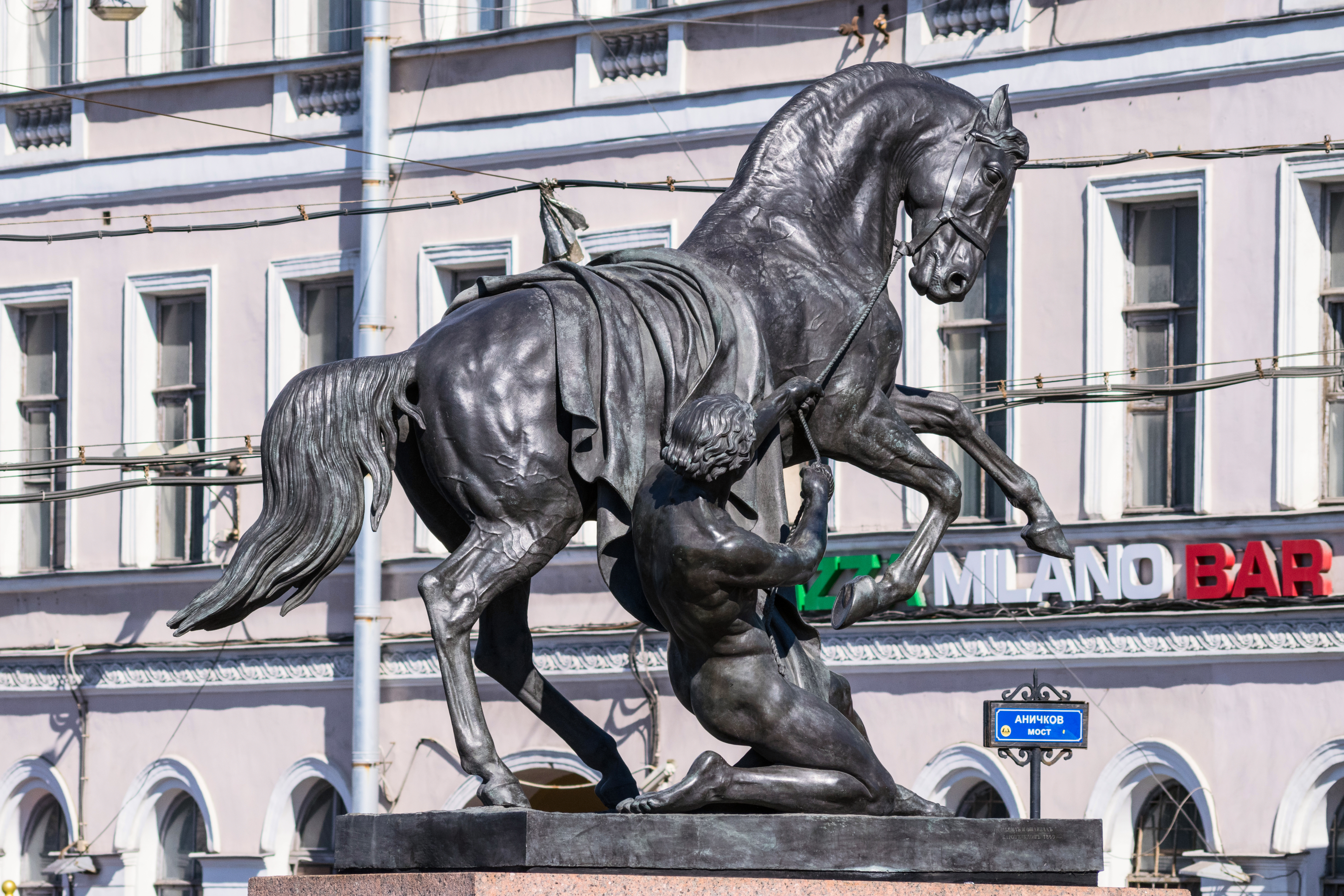

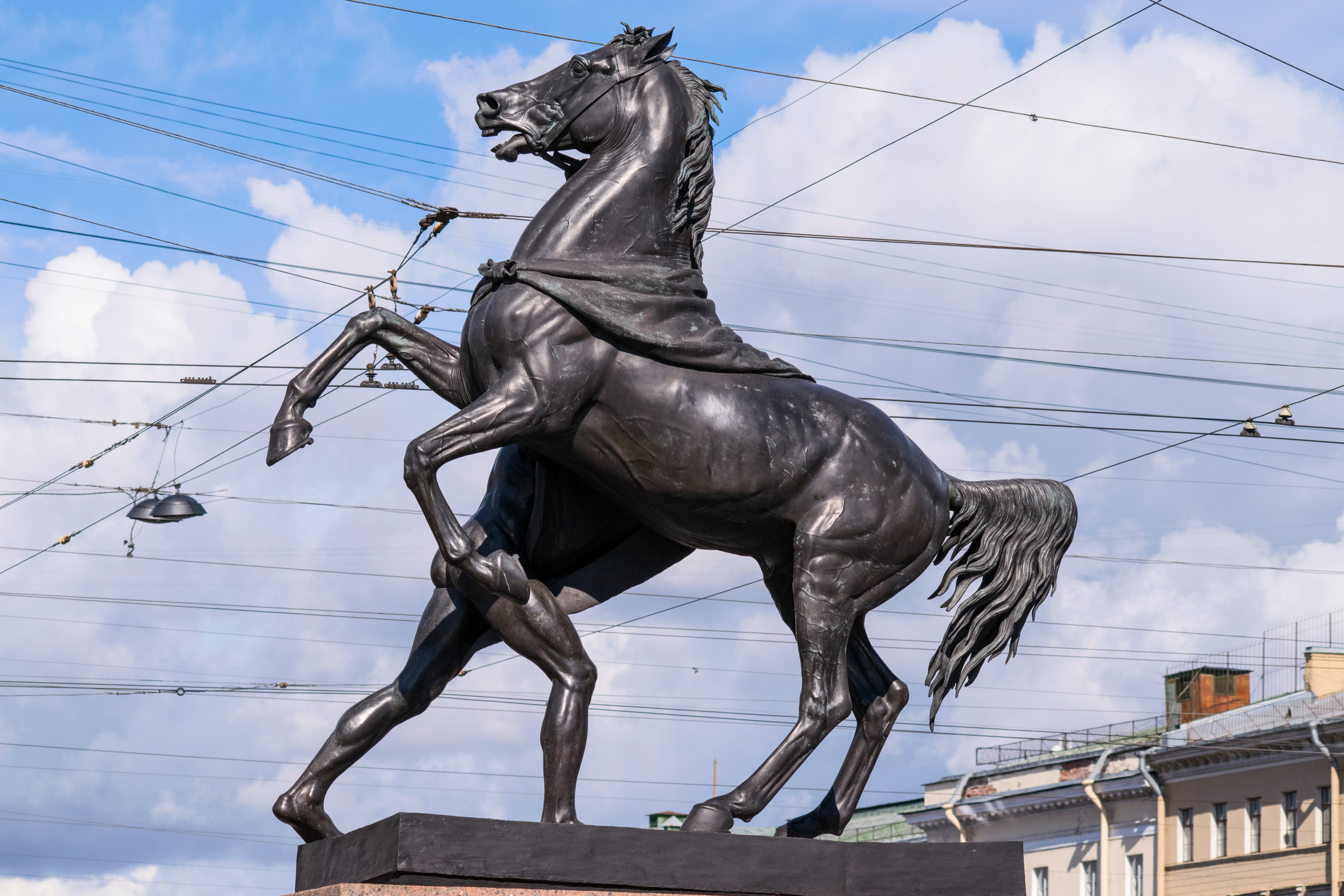

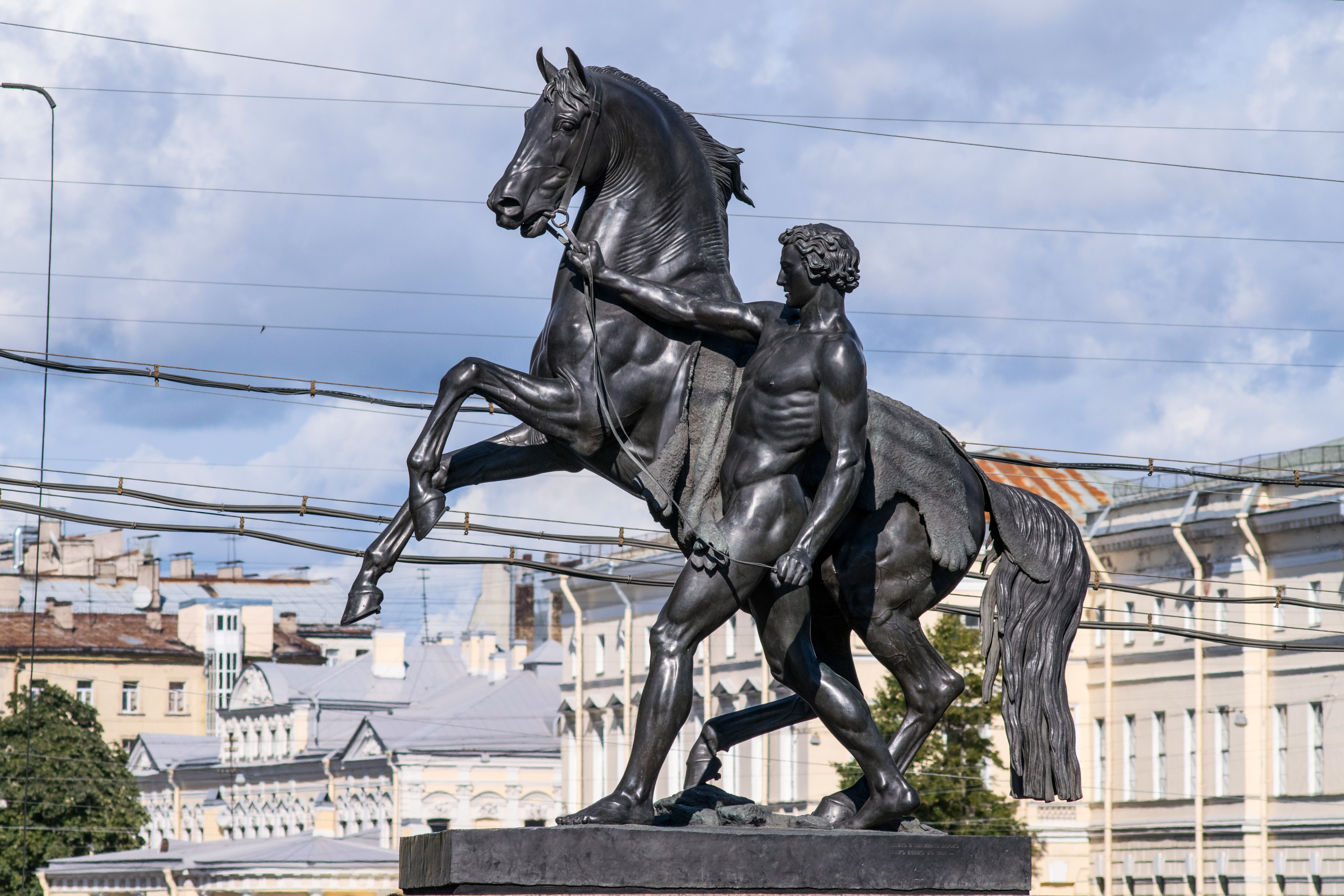
