= Anna Sorokina =

Anna Sorokina may refer to:

- Anna Sorokina (actress) (born 1981), Russian stage, film, and television actress
- Anna Sorokina (biathlon) (born 1981), Russian biathlete
- Anna Sorokin (born 1991), Russian-born German convicted fraudster
- Anna Kulinich-Sorokina (born 1992), Russian Paralympian athlete.
