= Peter Clodt von Jürgensburg =

Russian sculptor (1805–1867)

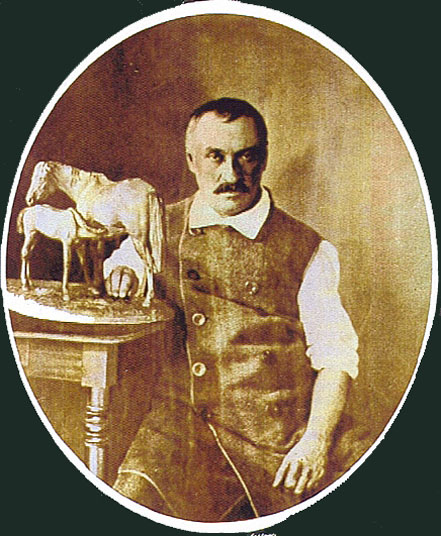
Peter Clodt von Jürgensburg

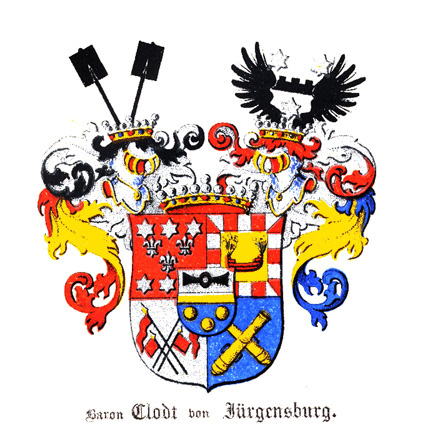
Coat of arms of the baronial Clodt von Jürgensburg family of 1714, in the Baltic Coat of arms book by Carl Arvid von Klingspor in 1882.

Peter Jakob Freiherr (Note: Regarding personal names: Freiherr is a former title (translated as Baron). In Germany since 1919, it forms part of family names. The feminine forms are Freifrau and Freiin.) Clodt von Jürgensburg (Russian: Пётр Карлович Клодт, romanized: Pyotr Karlovich Klodt; 5 June 1805 – 25 November 1867) was a Russian sculptor of noble Baltic German origin. He was well regarded by Nicholas I of Russia.

== Biography ==
Born in Saint Petersburg, Klodt belonged to a distinguished family of Baltic Germans, the Clodt von Jürgensburgs. The family's origin remains unknown, but it has been speculated that it originated in Westphalia. Klodt started his career as a professional artillery officer and amateur sculptor. He attended classes at the Imperial Academy of Arts in Saint Petersburg, where his mastery in depicting horses eventually won him the rank of academician and the praise of the Emperor. As legend has it, Nicholas I remarked of Klodt that he "creates horses finer than any prize stallion does".

Klodt's most famous group of equestrian statues, the Horse Tamers, was installed at the Anichkov Bridge in 1851. He also produced the bronze statue of Ivan Krylov in the Summer Garden (1848–55). It was the first monument to a poet erected in the Russian Empire.

Klodt collaborated with Vasily Demut-Malinovsky on the statue of Saint Vladimir in Kiev (installed in 1853) and the statuary for the Narva Triumphal Gate. He also sculpted a quadriga above the portico of the Bolshoi Theatre in Moscow.

Klodt's last significant work was a posthumous tribute to his patron, a horse statue for the equestrian Monument to Nicholas I on Saint Isaac's Square. Installed in 1856–1859, it was the first equestrian statue in the world with only two support-points (the rear feet of the horse). Even the Bolsheviks, who destroyed the memorials to Nicholas I across Russia, did not dare to demolish this unique statue.

Klodt died in his estate in the Grand Duchy of Finland within the Russian Empire on 20 November 1867. His son and nephew Mikhail continued the artistic traditions of the family and became notable painters of the Peredvizhniki school.

== Gallery ==
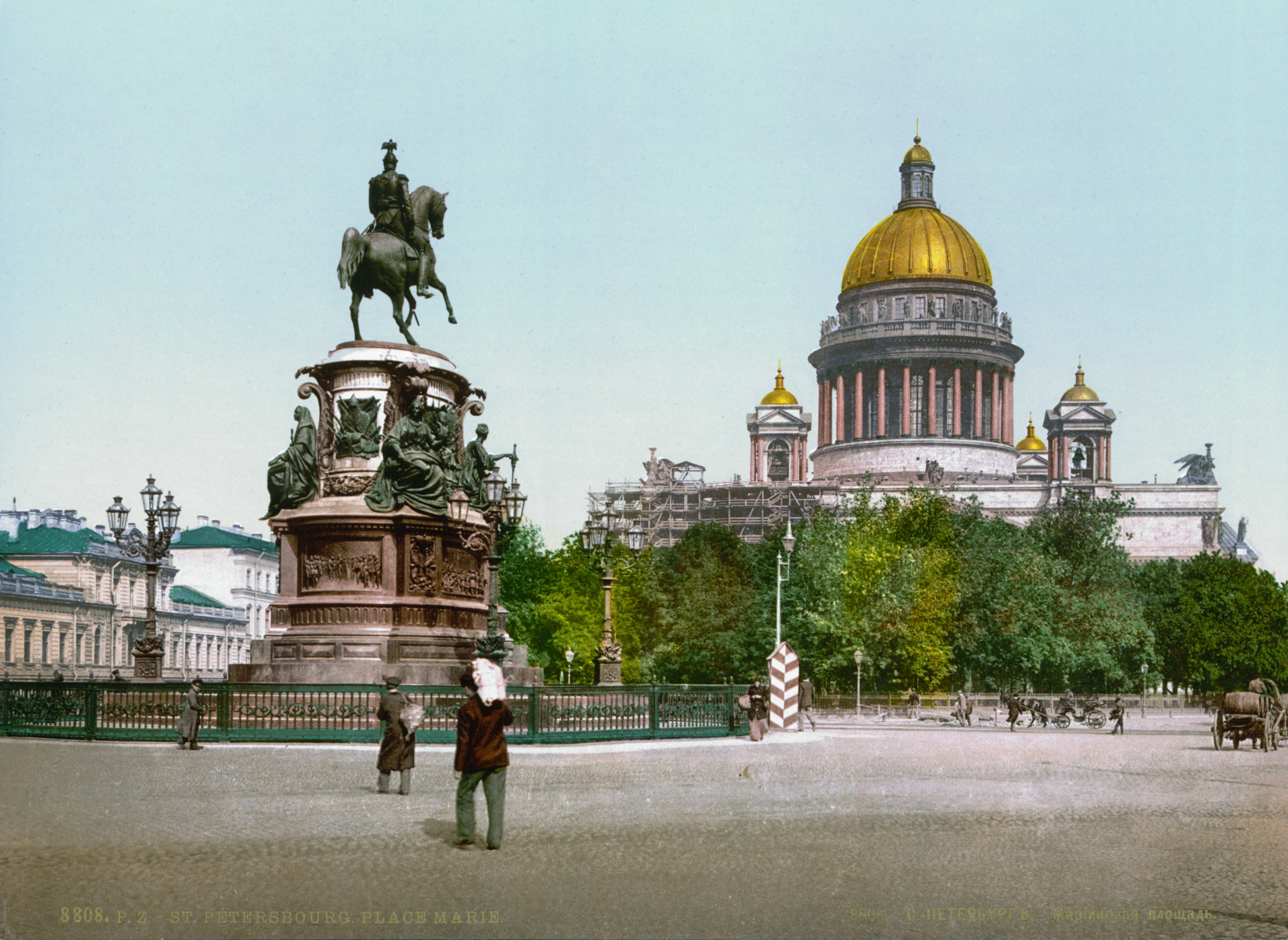
The monument to Nicholas I of Russia in St. Petersburg, late 19th century photochrome print.

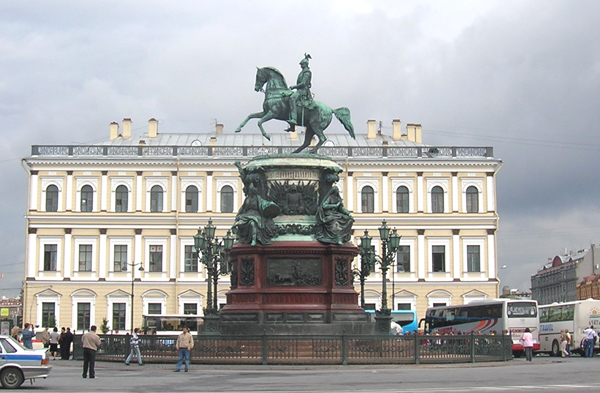
The monument to Nicholas I of Russia, modern view.

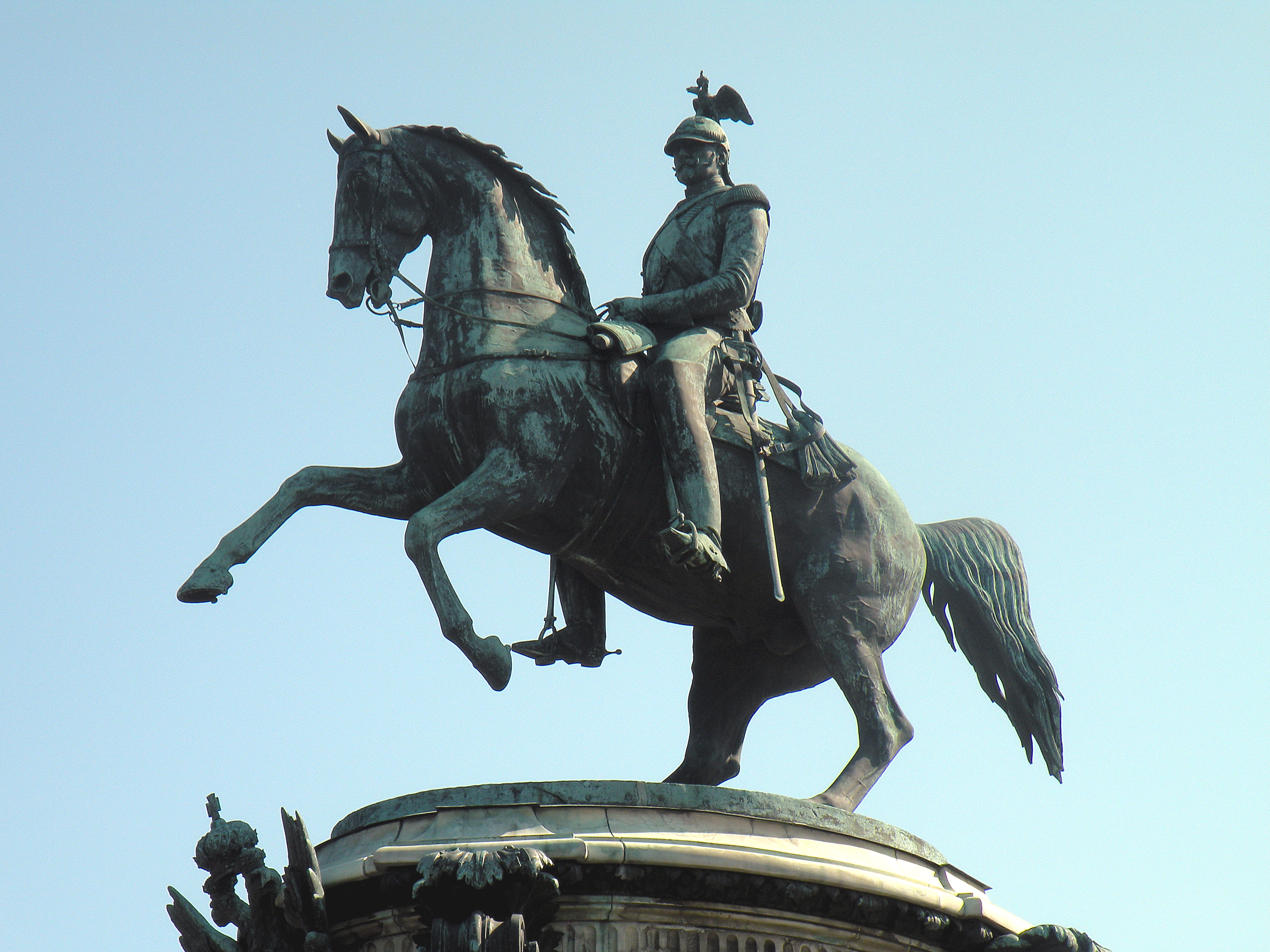
The monument to Nicholas I of Russia, close-up.

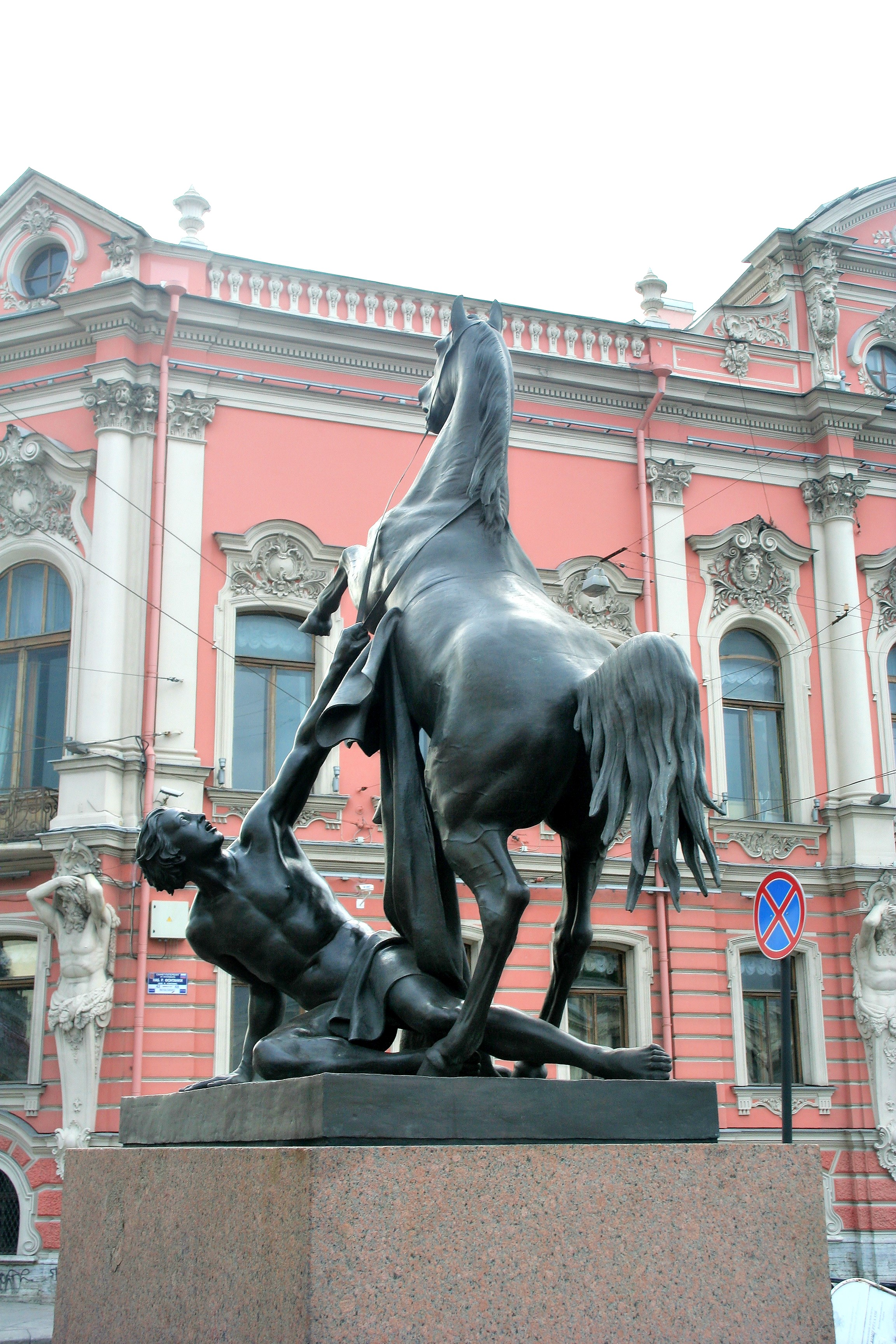
One of the horse tamers on the Anichkov Bridge, St. Petersburg.

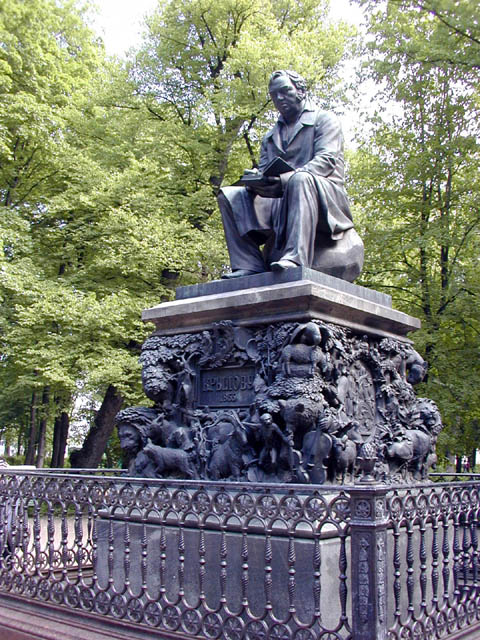
The statue of Ivan Krylov in the Summer Garden in Saint Petersburg.

== See also ==
- Kasli iron sculpture

== Sources ==
- "Клодт фон Юргенсбург, русские художники" . Brockhaus and Efron Encyclopedic Dictionary (in Russian). 1906.
- Klingspor, Carl Arvid (1882). Baltic heraldic coat of arms all, belonging to the knighthoods of Livonia, Estonia, Courland and Oesel noble families.
