= Valeri Sorokin =

Valeri Sorokin may refer to:

- Valeri Sorokin (footballer, born 1985), Russian football midfielder for Dynamo Moscow, Nizhny Novgorod, FC Brussels, Gents, Tubize, Dynamo Bryansk, Tom Tomsk, SKA-Khabarovsk, Solyaris Moscow, Tambov, and Zorky Krasnogorsk
- Valeri Sorokin (footballer, born 1987), Russian football midfielder for Dynamo Kirov, Amur, Nosta Novotroitsk, Spartak Kostroma, and Dynamo Bryansk
