= Mikhail Clodt von Jürgensburg =

Russian painter (1832–1902)

- Михаил Клодт фон Юргенсбург
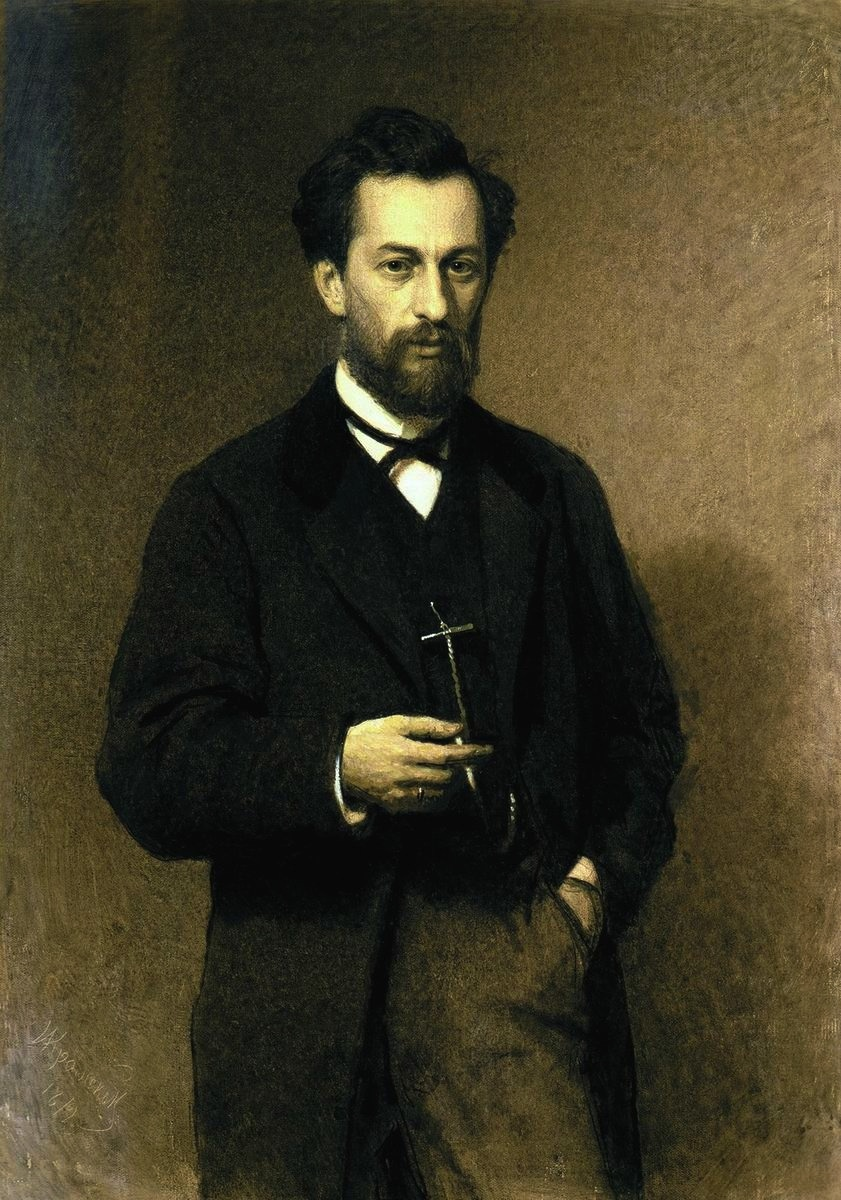
- Portrait by Ivan Kramskoi, 1871
- Born: 30 December 1832; Saint Petersburg, Russia
- Died: 16 May 1902 (aged 69); Saint Petersburg, Russia
- Education: Member Academy of Arts (1861); Professor by rank (1864)
- Alma mater: Imperial Academy of Arts (1858)
- Known for: Painting
- Awards: Big Gold Medal of the Imperial Academy of Arts (1858)

Mikhail Konstantinovich Clodt, Freiherr (Baron) von Jürgensburg (Russian: Михаил Константинович Клодт фон Юргенсбург; 30 December 1832 [O.S. 11 January 1833] – 29 May [O.S. 16 May] 1902) was a Russian realist painter.

== Biography ==
Mikhail Clodt was born to the artistic family of barons Clodt von Jürgensburg, his father Konstantin Clodt was the first Russian wood engraver, his uncle Peter Clodt von Jürgensburg was a famous Russian sculptor.

He learnt drawing at the Saint Petersburg Mining Cadet Corps, then at the Imperial Academy of Arts (1851–1858). After receiving a Large Gold Medal he received a scholarship for three years to study painting in France, Switzerland and Italy but abandoned his foreign trip in a year. He complained that the foreign landscapes would not inspire him and that French and Italian school of painting is inferior to Russian one. After returning Clodt got permissions to use the rest of the scholarship funds in his travel over Russia.

In 1863 Clodt got recognition for his painting Highway in Autumn. Even higher praise was given for his work In the Field (1872) and the Forest view in Midday (1878). Observers celebrated his devotion to Russian landscape, attention to the details and perspective. On the other hand, popular art critic Vladimir Stasov noted petty naturalism and the "slavish following to reality" in many Clodt works. As an example of such a work he stated Cows at Watering (1879). In both his devotion to the Russian landscape and some petty naturalism Clodt was probably the forerunner of Ivan Shishkin.

Mikhail Clodt was a founding member of the Peredvizhniki movement, but the Peredvizhniki did not completely consider him as their own. That was partially due to the sharp criticisms from Clodt and partially because of him keeping his professorship of the Imperial Academy of Arts (1871–1886). After Clodt's particularly sharp criticism over Arkhip Kuindzhi Clodt was forced to break with the Peredvizhniki. Soon he retired from the Academy as well.

Clodt did not paint anything of value after the 1870s. Half-blind and financially broken, he died in 1902.

== Selected paintings ==
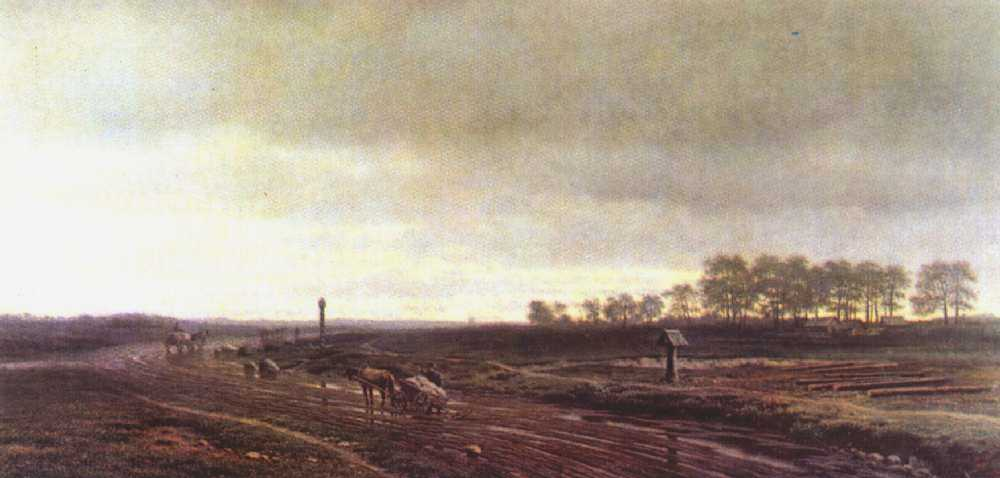
A Highway in Autumn, 1863

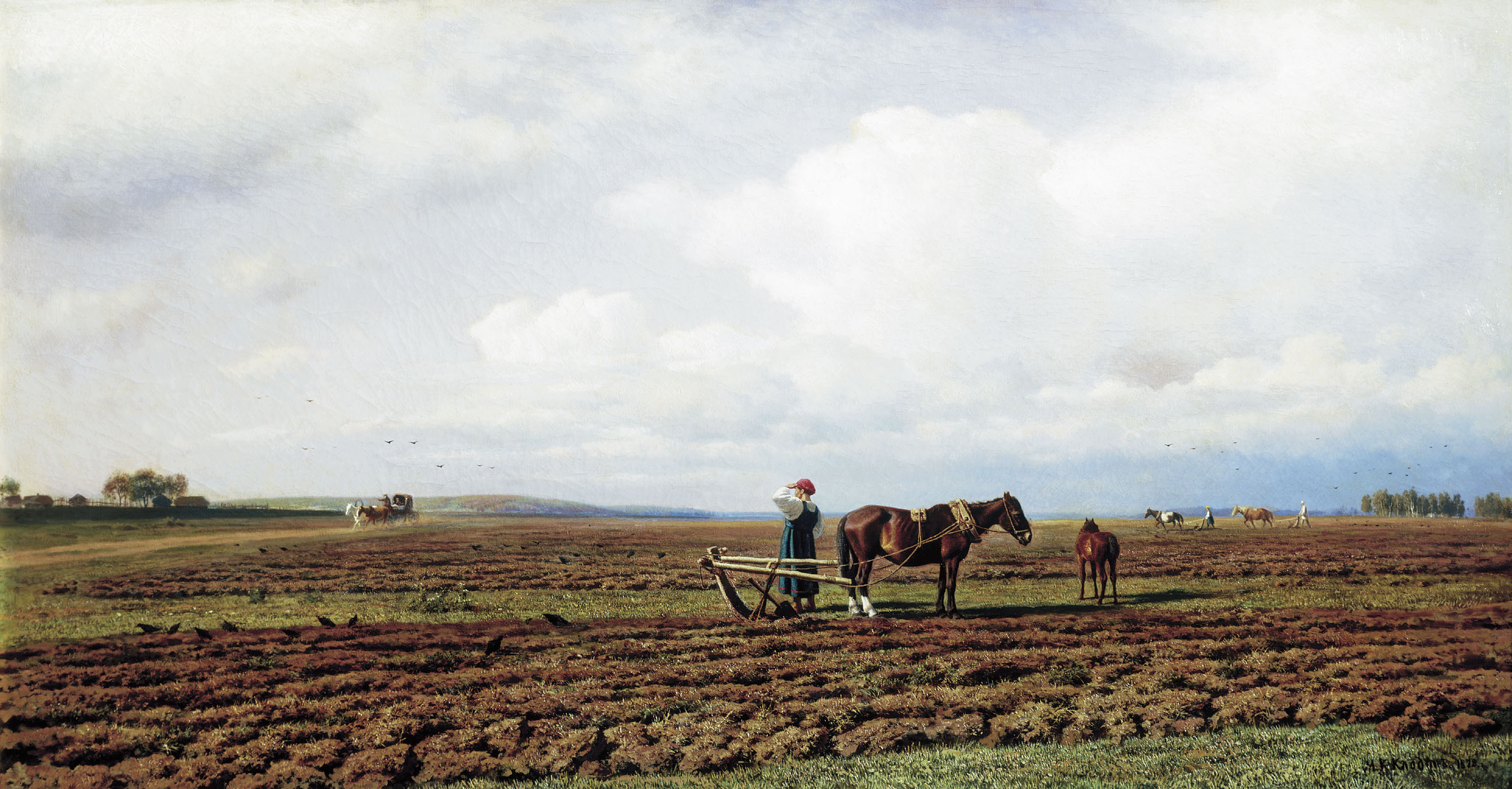
In the Fields, 1872

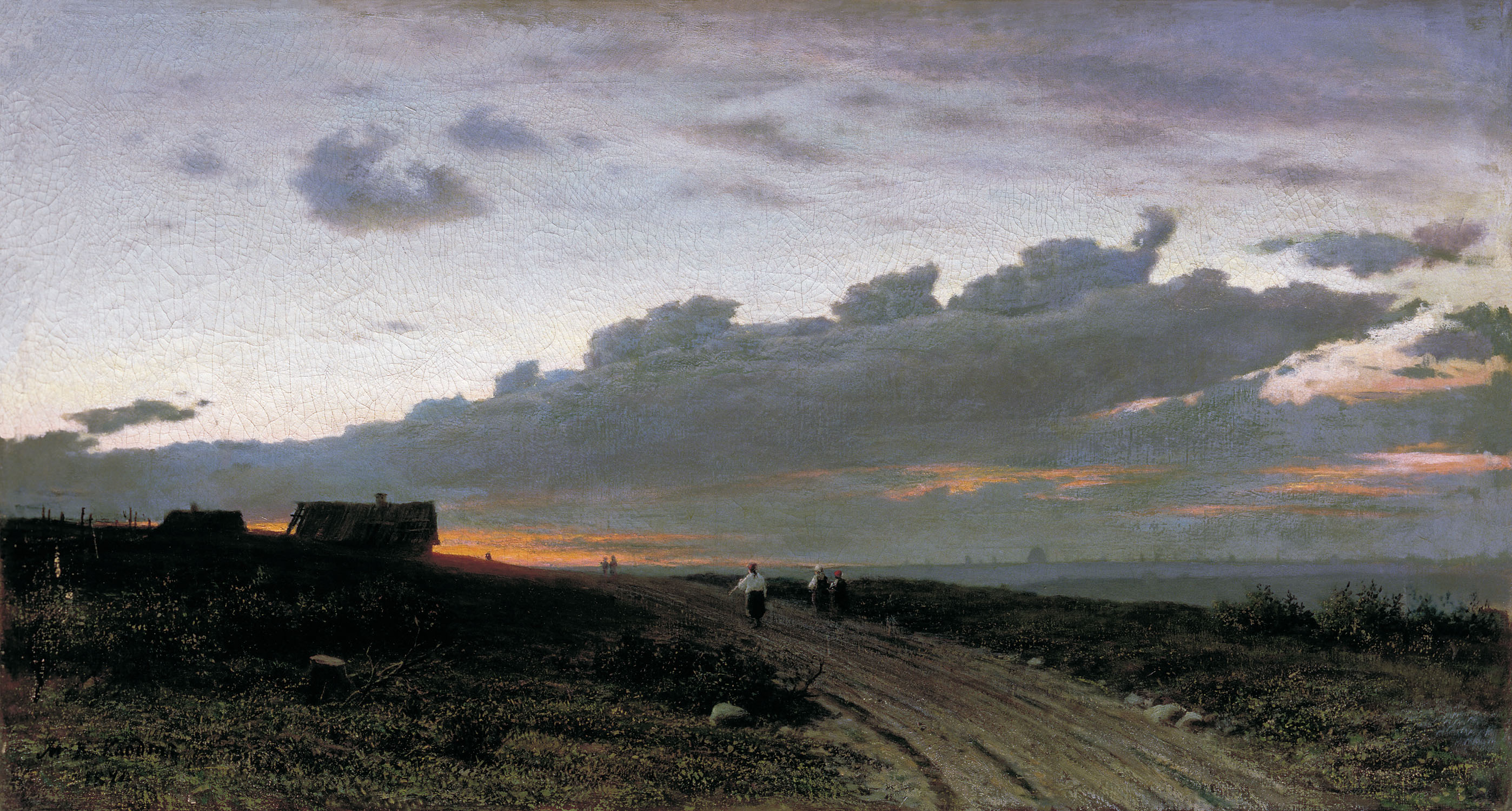
Evening View in a Village.
Oryol Gubernia, 1874

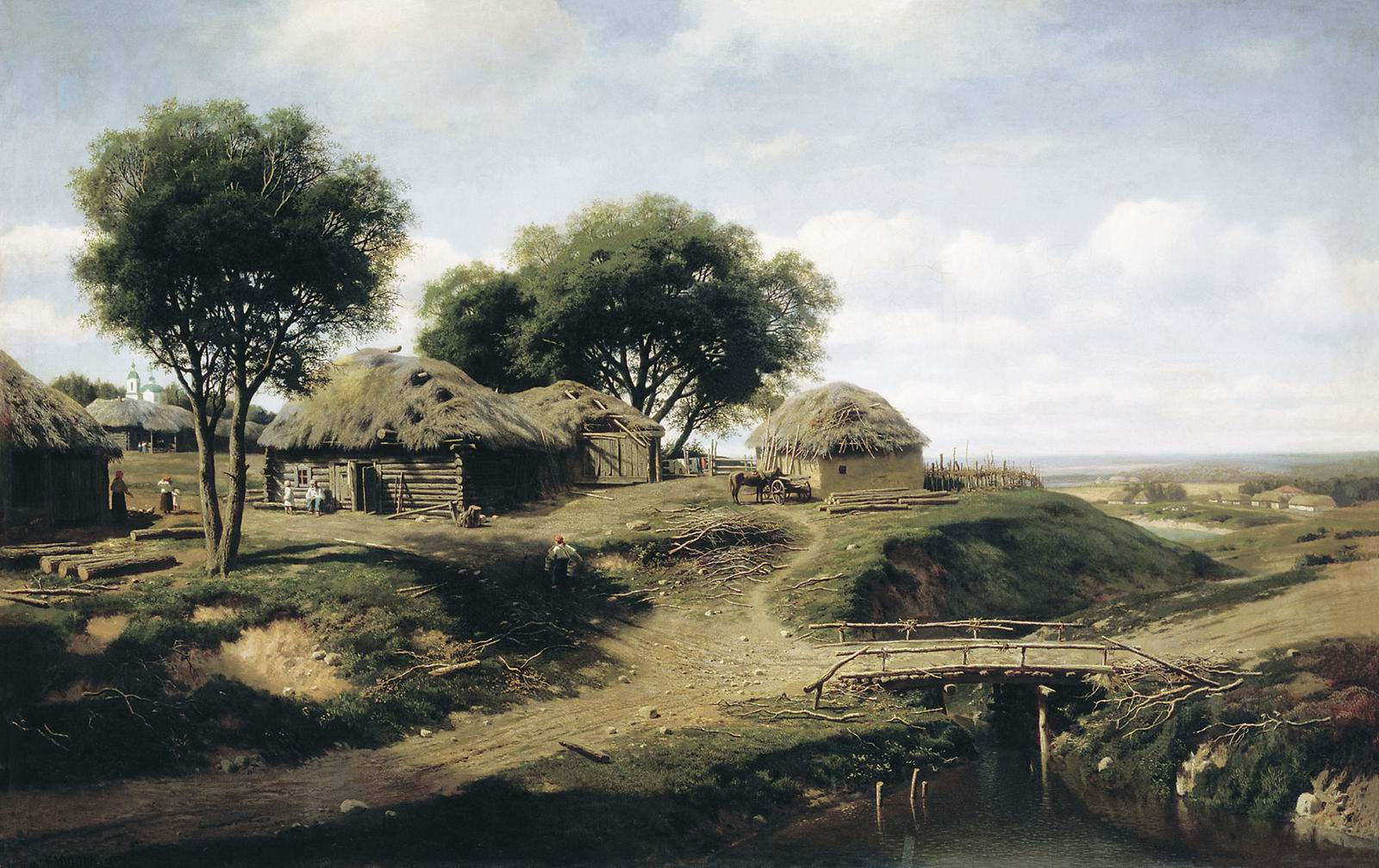
Village in the Oryol Gubernia, 1864

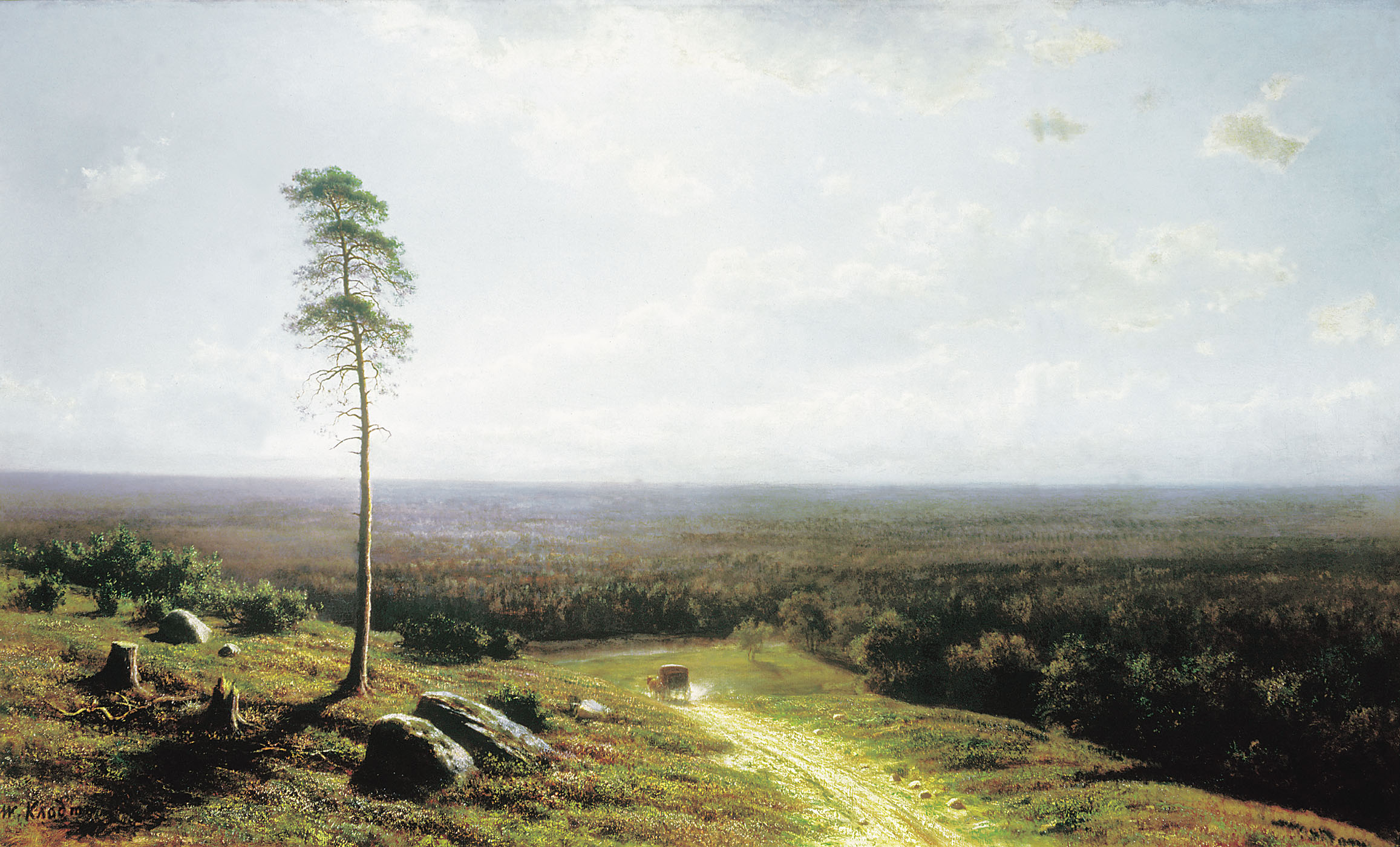
Forest View at Mid-day, 1878

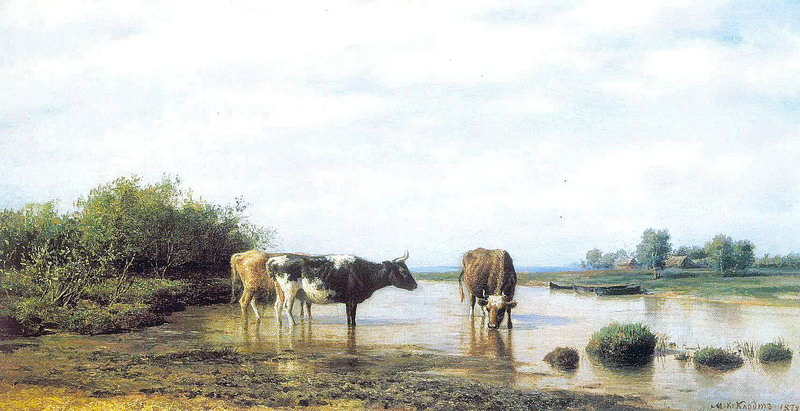
Cows at Watering, 1879

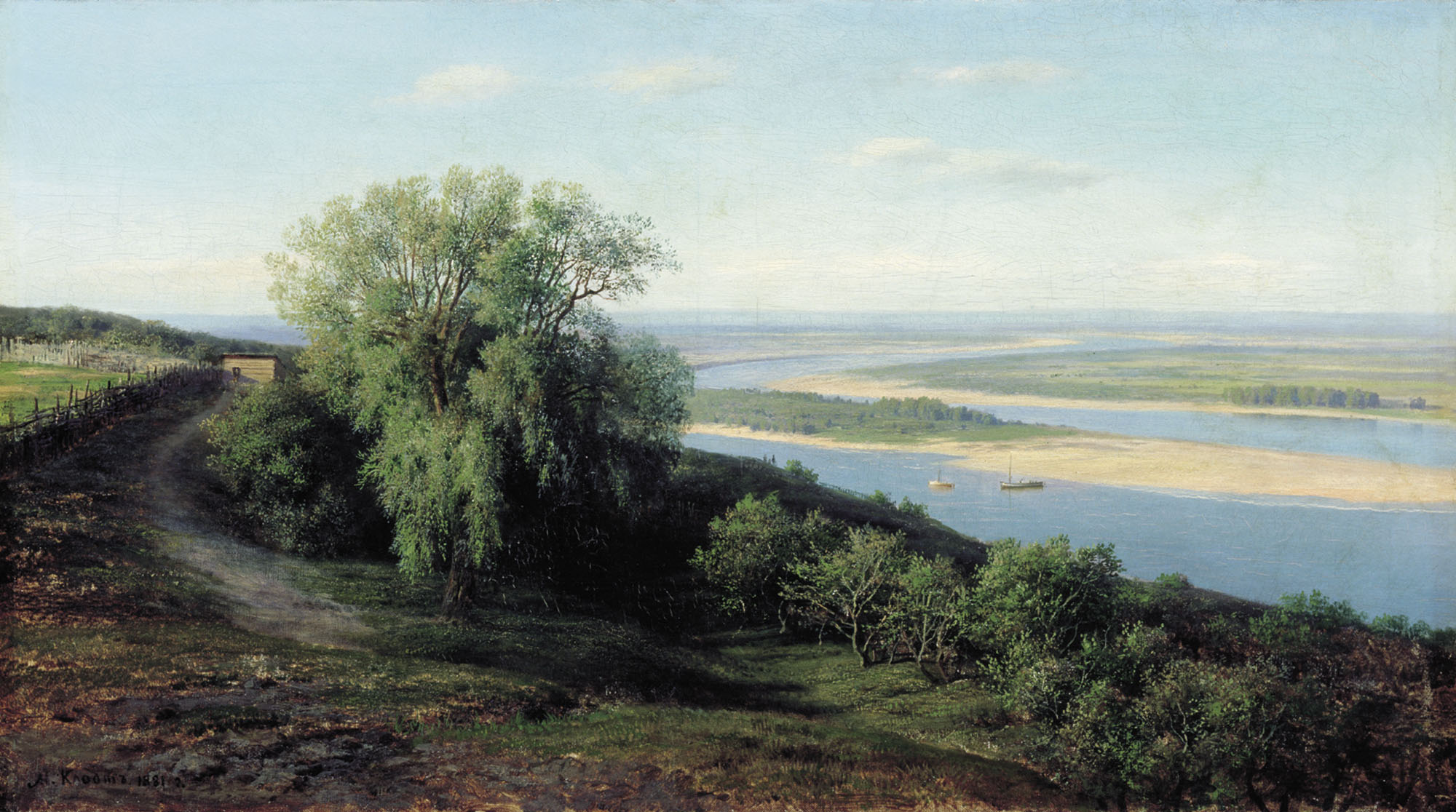
Volga near Simbirsk, 1881

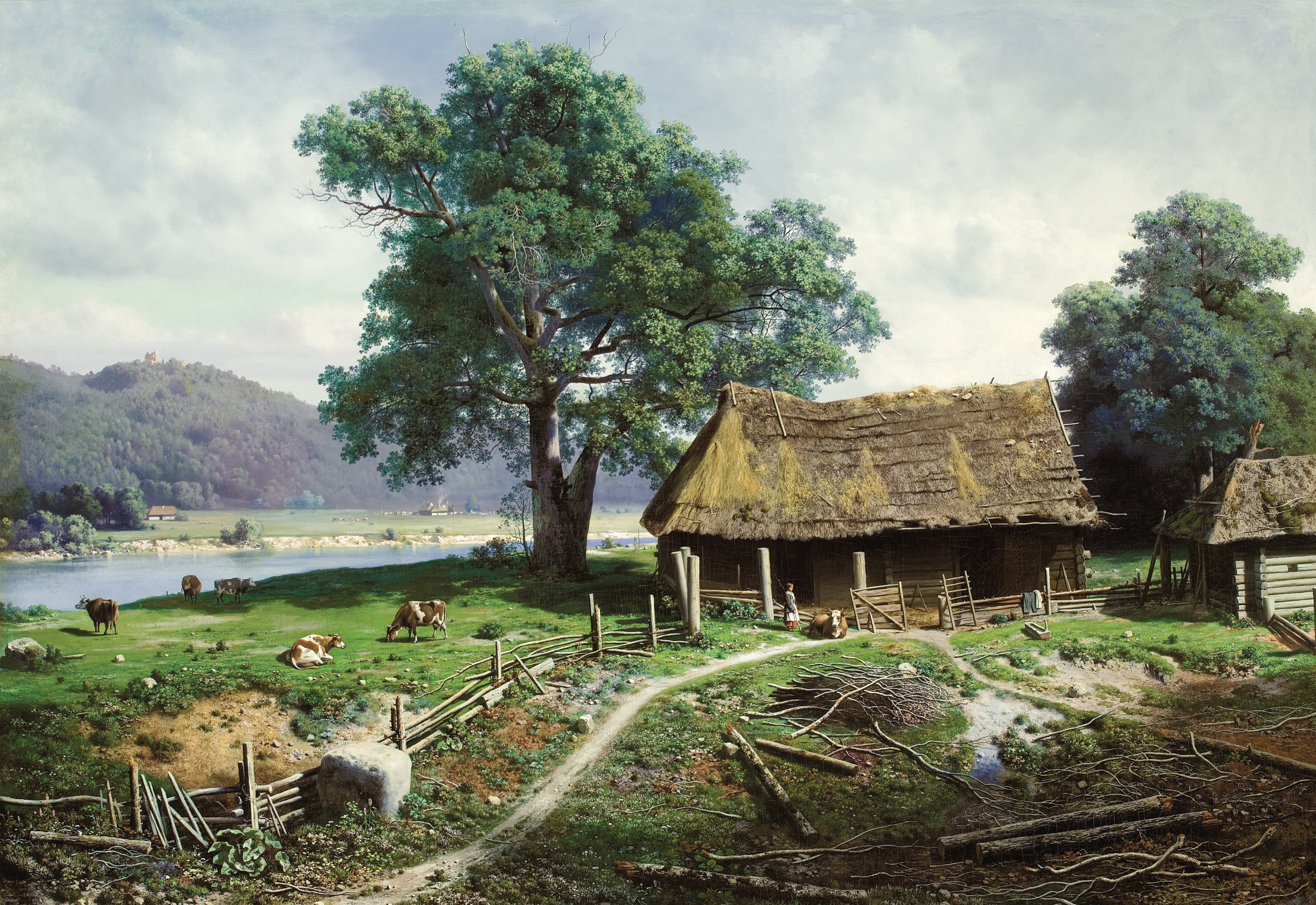
View at the estate/homestead near Riga, 1858

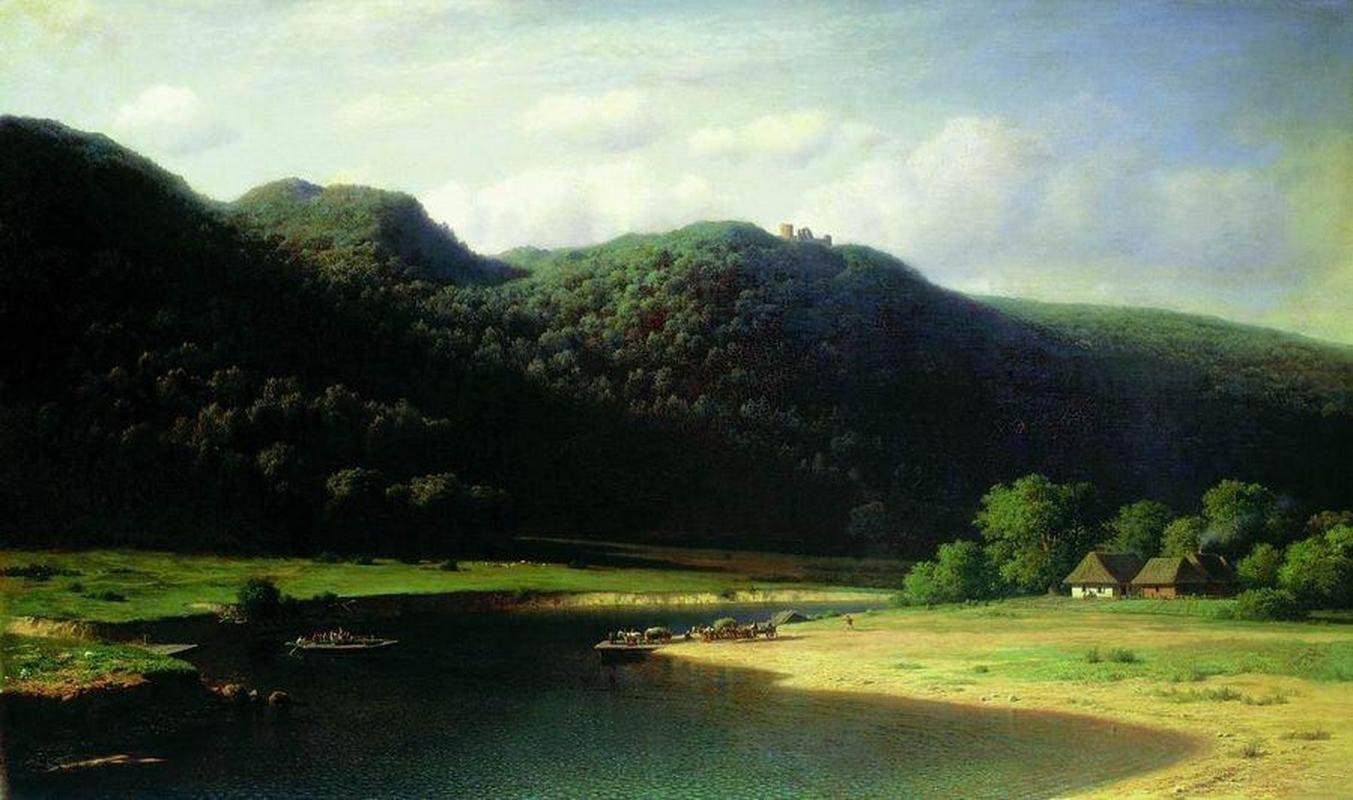
Aa River Valley in Livland, 1862 – Russian Museum

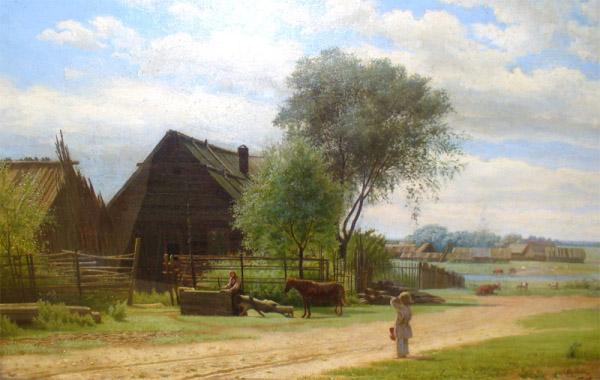
Russian Village, 1867

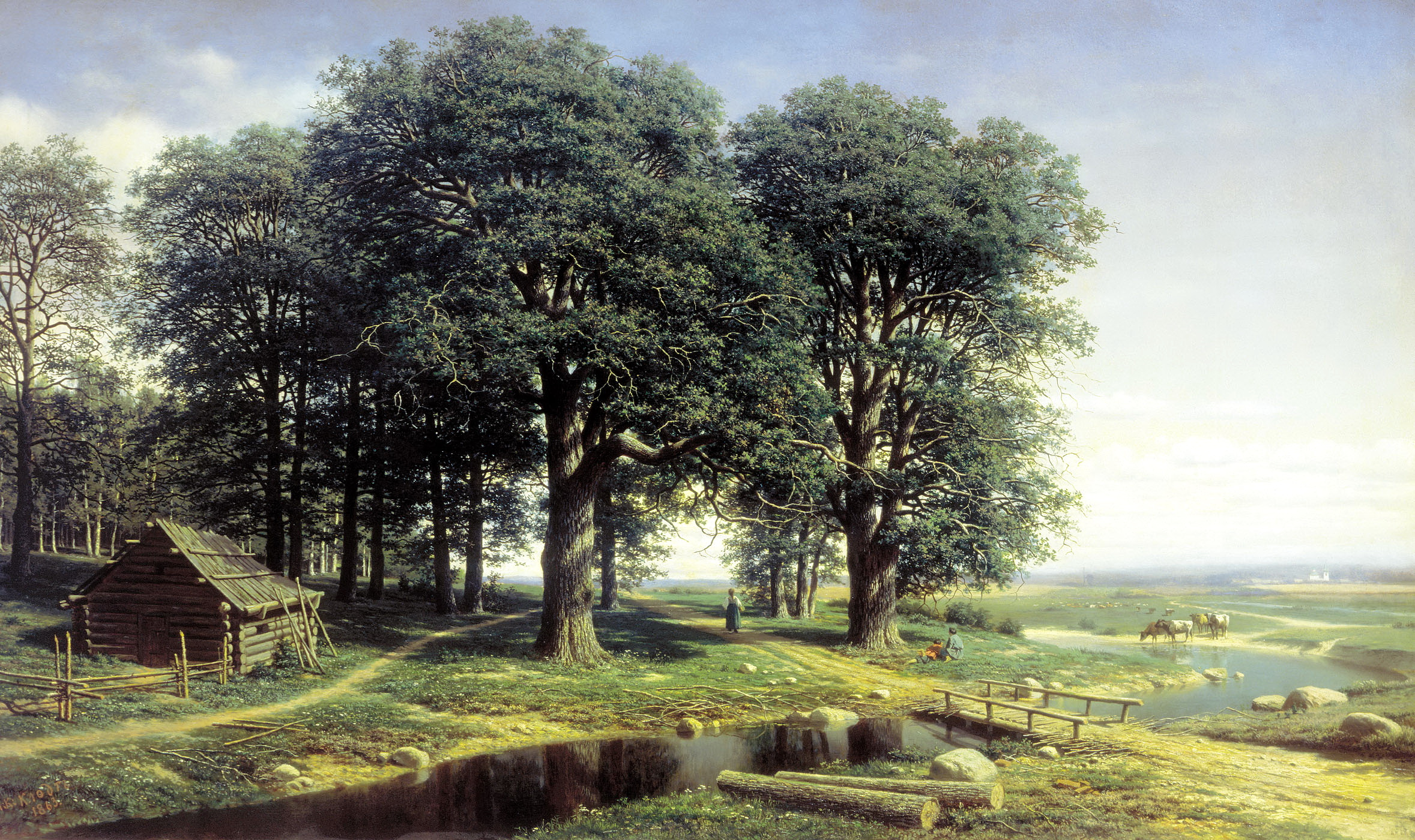
Oak Grove, 1863 – Tretyakov Gallery

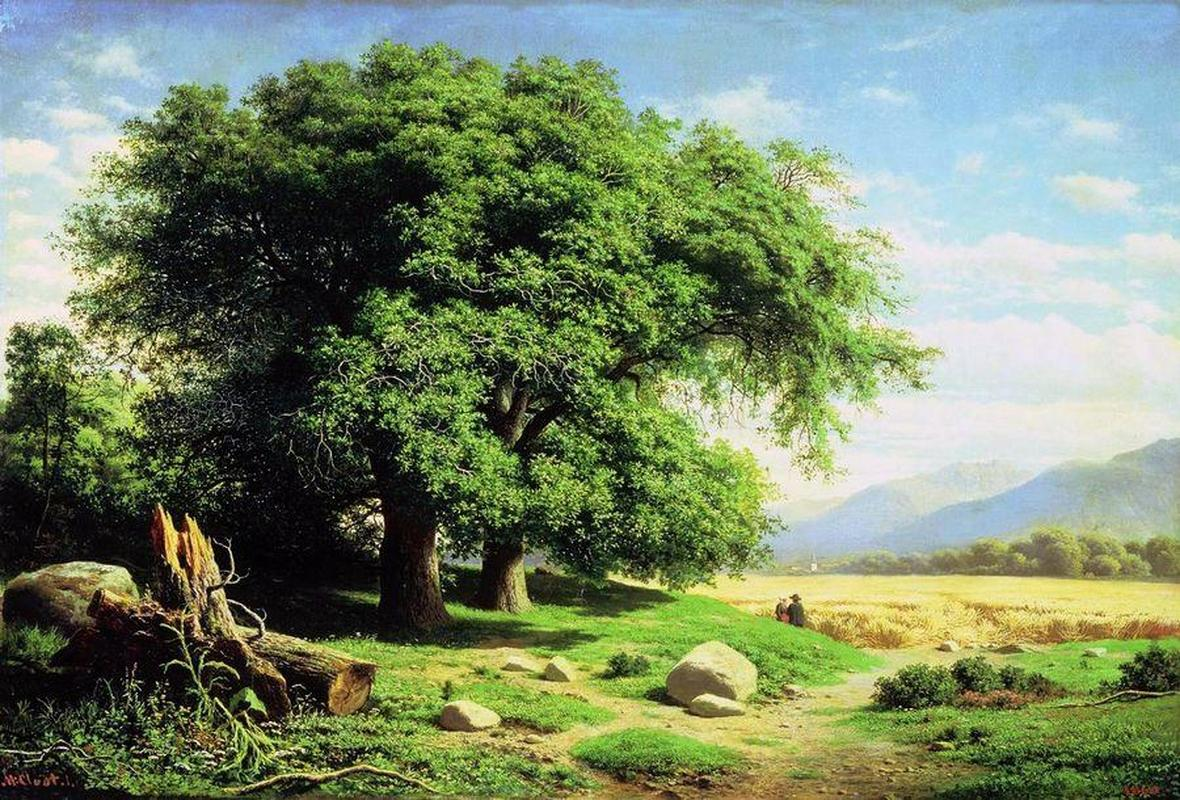
View in Normandy (Summer Day), 1860

== Sources ==
- "Клодт фон Юргенсбург, русские художники" . Brockhaus and Efron Encyclopedic Dictionary (in Russian). 1906.
- "Klodt von Jurgensburg, Mikhail Konstantinovich (Baron)". Benezit Dictionary of Artists. 2011.
