= Vadim Sorokin =

Russian businessman, mechanical engineer and inventor

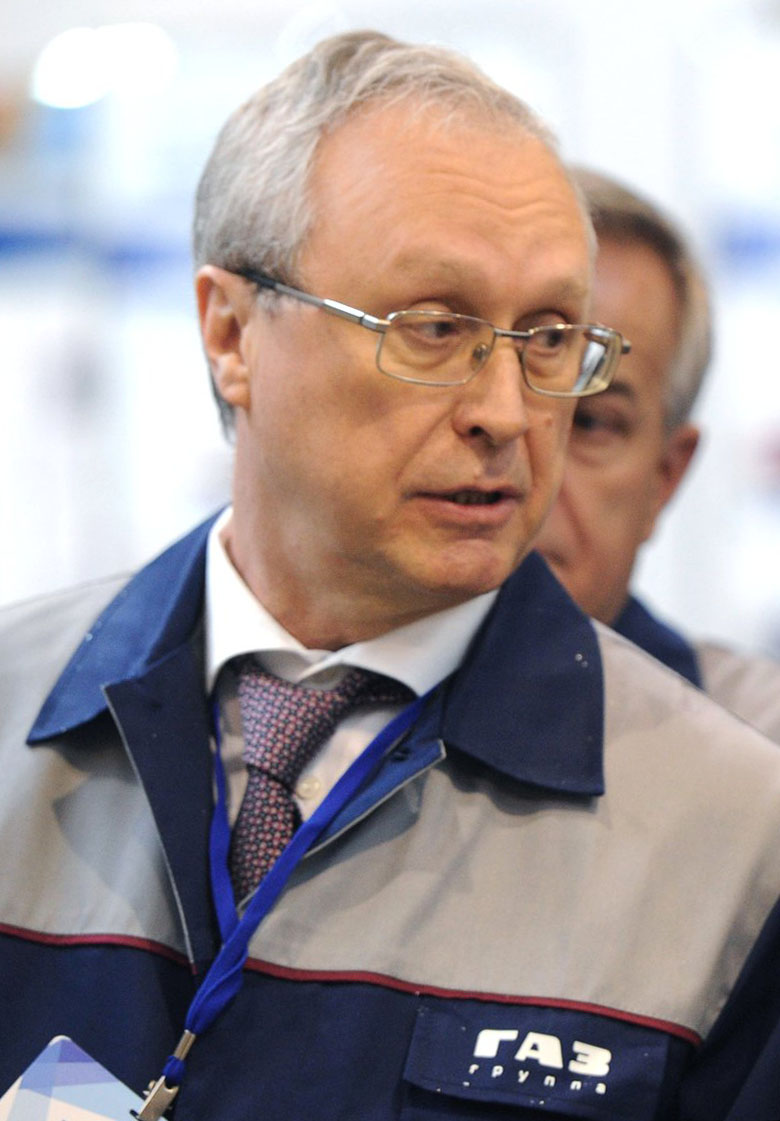
- Born: Vadim Nikolayevich Sorokin; 13 June 1956 (age 69); Pavlovo, Gorky Oblast, Russian Soviet Federative Socialist Republic, USSR
- Occupations: mechanical engineer, businessman, inventor
- Years active: since 1978
- Known for: GAZ Group president and CEO; 31 patents owner
- Spouse: Olga Sorokin
- Children: 1

Vadim Nikolayevich Sorokin (Russian: Вадим Николаевич Сорокин, born 13 June 1956 in Pavlovo) is a Russian businessman, mechanical engineer and inventor. He holds the posts of the president and the CEO of GAZ Group.

== Early age ==
He was born on 13 June 1956 in Pavlovo, Gorky Oblast. In 1975 he graduated from Pavlovo Auto Mechanical Technical College, in 1983 he graduated from Gorky Polytechnical Institute with a major in Engineering Technology, Machinery and Instruments as a mechanical engineer. In 1995 he took courses in Ingersoll-Rand.

== Career ==
Since 1978 he had been working as a design engineer in Mechinstrument Design Bureau, department of the same scientific and production organization in Pavlovo. He led Mechinstrument in 1986 and became the CEO of Mechsborka enterprise in 1991. In 1993 he became the deputy of CEO and CEO of Instrum-Rand, Russian-American joint enterprise based on Mechinstrument. Later it was transformed into Ingersoll Rand public stock company, the Russian branch of Ingersoll-Rand, the American transnational corporation. In 1996 he became the CEO of Instrum-Rand private stock company (Pavlovo, Nizhny Novgorod Oblast).

From 27 November 2002 till 6 August 2009 Sorokin was the CEO of Mechsborka public stock company, in 2008 he joined the GAZ Group as the first deputy of chairman of the board. In 2009 he became the head of Light Commercial Vehicles and Passenger Cars Department of GAZ Group, where he developed new models of GAZ cars. In 2010 he became responsible for the development strategy: thanks to Sorokin's activity in advancing best practical decisions Group GAZ reached the new standards.

On 31 December 2013 Sorokin was appointed the president and the CEO of Gaz Group. The production of new generation cars was arranged, modern production technologies were introduced, the geographical range of sales was widened. New export models for neighbouring countries and beyond were created.

=== Invention activity ===
As an inventor, Sorokin owns 31 patents.

== Awards ==
- Russian Federation Presidential Certificate of Honour (2018)

== Personal life ==
Sorokin is married and has a daughter.

== Sources ==
- Bio on GAZ Group site
- Press portrait of Sorokin via Yandex
- "2009 год может показаться цветочками". Президент группы ГАЗ Вадим Сорокин о кризисе в автопроме (in Russian)
