= Karl Clodt von Jürgensburg =

Russian general (1765–1822)

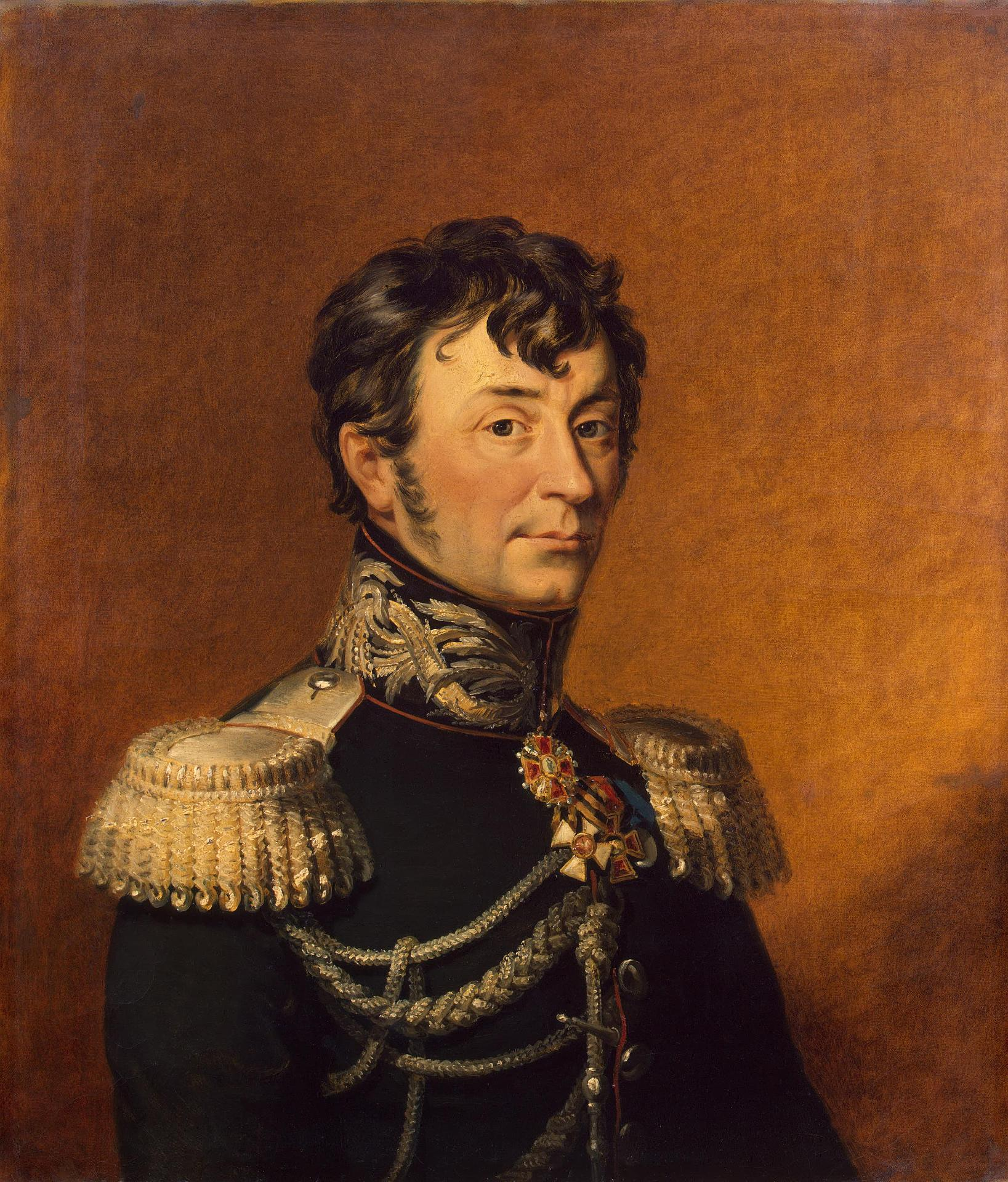
Posthumous portrait by George Dawe and studio after unknown master, 1823–1825; Military Gallery of the Winter Palace, St. Petersburg

Karl Gustav Freiherr Clodt von Jürgensburg (Russian: Карл Фёдорович Клодт фон Юргенсбург, romanized: Karl Fyodorovich fon Yugensburg; 1765–1822) was a general in the Imperial Russian Army during the Napoleonic Wars. He was of Baltic German descent.

== Sources ==
- https://www.adelsvapen.com/genealogi/Clodt_nr_126
