= Sarason =

Sarason is a surname of Jewish origin. Notable people with the surname include:

- Donald Sarason (1933–2017), American mathematician
- Leonard Sarason (1925–1994), American composer
- Seymour Sarason (1919–2010), American psychologist

== See also ==
- Sarason interpolation theorem, is a generalization of the Caratheodory interpolation theorem and Nevanlinna–Pick
- Sarasohn
