= Pavel Sorokin (conductor) =

Russian conductor

- Born: August 14, 1963 (age 62); Moscow, USSR
- Origin: Moscow, Russian Federation
- Labels: Bel Air Classiques, Classical Records, Master Performers, Wienerworld

Pavel Sorokin (Russian: Павел Сорокин; born 14 August 1963) is a Russian conductor born into a strong family tradition of singers and dancers. His mother was a singer, Tamara Sorokina and his father, Shamil Yagudin, a dancer. In 1985 he entered the Moscow Conservatory studying piano under Lev Naumov and conducting in the class of Yury Simonov where he graduated with distinction in both. In 1998 he received the honorary title of Meritorious Artist from the Russian Federation for exceptional achievements in the arts.

== Career ==
=== Early career ===
Sorokin joined Bolshoi Theatre in 1983 and worked there as a ballet accompanist till 1987. Since that year and till 1989 he worked as probationer at the Conservatoire de Paris where he was under guidance from Professor Jean-Sebastien Berreau. During the summer of the same year he joined Boston Symphony Orchestra's Tanglewood Festival at which he too kept his probationer job while being under guidance from Seiji Ozawa and Leonard Bernstein. When his term expired he got a certificate and was opted to perform in USA.

=== Bolshoi Theatre ===
After Sorokin obtained his certificate he returned to Bolshoi Theatre. There, in 1991 he conducted his debut Petrushka which was followed by Prodigal Son and Le Corsaire in 1992 and 1994 respectively. During the same year he also was a conductor of La Sylphide and then worked as an assistant conductor for Mstislav Rostropovich who conducted Khovanshchina in 1996. Starting from beginning of the 21st century he conducted the first Yury Grigorovich's version of Swan Lake which was followed by Arik Melikov's A Legend of Love in 2002 and 2003's Raymonda and The Bright Stream.

=== Other performances ===
Sorokin worked as chief conductor between 2000 and 2002 at Radio and Television State Symphony Orchestra and then held the same position at the Symphony Orchestra of Russia from 2003 to 2007. Since 2007 he works as guest conductor at the Royal Opera House of Covent Garden, Moscow Philharmonic Orchestra, and Łódź Philharmonic. He also works with various soloists such as Elena Obraztsova, Mstislav Rostropovich, Yevgeny Nesterenko and many others.

== Awards ==
- Merited Artist of Russia (1997)
- Award of the Novosibirsk branch of the Union of Theatrical Figures of the Russian Federation "Paradise" (2022)
- Award of the Government of Saint Petersburg in the field of culture and art in the nomination "Theatrical art" for staging of the ballet "Svetly Ruchey" (Russian: «Светлый ручей») at the Mikhailovsky Theater in 2023 (2024)

== Repertoire ==
=== Opera ===
- Khovanshchina
- Eugene Onegin
- Iolanta
- The Tsar’s Bride
- The Golden Cockerel
- Lady Macbeth of Mtsensk
- Carmen
- The Barber of Seville
- Prince Igor
- The Nutcracker

=== Ballet ===
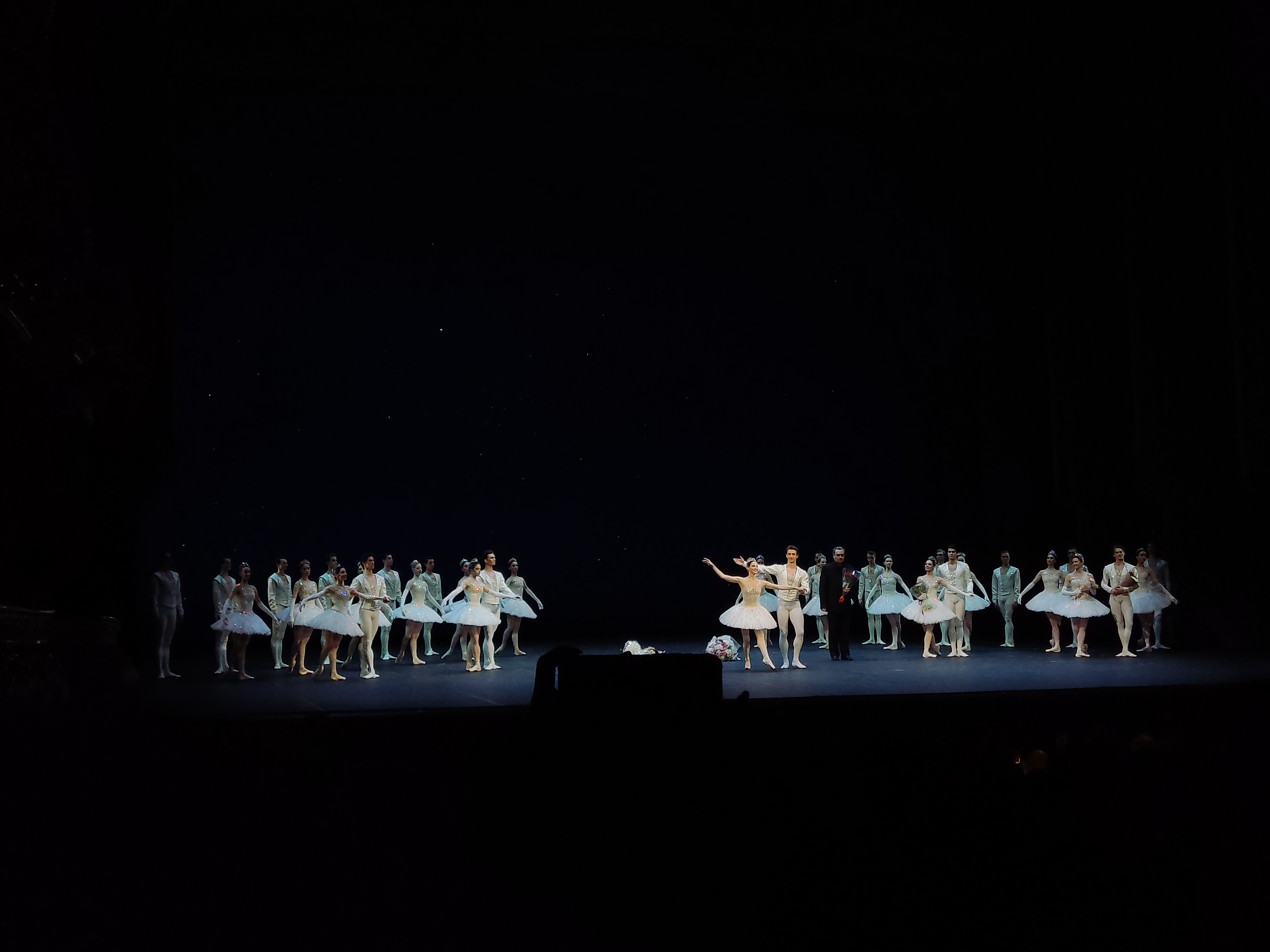
Pavel Sorokin conductes Jewels at Bolshoi (2024)

- Giselle
- Swan Lake
- Raymonda
- The Bright Stream
- Bolt
- A Legend of Love
- Les Sylphides
- Carmen Suite
