= Anna Sorokina (biathlon) =

Russian biathlete (born 1981)

Anna Vitalyevna Sorokina (Russian: А́нна Вита́льевна Соро́кина; born December 1, 1981, Vyazniki, Vladimir Oblast, RSFSR, Soviet Union) is a Russian biathlete, 2007 World champion in summer biathlon. Silver medalist of the (2009 Winter Universiade (mass start at 12.5 km). Master of Sports of Russia.

Anna Sorokina has been practicing biathlon since 1996. She lives near Tyumen. The sports soldier is trained by Sergei Schestov, Olga Melnik, and Leonid Guriev.

Anna graduated from the University of Tyumen in 2004.

She completed her sports career in 2012.
