= Sarasohn =

Sarasohn is a surname of Jewish origin. Notable people with the surname include:

- David Sarasohn
- Homer Sarasohn (1916–2001), American engineer
- Kasriel Hirsch Sarasohn (1835–1905), American journalist

== See also ==
- Sarason
