= Vsevolod Sorokin =

Russian ice hockey player

- Born: October 29, 1993 (age 32) Moscow, Russia
- Height: 6 ft 0 in (183 cm)
- Weight: 183 lb (83 kg; 13 st 1 lb)
- Position: Defence
- Shoots: Left
- Slovak team Former teams: MHk 32 Liptovský Mikuláš; Spartak Moscow; Atlant Moscow Oblast
- NHL draft: Undrafted
- Playing career: 2013–present

Vsevolod Sorokin (Сорокин, Всеволод Кириллович; born October 29, 1993) is a Russian professional ice hockey defenceman who is currently playing for MHk 32 Liptovský Mikuláš of the Slovak Extraliga.

Sorokin made his debut playing with Spartak Moscow during the 2013 Nadezhda Cup.
