= Evgraf Semenovich Sorokin =

Russian painter (1821–1892)

- Евграф Семёнович Сорокин
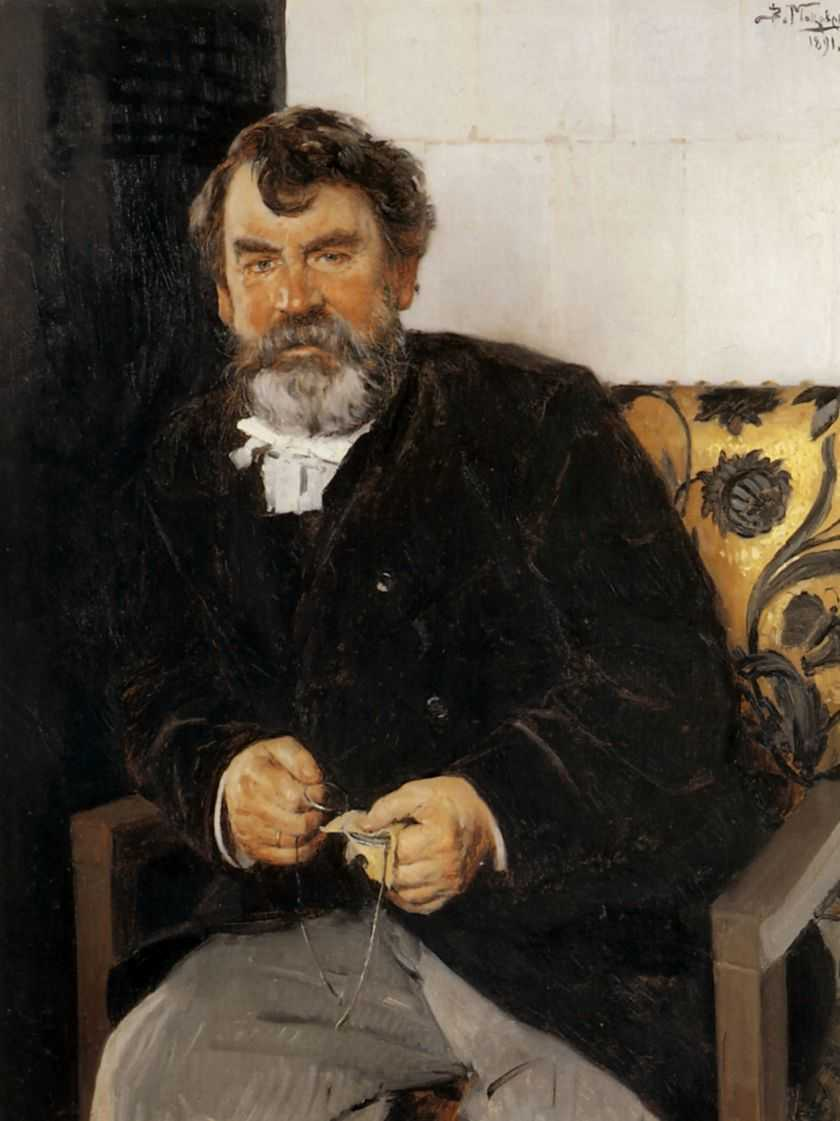
- Portrait by Vladimir Makovsky, 1891
- Born: 6 December 1821; Nekrasovskoye, Russia
- Died: 17 February 1892 (aged 70); Moscow, Russia
- Education: Member Academy of Arts (1861); Professor by rank (1878)
- Alma mater: Imperial Academy of Arts (1849)
- Known for: Painting
- Awards: Big Gold Medal of the Imperial Academy of Arts (1849)

Evgraf Semenovich Sorokin, or Yevgraf Semyonovich Sorokin (Russian: Евгра́ф Семёнович Соро́кин; 18 December 1821 – 17 February 1892) was a Russian artist and teacher; known for historical, religious and genre paintings.

== Biography ==
His first exposure to art came from an icon painter in Yaroslavl. After a period of apprenticeship, a local priest who liked his work suggested that he create a painting of Peter the Great discovering the artist, Andrey Matveyev, for an upcoming visit by Tsar Nicholas I. This painting was presented to the Tsar, who was sufficiently impressed to issue an order that Sorokin should study at the Imperial Academy of Fine Arts.

In 1841, he entered the Academy under the supervision of Alexey Tarasovich Markov. The following year, he was already receiving praise from the Academy Council. He won several silver medals and, in 1847, was awarded a gold medal for his rendering of Daniel in the lions' den. Two years later, his painting of the folk hero, Ian Usmovets, won him a gold medal and a stipend to study abroad. He was in Spain from 1851 to 1854 and Italy from 1855 to 1859. In between, he toured Western Europe; visiting Egypt and Syria as well. Some of the works he created in Spain are among his best-known.

In 1859, he returned home and was appointed a teacher at the Moscow School of Painting, Sculpture and Architecture, where he remained until his death. In 1861, he was named an "Academician" and created an iconostasis for the new Alexander Nevsky Cathedral in Paris. Later, he worked at the Cathedral of Christ the Saviour, where he also created an iconostasis and completed some images that had been left unfinished by Fyodor Bruni. For that work, he was promoted to "Professor" in 1878. His exact date of death is apparently unrecorded.

== Selected paintings ==
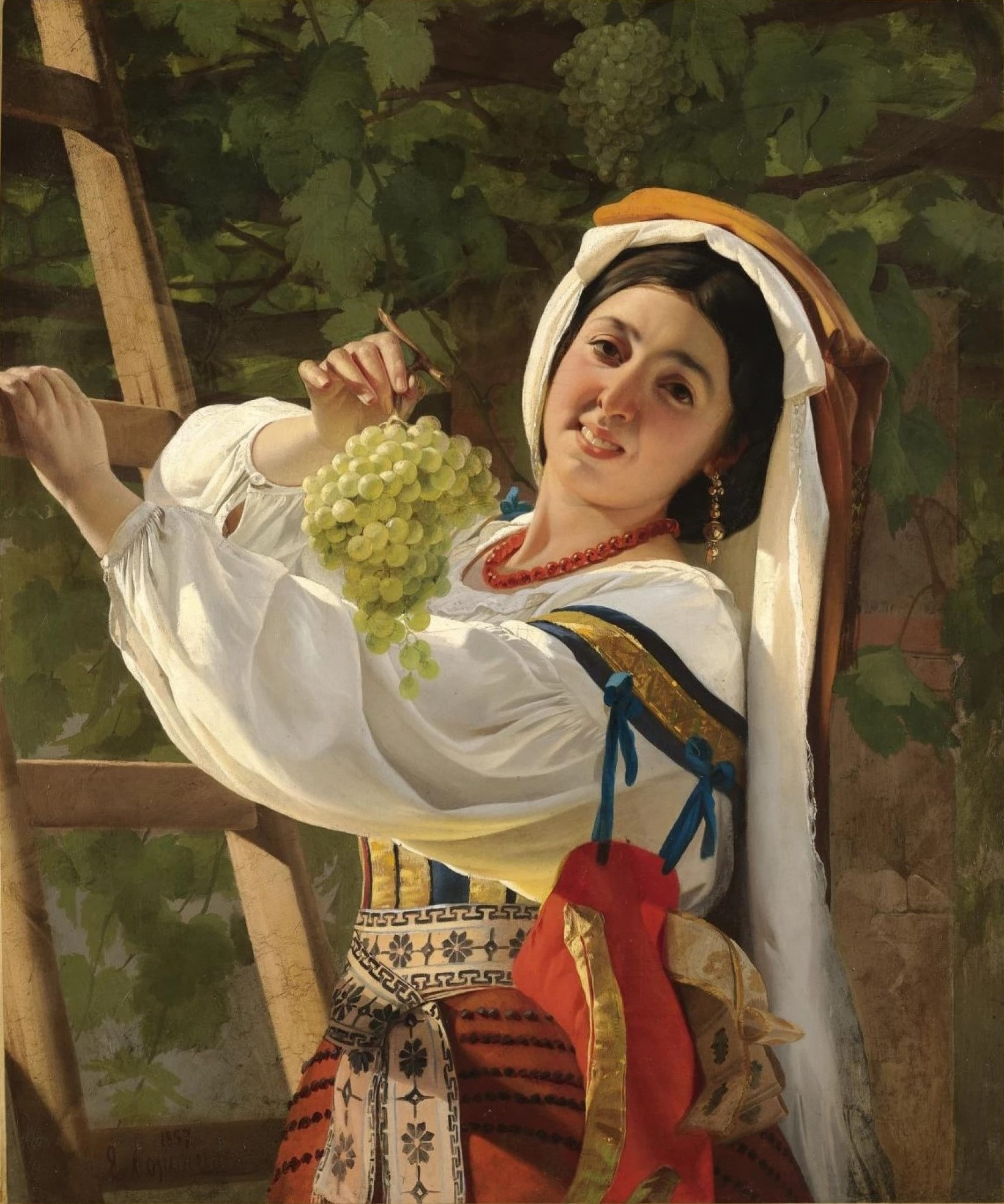
Laughing Italian girl (1857)

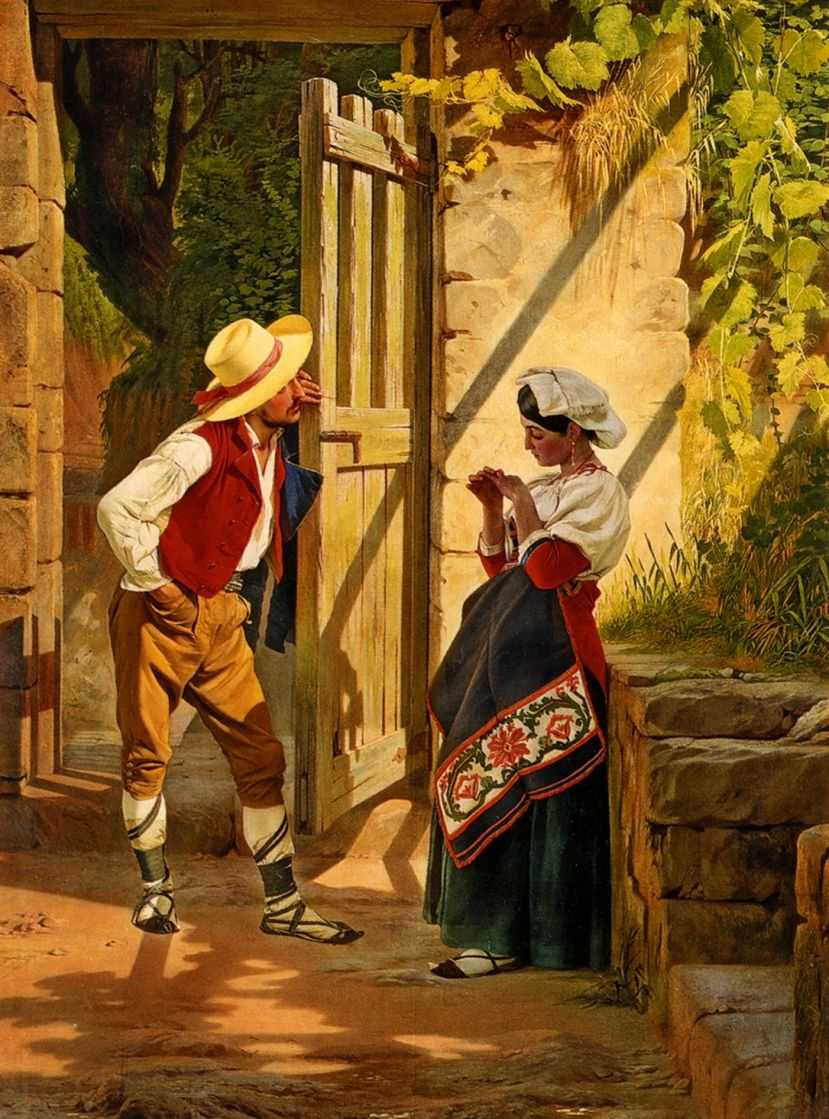
Rendezvous (1858)

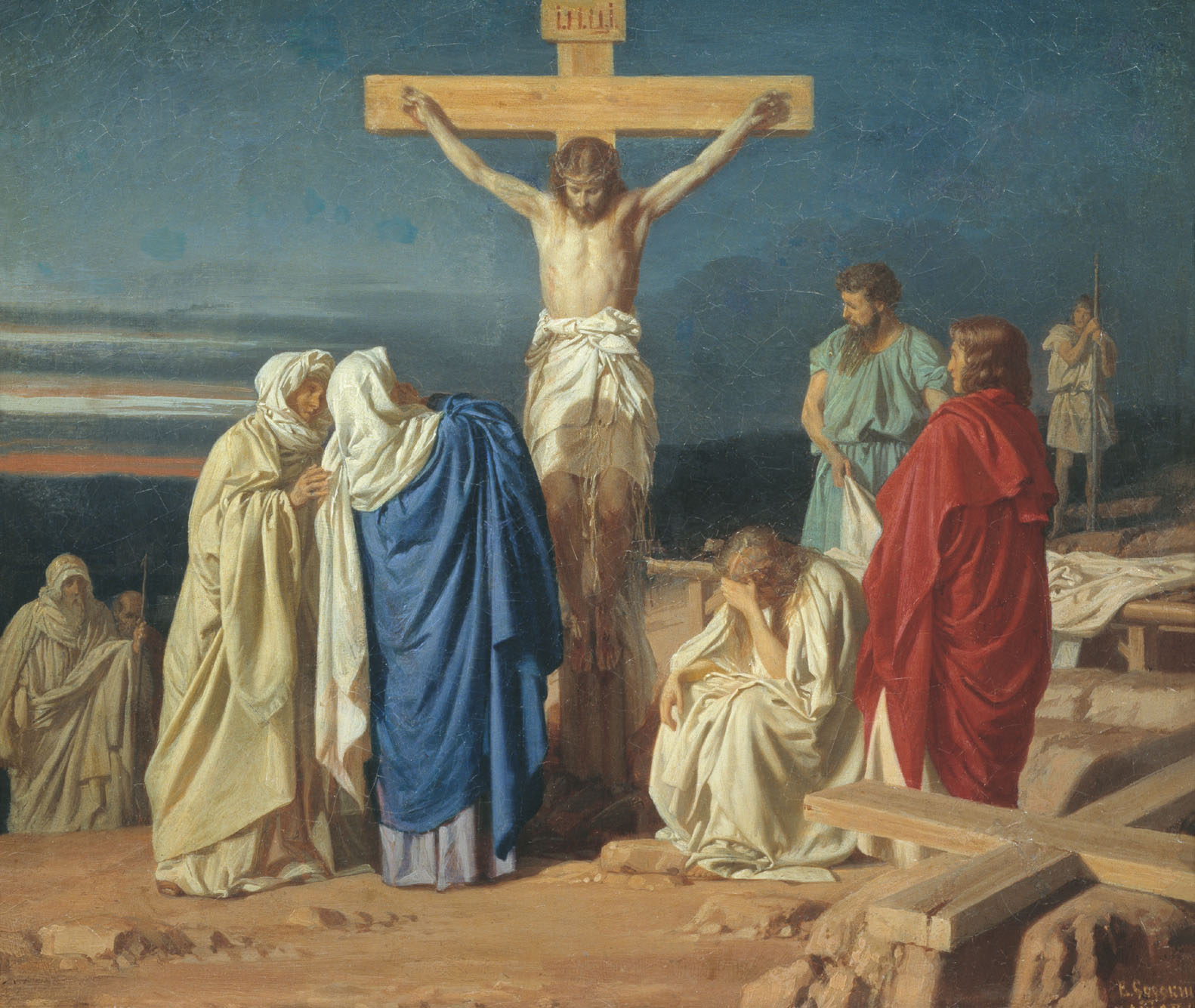
The Crucifixion (1873)

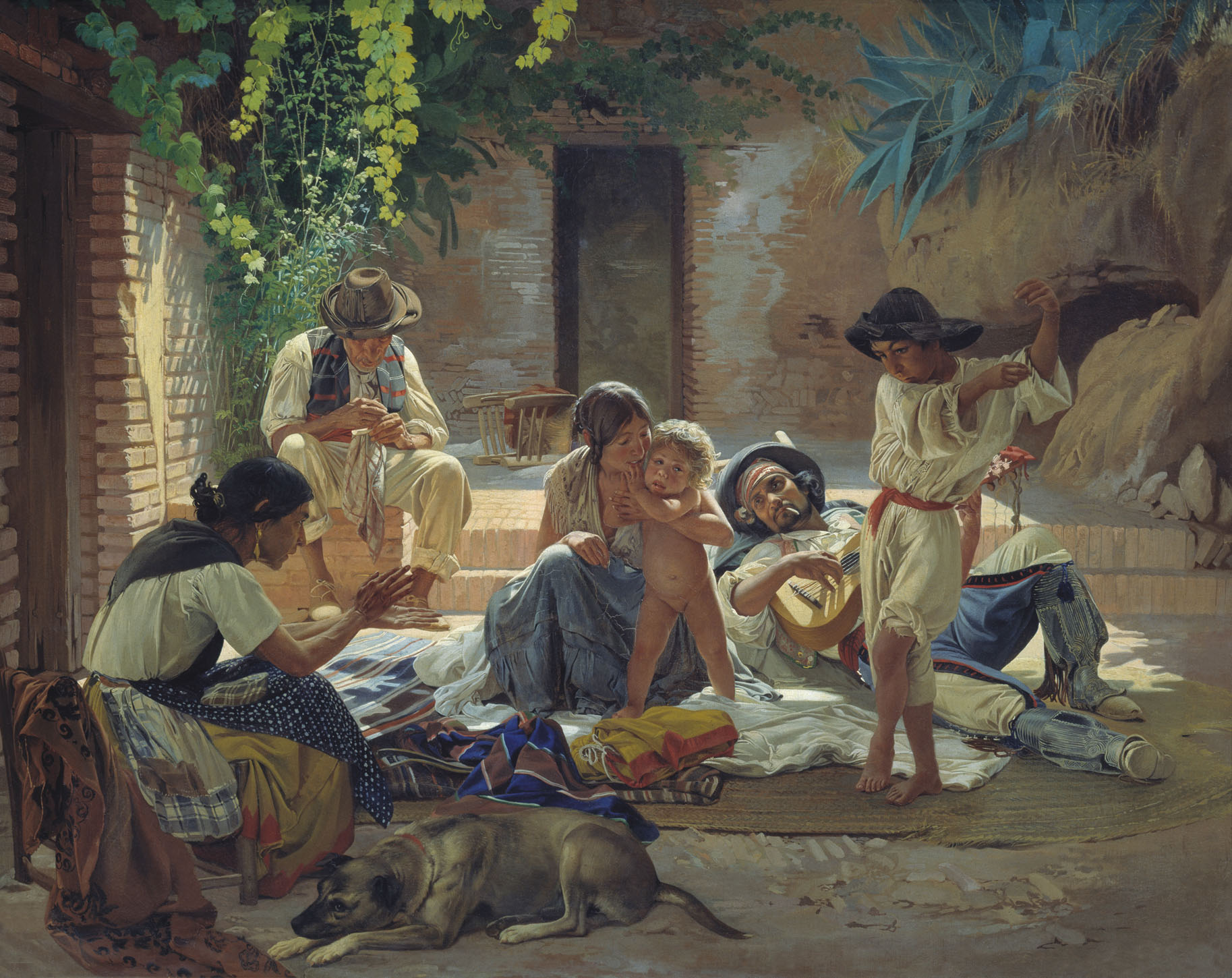
Spanish Gypsies (1853)

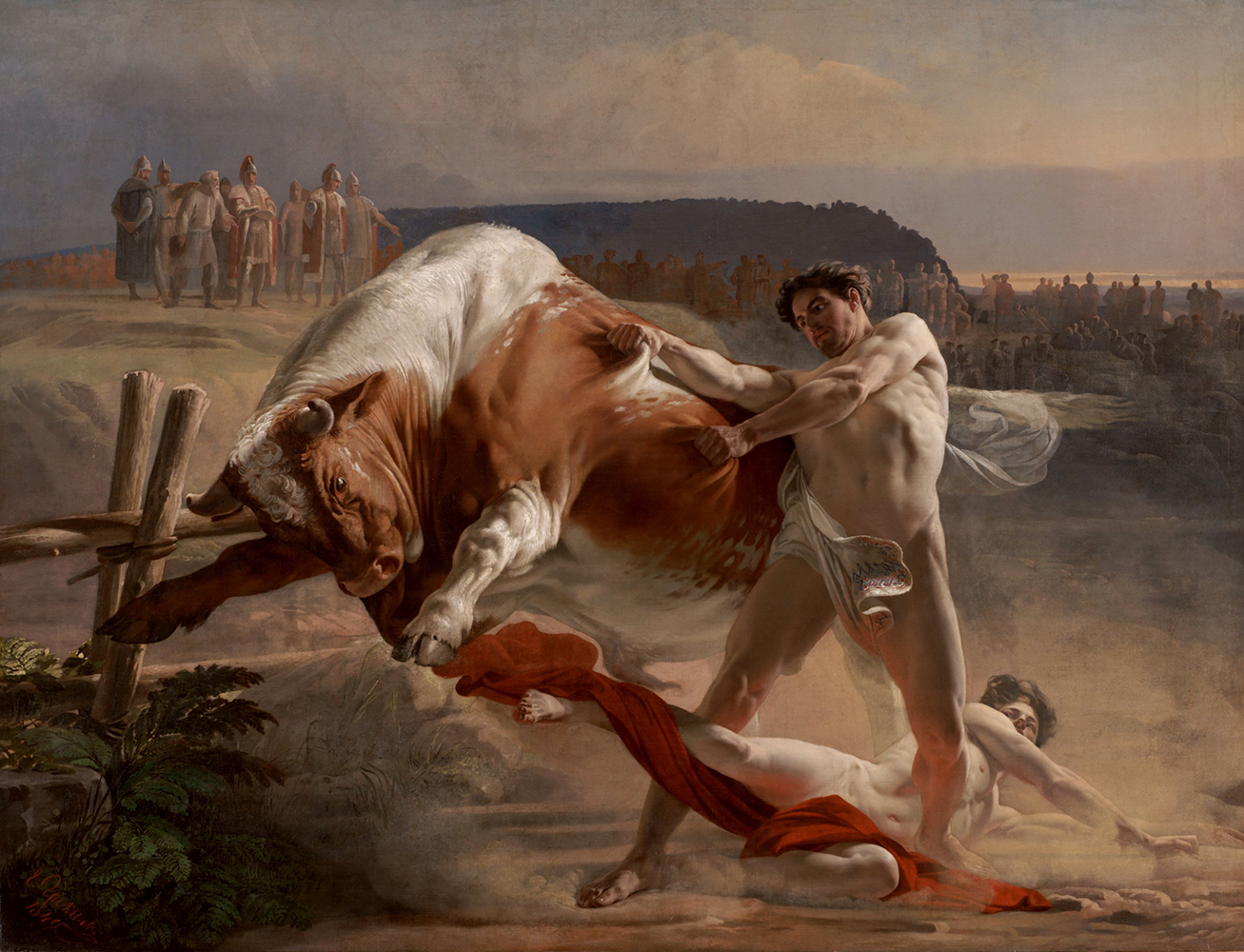
Folk-hero Ian Usmovets Stopping an Angry Bull (1849)

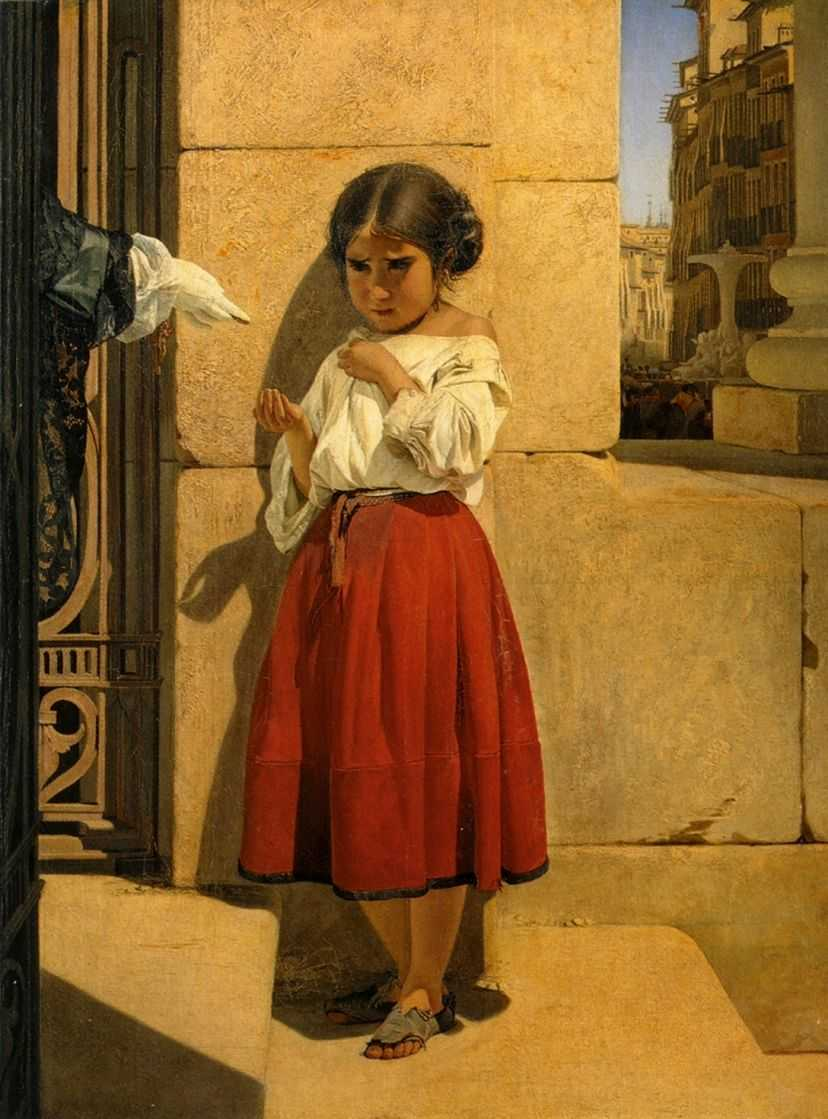
Spanish Beggar Girl (1852)

== Literary sources ==
- С. Н. Кондаков (1915). Юбилейный справочник Императорской Академии художеств. 1764-1914 (in Russian). Vol. 2. p. 187.
