= List of Finnish films of the 1950s =

A list of films produced in Finland ordered by year of release. For an alphabetical list of Finnish films see Category:Finnish films

Title	Director	Cast	Genre	Notes
1950
1951
A Night in Rio	Ville Salminen	Assi Nortia, Leif Wager, Tapio Rautavaara	Comedy	
Four Times Love	Hampe Faustman, Johan Jacobsen	Sonja Wigert	Comedy	
Gabriel, Come Back	Valentin Vaala	Tarmo Manni, Emma Väänänen, Salli Karuna	Comedy	
The General's Fiancée	Ville Salminen	Sakari Halonen, Leena Häkinen	Comedy	
Sadan miekan mies	Ilmari Unho	Kalervo Nissilä, Marja Korhonen	Historical adventure	IMDb
The Radio Burglary	Matti Kassila	Hannes Häyrinen, Ritva Arvelo, Kullervo Kalske	Comedy	
Rovaniemen markkinoilla	Jorma Nortimo	Esa Pakarinen, Reino Helismaa, Jorma Ikävalko	Musical comedy	IMDb
1952
The Radio Goes Insane	Matti Kassila	Hannes Häyrinen, Ritva Arvelo, Uljas Kandolin	Comedy	
The White Reindeer	Erik Blomberg		Horror	Entered into the 1953 Cannes Film Festival
The Witch	Roland af Hällström	Mirja Mane, Toivo Mäkelä	Horror	
1953
Adventure in Morocco	Eddie Stenberg	Assi Nortia, Esa Pakarinen	Comedy	IMDb
April's Coming	Valentin Vaala	Ossi Elstelä, Tuija Halonen and Kurt Ingvall	Comedy	
After the Fall of Man	Edvin Laine	Martti Katajisto, Eila Peitsalo, Edvin Laine	Drama	
Esa "Flies" to Kuopio	Ville Salminen	Esa Pakarinen, Mai-Brit Heljo, Siiri Angerkoski	Comedy	IMDb
The Face in the Mirror	Ralf Rubin	Airi Honkaniemi, Tauno Majuri and Ritva Karisto	Drama	
The Girl from Moon Bridge	Matti Kassila	Tyyne Haarla, Ansa Ikonen, Paavo Jännes	Drama	
The Milkmaid	Toivo Särkkä	Anneli Sauli, Saulo Haarla, Tauno Palo	Drama	IMDb
Jealousy	Teuvo Tulio	Regina Linnanheimo, Eero Paganus, Assi Raine	Drama	
Island Girl	Roland af Hällström	Mirja Mane, Leif Wager, Henake Schubak	Drama	
It Began in the Rain	Thure Bahne, Eddie Stenberg	Eila Peitsalo, Tauno Palo and Kaarlo Halttunen	Comedy	
The Millionaire Recruit	Roland af Hällström	Lasse Pöysti, Sakari Halonen and Pentti Viljanen	Comedy	
Mother or Woman	Ilmari Unho	Helena Futtari, Aku Korhonen, Elina Pohjanpää	Drama	
Nukkekauppias ja kaunis Lilith	Jack Witikka	Martti Katajisto, Hillevi Lagerstam	Drama, Fantasy	IMDb
Pekka Puupää	Ville Salminen	Esa Pakarinen, Masa Niemi	Comedy	First of a series IMDb
Pekka Puupää kesälaitumilla	Armand Lohikoski	Esa Pakarinen, Masa Niemi, Siiri Angerkoski	Comedy	2nd of series IMDb
Shamrock	Roland af Hällström, Kyllikki Forssell, Esko Töyri	Eeva-Kaarina Volanen, Leif Wager, Tauno Palo	Comedy, drama	
Song of Warsaw	Matti Kassila	Matti Oravisto, Åke Lindman, Christina Paischeff	Drama	
Two Funny Guys	Lasse Pöysti	Lasse Pöysti, Toini Vartiainen, Pentti Viljanen	Comedy	
We're Coming Back	Armand Lohikoski	Tuija Halonen, Tapio Rautavaara, Siiri Angerkoski	Comedy	
1954
Pekka ja Pätkä lumimiehen jäljillä	Armand Lohikoski	Esa Pakarinen, Masa Niemi, Siiri Angerkoski	Comedy	3rd of series IMDb
Hilma's Name Day	Matti Kassila	Matti Ranin, Aino Mantsas, Tauno Palo	Romantic comedy	IMDb
1955
Pekka ja Pätkä puistotäteinä	Armand Lohikoski	Esa Pakarinen, Masa Niemi, Siiri Angerkoski	Comedy	4th of series IMDb
Kiinni on ja pysyy – Pekan ja Pätkän uusia seikkailuja	Armand Lohikoski	Esa Pakarinen, Masa Niemi	Comedy	5th of series - IMDb
Pekka ja Pätkä pahassa pulassa	Armand Lohikoski	Esa Pakarinen, Masa Niemi	Comedy	6th of series - IMDb
The Wild North	Aarne Tarkas	Tapio Rautavaara, Elina Pohjanpää	Western adventure	IMDb
The Unknown Soldier (Tuntematon sotilas)	Edvin Laine	Kosti Klemelä, Heikki Savolainen	War drama	7 wins & 1 nomination
1956
The Harvest Month	Matti Kassila		Drama	Entered into the 1957 Cannes Film Festival
Juha	T.J. Särkkä	Elina Pohjanpää, Eino Kaipainen	Drama	
1957
1918	T.J. Särkkä	Åke Lindman, Anneli Sauli	Drama, War	Entered into the 7th Berlin International Film Festival
Miriam	William Markus		Drama	Entered into the 8th Berlin International Film Festival
Pekka ja Pätkä sammakkomiehinä	Armand Lohikoski	Esa Pakarinen, Masa Niemi, Siiri Angerkoski	Comedy	
1958
Pekka ja Pätkä Suezilla	Armand Lohikoski	Esa Pakarinen, Masa Niemi, Siiri Angerkoski	Comedy	
Sven Tuuva the Hero	Edvin Laine		War	Entered into the 9th Berlin International Film Festival
1959
Sampo	Aleksandr Ptushko; Risto Orko	Urho Somersalmi, Ivan Voronov, Anna Orochko	Fantasy	Finnish-Soviet co-production
Moonwolf	George Freedland	Carl Möhner, Anneli Sauli, Helmut Schmid	Science-fiction	West German-Finnish co-production
Red Line	Matti Kassila		Drama	Entered into the 1st Moscow International Film Festival
