= Pekka and Pätkä =

Finnish comedy film series

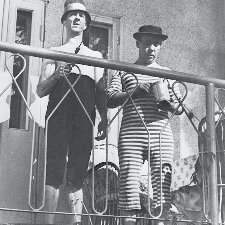
Pekka Puupää and Pätkä

Pekka and Pätkä (Finnish: Pekka ja Pätkä) is the name of several comedy films produced by Suomen Filmiteollisuus (SF) in the 1950s in Finland, based on the popular Finnish comic characters Pekka Puupää (played by Esa Pakarinen) and Pätkä (Masa Niemi), who can be said to be the Finnish version of Laurel and Hardy.

== Production history ==
Suomen Filmiteollisuus (SF) began production of the movies a year after the original cartoonist Ola Fogelberg passed away. While the first movie was directed by Ville Salminen, Armand Lohikoski would go on to direct 11 of the original films. Screenplays were written mostly by Reino Helismaa with Lohikoski also writing several. The final film of the series was directed by Aarne Tarkas, after Lohikoski was fired from SF. The first movie's success was immediately apparent which is why the first sequel, Pekka Puupää kesälaitumilla, was produced the very same year. Multiple Pekka and Pätkä films would be produced in the same year, including three in 1955 and 1957 as well as two in 1958.

Esa Pakarinen and Siiri Angerkoski had appeared alongside each other in Rovaniemen markkinoilla, which led to their casting. Pakarinen was not a trained actor and primarily a musician but his on-screen chemistry with Masa Niemi was apparent. Niemi and Pakarinen appeared alongside several movies in 1953, solidifying their working relationship. Pakarinen's biggest contribution to the character was his Savonian dialect. The SF screenwriters could not copy the dialogue, so wrote his lines straight and had Pakarinen apply his natural dialect on set. Masa Niemi's alcoholism would cause occasional difficulties as he had a tendency to become emotional and unable to work. Angerkoski reportedly disliked Niemi for this reason. Pakarinen was charged with keeping Niemi in line while the two worked together.

The location and appearance of the Puupää-couple's apartment building changed radically during the first seven films in the series, albeit their fictional address, Voikukkakatu 5 (Dandelion Street), remained fairly consistent. A permanent set was built and used from the eighth film, Pekka ja Pätkä salapoliiseina, onward.

The movies followed a typical musical comedy structure, focusing on Pekka and Pätkä's quest for work and/or money, while featuring song numbers and often a secondary male and female protagonist in a romantic subplot. The major exception to this was Kiinni on ja pysyy which was an unrelated comedy script which was modified to feature Pekka and Pätkä as its protagonists, resulting in Justiina being absent from the plot. Several films in the series have the plot divided episodically, focusing on different stories for the first and second halves, such as in Pekka ja Pätkä pahassa pulassa, Pekka ja Pätkä ketjukolarissa, Pekka ja Pätkä sammakkomiehinä, Pekka ja Pätkä neekereinä.

The secondary male protagonists would frequently be famous Finnish singers, such as Olavi Virta who appeared in three consecutive films in the series as different characters. Tapio Rautavaara starred in the first film. A then-unknown Spede Pasanen also had supporting roles in Pekka ja Pätkä sammakkomiehinä and its direct sequel Pekka ja Pätkä Suezilla. The grumpy janitor, Pikkarainen, debuted in the fourth movie, played by Armas Jokio. The character became so popular he would appear in all subsequent movies barring Kiinni on ja pysyy.

Lohikoski was fired from SF, when he presented his original script for the series' 13th and eventual final film. Lohikoski's original concept had Pekka and Pätkä become Members of the Finnish Parliament. Toivo Särkkä, head of SF, was so offended that he fired Lohikoski on the spot. The financial disappointment of the eventual movie, Pekka ja Pätkä neekereinä, caused Särkkä to cancel any future films. Devastated, Masa Niemi committed suicide the same year.

== Characters ==
The characters are loosely based on the original comics. Pekka, Pätkä and Justiina were heavily modified by their actors. While Pätkä was only an incidental actor, he became Pekka's best friend for the films. Justiina's mean-spirited nature was added to by Siiri Angerkoski's talent for speaking incredibly fast. The character Pikkarainen, the janitor for the Puupää couple's building, was not from the comics but became a staple of the series following his debut in the fourth film.

Pekka Puupää is a tall and lanky man who lives in Helsinki with his strict and controlling wife Justiina (played by Siiri Angerkoski). He is a very kind man but probably not the sharpest knife in the drawer. In addition to his height, his most recognizable feature is the daisy attached to his hat. His last name translates to the Finnish equivalent of the expression "blockhead". In the films he speaks with a distinct Savonian dialect.

Pekka's best friend Pätkä is a short and stocky man, whose past is not known. He knows many sayings and usually utters them whenever he has the chance to do so. He is the more intelligent member of the pair.

== Reception ==
Though the films are very much beloved by Finnish audiences (and receive regular airings on the YLE) the overall quality of the series has often been put to question. In interviews, Armand Lohikoski also noted that filming the comedies was far from easy and he feels that the overall quality of the films did suffer because they were made with a low budget and often with volume only in mind. Understandably, the films have never been popular with critics. Several incidents, particularly the less-than-believable Yeti costume from the 1954 film were some of the things that Lohikoski was never proud of. Also, the alcoholic tendencies of Masa Niemi caused problems when he refused to come to shootings. The film series eventually ended after Niemi committed suicide.

=== Controversy ===
Potentially stereotypical depictions of Blacks and Arabs have caught the eyes of contemporary critics, though it could be argued that the Arabs from the 1958 film were depicted as required. However, the final 1960 film Pekka and Pätkä as Negroes has received much criticism due to its title. Many however feel that the criticism is harsh, due to the term being quite neutral in Finnish language at the time, and the theme of the main-characters posing as blacks only takes up a small portion of the actual film. It is perhaps notable that Pikkarainen calls the pair "cannibals", but again this is a very brief and unimportant part of the film which (as usual) turns against Pikkarainen at the end.

Another more plainly offensive scene was from a dream-sequence in one of the films in which Pekka and Pätkä are bathing in a pot, surrounded by African natives, oblivious to the fact that they are being cooked alive.

== Legacy ==
The films have subsequently been shown on TV many times and are part of YLE's regular broadcast cycle. The films would also be released in various collections on DVD.

Esa Pakarinen would continue to play Pekka Puupää on stage after the end of the film series in 1960. He hired Pekka Lappalainen to play Pätkä with him during these performances.

The series experienced a short-lived revival in the mid-1980s. Director Visa Mäkinen produced Pekka & Pätkä ja tuplajättipotti in 1985, starring Mauri Kuosmanen as Pekka, Jaakko Kallio as Pätkä, Kristiina Elstelä as Justiina and Ilmari Saarelainen as Janitor Pikkarainen. The unexpected success of the film led to a short TV show in 1986. Only three episodes were produced, however, with the film also edited into a three-part storyline. Kuosmanen did not reprise his role after the first film and was instead replaced by Esko Roine.

Mäkinen would direct a second movie, Pekka Puupää poliisina, the following year to a much more muted reception.

== List of movies ==
Original films:

- Pekka Puupää (1953)
- Pekka Puupää kesälaitumilla (Pekka and Pätkä on a summer holiday) (1953)
- Pekka ja Pätkä lumimiehen jäljillä (Tracing the abominable snowman) (1954)
- Pekka ja Pätkä puistotäteinä (As playground supervisors) (1955)
- Kiinni on ja pysyy (Fixed good and firm) (1955)
- Pekka ja Pätkä pahassa pulassa (In big trouble) (1955)
- Pekka ja Pätkä ketjukolarissa (In a pile-up) (1957)
- Pekka ja Pätkä salapoliiseina (As private eyes) (1957)
- Pekka ja Pätkä sammakkomiehinä (As frogmen) (1957)
- Pekka ja Pätkä Suezilla (On Suez) (1958)
- Pekka ja Pätkä miljonääreinä (As millionaires) (1958)
- Pekka ja Pätkä mestarimaalareina (As master painters) (1959)
- Pekka ja Pätkä neekereinä (As negroes) (1960)

Tributes:

- Pekka & Pätkä ja tuplajättipotti (Double jackpot) (1985)
- Pekka Puupää poliisina (As policemen) (1986)
- Pekka ja Pätkä levottomina (Being restless) (planned in 2005, not made to date)

The 1958 film On Suez is a strict sequel to As Frogmen, continuing where the last movie left off. This is the only sign of consistent continuity in the series, apart from random mentions of events in previous films.
