= Pekka ja Pätkä sammakkomiehinä =

- Original Finnish film poster.
- Directed by: Armand Lohikoski
- Written by: Armand Lohikoski
- Produced by: T. J. Särkkä
- Starring: Esa Pakarinen; Masa Niemi; Siiri Angerkoski; Sirkka-Liisa Wilén
- Cinematography: Olavi Tuomi; Mikko Sergejeff
- Edited by: Elmer Lahti
- Music by: Toivo Kärki
- Production company: Suomen Filmiteollisuus SF Oy
- Release date: 20 December 1957
- Running time: 91 minutes
- Country: Finland
- Language: Finnish

Pekka and Pätkä as Frogmen (Finnish: Pekka ja Pätkä sammakkomiehinä) is a 1957 Finnish film directed and written by Armand Lohikoski. It is the ninth film in the 13-part Pekka Puupää series produced by Suomen Filmiteollisuus. The story continues in the following film Pekka ja Pätkä Suezilla. In one of the scenes, Pekka and Pätkä perform as magicians, using the magic word "ananasakäämä", which later became famous through Timo Taikuri.

Lohikoski directed all but the first and last of the Puupää films produced by Suomen Filmiteollisuus. He also wrote the scripts for many of them and appeared in small roles in four.

Frogmen is considered by many critics to be the best in the series. In the film, Pekka and Pätkä, as traveling musicians, are called up for military refresher training and end up representing the Finnish Navy in a boxing match against the Finnish Army. A critic praised the film for its smooth progression and noted its multi-level humor, folk anecdotes, and emerging rock culture. Another critic admitted that although the film "lacks any hint of intellect," it has a unique charm. Wilén's mermaid character was noted for her boldness.

== Plot ==
Pekka and Pätkä form a two-man orchestra. Before setting out on tour, they learn the song "Hippaa ja Hoppaa" from a music store's display and practice it on the street. On tour in Turku and Tampere, their performances draw sparse and dissatisfied audiences. In Pori, with only one sleeping spectator, they return to Helsinki defeated. At home, they receive a summons for military refresher training and join a frogman course. While practicing swimming techniques in the outer archipelago, they discover a mermaid and take her along. They leave Helmi the mermaid waiting in a bathtub, where Justiina finds her, mistaking her for a large pike. Alarmed, she calls for the janitor Pikkarainen. Both are astounded by the mermaid. Helmi ends up as a "water maiden" at Linnanmäki amusement park. The film also features a boxing match between the navy and the army.

Eventually, the duo is discharged with thanks. While reading a newspaper on a park bench, two departing UN peacekeepers knock them unconscious and switch uniforms. Pekka and Pätkä are then sent to Helsinki-Vantaa Airport, where a plane takes them to a Finnish UN peacekeeping camp in Suez.

== Cast ==
- Esa Pakarinen as Pekka Puupää
- Masa Niemi as Pätkä
- Siiri Angerkoski as Justiina Puupää
- Armas Jokio as Janitor Pikkarainen
- Sirkka-Liisa Wilén as Helmi, the mermaid
- Pentti Viljanen as Sergeant Saastamoinen
- Pentti Irjala as Warrant Officer
- Jussi Kumpulainen as Driver
- Irja Kuusla as Mattsonska
