= Esa "Flies" to Kuopio =

1953 film by Ville Salminen

- Original Finnish film poster
- Finnish: Lentävä kalakukko
- Directed by: Ville Salminen
- Written by: Reino Helismaa
- Produced by: T.J. Särkkä
- Starring: Esa Pakarinen; Mai-Brit Heljo; Siiri Angerkoski
- Cinematography: Kauno Laine
- Edited by: Armas Vallasvuo
- Music by: Toivo Kärki
- Production company: Suomen Filmiteollisuus
- Distributed by: Suomen Filmiteollisuus
- Release date: 13 March 1953
- Running time: 66 minutes
- Country: Finland
- Language: Finnish

Esa "Flies" to Kuopio (Finnish: Lentävä kalakukko, Swedish: Esa "flyger" till Kuopio) is a 1953 Finnish comedy crime film directed by Ville Salminen and starring Esa Pakarinen, Mai-Brit Heljo and Siiri Angerkoski.

The film takes place in February 1946. Viski-Ville, Läski-Leevi and Kello-Kalle, the members of Kulaus-Ramperi's bandit, make an unfortunate burglary and flee from Helsinki to Kuopio on a train express called the Flying Kalakukko (Finnish: Lentävä Kalakukko). The police get a clue about the bandits' escape route. The fast-paced conductor Samuli Saastamoinen (Esa Pakarinen) is also a train detective who trying to capture them. Masa Niemi plays a small crook, Läski-Leevi, who has an annoying myokymia.

== Cast ==
- Esa Pakarinen as Samuli Saastamoinen, Train detective
- Mai-Brit Heljo as Pretty-Molly
- Siiri Angerkoski as Jenni
- Kullervo Kalske as Yrjö
- Armas Jokio as Aleksi
- Leo Lähteenmäki as Kulaus-Ramperi / Detective Saastamoinen
- Matti Aulos
- Irja Rannikko as Taimi Töikkä
- Hannes Veivo as Kello-Kalle
- Masa Niemi as Leevi Lindroos / Läski-Leevi
- Pentti Irjala as Lumberjack in Train
- Eino Kaipainen as Chief Constable Räikkönen
- Kauko Kokkonen as Police
- Nestori Lampi as Hungry Passenger
- Heimo Lepistö as Lumberjack in Train
- Veikko Linna as Conductor Laitinen
- Esko Mannermaa as Station-master
- Lasse Pihlajamaa as Accordionist
- Holger Salin as Train Constable
- Ville Salminen as Vilho Adolf Napoleon Rötkö / Viski-Ville

== See also ==
- Pekka Puupää (film)

== Bibliography ==
- Qvist, Per Olov & von Bagh, Peter. Guide to the Cinema of Sweden and Finland. Greenwood Publishing Group, 2000.
