= Pekka ja Pätkä Suezilla =

- Original Finnish film poster.
- Directed by: Armand Lohikoski
- Written by: Armand Lohikoski
- Produced by: T. J. Särkkä
- Starring: Esa Pakarinen; Masa Niemi; Siiri Angerkoski; Assi Nortia
- Cinematography: Olavi Tuomi; Mikko Sergejeff
- Edited by: Elmer Lahti
- Music by: Toivo Kärki; Hannu Halonen
- Production company: Suomen Filmiteollisuus
- Release date: 25 April 1958
- Running time: 74 minutes
- Country: Finland
- Language: Finnish

Pekka and Pätkä at Suez (Finnish: Pekka ja Pätkä Suezilla) (1958) is the tenth film in the Pekka Puupää series, directed and written by Armand Lohikoski. This series, produced by Suomen Filmiteollisuus, includes thirteen films released between 1953 and 1960. Pekka ja Pätkä Suezilla follows the previous film Pekka ja Pätkä sammakkomiehinä.

The scenes set in Suez were filmed in a sandpit in Seutula, with cardboard palm trees, sand mounds for pyramids, and steamships pulled through a puddle. Contemporary critics initially believed the film was shot on location in Suez, and some complained about the monotonous scenery. The steamship scene was reused footage from Rantasalmen sulttaani filmed in Morocco in 1953.

== Plot ==
The film begins with the ending of Pekka ja Pätkä sammakkomiehinä, where United Nations peacekeepers knock out the duo in a park. Mistaken for peacekeepers, they are sent to Suez. After a series of misadventures, they rescue the caliph's daughter and receive a magic lamp, which grants three wishes. Following poorly thought-out wishes, they return home to Voikukankatu.

== Cast ==
- Esa Pakarinen as Pekka Puupää
- Masa Niemi as Pätkä
- Siiri Angerkoski as Justiina Puupää
- Assi Nortia as Suleima
- Kauko Kokkonen as Sergeant Pippurinen
- Veikko Linna as Ben Jussuf
- Pentti Irjala as Genie of the Lamp
- Heikki Savolainen as Sheik Ali Ben Ali
- Tommi Rinne as UN soldier
- Mikko Niskanen as UN soldier
- Spede Pasanen as UN soldier

== Reception ==
Contemporary critics viewed the film with resignation. Jukka Holopainen of Suomen Sosialidemokraatti accepted the concept, acknowledging its popularity among younger audiences. Tomira Savtschenko of Kansan Uutiset found the film's humor and intellectual level unchanged, though a reader later defended the director's efforts, suggesting the critic underestimated the complexity of the production.

== Notes ==
- The movie is a direct sequel to Pekka ja Pätkä Sammakkomiehinä (1957) and the movie begins with the final scene of this film explaining how Pekka and Pätkä end up on the plane to Suez.
- The film's setting was inspired by the real Suez Crisis in 1956.
- Due to the film's exotic location the series' other regular characters, Pekka's wife Justiina (Siiri Angerkoski) and caretaker Pikkarainen (Armas Jokio) only appear briefly towards the end of the film.
- The film features an early appearance by Spede Pasanen
