= Kiinni on ja pysyy =

- Original Finnish film poster.
- Directed by: Armand Lohikoski
- Written by: Reino Helismaa
- Produced by: T. J. Särkkä
- Starring: Esa Pakarinen; Masa Niemi; Liisa Taxell; Tommi Rinne
- Cinematography: Pentti Valkeala
- Edited by: Elmer Lahti
- Music by: Toivo Kärki
- Production company: Suomen Filmiteollisuus
- Release date: 6 May 1955
- Running time: 79 minutes
- Country: Finland
- Language: Finnish

Caught and Held Fast... (Finnish: Kiinni on ja pysyy – Pekan ja Pätkän uusia seikkailuja) is the fifth film in the Pekka Puupää series, directed by Armand Lohikoski and released in 1955, two months after the previous film, Pekka ja Pätkä puistotäteinä.

== Plot ==
In the film, Pekka Puupää and Pätkä work as inventors, and the duo are developing, among other things, instant yeast, a robot, a beard-growing substance, unbreakable glass, and a special glue.

== Cast ==
- Esa Pakarinen - Pekka Puupää
- Masa Niemi - Pätkä
- Liisa Taxell - Secretary Soma Koivu
- Tommi Rinne - Constable Antero Kangas
- Åke Lindman - Arpi ("Scar")
- Einari Ketola - Joonas
- Arvo Kuusla - Leksa

== Production ==
After four Pekka and Pätkä films, screenwriter Reino Helismaa was ready to leave his characters behind and planned to name the characters Julius and Jallu (played by Pakarinen and Niemi) in his next film, but producer T. J. Särkkä did not want to give up his popular duo and so the film became the fifth Pekka and Pätkä film. Because Justiina Puupää (played by Siiri Angerkoski in the previous films) was not considered necessary to include in the story, she was omitted except for the image depicting her in the film.

== Reception ==
The film was poorly received by contemporary critics. Leo Nordberg from Uusi Suomi considered the film to be "garbage that takes money from children who lack critical thinking", although he praises the villain played by Åke Lindman.

In a 1996 television rerun, Mikael Fränti of Helsingin Sanomat described the film as a "tiresome, forced-joke comedy".
