= Pekka Puupää kesälaitumilla =

- Original Finnish film poster.
- Directed by: Armand Lohikoski
- Written by: Reino Helismaa
- Produced by: T. J. Särkkä
- Starring: Esa Pakarinen; Masa Niemi; Siiri Angerkoski; Olavi Virta
- Cinematography: Kauno Laine
- Edited by: Armas Vallasvuo
- Music by: Toivo Kärki
- Production company: Suomen Filmiteollisuus
- Release date: 16 October 1953
- Running time: 90 minutes
- Country: Finland
- Language: Finnish

Pekka Puupää on Summer Pastures (Finnish: Pekka Puupää kesälaitumilla) is the second film in the Pekka Puupää series. Directed by Armand Lohikoski and written by Reino Helismaa, it premiered in 1953.

The film has also been adapted into several stage plays.

== Plot ==
Justiina sends Pekka and Pätkä to rent a summer villa. A deceitful real estate agent, Adolf Muikku, tricks them by showing a photograph with a luxurious mansion next to a shabby cottage. Believing they have acquired the mansion, Pekka and Pätkä plan to open a boarding house named Puunpätkä. They are joined by Kalevi Vaski, a relative of Pätkä, whom they meet on the street.

The duo moves into the villa (entering through the chimney as the key doesn't fit the door), opens their boarding house, and welcomes distinguished guests from Helsinki. Meanwhile, Pätkä and Kalevi encounter a girl, Eeva, whose car has broken down. Kalevi and Eeva bond as Pätkä attempts to fix the car, only to discover it's out of gas. At the villa, Eeva, revealed to be the owner's daughter, finds the duo reveling with the guests, fueled by brandy discovered in the cellar. The real owner, Director Riuku, and his wife arrive, evicting Pekka and Pätkä, who then realize they have only bought the neighboring cottage.

Kalevi and Eeva fall in love. Eeva, seeing Kalevi's potential as a singer, records him secretly and arranges for his audition with music industry professionals. His recording impresses them, leading to Kalevi's immediate hiring, and Director Riuku purchases the cottage from Pekka and Pätkä, ending their troubles.

== Cast ==
- Esa Pakarinen as Pekka Puupää
- Masa Niemi as Pätkä
- Siiri Angerkoski as Justiina Puupää
- Olavi Virta as Kalevi Vaski
- Ruth Johansson as Eeva Riuku
- Veikko Linna as Director Armas Kotivalo Riuku
- Martti Seilo as Dr. Linssi
- Helmi Lehosti as Mrs. Riuku
- Laila Rihte as Mrs. Pykälä
- Elli Ylimaa as Mrs. Linssi
- Sasu Haapanen as Real Estate Agent Adolf Muikku
- Erkki Uotila as Judge Pykälä

== Production ==
Following the success of the first Pekka Puupää film, the second installment was quickly prepared. Ville Salminen, the director of the first film, declined to continue, not wanting to be typecast as a Puupää director. Armand Lohikoski was appointed as the new director, becoming a mainstay for the series.

Scripted by Reino Helismaa, the film included a romantic subplot aimed at adult audiences, featuring Olavi Virta and Ruth Johansson. Virta, replacing Tapio Rautavaara from the first film, sang several memorable songs, including "Sinun silmiesi tähden" (lyrics by Helismaa and music by Toivo Kärki).

The production toned down some of the excessive drinking scenes for a more family-friendly audience. Armas Jokio, who later played Janitor Pikkarainen in the series, also appeared in a supporting role.

== Reception ==
In a 2012 review, Siiri Angerkoski's performance was highlighted as reaching impressive heights. Another critic praised Olavi Virta's rendition of "Sinun silmiesi tähden" as a standout moment.
