= Masa Niemi =

Finnish actor (1914–1960)

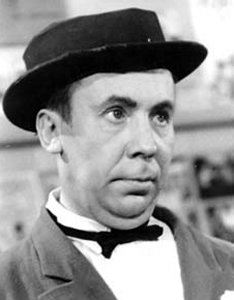
- Born: Martti Elis Niemi; 20 July 1914; Viipuri, Province of Viipuri, Grand Duchy of Finland, Russian Empire (now Vyborg, Leningrad Oblast, Russian Federation)
- Died: 3 May 1960 (aged 45); Tampere, Finland

Martti "Masa" Elis Niemi (20 July 1914 – 3 May 1960) was a Finnish actor, comedian, musician and entertainer. He is best known from his role as Pätkä in the Pekka and Pätkä films.

== Early life ==
Martti Elias Niemi was the youngest of the nine children of house painter and decorator Matti Niemi and Johanna Niemi. Already in his childhood Martti was musically gifted and took piano lessons at the Vyborg Academy of Music. His older brother Paavo Niemi was a wrestler. Martti "Masa" Niemi soon became a jack of many trades: he worked as an acrobat and a magician at a circus he had founded with his siblings. He also sang whenever he got the opportunity. Niemi is said to have taken magic lessons in Germany, but according to an interview of his nephew in Ilta-Sanomat this is only an urban legend.

Niemi also played bandy in the team Sudet, Vyborg despite his short stature (he was only 152 cm tall, about 5 feet ½ inch) and worked as the goalkeeper and captain of the team. In the late 1930s Niemi joined the band Sointupojat as a drummer, where Auvo Nuotio was the lead singer. Niemi's main profession was a car driver at the Viipurin Makkara Oy sausage factory up to the war.

In 1938 Niemi married Helvi Kilpeläinen (1920–1986) and the marriage lasted until Niemi's death. The couple had no children.

During the Continuation War Niemi worked as a comedian at the entertainment tours at the front line. During this time he moved to Helsinki where he played the drums at the nine-man band Sinipojat (formerly known as Sointupojat) who played for many years at the "Kirjan talo" house in Kruununhaka and at Mustikkamaa in summer time. Niemi also worked as a manager for the Musical Club of Vyborg. His main profession was an office assistant at a state office and as the editor and part-owner of the Matkatoveri magazine. He later started a career as a musician and an actor.

== Career ==
Niemi started his career as a drummer, but became popular as a comedian. He is most famous for his role as "Pätkä" (in English: Stub) in all thirteen original Pekka and Pätkä movies, with Esa Pakarinen as Pekka Puupää, Pätkä's best friend.

Niemi had made his first film role in the Fenno-Filmi film Suviyön salaisuus (1945) but at the time, this had been a one-off experiment. Niemi since made frequent appearances in selection castings for seven years, but never got a part. Auvo Nuotio got a selection casting for Niemi at Suomen Filmiteollisuus, which got him a small part in the film Kipparikvartetti. In the next year Niemi got a bigger part as "Läski-Leevi" in the film Esa "Flies" to Kuopio, starring Esa Pakarinen. The film was part of the contemporary proliferation of the rillumarei style of entertainment, which the critics thought was worthless but which the public loved.

Reino Helismaa noticed the 30 cm height difference between Niemi and Pakarinen as well as their natural way of working together as a comedic couple. They both got a role in the film Pekka Puupää where the short Niemi played Pätkä and the lead role of Pekka was played by the 181 cm tall Pakarinen. Ville Salminen reluctantly directed the film as his last work before moving to Fennada-Filmi. The film was a quickly and cheaply done light adventure that was not expected much of. After this Niemi made an appearance in SF's new director Armand Lohikoski's debut film We're Coming Back where he played a lumberjack. The first Pekka Puupää film was a great success, and the company started planning sequels right away. From 1953 to 1960 a total of twelve Puupää films were made, up to the pace of three films per year, and most of them were directed by Armand Lohikoski. Pätkä's signature phrase "I know it's none of my business, but..." became a popular catchphrase at the time.

Despite his popularity among the public, Niemi had difficulty in bearing the crushing negative reviews of the Puupää films, and he started becoming trapped in his role. Even though Niemi appeared in about ten other films in addition to the Puupää films, his only lead role was in the lighthearted military farce Majuri maantieltä. The critics wasted no words in their crushing negative reviews of his role. The film also angered the command of the Finnish Defence Forces so much that when SF asked for the army's help in filming The Unknown Soldier, the army strongly refused.

== Last years ==
During the next years Niemi had plenty of acting work. He appeared in an average of three films per year, went on gigs and appeared throughout Finland together with Esa Pakarinen, Reino Helismaa, Olavi Virta, Tapio Rautavaara and other popular actors and artists. He also worked as a drummer in Vili Vesterinen's and Arttu Suuntala's bands. His eight-year career as Pätkä and the character's great popularity took their toll on Niemi, and he started relieving his anguish with alcoholic beverages.

In his private life, Niemi was just as a funny guy as his character Pätkä and lived a life of constant theatre. However, he suffered from many problems beneath his role as a funny guy. He earned a large salary from each Puupää film, but spent all his money on alcohol and got in financial difficulties. He is said to have drunk at least a bottle and a half of Koskenkorva hard liquor every day.

The Niemis had to sell their apartment in downtown Helsinki and move into a rental apartment. Niemi also suffered from severe stage fright and self-criticism. His use of alcohol worsened over time and he had to undergo drug rehabilitation. This took its toll on the relationship between Niemi and Pakarinen, when the latter had to take care of Niemi who was not always fit for work. Even though they continued to work together, their relationship was left permanently cold.

=== Suicide ===
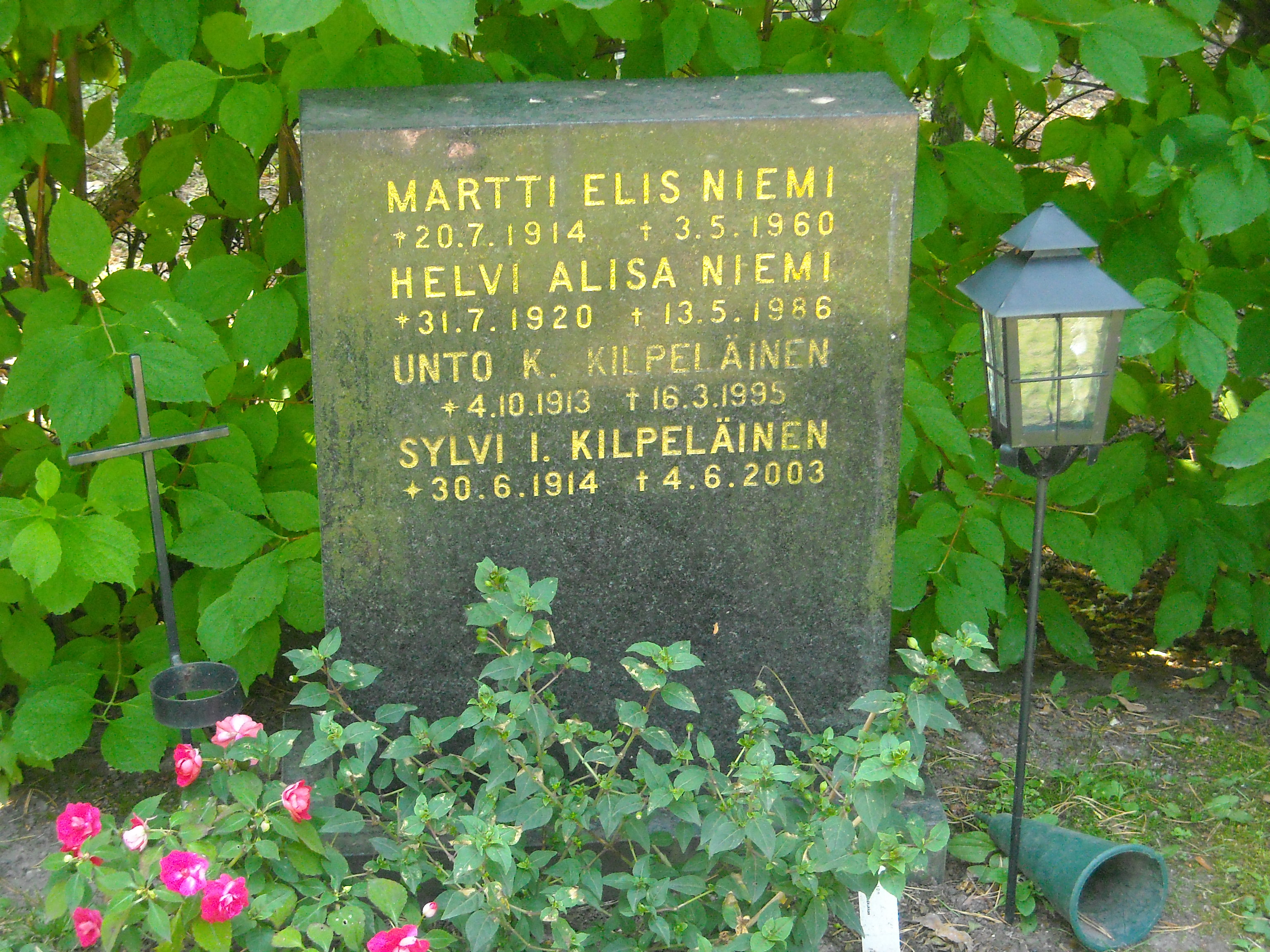
Masa Niemi's grave at the Hietaniemi cemetery in Helsinki.

Masa Niemi committed suicide in the outdoor hut of the Pyynikki swimming pool in Tampere by taking an overdose of sleeping pills on 30 April 1960. He died a couple of days later in hospital. Toivo Särkkä, the director of SF had announced that there would be no more Pekka and Pätkä films. This caused Niemi to go into depression and he felt his career was over. Niemi left a suicide note written on the back of a receipt from a cafeteria: "Hyvä on olla, kun on nolla. Hyvästi. – T. Masa." ("Life is a lull when you're a null. Goodbye. – Masa.") He never saw the premiere of his final film Kaks' tavallista Lahtista which was shown on 20 May 1960.

Masa Niemi was buried at the urn area of the Hietaniemi Cemetery (block 17, row 1, grave 2).

== Filmography ==
- Suviyön salaisuus (1945)
- Kipparikvartetti (1952)
- Lentävä kalakukko (Esa "Flies" to Kuopio) (1953)
- Pekka Puupää (1953)
- We're Coming Back (1953)
- Pekka Puupää kesälaitumilla (1953)
- Hei rillumarei! (1954)
- Pekka ja Pätkä lumimiehen jäljillä (1954)
- Taikayö (1954)
- Majuri maantieltä (1954)
- Pekka ja Pätkä puistotäteinä (1955)
- Kiinni on ja pysyy eli Pekan ja Pätkän uudet seikkailut (1955)
- Pekka ja Pätkä pahassa pulassa (1955)
- Pekka ja Pätkä ketjukolarissa (1957)
- Pekka ja Pätkä salapoliiseina (1957)
- Pekka ja Pätkä sammakkomiehinä (1957)
- Pekka ja Pätkä Suezilla (1958)
- Pekka ja Pätkä miljonääreinä (1958)
- Ei ruumiita makuuhuoneeseen (1959)
- Yks' tavallinen Virtanen (1959)
- Pekka ja Pätkä mestarimaalareina (1959)
- Isaskar Keturin ihmeelliset seikkailut (1960)
- Pekka ja Pätkä neekereinä (1960)
- Kaks' tavallista Lahtista (1960)
