= Esa Pakarinen =

Finnish actor and musician (1911–1989)

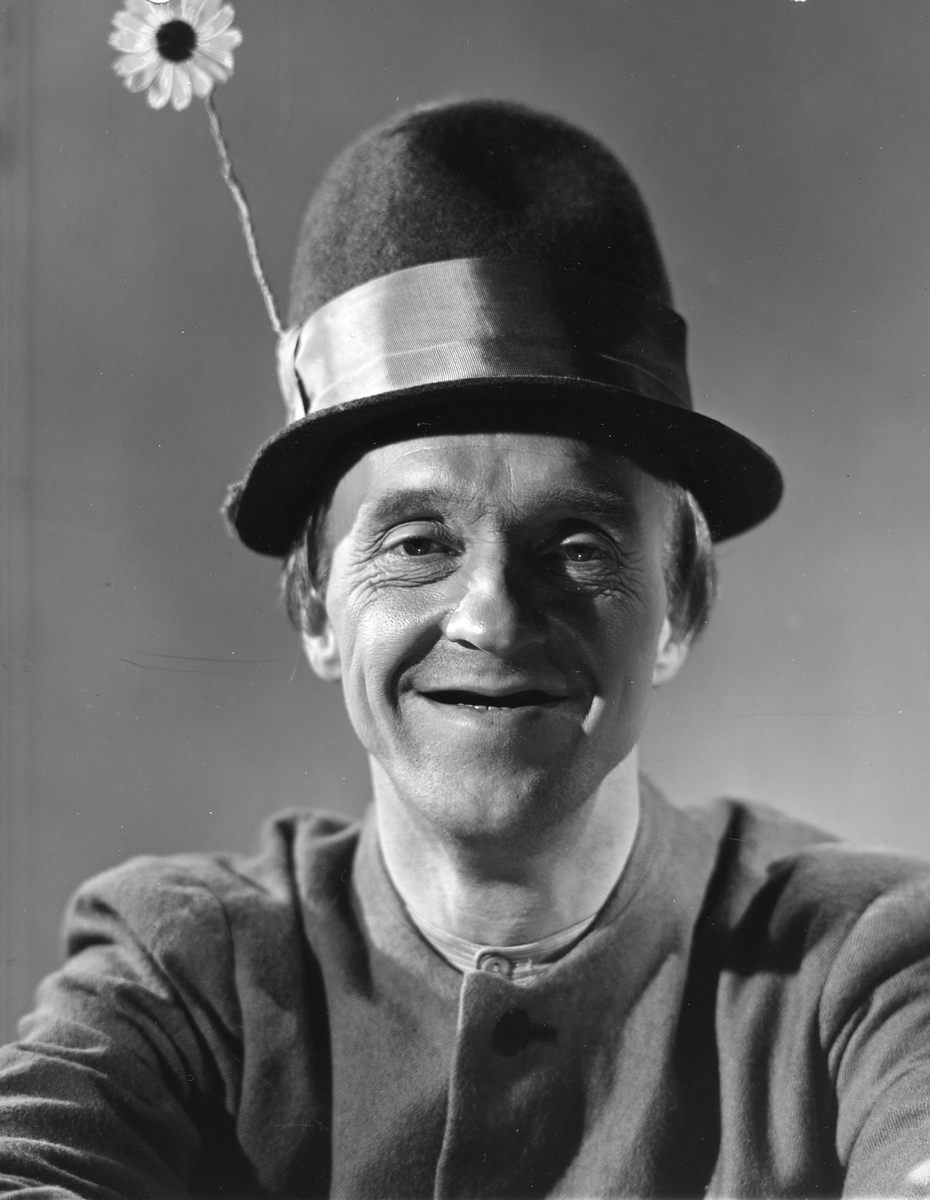
- Pakarinen as Pekka Puupää
- Born: Feeliks Esaias Pakarinen; 9 February 1911; Rääkkylä, Finland
- Died: 28 April 1989 (aged 78); Varkaus, Finland
- Other name: Severi Suhonen
- Occupations: Actor; singer; accordionist; comedian
- Years active: 1951–1988
- Spouses: Aino Juntunen (m. 1934; div. 1937) Orvokki Vesaranta (m. 1939; div. 1946) Elli Aho (m. 1947)
- Children: 2, including Esa Pakarinen Jr.
- Musical career
- Genres: Schlager; Cuplé; Rock and roll
- Instruments: Vocals; accordion
- Label: Warner Music Finland

Feeliks Esaias "Esa" Pakarinen (9 February 1911 – 28 April 1989) was a Finnish actor, singer, accordionist and comedian, best known for the role of Pekka Puupää in the Pekka and Pätkä films from 1953–1960. He was also a skilled, self-taught accordion player.

His son, Esa Pakarinen Jr. (1947–2026), was also an actor.

== Biography ==
=== Early life ===
Esa, officially Feeliks Esaias Pakarinen, was born on 9 February 1911 into the family of six children of the traveling village shoemaker Paavo Pakarinen (1882–1953) and Angeliina Hirvonen (1882–1965) in Rääkkylä, North Karelia. His father was a self-taught accordionist. At the beginning of the 1930s, in Joensuu, Esa acquired a five-line accordion from a rectified spirits trading bootlegger and then joined an amateur band called Keskiyö ("Midnight"). This was the beginning of a long career in music. After his release from military service, he studied sheet music and began taking piano lessons. To make a living, he did mixed work, doing playing chores only occasionally. At this point, he also played wind instruments on the band of the Worker's Association of Joensuu and acted in the local Workers' Theater. There he met his first wife, Aino Juntunen, with whom he had been married for three years during 1934–37.

The Winter War, which broke out in 1939, invited Esa Pakarinen to serve his homeland in an air defence battery near Jyväskylä, and, after the outbreak of the Continuation War, Pakarinen was assigned to an air defence battery in Haapamäki. There he played with Tauno Palo during the truce, e.g. in the play "Kihlaus" by Aleksis Kivi.

=== Musical career ===
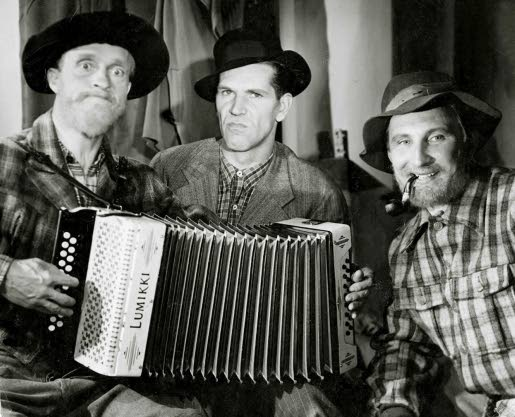
Pakarinen (left) with Reino Helismaa and Jorma Ikävalko in the 1951 film Rovaniemen markkinoilla

Pakarinen formed his own band called Rytmi ("Rhythm"). During this time, one of Pakarinen's popular side characters was also born. Esa used to fooling around with his tour partners without dentures; later, that toothless side character got a name from Reino Helismaa: Severi Suhonen. His great interest was already in music at that point, although it seemed very uncertain as his main profession.

He had an accordion with him and he took part in entertainment tours, where he performed e.g. with opera singer Aulikki Rautawaara. During the war, Esa Pakarinen also had time to accompany such favorite singers of the time as A. Aimo, Teijo Joutsela and Arttu Suuntala. When peace returned, he was a founding member of the band Jyväspojat in Jyväskylä, but it remained short-lived for him.

Pakarinen played for some time in the orchestra of the Jyväskylä Workers' Association and in the re-introduced accordion trio, until he moved to Lahti with his second wife, Orvokki Vesaranta. However, no jobs were found there, and after the divorce in 1946, he moved to Varkaus, where he formed a third band and also married his third wife, Elli Aho. Esa Pakarinen Jr. was born from this marriage. It is noteworthy that at this stage Esa Pakarinen, whose family roots are in Karelia, adopted his identity throughout the local dialect of Savonia with her new place of residence, and he later became acquainted with e.g. as an excellent Savonian comedian. In 1946, SAK ("Finnish Federation of Trade Unions") began organizing program tours featuring renowned artists such as Siiri Angerkoski, Eugen Malmstén and Viljo Vesterinen. Esa Pakarinen also took part. Inspired by Malmstén, he then included in his repertoire a toothless accordionist, Severi Suhonen, who developed into an even more popular performer than Esa Pakarinen himself. At the end of the 1940s, Esa Pakarinen joined the evening group of Reino Helismaa and Tapio Rautavaara. Rautavaara went his separate ways in the autumn of 1950, after which Pakarinen continued to accompany Helismaa. At that time, he also met the accordionist-composer Toivo Kärki and the singer-guitarist Jorma Ikävalko, who became the third, more serious member of the duo Helismaa-Pakarinen.

=== Film career ===
According to Suomi Filmi's film producer Toivo Särkkä, Toivo Kärki was attracted when this entertaining trio appeared at the Workers' House of Oulunkylä in early 1951. Särkkä noticed the trio's abilities and invited them to an experimental film for Suomi Filmi. In the summer of '51, the first "rillumarei" film was Rovaniemen markkinoilla, where Esa Pakarinen was first seen on the screen as the role of Severi Suhonen. The film was inspired by the jenkka of the same name by Kärki and Helismaa, who had previously become known to the people as a recording of Kauko Käyhkö, and also included the Severi Suhosen jenkka, composed by Pakarinen himself from lyrics by Repe Helismaa. The next record was recorded during the same year. The performances were the songs of Kärki and Helismaa, Lännen lokarin veli and Lentävä kalakukko, both of which also became known as the theme tunes of the films. Both were filmed immediately after the premiere of Rovaniemen markkinoilla, starring the new popular favorite Esa Pakarinen. During the 1950s and 60s, Esa Pakarinen was involved in a total of 20 films. In 1953, Rantasalmen sulttaani, directed by Eddie Stenberg under the nickname Outsider (Aarne Haapakoski), was completed, filmed mainly in North Africa in Tunisia.

Later that year, in connection with filming of Lentävä kalakukko, Esa Pakarinen also got to know Martti "Masa" Niemi, who then became known as Pätkä in the Puupää films. The first of the thirteen films in that series, Pekka Puupää, directed by Ville Salminen, premiered on the eve of May Day. At its best, the Puupää films were made in the mid-1950s with up to three films a year. The last of these was Pekka and Pätkä as Negroes, which was released in 1960 and was directed by Aarne Tarkas. The film series did not continue after Masa Niemi had committed suicide in 1960.

=== Final years ===
Esa Pakarinen was last seen in the role of a film Meiltähän tämä käy from 1973, directed by Matti Kassila. So the character Severi Suhonen, who was so popular, also turned out to be remarkably long-lived. Esa's film career had begun as Severi Suhonen, and that role also ended. In this film, Esa is seen as aging in the role of Severi Suhonen. The music in the film was provided by Toivo Kärki and Jaakko Salo, the lyrics were by Lauri Jauhiainen. During the 1960s, the time of traditional evening culture came to an end, and this could not have affected Pakarinen's work situation either. He started working as a baker in the department stores as Severi Suhonen, although he didn't particularly like this kind of activity. The pace of concert touring slowed down after he was diagnosed with both asthma and cardiac arrhythmias, and in 1974 he was awarded a sickness pension.

At the age of 63, in 1974, Esa Pakarinen once again made a bold conquest by singing rock. Esa Pakarinen's comeback culminated in a seminar held in 1978 in her hometown of Varkaus, which also featured his old buddies. As early as the early 1980s, Pakarinen continued to perform mainly on small occasions.

Esa Pakarinen died of cancer in his hometown of Varkaus on 28 April 1989.

== Filmography ==
- Rovaniemen markkinoilla (1951)
- Lännen lokarin veli (1952)
- Se alkoi sateessa (1953), in English It Began in the Rain
- Rantasalmen sulttaani (1953), in English Adventure in Morocco
- Lentävä kalakukko (1953), in English Esa Flies to Kuopio
- Pekka Puupää (1953)
- Pekka Puupää kesälaitumilla (1953), in English Pekka and Pätkä on a summer holiday
- Hei, rillumarei! (1954)
- Pekka ja Pätkä lumimiehen jäljillä (1954), in English Pekka and Pätkä tracing The Abominable Snowman
- Pekka ja Pätkä puistotäteinä (1955), in English Pekka and Pätkä as playground supervisors
- Kiinni on ja pysyy – Pekan ja Pätkän uusia seikkailuja (1955), in English Fixed and last aka the new adventures of Pekka and Pätkä
- Pekka ja Pätkä pahassa pulassa (1955), in English Pekka and Pätkä in big trouble
- Pekka ja Pätkä ketjukolarissa (1957), in English Pekka and Pätkä in a pile-up
- Pekka ja Pätkä salapoliiseina (1957), in English Pekka and Pätkä as private eyes
- Pekka ja Pätkä sammakkomiehinä (1957), in English Pekka and Pätkä as frogmen
- Pekka ja Pätkä Suezilla (1958), in English Pekka and Pätkä on Suez
- Pekka ja Pätkä miljonääreinä (1958), in English Pekka and Pätkä as millionaires
- Pekka ja Pätkä mestarimaalareina (1959), in English Pekka and Pätkä as master painters
- Pekka ja Pätkä neekereinä (1960), in English Pekka and Pätkä as negroes
- Mullin mallin (1961)
- Meiltähän tämä käy (1973)

== Discography ==
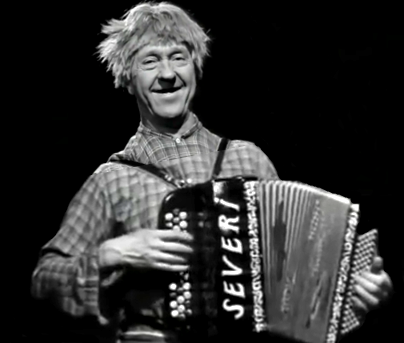
Pakarinen playing accordion.

=== Albums ===
- Esa Pakarinen – Severi Suhonen (1966)
- Severi Suhonen Ala-Tölöviöstä (1967)
- Lonkalta (with Irwin Goodman; 1971)
- Vihonviimeiset tangot (1972)
- Esa & Eemeli (with Esko Toivonen; 1972)
- Pakarock (1974)
- Pakarock 2 (1976)
- Maailman paras levy (1977)
- Severi kylymässä mualimassa (1979)
- Beat (1988)
- Savolaesta sanarrieskoo – Lauluja Kalle Väänäsen runoihin (1988)

=== Collections ===
- Esa Pakarinen (1968)
- Severin parhaat 1 (1972)
- Severin parhaat 2 (1974)
- Esa Pakarinen (1990)
- Unohtumattomat (1992)
- Rokki on poikaa (1997)
- Meiltähän tämä käy! Kaikki levytykset 1951–1988 (2011)
- Meiltähän tämä käy! 48 ikimuistoisinta kappaletta (2011)

== Sources ==
- Maarit Niiniluoto (1981). Esa Pakarinen – Hanuri ja hattu. WSOY.
- Jukka Pennanen & Kyösti Mutkala (1994). Reino Helismaa – Jätkäpoika ja runoilija. WSOY.
- Pekka Gronow, Jukka Lindfors & Jake Nyman (2004). Suomi Soi 1 – Tanssilavoilta tangomarkkinoille. Tammi.
- Tony Latva & Petri Tuunainen (2004). Iskelmän tähtitaivas – 500 suomalaista viihdetaiteilijaa. WSOY.
