= We're Coming Back =

- Theatrical poster
- Directed by: Armand Lohikoski
- Written by: Reino Helismaa
- Produced by: T.J. Särkkä
- Starring: Tuija Halonen; Tapio Rautavaara; Siiri Angerkoski
- Cinematography: Osmo Harkimo; Kauno Laine
- Edited by: Armas Vallasvuo
- Music by: Toivo Kärki
- Production company: Suomen Filmiteollisuus
- Distributed by: Suomen Filmiteollisuus
- Release date: 24 July 1953
- Running time: 66 minutes
- Country: Finland
- Language: Finnish

We're Coming Back (Finnish: Me tulemme taas) is a 1953 Finnish musical comedy film directed by Armand Lohikoski and starring Tuija Halonen, Tapio Rautavaara and Siiri Angerkoski.

== Partial cast ==
- Tuija Halonen as Satu
- Tapio Rautavaara as Olli
- Siiri Angerkoski as Kaisa, the widow
- Aku Korhonen as Alpertti
- Anneli Sauli as Katri Karkela
- Tommi Rinne as Minäpoika, lumberjack
- Åke Lindman as Kymppi, lumberjack boss
- Uuno Montonen as Valfriiti
- Masa Niemi as Reetrikki
- Veikko Linna as Konsta Karkela
- Armas Jokio as Jooseppi
- Kai Lappalainen as Eugen Karkela

== Bibliography ==
- John Sundholm. Historical Dictionary of Scandinavian Cinema. Scarecrow Press, 2012.
