= Pekka ja Pätkä puistotäteinä =

- Original Finnish film poster.
- Directed by: Armand Lohikoski
- Written by: Reino Helismaa
- Produced by: T. J. Särkkä
- Starring: Esa Pakarinen; Masa Niemi; Siiri Angerkoski; Risto Jussila
- Cinematography: Pentti Valkeala
- Edited by: Elmer Lahti
- Music by: Toivo Kärki
- Production company: Suomen Filmiteollisuus
- Release date: 4 March 1955
- Running time: 64 minutes
- Country: Finland
- Language: Finnish

Pekka and Pätkä as Park Nannies (Finnish: Pekka ja Pätkä puistotäteinä) is the fourth film in the Pekka Puupää series, directed by Armand Lohikoski and released in 1955.

== Plot ==
Pekka and Pätkä find themselves in one mishap after another. They try several jobs including car repair, gardening, painting, and store clerking. Notably, they dress as women to work as park attendants, giving the film its name.

They meet Otto, a boy abandoned by his drunk guardian, who is eventually reunited with his father, a returning sailor, after a series of comedic events.

== Cast ==
- Esa Pakarinen - Pekka Puupää
- Masa Niemi - Pätkä
- Siiri Angerkoski - Justiina Puupää
- Risto Jussila - Otto
- Eila Peitsalo - Anna-Liisa Raikas
- Olavi Virta - Antti Markkanen
- Armas Jokio - Pikkarainen

== Production ==
This film introduces the character Pikkarainen, played by Armas Jokio, who was originally intended to appear in Pekka ja Pätkä lumimiehen jäljillä.

The film was shot in different parts of Helsinki, such as Töölö in the winter garden, Kumpula land swimming pool, Eira on Tähtitorninmäki, Hakaniemi on Säästöpankinranta, Jätkäsaari and Hietalahti market.

== Reception ==
The film was poorly received by contemporary critics, except for the performance of Risto Jussila as Otto, who was praised as a natural child actor. The film was nevertheless successful with audiences.
