= Pekka ja Pätkä lumimiehen jäljillä =

- Original Finnish film poster.
- Directed by: Armand Lohikoski
- Written by: Armand Lohikoski; Reino Helismaa
- Produced by: T. J. Särkkä
- Starring: Esa Pakarinen; Masa Niemi; Siiri Angerkoski; Anneli Sauli
- Cinematography: Osmo Harkimo; Pentti Unho
- Edited by: Armas Vallasvuo
- Music by: Toivo Kärki
- Production company: Suomen Filmiteollisuus
- Release date: 30 July 1954
- Running time: 90 minutes
- Country: Finland
- Language: Finnish

Pekka and Pätkä on the Trail of the Snowman (Finnish: Pekka ja Pätkä lumimiehen jäljillä) is a 1954 Finnish film directed by Armand Lohikoski. It is the third installment in the thirteen-film Pekka Puupää series. The film, co-written by Lohikoski and Reino Helismaa, marks the first time the character Pätkä appears in the film's title. However, according to Lohikoski, Helismaa had no involvement in this or some other Pekka ja Pätkä films.

The film was shot in Kilpisjärvi. Cast members have stated that the idea of the Yeti came from a newspaper article. Continuing the Pekka ja Pätkä series was a clear decision for Suomen Filmiteollisuus, which advertised for a nearly two-meter-tall actor to play the Yeti. The role went to Helsinki resident Vihtori Välimäki.

Pekka ja Pätkä lumimiehen jäljillä incorporates elements reminiscent of horror films. Notable scenes include Pätkä climbing a wall and Justiina being used as bait for the Yeti.

== Reviews ==
A 2012 review in TV-maailma highlighted the film's pleasant easygoing atmosphere.

== Plot ==
On April Fools' Day, Justiina sends Pekka and Pätkä shopping. They are puzzled by the shopping list's mention of "skis" until they read the day's newspaper, which reports a Yeti sighting in Lapland and a million-mark reward for its capture by radio host Karvajärvi. Assuming Justiina wants them to hunt the Yeti, they buy ski gear. At home, they realize the list said "scissors," but Justiina is enthusiastic about the Yeti hunt.

The trio travels to Lapland to find the Yeti, with Pekka and Pätkä believing Justiina can act as bait. On the train, they meet Timo Vaske, played by Olavi Virta, and Katriina Sirkkunen, played by Anneli Sauli. Timo is the identical twin of Kalevi Vaske, a character from the previous film, which causes initial confusion for Pekka. In Kilpisjärvi, the group stays at a mountain hotel, where Timo's girlfriend Irmeli Laavu (Tuija Halonen) and ski instructor Riku Sundman (Åke Lindman) are also present. The romantic entanglements are resolved when Timo ends up with Katriina and Riku with Irmeli.

Pekka, Pätkä, and Justiina venture into the snowy wilderness, where they celebrate finding the "North Pole." Their joy is interrupted by the appearance of the Yeti, causing Pekka and Pätkä to faint as the Yeti absconds with Justiina. Believing the Yeti has eaten her, they return to the hotel only to find the Yeti peacefully knitting with Justiina.

The trio returns south with a bundle they believe contains the Yeti. However, at the radio station, they discover the million-mark reward was an April Fools' joke, and the bundle actually contains Justiina, whom the Yeti had wrapped up. In the film's final scene, the Yeti is seen wandering freely in the snowy expanses of Lapland.

== Cast ==
- Esa Pakarinen as Pekka Puupää
- Masa Niemi as Pätkä
- Siiri Angerkoski as Justiina Puupää
- Anneli Sauli as Katriina Sirkkunen
- Tuija Halonen as Irmeli Laavu
- Olavi Virta as Timo Vaske
- Åke Lindman as Riku Sundman
- Vihtori Välimäki as the Yeti
- Helli Saikkonen as a woman on the street
- Unto Kuhankoski as the janitor
- Lasse Saxelin as a passerby/tourist
- Pentti Irjala as the constable
- Fiinu Autio as Sunkreenska
- Selma Ruusunen as a member of Justiina's sewing circle
- Hilly Lindqvist as a member of Justiina's sewing circle
- Jalmari Parikka as the train dispatcher
- Juhani Kumpulainen as the train driver
- Heikki Packalén as the stoker Salminen
