= Rovaniemen markkinoilla =

1951 Finnish film directed by Jorma Nortimo

- Original Finnish film poster
- Directed by: Jorma Nortimo
- Written by: Reino Helismaa
- Produced by: T.J. Särkkä
- Starring: Esa Pakarinen; Reino Helismaa; Jorma Ikävalko
- Cinematography: Pentti Unho; Kauno Laine
- Edited by: Armas Vallasvuo
- Music by: Toivo Kärki
- Production company: Suomen Filmiteollisuus
- Distributed by: Suomen Filmiteollisuus
- Release date: 23 November 1951
- Running time: 79 minutes
- Country: Finland
- Language: Finnish
- Budget: FIM 7.2 million

Rovaniemen markkinoilla (Swedish: Marknad i Rovaniemi, also At the Rovaniemi Fair in English translation) is a 1951 Finnish comedy film directed by Jorma Nortimo and starring Esa Pakarinen, Reino Helismaa and Jorma Ikävalko.

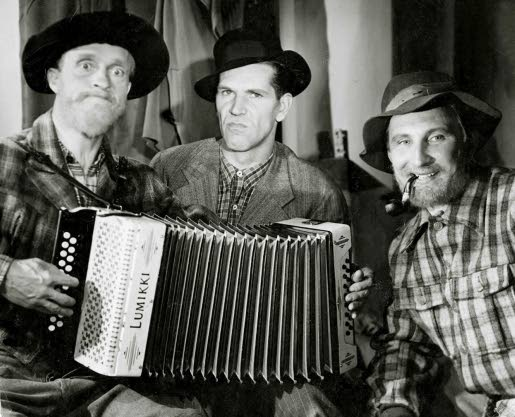
From left to right: Esa Pakarinen, Reino Helismaa and Jorma Ikävalko.

The film was inspired by Reino Helismaa's song lyrics "Rovaniemen markkinoilla", and it was Helismaa's first screenplay. The film was shot in Helsinki, Inari and Rovaniemi during the summer of 1951 and its production costs were 7.2 million Finnish marks.

The film represents the so-called "Rillumarei films", a comedic song or couplet types films full of the pride of workers' and carefree guys, which were loved by the audience, but very hated by critics. Rovaniemen markkinoilla was also received negatively by critics at the time, but the film's appreciation grew over time, and despite the "shortcomings of the narrative", it has been considered "an honest whole as a record of the times."

The film's sequel, Hei, rillumarei!, was released in 1954.

== Plot ==
Two tramps, Severi Suhonen and Julle Iloinen, and poor geologist Roope Kormu travel by train to Lapland to mine for gold. They encounter the ruthless Hanski of Rovaniemi, whose henchman Ville tricks the men into buying a worthless property. However, the friends turn the trick to their advantage.

== Cast ==
- Esa Pakarinen as Severi Suhonen
- Reino Helismaa as Roope Kormu
- Jorma Ikävalko as Julle Iloinen
- Jorma Nortimo as Hannes Ropponen or "Hanski of Rovaniemi"
- Veikko Uusimäki as Ville of Vuotua
- Mai-Brit Heljo as Hulda of Kemijärvi
- Siiri Angerkoski as Mimmi Lötjönen or "Mimmi of Muhos"
- Marja Korhonen as Sylvi the Beauty
- Kalle Rouni as Mikko

== See also ==
- Cinema of Finland
- List of Finnish films of the 1950s
- Lapland gold rush

== Sources ==
- Kalliomäki, Petteri. "At the Rovaniemi Fair". Midnight Sun Film Festival.
