= Pekka Puupää (film) =

- Original Finnish film poster
- Directed by: Ville Salminen
- Written by: Reino Helismaa
- Produced by: T.J. Särkkä
- Starring: Esa Pakarinen; Masa Niemi; Siiri Angerkoski; Tuija Halonen; Tapio Rautavaara
- Cinematography: Kauno Laine
- Edited by: Armas Vallasvuo
- Music by: Toivo Kärki
- Production company: Suomen Filmiteollisuus
- Distributed by: Suomen Filmiteollisuus
- Release date: 30 April 1953
- Running time: 71 minutes
- Country: Finland
- Language: Finnish
- Budget: FIM 6.7 million

Pekka Puupää (Swedish: Kalle Träskalle, also Pete Blockhead in English translation) is a 1953 Finnish comedy film directed by Ville Salminen and starring Esa Pakarinen, Masa Niemi and Siiri Angerkoski. It is the first film of the Pekka and Pätkä film series based on the comics by the same name created by Ola Fogelberg.

The film was largely made on the same sets as Esa "Flies" to Kuopio, which came out in the same year and was also directed by Ville Salminen. Esa Pakarinen also wore exactly the same basic costume in every Pekka and Pätkä film. The film was shot in the winter and spring of 1953 and its production costs were 6.7 million Finnish marks.

Although not much was expected from the movie based on the comic book, it was surprisingly successful, which led to twelve sequels. On television, the film was shown in 1965 on the Yle TV1 channel and it was watched by 1.6 million viewers. However, critics have never appreciated the loved film by the audience, let alone its sequels. Today critics consider that the "slapstick movie" has only nostalgic values, nothing more. Many critics turned their mocking into "art" and used the most imaginative puns and metaphors. Also, despite appearing in the film and its sequels as well, the actress Siiri Angerkoski never appreciated these films but considered them "idle-day nonsense".

== Plot ==
Pätkä (Masa Niemi) and Pekka Puupää (Esa Pakarinen) trying to take care of baby in the film.

Mrs. Justiina Puupää (Siiri Angerkoski) goes to visit her relatives and leaves her husband Pekka Puupää (Esa Pakarinen) to be a housekeeper in Helsinki. Pekka and his best friend Pätkä (Masa Niemi) immediately start thinking about plans to earn money, because Justiina has not left Pekka any money but has done huge grocery shopping in advance. In the beginning, Pekka and Pätkä sell all the food door to door, and then with the money they earn, they place an advertisement in the newspaper about "Pekka Puupää's kindergarten". At the same time, a petty criminal named Petteri (Åke Lindman) steals a millionaire's (Arvo Lehesmaa) baby. He flees the scene in a taxi, whose driver Erkki Saarikivi (Tapio Rautavaara) is unaware of his client's criminal activities. Seeing the police, Petteri runs away to an apartment building and hides the baby in Puupää's apartment. Saarikivi follows because Petteri didn't pay for his trip, but Petteri knocks the taxi driver unconscious and hides him in the apartment next door. When Pekka and Pätkä come home and find the baby, they imagine their nursery getting its first customer with the newspaper advertisement. Their neighbor Miss Ritva Ranta (Tuija Halonen), on the other hand, is horrified when she finds an unconscious Saarikivi in her apartment, but after clearing up misunderstandings, the two end up on a date.

Pekka and Pätkä's childcare methods turn out to be unnecessarily eccentric and inexperienced, as they feed the baby läskisoosi and rock the baby to sleep in the ceiling lamp. Miss Ranta is horrified when she sees this and briskly teaches the men proper childcare. However, "Pekka Puupää's Kindergarten" does not attract customers, so Pekka and Pätkä develop a new way of raising money, participating in a match against boxer Hermanni Ronski (Uljas Kandolin). Due to a mistake, Pätkä gets into the match instead of Pekka. Pätkä is at the bottom until Ronski takes a sip from Pätkä's camphor bottle – which, due to the messy state of Puupää's medicine cabinet, contains sleeping potion – and falls asleep in the middle of the match. In the meantime, the child has been left outside to sleep in the carriage by Pekka and Pätkä, and Petteri, who is passing by, steals it again, but is soon caught by mistake in the same taxi driven by Saarikivi, whereupon Saarikivi recognizes him and takes him to the police station. After this, Justiina Puupää has arrived back home and after seeing it in a messed up, she prepares to punish her husband, but Saarikivi clears up the situation after hearing at the police station that Pekka and Pätkä were in the care of the millionaire's kidnapped child. Finally, the grateful millionaire gives Pekka and Pätkä a handsome reward for taking care of his child.

== Cast ==
- Esa Pakarinen as Pekka Puupää
- Masa Niemi as Pätkä
- Siiri Angerkoski as Justiina Puupää
- Tuija Halonen as Ritva Ranta
- Tapio Rautavaara as taxi driver Erkki Saarikivi
- Åke Lindman as Petteri
- Arvo Lehesmaa as millionaire
- Uljas Kandolin as Hermanni Ronski
