= Hilja maitotyttö =

- US film poster
- Directed by: T. J. Särkkä
- Written by: Juha Nevalainen
- Based on: Hilja the Milkmaid by Johannes Linnankoski
- Produced by: T. J. Särkkä
- Starring: Anneli Sauli; Saulo Haarla; Tauno Palo
- Music by: Harry Bergström
- Release date: 1953
- Running time: 87 minutes
- Country: Finland
- Language: Finnish
- Budget: FIM 9,276,733

Hilja maitotyttö (English translation The Milkmaid) is a 1953 Finnish drama film directed by T. J. Särkkä, and starred Anneli Sauli, Saulo Haarla and Tauno Palo. A film is based on the 1913 short story "Hilja the Milkmaid" by Johannes Linnankoski. When it premiered in Finland, the film caused a stir and controversy due to its eroticism and the rape scene included in the story; however, the erotic content guaranteed the sale of the film to a dozen other countries.

== Cast ==
- Anneli Sauli as Hilja, a milk maid
- Saulo Haarla as Yrjö, a high school graduate
- Tauno Palo as Kalevi, a householder
- Laina Laine as Hilja's mother
- Kirsti Ortola as Katri, a cattle girl

The film's director is seen in a cameo role as a summer guest on the dance stage.
