= Sakari Halonen =

Finnish singer and actor (1923–1992)

- Born: 6 September 1923; Kuopio, Finland
- Died: 27 June 1992 (aged 68); Helsinki, Finland
- Occupation: Actor
- Years active: 1949–1978 (film & TV)

Sakari Halonen (1923–1992) was a Finnish singer and stage, film and television actor.

== Selected filmography ==
- The General's Fiancée (1951)
- The Millionaire Recruit (1953)
