= Anneli Sauli =

Finnish actress (1932–2022)

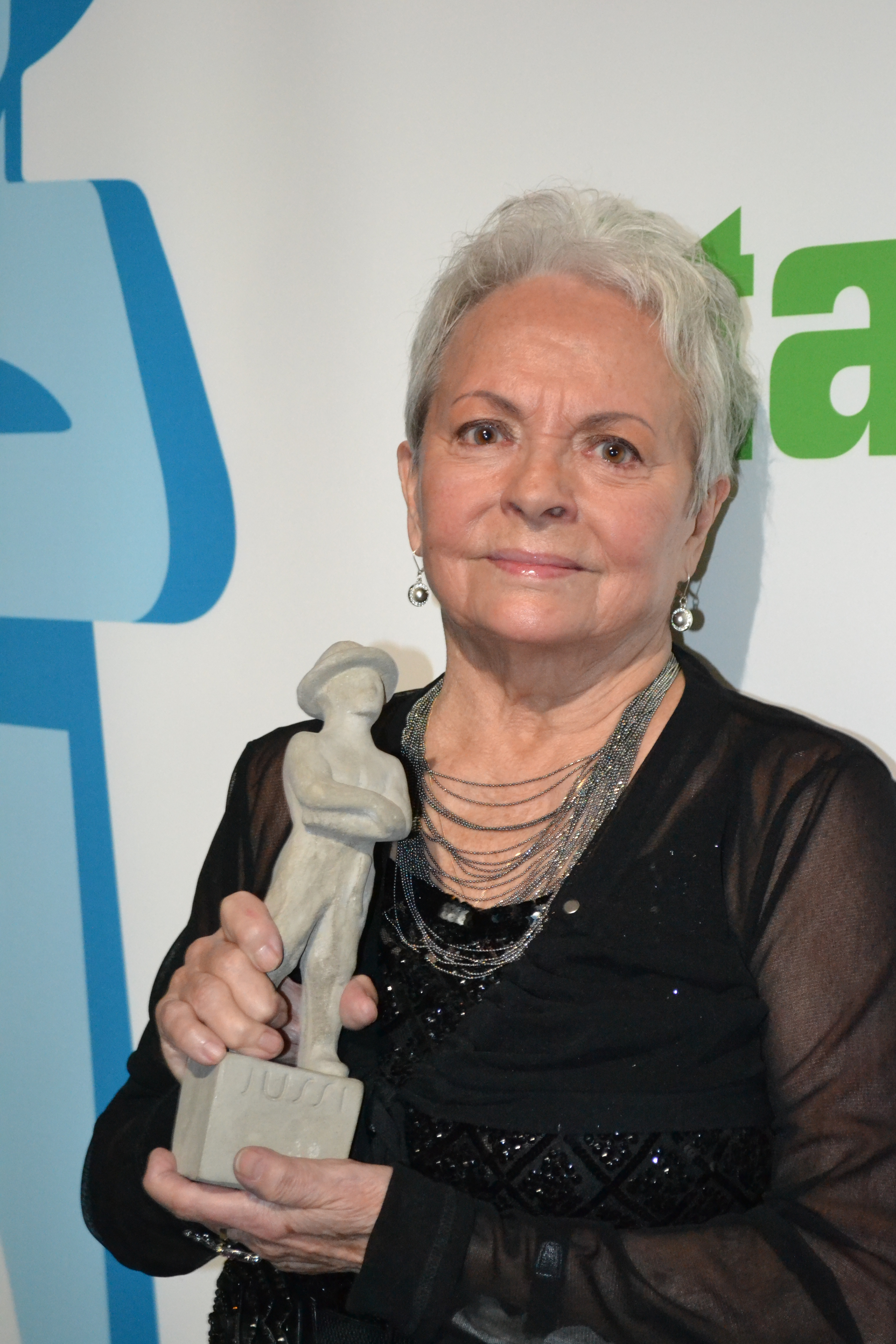
- Sauli in 2013 with a Jussi Award for lifetime achievement in film
- Born: Anneli Helena Savolainen; 6 August 1932; Pyhäjoki, Finland
- Died: 15 March 2022 (aged 89); Helsinki, Finland
- Other names: Ann Savo; Anneli Helena Lindman; Anneli Helena Pakkasvirta
- Occupation: Actress
- Years active: 1953–2020

Anneli Sauli (6 August 1932 – 15 March 2022) was a Finnish film actress. She appeared in more than 40 films since 1953. She starred in the film Miriam, which was entered into the 8th Berlin International Film Festival. She was born in Pyhäjoki, Finland to a Finnish Romani father, Valdemar Schwartz, and a Finnish mother, Salli Maria Heikkilä. From the late 1950s to the early 1960s she lived and worked in West Germany using the name Ann Savo.

Sauli was married to film director-actor Åke Lindman from 1956 to 1962, and to director-actor Jaakko Pakkasvirta from 1965 to 1968. She had one daughter, Johanna Lahtela.

Sauli died in Helsinki on 15 March 2022, at the age of 89.

== Selected filmography ==
- We Come During Spring (1953)
- The Milkmaid (1953)
- Pekka ja Pätkä lumimiehen jäljillä (1954)
- 1918 (1957)
- Miriam (1957)
- No Tomorrow (1957)
- Restless Night (1958)
- Moonwolf (1959)
- Mrs. Warren's Profession (1960)
- The Dead Eyes of London (1961)
- Doctor Sibelius (1962)
- The Testament of Dr. Mabuse (1962)
- The Seventh Victim (1964)
- Der Hexer (1964)
- Let Not One Devil Cross the Bridge (1968)
- A Baltic Tragedy (1970)
- The Man Without a Past (2002)
