= Olavi Virta =

Finnish singer (1915–1972)

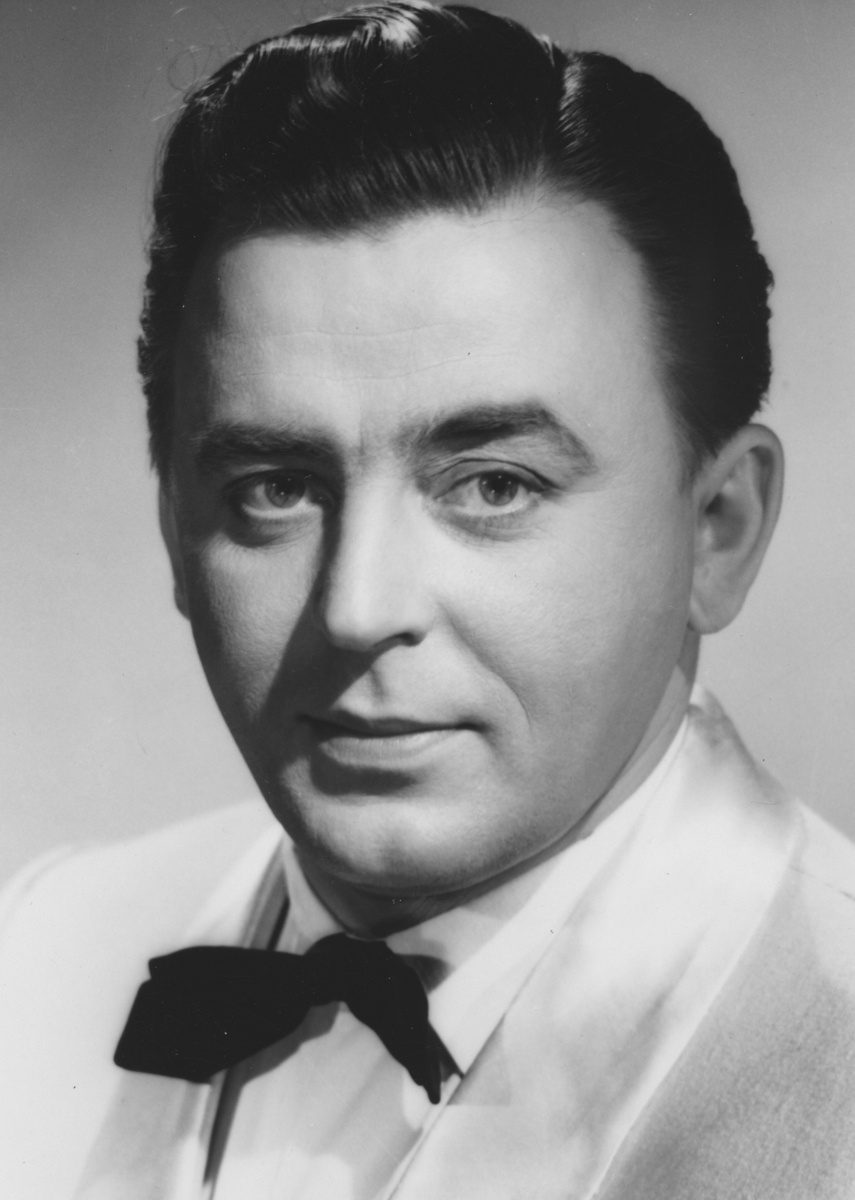
- Olavi Virta in the 1950s

Background information
- Born: Oskari Olavi Ilmén; 27 February 1915; Sysmä, Grand Duchy of Finland
- Died: 14 July 1972 (aged 57) Pispala, Tampere, Finland
- Genres: Finnish tango
- Occupations: Songwriter; actor
- Years active: 1939–1966
- Labels: Warner Music Finland

Olavi Virta (born Oskari Olavi Ilmén; 27 February 1915 – 14 July 1972) was a Finnish singer, acclaimed during his time as the "King" of Finnish tango.

== Life and career ==
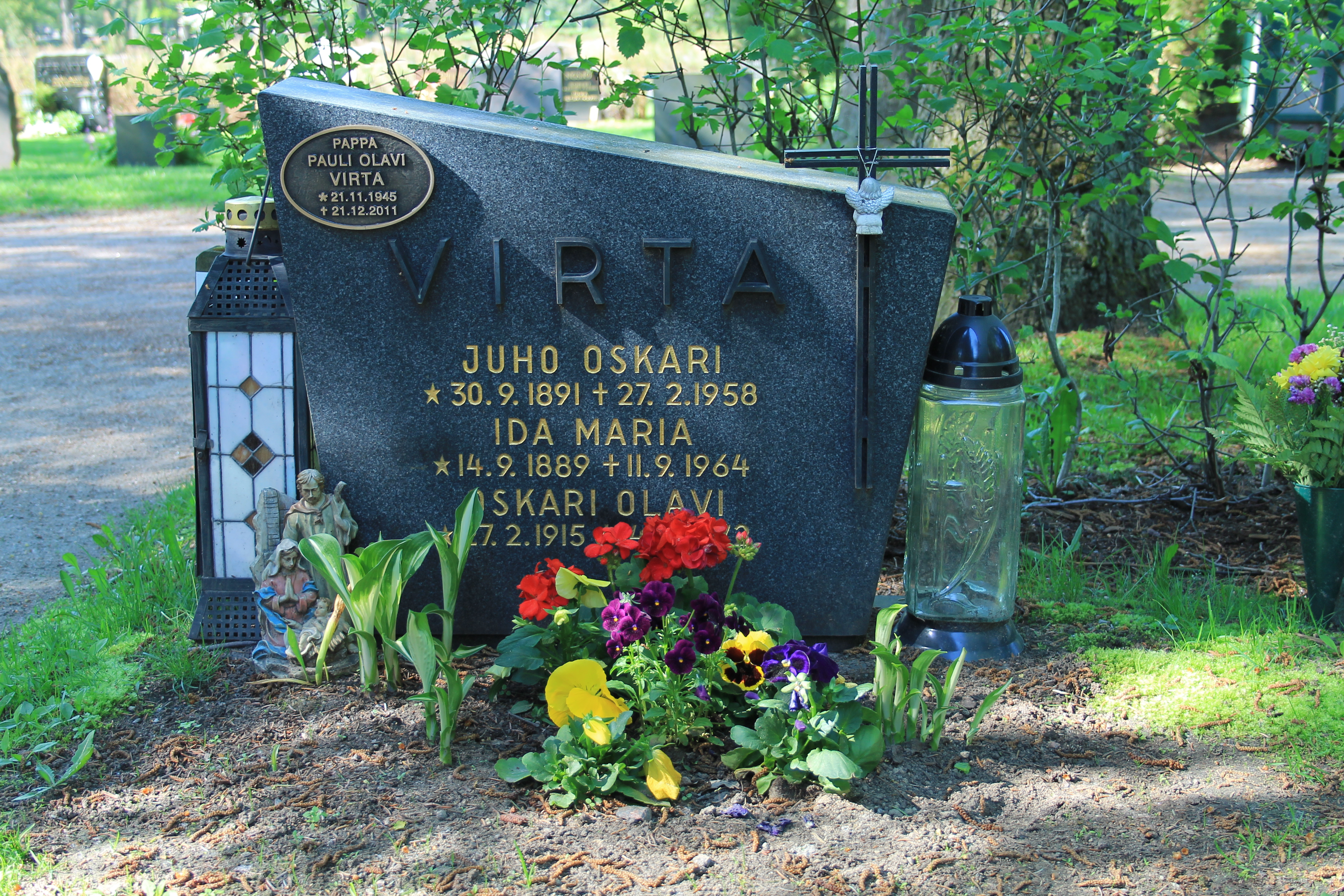
Gravestone of Olavi Virta at the Malmi Cemetery.

Virta was born on 27 February 1915 in Sysmä, Grand Duchy of Finland. Between 1939 and 1966 he recorded almost 600 songs, many of which are classics of Finnish popular music, and appeared in many films and theatrical productions. Of his most acclaimed tangos are "Punatukkaiselle tytölleni" ("For My Red Haired Girl"), "Ennen kuolemaa" ("Before Death"; French: Avant de Mourir) and "Täysikuu" ("Full Moon"), while standouts from his other popular songs are "Poika varjoisalta kujalta" ("Boy From a Shady Alley"; Italian: Guaglione), "Hopeinen kuu" ("Silver Moon"; Italian: Guarda Che Luna), "Eva" and "Kultainen nuoruus" ("The Golden Youth"). He was also the second tenor of the quartet Kipparikvartetti in the early 1950s.

At the beginning of his career he received three gold records for the songs "Ennen kuolemaa", "Tulisuudelma" (El Choclo) and "La Cumparsita". Virta also acted in sixteen different Finnish films, including ones of the then-popular Pekka Puupää series. When he began his career in 1939, he was marketed as the "Bing Crosby of Finland." He has also been compared to the American singer-actor Frank Sinatra.

Virta was very much popular in the 1950s in Finland. However, around 1959 is when his life began to turn in another direction. His wife Irene, whom he had three children with, left him and moved to Sweden in that year, and he began having health issues from an ever augmenting problem with alcoholism, diabetes, and a stroke. His career was cut short one night when he was arrested for drunken driving in Ilomantsi in 1962, after which the press mockingly called him "The Singing Meatball." Ten years later he succumbed to alcoholism, living his final years in poverty. Virta died in Pispala, Tampere on 14 July 1972 and was buried in the Malmi Cemetery.

== Legacy ==
His influence in contemporary Finnish music has not been forgotten, and today a number of Finnish Schlager singers cite him as a particular role model or influence when it comes to the realm of music. At least one movie about his life, simply titled Olavi Virta and debuting in October 2018, has been produced, as well as a documentary by Finnish film director and historian Peter von Bagh. He was one of the ten people to be chosen by the upcoming Finnish Music Hall of Fame museum due to be opened in Helsinki.

== Film career ==
Virta played in various films:

- Rikas tyttö (1939) (band's lead vocalist)
- SF-paraati (1940)
- Nuoria ihmisiä (1943)
- Kalle Aaltosen morsian (1948)
- Hallin Janne (1950)
- Kaunis Veera eli Ballaadi Saimaalta (1950)
- Vihaan sinua – rakas (1952)
- Kipparikvartetti (1952)
- Pekka Puupää kesälaitumilla (1953)
- Minä soitan sinulle illalla (1954)
- Pekka ja Pätkä lumimiehen jäljillä (1954
- Kaksi vanhaa tukkijätkää (1954)
- Pekka ja Pätkä puistotäteinä (1955)
- Rakas varkaani (1957)
- Suuri sävelparaati (1959)
- Iskelmäkaruselli pyörii (1960)

Documentary films featuring Virta:

- Iskelmäparaati (1939) (band's lead vocalist)
- Olavi Virta (1972, dir. Peter von Bagh)
- Olavi Virta (1987, dir. Peter von Bagh)

== Discography ==
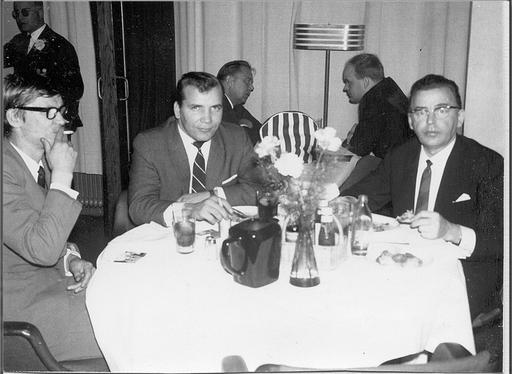
Juha Vainio, Eino Grön and Olavi Virta in 1965

(Post-mortem compilations)

- 1997: Suomiviihteen legendat
- 2005: Mestari - legendan ääni elää
- 2011: Arkistojen aarteita vol. 1
- 2013: Laulaja - Kaikki levytykset
