= 1918 (1957 film) =

1957 film

- Original Finnish film poster
- Directed by: Toivo Särkkä
- Written by: Toivo Särkkä; Ilmari Unho
- Based on: Gehenna och ljusstrålen (play) and En man och hans samvete (novel) by Jarl Hemmer
- Produced by: Toivo Särkkä
- Starring: Åke Lindman
- Cinematography: Marius Raichi
- Edited by: Elmer Lahti
- Release date: 20 September 1957
- Running time: 96 minutes
- Country: Finland
- Language: Finnish

1918 is a 1957 Finnish war film directed by Toivo Särkkä. It is based on the play and novel by Jarl Hemmer. The events of the film take place during the Finnish Civil War of 1918. It was entered into the 7th Berlin International Film Festival.

== Cast ==
- Åke Lindman as Samuel Bro
- Anneli Sauli as Essi Söderman
- Ture Ara as Ceder (as Tuure Ara)
- Matti Aulos as Humalainen
- Kerttu Björlin as Avustaja
- Sirkka Breider as Naisvanki
- Kyösti Erämaa as Tuomiokapitulin jäsen
- Kaarlo Halttunen as Patruuna Bro
- Oiva Sala as Tuomiokapitulin jäsen
