= Jorma Nortimo =

Finnish film director, screenwriter and actor (1906–1958)

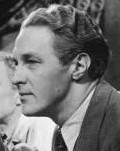

Jorma Kustaa Olavi Nortimo (originally Nieminen, 20 January 1906 – 2 July 1958) was a Finnish film director, screenwriter and actor who also served as a managing director for three different theatres. In films, he started as an actor in 1936 and directed his first film two years later.

== Selected filmography ==
- Pohjalaisia (1936) actor
- Lapatossu (1937) actor
- Syyllisiäkö? (1938) director
- Synnin puumerkki (1942) director
- The Dead Man Loses His Temper (1944) director and actor
- Katarina kaunis leski (1950) actor
- Rovaniemen markkinoilla (1951) director and actor
- Pikku Ilona ja hänen karitsansa (1957) director
