= Pentti Irjala =

Finnish actor

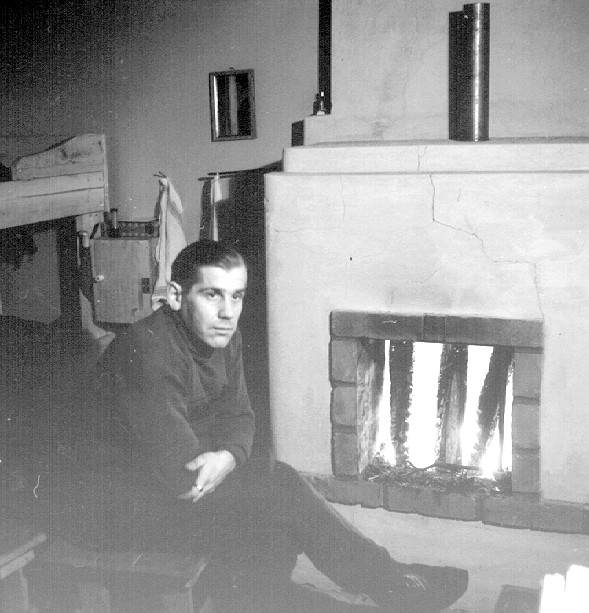
Pentti Irjala

Pentti Irjala (23 September 1911 – 25 June 1982) was a Finnish actor.

== Career ==
Since 1959, Irjala worked for the Finnish National Theatre. He appeared in over a hundred films, making him the actor with one of the longest careers in Finnish film history. He always had supporting roles in films, and was often seen in comic old man roles.

Irjala was awarded the Pro Finlandia medal in 1972.

== Personal life ==
Irjala was married to actress Pia Hattara (1923–2015) since the 1940s. He is buried in the Hietaniemi Cemetery in Helsinki.

== Selected filmography ==
- Isäntä soittaa hanuria (1949)
- Radio tekee murron (1951)
- Rikollinen nainen (1952)
- Valkoinen peura (1952)
- Pekka Puupää (1953)
- Opri (1954)
- Pekka ja Pätkä lumimiehen jäljillä (1954)
- Hilman päivät (1954)
- The Unknown Soldier (1955)
- Silja – nuorena nukkunut (1956)
- Elokuu (1956)
- Inspector Palmu's Mistake (1960)
- Kultainen vasikka (1961)
- Akseli and Elina (1970)
- Natalia (1979)
