= Tapio Rautavaara =

Finnish singer and actor (1915–1979)

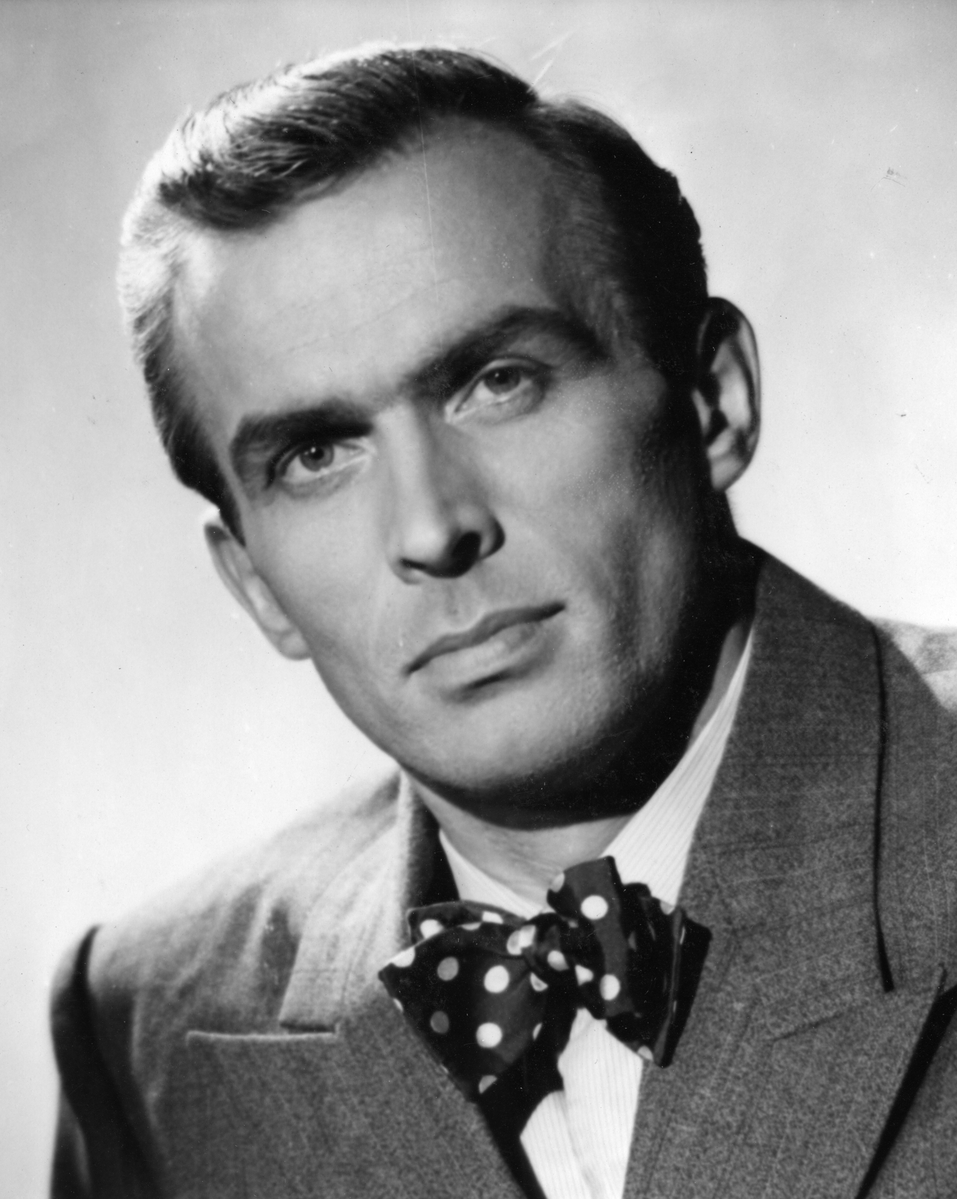

Personal information
- Born: 8 March 1915 Pirkkala, Grand Duchy of Finland, Russian Empire
- Died: 25 September 1979 (aged 64) Helsinki, Finland
- Height: 189 cm (6 ft 2 in)
- Weight: 85–87 kg (187–192 lb)

Sport
- Sport: Athletics, archery
- Event: Javelin throw
- Club: Oulunkylän Tähti, Helsinki

Achievements and titles
- Personal best: 75.47 m (1945)
Medal record
Representing Finland
athletics
Olympic Games
Gold medal – first place	1948 London	Javelin throw
European Championships
Bronze medal – third place	1946 Oslo	Javelin throw
Men's archery
World Championships
Gold medal – first place	1958 Brussels	Team
Silver medal – second place	1955 Helsinki	Team

Kaj Tapio Rautavaara (8 March 1915 – 25 September 1979) was a Finnish singer (bass-baritone), athlete and film actor.

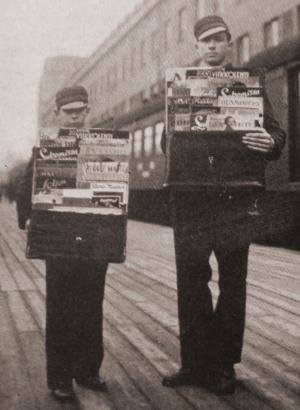
Rautavaara (right) selling magazines at a railway station in Helsinki, 1931.

== Life ==
=== Early years ===
Tapio Rautavaara was born in the municipality of Pirkkala (now Nokia), a suburb of the industrial city of Tampere, as the son of Henrik Kerttula and Hilda Rautavaara. Just three weeks later, his mother moved to the Helsinki suburb of Oulunkylä, where she had lived before. Rautavaara's father was rarely at home, and soon left the family permanently. In 1921, Tapio and his mother moved to Tampere. Rautavaara used to have conflicts with his conservative teachers due to his working-class background. Tapio earned pocket money by selling socialist papers for local workers of the Finlayson textile factory. Four years later, the family returned Oulunkylä, where Rautavaara lived the rest of his life.

In the late 1920s, Rautavaara joined the local working-class sports club Oulunkylän Tähti (″Oulunkylä Star″) for practicing athletics. Rautavaara's formal education ended at the elementary level. By the outbreak of the Finnish Winter War in 1939, he had worked as a newspaper boy, roadworker, lumberjack and as a storeman at a co-operative mill. His national military service was with the Finnish Navy in the mid-1930s.

=== War time ===
When the Winter War broke out the Navy was not very active in the war and Rautavaara was allowed to continue working at the Osuustukkukauppa (OTK) mill. However, when the Continuation War broke out he was called to the army and he was assigned to the front line for the first year of the war. In the summer of 1942, Rautavaara was transferred to the war entertainment corps and worked for two years as a radio journalist in the frontier based Aunus Radio. During this time he became a known figure to the serving troops. In the summer of 1944 the Finns had to pull out from East Karelia and Rautavaara's radio career ended.

=== Sports career ===
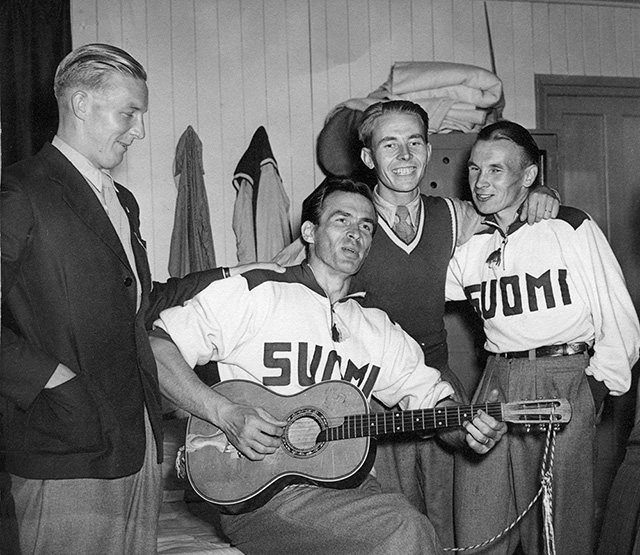
Kuuno Honkonen, Tapio Rautavaara, Pentti Siltaloppi and Salomon Könönen at the 1948 Olympics

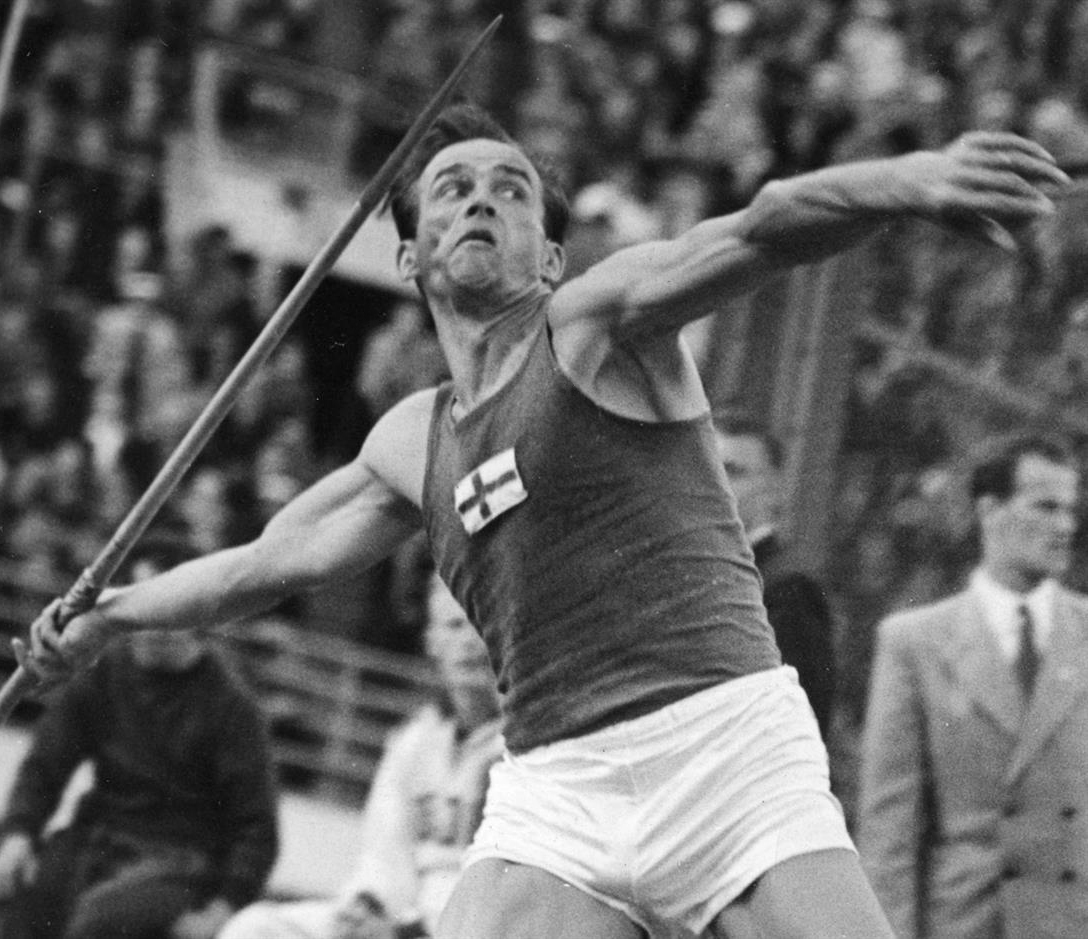
Rautavaara in 1949

Rautavaara was a talented javelin thrower and archer. In 1937, he represented the Finnish Workers' Sports Federation at the Workers' Olympiads in Antwerp, finishing second in the javelin throw after his countrymen Erkki Autonen. After the World War II, Rautavaara won a European bronze medal in 1946, an Olympic gold medal in 1948, and five national titles in 1944–45, and 1947–49. He placed fifth at the 1950 European Championships. In archery Rautavaara won a team gold medal at the 1958 World Championships and a national title in 1955.

=== Music and acting career ===
After the war Rautavaara met Reino Helismaa, who composed and made the lyrics to Reissumies ja kissa (The Traveler and the Cat), which became Rautavaara's first hit. Composer Toivo Kärki joined this team, which produced over the next ten years many popular songs. In addition, Rautavaara composed and wrote the lyrics for many of his records. Rautavaara received gold records for the songs Isoisän olkihattu (Grandpa's Strawhat), Vain merimies voi tietää (Only a Sailor Could Know) and Häävalssi (The Wedding Waltz). The first song was written and composed by Rautavaara, the second one was composed by him and the lyrics were written by Heikki Saari.

Rautavaara, Helismaa and Esa Pakarinen toured Finland together at the end of the 1940s and the beginning of the 1950s. The touring stopped due to personal problems, but Rautavaara continued to record songs with Helismaa's lyrics until Helismaa's death in 1965. By the time of his death in 1979 Rautavaara had recorded about 300 songs.

Rautavaara became one of the most beloved singers in Finland. Some of his famous songs include Isoisän olkihattu (Grandfather's Straw Hat), Reppu ja reissumies (The Backpack and the Traveler), Korttipakka (The Deck of Cards), Lapin jenkka (The Lappland Schottische), Juokse sinä humma (Run, Horse, Run), Kulkuri ja joutsen (The Tramp and the Swan), Tuopin jäljet (Marks of the Tankard), Sininen uni (Blue Dream) and Anttilan keväthuumaus (Anttila's Spring Fever).

Rautavaara was cast as the protagonist in numerous Finnish films, and was also supposedly a candidate for the part of Tarzan after Johnny Weissmuller had quit his career.

=== Later years ===
The peak of Rautavaara's popularity was in the 1950s, stretching into the early years of the 1960s. After that, his music was left in the shadow of rautalanka and tango music and the popularity of the television. He continued to perform regularly, however, right up until his death, even though his gigs in the 1970s were for smaller audiences, such as in department stores and topping out ceremonies.

== Death and tributes ==
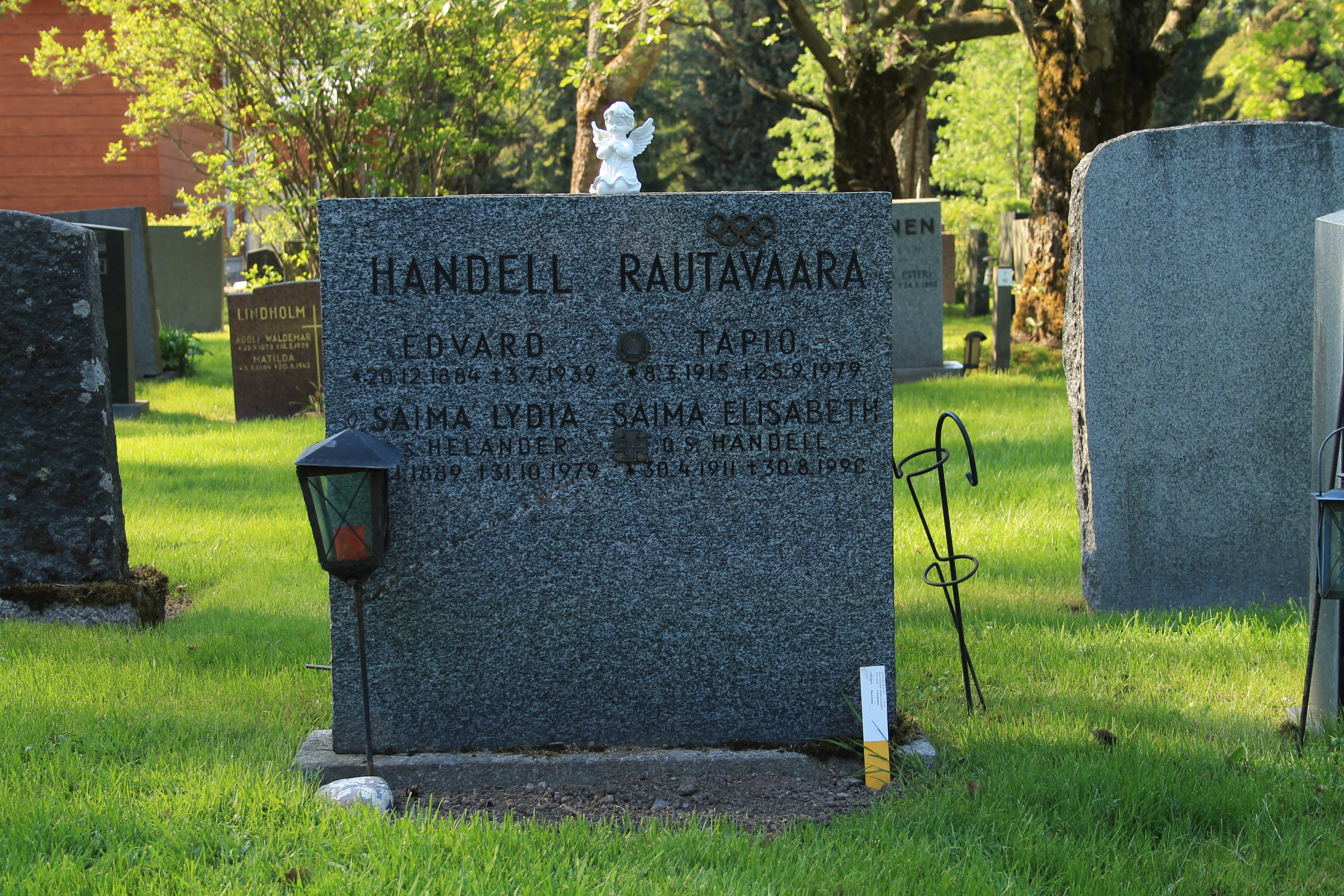
Gravestone of Tapio Rautavaara at the Malmi Cemetery, Finland

On 25 September 1979 Tapio Rautavaara had been at the Tikkurila Swimming Center in Vantaa taking photographs for the book Kultaa, kunniaa, kyyneleitä (Finnish for "Gold, glory, tears") along with photographer Pentti Pekkala. After he had gone to the sauna, Rautavaara slipped and hit his head on the floor. He was taken to a nearby health center, where his injuries were not taken seriously, as staff believed him to be drunk. His head was bandaged and he was sent home. His wife and daughters laid him on a mattress on the floor of his office room at his home in Oulunkylä to sleep. The next night, he died as a result of a cerebral hemorrhage. His wife told their daughter that he had gone. When the daughter asked where to, her mother replied "No, he's dead."

Rautavaara was buried in the Malmi Cemetery in Malmi, Helsinki.

=== Memorial ===
A memorial by Veikko Myller entitled Kulkurin uni ("A Vagabond's Dream") to the memory of Rautavaara is located in the market square in central Oulunkylä, the district of Helsinki, where Rautavaara lived most of his life.

=== TV documentary and film ===
Peter von Bagh created a TV documentary on Rautavaara entitled Tapsa at the time of Rautavaara's death in 1979. Timo Koivusalo used Rautavaara's and Helismaa's tours as the basis for his film Kulkuri ja joutsen in 1999.

=== Play ===
In spring 2007 the Nokia Workers' theatre presented a play entitled Sininen uni (The Blue Dream), which was based on his life.

== Rautavaara's influence on later groups ==
Ville Valo, the frontman of the Finnish rock band HIM, regards Rautavaara as his greatest idol in Finnish music.

== Rautavaara's most renowned recordings ==
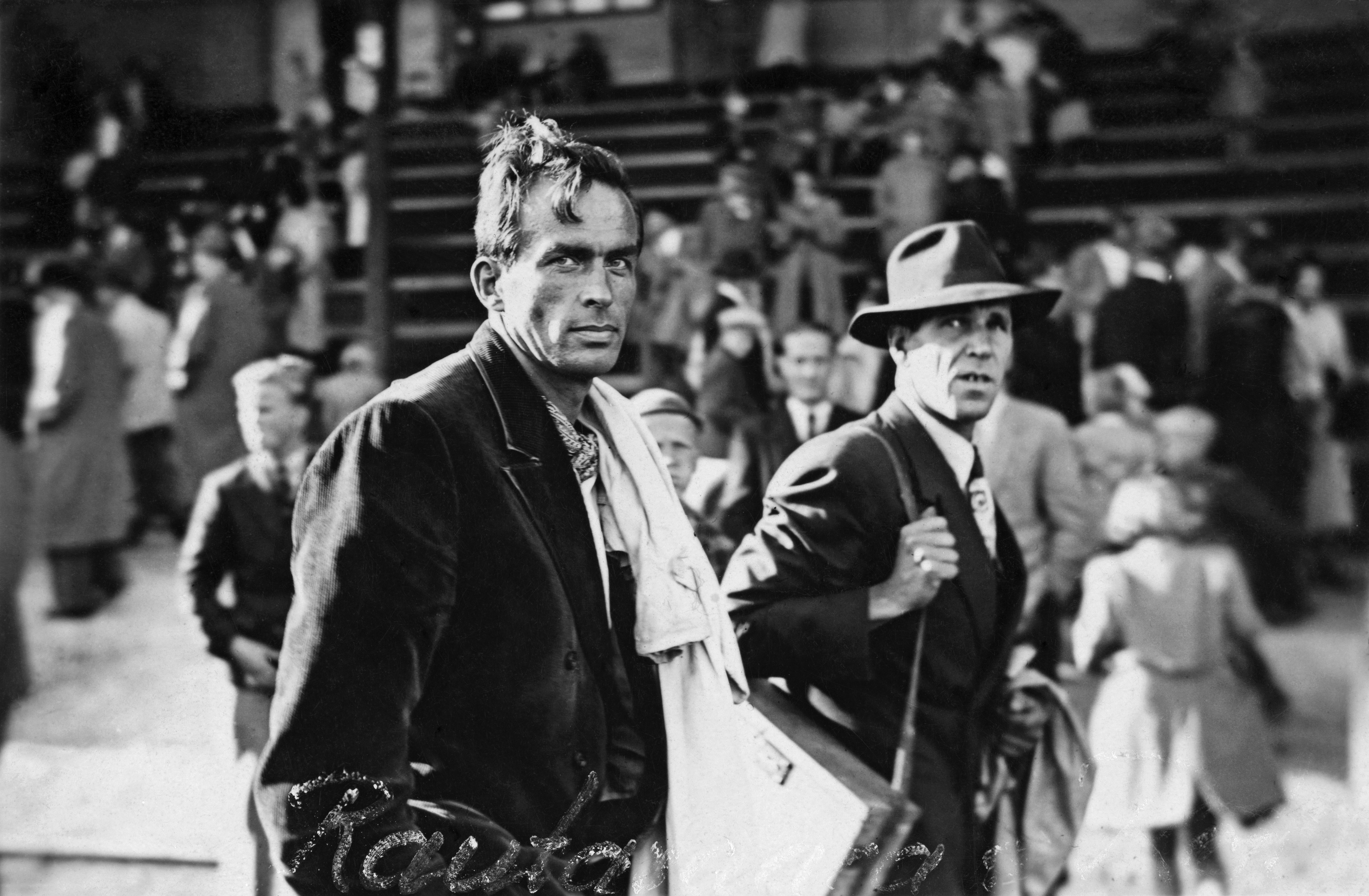
Tapio Rautavaara and Reino Helismaa back in 1950

- Päivänsäde ja menninkäinen (The Sunbeam and the Troll), 1949/1965
- Reissumies ja kissa (The Tramp and the Cat), 1949
- Kulkuri ja joutsen (The Tramp and the Swan), 1950
- Isoisän olkihattu (Grandfathers Strawhat), 1951/1963
- Ontuva Eriksson (Limping Eriksson), 1951
- Sininen uni (Blue Dream), 1952
- Juokse sinä humma (Run, Horse), 1953
- Kulkuriveljeni Jan (My Drifter Brother Jan), 1956
- Yölinjalla, (I Walk the Line), 1962
- Tuopin jäljet (The Marks of My Tankard), 1963
- En päivääkään vaihtaisi pois (I Wouldn't Change A Day), 1979

== Rautavaara's filmography ==
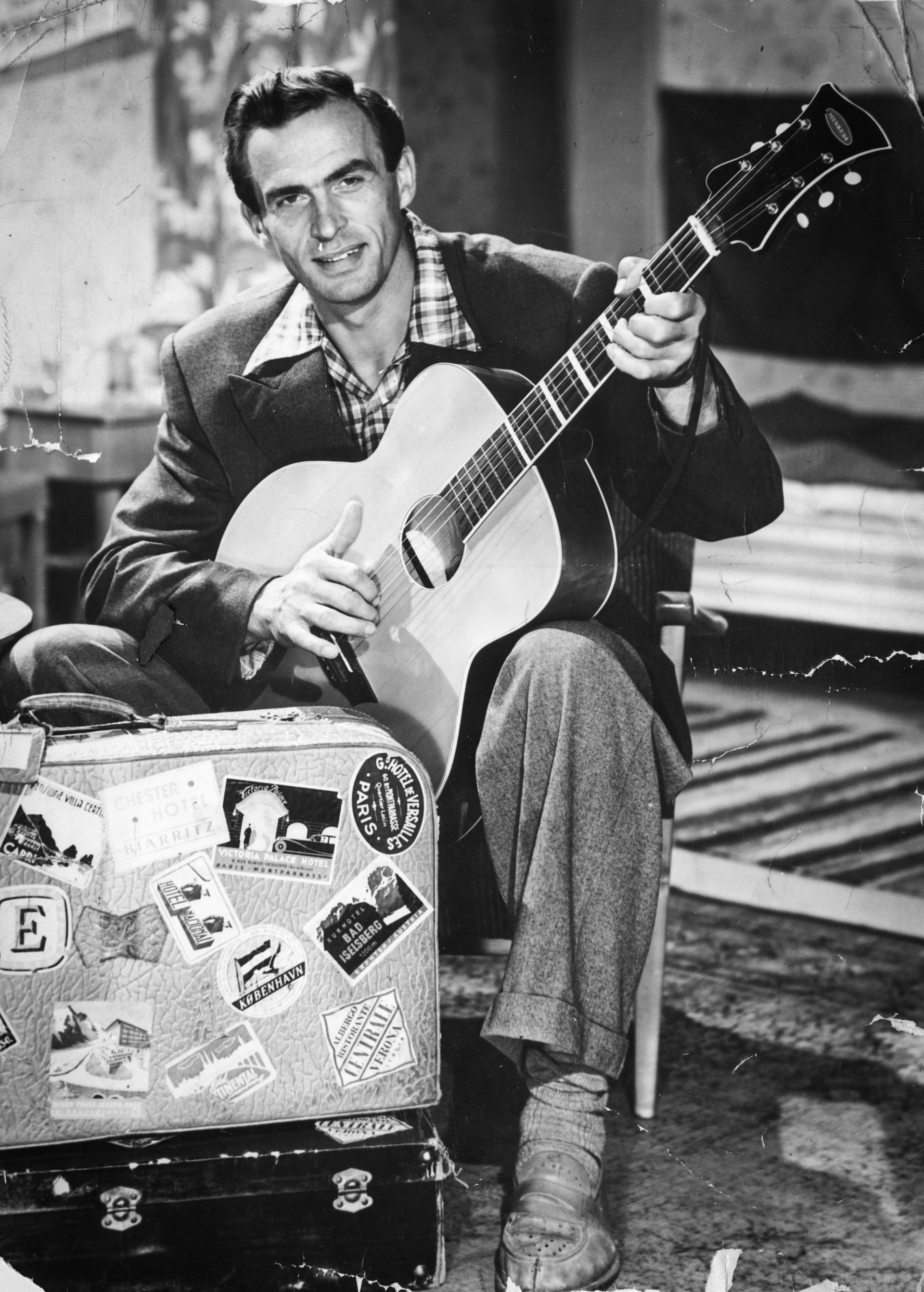
Publicity photograph for Song of Smuggler from 1952.

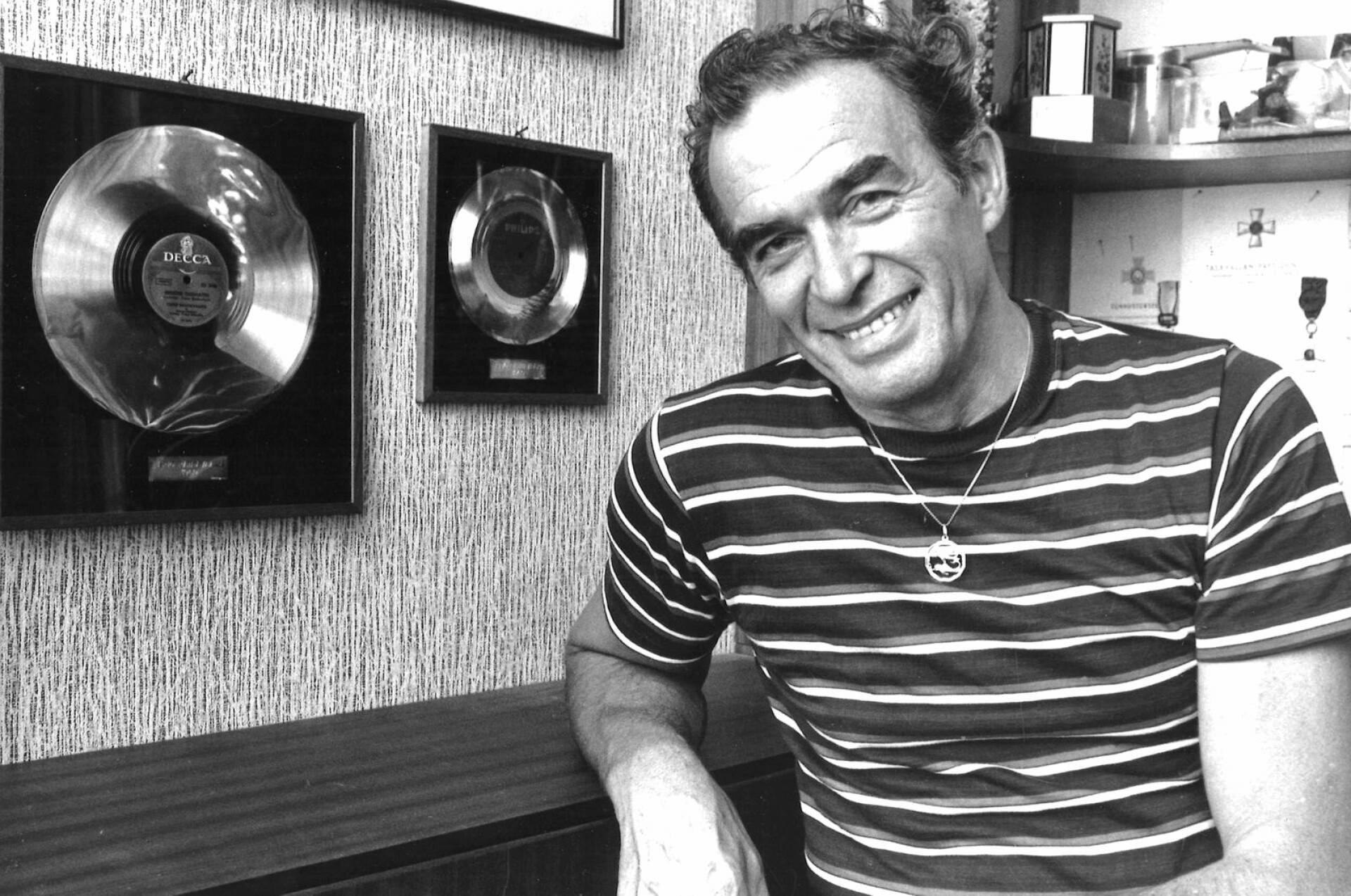
Rautavaara at his home in 1971.

- Vain sinulle (1945) (Only for you)
- Synnin jäljet (1946) (Marks of sin)
- Kuudes käsky (1947) (Sixth order)
- Kultamitalivaimo (1947)
- Sinut minä tahdon (1949) (I Want You)
- Aila, Pohjolan tytär (1951) (Aila, Daughter of North)
- Rion yö (1951) (Night of Rio)
- Salakuljettajan laulu (1952) (Song of smuggler)
- Pekka Puupää (1953)
- 2 hauskaa vekkulia (1953) (2 funny guys)
- Me tulemme taas (1953) (We are coming again)
- We Come During Spring (1953)
- Kummituskievari (1954)
- Veteraanin voitto (1955)
- Villi Pohjola (1955) (Wild North)
- Kaunis Kaarina (1955)
- No Tomorrow (1957)
- Kahden ladun poikki (1958)
- Molskis, sanoi Eemeli, molskis! (1960)
- Tähtisumua (1961)
- X-Paroni (1964)
- Anna (1970)

== See also ==
- List of best-selling music artists in Finland
