= Armand Lohikoski =

Finnish American film director and screenwriter (1912–2005)

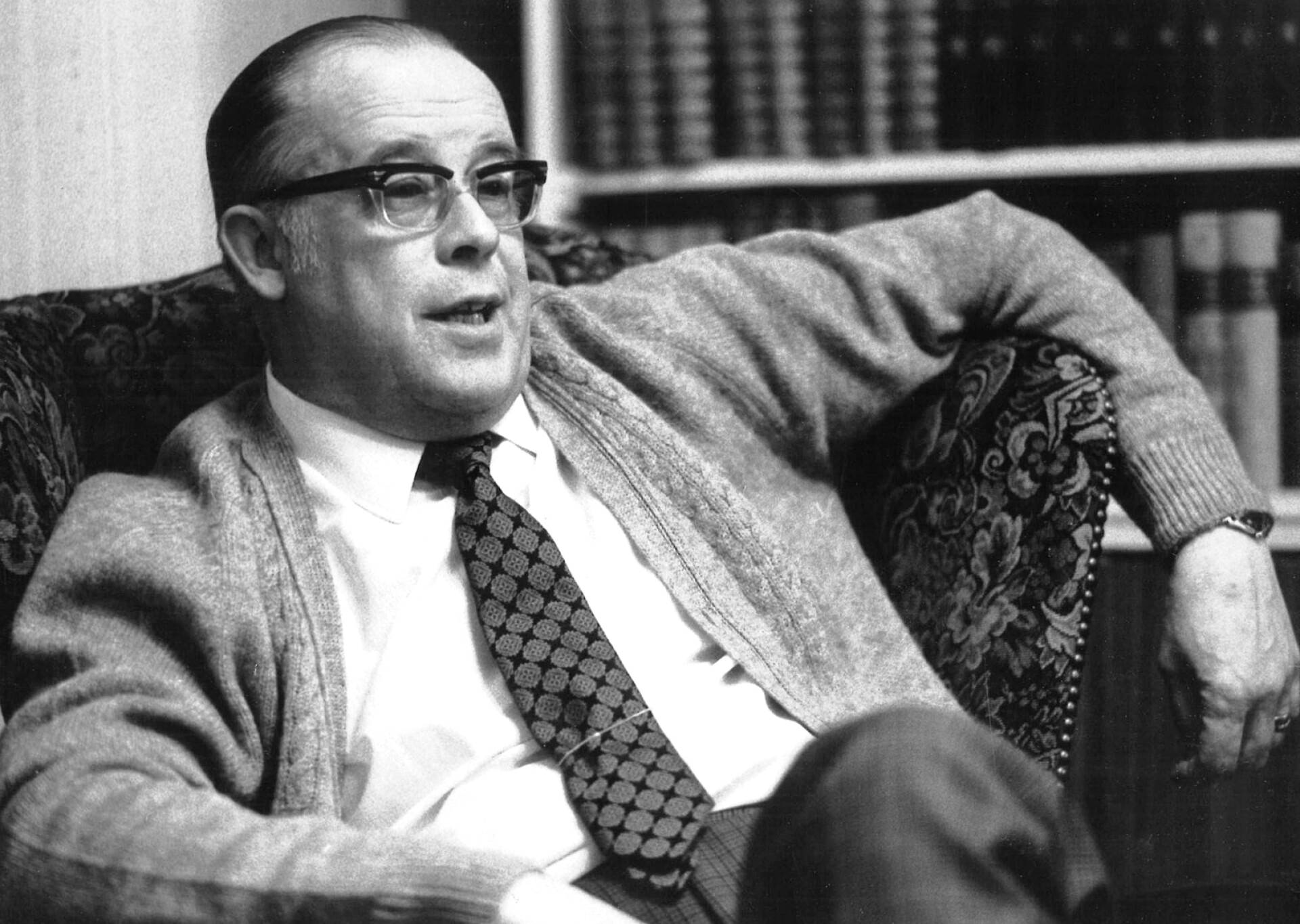
- Born: Armand Uolevi Pernu; January 3, 1912; Astoria, Oregon, United States
- Died: March 20, 2005 (aged 93); Helsinki
- Education: University of Helsinki
- Occupation: Film director
- Employer: Suomen Filmiteollisuus

Armand Uolevi Lohikoski (January 3, 1912 – March 20, 2005) was a Finnish movie director and writer. He is best known as a director of a number of Pekka ja Pätkä movies.

== Career ==
Before his career as a film director Armand Lohikoski had a long career in the media industry. He was, among other occupations, a journalist, a division director in the Finnish Broadcasting Company (where he produced the first radio quiz in Finland), and a head of the Helsinki office of Metro-Goldwyn-Mayer Films. He was also the first to publish free newspapers in Finland.

Armand Lohikoski directed 18 long movies for the major Finnish movie production company Suomen Filmiteollisuus. In addition, he directed many short films and commercials. Both before and during his directing career, he took part in acting. He acted in some of his own films.

Lohikoski wrote a travel book Dollari on lujassa in 1946 of the famous Helsinki based student choir, YL Male Voice Choir, visit to United States after the World War II. He wrote his own biography Mies Puupää-filmien takaa in 1993 and an aphorisms book Sattuvasti Sanottua in 2002.

== Death ==
He died after a short illness in Helsinki.

== Filmography ==
=== Director ===
- Island Girl, 1953
- Me tulemme taas, 1953
- Pekka Puupää kesälaitumilla, 1953
- Hei, rillumarei!, 1954
- Minä soitan sinulle illalla, 1954
- Pekka ja Pätkä lumimiehen jäljillä, 1954
- Pekka ja Pätkä puistotäteinä, 1955
- Kiinni on ja pysyy, 1955
- Pekka ja Pätkä pahassa pulassa, 1955
- Risti ja liekki, 1957
- Pekka ja Pätkä ketjukolarissa, 1957
- Pekka ja Pätkä salapoliiseina, 1957
- Pekka ja Pätkä sammakkomiehinä, 1957
- Kahden ladun poikki, 1958
- Pekka ja Pätkä Suezilla, 1958
- Pekka ja Pätkä miljonääreinä, 1958
- Pekka ja Pätkä mestarimaalareina, 1959
- Kohtalo tekee siirron, 1959
- Taape tähtenä, 1962

=== Writer ===
- Pekka ja Pätkä lumimiehen jäljillä, 1954
- Pekka ja Pätkä ketjukolarissa, 1957
- Pekka ja Pätkä salapoliiseina, 1957
- Pekka ja Pätkä sammakkomiehinä, 1957
- Pekka ja Pätkä Suezilla, 1958
- Pekka ja Pätkä miljonääreinä, 1958
- Pekka ja Pätkä mestarimaalareina, 1959
- Kohtalo tekee siirron, 1959
- Taape tähtenä, 1962

=== Actor ===
- Ryhmy ja Romppainen, 1941, Doorman
- Synnin puumerkkki, 1942, Factory owner
- Tyttö astuu elämään, 1943, Colonel's assistant
- Varjoja Kannaksella, 1943, Customs officer
- Tähtireportterit tulevat, 1945, Robber
- Pekka ja Pätkä pahassa pulassa, 1955, Radio voice
- Kiinni on ja pysyy, 1955, Shopkeeper
- Pekka ja Pätkä ketjukolarissa, 1957, Professor Karhu
- Pekka ja Pätkä Suezilla, 1958, Suez air control
