= Ville Salminen =

Finnish film director (1908–1992)

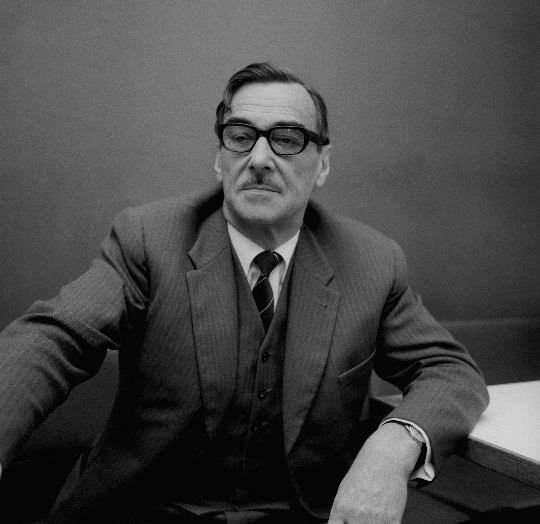
- Born: Veikko Oskari Ville Salminen; 2 October 1908; Mariehamn, Finland
- Died: 28 November 1992 (aged 84); Qarteira, Portugal
- Years active: 1937–1986
- Spouse: Aune Häme

Veikko Oskari Ville Salminen (2 October 1908, Mariehamn – 28 November 1992, Quarteira) was a Finnish film actor, director, writer and producer.

== Personal Life and Career ==
He was the father of comedic actor Ville-Veikko Salminen and cinematographer Timo Salminen. Salminen was also a painter and drew complete storyboards of his films before he began shooting.

Salminen's film Kaks' tavallista Lahtista was nominated for the Golden Bear at the 1960 Berlin International Film Festival.

== Filmography ==
=== Director ===
- Kipparikvartetti (1952)
- Lumikki ja 7 jätkää (1953)
- Pekka Puupää (1953)
- Säkkijärven polkka (1956)
- Evakko (1956)
- Kaks' tavallista Lahtista (1960)

=== Actor ===
- Aktivistit (1939)
- The Dead Man Loses His Temper (1944)
- Herra ja ylhäisyys (1944)
- Cross of Love (1946)
- Kalle-Kustaa Korkin seikkailut (1949)
- Laivan kannella (1954)
- Wonderman (1979)
