= Siiri Angerkoski =

Finnish actress (1902–1971)

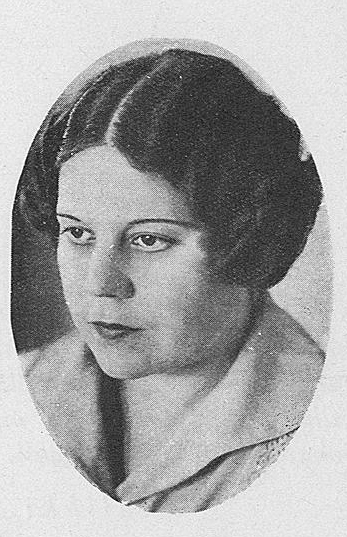
- Born: 21 August 1902; Oulu, Finland
- Died: 28 March 1971 (aged 68); Helsinki, Finland

Siiri Saimi Angerkoski (born Pelkonen, later Palmu; 21 August 1902 – 28 March 1971) was a Finnish actress who had a long career on stage, but is especially known for her film roles. With 98 credits, she has done more roles in Finnish films than any other actor or actress. Her best known comedic role is Justiina Puupää in Pekka and Pätkä films, but she won her two Jussi Awards for dramatic roles in Anna Liisa (1945) and Aliisa (1971), the latter posthumously.

== Personal life ==
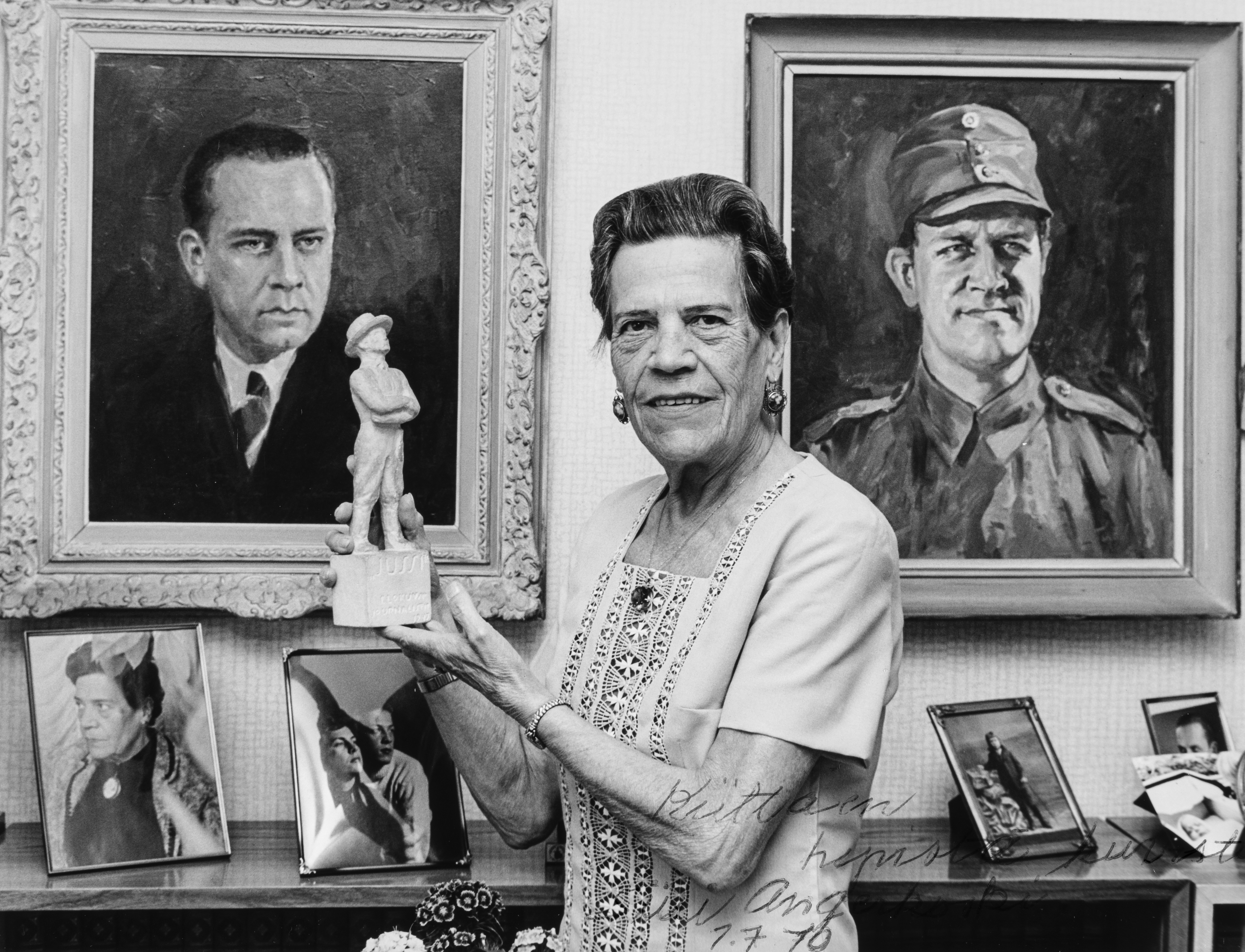
Siiri Angerkoski in 1970

Angerkoski was married to actor Kaarlo Angerkoski (1906–1939) from 1933 until his death. They had one daughter.

== Selected filmography ==
- Kaikki rakastavat (1935)
- Suomisen perhe (1941)
- Uuteen elämään (1942)
- Sylvi (1944)
- Vain sinulle (1945)
- Anna Liisa (1945)
- Onnen-Pekka (1948)
- Professori Masa (1950)
- Rovaniemen markkinoilla (1951)
- We're Coming Back (1953)
- Pekka Puupää (1953)
- Pekka Puupää kesälaitumilla (1953)
- Pekka ja Pätkä puistotäteinä (1955)
- Kankkulan kaivolla (1960)
- Kesyttömät veljekset (1969)
