= Pekka Puupää =

Fictional character

Pekka (on the right) has won 5,000 marks in the lottery and offers Pätkä a free ride on the tram.

Pekka Puupää is a Finnish text comic and film character, created by Ola "Fogeli" Fogelberg. The character appeared 1925–1975 in the popular comic Pekka Puupää and 1952–1960 in thirteen films (Pekka ja Pätkä) produced by Suomen Filmiteollisuus. Pekka Puupää is one of the most well-known and beloved characters in the Finnish popular culture.

Esa Pakarinen (1911–1989) was best known for his role as Pekka Puupää. Other Pekka Puupää actors were Mauri Kuosmanen (1945–2008) and Esko Roine (born 1944).

== Characters ==
Pekka Puupää is a kind but simple and somewhat foolish man. Other characters are his battleaxe wife Justiina and his subtle friend Pätkä (lit. Stub), which Fogeli had picked from his earlier comic, Herra Pätkä. Minor characters include Pätkä's wife Mrs. Pätkä, Pekka's adopted son Otto ( Ottopoika = Finnish : adopted son ), and sometimes a baby called Pulu.

His last name "Puupää" is a common insult denoting low intelligence, literally meaning wood-head and roughly equivalent to the expression "block head".

== Themes ==
Conventional plot subjects are Pekka's failed attempts in various professions and housework, his eccentric solutions to problems he faces in the normal life and other mishaps he encounters due to his foolishness and benevolence. Another constant subject are Pekka's and Pätkä's attempts to run away from their wives to play at cards and have fun.

== History ==
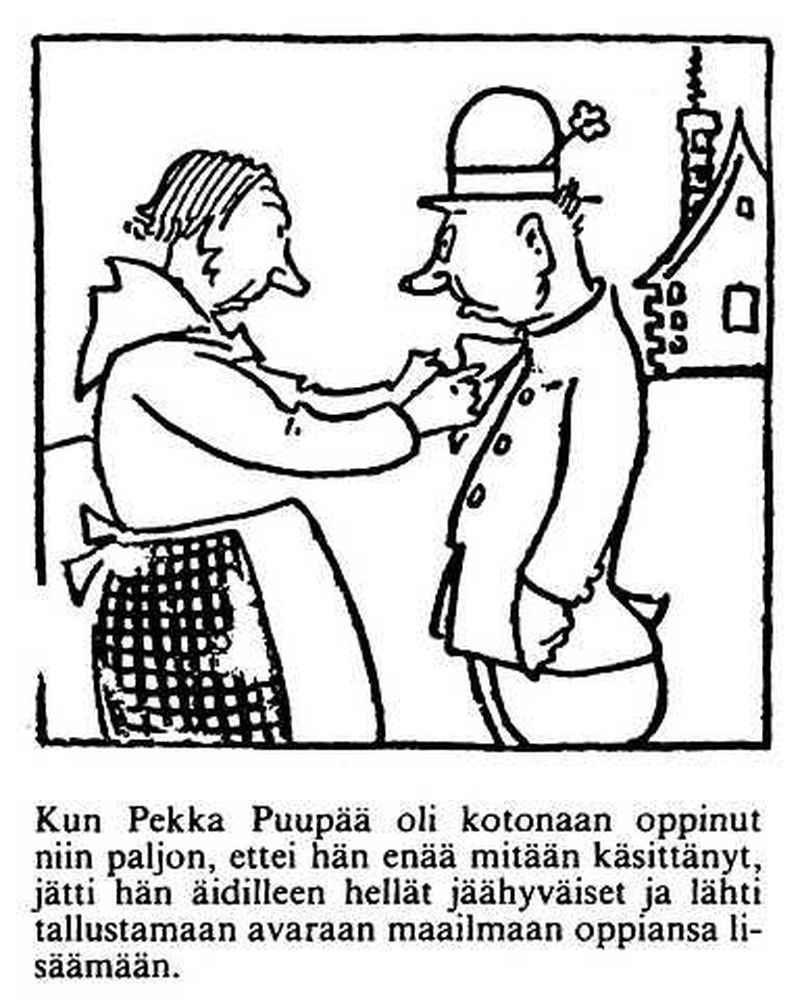
Pekka Puupää's first appearance (with his mother) in the comic strip in 1925.

The first appearance of Pekka Puupää was in the Elanto cooperative's magazine Kuluttaja on 1 May 1925, when it started to publish a comic of the same name. The series was drawn by graphic designer Ola Fogelberg, who signed his comics using the pseudonym Fogeli.

During its first years Pekka Puupää was mainly humorously depicted propaganda for the Elanto cooperative: Pekka was beaten up by Justiina, because he wouldn't go to the cooperative store during rain but visited a private store instead. Later Fogeli quit advertising, though, and changed Pekka Puupää into a conventional joke series, at the same time moving the scene from Helsinki to a small rural locality Savikylä. This let the comic develop into a more diverse one.

The weekly comic was composed of six-panel strips. It didn't have any speech balloons, but instead the texts were under the panels, making it a text comic this was common practice in European comics even after World War II. Apparently Fogelberg drew some strips with balloons as an experiment, but these remained single cases. The drawing style was at the same time caricaturing and realistic: Pekka Puupää and other characters were caricatures, but the settings were realistically and often very carefully drawn, offering a peephole into the early 20th century Finnish rural life.

Pekka Puupää wasn't the first Finnish comic series, but it was the first significant one and at the same time a pioneer. In the 1930s, albums composed of the newspaper strips sold more than any other Finnish literature. After Ola Fogelberg's death in 1952 his daughter, Toto Fogelberg-Kaila, continued the comic until 1975.

== The Puupää Hat award ==
The Finnish Comics Society started to award distinguished comic artists with the Puupää hat (Puupäähattu), which is a copy of Pekka Puupää's oblong hat. The first hat was awarded in 1972 to Toto Fogelberg-Kaila. See fi:Puupäähattu for the list of the awardees.

== See also ==
- Pekka and Pätkä, a line of movies based on Fogeli's characters
  - Pekka Puupää, the first film from 1953 directed by Ville Salminen
