= Toivo Särkkä =

Finnish film producer and director (1890–1975)

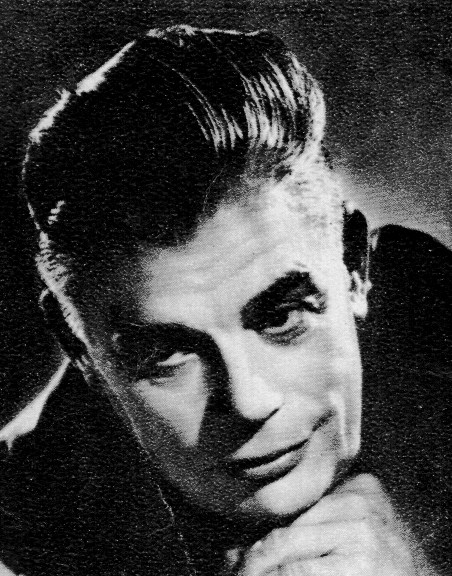
T.J. Särkkä

Toivo Jalmari Särkkä (20 November 1890, in Mikkeli – 9 February 1975, in Helsinki), born Toivo Hjalmar Silén, was a Finnish film producer and director. He was CEO of the production company Suomen Filmiteollisuus.

== Biography ==
Before his career in filmmaking, Särkkä worked as a bank manager and chairman in Kotimainen Työ, an organization promoting Finnish work and products. After the death of Erkki Karu, founder and owner of Suomen Filmiteollisuus, Särkkä became the CEO thus producing 233 and directing 49 feature films.

In 1965, when the Finnish film industry was in difficulties due to the coming of television, Särkkä initiated bankruptcy of Suomen Filmiteollisuus. Films directed by Särkkä are e.g. Suomisen perhe, Helmikuun manifesti, Kulkurin valssi and Vaivaisukon morsian.

Särkkä married Russian-Lithuanian Margariitta Beljavsky in 1914. They had one daughter.

== Selected filmography ==
- Woman is the Wild Card (1944)
- Radio tekee murron (1951)
- Kvinnan bakom allt (1951)
- Rovaniemen markkinoilla (1951)
- Pekka Puupää (1953)
- Pekka Puupää kesälaitumilla (1953)
- The Milkmaid (1953)
- Pekka ja Pätkä lumimiehen jäljillä (1954)
- Hilma's Name Day (1954)
- Pekka ja Pätkä puistotäteinä (1955)
- Kiinni on ja pysyy (1955)
- The Unknown Soldier (1955)
- Juha (1956)
- 1918 (1957)
- Miriam (1957)
- Sven Tuuva the Hero (1958)
- Skandaali tyttökoulussa (1960)
- Komisario Palmun erehdys (1960)
- Kaks' tavallista Lahtista (1960)
- The Scarlet Dove (1961)
