= Reino Helismaa =

Finnish singer-songwriter, film actor and screenwriter

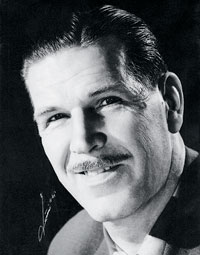
Reino Helismaa

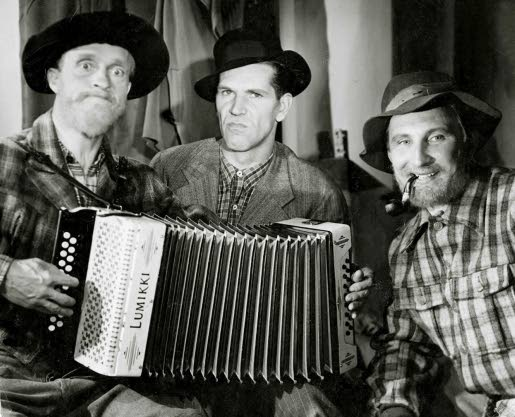
Esa Pakarinen (left) and Helismaa (centre) and Jorma Ikävalko (right)

Reino Vihtori "Repe" Helismaa (12 July 1913 – 21 January 1965) was a Finnish singer-songwriter, musician and scriptwriter. Born in Helsinki, he was mainly known for his humorous, yet homely songs. One of his best-known interpreters was Tapio Rautavaara. He also scripted the comic strip Maan mies Marsissa, drawn by Ami Hauhio.

== Works ==
Song lyrics: Helismaa wrote over five thousand song lyrics. Some of the most famous include:

- Balladi Villistä Lännestä (A ballad of the Wild West)
- Daiga-daiga-duu (Diga-diga-doo)
- Hiljainen kylätie (A quiet village street)
- Kaksi vanhaa tukkijätkää (Two old lumberjacks)
- Kulkuri ja joutsen (The tramp and the swan; translation of originally Swedish song Vagabonden och svanen by Lasse Dahlquist)
- Kulkurin iltatähti (The tramp's evening star)
- Lentävä kalakukko (The flying kalakukko)
- Meksikon pikajuna (The Mexico Express, original: Orient Express)
- Päivänsäde ja menninkäinen (The sunbeam and the goblin)
- Rakovalkealla (At the campfire)
- Reppu ja reissumies (The knapsack and the travelling man)
- Rovaniemen markkinoilla (At the Rovaniemi fair)
- Suutarin tyttären pihalla (At the shoemaker's daughter's yard)

Other works by Helismaa include 8 plays, 10 revues, 32 film manuscripts and 104 radio plays.

- Screenplays for several Pekka ja Pätkä -comedy films made in the 1950s.
