= Toivo Kärki =

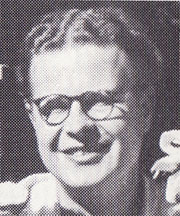

Background information
- Birth name: Toivo Pietari Johannes Kärki
- Born: 3 December 1915; Pirkkala, Grand Duchy of Finland
- Origin: Finland
- Died: 30 April 1992 (aged 76); Helsinki, Finland
- Occupation: Composer

Toivo Pietari Johannes Kärki (Finnish pronunciation: [ˈtoi̯ʋo ˈkærki]; 3 December 1915 – 30 April 1992) was a Finnish composer, musician, music producer and arranger. He is especially remembered for his collaboration with Reino Helismaa.

Kärki composed approximately 1400 recorded compositions, many of which had several versions, and wrote hundreds of unrecorded songs. He composed the music for about 50 films, several revues, theatrical plays, and radio comedies. He also arranged a large number of songs written by other people. He trained several of Finland's most important popular music lyricists. During his career, he helped dozens of singers get started in the industry, many of which remain active to this day.

He made himself an important name in Finnish tango.

He is buried in the Hietaniemi Cemetery in Helsinki.
