= Suomen Filmiteollisuus =

Finnish film production company

- Industry: Film production
- Founded: 1933; 92 years ago
- Founder: Erkki Karu
- Key people: T.J. Särkkä; Armand Lohikoski
- Website: suomenfilmiteollisuus.fi

Suomen Filmiteollisuus (SF), lit. Finland's Film Industry, is a Finnish film production company founded by Erkki Karu in 1933 after financial problems with Suomi-Filmi. The CEO, director, producer and writer T.J. Särkkä was a central figure in Suomen Filmiteollisuus. Among others, the film director Armand Lohikoski worked for the company, for which he directed 18 feature films. Suomen Filmiteollisuus went bankrupt in 1965 as a result of the coming of television.

Since 2005, the company name Suomen Filmiteollisuus has been owned by film director Markku Pölönen and his wife, who bought it from director Jari Nieminen.
