= List of Finnish films of 1917–39 =

A list of films produced in Finland ordered by year of release. For an alphabetical list of Finnish films see Category:Finnish films

The numbers in the Notes column refer to the numbering used by Suomen kansallisfilmografia. These numbers are given to all full-length films which have been shown in public theaters as a headlining or co-headlining film. Suomen kansallisfilmografia uses the minimum length of 37 minutes to qualify for a film to be listed, however the earliest films may be shorter than this (as 37 minutes was not even technically possible).

| Title | Director | Cast | Genre | Notes |
|---|---|---|---|---|
1917 No known Finnish films produced this year.
1918 No known Finnish films produced this year.
1919
| Kuvia Suomen vapaussodasta | ? | | Documentary | 1919/1 All copies of the Finnish version believed to be destroyed, film footage survived in the Swedish (presumably slightly different) version |
| Bolshevismin ikeen alla | G. Krol | Lyubov Yegorova, Raisa Lork | War, Drama | 1919/2 All copies believed to be destroyed |
| Venusta etsimässä | Konrad Tallroth | Aleko Lilius, Helmi Lindelöf, Mimmi Lähteenoja, Edvin Ingberg | Romance | 1919/3 All copies believed to be destroyed |
1920
| Ylioppilas Pöllövaaran kihlaus | Erkki Karu | Väinö Lehmus, Elli Karu, Martti Tuukka | Romantic comedy | 1920/1 All copies believed to be destroyed, few film fragments survived |
| Sotagulashi Kaiun häiritty kesäloma | Erkki Karu | Väinö Lehmus, Erkki Karu, Martti Tuukka, Elli Karu | Romantic comedy | 1920/2 All copies believed to be destroyed, few film fragments survived |
| Kihlaus | Oski Talvio | ? | Drama | 1920/3 All copies believed to be destroyed |
| Kilu-Kallen ja Mouku-Franssin kosioretki | Hjalmar V. Pohjanheimo | Väinö Lehmus, Lenni Jurva, Onni Veijonen, Saima Lehmus | Crime | 1920/4 All copies believed to be destroyed |
| Ollin oppivuodet | Teuvo Puro | Jussi Snellman, Ertta Virtamo, Sirkka Puro, Alfred Idström | Drama | 1920/5 |
1921
| Kun solttu-Juusosta tuli herra | Hjalmar V. Pohjanheimo | Väinö Lehmus, Saima Lehmus, Hildur Lehmus, Onni Veijonen | Comedy | 1921/1 All copies believed to be destroyed |
| Häidenvietto Karjalan runomailla (Wedding in poetic Karjala) | A.O. Väisänen | Lyyli Home, Olga Tarpio, Iivana Bomba, Vaslei Rötshä | Fictional documentary | 1921/2 |
| Sunnuntaimetsästäjät | Hjalmar V. Pohjanheimo | Väinö Lehmus, Matti Jurva, Saima Lehmus, Birger Pohjanheimo | Romantic comedy | 1921/3 All copies believed to be destroyed |
| Se parhaiten nauraa, joka viimeksi nauraa | Teuvo Puro | Emil Autere, Jussi Snellman, Hemmo Kallio, Ruth Snellman | Romantic comedy | 1921/4 Copies with original editing believed to be lost |
| Sotapolulla | Teuvo Pakkala | Yrjö Hirviseppä, Lisi Carén, Jorma Vaajakallio, Solveig Wohlström | War, Romance | 1921/5 |
1922
| Kihlaus | Teuvo Puro | Iisakki Lattu, Martti Tuukka, Annie Mörk, Uuno Kantanen | Drama | 1922/1 Copies with original editing believed to be lost |
| Anna-Liisa | Teuvo Puro, Jussi Snellman | Hemmo Kallio, Meri Roini, Helmi Lindelöf, Greta Waahtera | Drama | 1922/2 First Finnish film to get "restricted" (unsuitable for children) rating |
| Finlandia (film) | Erkki Karu, Eero Leväluoma | | Propaganda, Documentary | 1922/3 Produced for the Ministry for Foreign Affairs, was shown globally to promote independent Finland and its culture |
| Rakkauden kaikkivalta | Konrad Tallroth | Ida Brander, Konrad Tallroth, John Precht, Sara Järnefelt | Drama | 1922/4 |
1923
| Koskenlaskijan morsian | Erkki Karu | Konrad Tallroth, Heidi Korhonen, Jaakko Korhonen, Einar Rinne | Drama | 1923/1 |
| Rautakylän vanha parooni | Carl Fager | Adolf Lindfors, Felix Borg, Einar Rinne, Naimi Kari | Drama | 1923/2 |
| Nummisuutarit (translation: The Village Shoemakers) | Erkki Karu | Axel Slangus, Heidi Korhonen, Kirsti Suonio, Alarik Korhonen | Comedy, Drama | 1923/3 |
| Kun isällä on hammassärky | Erkki Karu | Aku Käyhkö, Naimi Kari, Eino Jurkka, Martti Tuukka | Comedy | 1923/4 |
1924
| Suursalon häät | Konrad Tallroth | Oiva Soini, Heidi Blåfield-Korhonen, Katri Rautio, Edvin Stenström | Drama | 1924/1 |
| Polyteekkarifilmi | herra Lindroos | Rurik Ekroos, Emil Lindh, Kirsti Suonio, Edda von Bidder-Ehrnrooth | Fantasy | 1924/2 |
| Myrskyluodon kalastaja (The Price They Pay) | Erkki Karu | Wilho Ilmari, Wilhelmiina Tuukkanen, Emil Lindh, Agnes Lindh | Crime | 1924/3 The end of the film is believed to be destroyed |
| "Kihlauskylpylä" | Yrjö Nyberg | John Nykänen, Litja Ilmari, Siska Sainio, Terttu Sario | Comedy | 1924/4 All copies believed to be destroyed, few film fragments survived |
1925
| Suvinen satu | Erkki Karu | Volmar Neiro, Maire Heide, Sven Hildén, Paavo Costiander | Comedy | 1925/1 |
| Suomen presidentin Lauri Relanderin vierailu Virossa v. 1925 | ? | | Documentary | 1925/2 |
| Ruotsin kuningas Suomessa | ? | | Documentary | 1925/3 All copies believed to be destroyed |
| Ruotsin kuningasparin vierailu | ? | | Documentary | 1925/4 Copies with original editing believed to be lost |
| Pohjalaisia | Jalmari Lahdensuo | Simo Saario, Oiva Soini, Kaisa Leppänen, Einar Rinne | Crime | 1925/5 |
1926
| Salpausselän hiihto 4-7,2, 1926 | ? | | Documentary | 1926/1 |
| Suomen suojeluskuntajärjestö | ? | | Documentary | 1926/2 |
| Kyllä kaikki selviää | Oscar Tengström | Birgit Sergelius, Favo Walters, Otto Westphal, Leo Golowin | Comedy | 1926/3 All copies believed to be destroyed |
| Murtovarkaus | Harry Roeck Hansen | Emil Lindh, Joel Rinne, Kaarlo Saarnio, Agnes Lindh | Crime | 1926/4 |
| Meren kasvojen edessä | Teuvo Puro | Kaarlo Kytö, Urho Seppälä, Ilmari Unho, Waldemar Wohlström | Drama | 1926/5 |
| Meren ja lemmen aallot | Uuno Hirvonen | Annie Mörk, Ellen Sylvin, Aku Käyhkö, Elo Kuosmanen | Romantic comedy | 1926/6 All copies believed to be destroyed in warehouse fire in 1959 |
1927
| Muurmannin pakolaiset | Erkki Karu | Gunnar Brygge, Berndt Lindahl, Sulo Räikkönen, Heikki Välisalmi | War, Drama | 1927/1 |
| Noidan kirot (translation: Curse of the Witch) | Teuvo Puro | Einar Rinne, Heidi Blåfield-Korhonen, Irmeli Viherjuuri, Kaisa Leppänen | Finland's first Horror film | 1927/2 |
| Ei auta itku markkinoilla | Uuno Eskola | Helge Ranin, Rakel Tarpila, Kalle Kaarna, Eero Leväluoma | Drama | 1927/3 All copies believed to be destroyed in warehouse fire in 1959 |
| Vaihdokas | Teuvo Puro | Helmi Lindelöf, Sven Relander, Hilja Jorma, Ilmari Unho | Drama | 1927/4 |
| Runoilija muuttaa | Erkki Karu | Heikki Välisalmi, Ossi Korhonen, Uuno Laakso, Glory Renvall-Leppänen | Comedy | 1927/5 |
| Villilintujen parissa | Heikki Aho, Björn Soldan | | Documentary | 1927/6 Parts of the film survived, but not the entire film |
| Elämän maantiellä | Kurt Jäger, Ragnar Hartwall | Waldemar Wohlström, Eric H. Broman, Lia Lae, Halvar Lindholm | Drama | 1927/7 |
1928
| Nuori luotsi | Erkki Karu | Lillan Järnefelt, Joel Rinne, Sven Hildén, Paavo Costiander | Romance | 1928/1 |
| Kuningaspäivät Helsingissä toukok. 15-17 p. 1928 | ? | | Documentary | 1928/2 |
| H.M. Norjan kuninkaan Haakon VII vierailu Suomessa | ? | | Documentary | 1928/3 |
| Tukkijoella | Axel Slangus, Wilho Ilmari | Urho Somersalmi, Ellen Sylvin, Mary Spennert-Hannikainen, Litja Ilmari | Drama | 1928/4 |
| Miekan terällä | Kalle Kaarna | Joel Rinne, Eero Leväluoma, Hannes Närhi, Martta Seppälä | War | 1928/5 All copies believed to be destroyed in warehouse fire in 1959 |
1929
| Meidän poikamme | Erkki Karu | Axel Slangus, Helge Ranin, Birgit Sergelius, Waldemar Wohlström | Propaganda,War | Military propaganda film |
| Suomen metsät | Olli Heikinheimo, Torsten Rancken | | Documentary | |
| Mustat silmät | Valentin Vaala | Theodor Tugai, Regina Ekroth, Valentin Vaala, Tuura Sten | Drama | |
| Lumisten metsien mies | Uuno Eskola | Einar Rinne, Anni Hämäläinen, Viljo Hurme, Simo Kaario | Drama | |
| Korkein voitto | Carl von Haartman | Carl von Haartman, Kerstin Nylander, Aku Korhonen | Spy Thriller | |
| Työn sankarilaulu | Kalle Kaarna | Urho Somersalmi, Kaisu Leppänen, Einar Rinne, Eero Leväluoma | Drama | |
| Mustalaishurmaaja | Valentin Vaala | Theodor Tugai, Meri Hackzell, Hanna Taini, Alli Riks | Drama | |
| Juhla meren rannalla | Kalle Kaarna | Urho Somersalmi, Heidi Blåfield, Yrjö Tuominen, Kaarlo Angerkoski | Drama | |
1930
| Kahden tanssin välillä | Waldemar Wohlström | Heikki Välisalmi, Birgit Sergelius, Helge Ranin, Paavo Costiander | Drama | |
| Suomen puu- ja paperiteollisuus | Heikki Aho, Björn Soldan | | Documentary | |
| Kajastus | Carl von Haartman | Aarne Leppänen, Elsa Segerberg, Helge Ranin, Anielka Elter | Drama | |
1931
| Aatamin puvussa ja vähän Eevankin | Jaakko Korhonen | Elsa Segerberg, Joel Rinne, Yrjö Tuominen, Uuno Montonen | Comedy | The first Finnish sound film. |
| Sano se suomeksi | Yrjö Nyberg | Markus Rautio, Ture Ara, Eino Jurkka, Emmi Jurkka | Musical | |
| Laveata tietä | Valentin Vaala | Theodor Tugai, Väinö Kangas, Alli Riks, Eeva Virtanen | Drama | |
| Jääkärin morsian | Kalle Kaarna | Hanna Taini, Tauno Brännäs, Ella Eronen, Toivo Pohjakallio | War | |
| Suomi matkailumaana | ? | | Documentary | |
| Rovastin häämatkat | Jaakko Korhonen | Katri Rautio, Iris Knape, Glory Leppänen, Joel Rinne | Comedy | |
| Erämaan turvissa | Friedrich von Maydell, Kalle Kaarna, Carl von Haartman | Bernhard Goetzke, Elisabeth Frisk, Aarne Leppänen, Hanna Taini | Drama | |
| Tulimaata tutkimassa | ? | | Documentary | Väinö Auer in Tierra del Fuego |
| Tukkipojan morsian | Erkki Karu | Urho Somersalmi, Helena Koskinen, Hemmo Kallio, Aku Käyhkö | Drama | |
1932
1933
| Voi meitä! Anoppi tulee | Erkki Karu | Mia Backman, Uuno Laakso, Georg Malmstén | Comedy | |
1934
1935
1936
| Onnenpotku | Glory Leppänen | Ester Toivonen, Yrjö Tuominen | Comedy | First Finnish film directed by a woman |
| Substitute Wife | Valentin Vaala | Ansa Ikonen, Tauno Palo, Uuno Laakso | Comedy | |
1937
| Kuin uni ja varjo | Yrjö Norta, T.J. Särkkä | Ansa Ikonen, Eino Kaipainen | Drama | IMDb |
| Juha | Nyrki Tapiovaara | Hannes Närhi, Irma Seikkula, Walle Saikko | Drama | |
| The Rapids-Rider's Brides | Valentin Vaala | Jalmari Rinne,Ansa Ikonen, Eino Jurkka | Drama | |
1938
| Laulu tulipunaisesta kukasta (translation: The Song of the Scarlet Flower) | Teuvo Tulio | Kaarlo Oksanen, Rakel Linnanheimo | Drama | IMDb |
| The Stolen Death | Nyrki Tapiovaara | Tuulikki Paananen, Ilmari Mänty, Santeri Karilo | Thriller | |
1939
| Kaksi Vihtoria | Nyrki Tapiovaara | Annie Mörk, Sointu Kouvo, Eino Jurkka | Comedy | |
| Mr. Lahtinen Takes French Leave | Nyrki Tapiovaara | Fritz-Hugo Backman, Märtha Jaatinen, Hertta Leistén | Comedy | |
| Rikas tyttö | Valentin Vaala | Sirkka Sari, Olavi Reimas, Lea Joutseno | Drama | |
| Vihtori ja Klaara | Teuvo Tulio | Eino Jurkka, Verna Piponius | Comedy | |
