= Everyman (Sibelius) =

Incidental music by Jean Sibelius

- Incidental music by Jean Sibelius
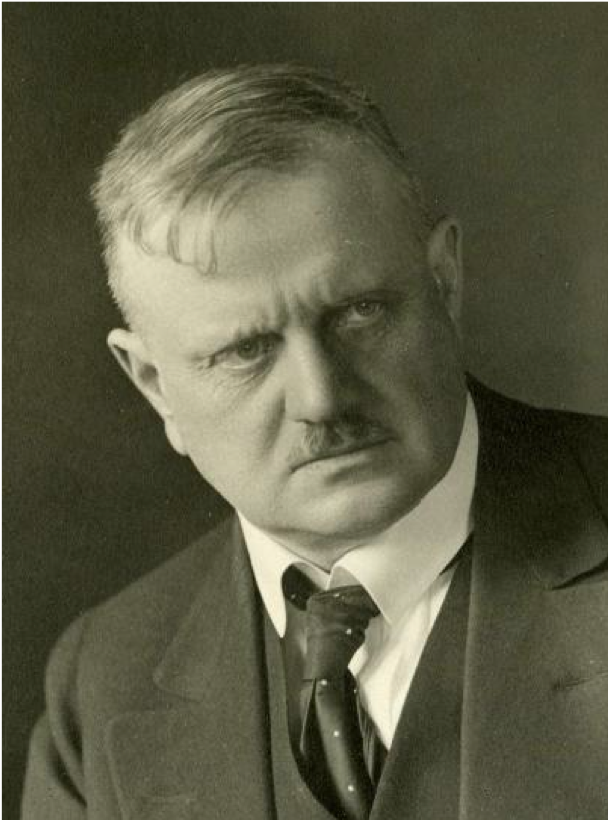
- The composer in 1913
- Native name: Jedermann / Jokamies
- Opus: 83
- Text: Jedermann by Hugo von Hofmannsthal
- Composed: 1916
- Duration: Approx. 40 mins.

Premiere
- Date: 5 November 1916
- Location: Finnish National Theatre; Helsinki, Grand Duchy of Finland
- Conductor: Robert Kajanus
- Performers: Helsinki Philharmonic Orchestra

Everyman (in Finnish: Jokamies; in German: Jedermann), Op. 83, is a theatre score—comprising 16 numbers—for soloists, mixed choir, orchestra, piano, and organ by the Finnish composer Jean Sibelius; he wrote the music in 1916 to accompany a Finnish-language production of the Austrian author Hugo von Hofmannsthal's 1911 play of the same name.

The play premiered on 5 November 1916 at the Finnish National Theatre in Helsinki, with Robert Kajanus conducting the Helsinki Philharmonic Orchestra; the theatre director was Jalmari Lahdensuo.

== History ==
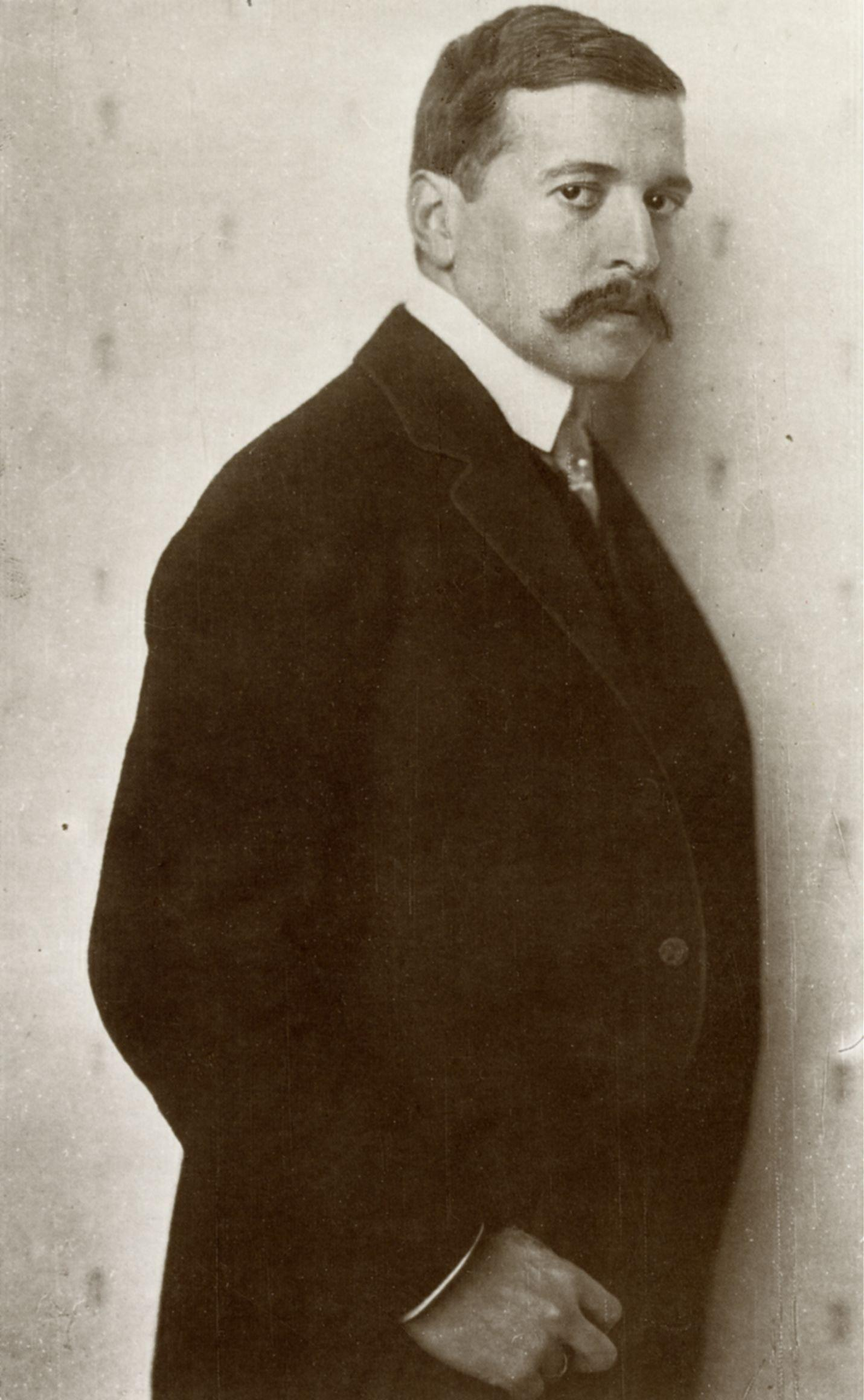
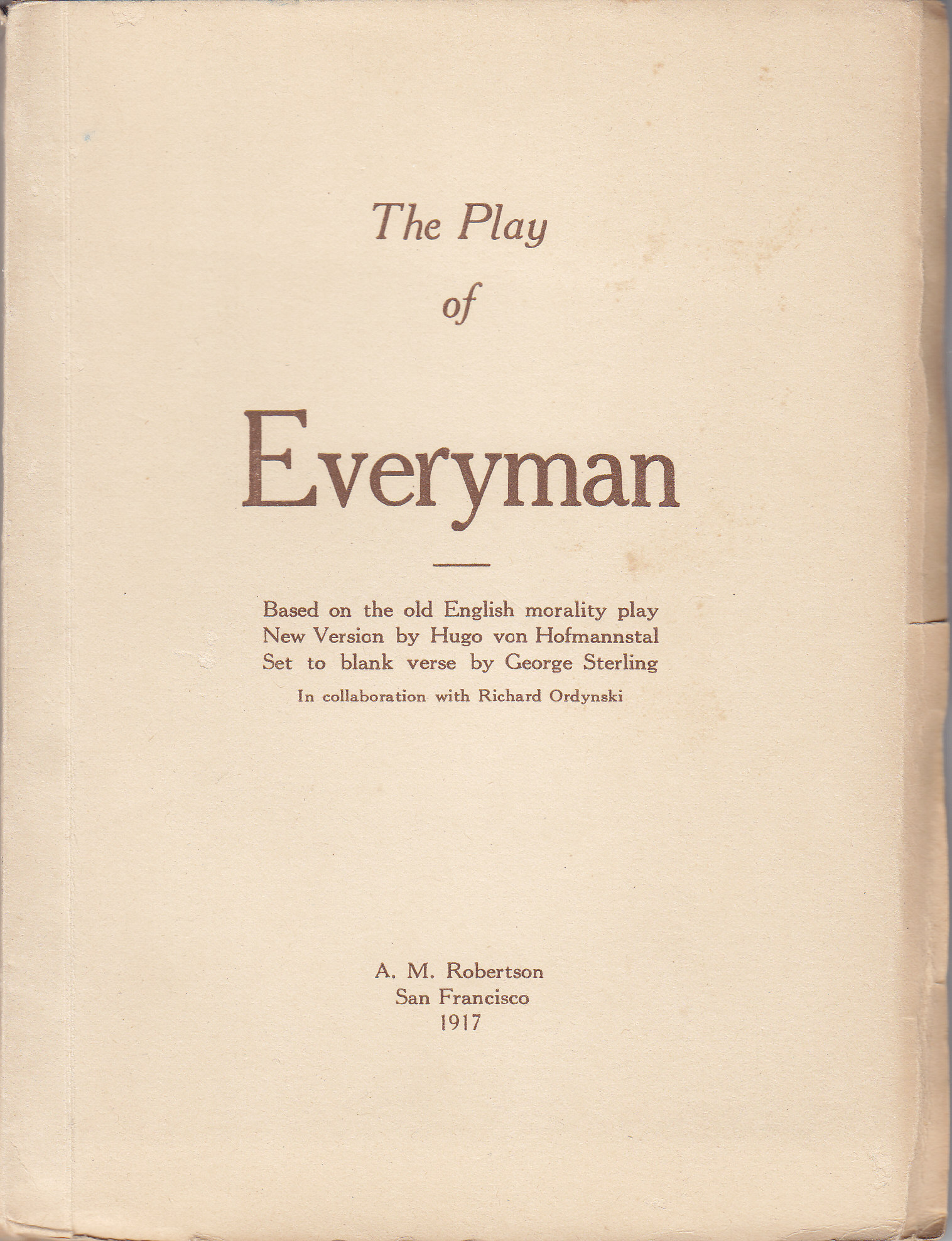
Hugo von Hofmannsthal (left) wrote Jedermann in 1911, the year it was first staged by Max Reinhardt. In 1917, the play was translated into English as Everyman.

=== Composition ===
On 15 May 1916, the theatre director Jalmari Lahdensuo wrote to Sibelius asking if he would like to score the Finnish National Theatre's upcoming Finnish-language production of Jedermann, (Note: Huugo Jalkanen had translated the play into Finnish.) a modern adaptation by the Austrian playwright Hugo von Hofmannsthal of the fifteenth-century English morality play Everyman. Jedermann, which Max Reinhardt had premiered in Berlin on 1 December 1911 at the Zirkus Schumann, had taken Europe by storm, with subsequent productions in Austria, Denmark, and Sweden. By 1916, it was Finland's turn, and competing productions were scheduled in Helsinki for the end of the year. (The other staging was at the Swedish Theatre, with original music by Einar Nilson, (Note: From the 1910s to the early 1930s, one of Reinhardt's most trusted collaborators was the Swedish-born American composer and conductor Einar Nilson, whom he employed as the music department head of his theaters; during international trips, Nilson would also serve as an advance man for Reinhardt, traveling ahead to the next performance location to audition singers and actors. Reinhardt, moreover, often would utilize existing music by famous composers (for example, Mozart and Mendelssohn) for his productions, which Nilson would arrange to meet Reinhardt's needs. Nilson also composed original music, including the score for the 1 December 1911 premiere of Hofmannsthal's Jedermann) as well as Palestrina's motet Sicut cervus.) (Note: The Swedish Theatre's production of Jedermann (to a translation by Emil Hillberg) took place on 31 October 1916, with the Danish actor Adam Poulsen as Everyman, Albert Nycop as Death, Signe Mörne as Good Works, Lisa Håkansson-Taube as Faith, and Adolf Berlin as the Devil. In addition, Hans Aufrichtig conducted the Helsinki Philharmonic Orchestra and a 40-person choir, Maggie Gripenberg provided the choreography for the banquet scene, and Peder Knudsen designed the sets.) Sibelius accepted the commission in mid-June, likely—as the musicologist Daniel Grimley has argued—simulated by the play's "images of devotion, sacrifice, pilgrimage, and sacred mission":

The essence of Everyman lies in its emphasis on transformation, both bodily and spiritual ... It was this idea of mutability, and of the transience of mortal life, that attracted Hofmannsthal. Sibelius shared [this] acute feeling for a world in transition, of the essentially melancholic, nostalgic experience of passing time and human loss ... Both [men] were concerned with the impression of modernism and modernity as one of slippage ...

Sibelius began working on the score on 10 July, although by the next day he already was confiding in his diary doubts about the project. By 13 July, he had broken off work on the project to attend to more pressing matters: the impending marriage of his daughter Ruth to Jussi Snellman (both were stage actors at the National Theatre) on 21 July. (Note: Sibelius's daughter, the actress Ruth Snellman, was a member of the original cast, portraying one of the young ladies at the banquet. She had married the Finnish actor Jussi Snellman (Prologue in the production) earlier in 1916. For the 1935 revival, Ruth played the Paramour.) Sibelius considered it his responsibility to marry off his daughters "in style ... all this cost money". To address his finances, he "worked like a blacksmith" to compose a handful of piano pieces for the Helsinki-based music publisher R. E. Westerlund.

=== Premiere ===
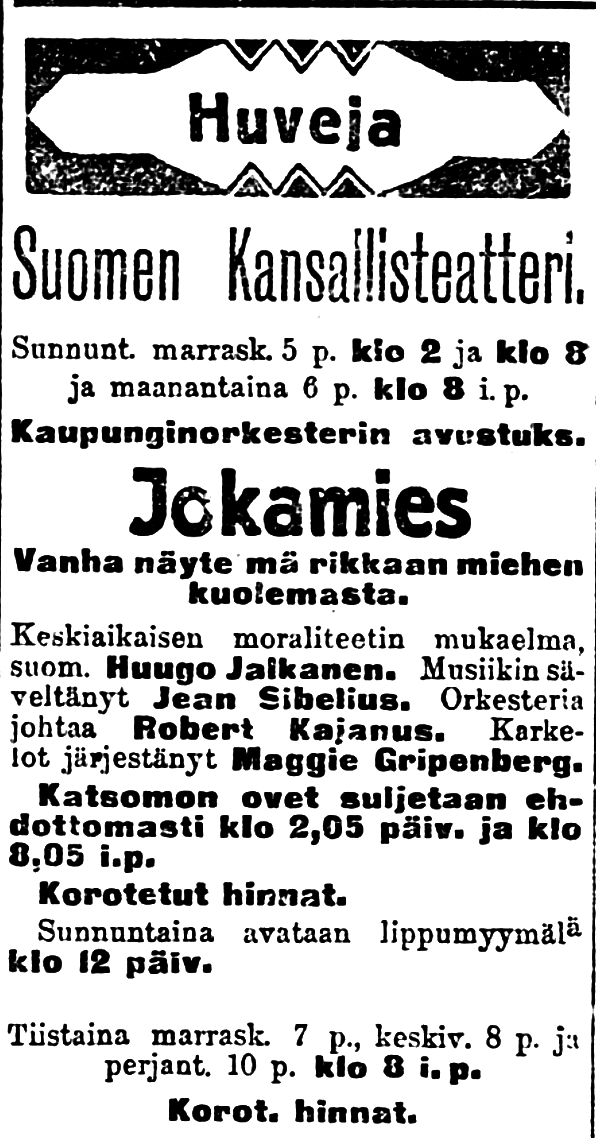
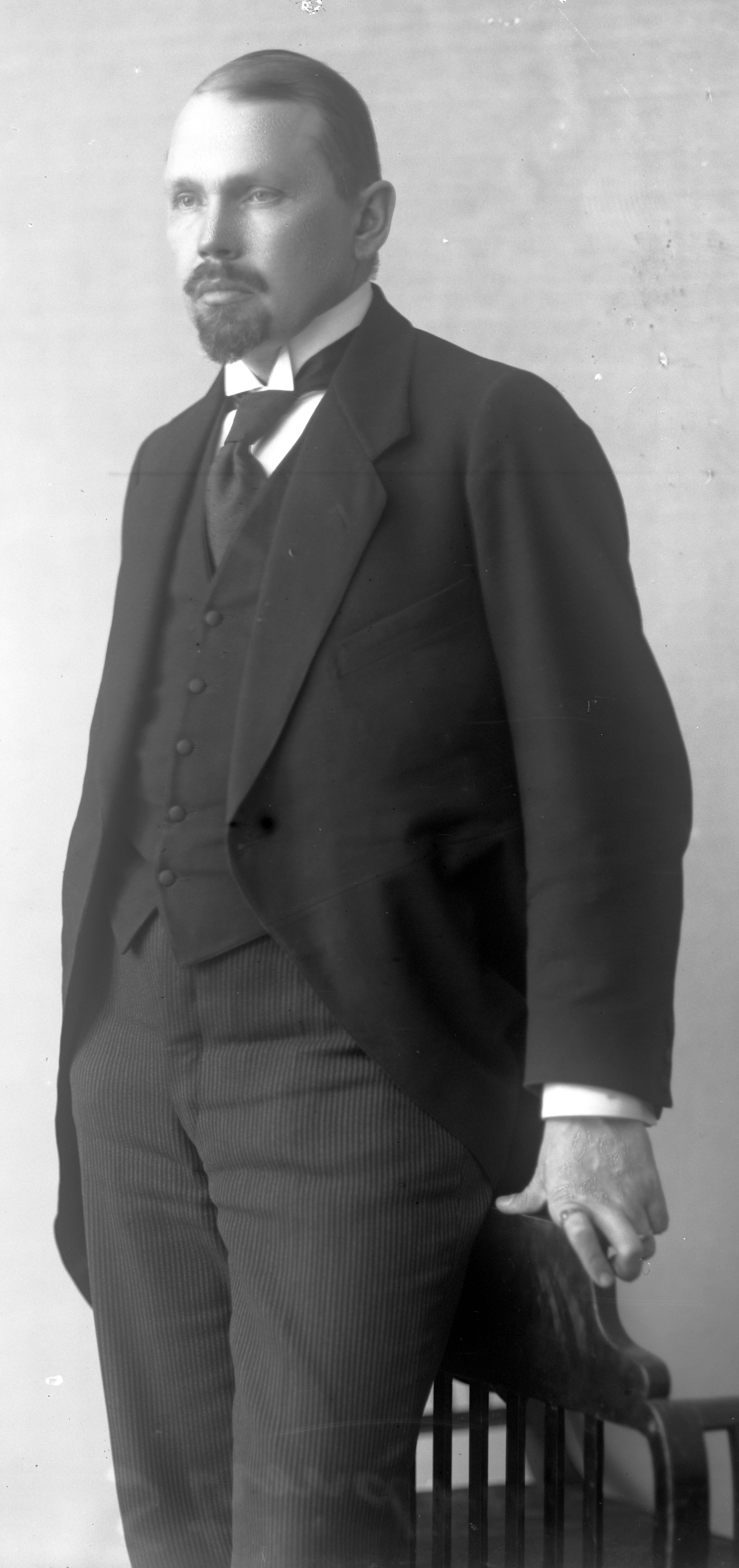
Jalmari Lahdensuo (right) directed the first Finnish-language production of Hofmannsthal's Jedermann and commissioned Sibelius to write the incidental music.

On 5 November 1916, the National Theatre's Jedermann premiered at a 2:00 matinée, with a second performance at 8:00 that night. Robert Kajanus conducted the Helsinki Philharmonic Orchestra, while Maggie Gripenberg choreographed the dances for the banquet scene (her pupils were the dancers). In the main roles were Urho Somersalmi (Everyman), Eero Kilpi (Death), Hilda Pihlajamäki (Good Works), Helmi Lindelöf (Faith), and Teuvo Puro (the Devil). Lahdensuo, who had seen Jedermann in Dresden and had modeled that production's scenography, opted for "as indifferent a background for the action as possible": the front curtain was gone, such that—from the moment they entered the auditorium—audience members could view the stage. This extended over the orchestra pit in order to create a more intimate connection with the audience and was covered in black material, such that the musicians were not visible; the ceiling, too, was draped in black, and black curtains stretched behind the stage's six large, white-gray columns. All set decorations were omitted, with the exception of a tombstone placed over the hatch (the banquet table and Good Work's bed later rose from the floor). The set design "created a darkly festive, oppressive mood". (Indeed, the concert had been postponed by two days, because its original date of 3 November was the anniversary of Nicholas II's accession to the Russian throne, and according to the tsarist authorities, the funereal scenery was incongruous with the national day of celebration.)

Writing in Helsingin Sanomat, the theatre critic Erkki Kivijärvi posited that even though Sibelius's "magnificently generous and wonderfully lucid music" had been the production's "most powerful mood-maker", Hofmannsthal's play remained for the audience merely an "artistic and literary-historical curiosity", its moral comprehensible yet anachronistic:

[It is] the same aesthetic pleasure as the spiritual pictorial art of past centuries, the reverential beauty of which arouses in us a wistfulness, but fails to make us feel the religious devotion in which it was created ... Audience members felt ... [as if] they had been present at a strange occasion, that they had wandered for a moment into a sanctuary that the feverish pulse of life's everyday hustle and bustle could not penetrate ... Nevertheless, [the play] does not have the power to melt the minds of modern people.

For the same newspaper, the composer Leevi Madetoja (Sibelius's one-time pupil) described the score as "a great artistic achievement ... that enhanced the atmosphere of this old play, the moral of which would have been very weak absent [Sibelius's music]". After complimenting the beauty of two songs (Nos. IV and IX), Madetoja praised the "masterly skill" with which Sibelius had captured "vividly" the purification of Everyman's soul: "the organ joins the orchestra, and soon we feel as if under the vaults of a Catholic church. In Uusi Suometar, the theatre critic Viljo Tarkiainen agreed that Sibelius's music had elevated the production, especially the concluding scenes.

=== Early revivals ===
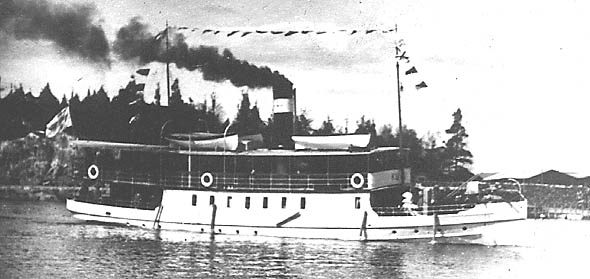
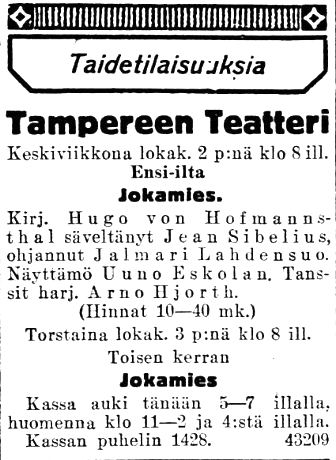
After the sinking of the SS Kuru (top) on 7 September 1929 led to 136 fatalities, the Tampere Theatre performed Jedermann in memoriam (arranged by Hans Aufrichtig).

In April 1925, the Berlin-based music publisher Robert Lienau, with whom Sibelius had contracted from 1904 to 1910, (Note: Major works Lienau published include: the Violin Concerto, Pelléas et Mélisande, Pohjola's Daughter, the Third Symphony, Nightride and Sunrise, Belshazzar's Feast, and Voces intimae. The arrival of the First World War, however, made business with Germany difficult; Sibelius's response was to sell his works to Wilhelm Hansen in Copenhagen.) wrote asking the composer for a short orchestral work similar in style to the concert suites for Pelléas et Mélisande (1905) or Belshazzar's Feast (1906). Sibelius replied that he could make a suite of Jedermann ("From this music I could put together a good suite. I shall write to you about it next season".) Although Lienau agreed enthusiastically, Sibelius abandoned the idea for unknown reasons. The Sibelius biographer Andrew Barnett speculates that Sibelius may have lost interest in reworking Jedermann upon receiving in May a commission from the Royal Danish Theatre in Copenhagen to compose incidental music to Shakespeare's The Tempest. Nevertheless, Sibelius produced three pieces for solo piano from No. II (Episodio. Largo), No. IV (Scena. Allegretto—Moderato), and Nos. VII–IX (Canzone. Andantino), "presumably as an offshoot" of his work for Lienau. (Note: The three pieces from Jedermann for solo piano received their world premiere studio recording by the Finnish pianist Folke Gräsbeck, who between 2007 and 2009 recorded numerous pieces of Sibelius's piano works for Vol. X (Piano Music II) of the BIS Sibelius Edition. Together, the three Jedermann pieces take about six minutes to perform.)

While Sibelius never made Jedermann suitable for the concert hall, a revival of play by Lahdensuo in late 1929 again brought the music to Finnish audiences, albeit outside of the capital. On 7 September, the SS Kuru sank during a storm on Lake Näsijärvi, a tragedy that caused the deaths of 136 people aboard the steamship; as a result, Tampere's Jedermann would serve as a memorial tribute to the deceased. The production was organized in some haste (rehearsals were a mere two weeks), and because the city did not have large orchestral forces at its disposal, the conductor Hans Aufrichtig—at Sibelius's request—arranged the score for smaller forces. (Note: The Tampere Philharmonic Orchestra was founded in 1930.) The next year, Lahdensuo staged Jedermann in Turku, with Tauno Hannikainen conducting the Turku Philharmonic Orchestra.

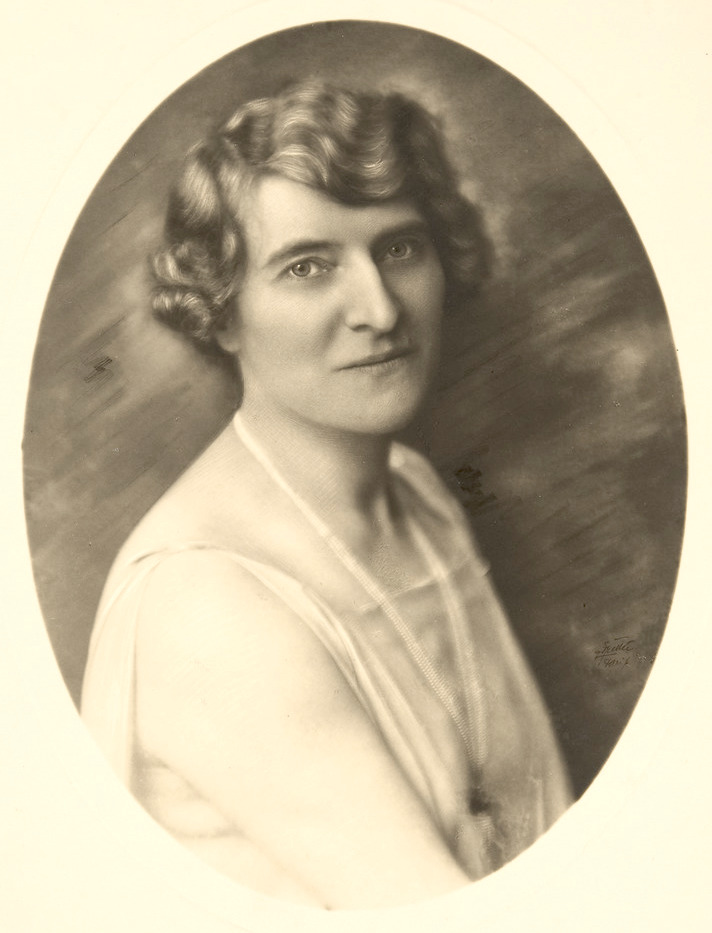
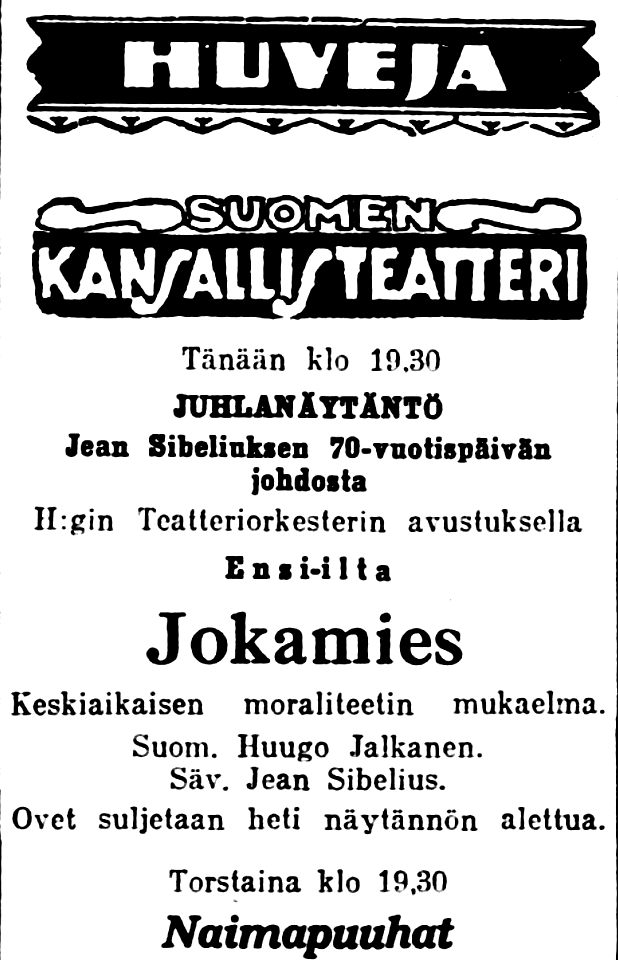
Glory Leppänen (left) directed the Finnish National Theatre's 1935 revival of Jedermann, which also used Sibelius's music.

On 11 December 1935, the National Theatre revived Jedermann in honor of Sibelius's seventieth birthday. (By then, the composer had unofficially retired, although the music world breathlessly awaited his reportedly-in-progress Eighth Symphony; his last major work had been 1926's tone poem Tapiola). The production was directed by Glory Leppänen, who had recently studied at the Max Reinhardt Seminar in Vienna from 1933 to 1934; according to Leppänen, Sibelius instructed before the performance "that 'the music must follow every beat of the text, because the note-lengths reflect the words themselves. No deviation from this should be allowed. The delivery of the text should be made to suit the music; this [is] not negotiable'". Moreover, he also expressed his wish that the audience not applaud during or after the performance, so as "'not to destroy the solemn atmosphere'". His son-in-law Jussi Blomstedt (later Jalas) conducted the Theatre Orchestra. The title role again went to Urho Somersalmi, while Teuvo Puro portrayed Death, Liisa Pakarinen Good Works, Kyllikki Väre Faith, and Uuno Laakso the Devil; Sibelius's daughter Ruth Snellman was cast as the Paramour.

== Structure and roles ==
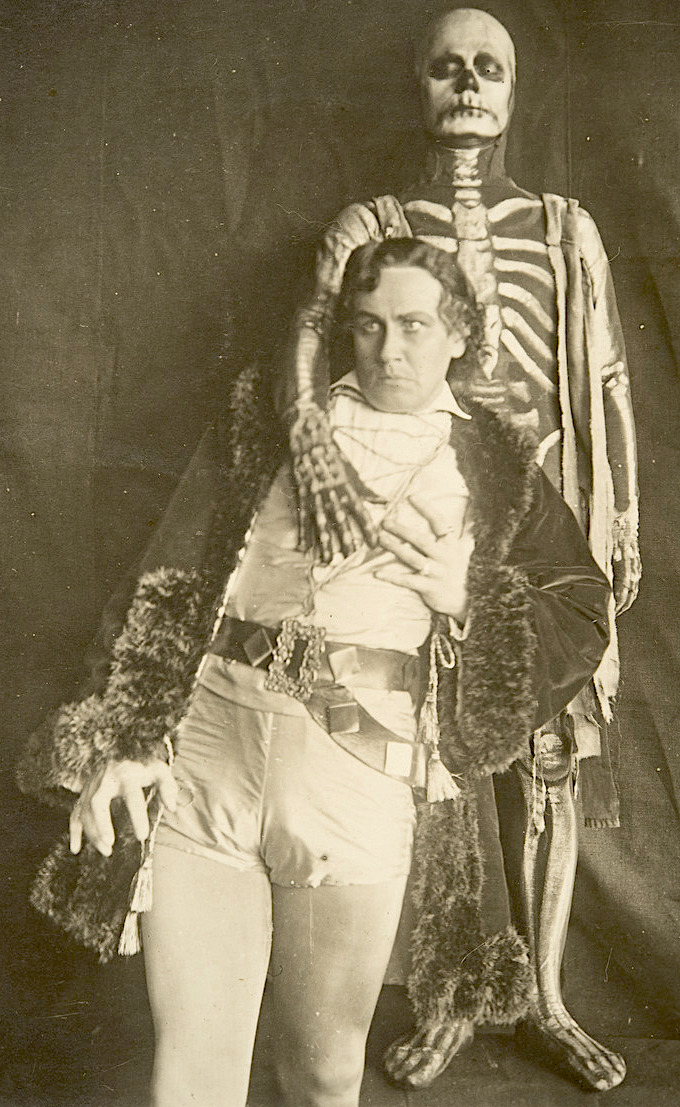
The Finnish actor Urho Somersalmi as Everyman in the 1916 production of Jedermann; behind him, Death—played by Eero Kilpi—reaches for his soul.

Although Jedermann is in one act (without intermission), it roughly subdivides into two de facto, emotionally-distinct sections: before Death reaches Everyman, and after. Sibelius composed 16 numbers, which range from mere seconds (e.g., Nos. I, VI–VII) to ten minutes (No. XI). It features three vocal soloists, who are among the guests at the banquet. A typical performance of the score lasts between 40 and 49 minutes (although the play is two hours in duration).

Roles		Premiere cast (5 November 1916)	Revival cast (11 December 1935)
in English	in Finnish	Premiere cast (5 November 1916)	Revival cast (11 December 1935)
Prologue	Proloogi	Jussi Snellman	?
The Lord God	Herran däni	Axel Ahlberg	?
Death	Kuolema	Eero Kilpi	Teuvo Puro
Everyman	Jokamies	Urho Somersalmi	Urho Somersalmi
The Good Friend	Ystävä	Jaakko Korhonen	Joel Rinne
The Cook	Kokki	Iisakki Lattu	Turo Kartto
The Poor Neighbor	Köyhä naapuri	Emil Falck	Eero Eloranta
The Bailiff	Vouti	Eino Jurkka	Jorma Nortimo
The Debtor	Velkavanki	Evert Suonio	Eero Kilpi
The Debtor's Wife	Velkavangin vaimo	Mimmi Lähteenoja	Laura Tudeer
The Mother	Äiti	Katri Rautio	Tyyne Haarla
The Paramour	Mielitietty	Lilli Tulenheimo	Ruth Snellman
The Fat Cousin	Paksu serkku	Paavo Jännes	Aku Korhonen
The Skinny Cousin	Laiha serkku	Aapo Pihlajamäki	Rafael Pihlaja
Mammon	Mammona	Adolf Lindfors	Yrjö Tuominen
Good Works	Hyvät työt	Hilda Pihlajamäki	Liisa Pakarinen
Faith	Usko	Helmi Lindelöf	Kyllikki Väre
The Monk	Munkki	Eino Jurkka	?
The Devil	Piru	Teuvo Puro	Uuno Laakso
Chorus [banquet guests (young men and ladies), angels]

1. Largo
2. Largo
3. Allegro—IIIa. Allegro comodo
4. Tanssilaulu (Dance Song): Me kutsun saimme ystävän luo ... (A friend has invited us here ...). Tempo commodo^{T, B, C}
5. On riemussa hetket mennehet taas ... (In sweet joy the time passes ...). Tempo andante^{S}
6. Kun vettä sataa, niin kastutaan ... (Well, when it rains, it is wet ...). Un poco con moto^{S}
7. Maat ja metsät viheriöivät ... (Forests are becoming green all around ...). Tempo moderato^{S, B}
8. Oi, Lempi, armas Lempi! ... (Alas, alas, Lady Love ...). Allegretto^{B, C}
9. Maat ja metsät viheriöivät ... (Forests are becoming green all around ...). Tempo moderato^{C}
10. Allegro molto
11. Largo, sempre misterioso
12. Adagio di molto
13. Adagio di molto (continued)
14. Largo e molto—Doloroso—Con grande dolore
15. Lento
16. Gloria in excelsis Deo ... (Glory to God in the Highest ...). Sempre dolce sin a Fine^{C}
- S song includes soprano
- T song includes tenor
- B song includes baritone
- C song includes mixed choir

== Synopsis ==
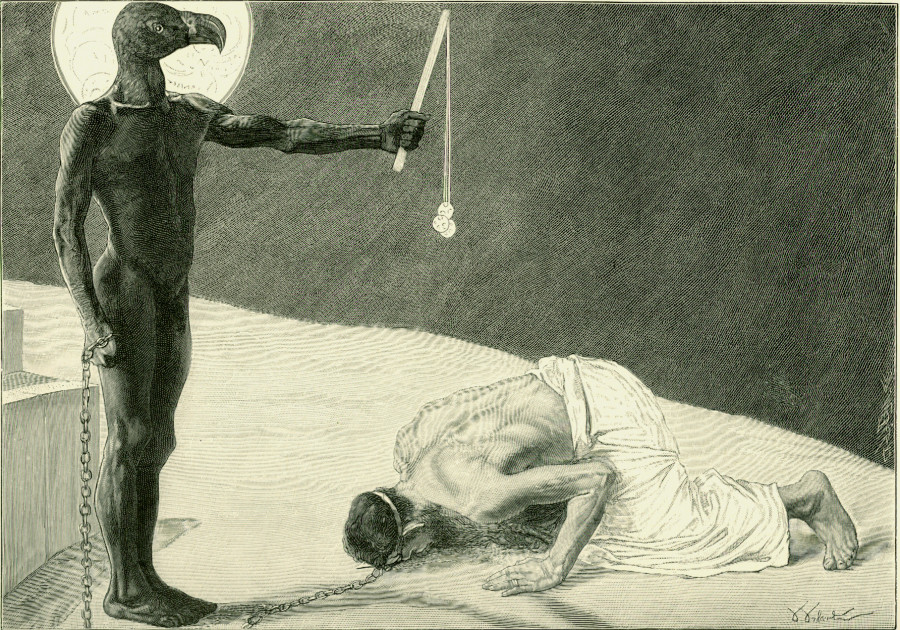
Mammon and His Slave (c. 1896) by Sascha Schneider; in Jedermann, the protagonist is an avaricious bon vivant who spends lavishly and spurns the poor.

As a modern adaptation of the medieval morality play Everyman, Hofmannsthal's Jedermann contains several allegorical characters. The play seeks to "teach people that their earthly existence is transitory": before God, all that matters is one's record of good deeds. However, even at the eleventh hour, repentance of ones sins is possible.

Prologue enters to the sounding of brass (No. I) and implores the audience to heed Everyman's story, for he represents all people. From high above, the Lord God voices his displeasure with humankind: people live in sin and fail to appreciate the Savior's sacrifice on the cross. He summons Death, who arrives flanked by archangels, to fetch the soul of Everyman for Him to judge (No. II). At his palatial home, Everyman admires his worldly possessions, relates to the Good Friend his plans for luxurious expenditures, and orders the Cook to prepare a feast for tomorrow's banquet. He is visited by the Poor Neighbor, as well as by the Debtor (whom the Bailiff marches to prison; the Debtor's Wife and hungry children follow behind), each of whom beg for charity. Everyman spurns the solicitors and eulogizes Mammon, the demon spirit of avarice (the sin of greed). The Mother arrives, urging her son to confess his sins and to enter into holy matrimony, but he impatiently rejects her counsel. With the Paramour (the sin of fornication), he looks forward to the banquet (No. III).

Everyman caresses the Paramour at the banquet (No. IIIa)—there, the candle-lit dining table is lavishly decorated with expensive food and drink (the sin of gluttony). The guests sing and dance (No. IV), but the festive atmosphere sours for Everyman, who senses Death's approach. Paranoid, he runs from the table; when the Paramour goes to calm him, he asks her if she would follow him forever, even in death. The guests resume singing and dancing (Nos. V–VII), restoring Everyman's good humor. However, during a love song, Everyman alone hears the deathly tolling of the bell (No. VIII). To steady his nerves, he imbibes more wine and listens as the oblivious guests sing a canon (No. IX, a modification of No. VII). At the end of this song, Everyman alone hears the ghostly calling of his name. Again, the guests make merry (No. X) until the arrival of Death, whom they see standing forbiddingly behind Everyman—everyone (including the Paramour) flee, except for the Good Friend, the Fat Cousin, and the Skinny Cousin. Although the spirit permits Everyman to bring a companion on his final journey, all three men refuse—for they, too, would die. Abandoned, Everyman resolves to bring that which he holds most dear, his fortune, but the servants and horses carrying his treasure chest scatter upon seeing Death. Everyman now caresses the chest; the lid opens to reveal Mammon, who ruthlessly disowns and mocks his "slave".

Good Works appears as a sickly woman laying on a filthy bed, symbolizing the lack of compassion and rectitude with which Everyman has lived. In a gentle, soft voice, she tells him that she is too weak to safely guide him on the road to the afterlife, and instructs him to look instead to her sister, Faith, for salvation (No. XII). Under Faith's guidance, Everyman repents his sins and prays for forgiveness; to the sound of an organ chorale, he has a vision of the Mother attending morning mass and realizing her son has been redeemed (No. XIII). Having purified his soul, Everyman—now carrying a pilgrim's staff and clothed in a white robe he has received from the Monk—sets out for his grave accompanied by Faith and Good Works (her health restored). As a final hurdle, the Devil arrives aggrieved, protesting that because Everyman had lived in sin and never had any use for religion, the soul properly belongs him (No. XIV). However, the two sisters, as well as a group of angels, block his path, and Faith tells the Devil the ringing of the bell now indicates Everyman's eternal life with the Lord God. With Good Works, Everyman enters his tomb (No. XV), as Faith intones: "Now, he has completed his human lot, and appears naked and bare before the Supreme Judge, and only his works will assist him and speak in his favor. Redeem him ..." The play concludes with the angels singing a hymn of praise to the Lord God (No. XVI).

== Music ==
Jedermann is scored for soprano, tenor, baritone, mixed choir, 2 flutes, oboe, 2 clarinets, bassoon, 2 horns, 2 trumpets, strings, timpani, piano, and organ.

== Discography ==
The Finnish conductor Osmo Vänskä, the Lahti Symphony Orchestra, and the Lahti Chamber Choir made the world premiere studio recording on 11–13 January 1995 for BIS records. In 2014, Leif Segerstam, the Tampere Philharmonic Orchestra, and the Chorus Cathedralis Aboensis also recorded the complete incidental music. Given the close symbiosis between Sibelius's score and von Hofmannthal's text, critics have divided over the merits of the music as a concert item divorced from the stage. Writing in Gramophone, Andrew Achenbach received Jedermann positively, describing it as "a venture that incontestably ignited [Sibelius's] imagination—just sample the searchingly inspired string-writing in [Nos. XI and XIV], the commodious skip of [Nos. IV and VIII], or the stoically affirmative angels' chorus which closes proceedings". Similarly, Michael Scott Rohan for BBC Music Magazine complimented the "starkly original segments, [No. XI] especially, attractive choral songs and final Gloria ... the overall effect is somewhat funereal". However, he conceded that Segerstam's "austere pace ... deepened the gloom" perhaps too greatly, and noted a preference of Vänskä's "livelier" interpretation. In a more ambivalent take, Leslie Wright of MusicWeb International concluded that "much of [Jedermann] does not stand as well on its own ... [it] is slow and sombre ... [and] quiet". Nevertheless, she found "more than enough here to sustain interest and virtually all of it sounds like no one but Sibelius ... [there is] some lively and tuneful music". David Hurwitz's opinion on Classics Today, however, is dismissive: "Sibelius never made a suite ... and for good reason. There's nothing here that works independently of the play ... Much of the music is athematic ... minutes of utter nothingness ... aside from being exceptionally slow, it's also exceptionally repetitious". The table below lists all commercially available recordings of Jedermann:

No.	Conductor	Orchestra	Soprano	Tenor	Baritone	Choir	Rec. (Note: Refers to the year in which the performers recorded the work; this may not be the same as the year in which the recording was first released to the general public.)	Time	Recording venue	Label	Ref.
1	Osmo Vänskä	Lahti Symphony Orchestra	Lilli Paasikivi	Petri Lehto	Sauli Tiilikainen	Lahti Chamber Choir	1995	40:29	Ristinkirkko	BIS	(Note: O. Vänskä–BIS (CD-735) 1995)
2	Leif Segerstam	Turku Philharmonic Orchestra	Pia Pajala	Tuomas Katajala	Nicholas Söderlund	Chorus Cathedralis Aboensis	2014	49:18	Turku Concert Hall	Naxos	(Note: L. Segerstam–Naxos (8.573340) 2015)

== Notes, references, and sources ==
=== Sources ===
Books

- Barnett, Andrew (2007). Sibelius. New Haven, Connecticut: Yale University Press. ISBN 978-0-300-16397-1.
- Goss, Glenda Dawn (2009). Sibelius: A Composer's Life and the Awakening of Finland. Chicago: University of Chicago Press. ISBN 978-0-226-00547-8.
- Grimley, Daniel (2021). Jean Sibelius: Life, Music, Silence. Reaktion Books. ISBN 978-1-78914-466-6.
- Tawaststjerna, Erik (2008) [1978/1988; trans. 1997]. Sibelius: Volume III, 1914–1957. Translated by Layton, Robert. London: Faber and Faber. ISBN 978-0-571-24774-5.

Liner notes

- Kurki, Eija (1995). Sibelius: Jedermann, Op. 83 (Jokamies / Everyman) / Belshazzar's Feast, Op. 51 (original score) / The Countess's Portrait (CD booklet). Translated by Barnett, Andrew. Osmo Vänskä & Lahti Symphony Orchestra. BIS. p. 5–8. CD–735.
- Wells, Dominic (2015). Sibelius: Jedermann / Two Serious Melodies / In memoriam (CD booklet). Leif Segerstam & Turku Philharmonic Orchestra. Naxos. p. 2–4. 8.573340.
- Barnett, Andrew (2009). The Sibelius Edition, Vol. X: Piano Music II (CD booklet). Folke Gräsbeck. BIS. p. 17–30. CD–1927.

Newspapers (by date)

- "Svenska teatern" [At the Swedish Theatre]. Hufvudstadsbladet (in Swedish). No. 294. 29 October 1916. p. 15.
- "Svenska teatern: Det gamla spelet om Enhvar" [At the Swedish Theatre: The old play of Everyman]. Hufvudstadsbladet (in Swedish). No. 297. 1 November 1916. pp. 7–8.
- Lahdensuo, Jalmari [in Finnish] (1 November 1916). "Jokamies: Vanha näytelmä rikkaan miehen kuolemasta" [Everyman: An old play about the death of a rich man]. Otava (in Finnish). No. 11. pp. 514–520.
- "Kansallisteatteri" [The National Theatre]. Uusi Suometar (in Finnish). No. 300. 5 November 1916. p. 10.
- B. C. (6 November 1916). "Jean Sibelius musik till moraliteten Enhvar på Finska teatern" [Jean Sibelius's music for the morality Everyman at the Finnish Theatre]. Dagens Press (in Swedish). No. 258. p. 2.
- "E. K–vi." [Kivijärvi, Erkki] [in Finnish] (6 November 1916). "Kansallisteatteri: Eilinen ensiesitys" [The National Theatre: Yesterday's premiere]. Helsingin Sanomat (in Finnish). No. 302. p. 3.
- "Hj. L." [Lenning, Hjalmar] [in Finnish] (6 November 1916). "Finska teatern: Jokamies" [At the Finnish Theatre: Everyman]. Hufvudstadsbladet (in Swedish). No. 302. p. 4.
- "L. M." [Madetoja, Leevi] (7 November 1916). "Jean Sibeliuksen näyttämömusiikki Jokamieheen" [Jean Sibelius's stage music for Everyman]. Helsingin Sanomat (in Finnish). No. 303. p. 6.
- "V. T." [Tarkiainen, Viljo] [in Finnish] (7 November 1916). "Kansallisteatteri: Jokamies" [At the National Theatre: Everyman]. Uusi Suometar (in Finnish). No. 302. p. 5.
- t i. (12 November 1916). "Jokamies Kansallisteatterissa" [Everyman at the National Theatre]. Turun Sanomat (in Finnish). No. 3615B. pp. 1–2.
- "Jokamies: Kansallisteatter Sibelius juhla näytäntönä" [Everyman: The National Theatre's Sibelius celebration performance]. Helsingin Sanomat (in Finnish). No. 344. 21 December 1935. p. 29.
- Ross, Alex (23 June 1996). "Recordings view: A serious image made up of bold, even weird strokes". The New York Times. p. 30.

Websites

- Achenbach, Andrew (2015). "Sibelius: Pelléas et Mélisande / Jedermann / Two Serious Melodies". gramophone.co.uk. Gramophone.
- Kurki, Eija (2018). "Sibelius's music for Everyman". SibeliusOne.com. Sibelius One.
- Kurki, Eija (2020). "Einar Nilson: Composer of the first Jedermann music". SibeliusOne.com. Sibelius One.
- Hurwitz, David. "Sibelius: The Misery Album". classicstoday.com. Classics Today.
- Rohan, Michael Scott (2015). "Sibelius: Jedermann conducted by Leif Segerstam". classical-music.com. BBC Music Magazine.
- Sirén, Vesa [in Finnish]. "Incidental music: Op. 83 Everyman (Jedermann)". sibelius.fi. Finnish Club of Helsinki.
- Wright, Leslie (2015). "Review: Sibelius's Jedermann". musicweb-international.com. MusicWeb International.
