= Aatamin puvussa ja vähän Eevankin (disambiguation) =

Aatamin puvussa ja vähän Eevankin is a 1928 novel by Finnish writer and novelist Yrjö Soini under his pen name Agapetus.

Aatamin puvussa ja vähän Eevankin may also refer to:

- Aatamin puvussa ja vähän Eevankin (1931 film), directed by Jaakko Korhonen
- Aatamin puvussa ja vähän Eevankin (1940 film), directed by Ossi Elstelä
- Aatamin puvussa ja vähän Eevankin (1971 film), directed by Matti Kassila
