= In Adam's Dress and a Bit in Eve's Too =

In Adam's Dress and a Bit in Eve's Too may refer to:

- In Adam's Dress and a Bit in Eve's Too (1931 film)
- In Adam's Dress and a Bit in Eve's Too (1940 film)
- In Adam's Dress and a Bit in Eve's Too (1971 film)
