= Old Baron of Rautakylä =

1923 Finnish horror film

- The Finnish DVD cover
- Directed by: Carl Fager
- Written by: Carl Fager
- Based on: Gamla baron på Rautakylä by Zachris Topelius
- Produced by: Erkki Karu
- Starring: Einar Rinne; Adolf Lindfors; Naimi Kari
- Cinematography: Frans Ekebom
- Edited by: Frans Ekebom
- Production company: Suomi-Filmi
- Release date: April 1, 1923 (Finland)
- Running time: 79 minutes
- Country: Finland
- Languages: Silent film; Finnish and Swedish intertitles

Old Baron of Rautakylä (Finnish: Rautakylän vanha paroni, Swedish: Gamla baron på Rautakylä) is a Finnish silent horror film made in 1923, written and directed by Carl Fager and produced by Erkki Karu. The film is based on the novella Gamla baron på Rautakylä and the play Efter femtio år, both written by Zachris Topelius. The film premiered on April 1, 1923 at the Kino-Palatsi cinema in Helsinki, Finland.

Old Baron of Rautakylä is the very first Finnish horror film ever made. It was filmed at Suomi-Filmi's Vironkatu studio in Helsinki and at the Herttoniemi Manor in the Herttoniemi district. The film footage of the film has survived, but the intertitles and original screenplay have lost.

== Cast ==
- Einar Rinne as Baron Gustaf Drakenhjelm
- Adolf Lindfors as Baron Magnus Drakenhjelm
  - Felix Borg as Young Magnus
- Naimi Kari as Lisette Hallström
  - Aili Kari as Young Lisette
- Axel Slangus as Sebastian Hallström, the son of Lisette and Magnus
- Joel Rinne as Reverend Richard von Dahlen
- Emil Lindh as Tuomas, Mrs. Hjelm's driver
- Ossi Korhonen as servant
- Jalo Lesche as farmforker of Rautakylä
- Ida Brander as Mrs. Ebba Hjelm née Reutercrona
  - Catherine Will as Young Ebba
- Irja Lindström as courtier
- Arna Högdahl as Lotten Ringius, the granddaughter of Ebba
- Bruno Aspelin as King Gustav III of Sweden
- Knut Weckman as Count Reutercrona
- Phyllis Sjöström as Countess Höpkén
- Aune Lindström as courtier
