= Elanto =

Elanto may refer to:

- Elanto (cooperative), cooperative in Finland, 1905-2003
- HOK-Elanto, cooperative in Finland, since 2004, part of S Group
- Herra Elanto, or "Mr. Elanto", a 1930 silent Finnish film directed by Erkki Karu
