= Finlandia (film) =

1922 film directed by Erkki Karu

- Directed by: Erkki Karu; Eero Leväluoma
- Production company: Suomi-Filmi
- Release date: 1922
- Running time: 95 minutes
- Country: Finland
- Languages: Silent film; Finnish and Swedish intertitles

Finlandia is a 1922 Finnish documentary and propaganda film.

== Production ==
Finlandia was a major early Finnish documentary. Both it and another film, Finland (1911), were made to market Finland abroad. Before independence of Finland, most of the film production consisted of non-feature films. Finlandia was directed Erkki Karu and Eero Leväluoma. It was commissioned by the Foreign Ministry of Finland.

== Content ==
Finlandia (1922)

The film is 95 minutes long and it is divided in six acts. It is a government-produced propaganda film that introduces the nature, sports, military, agriculture and capital of Finland.

== Impact ==
The film achieved some success abroad. It was screened in around 40 countries. Versions were made in various languages.

== Reconstructions ==
The original version of the film has been lost. However, it has since then been reconstructed.

== See also ==
- Cinema of Finland
- List of Finnish films of 1917–39
