= List of Finnish films before 1917 =

A list of films produced in Finland ordered by year of release. For an alphabetical list of Finnish films see Category:Finnish films

The numbers in the Notes column refer to the numbering used by Suomen kansallisfilmografia. These numbers are given to all full-length films which have been shown in public theaters as a headlining or co-headlining film. Suomen kansallisfilmografia uses the minimum length of 37 minutes to qualify for a film to be listed, however the earliest films may be shorter than this (as 37 minutes was not even technically possible).

Title	Director	Cast	Genre	Notes
1907
Salaviinanpolttajat	Louis Sparre, Teuvo Puro	Teppo Raikas, Eero Kilpi, Teuvo Puro	Comedy, Crime	1907/1 First Finnish fictional film, All copies believed to be destroyed.
1908
Vasikan häntä	?	Riika Raunio-Pakarinen, Waldemar Raunio	Comedy	1908/1 All copies believed to be destroyed.
1909 No known Finnish films produced this year.
1910 No known Finnish films produced this year.
1911 No known Finnish films produced this year.
1912
Margaretaa ajetaan takaa	K.E. Ståhlberg	Herra Bengelsdorf, Bror Berger	Comedy	1912/1 All copies believed to be destroyed
Rusthollari Pettersonin Helsinginmatka	Bror Berger	Bror Berger, a pig	Comedy	1912/2 First film to go through Finnish film board approval inspection (established in 1911), All copies believed to be destroyed
1913
Sylvi	Teuvo Puro	Teuvo Puro, Aili Rosvall-Somersalmi, Teppo Raikas	Drama	1913/1 Oldest Finnish film with known existing film fragments
Verettömät	Kaarle Halme	Oskar Krabbe, Hilma Rantanen, Mandi Terho	Drama	1913/2 All copies believed to be destroyed
Nuori luotsi	Kaarle Halme	Konrad Tallroth, Hilma Rantanen, John Precht	Drama	1913/3 All copies believed to be destroyed
Kosto on suloista	?	?	Comedy, Crime	1913/4 All copies believed to be destroyed
Kun onni pettää	Konrad Tallroth	Axel Precht, Sigrid Precht, Konrad Tallroth	Drama	1913/5 All copies believed to be destroyed
1914
Se kolmas	?	Birger Pohjanheimo, Hilarius Pohjanheimo, Adolf Pohjanheimo	Romantic drama	1914/1 All copies believed to be destroyed
Pirteä ja kadonnut kori	?	Birger Pohjanheimo, William Räisänen, Hilda Räisänen	Comedy	1914/2 All copies believed to be destroyed
Salainen perintömääräys	?	Hilarius Pohjanheimo, Helinä Svensson, William Rölling, Birger Pohjanheimo	Crime	1914/3 All copies believed to be destroyed
Väärennetty osoite	?	?	Crime	1914/4 All copies believed to be destroyed
Nainen, jonkas minulle annoit	?	?	Romantic drama	1914/5 All copies believed to be destroyed
Tuiskusen kuherruskuukausi	?	?	Romantic drama	1914/6 All copies believed to be destroyed
Kalle Pettersson	?	?	Crime	1914/7 All copies believed to be destroyed
Käpäsen rakkausseikkailu	?	?	Romantic comedy	1914/8 All copies believed to be destroyed
Vieraalla maaperällä	Kaarle Halme	Tyyne Halme, rva Enroth, Kaarle Halme	Drama	1914/9 All copies believed to be destroyed
Kaksi sankaria	?	?	Romantic comedy	1914/10 All copies believed to be destroyed
1915
Kesä	Kaarle Halme	Hilma Rantanen, Mandi Terho, Oskar Krabbe, Sigrid Precht	Romantic drama	1915/1 All copies believed to be destroyed
Rikosten runtelema	?	Eino Salmela, Helinä Svensson	Drama	1915/2 All copies believed to be destroyed
"Peski", "Lappa" ja poliisit	Bror Berger	Bror Berger, Harald Sandberg, Georg Grönroos	Comedy	1915/3 All copies believed to be destroyed
1916
Katoavia timantteja	Bror Berger	Arvid Hammarlund, Inga Saar, Harald Sandberg, Bror Berger	Crime	1916/1 First Finnish film to have a premiere with several screens (2 theaters), All copies believed to be destroyed
Tuhlaajapoika	Sven Bergvall	Svea Peters, Hjalmar Peters, Märta Hallström	Drama	1916/2 All copies believed to be destroyed
Eräs elämän murhenäytelmä	Konrad Tallroth	Mia Backman, Oskar Tengström, Konrad Tallroth	Drama	1916/3 All copies believed to be destroyed
