= The Village Shoemakers =

1923 Finnish film

- Original Finnish silent film
- Finnish: Nummisuutarit
- Directed by: Erkki Karu
- Written by: Artturi Järviluoma
- Based on: Heath Cobblers by Aleksis Kivi
- Produced by: Erkki Karu
- Starring: Axel Slangus; Aku Käyhkö; Alarik Korhonen; Kirsti Suonio
- Cinematography: Kurt Jäger; Frans Ekebom
- Edited by: Erkki Karu
- Music by: Jean Sibelius; Selim Palmgren; Toivo Kuula; Oskar Merikanto
- Production company: SF-Filmi
- Distributed by: Suomen Filmiteollisuus
- Release date: 11 November 1923 (Finland)
- Running time: 83 minutes
- Country: Finland
- Languages: Silent film; Finnish and Swedish intertitles

The Village Shoemakers (Finnish: Nummisuutarit, Swedish: Sockenskomakarne) is a Finnish silent comedy film made in 1923, directed and produced by Erkki Karu, written by Artturi Järviluoma and starred by Axel Slangus. The film is based on the 1864 play Heath Cobblers, written by Aleksis Kivi, and is the first of several film versions of the play.

The film was shot at Suomi-Filmi's Vironkatu studio in Helsinki and outdoor filming was made in the villages of Pilpala and Hunsala in Loppi, Kanta-Häme. The film was a great spectator success, although it was not as popular as another Erkki Karu film completed the same year, Koskenlaskijan morsian. The film has been criticized as the most silent Finnish silent film to watch in Finnish. Kurt Jäger's cinematography in the final scene gets a special mention. It is said to continue to successfully defy the ruthless tooth of time.

The Village Shoemakers premiered on 11 November 1923 in the Bio-Bio and Edison Theaters in Helsinki. The film was also distributed in Sweden and Norway.
