= Yrjö Soini =

Finnish writer

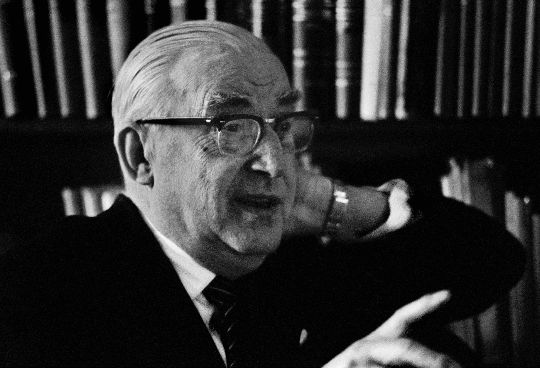
Yrjö Soini (1966)

Yrjö Vilho Soini (17 July 1896 – 6 February 1975) was a Finnish journalist, novelist and playwright, who used the pen name Agapetus. His humorous works enjoyed wide popularity in Finland during the 20th century and several of them have been adapted into films.

Soini was born in Hattula, Kanta-Häme. His family included:

Children: Seppo, Elina and Irma Soini Grandchildren include: Sakari, Ilkka and Lauri Soini Grandgrandchildren: Alexander, Amanda and Silja Soini

He died in Helsinki, aged 78.

== Stage plays ==
- 1927: Olenko minä tullut haaremiin (film adaptation by Waldemar Wohlström in 1932 and by T. J. Särkkä in 1938)
- 1930: Syntipukki (film adaptation by Erkki Karu in 1935 and by Matti Kassila in 1957)
- 1931: Kirjakaupassa
- 1932: Onnellinen Sakari (film adaptation in 1939 under the title Takki ja liivit pois! directed by Jorma Nortimo)
- 1934: Kaikenlaisia vieraita (film adaptation in 1936)
- 1951: Viisi vekkulia (film adaptation in 1956)

== Novels ==
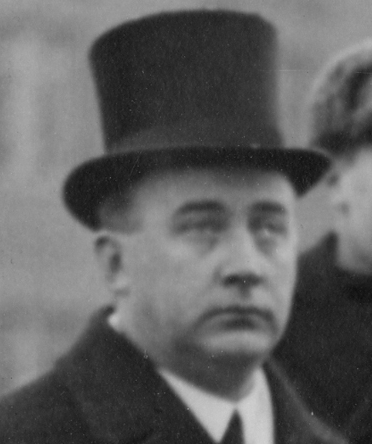
Soini attending the foundation of Kansalaiskorkeakoulu (later University of Tampere), Helsinki 1930.

- 1922: Setä ja serkunpoika
- 1923: Viimeinen lautta
- 1925: Muuan sulhasmies (with a second edition in 1949)
- 1928: Aatamin puvussa ja vähän Eevankin (film adaptations in 1931, 1940, 1959 and 1971)
- 1929: Rovastin häämatkat (film adaptation under the title Rovastin häämatkat in 1931, directed by Jaakko Korhonen)
- 1931: Ei mitään selityksiä
- 1933: Totinen torvensoittaja (film adaptation in 1941)
- 1934: Jaarlin sisar (historical novel published under his real name Yrjö Soini)
- 1934: Kukkatarhassa
- 1935: Asessorin naishuolet (film adaptations in 1937 and 1958)
- 1936: Hilman päivät (film adaptation in 1954 under the title Hilmanpäivät)
- 1937: Pitäjänvaras
- 1946: Tulkaa meille
- 1955: Elämän valhe
- 1957: Musta kissa
- 1962: Kaikkien pappien täti
- 1967: Vanha frakki

== Other works / Books ==
- 1931: Akkojen kauhuna eli tuumailuja tuulilasin takaa
- 1950: Helsingin poika, 1950 (biography of J. A. Ehrenström)
- 1956: Kuin Pietari hiilivalkealla – Sotasyyllisyysasian vaiheet 1944−1949
- 1960: Kuulovartiossa
- 1963: Vieraanvaraisuus ammattina – kulttuurihistoriallinen katsaus Suomen majoitus- ja ravitsemuselinkeinon kehitykseen I−II
- 1965: Kalkki-Petteri, 1965 (biography of Petter Forsström)
- 1968: Toinen näytös – entä kolmas? – Sotasyyllisyysasian myöhemmät vaiheet
- 1974: Haikon kartano vuosisatojen saatossa 1362−1966
