= The Rapids-Rider's Brides (1923 film) =

1923 Finnish film directed by Erkki Karu

- Finnish: Koskenlaskijan morsian
- Swedish: Forsfararens brud
- Directed by: Erkki Karu
- Written by: Erkki Karu
- Based on: Koskenlaskijan morsian by Väinö Kataja (1914 novel)
- Produced by: Erkki Karu
- Starring: Konrad Tallroth; Heidi Korhonen; Jaakko Korhonen; Einar Rinne
- Cinematography: Eino Kari; Kurt Jäger; Oscar Lindelöf; Frans Ekebom
- Edited by: Erkki Karu
- Music by: Uuno Aarto (musical arrangement)
- Production company: Suomi-Filmi
- Distributed by: Suomi-Filmi
- Release date: 1 January 1923 (Finland)
- Running time: 82 minutes
- Country: Finland
- Languages: Silent; Finnish and Swedish intertitles

The Rapids-Rider's Brides (Finnish: Koskenlaskijan morsian, Swedish: Forsfararens brud) is a 1923 Finnish silent film directed, written, and produced by Erkki Karu. The film is based on the 1914 novel of the same name by Väinö Kataja. It was Karu's first feature-length film.

The film was shot at Suomi-Filmi's studio on Vironkatu in Helsinki as well as on location in the village of Tapola in Iitti and at Mankala Rapids, where the Mankala Hydroelectric Plant was later built in 1950. It was the most popular Finnish film of the 1920s and was exported to around ten countries, including Japan. The film premiered on 1 January 1923, at Kino-Palatsi in Helsinki.

The film was a commercial success, being sold to multiple countries.

The Rapids-Rider's Brides (1923)

The story revolves around love and reconciliation amidst the threat of death. After a young man drowns in the rapids, his neighbor Heikki (played by Jaakko Korhonen) is blamed. Heikki's son Juhani (Einar Rinne) seeks to make peace and hopes to marry Hanna (Heidi Korhonen), the drowned man's sister. However, Hanna is in love with Antti from Koskenalusta (Oiva Soini).

== Cast ==
- Konrad Tallroth as Iisakki, the master of Nuottaniemi
- Heidi Korhonen (Blåfield) as Hanna, Iisakki's daughter
- Jaakko Korhonen as Heikki, the master of Paloniemi
- Einar Rinne as Juhani, Heikki's son
- Aku Käyhkö as Kero-Pieti, a preacher
- Oiva Soini as Antti, from Koskenalusta
- Kirsti Suonio as Anna
- Carl Fager as a logger
- Eero Leväluoma as a logger
- Uuno Eskola as a logger
- Joel Rinne as a logger
- Uuno Aarto as a logger
- Jussi Hagberg as the logger steering the raft
- Emil Mikkola as a logger on the raft
- Eva Luttinen as a congregation member
- Gunnar Stenblom as a congregation member
- Juho Puls as a congregation member

== Production ==
Jussi Hagberg served as the film's log driving expert. Still photography was provided by Kalle Havas and Kosti Lehtinen.
