= Jääkärin morsian =

Jääkärin morsian (The Bride of the Jaeger) is a Finnish play. It was written by Sam Sihvo and produced in 1921. The play tells the story of Jaegers who are in military training in Germany to prepare for the Finnish War of Independence. It has been presented constantly; according to Ilonna's theater performance database, the play has been performed 97 times in Finnish professional theaters. In the 2000s, Jääkärin morsian was performed at the Mikkeli Theater in the period 2000–2001 and at the Vaasa City Theater in the period 2002–2004.

The play was published in 1921. It has been the subject of two film adaptations, a version directed by Kalle Kaarna from 1931 and a version by Risto Orko from 1938.

Jääkärin morsian was performed at the Red Mill Theater in Helsinki in the autumn of 1948. In a note sent to Carl Enckell, then Foreign Minister, on December 5, 1948, A. In Finland, hostile propaganda to the Soviet Union. However, the Red Mill had previously announced that the performances of the Jääkäri bride would end on December 6 in any case. Another play that caught the eye of the Soviets at the same time was Jean-Paul Sartre's Dirty Hands, performed at the Finnish National Theater.

Jääkärin morsian was Jouko Turkka's first directorial work done at the Törnävä summer theater in Seinäjoki.
