= Väinö Lehmus =

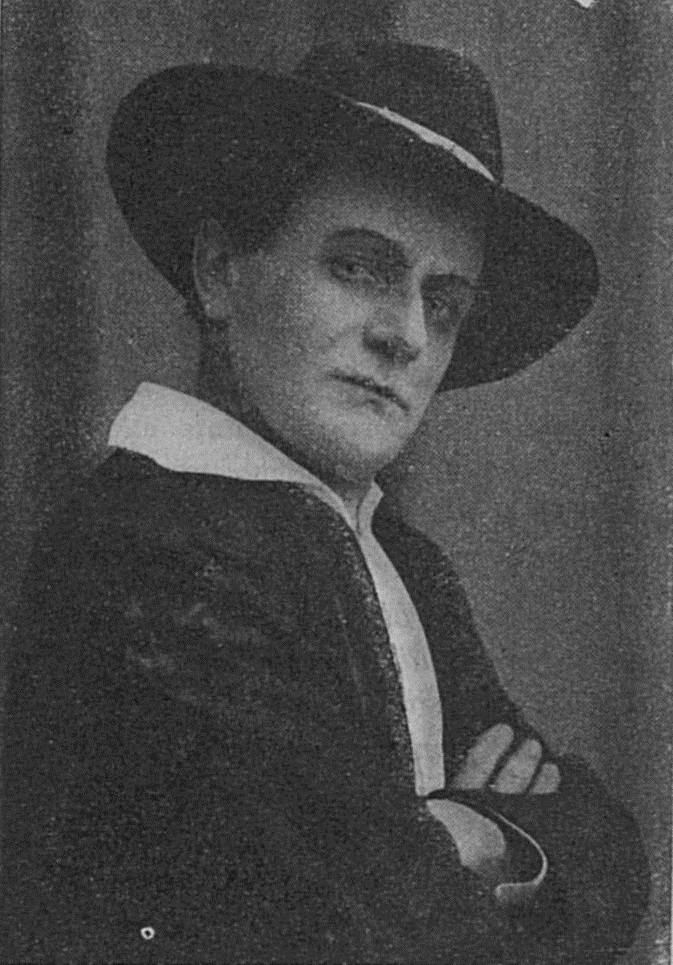
- Born: Väinö Armas Lind; 11 January 1886; Lempäälä, Grand Duchy of Finland, Russian Empire
- Died: 6 April 1936 (aged 50); Lohja, Finland
- Occupation: Actor
- Years active: 1906–1922
- Spouse: Hildur Aurora Lehmus (née Enbom)

Väinö Lehmus (born Väinö Armas Lind; 11 January 1886 – 6 April 1936) was a Finnish stage and film and radio actor of the early 20th century.

== Career ==
Väinö Lehmus was born Väinö Armas Lind. His father was a tailor. He initially attended trade school before studying for a business career. He began his acting career at the Tampere Theatre in 1906 and from 1915 to 1917 toured Finland performing in comedic operettas, often in the company of actor Iivari Kainulainen. Lehmus also served as the director for many working class theaters and was the theater director for the Vyborg Worker's Theatre from 1927 to 1928. He was also the property manager and stage director for Harjula Oy, a children's educational facility in Lohja.

In addition to a long career on the Finnish stages, Väinö Lehmus performed in approximately seven early Finnish silent films; the first two of which, 1920's Kilu-Kallen ja Mouku-Franssin kosioretki and 1921's Kun solttu-Juusosta tuli herra, he also was the screenwriter. Both films were comedic shorts directed by Hjalmar V. Pohjanheimo. With the exception of two films released in 1920, directed by Erkki Karu, all of his subsequent film appearances were directed by Pohjanheimo. The last being 1921's Sunnuntaimetsästäjät, which was a feature-length film. Most of Lehmus's film appearances were in comedic roles.

== Personal life ==
Väinö Lehmus was married to actress Hildur Aurora Lehmus (née Enbom, 1891–1967) from 1912 until his death in 1936. His sister Saima Lehmus-Veijonen (1895-1974) and brother Toivo Lehmus (1901-1969) were also actors and appeared in early Finnish films.
