= Aatamin puvussa ja vähän Eevankin =

1928 novel by Yrjö Soini

Aatamin puvussa ja vähän Eevankin stylized as Aatamin puvussa... ja vähän Eevankin is a novel by the Finnish writer Yrjö Soini, under his pen name Agapetus. It was published in 1928.

== Film adaptations ==
The popular book has been subject to a number of film adaptations. The first was by Finnish film director Jaakko Korhonen in 1931 becoming the first Finnish sound film. The second was in 1940 directed by Finnish director Ossi Elstelä.

In 1959, a version destined for the West German market was released. The film was directed by Franz M. Lang.

A more recent adaptation was in 1971 when Matti Kassila wrote a storyline based on the novel and directed the film starring Heikki Kinnunen and Juha Hyppönen.
