= In Adam's Dress and a Bit in Eve's Too (1940 film) =

1940 Finnish comedy film

Aatamin puvussa – ja vähän Eevankin...
- Screenshot
- Directed by: Ossi Elstelä
- Written by: Nisse Hirn; Yrjö Soini
- Based on: Aatamin puvussa ja vähän Eevankin by Yrjö Soini
- Produced by: T.J. Särkkä
- Starring: Sirkka Sipilä; Tauno Palo; Leo Lähteenmäki; Jalmari Rinne
- Cinematography: Kalle Peronkoski; Marius Raichi
- Edited by: Armas Vallasvuo
- Music by: Martti Similä
- Release date: 18 August 1940
- Running time: 77 minutes
- Country: Finland
- Language: Finnish

In Adam's Dress and a Bit in Eve's Too (Finnish: Aatamin puvussa – ja vähän Eevankin...) is a 1940 Finnish comedy film directed by Ossi Elstelä and written by Nisse Hirn based on the novel Aatamin puvussa ja vähän Eevankin by Yrjö Soini. The film's runtime is 77 minutes.

== Cast ==
- Sirkka Sipilä .... Alli
- Tauno Palo .... Aarne Himanen
- Leo Lähteenmäki .... Paavo Kehkonen
- Jalmari Rinne.... Viirimäki
- Yrjö Tuominen .... Vilho Vikström
- Valter Tuomi .... Police chief
- Irja Kuusla .... Liina
- Maikki Sälehovi .... Puuska's wife
- Rafael Stenius .... Puuska

== See also ==
- Aatamin puvussa ja vähän Eevankin (1931 film)
- Two Times Adam, One Time Eve (1959 West German film)
- Aatamin puvussa ja vähän Eevankin (1971 film)
