= Carl von Haartman =

Finnish military officer, actor and film director

- Born: 6 July 1897; Helsinki, Grand Duchy of Finland, Russian Empire
- Died: 27 August 1980 (aged 83); El Alamillo, Spain
- Other names: Goggi

Carl "Goggi" von Haartman (6 July 1897, Helsinki, Finland – 27 August 1980, El Alamillo, Spain) was a Finnish lieutenant colonel, writer, film actor, and film director.

In the late 1920s, Haartman lived in the United States and worked in Hollywood. He played the Zeppelin commander in Hell's Angels (1930) directed by Howard Hughes and starring Jean Harlow. He fought in the Finnish Civil War for the White Guard, in the Spanish Civil War for the Nationalist side, and for Finnish Army in the Winter War and Continuation War.

His daughter and her family currently live in Spain.

== Partial filmography ==
- Hotel Imperial (1927)
- Very Confidential (1927)
- The Awakening (1928)
- Hell's Angels (1930)
