= In Adam's Dress and a Bit in Eve's Too (1931 film) =

1931 film

Aatamin puvussa ja vähän Eevankin
- Directed by: Jaakko Korhonen
- Screenplay by: Jaakko Korhonen
- Based on: Aatamin puvussa... ja vähän Eevankin by Yrjö Soini
- Starring: Joel Rinne; Elsa Segerberg; Yrjö Tuominen
- Cinematography: Eino Kari
- Music by: Martti Similä
- Distributed by: Suomi-Filmi
- Release date: 2 February 1931
- Running time: 104 minutes
- Country: Finland
- Languages: Finnish (Note: Singing only); Finnish and Swedish intertitles

In Adam's Dress and a Bit in Eve's Too (Finnish: Aatamin puvussa ja vähän Eevankin, Swedish: I Adams kläder och litet i Evas) is a 1931 Finnish comedy film directed and written by Jaakko Korhonen based on the novel Aatamin puvussa ja vähän Eevankin by Yrjö Soini. The film's runtime is 104 minutes. It is the first Finnish film to have sound, although sound is limited to sound effects and some singing. The dialogue is still only displayed in bilingual intertitles.

In 1959 the film was remade in West Germany as Two Times Adam, One Time Eve.

== Cast ==
- Joel Rinne as Aarne Himanen
- Elsa Segerberg as Alli
- Yrjö Tuominen as Paavo Kehkonen
- Kaarlo Saarnio as Viirimäki
- Uuno Montonen as Kalle Vikström
- Heikki Välisalmi as Police chief
- Anja Suonio-Similä as Liisa
- Olga Leino as Old woman
- Ellen Sylvin as Lehtinen's daughter
- Kaija Suonio as Mrs. Lehtinen
- Runar Idefeldt as Constable Lehtinen

== See also ==
- In Adam's Dress and a Bit in Eve's Too (1940)
- In Adam's Dress and a Bit in Eve's Too (1971)
- Two Times Adam, One Time Eve (1959)
