= Kirsti Suonio =

Finnish actress

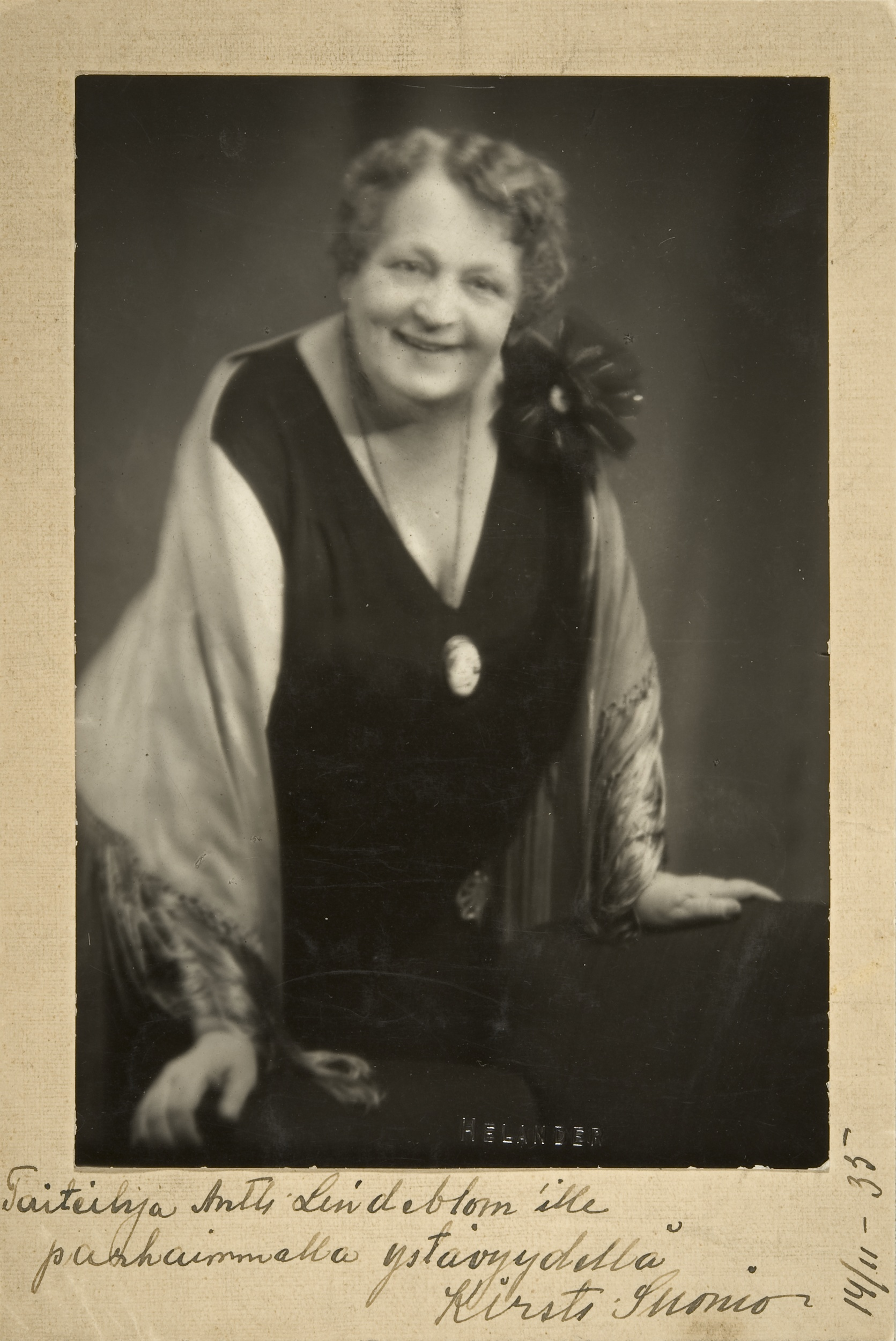
- 1935
- Born: Hilda Kristina Kjäll; 24 July 1872; Helsinki, Finland
- Died: 7 November 1939 (aged 67); Helsinki, Finland
- Other name: Hilda Kristina Sainio
- Occupation: Actress
- Years active: 1919–1939 (film)

Hilda Kristina “Kirsti” Suonio, née Sainio, originally Kjäll (1872–1939) was a Finnish stage and film actress.

== Selected filmography ==
- The Village Shoemakers (1923)
- The Rapids-Rider's Brides (1923)
- Substitute Wife (1936)

== Bibliography ==
- Kääpä, Pietari: Directory of World Cinema: Finland. Intellect Books, 2012.
