= Emil Lindh =

Finnish sailor (1867–1937)

Emil Aleksander Lindh
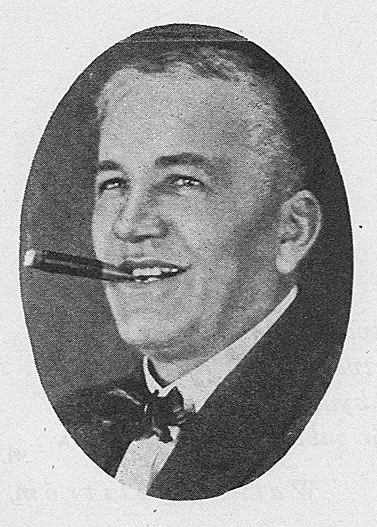
- Lindh in 1933

Personal information
- Full name: Emil Aleksander Lindh
- Born: April 15, 1867
- Died: September 3, 1937 (aged 70)

Achievements and titles
- Olympic finals: 1912 Summer Olympics: 8 m class – Bronze
Medal record
Men's Sailing
Representing Finland
Bronze medal – third place	1912 Stockholm	8 metre class
- Updated on 25 April 2012

Emil Aleksander Lindh (15 April 1867 – 3 September 1937) was a Finnish sailor who competed in the 1912 Summer Olympics.

He was a crew member of the Finnish boat Lucky Girl, which won the bronze medal in the 8 metre class.

He was also an actor in minor roles in eight films, including Rautakylän vanha parooni and Murtovarkaus.
