= Hjalmar V. Pohjanheimo =

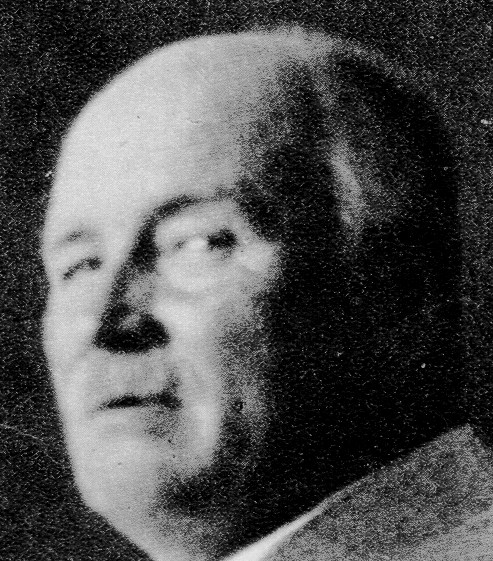
Hjalmar V. Pohjanheimo

Hjalmar V. Pohjanheimo (22 December 1867, in Jyväskylä – 20 August 1936, in Helsinki) was a Finnish film producer and director. Pohjanheimo also owned a number of movie theaters in Finland.

There were 25 films produced during the period of Finnish autonomy, Pohjanheimo produced 15 of these.

== Biography ==
Pohjanheimo, who began his career as a businessman and sawmill in the timber industry, moved into the film industry in 1910 after moving to Helsinki with his family. He owned the Lyyra cinema chain in the 1910s and also owned a film production company called Lyyra Filmi, founded in 1911. Pohjanheimo's Lyyra company had several cinemas all over Finland, all of which were called Lyyra, and they were separated by Roman numerals. One of them operated on Yrjönkatu in Helsinki on the same site as the Edison cinema.

Pohjanheimo bought the feature film Sylvi, shot in 1911, for FIM 4,500 from the filmmaker trio Teuvo Puro, Teppo Raikka and Frans Engström. The film premiered at the Lyyra Theater in Vyborg on February 24, 1913, and was shown in theaters all over Finland during the same year. The success of the film with the public made Pohjanheimo also start producing films himself. In 1913–1914, theater director and actor Kaarle Halme directed four feature films for Lyyra Film (Young Pilot, Bloodless, Summer, On Foreign Ground), which also involved a theater company led by Halme. The other films which Pohjanheimo made were mainly light farce short films, and undercover police adventure Secret Inheritance Order in 1914, produced together with his sons Adolf Pohjanheimo (1888–1958), Hilarius Pohjanheimo (1892–1932), Asser Pohjanheimo (1893–1937) and Birger Pohjanheimo (1895–1936).

In total, Pohjanheimo produced as many as 15 of the 25 Finnish feature films during the period of autonomy. In 1914, Pohjanheimo began producing the first Finnish weekly news review films under the name Lyyran Viikkolehti.

In 1913-15, Pohjanheimo produced a total of 14 feature films of various runtimes. After World War II, Pohjanheimo produced three more short farcees in 1920-21, which he himself directed. Actor Väinö Lehmus was the male lead in all of them.

Pohjanheimo moved out of the film industry in 1922, when he sold his remaining theaters. He owned the Kyyhkylä manor in the rural municipality of Mikkeli and after that he owned the Numlahti manor in Nurmijärvi in 1922-1930. Pohjanheimo lost his property during the years of scarcity in the 1930s, and for the last years he worked as a log dealer in Tapanila, a rural area in Helsinki. He died destitute in 1936.

== Filmography ==
=== As producer ===
- Kosto on suloista. 1913
- Nuori luotsi. 1913
- Verettömät. 1913
- Vieraalla maaperällä. 1914
- Käpäsen rakkausseikkailu. 1914
- Nainen jonkas minulle annoit. 1914
- Salainen perintömääräys. 1914
- Se kolmas. 1914
- Kaksi sankaria. 1914
- Pirteä ja kadonnut kori. 1914
- Tuiskusen kuherruskuukausi. 1914
- Väärennetty osoite. 1914
- Rikosten runtelema. 1915
- Kesä. 1915
- Kilu-Kallen ja Mouku-Franssin kosioretki. 1920
- Sunnuntaimetsästäjät. 1921
- Kun solttu-Juusosta tuli herra. 1921

=== As director ===
- Kosto on suloista. 1913
- Kilu-Kallen ja Mouku-Franssin kosioretki. 1920
- Sunnuntaimetsästäjät. 1921
- Kun solttu-Juusosta tuli herra. 1921
