= Onnenpotku =

Finnish 1936 film directed by Glory Leppänen

- Directed by: Glory Leppänen
- Written by: Erkki Karu; Ensio Rislakki
- Produced by: Erkki Karu; Toivo Särkkä
- Starring: Ester Toivonen; Yrjö Tuominen
- Edited by: Yrjö Norta
- Music by: Olavi Karu
- Production company: Suomen Filmiteollisuus
- Distributed by: Suomen Filmiteollisuus
- Release dates: 21 March 1936 (Bio Rex, Helsinki)
- Running time: 101 min
- Country: Finland
- Language: Finnish
- Budget: FIM 706,745

Onnenpotku (Swedish: Lyckosparken; lit. 'A Stroke of Luck') is a 1936 romantic comedy, notable for being the first feature-length Finnish film by a female director.

== Background ==
The film is based on the earlier Swedish Uppsagd (1934).

The project was started by director and producer Erkki Karu, but when he suddenly died in December 1935, a replacement was needed to continue the work. The production company's CEO Toivo Särkkä would have been the obvious choice, but he declined on the basis of lack of directing experience.

Instead, the project was given to Glory Leppänen, who had many years' experience as an actor and also some as a stage director. She did, however, have something most of the directors at the time lacked: formal training in direction, having attended a course at Regieseminar Max Reinhardt in Vienna. She was ably assisted by the seasoned Yrjö Norta as editor and sound designer.

Much of the crew, as well as the lead cast, were also young and inexperienced. Leppänen later remarked on how difficult it was to direct especially the romantic scenes between the male and female leads, with both actors not only unaccustomed to such work but also very shy.

== Cast ==
- Ester Toivonen — Maire Rauta
- Yrjö Tuominen — K.L. Rauta, industrialist, father of Maire
- Toivo Palmroth (credited as Toivo Palomurto) — Reino Aro, engineer
- Aku Korhonen — 'Hillin Jussi'
- Jorma Nortimo — A. Korppi, company director
- Kaisu Leppänen — Eeva

== Plot ==
During the 1930s depression, the poor and unemployed engineer Reino Aro is secretly in love with Maire Rauta, the daughter of the wealthy industrialist K.L. Rauta. However, the father has other suitors in mind for her. Much confusion and many misunderstandings later, the situation finally resolves leading to a happy ending.

== Legacy ==
Upon its release, Onnenpotku was a box office hit, with over 407,000 cinema tickets sold to date. As of February 2020, it retains the record for the most cinema-goers of any film by a Finnish female director.

The film is in some respects technically flawed, but Leppänen's direction is considered to have brought out good performances of the inexperienced cast. Nevertheless, it remains her only film as a director; although she was invited to stay with the production company, she opted for a theatre career instead.
