= Two Times Adam, One Time Eve =

1959 film

- Directed by: Franz M. Lang
- Written by: Franz M. Lang
- Produced by: Hans Abich
- Starring: Heidi Brühl; Matthias Fuchs; Brigitte Grothum
- Cinematography: Karl Schröder
- Edited by: Ilse Wilken
- Music by: Herbert Jarczyk
- Production company: Filmaufbau
- Distributed by: Pallas Filmverleih
- Release date: 2 October 1959
- Running time: 91 minutes
- Country: West Germany
- Language: German

Two Times Adam, One Time Eve (German: 2 x Adam, 1 x Eve) is a 1959 West German comedy film directed by Franz M. Lang and starring Heidi Brühl, Matthias Fuchs and Brigitte Grothum. The film's sets were designed by the art director Ernst Schomer. The film is a West German remake of the 1931 Finnish film Aatamin puvussa ja vähän Eevankin.

== Cast ==
- Heidi Brühl as Kaarina
- Matthias Fuchs as Peter
- Brigitte Grothum as Silja
- Alfred Balthoff as Kalevi
- Walter Buschhoff as Matti
- Paul Esser as Rat Granberg
- Benno Hoffmann as Lehtinen
- Karl John as Wickström
- Klaus Kindler as Aarne
- Gustav Knuth as Viirimäki
- Carsta Löck as Sinikka
- Ralf Wolter as Paavo

== See also ==
- In Adam's Dress and a Bit in Eve's Too (1931)
- In Adam's Dress and a Bit in Eve's Too (1940)
- In Adam's Dress and a Bit in Eve's Too (1971)

== Bibliography ==
- Goble, Alan. The Complete Index to Literary Sources in Film. Walter de Gruyter, 1999.
