= Ida Brander =

Finnish-Swedish actress

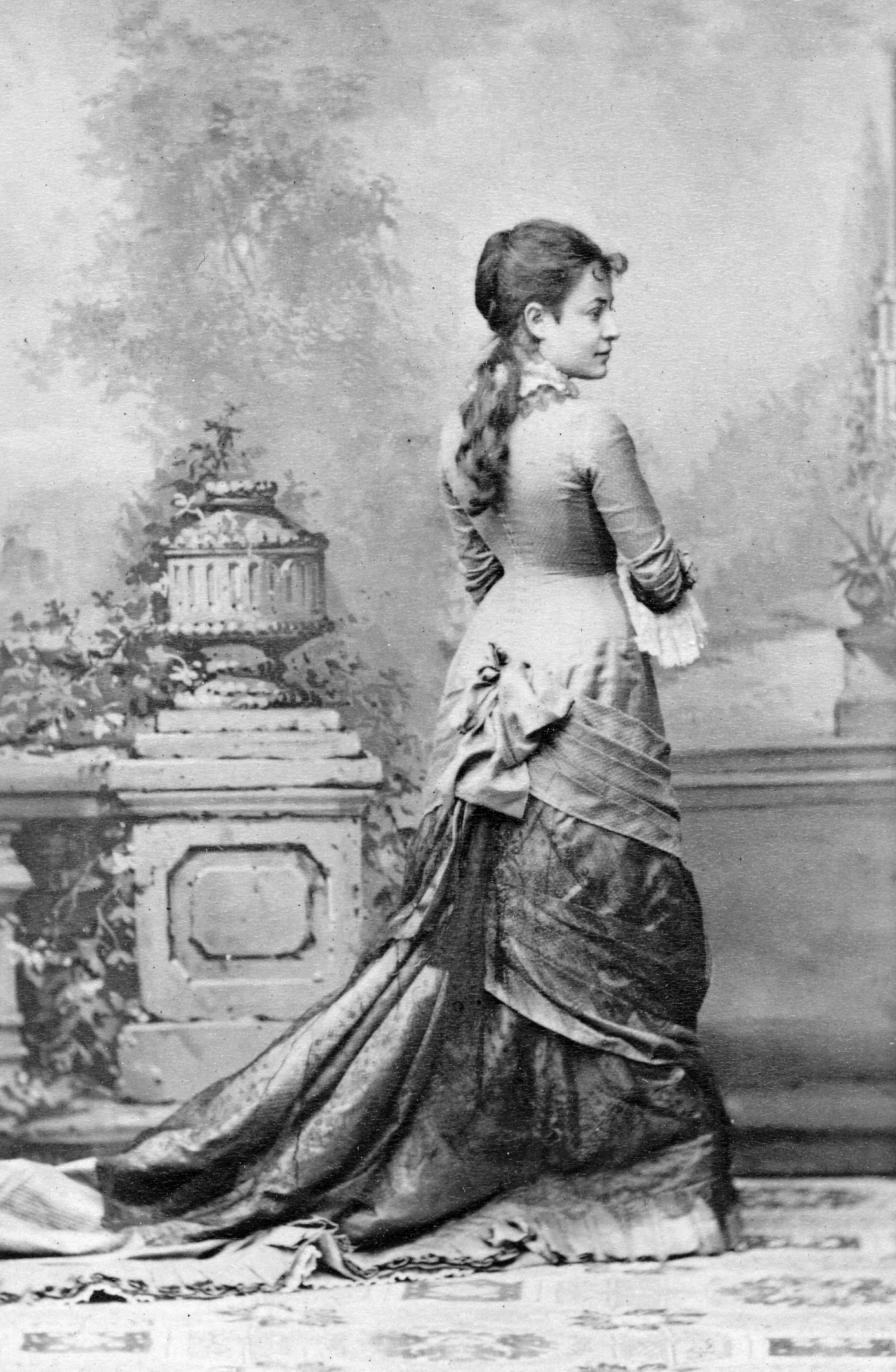
Ida Brander

Ida Brander (1857–1931), was a Finnish-Swedish stage actress.

Ida Brander was trained at the Royal Swedish Opera. She was engaged at the Swedish Theatre in Helsinki in 1877–1916, where she became one of the leading attractions of the theatre where she performed numerous roles.
