= Mimmi Lähteenoja =

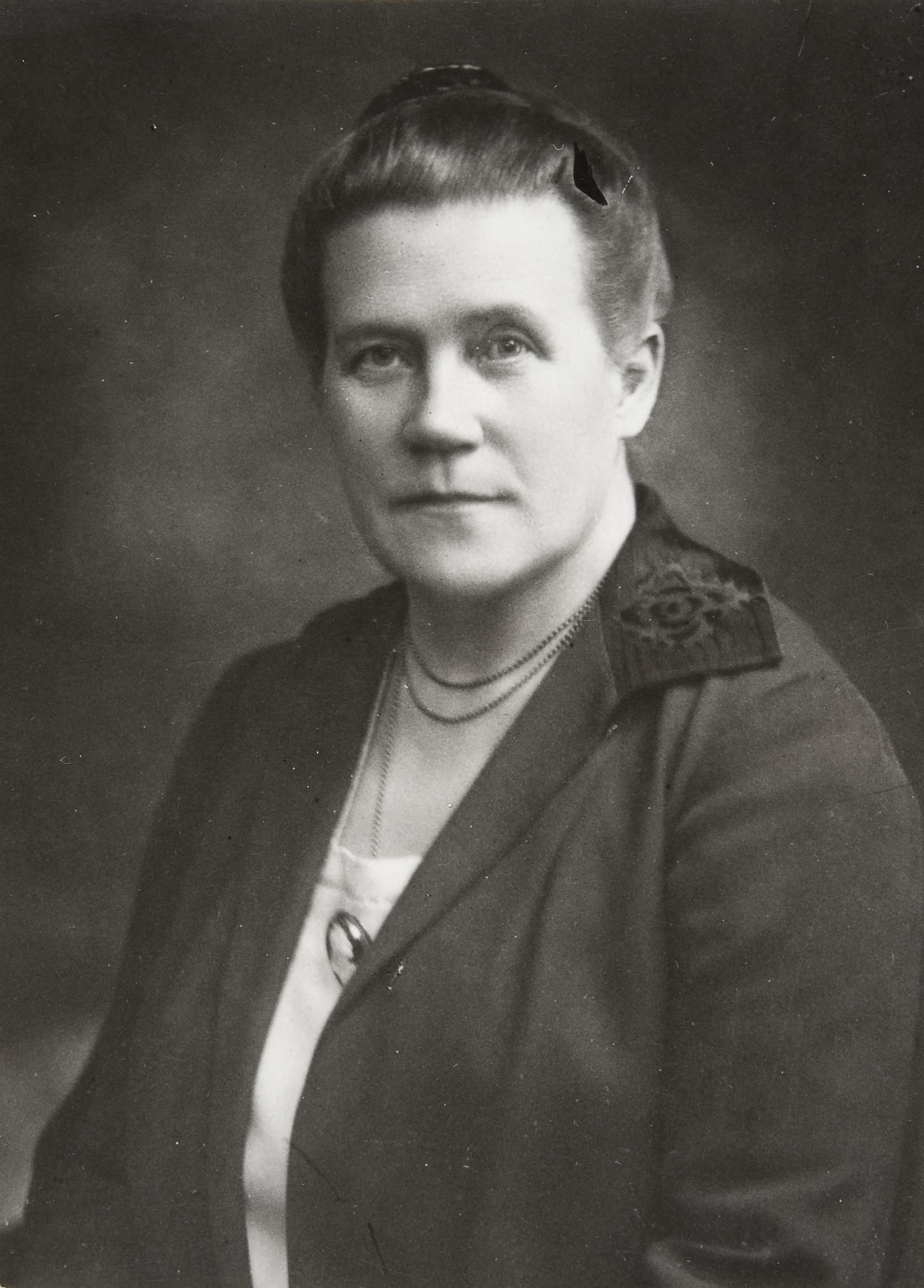
Mimmi Lähteenoja, 1920

Mimmi Lähteenoja (1865–1937) was a Finnish theatre and film actress known for her comic roles and roles of old hags.

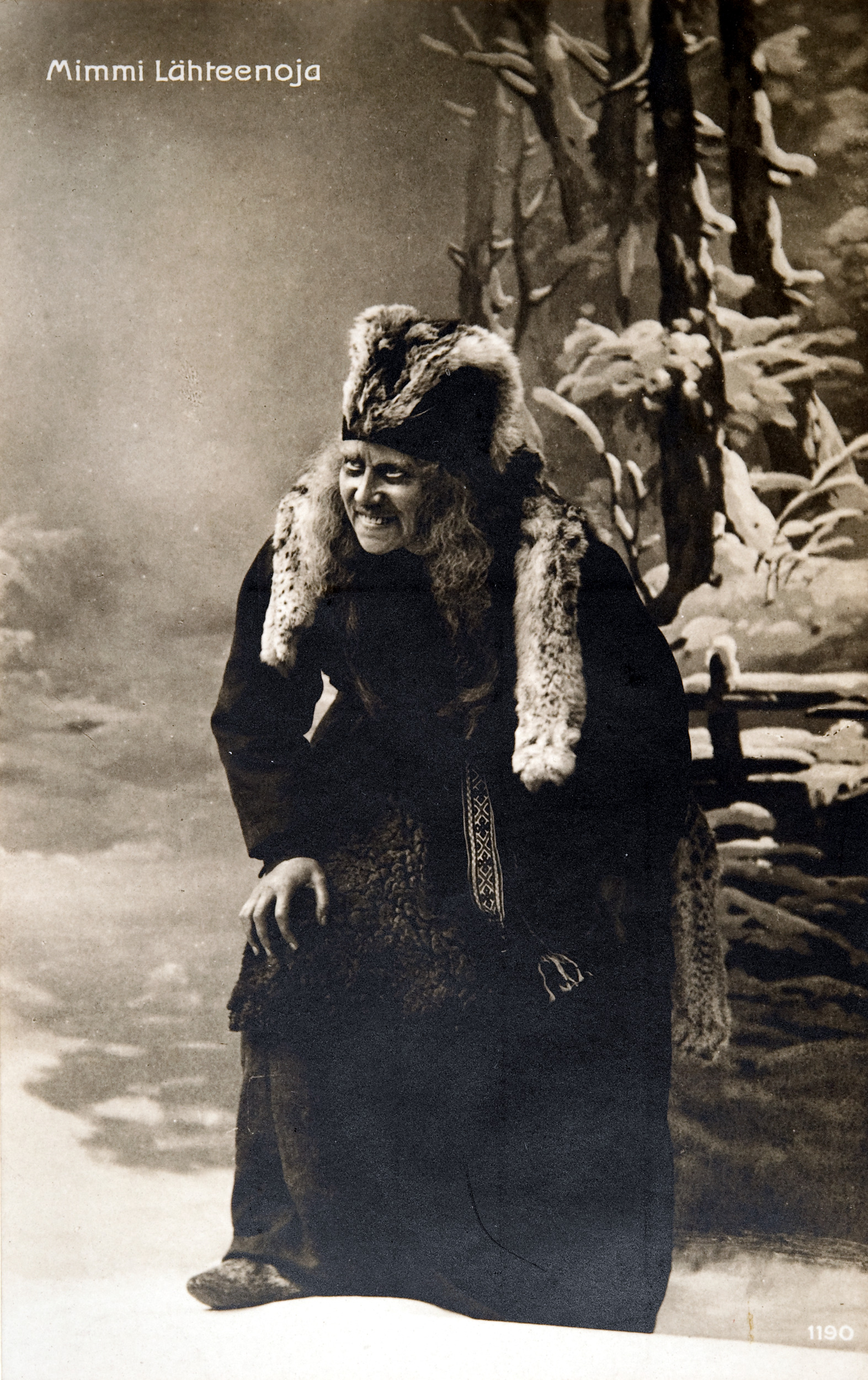
Mimmi Lähteenoja as Louhi, 1902

== Filmography ==
Her films are available online at the Elonet website with English subtitles.

- 1911: Anna-Liisa, silent drama film (not released, negative destroyed during a restoration attempt)
- 1922: Anna-Liisa, silent drama film
- 1932: Have I entered a harem?, comedy film
- 1933: Those 45,000, drama film with educational elements about tuberculosis
