= Risto Orko =

Finnish film producer and director

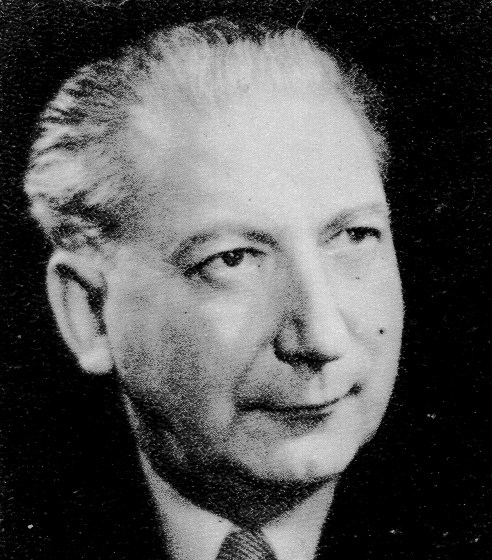
- Born: Risto Eliel William Nylund; 15 September 1899; Rauma, Finland
- Died: 29 September 2001 (aged 102); Helsinki, Finland
- Occupation(s): Film producer and director

Risto Orko (born Risto Eliel William Nylund; 15 September 1899 – 29 September 2001) was a Finnish film producer and director.

== Life and Career ==
Orko was born in Rauma. With a career of over 60 years at the film studio Suomi-Filmi, he rose to be head of production and chief director in the 1930s. He became its CEO in 1945. In the 1940s, 1950s and 1960s, Suomi-Filmi produced hundreds of films and numerous shorts. In the years 1933–43, Orko directed many films, including two (Aktivistit and Jääkärin morsian), which were banned for being "overly patriotic". He had a joint cooperation with the German film industry during World War II. Orko also directed a Finnish-Soviet co-production, released into the American market with subtitles, entitled The Day the Earth Froze in 1959.

== Death ==
His death in Helsinki, aged 102, was received with great sadness in his native Finland; thereafter he became known as the "last Finnish Film Tycoon".

== Selected filmography ==
- The Dead Man Falls in Love (1942)
- Sampo (1959)
- Onnelliset leikit (1964)
- The Headquarters (1970)
- Borrowing Matchsticks (1980)
