= In Adam's Dress and a Bit in Eve's Too (1971 film) =

- Finnish: Aatamin puvussa... ja vähän Eevankin
- Written by: Matti Kassila; Yrjö Soini
- Based on: Aatamin puvussa ja vähän Eevankin by Yrjö Soini
- Starring: Heikki Kinnunen; Juha Hyppönen
- Release date: 1971
- Running time: 88 minutes
- Country: Finland
- Language: Finnish

In Adam's Dress and a Bit in Eve's Too (Finnish: Aatamin puvussa... ja vähän Eevankin) is a 1971 Finnish comedy film directed and written by Matti Kassila, starring Heikki Kinnunen and Juha Hyppönen. The film is based on the novel Aatamin puvussa ja vähän Eevankin by Yrjö Soini. Its running time is 88 minutes.

== Cast ==
- Heikki Kinnunen as Heikki Himanen
- Juha Hyppönen as Jussi Kirves
- Marja-Leena Kouki as Marja
- Tuire Salenius as Tuire Korpela
- Kauko Helovirta as Police Chief Korpela
- Risto Mäkelä as Yrjö Granberg
- Pia Hattara as Selma
- Tiina Rinne as Salme
- Pentti Irjala as Hiski
- Tapio Hämäläinen as Constable Niemelä
- Eila Rinne as Kerttu Luodepohja
- Raili Veivo as Niemelä's Wife
- Ada Pääkkönen-Koponen as Farm Matron (as Ada Pääkkönen)
- Salme Karppinen as Tyyne
- Veijo Pasanen as Veijo Viirimäki

== See also ==
- Aatamin puvussa ja vähän Eevankin (1931)
- Aatamin puvussa ja vähän Eevankin (1940)
- Two Times Adam, One Time Eve (1959)
