= Urho Somersalmi =

Finnish actor (1888–1962)

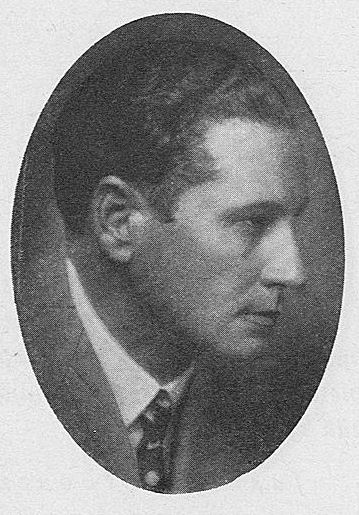
Somersalmi in the early 1930's

Urho Armas Somersalmi (formerly Urho Sundell; 23 September 1888, Helsinki – 12 April 1962) was a Finnish actor.

== Career ==
Somersalmi worked in the Finnish National Theatre from 1908 to 1958. He was often cast in the roles of masculine heroes or first-time lovers. His physical appearance was very suitable for such roles, and in the beginning of his career, he was often criticized for superficiality. Somersalmi was awarded the Pro Finlandia medal in 1948.

Somersalmi was involved in the Finnish film industry from the beginning. In 1913, he had his first small film role in a Teuvo Puro film Sylvi, the first Finnish drama film. His final appearance was in the Finnish-Soviet co-production film Sampo (1959) in which he played the role of Väinämöinen.

== Personal life ==
Somersalmi married actress Aili Somersalmi in 1912. In April 1962, he killed her with an axe he had received as a gift from Finnish Actors' Union and stabbed her in the chest, after which he hanged himself.

== Filmography ==
Year	Title	Role	Notes
1913	Sylvi		
1921	Johan	Stranger	
1927	His English Wife	Birger Holm, landowner	
1928	Tukkijoella	Aaprami Turkka	
1929	Työn sankarilaulu	Juhani Rauta	
1929	Juhla meren rannalla	Jyrki	
1930	Charlotte Löwensköld	Schagerström	
1931	Tukkipojan morsian	Erkki	
1936	Pohjalaisia	Kyösti	
1938	Jääkärin morsian	Franck	
1938	Karmankolon kuningas	Rosengren	
1940	Simo Hurtta		
1942	Oi, aika vanha, kultainen...!	Joonas Karhu	
1942	Avioliittoyhtiö	Professor Thorelius	
1944	Vaivaisukon morsian	Metsä-Olli	
1947	Pimeänpirtin hävitys	Aukusti	
1957	Risti ja liekki	Piispa	
1959	Sampo	Väinämöinen	(final film role)
