= Konrad Tallroth =

Finnish actor and film director

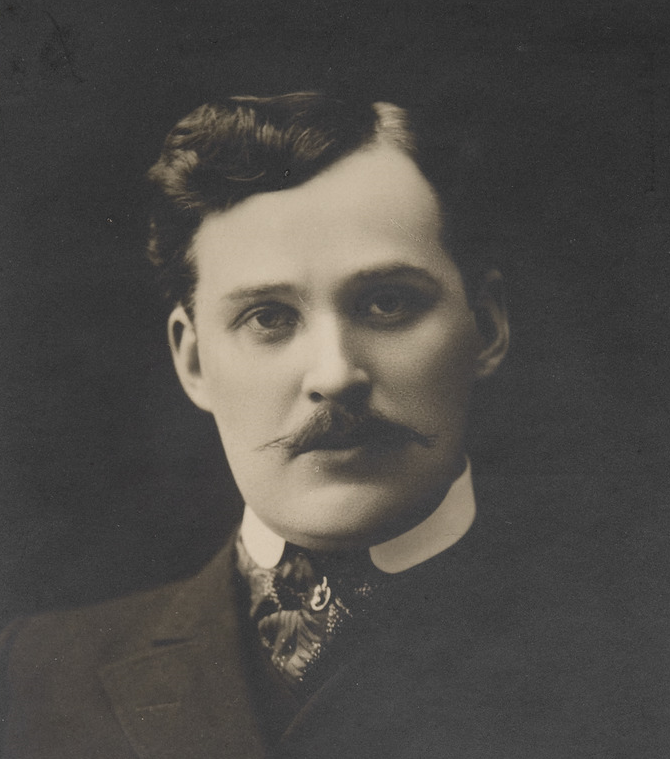
- Born: 12 November 1872; Nurmo, Finland
- Died: 27 January 1926 (aged 53); Helsinki, Finland
- Spouse: Ingeborg Tallroth

Konrad Tallroth (November 12, 1872 – January 27, 1926) was a Finnish actor, screenwriter, and director. He was a pioneering filmmaker in Finland.

In 1916 Tallroth worked six months for Svenska Biografteatern (later AB Svensk Filmindustri) in Lidingö, Sweden, where he directed eight films. Copies of two of these films survive.

== Filmography ==
- Rakkauden Kaikkivalta- Amor Omnia (1922)
- The Rapids-Rider's Brides (1923)
- Kesä (1915)
- Suursalon häät (1924)
- Miljonarvet (1917)
- The Village Shoemakers (1923)
- Skuggan av ett brott (1917)
- Chanson triste (1917)
- Vem sköt? (1917)
- Kun onni pettää (1913)
