= Helmi Lindelöf =

Finnish actress (1884–1966)

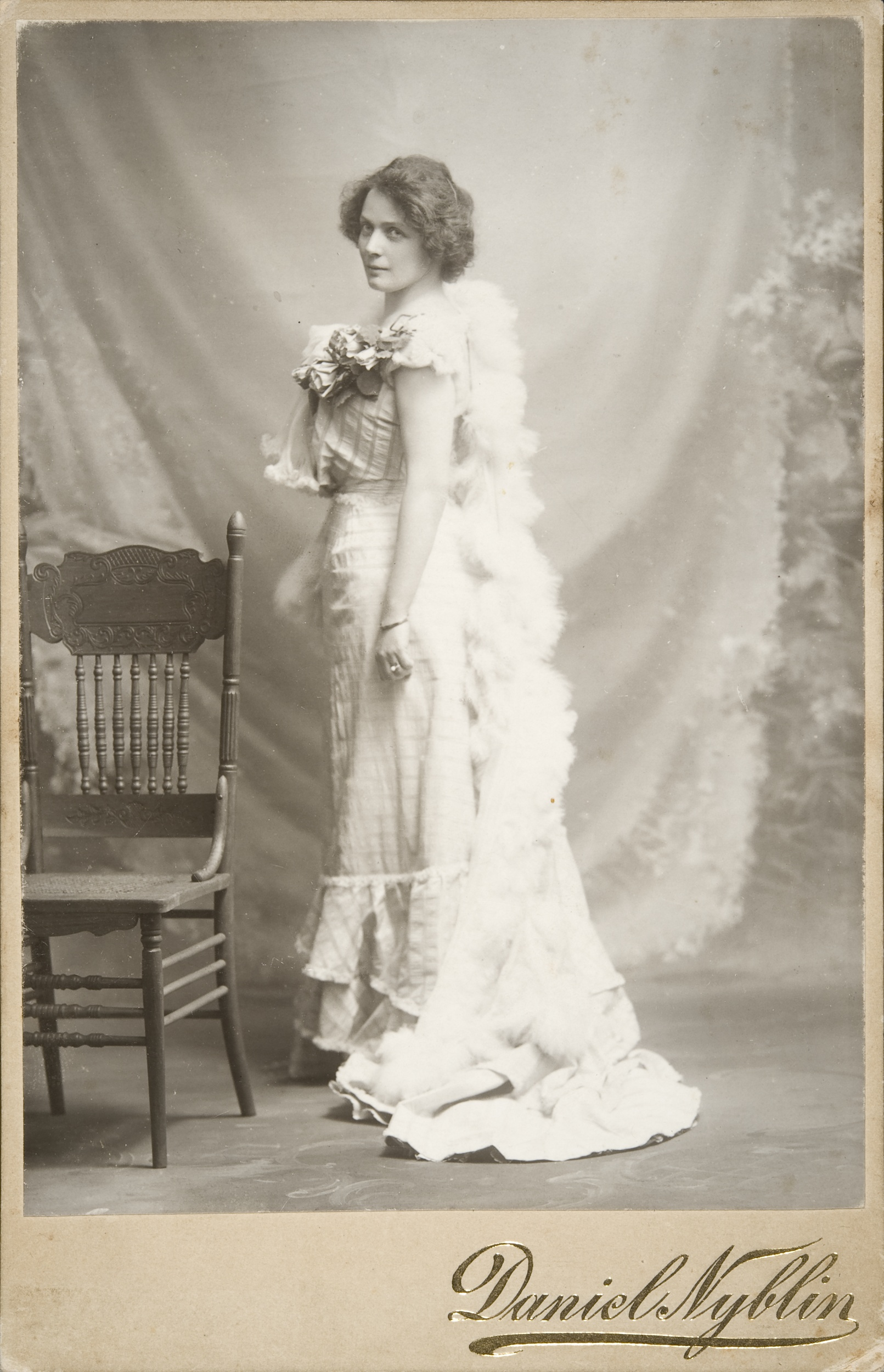
- Lindelöf, c. 1910s
- Born: Helmi Lydia Helenius; 25 October 1884; Helsinki, Grand Duchy of Finland
- Died: 10 September 1966 (aged 81); Helsinki, Finland
- Occupation: Actor
- Years active: 1901–1946
- Employer: Finnish National Theatre
- Awards: Pro Finlandia

Helmi Lydia Lindelöf (née Helenius; 1884–1966) was a leading Finnish actress of the first half of the 20th century.

== Career ==
Lindelöf's debut performance (under her maiden name Helenius) came in 1901 at the age of 17, and already the following year she was attached to the Finnish National Theatre, where she remained for the next 45 years.

Lindelöf was regarded as a versatile actor, with a repertoire ranging from classical roles to more modern character acting as well as comedy. She received both critical and popular acclaim for her meticulously prepared acting, regardless of whether she was playing a lead or supporting role.

She made study trips to Germany and France before WW I, and to France and Italy after the war.

Although mostly remembered as a stage actor, Lindelöf also performed in five films between the World Wars.

== Awards and recognition ==
In 1946, Lindelöf was awarded the Pro Finlandia medal of the Order of the Lion of Finland upon her retirement.

== Personal life ==
Helmi Helenius was born to the middle-class family of Enok and Ida (née Oxén) Helenius, later Heinilä.

In 1906, she married the Helsinki Philharmonic Orchestra's concertmaster Carl Lindelöf; the couple had three children.
