= Heikki Välisalmi =

Finnish journalist, writer, actor and politician (1886–1947)

Juho Heikki Välisalmi (11 April 1886 – 28 March 1947; name until 1906 Johan Henrik Karttunen) was a Finnish journalist, writer, actor and politician, born in Kuopio. He was a member of the Parliament of Finland from 1917 to 1918, representing the Social Democratic Party of Finland (SDP).
