= Erkki Karu =

Finnish film director, screenwriter and producer

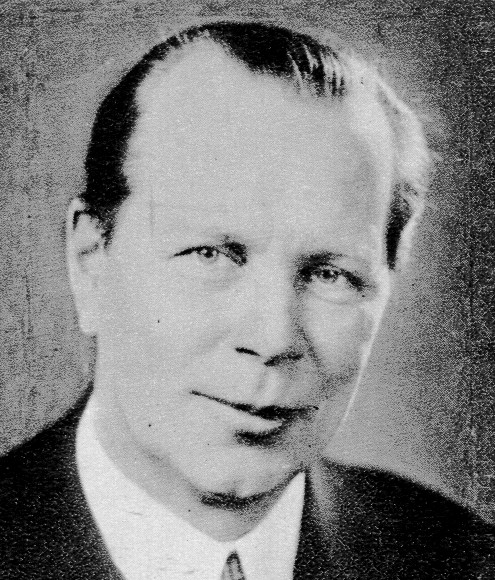
- Born: Erland Fredrik Kumlander; 10 April 1887; Helsinki, Finland
- Died: 8 December 1935 (aged 48); Helsinki, Finland
- Occupations: film director, screenwriter, producer
- Years active: 1919–1935
- Spouse: Elli Kylmänen
- Children: Olavi (1916–1992) and Sinikka (1917–1994)

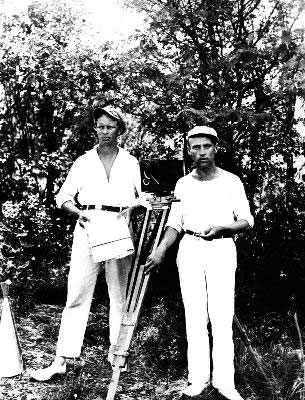
Erkki Karu (left) and Eino Kari in 1927.

Erkki Karu (born Erland Fredrik Kumlander) (10 April 1887 – 8 December 1935) was a Finnish film director, screenwriter and producer. He was one of the pioneers of the Finnish cinema.

== Career ==
Karu was born and died in Helsinki. He started his career as a member of a theater troupe in 1907. He became interested in cinema during the 1910s and was reportedly interested in starting his own film company as early as 1915. Karu dabbled in filmmaking, and directed, wrote, edited and produced the comedy short films Ylioppilas Pöllövaaran kihlaus and Sotagulashi Kaiun häiritty kesäloma for Suomen Biografi Oy, both of which were released in 1920.

Karu founded the film production company Suomi-Filmi in 1919, which by the end of the 1920s had grown into the largest company in its field in Finland. Karu not only worked as the CEO, but was also the head director for most of his stay in the company. Working to secure the finances of his company, Karu had to wait until 1922 before starting work on his feature-length debut, an adaptation of the Väinö Kataja novel Koskenlaskijan morsian, which saw its release on New Year's Day 1923. The film was a success, as was Karu's next work, the Aleksis Kivi adaptation Nummisuutarit, released in the same year. Because of both the popularity and artistic merit of these works, the year 1923 has been called the pinnacle of Karu's directing career. Throughout the rest of the decade and the early 1930s, Karu continued to direct popular films, such as Myrskyluodon kalastaja (1924), Suvinen satu (1925), Muurmanin pakolaiset (1927) and Nuori luotsi (1928). He remained the most successful director during the early years of Suomi-Filmi.

Suomi-Filmi ran into financial difficulties after the global depression stemming from the Wall Street crash of 1929 caused the attendance figures of cinemas to drop. Karu was accused of financial irresponsibility by the rest of the company's shareholders and in 1933 had to resign from the company he had started. After leaving Suomi-Filmi, Karu wasted no time, and only months later started what would become his old company's main rival, Suomen Filmiteollisuus. Karu had originally intended to start the company alongside an assistant director from Suomi-Filmi, Risto Orko, but Orko eventually chose to remain in Suomi-Filmi when he was offered the spot of head director. Instead, Karu found another partner, Toivo Särkkä, who himself would go on to become the most prolific director in not only Suomen Filmiteollisuus but the whole of Finland.

Karu held the title of head director in his new company, but during his short stay there could only direct two films, Syntipukki and Roinilan talossa, both in 1935, neither of which was very successful. He died unexpectedly on December 8, 1935.

== Family ==
Karu married Elli Kylmänen, at the end of 1915. The couple had two children, Olavi (1916–1992) and Sinikka (1917–1994).

== Filmography ==
- Ylioppilas Pöllövaaran kihlaus (1920)
- Sotagulashi Kaiun häiritty kesäloma (1920)
- Se parhaiten nauraa joka viimeksi nauraa (1921)
- Finlandia (1922)
- Koskenlaskijan morsian (1923)
- The Village Shoemakers (Nummisuutarit, 1923)
- Kun isällä on hammassärky (1923)
- Myrskyluodon kalastaja (1924)
- Suvinen satu (1925)
- Muurmannin pakolaiset (1927)
- Runoilija muuttaa (1927)
- Nuori luotsi (1928)
- Meidän poikamme (1929)
- Herra Elanto (1930)
- Tukkipojan morsian (1931)
- Meidän poikamme merellä (1933)
- Voi meitä! Anoppi tulee! (1933)
- Ne 45000 (1933)
- Meidän poikamme ilmassa – me maassa (1934)
- Syntipukki (1935)
- Roinilan talossa (1935)
- Onnenpotku (1936; posthumously completed by Glory Leppänen)
