= Glory Leppänen =

Finnish actress, director and writer (1901-1979)

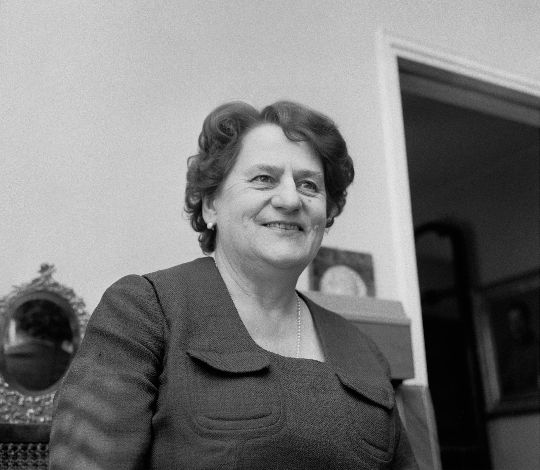
- Glory Leppänen in 1965
- Born: Glory Renvall; 28 November 1901; Paris, France
- Died: 26 October 1979 (aged 77); Helsinki, Finland
- Occupations: actress, director
- Spouse: Aarne Leppänen
- Parents: Heikki Renvall (father); Aino Ackté (mother)
- Relatives: Emmy Achté (grandmother)
- Awards: Pro Finlandia (1951)

Glory Leppänen (née Renvall; 28 November 1901 – 26 October 1979) was a Finnish actress, theatre and film director, and writer.

She was the first Finnish woman film director.

== Personal life ==
Glory Renvall was born in Paris to a wealthy Finnish family. Her mother was the internationally renowned operatic soprano Aino Ackté, and her father the lawyer, business executive and Senaattori (i.e. Minister) Heikki Renvall.

There have been persistent rumours that her biological father was the Finnish painter Albert Edelfelt, with whom her mother may have had an affair in Paris, but Glory Renvall herself has always insisted that her father is Heikki Renvall.

In 1924, Glory Renvall married the actor Aarne Leppänen, but he died in 1937 at a relatively young age of 43.

== Career ==
=== Stage ===
Glory Leppänen trained at Suomen Näyttämöopisto (lit. 'Finnish Stage College'), which later came to be merged into Helsinki Theatre Academy, graduating in 1922. She continued her studies in Europe, including at Regieseminar Max Reinhardt in Vienna.

Leppänen was attached to the Finnish National Theatre as an actor from 1922 to 1936.

After that, she moved into leadership roles, as Director of the municipal theatre companies of Turku (1936—1938), Vyborg (1938—1939), Pori (1940—1943), Tampere (1943—1949) and Helsinki (Helsingin Kansanteatteri) (1949—1957).

Leppänen also directed productions at the Finnish National Theatre and Opera of Finland (now Finnish National Opera). Her directorial work was heavily influenced by Reinhardt's philosophies.

=== Film ===
Leppänen appeared in three films in the 1920s and 1930s. She also directed one feature-length film, Onnenpotku (1936), starring the relatively inexperienced actress and Miss Europe 1934, Ester Toivonen. It was the first Finnish feature-length film directed by a woman, and as of 2020 remains the most successful such film by cinema audience numbers, with over 400,000 tickets sold.

=== Writing ===
In the 1960s, Leppänen published several adventure novels.

She also wrote a book each on her mother Aino Ackté, and grandmother Emmy Achté, as well as her own memoirs titled Elämäni Teatteria (1971) (lit. 'Theatre of My Life').

== Honours and awards ==
In 1951, Leppänen was awarded the Pro Finlandia medal of the Order of the Lion of Finland.
