= Yrjö Tuominen =

Finnish actor

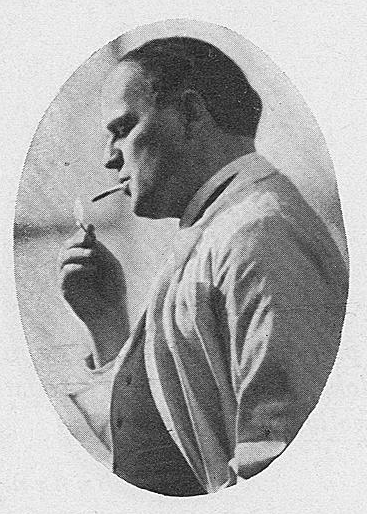
- Yrjö Tuominen smoking a cigarette in the late 1930s
- Born: April 20, 1892; Vaasa
- Died: October 13, 1946 (aged 54)

Yrjö Tuominen (April 20, 1892, in Vaasa – October 13, 1946) was a Finnish actor.

He studied at Tampere in the Swedish Technical College, and got a job in a Tampere linen factory as a machine draftsman. He started as an actor at the Tampere Workers' Theatre in 1919, then the Tampere Theatre. He then moved to the Helsinki theatre scene, where his future wife, Eine Laine, worked. At The National Theatre of Finland he developed a reputation as a fine character actor, and performed in roles as numerous Shakespearean characters such as King Lear.

Yrjö Tuominen is seen in more than 50 films. His movie career began in 1924, but it is his 1930s and 1940s films which he is best remembered for such as Tukkipojan morsian (1931), Aatamin puvussa ja vähän Eevankin (1931), Onnenpotku (1936), Pohjalaisia (1936), Asessorin naishuolet (1937), Seitsemän veljestä (1939), Kohtalo johtaa meitä (1943), and Katariina ja Munkkiniemen kreivi (1945). In the 1940s up to his death he usually played respectable folk such as vicars, professors or judges and other people of authority.
