= Suomi-Filmi =

Finnish film company

Suomi-Filmi, lit. Finland-Film, is a Finnish film production and distribution company established in 1919 by Erkki Karu. Suomi-Filmi produced around 160 feature-length films and for most of its history was one of the two most important film companies in the country, along with Suomen Filmiteollisuus. The company was home for several noted Finnish film directors, mainly its founder Erkki Karu, and the later two main directors Risto Orko and Valentin Vaala. After the 'Golden Age' of Finnish cinema ended, the company's film production rate slowed down, and eventually ended with the 1980 film Tulitikkuja lainaamassa. The company still exists, but is mainly only active in the home video distribution of their catalogue of titles.

== Early years ==
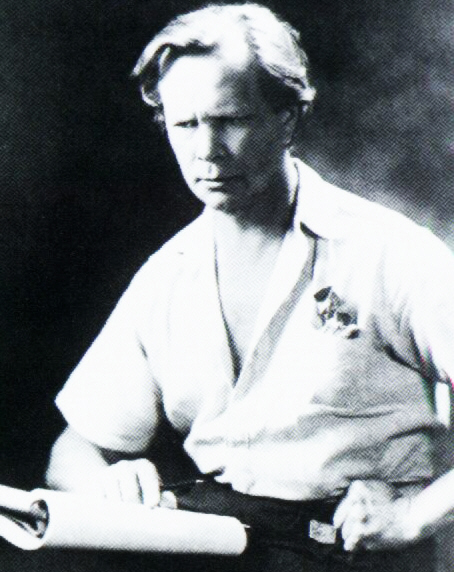
The founder of Suomi-Filmi, Erkki Karu

The company was founded as Suomen Filmikuvaamo on December 20, 1919, by Erkki Karu, but took its present name soon after, in 1921. Suomi-Filmi had a rocky start and took until May 1920 to complete its first short film, Vapaussodan päättymisen muistopäivä. Later on in the same year, the company released their first feature-length production, Ollin Oppivuodet, an adaptation of an Anni Swan novel directed by Teuvo Puro.

During his stay with the company, Karu worked not only as the CEO, but also as the head director of the company. While most of the other directors the company hired during the 1920s only worked on a few films and didn't enjoy significant success, Karu could create well-received films such as Koskenlaskijan morsian (1923) and the Aleksis Kivi adaptation The Village Shoemakers (Nummisuutarit, 1923). By the end of the silent film era, Suomi-Filmi was unquestionably the largest film production company in Finland, achieving almost a monopoly status.

In the early 1930s Suomi-Filmi ran into financial difficulties stemming from the global depression started by the Wall Street crash of 1929. While the 1920s had been largely successful for the company, yearly attendance figures dwindled countrywide, falling from over 12 million in 1928 to just over 6 million five years later. In 1933, after a falling out with the rest of the company's shareholders due to perceived financial irresponsibilities, Karu had to resign and was replaced as the CEO by Aarne Wuorenheimo. Only months later, however, Karu had founded another film company, Suomen Filmiteollisuus, which throughout much of its existence competed head-to-head as one of the two leading film companies in Finland along with Suomi-Filmi, although Karu himself died in 1935.

== After Karu ==
After the departure of Karu, Suomi-Filmi's future looked bleak. With their financial difficulties and lack of directing talent many expected the company to declare bankruptcy. However, Suomi-Filmi managed to avoid disaster by hiring promising young filmmaker Risto Orko as their chief director and head of production. Orko had previously worked as an assistant director for the company, but was expected to leave with Karu after aiding him in founding Suomen Filmiteollisuus. In the end, the confident Orko couldn't resist the chance of being the top man in the company, when leaving could've meant being always overshadowed by Karu. Orko ended up staying in the company for more than six decades, transitioning from directing to acting as the CEO from 1945 to 1976. From the 1970s to the early 1990s Orko was still the majority stockholder in the company (with the rest of the stocks being held by the rest of his family).

After his appointment Orko had to work hard and fast to re-invigorate the finances of Suomi-Filmi. During the 1930s and the early half of the 1940s Orko directed 13 films – a stark contrast with his later career, when he only directed three. The third film Orko directed, Siltalan pehtoori (1934), became a huge success, and the first Finnish film to reach a million viewers – in a country with a population of around three and a half million at the time. The film has been credited as saving Suomi-Filmi and returning it to a sound financial base.

In 1935, Suomi-Filmi hired another promising young director, Valentin Vaala, as their second main director. Vaala started his career with the company with Kaikki rakastavat (1935), a romantic comedy which brought Ansa Ikonen and Tauno Palo together on the screen for the first time. During his career with the company Vaala directed 39 films, among the most popular were Juurakon Hulda (1937), Niskavuoren naiset (1938), the two Mika Waltari adaptations Gabriel, tule takaisin (1951) and Omena putoaa... (1952), and Nummisuutarit (1957).

Other directors who worked for Suomi-Filmi during this period included Teuvo Tulio, who directed for example The Song of the Scarlet Flower (1938) based on the famous novel by Johannes Linnankoski, and Orvo Saarikivi, who directed among others Miehen Kylkiluu (1937) and Tottisalmen perillinen (1940). Saarikivi later on moved to Suomen Filmiteollisuus.

== 1940s-1950s ==
During the Winter War Suomi-Filmi's feature film production halted, while the company concentrated on mostly documentary short films. After the war the company's film production again proceeded rapidly, and when the Continuation War started, it only managed to slow down production a little, after an initial break. During the years 1940-1944 Suomi-Filmi produced 28 feature-length films.

The latter half of the 1940s were largely successful for Suomi-Filmi. Vaala remained active as the head director while Orko concentrated on the financial side of the company. During the 1950s, Suomi-Filmi's production rate started to slow down, but the company still remained one of the three largest film studios of the country, along with Suomen Filmiteollisuus and the upstart Fennada-Filmi. The other main directors working for the company during the time were Ilmari Unho, who finished among others Kalle-Kustaan Korkin seikkailut (1949) and Härmästä poikia kymmenen (1950). Hannu Leminen was hired away from Suomen Filmiteollisuus and he directed several films during the 1950s, such as Kesäillan valssi (1951) and Riihalan valtias (1956).

== Decline ==
While Suomi-Filmi remained somewhat active in producing films, by the 1960s the popularity of their pictures had started to wane. During the 1970s the company only produced two films of their own, but still remained active in film distribution for both domestic and foreign films until the early 1980s. Suomi-Filmi's final production was the Soviet co-production, Tulitikkuja lainaamassa (Za spichkami) in 1980. Later on, the company has still remained visible in the home video distribution of its extensive film catalogue.

== Influence ==
During its heyday, Suomi-Filmi had, at one time or another, employed most of the major Finnish actors and creative filmmaking personnel of the time. It was therefore largely responsible for shaping the 'Golden Age' of Finnish cinema, along with their major competitor Suomen Filmiteollisuus, and that influence has reached even past the end of Suomi-Filmi's own production activities. Many of the films produced by the company are still regarded as classics of contemporary Finnish cinema.
