= List of Finnish films of the 1940s =

A list of films produced in Finland ordered by year of release. For an alphabetical list of Finnish films see Category:Finnish films

Title	Director	Cast	Genre	Notes
1940
Aatamin puvussa ja vähän Eevankin	Ossi Elstelä	Sirkka Sipilä, Tauno Palo	Comedy	
In the Fields of Dreams	Teuvo Tulio	Sirkka Salonen, Olga Tainio, Kaarlo Oksanen	Drama	
One Man's Fate	Hugo Hytönen and Nyrki Tapiovaara	Gunnar Hiilloskorpi, Mirjami Kuosmanen, Hugo Hytönen	Drama	
SF-paraati	Yrjö Norta	Tauno Palo, Ansa Ikonen	Musical	IMDb
1941
Onnellinen ministeri	T.J. Särkkä	Birgit Kronström, Tauno Palo, Toppo Elonperä	Comedy	IMDb
Viimeinen vieras	Ville Salminen, Arvi Tuomi	Ville Salminen, Irma Seikkula	Crime, Thriller	IMDb
1942
The Dead Man Falls in Love	Ilmari Unho	Joel Rinne, Tauno Majuri, Tauno Majuri	Comedy thriller	
1943
Katariina ja Munkkiniemen kreivi	Ossi Elstelä	Regina Linnanheimo, Leif Wager, Elsa Rantalainen	Drama	
1944
The Dead Man Loses His Temper	Ilmari Unho	Joel Rinne, Regina Linnanheimo, Kaija Rahola	Comedy thriller	
Woman is the Wild Card	Ansa Ikonen	Ansa Ikonen, Aku Korhonen, Uuno Laakso	Comedy	
1945
Linnaisten vihreä kamari	Valentin Vaala	Rauli Tuomi, Regina Linnanheimo, Kaija Rahola	Comedy, Horror	
Soot and Gold	Edvin Laine	Edvin Laine, Ansa Ikonen, Veli-Matti Kaitala	Drama	
1946
Cross of Love	Teuvo Tulio	Regina Linnanheimo, Oscar Tengström and Ville Salminen	Drama	
Golden Light	Edvin Laine	Edvin Laine, Mirjam Novero, Rauha Puntti	Drama	
Light Melody	Edvin Laine	Kalle Ruusunen, Veli-Matti Kaitala, Ruth Luoma-aho	Comedy, drama	
Oroligt blod	Teuvo Tulio	Regina Linnanheimo, Harriett Philipson, Hans Strååt	Drama	
Restless Blood	Teuvo Tulio	Regina Linnanheimo, Eino Katajavuori, Toini Vartiainen	Drama	
1947
Koskenkylän laulu	Ilmari Unho	Tauno Palo, Hilkka Helinä, Kirsti Ortola	Drama	
North Express	Roland af Hällström	Ansa Ikonen, Leif Wager, Tauno Majuri	Thriller	
Olof – forsfararen	Teuvo Tulio	Regina Linnanheimo, Kullervo Kalske, Eric Gustafson	Drama	
Tree Without Fruit	Hannu Leminen	Helena Kara, Rauli Tuomi, Joel Rinne	Drama	
1948
Haaviston Leeni	Ville Salminen	Ghedi Lönnberg, Rauli Tuomi	Drama	IMDb
Ihmiset suviyössä	Valentin Vaala	Eila Pehkonen, Matti Oravisto, Martti Katajisto	Drama	
1949
Aaltoska orkaniseeraa (Mrs. Aaltonen organises)	Edvin Laine	Joel Asikainen, Matti Aulos	Comedy	
