= It Began in the Rain =

1953 Finnish film

- Original Finnish film poster
- Finnish: Se alkoi sateessa
- Directed by: Thure Bahne; Eddie Stenberg
- Written by: Elsa Soini
- Based on: Pikku seikkailu by Elsa Soini
- Produced by: T.J. Särkkä
- Starring: Eila Peitsalo; Tauno Palo; Kaarlo Halttunen
- Cinematography: Pentti Unho
- Edited by: Elmer Lahti
- Music by: Harry Bergström
- Production company: Suomen Filmiteollisuus
- Distributed by: Suomen Filmiteollisuus
- Release date: 28 August 1953
- Running time: 79 minutes
- Country: Finland
- Language: Finnish

It Began in the Rain (Finnish: Se alkoi sateessa) is a 1953 Finnish comedy thriller film directed by Thure Bahne and Eddie Stenberg and starring Eila Peitsalo, Tauno Palo and Kaarlo Halttunen. The film's sets were designed by Aarre Koivisto. It is based on the 1943 play Pikku seikkailu (lit. 'Little adventure') by Elsa Soini.

The production of the film was problematic. Eddie Stenberg was originally hired to direct the film, but in the middle of production the director was changed to Thure Bahne. It is known that producer T. J. Särkkä was also involved in completing the direction of the film. Särkkä later stated in his own words, that the film turned out to be "damn bad". In the evaluations of contemporary critics, it was generally stated that the change of makers has affected the final result of the film, and later in connection with the film's television premiere, it was assessed that "nothing works in the film, not the drama, not the characters, not to mention the directing."

== Plot ==
The plot of the film is based on a misunderstanding. In a storm, a woman named Vuokko hits the smugglers' warehouse, where she meets the man she thinks is their boss. Through adventures, they finally end up at the altar, even though Vuokko has not known the man's true identity.

== Cast ==
- Eila Peitsalo as Vuokko Takala
- Tauno Palo as Captain Kalervo Karhi
- Kaarlo Halttunen as Vuokko's uncle - Rural police chief
- Annikki Arni
- Matti Aulos as Pastor
- Thure Bahne as Director
- Greta Brotherus as herself
- Mauno Enroth
- Tyyne Haarla as Woman waiting for an elevator
- Eva Hellas as Film star
- Paavo Hukkinen as Station manager
- Mauno Hyvönen
- Ekke Hämäläinen
- Kurt Ingvall
- Pentti Irjala as Police officer
- Kalevi Kahra as Soldier
- Eino Kaipainen as Chief Constable
- Heikki Kalliokoski as Shadowing police officer
- Aarno Karhilo as himself
- Heikki Kataja as himself
- Kaisa Kivitie as herself
- Valma Kivitie as herself
- Kauko Kokkonen as Rompan Eetu
- Keijo Komppa as Smuggler
- Arvo Kuusla as Police officer
- Toivo Lahti as Gentleman
- Varma Lahtinen as Kiosk vendor
- Kauno Laine as Film crew member
- Lennart Lauramaa as Police officer
- Kauko Laurikainen as Police officer
- Matti Lehtelä as Inspector
- Heimo Lepistö as Lieutenant
- Leevi Linko as Cop
- Veikko Linna as Gentleman
- Esko Mannermaa as Soldier
- Uuno Montonen as Rural police chief of Hyrylä
- Leo Nordberg as himself
- Otto Noro as man in the train
- Matti Oravisto as Film star
- Esa Pakarinen as Third Mister
- Martti Romppanen as Soldier
- Vilho Ruuskanen as Station manager
- Helmer Salmi as Antti
- Mikko Sergejeff as Cinematographer
- Paula Talaskivi as herself
- Aimo Tepponen
- Hannes Veivo as Cop
- Pentti Viljanen as Farmer of Mattila
- Urho Westman as Newspaper vendor
- Eddie Stenberg as Liikkuva kylpyamme

== Bibliography ==
- Qvist, Per Olov & von Bagh, Peter. Guide to the Cinema of Sweden and Finland. Greenwood Publishing Group, 2000.
