= The Radio Goes Insane =

- Original Finnish film poster
- Finnish: Radio tulee hulluksi
- Directed by: Matti Kassila
- Written by: Matti Kassila; Aarne Tarkas
- Produced by: Teuvo Tulio
- Starring: Hannes Häyrinen; Ritva Arvelo; Uljas Kandolin; Kaarlo Halttunen
- Cinematography: Osmo Harkimo
- Edited by: Teuvo Tulio
- Music by: Tauno Marttinen
- Release date: 1952
- Running time: 95 mins
- Country: Finland
- Language: Finnish

The Radio Goes Insane or The Radio Goes Mad (Finnish: Radio tulee hulluksi) is a 1952 Finnish comedy film directed by Matti Kassila. The film is a sequel to The Radio Burglary, again starring Hannes Häyrinen as radio reporter Toivo Teräsvuori. Teräsvuori is mistakenly committed to a mental hospital and attempts to escape.

== Plot ==
The ambitious radio reporter Toivo Teräsvuori (Hannes Häyrinen) is disappointed when ordered to report on an agricultural show in Mäntsälä. He convinces his superior to let him report using a hidden microphone to gauge people's reactions on being asked outlandish questions. Things start to go wrong when the police are informed of the apparently incoherent reporter who also appears to be talking to himself. The police come to the conclusion that Teräsvuori must be insane and he is committed to Houruniemen Mental Hospital. Testimony from his wife, Eila (Ritva Arvelo), only confirms their diagnosis. Despite being detained at the mental hospital, Teräsvuori continues to make light of the situation, only becoming alarmed when the doctors there concur in the verdict regarding his mental health. Faced with the prospect of uncomfortable tests and treatments, he starts looking for a way to escape.

== Cast ==
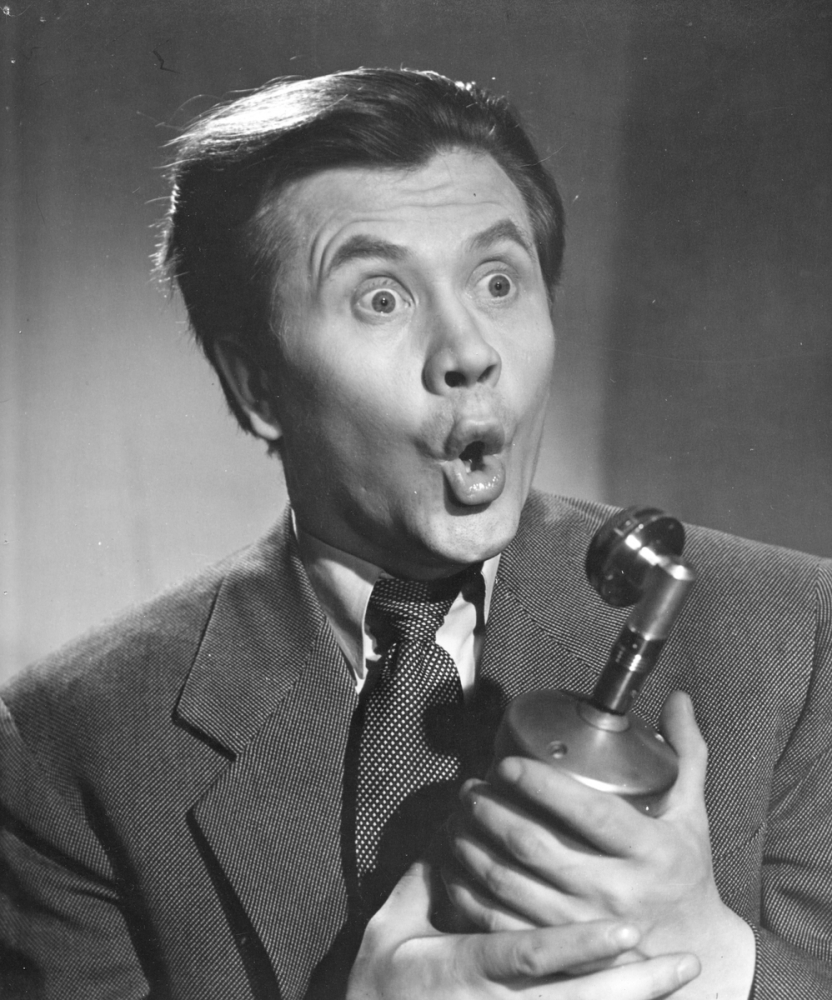
Hannes Häyrinen as Toivo "Topi" Teräsvuori

- Hannes Häyrinen as Toivo "Topi" Teräsvuori
- Ritva Arvelo as Eila Teräsvuori
- Uljas Kandolin as Nurse Tillikka
- Kaarlo Halttunen as Sound engineer Leo Laakso
- Arvo Lehesmaa as Professor "Appe" Piukka
- Unto Salminen ad Doctor Kirves

== Production ==
The film was shot primarily in Helsinki during 1951. Interior shots of the mental hospital were allegedly from Merikasarmi Laivastakatu 22. Exterior shots of the hospital came from Koskela Municipal building. Other exterior shot locations include the current Supreme Administrative Court building (Fabianinkatu 15) and Kappeli.

Although The Radio Burglary had been produced through Suomen Filmiteollisuus, Kassila had become frustrated with working with the studio. Instead, Kassilia, Aarne Tarkas, and Osmo Harkimo founded Junior-Filmi, an independent production company, and began filming The Radio Goes Insane. Junior-Filmi did not have enough resources to independently fund filming, and thus relied greatly on Teuvo Tulio, who provided equipment and financing for the film. The Radio Goes Insane is the only film produced by Tulio which he did not direct. Although their partnership with Tulio was productive, they came into conflict over sharing the film's revenue. According to Kassila, Tulio entirely withheld the film's proceeds from him and his partners. Tulio refused to sell the television rights, and the film did not air on television until after his death when film rights passed to the Finnish Film Archive. Although the film had its theatrical premiere in 1952, its television debut came on 5 June 2007.

== Reception ==
The film premiered on 1 February 1952 in Tampere. Some critics saw the film as a forced sequel, carrying on the success of The Radio Burglary, though others praised the film for expanding on the satire its predecessor. The Radio Goes Mad became successful in its own right, but did not match the unequivocal critical popularity of The Radio Burglary. The film was also criticised for its glib depiction of mental health institutions at a time of psychiatric reform.
