= Jealousy (1953 Finnish film) =

1953 film by Teuvo Tulio

- Directed by: Teuvo Tulio
- Written by: Nisse Hirn
- Produced by: Teuvo Tulio
- Starring: Regina Linnanheimo; Eero Paganus; Assi Raine
- Cinematography: Erkki Imberg; Veikko Laakso
- Edited by: Teuvo Tulio
- Music by: Tauno Marttinen
- Release date: 13 January 1953
- Running time: 93 minutes
- Country: Finland
- Language: Finnish

Jealousy (Finnish: Mustasukkaisuus) is a 1953 Finnish drama film, directed by Teuvo Tulio and starring Regina Linnanheimo, Eero Paganus and Assi Raine. It was a remake of Restless Blood (1946). The film was shot in parallel with the Swedish-language version Två kvinnor.

== Cast ==
- Regina Linnanheimo as Riitta Maras
- Eero Paganus as Jyri Maras
- Assi Raine as Anja
- Annie Mörk as Grandmother
- Paavo Jännes as Doctor
- Lauri Korpela as Owner of the sawmill
- Kyösti Erämaa as Inspector
- Onni Hannukainen as Jacklighter
- F.E. Sillanpää as Man at the dances
- Helvi Järveläinen as Woman at the dances

== Bibliography ==
- Pietari Kääpä. Directory of World Cinema: Finland. Intellect Books, 2012.
