= Olof – forsfararen =

Swedish-language Finnish drama film

- Directed by: Teuvo Tulio
- Written by: Nisse Hirn
- Produced by: Teuvo Tulio
- Starring: Regina Linnanheimo; Kullervo Kalske; Eric Gustafson
- Cinematography: Osmo Harkimo
- Music by: Tauno Marttinen
- Release date: 1947
- Country: Finland
- Language: Swedish

Olof – forsfararen is a 1947 Swedish-language Finnish drama film directed by Teuvo Tulio and starring Regina Linnanheimo, Kullervo Kalske and Eric Gustafson. It is based on a short story by Johannes Linnankoski. The film was shot in parallel with the Finnish-language version Intohimon vallassa.

== Cast ==
- Regina Linnanheimo as Britta Stor-Övergård
- Kullervo Kalske as Olof
- Eric Gustafson as Paul Stor-Övergård
- Aku Peltonen as farm-worker
- Elli Ylimaa as Anderssonskan
- Oscar Tengström as Britta's father
- Kaija Suonio as Britta's mother
