= The General's Fiancée =

- Directed by: Ville Salminen
- Written by: Toivo Kauppinen (play); Ville Salminen
- Produced by: T.J. Särkkä
- Starring: Sakari Halonen; Leena Häkinen
- Cinematography: Osmo Harkimo; Kauno Laine
- Edited by: Armas Vallasvuo
- Music by: Harry Bergström
- Production company: Suomen Filmiteollisuus
- Distributed by: Suomen Filmiteollisuus
- Release date: 29 June 1951
- Running time: 66 minutes
- Country: Finland
- Language: Finnish

The General's Fiancée (Finnish: Kenraalin morsian) is a 1951 Finnish comedy film directed by Ville Salminen and starring Sakari Halonen and Leena Häkinen.

== Cast ==
- Sakari Halonen as Pvt. Taavetti Hurskainen
- Leena Häkinen as Kaisa
- Eija Inkeri as Helena
- Eino Kaipainen as Major-general Anton Narva
- Kullervo Kalske as Captain Saarto
- Ruth Luoma-Aho as Irma Saarto
- William Markus as Lieutenant Olavi Naula
- Lasse Pöysti as Lance corporal Oksapää
- Irja Ranin as Elli
- Elsa Turakainen as Sofia Tissari
- Armas Jokio as Tunnistamaton rooli

== Bibliography ==
- Qvist, Per Olov & von Bagh, Peter. Guide to the Cinema of Sweden and Finland. Greenwood Publishing Group, 2000.
