= Vihtori ja Klaara =

1939 film by Teuvo Tulio

- Directed by: Teuvo Tulio
- Based on: Bringing Up Father by George McManus
- Starring: Eino Jurkka; Verna Piponius
- Release date: 1939
- Running time: 99 minutes
- Country: Finland
- Language: Finnish

Vihtori ja Klaara (Finnish for "Vihtori and Klaara") is a 1939 Finnish comedy film. It was the only comedy film directed by Teuvo Tulio and his second oldest film to survive in its entirety. The film tells the story about Vihtori's henpecked life with his temperamental wife Klaara. This farcical marriage story is punctuated with numerous misunderstandings.

The film is based on the American comic strip Bringing Up Father, which was translated to Finnish as Vihtori ja Klaara.

== History ==
The newspaper Uusi Suomi started publishing George McManus's strip in 1929. The strip was such a success in Finland that "Vihtori" became a synonym for a henpecked husband. Tatu Pekkarinen started writing plays based on the strip in the early 1930s. Eino Jurkka played Vihtori both on the scene and in four films.

The principal reason for filming Vihtori ja Klaara was a lack of money. In spring 1939 Tulio had made an agreement about making a film with a Swedish producer. He had rented filming equipment and hired a staff for the film, when it became apparent that the producer had not made an agreement about filming rights for the script. Eino Jurkka came to Tulio's rescue and suggested a film about Vihtori ja Klaara to him. Jurkka had played a Vihtori-type character in Valentin Vaala's 1935 film Kun isä tahtoo... Tulio took the setting and plot for his film almost directly from Vaala's film. The script was made by Tulio, Jurkka and Turo Kartto who played Nisse.

The film was shot in Helsinki in early summer 1939. The outdoor scenes were mostly shot in Töölö, for example on Välskärinkatu in Taka-Töölö. Some scenes were also shot on Hallituskatu in Kluuvi. The studio was set up at the Youth society house in Vanhakaupunki.

Only one copy of the film survives to this day, and even that one has suffered damages.

== Plot ==
Vihtori Vuorenkaiku (based on the character Jiggs) is a newly-rich former working-class man. His wife Klaara (based on the character Maggie) wants to live a life typical of her "new standing", including visits to the opera. Vihtori is not interested in such matters. However, Klaara's behaviour is not very typical of her "new standing": when she gets angry, she throws things like pots and plates at her husband. The following day Vihtori, having skipped a visit to the opera, has a telephone conversation with his "darling" Ritva Vuorenrinne. At the same time Klaara telephones her husband and announces she wants to open a cosmetics shop. Her daughter Vappu visits Vihtori's office and announces she will marry Petteri. Vihtori considers Petteri a poor choice for a son-in-law but Klaara warms up to the idea when she hears Petteri's surname carries a "von" prefix. At night, Vihtori has a vivid dream where Klaara chases him with a rolling pin in her hand through the streets of Helsinki.

The next day is full of various mishaps concerning jewellery. Vihtori buys an expensive piece of jewellery as a nameday gift for Ritva, which he forgets to pay for in his hurry. The jewellery ends up in the hands of Klaara, who is impressed that her husband remembered her nameday; Klaara's middle name is Ritva. Vappu and Petteri end up in trouble with the police when speeding on a public road. Vihtori too ends up at the police station because of the unpaid jewellery. He clears the matter up with the manager of the jewellery shop. Klaara learns about the relationship between Vihtori and Ritva and storms into Ritva's apartment where Petteri and Vihtori are hiding under the bed. Petteri bravely comes out of hiding, causing Klaara to think he has a relationship with Ritva. Vappu breaks down upon hearing of Petteri's alleged treachery. In the meantime, Vihtori has started considering Petteri a good choice for a husband to Vappu.

Ritva convinces Klaara and Vappu that Petteri is innocent. She also sells her cosmetics store to Klaara as she is marrying her fiancé Klasu and moving away from Finland. Vihtori, who has already bought the cosmetics shop to Ritva, ends up having to buy it for a second time to Klaara. Petteri and Ritva decide to teach Vappu a lesson. They agree that Petteri feigns indifference towards Vappu, but only for a moment. Soon Petteri and Vappu are happy together again. Vihtori ends up in hospital when Klaara drops a large pot on his head. Vihtori is in no hurry back home from hospital. He receives a letter and a wedding photograph from Ritva. Klaara also reads the letter and learns that Ritva Vuorenrinne is Vihtori's daughter. She is moved by this information and wonders why Vihtori did not tell her the truth about Ritva earlier.

== Cast ==
Eino Jurkka	Vihtori Vuorenkaiku ("Jiggs")
Verna Piponius	Klaara Ritva Vuorenkaiku ("Maggie")
Turo Kartto	Nisse Vuorenkaiku, 30 years old
Nora Mäkinen	Vappu Vuorenkaiku
Leo Lähteenmäki	engineer Petteri von Schaslick
Kirsti Hurme	Ritva Vuorenkaiku alias Ritva Vuorenrinne
Tauno Majuri	Klasu Tullari
Aku Peltonen	Topi Tullari, bartender
Einari Ketola	policeman
Elvi Saarnio	Ritva's maid
Evald Terho	Vihtori's friend
Jokke Liebkind	drunken billiards player
Lida Salin	fiancée of billiards player
Rauha Rentola	nurse

== Notes ==
According to Kimmo Laine, Vihtori ja Klaara is a classical farce. Tulio takes the "comic book style" to great lengths with noticeable optical transfers. The acting style, expressions and gestures are exaggerated even from a farcical point of view. According to Laine, the cropping and the scenery-like posing scenes carry a special weight.

== Reception ==
Vihtori ja Klaara enjoyed a moderate success in the 1939 Finnish countryside. The film performed more poorly in Helsinki. It was shown as the inaugural film for the new Jyväs-Kino film theatre in Jyväskylä.

Contemporary critics received the film harshly. The critic for Uusi Suomi writes: "The director Teuvo Tulio moves in light frames at this time -- He hardly believes himself he can be taken quite seriously", while Karjala writes: "The amusement quality of this farce is mainly at a level where one could say 'Yes this is funny but it hardly makes you laugh' - the tricks are so elementary." The acting was seen as adequate.

The film was first shown on television in 1976. Critics had a more pleasant opinion about the 1983 television broadcast of the film. The critic for Uusi Suomi writes: "...as an image user and a utiliser of pure cinematographic means Tulio was in the 1930s years, maybe even decades ahead of his colleagues in the field of domestic film." Arto Pajukallio also had a favourable opinion of the film in 2012, saying that Tulio represents "a way of cinematographic thinking favourably standing out from the general appearance of the contemporary domestic comedies". According to him Tulio has captured not only the spirit of urban life, but also that of the original comic strip.

Finnkino has republished the film on DVD.
