= Hannes Häyrinen =

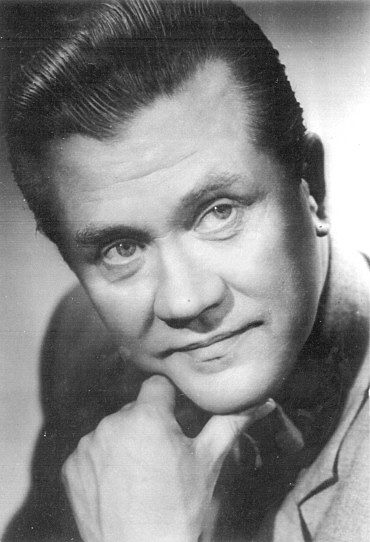
Häyrinen in 1961

Hannes "Hanski" Häyrinen (originally Johan Erik Högdahl, 25 April 1914 − 21 December 1991) was a Finnish actor, film director, screenwriter and theatre manager.

== Theatrical career ==
Hannes Häyrinen worked for several theatres during his career. From 1937 to 1939 he worked in Helsinki, and then in Kotka, Tampere and Lahti. In addition to acting, he also served as a theatre manager in Kotka City Theatre. Häyrinen became a freelance actor in 1957 and returned to Helsinki. He worked for Helsinki City Theatre from 1959 until 1975 when he was signed to the Finnish National Theatre. There he remained until his retirement in 1981.

== Film career ==
Häyrinen was also a noted actor in films. He made memorable appearances in such films as Hätävara (1939), Rikas tyttö (1939) and Viimeinen vieras (1941) which was his first film as a leading actor. One of Häyrinen's best remembered performances is the role of a radio reporter Toivo Teräsvuori in a Matti Kassila film Radio tekee murron (1952). He also appeared in the sequel, Radio tulee hulluksi (1952). During his career, Häyrinen directed only one film, Iskelmäketju (1959).

== Television and radio ==
Hannes Häyrinen appeared in television since the early 1960s, but it was the series Hanski (1967–1973) that made him a household name. He also directed and wrote the scripts with his wife and co-star Liisa Nevalainen (1916–1987). Häyrinen served as the host of the popular radio comedy program Kankkulan kaivolla 1958–1970 and also appeared in a pre-Christmas program Aatonaaton joululahjavalvojaiset with Antero Alpola several times until the year 1990.

== Filmography ==
- Syyllisiäkö? (1938)
- Hätävara (1939)
- Helmikuun manifesti (1939)
- Aktivistit (1939)
- Avoveteen (1939)
- Rikas tyttö (1939)
- Punahousut (1939)
- Kyökin puolella (1940)
- Runon kuningas ja muuttolintu (1940)
- Anu ja Mikko (1940)
- Poikani pääkonsuli (1940)
- Viimeinen vieras (1941)
- Poretta eli Keisarin uudet pisteet (1941)
- Ryhmy ja Romppainen (1941)
- Oi, aika vanha, kultainen...! (1942)
- August järjestää kaiken (1942)
- Nuoria ihmisiä (1943)
- Hevoshuijari (1943)
- Synnitön lankeemus (1943)
- Suurin voitto (1944)
- Naimisiin päiväksi (1946)
- Nuoruus sumussa (1946)
- Sisulla ja sydämellä (1947)
- Kultamitalivaimo (1947)
- Tuhottu nuoruus (1947)
- Aaltoska orkaniseeraa (1949)
- Kanavan laidalla (1949)
- Kaunis Veera eli ballaadi Saimaalta (1950)
- Radio tekee murron (1951)
- Radio tulee hulluksi (1952)
- Oi, muistatkos... (1954)
- Kihlaus (1955)
- Muuan sulhasmies (1956)
- Syntipukki (1957)
- Vieras mies (1957)
- Kulkurin masurkka (1958)
- Asessorin naishuolet (1958)
- Paksunahka (1958)
- Sotapojan heilat (1958)
- Kovaa peliä Pohjolassa (1959)
- Yks' tavallinen Virtanen (1959)
- Patarouva (1959)
- Iskelmäketju (1959)
- Isaskar Keturin ihmeelliset seikkailut (1960)
- Justus järjestää kaiken (1960)
- Kankkulan kaivolla (1960)
- Opettajatar seikkailee (1960)
- Tähtisumua (1961)
- Minkkiturkki (1961)
- Olin nahjuksen vaimo (1961)
- Tyttö ja hattu (1961)
- Oksat pois... (1961)
- Pikku Pietarin piha (1961)
- Millipilleri (1966)
