= Oroligt blod =

1946 film

- Directed by: Teuvo Tulio
- Written by: Nisse Hirn
- Produced by: Teuvo Tulio
- Starring: Regina Linnanheimo; Harriett Philipson; Hans Strååt
- Cinematography: Pentti Lintonen
- Music by: Tauno Marttinen
- Production company: Regentfilm
- Release date: 1946
- Running time: 91 minutes
- Country: Finland
- Language: Swedish

Oroligt blod ("Restless Blood" ) is a 1946 Swedish-language Finnish drama film directed by Teuvo Tulio and starring Regina Linnanheimo, Harriett Philipson and Hans Strååt. The film was shot in parallel with the Finnish-language version Levoton veri.

== Cast ==
- Regina Linnanheimo as Karin Linde
- Hans Strååt as Valter Linde
- Harriett Philipson as Gunilla Dahl
- Lilan Wasström as Elsa, Karin's and Gunilla's aunt
- Matti Nylund as Matte
- Ingrid Östergren as Lisa, the maid
- Nora Mäkinen as the street girl
