= Katariina ja Munkkiniemen kreivi =

1943 Finnish film

- Directed by: Ossi Elstelä
- Written by: Nisse Hirn
- Based on: Katariina ja Munkkiniemen kreivi by Kaarina Viitainoja
- Produced by: Toivo Särkkä
- Starring: Regina Linnanheimo, Leif Wager, Elsa Rantalainen, Ester Toivonen, Eino Kaipainen
- Cinematography: Vittorio Mantovani
- Edited by: Armas Vallasvuo
- Music by: Nils-Eric Fougstedt
- Release date: 31 January 1943
- Running time: 110 minutes
- Country: Finland
- Language: Finnish
- Budget: 1,195,473 mk

Katariina ja Munkkiniemen kreivi (Katariina and the Count of Munkkiniemi) is a 1943 Finnish film directed by Ossi Elstelä. It is based on the novel Katariina ja Munkkiniemen kreivi by Kaarina Viitainoja. The film stars Regina Linnanheimo, Leif Wager, Elsa Rantalainen, Ester Toivonen and Eino Kaipainen. This film was Wager's first major feature film, and as a result he became one of the most popular Finnish male actors of the 1940s.

The film is set in Helsinki in 1860. The plot is about the love between Katariina, a farmhand's daughter, and Count Mauritz Armborg of Munkkiniemi. The film's most famous scene features the "Romance", which Count Mauritz sings in a park by the pond to Katariina, with music by Nils-Eric Fougstedt and lyrics by Reino Hirviseppä.

The film was first aired on Finnish television on 1 October 1965, attracting approximately half a million viewers. A screening in July of the following year drew about 1.36 million viewers. The film has been released on both VHS and DVD.

== Cast ==
- Regina Linnanheimo – Katariina, a farmhand's daughter
- Leif Wager – Count Mauritz Armborg
- Elsa Rantalainen – Countess Yvonne Armborg
- Ester Toivonen – Countess Margareta Armborg
- Sirkka Sipilä – Ingeborg Liliecrona
- Eino Kaipainen – Elias Jahnukainen, a fisherman
- Sasu Haapanen – Hans, a driver
- Irja Kuusla – Eriikka, a maid
- Aku Käyhkö – Count Liliecrona
- Kaisu Leppänen – Elisabeth Gerhard, wife of the governor
- Hilly Lindqvist – Mrs. Jahnukaisen
- Liisa Nevalainen – Arviida, the Gerhard's handmaiden
- Verna Piponius – Countess Ebba Liliecrona
- Jalmari Rinne – Count Fredrik Armborg
- Yrjö Tuominen – Gerhard, the governor
- Orvokki Lahtinen – Margareta's daughter
- Veikko Linna – chef
- Vilho Jägermalm – lackey
- Jarl Malmstén – lackey
- Bertil Holmström – lackey
- Edvin Kajanne – lackey
- Regina Heinonen – housemaid
- Eva Hemming – guest at the dance
- Laila Jokimo – guest at the dance
- Onni Korhonen – guest at the dance
- Aino Angerkoski – guest at the dance
- Uuno Montonen – innkeeper
- Vilho Kekkonen – handyman at the inn
- Kaija Suonio – mistress of the inn
- Eino Salmi – ships mate
- Matti Lehtelä – ship's captain
- Olavi Suominen – seaman
- Eeva Savonen – nurse in Copenhagen
- Jukka Feodorow – street singer
- Varma Lahtinen – assistant's wife
- Marjo Kuusla – young Mauritz
- Aino Mattila – Ms Jansson

== Plot ==
The story begins in the year 1860. The young Count of Munkkiniemi, Mauritz Armborg, and Katariina, the daughter of a farmhand on the estate of the Count's family, are attracted to each other. However, the count's grandmother, Yvonne Armborg, objects to the romance and tries to obstruct it. Elias Jahnukainen, a fisherman, is himself in love with Katariina and wants to marry her, but she has rejected his marriage proposals to date. Count Mauritz dreams of making a career as a violinist and wants to study music abroad. To try to divert Katariina away from her grandson, Countess Yvonne offers to finance Katariina's dowry if she is willing to marry Elias. In addition, Countess Yvonne introduces the young count to Ingeborg Liliecrona. However, Mauritz is not attracted to Ingeborg.

Mauritz and Katariina plan to elope, and make their way to Copenhagen and Rome. The lovers meet at an inn, and spend the evening together. At dawn, Mauritz leaves Katariina an old family heirloom, a necklace. However, a servant to Yvonne informs her of the lovers' plans. The lovers are intercepted before they can travel together to Copenhagen. Katariina is escorted back, apart from Mauritz.

Unhappy at being separated from Mauritz, she tries to commit suicide by jumping off a cliff, but Elias saves her. She then accedes to a marriage with Elias. Separately, Mauritz has continued his journey to Copenhagen, where he is confined for several weeks because of a severe illness. Ingeborg travels to Copenhagen, meets Mauritz, and falsely tells him that Katariina will arrive in Rome in the company of Countess Yvonne. However, upon their arrival in Rome, Mauritz meets Countess Yvonne, who has traveled alone. She tells him that Katariina has married Elias, which leaves Mauritz distraught.

Katariina and Elias have moved into the lower-income Katajanokan district. She has given birth to a son, whom she names Mauritz. Even though the Count is the biological father, Elias promises to treat the son as his own.

Seven years pass. Mauritz and Ingeborg have married, but Mauritz is unhappy because he is still in love with Katariina. At the end of the 1860s, Finland is enduring famine, and plague. Katariina writes a letter of intent to gain admission for her son into a good school, but her application fails, because Elias is of too low a social station.

One day, young Mauritz disappears. Katariina finds him at the house of the governor's wife, Elisabeth Gerhard, whose own son has died. Elisabeth offers to take care of young Mauritz. Katariina objects, but changes her mind after the death of her husband Elias from the plague. Katariina leaves young Mauritz in the care of Elisabeth, and also leaves the necklace with him. Elisabeth and young Mauritz travel to Rome, where young Mauritz meets Count Mauritz. He sees the necklace with young Mauritz, and realises that he is Katariina's son, and thus his own son.

The marriage between Count Mauritz and Ingeborg finally collapses, as the Count has requested permission to travel to Finland with young Mauritz. Ingeborg agrees to a divorce. Count Mauritz and young Mauritz return to Munkkiniemi to a solemn welcome. Count Mauritz plans to apologise to Countess Yvonne, who in her turn has since repented of her scheme to keep Count Mauritz and Katariina apart. When Countess Yvonne meets young Mauritz, she immediately feels great affection for him. Upon seeing the necklace in his possession, she realises that the child is her kin. In the meantime, Katariina has also learned of her son's return to Finland.

One day, Count Mauritz is walking in a park where he and Katariina spent past days of their time together. He begins to sing the "Romance", a song that they both loved. Unbeknownst to him, Katariina is in the same park, and hears the song. The couple finally reunite, as Count Mauritz asks Katariina to come home with him, to "our home".
