= Song of Warsaw =

1953 film by Matti Kassila

- Original Finnish film poster
- Directed by: Matti Kassila
- Written by: Walentin Chorell; Matti Kassila; Juha Nevalainen
- Produced by: T.J. Särkkä
- Starring: Matti Oravisto; Åke Lindman; Christina Paischeff
- Cinematography: Kalle Peronkoski
- Edited by: Armas Vallasvuo
- Music by: Harry Bergström
- Production company: Suomen Filmiteollisuus
- Distributed by: Suomen Filmiteollisuus
- Release date: 13 March 1953
- Country: Finland
- Language: Finnish

Song of Warsaw (Finnish: Varsovan laulu) is a 1953 Finnish crime film directed by Matti Kassila and starring Matti Oravisto, Åke Lindman and Christina Paischeff. The film is based around a smuggling plot, and was filmed in Helsinki and Hamburg.

== Cast ==
- Matti Oravisto as First Officer
- Åke Lindman as Captain
- Christina Paischeff as Ilse
- Leo Riuttu as Inspector Ahmavirta
- Hannes Veivo as Voitto Jalmari Bister
- Kauko Laurikainen as Lauri Elias Koskinen
- Kullervo Kalske as Detective Komppa
- Matti Aulos as Detective Kymäläinen
- Aarne Laine as Owner of Pasilan romu
- Pentti Viljanen as Cook
- Eino Kaipainen as Captain Lieutenant Koivusalo
- Uljas Kandolin as Sea Guard Lahtinen
- Pentti Siimes as Sea Guard
- Tommi Rinne as Sea Guard
- Heimo Lepistö as Worker
- Pentti Irjala as Pentti
- Keijo Komppa as Guard
- Armas Jokio as Man in Hamburg

== Bibliography ==
- Qvist, Per Olov & von Bagh, Peter. Guide to the Cinema of Sweden and Finland. Greenwood Publishing Group, 2000.
