= Halttunen =

Halttunen is a Finnish surname. Notable people with this surname include:

- Jonne Halttunen (born 1985), Finnish rally co-driver
- Kaarlo Halttunen (1909–1986), Finnish actor
- Kasper Halttunen (born 2005), Finnish ice hockey player
- Mika Halttunen, the chairman of the Finnish football team FC Lahti
