= The Song of the Scarlet Flower (1938 film) =

1938 film directed by Teuvo Tulio

- Original Finnish film poster.
- Directed by: Teuvo Tulio
- Written by: Yrjö Kivimies; Regina Linnanheimo; Teuvo Tulio
- Based on: The Song of the Blood-Red Flower by Johannes Linnankoski
- Produced by: Teuvo Tulio
- Starring: Kaarlo Oksanen; Rakel Linnanheimo; Mirjami Kuosmanen; Nora Mäkinen; Birgit Nuotio; Maire Ranius
- Cinematography: Fred Runeberg
- Edited by: Teuvo Tulio
- Music by: Toivo Lampén
- Distributed by: Suomi-Filmi
- Release date: 4 December 1938
- Running time: 110 minutes
- Country: Finland
- Language: Finnish

The Song of the Scarlet Flower (Finnish: Laulu tulipunaisesta kukasta, Swedish: Sången om den eldröda blomman) is a 1938 Finnish romance and drama film. It is based on the novel The Song of the Blood-Red Flower by Johannes Linnankoski, telling the story of a glib log driver Olavi Koskela, who spends his free time flirting with young maids. Film is directed by Teuvo Tulio and it stars Kaarlo Oksanen, Rakel Linnanheimo (sister of Regina Linnanheimo), Mirjami Kuosmanen, Nora Mäkinen, Birgit Nuotio and Maire Ranius. The film was the first Finnish adaptation of the book, with the two previous adaptations being Swedish.

Tulio said he was interested mainly in the book's intense and sensuals love scenes but also in the rafting sessions, which he then used in three later films as well. The film's rafting scenes were shot at the Mankalankoski rapids in Iitti.

The film was premiered in Finland on December 4, 1938. Tulio got his work distributed in Sweden, where the first performance was on October 16, 1939 in Stockholm. In Finland, the audience success of the film was the best of the domestic premieres of 1938, although the film received a rather mixed reception from critics. By the time the 1980s came, the tone of the film's reviews had turned more positive.

== Plot ==
Olavi Koskela, a young and handsome man, wanders as a lumberjack in the countryside, as women and landscapes change frequently. However, Kyllikki, the daughter of the rich Moisio house, does not easily fall for Olavi's charms. Bold Olavi has to descend a life-threatening rapid to win Kyllikki's favor. As if by a miracle, the young man completes the log rafting, and Kyllikki's reluctance begins to melt. Love goes up in flames when Olavi and Kyllikki have to swim across the stream, but the Moisio's host and Kyllikki's father, gets furious when he hears about the young couple's intentions to get married. However, Olavi is not quite an ordinary log man: he is the son from the mighty Koskela house, who has left home after arguing with his parents; Olavi angered them by intending to marry the maid Annikki.

Olavi doesn't try to persuade Moisio's master to be kinder by revealing his true, "fine" parentage, but goes on to continue his journey. Along the way, he meets women he has slept with before. In the end, a man with a lot of experience returns to the homestead, where the mother is lying on her deathbed and forgives her son for the past quarrels. Olavi's father had died before the reconciliation. Olavi returns to Moisio's house and takes Kyllikki as his wife, ignoring the host's objections. By the time of the wedding, Olavi's true identity as the heir to the rich Koskela house has been revealed, and Moisio's host is also very pleased with his daughter's marriage.

However, Olavi and Kyllikki's marriage runs into a crisis already on the wedding day. Olavi wants Kyllikki as a virgin and gets angry when it is revealed by Toivo that Kyllikki once had a boyfriend before Olavi. Kyllikki, on the other hand, reminds Olavi of his adventures with women. The union, which started with a wild frenzy, gradually calms down after the birth of the couple's first child. Finally, sins have received their atonement.

== Cast ==
- Kaarlo Oksanen as Olavi Koskela
- Rakel Linnanheimo as Kyllikki Moisio
- Mirjami Kuosmanen as Annikki
- Nora Mäkinen as Elli/"Gaselli"
- Birgit Nuotio as dark girl
- Maire Ranius as "Pihlajanterttu"
- Sylvi Palo as prostitute
- Aku Peltonen as logging chief
- Veikko Linna as Kyllikki's father
- Lauri Korpela as Olavi's father
- Ida Kallio as Olavi's mother
- Onni Veijonen as Toivo
- Elli Ylimaa as midwife
