= Hurmerinta =

Hurmerinta is a surname. Notable people with the surname include:

- Janna Hurmerinta (born 1981), Finnish singer, daughter of Maarit Hurmerinta, known by the mononym Janna
- Maarit Hurmerinta (born 1953), Finnish singer, known by the mononym Maarit
- Usko Kemppi (1907–1994), Finnish composer, lyricist, author and screenwriter. Called Hurmerinta until 1943
