= Paavo Jännes =

Finnish actor (1892–1970)

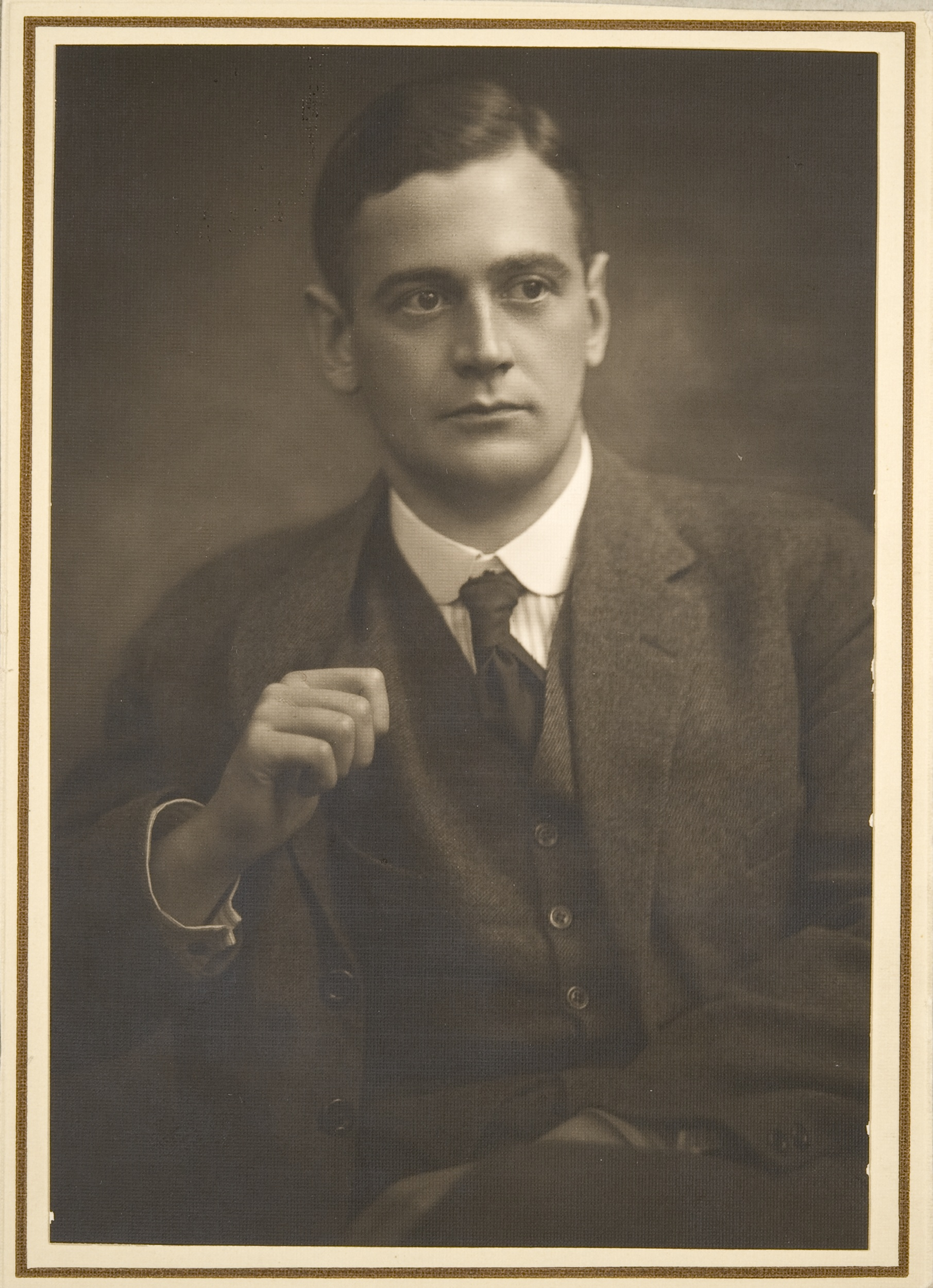
Paavo Jännes in the 1920s

Paavo Klaus Emil Jännes (formerly Genetz, 20 March 1892 − 19 December 1970) was a Finnish theatre and film actor. He appeared in over 70 films between 1913−1969.

== Selected filmography ==
- Sylvi (1913)
- Miehen kylkiluu (1937)
- The Dead Man Falls in Love (1942)
- The Dead Man Loses His Temper (1944)
- Dynamiittityttö (1944)
- Kolmastoista koputus (1945)
- Linnaisten vihreä kamari (1945)
- "Minä elän" (1946)
- Golden Light (1946)
- Radio tekee murron (1951)
- Jealousy (1953)
- Ryysyrannan Jooseppi (1955)
- Risti ja liekki (1957)
- Pikku Pietarin piha (1961)
- Ruusujen aika (1969)
