= The Face in the Mirror (film) =

1953 film by Ralf Rubin

- Directed by: Ralf Rubin
- Written by: Ossi Skurnik; Ralf Rubin
- Produced by: Ralf Rubin
- Cinematography: Ossi Skurnik
- Edited by: Ossi Skurnik
- Music by: Kalevi Hartti
- Release date: 11 September 1953
- Running time: 73 minutes
- Country: Finland
- Language: Finnish

The Face in the Mirror (Finnish: Kasvot kuvastimessa) is a 1953 Finnish drama film directed by Ralf Rubin and starring Airi Honkaniemi, Tauno Majuri and Ritva Karisto. The film's style has some similarities to Italian neorealism.

== Cast ==
- Airi Honkaniemi as Inkeri Harju
- Tauno Majuri as The Doctor
- Ritva Karisto as Tyttö tyttökodissa
- Kalevi Hartti as Veikko Syvärinen
- Jalmari Parikka as Romukauppias
- Aili Valli as Neiti Kaarela
- Erkki Holm
- Uolevi Lönnberg as Kaarlo Virtanen
- Ilmari Louko
- Maria Braithwaite as Inkerin äiti
- Erkki Ertama as Vittorio
- Hellevi Selvilä as Maria Laine
- Valentina Hietala as Opettaja
- Sirkka Breider as Koulun opettaja
- Aje Klinthe as Tyttökodin johtaja
- Veikko Laihanen as Kuppilan pitäjä
- Mirja Karisto as Ulla Rainto
- Leila Lehtonen as Tyttö tyttökodissa
- Ossi Skurnik as Mies ravintolassa

== Bibliography ==
- Alfred Krautz. International directory of cinematographers set- and costume designers in film. Volume V. Saur, 1986.
