= Adventure in Morocco =

1953 film by Eddie Stenberg

- Directed by: Eddie Stenberg
- Written by: Aarne Haapakoski; Olavi Karu
- Produced by: T.J. Särkkä
- Starring: Assi Nortia; Esa Pakarinen; Oke Tuuri
- Cinematography: Marius Raichi
- Edited by: Elmer Lahti
- Music by: Toivo Kärki
- Production company: Suomen Filmiteollisuus
- Distributed by: Suomen Filmiteollisuus
- Release date: 1 January 1953
- Running time: 72 minutes
- Country: Finland
- Language: Finnish

Adventure in Morocco (Finnish: Rantasalmen sulttaani) is a 1953 Finnish comedy film directed by Eddie Stenberg and starring Assi Nortia, Esa Pakarinen and Oke Tuuri.

== Cast ==
- Assi Nortia as Senora Carmen Manzano
- Esa Pakarinen as Esa Pakarinen
- Oke Tuuri as Ville Lipponen
- Kauko Käyhkö as Senor Juan Manzano
- Heimo Lepistö as Paperboy
- Veikko Sorsakivi as Outsider at the insets
- Ossi Skurnik as Receptionist
- Siiri Angerkoski as Jumbu
- Börje Lampenius as Senor singing the serenade
- Rita Elmgren as The Singing Senorita
- Jalmari Parikka as Ticket vendor
- Kalle Peronkoski as Bartender
- Nestori Lampi as Man taking a siesta
- Anton Soini as Accordion player
- Ahmed Riza as Portieer of the Maroccon hotel
- Marita Nordberg as Harem Girl
- Eva Gyldén as Harem Girl
- Maija Routavuo as Harem Girl
- Ulla Sandqvist as Harem girl
- Uuno Montonen as Eunuch
- Matti Aulos as Pasha Ahmed-Lipp-Alih
- Joel Asikainen as Black Servant
- Mej-Ling Axberg as Dancer

== Bibliography ==
- Qvist, Per Olov & von Bagh, Peter. Guide to the Cinema of Sweden and Finland. Greenwood Publishing Group, 2000.
