= Ryhmy ja Romppainen =

Ryhmy ja Romppainen was a Finnish series of adventure stories published as 14 separate volumes during 1940 - 1967, and later ten first books in one volume. The author was Armas Josef Pulla, who has also written many other books. The books were highly popular during the war in winter 1940.

The protagonists, Kalle Ryhmy and Second Lieutenant Ville Romppainen were no action heroes, but down-to-earth rogue forest warriors, who would fight principally with cunning, and disliked the pompous brass and the bureaucracy. For example, a typical trick would be to use machine gun barrage to prevent the crew of a Soviet motor boat to access the deck, and then change the Soviet flag to a pair of dirty underpants.

Always accompanied by Ryhmy's tomcat Mörökölli ("Bogeyman"), their secret weapon was a log of wood, for striking the enemy to knock him out instead of killing. Their archenemy was Commissar Natalia Vengrovska, who would during the series fall in love with Ryhmy and plan to escape to America with him, while Ryhmy was horrified of the thought.

In the book Jees, mullikuhnuri, both protagonists were "knighted" with the Mannerheim Cross. In this exploit, they would find a barge in Lake Ladoga loaded with six brand-new Soviet tanks, and fight a small battle to claim its ownership with a Soviet patrol boat. An embedded reporter accompanying them wrote an article about this, resulting in the Mannerheim crosses being awarded almost instantly.

During the Continuation War, the series was a part of Finnish propaganda. After the war, the British- and Soviet-run Allied Control Commission required the Ryhmy ja Romppainen series removed from public libraries, because in them Soviet soldiers were depicted as lazy, dirty, involuntary and stupid. On the other hand, Pulla does not treat the Finnish higher command with silk gloves: they are represented as bureaucratic, slow-witted and officious. The Nicaraguans are represented as a pompous military dictatorship, which make a civil war on whether the national radio should play classical music (Sinfonistas) or popular music (Cancionistas).

One of the most famous propaganda claims in the book series was that according to Soviet doctrine, skis are suitable only for highway traffic. This was a reference to the initially poor (consider Battle of Raatteentie) ski warfare skills of the Soviet soldiers. Although this did improve, the writer would ignore this.

Three movies were made on the basis of the books. The General Headquarters of the Finnish Defence Forces considered the movie Jees ja just as derogatory to the Finnish soldier. In fall 1944, Finnish censorship (pressed by the Soviet Union) forbade the distribution of Jees ja just as derogatory of the Soviet Union. Distribution of the movie was allowed again only in 1988, during perestroika. In this movie, the protagonists were played by Oiva Luhtala (Ryhmy) and Reino Valkama (Romppainen).
