= Elli Ylimaa =

Finnish actress (1900–1982)

- Born: 11 June 1900; Turku, Grand Duchy of Finland
- Died: 11 May 1982 (aged 81); Helsinki, Finland
- Occupation: Actress
- Years active: 1936-1962 (film)

Ellen "Elli" Johanna Ylimaa, née Linnanheimo, until 1924 Leino (11 June 1900 – 11 May 1982) was a Finnish stage and film actress. She ended up playing supporting roles in dozens of Finnish films from the mid 1930s to the early 1960s.

== Early life ==
Elli Leino was the second of seven children born to real estate agent and businessman Johan Gustaf Leino (née Grönroos) and Aksa Johanna Grönlund, who met each other in Turku. In the beginning of June 1899, their banns were read and they married on Midsummer Day the same year. Elli had four sisters: Ragnhild, Ester, Rakel, and Regina as well as two brothers, Eino and Reino, the first of which was named after Eino Leino. Three of Elli's sisters – Ragnhild, Rakel, and Regina were also actresses. Eino attended the Finnish Academy of Dramatic Arts, but did not devote himself to acting in the end. Their father vehemently opposed his children's theatrical dreams, but inspired by her sister Ragnhild, Elli also began performing on amateur stages in the 1920s and gained fame, especially in comedic roles.

The Leino family moved from Turku to Helsinki in 1911. They were joined by Aksa Grönlund's unmarried sister Aina, who became like a second mother to the children. The family lived in downtown Helsinki.

Elli and her siblings spent their summers in the countryside of Uusimaa. In 1918, during the Finnish Civil War, Johan Leino bought a summer residence for his family in Laukkoski, Pornainen. He found the place while escaping from pursuers by sledge across Lake Kotojärvi. Once renovated, the Rönnvik Villa had 24 rooms. In 1921, this turned into a pension. Elli served on the board of Pensionaatti Rönnvik Osakeyhtiö — Pensionat Rönnvik Aktiebolag, the limited company set up to run the pension. In addition to their pension in Pornainen, they also ran the Linnanheimo boarding house on Louhikatu in Terijoki, which was a popular holiday destination, especially for actors from Vyborg.

== Career ==
The Finnish film directors Teuvo Tulio and Valentin Vaala were good friends of the Linnanheimo sisters and often included them in their own projects. When Vaala began working as a director for Suomi-Filmi in 1935, Ylimaa became one of his trusted actresses in supporting roles playing maids, upper-class young ladies, and uptight women. Tulio also often used Ylimaa in supporting roles for his own film productions. She was usually seen as a trusted companion and confidant to the main characters played by her sister Regina Linnanheimo.

Ylimaa's most notable interpretations include the role of Manta in Tulio's film Taistelu Heikkilän talosta (1936) and the role of the school principal's wife Kristiina Iippo in Vaala's film Varaventtiili (1942). She acted in film roles until the beginning of the 1960s.

== Private life ==
Elli married office clerk Toivo Oskar Ylimaa (prev. Ylander) in 1926. Their son Veikko, or "Ekku", appeared in a small role in the film Taistelu Heikkilä talosta alongside his mother and his aunt Regina. Ylimaa died at the age of 81 in 1982.

== Selected filmography ==
- Substitute Wife (1936)
- The Song of the Scarlet Flower (1938)
- Cross of Love (1946)
- Restless Blood (1946)
- Tree Without Fruit (1947)
- Gabriel, Come Back (1951)
- Two Funny Guys (1953)
- Shamrock (1953)
