= Eija Inkeri =

Finnish actress

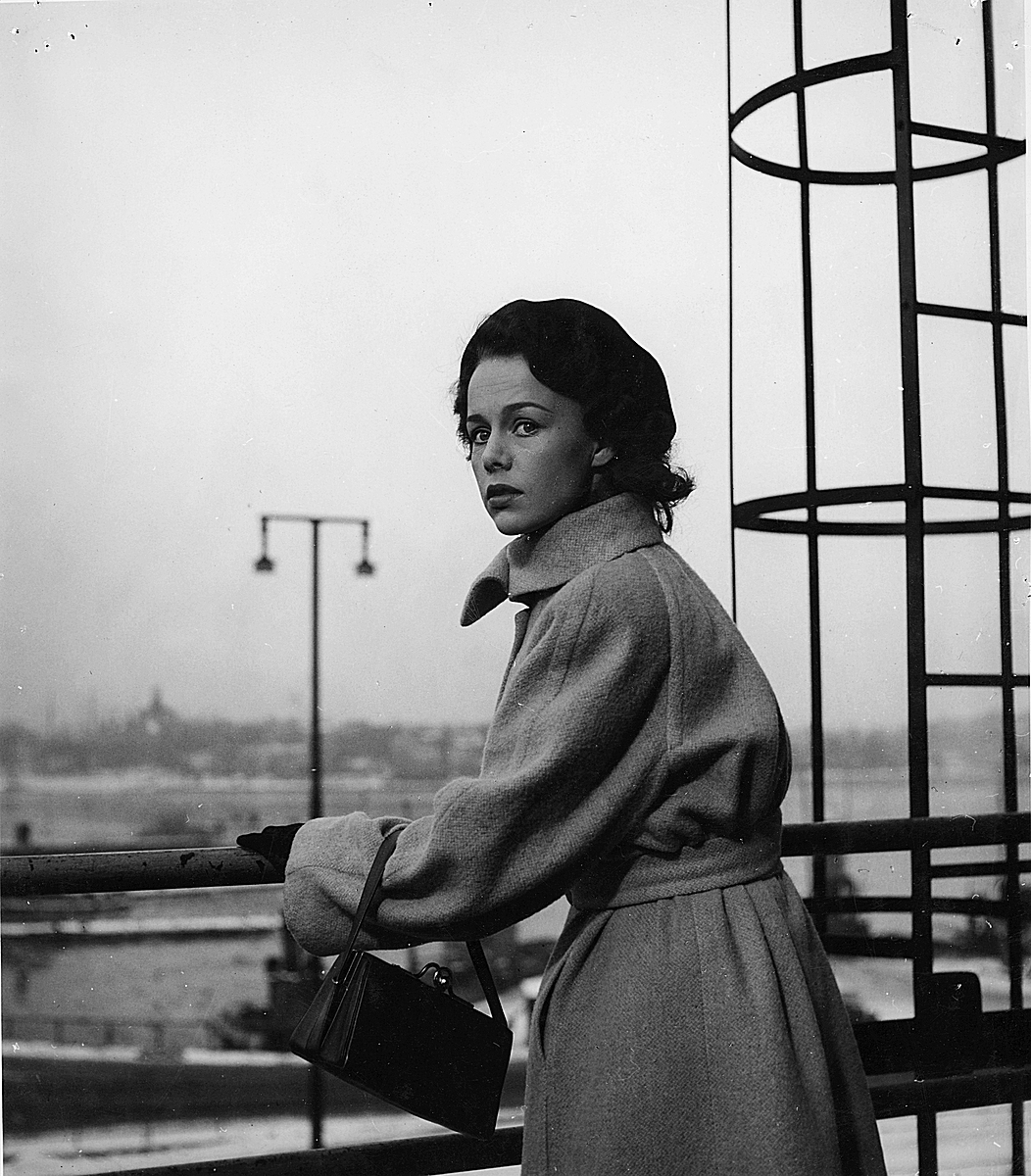
- Born: 27 May 1926; Kuopio, Finland
- Died: 27 September 2012 (aged 86); Lahti, Finland
- Occupation: Actress
- Years active: 1949-1959 (film)

Eija Inkeri (1926–2012) was a Finnish stage and film actress. She was a monthly paid contract actress for SF from 1949 to 1951. In addition, she acted from 1944 onwards at, among others, Joensuu City Theatre, Lahti City Theatre and Radio Theatre.

== Selected filmography ==
- Aaltoska orkaniseeraa (1949)
- Kvinnan bakom allt (1951)
- The General's Fiancée (1951)

== Bibliography ==
- Kari Uusitalo. T. J. Särkkä: legenda jo eläesään. WSOY, 1975.
