= Kaarlo Oksanen =

Finnish footballer and film actor

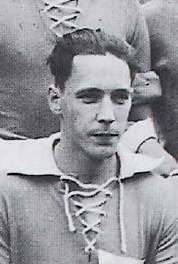
- Kaarlo Oksanen in 1933.

Personal information
- Date of birth: 11 January 1909
- Place of birth: Helsinki, Grand Duchy of Finland
- Date of death: 14 October 1941 (aged 32)
- Place of death: Suna River, East Karelia, Soviet Union
- Position: Defender

Senior career*
Years	Team	Apps	(Gls)
1927–1928	Kullervo Helsinki		
1929–1941	HPS Helsinki	100	(4)

International career
1929–1937	Finland	39	(0)
- * Club domestic league appearances and goals

Kaarlo Vilhelm "Kille" Oksanen, born 11 January 1911 in Helsinki, died 14 October 1941 in East Karelia, Soviet Union, was a Finnish footballer and film actor who was killed in World War II.

== Football career ==
In 1927–1928 Oksanen played for Kullervo Helsinki, which was a member of the left-wing Finnish Workers' Sports Federation (TUL). At the time, Finnish football was split in two, TUL and the Football Association clubs played in their own series and the Finland national team was composed of FA players only. Oksanen won the 1928 TUL Championship with Kullervo and in October he was selected to the Finnish Workers' Sports Federation football team against the Soviet Union in Helsinki.

Before the 1929 season Oksanen defected to the FA member club HPS Helsinki in order to play for the Finland national team. He debuted for Finland in October 1929 against Germany in Hamburg and became a regular member of the national team. Oksanen played 39 out of 43 Finland internationals between 1929 and 1937, but was not selected to the 1936 Berlin Olympics by the manager Ferdinand Fabra.

=== Club honours ===
- TUL Championship: 1928
- Finnish Championship: 1929, 1932, 1934, 1935

== Film career ==
Oksanen started acting in the early 1930s. His first major film role was in the 1937 film Nuorena Nukkunut by Teuvo Tulio, based on a novel by the Nobel Prize winning author F. E. Sillanpää. In 1940 Oksanen got married with the actress Rakel Linnanheimo (1909–2004).

=== Filmography ===
- Nuorena nukkunut (1937)
- The Song of the Scarlet Flower (1938)
- In the Fields of Dreams (1940)
- Antreas ja syntinen Jolanda (1941)

== Death ==
At the World War II Oksanen served as a runner. He was wounded by the Suna River in East Karelia and died at a field hospital in October 1941.
