= Miss Europe 1934 =

International beauty pageant

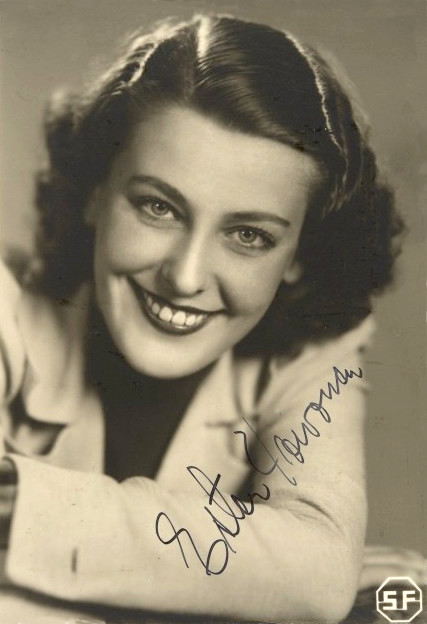
- Ms. Ester Toivonen
- Date: 9 September 1934
- Venue: Hastings, England
- Entrants: 16
- Debuts: Atlantic (America), Finland, Siberia
- Withdrawals: Scotland, Turkey, Yugoslavia
- Returns: Holland, Poland
- Winner: Ester Toivonen; Finland

Miss Europe 1934 was the seventh annual Miss Europe and the sixth edition under French journalist Maurice de Waleffe. New delegates came from the Atlantic, Finland, and Siberia and withdraws from Scotland, Turkey, Yugoslavia.

Before the contest, the representatives from Germany, Russia & Siberia were denounced by the ambassadors of the Soviet Union and the German Reich to the UK as not being true women of those countries.

== Results ==
=== Placements ===
Placement	Contestant
Miss Europe 1934	Finland – Ester Toivonen
1st Runner-Up	England – June Lammas

== Delegates ==
- Atlantic – Louise Lyman
- Belgium – José Mandelaers
- Denmark – Ethel Louis
- England – June Lammas
- Finland – Ester Toivonen
- France – Simone Barillier
- Germany – Maria Magdalena Kant
- Holland – Sonja Coers
- Hungary – Renée Gosztony
- Italy – Tosca Giusti
- Norway – Elsa Lindseth
- Poland – Maria Zabkiewicz
- Romania – Hélène Dona
- Russia (in exile) – Yekaterina Antonova
- Siberia (in exile) – Nadezhda Fomenko
- Spain – María Eugenia Henríquez Girón
