= Kunto Karapää =

Finnish actor

- Born: 8 January 1913; Mäntsälä, Finland
- Died: 1 August 1963 (aged 50); Helsinki, Finland
- Occupation: Actor
- Years active: 1936–1963 (film)

Kunto August Karapää (born Gunnar August Wallin; 1913–1963) was a Finnish stage and film actor. He was married to actress Kirsti Hurme 1944–1950.

== Selected filmography ==
- Substitute Wife (1936)
- Radio tekee murron (1951)

== Bibliography ==
- Pietari Kääpä. Directory of World Cinema: Finland. Intellect Books, 2012.
