= Eila Peitsalo =

Finnish actress

- Born: 17 April 1931; Turku, Finland
- Died: 7 December 1997 (aged 66)
- Occupation: Actress
- Years active: 1948-1988 (film & TV)

Eila Peitsalo (1931–1997) was a Finnish film, television and stage actress.

== Selected filmography ==
- It Began in the Rain (1953)
- After the Fall of Man (1953)
- Poika eli kesäänsä (Young Love) (1955)
- Pekka ja Pätkä puistotäteinä (1955)

== Bibliography ==
- Goble, Alan. The Complete Index to Literary Sources in Film. Walter de Gruyter, 1999.
