= Usko Santavuori =

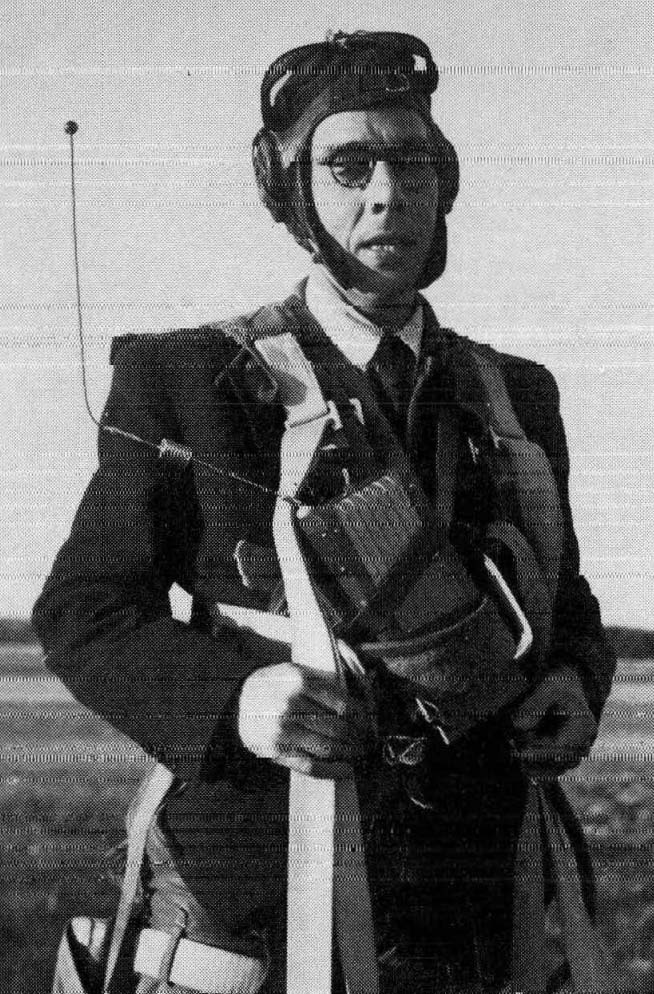
- After a broadcast parachute jump in 1950
- Born: Usko Volmar Abel Santavuori; 16 January 1922; Viipuri, Finland
- Died: 1 June 2003 (aged 81); Espoo, Finland
- Occupation: Radio reporter

Usko Volmar Abel Santavuori (16 January 1922, in Viipuri – 1 June 2003, in Espoo) was a Finnish sensationalist radio reporter. He achieved fame by groundbreaking programs where he took himself and the microphone to participate in various extraordinary events, such as diving and parachuting, instead of remaining a passive observer.

Santavuori's most significant feat was his early reality show in 1950, where he committed a fake burglary, and was arrested by the police, who had no idea of that the criminal they'd come to arrest was a journalist and everything they said was being recorded and later broadcast. The only official who was notified of the event in advance was the chief of police, who had given his blessing. Santavuori's program aroused discussion due to the violence and uncouth language used by the arresting officers. The fake burglary was used as a basis for the 1951 comedy, Radio tekee murron, where the protagonist is a young reporter with a penchant for the kind of novel programs Santavuori himself was famous for.

In his life outside the radio, Santavuori worked as head of public relations for the oil company Esso.
