= Cross of Love =

1946 Finnish film

- Finnish: Rakkauden risti
- Directed by: Teuvo Tulio
- Written by: Nisse Hirn
- Based on: "The Stationmaster" by Alexander Pushkin
- Produced by: Teuvo Tulio
- Starring: Regina Linnanheimo; Oscar Tengström; Ville Salminen
- Cinematography: Uno Pihlström; Pentti Lintonen
- Edited by: Teuvo Tulio
- Music by: Tauno Marttinen
- Production company: Tuxan Film
- Distributed by: Väinän Filmi
- Release date: 8 March 1946
- Running time: 99 minutes
- Country: Finland
- Language: Finnish

Cross of Love (Finnish: Rakkauden risti) is a 1946 Finnish drama film directed by Teuvo Tulio and starring Regina Linnanheimo, Oscar Tengström and Ville Salminen. It is based on the short story "The Stationmaster" by Alexander Pushkin. The film was shot in parallel with the Swedish-language version Kärlekens kors.

== Cast ==
- Regina Linnanheimo as Riitta
- Oscar Tengström as Majakka-Kalle
- Ville Salminen as Mauri Holmberg
- Rauli Tuomi as Henrik Hormi
- Pentti Viljanen as Pekka
- Tuli Arjo as Singer
- Lauri Korpela as Pilot
- Hilly Lindqvist as Saara
- Senja Soitso as Maija
- Elli Ylimaa as Manageress of the dressmaker's shop

== Bibliography ==
- Qvist, Per Olov & von Bagh, Peter. Guide to the Cinema of Sweden and Finland. Greenwood Publishing Group, 2000.
