= A Night in Rio =

1951 film by Ville Salminen

- Directed by: Ville Salminen
- Written by: Toivo Kauppinen; Unto Koskela (poem); Inkeri Marjanen
- Produced by: T.J. Särkkä
- Starring: Assi Nortia; Leif Wager; Tapio Rautavaara
- Cinematography: Kalle Peronkoski
- Edited by: Armas Vallasvuo
- Music by: Harry Bergström
- Production company: Suomen Filmiteollisuus
- Distributed by: Suomen Filmiteollisuus
- Release date: 3 August 1951
- Running time: 72 minutes
- Country: Finland
- Language: Finnish

A Night in Rio (Finnish: Rion yö) is a 1951 Finnish musical comedy film directed by Ville Salminen and starring Assi Nortia, Leif Wager and Tapio Rautavaara. It won an award for the best music (Paras musiikk) in 1951. The plot follows the adventures of three Finns in Rio de Janeiro. It was released on the 3rd of August 1951.

== Cast ==
- Assi Nortia as Carmen Conchita
- Leif Wager as Lefa
- Tapio Rautavaara as Tapsa
- Lasse Pöysti as Lasse
- Ville Salminen as Don Jose
- Rauni Luoma as Donna Lola
- Reino Valkama as Mikko
- Yrjö Ikonen as Miguel
- Birger Kortman
- Rakel Laakso
- Matti Lehtelä
- Veikko Linna as Chef
- Otto Noro
- Heikki Savolainen
- Oke Tuuri as Pedro
- Kauko Vuorensola
- Kaarlo Wilska as Police

== Bibliography ==
- Qvist, Per Olov & von Bagh, Peter. Guide to the Cinema of Sweden and Finland. Greenwood Publishing Group, 2000.
