= Sensuela =

- Directed by: Teuvo Tulio
- Written by: Teuvo Tulio, Yrjö Norta
- Based on: The Stationmaster by Alexander Pushkin
- Produced by: Teuvo Tulio
- Starring: Marianne Mardi; Mauritz Åkerman; Ossi Elstelä; Ismo Saario
- Cinematography: Teuvo Tulio, Yrjö Norta
- Edited by: Yrjö Norta
- Music by: Pyotr Ilyich Tchaikovsky
- Production company: Suomi-Filmi Oy
- Distributed by: Suomi-Filmi Oy
- Release date: 29 May 1973
- Running time: 110 minutes (original version); 105 minutes (cut version)
- Country: Finland
- Languages: English (original); Finnish (re-recorded)

Sensuela is a 1973 Finnish drama film directed and written by Teuvo Tulio. The film is based on Tulio's 1946 film Rakkauden risti which itself was based on The Stationmaster, a short story written by Alexander Pushkin. Sensuela was Tulio's final film, and it was met with harsh criticism. Since its release, it has gained a reputation as a campy cult classic and has been called "the weirdest Finnish film ever made". Although the production was finished in 1972, it was not released until a year later and then opened only in selected theatres.

== Premise ==
Set during the Continuation War (1941–1944) and the Lapland War (1944–1945), Sensuela is the story of Laila, a girl from Lapland, and Hans, a German soldier, who fall in love during the Continuation War.

== Main cast ==
- Marianne Mardi as Laila Walk
- Mauritz Åkerman as Hans Müller
- Ismo Saario as Pekka
- Ossi Elstelä as Laila's father
- Maria Pertamo as Greta Kujala

== Release ==
Sensuela was the first film to be rated 18 by the Finnish Board of Film Classification. After its initial release, Tulio prevented the film's subsequent distribution, and it only became available after his death in 2000.

== See also ==
- The Hair (film)
