= Restless Blood =

1946 film

- Directed by: Teuvo Tulio
- Written by: Nisse Hirn; Regina Linnanheimo; Teuvo Tulio
- Produced by: Teuvo Tulio
- Starring: Regina Linnanheimo; Eino Katajavuori; Toini Vartiainen
- Cinematography: Pentti Lintonen
- Edited by: Teuvo Tulio
- Music by: Tauno Marttinen
- Distributed by: Väinän Filmi
- Release date: 26 April 1946
- Running time: 91 minutes
- Country: Finland
- Language: Finnish

Restless Blood (Finnish: Levoton veri) is a 1946 Finnish drama film directed by Teuvo Tulio and starring Regina Linnanheimo, Eino Katajavuori and Toini Vartiainen. The film tells the story of siblings Sylvi and Outi, who love the same man, Sylvi's husband Valter. The couple's relationship breaks down after the tragic death of their child. After becoming blind, Sylvi suspects Valter is being unfaithful to her. She begins spying on her husband and sister Outi, and gradually her mental health deteriorates with fatal consequences.

The film was shot in parallel with the Swedish-language version Oroligt blod.

Tulio remade the film in 1953 as Jealousy.

== Cast ==
- Regina Linnanheimo as Sylvi
- Eino Katajavuori as Valter Sora
- Toini Vartiainen as Outi Kahra
- H. Stenroos as Liisa
- Lauri Korpela as Brauner
- Laina Laine as Housekeeper
- Nora Mäkinen as Prostitute
- Lida Salin as Bar hostess
- Emma Väänänen as Mother in consulting room
- Elli Ylimaa as Aunt

== Bibliography ==
- Pietari Kääpä. Directory of World Cinema: Finland. Intellect Books, 2012.
