= Harry Bergström =

Finnish musician

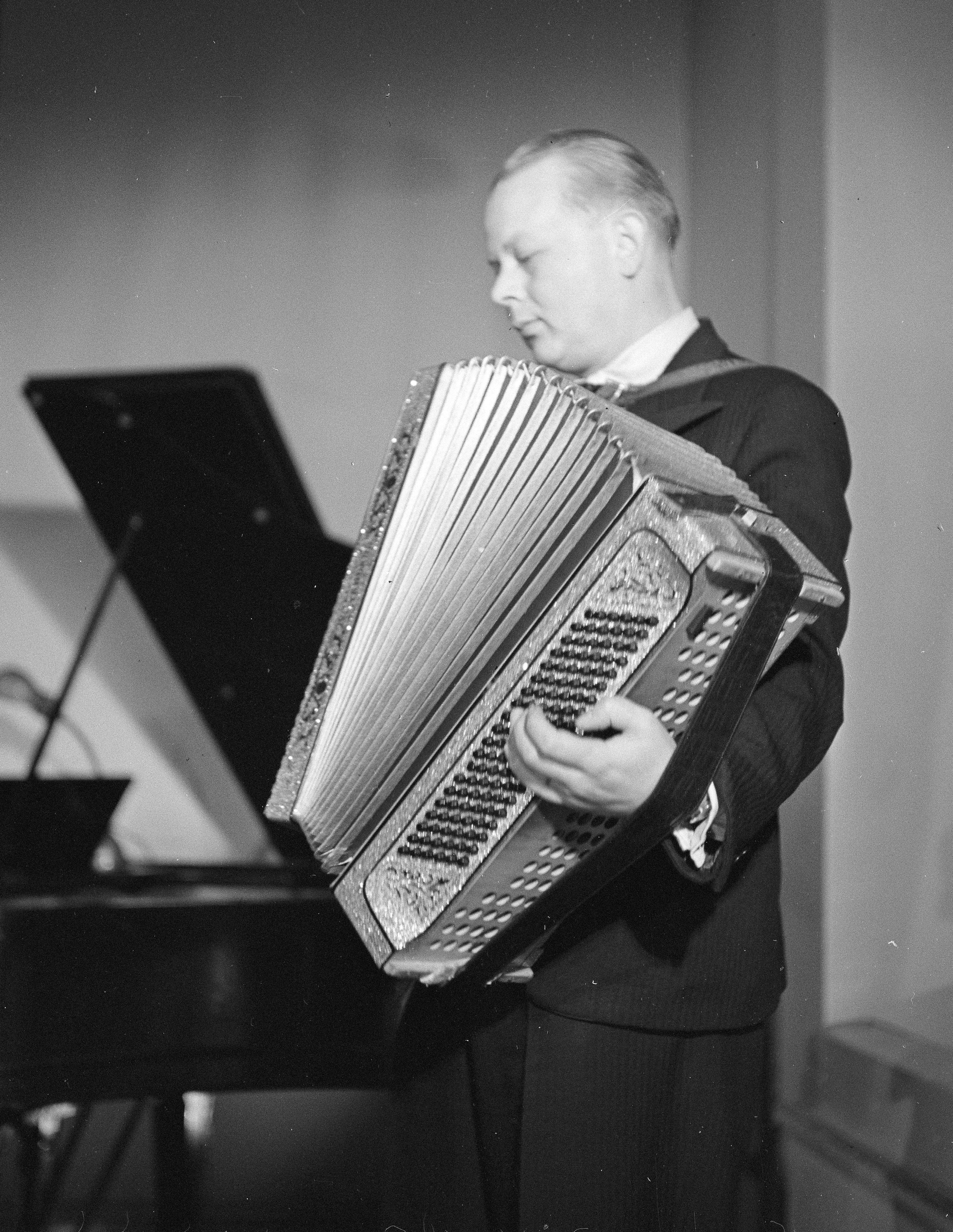
- Born: 4 April 1910; Tampere, Finland
- Died: 11 December 1989 (aged 79); Nurmijärvi, Finland
- Occupation: Composer
- Years active: 1936–1977 (film)

Harry Lennart Yrjö Bergström (1910–1989) was a Finnish pianist, conductor and composer of popular music and film scores.

== Selected filmography ==
- The Rapids-Rider's Brides (1937)
- The General's Fiancée (1951)
- A Night in Rio (1951)
- After the Fall of Man (1953)
- It Began in the Rain (1953)
- Song of Warsaw (1953)
- The Wild North (1955)

== Bibliography ==
- Kääpä, Pietari: Directory of World Cinema: Finland. Intellect Books, 2012.
- Virtamo, Keijo (ed.): Otavan musiikkitieto: A–Ö, pp. 46–47. Helsinki: Otava, 1997. ISBN 951-1-14518-5.
