= Leena Häkinen =

Finnish actress (1928–1990)

- Born: 10 July 1928; Helsinki, Finland
- Died: 19 June 1990 (aged 61); Helsinki, Finland
- Occupation: Actress
- Years active: 1946-1976 (film & TV)

Leena Häkinen (1928–1990) was a Finnish stage, film and television actress.

== Selected filmography ==
- Sleeping Beauty (1949)
- The General's Fiancée (1951)
- Shamrock (1953)
- Tweet, Tweet (1958)

== Bibliography ==
- Ritva Heikkilä. Suomen kansallisteatteri: The Finnish national theatre. W. Söderström, 1972.
