= Börje Lampenius =

Finnish actor, director and singer (1921–2016)

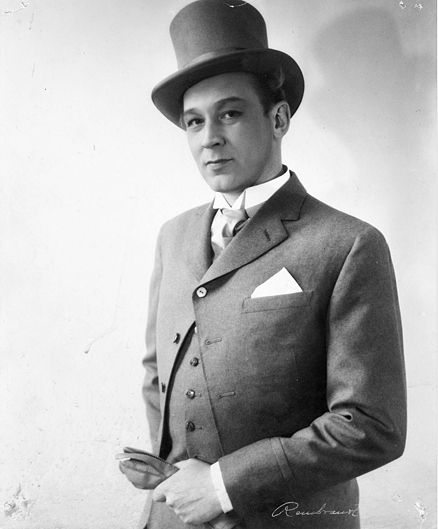
Börje Lampenius in the role of Khlestakov from Nikolai Gogol's The Government Inspector.

Tor Börje Lampenius (18 December 1921 – 3 November 2016) was a Finnish actor, director and singer. He made an extensive career in the Swedish Theatre in Helsinki. His most notable roles included the lead role in Death of a Salesman and the role of Freddy in the Finnish version of the musical My Fair Lady. Lampenius has recorded a number of hits and starred in movies both in Finland and in Sweden. In 2000, Lampenius was granted, by the Organization of Finnish Theatres, the Badge of the Golden Federation.

== Theatre ==
Lampenius developed an interest in the theatre by age six. After his mandatory service in World War II and so on from 1944 to 1946, he was a pupil at the Swedish Theatre. In addition, he studied in vocal studies at Klosters Röstskolassa. He worked at the Swedish Theatre since 1946 as a director and as an actor and also worked as a set designer. Lampenius's most significant roles included the Hertig Adam (Tiggarstudenten), Freddy (My Fair Lady) and Theseus (Hippolytus). Under guidance, he also played in Kort möte, Åtta kvinnor and Swedenhjelms. In addition, he directed children's plays. Lampenius retired in 1987. After that, he starred in, among other things, Robert Alftan's På hemmafrontet intet nytt at the Swedish Theatre.

== Movies and music ==
Lampenius had side parts in many Finnish films of the 1950s, for example, the role Filip von Schantz in the film Mä oksalla ylimmällä in 1954. In 1978, he had a supporting actor in the Swedish film Slumrande toner.

Lampenius recorded in the 1950s more than twenty schlager songs, including "Vanha riimu", "Istanbul", "Nainen – mies" (with Brita Koivusen), and "Erämaajärven mökki". Lampenius, later in life, indulged in, inter alia, painting and playing the piano.

== Personal life ==
Börje Lampenius was born in Helsinki to Karl Wilhelm Lampenius and Berta Maria Sandberg. Between 1951 and 1970, he was married to actress Gunvor Sandkvist, and had two children: Lili Charlotte (born 1955) and Bo Harald (born 1962). The violinist Linda Brava is Börje Lampenius and actress Ulla Eklund's daughter. He died on 3 November 2016 at the age of 94.

== Filmography ==
- Läpi usvan (1948)
- Suomalaistyttöjä Tukholmassa (1952)
- Salakuljettajan laulu (1952)
- Rantasalmen sulttaani (1953)
- Onnelliset (1954)
- Mä oksalla ylimmällä (1954)
- Pieni luutatyttö (1958)
- Män kan inte våldtas (Miestä ei voi raiskata) (1978)
- Harjunpää och kalla döden (Harjunpää ja kylmä kuolema) (1983)

== Sources ==
- Suomen teatterit ja teatterintekijät 1983. ISBN 951-30-5727-5
- Börje Lampenius in Elonet.
- Turun Sanomat.
- Yleisradio.
- Svensk Filmdatabas.
- Pomus.net.
