= After the Fall of Man =

1953 film by Edvin Laine

- Finnish: Jälkeen syntiinlankeemuksen
- Directed by: Edvin Laine
- Screenplay by: Juha Nevalainen
- Based on: Purppuralaahus by Arvi Kivimaa
- Produced by: T.J. Särkkä
- Starring: Martti Katajisto; Eila Peitsalo; Edvin Laine
- Cinematography: Pentti Unho
- Edited by: Elmer Lahti
- Music by: Harry Bergström
- Production company: Suomen Filmiteollisuus
- Distributed by: Suomen Filmiteollisuus
- Release date: 22 May 1953
- Country: Finland
- Language: Finnish

After the Fall of Man (Finnish: Jälkeen syntiinlankeemuksen) is a 1953 Finnish drama film directed by Edvin Laine and starring Martti Katajisto, Eila Peitsalo and Edvin Laine. It is based on the novel Purppuralaahus by Arvi Kivimaa.

== Cast ==
- Martti Katajisto as Klaus Toivola
- Eila Peitsalo as Anja
- Edvin Laine as Maisteri Kahari
- Helena Vinkka as Elsa Tuovi
- Matti Aulos as Ranta - factor
- Kaarlo Halttunen as Harjula
- Alli Häjänen as Anni Järvinen
- Eino Kaipainen as Opettaja
- Marjatta Kallio as Koululainen
- Martta Kinnunen as Siivooja
- Martta Kontula as Opettaja
- Aarne Laine as Rector
- Matti Ranin as Aarne
- Emma Väänänen as Klausin äiti
- Pentti Irjala as Onnenpyörän hoitaja
- Heikki Savolainen as Janitor

== Bibliography ==
- Tad Bentley Hammer. International film prizes: an encyclopedia. Garland, 1991.
