= Eino Kaipainen =

Finnish actor (1899–1995)

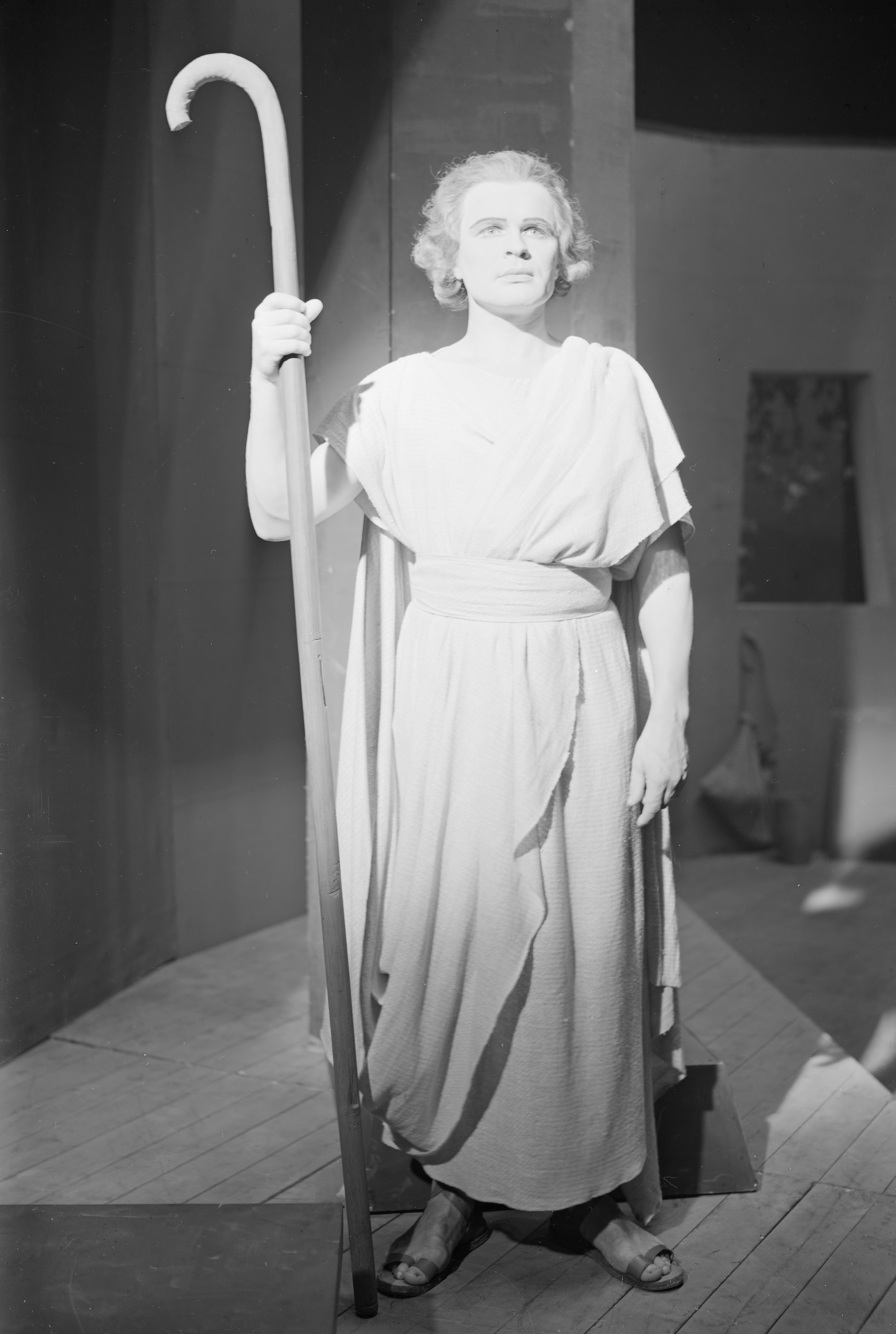
- Eino Kaipainen in the Finnish National Theatre's Bible-themed play-1937
- Born: 2 December 1899; Jäppilä, Grand Duchy of Finland
- Died: 31 January 1995 (aged 95); Helsinki, Finland
- Occupation: Actor
- Years active: 1936-1979 (film)

Eino Kaipainen (1899–1995) was a Finnish actor.

== Selected filmography ==
- Katariina ja Munkkiniemen kreivi (1943)
- North Express (1947)
- The General's Fiancée (1951)
- Song of Warsaw (1953)
- After the Fall of Man (1953)
- Esa Flies to Kuopio (1953)
- It Began in the Rain (1953)
- Juha (1956)

== Bibliography ==
- Goble, Alan. The Complete Index to Literary Sources in Film. Walter de Gruyter, 1999.
