= Rosalia Gurovich =

Finnish barber

Rosalia (Rosa Ruiza Leah) Gurovich, also known as Rosa Mäkinen (born 13 November 1902 in Vyborg, Grand Duchy of Finland - died 3 January 1966 in Kotka, Finland) was a Finnish barber from Kotka, said to have been the inspiration for the song Kotkan ruusu (lit. 'Kotka's rose').

== Life ==
Gurovich was born into a wealthy Jewish family. Her mother was from Turku and her father was a Russian Jew who had come to Finland as a soldier. Rosalia married Lauri Mäkinen, a non-Jewish policeman from Vyborg, which brought shame to her family. When Rosalia, while still underage herself, gave birth to her child Nora (Eleonora, 1920 - 1984), later known as a model and an actress, her mother was said to have committed suicide. The couple later divorced, and Nora was raised by the parents of Gurovich's lover Eero Hirvimaa. At first Gurovich worked as a seamstress, and as she was good at languages, she also taught various languages. She spoke Russian at home, her first language was Swedish and she also spoke German and English. She later founded a barbershop in Kotka in the Tukkukaupantalo building near the harbour. According to her granddaughter she suffered from alcoholism, and there were frequent parties in the back room involving wine and song.

== In culture ==
In September 2021 a play named Kotkan ruusu, based on Rosalia Gurovich's life, premiered at the Kotka City Theatre in Kotka, Finland.
