= Assi Nortia =

Finnish actress (1925–1989)

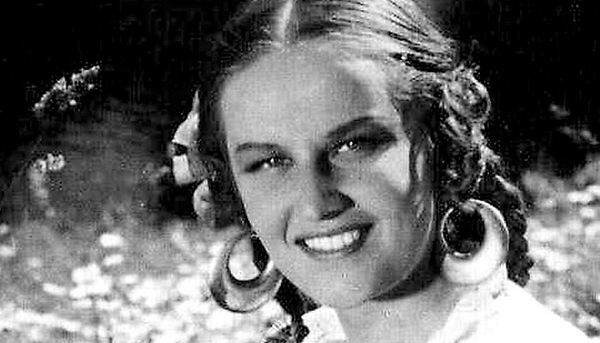
- Born: 2 September 1925; Viipuri, Finland
- Died: 16 January 1989 (aged 63); Tampere, Finland
- Occupation: Actress
- Years active: 1944-1987 (film & TV)

Assi Nortia (2 September 1925 – 16 January 1989) was a Finnish film actress.

== Selected filmography ==
- A Night in Rio (1951)
- Adventure in Morocco (1953)
- Juha (1956)

== Bibliography ==
- Pietari Kääpä. Directory of World Cinema: Finland. Intellect Books, 2012.
