= Nora Mäkinen =

Finnish model and actress

Eleonora "Nora" Mäkinen (also named Gabrielsson and Marttinen; born 11 December 1920 in Vyborg – died 28 February 1984 in Helsinki) was a Finnish model and actor.

Mäkinen was one of the most popular models and mannequins in Finland in the 1930s and 1940s. She started modelling at the age of 15 when she was chosen as Miss Heinola.

Mäkinen's film career started when Toivo Särkkä noticed her at a fair in Helsinki and asked her for a photoshoot. Mäkinen first acted in small roles in Suomen Filmiteollisuus's films. Her most significant role was as Vappu Vuorenkaiku in the film Vihtori ja Klaara (1939). Other notable minor roles were the maid turned prostitute "Gaselli" in the film The Song of the Scarlet Flower and Elina who broke up with her boyfriend in the comedy Hätävara (1939).

Mäkinen was first married to the artist Veikko Marttinen and then to the police commander Erik Gabrielsson. Her mother was Russian-Jewish Rosalia Gurovich, also named Rosa Mäkinen, known as "Kotka's Rose".

== Filmography ==
| Year | Film | Role |
|---|---|---|
| 1937 | Lapatossu | youth in a travelling company |
| 1937 | Kuriton sukupolvi | Löpö |
| 1938 | The Song of the Scarlet Flower | Elli, "Gaselli” |
| 1938 | Markan tähden | woman at a spa beach |
| 1938 | Tulitikkuja lainaamassa | Anna-Kaisa Hyvärinen |
| 1939 | Hätävara | Elina |
| 1939 | Aktivistit | Niskanen's maid |
| 1939 | Vihtori ja Klaara | Vappu Vuorenkaiku |
| 1940 | Poikani pääkonsuli | charity worker |
| 1946 | Restless Blood | prostitute |

== Sources ==
- Rytkönen, Sisko: Nora Mäkinen, Elonet 8 February 2014.
- Helsingin muotisalongit ja salonkimuoti (archived)
