= Ester Toivonen =

Finnish model (1914–1979)

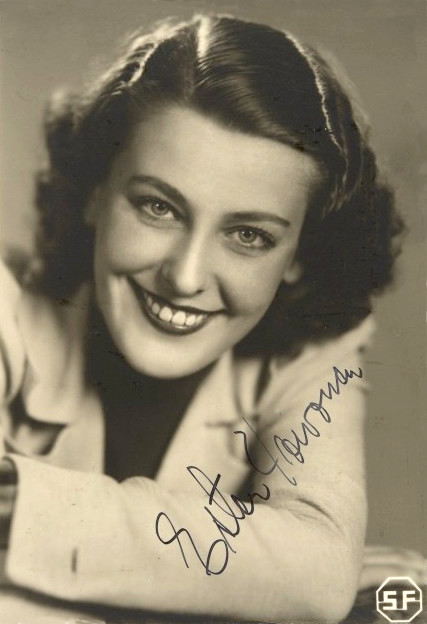
Ester Toivonen in the late 1930s.

Ester Toivonen (August 7, 1914 Hamina — December 29, 1979 Helsinki) was elected Miss Finland in 1933. She was 19 and working in a bread shop in Helsinki when she was discovered by the director of the Helsinki Golf-Casino, where the Finnish pageant was to be held. She also won the Miss Europe Contest in Great Britain 1934. Later she became a film star.

Toivonen met Eero Siirala, a civil servant from Vyborg, even before the Miss Europe competition. They married after ten years of dating in 1943. They moved to the northern part of Kruununhaka, Helsinki, in the autumn of 1944. The family had two children. In 1965, Toivonen published her memoirs, Rikas on elämä ("Life is Rich"). Ester Toivonen died of lung cancer at the age of 65 on December 29, 1979.
