= Elsa Rantalainen =

Finnish actress (1901–1988)

Elsa E. Rantalainen
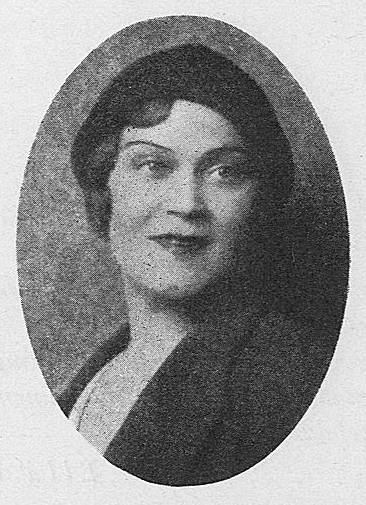
- Born: 30 June 1901; Tampere, Finland
- Died: 6 January 1988 (aged 86); Helsinki, Finland
- Occupation: Actor

Elsa Emilia Rantalainen (1901–1988) was a Finnish actress. She was most active as an actress between 1933 and 1951. From 1931 until 1941 she was married to Wäinö Aaltonen. In 1954, she was awarded the Pro Finlandia award. She was a member of and performer at the Raittiusyhdistys Koitto.

== Works ==
- 1943, Katariina ja Munkkiniemen kreivi
- 1943, Tuomari Martta
