= Aaltoska orkaniseeraa =

- Directed by: Edvin Laine; Matti Kassila
- Written by: Toivo Kauppinen
- Starring: Joel Asikainen; Matti Aulos
- Release date: 15 July 1949
- Country: Finland
- Language: Finnish

Aaltoska orkaniseeraa (lit. 'Mrs. Aaltonen Organises') is a 1949 Finnish comedy film directed by Edvin Laine and Matti Kassila. The film was released on 15 July 1949.

== Cast ==
- Elna Hellman – Mrs. Aaltonen
- Hannes Häyrinen – Lipponen, crime reporter
- Veli-Matti Kaitala – Jukka (as Veli-Matti)
- Eija Inkeri
- Pentti Irjala – Constable (uncredited)
- Mauri Jaakkola
- Sasu Haapanen
- Armas Jokio – Room applicant
- Birger Kortman
- Irja Kuusla

== Critical response ==
Aaltoska orkaniseeraa received generally positive reviews.
