= The Dead Man Loses His Temper =

1944 film

- Directed by: Ilmari Unho
- Written by: Simo Penttilä; Ilmari Unho
- Produced by: Matti Schreck
- Starring: Joel Rinne; Regina Linnanheimo; Kaija Rahola
- Cinematography: Erkki Majava; Kalle Peronkoski
- Edited by: Elle Hongisto
- Music by: George de Godzinsky
- Production company: Suomi-Filmi
- Distributed by: Suomi-Filmi
- Release date: 13 August 1944
- Running time: 95 minutes
- Country: Finland
- Language: Finnish

The Dead Man Loses His Temper (Finnish: Kuollut mies vihastuu) is a 1944 Finnish comedy thriller film directed by Ilmari Unho and starring Joel Rinne, Regina Linnanheimo and Kaija Rahola. The film's sets were designed by the art director Ville Salminen. It is a sequel to the 1942 film The Dead Man Falls in Love and was followed by a third film Kuollut mies kummittelee in 1952.

== Cast ==
- Joel Rinne as Eversti Rainer Sarmo / 'Kuollut mies'
- Regina Linnanheimo as Maria Lichter
- Kaija Rahola as Leila Varta
- Reino Valkama as Mikko Vehmer
- Ville Salminen as Josi Hakim
- Rauli Tuomi as Raimo Varta
- Eine Laine as Lyyli Montola
- Ture Junttu as Riku Aallos
- Vilho Siivola as Pauli Rönn
- Oiva Luhtala as Lukki
- Matti Lehtelä as Vänä
- Arvo Lehesmaa as Zeewick
- Jorma Nortimo as Barrio
- Paavo Jännes as Merkkilä

== Bibliography ==
- Qvist, Per Olov & Von Bagh, Peter. Guide to the Cinema of Sweden and Finland. Greenwood Publishing Group, 2000.
- Von Bagh, Peter. Drifting Shadows: A Guide to the Finnish Cinema. Otava, 2000.
