= Usko Kemppi =

Finnish composer (1907–1994)

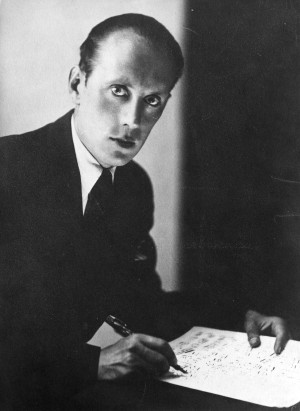
Usko Kemppi

Usko Urho Uljas Kemppi (until 1943 Hurmerinta, 12 February 1907 – 13 May 1994) was a Finnish composer, lyricist, author and screenwriter. His body of work consisted of songs, plays and manuscripts.

== Selected filmography as a screenwriter ==
- Linnaisten vihreä kamari (1945)
- Maaret – tunturien tyttö (1947)
- Sillankorvan emäntä (1953)
- Siltalan pehtoori (1953)
- Nuoruus vauhdissa (1961)
