= Varma Lahtinen =

Finnish actress

Varma Agnes Lahtinen (24 December 1894–1 July 1976) was a Finnish actress. She appeared in about 80 Finnish films between 1937 and 1970. Lahtinen starred in six Pekka Puupää films, among others.

== Selected filmography ==
- In the Fields of Dreams (1940)
