= In the Fields of Dreams =

1940 Finnish film

- Finnish: Unelma karjamajalla
- Directed by: Teuvo Tulio
- Written by: Teuvo Tulio
- Based on: Hälsingar by Henning Ohlson
- Starring: Sirkka Salonen; Olga Tainio; Kaarlo Oksanen
- Cinematography: Felix Forsman; Armas Fredman; Eino Heino
- Edited by: Teuvo Tulio
- Production company: Tarmo-Filmi
- Distributed by: Suomi-Filmi
- Release date: 29 September 1940
- Running time: 108 minutes
- Country: Finland
- Language: Finnish

In the Fields of Dreams (Finnish: Unelma karjamajalla) is a 1940 Finnish drama film directed by Teuvo Tulio and starring Sirkka Salonen, Olga Tainio and Kaarlo Oksanen. It is a remake of the 1933 Swedish film People of Hälsingland, which is based on the play Hälsingar by Henning Ohlson.

== Cast ==
- Sirkka Salonen as Sirkka Valkama
- Olga Tainio as Lady of Ylitalo
- Kaarlo Oksanen as Ylitalon Aarne
- Kyösti Erämaa as Ylitalon Urho
- Kirsti Hurme as Kirsti Turja
- Aku Peltonen as Matti
- Varma Lahtinen as Aino
- Eino Jurkka as Shopkeeper
- Ida Kallio as Kerttu
- Väinö Kangas as Judge
- Evald Terho as Old gypsy
- Taito Mäkelä as Prosecutor
- Timo Jokinen as Sirkka's son
- Lauri Korpela as Antti
- Veikko Laakso as Jailer

== Bibliography ==
- Sundholm, John; Thorsen, Isak; Andersson, Lars Gustaf (20 September 2012). Historical Dictionary of Scandinavian Cinema. Scarecrow Press, Bloomsbury Publishing PLC. ISBN 978-0-8108-5524-3.
