= Uljas Kandolin =

Finnish actor

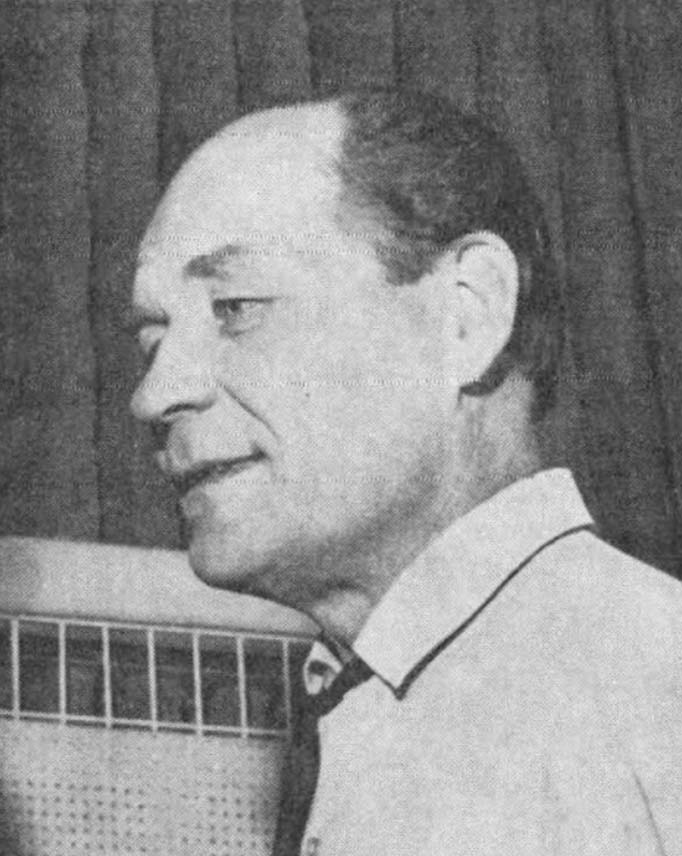
- Kandolin in 1963
- Born: Uljas Salomon Niskanen; May 19, 1915; Helsinki, Grand Duchy of Finland
- Died: December 27, 1980 (aged 65); Helsinki, Finland
- Other name: Uljas Salomon Kandolin
- Occupations: Actor; diver
- Years active: 1946–1979

Uljas Salomon Kandolin (né Niskanen, 19 May 1915 − 27 December 1980) was a Finnish actor. During his career, he appeared in several films, usually playing a thug. He also had a long theatrical career.

== Filmography ==
- "Minä elän" (1946)
- Radio tekee murron (1951)
- Radio tulee hulluksi (1952)
- Pekka Puupää (1953)
- Morsiusseppele (1954)
- Villi Pohjola (1955)
- Ei ruumiita makuuhuoneeseen (1959)
- Oksat pois... (1961)
- Natalia (1979)
