= Reino Valkama =

Reino Adolf Valkama (4 April 1906 – 9 August 1962) was a Finnish actor. He appeared in 75 films during his career while also working for several theatres. In the 1930s, he was the manager of Mikkeli Theatre.

Valkama received the Pro Finlandia award in 1957. Actress Ritva Valkama (born 1932) is his daughter.

== Selected filmography ==
- Rikas tyttö (1939)
- Morsian yllättää (1941)
- The Dead Man Falls in Love (1942)
- The Dead Man Loses His Temper (1944)
- Linnaisten vihreä kamari (1945)
- "Minä elän" (1946)
- Kesäillan valssi (1951)
- A Night in Rio (1951)
- Ryysyrannan Jooseppi (1955)
- Rakas varkaani (1957)
- Nuoruus vauhdissa (1961)
