= Kaija Rahola =

Finnish actress

Kaija Marja Rahola (beginning in 1941 Lampela, 22 March 1920, Tampere − 24 July 1962) was a Finnish actress. She is perhaps best remembered for her role as Ringa Littow in a Valentin Vaala film Linnaisten vihreä kamari (1945).

== Selected filmography ==
- Vihreä kulta (1939)
- Jumalan myrsky (1940)
- Kirkastettu sydän (1943)
- The Dead Man Loses His Temper (1944)
- Linnaisten vihreä kamari (1945)
- Vastaus (1952)
