= The Dead Man Falls in Love =

1942 film

- Directed by: Ilmari Unho
- Written by: Simo Penttilä; Ilmari Unho
- Produced by: Risto Orko
- Starring: Hilkka Helinä; Joel Rinne; Tauno Majuri
- Cinematography: Erkki Majava
- Edited by: Elle Hongisto
- Music by: George de Godzinsky
- Production company: Suomi-Filmi
- Distributed by: Suomi-Filmi
- Release date: 16 August 1942
- Running time: 91 minutes
- Country: Finland
- Language: Finnish

The Dead Man Falls in Love (Finnish: Kuollut mies rakastuu) is a 1942 Finnish comedy thriller film directed by Ilmari Unho and starring Hilkka Helinä, Joel Rinne and Tauno Majuri. The film's sets were designed by the art director Arvo Kotilainen. It was the first of a trilogy followed by The Dead Man Loses His Temper (1944) and Kuollut mies kummittelee (1952).

== Cast ==
- Hilkka Helinä as Berita Eliza Lopez
- Joel Rinne as Eversti Rainer Sarmo / 'Kuollut mies'
- Tauno Majuri as Timo Aarma
- Reino Valkama as Mikko Vehmer
- Paavo Jännes as Fredrik Ahrman
- Santeri Karilo as Thomas Gardener
- Wilho Ilmari as Luigi Lopez
- Pentti Saares as Harri Temmes
- Eine Laine as Emilia
- Rauha Rentola as Leena

== Bibliography ==
- Bacon. Henry. Finnish Cinema: A Transnational Enterprise. Springer, 2016.
- Iverson, Gunnar, Soderbergh Widding, Astrid & Soila, Tytti (ed.) Nordic National Cinemas. Routledge, 2005.
- Qvist, Per Olov & Von Bagh, Peter. Guide to the Cinema of Sweden and Finland. Greenwood Publishing Group, 2000.
- Von Bagh, Peter. Drifting Shadows: A Guide to the Finnish Cinema. Otava, 2000.
