= Kaarlo Halttunen =

Finnish actor

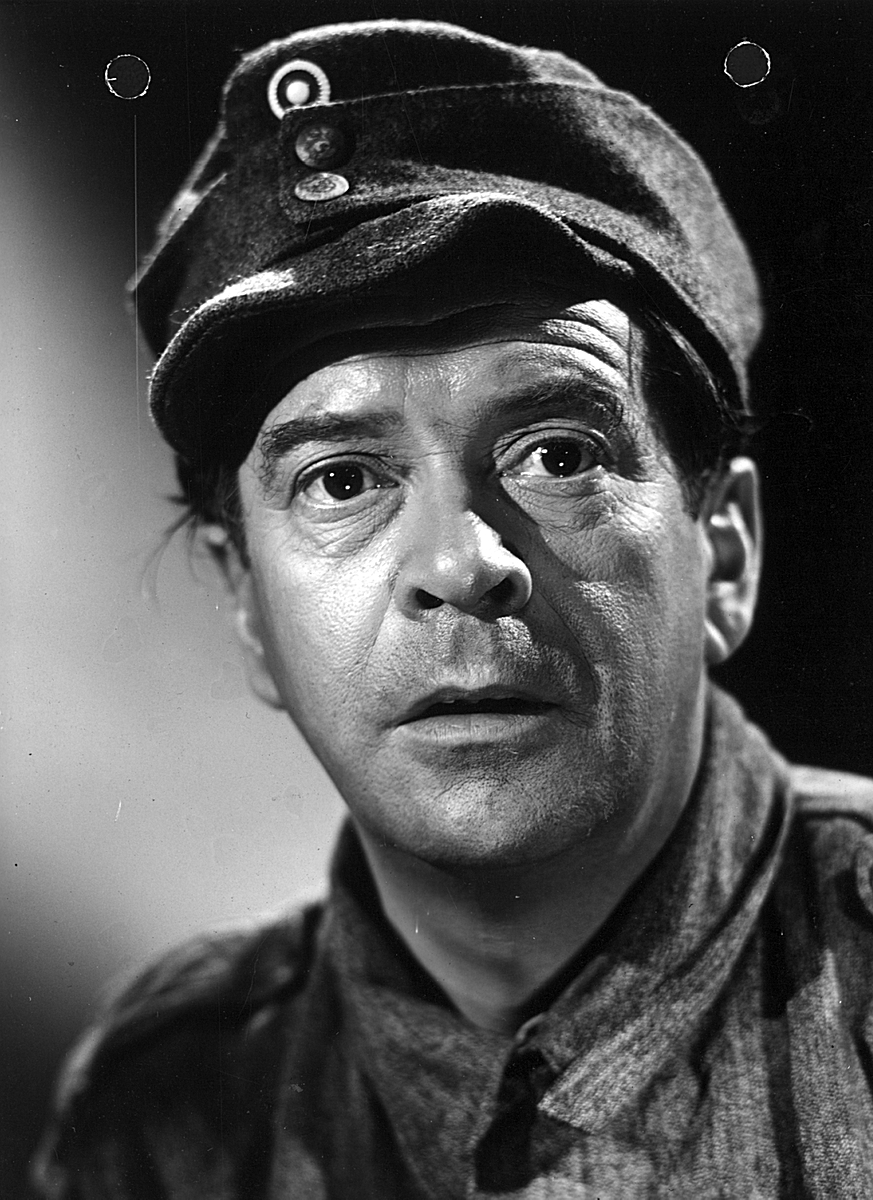
- Kaarlo Halttunen portrayed soldier Rahikainen in the film The Unknown Soldier (1955)
- Born: 18 August 1909; Lappeenranta, Viipuri Province, Grand Duchy of Finland
- Died: 8 March 1986 (aged 76)
- Occupation: Actor
- Years active: 1933-1970

Kaarlo Halttunen (18 August 1909 – 8 March 1986) was a Finnish actor. He appeared in 87 films and television shows between 1933 and 1970. He starred in the film Yksityisalue, which was entered into the 13th Berlin International Film Festival.

== Selected filmography ==
- Radio tekee murron (1951)
- Radio tulee hulluksi (1952)
- After the Fall of Man (1953)
- The Unknown Soldier (1955)
- 1918 (1957)
- Little Presents (1961)
- Yksityisalue (1962)
- Oppenheimerin tapaus (1967)
