= Tauno Majuri =

Finnish actor

- Born: 31 October 1907; Viipuri, Finland
- Died: 17 October 1980 (aged 72); Helsinki, Finland
- Occupation: Actor
- Years active: 1934-1970 (film)

Tauno Majuri (1907–1980) was a Finnish stage and film actor. He was married to the actress Kaisu Leppänen.

== Selected filmography ==
- The Dead Man Falls in Love (1942)
- The Face in the Mirror (1953)

== Bibliography ==
- Pietari Kääpä. Directory of World Cinema: Finland. Intellect Books, 2012.
