= Osmo Harkimo =

Finnish cinematographer

Osmo Uolevi "Ossi" Harkimo (formerly Händelin, 7 October 1923 – 8 April 2007) was a Finnish cinematographer. During his career, he shot more than 40 films. He is best remembered as one of the four cinematographers of the Edvin Laine film The Unknown Soldier (1955), for which he received a Jussi Award. He received another Jussi Award for his work in the Matti Kassila film Sininen viikko (1954).

Since 1961, he worked as a director for the Finnish Broadcasting Company. He also had small acting roles in films such as The Unknown Soldier, Pähkähullu Suomi (1967) and Badding (2000).

Osmo Harkimo was married to Doris Hackman (1929–2023), a descendant of the founder of the Hackman cutlery company. Together they had three children: Roy ("Rolle"), Maria, and businessman Harry "Hjallis" Harkimo.

== Selected filmography as a cinematographer ==
- Intohimon vallassa (1947)
- Isäntä soittaa hanuria (1949)
- Kaunis Veera eli Ballaadi Saimaalta (1950)
- Radio tulee hulluksi (1952)
- Pekka ja Pätkä lumimiehen jäljillä
- Pastori Jussilainen (1955)
- Tuntematon sotilas (1955)
- Juha (1956)
- No Tomorrow (1957)
- Sven Tuuva (1958)
- Lasisydän (1959)
- Isaskar Keturin ihmeelliset seikkailut (1960)
- Lapualaismorsian (1967)
- Laulu tulipunaisesta kukasta (1971)
