= Teuvo Tulio =

Finnish actor (1912–2000)

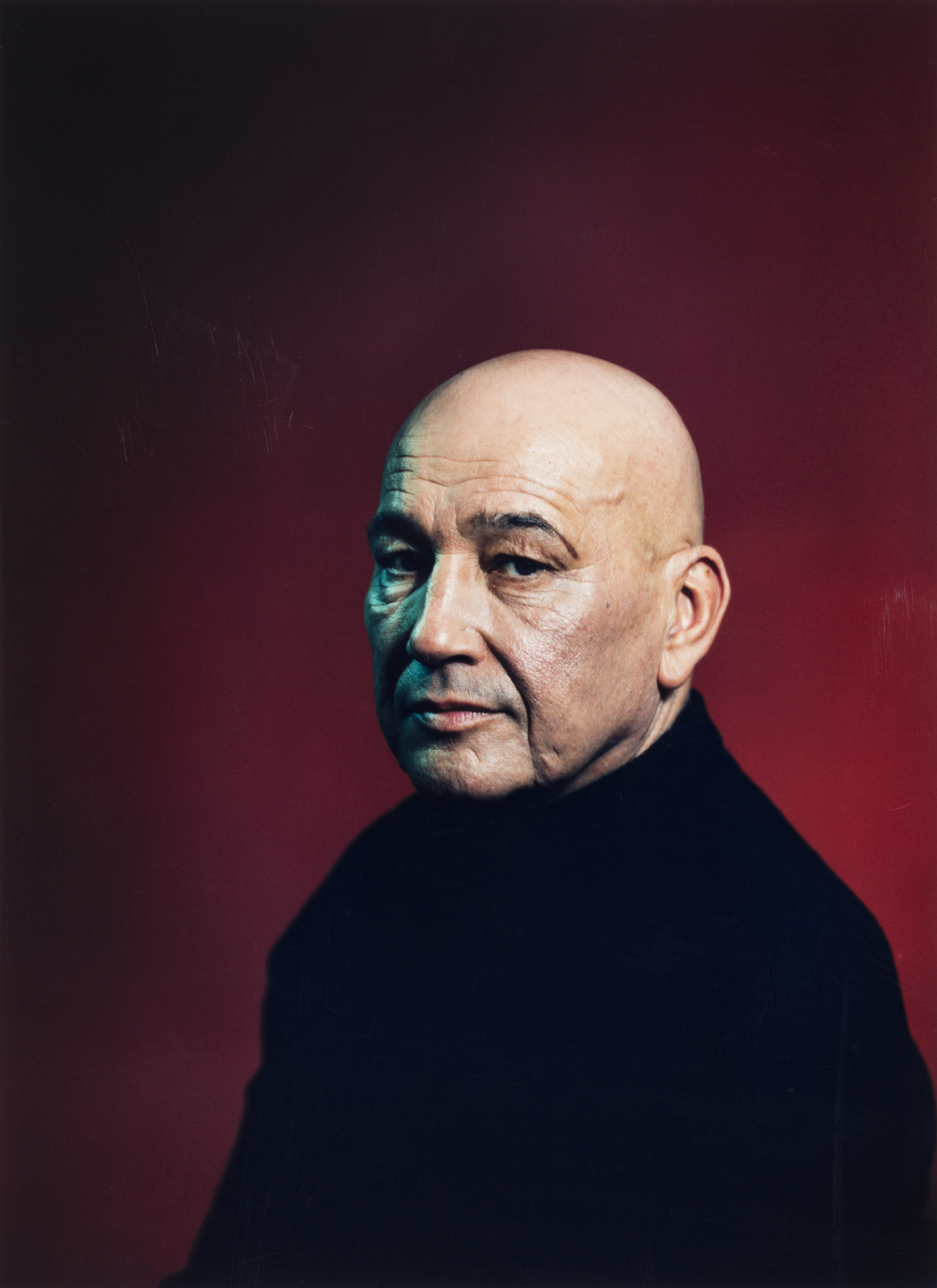
- Tulio in 1973
- Born: Theodor Antonius Tugai; 23 August 1912; Rēzekne, Vitebsk Governorate, Russian Empire (present-day Latvia)
- Died: 8 June 2000 (aged 87); Helsinki, Finland
- Occupations: Actor, film director
- Years active: 1929–1972

Theodor Antonius Tugai (23 August 1912 – 8 June 2000), better known as Teuvo Tulio, was a Finnish film director and actor. Beginning his career as an actor at the end of the silent era, Tulio turned to directing and producing in the 1930s. His films are noted for their extremely melodramatic style.

== Biography ==
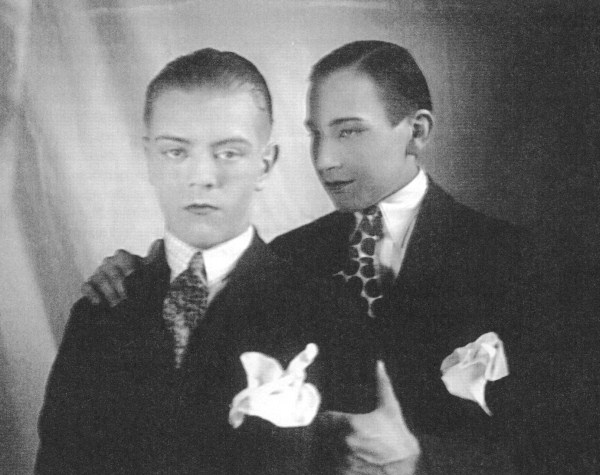
Tulio (right), with Valentin Vaala in the 1920s.

Tulio was born as Theodor Antonius Tugai to a Turkish-Polish father named Aleksander Tugai and a Persian-Latvian mother named Helena Garschin in Rēzekne, in the Vitebsk Governorate of the Russian Empire (present-day Latvia). His mother was an 18-year-old aspiring ballerina when he was born. His parents' marriage was brief, and he spent the early part of his childhood in rural Latvia with his grandparents while his mother pursued a career as a ballerina in St. Petersburg. After his mother married a Finnish man named Alarik Rönnqvist, she sent for him to move to Helsinki in 1922, when he was ten years old.

The family settled in the Katajanokka neighborhood of Helsinki. The move was not easy, however, for a boy accustomed to rural life. Theodor spoke Latvian, Russian and German, but was unable to speak Finnish and Swedish, which were spoken in Helsinki. Other children taunted him for his appearance, due to his mixed-ethnic heritage, and he later recalled that he was involved in many physical altercations.

In his teens, he befriended Valentin Vaala, three years older, after they met at an ice rink. Both were students at Helsinki's Russian-language Tabunov School and both were avid cinema goers who were fans of Charlie Chaplin and adventure films. At age fourteen, Tugai was the star of Vaala's film Mustat silmät (Black Eyes), which was completed in 1929. Due to his "exotic" appearance, the young Tugai was sometimes referred to as Finland's answer to Rudolph Valentino.

In 1936 he changed his name to the more Finnish Teuvo Tulio. His first work as director was the 1936 film Taistelu Heikkilän talosta (Fight over the Heikkila Mansion), starring Regina Linnanheimo. Linnanheimo would become Tulio's lifelong companion, though the two were never married. She acted as the leading lady in many of his films and co-wrote the screenplays for six of his features, including his last film, 1973's Sensuela. Linnanheimo wrote the screenplay to Rikollinen nainen (The Crooked Woman) and to Olet mennyt minun vereeni (You've Gone in My Blood).

Altogether, Tulio directed 15 feature films, three of which were destroyed in a fire in 1959. Parts of two of the films have been found in 2007 and in 2015.

=== Later influence and reputation ===
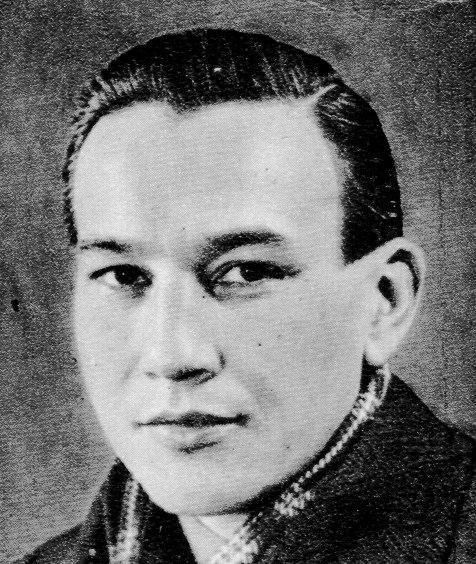
Tulio in the 1930s.

Tulio's films were an influence on the Finnish filmmaker Aki Kaurismäki, whose admiration brought the filmmaker international attention later in his life. In 2008 and 2009, short retrospectives of his work were held in the United States at the Brooklyn Academy of Music and the Pacific Film Archive. Covering the former for the Village Voice, film critic J. Hoberman wrote: "At once arty and artless, stark and fulsome, Cine Tulio is characterized by an exaggerated emotional intensity and an equally primal lack of self-consciousness ... His movies are desperate and insistent, sometimes clumsy but never less than forceful. Tulio's strenuous lyricism allows the objective correlative to run wild."

In a brief essay on the filmmaker for the English-language film website The Auteurs, Anna Bak-Kvapil referred to Tulio's work as "spectacles of suffering and sex," writing: "His style can be Eisensteinian, with expressionistic montages of the shining faces of the proletariat intercut with kittens, crucifixes, or half-smoked cigarettes, but he adores Hollywood, mimicking in his own over-enthusiastic way, Cukor, Lubitsch and Von Sternberg."

== Filmography ==
=== Director ===
- Taistelu Heikkilän talosta (Fight over the Heikkila Mansion, 1936), a part of a copy found in 2007
- Nuorena nukkunut (Silja – Fallen Asleep When Young, 1937), a part of a copy found in the archives of La Cinémathèque Franҫaise in 2015
- Kiusaus (Temptation, 1938), all copies destroyed in fire in 1959
- The Song of the Scarlet Flower (Laulu tulipunaisesta kukasta, 1938)
- Vihtori ja Klaara (Victor and Clara, based on the comic strip "Bringing up Father", 1939)
- In the Fields of Dreams (Unelma karjamajalla, 1940)
- The Way You Wanted Me (Sellaisena kuin sinä minut halusit, 1944) and its Swedish-language version Sådan du ville ha mig (1944)
- Cross of Love (Rakkauden risti, 1946) and its Swedish-language version Kärlekens kors (1946)
- Restless Bood (Levoton veri, 1946) and its Swedish-language version Oroligt blod (1946)
- Intohimon vallassa (In the Grip of Passion, 1947) and its Swedish-language version Olof – forsfararen (1947)
- Hornankoski (The Rapids of Hell, 1949) and its Swedish-language version Forsfararna (1949); co-directed with Roland af Hällström
- Rikollinen nainen (The Crooked Woman, 1952)
- Mustasukkaisuus (Jealousy, 1953) and its Swedish-language version Två kvinnor (alternatively Kvinnorna på forsgården, 1953)
- Olet mennyt minun vereeni (You've Gone into My Blood, 1956)
- Se alkoi omenasta (In the Beginning Was an Apple, 1962)
- Sensuela (1973)

=== Actor ===
- Mustat silmät (1929) as Mustalaispäällikkö Eb-Anzio
- Mustalaishurmaaja (1929) as Manjardo
- Laveata tietä (1931) as Antti Larto alias Anton Lardozo
- Erämaan turvissa (1931) as Lappalainen
- Sininen varjo (1933) as Joel Orma, 'Sininen overall'
- Fredløs (1935) as Paavo (final film role)
