= Regina Linnanheimo =

Finnish actress and screenwriter

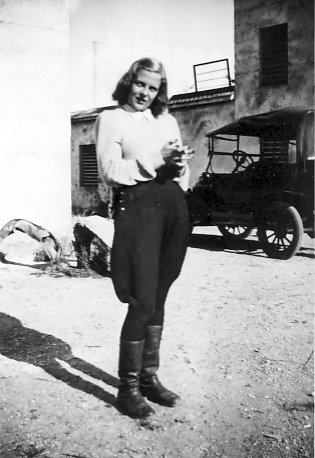
Linnanheimo in 1943

Axa Regina Elisabeth Linnanheimo (until 1924 Leino, since 1948 Regina Mörner, 7 September 1915, Helsinki – 24 January 1995) was a Finnish actress and screenwriter. Her sisters Ragnhild Peitsalo (1896–1931), Elli Ylimaa (1900–1982), and Rakel Linnanheimo (1908–2004) were also actresses. Linnanheimo was married to Count Carl Robert Mörner 1948–1952, until his death. After she ended her film career in 1956, she started to work as a translator for the Finnish Broadcasting Company using the name Regina Mörner.

== Collaborations with Teuvo Tulio ==
Regina Linnanheimo was one of the stars of the so-called Golden Age of Finnish cinema between 1934 and 1939. As a teenager she was a big fan of Greta Garbo and Colleen Moore.

She specialized in romantic and historical costume films and melodramas, such as Kulkurin valssi, Kaivopuiston kaunis Regina and Katariina ja Munkkiniemen kreivi.

On the other hand, Linnanheimo showcased her tendencies for darker undertones in several Teuvo Tulio films. The two collaborated frequently, with Linnanheimo often serving both as an actress and a screenwriter. In 1946, she received a Jussi Award for best actress for Tulio films Levoton veri and Rakkauden risti. The 1956 film Olet mennyt minun vereeni was their final collaboration and also marked the end of Linnanheimo's career in films.

== Selected filmography ==
- Laveata tietä (sv. Den Breda vägen, 1931), silent film
- Helsingin kuuluisin liikemies (sv. Helsingfors främsta affärsman, 1934)
- VMV 6 (The Smugglers, 1935)
- Kun isä tahtoo ... (sv. När pappa vill, 1935)
- Mieheke (The Substitute Husband, 1936)
- Taistelu Heikkilän talosta (The Fight over the Heikkila Mansion, 1936), also one of the screenwriters, parts found in 2007
- Nuorena nukkunut (The Maid Silja, 1937), a sequence found in 2015
- Kiusaus (Temptation, 1938), also the other screenwriter, all copies destroyed in fire in 1959
- Kaivopuiston kaunis Regina (Beautiful Regina of Kaivopuisto, 1941)
- Kulkurin valssi (The Vagabond's Waltz, 1941)
- Katariina ja Munkkiniemen kreivi (Catherine and Count of Munkkiniemi, 1943)
- The Dead Man Loses His Temper (1944)
- Linnaisten vihreä kamari (The Green Chamber of the Linnais Manor, 1945)
- Rakkauden risti (Cross of Love, 1946) and its Swedish-language version Kärlekens kors (1946)
- Levoton veri (Restless Blood, 1946) and its Swedish-language version Oroligt blod (1946)
- Intohimon vallassa (In the Grip of Passion, 1947) and its Swedish-language version Olof – forsfararen (1947)
- Hornankoski (The Rapids of Hell, 1949) and its Swedish-language version Forsfararna (1949)
- Rikollinen nainen (The Crooked Woman, 1952), also the screenwriter
- Mustasukkaisuus (Jealousy, 1953) and its Swedish-language version Två kvinnor (alternatively Kvinnorna på forsgården, 1953)
- Olet mennyt minun vereeni (You've Gone in My Blood, 1956), also the screenwriter
