= Tauno Marttinen =

Finnish composer (1912–2008)

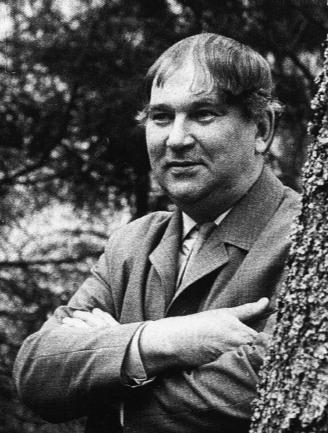
Tauno Marttinen in the mid-1960s.

Tauno Olavi Marttinen (27 September 1912 – 18 July 2008) was a Finnish composer of contemporary classical music.

Born in Helsinki, Marttinen studied in Viipuri and Helsinki. His earliest works are mainly late romantic. His output includes ten symphonies, concertos for various instruments, operas, chamber music, and ballets, among others. In 1965, Marttinen was awarded a Pro Finlandia medal.

Marttinen was named a professor by the president Urho Kekkonen in 1972. A long-time resident of Hämeenlinna, the composer spent his last years in Turenki.

The only international foundation "Tauno Marttisen Kunniaksi" (Foundation in honouring Tauno Marttinen) is located in The Netherlands, with Leeuwarden as residence.

== Selected works ==
Symphonies

- Symphony no. 1, Op. 2 (1958)
- Symphony no. 2, Op. 4 (1959)
- Symphony no. 3, Op. 18 (1960–62)
- Symphony no. 4, Op. 31 (1964)
- Symphony no. 5, Shaman, op. 35 (1967–72)
- Symphony no. 6, Op. 92 (1974–75)
- Symphony no. 7, Op. 136 (1977)
- Symphony no. 8, Op. 224 (1983)
- Symphony no. 9, Op. 260 (1986–88)
- Symphony no. 10 (1998)

Other orchestral works

- Linnunrata (The Milky Way) op. 7 (1960–61)
- Fauni, op. 26 (1965)
- Panu, tulen jumala op. 28 (1966)
- Manalan linnut op. 38 (1964)
- Parnassus for wind band op. 41/2 (1967)
- Mont Saint Michel op. 42 (1968)
- Vanha linna op. 49 (1969–70)
- Pentalia op. 50 (1969)
- Pohjolaisia for wind band op. 76 (1973)
- Yö linnakkeessa for wind band op. 150 (1978)
- Elegia for harp and strings op. 169 (1979)
- Voces Polaris op. 173 (1979)
- Sirius for wind band op. 181/2 (1984)
- Väinämöisen synty op. 201 (1981)
- Pohjolan neiti op. 213/1 (1982)
- Väinämöisin lähtö Pohjolaan 213/2 (1984)
- Concerto Grosso op. 216/2 (1983)
- Profeetta op. 234 (1984)
- Concerto for wind band op. 241/2 (1984)
- Matka aamun maahan for string orchestra (1984)
- Tiibetiläinen fantasia op. 250 (1985)
- Surumarssi for wind band op. 291 (1978)
- Lemminkäisen lähtö Pohjolaan op. 312 (1990)
- Maailman synty (1966)

Concertos

- Rembrandt, op. 11 for cello and orchestra (1962)
- Violin concerto, op. 13 (1962)
- Piano concerto no. 1 op. 23 (1964)
- Cello concerto Dalai lama op. 30 (1966/79)
- Bassoon concerto op. 40 (1971/83–84)
- Flute concerto no. 1 op. 72 (1972)
- Piano concerto no. 2 op. 74 (1972)
- Clarinet concerto Hirvenhiihto op. 89 (1974)
- Hämäläinen rapsodia for piano and orchestra op. 103 (1975)
- Flute concerto no. 2 Concerto espagnole op. 144 (1978)
- Kantele concerto op. 145/2 (1988)
- Fantasia for cello and orchestra op. 154 (1964/78)
- Concertino for accordion and string orchestra op. 171 (1979)
- Piano concerto no. 3 op. 200 (1981)
- Piano concerto no. 4 op. 241/1 (1984)

Chamber music

- Delta for clarinet and piano op. 9 (1962)
- Loitsu for three percussionists op. 15 (1963)
- Alfa for flute and 7 cymbals op. 16 (1963)
- Nonet no. 1 for wind quintet and string quartet op. 19 (1963)
- Nonet no. 2 op. 41/2 (1968)
- Vipusessa käynti for 7 contrabasses op. 44 (1969)
- String quartet no. 1 op. 50 (1969)
- String quartet no. 2 op. 63 (1971)
- Duo for clarinet and percussion op. 66/2 (1971)
- Nonet no. 3 op. 79 (1973)
- Ilmatar, ilman impi for solo piccolo op. 88 (1974)
- Johanneksen ilmestys, fantasia for piccolo trumpet and organ op. 95 (1975)
- Septemalia for 7 contrabasses op. 97 (1975)
- 3 preludes for guitar op. 99/1 (1975)
- Divertimento for oboe and percussion op. 127 (1977)
- Intermezzo for flute and guitar op. 130 (1977)
- Impressio for solo cello op. 140 (1978)
- Piano trio op. 141 (1978)
- Kirinmyllyn tarinaa (The Old Mill) for solo clarinet op. 143 (1978)
- Punainen lanka for accordion op. 145 (1978)
- Duo for viola and piano op. 204 (1981)
- String trio Aube op. 207 (1982)
- String quartet no. 3 op. 228 (1983)
- Kantele sonata op. 233 (1984)
- Metamorfos for bass clarinet and marimba op. 245 (1985)
- Nonet no. 4 op. 248 (1985)
- Isis for cello and guitar op. 256 (1986)
- Soitto for four chromatic kantele op. 264 (1986)
- Osiris for violin and guitar op. 268 (1987)
- Harlekiini for violin and guitar op. 270 (1985)
- Vedenhaltia for piano or guitar trio op. 311 (1996)

Solo Voice

- Aasi ja Satakieli Op. 292 No 4
- Annan laulu lapselleen Op. 296a
- Appelsiinitarhassa Op. 285 No 2
- Drei Lieder Op. 163 (Liederzyklus)
- Elämä – kuin meri Op. 276
- Faunit Op. 251 No 2
- Glück der Liebe Op. 73b No 2
- Joukahaisen äiti
- Jumalien keinu
- Kaksi laulua Eino Leinon runoihin Op. 323
- Kehtolaulu
- Kolme laulua Kantelettaren sanoihin Op. 191
- Kryloviana Op. 292 (Laulusarja)
- Kuoleman yö on lyhyt
- Kutsu matkalle
- Kuutamolla
- Käki ja Kukko Op. 292 No 1
- Lapin lauluja Op. 161 (Laulusarja)
- Lapsifantasioita Op. 146 (Laulusarja)
- Lasimaalaus
- Laulu merestä
- Laulu oravasta
- Liebeslieder der Antike Op. 73 B (Liederzyklus)
- Maisema Op. 285 No 1
- Näktergalen Op. 94b
- Parnasso Op. 292 No 3
- Pohjolan tytär Op. 148
- Purppuralaiva
- Rannalla Op. 47 No 1
- Ristirauta Op. 2 No 6
- Sadun keiju
- Satama Op. 47 No 3
- Simeoni saapasnahkatornissa Op. 78
- Sinä
- Sydämeni laulu
- Tule, tuuli
- Varastettu hevonen
- Yö ylhäinen
- Yön musiikki
- Yölaulu

Solo Piano

- 10 bagatelles op. 8 (1961)
- Titisee op. 22 (1965)
- 4 preludes op. 24 (1965)
- Taara op. 34 (1967)
- Sonatine op. 52 (1970)
- Pääsiäinen op. 66/1 (1971–72)
- Sonata no. 1 op. 90 (1974)
- Kukonaskel for two pianos op. 100 (1975)
- Pisaroita op. 109 (1976)
- Kimalluksia op. 134 (1977)
- Japanilaisessa puutarhassa op. 217 (1982–83)
- Puro vuorella op. 221 (1983)
- Faustus op. 269 (1987)

Organ

- Alussa oli sana Op. 95 (1975)
- Intrada Op. 36 (1967)
- Kupoli for organ and tam-tam Op. 65 (1971)
- Larghetto
- Largo religioso Op. 187 (1980)
- Muunnelmia lappajärveläisestä hengellisestä sävelmästä Op. 252
- Notre Dame Op. 59 (1970)
- Orgelstück Op. 70 (1972)
- Preludi Op. 158 (1978)
- Profeetta Op. 234b (1984)
- Urkufantasia B-A-C-H Op. 84 (1974/82)
- Urkukoraali SVK 115 "Työn, Jeesus, täytit raskahan"

Operas

- Neiti Gamardin talo op. 12 (Honoré de Balzac, 1960/71)
- Päällysviitta op. 17 (Nikolai Gogol, 1963, television premiere 1965)
- Kihlaus op. 20 (Aleksis Kivi, 1964)
- Tulitikkuja lainaamassa op. 25 (Maiju Lassila, 1966)
- Lea op. 33 (Aleksis Kivi, 1967, Turku 1968)
- Poltettu oranssi op. 41 (Eeva-Liisa Manner, 1968, Salzburg 1971)
- Mestari Patelin op. 69 (composer; based on French story, 1970–74, Hämeenlinna 1983)
- Järvelän Santra op. 76 (Teuvo Pakkala, 1972)
- Psykiatri op. 93 (composer, 1974–75, Bayreuth 1975)
- Noitarumpu (formerly Laestadiuksen saarna) op. 85 (Nilla Outakoski, 1974–76, Oulu 1976)
- Meedio op. 105 (composer, 1975–76, Hämeenlinna 1978)
- Jaarlin sisar op. 126 (Veikko Isomäki, 1977, Hämeenlinna 1979)
- Hilda Husso op. 175 (Maria Jotuni, 1979)
- Faaraon kirje op. 192 (Erkki Mutru, 1978–82, Tampere 1982)
- Suuren joen laulu (formerly Najadi) (Taisto Yrjänä, 1980, Kemi 1982)
- Häät op. 244 (Anton Tšehov, 1984)
- Hölmöläisooppera op. 261 (composer, 1986–87, Kerava 1987)
- Seitsemän veljestä (Seven Brothers) op. 263 (Aleksis Kivi, 1987)
- Noidan kirous op. 273 (Erkki Mutru, 1987)
- Veljesten myöhemmät vaiheet (Aleksis Kivi, 1989)
- Minna Graucher op. 280 (1992–93)
- Mooses op. 309 (Erkki Mutru)

Ballets

- Tikkaat (The Ladder) op. 21 (1965)
- Dorian Grayn muotokuva (The Portrait of Dorian Gray) op. 48 (1969)
- Lumikuningatar (The Snow Queen) op. 54 (1970)
- Beatrice op. 57 (1970, Finnish National Opera 1972)
- Ruma ankanpoikanen (The Ugly Duckling) op. 115 (1976/82–83)
- Päivänpäästö op. 120 (1975–77/83, Tampere 1985)
