= Tienhaara =

Finnish built-up area near Vyborg before WW2

Coordinates: 60.75°N 28.65°E

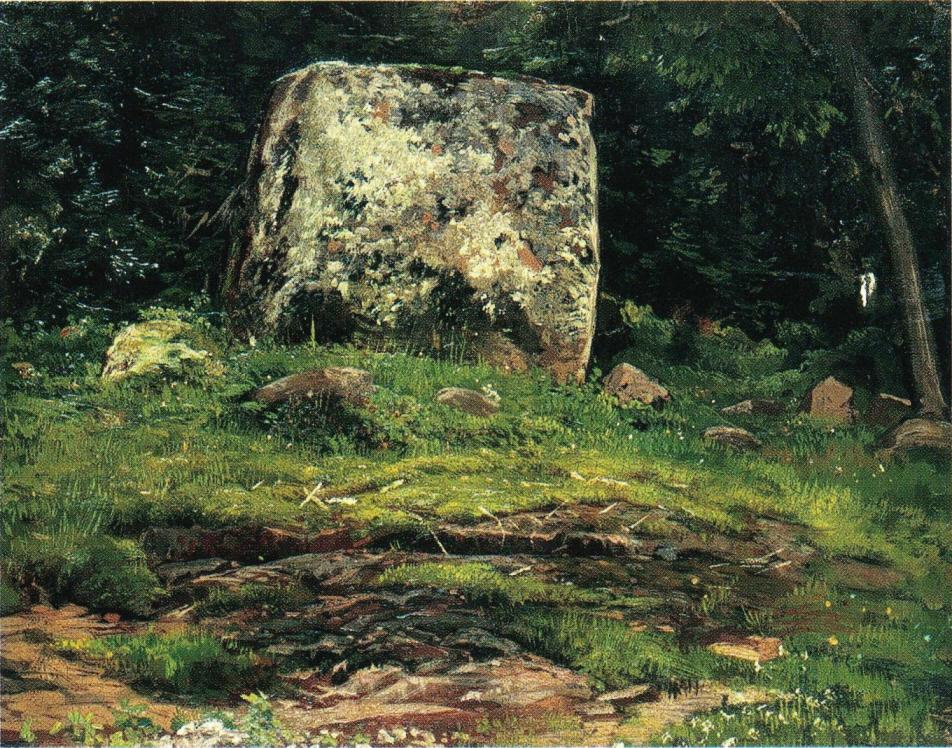
Kasakkakivi of Tienhaara

Tienhaara was a built-up area belonging to the Vyborg municipality, and later a neighborhood of the city of Vyborg from 1933 to 1944, just west from the city and Zashchitnaya Bay. It was located where the highway running west from Vyborg diverges. The southern branch, the former King's Road, leads to Helsinki and Turku, with the northern one leading to Lappeenranta. The crossroads had formed around a large glacial erratic called Kasakkakivi.

== History ==
According to oral accounts there were signs of prehistoric graves and settlements, found in the early 1900s, in the area of Tienhaara. From the Middle Ages to the 1800s people largely lived near the various mansions around the area. The construction of the Saimaa Canal and the Riihimäki–Saint Petersburg railway at the middle of the 1800s lead to the settlement of the current Tienhaara area, both due to the construction work created by these projects, and the flow mainly passenger and goods traffic to Vyborg and Saint Petersburg enabled by the new rail link.

In addition, the construction of fortifications during the First World War 1914-1917 period and the expansion of the Saimaa Canal between 1927 and 1939 were sources of employment for many residents of Tienhaara. Also, Tienhaara's position at the crossroad of four roads lead to further growth as highway traffic grew after the Independence of Finland from Russia.

The Ykspää grammar school (kansakoulu), founded to commemorate 25 years of Alexander II's rule in 1880, fuctioned as the school for Tienhaara until 1939.

For the majority of the Finnish Civil War Tienhaara was under the control of the Reds. The Whites did try to unsuccessfully attack Tienhaara, firing over 700 rounds of indirect fire. In the end, the Reds did retreat from Tienhaara due to gains made by the Whites north and east of Vyborg, leading to the Battle of Naulasaari.

Tienhaara was merged as a neighborhood to the city of Vyborg in 1933.

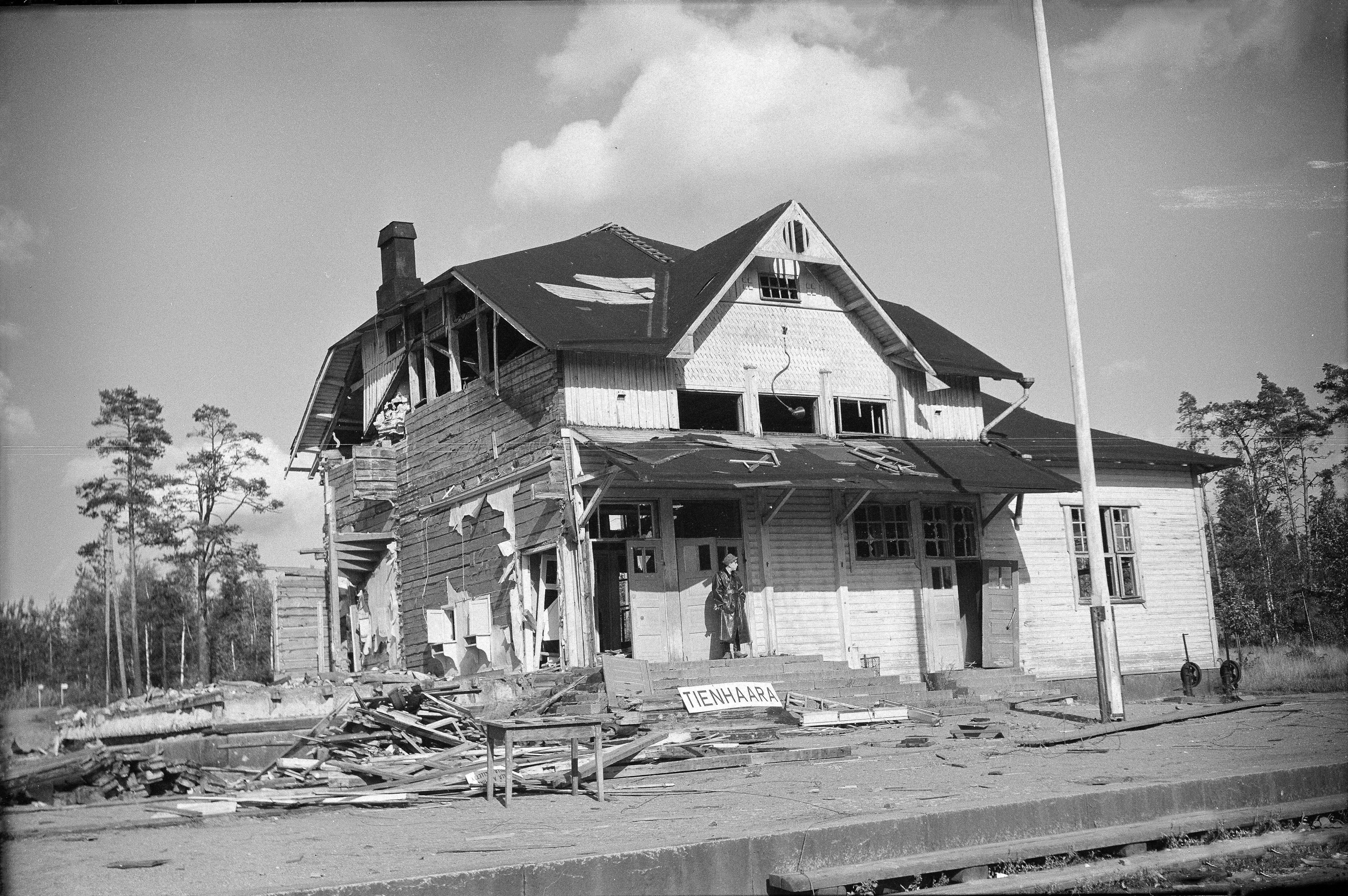
The Tienhaara train station damaged by the Soviets in 1944

At the later stages of the Continuation War Tienhaara functioned as an important gathering point for the evacuation of the Karelian Isthmus after the bombing of the railyard at Maaskola in Vyborg. Between the 22nd and 25th of June 1944 the Battle of Tienhaara occurred in the area of Tienhaara. A memorial plaque, commemorating the battle, was attached to the Kasakkakivi in 1994.

Presently Tienhaara is the center of the Russian settlement of Seleznyovo.

== Businesses ==
Among the many businesses that operated in Tienhaara before the Second World War were Tienhaaran Auto Oy, one of the 18 biggest bus companies in Finland at the end of the 1930s, the Suur-Merijoki Airfield, Tienhaaran Kattohuopateollisuus Oy, Tienhaaran Valssimylly which was more commonly known as Bayer's mill, and Karjalan Mylly Oy known for the Elovena brand. There was also a postal office located in Tienhaara.

== Famous residents ==
- Elga Sesemann, painter
- Mikko von Deringer, conductor
- Matti Poutvaara, photographer
- Joel Räsänen, painter and graphic artist
- Aila Silventoinen, actress
- Topi Valkonen, painter and graphic artist
