= Södergren =

Södergren is a Swedish ornamental surname, which means "south branch", from the elements söder ("south") and gren ("branch"). Alternative spellings include Södergren, Sødergren, Sodergren, and Soedergren. The name may refer to:

- Anders Södergren (born 1977), Swedish cross-country skier
- Benny Södergren (born 1948), Swedish cross-country skier
- Evert Sodergren (1920–2013), American furniture maker
- Håkan Södergren (born 1959), Swedish ice hockey player

== See also ==
- Söderblom (disambiguation)
- Söderholm
- Zederbaum
