= Joel Räsänen =

Finnish artist (1905–1978)

Joel Viktor Räsänen
- Born: 7 August 1905; Viipuri, Grand Duchy of Finland, Russian Empire
- Died: 19 November 1978 (aged 73); Espoo, Finland
- Education: Viipurin Taiteenystäväin piirustuskoulu, Academy of Fine Arts Leipzig
- Parents: Matti Räsänen (father); Lydia Räsänen (née Haukinen) (mother)

Joel Viktor Räsänen (7 August 1905 – 19 November 1978) was a Finnish painter and graphic artist who also worked as a commercial artist, illustrator, and art teacher.

Räsänen was born to Matti Räsänen, a foreman, and Lydia Räsänen (née Haukinen) in Viipuri in the Grand Duchy of Finland. He went to grammar school (kansakoulu) and then studied art at the Viipurin Taiteenystäväin piirustuskoulu art school between 1919 and 1924. He trained further outside of Finland, at the Academy of Fine Arts Leipzig in Germany 1926–1927 and by making a study tour to Sweden, Norway, and Denmark in 1938. Before the Second World War he lived in Tienhaara, a neighbourhood of Viipuri.

His works were first publicly shown at an exhibition held in Viipuri in 1926. He participated in Finnish joint exhibitions; the Youth Exhibition (Nuorten näyttely) in 1939, 1940, 1943, Artists' Association of Finland exhibitions in 1941, 1942, 1943, 1945, 1948, 1949, 1950, 1951 and 1953, and the Fine Arts Academy of Finland triennial exhibition in 1950. He held a solo exhibition in Helsinki in 1946. Outside of Finland, exhibitions of Finnish art he participated in were in Göteborg Sweden in 1939, Oslo Norway, Göteborg, and Stockholm in 1940. His works belong to the collections of Vyborg Art Museum and Lahti Art Museum. Räsänen worked as an art teacher at the department of graphic design at the Taideteollinen oppilaitos from 1953 to 1968. He was selected as a member of the Artists' Association of Finland in 1940. He was also a member of the Finnish Painters' Union, Viipurin taiteilijaseura (Viipuri Artists' Association), and Suomen Piirtäjäliitto (Finnish Drawer Union).

Räsänen was the original illustrator for the consumer packaging for Elovena as he won the advertisement competition held by the original manufacturers of Elovena, Karjalan mylly, in 1925. The so-called Elovena-maiden which he created is still in use as of 2026, although with major modifications over the years.
