= 61st Infantry Regiment (Finland) =

- 61st Infantry Regiment insignia
- Active: 17 June 1941 – 15 November 1944
- Country: Republic of Finland
- Branch: Finnish Army
- Type: Regiment
- Role: Infantry
- Part of: Finnish 17th Division
- Engagements: Continuation War

Commanders
- Notable commanders: Col Martin Berg; Lt Col Nils Roos; Col Alpo K. Marttinen

The 61st Infantry Regiment (IR61) was a combat regiment of the Finnish Army's 17th Division during the Second World War, consisting almost exclusively of Swedish-speaking Finns. Among others, the regiment participated in the battle of Tienhaara. The regiment has been the subject of several books, as well as a feature film Beyond the Front Line. In 1980, Lieutenant general A. E. Martola opined:

"To be honest, this regiment saved Finland during the midsummer weekend 1944, even if only temporarily."

== Continuation War ==
The Continuation War (Finnish: jatkosota, Swedish: fortsättningskriget, 25 June 1941 – 19 September 1944) was the second of two wars fought between Finland and the Soviet Union during World War II. Acts of war between the Soviet Union and Finland started on 22 June 1941, the day Germany launched its invasion of the Soviet Union. Open warfare started with a Soviet air offensive on 25 June. Subsequent Finnish operations undid its post-Winter War cessations on the Karelian Isthmus and Ladoga Karelia, and captured East Karelia by September 1941. On the Karelian Isthmus, the Finns froze their offensive 30 km from Leningrad, where the pre-World War II border of the Soviet Union and Finland ran. Even though Hitler repeatedly asked the Finns to attack Leningrad the Finns did not attack the city, yet they passively participated in the siege by holding their pre-World War II land for two and a half years on the Karelian Isthmus.

== Mobilization ==
A general mobilization was initiated on 17 June 1941 in anticipation of renewed hostilities, and each Military Province was charged with establishing an army division. In the Vaasa Military Province, the 19th Division was established with colonel Hannu Esa Hannuksela as commander. However, the Defense Corps of Ostrobothnia was not incorporated into the 19th Division, but instead established its own regiment: the 61st Infantry Regiment. Jäger Movement Colonel Rafael Berg was appointed as commanding officer.

== Combat history ==
=== The Battles of Säntämä ===
As part of the advance of the Finnish 17th Division, the 61st Infantry Regiment first advanced past the old border line in August 1941 and broke through enemy lines at the battle of Säntämä between 18 August 1941 and 7 September 1941. After this, the regiment continued its advance into Soviet territory, encountering only light defense by the Soviet forces.

=== The Battles of Svir and Jandeba ===
The regiment crossed the Svir River on 21 September 1941, where it overcame heavy resistance by Soviet forces. Subsequently, it advanced towards the Jandeba River, though under continued heavy fighting.

=== Shemenski and Podporoze ===
After crossing the Jandeba River, the 61st Regiment advanced towards the area of the village of Shemenski and city of Podporoze, where it entered into trench warfare and remained for a period of more than two years until May 1944. The city of Podporoze was occupied by the 61st Infantry Regiment from 12 December 1941 until 30 January 1942, when it was moved back to the Shemenski area to relieve the Finnish 34th Infantry Regiment.

=== The Russian Spring Offensive in 1942 ===
At the beginning of 1942, the Soviet 7th Army was facing the Finnish 17th Division in the Svir area. The 61st Regiment was located at the east, opposite the Soviet 114th Infantry Division. Towards the end of March, the Soviet Army concentrated their forces, and launched its Spring Offensive at the start of April 1942. The objective was to force the retreat of the Finnish Army across the Svir River and capture a bridgehead for continued advance towards the old frontier. The gravity point of the attack was in an 18 kilometer wide arch headed by the Soviet 21st Division and the Soviet 69th Marine Infantry Brigade, and supported in the flank by the Soviet 114th Infantry Division. The main Soviet advance soon encountered fierce resistance, requiring the Soviet 114th Division to be thrown into the main line of attack, after which the Soviet forces managed to break through the Finnish lines between Shemenski and Pertjärvi. As preparation for a Finnish counterattack, a major Finnish combat unit was formed on 17 April, of which the 61st Infantry Regiment was a key component. The Finnish counterattack was launched on 19 April and by 22 April all the Soviet forces that had advanced through the Finnish lines between Shemenski and Pertjärvi had been annihilated. The Finnish Army suffered losses of 2,165 men, while the Soviet 7th Army suffered losses of just under 12,800 men.

=== Trench Warfare 1942–1944 ===
Despite labeled as a period of "trench warfare", a state of continuous active warfare signified this period. Constant patrols into enemy territory, artillery barrage and readiness to counterattack, characterized this phase of the war. Specialized patrol troops were formed, some of which achieved almost legendary fame within the regiment. An example was the patrol unit led by lieutenant Harry Järv, who made more than two hundred combat patrols into the no man's land between the opposing forces in 1942 and 1943, before being severely wounded and repatriated to the home front.

Subsequent to the change of commander from lieutenant colonel Nils Roos to lieutenant colonel Alpo Marttinen, a fierce combat took place around the hills of Teeri-Kukkula, when Russian forces attacked the positions of IR61 between 8 November until 20 November 1942. At a critical moment on 10 November, when the Finnish line wavered, Marttinen personally took charge of a counterattack, halting any retreating soldiers, and with a drawn pistol commanding: We do not yield an inch! Attack! Officers first! Men, follow me!, successfully halting the advancing Russian troops. The commander of the 17th Division, Alonzo Sundman, moved several reserve units into battle positions, and a battle unit was formed under Major General Ruben Lagus. Some terrain was lost at the conclusion of this Russian offensive, and this terrain could not have been retaken without significant air and tank support. The commander-in-chief, field marshal Mannerheim, therefore decided, on the advice of major general Lennart Oesch, to not attempt to recapture the lost terrain. As the first significant battle the appointment of Marttinen as commander of IR61, it also served to cement mutual respect and trust between the regiment and its new commander.

A second main battle was fought around the hill of Teeri between 26 October and 28 October 1943. This battle became well known within the Finnish high command due to a daring counterattack executed by volunteers under the command of captain Renvall, rolling up the entrenched Russian forces on the Teeri hill and forcing them to blow up their own munition supplies.

=== Reserve Duties 22 May 1944 – 16 June 1944 ===
After more than two years at the front, IR61 was relieved of duty on 22 May 1944 and placed in reserve, behind the line held by the 5th Division, in the area of Kinkijeva-Ontroila-Karelskaja.

Lieutenant-Colonel Marttinen was on leave from his regiment between 1 June 1944 until 8 June 1944, and spent these days touring the Swedish speaking area of Ostrobothnia from where most of the soldiers of IR61 were drafted.

=== Tienhaara and the Soviet Offensive of 1944 ===
The regiment was deployed for defense at Tienhaara, which was located along the coastal highway leading north from Viipuri towards Finland, on the shore of Kivisillansalmi on 22 June relieving the worn out troops. Having strong artillery support and support of Detachment Kuhlmey the regiment was able to keep the Tienhaara region including the Kivisillansalmi while defending against repeated attacks by at least two Soviet divisions of the 108th Corps supported by strong artillery. At the conclusion of the battle on 25 June Marttinen was promoted to colonel.

== Commanders ==
The following officers commanded the 61st Infantry Regiment:

- June 1941 – September 1941: Colonel M. R. Berg
- September 1941 – October 1942: Lieutenant Colonel N. T. Roos
- October 1942 – October 1944: Lieutenant Colonel A. K. Marttinen
- October 1944 – October 1944: Major G. R. Renvall
- October 1944 – November 1944: Major B. F. Lagerbohm

== Bibliography ==
- Vasa krigsveterandistrikt - Vaasan sotaveteraanipiiri r.f., debate in the Vasabladet newspaper 1987–1988, redacted by Harry Järv: "Finland 1939-1945" (ISBN 952-90041-4-1)
- Nykvist, Nils-Erik: "Sextiettan, Infanteriregimente 61, 1941-1944" (ISBN 951-52-2333-4)
- Stenström, Lars: "Krigsvägar, Finlandsvenska krigsförband 1939-44" (ISBN 951-52-1553-6)
- Raunio, Ari: "De militära operationerna, De finska krigen 1939-45" (ISBN 978-951-593-080-4)
- Piekalkiewicz, Janusz: "Der Zweite Welkrieg" (ISBN 3-89350-544-X)
- Halén, Harry et al.: "Mannerheim : officer i det kejserliga Rysslands armé, marskalk av det självständiga Finland" (ISBN 951-97072-4-7)
- Roberts, Martin: "The New Barbarism – A Portrait of Europe 1900–1973" (ISBN 978-0-19-913225-6)
- Mäkelä, Jukka L.: "Strider i fjärrkarelen - Oskus fjärrpatruller, rök över Aunus" (ISBN 951-50-1383-6)
- West, Kurt: "Vi slogs och blödde - ung finlandssvensk soldat i IR61" (ISBN 951-9016-24-4)
- Sandström, Allan: "Den falska freden: Finlands kamp för oberoende 1944-1948" (ISBN 951-550-501-1)
- Lehtonen, Marja-Liisa: "Adolf Ehrnrooth - Generalens testamente" (ISBN 951-52-2177-3)
- Meinander, Henrik: "Finlands historia" (ISBN 978-95-1522-408-8)
