= Beyond the Front Line =

- Theatrical release poster
- Swedish: Framom främsta linjen
- Finnish: Etulinjan edessä
- Directed by: Åke Lindman
- Screenplay by: Stefan Forss; Benedict Zilliacus
- Produced by: Alf Hemming
- Starring: Ilkka Heiskanen; Tobias Zilliacus
- Cinematography: Pauli Sipiläinen
- Edited by: Sakari Kirjavainen
- Music by: Lasse Mårtenson
- Production company: Åke Lindman Film-Production
- Distributed by: Buena Vista International
- Release date: 5 March 2004
- Country: Finland
- Languages: Swedish; Finnish
- Budget: €3.5 million
- Box office: €668,448 (domestic)

Beyond the Front Line (Swedish: Framom främsta linjen, Finnish: Etulinjan edessä) is a 2004 Finnish war film directed by Åke Lindman. The film is based on the diaries of Swedish-speaking Finnish soldiers who served in the Continuation War from 1942 to 1944. The film premiered in Finland on March 5, 2004 and in Sweden on April 2, 2004.

== Plot ==
The film tells the story of the Continuation War between the Soviet Union and Finland and takes place from 1942 to 1944. The Swedish-speaking Infantry Regiment 61 takes part in the fighting in East Karelia. During the summer of 1944, the regiment is regrouped to the Karelian Isthmus where they fight off the Soviet attack at Tienhaara northwest of Vyborg.

== Cast ==
- Tobias Zilliacus as Harry Järv
- Ilkka Heiskanen as Alpo Marttinen
- Christoffer Weiss as Allan Finholm
- Kim Gustafsson as Björk
- Martin Bahne as Lindblad
- Carl-Gustaf Wentzel as Forss
- Jan-Christian Söderholm as Helén
- Sampo Sarkola as Kaustinen
- Johan Rönneholm as Händig
- Joachim Thibblin as Söderman
- Oskar Silén as Mattas
- Paavo Kerosuo as Bror Östman
- Patrick Henriksen as Rosenlöf
- Peter Kanerva as Olof Fagerström
- Jan Korander as Löfman
- Asko Sarkola as Marshal Mannerheim

== Production ==
On 3 December 2000, director Åke Lindman told Savon Sanomat that since the 1970s he had been thinking about making a film about the long-range patrols that defended Finland during the Continuation War. The actual frame story had changed over the years, finally landing on Infantry Regiment 61, which consisted of Finnish Swedes from Ostrobothnia stationed south of the Svir River in 1942–1943.

Three veterans, including Harry Järv, who served in Infantry Regiment 61, were on site as experts during the filming.

The sequel Tali-Ihantala 1944 was already planned since the preparation phase of the first film. The film was to focus on the Battle of Tali-Ihantala and the decisive victory there in June–July 1944. To support both films, the From Svir to the Isthmus Film Support Society was founded, supported by a delegation of Finnish veterans' associations. Funds were also raised from Sweden.

== Screenings ==
The film premiered on 5 March 2004, but six preview screenings were held before that, including at Bio Gran in Kauniainen for the Kauniainen War Injured Hospital comrades and in Pietarsaari for war veterans. The film was seen by 93,576 viewers. The first television screening was on Independence Day 2007 on FST5.

== Reception ==
The film received mixed reviews. “Åke Lindman’s great work is revealed as a dramatic documentary, in which the director and his actors meticulously reconstruct the eyewitness accounts of those who gave their all “out there” into a non-passionate but emotionally moving frontline report,” was the review of the film by Hannu Björkbacka in Keskipohjanmaa . According to Tapani Maskula in Turun Sanomat, “As interesting as Järv and Marttinen must be, they remain only faceless tin soldiers in a report with a dry dramaturgy.” According to Johanna Laurila in Katso, “The film is gray in its depiction, even in summer, washed out of color. The systematic stylistic device brings to mind the dullness of war that is indifferent to the seasons, but in a film that is over two hours long, it also emphasizes the flatness of the drama.”
