= Battle of Tienhaara =

Battle between Finland and the USSR

Coordinates: 60.7445°N 28.680°E

- Part of the Continuation War
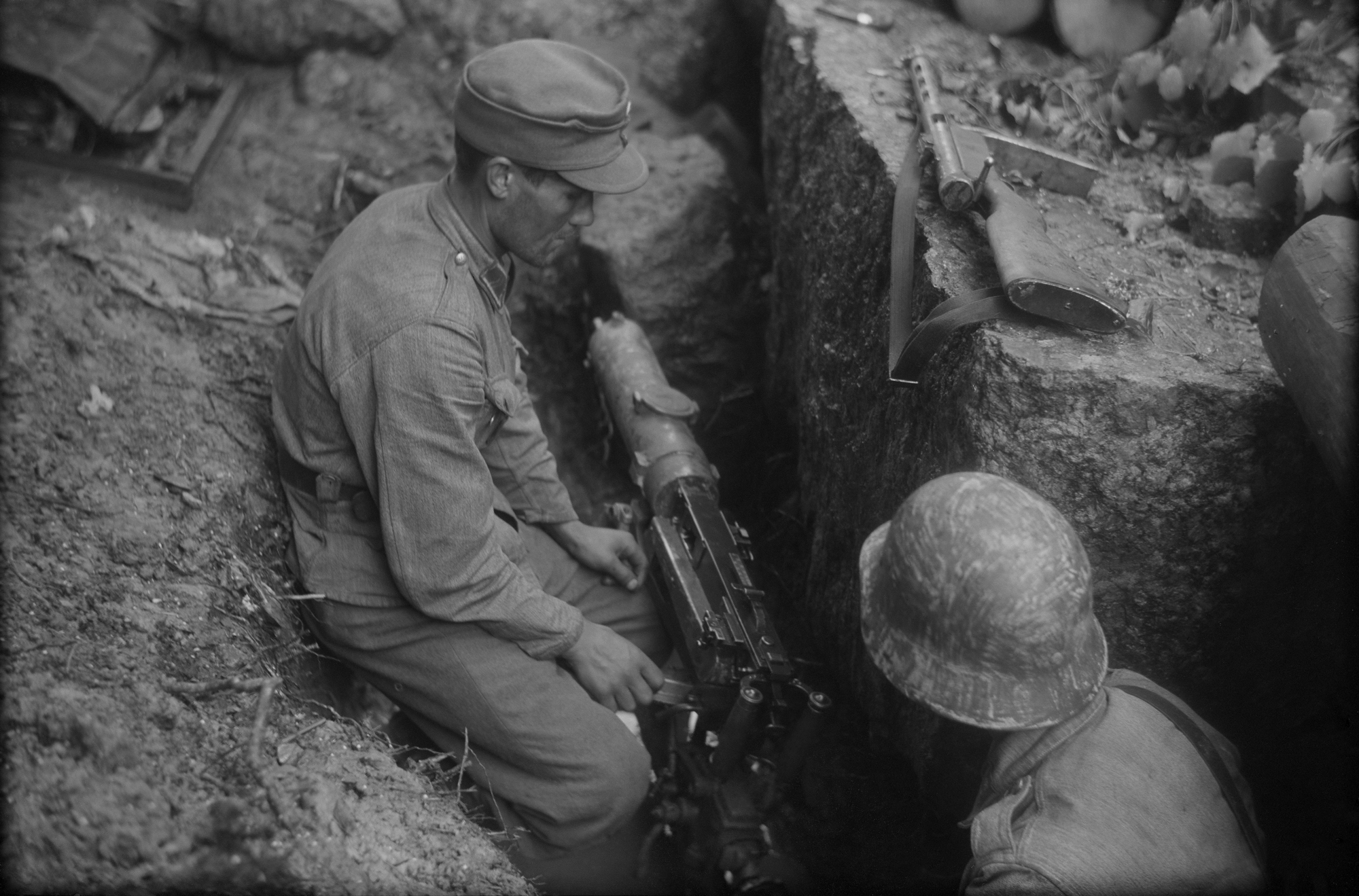
- Finnish machine gunners at Tienhaara, June 25, 1944
Date	June 22, 1944
Location	Karelian Isthmus
Result	Finnish victory

Belligerents
Finland	Soviet Union

Commanders and leaders
Karl Lennart Oesch; Alpo Marttinen	Dmitry Gusev; Mikhail Tikhonov

The Battle of Tienhaara was a part of Continuation War between Finland and the Soviet Union fought north of Viipuri on June 22, 1944, after the Red Army had captured Viipuri. Having lost Viipuri, the Finns concentrated their defense to the Tienhaara region which offered favourable area for defense with nearby waterway cutting the already narrow battlefield into several islands.

== Background ==
Soviet 1944 offensive had started on June 10, 1944 and in matter of days broke through of the fortified Finnish defense lines in southern Karelian Isthmus. On June 20 the advancing Soviet forces were already literally on the gates of Viipuri. Finnish 20th Brigade had been transferred to defend the city however it had been inadequately supplied and lacked effective anti-tank weapons as it had neither 7.5 cm Pak 40 anti-tank guns nor knowledge on how to use the few available Panzerfaust or Panzerschreck anti-tank weapons. 20th Brigade was not prepared for Soviet armored assault, led by 108th Corps' 90th Rifle Division supported by 260th Separate Heavy Breakthrough Tank Regiment and 1238th Self-propelled Gun Regiment, and its resistance crumbled swiftly with men fleeing either in panic or under supposed orders to withdraw.

== Battle ==
JR61 (61st Infantry Regiment (Finland)), or 'Sextiettan' (en. 'The Sixty-one') in Swedish as the regiment consisted entirely of Finland Swedes and volunteers from Sweden, under command of Lieutenant Colonel Alpo Marttinen of the Finnish 17th Division (led by Major General Alonzo Sundman) arrived to the Isthmus from Svir immediately after the loss of Viipuri. The regiment was deployed for defense at Tienhaara, which was located along the coastal highway leading north from Viipuri towards the inner of Finland, on the shore of Kivisillansalmi on June 22 relieving the worn out troops. Having strong artillery support and support of the Gefechtsverband Kuhlmey the regiment was able to keep the Tienhaara region including the Kivisillansalmi while defending against repeated attacks by the Soviet 90th and 372nd Rifle Divisions of the 108th Rifle Corps supported by strong artillery. At the conclusion of the battle on June 23 Marttinen was promoted to colonel.

== Aftermath ==
Soviet forces attempted to push north but failed to break through the Finnish lines. The Soviet commander, Marshal Leonid Govorov, decided that further attempts to cross the waterway would be too costly and time-consuming and instead concentrated the bulk of his forces to the Juustila-Ihantala area contributing to the events which led to fighting at Tali-Ihantala region. Finnish forces held to Tienhaara (now Seleznyovo) until the ceasefire in the end of summer 1944 but the village was left to the Soviet Union in the Treaty of Paris in 1947.
