= Pirkko Mannola =

Finnish actress (born 1938)

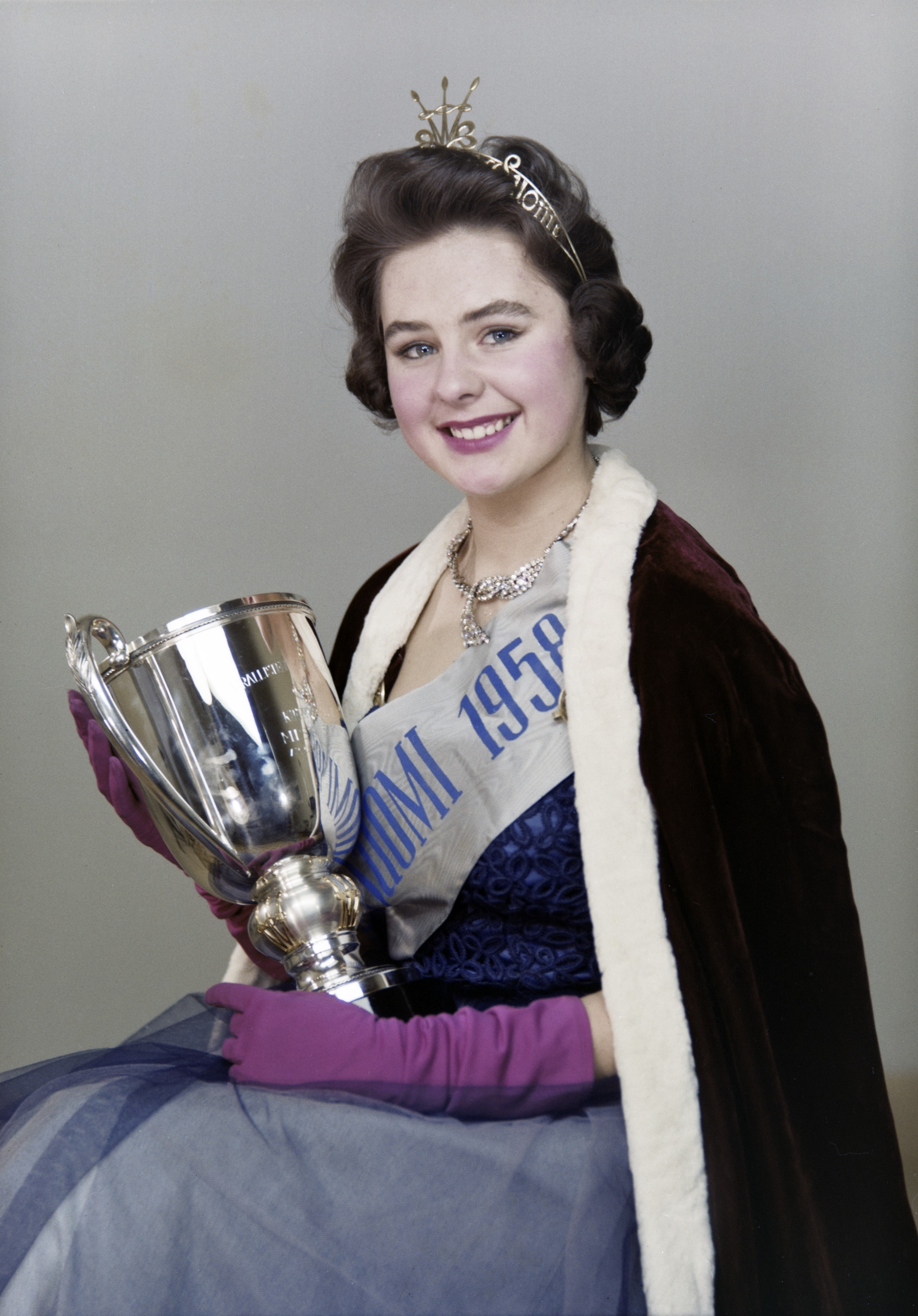
- Mannola in 1958
- Born: 27 December 1938 (age 87); Sääksmäki, Finland
- Occupations: Actress, singer
- Spouse(s): Åke Lindman (m. 1968; died 2009) Göran Stubb (engaged; 2016–present)
- Children: 1
- Beauty pageant titleholder
- Title: Miss Finland 1958
- Years active: 1959–present
- Major competitions: Miss Finland 1958 (Winner); Miss World 1958 (Did not compete)

Pirkko Mannola (born 27 December 1938) is a Finnish actress, singer, and beauty pageant titleholder who was crowned Miss Finland 1958. She did not compete in any other international pageants. She is also the stepmother of Alexander Stubb, the 13th President of Finland.

== Career ==
Mannola has appeared in more than 50 films and television shows since 1959. She starred in the film Kaks' tavallista Lahtista, which was entered into the 10th Berlin International Film Festival. In 1958 she won the Miss Finland beauty contest. In the early 1960s, Mannola had a successful career as a singer in Germany.

== Personal life ==
Mannola was married to film and TV director and actor Åke Lindman from 1968 until his death in 2009. They had one daughter. Since 2016, she has been engaged to the ice hockey executive Göran Stubb, the father of the 13th President of Finland, Alexander Stubb.

She is of partial Russian descent.

== Selected filmography ==
- Kaks' tavallista Lahtista (1960)
- Juokse kuin varas (1964)
- Leikkikalugangsteri (1969)

Awards and achievements
Preceded by Marita Lindahl	Miss Suomi; 1958	Succeeded by Tarja Nurmi
