= Åke Lindman =

Finnish footballer and actor (1928–2009)

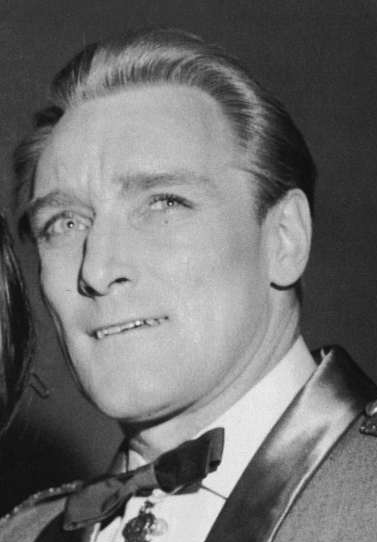
- Lindman in 1963
- Born: 11 January 1928; Helsinki, Finland
- Died: 3 March 2009 (aged 81); Espoo, Finland
Association football career
- Position: Defender
Youth career
- 1937-1945: HIFK
Senior career*
| Years | Team | Apps | (Gls) |
| 1946-1960 | Helsingfors IFK | | |
International career
| 1947-1955 | Finland | 25 | (0) |
| 1952 | Finland Olympic | 1 | (0) |
- * Club domestic league appearances and goals

Åke Leonard Lindman (born Åke Leonard Järvinen; 11 January 1928 – 3 March 2009) was a Finnish director and actor.

== Career ==
In his youth Lindman was a football player, playing as a defender for the Finland national team during the Olympics in Helsinki 1952. He represented the football club HIFK in the Finnish league where he played 81 games and scored 9 goals, he also played in second division for 8 seasons. In the 1960s, the British English Football League club Swindon Town F.C. wanted to sign him, but he turned them down to focus on his acting career.

Lindman began his movie career as an errand boy for Warner Bros. His first larger role as an actor was in Teuvo Tulio's Hornankoski, but his breakthrough as an actor came with his role as the stubborn soldier Lehto in the Edvin Laine film The Unknown Soldier in 1955 for which he received his first Jussi award. He was also the director or assistant director for several movies, starting with the 1957 film 1918 and continuing to the 2004 movie Beyond the Front Line and the 2007 movie Tali-Ihantala 1944. In addition to cinema, Lindman was active in television, both as an actor and a director of, amongst others, the television series Stormskärs Maja.

== Awards ==
Lindman received various awards during his career. These include the Finnish State Movie Award in 1968, the Pro Finlandia medal in 1982, the Finnish Ministry of Education and Culture's Suomi award in 1995 and the Swedish Order of the Polar Star 1st class in 2007. He also received three Jussi awards: the first for his role in The Unknown Soldier, the second for directing Den förtrollade vägen in 1988, and the last as recognition of his lifetime works.

== Personal life ==
Lindman was born in Helsinki and grew up in a working class Vallila neighbourhood. His father was a truck driver. His brother Tor, who also became a footballer, was born in 1930. In 1932, his father Väinö Järvinen died from pneumonia, and some years later his mother Edit remarried to Gösta Lindman. Lindman was already an adult when he was legally adopted and changed his surname to his step-father's.

Lindman was married to actress and singer Pirkko Mannola from 1968 until his death. They had one daughter.

Lindman was granted an honorary title of Professor in 2000, and received an honorary doctorate in political science from Åbo Akademi in 2005.

== Filmography (selection) ==
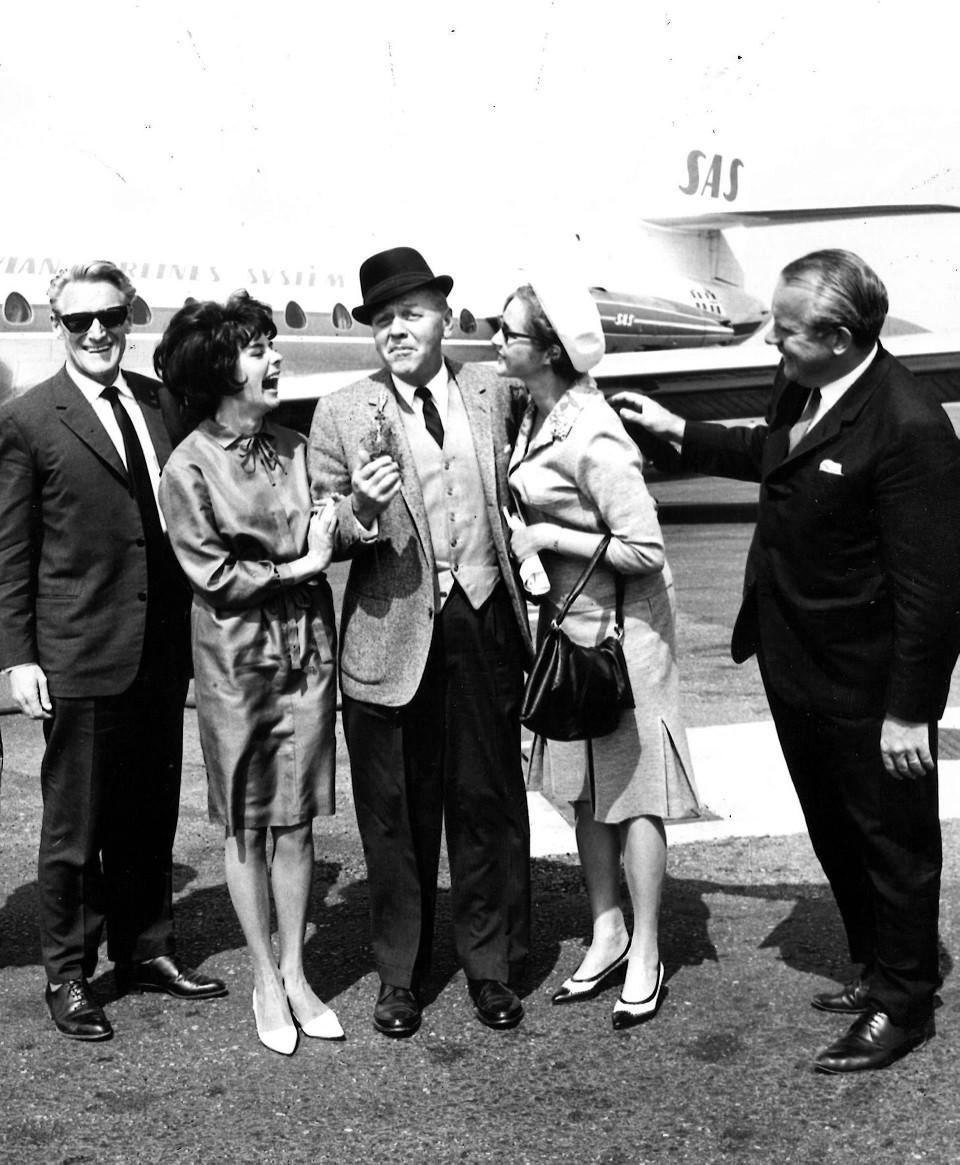
Åke Lindman (left) with Pirkko Mannola, Palmer Thompson, Mrs. Laihanen and Veikko Laihanen in 1964, when Thompson arrived in Finland to shoot Make Like a Thief.

=== Actor ===
- 1949: Hornankoski – Artturi Yli-Koskela
- 1950: Tanssi yli hautojen – Suomalainen upseeri
- 1950: Hallin Janne – Vallankumoukseen yllyttävä vanki Siperiassa
- 1952: Suomalaistyttöjä Tukholmassa – Erik
- 1952: The White Reindeer – forest ranger
- 1952: Yö on pitkä – Åke Strandberg
- 1953: Varsovan laulu – Captain
- 1953: Pekka Puupää – Petteri, the criminal (uncredited)
- 1953: We Come During Spring – Kymppi, lumberjack boss
- 1954: Kovanaama – Prisoner #2
- 1954: Niskavuoren Aarne – Steward
- 1954: Pekka ja Pätkä lumimiehen jäljillä – Riku Sundman
- 1955: Kiinni on ja pysyy – Arpi
- 1955: Kukonlaulusta kukonlauluun – Eino Kustaala
- 1955: Rakkaus kahleissa – Pertti Kuusi
- 1955: Viettelysten tie – Martti
- 1955: The Unknown Soldier – Lehto
- 1956: Silja – nuorena nukkunut – Valkoisten komppanianpäällikkö
- 1956: Olet mennyt minun vereeni – Erkki, captain
- 1957: Risti ja liekki – Inkvisiittori
- 1957: 1918 – Samuel Bro
- 1957: Herra Sotaministeri – German ambassador (uncredited)
- 1957: Vihdoinkin hääyö... – Teemu Järvinen
- 1957: No Tomorrow – Förrymd fånge
- 1958: The Lady in Black – David Frohm
- 1959: Ei ruumiita makuuhuoneeseen – Mike
- 1959: Moonwolf – Lumberjack
- 1959: Kohtalo tekee siirron – Mauri Petäjämaa
- 1960: Lumisten metsien tyttö – Jukka
- 1960: Isaskar Keturin ihmeelliset seikkailut – Anselmi Körmy
- 1961: Pojken i trädet – Sten Sundberg
- 1961: Kuu on vaarallinen – Nimismies
- 1961: Kertokaa se hänelle... – Ambulanceman
- 1961: Me – Urpo
- 1962: Älä nuolase... – Muuttomies (uncredited)
- 1962: Hän varasti elämän – Detective Oke Järvinen
- 1962: Naiset, jotka minulle annoit
- 1963: Villin Pohjolan kulta – Joel Vorna
- 1963: Teerenpeliä – Technical Manager (uncredited)
- 1963: Villin Pohjolan salattu laakso – Joel Vorna
- 1964: Make Like a Thief – Arvo Mäki
- 1965: Laukaus Kyproksessa – Vääpeli Onni Lintula
- 1967: Billion Dollar Brain – Minor Role (uncredited)
- 1968: The Shoes of the Fisherman – Soldier Releasing Lakota (uncredited)
- 1972: The Day the Clown Cried – Stout Prisoner
- 1977: Telefon – Lieutenant Alexandrov
- 1978: Tuntematon ystävä – Olavi Susikoski
- 1978: Bomsalva – Rurik Lindgren
- 1981: Reds – Scandinavian Escort
- 1982: Jousiampuja – Eino
- 1982: Klippet – Lagerförmannen
- 1982: The Archer
- 1983: Kalabaliken i Bender
- 1984: Dirty Story – Erik Järnstedt
- 1987: Lysande landning (TV Movie) – David Dreyer
- 1987: Lain ulkopuolella – Principal
- 1988: Kråsnålen (TV Mini-Series) – Ågren the Smith
- 1990: Ameriikan raitti – Otto
- 1991: Riktiga män bär alltid slips – Stålhane
- 1993: Harjunpää ja kiusantekijät – Emergency response center (voice, uncredited)
- 1995: Mannen utan ansikte – President (voice)
- 1996: The Hunters – The Boss
- 1996: Yöjuna – Kalevi Wallin
- 1999: En liten julsaga – Pekka
- 2003: Kohtalon kirja – Galagf (final film role)

=== Director ===
- 1964: Make Like a Thief (co-director with Richard Long and Palmer Thompson)
- 1999: Lapin kullan kimallus
- 2004: Framom främsta linjen
- 2007: Tali-Ihantala 1944
