= Jan-Christian Söderholm =

Finnish actor (born 1976)

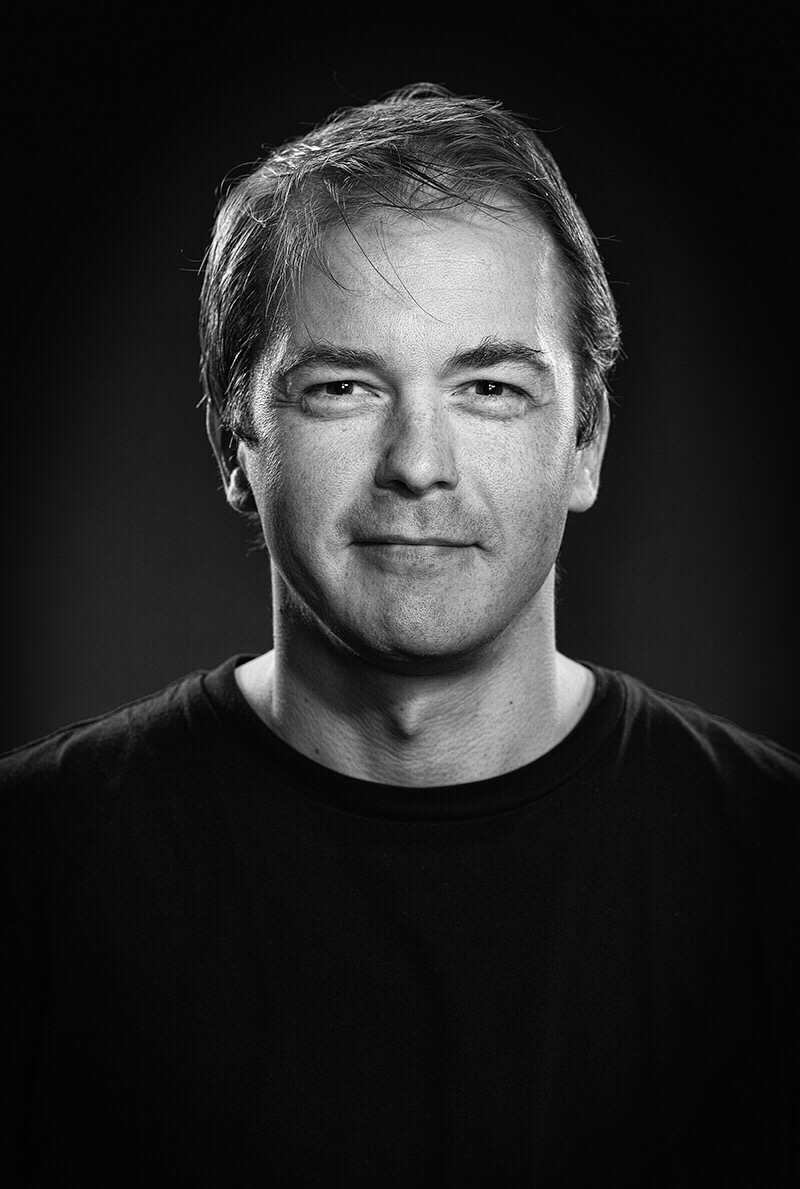
- Born: 7 December 1976 (age 48); Stockholm, Sweden

Jan-Christian Söderholm (born 7 December 1976 in Stockholm) is a Finnish actor. He graduated as Master of Arts in Theatre and Drama at the Theatre Academy of Finland in 2003. He has been working in several Finnish and Swedish speaking theatre and movie productions in Finland.

== Partial filmography ==
- Beyond the Front Line (Etulinjan edessä / Framom främsta linjen, 2004)
- The Mist (Sumu, 2007)
- Tali-Ihantala 1944 (2007)
