= Harry Järv =

Finnish and Swedish author, academic and war veteran (1921–2009)

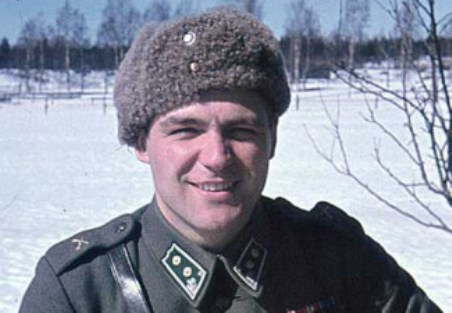
- Harry Järv during World War II
- Born: Harry Järv; 27 March 1921; Korsholm, Finland
- Died: 21 December 2009 (aged 88); Stockholm, Sweden
- Resting place: Korsholm old cemetery
- Occupations: librarian, author, translator

Harry Järv (27 March 1921 – 21 December 2009) was a Swedish-speaking Finnish and Swedish librarian, author and translator. He was a lieutenant-ranked veteran of World War II. By his political views, Järv was an anarcho-syndicalist.

== Early years and wartime ==
Järv was born in a farmer's family in the Western Finnish municipality of Korsholm. After graduating from high school in Vaasa, Järv went to sea at the age of 18. As the Winter War broke out in November 1939, he enlisted in the Finnish Army as a volunteer. Later in World War II, Järv was a platoon leader in the 61st Infantry Regiment that consisted almost exclusively of Swedish-speaking Finns. He was a member of a patrol unit, leading recon and combat patrols behind the enemy lines. In September 1943, Järv was seriously wounded by a landmine, and he spent the rest of the war at Saint Göran Hospital in Stockholm.

Järv carried a camera through the war and took plenty of pictures that were later published in his books. The 2004 Finnish war film Beyond the Front Line is based on Järv's diaries. In 1945, Järv helped his former superior, Alpo Marttinen, flee Finland to Sweden, although Järv said he didn't like Marttinen as a person. Colonel Marttinen, who later joined the United States Army, was involved with the Weapons Cache Case.

== Later years ==
After the war was over, Järv received a scholarship from Uppsala University and moved to Sweden, where he spent the rest of his life. Järv had a great interest in reading and collecting books since his childhood. Järv's library had more than 14,000 copies. He worked as a librarian and later as a deputy director at the National Library of Sweden.

In 1973, Järv was awarded an Honorary degree by Uppsala University. He was also a member of the Royal Swedish Academy of Letters, History and Antiquities. Järv wrote and translated more than 50 books as well as dozens of articles in various publications. His books were mostly essay collections of Ancient history, politics and philosophy. Järv was the editor-in-chief of Swedish culture magazines Horisont, Radix and Fenix and was known as an eminent expert on Franz Kafka.

== Political ideas ==
Järv was first introduced to anarchist ideas as a teenager through the books of Peter Kropotkin. During his time at sea, Järv was influenced by Finnish syndicalist Niilo Wälläri, who was the leader of the Finnish Seamen's Union. During the war, Järv adopted anarchist ideas in his role as a platoon leader. Järv treated his men equally to himself, and the decisions were made democratically. This often led to conflicts with his superior officers, and Järv was considered "unmilitary". In 1952, Järv joined the Swedish anarcho-syndicalist union SAC and started writing articles in its newspaper Arbetaren.

== Honours ==
- Order of the Cross of Liberty – 1939–1944
- Honorary degree of Philosophy, Uppsala University – 1973

== Awards ==
- Svenska Akademiens översättarpris – 1969
- Elsa Thulins översättarpris – 1976
- Lotten von Kræmers pris – 1986
- Längmanska kulturfondens pris – 2001
- Kellgrenpriset – 2007

== Books ==
- Nikolaj Leskov och det ryska samhället (1950)
- Kritik av den nya kritiken (1953)
- Klassisk horisont (1960)
- Introduktion till Kafka (1962)
- Vreden som brann hos peliden Achilleus (1962)
- Varaktigare än koppar (1962)
- Betydande böcker från vå regen tid (1966)
- Läsarmekanismer (1971)
- Frihet jämlikhet konstnärskap (1974)
- Ezra Pound, Litterära essäer (1975)
- Victor Svanberg (1976)
- Tycke och smak (1978)
- Konst och kvalitet (1979)
- Enfald eller mångfald (1982)
- Den svenska boken 500 år (1983)
- Vinghästen (1984)
- Trollkarl eller lärling, Atlantis (1986)
- Den "goda tvåans" paradoxala hemlighet (1991)
- Kunskapens träd (1991)
- Om judiska bidrag till svensk kultur (1992)
- Aktualiteter i historiskt perspektiv (1995)
- Prometheus' Eld (1998)
- Åsikter och avsikter (2002)
- Oavgjort i två krig (2006)
