= Elga Sesemann =

Finnish painter (1922–2007)

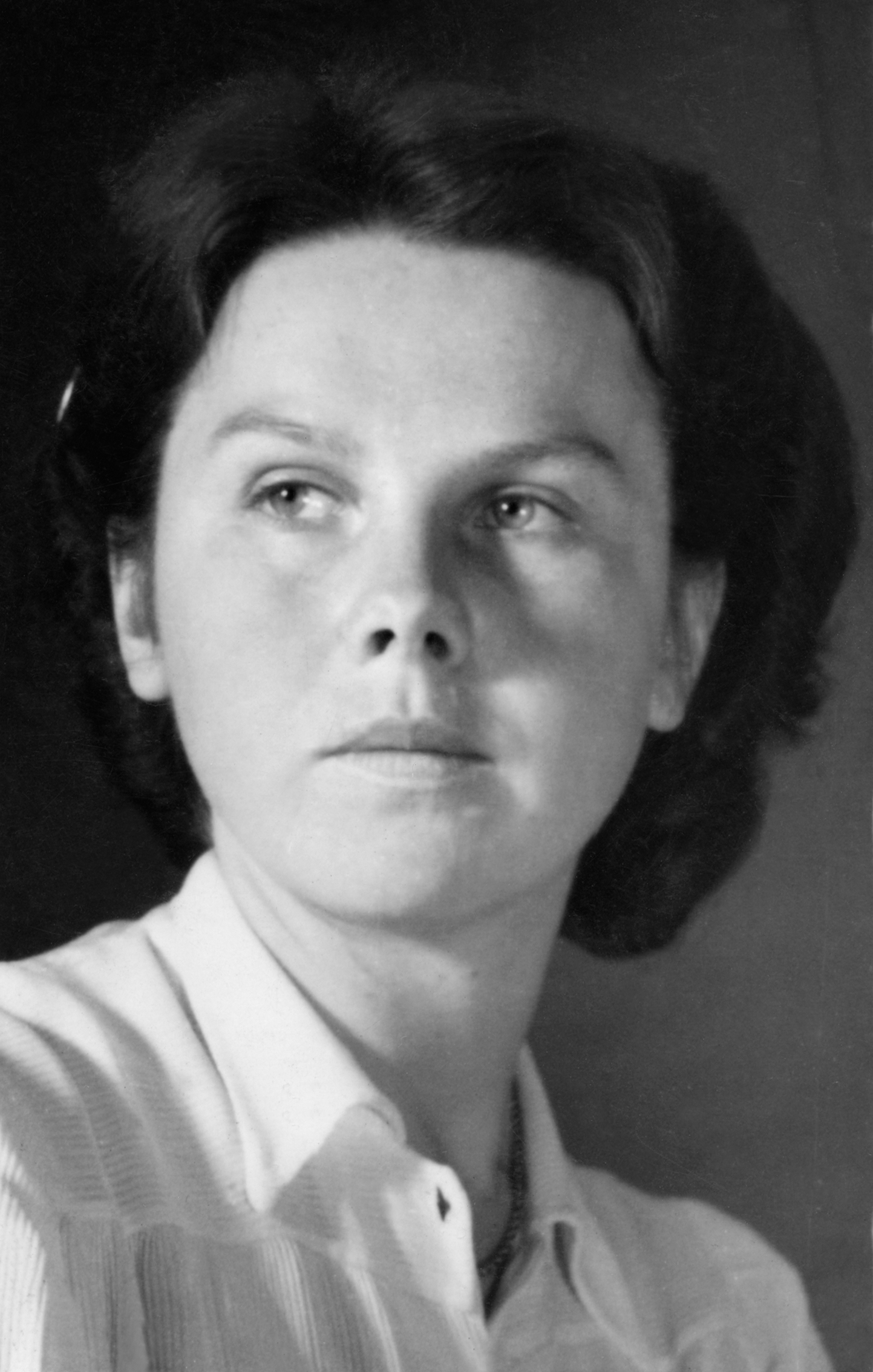
Elga Sesemann

Elga Sesemann (March 28, 1922 – January 21, 2007) was a Finnish post-war neo-romantic painter. She was an expressionist whose themes often included melancholy, depression, anxiety, and loneliness.

== Biography ==
Sesemann was born on March 28, 1922, in Viipuri (Vyborg) on the Karelian Isthmus. Sesemann's family is of German origin and she grew up speaking German and Russian. Additionally she learned Finnish in school. She grew up in Tienhaara, located about six kilometers by train from the urban centre of Viipuri where she went to school. Her father managed a linseed oil factory in Tienhaara. In 1939 Sesemann was evacuated to Helsinki. In 1941 she enrolled in the Finnish art academy and current art museum Ateneum. From 1943 to 1944 she enrolled in and studied at the Free Painting School. Sesemann had her first solo exhibition, including 52 works, on March 17, 1945, at Taidesalonki, 28 Unioninkatu, Helsinki. In July, 1945 Sesemann married fellow artist Seppo Näätänen. The couple lived in Ruovesi, from 1947 till Näätänen's death in 1964. She continued to live in Ruovesi thereafter but stayed in Helsinki during the winter months.

== Work ==
Sesemann is known for her personal, expressive and often melancholic style. She focused on the post war generation attitude through urban landscapes. The figures in most works are anonymous although many self portraits were made. Sesemann art focused on expressing feelings of pessimism and anxiety through mixes of reality and fantasy images; also including religious imagery. Sesemann was influenced by German expressionism, surrealism, and metaphysical art.

A self described non intellectual painter: Sesemann painted with swathes of paint, notably applied by palette knife however she did work with brushes as well. Sesemann used oil paints, pastels and gouache. Due to material shortages, attributed to the war, she and many other artist often had to work on cardboard or paper due to lack of canvas.

Sesemann participated in more than one hundred exhibition in her lifetime. Her works have been exhibited more than twenty times after her death, mostly in Finland but also in Stockholm, Tallinn, Copenhagen, Beijing, Tokyo and New York. Sesemann is represented in many museums, The Finnish National Gallery, Ateneum, in Helsinki, have a collection of 61 works (as of 2025) .
