= Söderblom =

Söderblom or Soderblom is a Swedish surname, and may refer to:

- 2864 Soderblom, an asteroid named after American planetary geologist Laurence A. Soderblom
- Åke Söderblom (1910–1965), Swedish actor, screenwriter and songwriter
- Arvid Söderblom (born 1999), Swedish ice hockey goaltender
- Elmer Söderblom (born 2001), Swedish ice hockey player
- Lena Söderblom (born 1935), Swedish actress
- Nathan Söderblom (1866–1931), Swedish clergyman, Archbishop of Uppsala in the Church of Sweden, and recipient of the 1930 Nobel Peace Prize
- Nicklas Söderblom, personal trainer, actor, and author
- Staffan Söderblom (1900–1985), Swedish diplomat
- Anders Søderblom (born 1963), Danish curler

== See also ==
- Södergren
