= Söderholm =

Söderholm or Soderholm may refer to the following individuals:

- Eric Soderholm (born 1948), former Major League Baseball third baseman
- Glen Soderholm, Canadian Contemporary Christian, singer-songwriter and minister in Rockwood, Ontario, Canada
- Jan-Christian Söderholm (born 1976), Finnish actor
- Jeanette Söderholm, Swedish singer of Jamaican origin
- Stefan Söderholm (born 1979), Swedish Bandy player who currently plays for Sandvikens AIK as a midfielder
- Toni Söderholm (born 1978), Finnish professional ice hockey defenceman, currently playing for HIFK in the SM-liiga
