= Göran Stubb =

Finnish ice hockey executive (born 1935)

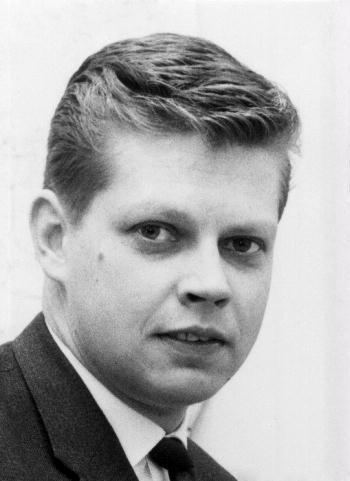
- Stubb in the 1960s
- Born: 10 March 1935 (age 91)
- Known for: Chairman of IFK Helsinki; Director of NHL's European Scouting
- Spouse: Christel Setälä (died 2008)
- Partner: Pirkko Mannola (2016–present)
- Children: Alexander Stubb

Göran Stubb (Note: Swedish pronunciation: [jøːran stɵbː]) (born 10 March 1935) is a Finnish ice hockey executive. He is the National Hockey League (NHL) Director of European Scouting. Stubb began working as the chairman of IFK Helsinki from 1961 to 1975 before joining the Finnish Ice Hockey Association in 1976 as their Managing Director. After serving as the Secretary General for the 1982 Ice Hockey World Championships, Stubb began European Sports Service, a European scouting service, in 1983 following urging from Jim Gregory, then Director of NHL Central Scouting. This became the first major European scouting association with the NHL.

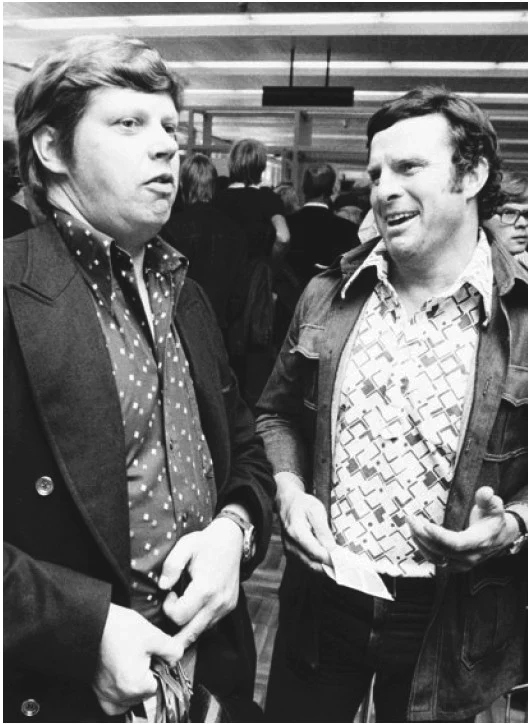
Stubb (left) with Carl Brewer

In 2000, Stubb was inducted into the builder category of the IIHF Hall of Fame.

== Personal life ==
Stubb is the father of politician Alexander Stubb, the 13th president of Finland, from his first marriage to Christel née Setälä (1943–2008). Since 2016, he has been engaged to the singer, actress and former Miss Finland, Pirkko Mannola.
