= Make Like a Thief =

- Film poster
- Finnish: Juokse kuin varas
- Directed by: Åke Lindman; Palmer Thompson; Richard Long (uncredited)
- Written by: Palmer Thompson
- Produced by: Veikko Laihanen
- Starring: Richard Long; Åke Lindman; Pirkko Mannola
- Cinematography: Kalle Peronkoski; Reijo Hassinen
- Edited by: Kari Uusitalo; Åke Lindman
- Music by: Erkki Melakoski
- Production companies: V-P Productions A. G. Veikko Laihanen Oy
- Distributed by: Emerson Film Enterprises (US release)
- Release date: November 20, 1964
- Running time: 88 minutes
- Countries: Finland; United States
- Language: English
- Budget: FIM 480,000

Make Like a Thief (Finnish: Juokse kuin varas) is a 1964 Finnish-American crime film directed by Åke Lindman and Palmer Thompson. It stars Richard Long.

== Production ==
The film was a Finnish-US co-production. Long said he made the film because it was a job, and it gave him the chance to direct and see Finland.

It was filmed during a strike by Finnish filmmakers; the producers received a special dispensation to make the movie.
