= Alpo K. Marttinen =

Finnish and American army officer

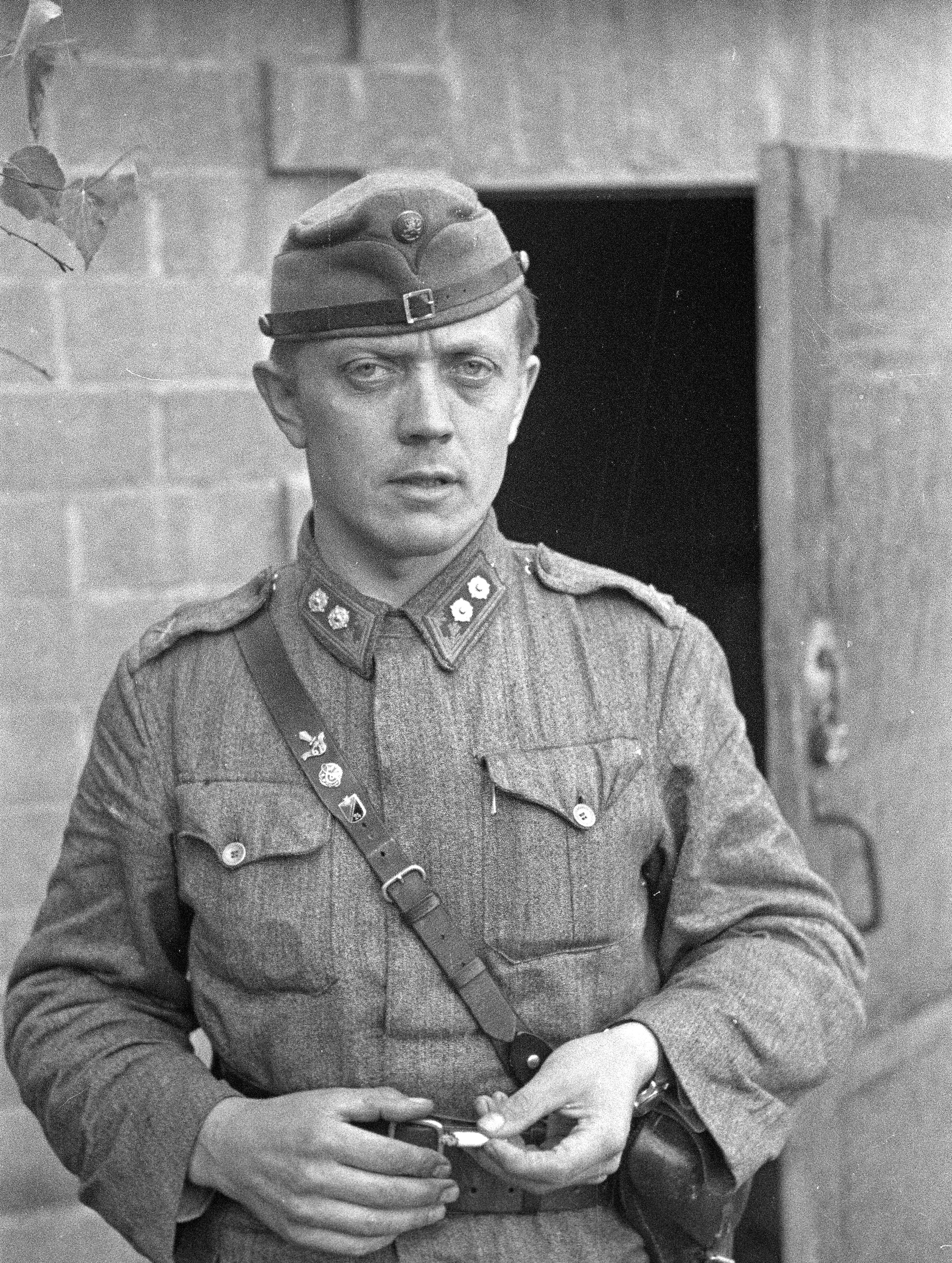
- Alpo Marttinen during World War II, in 1944
- Born: Alpo Kullervo Marttinen; 4 November 1908; Alatornio, Finland
- Died: 20 December 1975 (aged 67); Falls Church, Virginia, United States
- Burial place: Fort Leavenworth National Cemetery
- Military career
- Allegiance: Finland; United States
- Branch: Finnish Army; United States Army
- Rank: Colonel
- Commands: 61st Infantry Regiment (Finland)
- Conflicts: World War II; Winter War; Continuation War; Lapland War

Alpo Kullervo Marttinen (4 November 1908 – 20 December 1975) was a Finnish and American colonel. During World War II he served in the Finnish Army. Following the war he immigrated to the United States and served as an officer in the United States Army, retiring as a colonel.

== Finland ==
Marttinen was born and raised in Alatornio in northern Finland. His father was Albin Marttinen, a train conductor. Two of Marttinen's older brothers had chosen a military life. The oldest brother, Einar Marttinen, earned a theological degree but joined the Jäger Movement, fought in the Finnish Civil War and was killed in action in 1919 as a lieutenant in the Estonian War of Independence. His other brother, Sulo Marttinen, made a career of the army and fell as a captain during the Continuation War. A third brother, Olli Marttinen, became parson of Alatornio. Marttinen graduated from the high school in Tornio in 1927 and entered the army as an officer cadet. He was promoted to captain in 1938 and became a general staff officer in 1939. As a successful officer during the wars, he had a rapid career; major 1940, lieutenant colonel 1941 and colonel 1944. During the Winter War, he served as chief of staff of the 9th division and fought at the battles of Suomussalmi, Raate and Kuhmo. During the Continuation War Marttinen served as a staff officer, commanding officer of 61st Infantry Regiment and chief of staff of the 3rd Army Corps. He participated in the battles of Korpiselkä, Kuujärvi, Svir bridgehead and Tienhaara, and was wounded in action 1943 at Svir.

== United States ==
Marttinen was one of the key figures in the Weapons Cache Case where a large number of Finnish Army weapons were hidden around the country in case of a Soviet invasion. Soldiers involved in this case were forced to leave Finland since hiding weapons was a criminal act due to the 1944 Moscow Armistice. These soldiers, most of whom fled to United States and enlisted in the U.S. Army, were later called "Marttinen's men".

Marttinen first fled to Sweden in 1945 with the help of his former subordinate officer Harry Järv. A year later Marttinen and his family moved to the United States, where he was given citizenship in 1951. He served in the US Army from 1947 to 1968, first as a specialist and instructor of winter warfare and later as a General Staff Officer in the United States, West Germany, and South Korea. Marttinen spent the last three years of his career as a military advisor in Iran. He also was a graduate of the US Army Command and General Staff College (1950) and the US Army War College (1963).

Marttinen died on 20 December 1975, at Falls Church, Virginia, and was buried at Fort Leavenworth National Cemetery. He had three sons. His oldest, Pekka Marttinen (1933–1958), served as a lieutenant in the 2nd U.S. Cavalry Regiment and was killed in a gunnery explosion in Grafenwöhr, Germany.

== Awards and decorations ==
Finland

Mannerheim Cross 2nd Class	Cross of Liberty 2nd Class, with Sword and Oak Leave	Cross of Liberty 2nd Class, with Sword	Cross of Liberty 3rd Class, with Sword	Memorial Medal of the Winter War	Memorial Medal of the Continuation War

Germany

Iron Cross 2nd Class

United States

Legion of Merit	Army Commendation Medal	Army Good Conduct Medal	National Defense Service Medal
