= Tali-Ihantala 1944 =

2007 Finnish war film

- A film poster
- Directed by: Åke Lindman, Sakari Kirjavainen
- Written by: Stefan Forss, Benedict Zilliacus, Esko Salervo
- Produced by: Alf Hemming
- Starring: Marcus Groth, Onni Thulesius, Asko Sarkola
- Distributed by: Buena Vista International
- Release date: 7 December 2007
- Country: Finland
- Languages: Finnish; Swedish
- Budget: €3,200,000

Tali-Ihantala 1944 (English title 1944: The Final Defence) is a 2007 Finnish war film directed by Åke Lindman and Sakari Kirjavainen, based on the Battle of Tali–Ihantala during the Continuation War. Filming began during the summer of 2006 and was screened in autumn 2007. Lindman wanted the film to be as real as possible, and only include facts. He also wanted Finns to remember the sacrifices the soldiers made in those battles.

The film received 350,000 euros in production support from the Finnish Film Foundation. The organization created to raise money for the movie was led by Admiral Jan Klenberg and former Finnish President Mauno Koivisto was the patron of the project.

The movie was made using a wide array of genuine wartime vehicles and, when it was not possible to acquire originals, replicas were used. Some of the tanks used had participated in the actual real-life battles depicted in the film and had been stored in a museum. Also used was a Focke-Wulf Fw 190 replica made by the German company Flug + Werk. During the shooting of the movie, the aircraft was decorated with markings similar to that of Major Erich Rudorffer's aircraft in 1944.

The reception for the film was mixed. Most of the criticism was targeted at the lack of main characters and a proper plot.
