= Lahti Art Museum =

Art museum in Lahti, Finland

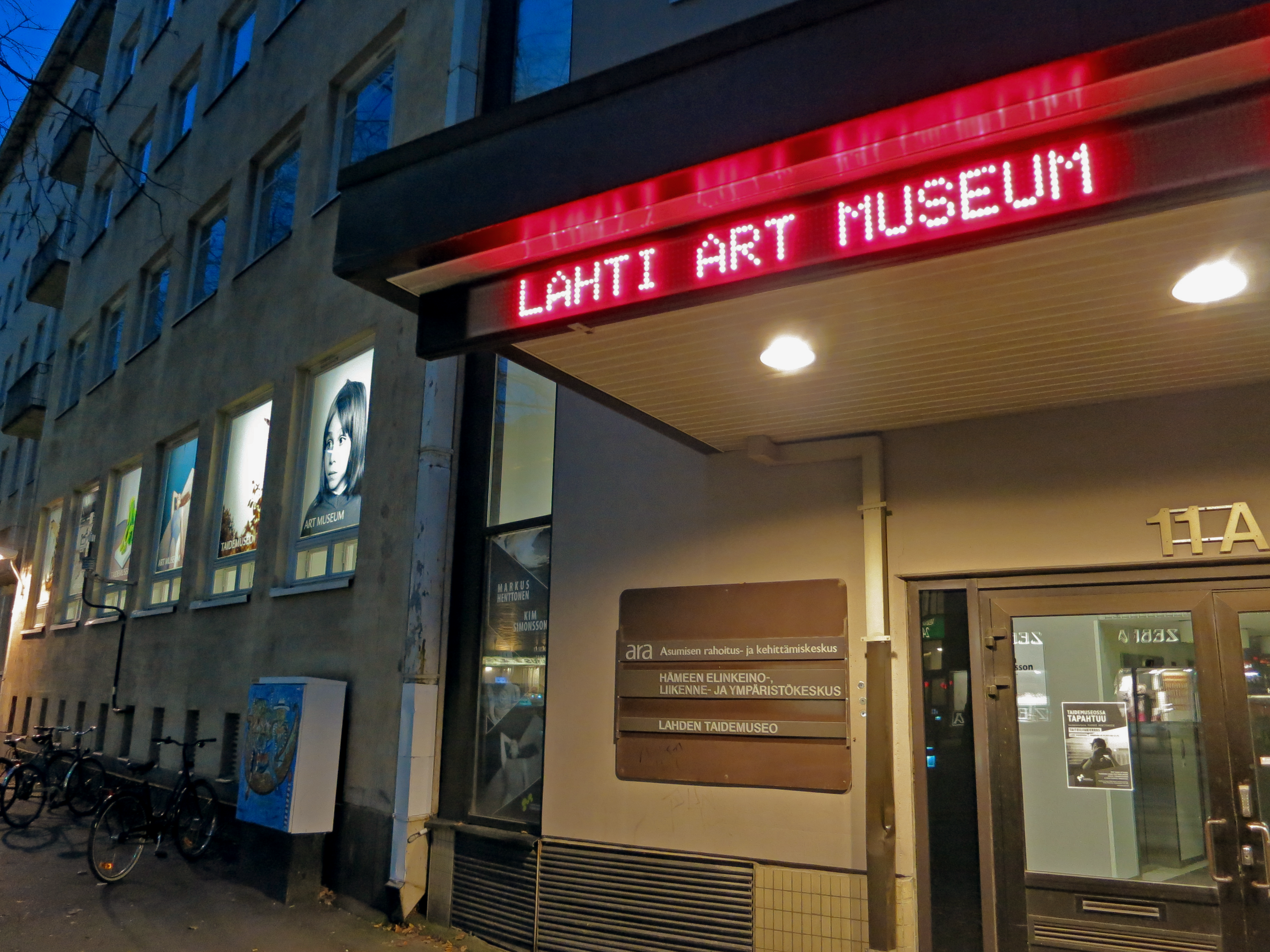
- Established: 1950
- Location: Päijät-Häme, Finland
- Coordinates: 60.984329°N 25.662361°E
- Type: Art museum
- Director: Hannu Takala
- Curators: Susanna Korhonen, Paula Korte, Liisa Mäkitalo
- Website: Lahti Art Museum

The Lahti Art Museum is a museum focusing on visual arts, located in Lahti, Finland. The museum was founded in 1950. In connection with it is also the Poster Museum, established in 1975.

Lahti Art Museum is currently closed from visitors (as of mid-2020). It will reopen in new premises in 2021, under the name Lahti Art, Poster and Design Museum LAD. Previously, the art museum was located in a ground floor of an office building located Vesijärvenkatu 11.

== Regional art museum ==
The Lahti Art Museum also operated as a regional art museum of the Päijät-Häme from 1980. The task of a regional art museum is to give guidance and offer professional help to local municipalities in questions of visual art. A regional art museum also develops accessibility of services and aids collaboration between organizations.
