= Elovena =

Finnish food brand

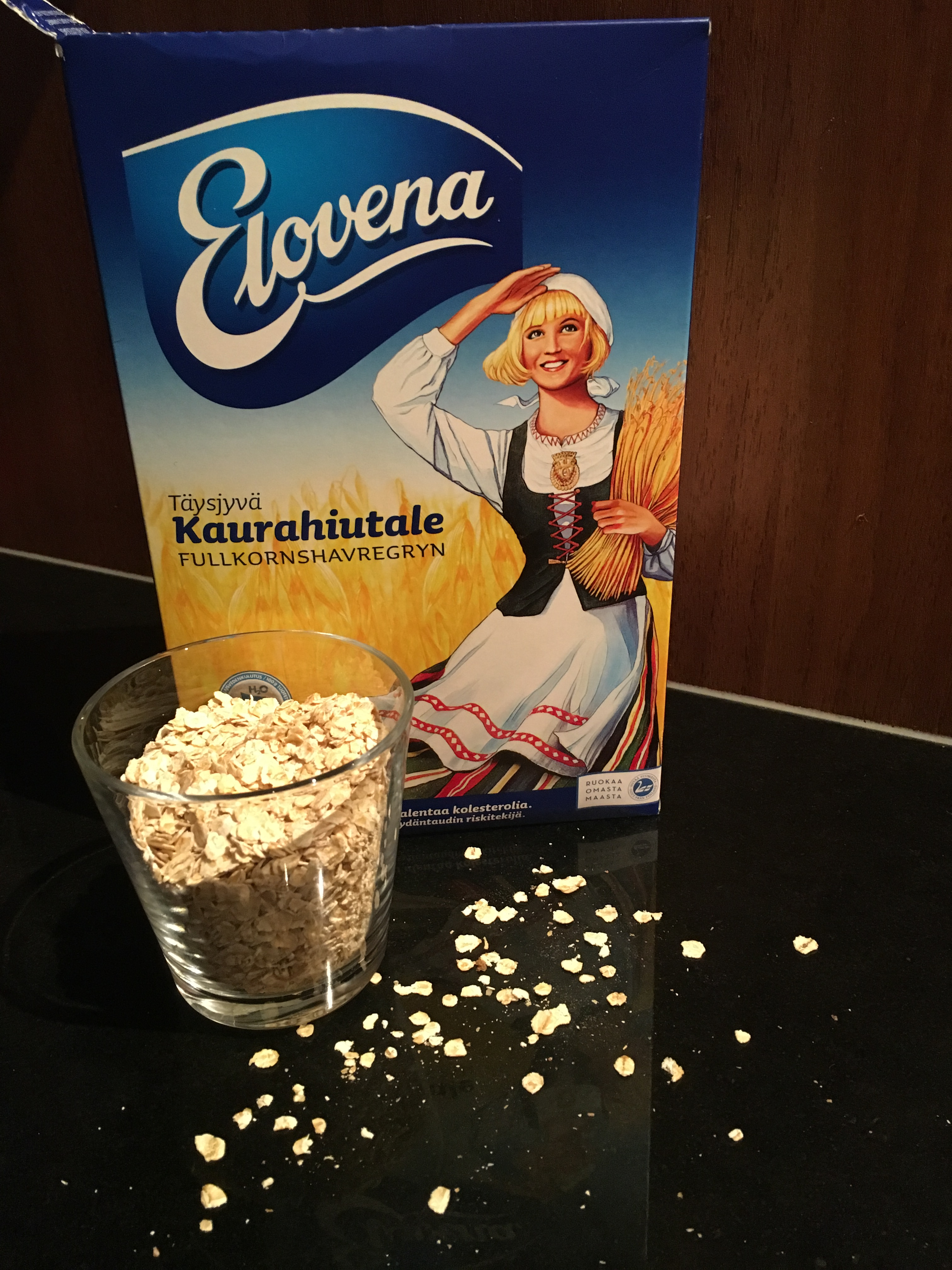
A packet of Elovena oat flakes, from 2016 when the sickle on the packaging had already been removed.

Elovena is a Finnish food brand by the Raisio Group. The Elovena product line includes oat flakes and other cereal products. In 2020 the product line included prepackaged porridges, flakes, bran and germ, vegetable protein products, snack drinks and cookies as well as breakfast cereal. There are over 60 products in total.

The brand is known from the romantic nationalist image on the packaging, the so-called Elovena girl. The image features a blonde-haired, young woman in a traditional Finnish dress and scarf standing on a grain field holding a bunch of oats.

== History ==
Elovena was born in Vyborg, at the company Karjalan mylly OY in 1925. The name of the brand came from the company's previous name Myllyosakeyhtiö Elo and the binomial name of oat, Avena sativa. The original artist of the Elovena girl standing on a grain field was Joel Räsänen (1905–1978) from Tienhaara in Vyborg, who was the son of a mill machinery operator. His drawing won an advertisement contest organised by Karjalan mylly, which was held to select an image for a package containing "extra premium" steamed Elovena oat flakes.

Production of Elovena was originally started by the architect and businessman Edoard Mielck from Vyborg, but his partners stole the idea from him and started to produce it in their mill.

The oat in Elovena products comes from the Raisio Group's companion farmers at a radius of about a hundred kilometres from the Nokia mill. Elovena flakes have been produced in Nokia since 1990, when Melia was founded.

Elovena Puurobaari was founded in summer 2014. The idea of the marketing campaign was to uphold the porridge culture by renovating the traditional porridge and by utilising current trends by serving it from a food truck.

The Raisio Group has been closely guarding the Elovena brand. In 2006, a Hufvudstadsbladet advertising campaign featuring black woman posing on a field in a Finnish national dress was cancelled on the Raisio Group's request. The artist Jani Leinonen parodied the Elovena girl in present-day Finland. The Raisio Group wrote a letter to Leinonen.

Elovena Muru Kaurajauhis is a ready-cooked vegetable protein product produced by the Raisio Group, made from Elovena full grain oats grown on Finnish fields, oat bran, water, salt and potato and pea protein.

== Marketing and advertising ==
Elovena won the Porridge of the year 2011 award at the Lahti Harvest Festival in October 2011.

According to Taloustutkimus, Elovena has been one of the most popular food brands in Finland. Elovena was also one of the three most responsible brands according to the Sustainable Brand Index survey conducted of Finnish consumers.

In 2013 Elovena received the annual Brand Setter of the Year from the Finnish Advertising Union. Every year, the Brand Setter of the Year award is given to a member company of the Finnish Advertising Union, which has been exemplary in its marketing. According to the Finnish Advertising Union, Elovena is a brand that depicts Finnishness in a traditional way. Finns most prominently associate the Elovena brand with images of health, trustworthiness and naturalness. According to the panel, familiar, easily recognisable elements of the Elovena brand include the logo as well as colours and themes appearing in the marketing and packaging, such as the Elovena girl and bundles of oats. The appearance has been upgraded throughout the years.

In a renovation in 2017, the grain field was removed from the background of the Elovena girl. The sickle in the girl's hand had already been removed. Different outfits were tested in 2017, but three quarters of Finns thought the national costume was the only right outfit for the Elovena girl. The entire brand underwent a renovation in 2020, when the traditional Finnish costume was removed. This renovation was done by the brand agency Bond Agency. The reason for the renovation was better compliance to international use. The Raisio Group attempted to improve their international sales of oats.
