= Keskipohjanmaa =

Keskipohjanmaa is a morning broadsheet newspaper published in Kokkola, Finland.

== History and profile ==
Keskipohjanmaa was first published on 5 December 1917. Its headquarters is in Kokkola. The paper has also regional offices in Haapajärvi, Kalajoki, Jakobstad, Veteli and Ylivieska.

Keskipohjanmaa was the organ of the Centre Party until 1996 when it declared its independence.

The circulation of Keskipohjanmaa was 27,907 copies in 2006.
