= List of Finnish films of the 1990s =

A list of films produced in Finland ordered by year of release. For an alphabetical list of Finnish films see Category:Finnish films

Title	Director	Cast	Genre	Notes
1990
Amazon	Mika Kaurismäki	Kari Väänänen, Robert Davi, Rae Dawn Chong	Drama	
Friends, Comrades	Rauni Mollberg	Mikk Mikiver, Stina Ekblad, Hannu Lauri	Drama	Screened at the 1991 Cannes Film Festival
I Hired a Contract Killer	Aki Kaurismäki	Jean-Pierre Léaud, Margi Clarke, Kenneth Colley	Drama	
Tulitikkutehtaan tyttö	Aki Kaurismäki	Kati Outinen, Elina Salo, Esko Nikkari	Comedy, drama	
1991
Daddy and the Muscle Academy	Ilppo Pohjola		Documentary	
Mysterion	Pirjo Honkasalo, Eira Mollberg		Documentary	
Pirtua, pirtua	Visa Mäkinen	Martti Kainulainen, Matti Mäntylä, Ahti Kuoppala	Drama	
Rolli: Amazing Tales	Olli Soinio	Allu Tuppurainen, Sari Mällinen, Jussi Lampi	Fantasy	
Zombie and the Ghost Train	Mika Kaurismäki	Silu Seppälä, Marjo Leinonen, Matti Pellonpää	Comedy, drama	
1992
Back to the USSR (takaisin Ryssiin)	Jari Halonen	Jorma Tommila, Taisto Reimaluoto	Comedy	
Shear Fear	Ilari Nummi	Tiina Tenhunen, Katja Krohn, Tarja-Tuulikki Tarsala	Drama	
La Vie de Bohème	Aki Kaurismäki	Matti Pellonpää, Evelyne Didi, Andre Wilms	Comedy drama	Co-produced with France
Uuno Turhapuro - Suomen tasavallan herra presidentti	Ere Kokkonen	Vesa-Matti Loiri	Comedy	
Veturimiehet heiluttaa	Kari Paljakka	Samuli Edelmann, Santeri Kinnunen	Drama	
1993
Darkness in Tallinn	Ilkka Järvi-Laturi	Ivo Uukkivi, Elina Aasa, Milena Gulbe	Comedy thriller	1 win; Estonian-Finnish-USA co-production
The Land of Happiness	Markku Pölönen	Katariina Kaitue, Pertti Koivula, Anja Pohjola	Comedy, drama	
The Last Border	Mika Kaurismäki	Jolyon Baker, Jürgen Prochnow, Fanny Bastien, Kari Väänänen	Post-apocalyptic science fiction	Finnish-German-Swedish-French co production
Pater Noster	Veikko Aaltonen	Hannu Kivioja, Martti Katajisto	Drama	
Pekko aikamiespoika				
Ripa Hits the Skids	Christian Lindblad	Sam Huber, Mari Vainio, Merja Larivaara	Comedy	Entered into the 18th Moscow International Film Festival
1994
Aapo	Tero Jartti	Taisto Reimaluoto	Drama	
Leningrad Cowboys Meet Moses	Aki Kaurismäki	Matti Pellonpää, Kari Väänänen, André Wilms	Comedy	
Pekko ja poika				
Take Care of Your Scarf, Tatiana	Aki Kaurismäki	Kati Outinen, Matti Pellonpää, Kirsi Tykkyläinen	Comedy, drama	
Total Balalaika Show	Aki Kaurismäki	Leningrad Cowboys, Alexandrov Red Army Ensemble	Music documentary	
1995
Absolute Guitar	Markus Viljanen		Music docu	TV film
Condition Red	Mika Kaurismäki	James Russo, Cynda Williams, Paul Calderon	Thriller	Entered into the 19th Moscow International Film Festival
Kummeli Stories	Matti Grönberg	Heikki Hela	Comedy	Based on TV series Kummeli (1991–2004)
The Last Wedding	Markku Pölönen	Martti Suosalo, Henrika Andersson, Matti Varjo	Comedy	
Lipton Cockton in the Shadows of Sodoma	Jari Halonen	Jorma Tommila	Scifi	
Pekko ja massahurmaaja				
1996
Aatamin poika	Heikki Veijola	Meri Nenonen	Short drama	
The Christmas Party	Jari Halonen	Jorma Tommila, Antti Reini	Crime comedy	
Merisairas	Veikko Aaltonen	Bob Peck, Katrin Cartlidge, Peter Firth	Thriller	International co-production
Pekko ja muukalainen				
Santa Claus and the Magic Drum	Mauri Kunnas, Pekka Lehtosaari	Esa Saario, Ulla Tapaninen, Henna Haverinen	Animation	
Kauas pilvet karkaavat	Aki Kaurismäki	Kati Outinen, Kari Väänänen, Elina Salo	Comedy, drama	Entered into the 1996 Cannes Film Festival
1997
Atman	Pirjo Honkasalo		Documentary	
The Collector	Auli Mantila	Leea Klemola, Elina Hurme, Rea Mauranen	Drama	
Freakin' Beautiful World	Jarmo Lampela		Drama	
Kummeli: Kultakuume	Matti Grönberg	Heikki Hela	Comedy	2 nominations; 2nd Kummeli film
Pekko ja unissakävelijä				
Vaiennut kylä				
The Minister of State	Paul-Anders Simma	Anna Maria Blind, Mikkel Gaup, Peo Grape	Comedy	Entered into the 20th Moscow International Film Festival
1998
Fire-Eater	Pirjo Honkasalo	Elina Hurme, Tiina Weckström, Elena Leeve	Drama	
Going to Kansas City	Pekka Mandart	Mikko Nousiainen, Melissa Galianos, Michael Ironside	Drama	Canadian-Finnish co-production
L.A. Without a Map	Mika Kaurismäki	David Tennant, Vinessa Shaw, Julie Delpy	Comedy	International co-production
A Summer by the River	Markku Pölönen	Pertti Koivula, Simo Kontio, Esko Nikkari	Comedy, drama	
Tommy and the Wildcat	Raimo O. Niemi, Ville Suhonen	Konsta Hietanen, Risto Tuorila, Jarmo Mäkinen	Adventure	Entered into the Chicago International Children's Film Festival
Trains'n'Roses	Peter Lichtefeld	Joachim Król, Peter Lohmeyer, Outi Mäenpää	Comedy	German-Finnish co-production
1999
In Bed with Santa	Kjell Sundvall	Katarina Ewerlöf, Peter Haber, Jessica Zandén	Comedy	Swedish-Finnish co-production
An Eye for an Eye	Atro Lahtela	Meri Nenonen, Jani Volanen, Jukka-Pekka Palo	Horror	
Lapin kullan kimallus (Gold Fever in Lapland)	Åke Lindman	Vesa Vierikko, Pirkka-Pekka Petelius	Drama	1 nomination
A Long Hot Summer	Perttu Leppä	Unto Helo, Hanna-Mari Karhinen, Mikko Hakola	Comedy	
Juha	Aki Kaurismäki	Sakari Kuosmanen, Kati Outinen, André Wilms	Comedy, drama	
Rukajärven tie (Ambush)	Olli Saarela	Peter Franzén, Irina Björklund	War drama	11 wins & 5 nominations, entered into Moscow
Spy Games	Ilkka Järvi-Laturi	Bill Pullman, Irène Jacob, Bruno Kirby	Action	
The Swan and the Wanderer	Timo Koivusalo	Tapio Liinoja, Martti Suosalo, Heikki Nousiainen	Drama	
The Tough Ones	Aleksi Mäkelä	Samuli Edelmann, Juha Veijonen, Teemu Lehtilä	Drama	
