= Merja Larivaara =

Finnish actress (born 1964)

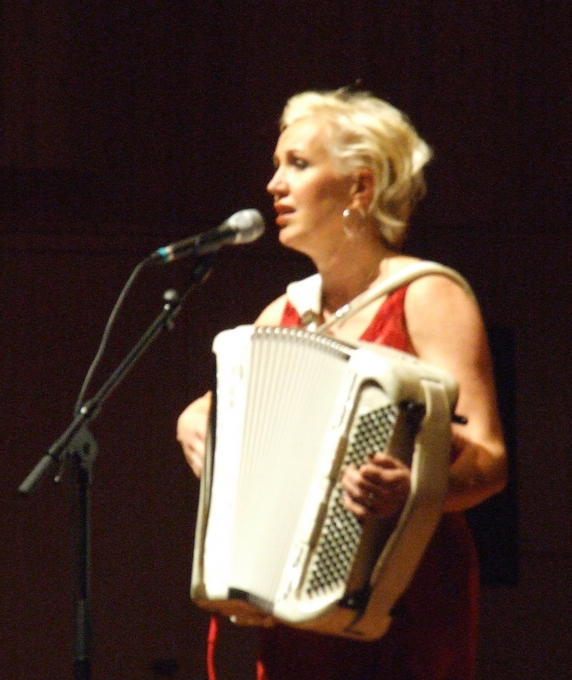
- Merja Larivaara
- Born: 4 July 1964 (age 61); Haukipudas, Finland

Merja Larivaara (born 4 July 1964 in Haukipudas, Finland) is a Finnish actress.

Larivaara began her career in 1988 in Rengasmatka and has thirty or so appearances on film and television, often appearing on shows as herself.

She starred in the 1994 film Aapo with actors such as Taisto Reimaluoto, Ulla Koivuranta, Kai Lehtinen, Martti Suosalo and Esko Nikkari.

In 2005, she appeared in TV series Game Over.

== Selected filmography ==
- The Well (1992)
- Ripa Hits the Skids (1993)
- The Path of the Righteous Men (2012)
