= Hannu Kivioja =

Finnish actor

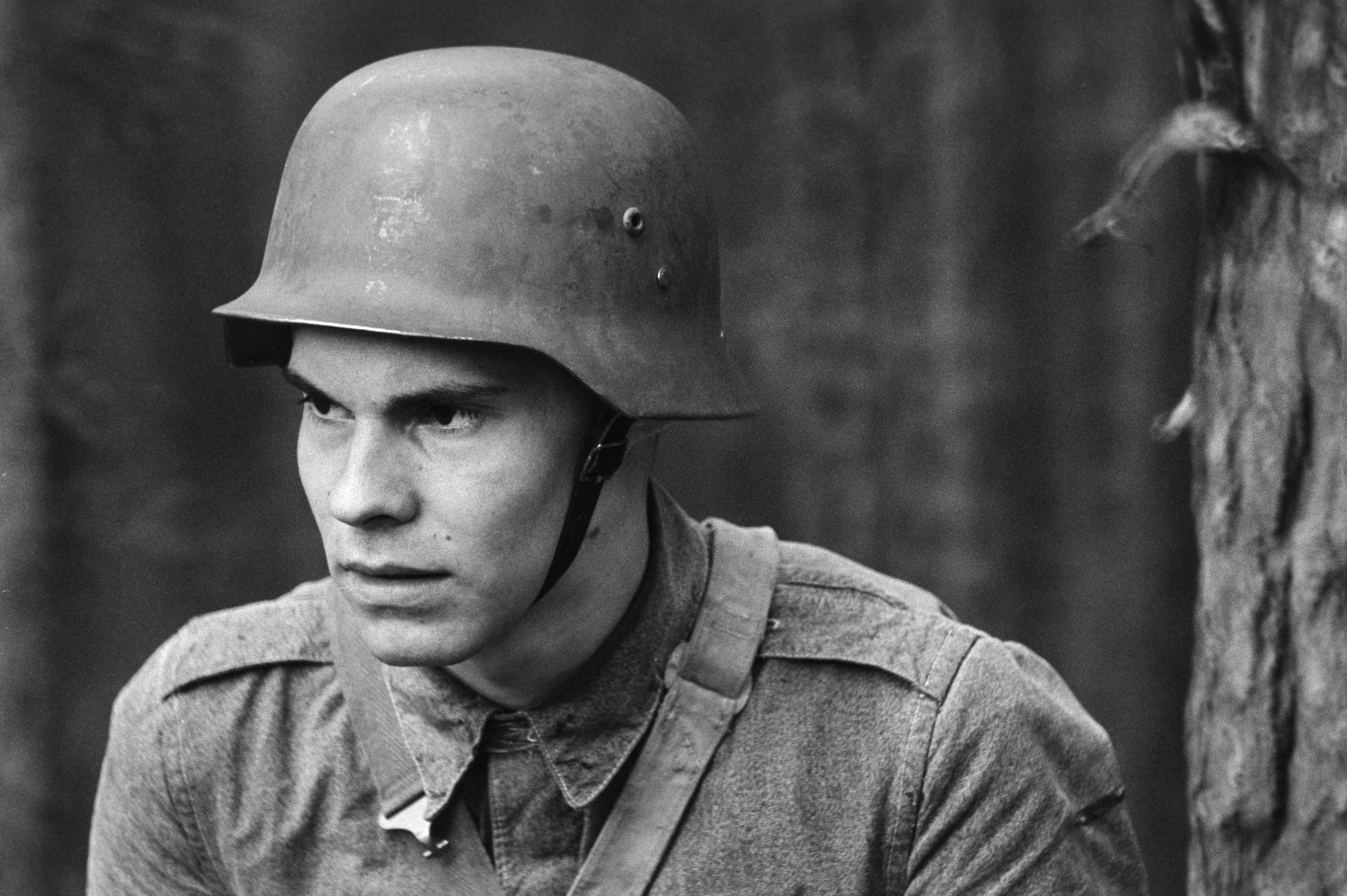
Kivioja in 1984, during the principal cinematography of the film The Unknown Soldier in Niinisalo.

Hannu Kivioja (born 30 June 1963) is a Finnish actor.

Kivioja was born in Ylivieska. Originally he tried for the Helsinki Theatre Academy for the first time in 1985, but did not get in at that time. He was discovered by Rauni Mollberg, who gave him the role of Riitaoja in The Unknown Soldier, which was his debut. Thanks to his role, he got into Theater Academy the following year.

Kivioja has also acted in, among others, Aleksi Mäkelä's Bad Boys, as well as Timo Koivusalo's Sibelius and The Rose of the Rascal. His the most significant role Juhani Haavisto in 1993 film Pater Noster, directed by Veikko Aaltonen, for which Kivioja won the Jussi Award for Best Actor.

== Partial filmography ==
- The Unknown Soldier (1985)
- Friends, Comrades (1990)
- Shear Fear (1992)
- Pater Noster (1993)
- The Swan and the Wanderer (1999)
- Spy Games (1999)
- The Rose of the Rascal (2001)
- Bad Boys (2003)
- Sibelius (2003)
- Shadow of the Eagle (2005)
- V2: Dead Angel (2007)
- The Border (2007)
- Last Cowboy Standing (2009)
- Sixpack (2011)
- The Other Side of Hope (2017)
