= Esko Nikkari =

Finnish actor (1938–2006)

- Born: 23 November 1938; Lapua, Finland
- Died: 17 December 2006 (aged 68); Seinäjoki, Finland
- Awards: Jussi for Best Supporting Actor; 1990 The Match Factory Girl

Esko Nikkari (23 November 1938 – 17 December 2006) was a prolific Finnish actor who made more than 70 appearances on film and television. He was born in Lapua, and made his screen debut in 1974 in the movie Karvat.

Nikkari was a workhorse of the Kaurismäki brothers, with whom he first worked on Rikos ja rangaistus in 1983. His last role with Aki Kaurismäki was in Man without a Past in 2002. He starred in the 1994 film Aapo opposite actors such as Taisto Reimaluoto, Ulla Koivuranta and Kai Lehtinen. More recently, he has appeared in a number of Timo Koivusalo films such as Kaksipäisen kotkan varjossa (2005), which is the last full-length movie he appeared in. He died in Seinäjoki.

== Filmography ==
=== Film ===
- Syöksykierre (1981) - Kalevi
- Poste restante (1982)
- Arvottomat (1982) - Hagström
- Koomikko (1983) - Potilas
- Rikos ja Rangaistus (1983) - Inspector Pennanen
- Klaani - tarina Sammakoitten suvusta (1984) - Poliisietsivä
- Niskavuori (1984) - Nikulan isäntä
- Hei kliffaa hei (1985) - Poliisi
- Shadows in Paradise (1986) - Co-worker (työkaveri)
- Macbeth (1987) - Einari
- Jäähyväiset presidentille (1987) - Businessman at the Restaurant
- Tilinteko (1987) - Timo Varjola
- Hamlet Goes Business (1987) - Polonius
- Pohjanmaa (1988) - Paavo Hakala
- Ariel (1988) - Autokauppias
- Ihmiselon ihanuus ja kurjuus (1988) - Manager at Restaurant
- Cha Cha Cha (1989) - Policeman
- Talvisota (1989) - Private Yrjö 'Ylli' Alanen
- The Match Factory Girl (1990) - Stepfather
- Rampe & Naukkis - Kaikkien aikojen superpari (1990) - Older Cop
- Veturimiehet heiluttaa (1992) - Trainman Kauno Saario
- Vääpeli Körmy ja etelän hetelmät (1992) - Pohjalainen talonostaja
- Papukaijamies (1992) - Constable Palmunen
- Pekko aikamiespoika (1993) - poliisi Reino
- Kaikki pelissä (1994) - Rural Police Chief Louhela
- Aapo (1994) - Maanviljelysneuvos
- Pekko ja poika (1994) - Reino, poliisi
- Kivenpyörittäjän kylä (1995) - Jalmari
- Pekko ja massahurmaaja (1995) - Reino, poliisi
- Drifting Clouds (1996) - Ravintolapäällikkö
- Pekko ja muukalainen (1996) - Reino Kuovi, poliisi
- Tie naisen sydämeen (1996) - Cab Driver Lehtonen
- The Minister of State (1997) - Judge
- Vaiennut kylä (1997) - Jarva, police officer
- Pekko ja unissakävelijä (1997) - Reino Kuovi, poliisi
- Kuningasjätkä (1998) - Hannes
- Rikos & Rakkaus (1999) - Kasimir 'Kassu' Vartio
- The Swan and the Wanderer (1999) - Veikko
- Juha (1999) - Nimismies
- Lakeuden kutsu (1999) - Paavo Hakala
- Hurmaava joukkoitsemurha (2000) - Sakari Piippo
- Pieni pyhiinvaellus (2000) - Pappi
- Rentun ruusu (2001) - Väiski
- Ponterosa (2001) - Maalaisisäntä
- The Man Without a Past (2002) - Bank Robber
- Umur (2002) - Samanmoinen
- Sibelius (2003) - Red Soldier #2
- Vieraalla maalla (2003) - Beadle
- Shadow of the Eagle (2005) - Aaro's father
- Isiä ja Hirviöitä (2005, Video short) - Vaari (final film role)

=== Television ===
- Lentsu (1990) - Autoilija Toivo Kesseli
- Hyvä veli (1995) - Matti Yli-Niemi
- Maigret en Finlande (1996) - Liikanen
- Kotikatu (1997-1998) - Pajala
- Team Ahma (1998) - Tiepalvelupäällikkö
- Kylmäverisesti sinun (2000–2002) - Patologi / Oikeuslääkäri

== Awards and recognitions ==
- Humanismin käsi Award 1988
- Jussi Award 1991
