= The Storage 2 =

The Storage
- Directed by: Taru Mäkelä
- Written by: Veli-Pekka Hänninen
- Produced by: Markku Tuurna
- Cinematography: Jouko Seppälä
- Edited by: Antti Tuomikoski
- Music by: Raoul Björkenheim
- Production company: Kinosto
- Release date: 16 February 2018
- Running time: 98 minutes
- Country: Finland
- Language: Finnish
- Budget: €1,102,000 (SES €440,000)

The Storage 2 (Finnish: Varasto 2) is a 2018 Finnish comedy film directed by Taru Mäkelä and written by Veli-Pekka Hänninen. It serves as a sequel to the 2011 film The Storage. Like its predecessor, the film has been described as a working-class comedy. The central characters are the same—Rousku, Raninen, and Karita—while the supporting cast is largely unchanged, with the addition of Rousku and Karita's teenage daughter Jessica. The character Ritva is given a larger role, alongside two new friends, Ene and Kirsti. The roles of the store manager and Kataja are reduced compared to the first film.

The plot follows the misadventures of Rousku and Raninen as they establish a renovation company and engage in questionable activities, including smuggling alcohol from Tallinn to Helsinki.

== Plot ==
The film centers on Antero Rousku, a hardware store worker, and his friend Raninen. Rousku lives with Karita, and their daughter Jessica is now a teenager. The film disregards the epilogue of Varasto, in which Raninen wins the lottery, and instead portrays him as unemployed and broke. Rousku, too, becomes jobless due to his abrasive nature and poor customer service skills. Together, Rousku and Raninen start a construction business, stealing customers from a communist competitor, Jylhäkorpi, and supplies from Rousku's former employer, Kataja's hardware store. However, their lack of professional skills leads to consistent failures. The script humorously highlights Finnish workers' incompetence and laziness, in contrast to the diligence and efficiency of foreign labor.

Eventually, Rousku and Raninen find that smuggling alcohol from Tallinn is more profitable than renovation work. They make a significant amount of money before being caught by authorities. While avoiding criminal charges, Rousku is forced to marry Karita. Raninen, meanwhile, begins a romance with an Estonian police officer.

Ritva, Karita's mother, continues to clash with Rousku but becomes the accountant for their business. She also performs karaoke, dates the store manager, and shares life advice with Jessica. In the film's conclusion, Raninen's girlfriend reveals she is pregnant.

== Reception ==
Hannu Liekso of Episodi criticized the film, stating, "The sequel to the charming comedy from seven years ago lacks both humor and a solid story." He described the plot as stagnant and the humor as mild and conventional, giving the film one star out of five.

In contrast, Elokuvauutiset.fi considered The Storage 2 superior to its predecessor, praising its improved visuals and technical execution, though noting it as merely entertaining rather than memorable. The site awarded the film three stars out of five.

The Storage 2 attracted around 95,000 viewers in Finnish theaters, a modest result compared to the 200,000 viewers for Varasto. The budget for the sequel was €1,102,000, compared to €748,000 for the original.

== Home media ==
Varasto 2 has been released on both Blu-ray and DVD. Special features on the Blu-ray include Making of Varasto 2, a social media compilation, and a trailer. The Blu-ray features a 1.85:1 aspect ratio and DTS HD Master Audio 7.1 sound, along with 5.1 and stereo options.

== Cast ==
- Kari-Pekka Toivonen as Antero Rousku
- Minttu Mustakallio as Karita
- Aku Hirviniemi as Raninen
- Hannele Lauri as Ritva, Karita's mother
- Emilia Karilampi as Jessica, Rousku and Karita's daughter
- Satu Paavola as Kadri
- Niina Koponen as Liina
- Leena Uotila as Ene
- Ulla Tapaninen as Kirsti
- Pirkko Hämäläinen as Teacher
- Taina West as Social Worker
- Tarmo Ruubel as Tiler
- Anna-Leena Härkönen as HR Manager
- Juha Muje as Store Manager
- Vesa Vierikko as Jylhäkorpi
- Esko Salminen as Kataja
