= Martti Katajisto =

Finnish actor (1926–2000)

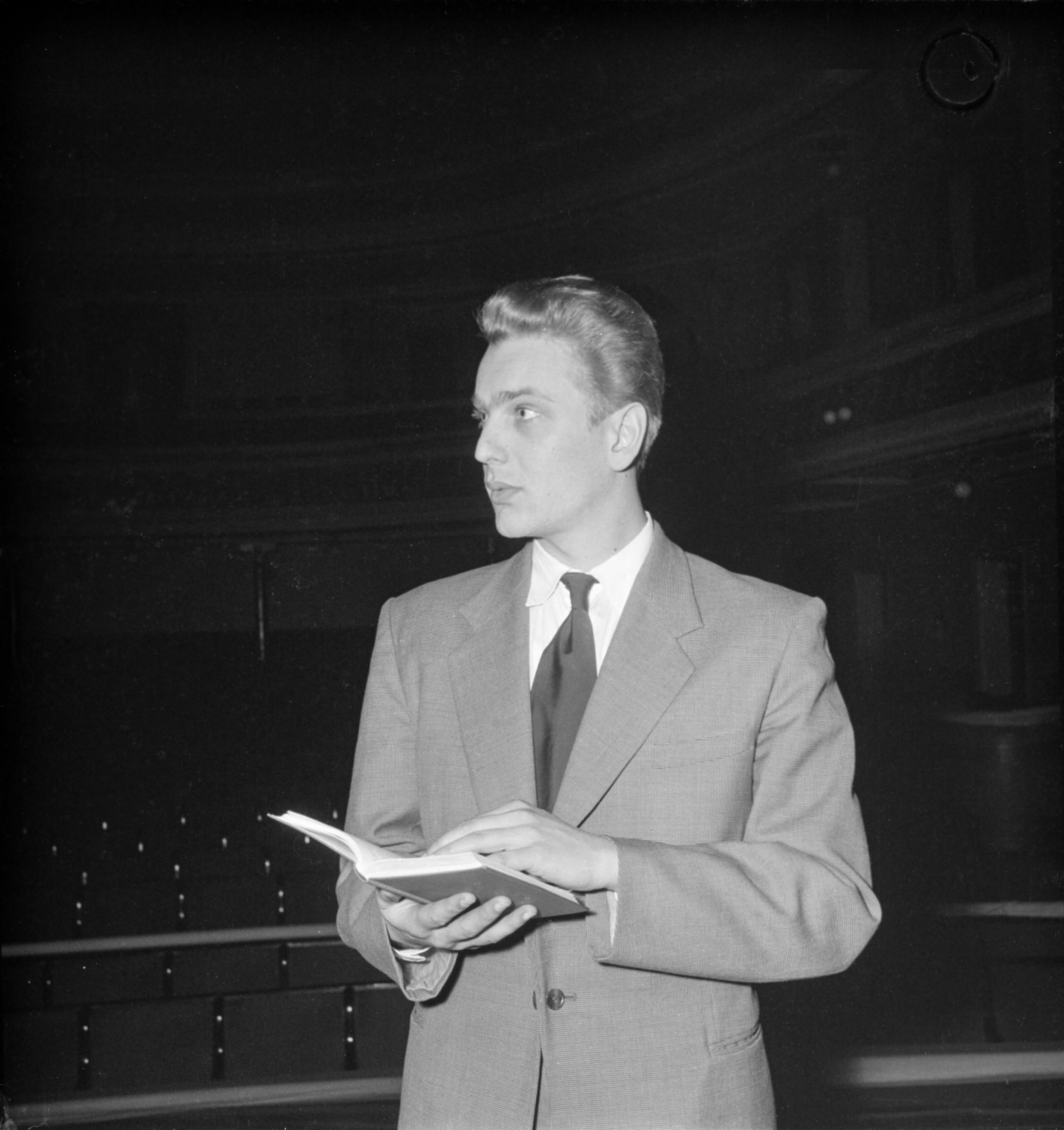
Katajisto in 1957

Martti Viljami Katajisto (6 December 1926 – 25 January 2000) was a Finnish actor. He is best remembered as a young and angry man Nokia in a film Ihmiset suviyössä (1948). For this role, he received a Jussi Award as the best actor in a leading role.

== Theatrical career ==
At the beginning of his career, Katajisto became known as a favorite of teenage girls', but later he also appeared in a number of major theatre classics. Katajisto was employed by the Finnish National Theatre from 1954 until his retirement. During his theatrical career, he was seen in such classics as The Brothers Karamazov, The Ghost Sonata, The Taming of the Shrew, Romeo and Juliet and The Merchant of Venice.

== In films ==
Martti Katajisto's breakthrough in cinema came in 1948 with a Valentin Vaala film Ihmiset suviyössä. His character Nokia has been interpreted as the first homosexual male character in Finnish film history. In 1949, he was seen as Prince Florestan in Prinsessa Ruusunen, a Finnish adaptation of Sleeping Beauty. With this role, Katajisto started to think that he would always be typecast in the pretty boy roles.

Katajisto's film career dried up in the 1960s, at the beginning of the actors' strike. In the 1970s and 1980s, he was only seen in two new movies. Towards the end of the century, his film career became a little more active. He received critical acclaim in 1993 for his role as a father with dementia in a Veikko Aaltonen film Isä meidän. His final film role came in 1999 in a Timo Koivusalo film Kulkuri ja joutsen. He made an ironic portrayal of the man he had worked for decades ago, a Finnish movie mogul T. J. Särkkä.

== Filmography ==
- Nuoruus sumussa (1946)
- Toukokuun taika (1948)
- Laulava sydän (1948)
- Laitakaupungin laulu (1948)
- Ihmiset suviyössä (1948)
- Hormoonit valloillaan (1948)
- Haaviston Leeni (1948)
- Vain kaksi tuntia (1949)
- Prinsessa Ruusunen (1949)
- Katupeilin takana (1949)
- Kanavan laidalla (1949)
- Orpopojan valssi (1950)
- Maija löytää sävelen (1950)
- Katarina kaunis leski (1950)
- Yhden yön hinta (1952)
- Niskavuoren Heta (1952)
- Jälkeen syntiinlankeemuksen (1953)
- Mä oksalla ylimmällä (1954)
- Nukkekauppias ja kaunis Lilith (1955)
- Niskavuori taistelee (1957)
- Sven Tuuva (1958)
- Yks' tavallinen Virtanen (1959)
- Nina ja Erik (1960)
- Hänen olivat linnut (1976)
- Suuri illusioni (1985)
- Isä meidän (1993)
- Aatamin poika (1995)
- Kulkuri ja joutsen (1999)
