= Vierikko =

Vierikko is a surname. Notable people with the surname include:

- Helena Vierikko (born 1980), Finnish actress, daughter of Vesa
- Vesa Vierikko (born 1956), Finnish actor
