= Back in the USSR (disambiguation) =

"Back in the U.S.S.R." is a 1968 song by the Beatles.

Back in the USSR may also refer to:

- CHOBA B CCCP, or Back in the USSR, a 1988 album by Paul McCartney
- Back in the USSR (film), a 1992 American thriller film
- "Back in the USSR" (NCIS: Sydney), a 2025 television episode

== See also ==
- Back to the USSR, a 1992 Finnish dramedy film
