= Shadow of the Eagle =

Shadow of the Eagle may refer to:

- Shadow of the Eagle (1950 film), a British film
- Shadow of the Eagle (2005 film), a Finnish film

== See also ==
- The Shadow of the Eagle, a 1932 Mascot film serial
