= Unna ja Nuuk =

Finnish film

- Directed by: Saara Cantell
- Written by: Sami Keski-Vähälä; Pekka Mandart
- Produced by: Pamela Mandart
- Starring: Rosa Salomaa, Toni Leppe, Esko Salminen, Meri Nenonen, Jenni Banerjee, Tommi Korpela, Taisto Reimaluoto, etc.
- Cinematography: Heikki Färm
- Edited by: Jukka Nykänen
- Music by: Herman Rechberger
- Distributed by: FS Film Oy
- Release date: 20 January 2006
- Running time: 83 min.
- Country: Finland
- Languages: Finnish, Early Proto-Finnic
- Budget: EUR 1,325,000

Unna ja Nuuk is a Finnish family film that debuted in Finland on 20 January 2006. Directed by Saara Cantell, its screenplay was written by Joona Tena and Sami Keski-Vähälä. Unna ja Nuuk stars Rosa Salomaa, Toni Leppe, Esko Salminen, Meri Nenonen, Jenni Banerjee, Tommi Korpela, etc. Much of the film's dialogue is written in a version of the Proto-Finnic language, which was reconstructed by lector Jouko Koivisto.

The movie had a budget of approximately €1.3 million and was produced by Mandart Entertainment Ltd. The movie featured in the Berlin Film Festival in February 2006.

== Film festivals ==
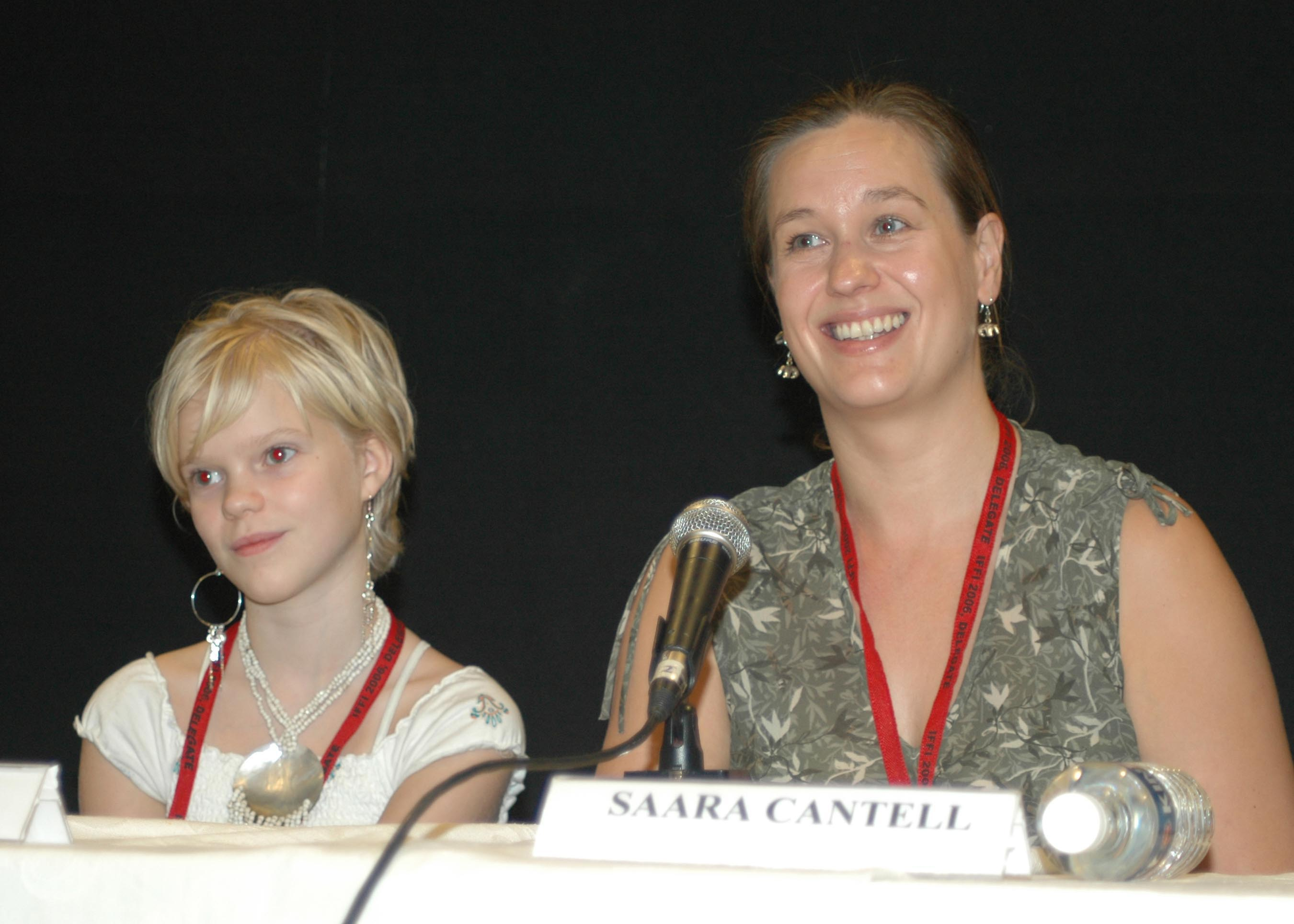
Saara Cantell and Rosa Salomaa addressing a press conference at IFFI (2006)

== Awards ==
In 2006, Unna ja Nuuk received a 2nd place category award at the Giffoni Film Festival in Italy.
