= Kai Lehtinen =

Finnish actor (born 1958)

- Born: 31 July 1958 (age 67); Kerava, Finland

Kai Lehtinen (born Kai Antero; 31 July 1958, in Kerava, Finland) is a Finnish actor best known for his work in the Finnish TV-series Raid.

== Career ==
Lehtinen originally began as an athlete and competed in the decathlon with a personal best of 6,265 points in 1981.

He then became interested in acting in the 1980s and began his career in 1989 appearing on a mini TV series. He appeared in 6 episodes of the 1993 television series Viimeiset siemenperunat and in 1994, he appeared in the Finnish film Aapo alongside actors Taisto Reimaluoto and Ulla Koivuranta.

In 1996, he appeared in the short TV movie Aatamin poika.

Lehtinen is also credited with directing and writing several films. He is perhaps best known for his role in highly successful Raid TV series (2001) where he played the title role.

== Personal life ==
Lehtinen married Pirjo Viheriäkoski on 27 July 2002. His 18-year-old son died in a fire in 2007.

== Selected filmography ==
- Aapo (1994)
- Aatamin poika (1996)
- Siivoton juttu (1997)
- Poliisin poika (1998)
- Ambush (1999)
- The Swan and the Wanderer (1999)
- Raid (2003)
- Shadow of the Eagle (2005)
- The Missile (Ohjus) - 2024
