= Kalteva torni =

- Directed by: Timo Koivusalo
- Written by: Timo Koivusalo
- Produced by: Timo Koivusalo
- Starring: Martti Suosalo; Liisa Kuoppamäki; Mats Långbacka; Mika Räinä; Risto Salmi; Seela Sella; Laura Jurkka
- Production company: Artista-Filmi Oy
- Distributed by: Buena Vista International
- Release date: 20 October 2006
- Running time: 96 minutes
- Country: Finland
- Language: Finnish

Kalteva torni (English: The Leaning Tower) is a 2006 Finnish comedy film, directed by Timo Koivusalo. It premiered in Finland on 20 October 2006.

The leading roles are played by Martti Suosalo, Seela Sella, Liisa Kuoppamäki, Siiri Suosalo, Esko Nikkari, Mats Långbacka, Laura Jurkka, Jemina Sillanpää] and Risto Salmi.

It is the story of a benevolent man who does not know he has multiple personalities. His greatest fear is that he will not be able to see the Leaning Tower of Pisa before it falls. His adventures lead him into tricky situations and, eventually, he does see it.
