= Olavi Tuomi =

Matti Olavi "Ola" Tuomi (22 May 1932 – 14 November 2006) was a Finnish cinematographer, chief lighting technician and actor.

Tuomi started to work for Suomen Filmiteollisuus at the age of 15. His first major work was being one of the cinematographers of the Edvin Laine film The Unknown Soldier (1955). He continued to work for Laine both as a cinematographer and an assistant director up until the end of Laine's career. Tuomi also worked in several Aki Kaurismäki films, such as Tulitikkutehtaan tyttö, Kauas pilvet karkaavat and Mies vailla menneisyyttä. He was also occasionally seen in films as an actor.

Olavi Tuomi was the director of photography in more than 40 Finnish films during his career that covered nearly 60 years. He received three Jussi Awards for best cinematography; for movies Pojat (1962), Isä meidän (1993) and Merisairas (1996).

== Selected filmography as a cinematographer ==
- Pekka ja Pätkä Suezilla (1958)
- Kohtalo tekee siirron (1959)
- Kankkulan kaivolla (1960)
- Komisario Palmun erehdys (1960)
- Pojat (1962)
- Kuu on vaarallinen (1962)
- Meiltähän tämä käy (1973)
- Hyvästi ennen aamua (1989)
- Isä meidän (1993)
- Merisairas (1995)
