= Kuoppamäki =

Kuoppamäki is a Finnish surname that may refer to

- Jukka Kuoppamäki (born 1942), Finnish singer, songwriter and priest
- Liisa Mustonen (Kuoppamäki, born 1969), Finnish film actress, former wife of Sami
- Sami Kuoppamäki (born 1971), Finnish drummer
