= Saaristo =

Saaristo is a Finnish surname. Notable people with the surname include:

- Anneli Saaristo (born 1949), Finnish singer and actress
- Julius Saaristo (1891–1969), Finnish track athlete
- Michael Saaristo (1938–2008), Finnish arachnologist
