= Liisa Mustonen =

Finnish actress

- Born: 13 October 1969 (age 56); Helsinki, Finland

Liisa Mustonen (previously Liisa Kuoppamäki, born 13 October 1969 in Helsinki, Finland) is a Finnish film actress.

Mustonen began her career in 1986 working in film, she mainly appeared on television between 2000 and 2004. In 2006, she appeared in the Timo Koivusalo film Kalteva torni which co-stars Martti Suosalo and Seela Sella.

Between the years 2001 and 2008 she was married to drummer Sami Kuoppamäki.

== Selected filmography ==
- Stripping (2002)
