= Sari Havas =

Finnish actress

- Born: 25 January 1962 (age 64); Kolari, Finland

Sari Havas (born 25 January 1962 in Kolari, Finland) is a Finnish actress.

Havas began her career in acting in 1986 in the film Born American but has mostly appeared on television in Finland and has also written a number of TV series since 1990. She recently appeared in the 2006 film Saippuaprinssi in which she worked with Mikko Leppilampi, Pamela Tola and Teijo Eloranta.

Havas was married to actor Pertti Sveholm from 1993 to 2007 and they have two children, of whom Asta Sveholm, born in 1994, is also an actress.

== Filmography ==
- The Christmas Party, 1996
- Young Love, 2001
