= Jingle Bells (2022 film) =

- Finnish: Kulkuset kulkuset
- Directed by: Taru Mäkelä
- Written by: Kristofer Gummerus; Taru Mäkelä
- Based on: Holy Mess (2015) by Helena Bergström
- Produced by: Aleksi Hyvärinen
- Starring: Christoffer Strandberg; Martti Suosalo; Eeva Litmanen
- Production company: Don Films
- Distributed by: Nordisk Film
- Release date: 28 October 2022
- Running time: 98 minutes
- Country: Finland
- Language: Finnish

Jingle Bells (Finnish: Kulkuset kulkuset) is a 2022 Finnish comedy film directed by Taru Mäkelä. It was released on 28 October 2022, and produced by Aleksi Hyvärinen under Don Films. The film was distributed by Nordisk Film.

The film is based on the Swedish movie Holy Mess (2015) directed by Helena Bergström. The screenplay was adapted by Kristofer Gummerus and Taru Mäkelä.

The story revolves around two blended families meeting for the first time during a Christmas dinner, leading to humorous and heartfelt moments.

== Cast ==
- Christoffer Strandberg
- Martti Suosalo
- Eeva Litmanen
- Ali Jahangiri
- Pirkko Hämäläinen
- Sari Siikander
- Antti Tuomas Heikkinen
