= Arto Salminen =

Finnish writer (born 1959)

Arto Salminen (22 October 1959 – 15 November 2005) was a Finnish writer known for his social commentary.

Salminen, who was born on 22 October 1959 in Helsinki, had also worked as a journalist and taxi driver; he wrote six novels which criticised, with a morbid black sense of humour, such current phenomena in Finnish society as neoliberal politics, the decline of the welfare state, tabloid media, reality television and so on. His books gained a small cult following in Finland and they also received excellent reviews even though they did not sell particularly well.

His 1998 novel Varasto (Stockroom), in which the stockroom of a paint company becomes a microcosm of contemporary Finland, was dramatized for the theater in 2005.

Salminen received the Koskenkorva Prize in 1998, and the Olvi Prize in 2004. He was also a Runeberg Literary Award finalist in 2002. He died of a sudden stroke at Hausjärvi on 15 November 2005.

Salminen's novel Varasto was posthumously adapted as a comedy film, The Storage, in 2011.

== Bibliography ==
- Turvapaikka (1995)
- Varasto (1998)
- Paskateoria (2001)
- Ei-kuori (2003)
- Lahti (2004)
- Kalavale (2005)
