= Raid (2003 film) =

- Poster
- Directed by: Tapio Piirainen
- Written by: Harri Nykänen; Tapio Piirainen
- Produced by: Claes Olsson
- Starring: Kai Lehtinen; Mari Rantasila; Oiva Lohtander; Pekka Huotari; Juha Muje; Kirsti Väänänen
- Cinematography: Timo Heinänen
- Edited by: Kauko Lindfors
- Music by: Pekka Marjanen
- Production company: Kinoproduction
- Release date: 31 January 2003 (Finland)
- Running time: 125 minutes
- Country: Finland
- Language: Finnish
- Budget: €1.5 million
- Box office: €744,053

Raid is a 2003 Finnish crime film directed by Tapio Piirainen. It is an adaptation of the 2000 television series of the same name (itself based on the novel series of the same name by Harri Nykänen). The screenplay was written by Nykänen and Piirainen.

== Cast ==
- Kai Lehtinen as Raid
- Mari Rantasila as Tarja
- Oiva Lohtander as Police Lieutenant Jansson
- Kirsti Väänänen as Sergeant Susisaari
- Pekka Huotari as Police Sergeant Huusko
- Juha Muje as Sundman
- Markku Maalismaa as Horseman (Ratsumies)
- Harry Baer as Mark Hollander
- Lia Boysen as Venla
- Jorma Tommila as French Foreign Legionary
- Seppo Kulmala as Ponytail (Poninhäntä)
- Erik Kiviniemi as Scarface (Arpinaama)
