= Tarja-Tuulikki Tarsala =

Finnish actress

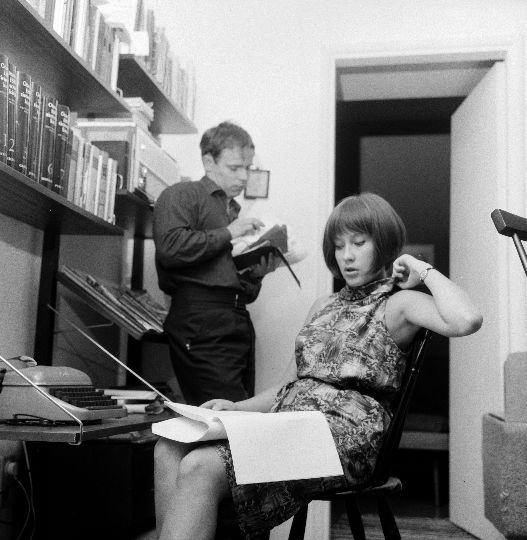
- Tarsala with her husband Ere Kokkonen in 1964.
- Born: 4 September 1937; Helsinki, Finland
- Died: 9 May 2007 (aged 69); Helsinki, Finland
- Other name: Tarja-Tuulikki Tarsala-Salmi
- Occupation: Actress
- Spouses: Ere Kokkonen (m. 1960; divource 1970) Sauli Salmi (m. 1973; died 1997)

Tarja-Tuulikki Tarsala (4 September 1937 – 9 May 2007) was a Finnish film actress. She was the wife of the director Ere Kokkonen.

Tarsala was awarded the Pro Finlandia Medal of the Order of the Lion of Finland in 1998. In 2001, Tarsala won the Jussi Award for Best Supporting Actress for her performance in Bad Luck Love.

== Selected filmography ==
Year	Title	Role	Notes
1967	Pähkähullu Suomi	Miss Smith	
1969	Näköradiomiehen ihmeelliset siekailut	Sirkku	
1972	Eight Deadly Shots (Kahdeksan surmanluotia)	Pasi's wife	
1979	Wonderman (Ihmemies)	Tuula Korkeamäki	
1987	Uuno Turhapuro – kaksoisagentti	Secretary of concert hall	
1992	Shear Fear (Kauhun millimetrit)	Marja's mother	
1992	Back to the USSR (Takaisin Ryssiin)	Widow	
1995	Lipton Cockton in the Shadows of Sodoma	She-Detective	
2000	Bad Luck Love	Irja	
2000	A Charming Mass Suicide (Hurmaava joukkoitsemurha)	Psychiatrist	
2004	Uuno Turhapuro – This Is My Life	Enni	
2004	Popular Music (Populärmusik från Vittula)	Grandmother	
2007	The Year of the Wolf (Suden vuosi)	Aunt Liselott	
2007	A Man's Work (Miehen työ)	Travel agency employee	
