= Rentun Ruusu =

2001 Finnish film by Timo Koivusalo

- Theatrical release poster
- Directed by: Timo Koivusalo
- Written by: Timo Koivusalo; Vexi Salmi
- Produced by: Timo Heinänen
- Starring: Martti Suosalo, Ilkka Koivula
- Production company: Artista Filmi Oy
- Distributed by: Buena Vista International
- Release date: 12 January 2001
- Running time: 100 minutes
- Country: Finland
- Language: Finnish

Rentun Ruusu (English: The Rose of the Rascal) is a 2001 Finnish biographical film drama directed and written by Timo Koivusalo. The film is based on the life of Antti Yrjö Hammarberg (Irwin Goodman) who is still today a very popular singer in Finland. The film stars Martti Suosalo and Ilkka Koivula with Vexi Salmi as narrator. The film premiered in Helsinki on 12 January 2001. The name Rentun ruusu is from Irwin Goodman's song, and the album Rentun ruusu was his biggest and sold 125,000 copies.

By 5 April 2001 it took $2,236,169 at the box office, and it was the most watched Finnish movie of 2001. The film won an award and nomination at the Jussi Awards.

== Cast ==
=== Main cast ===
- Martti Suosalo ... Irwin Goodman
- Ilkka Koivula ... Vexi Salmi
- Vexi Salmi ... Narrator
- Esko Nikkari ... Väiski
- Eeva-Maija Haukinen ... Irwin's mom, Kirsti Hammarberg
- Hannu Kivioja ... Kaspar
- Riitta Salminen ... Riitta Feirikki-Hammarberg
- Matti Mäntylä ... Toivo Kärki
- Tom Lindholm ... Eikka
- Kunto Ojansivu ... Alpo
- Raimo Grönberg ... Honkanen
- Mikko Kivinen ... Tappi Suojanen
- Seppo Sallinen ... Keihänen
- Erkki Ruokokoski ... Ilmari Kianto
- Timo Julkunen ... Mape
- Maarit Niiniluoto ... Radiohaastattelija
- Harri Ekonen ... Lentäjä 1
- Aimo Santaoja ... Lentäjä 2
- Matti Nurminen ... Taksikuski torilla
- Kai Tanner ... Taksikuski lentokentällä
- Raimo Viitanen ... Nimismies
- Seppo Helenius ... Virkamies
- Risto Luukko ... Tuomari
- Sonja Saarinen ... Kaija
- Tapani Mäki ... Vartija 2
- Johanna Jokela ... Nuori ihailijatyttö

=== Minor cast ===
- Jevgeni Haukka ... Venäläinen tullimies 1
- Martti-Mikael Järvinen ... Otto
- Timo Nissi ... Eki
- Martti Palo ... Erik Lindström
- Alexander Pritoup ... Venäläinen tullimies 2
- Taneli Rinne ... Verotarkastaja
- Raino Rissanen ... Vartija 1
- Kielo Tommila ... Aila
- Andrei Tsumak ... Venäläinen tullimies 3
- Harry Viita ... Ralliperuna
