= Atso Almila =

Finnish composer

Atso Almila (born 13 June 1953, in Helsinki) is a Finnish orchestral conductor, music director, composer, trombonist and teacher.

He has worked with most Finnish orchestras as a guest conductor or otherwise. Though he primarily operates in Finland he also works heavily in Sweden and Estonia. His composition style may be deemed neo-classical though he has been seen to be sometimes chromatic and expressive (as in his 1985 Flute Concerto and his 1989 Violin Concerto). His works show appreciation for the individual instrument and for natural musicianship.

He studied the trombone and orchestral conducting at the Sibelius Academy of Helsinki under Jorma Panula graduating in orchestral conducting in 1979. He would later work in the institution as the senior assistant in conducting between 1991 and 2002 and a lecturer in orchestral conducting since 2002. He has been the conductor of several choirs including the Radio Symphony Choir (1975–1976), Sibelius Academy chamber choir Cantemus (1979–1984) and the Akateeminen Laulu choir (1991–1995). He has also served as the conductor of the Tampere Philharmonic Orchestra (1987–1989) and the Joensuu Municipal Orchestra between 1993 and 2000 (of which he also been the artistic chief). He was the music director and the artistic director of the Kuopio Symphony Orchestra between 1995 and 2000 after which he became the Principal Guest Conductor of the Seinäjoki City Orchestra where he has been since. He was also the musical director of the National Theatre of Finland between 1982 and 1995 and has been the conductor of the Finnish National Opera (1980–1987 and 1989–1995). At the FNO he has conducted Einojuhani Rautavaara's Vincent, Markus Fagerudd's Gaia, Vajda's Mario and the Magician and Igor Stravinsky's The Nightingale. In 1982 he won the Norrköping Nordic Conducting Competition along with Jukka-Pekka Saraste.

His compositions include four operas: Kolmekymmentä hopearahaa (Thirty Pieces of Silver) in 1988, Ameriikka (America) in 1992, Isontaloon Antti (Antti Isotalo) in 2000, and Pohjanmaan kautta (Bottoms Up!) in 2002. They are usually based around folk plots and often incorporate folk music - though they are not folk opera due to the presence of musical development and structural spans. His harmonies are reminiscent of Sergei Prokofiev and Les Six - with the influence of Italian melody in his last two opera. The plot of Kolmekymmentä hopearahaa studies the relationship between a revivalist minister and those around him (both lay and clergy) and is based upon a play by Heikki Ylikangas. Ameriikka is a study of love and long-distance relationships: a miner goes to America leaving his fiancée behind - her imagination leads her to jealousy and she decides to pursue him across the Atlantic Ocean. Isontaloon Antti follows a recruiting Jägare who, after returning from training in Germany, is pursued by the police for this allegiance. The libretti of both Ameriikka and Isontaloon Antti's were written by Antti Tuuri. Pohjanmaan kautta, with a libretto by Tiina Puumalainen, tells a story of Prohibition on the Ostrobothnian plains. All productions have premiered in Ilmajoki and are usually performed outdoors.

His music is characterised as being wistful and restless, featuring playful melodies and brusque ostinatos. They often emphasise brass instruments, and include two symphonies including one for brass quintet and orchestra (notable for its aleatoric counterpoint), concerti (double bass in 1979, flute in 1985, tuba in 1986, violin in 1989 and trombone in 1994) and chamber music (importantly, a Wind Quartet and a String Quintet, both of 1993; also Taikalamppu for brass quartet, Dedications, Memories (1985) for brass quintet, the Wind Nonet (1985) and the Brass Quintet (1991)). His wind band work is traditional and tonal which may be described as Gebrauchsmusik and he sometimes borrows from popular music. These works include Concert March (1979), Allegro agitato (1986) and Fanfare (1987), the larger-scale Concerto for Two Clarinets and Wind Band (1980) and Visions from the North (1997). This work includes some for theatre (roughly 40 plays), television and film. His screen work includes Da Capo in 1985 and Kotia päin in 1989.

For many years he has been teaching in Sibelius Academy. Almost all conducting students who have studied there in 1980-s, 1990-s and in 21st century have also studied with him. He also has many masterclasses, the annual one is in August in Seinäjoki.

== Selected discography ==
- Concertos for Tuba, French Horn and Trombone (Oulu symphony Orchestra 1996)
- Contrabasso concertante - Finalndia (Jorma Katrama and Kuopio Symphony 1998)
- Sibelius Rarities (Kuopio Symphony 1999 - Finlandia)
- Piazzolla - Finlandia (Mika Vayrynen and Kuopio Symphony 2000)
