= Harri Nykänen =

Finnish crime writer (1953–2023)

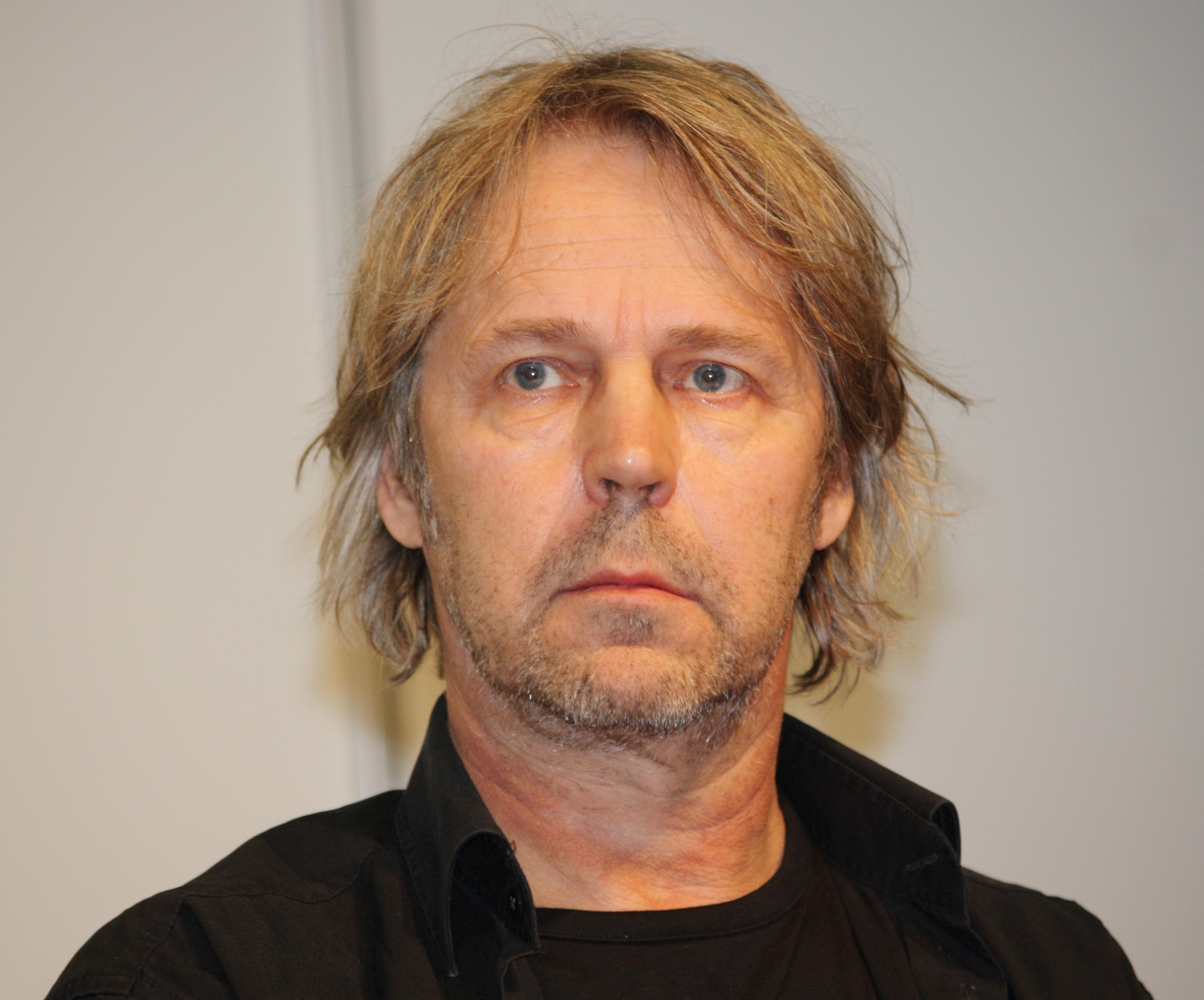
- Born: 20 June 1953; Helsinki, Finland
- Died: 21 March 2023 (aged 69); Helsinki, Finland
- Writing career
- Genre: crime fiction
- Notable work: Raid series

Harri Kalervo Nykänen (20 June 1953 – 21 March 2023) was a Finnish crime writer. The film Raid is based on his work.

Nykänen died on 21 March 2023, at the age of 69.
