= Homebound (1989 film) =

- Original Finnish film poster
- Directed by: Ilkka Järvi-Laturi
- Written by: Ilkka Järvi-Laturi; Outi Nyytäjä; Annina Enckell
- Produced by: Heikki Takkinen; Lasse Saarinen
- Starring: Ilkka Koivula; Jonna Järnefelt
- Cinematography: Kjell Lagerroos
- Edited by: Tuula Mehtonen
- Music by: Atso Almila
- Production companies: Filminor; FilmZolfo
- Distributed by: Finnkino
- Release date: 10 March 1989
- Running time: 93 minutes
- Country: Finland
- Language: Finnish
- Budget: FIM 5,073,153

Homebound (Finnish: Kotia päin) is a 1989 Finnish crime drama film directed by Ilkka Järvi-Laturi. It tells the story of a young student who moves 600 kilometres (370 mi) away from his hometown to the capital to study, as he worries about his mother's problematic relationship with a new husband. The film is starring by Ilkka Koivula and Jonna Järnefelt.

The film was Järvi-Laturi's first feature film. According to Järvi-Laturi, he was inspired by the 1986 news headline of Ilta-Sanomat: "The death of the one thrown into the sea was the revenge of the underworld". The news piqued his interest because it gave the impression of organized crime.

== Plot summary ==
Year 1986 in Oulu, Finland. Elli Nyman marries Kauko Kurkela, convicted of murder, in the prison chapel, but Elli's son Mika Uurassalmi does not like his new stepfather. Mika is about to go to Helsinki to study at the University of Technology, and Elli is buying an apartment for her son in the Merihaka district. By chance, Mika meets his old schoolmate Ulla in Helsinki, who has come to work in the capital. After a reserved beginning, a romantic relationship develops between the young people. However, Kurkela's possible tendency to engage in intimate domestic violence causes Mika's everyday life to be disrupted and he has to worry about the well-being of his mother in his childhood home, as well as his own future in the capital with his studies and Ulla.

== Cast ==
- Ilkka Koivula as Mika Uurassalmi
- Jonna Järnefelt as Ulla
- Leena Suomu as Elli Kurkela, née Nyman
- Risto Tuorila as Kauko Kurkela

== Reception ==
Homebound received mixed reviews when it was released. Its factuality was criticized, even though the story did not exactly follow the events that inspired it. Janet Maslin from The New York Times found the film "sordid and solidly unglamorous, the acting performances more opaque than the situation warrants and the ending surprising but an unrevealing one."
