= Vesa Vierikko =

Finnish actor

- Born: Vesa Tapio Vierikko; 24 May 1956 (age 69); Lappeenranta, Finland
- Occupation: Actor

Vesa Tapio Vierikko (born 24 May 1956 in Lappeenranta, Finland) is a Finnish actor.

Vierikko began acting in 1978 on television working consistently throughout the 1980s and 1990s. He starred in the 2003 film Sibelius working with Finnish director Timo Koivusalo and actors such as Martti Suosalo, Heikki Nousiainen and Seela Sella and Miina Turunen. He once again worked with director Koivusalo in Kaksipäisen kotkan varjossa in 2005.

More recently in 2006 he has starred in over 16 episodes of Akkaa päälle.

== Partial filmography ==
- Uuno Turhapuro Loses His Memory (1982)
- The Archer (1982)
- Jon (1983)
- Onks' Viljoo näkyny? (1988)
- The Winter War (Talvisota, 1989)
- The Match Factory Girl (Tulitikkutehtaan tyttö, 1990)
- Hobitit (1993)
- Santa Claus and the Magic Drum (Joulupukki ja noitarumpu, 1996)
- Gold Fever in Lapland (Lapin kullan kimallus, 1999)
- Ponterosa (2001)
- The Book of Fate (Kohtalon kirja, 2003)
- Sibelius (2003)
- Shadow of the Eagle (Kaksipäisen kotkan varjossa, 2005)
- V2: Dead Angel (V2 – Jäätynyt enkeli, 2007)
- The Flight Before Christmas (Niko – Lentäjän poika, 2008)
- One Foot Under (Toinen jalka haudasta, 2009)
- The Storage (2011)
- August Fools (2013)
- The Storage 2 (2018)
