= Anneli Saaristo =

Finnish singer (born 1949)

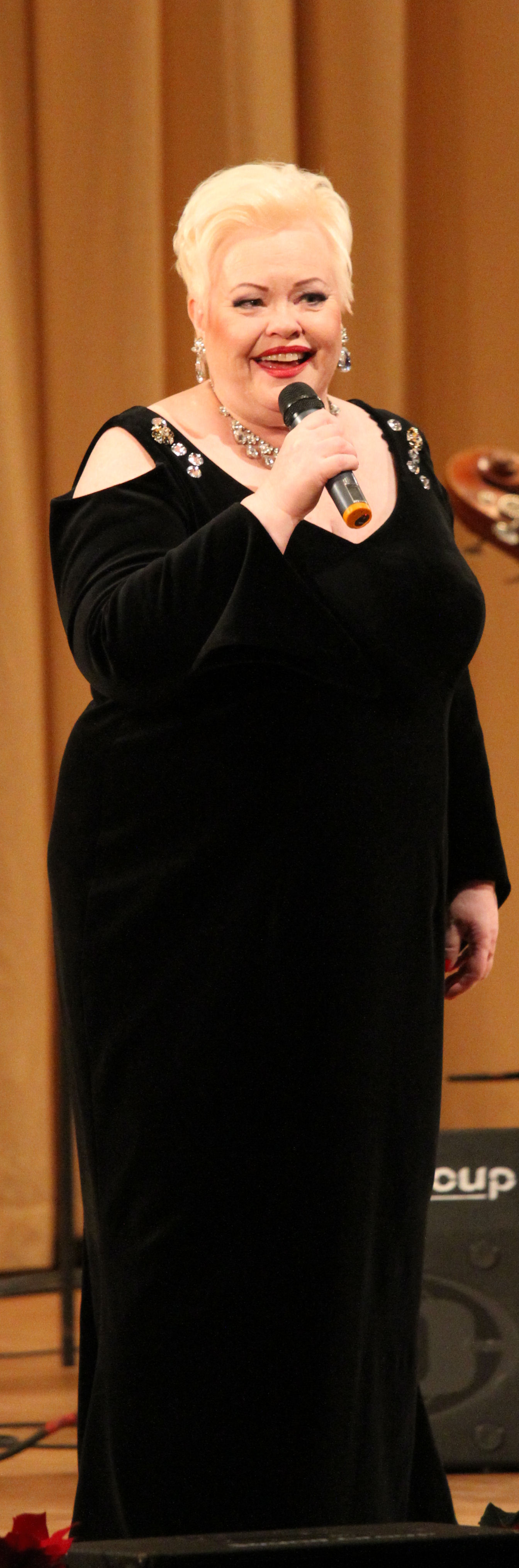

Background information
- Born: Terttu Anneli Orvokki Saaristo; 15 February 1949 (age 77)
- Origin: Jokioinen, Finland
- Genres: Pop
- Occupation: Singer
- Website: Anneli Saaristo

Terttu Anneli Orvokki Saaristo (born 15 February 1949) is a Finnish singer and actress, best known internationally for her participation in the 1989 Eurovision Song Contest.

== Early career ==
Saaristo was born in Jokioinen. She spent the 1970s performing in singing competitions and worked as a dance orchestra singer. Her first album was released in 1980.

== Eurovision Song Contest ==
Saaristo first entered the Finnish Eurovision selection in 1978 with the song "Sinun kanssasi, sinua ilman", which finished fourth. A second attempt in 1984 with "Sä liian paljon vaadit" ended in third place. Saaristo finally got her chance in 1989, when "La dolce vita" was chosen as the Finnish entry for the 34th Eurovision Song Contest, held in Lausanne, Switzerland on 6 May. A song with a distinctly Mediterranean sound and arrangement, "La dolce vita" finished in seventh place of 22 entries, representing Finland's best Eurovision placing for 14 years and making it at the time the country's joint second-highest placement. There was some degree of wry amusement in Finland that this had been achieved with such an un-Finnish sounding song.

== Later career ==
Saaristo maintained her popularity in Finland and since 1980 has released 18 albums, most recently Uskalla Rakastaa in 2009. In 2005, she appeared in the historical film Shadow of the Eagle with Mikko Leppilampi, Helena Vierikko and fellow Eurovision veteran Vesa-Matti Loiri.

== Albums ==
- Aina aika rakkauden (1980)
- Elän hetkessä (1984)
- Näin jäätiin henkiin (1985)
- Tuuli, laivat ja laulu (1987)
- La dolce vita (1989)
- Appelsiinipuita aavikkoon (1992)
- Kypsän naisen blues (1995)
- Helminauha (1999)
- Kaksi sielua (2004)
- Uskalla rakastaa (2009)
- Kissan mieli (2012)

Preceded by Boulevard with Nauravat silmät muistetaan	Finland in the Eurovision Song Contest; 1989	Succeeded by Beat with Fri?
