= August Fools =

- Directed by: Taru Mäkelä
- Written by: Raija Talvio
- Produced by: Markku Flink
- Starring: Kati Outinen
- Cinematography: Jouko Seppälä
- Production company: Kinosto
- Distributed by: Oy Nordisk Film Ab
- Release date: 4 October 2013
- Running time: 103 minutes
- Countries: Finland, Czech Republic

August Fools (Finnish: Mieletön elokuu) is a 2013 comedy film directed by Taru Mäkelä. It is a Finnish-Czech co-production set in Helsinki, Finland in the early 1960s.

== Main cast ==
- Kati Outinen
- Esko Salminen
- Elena Leeve
- Laura Birn
- Tapio Liinoja
- Vesa Vierikko
- Pirkka-Pekka Petelius
- Miroslav Etzler
- Aku Hirviniemi
