= A Summer by the River =

- Theatrical release poster
- Directed by: Markku Pölönen
- Written by: Markku Pölönen
- Produced by: Kari Sara
- Starring: Pertti Koivula; Simo Kontio; Esko Nikkari; Anu Palevaara; Peter Franzén
- Cinematography: Kari Sohlberg
- Edited by: Jukka Nykänen
- Music by: Vesa Mäkinen
- Production company: Fennada-Filmi
- Distributed by: Buena Vista International
- Release date: 9 February 1998
- Running time: 85 minutes
- Country: Finland
- Language: Finnish
- Budget: FIM6,275,088
- Box office: $1.9 million (Finland)

A Summer by the River (Finnish: Kuningasjätkä) is a 1998 Finnish film written and directed by Markku Pölönen. The film is set in the 1950s Eastern Finland and tells the story of father Tenho (Pertti Koivula) and son Topi (Simo Kontio) after Tenho's wife — Topi's mother — dies and leaves the two men unable to pay rent. The two men move out of the family home and spend the summer working as lumberjacks in log driving, sleeping on the riverbank and growing closer together through the experience.

The film was a major success at the 1999 Jussi Awards winning in five categories including Best Film, Best Actor and Best Direction. The film was selected as the Finnish entry for the Best Foreign Language Film at the 71st Academy Awards but was not accepted as a nominee.

== Cast and characters ==
- Pertti Koivula — Tenho
- Simo Kontio — Topi
- Esko Nikkari — Hannes
- Anu Palevaara — Hilkka
- Peter Franzén — Kottarainen

== See also ==
- 1998 in film
- Cinema of Finland
- List of Finnish films: 1990s
- List of submissions to the 71st Academy Awards for Best Foreign Language Film
- List of Finnish submissions for the Academy Award for Best Foreign Language Film
