= Taru Mäkelä =

Finnish film director and screenwriter

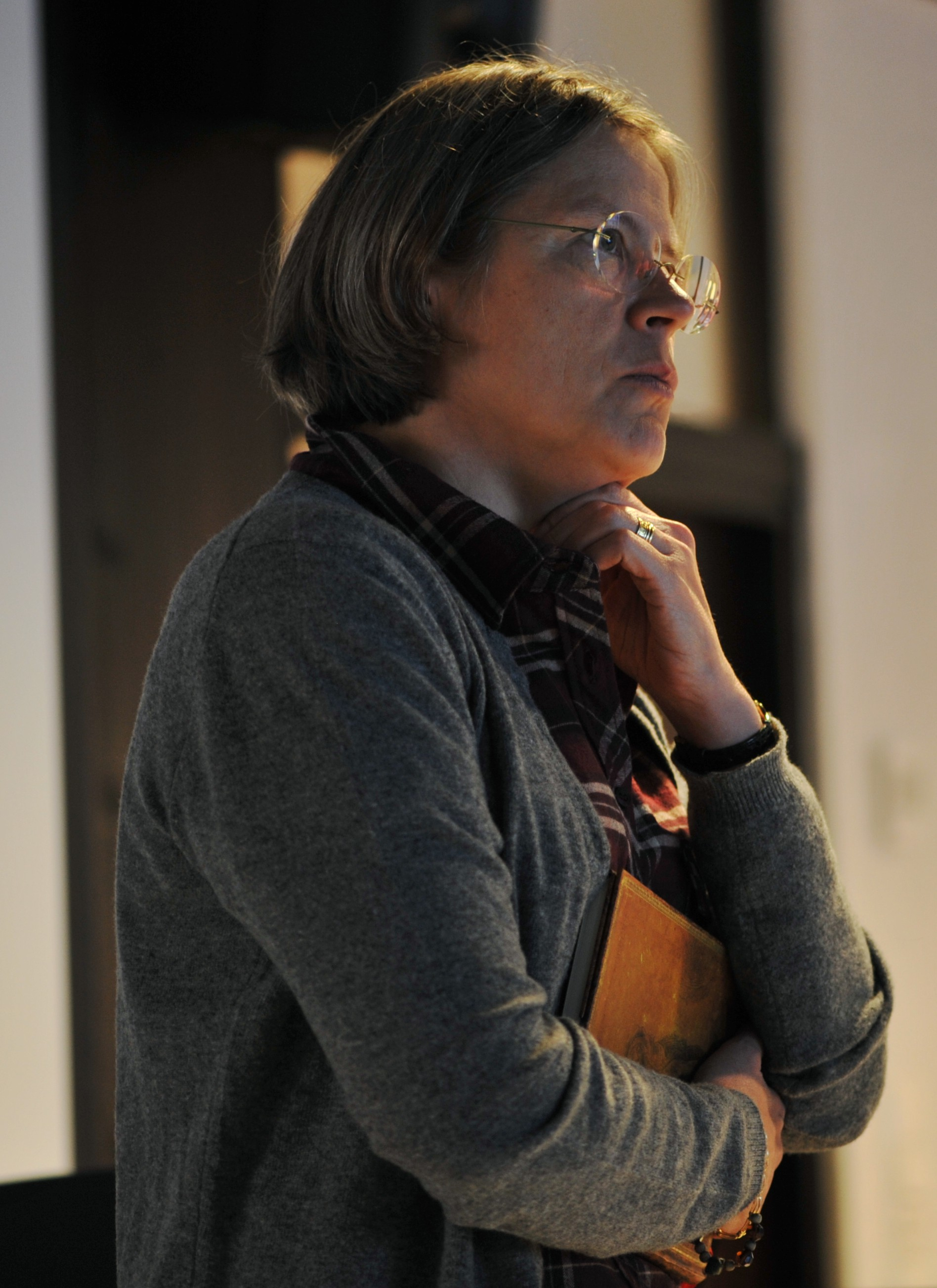
- Mäkelä in October 2011
- Born: 1 April 1959 (age 67); Tampere, Finland
- Occupation: Film director
- Years active: 1983–present

Taru Mäkelä (born 1 April 1959) is a Finnish film director and screenwriter. She started her career in the 1980s working for the Finnish Broadcasting Company.

== Life and career ==
Besides directing and screenwriting, Mäkelä has also worked as a producer, editor and actor.

Mäkelä studied at the Department of Cinematography at the Aalto University School of Arts, Design and Architecture and graduated with a master's degree in art in 1989. She is also a Bachelor of Arts from the University of Helsinki. Mäkelä began her career as a director in the 1980s at YLE, where she wrote and directed the Smiley Lips entertainment series. She has directed three feature films: Little Sister (1999), The Storage (2011) and August Fools (2013). In December 2014, Mäkelä's comedy Eila, Rampe and Likka, based on the characters in Sinikka Nopola's books, premiered.

In 2005–2010, Mäkelä was a member of the Board of the Finnish Film Foundation. She was the chairman of the Finnish Film Directors' Association from 2006 to 2008.

Mäkelä has suffered from cancer three times, most recently from metastases to the liver in 2017.

The Mäkelä family has been active in the film industry since the 1920s. Mäkelä's uncle was film producer Mauno Mäkelä and her grandfather was an influential figure in the Finnish film industry, Väinö Mäkelä. Her cousin Jukka Mäkelä was one of the founders of Finnkino. The documentary Saalis (2007), directed and written by Taru Mäkelä, tells the story of her family. In 2005, Mäkelä and her husband, film director Jouko Seppälä, founded the film production company Kinosto, which was also the name of her grandfather's company.

== Selected filmography as a director ==
- Lotat (1995)
- Pikkusisar (1999)
- Varasto (2011)
- August Fools (2013)
- Varasto 2 (2018)
- Täydellinen joulu (2019)
- Jingle Bells (2022)
