= Anu Palevaara =

Finnish actress, dancer and choreographer

Anu Irmeli Palevaara
- Born: 14 August 1971 (age 53); Helsinki, Finland
- Occupation(s): Actress, choreographer, dancer

Anu Irmeli Palevaara (born 14 August 1971 in Helsinki) is a Finnish actress, choreographer and dancer. She is best known for her role as Jenni Vainio in the Finnish soap opera Salatut elämät which airs on MTV3. Palevaara has been with the series from the beginning, but in year 2001 she had a child and left for maternity leave. Palevaara's pregnancy was written in the series so that her character Jenni had a child. Palevaara returned to the series after her maternity leave. Palevaara's character Jenni was killed off in 2013.

Anu Palevaara studied dance, drama and singing in the Laine Theatre Arts - music theater school in England 1990–1994. Palevaara has made choreographies for the municipal theatre of Lahti and to Hot Club Company, to name a few. She also starred as the leading woman in the successful Finnish film Kuningasjätkä (1998) directed by Markku Pölönen as well as in the TV series Iskelmäprinssi. In 1998, she hosted Tangomarkkinat with Heikki Hietamies.

== Filmography ==
Film
Year	Title	Role	Notes
1998	A Summer by the River	Hilkka Mäkelä	Finnish: Kuningasjätkä
1998	Johtaja Uuno Turhapuro - pisnismies	Roosa	Also as choreographer and performer: "Soitto soi" and "Tytön sietää tietää"
2017	Rendel	Whore	
2020	Working My Ass Off	Helka	Short film
2020	Päätös n:o 30001	N/A	Short film

Television
Year	Title	Role	Notes
1996	Eurovision laulukilpailu 1996 – Suomen karsinta	—	Credited as choreographer; Television special
1996	Herkku & Partanen	Herself	Dancer; Episode: "Unelma"
1997	Ihan auki Eurooppaan	Various roles	Television film
1998– 1999	Iskelmäprinssi	Anita	
1998	Torvensoittaja katolla revyy	Various roles	Television film
1998	Tangomarkkinat	Herself	Host; 2 episodes
1999	Johtaja Uuno Turhapuro, pisnismies	Roosa	3 episodes
1999–2001, 2002–2011, 2012–2013	Salatut elämät	Jenni Vainio	1271 episodes
2006	Seppo Goes Shakespeare	Jenni Vainio	Television film
2009	Salatut elämät 10 v.	Jenni Vainio	Television special
2010	Lillukanvarsia	Jenni Vainio	Video
2018	Pihlajasatu	Jenni Vainio	4 episodes
2019	Justimus esittää: Duo	Maritan äiti	Episode: "Treffit"
