= Helena Vierikko =

Finnish actress

- Born: 11 August 1980 (age 46); Vantaa, Finland
- Occupation: Actress
- Father: Vesa Vierikko

Helena Vierikko (born 11 August 1980 in Vantaa), is a Finnish actress.

She starred in the 2005 film Kaksipäisen kotkan varjossa working with actors such as Mikko Leppilampi and Vesa-Matti-Loiri and director Timo Koivusalo.

Her father is actor Vesa Vierikko.

== Filmography ==
- Kaksipäisen kotkan varjossa (2005)
- Toinen jalka haudasta (2009)
- Luokkakokous (2015)
- Luokkakokous 2 – Polttarit (2016)
