= Esko Salminen =

Finnish actor (born 1940)

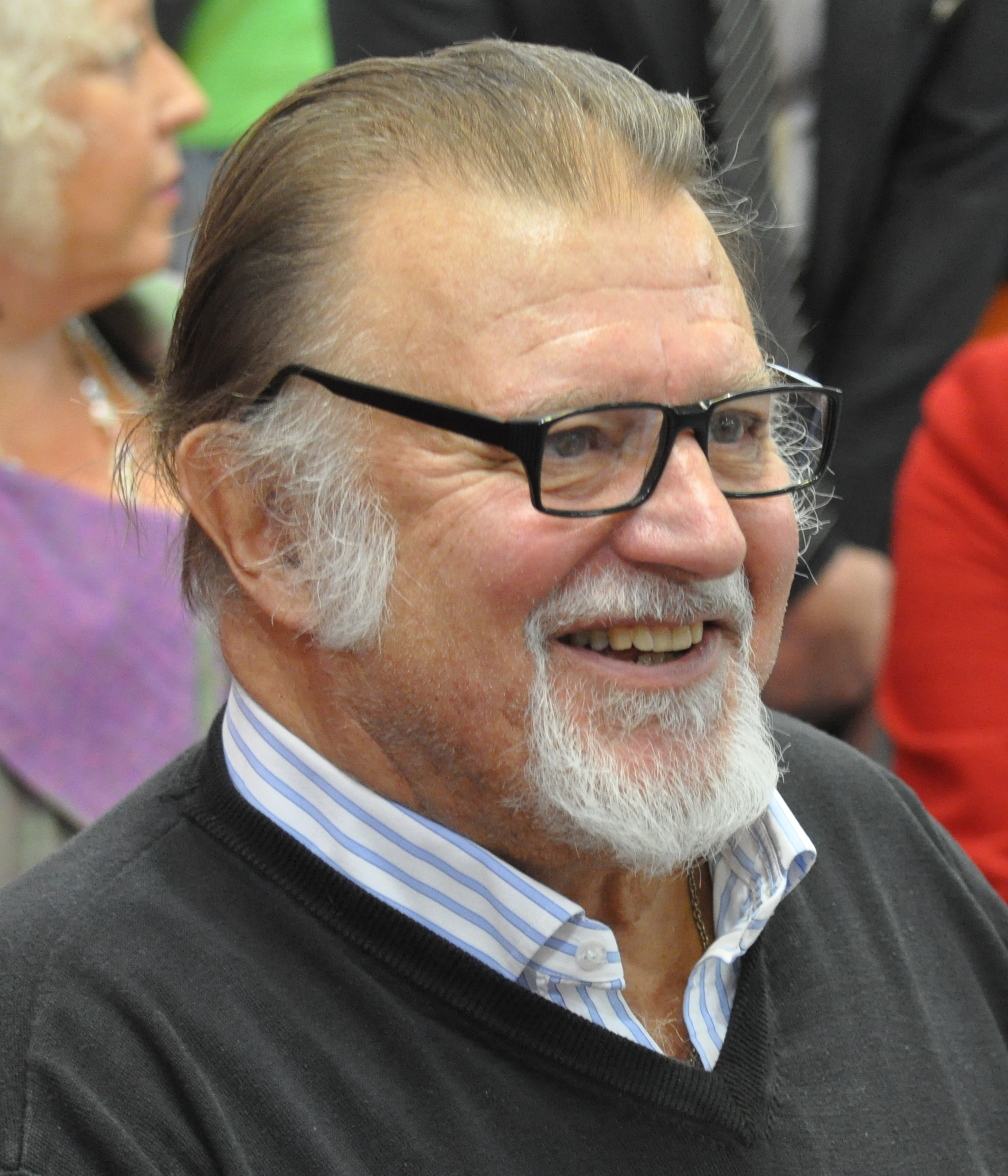
- Born: 12 October 1940 (age 85); Helsinki, Finland
- Occupation: Actor

Esko Salminen (born 12 October 1940) is a Finnish actor with careers on television, the stage and on the silver screen.

== Personal life ==
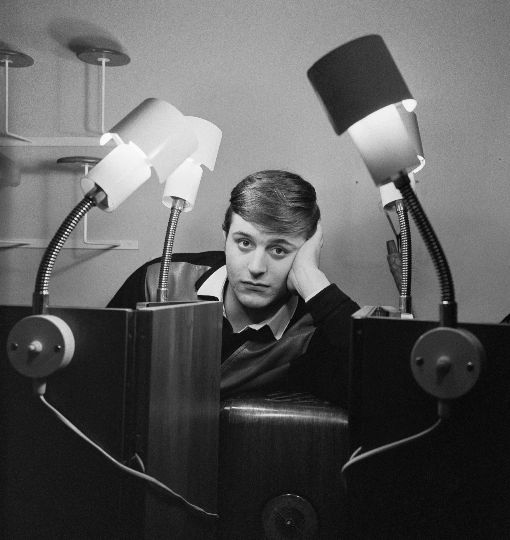
Esko Salminen in 1963

Born in Helsinki, Salminen's parents were actor Unto Salminen and actress Kyllikki Väre. He is of partial Russian descent through his biological father, actor and singer Tauno Palo, whose maternal grandfather was a Russian soldier. Actors Jukka-Pekka Palo, Martti Palo and Pertti Palo are his half-brothers.

Salminen has been married to actress Rose-Marie Precht, dancer Riikka Korppi-Tommola and, since 1989, to actress Aino Seppo. He has two children with actress Heidi Krohn, one of whom is actor Kristo Salminen. Actresses Sonja Salminen and Kreeta Salminen are also Salminen's children.

== Selected filmography ==
- The Dissidents (2017)
- August Fools (2013)
- Härmä (2012)
- The Storage (2011)
- Unna ja Nuuk (2006)
- Mother of Mine (2005)
- Aapo (1994)
- The Last Border (1993)
- Hamlet Goes Business (1987)
- Sign of the Beast (1981)
- Flame Top (1980)
- Poet and Muse (1978)
- Speedy Gonzales - noin 7 veljeksen poika (English title Speedy Gonzales - The Son of About Seven Brothers) (1970)
- Nutty Finland (1967)
