= Lipton Cockton in the Shadows of Sodoma =

- Film poster
- Directed by: Jari Halonen
- Written by: Jari Halonen
- Produced by: Heikki Ahonius
- Starring: Jorma Tommila; Tarja-Tuulikki Tarsala; Hannu Huuska; Outi Mäenpää
- Cinematography: Timo Heinänen
- Edited by: Jukka Uusitalo; Ilmari Hakala
- Music by: Tuomas Kantelinen
- Production companies: Mondo Furioso Filmproductions; Zentropa Entertainments
- Release date: 21 April 1995 (Finland)
- Running time: 83 minutes
- Country: Finland
- Languages: Finnish, English
- Budget: FIM 2.9 million

Lipton Cockton in the Shadows of Sodoma (or simply Lipton Cockton) is a 1995 Finnish dystopian crime film written and directed by Jari Halonen. It tells the story of a private investigator living in a near-future federal state who begins to investigate unexplained explosion deaths. The film stars Jorma Tommila.

Halonen has said in the 2011 interview that Ridley Scott's Blade Runner, Jean-Luc Godard's Alphaville and Terry Gilliam's Brazil served as inspirations for the film. Halonen has said that he wanted to deal with criticism of individualism and its effect on humanity in the theme of film.

During the production process, the creators aimed at foreign markets, but the success both at the domestic box office and in foreign sales remained modest. Instead, the film toured many festivals, such as at the 1995 Fantasy Filmfest in Berlin. Jukka Uusitalo, Ilmari Hakala and Jouni Nikkanen won the Jussi Awards for best production design in 1996.

== Plot ==
The year is 2037. The peripheral regions of Europe, united into a giant federal state, have weakened sharply, which has caused huge migrations. The events focus on Vladivostok, the easternmost metropolis of the federal state, in which a person explodes in the Ugrian district. Federal Police Chief Brand Marlon (Jari Halonen) hires private investigator Lipton Cockton (Jorma Tommila) to investigate this terrifying series of serial murders. In connection with the investigation, Cockton befriends a fighting cock destined to be eaten, while at the same time drifting towards experiments organized by a mega-corporation LTD-Productions, experiencing a journey from a decayed social system and a failed human life towards the light of reality, the understanding of which makes the detective reflect on his problematic relationship with his mother (Iris-Lilja Lassila) and his sexual identity, to which the Marilyn Monroe-looking woman Dazzle Dent (Outi Mäenpää) somehow seems to be related.

== Cast ==
- Jorma Tommila as Lipton Cockton / Launo Käkkyrä
- Tarja-Tuulikki Tarsala as She-Detective
- Hannu Huuska as Edgar Hampton
- Outi Mäenpää as Dazzle Dent
- Rauno Juvonen as prostitute
- Iris-Lilja Lassila as Lipton Cockton's mother
- Jari Halonen as Brand Marlon
- Riitta Pasanen as Eartha
- Pentti Korhonen as George the bartender
- Abdeslam Chellaf as Kent Lumumba

== Reception ==
Helena Ylänen from Helsingin Sanomat said in her review that "Halonen's visions are an interesting combination of theatricality and modern action cinema", adding that "the expression is very full; there is a lot of stuff in the images, there are layers in the sound." Paavo Ihalainen from Elitisti praises "Halonen's ingenuity to create a powerful visual environment with little money thanks to his theater experience."

== See also ==
- List of dystopian films
- List of Finnish films of the 1990s
