= One Foot Under =

- Directed by: Johanna Vuoksenmaa
- Written by: Mika Ripatti, Seppo Vesiluoma
- Produced by: Dionysos Films
- Starring: Tobias Zilliacus; Helena Vierikko; Susanna Mikkonen; Jarkko Pajunen; Tuomas Rinta-Panttila; Jarkko Niemi
- Edited by: Kimmo Kohtamäki
- Music by: Kerkko Koskinen
- Distributed by: Sandrew Metronome Distribution Finland
- Release date: March 2009
- Country: Finland
- Language: Finnish
- Budget: 1,110,019 €

One Foot Under (Finnish: Toinen jalka haudasta) is a 2009 Finnish film produced by Dionysos Films and directed by Johanna Vuoksenmaa.

== Plot ==
Visa Vuorio (Tobias Zilliacus), a 35-year-old team leader at the Helsinki city gardening department, is suffering from a terminal neurological disease and only has a few months to live. Because of this, he is a member of a therapeutical support group for people suffering from terminal diseases. Visa's life changes when a young female reporter, Hanna Manninen (Helena Vierikko), arrives at the support group offering to write a series of articles about Visa's life story.

While visiting the doctor, Visa hears there's been a mix-up of samples, and he is in fact perfectly healthy. However, he does not want to tell this to either Hanna or his girlfriend Riia (Susanna Mikkonen), as he wants to avoid shocking them, and doesn't want to lose the experience of having an article series written about him. He only confides in his best friend Harri (Jarkko Pajunen), who unknown to him is in love with Riia.

Visa and Hanna travel to Copenhagen together, and they fall in love with each other there, but don't dare to confess it to each other yet. Back in Helsinki, the support group organises a great party, where Visa is invited as a speaker. On stage, he admits being perfectly healthy and confesses his love to Hanna. However, Hanna is shocked by this, and turns him down. Instead, Hanna's ex-boyfriend Ilkka seeks a new relationship with her, and proposes to her in a restaurant in Porvoo. Visa takes desperate measures to stop this, but at the restaurant door, he realises he is in fact sick after all, and passes out on the street.

Visa is taken to a hospital in Helsinki, but he takes the first chance to escape and crash Hanna's and Ilkka's wedding to admit to being sick after all and confess his love to Hanna. He kisses Hanna, and almost immediately, falls dead on the ground.
