= Ilppo Pohjola =

Finnish filmmaker

- Born: 30 January 1957 (age 69); Keuruu, Finland
- Education: American Film Institute, Sheridan College, Harrow College
- Known for: Experimental Film, Video Art, Installation Art
- Website: http://ilppopohjola.com/

Ilppo Anssi Pohjola (born 30 January 1957 in Keuruu) is an independent filmmaker, producer and artist based in Helsinki, Finland. His international breakthrough was Daddy and the Muscle Academy (1991), a documentary about Tom of Finland. Pohjola has produced the cinematic installations and films by Eija-Liisa Ahtila since 1993.

Ilppo Pohjola works with the vocabulary of film, examining its structural and social elements in order to create a body of work that pushes the limits of the medium's physical possibilities. He works between the narrative tropes of Hollywood and the deconstructive methodologies of independent film. The cumulative bodies of knowledge in Pohjola's works are noticeable for their crispness of conception and excess of information. Given his interest in the formal elements of filmmaking, the content of Pohjola's works are surprisingly physical and sensual, even if assaultive. His film Daddy and the Muscle Academy won the Jussi Award for the best documentary film in Finland, 1991.

== Biography ==
Ilppo Pohjola studied at the American Film Institute in Los Angeles, USA and at Sheridan College in Toronto, Canada. He graduated from Harrow College of Higher Education in London, UK in 1988. He achieved international breakthrough with his first cinema feature, the 1991 documentary Daddy and the Muscle Academy, featuring artist and gay culture icon Tom of Finland. The film received several awards including the Jussi Award (the "Finnish Oscar") for the best documentary film. In subsequent works Pohjola 'proved himself to be one of the most extraordinary avant-garde filmmakers of his day'.

Pohjola's second film, P(l)ain Truth (1993), also a documentary but of a more poetic and metaphorical kind, is about a transgender person undergoing a sex reassignment operation. Asphalto (1998), starring Irina Björklund and Peter Franzén, bridges the artist's interest in gender stereotypes and the erotics of the auto by shuffling footage of demolition derby, clips of pinup models in latex shorts bearing oil company logos, and moments with a young couple in relationship distress.

The following film, Routemaster (1999) continues the exploration of the limits of classical film narrative by focusing on filmic movement in tandem with the speed of racing cars. Drawing from the tradition of structural film and the principles of minimalist art, Routemaster uses repetition and rapid, complex editing to disrupt the flow of linear time and strict spatial continuity. Routemaster was also presented as a multichannel installation in three different versions with live sound by Merzbow and sound designer Jim McKee.

His latest work to date, 1 plus 1 plus 1 – Sympathy for the Decay (2012) has been described as a "death triptych", combining themes and techniques used in his previous works to achieve a gesamtkunstwerk.

A recurring theme running through all of Pohjola's work is transformation – how a person can change from one gender to another (P(l)ain Truth), how flesh and steel can fuse in an apotheosis called the crash (Routemaster), what time and chemicals do to film images (1 Plus 1 Plus 1 – Sympathy for the Decay). What all these films have in common is their intoxicating imagery. Little that cinema has brought forth in the past quarter century leaves the viewer as ecstatic, agitated and euphoric as the films of Pohjola.

In addition to directing and scriptwriting, Pohjola works as a producer and has through his company Crystal Eye produced Eija-Liisa Ahtila's films and cinematic installations. He has directed several television documentaries and videos. Pohjola is also known as a photographer and a graphic artist.

== Filmography ==
=== Director ===
- Daddy and the Muscle Academy (1991)
- P(l)ain Truth (1993)
- Asphalto (1998)
- Routemaster (1999)
- 1 plus 1 plus 1 – Sympathy for the Decay (2012)

=== Producer ===
- P(l)ain Truth (1993)
- Asphalto (1998)
- Routemaster (1999)
- 1 plus 1 plus 1 – Sympathy for the Decay (2012)

Works written and directed by Eija-Liisa Ahtila:

- Me/We, Okay, Grey (1993)
- If 6 was 9 (1995)
- Today (1996)
- Aki, Anne and God (1998)
- Consolation Service (1999)
- The Present (2001)
- The Wind (2002)
- The House (2002)
- Love is a Treasure (2002)
- The Hour of Prayer (2005)
- Fishermen (2007)
- Where is Where? (2008)
- The Annunciation (2010)
- Horizontal (2011)
- Studies on the Ecology of Drama (2014)

Other:

- After Everything (2014), written and directed by Pekka Sassi

== Awards ==
1992

- Finnish State Award for Documentary, National Council for Audiovisual Arts, Helsinki, Finland (work: Daddy and the Muscle Academy)
- Finnish State Award for Directing, National Council for Audiovisual Arts, Helsinki, Finland (work: Daddy and the Muscle Academy)
- Quality Production Award, National Council for Audiovisual Arts, Helsinki, Finland (work: Daddy and the Muscle Academy)
- Tupilak Award, Stockholm, Sweden (work: Daddy and the Muscle Academy)
- Jussi Award for Best Documentary, Helsinki, Finland (work: Daddy and the Muscle Academy)

1993

- Teddy Bear for the Best Short Film, Berlin International Film Festival, Germany (work: P(l)ain Truth)
- Main Prize in the National Competition, Tampere Film Festival, Finland (work: P(l)ain Truth)
- Special Prize of the Jury in the International Competition, Tampere Film Festival, Finland (work: P(l)ain Truth)
- Audience Prize in the National Competition, Tampere Film Festival, Finland (work: P(l)ain Truth)
- Audience Prize in the International Competition, Tampere Film Festival, Finland (work: P(l)ain Truth)
- Seta Apple Award, Helsinki, Finland (work: P(l)ain Truth)
- Quality Production Award, National Council for Audiovisual Arts, Helsinki, Finland (work: P(l)ain Truth)
- Award for Best Experimental Film, Uppsala International Film Festival, Sweden (work: P(l)ain Truth)
- Award for Best Short Film, Kettupäivät, Helsinki, Finland (work: P(l)ain Truth)
- Public Award for Best Documentary Film, Turin Gay & Lesbian Film Festival, Italy (work: P(l)ain Truth)
- Special Commendation, Prix Futura Berlin, Germany (work: Daddy and the Muscle Academy)
- Award for Delivering New Information, National Council for Audiovisual Arts, Helsinki, Finland

1994

- Public Award for Best Documentary Film, Turin Gay & Lesbian Film Festival, Italy (work: P(l)ain Truth)

1999

- Special Prize of the Jury in the National Competition, Tampere Film Festival, Finland (work: Asphalto)
- Quality Production Award, National Council for Audiovisual Arts, Helsinki, Finland (work: Asphalto)

2000

- Audience Award, Kettupäivät, Helsinki, Finland (work: Routemaster)
- Quality Production Award, National Council for Audiovisual Arts, Helsinki, Finland (work: Routemaster)
