= Pater Noster (film) =

- Film poster
- Directed by: Veikko Aaltonen
- Written by: Veikko Aaltonen
- Starring: Hannu Kivioja; Martti Katajisto; Elina Hurme
- Cinematography: Olavi Tuomi
- Edited by: Veikko Aaltonen
- Music by: Mauri Sumén
- Production company: Villealfa Filmproductions
- Release date: 22 October 1993
- Running time: 88 minutes
- Country: Finland
- Language: Finnish

Pater Noster (also known as Our Father...; Finnish: Isä meidän) is a 1993 Finnish black-and-white drama film written and directed by Veikko Aaltonen. It tells the story of a young man returning to his childhood home, who decides to face painful memories related to his formerly abusive but today demented father. The film stars Hannu Kivioja, Martti Katajisto and Elina Hurme.

In 1994, the film received three Jussi Awards: Hannu Kivioja for best actor, Veikko Aaltonen for best director and Olavi Tuomi for best cinematography. In the same year, Aaltonen won the FIPRESCI Prize at the Stockholm International Film Festival and the Young Audience Awards at the Rouen Nordic Film Festival with his film. The film has also been shown at the Berlin International Film Festival.

== Plot ==
Juhani (Hannu Kivioja) returns to his childhood home in the countryside after spending several years at sea. He warms up the cold house under whose roof his childhood memories come alive. Because of this, Juhani decides to picks up his demented, wheelchair-using father (Martti Katajisto) from the nursing home and starts living with him. However, Juhani's childhood memories, presented in fragments, torment him, and it gradually becomes clear that his father once sexually abused him. Juhani has to go through many different emotional states to try to find out if he ever can forgive his father for what he has done to him, and if he can ever leave his painful past behind.

== Cast ==
- Hannu Kivioja as Juhani Haavisto
  - Antti Mattila as young Juhani
- Martti Katajisto as Eino Haavisto
  - Matti Onnismaa as young Eino
- Elina Hurme as Marja Rantanen
- Heikki Kujanpää as Aarne Armas 'Arska' Rantanen
- Aino Aaltonen as Aino Rantanen
- Kosti Klemelä as old man
- Vieno Saaristo as school teacher
- Elli Castrén as nurse
