= Daddy and the Muscle Academy =

1991 film directed by Ilppo Pohjola

- U.S. theatrical release poster
- Directed by: Ilppo Pohjola
- Written by: Ilppo Pohjola
- Produced by: Kari Paljakka; Alvaro Pardo
- Cinematography: Kjell Lagerroos
- Edited by: Jorma Höri
- Music by: Elliott Sharp
- Production companies: Filmitakomo; Yleisradio
- Distributed by: Kristallisilmä
- Release date: 18 October 1991
- Running time: 58 minutes
- Country: Finland
- Languages: Finnish, English

Daddy and the Muscle Academy is a 1991 Finnish documentary film directed and written by Ilppo Pohjola. The documentary is focused on the life and works of Tom of Finland, the pseudonym of Finnish gay erotic artist Touko Laaksonen.

== Synopsis ==
Daddy and the Muscle Academy focuses on the life and artwork of Tom of Finland, the pseudonym of artist Touko Laaksonen, whose homoerotic illustrations of masculine men produced in the mid 20th century significantly influenced gay culture. The documentary was produced in the years immediately preceding Laaksonen's death in 1991, and features interviews with the artist as well as a retrospective of his illustrations. Individuals who have been influenced by Laaksonen's artwork, notably Etienne, Nayland Blake, Durk Dehner, and Bob Mizer, also appear as interview subjects.

== Production and release ==
Daddy and the Muscle Academy was written and directed by Ilppo Pohjola, produced by Kari Paljakka and Alvaro Pardo, shot by Kjell Lagerroos, and edited by Jorma Höri. The film was produced by Filmitakomo and Yleisradio, and distributed by Kristallisilmä. The film's soundtrack was produced by composer Elliott Sharp; Sharp remarked that Pohjola gave him "a few vague guidelines and suggestions" but left him "great latitude" to compose the soundtrack, which consisted primarily of electronically processed guitar.

The film premiered in 1991 at the Helsinki International Film Festival. It has been broadcast multiple times on Finnish television, most recently in 2019 on Yle Teema & Fem, with censorship cuts of circa three minutes. The film was restored in 2017 and released, with unedited interview segments, by Kino Lorber on Blu-ray.

== Reception ==
Writing for The Spool, critic B. L. Panther cites Daddy and the Muscle Academy as an example of New Queer Cinema through its "provocative secular-sexual imagery", non-linear narrative, and celebration of "a queer culture with a history", writing that the film gives a "clear sense of how gay men would use, send, lend, and share these magazines to see gay male erotica, which, in a profound way, made them feel seen themselves".

At the Jussi Awards in 1992, the crew of Daddy and the Muscle Academy was awarded a Special Award.
