= Back to the USSR =

- Original Finnish film poster
- Finnish: Takaisin Ryssiin
- Directed by: Jari Halonen
- Written by: Jari Halonen; Jorma Tommila
- Based on: Vampyyri eli miten Wilhelm Kojac kuoli kovat kaulassa by Jarkko Laine
- Produced by: Jari Halonen
- Starring: Jorma Tommila; Taisto Reimaluoto
- Production company: Mondo Furioso Filmproductions
- Release date: 27 March 1992 (Finland)
- Running time: 94 minutes
- Country: Finland
- Language: Finnish
- Budget: FIM 900,000

Back to the USSR (Finnish: Takaisin Ryssiin) is a 1992 Finnish comedy drama film directed by Jari Halonen and co-written with Jorma Tommila. It is an absurd comedy about Finland's last communist (played by Tommila) and his friendship with a vampire (played by Taisto Reimaluoto) who looks like Vladimir Lenin. The film is loosely based on the 1971 novel Vampyyri eli miten Wilhelm Kojac kuoli kovat kaulassa by Jarkko Laine.

== Plot ==
Reima Elo, the last local communist with a reputation as a village madman, lives in a constant cycle of failure. One evening, when Reima is about to commit suicide by hanging, a man resembling Lenin, who introduces himself as Vladimir, arrives at his house as a tenant. The guest has only a coffin with him as luggage. Reima begins to believe that his guest is indeed Vladimir Lenin who has come back, but in the form of a vampire. This gives Reima a new lease of life and he decides to join Vladimir in a desperate fight against capitalism to spread the glory of communism.

== Cast ==
- Jorma Tommila as Reima Elo
- Taisto Reimaluoto as Vladimir
- Rose-Marie Precht as Matsonska, pharmaceutist's wife
- Jouko Turkka as Topi Rautavaara
- Ulla Koivuranta as Molla Elo
- Tarja-Tuulikki Tarsala as widow
- Kati Köngäs as religious girl
- Jari Halonen as pharmaceutist Rauno Matson

== Reception ==
The film received a mixed reception from critics. Helena Ylänen from Helsingin Sanomat describes in her review Back to the USSR as "an amazing Finnish film," continuing that "even if the film's mishmash threatens to turn into a farce only for a few moments, the film deals with big and serious issues in an animated and heartfelt way." Olli Manninen from Iltalehti criticized the film, saying that "Back to the USSR is like a joke of a few sketches, the stretching of which into a feature film shows a shocking underestimation of the audience." Hannu Massinen from Etelä-Suomen Sanomat thinks the film is "pointless", saying "the work is full of rubbish, which may fortunately make it a welcome target for so-called trash film worshippers."

Kimmo Ahonen from Film-O-Holic gives the film a full five stars, saying in his review that "the film's farce and tragedy meet in it with a naturalness and an attitude whose uncompromisingness is still admirable and inspiring." In his review, Ahonen also praises the acting of Reimaluoto and Tommila.
