= The Storage =

2011 film

- Film poster
- Directed by: Taru Mäkelä
- Written by: Veli-Pekka Hänninen; Arto Salminen
- Produced by: Markku Tuurna
- Starring: Kari-Pekka Toivonen
- Cinematography: Jouko Seppälä
- Release date: 30 December 2011
- Running time: 90 minutes
- Country: Finland
- Language: Finnish

The Storage (Finnish: Varasto) is a 2011 Finnish comedy film directed by Taru Mäkelä and based on the novel Varasto by Arto Salminen.

== Plot ==
The central character of the film is Antero Rousku, a warehouse worker at a hardware store. Dissatisfied with his warehouse worker's wages, he regularly sells his employer's goods under the table to a frequent customer, Jylhäkorpi, for lower prices.

Antero's romantic interest is the brunette Karita. Their passionate relationship cools down after Karita becomes pregnant without consulting Antero, which Antero learns when Karita invites him to a Chinese restaurant.

Antero buys birth-control pills and tries to sneak them into Karita's yogurt. His scheme fails when the store manager steals and eats the yogurt, later vomiting, much to the amusement of Karita.

Antero is forced to move in with Karita after she threatens to expose his shady dealing, after spying on Antero assisting Jylhäkorpi to take hardware away. Meanwhile, his employer begins to notice the missing inventory. Antero and his employer agree to put the blame on Raninen, Antero's coworker. Raninen is fired and replaced by another worker, and Antero is promoted to warehouse manager.

Karita gives birth to a daughter. Despite Karita’s lies and blackmail, their relationship endures; a couple of years after their daughter is born, they are still together and planning to marry.

Raninen, who has hit rock bottom, does not hold a grudge against Antero. Eventually, he turns his life around and wins the lottery.

== Cast ==
- Kari-Pekka Toivonen as Antero Rousku
- Minttu Mustakallio as Karita
- Aku Hirviniemi as Raninen
- Esko Salminen as Kataja
- Juha Muje as Store manager
- Tomi Lauri as Rofa
- Vesa Vierikko as Jylhäkorpi
- Hannele Lauri as Aino
- Vesa-Matti Loiri as Mynttinen
- Jope Ruonansuu as Ykä
