= Aatamin poika =

- Written by: Heikki Veijola
- Directed by: Heikki Veijola
- Starring: Meri Nenonen; Ari-Kyösti Seppo; Risto Kaskilahti; Kai Lehtinen
- Music by: Tapio Wiik
- Country of origin: Finland
- Original language: Finnish

Production
- Producers: Erkki Perkiömäki; Olli Tola
- Cinematography: Ville Grönroos
- Editor: Lauri Vänskä

Original release
- Release: 21 April 1996

Aatamin poika is a 1996 Finnish TV film drama lasting 45 minutes. The TV short film was directed and written by Heikki Veijola starring Meri Nenonen. It aired on the 21 April 1996 on Yle TV2.

== Cast ==
- Meri Nenonen .... Mari Nuotio
- Ari-Kyösti Seppo .... Jyrki Alinen
- Risto Kaskilahti .... Timonen
- Kai Lehtinen .... Väinö Alinen
- Pertti Sveholm .... Mäkelä
- Martti Katajisto .... Kauppias
