= Shear Fear =

- Original Finnish film poster
- Finnish: Kauhun millimetrit
- Directed by: Ilari Nummi
- Written by: Markus Nummi
- Produced by: Markus Nummi; Pirkko Peltola; Tapio Bergholm
- Starring: Tiina Tenhunen; Katja Krohn; Tarja-Tuulikki Tarsala
- Cinematography: Antti Hellstedt
- Edited by: Rauno Ronkainen
- Music by: More Karvonen
- Production company: Heimola-Filmi ry
- Distributed by: Cinema Mondo
- Release date: 6 March 1992
- Running time: 61 min
- Country: Finland
- Language: Finnish

Shear Fear (Finnish: Kauhun millimetrit; literally translated "The Millimetres of Horror") is a 1992 Finnish horror film directed by Ilari Nummi. The film set in the city center of Helsinki in the late 1980s summer, where everything starts from the small fears of everyday life, moving straight towards an area distorted by the terror. The film's actors include Tiina Tenhunen and Katja Krohn.

The film was screened at the Espoo Ciné International Film Festival in 1992 and at the Tampere Film Festival in 1993.

== Premise ==
Marja Sauri, who lives in Helsinki at the end of the 1980s, is going to the store to replace defective garden shears with new ones. Along the way, she collides with a woman on the street who Marja insults in anger. Within a day, Marja begins to see strange delusions about the same woman she encountered earlier.

== Cast ==
- Tiina Tenhunen as Marja Sauri
- Katja Krohn as a woman
- Tarja-Tuulikki Tarsala as Marja's mother
- Markku Huhtamo as hardware store seller
- Matti Onnismaa as staff manager
- Hannu Kivioja as Mikko
- Leea Klemola as Leena Lindholm

== Reception ==
The film received favorable reviews when it was released. In March 1992, Tarmo Poussu evaluated the film in Ilta-Sanomat, praising the film: "The film deftly picks up the anxieties of everyday life in its story and Katja Krohn very effectively outlines her wordless role as a hostile woman." However, Poussu also found flaws in the film: “Still, Shear Fear remain just an exercise. Its realistic and fantastic ingredients don’t always articulate.”

In the opinion of Pertti Avola of Helsingin Sanomat, the film was “a controlled and safe job in all respects. It lives and breathes perfectly and retains its atmosphere well. Shear Fear aren't dug very deep into the subject or the people, but it might have shattered the film too much.”
