= Aapo (film) =

- Directed by: Tero Jartti
- Written by: Jari Hietanen; Tero Jartti; Runar Schildt
- Produced by: Klaus Heydemann; Tero Kaukomaa
- Starring: Taisto Reimaluoto; Esko Salminen; Ulla Koivuranta; Kai Lehtinen
- Cinematography: Tuomo Virtanen
- Edited by: Jukka Nykänen
- Music by: Jaakko Erkkilä; Pekka Karjalainen
- Release date: 29 July 1994
- Running time: 55 minutes
- Country: Finland
- Language: Finnish

Aapo was a 1994 Finnish film directed by Tero Jartti and based on a short story by Runar Schildt. The screenplay was written by Jari Hietanen. The film was set in the year 1918. Taisto Reimaluoto portrayed Aapo.

== Cast ==
- Taisto Reimaluoto .... Aapo
- Esko Salminen .... Kertoja (voice)
- Ulla Koivuranta .... Lempi
- Kai Lehtinen .... Volanen
- Martti Suosalo .... Räsänen
- Esko Nikkari .... Maanviljelysneuvos
- Merja Larivaara .... Maanviljelysneuvoksetar
- Jouni Salo .... Puutarhuri
- Paavo Liski .... Pehtori
- Juha Lampinen .... Magnus
- Johanna Piiroinen .... Magnuksen sisko
- Linda Haakana .... Magnuksen sisko
- Martti Jantunen .... Valkkalan renki
