= Ripa Hits the Skids =

1993 film

- Original Finnish film poster
- Directed by: Christian Lindblad
- Written by: Christian Lindblad
- Starring: Sam Huber
- Cinematography: Ilkka Ruuhijärvi
- Release date: 5 February 1993
- Running time: 80 minutes
- Country: Finland
- Language: Finnish

Ripa Hits the Skids (Finnish: Ripa ruostuu) is a 1993 Finnish comedy film directed by Christian Lindblad.

The film was entered into the 18th Moscow International Film Festival. It was selected as the Finnish entry for the Best Foreign Language Film at the 66th Academy Awards, but was not accepted as a nominee.

== Plot ==
It tells the story of Ripa, a young film director whose life seems to be going downhill all the time. Ripa, in debt and alcoholic, meets a beautiful young woman, Tiina, with whom he starts dating, but the relationship is full of problems, and the lenders and the police chasing him do not exactly make the difficult everyday life any easier.

== Cast ==
- Sam Huber as Ripa
- Mari Vainio as Tiina
- Merja Larivaara as Pirjo
- Leena Uotila as Irma
- Leo Raivio as Antti
- Kari Väänänen as Lynkkynen
- Jussi Lampi as Lindgren
- Vesa-Matti Loiri as Father
- Christian Lindblad as Keränen
- Minna Pirilä as Beauty
- Jukka Pitkänen as Jaatinen

== See also ==
- List of submissions to the 66th Academy Awards for Best Foreign Language Film
- List of Finnish submissions for the Academy Award for Best Foreign Language Film
