= Jari Halonen =

Finnish director and actor

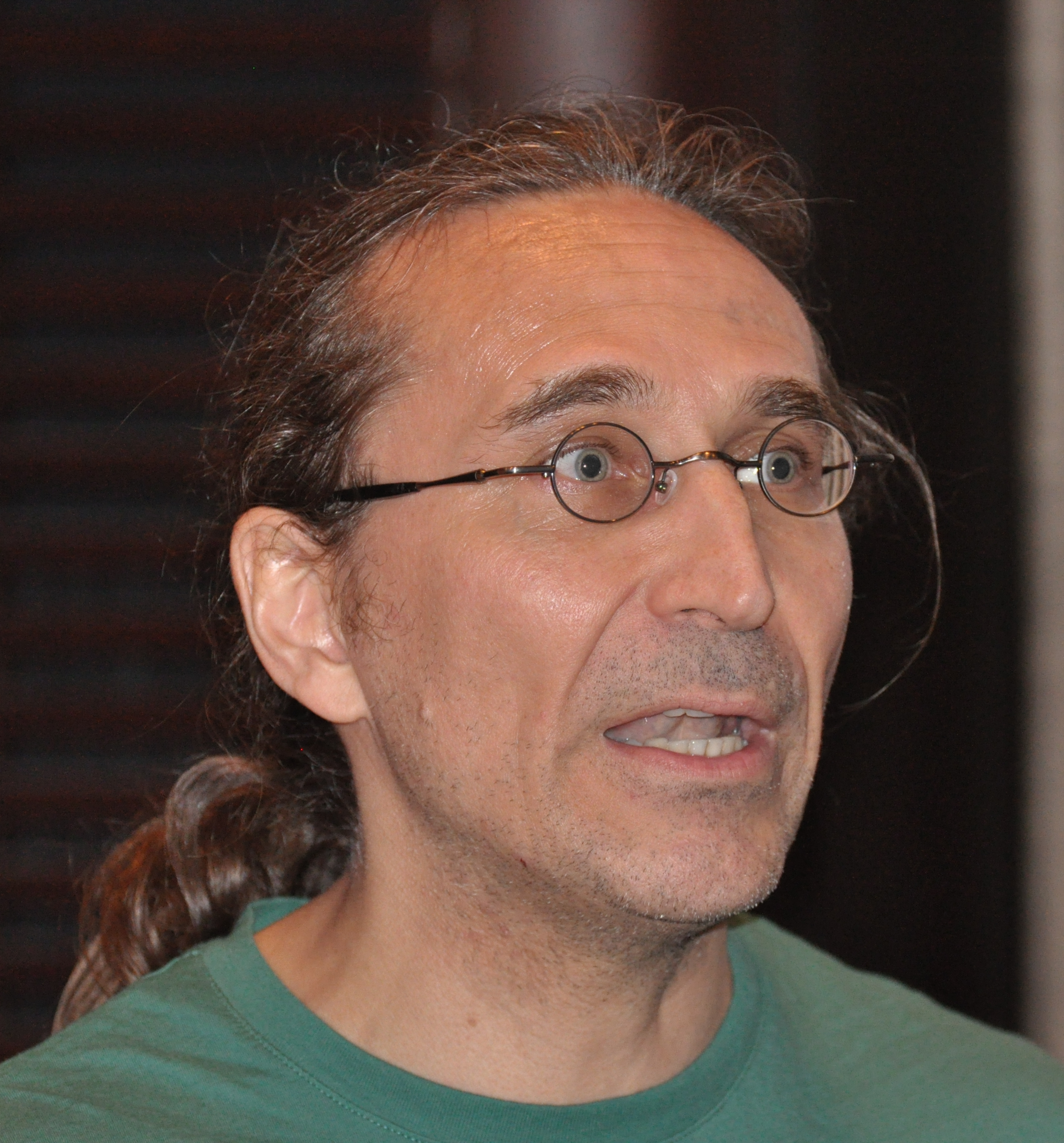
Halonen in 2011

Jari Juhani Halonen (born 30 September 1962) is a Finnish film and theatre director, writer and occasional actor. Known as a controversial and outspoken person, his films, such as Back to the USSR (1992), Lipton Cockton in the Shadows of Sodoma (1995) and The Christmas Party (1996), have garnered a cult following while also having been met with mixed reception by critics.

== Selected filmography ==
=== As a director ===
- Huolehtivainen rakastaja (1990)
- Back to the USSR – takaisin Ryssiin (1992)
- Lipton Cockton in the Shadows of Sodoma (1995)
- Joulubileet (1996)
- Aleksis Kiven elämä (2002)
- Kalevala – Uusi aika (2013)

=== As an actor ===
- Vares – yksityisetsivä (2004)

== See also ==
- Jumalan teatteri
