= Ilkka Järvi-Laturi =

Finnish film director (1961–2023)

- Born: 28 November 1961; Valkeakoski, Finland
- Died: 5 March 2023 (aged 61); Padasjoki, Finland
- Occupation: Film director

Ilkka Untamo Järvi-Laturi (28 November 1961 – 5 March 2023) was a Finnish-born US-based film director whose best known film was Spy Games (1999) starring Bill Pullman and Irene Jacob. The film was shot in Helsinki, New York and Toronto. Järvi-Laturi had a cameo role in the film.

== Career ==
Before making the film Spy Games, Järvi-Laturi directed and served as co-director of several films in Finland. He has also acted in the 1985 film The Unknown Soldier.

Järvi-Laturi won the Nordic Film Prize for the best Scandinavian Film of The Year and the highest Finnish film prize Jussi Award (best screenplay) in 1990 for Kotia päin (Homebound). His Estonian actioner Darkness in Tallinn is the most widely distributed Estonian film so far, and won the Silver Alexander in Thessaloniki and the Fassbinder prize in Mannheim.

== Personal Life and Death ==
Järvi-Laturi lived in New York City and Beijing. He died in Padasjoki on 5 March 2023, at the age of 61.

== Filmography ==
=== Directed ===
- 1999: History Is Made at Night
- 1993: Darkness in Tallinn (City Unplugged)
- 1989: Homebound
- 1988: Kaasari (Short)
- 1986: Come with Us (Short)
- 1983: Arsenikkia ja wanhoja peniksiä (Short)

=== Written ===
- 2011: Ensisuukko
- 1993: Darkness in Tallinn (City Unplugged)
- 1989: Kotia päin
- 1988: Kaasari (Short)
- 1988: Nuoruuteni savotat
- 1983: Arsenikkia ja wanhoja peniksiä

=== Acted ===
- 1999: History Is Made at Night: ... Man outside the jazz-bar (uncredited)
- 1989: Talvisota ... Private by the River Bank
- 1988: Nuoruuteni savotat ... Hoikkalan Kalle
- 1985: The Unknown Soldier: ... Young Second Lieutenant
- 1984: Angelan sota ... dying patient
- 1982: Tyly rakkaus (TV Movie) ... Juha

=== Produced ===
- 1993: Darkness in Tallinn (executive producer)
- 1988: Kaasari (Short) (producer)
- 1986: Come with Us (Short) (producer)
- 1983: Arsenikkia ja wanhoja peniksiä (Short) (producer)
