= Martti Suosalo =

Finnish actor and singer (born 1962)

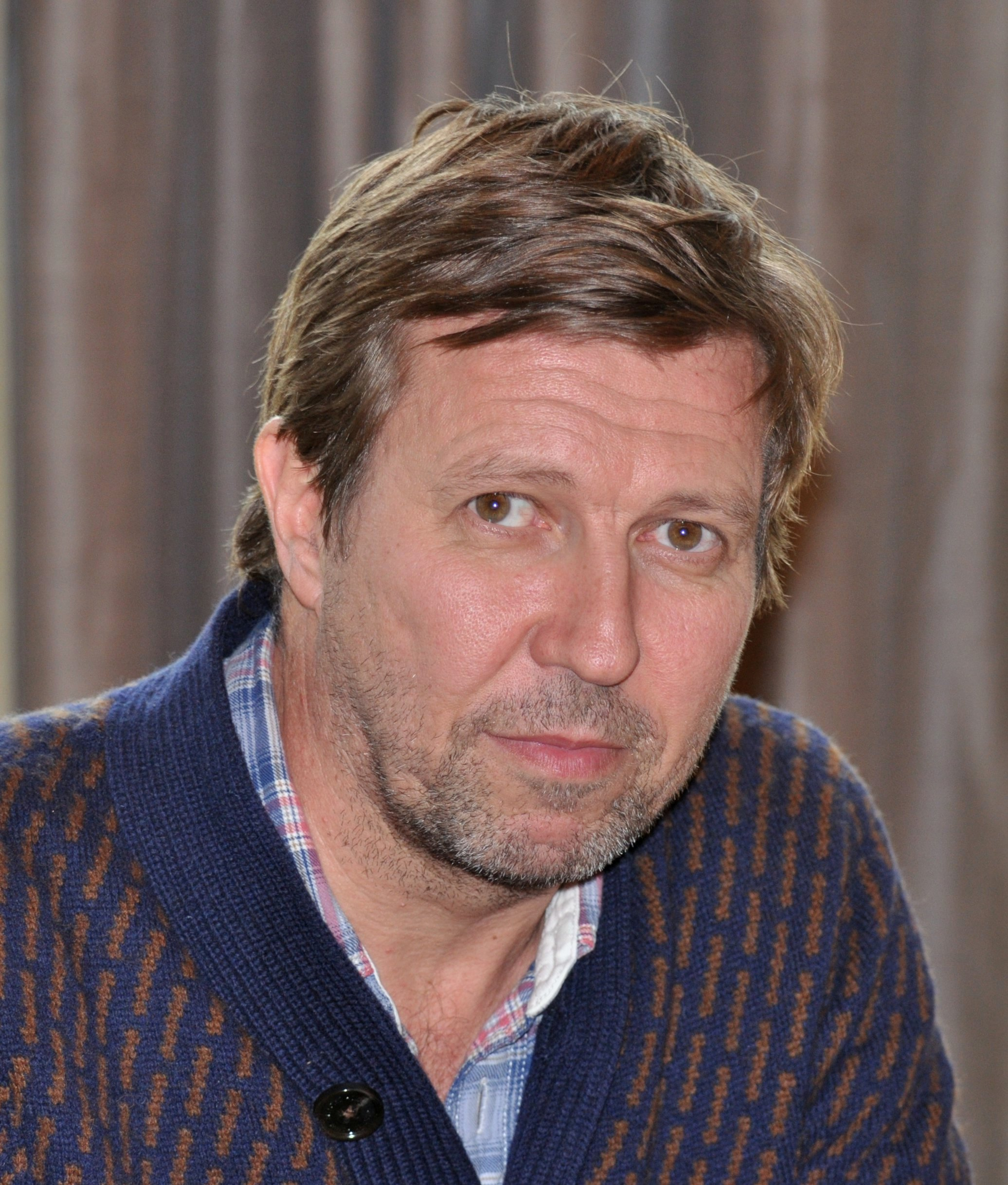
- Suosalo in 2012
- Born: Martti Juhani Suosalo; 19 July 1962 (age 64); Oulu, Finland
- Occupations: Actor, singer

Martti Juhani Suosalo (born 19 July 1962) is a Finnish actor and singer.

Suosalo was born in Oulu, and began his career in 1986 with an appearance in a TV series. He began to work as a regular actor on Finnish television but also appeared in several films in the early 1990s such as the 1994 film Aapo alongside actors such as Taisto Reimaluoto, Ulla Koivuranta and Kai Lehtinen.

Suosalo was admitted to the Helsinki Theatre Academy on his third attempt in 1983. At that time, from 1982 to 1985, Jouko Turkka was the rector of the Theatre Academy. Suosalo has estimated that he would never have been able to study at the school without Turkka. Suosalo graduated from the Theatre Academy in 1987.

While most of his work has been in television, in 1999, Suosalo appeared in just about every major film produced in Finland that year, appearing on the big screen in films such as Rentun ruusu, Sibelius and Lapin kullan kimallus.

In 2006, Suosalo has appeared in the TV series Ilonen talo and in the movie Kalteva torni, which stars another Suosalo family member, his seven-year-old daughter Siiri Suosalo, in her first major movie role.

Suosalo voiced the Finnish janitor Ahti in the 2019 video game Control by Remedy Entertainment, for which he won the British Academy Games Award for Performer in a Supporting Role. He reprises his role as Ahti for the 2023 video game Alan Wake II.

At the 2020 Vienna Independent Film Festival, Suosalo received the Best Actor award for his role in Laugh or Die (Suomen hauskin mies).

== Partial filmography ==
- The Winter War (Talvisota, 1989)
- Hobitit (1993)
- The Last Wedding (1995)
- The Swan and the Wanderer (Kulkuri ja joutsen, 1999)
- Gold Fever in Lapland (Lapin kullan kimallus, 1999)
- The Rose of the Rascal (Rentun ruusu, 2001)
- The Classic (Klassikko, 2001)
- Sibelius (2003)
- The Leaning Tower (Kalteva torni, 2006)
- Black Ice (Musta jää, 2007)
- Ricky Rapper (Risto Räppääjä, 2008)
- Last Cowboy Standing (Skavabölen pojat, 2009)
- Ricky Rapper and the Bicycle Thief (Risto Räppääjä ja polkupyörävaras, 2009)
- Ja saapuu oikea yö (2012)
- Control (2019, video game)
- Syke-elokuva: Hätätila (Based on the Finnish television series Syke, 2021)
- Jingle Bells (Kulkuset kulkuset, 2022)
- Fallen Leaves (Kuolleet lehdet, 2023)
- Alan Wake II (2023, video game)

== Awards and nominations ==
Year	Award	Category	Nominated work	Result	Ref.
2020	British Academy Games Awards	Performer in a Supporting Role	Control	Won	
2024	British Academy Games Awards	Performer in a Supporting Role	Alan Wake II	Longlisted	
