= Tero Jartti =

Finnish actor, director and screenwriter (born 1962)

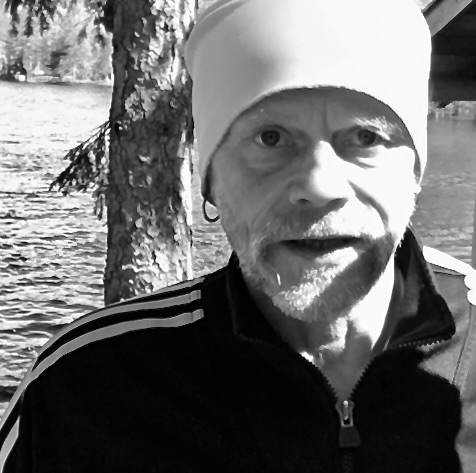
- Born: 16 March 1962 (age 63); Valtimo, Finland

Tero Jartti (born 16 March 1962 in Valtimo, Finland) is a Finnish actor, director, visual artist and screenwriter.

In 1994, Jartti directed Aapo, then In 2001 he acted in Cyclomania. In 2003, a busy year, he starred in some of the years films such as The Dark Side of the Car and Dead Ends.
