= The Christmas Party (film) =

- Original Finnish film poster
- Finnish: Joulubileet
- Directed by: Jari Halonen
- Produced by: Jari Halonen; Jorma Tommila; Heikki Ahonius
- Starring: Jorma Tommila; Antti Reini; Rauno Juvonen; Oiva Lohtander
- Production companies: Seppä Callahanin Filmimaailma; Ugri Films
- Release date: 29 November 1996 (Finland)
- Running time: 83 minutes
- Country: Finland
- Language: Finnish
- Budget: FIM 1.5 million

The Christmas Party (Finnish: Joulubileet) is a 1996 Finnish crime comedy film directed by Jari Halonen.

Although the film's success at the box office was modest, critics gave positive reviews and, years after its release, the film has gained a strong cult reputation. At the 1997 Jussi Awards, Jorma Tommila was awarded for the Best Actor and Oiva Lohtander for the Best Supporting Actor.

== Plot ==
It tells the story of a group of four men who have previously committed a failed robbery that landed one of them in prison, and when he is released, the other members of the foursome decide to throw the biggest Christmas party ever in his honor.

== Cast ==
- Jorma Tommila as Bona Merenkylä
- Antti Reini as Mike Merenkylä
- Rauno Juvonen as Joukka
- Oiva Lohtander as Hämäläinen
- Sari Havas as Lea, Bona's wife
- Jari Halonen as Dahlgren, neighbor
- Maija-Liisa Peuhu as downstairs neighbor
- Jukka Kärkkäinen as Hessu, downstairs neighbor
- Iris-Lilja Lassila as lonely woman from upstairs

The film also features the musician M. A. Numminen in a short supporting role.
