= Lapin kullan kimallus =

1999 film by Åke Lindman

Gold Fever in Lapland
- Theatrical release poster
- Finnish: Lapin kullan kimallus
- Directed by: Åke Lindman
- Written by: Åke Lindman, Heikki Vuento
- Produced by: Hanna Hemilä, Åke Lindman
- Starring: Vesa Vierikko, Pirkka-Pekka Petelius, Lasse Pöysti, Jarmo Mäkinen, Martti Suosalo, Kaija Pakarinen
- Production company: Åke Lindman Film Production
- Distributed by: Buena Vista International
- Release date: 10 September 1999
- Running time: 2h
- Country: Finland
- Language: Finnish

Lapin kullan kimallus (Finnish for The glitter of Lapland gold, English: Gold Fever in Lapland) is a 1999 Finnish movie, directed by Åke Lindman.

The movie is about the Lapland gold rush in the end of the 19th century. It stars Pirkka-Pekka Petelius as Nils Lepistö and Vesa Vierikko as Jakob Ervasti.

== Plot summary ==
In his hometown Oulu, Lepistö meets a man who shows him a map of Lapland, showing an "X" mark at the spot where he claims is gold. Lepistö believes the man and shows the map to his companion Ervasti. Lepistö and Ervasti travel to the Teno River, where they manage to find two kilograms of gold. They travel back to Oulu to lay official claim on the find site but are told it has already been claimed. Finally a large gold rush to Lapland starts.

== Reception ==
The film grossed $243,444 in its opening week.

== Notes ==
Despite the name, the movie has nothing to do with the Finnish brand of beer named Lapin Kulta (Gold of Lapland).
