= Spy Games =

1999 Finnish espionage film by Ilkka Järvi-Laturi

- DVD cover
- Directed by: Ilkka Järvi-Laturi
- Written by: Patrick Amos
- Produced by: Jonathan Karlsen
- Starring: Bill Pullman; Irène Jacob; Bruno Kirby
- Cinematography: Michel Amathieu; Stephane Fontaine
- Edited by: Alan Strachan
- Music by: Courtney Pine
- Distributed by: Trimark Pictures
- Release dates: 10 September 1999 (Canada); 22 October 1999 (Finland); 11 July 2000 (U.S.)
- Running time: 95 minutes
- Countries: Finland; United States
- Languages: English, Finnish

Spy Games (released in some countries as History Is Made at Night) is a 1999 film directed by Ilkka Järvi-Laturi, and starring Bill Pullman, Irène Jacob, and Bruno Kirby. Written by Patrick Amos, the film is about a jaded CIA agent and a young and beautiful SVR agent fighting to save the world, their lives, and their secret love in post Cold War Helsinki. Filmed in Helsinki, Finland and New York City, the movie incorporates elements of romance, action, and thriller genres. The film premiered at the 24th Toronto International Film Festival on 10 September 1999.

== Plot ==
Harry (Bill Pullman) is a seasoned CIA agent who is looking to forget his past and become his cover identity—a jazz club owner in Helsinki, Finland. Natasha (Irène Jacob) is a young, ambitious SVR (KGB) agent who is looking to secure a future for herself amidst the chaos of the new Russian Federation and her floundering intelligence agency. Originally assigned to spy on Harry, Natasha has fallen in love with the object of her spying, and her assignment has led to a torrid love affair between the two. Like all couples, they are keeping secrets from each other—but in their case, the secrets have international implications.

Harry's life with Natasha is disrupted when a young, over-zealous CIA agent, Dave (Glenn Plummer), comes to Helsinki to intercept a videotape encoded with state secrets en route from New York City. The videotape's hidden code is so sensitive that those who come in contact with the tape are soon killed. Dave is pursuing the unsuspecting courier, a manic ex-bond trader named Max (Bruno Kirby), who is unaware of what he is carrying. Max took the job by chance, following his recent prison term for stock market fraud. Natasha sees the videotape as a possible ticket out of the SVR and into the United States and the American Dream. In fact, everyone involved except Harry is planning to exploit the encoded videotape. Harry's only plan is to prevent Natasha from getting herself killed—or worse, from leaving him for the U.S.

== Cast ==
- Bill Pullman as Harry Howe / Ernie Halliday
- Irène Jacob as Natasha Scriabina / Anna Belinka
- Bruno Kirby as Max Fisher
- Glenn Plummer as Dave Preston
- Udo Kier as Ivan Bliniak
- André Oumansky as Yuri
- Féodor Atkine as Romanov
- Janne Kinnunen as Pekka
- Linda Zilliacus as Maija (credited as Linda Gyllenberg)
- Jevgeni Haukka as Slava
- Marcia Diamond as Lauren
- Henry Saari as Porn Man
- Louise Hodges as Porn Woman (credited as Louise Hodges)
- Bob Sherman as CIA Elder
- Kimmo Eloranta as Bodyguard
- Kati Outinen as Shopkeeper's Wife
- Kari Väänänen as Cabbie
- Courtney Pine as Jazz Band Member

== Production ==
Shooting locations included Helsinki and the Helsinki-Vantaa International Airport in Finland.

== Release ==
The film premiered at the Toronto International Film Festival on 10 September 1999, and opened in Finland on 22 October 1999. Spy Games was released on DVD in the United States on 11 July 2000.
