= Merisairas =

1996 thriller film

- Directed by: Veikko Aaltonen
- Starring: Bob Peck; Katrin Cartlidge; Peter Firth
- Release date: 1996
- Countries: Finland; France; Sweden
- Language: English

Merisairas (English-language title: Seasick) is a 1996 thriller film directed by Veikko Aaltonen and starring Bob Peck, Katrin Cartlidge and Peter Firth. An English-language film, it was a co-production between Sweden, Finland and France. The screenplay concerns eco-terrorists who attack a ship carrying toxic waste.

== Cast ==
- Bob Peck – Captain Sebastian Belger
- Katrin Cartlidge – Elena Polakov
- John Castle – Chief Engineer Josif Mantz
- Peter Firth – 1st Officer Roald Jensen
- Matti Onnismaa – 2nd Officer Pavic
- Sheila Gish – Martina Schaffer
- Giles Thomas – 3rd Officer Lew Melik
- John Bardon – Bosun Patrick Forget
- Ilari Johansson – Radio operator Jimmy Perez
- Claire Benedict – Cook Saba
- Richard Kill – Seaman Giles
- Antti Reini – 1st Engineer Tino Silenzi
- Frank Boyle – Seaman Etkind
- Juuso Hirvikangas – Seaman Juhani Turtola
- Mikael Kerimov – Doctor Barnier
- Clarke Peters – Radio reporter Pounds
- Jonathan Hutchings – Snuff Rawlings
