= The Last Wedding =

1995 film

- Original Finnish film poster
- Directed by: Markku Pölönen
- Written by: Markku Pölönen
- Based on: Kivenpyörittäjän kylä by Heikki Turunen
- Starring: Martti Suosalo
- Release date: 17 February 1995
- Running time: 90 minutes
- Country: Finland
- Language: Finnish
- Budget: FIM 5,970,646

The Last Wedding (Finnish: Kivenpyörittäjän kylä) is a 1995 Finnish comedy film directed by Markku Pölönen. It tells the story of Pekka, who arrives with his family from Sweden to his childhood village in North Karelia, whose residents are preparing for a wedding celebration. The film is based on the 1976 novel by Heikki Turunen.

The film was selected as the Finnish entry for the Best Foreign Language Film at the 68th Academy Awards, but was not accepted as a nominee.

== Cast ==
- Martti Suosalo as Pekka
- Henrika Andersson as Meeri
- Matti Varjo as Eljas
- Tanja Kortelainen as Jaana
- Jarmo Mäkinen as The Rockroller
- Rauha Valkonen as Linnea

== See also ==
- List of submissions to the 68th Academy Awards for Best Foreign Language Film
- List of Finnish submissions for the Academy Award for Best Foreign Language Film
