= Veikko Aaltonen =

Finnish film director, actor and film editor (born 1955)

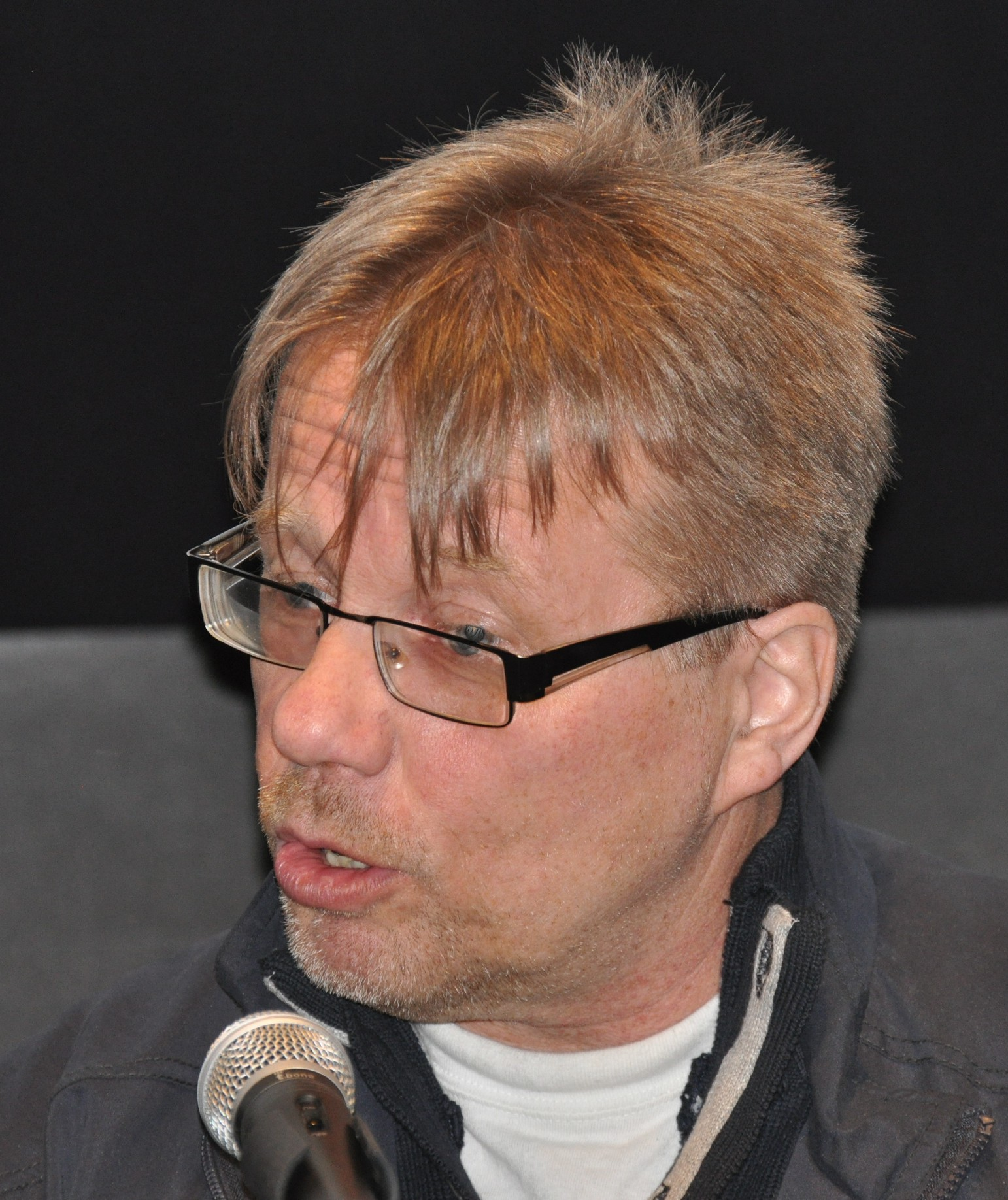
- Veikko Aaltonen in 2013
- Born: 1 December 1955 (age 70); Sääksmäki, Finland
- Occupations: Director, editor, sound editor, production manager, film and television writer and actor

Veikko Aaltonen (born 1 December 1955) is a Finnish director, editor, sound editor, production manager and film and television writer and actor.

== Biography ==
Aaltonen was born in Sääksmäki. He began his career in the mid-1970s working as a sound editor on various films. Early in his career, he worked with Rauni Mollberg as co-writer on two of his films, Milka – A Film About Taboos (1980) and The Unknown Soldier (1985).

In 1987, Aaltonen directed his first feature film, The Final Arrangement (Tilinteko), which he co-wrote with Aki Kaurismäki, who also produced the film. Five years later, he directed a film that has been considered his primary breakthrough, The Prodigal Son (Tuhlaajapoika, 1992). Aaltonen was the first Finnish director to work on topics like pedophilia, Sadomasochism and sexual subjugation without credibility and morality.

Aaltonen has also made documentaries and directed TV series.

== Partial filmography ==
- The Worthless (Arvottomat, 1982) – actor
- Crime and Punishment (Rikos ja rangaistus, 1983) – editor
- The Unknown Soldier (Tuntematon sotilas, 1985) – co-writer
- La Vie de Bohème (Boheemielämää, 1992) – editor
- Our Father... (Isä meidän, 1993) – director, writer, editor
- Seasick (Merisairas, 1996) – director, co-editor
- Kiss Me in the Rain (Rakkaudella, Maire, 1999) – director, editor
- The Earth (Maa, documentary film, 2001) – director, editor, writer
- Working Class (Työväenluokka, 2004) – director, writer, editor
- Trench Road (Juoksuhaudantie, 2004) – director, writer
- The Shepherds (Paimenet, documentary film, 2005) – director, writer
- Uudisraivaaja (television drama series, 2006) – director
- Sydänjää (television drama series, 2007) – director
- Harvoin tarjolla (television drama series, 2008) – director
- Helppo elämä (television drama series, 2009–2011) – director
- Kansan mies (television drama series, 2013–2014) – director
- Rahti (2021) – writer
