= Ulla Koivuranta =

Finnish actress (born 1959)

- Born: 19 March 1959 (age 66); Vaasa, Finland
- Occupation: actress
- Years active: 1986–1997

Ulla Koivuranta (born 19 March 1959, in Vaasa, Finland) is a Finnish actress.

In 1991 she began work at the Turku Theatre.

She played the role of Lempi in the 1994 film Aapo.

== Filmography ==
- Hyvän tekijät (1997), released as Good Deeds in the US, as Nainen työvoimatoimistossa
- Viisasten kivi (1996) .... Salli
- Lipton Cockton in the Shadows of Sodoma (1995), as Lipton Cockton (Finland: short title), as Irma
- Aapo (1994) .... Lempi
- Back to the USSR – takaisin Ryssiin (1992) .... Molla Elo
- Linna (1986)
- Fakta homma .... Nainen terassilla (1 episode, 1986) – Kuoro ja kapakka (1986)
