= Shadow of the Eagle (2005 film) =

- DVD cover
- Directed by: Timo Koivusalo
- Written by: Timo Koivusalo
- Starring: Mikko Leppilampi, Vesa-Matti Loiri, Helena Vierikko
- Distributed by: Buena Vista International
- Release date: 9 September 2005
- Running time: 105 minutes
- Country: Finland
- Language: Finnish

Shadow of the Eagle (Finnish: Kaksipäisen kotkan varjossa) is a 2005 Finnish film directed and written by Timo Koivusalo.

== Plot ==
The film is about an early twentieth century Finnish poet under the Russian regime.

== Cast ==
- Mikko Leppilampi as Aaro
- Vesa-Matti Loiri as Verneri
- Helena Vierikko as Ella
- Anneli Saaristo as Saara
- Tapio Liinoja as commander
- Anna-Kaisa Tommila as Veera
- Vesa Vierikko as vicar
- Eriikka Väliahde as Maria
- Esko Nikkari as Aaro's father
- Seela Sella as Aaro's mother
- Antti Luusuaniemi as Antti
- Sampo Sarkola as Aleksi
