= The Swan and the Wanderer =

- Directed by: Timo Koivusalo
- Written by: Timo Koivusalo; Juha Numminen
- Produced by: Timo Koivusalo
- Starring: Tapio Liinoja; Martti Suosalo; Heikki Nousiainen
- Distributed by: Buena Vista International
- Release date: February 19, 1999
- Running time: 102 minutes
- Country: Finland
- Language: Finnish
- Box office: $175,358 in opening week

The Swan and the Wanderer (Finnish: Kulkuri ja joutsen) is a Finnish film telling the story of two very popular Finnish singer/songwriters, Tapio Rautavaara (Tapio Liinoja) and Reino Helismaa (Martti Suosalo), who worked together until their relationship got fractious for a long time. The film covers the years from 1949 to 1965, the date of Helismaa's death.

The film also tells about the change in Finland during those years.

== Cast ==
- Tapio Liinoja as Tapio Rautavaara
- Martti Suosalo as Reino Helismaa
- Heikki Nousiainen as Esa Pakarinen
- Ari Virta as Masa Niemi
- Matti Mäntylä as Toivo Kärki
- Tuija Piepponen as Siiri Angerkoski
- Raimo Grönberg as Olavi Virta

== Reception ==
The film grossed $175,358 in its opening week.
