= Taisto Reimaluoto =

Finnish actor (born 1961)

- Born: 28 September 1961 (age 64); Helsinki, Finland

Taisto Reimaluoto (born 28 September 1961, in Helsinki) is a Finnish actor.

Reimaluoto began his career in films and in 1994, he appeared in Aapo as the lead character.

However since 1995 he has become a prolific Finnish television actor only appearing in several films such as Ambush (known as Rukajärven tie in Finland) in 1999.
