= Timo Koivusalo =

Finnish actor (born 1963)

Timo Johannes Koivusalo
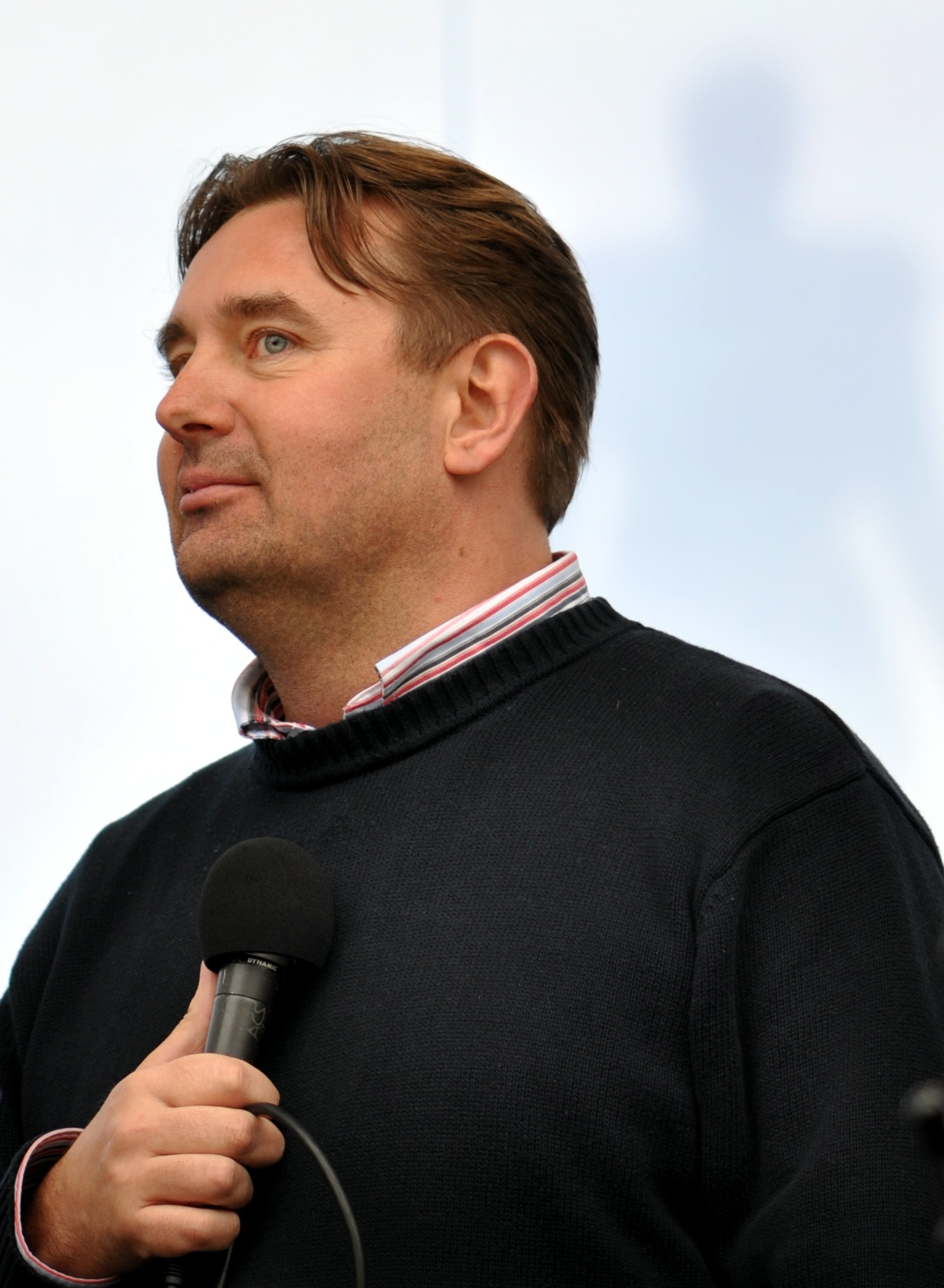
- Born: 31 October 1963 (age 62); Pori, Finland

Timo Johannes Koivusalo (born 31 October 1963) is a Finnish actor, director, writer, composer and musician. His most successful film to date was Rentun Ruusu, released in 2001.

== Life and career ==
Koivusalo was born in Pori, and trained as a chef and a mental nurse, before getting a breakthrough into the entertainment industry with his character Pekko Aikamiespoika, developed while he was working as a stand-up comedian. As Pekko Aikamiespoika, Koivusalo twice won the Finnish joketelling championships and made two comedy cassettes. In 1992, Koivusalo appeared in the TV series Pekko Aikamiespoika, followed by a full-length movie the following year entitled Pekko Aikamiespojan poikamiesaika. Five Pekko movies were made in total, with Koivusalo producing, directing and writing the script as well as playing the lead role.

== Film director ==
After the movie Pekko ja unissakävelijä (1997), Koivusalo retired the character of Pekko Aikamiespoika and focused on directing. His next films were biographies: Kulkuri ja joutsen (1999), about Tapio Rautavaara and Reino Helismaa, Rentun ruusu (2001) about Irwin Goodman, and Sibelius (2003), the first feature-length biopic of Jean Sibelius. Koivusalo's film Kaksipäisen kotkan varjossa (2005) is an adventure musical set in Finland during the period of russification. Koivusalo and his common-law wife, Susanna Palin, composed the soundtrack for the movie.

Koivusalo's films have not been received well by Finnish movie critics, but they have been box office successes.

Koivusalo's most recent film is Kalteva Torni (The Leaning Tower), which was released in Finland on 20 October 2006. Kalteva torni is about a benevolent man who does not know he has multiple personalities, whose greatest fear is that he will not be able to see the Leaning Tower of Pisa before it falls.

In January 2022 it was announced that Koivusalo's film based on the Pelle Hermanni character will be released in autumn 2022.

== Other work ==
Koivusalo has also worked as a television presenter. From 1992 to 2002, he co-hosted the TV2 show Tuttu Juttu Show, with Joel Hallikainen. Hallikainen left the show in the spring of 2000, after which Koivusalo co-hosted with various presenters. The show originated from Elämäntoveri, a comedy routine that Hallikainen and Koivusalo used to perform on ships travelling between Finland and Sweden. From 2002 to 2006, Koivusalo also hosted a game show on TV2 called Leikin varjolla.

Koivusalo has written two books: Pekko ja outolintu (1997) and Rysän päältä – siikahyvä ruokakirja (2005). The latter was written with restaurateur Jani Lehtinen and reporter Mikko Peltola. He has also had a column in the Helsingin Sanomat.

== Filmography ==
- Pekko aikamiespojan poikamiesaika (1993)
- Pekko ja poika (1994)
- Pekko ja massahurmaaja (1995)
- Pekko ja muukalainen (1996)
- Pekko ja unissakävelijä (1997)
- Kulkuri ja Joutsen (1999)
- Rentun Ruusu (2001)
- Sibelius (2003)
- Kaksipäisen kotkan varjossa (2005)
- Kalteva torni (2006)
- Täällä Pohjantähden alla (2009)

== Television ==
- Pekko Aikamiespoika (1992)
- Tuttu Juttu Show (1992–2002, 2019)
- Leikin varjolla (2002–2006)
