= Jussi Award for Best Director =

Finnish film award

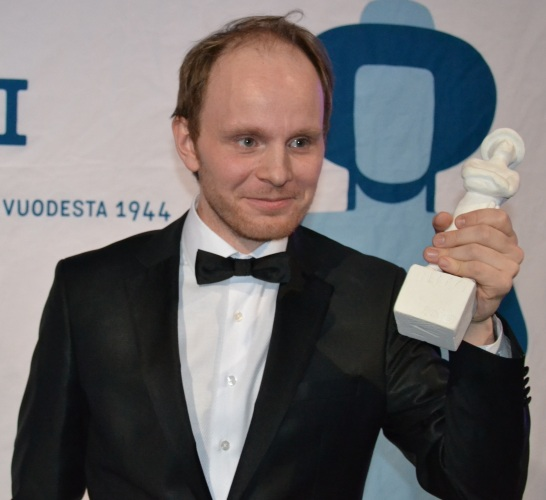

Jussi Award for Best Director is an award presented annually at the Jussi Awards by Filmiaura, a Finnish film organization founded in 1962. The Jussi Awards were created by Elokuvajournalistit ry in 1944 and the first ceremony was held the same year, honoring Finnish films released between 1942 and 1944.

== Winners ==
Table key
‡	Indicates the winner
^	Indicates posthumous winner

Year	Director(s)	Film	English title
1942/43/44 (1st)	Hannu Leminen ‡	Valkoiset ruusut	White Roses
1944/45 (2nd)	Valentin Vaala ‡	Dynamiittityttö; Linnaisten vihreä kamari	The Girl and the Gangsters; The Green Chamber of Linnais
1945/46 (3rd)	N/A		
1946/47 (4th)	Valentin Vaala ‡	Loviisa – Niskavuoren nuori emäntä	Lovisa, the Young Mistress of Niskavuori
1947/48 (5th)	Roland af Hällström ‡	Pikajuna pohjoiseen	North Express
1948/49 (6th)	Valentin Vaala ‡ Lea Joutseno ‡	Ihmiset suviyössä	People in the Summer Night
1949/50 (7th)	Toivo Särkkä ‡	Katupeilin takana	Behind the Mirror in the Window
1950/51 (8th)	Matti Kassila ‡	Radio tekee murron	The Radio Commits a Burglary
1951/52 (9th)	Valentin Vaala ‡	Omena putoaa	The Apple Falls
1952/53 (10th)	Edvin Laine ‡	Niskavuoren Heta	Heta from Niskavuori
1953/54 (11th)	Matti Kassila ‡	Sininen viikko Tyttö kuunsillalta	Blue Week; The Girl from Moon Bridge
1954/55 (12th)	Matti Kassila ‡	Isän vanha ja uusi Hilmanpäivät	Father's New and Ex; Hilma's Name Day
1955/56 (13th)	Edvin Laine ‡	Tuntematon sotilas	The Unknown Soldier
1956/57 (14th)	Matti Kassila ‡	Elokuu	The Harvest Month
1957/58 (15th)	N/A		
1958/59 (16th)	Jack Witikka ‡	Mies tältä tähdeltä	A Man from This Planet
1959/60 not held	N/A		
1960/61 not held	N/A		
1961 (17th)	Maunu Kurkvaara ‡	Rakas...	Darling
1962 (18th)	Mikko Niskanen ‡	Pojat	The Boys
1963 (19th)	Mikko Niskanen ‡	Sissit	The Partisans
1964/65 (20th)	Risto Jarva ‡	Onnenpeli	–
1966 (21st)	Mikko Niskanen ‡	Käpy selän alla	Skin, Skin
1967 (22nd)	Risto Jarva ‡ Mikko Niskanen ‡	Työmiehen päiväkirja Lapualaismorsian	The Diary of a Worker; Girl of Finland
1968 (23rd)	Jörn Donner ‡ Edvin Laine ‡ Timo Bergholm ‡	Mustaa valkoisella Täällä Pohjantähden alla Punahilkka	Black on White; Here, Beneath the North Star; Little Red Riding Hood
1969 (24th)	Erkko Kivikoski ‡	Kesyttömät veljekset	The Brothers
1970 (25th)	Risto Jarva ‡	Bensaa suonissa	Rally (Gas in the Veins)
1971/72 (26th)	Mikko Niskanen ‡	Kahdeksan surmanluotia	Eight Deadly Shots
1972/73 (27th)	Erkko Kivikoski ‡ Rauni Mollberg ‡ Veikko Kerttula ‡	Laukaus tehtaalla Sotaerakko (TV movie); Se tavallinen tarina (TV movie)	A Shot in the Factory; Hermit of War; The Usual Story
1973/74 (28th)	Rauni Mollberg ‡	Maa on syntinen laulu	The Earth Is a Sinful Song
1974/75 (29th)	Jaakko Pakkasvirta ‡ Veikko Kerttula ‡	Jouluksi kotiin Simpauttaja (TV movie)	Home for Christmas –
1975/76 (30th)	N/A		
1976/77 (31st)	Heikki Partanen ‡ Katariina Lahti ‡ Riitta Rautoma ‡	Antti Puuhaara	Antti the Treebranch
1977/78 (32nd)	Rauni Mollberg ‡ Risto Jarva ^	Aika hyvä ihmiseksi Jäniksen vuosi	People Not as Bad as They Seem; The Year of the Hare
1978/79 (33rd)	Timo Linnasalo ‡	Vartioitu kylä 1944	The Guarded Village 1944
1979/80 (34th)	N/A		
1980/81 (35th)	Erkko Kivikoski ‡ Pirjo Honkasalo ‡ Pekka Lehto ‡	Yö meren rannalla Tulipää; Tulipää	Night by the Seashore; Flame Top; Flame Top
1981/82 (36th)	Mikko Niskanen ‡	Ajolähtö	Gotta Run!
1982/83 (37th)	Mika Kaurismäki ‡	Arvottomat	The Worthless
1983/84 (38th)	Tapio Suominen ‡ Heikki Partanen ‡	Musta hurmio (TV movie); Pessi ja Illusia	– Pessi and Illusia
1984/85 (39th)	Timo Humaloja ‡	8. päivä (TV movie); Yksinpuhelu (TV movie)	– –
1985 (40th)	Rauni Mollberg ‡	Tuntematon sotilas	The Unknown Soldier
1986 (41st)	N/A		
1987 (42nd)	Åke Lindman ‡	Den förtollade vägen (TV movie)	–
1988 (43rd)	Pekka Parikka ‡	Pohjanmaa	Plainlands
1989 (44th)	Pekka Parikka ‡	Talvisota	The Winter War
1990 (45th)	Aki Kaurismäki ‡	Tulitikkutehtaan tyttö	The Match Factory Girl
1991 (46th)	Mika Kaurismäki ‡	Zombie ja Kummitusjuna	Zombie and the Ghost Train
1992 (47th)	Aki Kaurismäki ‡	Boheemielämää	The Bohemian Life
1993 (48th)	Veikko Aaltonen ‡	Isä meidän	Pater Noster
1994 (49th)	Aleksi Mäkelä ‡	Esa ja Vesa – auringonlaskun ratsastajat	Sunset Riders
1995 (50th)	Markku Pölönen ‡	Kivenpyörittäjän kylä	The Last Wedding
1996 (51st)	Aki Kaurismäki ‡	Kauas pilvet karkaavat	Drifting Clouds
1997 (52nd)	Olli Saarela ‡	Lunastus	The Redemption
1998 (53rd)	Markku Pölönen ‡	Kuningasjätkä	A Summer by the River
1999 (54th)	Olli Saarela ‡	Rukajärven tie	Ambush
2000 (55th)	Olli Saarela ‡	Bad Luck Love	Bad Luck Love
2001 (56th)	Jarmo Lampela ‡	Joki	The River
2002 (57th)	Aki Kaurismäki ‡	Mies vailla menneisyyttä	The Man Without a Past
2003 (58th)	Jarmo Lampela ‡	Eila	Eila
2004 (59th)	Markku Pölönen ‡	Koirankynnen leikkaaja	Dog Nail Clipper
2005 (60th)	Aku Louhimies ‡	Paha maa	Frozen Land
2006 (61st)	Aku Louhimies ‡	Valkoinen kaupunki	Frozen City
2007 (62nd)	Petri Kotwica ‡	Musta jää	Black Ice
2008 (63rd)	Dome Karukoski ‡	Tummien perhosten koti	The Home of Dark Butterflies
2009 (64th)	Klaus Härö ‡	Postia pappi Jaakobille	Letters to Father Jacob
2010 (65th)	Dome Karukoski ‡	Napapiirin sankarit	Lapland Odyssey
2011 (66th)	Aki Kaurismäki ‡	Le Havre	Le Havre
2012 (67th)	Maarit Lalli ‡	Kohta 18	Almost 18
2013 (68th)	Pirjo Honkasalo ‡	Betoniyö	Concrete Night
2014 (69th)	J.-P. Valkeapää ‡	He ovat paenneet	They Have Escaped
2015 (70th)	Aleksi Salmenperä ‡	Häiriötekijä	Distractions
2016 (71st)	Juho Kuosmanen ‡	Hymyilevä mies	The Happiest Day in the Life of Olli Mäki
2017 (72nd)	Antti-Jussi Annila ‡	Ikitie	The Eternal Road
2018 (73rd)	Aleksi Salmenperä ‡	Tyhjiö	Void
2019 (74th)	Miia Tervo ‡	Aurora	Aurora

== Multiple winners ==
Wins	Director
6	Mikko Niskanen
5	Aki Kaurismäki
4	Risto Jarva
4	Matti Kassila
4	Rauni Mollberg
4	Valentin Vaala
3	Erkko Kivikoski
3	Edvin Laine
3	Markku Pölönen
3	Olli Saarela
2	Dome Karukoski
2	Mika Kaurismäki
2	Jarmo Lampela
2	Aku Louhimies
2	Pekka Parikka
2	Aleksi Salmenperä
