= Jussi Award for Best Actress =

Discontinued award presented by the Jussi Awards

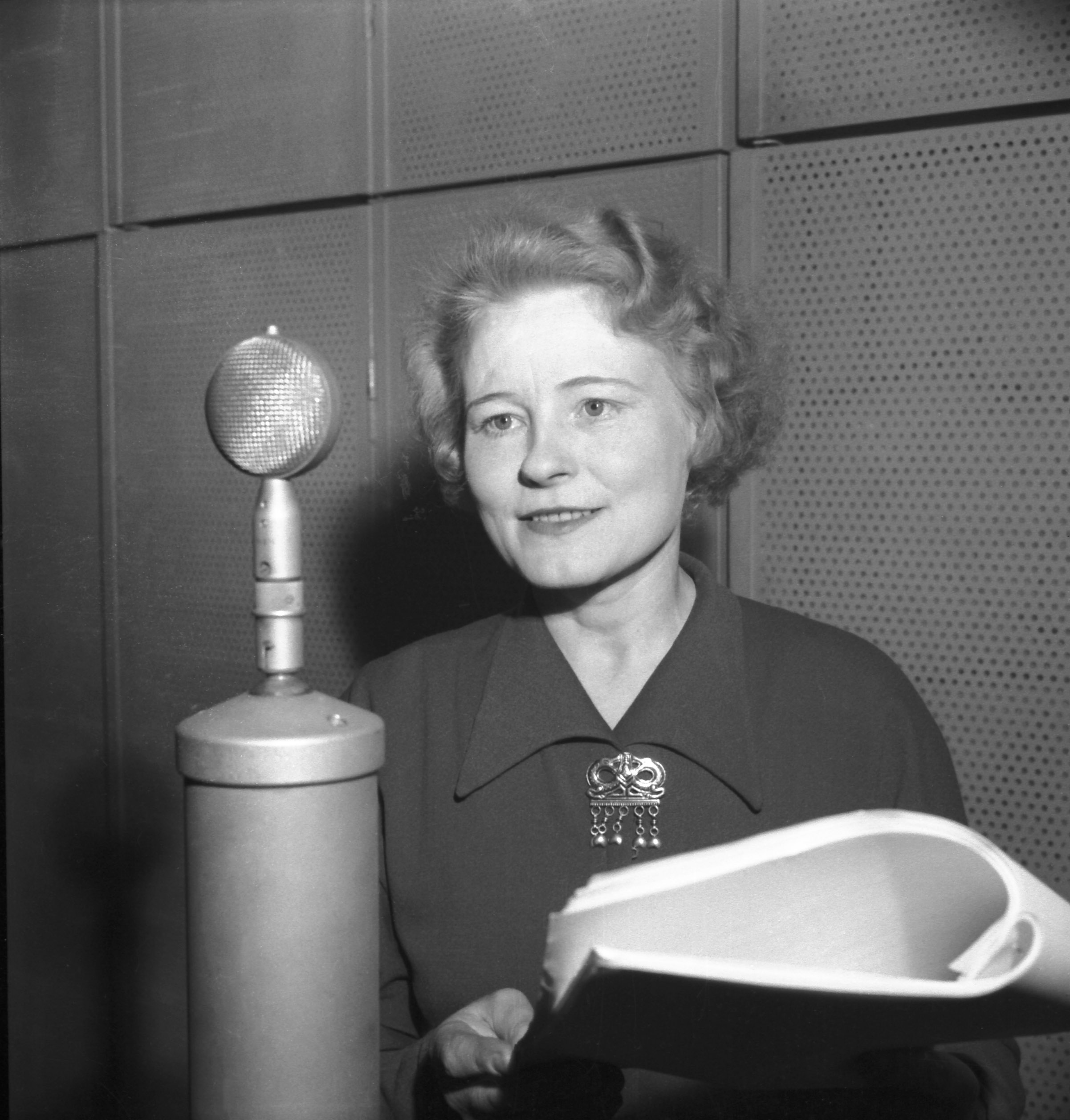
- Emma Väänänen had the most wins with four
- Awarded for: Best Performance by an Actress in a Leading Role
- Presented by: Filmiaura
- First award: 1944
- Final award: 2022
- Currently held by: Seidi Haarla; Compartment No. 6 (2022)

The Jussi Award for Best Actress was an award presented annually at the Jussi Awards, the premier film industry event in Finland, between 1944 and 2022. In the spring of 2022, Filmiaura's board introduced the gender-neutral Jussi Award for Best Leading Performance, which started from the 76th Jussi Awards in 2023. The 1st Jussi Awards ceremony was held in 1944, with Ansa Ikonen winning the first Jussi Award for Best Actress for her performance in Vaivaisukon morsian, and Seidi Haarla was the last winner in Compartment No. 6 at the 75th Jussi Awards in 2022.

== Winners ==
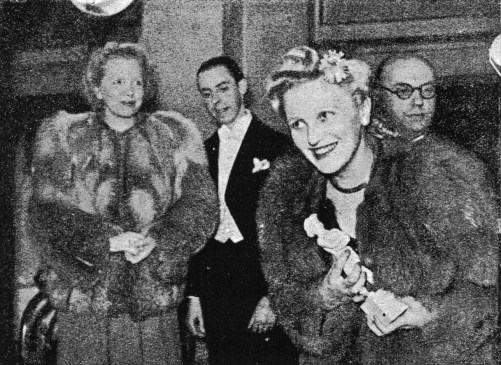
Ansa Ikonen receiving her Jussi Award during the 1st ceremony in 1944.

Year	Actress	Film	English title	Ref.
1943 (1st)	Ansa Ikonen	Vaivaisukon morsian	The Wooden Pauper's Bride	
1944 (2nd)	Lea Joutseno	Dynamiittityttö	The Girl and the Gangsters	
1945 (3rd)	Regina Linnanheimo	Levoton veri, Rakkauden risti	Restless Blood, Cross of Love	
1946 (4th)	Emma Väänänen	Loviisa – Niskavuoren nuori emäntä	Louisa	
1947 (5th)	Eeva-Kaarina Volanen	Naiskohtaloita	Destinies of Women	
1948 (6th)	Eeva-Kaarina Volanen	Ruma Elsa	Ugly Elsa	
1949 (7th)	Eeva-Kaarina Volanen	Katupeilin takana, Hallin Janne	Behind the Mirror in the Window, Hallin Janne	
1950 (8th)	Emma Väänänen	Gabriel, tule takaisin	Gabriel, Come Back	
1951 (9th)	Mirjami Kuosmanen	Valkoinen peura	The White Reindeer	
1952 (10th)	Rauni Luoma	Niskavuoren Heta	Heta from Niskavuori	
1953 (11th)	Maija Karhi	Kun on tunteet	When There Are Feelings	
1954 (12th)	Rakel Laakso	Opri	–	
1955 (13th)	Not presented			
1956 (14th)	Emma Väänänen	Elokuu	The Harvest Month	
1957 (15th)	Emma Väänänen	Niskavuoren naiset	Women of Niskavuori	
1958 (16th)	Tea Ista	Mies tältä tähdeltä	A Man from This Star	
1959 not held	Not presented			
1960 not held	Not presented			
1961 (17th)	Sinikka Hannula	Rakas...	Darling	
1962 (18th)	Ruth Snellman	Ihana seikkailu	A Wonderful Adventure	
1963 (19th)	Not presented			
1964 not held	Not presented			
1965 (20th)	Riitta Elstelä	Onnelliset leikit	Happy Games	
1966 (21st)	Elli Castrén	Rakkaus alkaa aamuyöstä	Love Begins in the Morning	
1967 (22nd)	Kristiina Halkola	Lapualaismorsian	Girl of Finland	
1968 (23rd)	Liisamaija Laaksonen	Mustaa valkoisella, Vain neljä kertaa	Black on White, Four Times Only	
1969 (24th)	Ritva Vepsä	Ruusujen aika, Sixtynine 69	Time of Roses, Sixtynine	
1970 (25th)	Hillevi Lagerstam; Siiri Angerkoski	Takiaispallo; Aliisa	Flowering Thistle –	
1971–72 (26th)	Eeva-Maija Haukinen; Eila Pehkonen	Kun taivas putoaa... Se on sitten kevät	When the Heavens Fell; It's Spring Then	
1972 (27th)	Tea Ista	Haluan rakastaa, Peter	I Want to Love, Peter	
1973 (28th)	Tuula Nyman; Anja Pohjola; Aino Lehtimäki	Yhden miehen sota Rautatie; Solveigin laulu	One Man's War; Railway; I'm Solving a Song	
1974 (29th)	Not presented			
1975 (30th)	Leena Uotila	Rakastunut rampa	Cripple in Love	
1976 (31st)	Tuula Nyman	Loma	Olympian Holiday	
1977 (32nd)	Irma Seikkula; Raili Veivo; Nanny Westerlund	Aika hyvä ihmiseksi Aika hyvä ihmiseksi Tuntematon ystävä	People Not as Bad as They Seem; People Not as Bad as They Seem; An Unknown Friend	
1978 (33rd)	Elina Salo	Runoilija ja muusa	Poet and Muse	
1979 (34th)	Not presented			
1980 (35th)	Rea Mauranen; Eeva Eloranta	Tulipää; Yö meren rannalla	Flame Top; Night by the Seashore	
1981 (36th)	Not presented			
1982 (37th)	Not presented			
1983 (38th)	Eeva Eloranta	Palava enkeli, Zoja	Burning Angel, –	
1984 (39th)	Rauni Luoma	Niskavuori	The Tug of Home: The Famous Niskavuori Saga	
1985 (40th)	Soli Labbart	Kunniallinen petkuttaja	The True Deceiver	
1986 (41st)	Pirjo Leppänen	Elämän vonkamies	Life's Hardy Men	
1987 (42nd)	Kaija Pakarinen	Tilinteko	The Final Arrangement	
1988 (43rd)	Liisamaija Laaksonen	Ihmiselon ihanuus ja kurjuus	The Glory and Misery of Human Life	
1989 (44th)	Pirkko Hämäläinen	Paperitähti	Paper Star	
1990 (45th)	Kati Outinen	Tulitikkutehtaan tyttö	The Match Factory Girl	
1991 (46th)	Irma Junnilainen	Viiva vinita – tavallisen ihmisen museo	Viiva Vinita	
1992 (47th)	Merja Larivaara	Kaivo	The Well	
1993 (48th)	Tiina Lymi	Akvaariorakkaus	Love in a Fish Bowl	
1994 (49th)	Not presented			
1995 (50th)	Päivi Akonpelto	Suolaista ja makeaa	Bittersweet	
1996 (51st)	Kati Outinen	Kauas pilvet karkaavat	Drifting Clouds	
1997 (52nd)	Leea Klemola	Neitoperho	The Collector	
1998 (53rd)	Elena Leeve	Tulennielijä	Fire-Eater	
1999 (54th)	Eeva Litmanen	Rakkaudella, Maire	Kiss Me in the Rain	
2000 (55th)	Outi Mäenpää	Lomalla	The South	
2001 (56th)	Irina Björklund	Minä ja Morrison	Me and Morrison	
2002 (57th)	Kati Outinen	Mies vailla menneisyyttä	The Man Without a Past	
2003 (58th)	Sari Mällinen	Eila	–	
2004 (59th)	Outi Mäenpää	Kukkia ja sidontaa	Flowers and Binding	
2005 (60th)	Maria Lundqvist	Äideistä parhain	Mother of Mine	
2006 (61st)	Susanna Anteroinen	Valkoinen kaupunki	Frozen City	
2007 (62nd)	Outi Mäenpää	Musta jää	Black Ice	
2008 (63rd)	Elena Leeve	Putoavia enkeleitä	Falling Angels	
2009 (64th)	Minna Haapkylä	Kuulustelu	The Interrogation	
2010 (65th)	Katja Küttner	Prinsessa	Princess	
2011 (66th)	Elina Knihtilä	Hyvä poika	The Good Son	
2012 (67th)	Laura Birn	Puhdistus	Purge	
2013 (68th)	Leea Klemola	Kerron sinulle kaiken	Open Up to Me	
2014 (69th)	Anu Sinisalo	Ei kiitos	No Thank You	
2015 (70th)	Krista Kosonen	Kätilö	Wildeye	
2016 (71st)	Linnea Skog	Tyttö nimeltä Varpu	Little Wing	
2017 (72nd)	Krista Kosonen	Miami	–	
2018 (73rd)	Oona Airola	Oma maa	Land of Hope	
2019 (73rd)	Mimosa Willamo	Aurora	–	
2020 (74th)	Alma Pöysti	Tove	–	
2021 (75th)	Seidi Haarla	Hytti nro 6	Compartment No. 6	

== Multiple awards ==
4 awards

- Emma Väänänen (2 consecutive)

3 awards

- Outi Mäenpää
- Kati Outinen
- Eeva-Kaarina Volanen (3 consecutive)

2 awards

- Eeva Eloranta
- Tea Ista
- Leea Klemola
- Krista Kosonen
- Liisamaija Laaksonen
- Elena Leeve
- Rauni Luoma
- Tuula Nyman
