= 2nd Jussi Awards =

Finnish film awards ceremony in 1945

- Date: September 30, 1945
- Site: Restaurant Adlon; Helsinki, Finland

Highlights
- Most awards: Linnaisten vihreä kamari (4)

The 2nd Jussi Awards ceremony, presented by Elokuvajournalistit ry, honored the best Finnish films released between October 1, 1944 and September 30, 1945 and took place on November 16, 1945 at Restaurant Adlon in Helsinki. The Jussi Awards were presented in seven different categories, including Best Director, Best Cinematography, Best Production Design, Best Actor, Best Actress, Best Supporting Actor, and Best Supporting Actress.

== Awards ==
Best Director: Valentin Vaala – Dynamiittityttö‡ and Linnaisten vihreä kamari‡	Best Cinematography: Eino Heino – Linnaisten vihreä kamari‡
Best Actor: Rauli Tuomi – Linnaisten vihreä kamari‡	Best Actress: Lea Joutseno – Dynamiittityttö‡
Best Supporting Actor: Yrjö Tuominen – Ristikon varjossa‡	Best Supporting Actress: Siiri Angerkoski – Anna-Liisa‡
Best Production Design: Tapio "Roy" Vilpponen – Linnaisten vihreä kamari‡
