= Jussi Award for Best Actor =

Discontinued award presented by the Jussi Awards

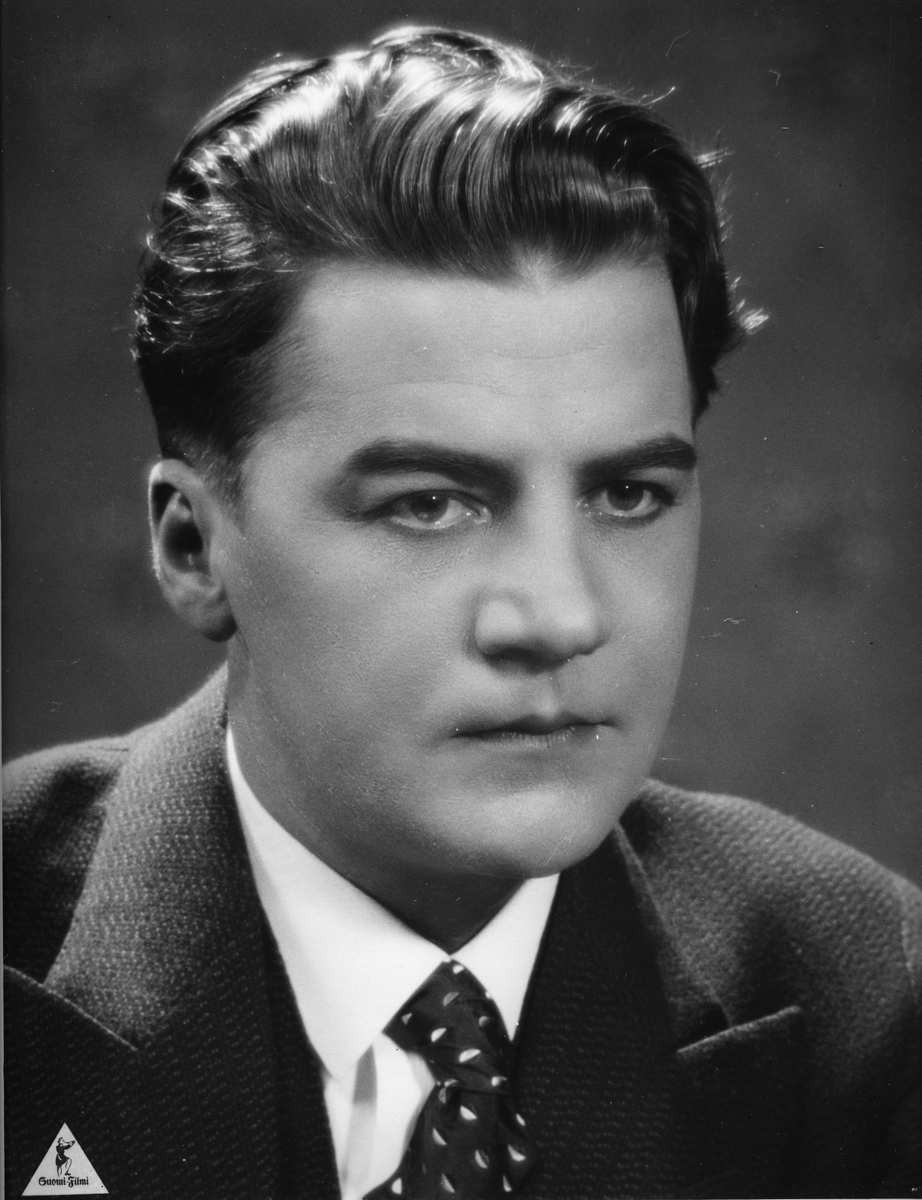
- Joel Rinne was the first recipient of the award in 1944
- Awarded for: Best Performance by an Actor in a Leading Role
- Presented by: Filmiaura
- First award: 1944
- Final award: 2022
- Currently held by: Petri Poikolainen; The Blind Man Who Did Not Want to See Titanic (2022)

The Jussi Award for Best Actor was an award presented annually at the Jussi Awards, the premier film industry event in Finland, between 1944 and 2022. In the spring of 2022, Filmiaura's board introduced the gender-neutral Jussi Award for Best Leading Performance, which started from the 76th Jussi Awards in 2023. The 1st Jussi Awards ceremony was held in 1944, with Joel Rinne winning the first Jussi Award for Best Actor for his performance in Kirkastettu sydän, and Petri Poikolainen was the last winner in The Blind Man Who Did Not Want to See Titanic at the 75th Jussi Awards in 2022.

== Winners ==
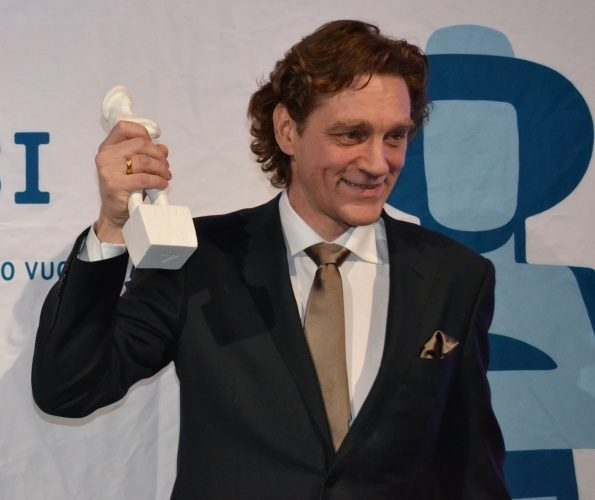
Actor Ville Virtanen after winning the Jussi Award in 2011.

Year	Actor	Film	English title
1943 (1st)	Joel Rinne	Kirkastettu sydän	The Transfigured Heart
1944 (2nd)	Rauli Tuomi	Linnaisten vihreä kamari	The Green Chamber of Linnais
1945 (3rd)	Tauno Palo	Menneisyyden varjo	Shadow of the Past
1946 (4th)	Rauli Tuomi	”Minä elän”	”I Live”
1947 (5th)	Leif Wager	Läpi usvan	Through the Fog
1948 (6th)	Martti Katajisto	Ihmiset suviyössä	People in the Summer Night
1949 (7th)	Tauno Palo	Härmästä poikia kymmenen	Ten Men from Härmä
1950 (8th)	Hannes Häyrinen	Radio tekee murron	The Radio Burglary
1951 (9th)	Tauno Palo	Omena putoaa...	Apple Falls
1952 (10th)	Kaarlo Halttunen	Niskavuoren Heta	Heta from Niskavuori
1953 (11th)	Sakari Jurkka	Minäkö isä!	I, a Father!
1954 (12th)	Heimo Lepistö	Ryysyrannan Jooseppi	Joseph of Ryysyranta
1955 (13th)	Not presented		
1956 (14th)	Not presented		
1957 (15th)	Not presented		
1958 (16th)	Holger Salin	Punainen viiva	Red Line
1959 not held	Not presented		
1960 not held	Not presented		
1961 (17th)	Helge Herala	Kultainen vasikka	The Golden Calf
1962 (18th)	Joel Rinne	Tähdet kertovat, komisario Palmu	The Stars Will Tell, Inspector Palmu
1963 (19th)	Matti Oravisto	Sissit	The Partisans
1964 not held	Not presented		
1965 (20th)	Pekka Autiovuori	Tunteita	Feelings
1966 (21st)	Jukka Sipilä	Käpy selän alla	Under Your Skin
1967 (22nd)	Not presented		
1968 (23rd)	Kalevi Kahra	Täällä Pohjantähden alla	Here, Beneath the North Star
1969 (24th)	Eero Melasniemi	Kesyttömät veljekset	The Brothers
1970 (25th)	Jussi Jurkka	Akseli ja Elina, Päämaja	Akseli and Elina, The Headquarters
1971–72 (26th)	Mikko Niskanen	Kahdeksan surmanluotia	Eight Deadly Shots
1972 (27th)	Not presented		
1973 (28th)	Aimo Saukko	Maa on syntinen laulu	The Earth Is a Sinful Song
1974 (29th)	Not presented		
1975 (30th)	Vesa-Matti Loiri; Antti Litja	Rakastunut rampa Mies, joka ei osannut sanoa ei	Cripple in Love; The Man Who Couldn't Say No
1976 (31st)	Erkki Pajala; Lasse Pöysti; Vilho Siivola	Manillaköysi; Pyhä perhe Luottamus	– The Holy Family; Trust
1977 (32nd)	Martti Kainulainen; Toivo Mäkelä	Pakolaiset; Aika hyvä ihmiseksi	– People Not as Bad as They Seem
1978 (33rd)	Not presented		
1979 (34th)	Lasse Pöysti	Herra Puntila ja hänen renkinsä Matti	Herr Puntila and His Servant Matti
1980 (35th)	Martti Kainulainen; Pertti Palo	Kätkäläinen; Yö meren rannalla	– Night by the Seashore
1981 (36th)	Hannu Lauri; Martti Pennanen	Pedon merkki Tie	Sign of the Beast –
1982 (37th)	Vesa-Matti Loiri; Kari Väänänen	Jon, Ulvova mylläri, Uuno Turhapuro menettää muistinsa Jon	Jon, Howling Miller, Numbskull Emptybrook Loses His Memory; Jon
1983 (38th)	Paavo Pentikäinen	Musta hurmio	–
1984 (39th)	Not presented		
1985 (40th)	Paavo Liski; Risto Tuorila	Tuntematon sotilas Tuntematon sotilas	The Unknown Soldier; The Unknown Soldier
1986 (41st)	Lasse Pöysti	Maailman paras	–
1987 (42nd)	Hannu Lauri	Jäähyväiset presidentille	Farewell, Mr. President
1988 (43rd)	Kari Sorvali	Kuutamosonaatti	The Moonlight Sonata
1989 (44th)	Taneli Mäkelä	Talvisota	The Winter War
1990 (45th)	Matti Pellonpää	Räpsy & Dolly eli Pariisi odottaa	Dolly and Her Lover
1991 (46th)	Silu Seppälä	Zombie ja Kummitusjuna	Zombie and the Ghost Train
1992 (47th)	Paavo Pentikäinen	Pilkkuja ja pikkuhousuja	Lyrics and Lace
1993 (48th)	Hannu Kivioja	Isä meidän	Pater Noster
1994 (49th)	Juha Veijonen	Esa ja Vesa – auringonlaskun ratsastajat	Sunset Riders
1995 (50th)	Not presented		
1996 (51st)	Jorma Tommila	Joulubileet	The Christmas Party
1997 (52nd)	Kari Heiskanen	Lunastus	The Redemption
1998 (53rd)	Pertti Koivula	Kuningasjätkä	A Summer by the River
1999 (54th)	Martti Suosalo	Kulkuri ja joutsen	The Swan and the Wanderer
2000 (55th)	Janne Reinikainen	Badding	Badding
2001 (56th)	Martti Suosalo	Rentun Ruusu	The Rose of the Rascal
2002 (57th)	Sulevi Peltola	Haaveiden kehä	Blue Corner
2003 (58th)	Mikko Leppilampi	Helmiä ja sikoja	Pearls and Pigs
2004 (59th)	Peter Franzén	Koirankynnen leikkaaja	Dog Nail Clipper
2005 (60th)	Hannu-Pekka Björkman	Eläville ja kuolleille	For the Living and the Dead
2006 (61st)	Janne Virtanen	Valkoinen kaupunki	Frozen City
2007 (62nd)	Tommi Korpela	Miehen työ	A Man's Work
2008 (63rd)	Tommi Korpela	Putoavia enkeleitä	Falling Angels
2009 (64th)	Heikki Nousiainen	Postia pappi Jaakobille	Letters to Father Jacob
2010 (65th)	Ville Virtanen	Paha perhe	Bad Family
2011 (66th)	Joonas Saartamo	Hiljaisuus	Silence
2012 (67th)	Eero Ritala	Kulman pojat	Fanatics
2013 (68th)	Eero Aho	8-pallo	8-ball
2014 (69th)	Antti Litja	Mielensäpahoittaja	The Grump
2015 (70th)	Tommi Korpela	Häiriötekijä	Distractions
2016 (71st)	Jarkko Lahti	Hymyilevä mies	The Happiest Day in the Life of Olli Mäki
2017 (72nd)	Eero Aho	Tuntematon sotilas	The Unknown Soldier
2018 (73rd)	Hannu-Pekka Björkman	Ihmisen osa	The Human Part
2019 (73rd)	Pekka Strang	Koirat eivät käytä housuja	Dogs Don't Wear Pants
2020 (74th)	Shahab Hosseini	Ensilumi	Any Day Now
2021 (75th)	Petri Poikolainen	Sokea mies, joka ei halunnut nähdä Titanicia	The Blind Man Who Did Not Want to See Titanic

== Multiple awards ==
3 awards

- Tommi Korpela (2 consecutive)
- Tauno Palo
- Lasse Pöysti

2 awards

- Eero Aho
- Hannu-Pekka Björkman
- Martti Kainulainen
- Hannu Lauri
- Vesa-Matti Loiri
- Paavo Pentikäinen
- Joel Rinne
- Martti Suosalo
- Rauli Tuomi
