= 4th Jussi Awards =

Finnish film awards ceremony in 1947

- Date: October 19, 1947
- Site: Restaurant Fennia; Helsinki, Finland

Highlights
- Most awards: Loviisa – Niskavuoren nuori emäntä (4)

The 4th Jussi Awards ceremony, presented by Elokuvajournalistit ry, honored the best Finnish films released between August 1, 1946 and July 31, 1947 and took place on October 19, 1947 at Restaurant Fennia in Helsinki. The Jussi Awards were presented in seven different categories, including Best Director, Best Cinematography, Best Short Film, Best Actor, Best Actress, Best Supporting Actor, and Best Supporting Actress.

== Awards ==
Best Director: Valentin Vaala – Loviisa – Niskavuoren nuori emäntä‡	Best Cinematography: Eino Heino – Loviisa – Niskavuoren nuori emäntä‡
Best Actor: Rauli Tuomi – Minä elän‡	Best Actress: Emma Väänänen – Loviisa – Niskavuoren nuori emäntä‡
Best Supporting Actor: Uuno Laakso – Kirkastuva sävel‡	Best Supporting Actress: Salli Karuna – Loviisa – Niskavuoren nuori emäntä‡
Best Short Film: Erik Blomberg and Eino Mäkinen – Porojen parissa‡
