= 1st Jussi Awards =

Finnish film awards ceremony in 1944

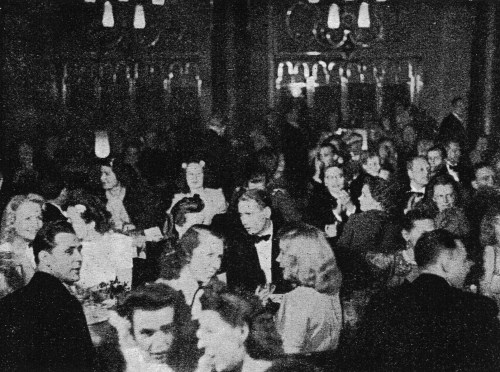
- The first Jussi Awards were held at Restaurant Adlon in Helsinki.
- Date: November 16, 1944
- Site: Restaurant Adlon; Helsinki, Finland

Highlights
- Most awards: Herra ja ylhäisyys (3)

The 1st Jussi Awards ceremony, presented by Elokuvajournalistit ry, honored the best Finnish films released between October 1, 1942, and September 30, 1944, and took place on November 16, 1944, at Restaurant Adlon in Helsinki. The Jussi Awards were presented in seven different categories, including Best Director, Best Cinematography, Best Production Design, Best Actor, Best Actress, Best Supporting Actor, and Best Supporting Actress.

== Awards ==
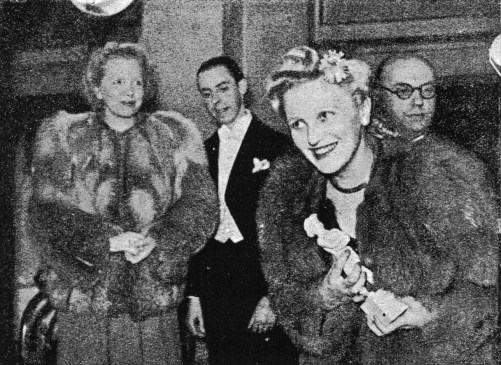
Ansa Ikonen receiving the first Jussi Award for Best Actress.

Best Director: Hannu Leminen – Valkoiset ruusut‡	Best Cinematography: Felix Forsman – Valkoiset ruusut‡
Best Actor: Joel Rinne – Kirkastettu sydän‡	Best Actress: Ansa Ikonen – Vaivaisukon morsian‡
Best Supporting Actor: Oiva Luhtala – Herra ja ylhäisyys‡	Best Supporting Actress: Kyllikki Väre – Herra ja ylhäisyys‡ and Vaivaisukon morsian‡
Best Production Design: Tapio "Roy" Vilpponen – Herra ja ylhäisyys‡
