= Olavi Reimas =

Olavi Reimas (born Unto Kalervo Eskola; 14 March 1914 − 9 June 1995) was a Finnish actor. He appeared in 19 films between 1938−1958. Most of them were directed by Valentin Vaala.

== Filmography ==
- Sysmäläinen (1938)
- Vihreä kulta (1939)
- Rikas tyttö (1939)
- Jumalan myrsky (1940)
- Morsian yllättää (1941)
- Antreas ja syntinen Jolanda (1941)
- Varaventtiili (1942)
- Neljä naista (1942)
- Tositarkoituksella (1943)
- Syntynyt terve tyttö (1943)
- Keinumorsian (1943)
- Suomisen Olli rakastuu (1944)
- Miesmalli (1944)
- Vain sinulle (1945)
- En ole kreivitär (1945)
- Synnin jäljet (1946)
- Maaret − tunturien tyttö (1947)
- Sinut minä tahdon (1949)
- Hyvää päivää Saarisen perhe (1958)
