= Eight Deadly Shots =

1972 Finnish film by Mikko Niskanen

- Poster
- Finnish: Kahdeksan surmanluotia
- Written by: Mikko Niskanen
- Directed by: Mikko Niskanen
- Starring: Mikko Niskanen
- Country of origin: Finland
- Original language: Finnish

Production
- Producer: Mikko Niskanen
- Running time: 316 minutes (miniseries)

Original release
- Network: Yleisradio
- Release: 29 March – 5 April 1972

Eight Deadly Shots (also known as Eight Fatal Shots; Finnish: Kahdeksan surmanluotia) is a Finnish drama film directed, written, produced by and starring Mikko Niskanen. Originally released as a four-part, five-hour miniseries in spring 1972, it was edited into a 145-minute movie by Jörn Donner. The film has generally been called Niskanen's "magnum opus".

== Plot ==
A Central Finnish smallholder, Pasi, tries to work odd jobs to provide for his family under meager conditions, but also starts moonshining with his friend Reiska and lapses into alcoholism. Pasi's wife is forced to endure and fear his drunken violence, and he repeatedly needs to be calmed by police.

Pasi's wife argues with him about his drinking, he is bothered by recurring physical pains and hangovers, and he develops a bad temper which starts to frighten his wife and children. His family is also humiliated as he gets into a fight, skips a sermon which he disrupts by shooting a gun outside, and is confronted by police who start visiting his home frequently. Pasi struggles to find work and is forced to sell his horse to pay his taxes. The film ends with a final outburst in which Pasi scares his family away and shoots after them with a rifle. When police arrive, Pasi shoots the officers dead, goes over to his neighbors' house and tells them to call the police chief. He is sentenced to life in prison.

== Production ==
The film was inspired by a 7 March 1969 mass shooting incident in Pihtipudas, Finland, in which a smallholder shot and killed four armed policemen who had come to calm him down after he drove his family out of the house in a drunken rage. The film focuses on depicting a fictionalised chain of events leading up to the killings, as imagined by director Niskanen, who personally knew the region where the events took place. The names of the characters were changed.

The production of the film experienced many setbacks. The mass shooting incident was still fresh in the memory and many strongly condemned the film project. In connection with the making of the film, there was almost a life-threatening situation when a bullet almost hit the cinematographer during a gun shooting scene. Both professional and amateur actors were used. Issues with the schedule and budget led executives at Yleisradio to seriously consider calling off the production, but this was averted.

== Cast ==
- Mikko Niskanen as Pasi
- Tarja-Tuulikki Tarsala as Pasi's wife
- Paavo Pentikäinen as Reiska
- Tauno Paananen as Tanu
- Elina Liimatainen as Ellu
- Ari Vainiontaus as Ari
- Mauno Argillander as Manu
- Sulo Hokkanen as Sulo Kokki
- Ilmari Piilonen as gamekeeper
- Yrjö Liehunen as shopkeeper
- Kalle Kellokangas as Kalle
- Olavi Tervahartiala as Taisto Kokki
- Kaarlo Wilska as preacher
- Harri Väreluoto as police chief
- Sakari Niskanen as policeman #1
- Sulo Olkkonen as policeman #2
- Jorma Lindfors as policeman #3
- Toivo Kähkönen as policeman #4
- Matti Nurminen as policeman #5
- Esko Nikkari as policeman #6
- Helinä Tevi as wife's sister
- Kari Franck as speaker from Helsinki
- Pertti Weckström as doctor
- Riku Rinkama as judge

== Reception ==
Eight Deadly Shots has often been considered one of the most esteemed Finnish movies. It was tied for "best Finnish movie" in a polling of film critics in 1992; in 2012, critics voted it the fifth-best Finnish movie. Niskanen won the Jussi Awards for both Best Director and Best Actor. Aki Kaurismäki described the longer, miniseries version as "one of the masterpieces of European cinema". Urho Kekkonen, the President of Finland at the time, also praised the film after watching it with Niskanen in a more than five-hour private screening.

Tauno Pasanen, the man who committed the real-life killings the film was based on, saw the movie in prison and commented on it: "This is so true that it makes me laugh and cry at times. That is how life was back there. My fate in life was so accurately portrayed that it is like ripped from my soul."

Writing in The Arts Fuse, David D'Arcy noted the influence of Robert Bresson in the film's depiction of Pasi's family life and treatment of his horse. D'Arcy also praised Tarja-Tuulikki Tarsala’s performance as the wife. In the Wall Street Journal, Kristin M. Jones wrote, "Niskanen’s writing and direction yielded a riveting story. His immersion into the part of Pasi—a character both ordinary and full of contradictions—makes it unforgettable. In Pasi’s most agonizing moments, such as after he drunkenly frightens his family, his face is a haunted mask."

== Restoration ==
In 2018, the film was selected as part of Martin Scorsese's World Cinema Project with the aim of reaching international distribution as a restored 35 mm screening copy and a digital 4K copy. The restored film was screened at the 2022 New York Film Festival.

== See also ==
- List of films considered the best
