= Eino Heino =

Finnish cinematographer (1912–1975)

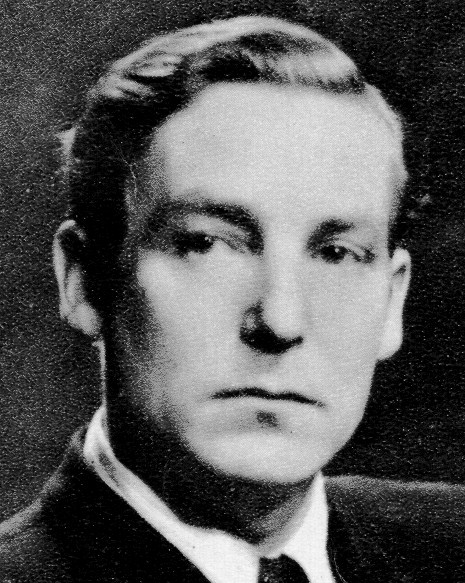

Eino Ilmari Heino (22 February 1912 – 10 May 1975) was a Finnish cinematographer. During his career, he received three Jussi Awards, two for feature films Linnaisten vihreä kamari (1945) and Loviisa – Niskavuoren nuori emäntä (1947) and one for a short film Jokapäiväistä leipäämme (1963).

Heino was married to actress Emma Väänänen.

== Selected filmography ==
- Kaikki rakastavat (1935)
- Koskenlaskijan morsian (1937)
- Juurakon Hulda (1937)
- Rikas tyttö (1939)
- In the Fields of Dreams (1940)
- Morsian yllättää (1941)
- Sellaisena kuin sinä minut halusit (1944)
- Linnaisten vihreä kamari (1945)
- Ihmiset suviyössä (1948)
- Omena putoaa (1952)
- Nummisuutarit (1957)
