= 3rd Jussi Awards =

Finnish film awards ceremony in 1946

- Date: November 1, 1946
- Site: Restaurant Fennia; Helsinki, Finland

Highlights
- Most awards: En ole kreivitär (2)

The 3rd Jussi Awards ceremony, presented by Elokuvajournalistit ry, honored the best Finnish films released between October 1, 1945 and July 31, 1946 and took place on November 1, 1946 at Restaurant Fennia in Helsinki. The Jussi Awards were presented in seven different categories, including Best Cinematography, Best Production Design, Best Actor, Best Actress, Best Supporting Actor, Best Supporting Actress, and Best Short Film. Additionally, a Special Jussi Award was given out for a young actor, and three Honorable Mentions were included at the ceremony.

== Awards ==
=== Jussi ===
Best Actor: Tauno Palo – Menneisyyden varjo‡	Best Actress: Regina Linnanheimo – Levoton veri and Rakkauden risti‡
Best Supporting Actor: Hannes Häyrinen – Nuoruus sumussa‡	Best Supporting Actress: Rauha Rentola – Vuokrasulhanen‡
Best Production Design: Hannu Leminen – En ole kreivitär‡	Best Cinematography: Marius Raichi – En ole kreivitär‡
Best Short Film: Brita Wrede and Felix Forsman – Lapin tuho‡

=== Special Jussi ===
Best Young Actor
- Lasse Pöysti ‡

=== Honorable Mention ===
Supporting Actress: Irja Rannikko – Houkutuslintu	Cinematography: Kalle Peronkoski – Menneisyyden varjo
Short Film: Yrjö Aaltonen – Syksy
