= Matti Schreck =

Finnish banker and film producer

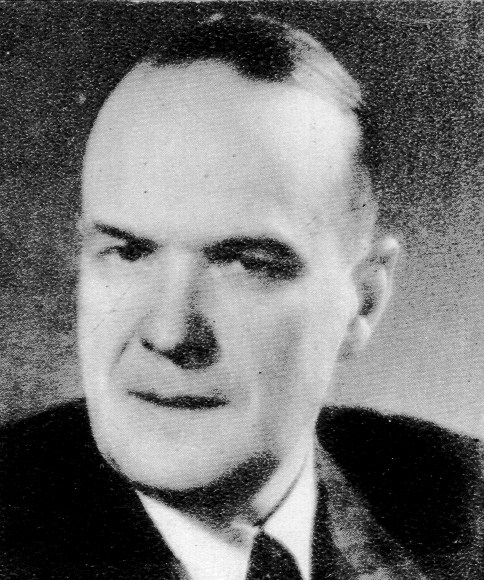

Georg Mathias "Matti" Schreck (19 December 1897 – 19 October 1946) was a Finnish banker and film producer. He produced a total of 50 films between 1935–1945.

== Selected filmography ==
- The Rapids-Rider's Brides (1937)
- Jääkärin morsian (1938)
- Rikas tyttö (1939)
- Jumalan myrsky (1940)
- Kirkastettu sydän (1943)
- The Dead Man Loses His Temper (1944)
- Linnaisten vihreä kamari (1945)
