= This Summer at Five =

1963 film

- Directed by: Erkko Kivikoski
- Written by: Erkko Kivikoski; Marja-Leena Mikkola; Juha Tanttu
- Starring: Martti Koski
- Cinematography: Virke Lehtinen
- Edited by: Anja Kivikoski
- Release date: 15 November 1963
- Running time: 75 minutes
- Country: Finland
- Language: Finnish

This Summer at Five (Finnish: Kesällä kello 5) is a 1963 Finnish drama film directed by Erkko Kivikoski. It was entered into the 14th Berlin International Film Festival.

== Cast ==
- Martti Koski - Juhani
- Tuula Elomaa - Ritva Järvinen
- Carita Gren - Dark-haired girl
- Pekka Juutilainen
- Päivi Kaasinen
- Milja Luukko - Nurse
- Pekka Sahenkari - Advertising man
- Kaarlo Wilska - Night guard at hospital
