= Virke Lehtinen =

Finnish film director, film producer, cinematographer and screenwriter (1940–2022)

- Born: 5 August 1940; Tampere, Finland
- Died: 4 June 2022 (aged 81); Helsinki, Finland
- Occupation(s): film director, producer, director of photography and screenwriter
- Awards: Silver Bear for Best Short Film (Berlin International Film Festival); 1962 Tori (film)

Virke Lehtinen (5 August 1940 – 4 June 2022) was a Finnish film director, film producer, actor and screenwriter.

He was also the main owner of Filmiryhmä Oy, a Finnish film production company which started in 1964.

== Career ==
Lehtinen's first breakthrough film project was the short film Tori (film) (The Market Place) in 1962. It was the incentive which gave the start for the careers of director Erkko Kivikoski, then 27 and cinematographer Virke Lehtinen, 22, with experienced editor Juho Gartz, then 30. Their film won Silver Bear for Best Short Film of the Berlin International Film Festival. Next year the trio made the feature Kesällä kello 5 (film) (This Summer at Five), which got an enormous popularity and personal awards for the trio and entered 14th Berlin International Film Festival.

Kivikoski and Gartz wanted to start a production company of their own, and they wanted Virke Lehtinen along, who had left for Paris. His aim was to study film making and hopefully enter Institut des hautes études cinématographiques (IDHEC). He could however not find the famous film school, but he was lucky to make acquaintance with some excellent film makers.

First and foremost Virke Lehtinen appreciated that director Jean-Paul Le Chanois gave the young film maker a great opportunity to accompany his working. This strengthened Lehtinen's professional attitude and his everlasting love for the French art of film making – and above all it made him understand the warm humanism Le Chanois had.

Lehtinen had to return to Helsinki because Kivikoski wanted a third success. The new film was a commercial flop, however. The trio started their common production company. They gave it the name Filmiryhmä Oy ("Film team") - because the name depicts their ideals of working as a team, and the name was modern then. Company didn't get any financing for a new feature, and when the trio tried to get financiers for their short films, it was falling into boycott of the big traditional production companies.

After one year Kivikoski and Gartz were bored of being producers, thus Virke Lehtinen was forced to stay alone to end a couple of started productions. He made his first short Onninen (film) (Mr Happy (film)) with the very talented and popular actor Leo Jokela in 1968. The script was by Lehtinen and Anssi Mänttäri. Onninen was shown on several festivals.

To keep his production company going, Lehtinen made partnerships with some banks and big industrial companies, and started some productions and some long time sponsor relations. He asked his old friend Aito Mäkinen, who ran the Finnish Film Archives (now National Audiovisual Institute (Finland)), to join the company. They produced a big number of shorts, even their first TV-documentary The Berlin Film Festival (documentary). In 1968 Mäkinen directed the first feature of the company Vain neljä kertaa (film), and in 1969 Virke Lehtinen directed in Lapland his first feature Muurahaispolku ("Path of ants”). It got the Finnish State Film Award.

Company started to get fame. It produced shorts and educational films. Their social documentary Silta (film) ("the Bridge") was awarded the best European industrial film. They made "The Finnish way” for Finnair, Marimekko (film) and in Lapland "Reindeer", which was awarded in Venice.

In 1975 Virke Lehtinen started to prepare a feature to be made in Lapland, ”Fires on the Arctic”. The project was interrupted, when the Filmiryhmä company was offered a location for a cinema. It got the name Diana. Even before its opening Filmiryhmä was in boycott: big cinema companies didn't accept the new player to the market, not even a small art house cinema. Big companies imported traditional films, and they could make agreements with the American distributors, who needed more cinema chains than a single small cinema. Lehtinen and Mäkinen decided to import own films for Diana. Then, the other cinemas around Finland didn't show the films of Diana. Lehtinen and Mäkinen were forced to open other own cinemas, by the names Diana and Amanda.

During 15 years Diana imported art house films, cinema classics and modern films. It introduced Finland to new film countries and both established and new directors. There were more than 80 French films, the Japanese film culture was presented with more than 30 films. Totally, the company imported more than 200 films from around the world. Also, they showed every independent Finnish film, even on 16 mm. Diana created a new film culture in Finland. It had a faithful audience which grew bigger and bigger.

At that time in Finland, there were no organizations or film foundations to support cinema culture. To be able to import new films for the small cinemas - all between 85 and 180 seats, and to pay the advertising and marketing, Virke Lehtinen was forced to travel around Finland and beyond. He made a big number of documentaries, like Work (short film) Työ which won the main award at Chicago International Film Festival. At that time, Lehtinen's second feature Kolme miestä (film) ("Three men"), script by Lehtinen and Solja Kievari, was shot in Lapland. The dream of the film project ”Fires” was pushed forward, again.

Diana cinemas, which started in 1976 by the film of Bertrand Tavernier, Que la fête commence (Let Joy Reign Supreme) were closed in 1992 by the remarkable film of Louis Malle, Au revoir les enfants (Goodbye, Children). One of the most beautiful periods of the Finnish cinema culture was over. From that golden period of film, Mäkinen and Lehtinen made a beautiful documentary Public Shadows (documentary).

In the same year when Virke Lehtinen ended Diana, he presented at the International Documentary Film Festival Amsterdam IDFA his project ”Fires”, now as documentary. The reception was so overwhelming, that he decided to make his ”Fires” as feature as he previously planned.

Planning and writing take time, collecting financing takes time. His latest documentary Hazards (documentary), 2013, has been shown on many international festivals, starting in Leipzig 2013. Lehtinen finally worked with his project "Fires".
