= Leminen =

Leminen is a Finnish surname. Notable people with the surname include:

- Hannu Leminen (1910–1997), Finnish film director, set designer, screenwriter, and broadcasting executive
- Markus Leminen (born 1995), Finnish figure skater and coach
