= Kersti Bergroth =

Finnish author and playwright

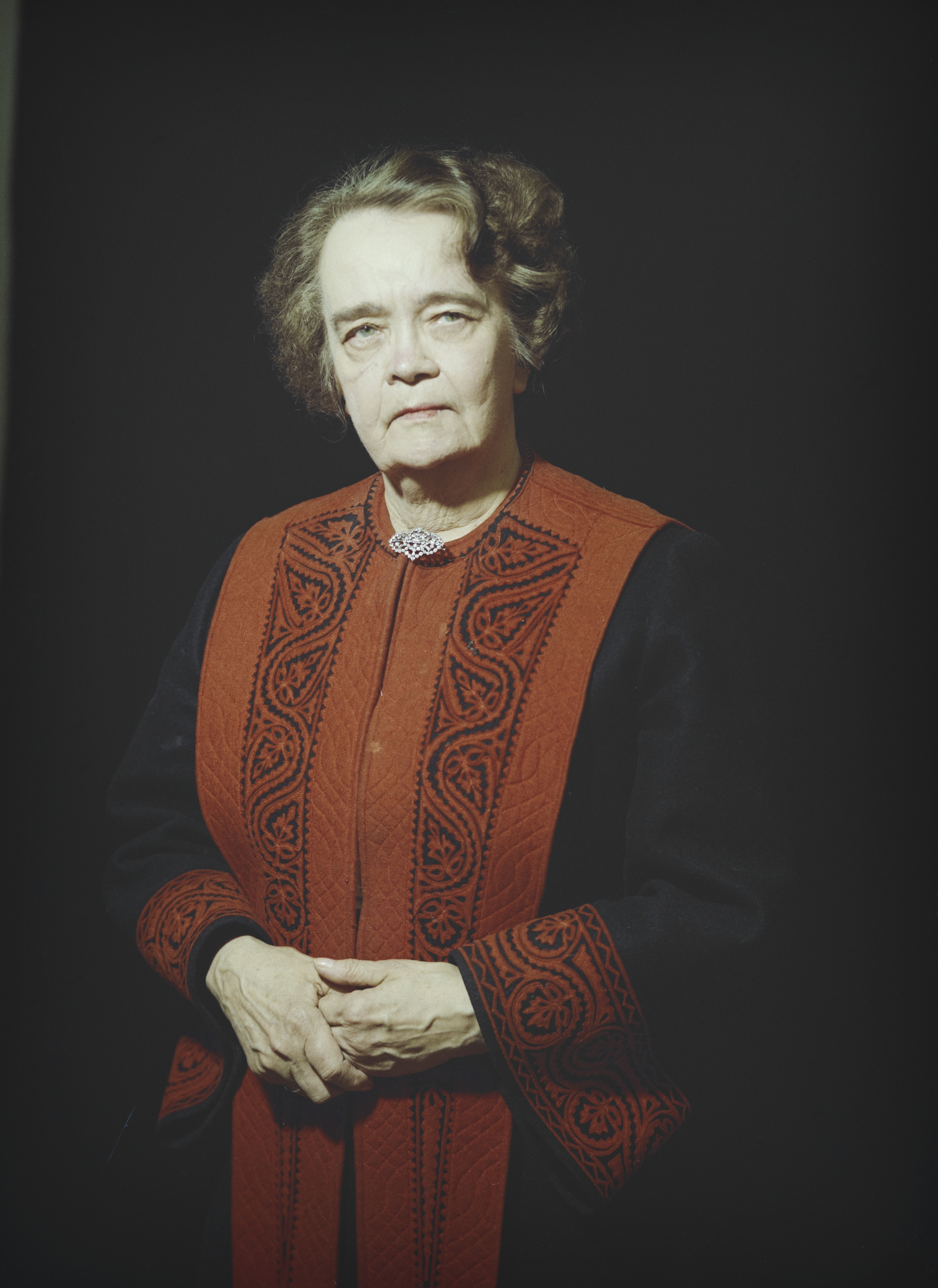
Kersti Bergroth in 1960.

Kersti Solveig Bergroth (24 January 1886 – 24 January 1975) was a Finnish author and playwright.

== Career ==
Bergroth was known to have been linguistically gifted. She wrote in Swedish until 1920, translated English and French literature to Finnish and also spoke German. She is best remembered for having written popular plays Anu ja Mikko and Kuparsaare Antti using a Karelian dialect. During her career, she released around 70 books, including novels, memoirs, children's stories and poems.

Bergroth was also noted for collaborating five times with film director Valentin Vaala. Using the pseudonym Tet, she wrote the film scripts for Morsian yllättää (1941), Tositarkoituksella (1943), Dynamiittityttö (1944), Vuokrasulhanen (1945) and Viikon tyttö (1946). All of those films were light-hearted comedies starring the actress Lea Joutseno.

== Later life ==
The post-war generation of new authors did not appreciate Kersti Bergroth's work, and she received negative reviews for some of her later releases. In the early 1950s, she moved to Rome, Italy, although still frequently visiting her homeland. Bergroth returned to Finland in the early 1970s, and died on her 89th birthday on 24 January 1975 in Helsinki.
