= Volanen =

Volanen is a Finnish surname. Notable people with the surname include:

- Eeva-Kaarina Volanen (1921–1999), Finnish actress
- Jani Volanen (born 1971), Finnish actor, writer, and director
