= Under Your Skin (film) =

Käpy selän alla
- Original Finnish film poster
- Directed by: Mikko Niskanen
- Written by: Marja-Leena Mikkola
- Produced by: Kyösti Varesvuo
- Starring: Kirsti Wallasvaara; Eero Melasniemi; Kristiina Halkola; Pekka Autiovuori
- Cinematography: Esko Nevalainen
- Edited by: Juho Gartz
- Music by: Kaj Chydenius; Otto Donner
- Production company: FJ-Filmi
- Release date: 21 October 1966
- Country: Finland
- Language: Finnish
- Budget: 352,400 mk

Under Your Skin (Finnish: Käpy selän alla) is a 1966 Finnish film directed by Mikko Niskanen and written by Marja-Leena Mikkola. It stars Kirsti Wallasvaara, Eero Melasniemi, Kristiina Halkola and Pekka Autiovuori as four young adults who are camping in the woods.

Under Your Skin was the highest-grossing film in Finland since The Unknown Soldier. In addition, it won six Jussi Awards.

== Plot ==
Four young students, Riitta, Santtu, Leena and Timo, go camping on the shore of the lake. Riitta and Santtu flirt openly, while Leena is reserved about Timo's approach. During the trip, Leena and Santtu discuss life in depth and Santtu believes that he can help Leena to liberate herself sexually. Leena and Santtu make love in the forest, which causes conflicts.

== Cast ==
- Kristiina Halkola as Riitta
- Kirsti Wallasvaara as Leena
- Pekka Autiovuori as Timo
- Eero Melasniemi as Santtu
- Anneli Sauli as a film star
- Kasperi Manninen as Kasperi Lauhanen
- Alma Manninen as Alma Lauhanen
- Jukka Sipilä as Janne Lauhanen

The performers in the film include, among others, the Finnish rock band The Creatures with vocalist Kirka Babitzin. Director Mikko Niskanen makes also a cameo role as a man asking Leena to dance.
