= Helena Kara =

Finnish actress (1916–2002)

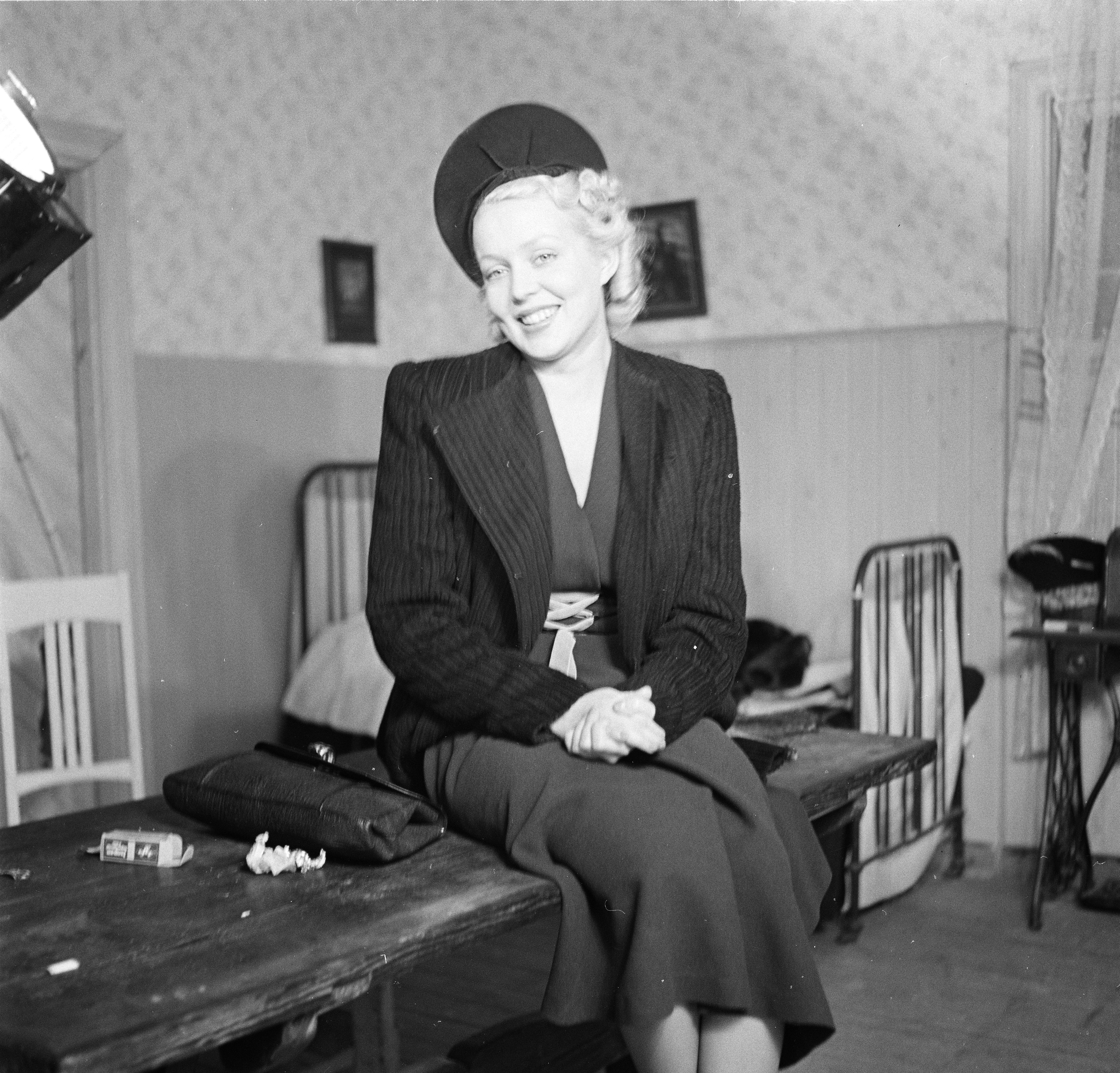
Kara in 1939

Aini Helena Kara (originally Aini Helena Dahl, 16 August 1916 – 26 February 2002) was a Finnish film actress. Like Lea Joutseno and Regina Linnanheimo, she was one of the few Finnish film actors without a theatrical background. Kara is best remembered for her role in a 1943 melodrama Valkoiset ruusut.

== Childhood and early life ==
Helena Kara was born in Salo into a family of four children. Until 1927, her family name was Dahl. While working as a ticket vendor in a Turku cinema in 1937, she met the head of Suomi-Filmi production company, Risto Orko, who invited her for a screen test. She soon appeared in her first film, Miehen kylkiluu (1937), directed by Orvo Saarikivi.

== Marriage and later life ==
Kara married director Hannu Leminen (1910–1997) on 10 February 1940, and their marriage lasted until Leminen's death. They had three children together. Kara and Leminen also made 12 films together. After getting married, Kara only appeared three times in films that were not directed by her husband. Valkoiset ruusut (1943) is generally considered to be the highlight of their work together.

Helena Kara has stated that an accident was the main reason for her giving up the film business after the 1952 film Hän tuli ikkunasta. A dog bit her in the face so that a visible scar was left. She did not want to be in films anymore. For decades, she shied away from all publicity. In the 1990s, she appeared in a television document capturing her life, and in 2002 she died at the age of 85. In their retirement years, Kara and her husband lived winters in the Algarve of Portugal and summers in Klaukkala near the Lake Valkjärvi.

== Filmography ==
- Miehen kylkiluu (1937)
- Poikamiesten holhokki (1938)
- Hätävara (1939)
- Punahousut (1939)
- Aktivistit (1939)
- Kyökin puolella (1940)
- Poikani pääkonsuli (1940)
- Neljä naista (1942)
- Puck (1942)
- Valkoiset ruusut (1943)
- Tuomari Martta(1943)
- Suurin voitto (1944)
- Sylvi (1944)
- Anja tule kotiin (1944)
- En ole kreivitär (1945)
- Vain sinulle (1945)
- Hedelmätön puu (1947)
- Tuhottu nuoruus (1947)
- Soita minulle, Helena! (1948)
- Rosvo-Roope (1949)
- Tapahtui kaukana (1950)
- Ratavartijan kaunis Inkeri (1950)
- Hän tuli ikkunasta (1952)

== Sources ==
- Laine, Kimmo & Seitajärvi, Juha (eds.): Valkoiset ruusut: Hannu Lemisen & Helena Karan elämä ja elokuvat. Suomalaisen Kirjallisuuden Seura, 2008. ISBN 978-952-222-001-1
- Kansallinen audiovisuaalinen arkisto: Helena Kara in memoriam. Retrieved 2013-01-27.
- Helena Kara's obituary. Helsingin Sanomat, 26 February 2002. Retrieved 2019-02-06. (In Finnish.)
- Helena Kara at Elonet.fi. Retrieved 2019-02-06.
