= Tauno Tattari =

Journalist and screenwriter (born 1907)

- Born: 25 April 1907; Alatornio, Finland
- Died: 20 April 1936 (aged 28)
- Occupation: Writer
- Years active: 1934-1936 (film)

Tauno Tattari (1907–1936) was a Finnish journalist and screenwriter.

== Selected filmography ==
- Substitute Wife (1936)
- The Rapids-Rider's Brides (1937 film)

== Bibliography ==
- Pietari Kääpä. Directory of World Cinema: Finland. Intellect Books, 2012.
