= Almost 18 =

- Theatrical poster
- Finnish: Kohta 18
- Directed by: Maarit Lalli
- Written by: Maarit Lalli, Henrik Mäki-Tanila
- Produced by: Maarit Lalli
- Starring: Karim Al-Rifai; Arttu Lähteenmäki; Henrik Mäki-Tanila; Anton Thompson Coon; Ben Thompson Coon
- Cinematography: Jan Nyman, Maarit Lalli, Harri Räty
- Edited by: Jenny Tervakari, Maarit Lalli
- Music by: Kepa Lehtinen
- Production company: Huh huh -filmi Oy
- Distributed by: Oy Nordisk Film Ab
- Release date: 9 March 2012
- Running time: 110 minutes
- Country: Finland
- Language: Finnish

Almost 18 (Finnish: Kohta 18) is a 2012 Finnish film. It is the first feature film by director Maarit Lalli who also wrote the screenplay with her son Henrik Mäki-Tanila, one of the main actors in the film.

== Plot ==
Kohta 18 tells six stories of five teenage boys on the edge of adulthood. Karri, Pete, André, Akseli and Joni are dealing with same issues as every other young man; fears and hopes for future, disillusions and problems with parents. Henrik Mäki-Tanila has said that some parts of the stories are taken from his own experiences as a teenager, as well as from the lives of his friends.

== Reception ==
The film has received mixed to positive reviews. Some critics have not been impressed by the work of mostly amateur cast, while others have complimented Lalli for creating a genuinely honest and authentic portrait of what it is to be a young adult in Finland in 2012.

Harri Närhi of City noticed that the filmmakers are in love with their characters and are therefore making the viewer feel the same way. Tarmo Poussu of Ilta-Sanomat was more reserved, writing that while the film is creating believable situations, it fails to expand them into stories.

On 3 February 2012, Kohta 18 received three Jussi Awards; for best film, best director and best screenplay.

== Cast ==
- Karim Al-Rifai as André
- Arttu Lähteenmäki as Akseli
- Henrik Mäki-Tanila as Karri
- Anton Thompson Coon as Pete
- Ben Thompson Coon as Joni
- Elina Knihtilä as Karri's mother
- Ilari Johansson as Akseli's father
- Niina Nurminen as Joni's mother
- Mats Långbacka as Joni's stepfather
- Mari Perankoski as André's mother
- Hannu-Pekka Björkman as Pete's father
- Tarja Heinula as Pete's mother
