= Janne Virtanen (actor) =

Finnish actor (born 1967)

Janne Asseri Virtanen (born 1967 in Raisio) is a Finnish actor best known for his supporting role as Robert Degerman in the Finnish nordic noir series Bordertown, having won a Jussi Award for Best Actor in 2007 for the film Frozen City.

Virtanen was married to Hanna-Riikka Siitonen until her death from cancer in 2018. Virtanen and Siitonen have a daughter born in 2006. The whole family acted in YLE drama series Uusi päivä which Janne also directed.
