= Rauni Ikäheimo =

Finnish actress

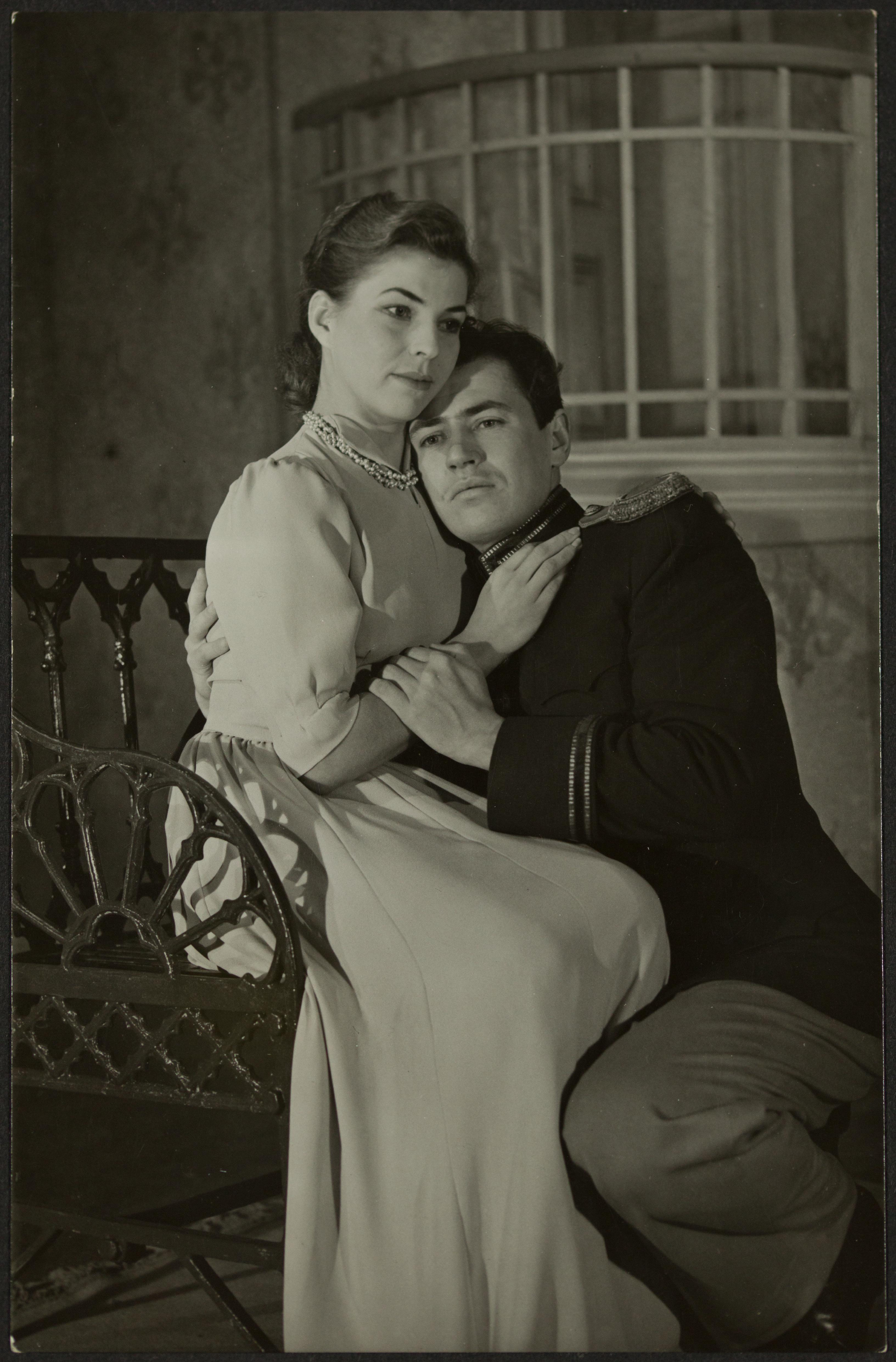
- Rauni Ikäheimo and Sakari Jurkka.
- Born: 21 July 1924; Tainionkoski, Finland
- Died: 28 July 1997 (aged 73)
- Occupation: Actress
- Years active: 1951-1993

Rauni Ikäheimo (21 July 1924 – 28 July 1997) was a Finnish film actress. She appeared in twelve films between 1951 and 1993.

== Selected filmography ==
- The Harvest Month (1956)
- Uuno Turhapuro (1973)
