= Sirkka Sari =

Finnish actress (1920–1939)

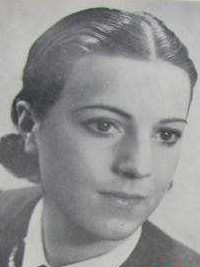
- Born: Sirkka Linnéa Jahnsson; 1 May 1920; Raivola, Finland (now Roshchino, Russia)
- Died: 30 July 1939 (aged 19); Aulanko, Hämeenlinna, Finland
- Cause of death: Internal bleeding and cardiac arrest
- Occupation: Actress
- Years active: 1938–1939

Sirkka Sari (born Sirkka Linnéa Jahnsson; 1 May 1920 – 30 July 1939) was a Finnish actress.

On 30 July 1939, Sirkka attended a party with the rest of the cast and crew of Rikas tyttö, her third and last film, while shooting at the Aulanko Hotel in Hämeenlinna; the party had been her idea. She and one of the men in the group went up to the roof of the hotel; on the flat roof, there was a chimney almost 30 metres (98 ft) high, with a ladder leading up to the top. Mistaking this chimney for a scenery balcony, she climbed up, but fell down inside into a heating boiler's furnace, dying instantly of internal bleeding and cardiac arrest. Because of her death, the end of the film had to be altered; the crew shot further away and another woman replaced Sari on these final shots.

Sirkka Sari was buried in the churchyard at Perkjärvi in her native Karelia. Both the church and the cemetery were destroyed in the Winter War the following year, and the area was thereafter annexed by the Soviet Union. Today the territory is part of Russia, and attempts to locate her grave since the end of the Cold War have so far been unsuccessful.

== Filmography ==
- Niskavuoren naiset (1938)
- Sysmäläinen (1938)
- Rikas tyttö (1939)

== See also ==
- List of unusual deaths in the 20th century
