= The Rapids-Rider's Brides (1937 film) =

Koskenlaskijan morsian
- Directed by: Valentin Vaala
- Written by: Tauno Tattari; Jukka Ahuva
- Based on: Koskenlaskijan morsian by Väinö Kataja (1914)
- Produced by: Matti Schreck
- Starring: Jalmari Rinne; Ansa Ikonen; Eino Jurkka; Tauno Palo
- Cinematography: Theodor Luts
- Edited by: Valentin Vaala
- Music by: Harry Bergström
- Production company: Suomi-Filmi
- Release date: 1937
- Running time: 83 minutes
- Country: Finland
- Language: Finnish

The Rapids-Rider's Brides (Finnish: Koskenlaskijan morsian is a 1937 Finnish drama film directed by Valentin Vaala, based on the novel Koskenlaskijan morsian by Väinö Kataja. The film features themes of family feuds, love, and conflicts between log drivers and farmers. Key scenes, including the dramatic log-driving sequences, were filmed at the Mankala Rapids in Iitti, with stunt doubles used for safety.

== Plot ==
Set in the late 19th century in the Torne River Valley, the film depicts tensions between two neighboring families. Paloniemi's patriarch, Heikki, faces financial struggles and decides to arrange a marriage between his son, Juhani, and Hanna, the heir to the prosperous Nuottaniemi estate. However, an earlier accident that caused the death of Nuottaniemi's son creates distrust. Hanna seeks to reconcile the families while navigating her own feelings.

== Reception ==
Upon its television release, critics praised the film's action sequences and director Vaala's ability to use natural symbolism effectively. Known for his comedic works, Vaala successfully transitioned to serious drama, delivering a strong rural narrative. The film's portrayal of religion, especially through the character Kero-Pieti (played by Ossi Elstelä), was particularly noted for its emotional depth.

== Cast ==
- Jalmari Rinne — Iisakki, Nuottaniemi's patriarch
- Ansa Ikonen — Hanna, heir to Nuottaniemi
- Eino Heino — Niilo, Iisakki's son
- Eino Jurkka — Heikki, Paloniemi's patriarch
- Tauno Palo — Juhani, Heikki's son
- Anton Soini — Koskenalusta's patriarch
- Kaarlo Kytö — Antti, Koskenalusta's son
- Ossi Elstelä — Kero-Pieti, preacher
- Vilho Auvinen — Kulku-Matti
- Elli Ylimaa — Maija, Iisakki's wife
