= Viipurin Lauluveikot =

Men's choir in Finland

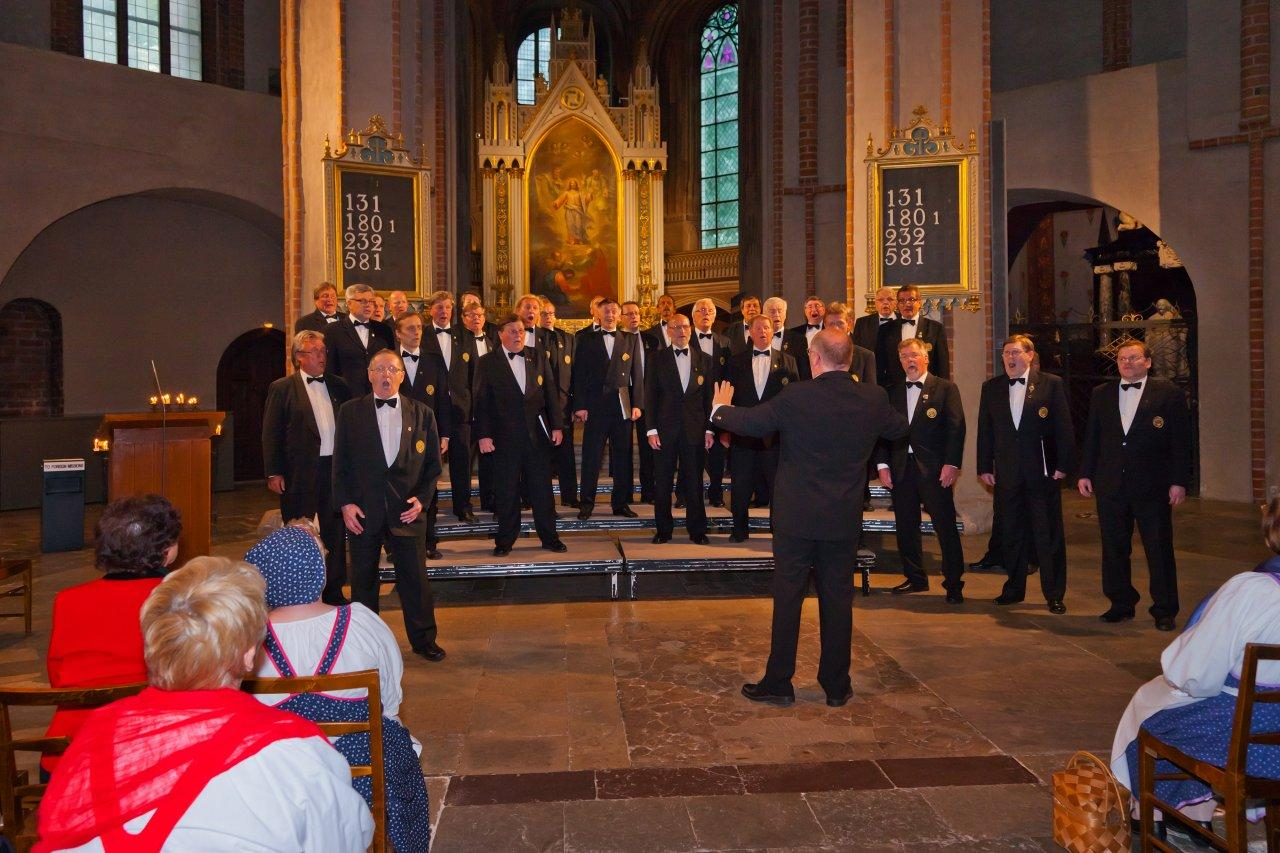
Vlvkuoro

Viipurin Lauluveikot is a Finnish male choir that was founded in Viipuri in 1897 and is one of the oldest men's choirs still active in Finland. After the Second World War, the choir moved from Viipuri to Helsinki because Viipuri had been ceded to the Soviet Union.

Many prominent composers and conductors and soloists have worked with Viipurin Lauluveikot. The honorary marches of Viipurin Lauluveikot were composed by Jean Sibelius in 1920 (named Kunniamarssi 1921) and 1929. Sibelius was later named as an honorary member of the choir. Viipurin Lauluveikot performs the compositions of Jean Sibelius, Oskar Merikanto and Felix Krohn, and of Bach, Lowel Manson, Händel and Beethoven for instance.

The choir is very active both in Finland and abroad. It has visited for example England, Japan, Hungary, Lithuania, China and the USA. In 2012 the choir had a 115-years anniversary tour to the previous hometown Viipuri and to St Peterburg, Russia.

One of the traditional concerts is the First Advent Sunday concert in the Johanneksenkirkko church in Helsinki. The choir performs every year in the National Independence day flagging ceremony on the sixth of December in Helsinki at Tähtitorninmäki 9.00 a.m. local time. Radio transmission of the event is sent worldwide by Finnish Broadcasting company YLE. This ceremony is the beginning of the Finnish independence day every year.

== Discography ==
- Karjalani, Karjalani ... Fuga 9333 (2012)
- Isänmaalle laulamme (2010)
- Yhä kohoaa tuttu torni (2007)
- Te luulette meidän unohtaneen ... (2005)
- Adventin aikaa (2003)
- Viipurin lauluveikot 100-vuotta (1997)
- Kohottakaa riemuhuuto (1997)
- Käyn Luojalle laulamaan (1992)
- Oomme Karjalaa muistelleet (1984)
- Laatokka (1975)
- Joulu- ja hengellisiä lauluja (1970)
