= Tree Without Fruit =

- Directed by: Hannu Leminen
- Written by: Unto Koskela (novels); Hannu Leminen; Ilmari Unho
- Produced by: T.J. Särkkä
- Starring: Helena Kara; Rauli Tuomi; Joel Rinne
- Cinematography: Kalle Peronkoski
- Edited by: Hannu Leminen
- Music by: Harry Bergström
- Production company: Suomen Filmiteollisuus
- Distributed by: Suomen Filmiteollisuus
- Release date: 21 March 1947
- Running time: 84 minutes
- Country: Finland
- Language: Finnish

Tree Without Fruit (Finnish: Hedelmätön puu) is a 1947 Finnish drama film directed by Hannu Leminen and starring Helena Kara, Rauli Tuomi and Joel Rinne.

== Cast ==
- Helena Kara as Helena Tyrni
- Rauli Tuomi as Erkki Tyrni
- Joel Rinne as Tauno Sysikorpi
- Rauha Rentola as Maija Raivio
- Emma Väänänen as Hanna Palonen
- Aino Lohikoski as Erkki's mother
- Salli Karuna as Helena's mother
- Enni Rekola as Mrs. Sandman
- Elli Ylimaa as Ms. Lindgren
- Matti Aulos as Antero Palonen
- Arvi Tuomi as Harjula
- Pentti Viljanen as Suomela
- Ossi Elstelä as Peltonen
- Uuno Montonen as Erkki's father
- Sven Relander as Gynecologist
- Mej-Ling Axberg as Hilkka
- Irja Kuusla as Nurse
- Lauri Kyöstilä as Doorman
- Topo Leistelä
- Ida Salmi as Head nurse
- Annika Sipilä as Annika Palonen
- Veikko Sorsakivi as Newspaperman
- Elsa Turakainen as Mrs. Nilsson
- William Reunanen as Man in hotel lobby
- Urho Seppälä as Newspaperman
- Kauko Vuorensola as Lift boy

== Bibliography ==
- Kari Uusitalo. T. J. Särkkä: legenda jo eläesään. WSOY, 1975.
