= Maarit Lalli =

Finnish film director (born 1964)

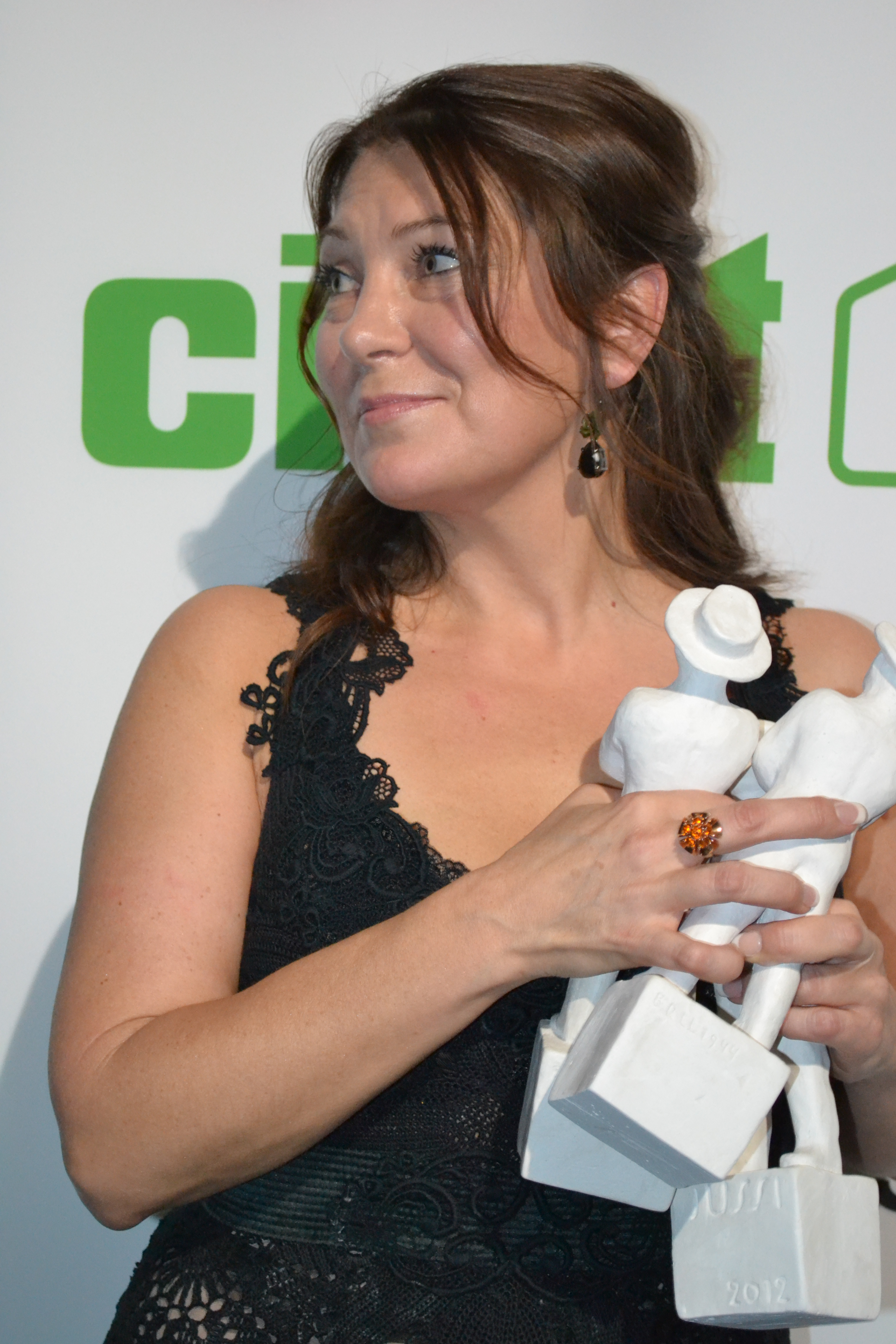
Lalli on 3 February 2012 with her three Jussi Awards for Kohta 18

Maarit Lalli (born 4 April 1964) is a Finnish film director, film producer and screenwriter.

== Career ==
On 3 February 2012, Lalli won three Jussi Awards for her first feature film Kohta 18 (2012); for Best Film, Best Director and Best Screenplay. Lalli wrote the screenplay with her son Henrik Mäki-Tanila who is also one of the main actors in the film. Her second film Kuudes kerta was released in January 2017.

== Filmography ==
=== Films ===
- Kohta 18 (2012)
- Kuudes kerta (2017)

=== Short films ===
- Suojaviiva (1995)
- Legio (1997)
- Rippeitä (1999)
- Kovat miehet (1999)
- Saaren vangit (2002)
- Järvi (2006)
- Keinu kanssain (2009)

=== On television ===
- Tie Eedeniin (2003)
- Käenpesä (2005–2006)
- Sydänjää (2007–2010)
- Mobile 101 (2022)
