= Felix Krohn =

Finnish conductor and composer

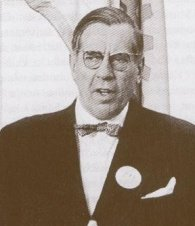
Krohn circa 1950

Felix Julius Theofil Krohn (20 May 1898 – 8 November 1963) was a Finnish conductor and composer. Krohn wrote several choral works and solo songs, but also stage and film music. As a composer, Krohn has been characterized as a sensitive romantic.

Felix Krohn was the conductor of the Finnish male choir Viipurin Lauluveikot 1929–1933 and 1941–1942.

== Filmography ==
- Sysmäläinen (1938)
- Vihreä kulta (1939)
- Anu ja Mikko (1940)
- Linnaisten vihreä kamari (1945)
