= Senni Nieminen =

Finnish actress (1905–1970)

- Born: Xenia Aleksandra Mäkelä; 21 March 1905
- Died: 28 July 1970 (aged 65)

Senni Nieminen (also known as Senni Lehto, originally Xenia Aleksandra Mäkelä; 21 March 1905 – 28 July 1970) was a Finnish actress. She worked in theatres while also appearing in films and on television.

== Selected filmography ==
- Miehen vankina (1943)
- Kuisma ja Helinä (1951)
- Omena putoaa (1952)
- Kun on tunteet (1954)
- Elokuu (1956)
- Nuori mylläri (1958)
- Nuoruus vauhdissa (1961)
- Asfalttilampaat (1968)
