= Rauni Luoma =

Finnish actress (1911–1996)

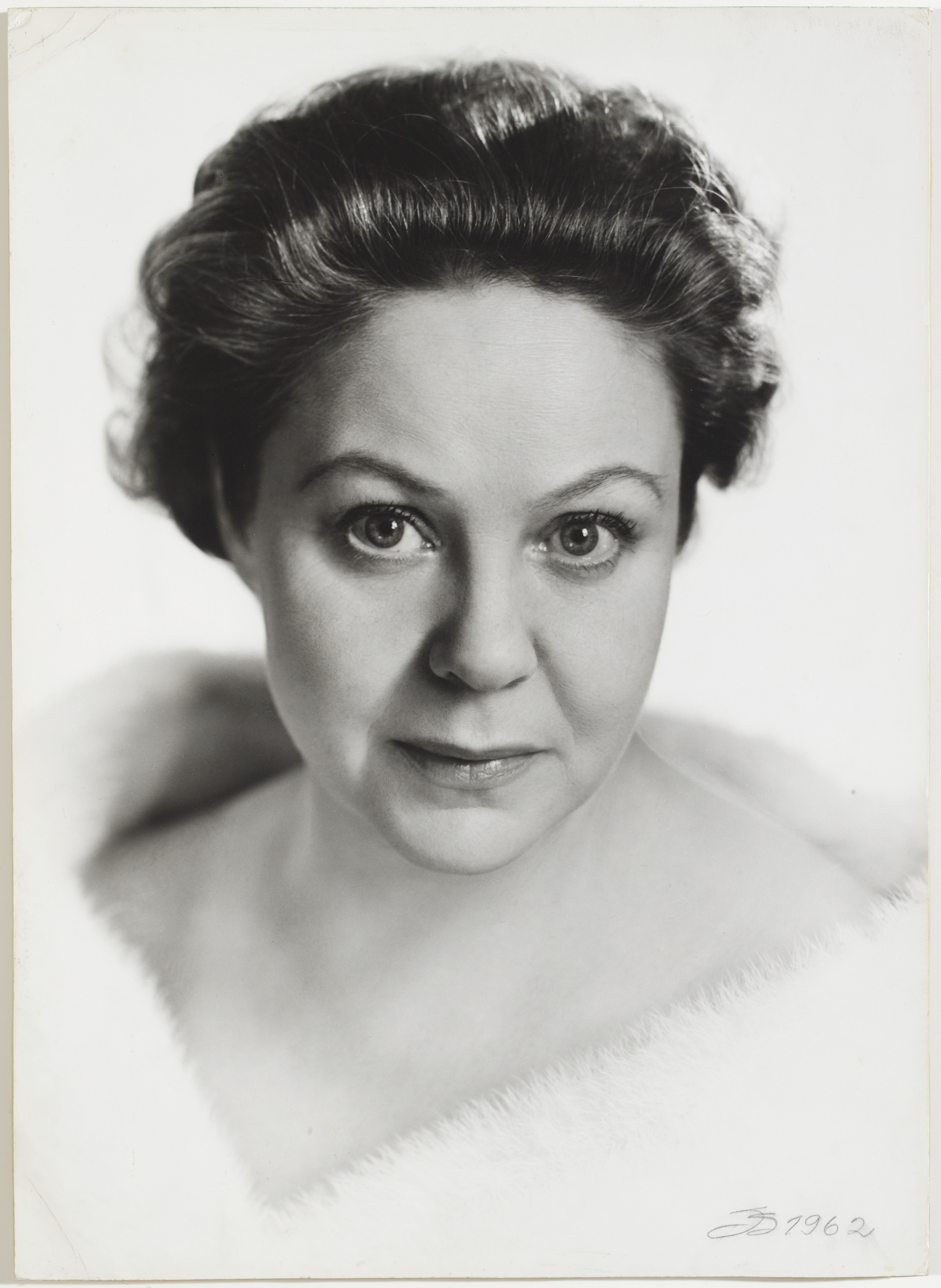
- Born: 15 October 1911; Helsinki, Finland
- Died: 12 January 1996 (aged 84); Helsinki
- Occupation: Actress
- Years active: 1934–1984
- Employer(s): Tampere Workers' Theatre; Finnish National Theatre

Rauni Maria Erika Luoma-Ervi (15 October 1911 – 12 January 1996) was a Finnish actress. Her career peaked at the Finnish National Theatre in 1955–1978. She also appeared in 25 films between 1935 and 1984.

== Selected filmography ==
- A Night in Rio (1956)
- The Harvest Month (1956)
