= Eeva-Kaarina Volanen =

Finnish actress (1921–1999)

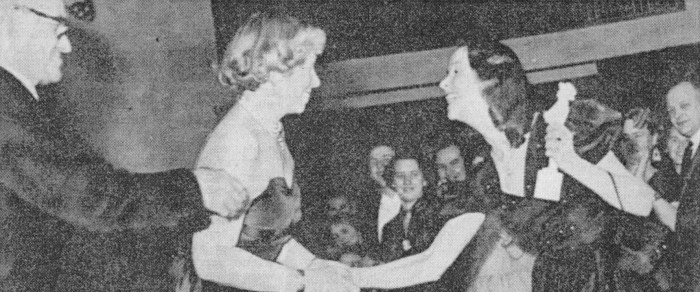
Jussi Award 1950. Journalist, singer and actress Annikki Arni (left) has handed Jussi Award to actress Eeva-Kaarina Volanen

Eeva-Kaarina Volanen (January 15, 1921 Kuusankoski – January 29, 1999 Helsinki) was a Finnish actress. She worked at the Finnish National Theatre for 45 years (1945–1990). Her husband was professor Sakari Puurunen (July 25, 1921 Iisalmi – August 5, 2000 Helsinki). They had no children.

Volanen died suddenly in 1999, at age 78.

== Awards ==
- Jussi Award four times: three times as best actress, in 1948, 1949, and 1950, and in 1992 she received a Lifetime achievement Jussi Award.
- Pro Finlandia medal of the Order of the Lion of Finland in 1966.
- Ida Aalberg award.

== Filmography ==
- Synnin jäljet (1946)
- "Minä elän" (1946)
- Suopursu kukkii (1947)
- Naiskohtaloita (1947)
- Toukokuun taika (1948)
- Ruma Elsa (1949)
- Prinsessa Ruusunen (1949)
- Katupeilin takana (1949)
- Katarina kaunis leski (1950)
- Hallin Janne (1950)
- Kesäillan valssi (1951)
- Shamrock (1953)
- Onnelliset (1954)
- Kun on tunteet (1954)
- Musta rakkaus (1957)
- Pala valkoista marmoria (1998)
