= Tea Ista =

Finnish actress (1932–2014)

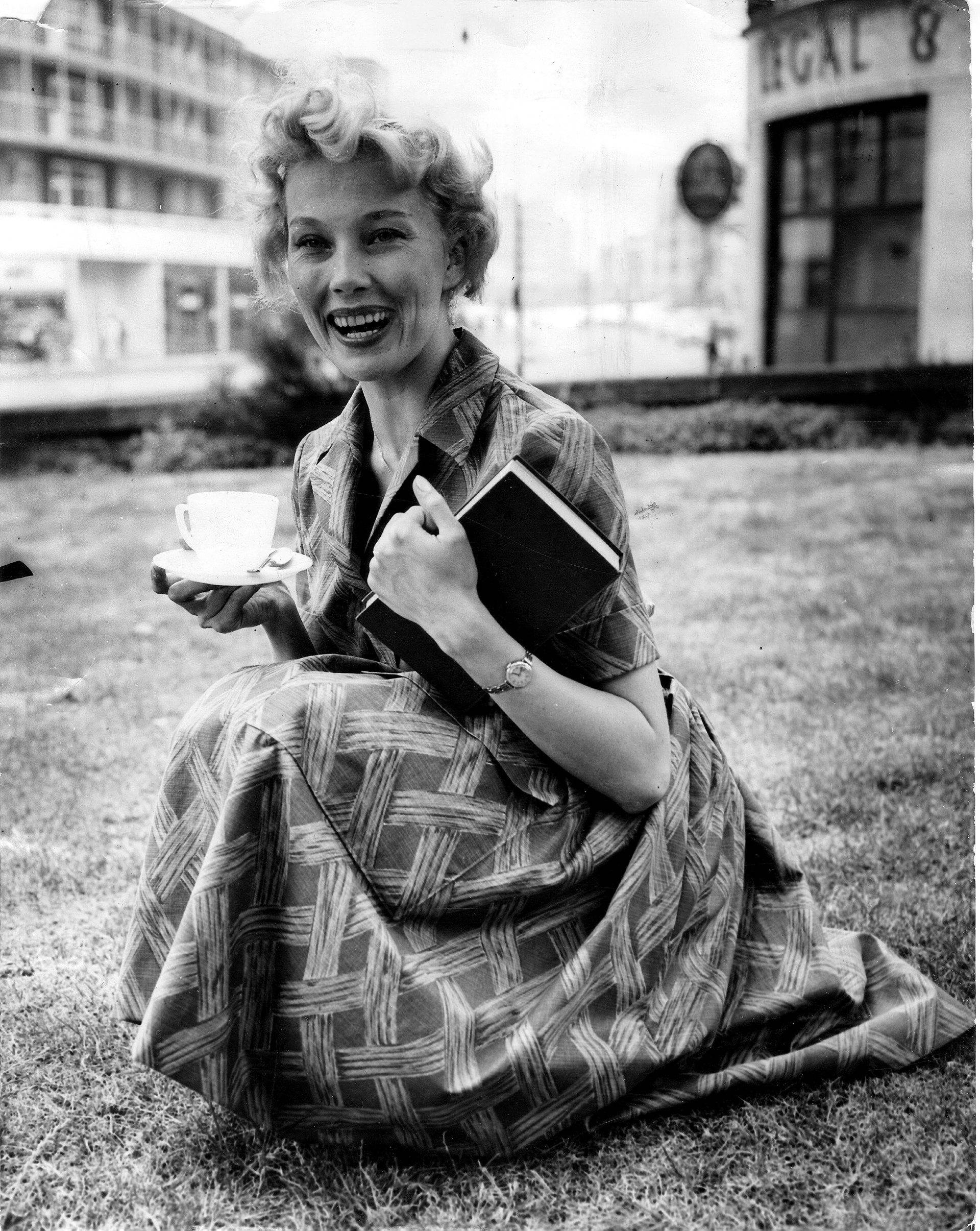
Tea Ista in 1959.

Dorothea Ida Eveliina Witikka (born Dorothea Ida Eveliina Ista; 12 December 1932 – 20 February 2014), better known by her stage name Tea Ista, was a Finnish actress. She began her acting career in 1952. She was born in Evijärvi.

Ista died after a serious illness on 20 February 2014 in Espoo aged 81. Her husband was Jack Witikka.
