= Rikas tyttö =

1939 film

- Directed by: Valentin Vaala
- Screenplay by: Nisse Hirn
- Story by: Kersti Bergroth
- Starring: Sirkka Sari; Olavi Reimas; Lea Joutseno
- Distributed by: Suomi-Filmi
- Release date: 17 September 1939
- Running time: 80 minutes
- Country: Finland
- Language: Finnish

Rikas tyttö (English translation - The Rich Girl) is a 1939 Finnish film directed by Valentin Vaala.

== Cast ==
- Sirkka Sari as Anni Hall
- Olavi Reimas as Vilhelm Vinter
- Lea Joutseno as Lea
- Hannes Häyrinen as Markus Hall
- Irma Seikkula as Irja Rantanen
- Turo Kartto as Baron Allan Ahlfeldt
- Anni Aitto as Mrs. Hall
- Arvi Tuomi as Alfred Hall
- Elsa Rantalainen as Mrs. Karila
- Eija Karipää as Edla Lundström (as Eija Londén)
- Uolevi Räsänen as Lasse
- Tuulikki Schreck as Auroora Rantanen

== Production ==
The film is remembered today for being the last film starring Sirkka Sari, due to her death at a party for the cast and crew of the film. Due to Sari's death, another actress replaced her for the few remaining scenes that needed to be filmed. Scenes were shot from further away to hide the fact her character was being played by another actress.

== Reception ==
Writer C. Celli compared the film to previous Vaala films in that it "repeats the urban-rural theme in a class tension melodrama".
