= Nanny Westerlund =

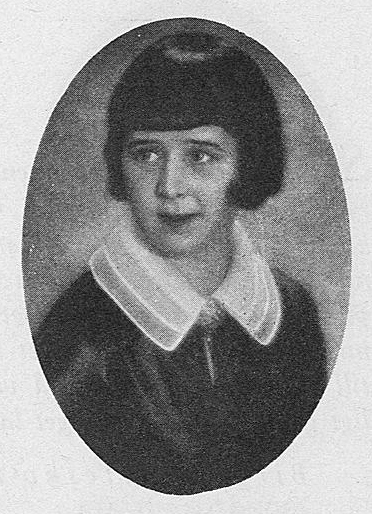
- Born: April 29, 1895; Kemiö, Finland
- Died: February 10, 1989 (aged 93); Oulunkylä, Finland

Nanny Rosalie Westerlund-Serlachius (29 April 1895, Kemiö - 10 February 1989 Oulunkylä) was a Finland-Swedish actress, director, teacher and writer.

== Biography ==
Nanny Westerlund was the youngest of nine siblings. She was the daughter to captain Anders Westerlund and Maria Elisabeth Wahlström. She was married to Jarl Egil Serlachius.

== Works ==
- Folket vid fjärden (1933)
- Det var just sä har — eller nastan (1935)
- En fattig upplevelse (1936)
- Gummireparationcentralen (1936)
- Svartviken (1936)
- Madeleine skrattar (1945)
