= Mikko Niskanen =

Finnish film director

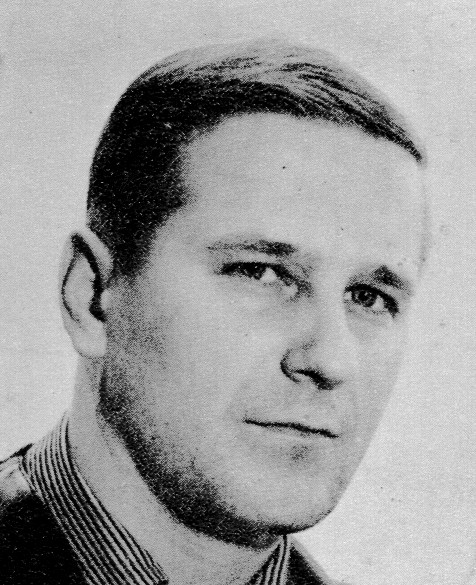
- Born: Mikko Johannes Niskanen; 31 January 1929; Äänekoski, Finland
- Died: 25 November 1990 (aged 61); Helsinki, Finland
- Occupations: Film director, actor, producer, screenwriter
- Years active: 1950–1988
- Notable work: Eight Deadly Shots (1972)

Mikko Johannes Niskanen (31 January 1929 – 25 November 1990) was a Finnish film director, actor, producer and screenwriter. He directed more than 40 films between 1956 and 1988. His most acclaimed films include The Boys (1962), Under Your Skin (1966) The Song of the Blood-Red Flower (1971), and Eight Deadly Shots (1972). He won a record number of six Jussi Awards for direction over his career.

== Early life and career ==
Mikko Niskanen was born in Äänekoski, Central Finland. He was the third of six children, and his father worked as a timber barge pilot. His mother too had a job outside the home, so the children often spent summers with their grandmother in Viitasaari.

At the age of 13, Mikko Niskanen started working in timber felling and floating. Two years later he enrolled in a vocational school in Jyväskylä to become a car mechanic. He took a serious interest in amateur theatre and was accepted to study at the Finnish Theatre Academy in Helsinki from 1947 until 1950. He then acted in Jyväskylä and Kuopio theatres until 1954 when he landed an actor's job at the film studios of Suomen Filmiteollisuus in Helsinki. One of his first film roles was in Edvin Laine's The Unknown Soldier (1955). Between 1958 and 1961 Niskanen studied at the Moscow Film School in the Soviet Union.

Niskanen's 1962 film The Boys was entered into the 3rd Moscow International Film Festival. He continued his directing career focusing on themes such as rural life and youth. His second breakthrough was Under Your Skin (Käpy selän alla, 1966), a story of two young couples spending a weekend camping in the countryside. The film received six Jussi Awards and was followed by another story about young lovers, Asfalttilampaat (1968).

Niskanen's tour de force as both actor and director was the five-hour television drama Eight Deadly Shots which was also released as a 145-minute theatrical version edited by Jörn Donner. Based on a true story from late 1960s Finland, it is a naturalistic drama about a poor farmer struggling to make a living for his family. He gradually becomes a violent alcoholic who goes on killing spree when the police arrive to calm him down. Besides directing, Niskanen gave a powerful and intense performance in the leading role. The film, like many of Niskanen's works was shot on locations around his home province north of Jyväskylä.

== Death ==
Mikko Niskanen died of cancer at the age of 61. He was buried in the Malmi Cemetery.
