= Lea Joutseno =

Finnish actress, screenwriter and translator

Lea Ruth Margit Joutseno (formerly Jönsson, 6 November 1910, Helsinki – 20 June 1977) was a Finnish actress, screenwriter and a translator. She became known as a blonde comedian in the 1940s after appearing in several Valentin Vaala's films. Along with Helena Kara and Regina Linnanheimo, Joutseno was one of the few Finnish film stars who did not have a theatrical background.

== Film career ==
Lea Joutseno played the female lead in nine films between 1941 and 1948. Most of them were comedies, and except for two, directed by Valentin Vaala. In 1948, Joutseno co-wrote the film Ihmiset suviyössä with Vaala, a work for which they received a Jussi Award. She had previously received one Jussi Award for the best actress in a leading role in the 1944 Vaala film Dynamiittityttö. After ending her film career, Joutseno continued to work as a translator.

== Private life ==
In her private life, Lea Joutseno was described as being similar to her film characters in the 1940s; cheerful, benevolent and optimistic. She was married three times. Her first two husbands died within a year of their wedding. Joutseno died suddenly at the age of 66 on 20 June 1977.

== Filmography ==
- Juurakon Hulda (1937)
- Niskavuoren naiset (1938)
- Vihreä kulta (1939)
- Rikas tyttö (1939)
- Poikani pääkonsuli (1940)
- Kersantilleko Emma nauroi? (1940)
- Morsian yllättää (1941)
- Varaventtiili (1942)
- Hopeakihlajaiset (1942)
- Tositarkoituksella (1943) (also screenplay)
- Neiti Tuittupää (1943)
- Dynamiittityttö (1944) (also screenplay)
- Vuokrasulhanen (1945) (also screenplay)
- Viikon tyttö (1946) (also screenplay)
- Kilroy sen teki (1948) (also screenplay)
- Ihmiset suviyössä (1948) (screenplay only)
