= Rauli Tuomi =

Finnish actor (1919–1949)

Rauli Rafael Arvid Tuomi (15 July 1919 – 2 February 1949) was a Finnish film and stage actor.

== Career ==
Tuomi appeared in 23 films since 1938. He won two Jussi Awards for Best Actor; first from the film Linnaisten vihreä kamari (1945) and the second from "Minä elän" (1948). Alongside his film career, he worked in the Finnish National Theatre, playing successful roles in such plays as Sappho (1945) and Romeo and Juliet (1946).

== Personal life ==
Tuomi was born in Helsinki into a family of actors. His parents were actors Arvi Tuomi and Santa Tuomi while actress Liisa Tuomi was his sister. Rauli Tuomi was married to actress Rakel Linnanheimo for five years until his death from suicide in 1949.

== Filmography ==
- Nummisuutarit (1938)
- Laulu tulipunaisesta kukasta (1938)
- Jumalan tuomio (1939)
- Helmikuun manifesti (1939)
- Halveksittu (1939)
- Aktivistit (1939)
- Yövartija vain... (1940)
- SF-paraati (1940)
- Runon kuningas ja muuttolintu (1940)
- Kyökin puolella (1940)
- Kaivopuiston kaunis Regina (1941)
- Synnin puumerkki (1942)
- The Dead Man Loses His Temper (1944)
- Kartanon naiset (1944)
- Linnaisten vihreä kamari (1945)
- Rakkauden risti (1946)
- "Minä elän" (1946)
- Suopursu kukkii (1947)
- Pimeänpirtin hävitys (1947)
- Naiskohtaloita (1947)
- Hedelmätön puu (1947)
- Soita minulle, Helena! (1948)
- Haaviston Leeni (1948)
