= The Harvest Month =

1956 Finnish drama film

- Film poster
- Directed by: Matti Kassila
- Written by: Matti Kassila
- Based on: Elokuu by F. E. Sillanpää
- Produced by: Mauno Mäkelä
- Starring: Toivo Mäkelä
- Cinematography: Esko Nevalainen
- Edited by: Nils Holm
- Release date: 5 October 1956
- Running time: 94 minutes
- Country: Finland
- Language: Finnish

The Harvest Month (Finnish: Elokuu) is a 1956 Finnish drama film directed by Matti Kassila, based on the 1941 novel by F. E. Sillanpää. It was entered into the 1957 Cannes Film Festival.

The Harvest Month was filmed in the spring and summer of 1956. The filming locations were Murole Canal and its surroundings in Ruovesi. The city shots were shot in Tampere, while the interior scenes were shot at the studios in Kulosaari, Helsinki.

== Cast ==
- Toivo Mäkelä as Viktor Sundvall
- Emma Väänänen as Saimi Sundvall
- Rauni Luoma as Maija Länsilehto
- Aino-Maija Tikkanen as Tyyne Sundvall
- Rauni Ikäheimo as Iita
- Senni Nieminen as Hanna Nieminen
- Heikki Savolainen as Mauno Viljanen
- Tauno Kajander as Taave
- Sylvi Salonen as Actress
- Topi Kankainen as Alpertti
- Pentti Irjala as the first man at sauna
- Olavi Ahonen as the second man at sauna
- Väinö Luutonen as Väinö Länsilehto
- Keijo Lindroos as Dancing man
- Mauri Jaakkola as Viktor's friend
- Severi Seppänen as Doctor
- Kaija Siikala as Viktor's first love
