= Frozen City =

- Theatrical release poster
- Directed by: Aku Louhimies
- Written by: Mikko Kouki; Paavo Westerberg
- Produced by: Markus Selin
- Cinematography: Rauno Ronkainen
- Production company: Solar Films
- Distributed by: Buena Vista International
- Release date: 17 November 2006
- Running time: 92 minutes
- Country: Finland
- Language: Finnish

Frozen City (Finnish: Valkoinen kaupunki) is a 2006 Finnish drama film directed by Aku Louhimies. It tells the story of taxi driver Veli-Matti, who is tired of seeing the filth of humanity in his work and whose own life is suddenly flushed down the toilet because of divorce.

== Cast ==
- Janne Virtanen - Veli-Matti
- Susanna Anteroinen - Hanna
- Aada Hämes - Aada
- Santtu Nuutinen - Santtu
- Viivi Hämes - Viivi
- Jari Pehkonen - Seppo

== Awards ==
Frozen city won five Jussi Awards (2007): Best director, best actor, best actress, best screenplay and best editing.
