= Erkko Kivikoski =

Finnish film director and screenwriter (1936–2005)

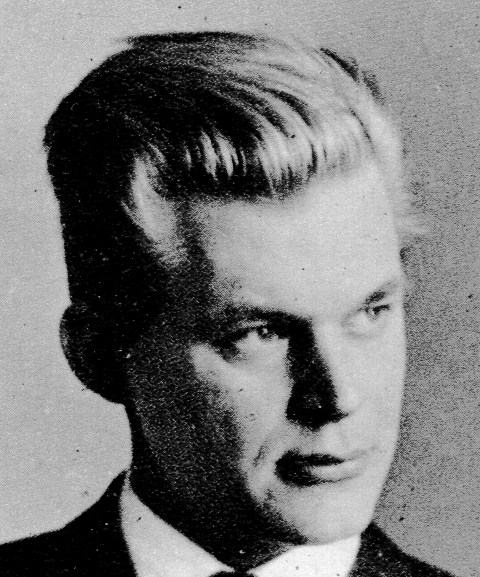
- Born: 2 July 1936; Iisalmi, Finland
- Died: 11 August 2005 (aged 69); Turku, Finland
- Occupations: Film director Screenwriter
- Years active: 1962–1981

Erkko Kivikoski (2 July 1936 – 11 August 2005) was a Finnish film director and screenwriter. He directed nine films between 1962 and 1981. His 1963 film Kesällä kello 5 was entered into the 14th Berlin International Film Festival. His 1981 film Night by the Seashore was entered into the 12th Moscow International Film Festival where it won a Special Diploma.

== Filmography ==
- Kaasua, komisario Palmu! (Cinematographer)
- EP-X-503 (1962)
- Tori (1963)
- Kesällä kello 5 (1963)
- Käyntikorttini... (1964)
- Ovi (1966)
- Kuuma kissa? (1968)
- Kesyttömät veljekset (1969)
- Laukaus tehtaalla (1973)
- Yö meren rannalla (1981)
