= Tapio Vilpponen =

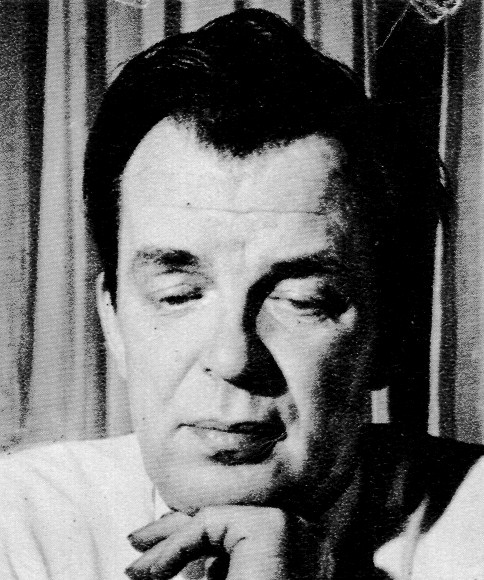

Tapio Vilpponen (31 May 1913 − 31 August 1994) was a Finnish screenwriter, set designer, costume designer, painter, graphic artist, interior designer, sculptor, copywriter, journalist, cartoonist and columnist. He also starred in a few films. Vilpponen used the pseudonyms Roy and Juan Batiste Montauban.

== Selected filmography as Roy ==
- Ryhmy ja Romppainen (1941)
- Linnaisten vihreä kamari (1945)
- Gabriel, tule takaisin (1951)
- Pessi ja Illusia (1954)
- Silja − nuorena nukkunut (1956)
- Nuoruus vauhdissa (1961)
- Valkoinen kissa (1965)
