= Marja-Leena Mikkola =

Finnish writer (born 1939)

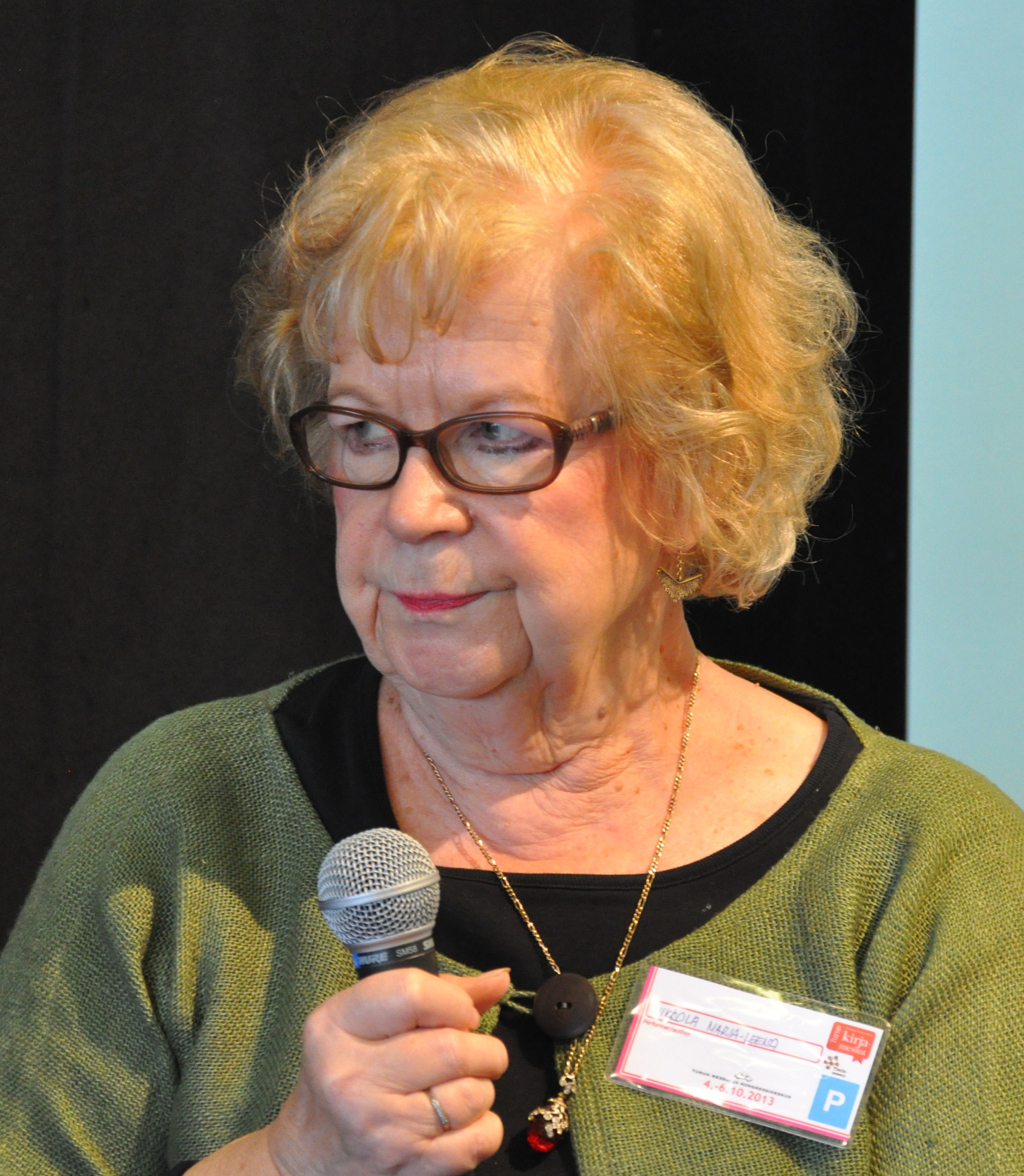
Marja-Leena Mikkola

Marja-Leena Mikkola (born 18 March 1939 in Salo, Finland) is a Finnish writer and recipient of the Eino Leino Prize in 1967.
