= Linnaisten vihreä kamari =

- Theatrical poster
- Directed by: Valentin Vaala
- Written by: Usko Hurmerinta
- Based on: Linnaisten kartanon viheriä kamari by Zachris Topelius
- Produced by: Matti Schreck
- Starring: Rauli Tuomi; Regina Linnanheimo; Kaija Rahola; Paavo Jännes; Ture Junttu
- Cinematography: Eino Heino
- Edited by: Valentin Vaala
- Music by: Felix Krohn
- Production company: Suomi-Filmi
- Distributed by: Suomi-Filmi
- Release date: 4 February 1945
- Running time: 91 minutes
- Country: Finland
- Language: Finnish

Linnaisten vihreä kamari (The Green Chamber of Linnais) is a 1945 Finnish film directed by Valentin Vaala. Mixing elements of horror and romance, it is based on an 1859 novel The Green Chamber of the Linnainen Mansion (Linnaisten kartanon viheriä kamari) by Zachris Topelius.

The film represents the style of pure escapism with its mansion settings filled with romances, wrong identities and centuries-old secrets. It was the most watched Finnish premiere film of 1945 and went on to win three Jussi Awards; Rauli Tuomi for best actor in a leading role, Eino Heino for best cinematography and Roy for best production design.

== Reception ==
Linnaisten vihreä kamari received mixed reviews. It was noted for achieving to create a genuine historical-romantic atmosphere. Also the acting, cinematography and production design were praised. On the other hand, some critics mentioned that the film failed to modernize the themes of the original novel.

== Main cast ==
- Rauli Tuomi as Kaarle Lithau
- Regina Linnanheimo as Anna Littow
- Kaija Rahola as Ringa Littow
- Paavo Jännes as Karl Sigismund Littow / Jaakko von Littow
- Eine Laine as Winterloo
- Reino Valkama as Eusebius Winterloo
- Ture Junttu as Spiegelberg
- Mailis Vaaja as Adelaide Triste-Ruban
- Arvi Tuomi as Holming
- Henny Waljus as Justiina
- Erkki Kalakari as Rosengreni
- Elli Ylimaa as Renata Weder
- Arvo Lehesmaa as Weder
