= Hannu Leminen =

Finnish director, set designer and broadcasting executive

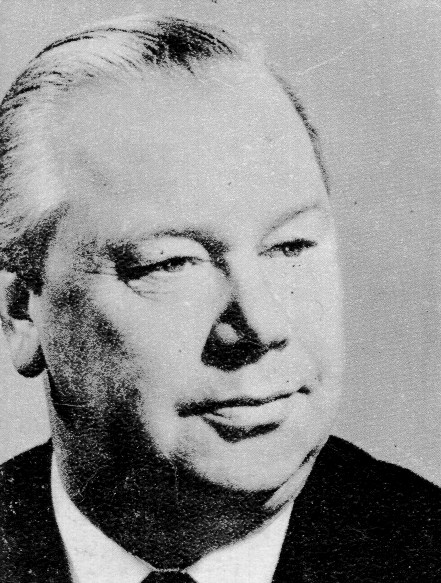
Hannu Leminen

Hannu Päiviö Leminen (originally Hanno Leminen; 5 January 1910 in Helsinki – 6 June 1997 in Turku) was a Finnish film director, set designer, screenwriter and later an executive at the Finnish Broadcasting Company. During his career, Leminen directed almost 30 films.

Leminen was married to actress Helena Kara (1916–2002) who appeared in almost all of his films. He won four Jussi Awards; for directing the film Valkoiset ruusut (1943) and the Olympic documentary Maailmat kohtaavat (Where the World Meets, 1952), and for set designing En ole kreivitär (1945) and Morsiusseppele (1954).

== Selected filmography as a director ==
- Täysosuma (1941)
- Valkoiset ruusut (1943)
- Tuomari Martta (1943)
- Synnitön lankeemus (1943)
- Vain sinulle (1945)
- Synnin jäljet (1946)
- Tree Without Fruit (1947)
- Dinner for Two (1947)
- Soita minulle, Helena! (1948)
- Rosvo Roope (1949)
- Kesäillan valssi (1951)
- Where the World Meets (1952)
- Kultaa ja kunniaa (Gold and Glory) (1953)
- Onnelliset (1954)
- Morsiusseppele (1954)
- Vieras mies (1957)
