= Emma Väänänen =

Finnish actress (1907–1970)

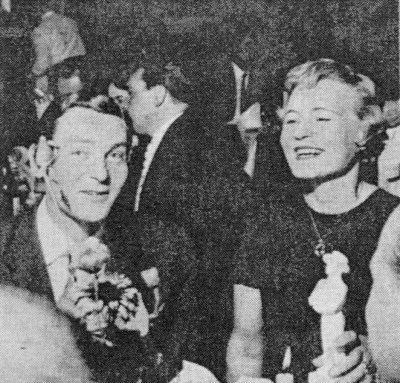
- Emma Väänänen in 1958 with her husband Eino Heino.
- Born: 22 December 1907; Mikkeli, Finland
- Died: 20 February 1970 (aged 62); Helsinki, Finland
- Occupation: Actress
- Years active: 1941–1969

Emma Väänänen (22 December 1907 – 20 February 1970) was a Finnish film actress. She appeared in 49 films between 1941 and 1969. She was a member of the jury at the 1st Moscow International Film Festival in 1959.

== Selected filmography ==
- Golden Light (1946)
- Tree Without Fruit (1947)
- People in the Summer Night (1948)
- The Harvest Month (1956)
