= Night by the Seashore =

1981 film

- Directed by: Erkko Kivikoski
- Written by: Pirjo Hokkanen; Eila Pennanen; Erkko Kivikoski
- Starring: Pertti Palo
- Release date: 30 January 1981
- Running time: 84 minutes
- Country: Finland
- Language: Finnish

Night by the Seashore (Finnish: Yö meren rannalla) is a 1981 Finnish drama film directed by Erkko Kivikoski. It was entered into the 12th Moscow International Film Festival where it won a Special Diploma.

== Cast ==
- Pertti Palo as Mikko
- Sirkku Grahn as Liisa
- Pauli Virtanen as Heikki
- Eeva Eloranta as Pirre
- Mauri Heikkilä as Erik
- Pirkko Uitto as Jonna
- Matti Laustela as Pete
