= Valentin Vaala =

Finnish film director, screenwriter and editor

- Валентин Яковлевич Иванов
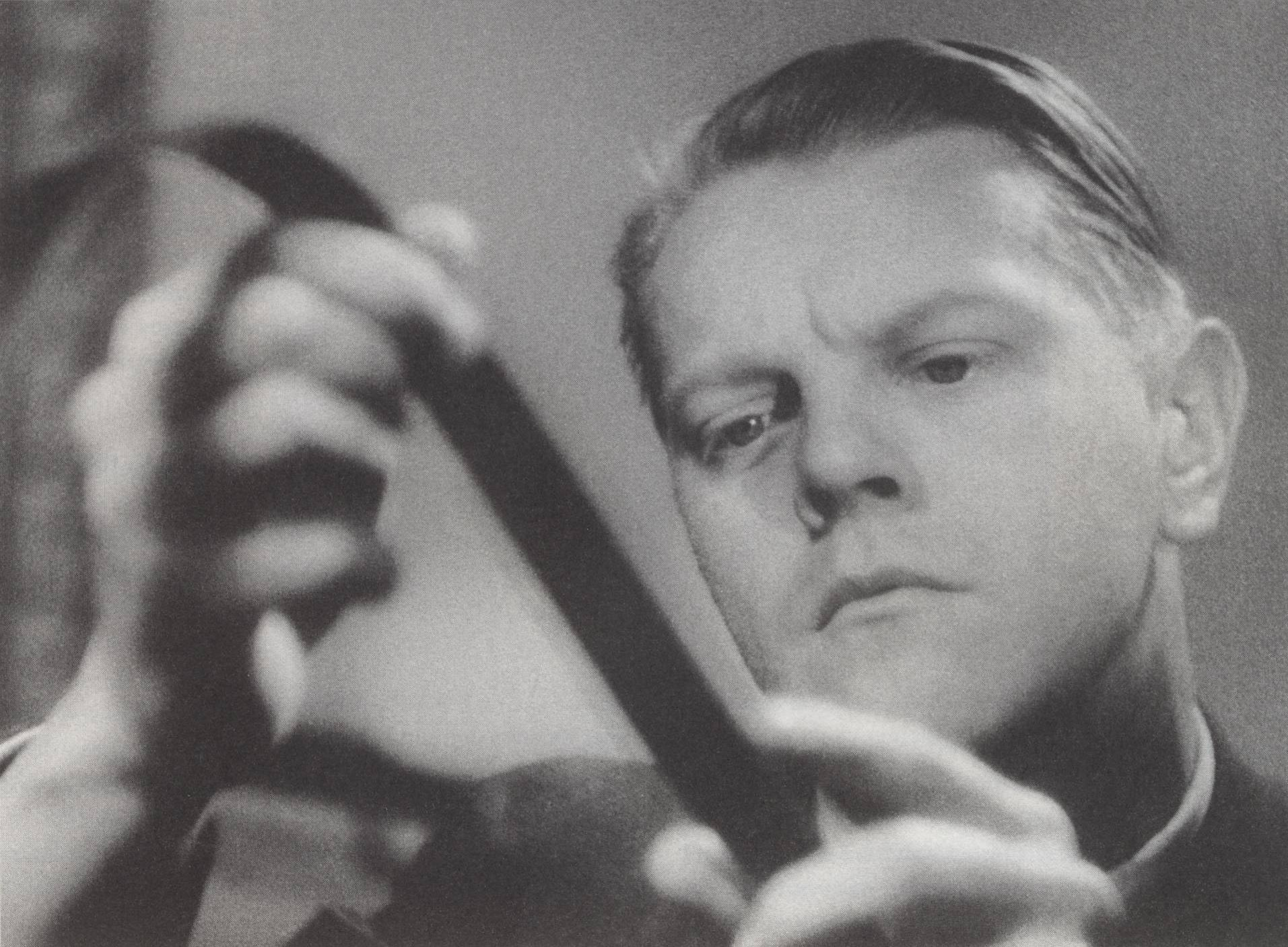
- Born: Valentin Ivanoff; 13 October 1909; Helsinki, Grand Duchy of Finland
- Died: 21 November 1976 (aged 67); Helsinki, Finland
- Occupations: Film director, screenwriter and film editor
- Years active: 1929–1973

Valentin Ivanoff (Russian: Валентин Яковлевич Иванов, Valentin Yakovlevich Ivanov; 13 October 1909 – 21 November 1976), known better as Valentin Vaala, was a Finnish film director, screenwriter and film editor. His career spanned several decades, from 1929 to 1973, and has been called one of the most significant, in both quality and popularity, in the history of Finnish cinema.

== Early career ==
Vaala was born to Russian parents Jakov Ivanov (Ivanoff), a milliner, and Nadezhda Aleksandrovna Jeminova. The couple moved from Saint Petersburg to Helsinki prior to Vaala's birth. The family spoke Russian at home, and Valentin attended school at Helsinki's Russian-language Tabunov School. After leaving school, he worked as an illustrator for the daily newspaper Uusi Suomi from 1926 until 1929.

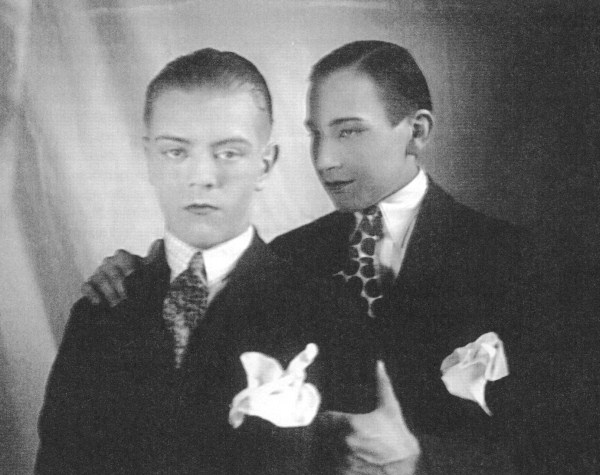
Valentin Vaala and Teuvo Tulio in the 1920s

As a teenager, Vaala befriended Theodor Tugai – who later became known as a film director and actor under the name Teuvo Tulio – and the pair recognized their common interest in films. They decided to start making films together, but their first feature-length attempt, Mustat silmät in 1929, never received wide distribution. Vaala himself was reportedly so disappointed with the resulting film that he dumped the original camera negatives into the sea. However, later in the same year, Vaala and Tulio partially remade the film as Mustalaishurmaaja for the Fennica-Filmi company. This film became a hit and earned the starring Tulio the nickname "Finland's Valentino". The pair went on to make two other films, Laveata tietä (1931) and Sininen varjo (1933) with Vaala directing and Tulio starring.

While Tulio moved on with his own acting and directing career, Vaala went on to direct his last film for Fennica-Filmi, Helsingin kuuluisin liikemies, in 1934. After the demise of Fennica, Vaala directed one film for Bio-Kuva, Kun isä tahtoo…, also in 1934. The next year Vaala was hired as the second director of the film production company, Suomi-Filmi, following Risto Orko. Vaala remained contracted to the company for the rest of his career.

== Career with Suomi-Filmi ==
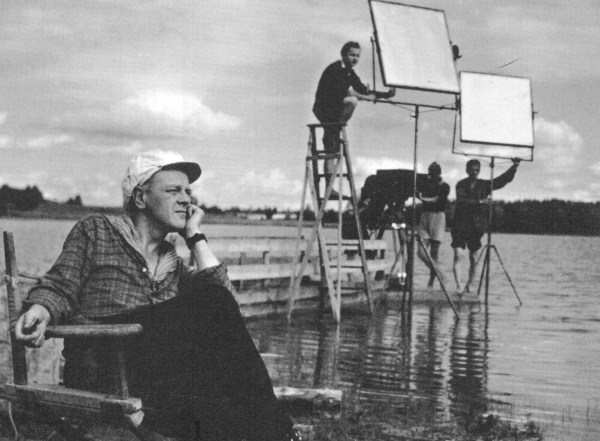
Vaala on set of the 1948 film Ihmiset suviyössä on location in Hauho.

During his career, Vaala directed 44 feature-length theatrical films, the second most among Finnish directors, behind only Toivo Särkkä. 38 of those films were made while he was employed by Suomi-Filmi. His first film with the company was the romantic comedy Kaikki rakastavat (1935). It was also the first film that Ansa Ikonen and Tauno Palo starred in together. The film was followed by an urban comedy, Vaimoke in 1936, which starred the same leading pair, and ended up being a popular success and served as the breakthrough film for all involved. The film was an adaptation from a work by Hilja Valtonen, as was the sequel, Mieheke, which Vaala directed in the same year.

Many of Vaala's films were adaptations of popular classics of Finnish literature, by authors such as Mika Waltari, Aleksis Kivi and Maiju Lassila. Vaala also directed several adaptations on works by Frans Eemil Sillanpää, one of which, Ihmiset suviyössä (1948), has been called his best film, and is reported to have been one of the director's personal favorites. Another personal favorite of his, and also a popular success, was Loviisa, Niskavuoren nuori emäntä (1946), an adaptation from a Wuolijoki play.

During Vaala's career, his most popular films reached huge audiences in relation to the size of his home country. One of his most popular films, Juurakon Hulda (1937), was seen in cinemas by approximately a million viewers out of a population of 3.5 million. It was also remade in Hollywood as The Farmer's Daughter. Vaala's other popular films included Niskavuoren naiset in 1938 and his adaptations from Mika Waltari's books Gabriel, tule takaisin (1951) and Omena putoaa… (1952). Nummisuutarit in 1957 and Nuori Mylläri in 1958 were also among the most watched films in Finland during their release years.

Vaala's final feature film was Totuus on armoton in 1963, but his career still continued as a director of short films. His last credited work was a short documentary film about the Finlandia Hall, created at the request of the city of Helsinki.

== Personal life ==
Valentin Ivanoff based his pseudonym "Vaala" on his childhood nickname Valja (Valya).

Vaala was a homosexual and he never married.

For his whole life, Vaala lived in Helsinki.

== Awards ==
Vaala won three Jussi Awards for directing and one for screenwriting. One of the directing awards was given jointly for Dynamiittityttö and Linnaisten vihreä kamari in 1945, the others were for Loviisa, Niskavuoren nuori emäntä (1946) and Omena putoaa (1952). He earned the lone screenwriting award with Ihmiset suviyössä (1946).

== Filmography ==
- Mustat silmät, 1929
- Mustalaishurmaaja, 1929
- Laveata tietä, 1931
- Sininen varjo, 1933
- Helsingin kuuluisin liikemies, 1934
- Kun isä tahtoo…, 1935
- Kaikki rakastavat, 1935
- Vaimoke, 1936
- Mieheke, 1936
- Koskenlaskijan morsian, 1937
- Juurakon Hulda, 1938
- Niskavuoren naiset, 1938
- Sysmäläinen, 1938
- Rikas tyttö, 1939
- Vihreä kulta, 1939
- Jumalan myrsky, 1940
- Antreas ja syntinen Jolanda, 1941
- Morsian yllättää, 1941
- Varaventtiili, 1942
- Keinumorsian, 1943
- Neiti Tuittupää, 1943
- Tositarkoituksella, 1943
- Dynamiittityttö, 1944
- Linnaisten vihreä kamari, 1945
- Vuokrasulhanen, 1945
- Viikon tyttö, 1946
- Loviisa – Niskavuoren nuori emäntä, 1946
- Maaret – tunturien tyttö, 1947
- Ihmiset suviyössä, 1948
- Jossain on railo, 1949
- Sinut minä tahdon, 1949
- Gabriel tule takaisin, 1951
- Kulkurin tyttö, 1952
- Omena putoaa…, 1952
- Huhtikuu tulee, 1953
- Siltalan pehtoori, 1953
- Minäkö isä, 1954
- Minä ja mieheni morsian, 1955
- Yhteinen vaimomme, 1956
- Nummisuutarit, 1957
- Nuori Mylläri, 1958
- Niskavuoren naiset, 1958
- Nuoruus vauhdissa, 1961
- Totuus on armoton, 1963
