= Jussi Awards =

Finnish film industry awards

- Previous: 80th Jussi Awards; March 20, 2026; Next: 81st Jussi Awards; Date TBD
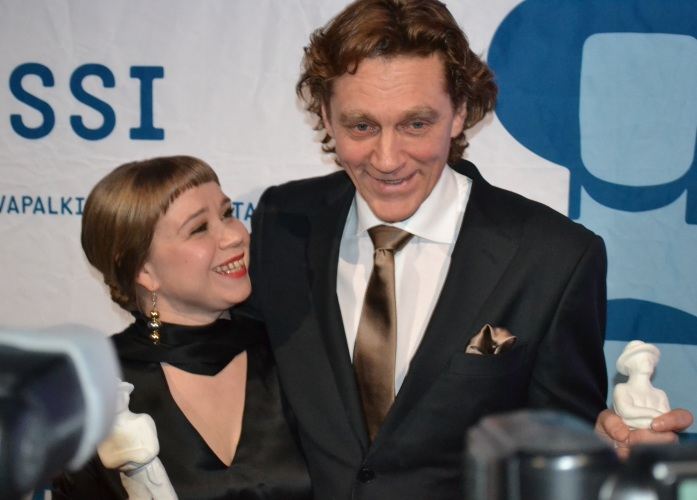
- Award winners Katja Küttner and Ville Virtanen at the Jussi Awards ceremony in 2011.
- Awarded for: Excellence in cinematic achievements
- Country: Finland
- Presented by: Filmiaura
- First award: 16 November 1944; 82 years ago
- Website: Jussit.fi

The Jussi Awards are Finland's premier film industry prizes, awarded annually to recognize the achievements of directors, actors, and writers.

== History ==
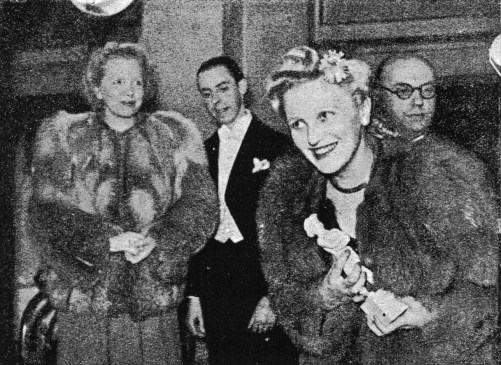
Jussi Award in 1944. Ansa Ikonen received Jussi for Best Actress.

The first Jussi Awards ceremony was held on 16 November 1944 at the Restaurant Adlon in Helsinki. The award is one of the oldest films awards in Europe.

The original planned name for the prize was Aino, but Jussi won in the end. The name comes from a character in the 1924 and 1936 Pohjalaisia films.

The awards were originally organized by the Elokuvajournalistit organization, but the task was transferred in the early 1960s to the Filmiaura organization, composed of around 300 members working in the Finnish film industry. Because of the controversy surrounding the transfer, no awards were handed out in 1960 and 1961.

== Description ==
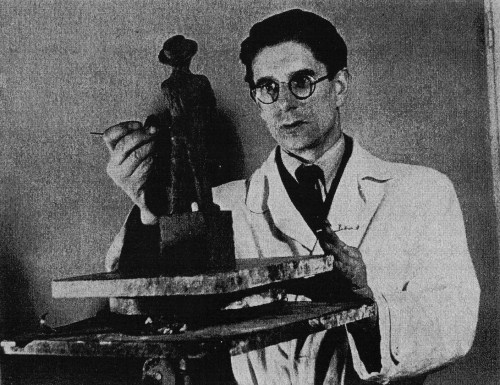
Sculptor Ben Renvall designed the Jussi Award.

The award trophy is a gypsum statuette depicting a standing man with a hat, based on the character of Jussi in the aforementioned films. It was designed by sculptor Ben Renvall. They are now hand-made by Renvall's son Seppo Renvall.

== Categories ==
All winners except in the public favorite category are chosen in a closed vote by Filmiaura, an association of roughly 260 film professionals. The categories are:

- Best Film
- Best Director
- Best Leading Performance
- Best Supporting Performance
- Best Screenplay
- Best Cinematography
- Best Original Score
- Best Editing
- Best Sound Design
- Best Production Design
- Best Costume Design
- Best Documentary
- Best Makeup
- Best Short Film

=== Retired categories ===
- Best Actor (1944–2022)
- Best Actress (1944–2022)
- Best Supporting Actor (1944–1965, 1981–2022)
- Best Supporting Actress (1944–1965, 1981–2022)
