= Koljonen =

Surname list

Koljonen is the surname of the following people

- Kalle Koljonen (born 1994), Finnish badminton player
- Niilo Koljonen (1927–2004), Finnish social scientist
- Pele Koljonen (born 1988), Finnish footballer
- Toivo Koljonen (1912–1943), Finnish murderer
- Vilho Koljonen (1910–2000), Finnish writer and photographer
