= Ilkka Villi =

Finnish actor (born 1975)

- Villi in 2026
- Born: 4 August 1975 (age 51); Helsinki, Finland
- Occupations: Actor; writer; radio journalist
- Years active: 2004–present

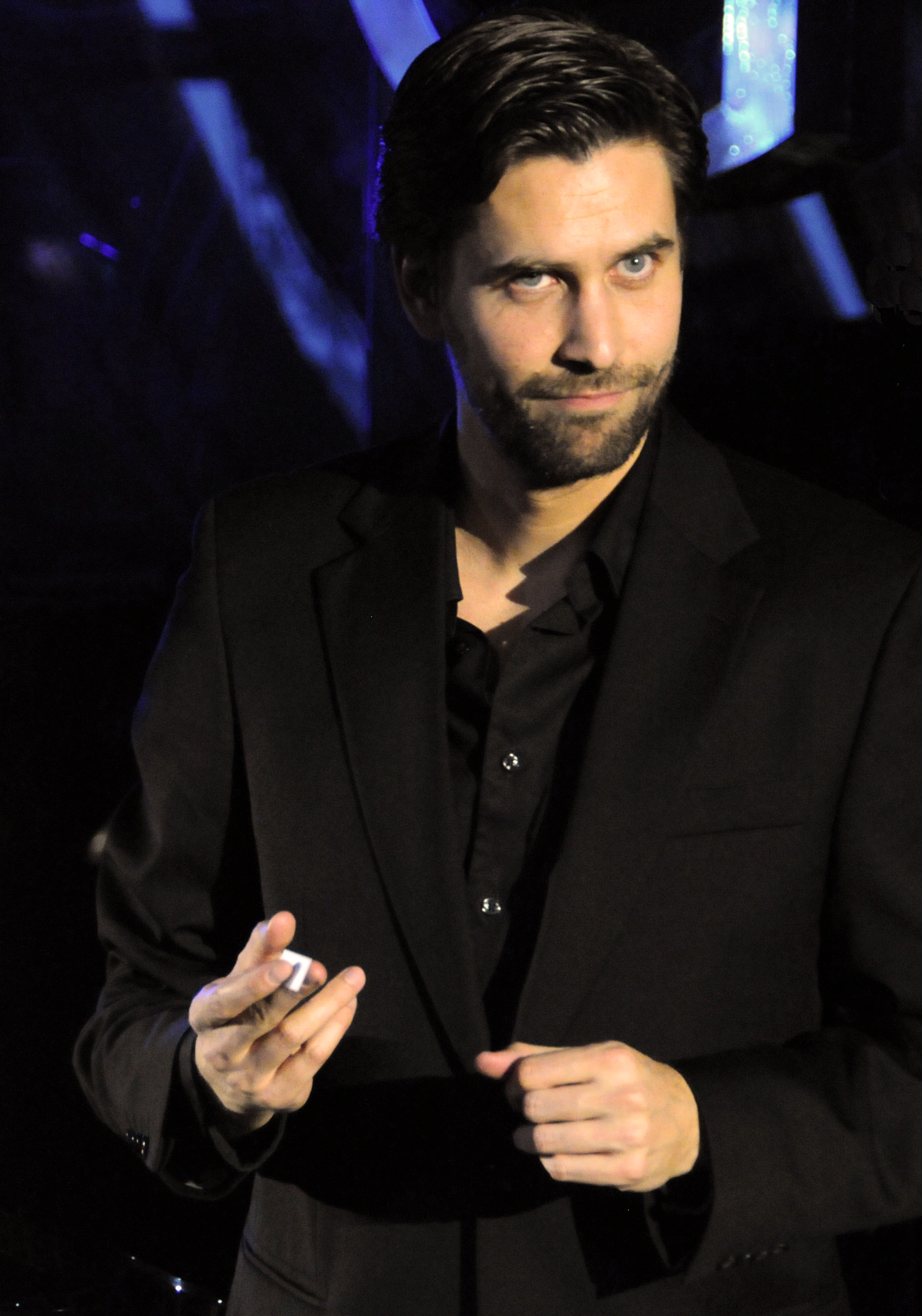
Ilkka Villi in 2010

Ilkka Villi (born 4 August 1975) is a Finnish actor and writer, best known internationally for his work in the Alan Wake video games as well as the crime drama series Bordertown. He has played a variety of roles in theatre, television, and film.

== Early life ==
Before proceeding with an acting career, Villi worked as a radio journalist and writer.

== Career ==
Villi plays one half of the titular character in the Alan Wake video game franchise. In the role, Villi provides virtual reference for the character model, motion capture, and facial expression capture for Wake, while Matthew Porretta voices the character both in-game and during live-action cutscenes.

In 2016, Villi was cast as one of the lead police investigators in the crime drama series Bordertown, which was picked up by streaming service Netflix.

== Selected filmography ==
=== Film ===
List of film appearances, with year, title, and role shown
Year	Title	Role	Notes
2004	Pelicanman	Businessman	
2005	Promise	Lieutenant Veikko Vuori	
2007	Tali-Ihantala 1944	Corporal Olli Taponen	
2009	The House of Branching Love	Marco	
2011	Dirty Bomb	Roba	
2011	Body of Water	Julia's ex-husband	
2012	Imaginaerum	Mr. White / Theodore Whitman	

=== Television ===
List of television appearances, with year, title, and role shown
Year	Title	Role	Notes
2002	Kotikatu	Pena	4 episodes
2008–09	Married to a Lie	Luttinen	4 episodes
2010	Bright Falls	Alan Wake	3 episodes
2013	Nymphs	Erik Mann	12 episodes
2014	Lovemilla	TV-Aimo	1 episode
2016–19	Bordertown	Niko	31 episodes

=== Video games ===
List of video game appearances, with year, title, and role shown
Year	Title	Role	Notes
2010	Alan Wake	Alan Wake / Mr. Scratch	3D model, motion capture, live action performance
2012	Alan Wake's American Nightmare	Alan Wake / Mr. Scratch	3D model, motion capture, live action performance
2016	Quantum Break	Alan Wake / Mr. Scratch	Live action cameo
2020	Control	Alan Wake / Thomas Zane	3D model, motion capture, live action performance, voice (Zane only)
2023	Alan Wake II	Alan Wake / Scratch / Thomas Zane	3D model, motion capture, live action performance, voice (Zane only)
2026	Control Resonant	Alan Wake	Live-action cameo

== Awards and nominations ==
Year	Award	Category	Nominated work	Result	Ref.
2024	British Academy Games Awards	Performer in a Leading Role	Alan Wake II	Longlisted	
