= Perttu Leppä =

Finnish film director and screenwriter (born 1964)

Perttu Leppä (born 8 February 1964 in Joensuu, Finland) is a Finnish film director and screenwriter.

== Career ==
Making film since 1992 he has written and directed films such as Helmiä ja sikoja (Pearls and Pigs) in 2003 working with actors such as Mikko Leppilampi and Laura Birn.

== Filmography ==
=== Feature films ===
- A Long Hot Summer (Pitkä kuuma kesä, 1999)
- Pearls and Pigs (Helmiä ja sikoja, 2003)
- 8 Days to Premiere (8 päivää ensi-iltaan, 2008)

=== Short films ===
- For Ever and Ever (Aina ja aina, 1986)
- The Ostrich (Strutsi, 1987)
- One-One (Yksi-yksi, 1989)
- Karavaani (1994)
- Tyttöjä ja jäätelöä (1995)
- Angora (1996)
