= Bayonet (disambiguation) =

A bayonet is a blade fastened to the end of a gun or rifle.

Bayonet may also refer to:

== Military ==
- HMAS Bayonet (P 101), an Australian naval patrol boat
- Mossad assassinations following the Munich massacre or Operation Bayonet, a covert operation directed by Israel's Mossad

== Other uses ==
- Bayonet Constitution, a nickname for the 1887 Constitution of the Kingdom of Hawaii
- Bayonet lug, a metal feature used to attach a bayonet to a long gun
- Bayonet mount, an electrical fastening mechanism
- Lens mount, sometimes as a bayonet type
- Spanish bayonet (disambiguation), any of several plants in the genus Yucca or Hesperoyucca
- Operation Bayonet (darknet), multinational law enforcement operation targeting darknet
- Bayonet (1936 film), a 1936 Italian film
- Bayonet (2018 film), 2018 Finnish-Mexican film
- Bayonet (band), an American hardcore punk band
- Jūkendō, bayonet fighting, a Japanese martial art

== See also ==
- Bayonetta, a video game series
