= Long Hot Summer =

Long Hot Summer may refer to:

== Film and television ==
- The Long, Hot Summer, a 1958 film starring Paul Newman
- The Long, Hot Summer (TV series), a 1965 to 1966 television series
- The Long Hot Summer (1985 film), a television film starring Don Johnson
- A Long Hot Summer (film), a 1999 Finnish film

== Music ==
- "Long Hot Summer" (Tom Robinson song), 1978
- "Long Hot Summer" (The Style Council song), 1983
- "Long Hot Summer" (Girls Aloud song), 2005
- "Long Hot Summer" (Keith Urban song), 2011
- A Long Hot Summer, a 2004 album by Masta Ace

== Other ==
- Long, hot summer of 1967, in which multiple race riots occurred during the American Civil Rights Movement
- Long Hot Summer, a 2012 Image Comics publication

== See also ==
- "Long Hot Summer Night", a 1968 song by The Jimi Hendrix Experience from Electric Ladyland
