= Amanda Pilke =

Finnish actress

- Born: 2 March 1990 (age 35); Joensuu, Finland
- Occupation: Actress
- Years active: 2003–

Amanda Pilke (born 2 March 1990, in Joensuu) is a Finnish film and television actress.

== Career ==
Pilke started her career when she was 12, making her debut in the 2003 film Pearls and Pigs. Her second film role was in Forbidden Fruit, a 2009 film directed by Dome Karukoski, for which she received the Jussi Award in the Best Supporting Actress category. She did also television roles during the 2000s.

In 2012, Pilke played the role of Milla in Naked Harbour, directed by Aku Louhimies, and the role of Zara in Purge, directed by Antti Jokinen. Milla's role included sex scenes and as Zara she played a sex slave. She has said that Louhimies used harsh methods as a director. Playing in these films was a mentally exhausting experience for her and she stopped taking new acting roles after it.

After not acting in years, in 2018, Pilke played a small role in the television series Syke. Her bigger comeback role was in the 2023 television series Rosvopankki.

== Selected filmography ==
- 2003 Pearls and Pigs (Saara)
- 2007–2008 Karjalan kunnailla (TV series; Jonna Sahioja)
- 2009 Forbidden Fruit (Maria)
- 2012 Naked Harbour (Milla)
- 2012 Purge (Zara)
- 2023 Rosvopankki (TV series; Salla Nurminen)
