= Purge (2012 film) =

2012 Finnish drama film

- Film poster
- Directed by: Antti Jokinen
- Written by: Marko Leino; Antti Jokinen
- Produced by: Markus Selin
- Starring: Laura Birn
- Cinematography: Rauno Ronkainen
- Edited by: Kimmo Taavila
- Music by: Tuomas Kantelinen
- Production companies: Solar Films; Taska Film
- Release date: 7 September 2012
- Running time: 125 minutes
- Country: Finland
- Language: Finnish

Purge (Finnish: Puhdistus) is a 2012 Finnish drama film directed by Antti Jokinen, based on the novel of the same name by Sofi Oksanen. The film was selected as the Finnish entry for the Best Foreign Language Oscar at the 85th Academy Awards, but it did not make it to the final shortlist. At the 2013 Jussi Award, the film received eight nominations, including Best Film, Best Direction and Best Costume Design. It won Best Actress for Birn, Best Supporting Actress for Liisi Tandefelt, along with Best Cinematography, Best Sound Design and Best Make-Up Design. Birn was also nominated for the Satellite Award for Best Actress. The film stars Peter Franzén, Tommi Korpela, Krista Kosonen and Laura Birn.

== Plot ==
The exhausted Zara (Amanda Pilke) escapes Russian human traffickers that smuggled her from Russia to Tallinn, the capital of Estonia, under the pretext of working at a hotel. There, beaten and raped, she provides sexual services to gangster clients. After escaping, she goes to the home of an older woman, Aliide (Lisia Tandefelt), where she finds shelter. Two seemingly different women combine not only similar painful experiences, but also blood ties. The girl's experiences mean that the old woman must re-evaluate her life, full of suffering, sacrifice and unrequited love.

== Cast ==
- Laura Birn as Aliide Truu (younger)
- Liisi Tandefelt as Aliide Truu (older)
- Amanda Pilke as Zara
- Peter Franzén as Hans Pekk
- Krista Kosonen as Ingel
- Tommi Korpela as Martin Truu
- Kristjan Sarv as Paša
- Jarmo Mäkinen as Lavrenti
- Jaanika Arum as Katia
- Tomi Salmela as Miliisi
- Panu Vauhkonen as Pitkä miliisi
- Taavi Eelmaa as Jaan Berg

== Reception ==
The Purge received mostly positive reviews from Finnish critics, but there were also some critical voices. Tapani Maskula of Turun Sanomat found the film to be slow-paced, although restless camerawork and rapid cuts were used to give it an artificial pace. He sees it as a violent drama aimed at a broad audience, in which many of the levels and details of the novel on which it is based have been sacrificed for a one-sided anti-communism. He considered the roles of the two female characters to be well played, but that the men were only drawn as crude caricatures.

== See also ==
- List of submissions to the 85th Academy Awards for Best Foreign Language Film
- List of Finnish submissions for the Academy Award for Best Foreign Language Film
