= Rakel Liehu =

Finnish author

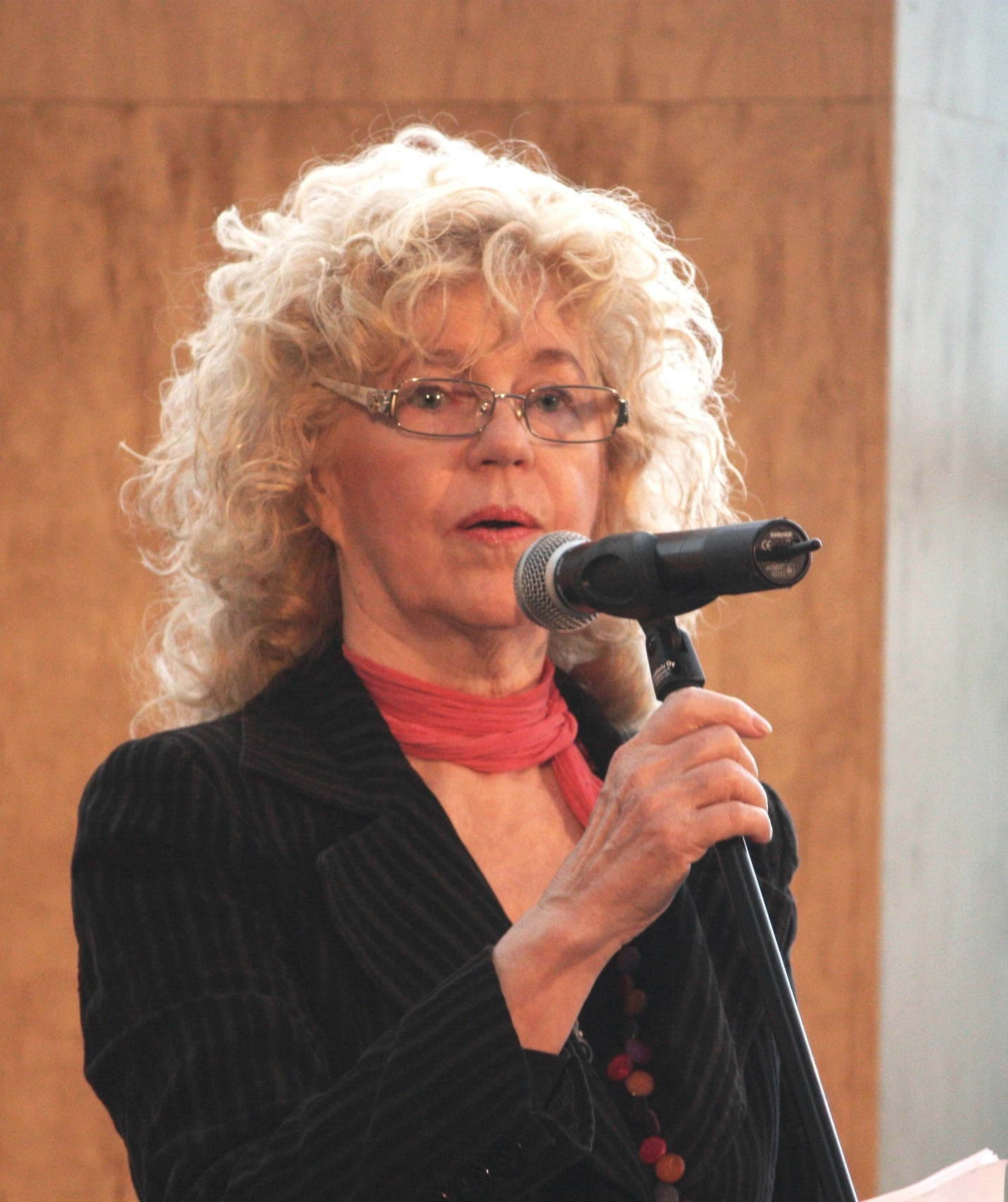
- Liehu in 2010
- Born: September 3, 1939 (age 86); Nivala, Finland
- Education: University of Helsinki
- Occupation: Writer
- Writing career
- Language: Finnish
- Years active: 1974 — present
- Notable work: Helene (2003)
- Notable awards: Runeberg Prize (2004); Finnish State Literature Prize (2008)

Rakel Liehu (born 3 September 1939) is a Finnish poet, dramatist and novelist.

== Works ==
Liehu began writing poetry at the age of 11, inspired by the works of women poets such as Aila Meriluoto, and has since gone on to publish 13 poetry collections.

She has also authored three novels, as well as two plays and various scripts.

Her debut poetry collection, Ihmisen murhe on yhteinen (lit. 'The Grief of a Person is Shared'), came out in 1974, and her first novel, Seth Mattsonin tarina ('The Story of Seth Mattson'), in 1976.

Her perhaps best-known work is Helene (2003), a novel about the life of the Finnish artist Helene Schjerfbeck, which won the 2004 Runeberg Prize. It formed the basis of the 2020 film by the same name, directed by Antti Jokinen and starring Laura Birn as Schjerfbeck, which was nominated for an award in the feature-length category at the Shanghai International Film Festival.

Her latest novel, Valaanluiset koskettimet (2020) ('Whale Bone Keys') is strongly autobiographical.

Her other notable works include the novel Punainen ruukku ('Red Pot') (1980), and the essay collection Sininen kala ('Blue Fish') (1999).

== Awards and honours ==
In 2004, Liehu won the Runeberg Prize with Helene.

In 2006, she was awarded the Pro Finlandia medal of the Order of the Lion of Finland.

In 2008, Liehu received the Finnish State Literature Prize (Kirjallisuuden valtionpalkinto).

== Personal life ==
Aged five, Rakel Liehu contracted pneumonia, which killed her younger sister. She herself survived, but suffered from resultant ill health all her childhood, missing much of school while needing to convalesce; it was during that time that she became interested in poetry.

Liehu graduated from the University of Helsinki in 1963, after which she worked briefly as a teacher of Finnish and history at a secondary school in Raahe.

She was married until the death of her husband in 2008, with three children. Liehu lives in the Kruununhaka district of central Helsinki.
