= Helene (2020 film) =

- Directed by: Antti Jokinen
- Written by: Antti J. Jokinen; Marko Leino
- Based on: Helene by Rakel Liehu
- Produced by: Mikko Tenhunen; Antti J. Jokinen
- Starring: Laura Birn; Johannes Holopainen; Krista Kosonen; Pirkko Saisio; Eero Aho; Jarkko Lahti; Saana Koivisto
- Cinematography: Rauno Ronkainen
- Edited by: Benjamin Mercer
- Music by: Kirka Sainio
- Production company: Cinematic
- Distributed by: Nordisk Film
- Release date: 17 January 2020
- Running time: 122 minutes
- Country: Finland
- Language: Finnish
- Budget: €2,290,500

Helene is a 2020 Finnish historical drama film directed by Antti Jokinen. The film stars Laura Birn as the titular Finnish painter Helene Schjerfbeck. It is based on the Rakel Liehu’s Runeberg Prize-winning novel of the same name, adapted for the screen by Jokinen and Marko Leino.

The film was released on 17 January 2020 and became the most-watched movie in Finland for three consecutive weeks, attracting over 100,000 viewers within its first two weeks.

== Cast ==
- Laura Birn as Helene Schjerfbeck
- Johannes Holopainen as Einar Reuter
- Krista Kosonen as Helena Westermarck
- Pirkko Saisio as Olga Schjerfbeck
- Eero Aho as Magnus Schjerfbeck
- Jarkko Lahti as Gösta Stenman
- Saana Koivisto as Tyra Arp

== Reception ==
The decision to produce the film in Finnish rather than Swedish, the primary language of its historical subjects, sparked some debate. Art historian Pontus Kyander suggested boycotting the film due to the language choice.

Episodi magazine praised Laura Birn's performance, Rauno Ronkainen’s cinematography, and Kirka Sainio's music. However, some critics, such as Juho Typpö of Helsingin Sanomat, noted the film lacked dramatic and lighter elements, and felt its depiction of Schjerfbeck's inner struggles was incomplete.
