= Pearls and Pigs =

Helmiä ja sikoja
- DVD cover
- Directed by: Perttu Leppä
- Written by: Perttu Leppä
- Produced by: Jarkko Hentula
- Starring: Mikko Leppilampi, Unto Helo, Amanda Pilke, Laura Birn
- Production company: Talent House
- Distributed by: Columbia TriStar Nordisk Film Distributors
- Release dates: 19 August 2003 (Espoo); 29 August 2003 (Finland)
- Running time: 113 minutes
- Country: Finland
- Language: Finnish

Helmiä ja sikoja (English: Pearls and Pigs) is a 2003 Finnish comedy film directed and written by Perttu Leppä, and starring Mikko Leppilampi and Laura Birn.

== Plot ==
When the Hirvonen brother's (Läde, Timo, Ruho and Poju) bootlegging father ends up in jail, his sons need money to pay his debts to local crooks. The brothers suddenly get a new family member when their stepsister, Saara, moves in with them. Soon they find out Saara has an outstanding singing voice and the boys come up with an idea to send her to a child star contest. A former child star, a current pub rose, is employed to train the girl.

== Cast ==
- Mikko Leppilampi – Läde
- Laura Birn – Laura
- Amanda Pilke – Saara
- Unto Helo – Timo
- Timo Lavikainen – Ruho
- Konsta Hiekkanen – Poju
- Pekka Valkeejärvi – Ukko
- Outi Mäenpää – Saaran mutsi (Saara's mother)
- Antti Reini – Lauran miesystävä (Laura's boyfriend)
- Antti Virmavirta – Sika
- Tomi Salmela – Limppu
- Sakari Kuosmanen – Lehikoinen
- Matti Onnismaa – Mutsin miesystävä (Saara's mother's boyfriend)
- Risto Salmi – Alkon myyjä (Alko salesman)
- Marko Tiusanen – Ulosottomies (bailiff)
