= Nymphs (TV series) =

Finnish fantasy-drama television series

- Genre: Fantasy; Drama
- Directed by: Miikko Oikkonen; Teemu Nikki
- Starring: Sara Soulié; Manuela Bosco; Rebecca Viitala; Ilkka Villi; Jarkko Niemi
- Country of origin: Finland
- Original language: Finnish
- No. of seasons: 1
- No. of episodes: 12

Original release
- Network: MTV3 (Finland); AVA (Finland)
- Release: 24 March 2014

Nymphs (Finnish: Nymfit) is a Finnish fantasy-drama television series. The series is based on Greek mythology as the beautiful and immortal nymphs are living in a modern-day Helsinki. The nymphs need to have sex once a month in order to stay alive and run away from satyrs that persecute them.

Gummerus is publishing Nymfit as a book series. The first part of the book was written by Sari Luhtanen and Miikko Oikkonen and was titled Nymfit – Montpellierin legenda (Nymphs – The Legend of Montpellier). The Finnish version of the book was published August 29, 2013 in Finland. The translation rights have been sold internationally.

== Cast ==
- Sara Soulié as Didi Tasson
- Manuela Bosco as Nadia Rapaccini
- Rebecca Viitala as Kati Ordana
- Ilkka Villi as Erik Mann
- Jarkko Niemi as Samuel Koski
- Malla Malmivaara as Frida Fredriksdottir
- Pelle Heikkilä as Jesper
- Svante Martin as Kari Harju
- Lauri Tilkanen as Mitchell Brannegan
- Robin Svartström as Valtteri Vaara
- Hannes Mikkelsson as Lucas Pascal
- Kai Vaine as Heikki Hannula
- Elina Vehkaoja as Laura Maasalo
- Ville Virtanen as Matias van der Haas
- Johanna af Schultén as Elina Tiensuu
- Jemina Sillanpää as Jamila
- Esko Roine as Roland Gyllen
- Mikko Leppilampi as Gabriel Korda
- Max Ovaska as Johannes Metso
- Outi Condit as Rose
- Miina Turunen as Lecturer
- Amira Khalifa as Aurelia
- Minka Kuustonen as Jessica
- Jasmin Hamid as Ana-Claudia
