= Jüri Reinvere =

Estonian composer, poet and essayist (born 1971)

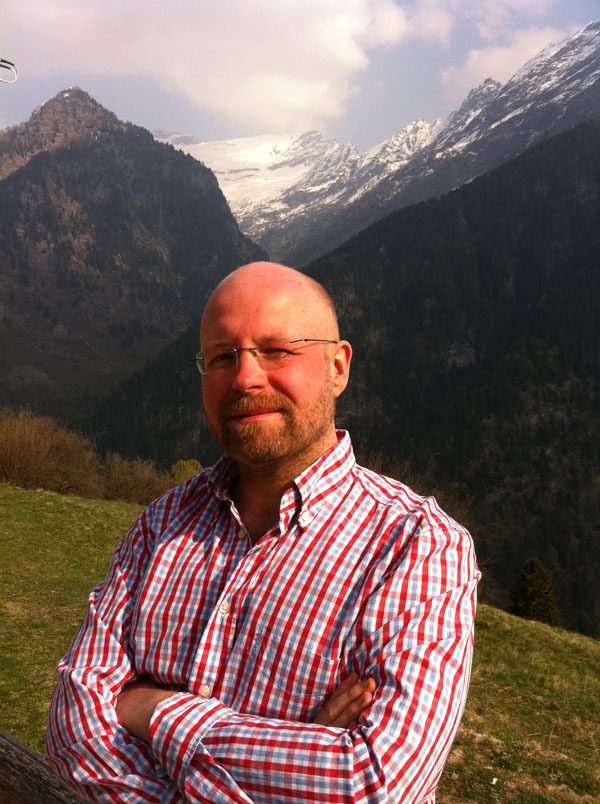
Jüri Reinvere. In Ticino, Switzerland 2011

Jüri Reinvere (born December 2, 1971, in Tallinn) is an Estonian composer, poet and essayist who has been living in Germany since 2005. Jüri Reinvere's polystylistic art is often devoted to existential themes of history, nature, politics and the poetics of human perception. His poetry and music theatre works are based on psychological observation and are often accompanied by theological allusions. His essays in Postimees and in Frankfurter Allgemeine Zeitung on current cultural and political affairs and have been awarded with prizes for journalism in Estonia. His music has received international attention through conductors such as Andris Nelsons, Paavo Järvi, Franz Welser-Möst, Pablo Heras-Casado, Manfred Honeck, Juraj Valcuha or Pietari Inkinen and through orchestras such as the Berlin Philharmonic, the Cleveland Orchestra, the Leipzig Gewandhaus Orchestra, Bamberg Symphony and the Bavarian Radio Symphony Orchestra. In 2025 he was awarded the OPUS Klassik as Composer of the Year.

== Life ==
Jüri Reinvere grew up in Tallinn during the Soviet Union. He attended the Tallinn Music High School from 1979 to 1990. His first composition teacher was Lepo Sumera.

From 1990 to 1992 Reinvere studied composition at the Fryderyk-Chopin-Music-Academy in Warsaw. From 1992 to 2005 he lived in Finland. From 1994 onwards, he studied composition with Veli-Matti Puumala and Tapio Nevanlinna at the Sibelius Academy in Helsinki, earning a master's degree in 2004. In addition, he worked as an organist and as a radio essayist for Finnish and Estonian radio stations, wrote occasional scripts for documentary films and was also employed as a TV producer.

In 1993 he met the Estonian-Swedish pianist and writer Käbi Laretei, who Reinvere himself calls his most important mentor. For a decade and a half, he remained in close contact with her and her former husband, the Swedish film and theatre director Ingmar Bergman. Bergman introduced Reinvere to the tradition of Ibsen’s and Strindberg’s Northern-European drama and to the psychological characterization of dramatic figures. Reinvere’s first prose works were soon followed by poetry written in English. This paved the way for writing his own libretti for his operas Puhdistus (Purge) in Finnish and "Peer Gynt" and "Minona" in German.

In 2000 he won the International Rostrum of Composers, the composition award of the UNESCO’s International Music Council; the same body honored him again in 2006. From 2000 to 2001 he held a fellowship at the Berlin Academy of Arts. In 2005 Reinvere moved to Berlin, Germany, and since 2017 he has been living in Frankfurt am Main. Reinvere is a Finnish citizen.

== Works ==
Reinvere’s aesthetics have two aspects: on the one hand, decided modernism with harsh sound, and romanticism on the other. His large-scale works, especially the operas, take a middle path between the two aspects. Reinvere often combines advanced methods of sound production with classical narrative structures. The development of the work’s form references thematic opening toward other art forms, questions of theology, politics, general history and everyday life. The main focus remains on the immediate, sensual presence of art.

=== Orchestral works ===
Reinvere's orchestral works use the orchestra as an integral sound body in the sense of the symphonic tradition and develop further the techniques of wordless narration. A major role plays operating with tension gradients in harmony. The poetic titles open up spaces for association, rather than providing a program. They sometimes make references to specific people (Maria Anna Mozart, in "Maria Anna, Awake, in the Next Room“), to landscapes ("The Inner Sea") or to astronomic phenomena such as the Boötes Void ("On the Dying of the Stars").

=== Stage works: operas and ballets ===
Reinvere first worked in Germany in 2000 and 2001, mainly in cooperation with the choreographer Michaela Fünfhause on the ballets "Dialog I", "Luft-Wasser-Erde-Feuer-Luft" and his radio opera "The Opposite Shore".

Ten years after the ballets, Reinvere reworked the bestseller novel "Puhdistus" by Sofi Oksanen into an opera with his own libretto. The world premiere took place in 2012 at the Finnish National Opera in Helsinki.

Peer Gynt was subsequently commissioned by the Norwegian National Opera in Oslo and its artistic director Per Boye Hansen. He traces Henrik Ibsen’s drama and questions the importance of national symbols today. The world premiere took place on November 29, 2014. The opera was met with large media response, due to its connotation of the 2011 Norway attacks committed by Anders Behring Breivik and its dealing with topics such as euthanasia and the lassitude of Western culture. Reinvere received the Estonian State Award for “Peer Gynt” in 2015.

Reinvere wrote his third opera "Minona" for the Beethoven year 2020. It tells the story of Minona von Stackelberg (1813-1897), who was officially the daughter of Josephine von Stackelberg (née Josephine Brunsvik), and her second husband Christoph von Stackelberg. However, in Beethoven research it is considered very likely that Ludwig van Beethoven could be Minona's biological father. Minona von Stackelberg grew up in Reinvere's hometown of Tallinn (then Reval). Reinvere undertook his own research for the libretto in the Archives of the Baltic Knights in Tartu, where part of the Stackelberg family estate is kept. The premiere took place at the Theater Regensburg.

=== Works based on Reinvere’s own poetry ===
Since the creation of t.i.m.e for solo flute and narrators (2005), Reinvere’s non-theatrical works have often also been settings of his own poetry, mostly written originally in English. He writes in free verse while still featuring meters and rhyme forms. His language alludes to literary history, especially in a series of poems based on English Romantic authors. Thus, "Norilsk, the Daffodils" (for orchestra and narrator) makes reference to William Wordsworth, "The Empire of May" (for chamber ensemble and voice) to John Keats and "The Arrival at the Ligurian Sea" (for solo flute and chamber ensemble) to Percy Bysshe Shelley.

His 2009 Requiem (for chamber choir, solo flute and narrator) deals with death and dying in today’s world. The cycle "Four Quartets" combines his own poems with string quartets and follows T. S. Eliot’s work of the same title. Reinvere sets out to turn concrete life places into symbols of human existence. In the pre-recorded tape for the first of the "Four Quartets", Reinvere uses original sound documents from the maternity ward’s delivery room at the Central Hospital in Tallinn.

In addition to the cycle for soprano and orchestra "Songs in the Fading Light", Reinvere's vocal music also include the cycle "Pale Carnival“ for soprano and piano, to his own German and English texts, written for the Kissinger Liederwerkstatt 2018, and also two songs for bass and piano to own poems, which are inspired by the prints of the Estonian symbolist Eduard Wiiralt. These were composed for the Mozarteum Salzburg in 2023.

=== Choral works ===
Reinvere's most important choral work to date, apart from the early work "Frost at Midnight”, is the 45-minutes long oratorio "The Expulsion of Ishmael“, based on his own text. It was written for the RIAS Chamber Choir Berlin and tells the biblical story of the expulsion of the maid Hagar and her son Ishmael by his father Abraham and thus the separation of Judaism and Islam. The premiere took place in March 2022 in Berlin with the RIAS Chamber Choir and the Ensemble Resonance under the direction of Justin Doyle.

=== Further works ===
In Reinvere’s other works he often combines various techniques and genres, for example the incorporation of documentary material into aesthetically through-composed music by means of Musique concrète. His "Livonian Lament" (2003) uses sound recordings from the Livonian Coast, commemorating the slow death of the Livonian language. Later works maintain such tonal conceptions, but they are less obvious. Often, Reinvere does entirely without the links of tonality, relying on instrumental and vocal sounds and the sound of narration, closer to noise than to precisely defined pitch.

Since 2016, Reinvere has been writing more instrumental works in classical settings. These include his Piano Quartet, his Sonata for Cello and Piano (premiered in 2019 by David Geringas and Ian Fountain), a cycle of nocturnes (for organ, piano and viola solo), a Saxophone Quartet, a Clarinet Quintet and a chamber miniature with the instrumentation of Franz Schubert's Trout Quintet titled "Fleeting, Forever". His Quartet for Violin, Clarinet, Cello and Piano had its premiere at the International Jerusalem Chamber Music Festival in September 2022.

Although Reinvere himself states that Beethoven's music has always been him less important than e.g. the music of Karol Szymanowski, his biographical preoccupation with Beethoven inspired him to write two further works: "The Crown of Gneixendorf" (for solo shawn, premiered at the Ultrasound Festival in Berlin by Katharina Bäuml in 2017) and the concert "Inter lacrimas et luctum“ for Cello and Ensemble (premiered by Jean-Guihen Queyras and the Ensemble Modern in 2019). All the works related to Beethoven centre around the idea of the failure of an idealistic life plan and of the vulnerability in contrast to the heroic image of Beethoven.

=== Essays ===
Reinvere’s essays deal with the verbal and non-verbal transmission of thoughts and feelings, as well as the manipulation or even destruction of cultural memory. These topics mainly reflect his own biography and the life of Reinvere’s Estonian forebears, but he also discusses the general condition of Europe and the USA. Drawing upon his experiences in Finnish parish life and his life in cities such as Berlin, Moscow, London, Florence and Warsaw, Reinvere also investigates phenomena such as consolation, grace or beauty. The proximity of squalor and sublimity, similar to the themes of Fyodor Dostoyevsky writings, appears in Reinvere’s essays and in his poetry.

Since November 2013, Reinvere has occasionally contributed opinion pieces on current events to the daily German newspaper Frankfurter Allgemeine Zeitung. There, he questioned in principle whether Western strategies were likely to improve the situation of sexual minorities in Russia. In another article, Reinvere described the fears of Russian intervention in the Baltic States after the annexation of Crimea in 2014 as based on the yet-unresolved experiences of 1939/40 and the period after 1990.

Lately, his articles for the FAZ have been about strategies of the Soviet and post-Soviet factionalism in the interplay between inner political conflicts and Western attention. Since 2016 he has also commented cultural-analytical and political issues for the national leading daily paper “Postimees” as well as for the Estonian weekly paper “Sirp”. For his annotations in the latter, he received the annual Enn Soosaar Award, now known as the Ethical Essayists Award, in Tallinn in 2017. Postimees selected Reinvere as Opinion Leader of the Year 2022 and awarded him the Jaan Tõnisson Prize in 2023.

== Musical works (selection) ==
- Puhdistus (Purge), opera based on the novel of the same title by Sofi Oksanen
- Peer Gynt, opera based on play by Henrik Ibsen (2014)
- Minona, opera based on the libretto of the composer (2020)
- The Opposite Shore (Radio-Opera, 2003)
- Luft-Wasser-Erde-Feuer-Luft (for the Michaela Fünfhausen's Ballet “The Feathered Serpent”, 2003)
- Written in the Sand (for symphony orchestra, 2001)
- Norilsk, the Daffodils (for symphony orchestra and spoken word from the tape, 2012)
- Through A Lens Darkly (for large orchestra, 2018)
- And tired of happiness, they started to dance (for large orchestra, 2018)
- Before Leviathan Awakes (for large orchestra, 2019)
- Maria Anna, Awake, in the Next Room (Notturno for orchestra, 2021)
- On the Dying of Stars (for large orchestra, 2021)
- Bosom of Immense Light (for large orchestra, 2022)
- On the Ship of Fools (for large orchestra, 2023)
- Requiem (for solo flute and four male voices, with video, 2009)
- The Expulsion of Ishmael (for mixed choir and strings, 2020)
- Lieder bei schwindendem Licht. Five poems for soprano and orchestra (2016)
- Double Concerto for two flutes, string orchestra and drums (2016)
- Inter Lacrimas et Luctum. Concerto for cello and ensemble (2019)
- Four Quartets I-IV (for string quartet and narrator from tape, 2012-2024)
- Frost at Midnight (for bass flute and chorus, 2008)
- The Empire of May (for chamber ensemble, 2010)
- Northwest Bow (for chamber ensemble, 1998)
- Livonian Lament (tape, 2003)
- t.i.m.e. (for solo flute and electronics, with video, 2005)
- Causerie des confiseurs. Miniatures for eight pianos and sixteen hands (2016)
- Sonata for cello and piano (2019)

== Awards (selected) ==
- International Rostrum of Composers 2000
- UNESCO Music Council 2006
- Prizes of the Cultural Endowment of Estonia 2012, 2018, 2020
- Estonian State Prize 2015
- Enn Soosaar Prize for Ethical Essays 2017
- Musician of the Year in Estonia 2022
- Order of the White Star (Republic of Estonia) 2022
- Jaan Tõnisson Prize as the Opinion Leader 2022
- OPUS Klassik as the Composer of the Year 2025

== Discography ==
- 2009 a second...a century
- 2010 Requiem (CD+DVD)
- 2024 Ship of Fools
