= Stripping (film) =

2002 film

- Directed by: Saara Saarela
- Written by: Vera Kiiskinen
- Produced by: Petri Jokiranta; Tero Kaukomaa; Saara Saarela
- Starring: Liisa Kuoppamäki
- Cinematography: Peter Flinckenberg
- Edited by: Kimmo Kohtamäki
- Music by: Jarmo Saari
- Release dates: 25 June 2002 (Moscow); 16 August 2002 (Finland)
- Running time: 74 minutes
- Country: Finland
- Language: Finnish

Stripping (Finnish: Hengittämättä & nauramatta) is a 2002 Finnish comedy film directed by Saara Saarela. It was entered into the 24th Moscow International Film Festival.

== Cast ==
- Liisa Kuoppamäki as Inka
- Meri Nenonen as Helena
- Marc Gassot as Arno
- Johan Storgård as Luukas
- Tiina Pirhonen
- Mikko Nousiainen as Joonas
- Aarni Ahjolinna
- Elina Knihtilä
- Janne Hyytiäinen
- Laura Birn as Kaupan kassa
