= Jimi Constantine =

Finnish musician and actor (born 1981)

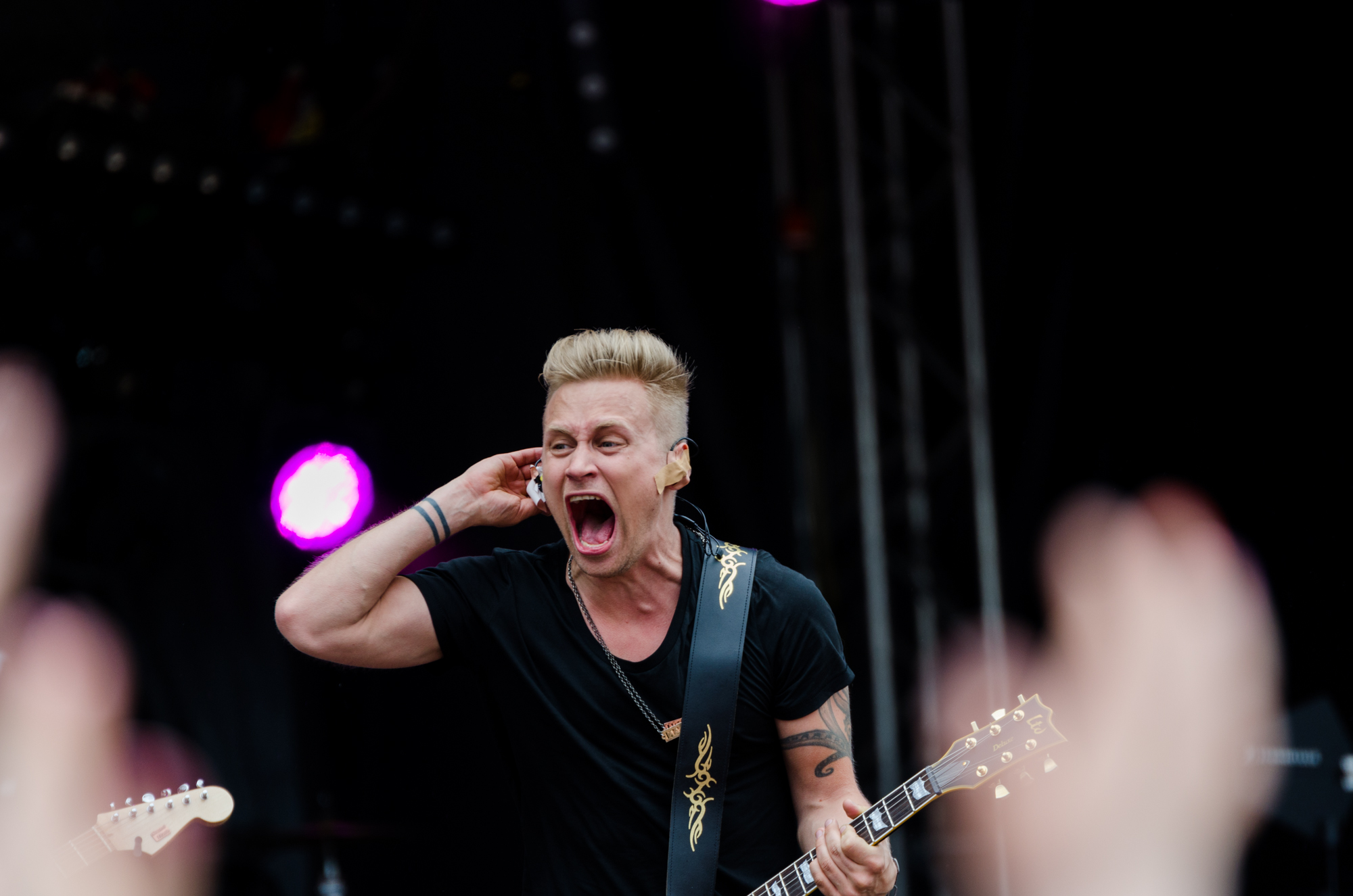
- Constantine performing in 2014

Background information
- Also known as: Jimi Pääkallo
- Born: Konstantinos Jorma Hiekkanen; 31 December 1981 (age 44); Finland
- Genres: Rock; pop rock; pop
- Occupation: Musician
- Instruments: Vocals; guitar
- Years active: 1998—present
- Labels: Helsinkirecords; HMC
- Formerly of: Tyrävyö; Cliché; Technicolour

Jimi Constantine (born Konstantinos Jorma Hiekkanen, 31 December 1981) is a Finnish musician and actor. He was previously the vocalist and guitarist of the band Technicolour and has also played with the bands Tyrävyö, Cliché, and Kalle Päätalo. His previous artist name was Jimi Pääkallo. Constantine is also an actor, having appeared in the films A Long Hot Summer (1999), Pearls and Pigs (2003), and 8 Days to Premiere (2008), as well as the TV series Kallio (2010) and Salatut elämät (2000 & 2011).

In 2008, Constantine participated in the Tanssii tähtien kanssa, Finland's version of the British show Strictly Come Dancing, and Suomen Pelkokerroin, the Finnish version of Fear Factor. He also took part in the 2011 Eurovision Song Contest with his song "Party to Party", but did not qualify.

== Discography ==
=== Solo ===
Studio albums

- Elämä Suomessa (2017)

Singles

- "Dirty Cinderella" (2010)
- "Party to Party" (2010)
- "Beautiful Things" (2011)
- "Rakkauden Nimeen" (2017)

Other contributions

- Pearls and Pigs (2003)
- Kallio (2010)
- Uuden Musiikin Kilpailu (2016)
- Nieminen & Lahtinen Show (2016)
- Vain elämää (2017)
- Kingi (2018)

=== Technicolour ===
Studio albums

- Way Out (2003)
- Only Shadows Dance (2005)
- People (2006)

=== Tyrävyö ===
Studio albums

- Helminauha (1999)
- Tyrävyö (2001)
- Pelkoa, inhoa ja b-luokan elokuvaa (2002)
- Lähempänä pohjaa (2005)
- Elämänpaneeli (2015)

EPs

- Kavereita (1999)
- Uskoin niin (2002)

=== Cliché ===
Studio albums

- Twilightin (2000)
