= Promise (2005 film) =

Finnish war drama film

- Finnish: Lupaus
- Directed by: Ilkka Vanne
- Written by: Inkeri Kilpinen; Elina Halttunen
- Produced by: Asko Apajalahti
- Starring: Laura Birn; Karoliina Vanne; Hanna Lekander
- Music by: Tuomas Kantelinen
- Release date: 2 December 2005
- Running time: 1h 52min
- Country: Finland
- Language: Finnish

Promise (Finnish: Lupaus) is a 2005 Finnish war drama film directed by Ilkka Vanne. Set during the Winter War (1939–1940) and the Continuation War (1941–1944), it follows several characters who served in Lotta Svärd, a Finnish auxiliary paramilitary organisation for women.

The film received 154,740 viewers during its theatrical run.

== Plot ==
In the spring of 1939, Mona Moisio dreams of leaving her home farm in Porkkala, Finland, to study veterinary medicine in Oslo, Norway. However, her parents, Helmer and Lilli, do not agree to this. Mona's older sister, Anna, is planning a wedding and starting a family with her future husband, law student Lasse Edelmann. Ruth Limnell is studying theology at university. However, her plans change when her homeland calls; all three make their vows and leave for the Karelian Isthmus when the Winter War breaks out. Mona's decision to become a volunteer is confirmed when she hears a civil protection bulletin on the radio, and she goes to Helsinki to save the archives of Helmer's business premises. However, the first air raid on Helsinki occurs at the same time. Mona serves in veterinary medicine, Anna in air surveillance, and Ruth in a field hospital. Ruth has experience working at the nursing home in Hamina, so before long, she is asked to help Grandma Anni prepare the remains of those who died in the war for burial. Mona's colleague at the field horse hospital, shoemaker Ollinen, is initially skeptical of her but soon has to give her credit.

Mona meets her future husband, Ensign and later Lieutenant Veikko Vuori, during the Winter War. Vuori is a mission officer, and his assistant is Ville Sorvali from the village of Kansola in Nuijamaa. Ville develops a liking for Ruth. One day, Mona is about to go home, when a conscript sexually assaults her. During the incident, a horse stable catches fire. Mona saves the life of her assailant after he hits his head and loses consciousness. Before this, Mona had another difficult experience when her neighbor's son Axel, who was wounded in battle, dies in her arms during Christmas. Anna is captured by Soviet soldiers while performing air surveillance duties, and her partner Liisa Hakkarainen is injured and killed with a bayonet. Anna does not return home until the following summer of 1940, just when the home troops' hope of her return has almost completely faded. Anna and Lasse celebrate their wedding.

The Continuation War breaks out in June 1941, and women go to the front again. This time, Anna no longer goes to air control but works in a telephone exchange. She is expecting a child but has a miscarriage. Towards the end of the war, she goes to Degerö for searchlight training, where she is also taught how to use the Carcano rifle. Anna is killed after receiving a bullet in the chest on the last day of the war. Mona occasionally keeps in touch with Lieutenant Vuori by letter during the war, and after it ends, they get married. Ruth also writes letters with Sergeant Ville Sorvali, but he is killed in the war. Lasse loses one of his legs. After the war, Ruth decides to study to become a doctor.

The film's final scene is set in 1956. Mona and her family return to their home farm in Porkkala. She now has a daughter, named Anna, and she receives an heirloom from her mother, which has changed hands several times during the film. In the meantime, Veikko has hoisted the Finnish flag on the flagpole.

== Cast ==
- Laura Birn as Mona Moisio
- Karoliina Vanne as Anna Moisio
- Hanna Lekander as Ruth Limnell
- Pertti Sveholm as Helmer Moisio
- Miitta Sorvali as Lilli Moisio
- Turkka Mastomäki as Lasse Edelmann
- Hannes Suominen as Alex
- Ilkka Villi as Veikko Vuori
- Kari Hietalahti as Ville Sorvali
- Anja Pohjola as Fanni Luukkonen
