= Naked Harbour =

2012 film

- Film poster
- Finnish: Vuosaari
- Directed by: Aku Louhimies
- Written by: Aku Louhimies, Mikko Kouki, Niina Repo
- Starring: Sean Pertwee; Amanda Pilke
- Cinematography: Tuomo Hutri
- Edited by: Benjamin Mercer
- Music by: Markus Koskinen
- Production company: First Floor Productions
- Distributed by: Buena Vista International
- Release date: 3 February 2012
- Running time: 123 minutes
- Country: Finland
- Language: Finnish

Naked Harbour (Finnish: Vuosaari) is a 2012 Finnish drama film directed by Aku Louhimies.

== Synopsis ==
The film takes place in Vuosaari, the easternmost suburb of Helsinki, Finland. The plot revolves around several families, around which love plays a theme in the midst of very adverse interpersonal relationships.

== Cast ==
- Sean Pertwee as Robert
- Amanda Pilke as Milla
- Jasper Pääkkönen as Anders
- Laura Birn as Iiris
- Mikko Kouki as Pertti
- Lenna Kuurmaa as Viivi
- Taneli Mäkelä as Milla's father
- Matleena Kuusniemi as Sara
- Deogracias Masomi as Make
