= Forbidden Fruit (2009 film) =

- Original Finnish film poster
- Directed by: Dome Karukoski
- Written by: Aleksi Bardy
- Produced by: Aleksi Bardy
- Starring: Marjut Maristo; Amanda Pilke
- Cinematography: Tuomo Hutri
- Edited by: Harri Ylönen
- Music by: Adam Nordén
- Production company: Helsinki-filmi
- Distributed by: Sandrew Metronome
- Release date: 13 February 2009 (Finland)
- Country: Finland
- Language: Finnish
- Budget: €1.4 million
- Box office: €924,916

Forbidden Fruit (Finnish: Kielletty hedelmä) is a 2009 Finnish drama film directed by Dome Karukoski. The film is about two teenage girls from a Conservative Laestadian community. The girls travel to Helsinki where they meet other people of their age and learn about their lifestyle that differs greatly from the girls' religious way of life.

The film won the Jussi Award for Best Supporting Actress (Amanda Pilke) in 2010.

== Cast ==
- Marjut Maristo as Raakel
- Amanda Pilke as Maria
- Malla Malmivaara as Eeva
- Joel Mäkinen as Toni
- Jarkko Niemi as Jussi
- Olavi Uusivirta as Johannes
- Timo Tikka as Luukas
- Jani Volanen as Ilari
- Teemu Ojanne as Mäki
- Heikki Nousiainen as Joki
- Tapio Liinoja as Laakso
- Tuija Töyräs as Raakel's mother
- Jouko Puolanto as Raakel's father
- Eeva Putro as Marian
