= Sofi Oksanen =

Finnish writer and playwright (born 1977)

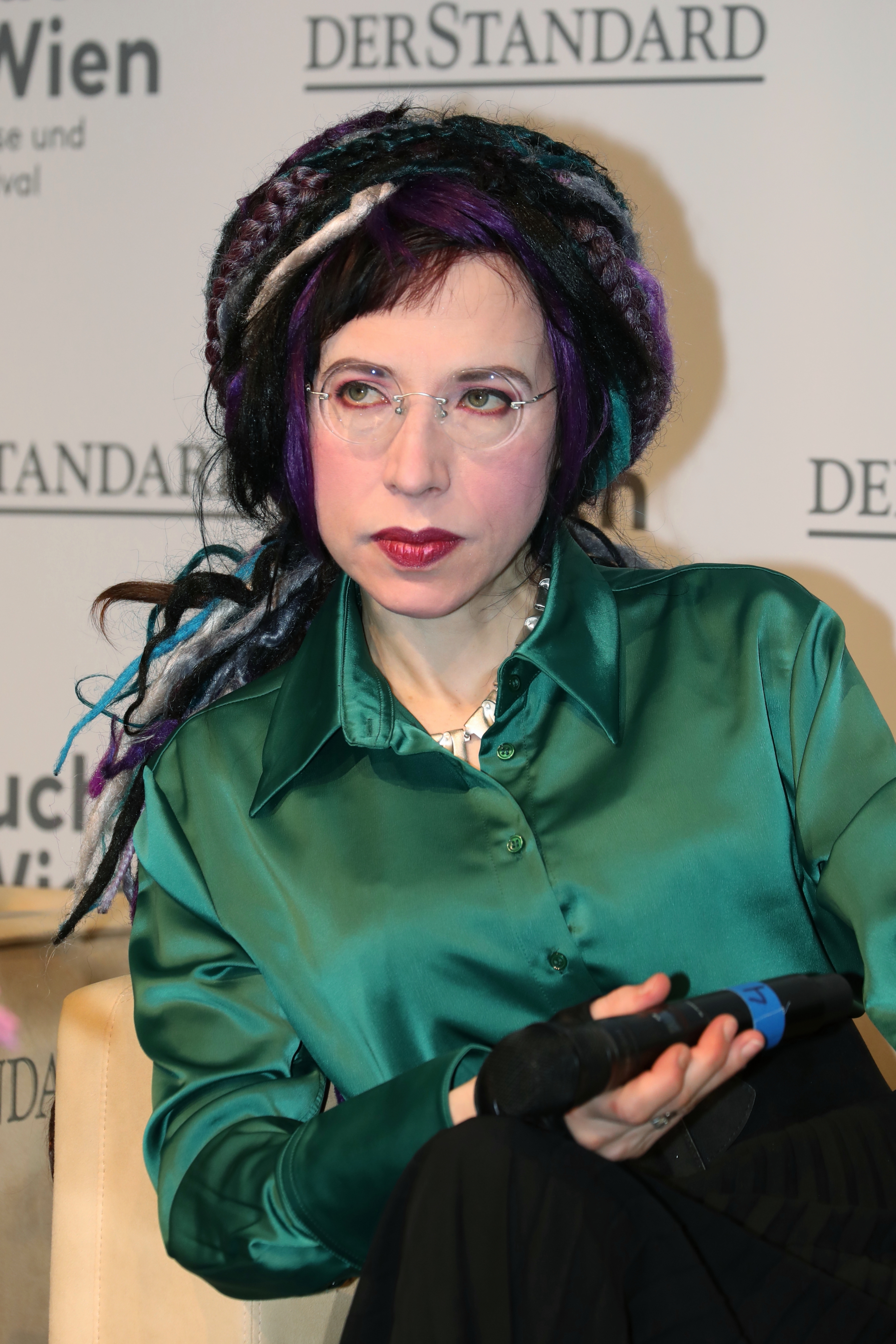
- Oksanen in 2022
- Born: Sofi-Elina Oksanen; 7 January 1977 (age 49); Jyväskylä, Finland
- Occupation: Writer
- Writing career
- Notable work: Purge

Sofi-Elina Oksanen (born 7 January 1977) is a Finnish writer and playwright. Oksanen has published six novels, of which "Purge" has gained the widest recognition. She has received several international and domestic awards for her literary work. Her work has been translated into more than 40 languages and sold more than two million copies. Oksanen has been called "Finnish-Estonian Charles Dickens" and her work has often been compared to Margaret Atwood's novels. Oksanen is actively involved in public debate in Finland and comments on current issues in her columns and various talk shows.

== Early years and education ==
Sofi-Elina Oksanen was born in Jyväskylä in central Finland, where she grew up in the Halssila district. Her father is a Finnish electrician. Her mother is an Estonian engineer who grew up in Estonia during the Soviet occupation and through marriage was able to move to Finland in the 1970s. Oksanen studied literature at the University of Jyväskylä and University of Helsinki and later drama at the Finnish Theatre Academy in Helsinki.

== Career ==
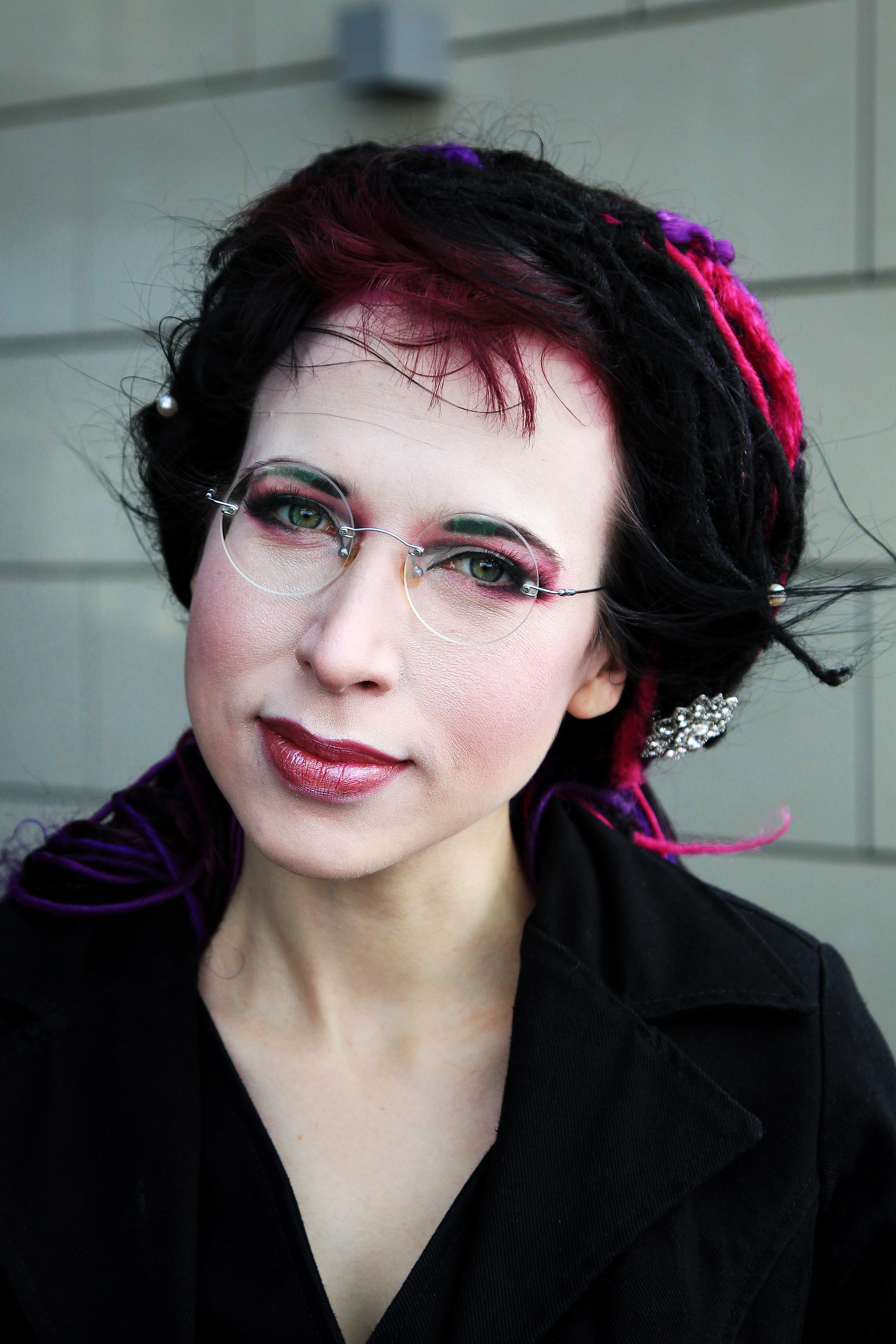
Oksanen in 2010

Oksanen's first play "Purge" (Puhdistus) was staged at the Finnish National Theatre in 2007. From out of the play grew Oksanen's third novel "Purge" (2008). It ranked number 1 on the bestseller list for fiction in Finland when it was published and has received numerous awards, both in Finland and abroad.

The play "Purge'" had its American première at La MaMa Experimental Theatre Club, in New York City, on 10 February 2011. The text was translated by Eva Buchwald and the production was directed by Zishan Ugurlu.

From October 2011, the play was produced in 15 countries, with productions in Norway, France, Portugal, Spain, Sweden, Iceland, Lithuania, Germany, Ukraine, and Hungary. It premiered in London at the Arcola Theatre from 22 February to 24 March with a new production directed by Elgiva Field. In Canada it premiered in 2021.

The novel has been adapted into a film – see "Purge" (2012) – directed by Antti Jokinen, selected as the Finnish entry for the Best Foreign Language Oscar at the 85th Academy Awards.

"Purge" was adapted into an opera, composed by Jüri Reinvere, and it premiered at Finnish National Opera in 2012.

Her novel "Baby Jane" has also been adapted into an opera "Baby Jane". The composer is Markus Kärki. Helsingin Sanomat called it an opera event of the season.

In 2012, Oksanen published a map of Soviet Gulag prison camps, drawn by Niilo Koljonen, in the National Audiovisual Archive.

Her fourth novel "When the Doves Disappeared" (Kun kyyhkyset katosivat) was published on 31 August 2012 and it was the most sold Finnish novel of the year. The title refers to German soldiers catching and eating all the pigeons in Tallinn during the Nazi German occupation of Estonia during World War II.

The book was translated into English by Lola Rogers: "When the Doves Disappeared: A novel". (Knopf, 2015. ISBN 978-0-385-35017-4.)

Oksanen wrote a libretto for Kaija Saariaho's opera "Innocence." The world premiere was scheduled for 2020 at the Royal Opera House, Covent Garden, in London, but was postponed due to the Covid-19 pandemic. The opera had its world premiere on 3 July 2021 at the Grand Théâtre de Provence as part of the Festival d'Aix-en-Provence. The opera was called a "triumph" and a "masterpiece" in the press, and its international reception was overwhelmingly positive. Le Monde said it already has a place in the history of opera. Oksanen's libretto was described masterly, innovative, palpitating and thrilling. Les Echos reviewed the libretto perfect for stage and said: "From the libretto to the staging, everything promises this dark and strong work a great future in the biggest international theatres." The magazine "Transfuge" praised Oksanen's libretto for it remarkable format and chilling efficiency: "Each character has its identity, its language, its drama, its specter." After the world premiere the opera will travel to Finland's National Opera, Dutch National Opera, Royal Opera House (Covent Garden) and San Francisco Opera House.

Oksanen has also written numerous articles published in international newspapers. The topics are often related to freedom of speech, women's rights, Russian politics, information war, immigration and Finlandization. In 2014, Die Welt published her article about information war from the point of view of former Eastern Bloc countries.

Her novel, "Norma", translated by Owen F. Witesman, was published in English by Knopf in the US, Atlantic in the UK and House of Anansi in Canada.

Oksanen's novel "The Dog Park" came out in English in 2021 published by Knopf in the US, Atlantic in the UK and House of Anansi in Canada. The translator was Owen F. Witesman.

Two of her novels have been adapted into movies, "Purge" and "Baby Jane". The movie rights for "When the Doves Disappeared" and "Stalin's Cows" have been acquired.

== Personal life ==
Sofi Oksanen and her husband, Juha Korhonen, were married in 2011 in Helsinki.

== Works ==
Novels

- Stalin's Cows (original title Stalinin lehmät, published in Finnish 2003)
- Baby Jane (original title Baby Jane, published in Finnish 2005)
- Purge (original title Puhdistus, published in Finnish 2008)
- When the Doves Disappeared (original title Kun Kyyhkyset katosivat, published in Finnish 2012)
- Norma (original title Norma, published in Finnish 2015)
- The Dog Park (original title Koirapuisto, published in Finnish 2019)

Non-fiction

- Same River, Twice: Putin's War on Women – A Feminist Investigation of Sexual Violence, Genocide, and Threats to Democracy (original title 'Samaan virtaan – Putinin sota naisia vastaan', published in Finnish 2023)

Plays

- The Blue-cheeked girls (original title Siniposkiset tytöt, 2005)
- Purge (original title Puhdistus, the world premiere at the Finnish National Theatre, 2007)
- When the Doves Disappeared (original title Kun kyyhkyset katosivat, the world premiere at the Finnish National Theatre, 2013)
- I love you already (original title Rakastan sinua jo nyt, 2017)

Lyrics/Poems

- Too short skirt – tales from the kitchen (original title Liian lyhyt hame - kertomuksia keittiöstä, 2011)

Libretto

- Innocence – opera by Kaija Saariaho, world premiere 2021 at the festival Aix-en-Provence

Essays in English

- A Lion in a Cage, Eurozine, 19.5.2015
- What's it like to write about Russia, 14.6.2016, UpNorth
- Your silence will not protect you, 28.2.2018, UpNorth
- My family knew all about iron curtain: it's vital to protect our right to speak out, The Guardian, 30.5.2018
- A Soviet shadow looms over the Putin-Trump summit in Helsinki, The Guardian, 11.7.2018
- Social media can work as life insurance for Navalny, Found Me, 5.2.2021

== Awards ==
- Finlandia Prize, Finland, 2008
- The Kristiina of the year, Kristiina-institute, Finland, 2008
- The Mika Waltari Award, Finland, 2008
- The Great Finnish Book Club Prize, Finland, 2008
- The SSKK Recognition Award, Finland, 2008
- The Kalevi Jäntti Award, Finland, 2008
- Runeberg Prize, Finland, 2009
- The Person of the Year, Postimees, Estonia, 2009
- The Order of the Cross of Terra Mariana, Estonia, 2010
- Nordic Council Literature Prize (2010) for Puhdistus
- The Prix Femina Ètranger, France, 2010
- The Prix du Roman FNAC, France, 2010
- The European Book Prize, EU, 2010
- The French Booksellers Prize, France, 2012
- The Order of the Lion of Finland, the Pro Finlandia, Finland, 2012
- The Budapest Grand Prize, Hungary, 2013
- The Swedish Academy Nordic Prize, Sweden, 2013
- Wolmar Schildt Award, Finland, 2015
- Premio Salerno Libro d'Europa, Italy, 2015
- Chevalier Medal of Honour by Ordre des Arts et des Lettres, France, 2018

Nominations

- The Helsingin Sanomat Prize for the best debutant novel, Finland, 2003
- Runeberg Prize, Finland, 2004
- Prix Médicis, France, 2010
- The Dublin International Literary Award (IMPAC), Ireland, 2012
- The Dublin International Literary Award (IMPAC), Ireland, 2017
- The Ambassador of Finnish Culture (The Culture Gala of the Century), Finland, 2017
- The New Academy Prize in Literature, Sweden, 2018
- Fedora Opera Prize, 2021
