= Technicolour (band) =

Finnish rock band

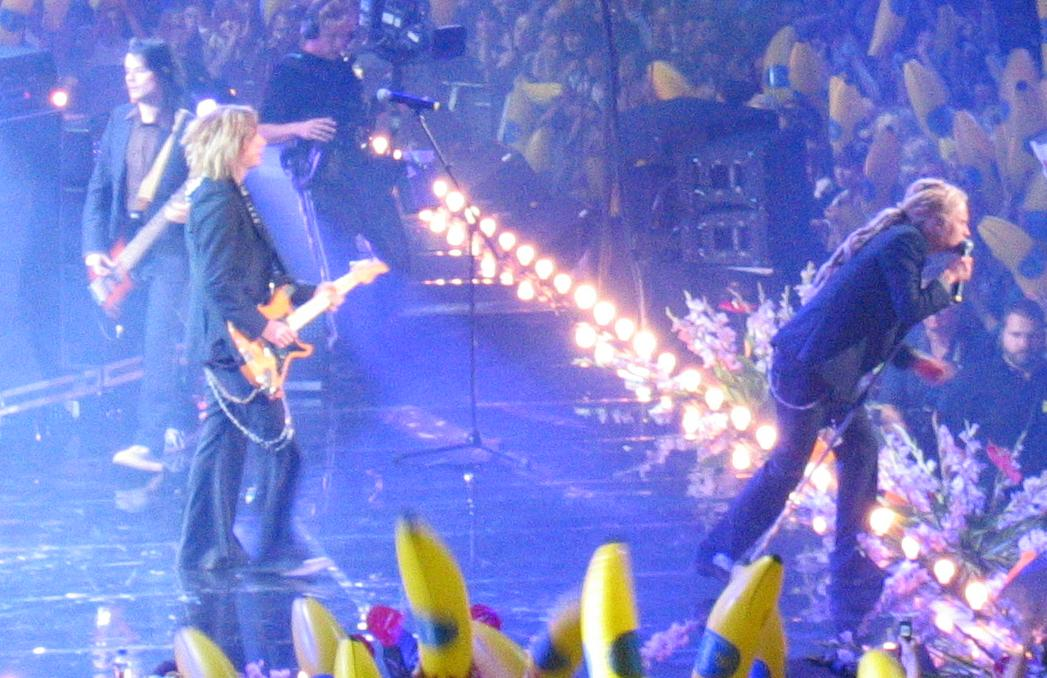
- Technicolour performing in 2006

Background information
- Origin: Helsinki, Finland
- Genres: Rock; pop rock
- Years active: 2001–2008; 2025–present
- Label: EMI
- Members: Jimi Pääkallo; Tuomas Keskinen; Toni Hintikka; Pasi Lemmetty
- Past members: Aki Räty

Technicolour is a Finnish rock band from Helsinki, founded by Jimi Pääkallo in 2001 and active until 2008. In 2025, they reformed and released two new singles.

The band's first album, Way Out, was released in September 2003, achieving moderate success. Their second record, Only Shadows Dance (2005), outperformed the first one, peaking at no. 11 on the album chart that year. Its singles "All My Life" and "Teach Me Love (I'm in Denial)" also ranked among the top ten on radio playlists. With their third album, People, released in October 2006, Technicolour's popularity waned again.

In May 2008, the band announced that they would go on hiatus, and in October of the same year, they officially broke up.

In 2025, Technicolour returned with the singles "Suvi" and "Yksinäiset sudet", which in contrast to their earlier material, were sung in Finnish.

== Band members ==
Current

- Jimi (Konstantinos Jorma "Konsta" Hiekkanen) – vocals
- Gary (Tuomas Keskinen) – guitar
- Toni Hintikka – bass
- Dingo (Pasi Lemmetty) – drums

Past

- Aki Räty – vocals, guitar

== Discography ==
=== Studio albums ===
- Way Out (2003)
- Only Shadows Dance (2005)
- People (2006)

=== Singles ===
- "One Night" (2003)
- "Fireflies" (2003)
- "Endless" (2004)
- "All My Life" (2005)
- "Teach Me Love" (I'm in Denial)" (2005)
- "Nowhere to Go" (2005)
- "Can I Get to Heaven" (2006)
- "Someday" (2006)
- "Michael Jackson" (2006)
- "Suvi" (2025)
- "Yksinäiset sudet" (2025)

=== Music videos ===
- "Fireflies" (2003)
- "Teach Me Love (I'm in Denial)" (2005)
- "Nowhere to Go" (2005)
- "Someday" (2006)
