= Michael Showers (actor) =

American actor (1966–2011)

- Born: March 14, 1966; Cincinnati, Ohio, United States
- Died: August 22, 2011 (aged 45); New Orleans, Louisiana, United States
- Occupation: Actor
- Years active: 2000–2011

Michael Showers (March 14, 1966 – August 22, 2011) was an American actor who was best known for his role as Captain John Guidry on the television series Treme.

== Death ==
On August 24, 2011, Showers' body was discovered in the Mississippi River near the French Quarter of New Orleans, Louisiana. New Orleans police speculated that Showers had been dead for at least two days when his body was found. Autopsy results confirmed that Showers' death was caused by drowning.

== Filmography ==
=== Film ===
- Traffic (2000) - Meeting Leader
- Immortally Yours (2007) - Jack Dougherty
- Mad Money (2008) - Detective (Uncredited)
- Soul Men (2008) - Detective in Charge
- I Love You Phillip Morris (2009) - Gary
- Wonderful World (2009) - Marty Rowe
- The Collector (2009) - Deputy Sheriff
- Tekken (2009) - Security Assistant #1
- The Resident (2011) - August ER Doctor
- The Tree of Life (2011) - Mr. Brown
- Love, Wedding, Marriage (2011) - Handsome Toothless Man
- Colombiana (2011) - Cop

=== Television ===
- Sordid Lives: The Series (2008) - Homeless Man (1 Episode)
- The Vampire Diaries (2010) - The Man (1 Episode)
- Treme (2011) - Captain John Guidry (4 Episodes)
