= The Resident (film) =

2011 film by Antti Jokinen

- Theatrical release poster
- Directed by: Antti Jokinen
- Written by: Antti Jokinen; Robert Orr; Erin Cressida Wilson
- Produced by: Simon Oakes; Cary Brokaw; Guy East; Nigel Sinclair
- Starring: Hilary Swank; Jeffrey Dean Morgan; Lee Pace; Aunjanue Ellis; Christopher Lee
- Cinematography: Guillermo Navarro
- Edited by: Bob Murawski; Stuart Levy
- Music by: John Ottman
- Production companies: Hammer Films; Exclusive Media Group
- Distributed by: Paramount Pictures; Icon Film Distribution
- Release date: 29 March 2011
- Running time: 91 minutes
- Country: United States
- Language: English
- Budget: $20 million

The Resident is a 2011 American thriller film directed by Antti Jokinen and starring Hilary Swank and Jeffrey Dean Morgan. Swank stars as a recently single woman who rents an apartment in New York City and comes to suspect that someone is stalking her. The film also features a cameo from Hammer Films star Christopher Lee, in his only collaboration with the studio after 1976's To the Devil a Daughter and before his death in 2015.

== Plot ==
Juliet Devereau, an emergency room physician, rents an apartment in New York City from Max. Juliet has recently filed for divorce from her husband Jack after she caught him having an affair, but she still has feelings for him. Unbeknownst to Juliet, someone is stalking her, observing her from across the street and apparently entering her apartment.

At a party, Juliet bumps into Max and flirts with him. As they walk home, Jack follows them from across the street. Juliet impulsively and awkwardly kisses Max, but then retreats after realizing she shouldn't have done it. They later go on a date. A flashback reveals that Max is the one stalking Juliet. He has rebuilt her apartment to include secret passageways and a two-way mirror, which he can use to watch her.

In another instance, Juliet and Max are in bed together and are about to have sex. However, Juliet feels guilty and asks Max to stop, admitting that she couldn't stop thinking about Jack. Eventually Juliet breaks off her romantic relationship with Max, saying that her kissing him and them almost having sex was a mistake and she was too caught up in her emotions to realize what she was doing because of her feelings for Jack. Max continues to observe Juliet and does strange activities in Juliet's apartment while she's at work (such as masturbating in her bathtub and brushing his teeth using Juliet's toothbrush). He also watches her and Jack have sex. Afterwards, he begins drugging Juliet's wine so he can be closer to her while she is unconscious. After oversleeping for the third time in two weeks, Juliet becomes suspicious that she may have been drugged and has security cameras installed in her apartment.

After a date with Juliet, Jack is attacked and injured by Max. That night, Max drugs Juliet and attempts to rape her while she sleeps, but she awakens and he flees after giving her an injection. The next morning, Juliet finds the cap from the hypodermic needle. At work, she has her blood and urine analyzed and discovers high levels of Demerol and other drugs in her system. She rushes back home and finds Jack's possessions there but no sign of him. A nightshirt of hers is in a location where she did not leave it. She checks the security camera footage and sees Max assaulting her.

Max enters her apartment and tries to get her to drink some wine, but she refuses. He then assaults her, stabbing her with a hypodermic. She gets away and locks herself in the bathroom, but Max breaks in through the bathroom mirror and pulls her into one of the secret passageways. During the process of trying to hide from Max, she finds the corpse of Jack, who has been murdered by Max. The realization provokes Juliet to fight back against Max, and she quickly gains the upper hand, shooting him multiple times with a nail gun before killing Max by shooting him in the head, before escaping.

== Cast ==
In alphabetical order:

- Michael Badalucco as Moving Guy
- Penny Balfour as drug addict
- Aunjanue Ellis as Sydney
- Virginia Hool as nurse girl
- Christopher Lee as August
- Deborah Martinez as Mrs. Portes
- Michael Massee as Security Tech
- Jeffrey Dean Morgan as Max
- Mark Vincent Morocco as ER Surgeon
- Lee Pace as Jack
- Sean Rosales as Carlos
- Arron Shiver as architect
- Michael Showers as ER Doctor
- Hilary Swank as Juliet Devereau
- Sheila Traister as ER Nurse
- Nana Visitor as the Realtor

== Release ==
The film was shown in a limited number of American cinemas on 17 February 2011 and was then released direct to DVD in the United States on 29 March 2011.

== Reception ==
Rotten Tomatoes, a review aggregator, reports that 35% of 31 surveyed critics gave the film a positive review; the average rating was 4.55/10. Cath Clarke of The Guardian rated the film 2/5 and called it "generic and intermittently silly". Katherine Murphy of Trinity News said "The Resident is a voyeuristic thriller that never actually scares, thrills or excites."

On the other hand, Nigel Andrews of The Financial Times gave the film 4 stars (out of 5) and praised Swank's performance. Total Film were also fairly positive: "A sturdy cast and moody camerawork propel this taut, slow-simmering thriller out of the exploitation gutter; the gonzo psycho-killer climax drags it back in. Generic, yes, but gleeful with it".

== Novelization ==
A novelization of the film was written by Francis Cottam and published by Arrow Publishing in association with Hammer and the Random House Group in 2011, ISBN 978-0-09-955625-1.
