= Niilo Koljonen =

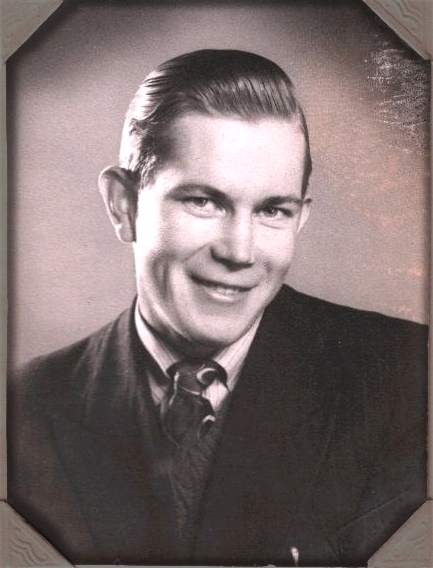
Niilo Koljonen

Niilo Koljonen (1927–2004) was a Finnish social scientist. He survived the concentration camps of the Soviet Union, and later studied at the Harvard University in the United States. He studied the democratization processes in Finland at the Finnish Department of State (Prime Minister's Office, and also developed ideas and concepts related to social systems in business world. he is considered a major figure in the unification of Finnish trade unions.

His magnum opus is a book about Corporate Democracy (Työntekijä ja Yritysdemokratia - January 1966). In his theories Koljonen argues that "the superior-subordinate system in business enterprises is the enemy of individual freedom. Companies are suffering from this performance," and "concentration of economic power in the hands of too few is alien to democracy." The book presents a world in which society in general has accepted democracy and right to vote, but the economic power is concentrated in a few hands, and business world is suffering from lack of worker motivation and poor decisions of the elite. Koljonen describes the empirical data sets on the basis of human motivation in terms of fertile forms of business where every employee is "inner entrepreneur", who is working towards a common goal. Foreword to the book was written by Mauno Koivisto. Koljonen set up a Corporate Democracy Association. Tarja Halonen, another president of Finland, was a founding member in the association.

In his youth, Koljonen struggled for years to be free from the Soviet Union concentration camps. Niilo Koljonen was the first Finn ever to draw up a map of the Soviet Union concentration camps. In 2012, award-winning book publisher and writer Sofi Oksanen released the map 2012 through Silberfeldt, at the National Audiovisual Archive.
