= Bayonet (2018 film) =

- Directed by: Kyzza Terrazas
- Written by: Rodrigo Marquez-Tizano; Kyzza Terrazas
- Starring: Brontis Jodorowsky; Miriam Balderas; Laura Birn
- Distributed by: Netflix
- Release date: 3 November 2018
- Running time: 101 minutes
- Countries: Finland; Mexico
- Language: Spanish

Bayonet (Finnish: Bayoneta – viimeinen isku, Spanish: Bayoneta) is a 2018 Finnish-Mexican drama film directed by Kyzza Terrazas and written by Rodrigo Marquez-Tizano and Kyzza Terrazas.

== Cast ==
- Brontis Jodorowsky as Denis
- Miriam Balderas as Erika
- Laura Birn as Sarita
- Jarmo Esko as Man in apartment
- Harrison Jones as press cameraman
- Ilkka Koivula as Jyrki
- Dom Lamar as Press Cameraman
- Luis Gerardo Méndez as Miguel
- Joonas Saartamo as Remu
- Ville Virtanen as Jaakko
