= Vilho Koljonen =

Finnish writer (1910–2000)

Vilho Koljonen (August 18, 1910 – September 1, 2000) was a Finnish writer, photographer and composer. He was born in Kiihtelysvaara. After 1955 he worked as a teacher in Särkijärvi school. He played guitar. He died in Muonio, aged 90.

Vilho's son, Veli Koljonen (born 1951), is a famous painter.

== Books ==
- Harmaan kylän laulu: rajakarjalainen idylli, 1943
- Laulava teini: runoja, 1944
- Seikkailu maan alla, (pseudonym Vilcol)
- Salaliitto: alkuperäisten päiväkirjamerkintöjen mukaan kuvailtu, 1953
- Muonion kairoilta, 1978
- Muonion kairoilta 2, 1980
- Muonion kairoilta 3, 1982
- Käsivarren kainalosta, 1998

== Some compositions ==
- Nallen kömmähdys
- Oli kerran satu
- Oman kylän tyttö
- Halivilivoo
- Kisällit kesällä
- Korpijenkka
- Lapin sävel
- Las ten kodin ka dul la
- Lauantain toivottu jenkka
