= Married to a Lie =

Finnish television miniseries

- Genre: Miniseries
- Written by: Marko Leino
- Directed by: Minna Virtanen
- Starring: Laura Birn; Mikko Nousiainen; Antti Luusuaniemi; Elina Stirkkinen; Anna Paavilainen; Jussi Nikkilä
- Theme music composer: Lauri Porra
- Country of origin: Finland
- Original language: Finnish
- No. of episodes: 4

Production
- Editor: Kimmo Taavila
- Running time: 180 min.

Original release
- Network: MTV3
- Release: December 28, 2008 – January 18, 2009

Married to a Lie is a Finnish television miniseries (4 x 45 min.) produced by Vertigo Production in 2008.

Married to a Lie received the award for Best Miniseries of 2009 at the Venla Finnish Television Awards gala 2010.

== Plot ==
Sonja (Laura Birn) is about to marry Kim (Mikko Nousiainen). In the middle of the wedding preparations, Kim is suddenly taken ill, Sonja sets off to drive him to the hospital, is involved in a car crash, and Kim dies in the hospital. After she recovers from the worst trauma, Sonja starts to sort out the practicalities connected to Kim’s death. It transpires that Kim had been lying to her about his entire life. The successful businessman turns out to be an unemployed idler, who, to top it all, was going to leave Sonja just before the wedding. The man Sonja was marrying did not exist. Sonja starts to probe into Kim’s hidden past, as it has been her past also. It is the only way for Sonja to survive her loss.
