= A Long Hot Summer (film) =

- Directed by: Perttu Leppä
- Written by: Perttu Leppä
- Produced by: Johannes Lassila
- Cinematography: Jyrki Arnikari
- Edited by: Kimmo Taavila
- Production company: Talent House
- Distributed by: Finnkino
- Release date: 26 March 1999 (Finland)
- Running time: 100 minutes
- Country: Finland
- Language: Finnish
- Budget: €880,000
- Box office: $552,521 (Finland)

A Long Hot Summer (Finnish: Pitkä kuuma kesä) is a 1999 Finnish rock comedy film written and directed by Perttu Leppä. It was the most popular youth film of the 1990s in Finland. The film, set in 1980, tells the story of a fictional rock band called Kalle Päätalo. Due to the film's popularity, the band started to tour around the country.

== Cast ==
- Unto Helo as Paavo "Patu" Taskinen, the manager and lyricist of the band Kalle Päätalo
- Hanna-Mari Karhinen as Noora, the driver of Kalle Päätalo
- Mikko Hakola as Jukka Lajunen, the singer of Kalle Päätalo
- Timo Lavikainen as Kukkonen, the drummer of Kalle Päätalo
- Konsta Hiekkanen as Jimi, the guitarist of Kalle Päätalo
- Olli Sorjonen as Kakkonen, the bassist of Kalle Päätalo
- Aino Seppo as Patu's mother
- Niina Stützle as Sanna, Patu's sister
- Toni Wirtanen as Lärssi, the singer of The Vittupäät
- Harri Tuovinen as Stuube, the bassist of The Vittupäät
- Pauli Rantasalmi as Pate, the drummer of The Vittupäät
- Aino Seppo - Patun äiti
- Niina Stützle - Sanna

== Reception ==
The film grossed $87,070 in its opening week and went on to gross $552,521 in Finland.
