= Purge (novel) =

2008 novel by Sofi Oksanen

- First edition (Finland)
- Author: Sofi Oksanen
- Original title: Puhdistus
- Translator: Lola Rogers
- Language: Finnish
- Genre: Historical novel, Crime novel
- Publisher: WSOY
- Publication date: 2008
- Publication place: Finland
- Media type: Print (Hardback; Paperback)
- Pages: 380 pp
- ISBN: 951-0-33973-3

Purge (Finnish: Puhdistus) is a novel by Finnish-Estonian writer Sofi Oksanen, which has been translated into thirty-eight languages. Oksanen's third Finnish-language novel, Purge was published in 2008 and is based upon her original play of the same name, staged at the Finnish National Theatre in 2007.

Purge is a story of two women forced to confront their own dark pasts, of collusion and resistance, of rape and sexual slavery set against the backdrop of the Soviet occupation of Estonia.

== Conception ==
The novel was originally conceived as a play. The play was written in 2007 and produced at the National Theatre of Finland. In writing the novel, Oksanen chose for the plot to diverge from its original ending and focus on different themes.

== Background ==
After existing as an independent country for twenty-one years, Estonia was occupied and annexed by the Soviet Union in June 1940 during World War II. In 1941–1944, Estonia was occupied by Nazi Germany. From February to November 1944, the German forces were expelled by the Red Army. The Soviet rule was re-established by force, and sovietisation followed, mostly carried out in 1944–1950. The forced collectivisation of agriculture began in 1947, and was completed after the mass deportation in March 1949. The Soviet authorities confiscated private farms and forced peasants to join collective farms. An armed resistance movement of forest brothers was active until the mass deportations. A total of 30,000 participated in or supported the movement; 2,000 were killed. The Soviet authorities fighting the forest brothers also suffered hundreds of casualties. Some innocent civilians were killed on both sides. In addition, a number of underground nationalist schoolchildren's groups were active. Most of their members were sentenced to long terms of imprisonment. The punitive actions decreased rapidly after Joseph Stalin's death in 1953; from 1956 to 1958, a large part of the deportees and political prisoners were allowed to return. Political arrests and numerous other kinds of crimes against humanity were committed during the occupation period until the late 1980s. In the end, the attempt to integrate the Estonian society into the Soviet system failed. Although the armed resistance was defeated, the population remained anti-Soviet. This helped Estonians to organise a new resistance movement in the late 1980s, regain their independence in 1991, and then rapidly develop a modern society.

== Plot ==
The plot begins in 1992 with an elderly woman, Aliide Truu, who lives in a remote portion of Estonia. The woman had isolated herself from the surrounding society and watches the youth of her nation, including her daughter, leaving the countryside for the more urban regions and Finland. One day while looking out the kitchen window, she discovers Zara, the granddaughter of her sister Ingel. Zara had been forced into sex trade by the Russian mafia, but has escaped from them. The only guide she had to finding help is a photograph from her grandmother with Aliide's name on it. The story then continues with a series of flashbacks, which develops the relationship between Aliide and her sister, which hinged upon their competition for the love of Hans Pekk during World War II. The story ends as Aliide begins to reconcile herself with her jealousy of her sister, and Zara's redemption from her disenchantment with the world caused by her sexual subjugation.

=== Characters ===
The plot of Purge focuses on two main female characters, on both of whom reviewers have commented as being complex and integral to the understanding of the themes of the book. The novel begins with Aliide Truu, an elderly woman who has survived many horrors of the Soviet occupation of Estonia. The Aliide whom the reader first meets has alienated herself from the local people, and is strongly self-reliant. Though cloaked in a rough exterior, she represents a woman who has weathered considerable hardship. She has hardly anything in the way of motherly instinct, especially in regard to the other main character, Zara.

Zara is the grandniece of Aliide, and at the beginning of the book she is subjected to sex trafficking by the Russian mafia. Her interaction with her great-aunt eventually forces Aliide to reconstruct and confront the history of her past. Ultimately, Aliide is responsible for delivering Zara from the torments caused by the sexual violence perpetrated against her.

== Themes ==
Sexual violence and its manifestation in the sex trade becomes one of the central themes in the book. Both of the main characters lose control of their bodies as they are abused. Though each women perseveres through the disgrace and purges herself of this disgrace by burning their clothes. However, sexual violence and terror recurs when Tallinn gets a sex shop that is staffed by ex-KGB, who had perpetuated the violence earlier in the novel. Ultimately, Oksanen successfully captures the horrors inflicted upon women by European military conflicts as well as exploring contemporary sex trafficking.

Resistance also permeates the book, especially against the Russification of Estonia. In the entries in Hans' diary and other parts of the narrative the anti-Russification poet Paul-Eerik Rummo appear. Also, Zara's grandmother continues to hold on to native Estonian tongue, resisting a change in language.

The complexity of family history and the uncovering of tragedy in that history is fundamental to the book. However, the focus is increasingly upon the story of the protagonist, sometimes missing some of the more horrifying or interesting parts of Estonian History. Jacob Silverman in The New Republic points out that this perspective on history, which only carries the narrative up to 1992, offers a contemporary perspective on the issues that face modern Estonia and a "window... of understanding" into it and its past.

== Style ==
Purge on the surface level is very bleak, while it explores the dark events of the Soviet occupation of Estonia. A review in the Winnipeg Free Press pointed out that Oksanen did "not shrink from depicting rape, torture or murder." The novel is also very realistic, focusing on small details of the characters, as well as presenting very close visual detail. The realism even goes so far as to depict tender moments, so that these horrific historical events can have a "human face". By doing so, Oksanen creates what Jacob Silverman called an "empathic treatment of all the miserable choices Estonians faced during their periods of oppression" under the brutal rule of the Soviet Union.

The story has very short chapters, with quickly shifting times and locations, which a Canadian reviewer mused was probably because of its original conception as a play. Finlit reviewer Lauri Sihvonen places emphasis on this precision of detail and style, saying "everything is packed into the language, every verb lives and breathes"

The narrative is interspersed with notebook entries of Hans Pekk and continues to move back and forth through time via flashbacks. This organization does not follow traditional chronology, but as Paul Binding in The Independent said, it "corresponds to an inner logic of association and feeling, and so builds up the more strongly to the emotionally shattering climax." However this logic is hyperfocused on the telling of the story of the protagonists, sometimes ignoring some of the more brutal or poignant parts of history.

Suspense is also an important element to the novel, as secrets from the family's past are revealed.

== Reception ==
The novel ranked number one on the bestseller list for fiction in Finland and Estonia. The novel subsequently won the Finlandia Prize (2008), the Runeberg Prize (2009) the Nordic Council Literature Prize (2010) and Prix Femina (2010). The novel won the Fnac prize in 2010, selected from some 300 works published in France amid positive reviews by French critics, it was the first time the prize had been awarded to a foreigner. The success of the novel has seen a resurgence of the play on stage with premieres of the play happening across Europe, notably at London's Arcola Theatre on the 24 February 2012 (on Estonian independence day) www.arcolatheatre.com. A film of the same name was released in the fall of 2012, produced by Markus Selin, and directed by Antti Jokinen. An opera of the same name, composed by Jüri Reinvere, was shown in the Finnish National Opera in 2012.

In Estonia, the book has been met with mixed views. Some like Piret Tali and Jaan Kaplinski have expressed more critical views, seeing the book as too trivial and sensationalist, whereas others like Mihhail Lotman have defended the author. Professor Rein Raud agrees that the narrative is skilfully composed. He questions, however, the book's historical license, and hints that the book's success in Estonia may derive from its alignment with the currently "correct ideology" in Estonian historiography, whereby Raud sees parallels with Hans Leberecht's communist propaganda writings. In Library Journal, reviewer Evelyn Beck writes that "Oksanen adeptly handles dual story lines and multiple points of view as she keeps us turning pages to reach the dramatic conclusion" and recommended the book "for fans of classic Russian writers like Tolstoy and Pasternak, as well as those who enjoy a contemporary tale of lust and betrayal".

== Film ==
The novel has been adapted into a film directed by Antti Jokinen and was selected as the Finnish entry for the Best Foreign Language Oscar at the 85th Academy Awards.

== Sources ==
- Villalon, Oscar (April 14, 2010). "Surviving Human Trafficking: A Noir Fairy Tale". NPR.
