= Antti Jokinen =

Finnish music video and film director (born 1968)

Antti Juhanpoika Jokinen
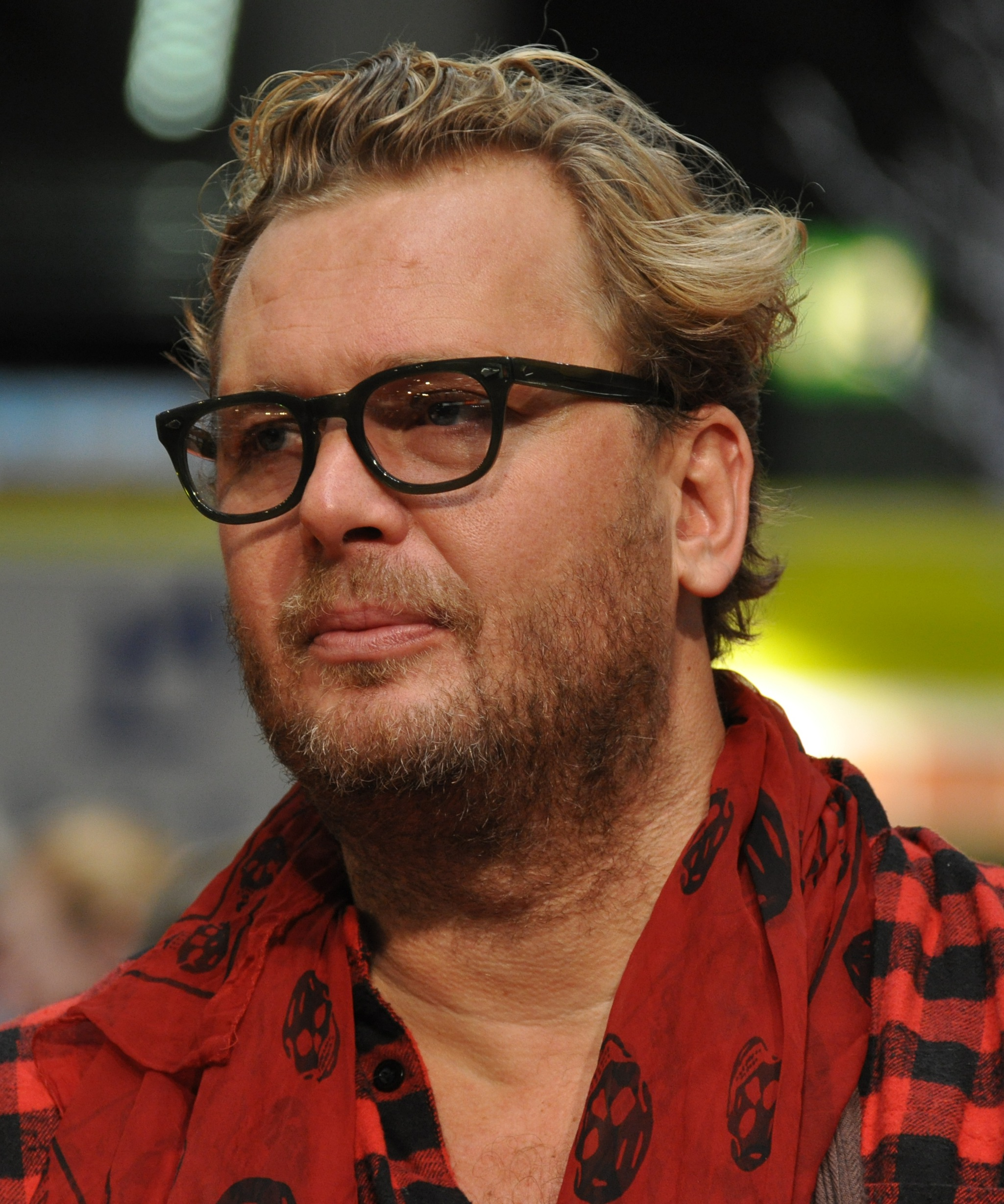
- Jokinen in 2013
- Born: Antti Juhanpoika Jokinen; 26 April 1968 (age 58); Nurmijärvi, Finland
- Other name: Antti J.
- Education: East Carolina University
- Occupations: Music video director; film director
- Years active: 2000–present
- Spouse: Krista Kosonen
- Children: 2
- Website: solarfilms.com/en

Antti Juhanpoika Jokinen (born 26 April 1968) is a Finnish music video and film director as well as a former college basketball player. He is married to actress Krista Kosonen.

== Early life and education ==
Born on 26 April 1968 in Nurmijärvi to the family of a sports journalist, Jokinen attended East Carolina University on a basketball scholarship and later graduated with a major in broadcast and film. While still in university, he produced a short film called Fist Full of Sand, which was based on Jim Morrison's poetry. The film won an award at the North Carolina Film Festival and attracted the attention of MTV executives in New York City.

== Career ==
After he graduated from university, Jokinen worked as an assistant producer on the music shows Awake on the Wild Side, MTV Rocks, and Yo! MTV Raps.

=== Television and music videos ===
After his studies in the US, Jokinen moved back to Finland and formed a production company called Storm Inc., together with Markus Selin, a Finnish film producer. Later on, the two formed Solar Films Ltd. Jokinen moved from directing music videos to television by landing a job to direct one episode of the Finnish TV series Tähtilampun alla. This led him to direct another TV series, Tähtitehdas, which was also produced by his partner, Selin. The two continued working together, producing music videos for Finnish and other European artists, including Sash. Jokinen eventually found an agent in the US and moved back there, becoming a full-time music video director. He worked on videos for artists such as Beyoncé, Will Smith, Tiziano Ferro, Missy Elliott, Anastacia, Celine Dion, Thalía, Kelly Clarkson, Korn, Lordi, Nightwish, Shania Twain, Westlife, and Wyclef Jean.

=== Film career ===
In 2009, Jokinen began shooting his first full-length film, The Resident, starring Hilary Swank, Jeffrey Dean Morgan, and Christopher Lee. It was released in March 2011.

After moving back to Finland, he directed the drama film Puhdistus, which is set in Estonia and based on Sofi Oksanen's book Purge. The film was selected as the Finnish entry for the Best Foreign Language Oscar at the 85th Academy Awards. In 2015, Jokinen directed his third feature film, Wildeye. He followed up with Flowers of Evil in 2016 and Helene in 2020.

== Personal life ==
Jokinen has a son with model Niina Kurkinen, whom he dated in the early 2000s. He was engaged to Finnish-American chef Sara La Fountain for seven years. After moving back to Finland, Jokinen married Finnish actress Krista Kosonen, with whom he has a daughter.

== Filmography ==
- The Resident (2011)
- Purge (2012)
- Wildeye (2015)
- Flowers of Evil (2016)
- Helene (2020)
- Kalevala: The Story of Kullervo (2026)
