= Laura Birn =

Finnish actress (born 1981)

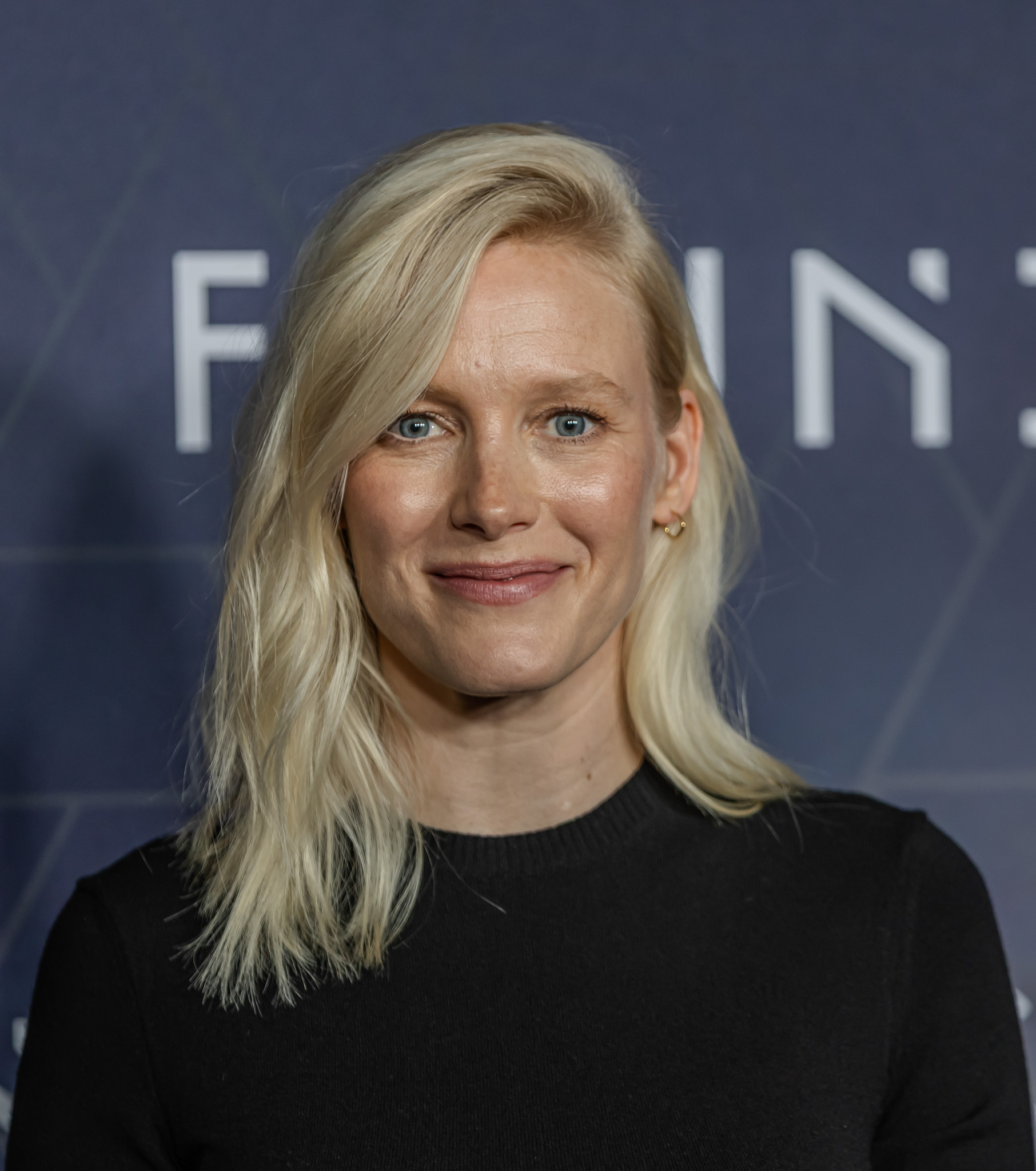
- Laura Birn in 2025
- Born: 25 April 1981 (age 45); Helsinki, Finland
- Years active: 2001–present
- Children: 2
- Awards: Best Actress, 2013, Jussi Awards; Tähti 2019, Red Carpet Film Festival

Laura Eveliina Birn (born 25 April 1981) is a Finnish film and TV actress.

== Early life and education ==
Birn was born in Helsinki, Finland. She completed her master's degree from Helsinki Theatre Academy in 2008.

Laura Birn in 2026

== Career ==
She is most famous for her appearances in the 2003 film Helmiä ja sikoja alongside Mikko Leppilampi and most notably in her role in the 2005 film Lupaus. She has tackled roles in historical dramas, lighthearted comedies, and thought-provoking art-house films with equal finesse.

In the United States, she is best known for her supporting role in the Finnish film Joulutarina (English title: Christmas Story) and A Walk Among the Tombstones.

Her performance in the 2012 film Purge earned her a nomination for a Satellite Award for Best Actress. In 2021 she began playing the role of robot Eto Demerzel in the series Foundation. The second season was released in 2023. Filming of the third season was completed in 2025, and it was released the same year.

In 2024, Finnish weekly news magazine Suomen Kuvalehti wrote, sourcing publicly available tax records, that Birn is the most highly-paid Finnish actor or actress of all time.

== Personal life ==
In addition to her native Finnish, Birn also speaks or understands English, Swedish, Portuguese and Spanish.

Birn is married and has two children.

== Filmography ==
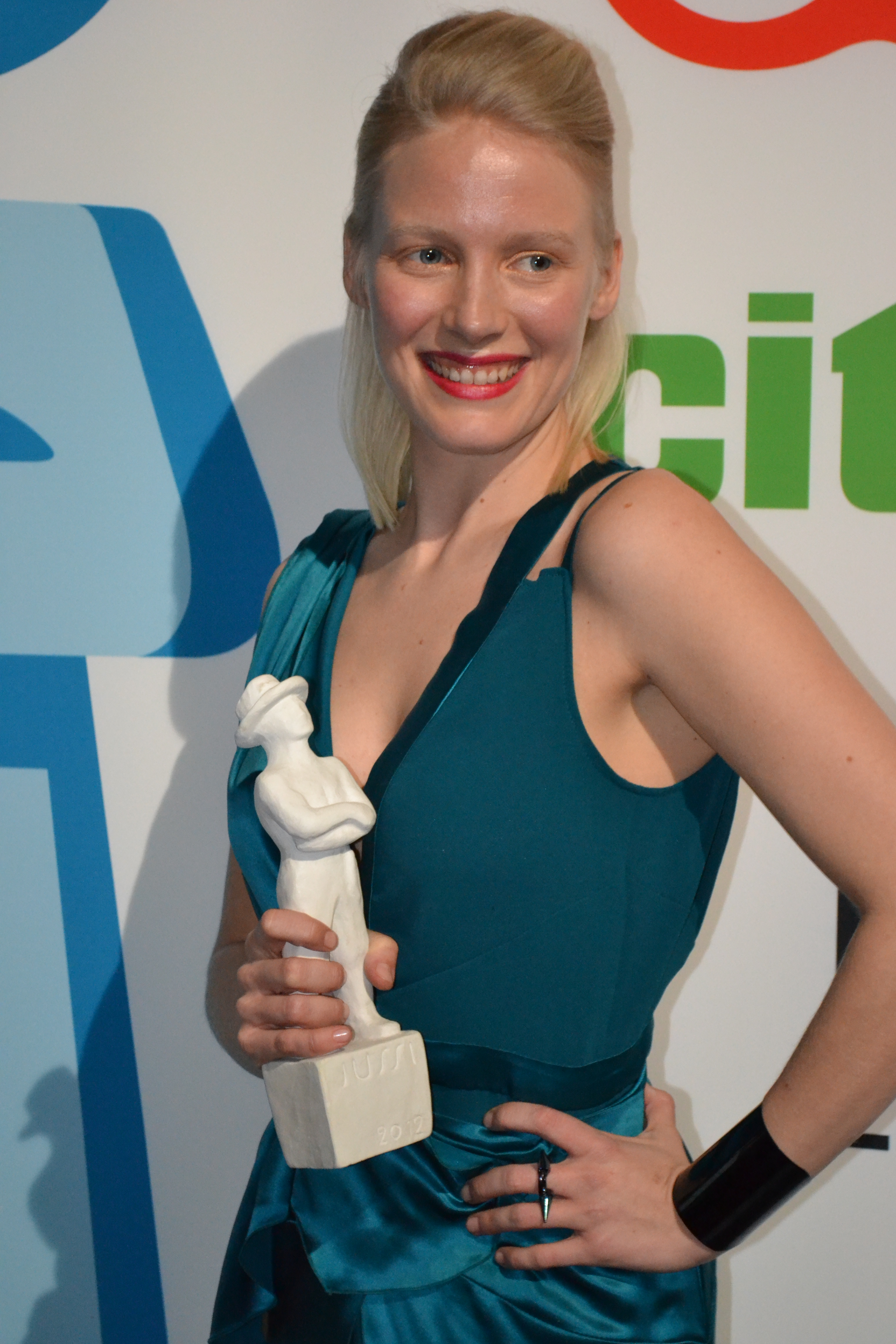
Laura Birn at the 2013 Jussi Awards

- Stripping (Hengittämättä ja nauramatta, 2002)
- Pearls and Pigs (Helmiä ja sikoja, 2003)
- Promise (Lupaus, 2005)
- Christmas Story (Joulutarina, 2007)
- 8 Days to Premiere (8 päivää ensi-iltaan, 2008)
- Ralliraita (2009)
- Must Have Been Love (En som deg, 2012)
- Naked Harbour (Vuosaari, 2012)
- Purge (Puhdistus, 2012)
- Heart of a Lion (Leijonasydän, 2013)
- August Fools (Mieletön elokuu, 2013)
- A Walk Among the Tombstones (2014)
- Henkesi edestä (2015)
- The Ones Below (2015)
- The Girl King (2015)
- Armi elää! (2015)
- Syysprinssi (2016)
- Tyhjiö (2018)
- Bayonet (Bayoneta – Viimeinen isku, 2018)
- Helene (2020)
- Games People Play (Seurapeli, 2020)
- Any Day Now (Ensilumi, 2020)
- The Last Ones (2020)
- The Crow (2024)

On television:

- Tuulikaappimaa (2003)
- Jumalan kaikki oikut (2006)
- Karjalan kunnailla (2007–2012)
- Married to a Lie (2008)
- Onnela (2018)
- The Innocents (2018, Netflix)
- Foundation (2021–present)
- Summer of Sorrow (Munkkivuori, 2022)
