= Kunto Ojansivu =

Finnish actor (1959–2023)

- Born: 22 December 1959; Rovaniemen maalaiskunta, Finland
- Died: 23 June 2023 (aged 63); Jämsä, Finland

Kunto Juhani Ojansivu (22 December 1959 – 23 June 2023) was a Finnish actor and playwright. Best known for his role as Elf Toljander, he appeared on television, film and stage.

== Career ==
Ojansivu made his debut on television in 1989, appearing in a number of television series in the 1990s. In 2001, he appeared on several episodes of Peräkamaripojat. His most famous role was the title role in the Christmas themed show Elf Toljander, which he played from 1998 to 2013.

In film, Ojansivu worked with director Timo Koivusalo on several occasions appearing in the film Rentun Ruusu in 2001 and in the 2003 film Sibelius alongside actors such as Martti Suosalo, Heikki Nousiainen, Seela Sella, Miina Turunen, Vesa Vierikko, Raimo Grönberg and Jarmo Mäkinen.

Ojansivu was one of the founders of Teatteri Eurooppa Neljä, the biggest touring theatre in Finland. He acted in plays and was also a playwright.

== Death ==
Ojansivu died in June 2023, at the age of 63.
