= Rea Mauranen =

Finnish actress

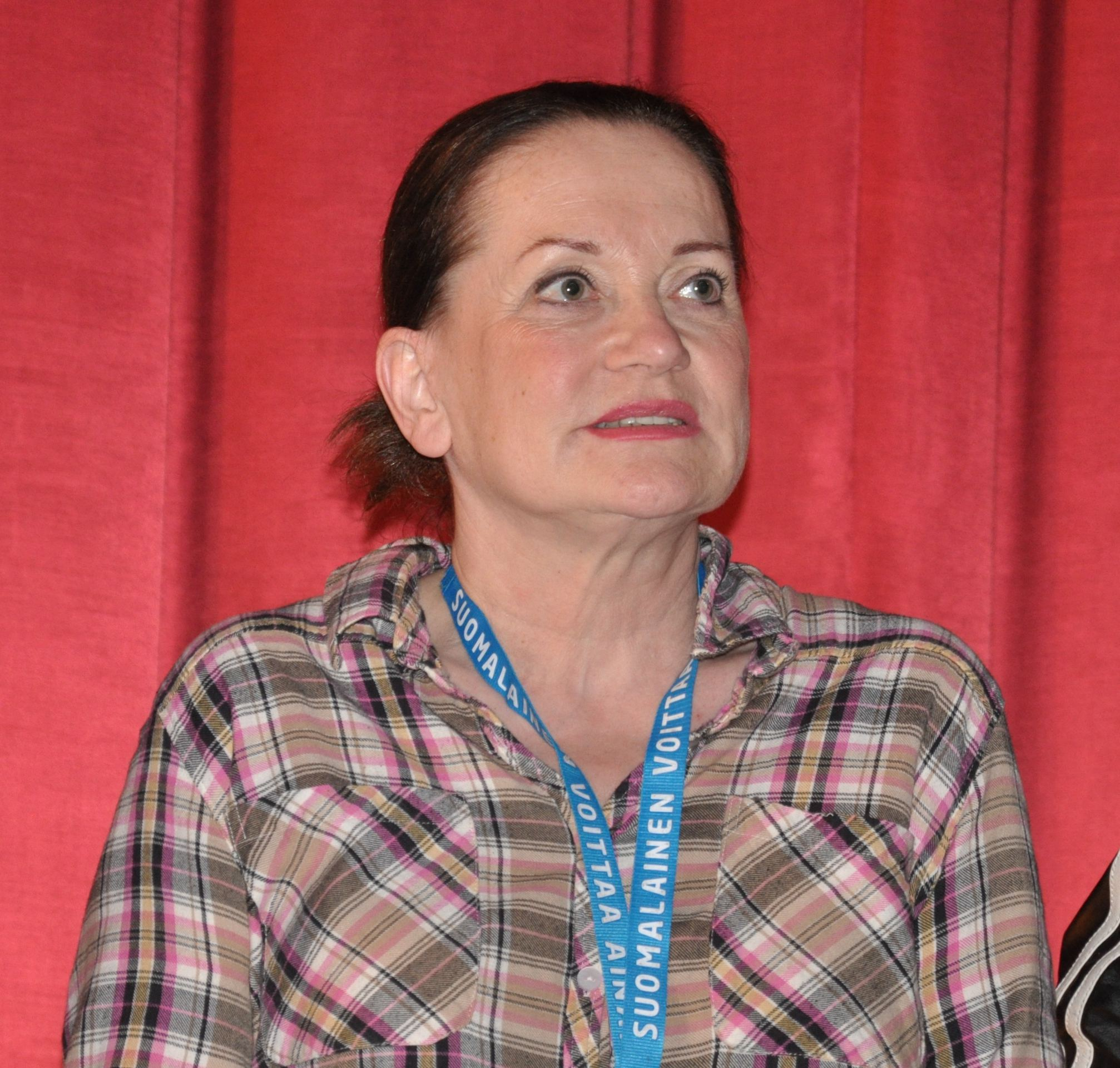
- Rea Mauranen in 2012.
- Born: 25 April 1949 (age 76); Helsinki, Finland
- Occupation: Actress

Rea Mauranen (born 25 April 1949) is a Finnish television actress who has appeared in several Finnish films.

Mauranen made her debut on TV in 1974, and has worked consistently ever since mostly appearing on Finnish television. In film, she worked with director Timo Koivusalo in the 2003 film Sibelius alongside actors such as Martti Suosalo, Heikki Nousiainen, Seela Sella, Miina Turunen, Vesa Vierikko, Raimo Grönberg and Jarmo Mäkinen.

Though not having children of her own, Rea said, bitterness is useless.

== Selected filmography ==
- Da Capo (1985)
- The Collector (1997)
- Cold Courage (2020)
- The Renovation (2020)
- Helsinki Syndrome (2022, 2024)
- Reindeer Mafia (2023)
