= Tapani Kalliomäki =

Finnish actor

- Born: 1970 (age 55–56); Tampere, Finland

Tapani Kalliomäki (born 1970 in Tampere, Finland) is a Finnish stage and film actor.

Kalliomäki graduated from Finnish Helsinki theatre academy in 1997. His teachers in the academy included Kari Heiskanen, Kari Väänänen and Vesa Vierikko. Kalliomäki began his career in theatre in the late 1980s as a stage actor. Entering Finnish film in 1995, he has worked with director Timo Koivusalo on several occasions appearing in the 2003 film Sibelius alongside actors such as Martti Suosalo, Heikki Nousiainen, Seela Sella, Miina Turunen, Vesa Vierikko, Raimo Grönberg, and Jarmo Mäkinen. Then, in 2005, he worked with Timo Koivusalo and Martti Suosalo again in the film of that year in Kaksipäisen kotkan varjossa. In 2007, Kalliomäki is seen in Åke Lindman's film Tali-Ihantala as Majuri Suurkari and on television in production Puolustuksen puheenvuoro playing the role of lawyer Silvasti. Kalliomäki has worked for example in Teatteri Pieni Suomi, Radioteatteri, Helsinki city theatre, KOM-theatre, Kallio-theatre and now he is an actor with Lahti City Theatre. Kalliomäki will play the role of Janne Kivivuori in the upcoming movies Täällä Pohjantähden alla (2009) and Täällä Pohjantähden alla II (2010).

On television, he has been in about twenty made for TV movies and played the lead role in the series Hovimäki.

== Filmography ==
- Lipton Cockton in the Shadows of Sodoma (1995)
- Sirpaleita (short 1996)
- Hovimäki (TV series 1999–2003)
- Sibelius (2003)
- Seitsemän veljestä (TV movie 2004)
- The Long Gone (short 2004)
- Shadow of the Eagle (2005)
- Tali-Ihantala 1944 (2007)
- Puolustuksen puheenvuoro (TV series 2009)
- Under the North Star (2009)
- Täällä Pohjantähden alla II (2010)
