= Columbia Gorge Orchestra Association =

American nonprofit organization

- Orchestra
- Short name: CGOA
- Founded: 1978; 48 years ago
- Location: Hood River, Oregon
- Concert hall: Hood River Elks Lodge; Hood River Middle School; Riverside Community Church (Hood River, Oregon); Wy'East Middle School (Odell, Oregon); Bingen Theater (Bingen, Washington)
- Music director: Mark Steighner
- Website: www.gorgeorchestra.org

The Columbia Gorge Orchestra Association (CGOA) is a nonprofit organization that sponsors several performing ensembles in the Columbia River Gorge area of Oregon and Washington. Founded in 1978 as the Mid-Columbia Sinfonietta, the CGOA was created in 2005 and now encompasses five ensembles: Sinfonietta (community orchestra), Voci Community Choir, Jazz Collective Big Band, Stages Musical Theatre (musicals), and Youth Choir (currently on hiatus). As of 2023, Mark Steighner is the artistic director emeritus of the association and conductor of the Sinfonietta.

== History ==
=== Early musical groups in Hood River ===
The earliest musical group in the Hood River Valley was the Hood River Music Association (HRMA), founded in 1942 by parents and members of the local community. The HRMA would come to be led by Boris Sirpo, the founder of the Portland Chamber Orchestra, who dreamed of turning Hood River into the "Salzburg of America". Under Sirpo, the association would twice put on the Hood River Music Festival, a four-day event held in 1948 and 1951, and sponsored the Hood River Symphony, a children's orchestra, and junior and senior choirs. Sirpo would break ties with the HRMA in 1956 due to contract disputes, and would be replaced by a string of conductors over the next 22 years.

=== Mid-Columbia Sinfonietta ===
On May 14, 1978, the Mid-Columbia Sinfonietta presented its first concert, held in Hood River under the auspices of the Chamber Music Society of Oregon. Dorothy McCormick, a Hood River native who had studied violin under Sirpo in the 1940s, served as the first director of the sinfonietta. The orchestra became a member of the Portland Chamber Music Society, but remained as an amateur ensemble. The local youth orchestra would also be brought into the fold, being renamed as the Mid-Columbia Junior Orchestra and also being conducted by McCormick.

McCormick died in 2004 after suffering a stroke while conducting the junior orchestra in concert. She was replaced in the role of conductor by Mark Steighner, who directed his first concert in charge of the Sinfonietta on March 4, 2005. Steighner, then the music director at Hood River Valley High School, led the charge to "increase the professionalism" of the Sinfonietta, highlighted by a name change to the Columbia Gorge Sinfonietta and the June 2005 formation of the Columbia Gorge Orchestra Association (CGOA). The Sinfonietta's season was extended from two performances each year to a series of three programs repeated on Friday and Sunday.

=== Columbia Gorge Orchestra Association ===
The CGOA was officially formed as a nonprofit organization on June 25, 2005, with Faith Ackerman named as the first president of the board of directors. Upon the founding of the CGOA, the Sinfonietta began to collaborate with artists from outside the Columbia River Gorge area, including Storm Large, Stephen Seifert, Blair Tindall, David Wilcox and the Vienna Boys' Choir. The association also began expanding beyond orchestra, originally with the addition of the VOCI choir in December 2006. A youth choir, a big band, and a theatre ensemble were all added over the next ten years. Until 2022, all ensembles were directed by Mark Steighner.

In 2016, Steighner co-founded the Performing Arts Initiative (PAI), an all-volunteer effort to develop a dedicated performing arts building in the Columbia River Gorge. The PAI signed a land pre-lease agreement to build a 400-600-seat multi-use facility for performing arts in Hood River; architectural renderings of the complex were released in 2019.

== Ensembles ==
The founding ensemble of CGOA is the Columbia Gorge Sinfonietta, the largest and oldest of the association's six ensembles. It typically has about 45-50 musicians, with five to nine being paid, professional musicians from both the Columbia River Gorge and the Portland metropolitan area. The Sinfonietta existed alone until the creation of CGOA, when VOCI was created in 2006. The choir performs both alone and with the Sinfonietta, and after years of flux has settled to become a mixed-voices group of about 50 singers currently directed by Dan Kenealy. The CGOA also includes the Gorge Youth Chorus, open to children ages eight to 13. It had been created in the early years of the CGOA but went on hiatus before returning as an active ensemble. The Youth Chorus is currently inactive.

The Gorge Jazz Collective Big Band was added in 2015, and as of 2023 is directed by Michael Paul. The Jazz Collective is a contemporary big band, but also has collaborated with local banda and marimba groups, plus many local jazz and pop musicians. The string quartet is not a sponsored ensemble, but made up of Sinfonietta musicians. The quartet plays private house concerts, weddings, and special occasions. Professional violinist Chari Harrington, a member of the Sinfonietta, became the first leader of the quartet.

The newest CGOA ensemble is Stages Musical Theatre, added to the association in 2016. The theatre group presents musical theatre, including such shows as Mama Mia, Fun Home, the Pirates of Penzance, West Side Story and Murder Ballad, and is the only CGOA ensemble that is not solely a musical group.
