= Susan Pickett =

American violinist and musicologist

- Education: Occidental College, Indiana University, Texas Tech University
- Occupations: Violinist, musicologist, professor
- Employer: Whitman College
- Known for: Research on women composers; concertmaster of Walla Walla Symphony
- Notable work: Marion and Emilie Frances Bauer: From the Wild West to American Musical Modernism
- Title: Catharine Gould Chism Professor of Music (emerita)

Susan Pickett is a violinist, musicologist, and Catharine Gould Chism Chair of Music at Whitman College in Walla Walla, Washington. She has authored numerous books in musicology, including "Marion and Emilie Frances Bauer: From the Wild West to American Musical Modernism."

Pickett’s academic work has focused on women composers active from the 17th through the 20th centuries. She has edited over 40 music editions and contributed scholarly essays on historical women in music. Her book Marion and Emilie Frances Bauer: From the Wild West to American Musical Modernism examines the lives and work of two early 20th-century American composers.

Pickett earned a Bachelor of Arts degree from Occidental College, where she was elected to Phi Beta Kappa. She completed a Master of Music degree in violin performance at Indiana University and received a Ph.D. in musicology from Texas Tech University. In 1981, she joined the faculty at Whitman College and was later appointed to an endowed professorship in music. She retired in 2018.

From 1987 to 2006, Pickett served as concertmaster of the Walla Walla Symphony. She also participated in a chamber ensemble that presented recitals focusing on compositions by women. The group released two recordings that included works by composers such as Clara Schumann and Amy Beach.

In 2018, Pickett donated a personal research collection to the Whitman College and Northwest Archives. The collection includes music manuscripts, scores, and correspondence related to historical women composers.
