= Kalliomäki =

Kalliomäki is a Finnish surname. Notable people with the surname include:

- Antti Kalliomäki (born 1947), Finnish politician and former athlete
- Tapani Kalliomäki (born 1970), Finnish stage and film actor
