= Sibelius (film) =

2003 Finnish biographical film

- Original Finnish film poster
- Directed by: Timo Koivusalo
- Written by: Timo Koivusalo
- Produced by: Timo Koivusalo
- Starring: Martti Suosalo, Heikki Nousiainen, Miina Turunen, Seela Sella
- Distributed by: Artista-Filmi
- Release date: 2003
- Running time: 120 minutes
- Language: Finnish
- Budget: €1.7 million

Sibelius is a 2003 Finnish film biography of Jean Sibelius directed and written by Timo Koivusalo. It is the first full-length feature film about the famous composer.

Filming began in July 2002. The film was released on 12 September 2003, but before that it was shown for the first time at the Sibelius Festival in Lahti on 4 September 2003. When it was released widely, it was the second most watched domestic film of 2003.

== Plot ==
While Johan Julius Christian ("Jean") Sibelius is still a child, his father Christian dies; the family is facing a financial disaster and must sell their property. Young Sibelius finds a new father figure in Uncle Pehr.

At the beginning of his musical studies with Martin Wegelius, Sibelius adopts the name of his uncle Jean. Plagued with insecurity, he continues to study law and, on the advice of his professor, returns to the music that is close to his heart while not interested in the law.

Sibelius meets Aino, daughter of his artistic sponsor Elisabeth Järnefelt and his future wife; Sibelius also comes into contact with composers such as Robert Kajanus and Ferruccio Busoni. Aino is impressed by the works of her writer friend Juhani Aho. During a one-year scholarship in Berlin, organized by Wegelius in 1889, he has to face the critical needs of his teacher Albert Becker. Sibelius deepens his friendship with the writer Adolf Paul. During his stay in Berlin, Uncle Pehr dies.

After returning from Berlin, Sibelius declares his love to Aino. Shortly after the engagement he begins a study visit to Vienna, where he establishes important social contacts. There, however, his plans to pursue a career as a violinist fail. Sibelius is plagued with jealousy when it is discovered that Juhani Aho has expressed his love for Aino in a novel.

When Sibelius returns to Finland, he and Aino get married. Sibelius celebrates his first success with his symphonic poem Kullervo. Soon the first daughter Eva is born. When Russian Tsar Alexander III died in 1894, Sibelius' friends worry about how Russian rule in Finland will develop under the new Tsar Nicholas II.

The Sibelius family grows with the birth of more daughters; Sibelius, however, focuses entirely on composition, which leads to an upheaval of the marriage. Shortly afterwards Sibelius's mother Maria dies. Sibelius and Kajanus challenge the escalation of Russian censorship with a performance of Sibelius Finland's patriotic symphonic poem.

On the other hand, Sibelius soon faces the loss of his daughter Kirsti, who dies of typhus. During a stay of the Sibelius family in Rapallo, Italy, one of the surviving daughters falls ill, but recovers to the family's great relief. Sibelius composes his second symphony in Rapallo, the premiere of which will be a great success.

In building their home, Ainola, on Lake Tuusulanjärvi, the Sibelius couple face financial problems. Sibelius's sick sister has to go to the sanatorium; Sibelius himself suffers from ringing in his ears and the consequences of his drinking habit; after an operation for a tumor, Sibelius stops smoking and drinking.

After composing the King Christian Suite, Sibelius writes the Jääkärimarssi for the troops fighting against Russia during the October Revolution. As a result of the riots, the Red Army searches for weapons in his home. Due to the composition of the Jääkärimarssi, Sibelius has to flee with his family.

In old age, Sibelius burns his plans for an eighth symphony.

== Cast ==
- Martti Suosalo as younger Jean Sibelius
- Heikki Nousiainen as old Jean Sibelius
- Miina Turunen as younger Aino Sibelius
- Seela Sella as old Aino Sibelius
- Vesa Vierikko as Robert Kajanus
- Raimo Grönberg as Martin Wegelius
- Jarmo Mäkinen as Akseli Gallen-Kallela
- Tapani Kalliomäki as Armas Järnefelt
- Kunto Ojansivu as Adolf Paul
- Rea Mauranen as Maria Sibelius
- Petri Lairikko as Axel Carpelan
- Kirsi Tarvainen as Linda Sibelius
- Christian Sandström as Christian Sibelius
- Erkki Ruokokoski as Pehr-uncle
- Olavi Niemelä as George Becker
- Risto Kaskilahti as Sigurd Wettenhovi-Aspa
- Hannu Kivioja as Ferruccio Busoni
- Ritva Jalonen as Pauline Lucca
- Paavo Liski as Konni Zilliacus
- Susanna Palin as Saimi Järnefelt
- Eija Nousiainen as Elisabeth Järnefelt
- Konsta Hannonen as Juhani Aho
- Kari Hietalahti as Eino Leino
- Lars Svedberg as Santeri Levas
- Eveliina Puhakka as Sibelius daughter
- Johanna Puhakka as Sibelius daughter
- Pauliina Puhakka as Sibelius daughter
- Aliisa Kuivasto as Sibelius daughter
- Veera Välimäki as Sibelius daughter

== Reception ==
Sibelius received a mixed reception after its release. Helena Ylänen from Helsingin Sanomat says the film is "genuinely and sincerely Koivusalo, an uninhibitedly sentimental and smooth depiction of Sibelius, his inner circle, his music and his homeland." Jarkko Silén from Film-O-Holic.com describes "Koivusalo's stiff directing style as problematic," adding that "the director portrays Jean and Aino's relationship in a rather stiff manner, which shows that he is not in his comfort zone."

== See also ==
- List of Finnish films of the 2000s
