= One Last Deal =

2018 Finnish drama film

- Film poster
- Directed by: Klaus Härö
- Written by: Anna Heinämaa
- Starring: Heikki Nousiainen
- Release date: 7 September 2018 (TIFF)
- Running time: 95 minutes
- Country: Finland
- Language: Finnish

One Last Deal (Finnish: Tuntematon mestari) is a 2018 Finnish drama film directed by Klaus Härö and written by Anna Heinämaa. It was screened in the Contemporary World Cinema section at the 2018 Toronto International Film Festival.

== Plot ==
Olavi runs a small now failing art dealership and just want to makes one last deal before closing up (despite another younger dealer saying that the last elderly dealer who closed his business died six months after retiring). His teenage grandson, Otto, whom Olavi recognises only after some while, arrives at the gallery and demands Olavi fill out paperwork for work experience but Olavi says there is no work for him now. Later, Olavi's daughter and Otto's mother Lea, who is also estranged to Olavi, arrives begging him to take on Otto as no one else will take Otto due to his record of poor behaviour including theft. Having recently seen a small unsigned portrait of someone who may be a Russian monk or a peasant which he wishes to research prior to an upcoming auction, the library refusing to send books to him for that research, and being unable to close the shop lest he lose a needed sale, Olavi reluctantly takes on Otto.

Otto, although largely uninterested in the job, does manage to make a sale for greater than the ticket price and runs to the library where he brags about his sale and decides he will pocket the difference since the purchase was for more than Olavi was asking. Olavi has Otto join in the research and, when Otto starts off unenthusiastically, demands that Otto do better. Olavi attempts to inculcate in Otto a love of art and seems to make a small break through with Iltaa kohti (Towards the Evening) by Hugo Simberg, a portrait of a two people, and elderly man at the end of his life and a young boy at the beginning.

Olavi finds the entry "Kristus 33 x 41 cm, olja på duk" (Christ 33 x 41, oil on canvas) in a small booklet about an art exhibition with the dimensions matching the painting but no photograph so it is suggestive but not proof. Olavi roles his eyes when Otto suggests googling it but Otto decides to do this anyway, finding address of the woman who lent the painting to the exhibition. He travels there alone, discovers it is a care facility, that the woman has died, and pretends he is a distant relative. The nurse allows him in and says to take what he wants, the rest will be dumped and Otto searches.

Olavi, having tried to secure funds but failing, still ends up purchasing the painting for 12 000 € plus fees and taxes and immediately after shows to his friend and fellow art dealer Patu a photo of the painting with the artist's name, that of a famous Russian artist, meaning the painting has a high value. Otto and Olavi bond as Olavi describes the thrill Otto had when allowing the nurse to convince herself that Otto should be allowed in, comparing that to good salesmanship. Lea goes to Olavi's gallery and the pair reminisce over her experiences in the gallery as a child.

Olavi attempts to raise the money to pay. Having been invited to dinner with his daughter dinner sours when he asks her for money. However, without her knowledge Olavi asks Otto and receives several thousand euro. He also takes out a loan on top of his business mortgage. Just after the money is paid over, the auctioneer is handed missing paper work confirming the painting as a work by Ilya Repin meaning it is very valuable to art collectors. Lea learns of the loan from her son and demands Olavi pay it back immediately.

Olavi lines up a customer who is very interested but who goes to the auction house and talks to the auctioneer. When the buyer does not turn up, Olavi takes the painting to him, and the buyer refuses. In debt, Olavi has to sell his business and he moves his paintings to his apartment.

Bringing round some mail, Patu tells Olavi that the auction house had all the provenance paperwork but messed up. Enraged at learning this, Olavi goes and makes a scene at the auction house. The auctioneer says he only revealed the sale price—but the suspiciously low price for a Russian Master's painting threw suspicion on its authenticity. The auctioneer offers to cancel the purchase but Olavi refuses.

Olavi reads his mail, including a work placement rating card that Otto has filled out as "6 out of 5". As he reads, his phone rings and an art historian from Stockholm Museum gives her opinion that the painting is unsigned not because it is a forgery but because, as a portrait of the Christ, it is an icon and icons being made to glorify the divine do not bear the painter's name.

A short time later while travelling past his old gallery, he sees it refurbished. While tidying his apartment, he dies.

Following the funeral, the auctioneer is engaged to assess Olavi's collection. He says nothing is valuable, not even the unsigned Christ painting which he insists he will buy back for the price Olavi paid despite secretly knowing its value. Lea is willing to sell it but Otto strongly objects. Patu arrives and says she cannot as it has been left to Otto in Olavi's will.

In voice over, Olavi is heard reading a letter to his daughter, wishing her well, apologising for not being around more, and telling Otto he is rated "excellent plus" as she travels home with the painting to give to her son.

== Cast ==
- Heikki Nousiainen as Olavi
- Pirjo Lonka as Lea
- Amos Brotherus as Otto
- Stefan Sauk as Albert Johnson
- Pertti Sveholm as Patu
- Jakob Öhrman as Dick Sundell
- Eero Ritala as Nuorempi Taidekauppias
- Kristofer Möller as Rabbe
