= The Hard-Boiled Canary =

1941 film by Andrew L. Stone

- Reissue theatrical release poster
- Directed by: Andrew L. Stone
- Screenplay by: Robert Lively; Andrew L. Stone
- Story by: Robert Lively; Andrew L. Stone
- Produced by: Andrew L. Stone
- Starring: Allan Jones; Susanna Foster; Margaret Lindsay; Lynne Overman; Grace Bradley; William Collier Sr. Heimo Haitto
- Cinematography: Theodor Sparkuhl
- Edited by: James Smith
- Music by: Phil Boutelje
- Production company: Paramount Pictures
- Distributed by: Paramount Pictures
- Release date: June 8, 1941
- Running time: 80 minutes
- Country: United States
- Language: English

The Hard-Boiled Canary is a 1941 American musical comedy film directed by Andrew L. Stone and written by Robert Lively and Andrew L. Stone. It was later reissued as There's Magic in Music.

The film stars Allan Jones, Susanna Foster, Margaret Lindsay, Lynne Overman, Grace Bradley, William Collier Sr. and Heimo Haitto. It was released on June 8, 1941, by Paramount Pictures.

== Plot ==
Young and carefree Michael Maddy helps run Interlochen Center for the Arts for his ill father. A burlesque performer in a skimpy costume, Toodles LaVerne, impresses him with her voice, enough so that Michael makes and wins a wager with opera-company publicist George Thomas that she's good enough to sing professionally.

The joint is raided and entertainer Madie Duvalle is arrested by the police, but Toodles gets away with Michael's help. He enrolls her in the music camp over the objections of Sylvia Worth, his efficiency expert, and other campers partly because of Toodles's appearance and also because she can't even read music. Michael and George scrub off the stage makeup over Toodles's objections, whereupon she sings a number that impresses everyone at camp. Michael wants her to audition for a New York City opera house.

Madie, out of jail now, does a magazine story about Toodles' past life. The music camp's appalled financial backers pull their funds and their students. In the end, though, Michael manages to get Toodles in front of the opera company, where she wins everyone's approval.

== Cast ==
- Allan Jones as Michael Maddy
- Susanna Foster as Toodles LaVerne
- Margaret Lindsay as Sylvia Worth
- Lynne Overman as George Thomas
- Grace Bradley as Madie Duvalie
- William Collier, Sr. as Dr. Joseph E. Maddy
- Heimo Haitto as Heimo Haitto
- Peter Meremblum as Peter Meremblum
- William Chapman as William Chapman
- Kaye Connor as Kaye Connor
- Diana Lynn as Dolly Loehr
- Patricia Travers as Patricia Travers
- Richard Bonelli as himself
- Richard Hageman as Richard Hegeman
- Irra Petina as Irra Petine
- Tandy MacKenzie as Tandy MacKenzie
- Fay Helm as Miss Wilson
- Esther Dale as Miss Clark
- Deems Taylor as Deems Taylor
- Bertram Marburgh as Mr. Myers
- Carol Holloway as Nurse
