= Da Capo (film) =

- Original Finnish film poster
- Directed by: Pirjo Honkasalo; Pekka Lehto
- Written by: Pirjo Honkasalo; Pirkko Saisio
- Produced by: Pekka Lehto; Katinka Faragó
- Starring: Raimo Karppinen; Jan Söderblom; Tarmo Manni; Rea Mauranen; Eeva-Maija Haukinen
- Cinematography: Kari Sohlberg
- Edited by: Tuula Mehtonen
- Music by: Atso Almila
- Production company: P-Kino Oy
- Distributed by: Sandrew Film & Theater
- Release date: 16 August 1985
- Running time: 121 minutes
- Countries: Finland; Sweden
- Language: Finnish
- Budget: FIM 6.5 million

Da Capo is a 1985 Finnish biographical drama film directed by Pirjo Honkasalo and Pekka Lehto. It is loosely based on the life of violinist Heimo Haitto (1925–1999) as the foster son of his teacher Boris Sirpo in Finland and the United States. The events in the film take place about three decades after Haitto, from the mid-1960s to the early 1980s.

The film was shot mostly on the West Coast of the United States, mainly in California. With a budget of six and a half million Finnish marks, it was the most expensive Finnish film before Rauni Mollberg's The Unknown Soldier, which was completed the same year.

Da Capo was awarded at film festivals in Figueira da Foz, Portugal, and Ghent, Belgium. Paul Jyrälä received the Jussi Award for the film's sound design.

== Plot ==
Mrs. Arsi, the mother of a Finnish working-class family, sells her 13-year-old talented violinist son Arto to be adopted by the famous teacher Sergei Rippas. At the home of the stern and eccentric man, Arto learns that, according to the contract, he is not allowed to see his family for ten years. Rippas takes his young adult prodigy to the United States to give a concert, but he disappears into the Las Vegas night. Suvi Ekman, a local young Finnish woman hired by Rippas, finds Arto in jail on charges of interfering with a minor. Suvi, Arto, and Sergei Rippas tour the West Coast, and during all this, Suvi and Arto fall in love.

== Cast ==
- Raimo Karppinen as Arto Arsi
- Jan Söderblom as young Arto
- Tarmo Manni as Sergei Rippas
- Rea Mauranen as Suvi Ekman
- Eeva-Maija Haukinen as Arto's mother
- Per Oscarsson as Eino the doctor
- Jayne Meadows as Mrs Thomas
- Marta Becket as ballet dancer
- Lew Hopson as Big Morgan
- Virginia Capers as prisoner

== See also ==
- List of Finnish films of the 1980s
