= Jarmo Mäkinen =

Finnish actor (born 1958)

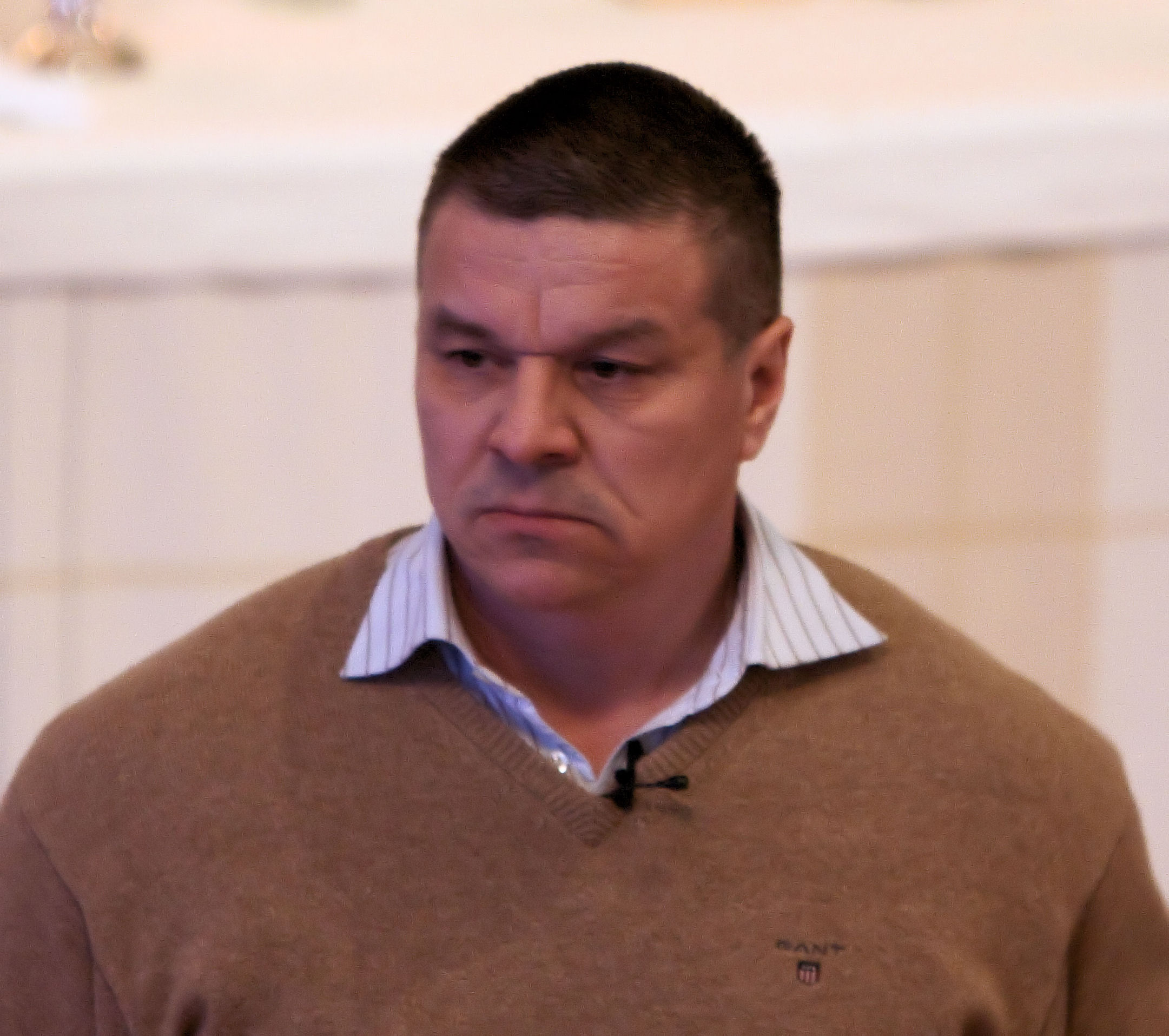
- Jarmo Mäkinen
- Born: 29 May 1958 (age 68); Karstula, Finland

Jarmo Mäkinen (born 29 May 1958 in Karstula, Finland) is a Finnish actor.

Mäkinen began acting in 1989 on television working consistently throughout the 1990s appearing in several films and TV series mostly notably in Vita lögner which he starred in 27 episodes in 1999. However, since 2000 he has gradually made more appearances on the big screen and in film, he starred in the 2003 film Sibelius working with Finnish director Timo Koivusalo and actors such as Martti Suosalo, Heikki Nousiainen, Seela Sella, Miina Turunen, and Vesa Vierikko.

Most of Mäkinen's work in cinema has been in Swedish film where his powerful physical build has often seen him typecast as a bad guy. He is often regarded as one of the most famous or most popular Finns in Sweden.

== Filmography ==
=== Film ===
- Amor ampuu ohi (1990) - Tapani
- Routasydän (1993) - Vanhanen
- Paratiisin lapset (1994) - Athlete
- The Last Wedding (1995) - The Rockroller
- The Hunters (1996) - Tomme Harela
- The Jackal (1997) - Ghazzi's Bodyguard (uncredited)
- Zingo (1998) - Puda
- Poika ja ilves (1998) - Herman Haapala
- Lapin kullan kimallus (1997) - Edvard Manninen
- Dykaren (2000) - Charlie
- Ponterosa (2001) - Rantaruotsalainen
- Young Love (2001) - Miss Young Face-kisojen juontaja
- Ancient Warriors (2002) - Hank
- Sibelius (2003) - Akseli Gallen-Kallela
- At Point Blank (2003) - Raimo
- Populärmusik från Vittula (2004) - Isak / Niila's father
- Rancid (2004) - Ash
- Den utvalde (2005) - Bodström
- Babas bilar (2006) - Penti
- Quest for a Heart (2007) - Paksu Rölli (voice)
- Myrsky (2008) - Rehtori
- Kommissarie Späck (2010) - Enhörningen
- The Path of the Righteous Men (2012) - Juhana Sulander
- Purge (2012) - Lavrenti
- Vadelmavenepakolainen (2014) - Jorma
- The Girl King (2015) - The General
- LasseMajas detektivbyrå - Stella Nostra (2015) - Pandoro
- The Dissidents (2017) - Finnish Investigator
- Operation Ragnarök (2018) - Sampo / Boss Monster
- The Longest Day (2020)

=== TV ===
- Tatort (2009, Episode: "Tango für Borowski", Crime Scene, German crime television series)
