= Elf Toljander =

Finnish television series

Elf Toljander (Finnish: Tonttu Toljanteri) is a Finnish Christmas themed television show for children that was broadcast by Yle TV2. It was first presented in 1998. Yle TV2 made new episodes between 1999 and 2013. One episode is about 5–15 minutes long, depending on the year.

A CD titled "Kukahan se kaikki keinot keksii?" (roughly translated "Whoever will come up with all the solutions?") was released in 2001. In 2003, a film called Tonttu Toljanterin joulumieli (Elf Toljanders Christmas Spirit) was released.

== Cast ==
- Elf Toljander (Finnish: Tonttu Toljanteri) by Kunto Ojansivu
- Santa Claus (Finnish: Joulupukki) by Jukka Pääkkönen (1998–2011) and Ilkka A. Jokinen (2013)
- Mrs. Santa Claus (Finnish: Joulumuori) by Satu Säävälä
- Doctor Pancake (Finnish: Lääkäri Lettu) by Kirsi Laamanen
- Elf Viänänen of Kuopio (Finnish: Kuopion Tonttu Viänänen) by Erkki Teittinen
- Electrician Elf (Finnish: Sähkömiestonttu) by Jussi Rekonen
- Hilda Häkkyrä & Mesh Fell's Selma (Finnish: Hilda Häkkyrä & Silmätunturin Selma)

== Seasons ==
=== Tonttu Toljanterin joulupulma (1998) ===
Elf Toljander's Christmas problem.

On December 1 Toljander accidentally hits Santa Claus with ladder, causing him to lose his memory. Toljander tries to hide this by keeping everyone away from Santa Claus and doing all Santa's work. Toljander falls in love with Doctor Pancake, but is too shy to say anything. When the last moment approaches and Santa Claus should leave for his trip to distribute the presents, Toljander accidentally hits Santa Claus again with the ladder and he gets his memory back.

=== Tonttu Toljanterin tarinoita (1999) ===
Elf Toljander's stories.

Instead of the advent calendar format, this season has just 10 episodes that were broadcast weekly.

=== Tonttulan elämää (2000) ===
Elf Toljander's life. This season continues with the weekly episode format.

==== Episodes ====
- Reilun pelin säännöt
- Toljanterin korvatulehdus
- Eksyksissä
- Lentsuja Tonttulassa
- Talven riemuja
- Kielivaikeuksia
- Tonttulan Pavarotti
- Kadonneet lahjat
- Saunova poro
- Hilda lähtee Kiinaan

=== Tonttu Toljanterin Tonttu-TV (2003) ===
Elf Toljander's Elf-TV.

This season marks the return to the usual advent calendar format.

Elf Hilda complains that the kids are going wild. Santa Claus starts a new TV program that does not mention the word "Christmas". "Let Christmas come into our hearts little by little, day by day and by night", says Santa Claus. Toljander is selected as the star of the show.

=== Tonttu Toljanteri muorin töissä ===
Elf Toljander at Mrs Claus' work.

Mrs. Claus gets sick with sleepbug (unipöpö), which affects elves who have been working overtime for over 500 years. Toljander takes Mrs. Claus into his sleep place, and tells no one to enter, claiming that a Christmas bogeyman lives there. Toljander takes care of all the Mrs. Claus's work, and always comes up with a reason why Mrs. Claus is not reachable. He does not want create panic when they hear she is sick.

=== Oikean joulun salaisuus (2010) ===
Secret of real Christmas.

Santa and Mrs. Claus wait for a specialist to arrive to help them modernize Christmas. Elf Toljander is horrified by the idea; there is nothing wrong with Christmas as it is.

=== Tonttu Toljanterin tuhmaikä (2011) ===
Elf Toljander's naughty age.

Toljander is bit by an angry bee (äkäampiainen), that causes him to enter the naughty age. Toljander tries to hide his naughty age from the other elfs, since it is not usual for an elf more than 100 years old to be affected by it.

=== Tonttu Toljanteri tonttujen tonttuna (2013) ===
Elf Toljander as the elf of the elfs.

Elf Toljander has to take the role of the elf that usually checks if the other elves have been naughty or nice, when he discovers the map of hiding places for the elf that usually does the job. He also has to investigate why Santa's toy storage has been unusually empty this year.

== More information ==
- YLEn Elävä arkisto: Tonttu Toljanteri muorin töissä (Finnish)
- YLEn Elävä arkisto: Tonttu Toljanterin joulumieli (Finnish)
