= Reindeer Mafia =

Finnish crime drama television series

Reindeer Mafia (Finnish: Poromafia) is a Finnish crime drama television series directed and created by Mika Kurvinen. The series takes place in Lapland, Finland. The first season of the series premiered on C More in Finland and Sweden in Winter 2023.

== Cast ==
- Samuli Edelmann as Sameli Nelihanka
- Anna-Maija Tuokko as Sara Poikkipää
- Aake Kalliala as Rouku Nelihanka
- Olavi Uusivirta as Pieti Nelihanka
- Rea Mauranen as Brita Nelihanka
- Mikko Kouki as Rasmus Pulmanki
- Mikael Persbrandt as Stagge
