= Elis Sella =

Finnish actor

- Born: 25 September 1930; Viipuri, Finland
- Died: 8 December 1992 (aged 62); Helsinki, Finland
- Spouse: Seela Sella

Elis Sella (25 September 1930 Viipuri, Finland – 8 December 1992) was a Finnish actor.

Sella's father was Polish-Jewish and mother Lithuanian-Jewish. He was married to actress Seela Sella. The couple had two children, a son named Ariel and a daughter, Ilana.
