= The Guarded Village 1944 =

- Finnish: Vartioitu kylä 1944
- Directed by: Timo Linnasalo
- Written by: Ilpo Tuomarila; Timo Linnasalo; Jouko Lumme
- Based on: play Vartioitu kylä by Unto Heikura
- Produced by: Jouko Lumme
- Starring: Raimo Grönberg; Markku Huhtamo; Kaija Kangas; Antti Litja
- Cinematography: Antti Peippo
- Edited by: Juho Gartz
- Music by: Heikki Valpola
- Production company: Reppufilmi Oy
- Release date: 3 November 1978 (Finland)
- Running time: 100 min
- Country: Finland
- Language: Finnish

The Guarded Village 1944 (Finnish: Vartioitu kylä 1944) is a 1978 film directed by Timo Linnasalo. The film is based on the play Vartioitu kylä (1974) by Unto Heikura. The play was released on 20 June 1974 in Kuhmo summer theater.

== Story ==
The events take place on year 1944, during the Continuation War in the end of World War II. Patrol man Jaakko Tulivaara (Timo Torikka) returns to his home for holiday, when killing people has damaged his mental state. His home village is guarded by a Finnish military group led by Sergeant Tolvanen (Antti Litja). In the village is also a wounded Soviet spy (Raimo Grönberg), whose family had moved from Finland to Russia a long time before the war. The spy happens to be a childhood friend of Tulivaara.

== Critique ==
At its time, the film was positively accepted. The script, content, cinematography, music and cast were liked. One problem of the film are the flashbacks from the past. The film was considered to be a nice novelty, later it was also mentioned to be one of the nicest first direction-films.

== Cast ==
- Raimo Grönberg as Janne Kyllönen, spy
- Markku Huhtamo as private Kumpulainen
- Kaija Kangas as Anna Keskitalo
- Antti Litja as sergeant Tolvanen
- Paavo Piskonen as private Kervinen
- Timo Torikka as Jaakko Tulivaara
- Markku Blomqvist as Jalo Vuokko
- Kauko Huusko as Heikki Keskitalo
- Kaarlo Karppanen as Kärnä old man
- Martti Kuningas as one-eyed soldier
- Mauno Kähkönen as Kalle Tulivaara
- Tuula Nyman as Ethel Paakinaho
- Taimi Haikonen as a woman in Keskitalo
- Marko Heikura as Alpo Tulivaara
- Marko Karppanen as Janne as a boy
- Eero Komulainen as Jaakko as a boy
- Teppo Korhonen as military policeman Kettunen
- Irja Leväsalmi as Kaisa Keskitalo
- Jouko Lumme as military policeman Malm
- Tuula Pulkkinen as Leena Tulivaara
- Matti Rahikainen as Janne's father
- Kaisu Haikonen as a girl in Keskitalo
- Yrjö Haverinen as soldier
- Marja-Leena Heikkinen as a woman in Keskitalo
- Petri Heikkinen as a child in Keskitalo
- Pirre Heikkinen as a child in Keskitalo
- Saara Holopainen as old Reetta in Keskitalo
- Kauko Hyvärinen as news paper reading soldier
- Minna Häkli as young girl in Keskitalo
- Heikki Kallio as White Guard soldier
- Kalevi Karhu as soldier
- Jari Kinnunen as young soldier
- Antero Kokkonen as White Guard patrol leader
- Kalle Kyllönen as soldier
- Kari Kyllönen as a villager in Keskitalo
- Pirkko Kyllönen as a villager in Keskitalo
- Pentti Lampinen as a soldier harassing Anna
- Pekka Litja as boy of Keskitalo
- Raimo Nyyssönen as young boy in Keskitalo
- Arttu Peltomaa as small child in Keskitalo
- Heikki Piirainen as a soldier telling dirty stories
- Martti Piirainen as drunk old Oman at the dance party
- Mauri Piirainen as White Guard soldier
- Annakaisa Pölönen as unidentified role
- Eira Pulkkinen as a woman in Keskitalo
- Maija Pääkkönen as a woman in the hay field
- Kaisu Rahikainen as Janne's mother
- Maarit Rahikainen as Janne's sister
- Mia Rahikainen as Janne's sister
- Minna Rahikainen as Janne's sister
- Outi Rahikainen as Janne's sister
- Mika Rytkönen as a child in Keskitalo
- Terttu Rytkönen as a woman in Keskitalo
- Matti Tervo as a child in Keskitalo
- Elina Peltomaa as a woman breast feeding a small child inside the house
- Vekku-dog as a dog
