= Raimo Grönberg =

Finnish actor (born 1953)

- Born: 8 March 1953 (age 73); Oulu, Finland
- Years active: 1978 - present

Raimo Grönberg (born 8 March 1953 in Oulu, Finland) is a Finnish actor whose career has mainly based on television.

Grönberg began acting in 1978 on television working consistently throughout the 1980s and 1990s appearing in a number of TV series. In film he starred in 1978's The Guarded Village 1944 (Finnish: Vartioitu kylä 1944), the 2003 film Sibelius working with Finnish director Timo Koivusalo and actors such as Martti Suosalo, Heikki Nousiainen, Seela Sella, Miina Turunen and Vesa Vierikko.

He once again worked with director Koivusalo in Kaksipäisen kotkan varjossa in 2005. He is scheduled to star in another Koivusalo film Täällä Pohjantähden alla in 2009.

2009–2013 Grönberg played Seargeant Härmälä in very popular Finnish countryside drama series Pirunpelto. Grönberg is also known as Gunnar Mustavaara in MTV3's soap opera Salatut elämät (2017–). In 2018 he appeared in crime drama series Deadwind.
