= Yaacov Bergman =

Israeli-born conductor (1945–2023)

- יעקב ברגמן
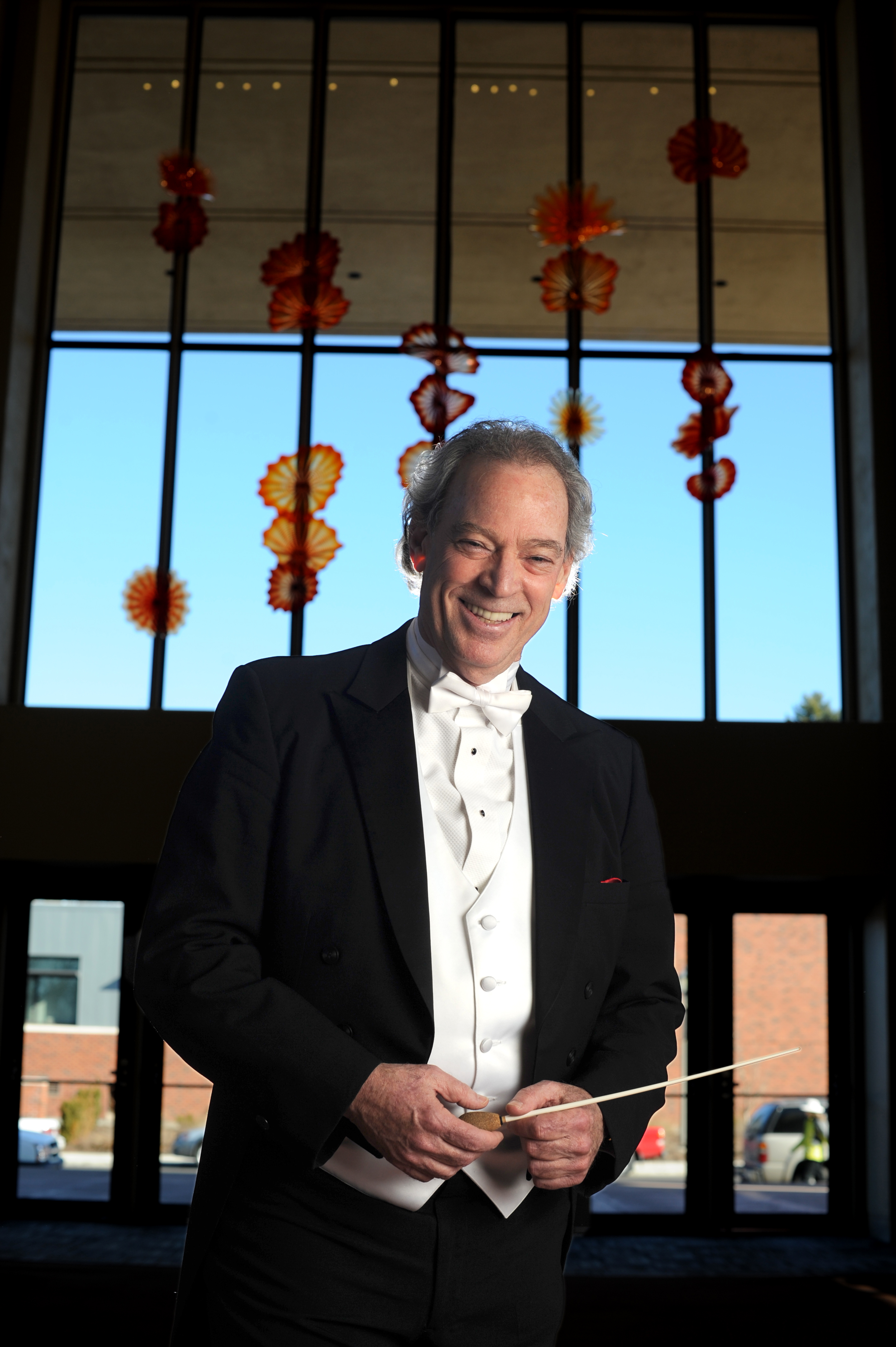
- Bergman before a 2012 Walla Walla Symphony Concert
- Born: May 31, 1945; Israel
- Died: September 20, 2023 (aged 78)
- Education: Jerusalem Academy of Music and Dance; Mannes College of Music
- Occupation: Conductor
- Organizations: Walla Walla Symphony; Portland Chamber Orchestra; Siletz Bay Music Festival

Yaacov Bergman (Hebrew: יעקב ברגמן; 31 May 1945 – 20 September 2023) was an Israeli-born conductor. He was the musical director and conductor of the Walla Walla Symphony from 1987 until his death, conductor of the Portland Chamber Orchestra, and artistic director of the Siletz Bay Music Festival in Oregon. He conducted as a guest worldwide.

== Early years ==
Born in Israel, Bergman took lessons in violin and singing early, but soon was interested in composing and conducting. He studied at the Jerusalem Academy of Music and Dance in conducting and composition, and took post-graduate studies at the Mannes College of Music in New York with Richard Westenburg. He studied conducting further with Charles Bruck, a student of Pierre Monteux, as well as privately with Leonard Bernstein. In 1998 he was granted an honorary doctorate from Colorado Technical University.

He was musical director of the Colorado Springs Symphony, the New York Heritage Chamber Orchestra, and the 92nd St. Y Symphonic Workshop Orchestra in New York City. He was the musical director and conductor of the Walla Walla Symphony from 1987 until his death. He was also conductor of the Portland Chamber Orchestra, and artistic director and conductor of the Siletz Bay Music Festival in Lincoln City, Oregon.

== International tours ==
His success in July 1996 in Japan as conductor of the Osaka Opera Company's premiere performance of Verdi's opera Macbeth led to subsequent engagements which included La Traviata in Osaka and Kobe. Bergman guest-conducted with the Osaka Symphonica, a concert tour with the Israel Chamber Orchestra, and he served as principal guest-conductor of the North Atlantic Music Festival in Denmark shortly before his death. Bergman conducted a series of successful symphonic concerts in Cairo in 1995 and 1996 as the first Israeli conductor to appear in an Arab republic. Bergman was engaged in a series of performances of Puccini's La Bohème in the Philippines, and performances of Mozart's Don Giovanni, Bizet's Carmen, Puccini's Tosca, and La Traviata for the Cultural Center of the Philippines in Manila, where he also conducted numerous symphonic concerts as principal guest conductor of the Philippine Philharmonic Orchestra.

== North America visits ==
Bergman guest-conducted with the Buffalo Philharmonic, the San Diego Symphony, the Edmonton Symphony in Canada, the West Virginia Symphony, the Redlands Symphony, a debut performance with the Vienna Radio Symphony Orchestra, and a third appearance with the Brooklyn Philharmonic in New York.

== World premieres ==
Bergman was interested in new music and multi-media concepts. He conducted world premieres of works by American composers including William Bolcom, Robert Starer, John Verrall and Gwyneth Walker, and by composers from around the world such as Tzvi Avni, Ofer Ben-Amots, Henryk Górecki, Giya Kancheli and Arvo Pärt.

== Personal life ==
Bergman was married to pianist and pedagogue Joan Behrens-Bergman.

Yaacov Bergman died on 20 September 2023, at the age of 78.
