= Heimo Haitto =

Finnish-American classical violinist (1925–1999)

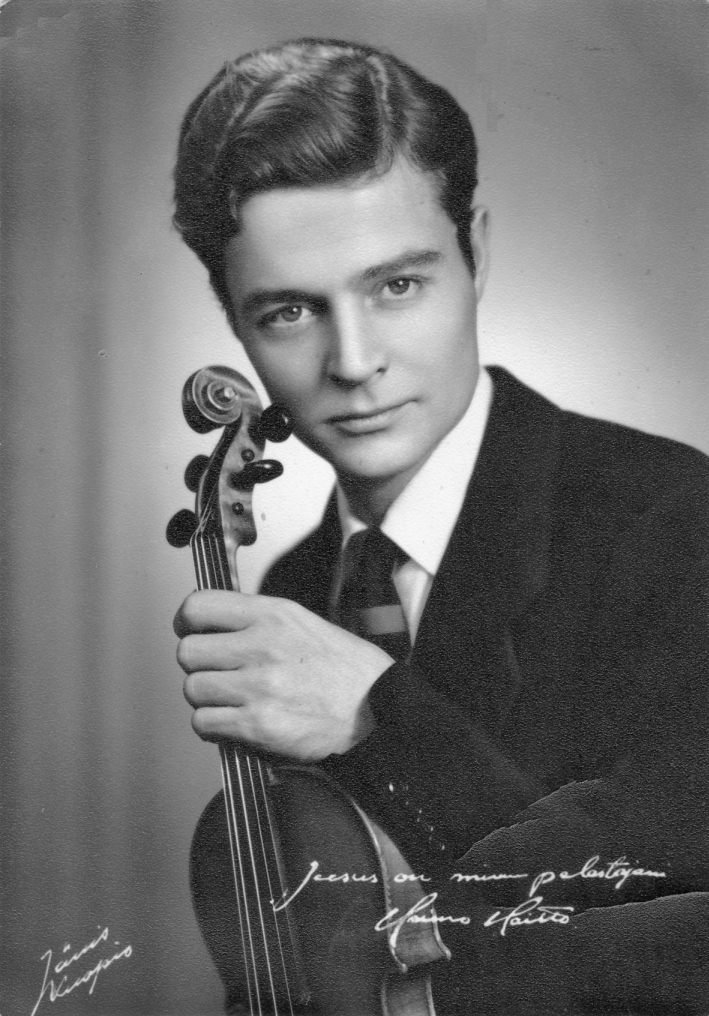
Heimo Haitto in the mid-1950s. The caption reads: “Jesus is my Saviour.”

Heimo Verneri Haitto (22 May 1925 – 9 June 1999) was a Finnish-American classical violinist who played in several U.S. symphony orchestras. A child prodigy, he was characterized as “Finland’s Jascha Heifetz”.

== Career ==
Heimo Haitto was born in Viipuri, Finland, to a family in which the father, a locomotive driver, was an amateur violinist. The son started to play violin as well, and the Russian-born pedagogue Boris Sirpo (1893–1967) took him not only as a student but as a foster son and raised him in Viipuri.

In 1939, the 13-year-old Haitto made his début with the Helsinki Philharmonic Orchestra, and later that year he won the British Council music prize. The young violinist become famous, and his story inspired a fictional film, Pikku pelimanni (The Little Player) of 1939, in which Haitto played the leading role.

During the Winter War, Haitto partook a Red Cross concert tour which also visited the United States for the benefit of Finland. Haitto played at Carnegie Hall with Sir John Barbirolli, among other venues, and appeared in the 1941 film The Hard-Boiled Canary. In 1942 Haitto and Sirpo settled down in Portland, Oregon, and Haitto studied with Ivan Galamian in 1943–1945. Haitto was known for his virtuosity: he played the compositions of Niccolò Paganini in a faultless way, and he loved the music of J. S. Bach.

In 1945 Haitto became U.S. citizen and he married the cellist Beverly Le Beck, a wealthy heiress. They moved to Hollywood and Haitto worked with the film industry, then he joined the Los Angeles Philharmonic Orchestra and played there till 1956. From the 1940s to 1960s, he also toured Finland and was awakened to Christianity in 1956. He played shorter periods also as a leader in the Metropolitan Opera orchestra and Hawaii Symphony. Haitto and Le Beck had two children, Nick and Kaarina.

After that, Haitto and his family moved to Switzerland and then Mexico, where he got the position of the leader in the Bellas Artes symphony orchestra, but ultimately his wife filed for a divorce because of his alcoholism and gambling. A dramatic change followed: Haitto left his family altogether, abandoned the violin and started to live as a vagabond in the U.S. and in Canada. The wandering life lasted till mid-1970s, when Haitto met the journalist Eva Vastari and they were married in Las Vegas in 1976. Haitto started to work as a musician again: he toured with his wife, accompanying her poetry recitals, first in the U.S., then they settled in Finland. He played in the Savonlinna Orchestra and the Joensuu Orchestra and taught at Savonlinna Conservatoire. He wrote two volumes of memoirs, remembering his wandering years.

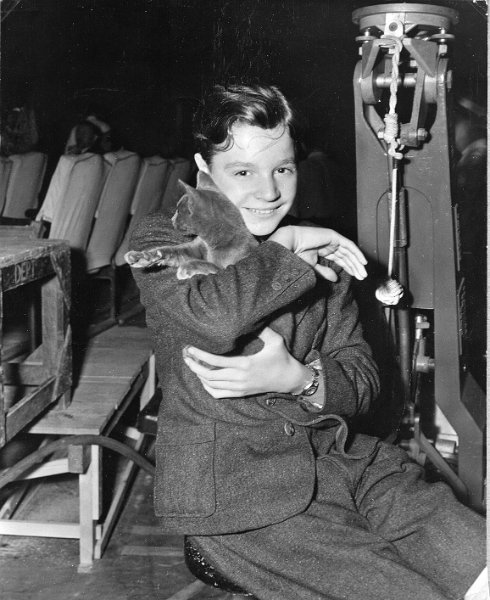
The young violinist while filming The Hard-Boiled Canary a.k.a. There’s Magic in Music in 1941.

Another film about his life followed in 1985: Da Capo by Pirjo Honkasalo and Pekka Lehto.

== Death and legacy ==
In the 1990s, Haitto suffered from hearing problems and he wasn't able to play anymore. He spent his last years in Marbella, Spain, with his wife, and died in 1999. He was buried in Marbella, but five years later his remains were moved to Helsinki's Hietaniemi cemetery.

Haitto made several EP, LP and tape recordings. Most of his recordings he did for Finnish Broadcasting Company Yleisradio. In 2013, some archival radio recordings of Yleisradio from 1964 were released on a CD. Haitto plays the Violin Concerto and six Humoresques by Jean Sibelius.

== Discography ==
- Heimo Haitto Plays Sibelius (Violin Concerto and Six Humoresques). RSO/Paavo Berglund. Finlandia Classics (2013)
- Heimo Haitto Live in Concert (Paganini/Vieuxtemps). RSO/Arvid Jansons and Ari Angervo. Finlandia Classics (2015)
- Heimo Haitto - Chaconne and Other Favourites. Finlandia Classics (2016)

== Literature ==
- Haitto, Heimo: Maailmalla. Helsinki: Kirjayhtymä, 1976. ISBN 951-26-1264-X
- Haitto, Heimo – Vastari, Eva: Viuluniekka kulkurina: Heimo Haiton vaellusvuodet Yhdysvalloissa 1965–76. Helsinki: Tammi, 1994. ISBN 951-31-0402-8
