= Tampere Comedy Theatre =

Theatre in Tampere, Finland

- Tampereen Komediateatteri
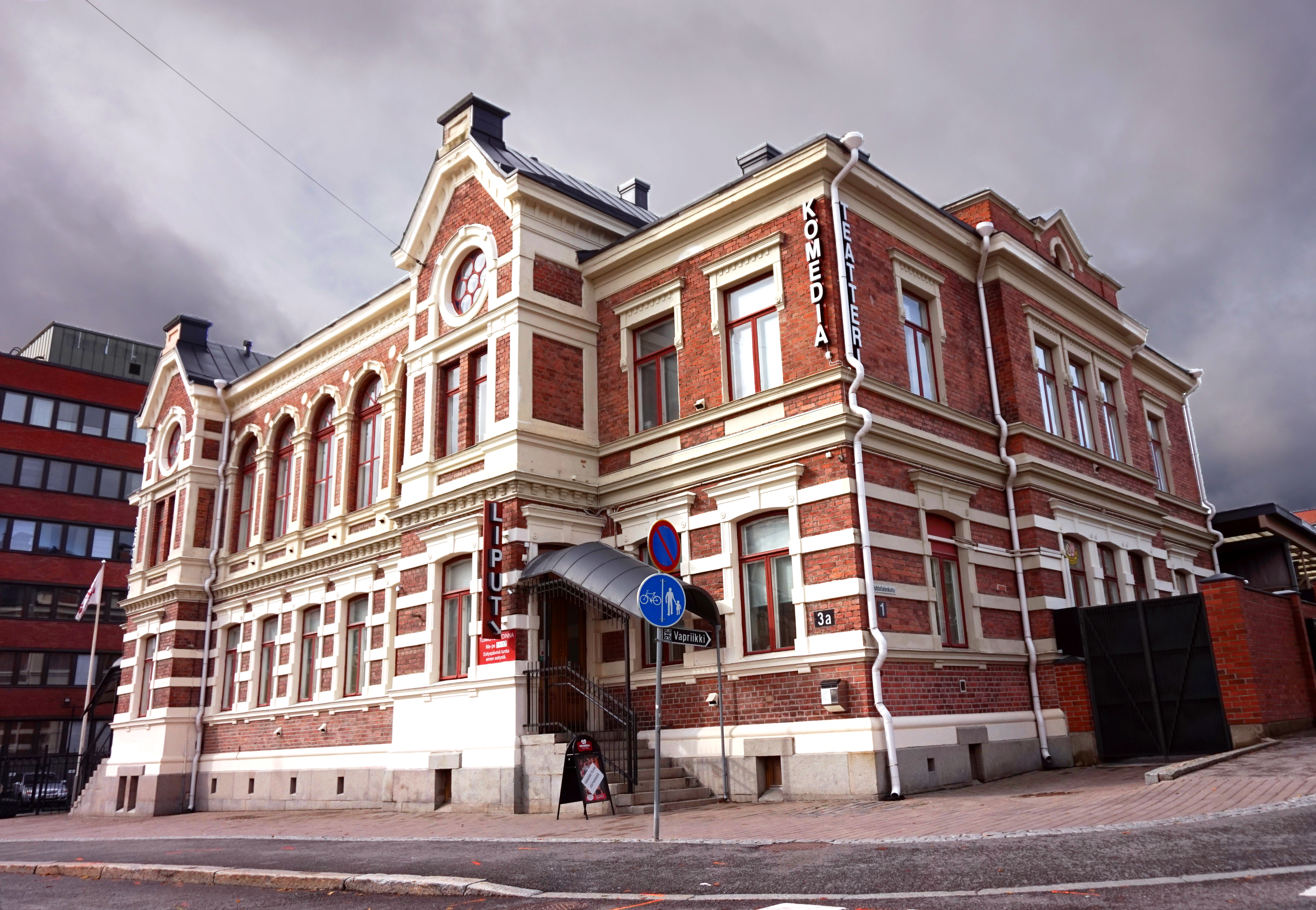
- Theatre in 2017
- Interactive map of Tampere Comedy Theatre
- Location: Tampere, Finland
- Coordinates: 61.5031°N 23.7653°E

Construction
- Built: 1897
- Opened: 1991
- Architect: Georg Schreck

Website
- https://www.komediateatteri.fi

Tampere Comedy Theatre (Finnish Tampereen Komediateatteri) is theatre in Tampere that focuses on comedy. It was founded in 1991 by actor Esko Raipia and screenwriter and director Tapio Parkkinen. The theatre's address is Lapintie 3, Tampere.

Since 1994 the theatre is operated from Juhlatalo, a historic building in Tampere that was completed in 1897 and designed by Georg Schreck. In 2006 a new stage that can fit 256 viewers was completed.

Apart from comedy, the theatre also hosts comedy and farces. Since 1994 a theatre institution (Suomen teatteriopisto) has operated from the premise of the same building. The institution educates both amateur and professional actors.
