= Boris Sirpo =

Musical artist (1893–1967)

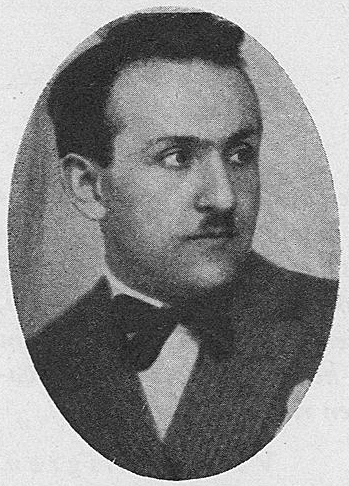
- Boris Sirpo in the late 1930s.

Background information
- Born: Boris Osipovich Kaufman; April 3, 1893; Vladikavkaz, North Ossetia, Russia
- Died: January 25, 1967 (aged 73) Portland, Oregon, United States of America
- Occupations: Violinist, conductor, composer, music educator

Boris Osipovich Sirpo (April 3, 1893 – January 25, 1967) was a Russian-born Finnish violinist, conductor, composer, and music educator. He was the founder of what is now the Lahti Conservatory in Lahti, Finland, as well as the Portland Chamber Orchestra.

== Early life and education ==
Boris Sirpo was born as Boris Osipovich Kaufman in Vladikavkaz, North Ossetia, Russia, on April 3, 1893. He studied music throughout Europe, including with Jean Sibelius, before making his debut with the Helsinki Philharmonic Orchestra in 1912.

== Early career ==
Sirpo established the Viipuri Conservatory ("Viipurin Musiikkiopisto") in Vyborg in 1918, and served as its director until 1939. In spring 1932, Sirpo and the Viipuri Chamber Orchestra performed with Bronislaw Huberman in Amsterdam, Rotterdam, Brussels, and Paris.

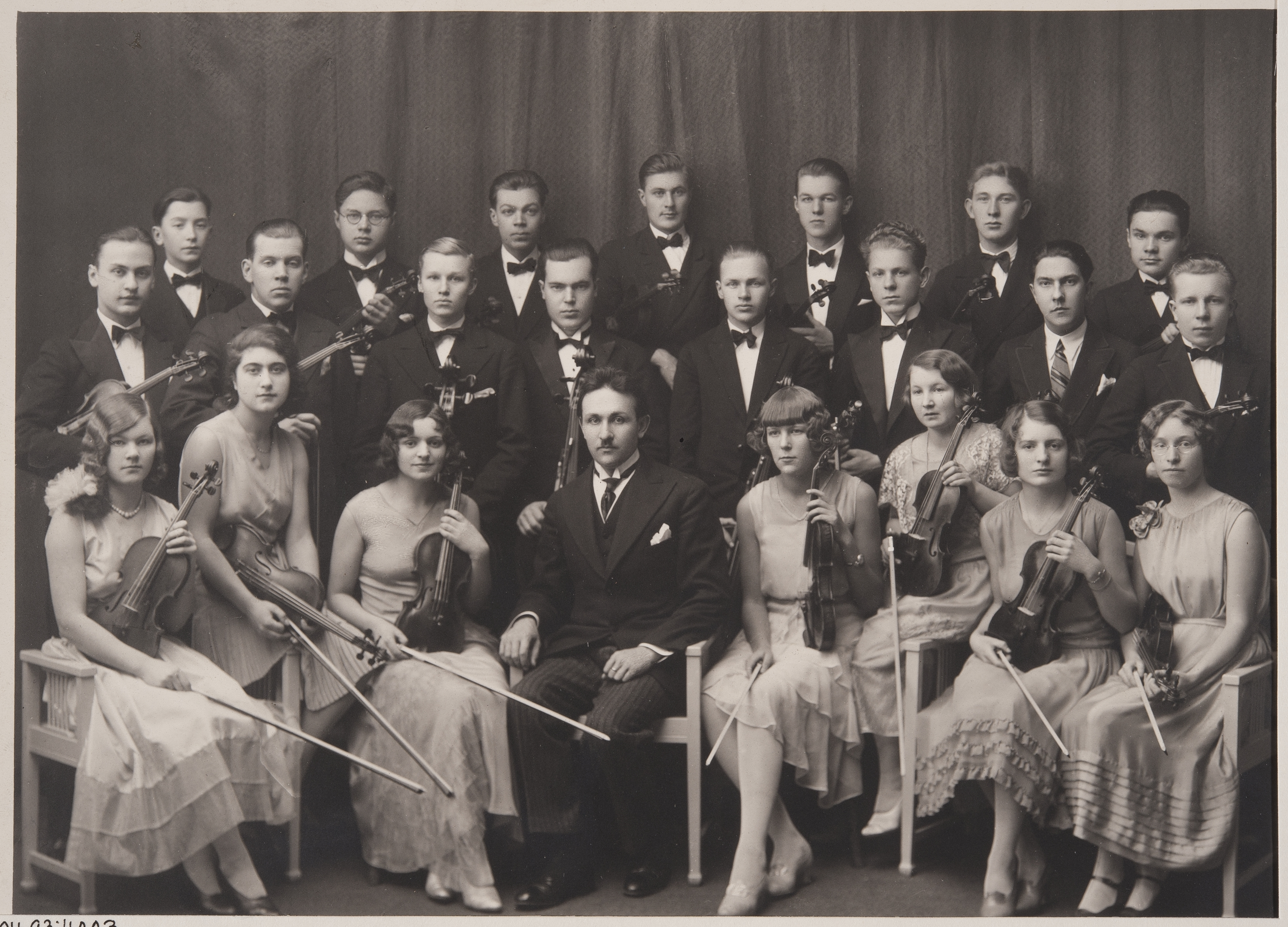
Photograph of the Viipuri Chamber Orchestra, circa 1920s; Sirpo is seated in the middle.

== World War II and move to the United States ==
Sirpo fostered and taught Heimo Haitto. As the Viipuri Conservatory was destroyed during the Winter War, Sirpo and Haitto left Vyborg and moved to the United States in early 1940. The two became increasingly distant as Hattito performed around the United States, exacerbated by the ending of their foster relationship.

Boris and his wife, Greta Sirpo, moved to Portland, Oregon in October 1941, where Boris began to teach lessons. In 1945, he accepted a faculty position at the Lewis & Clark College. In 1946, Sirpo founded the Portland Chamber Orchestra, today the oldest chamber orchestra in the United States. He also founded the all-female Little Portland Chamber Orchestra in 1953.

== Later life and death ==
Greta Sirpo died in Portland in December 1955; Boris Sirpo remarried his former student, Gretchen Sirpo.

Sirpo became a naturalized American citizen in the late 1950s.

Sirpo died on January 25, 1967, in Portland, Oregon, at the age of 73.

== Legacy ==
The Viipuri Conservatory, now the Lahti Conservatory ("Lahden Konserttitalo") was rebuilt in Lahti, Finland after World War II. Sirpo-Hall in the Lahti Conservatory is named after him.

== Awards and honors ==
During his lifetime, Boris Sirpo received the following awards and honors:

- Commander of the Order of Saint Stanislaus
- First Class Knight of the Order of the White Rose of Finland

Sirpo was awarded an honorary Doctor of Music degree from Lewis & Clark College in 1963.

== See also ==
- Da Capo
