= Walla Walla Symphony =

American orchestra

Walla Walla Symphony (WWS)
- Orchestra
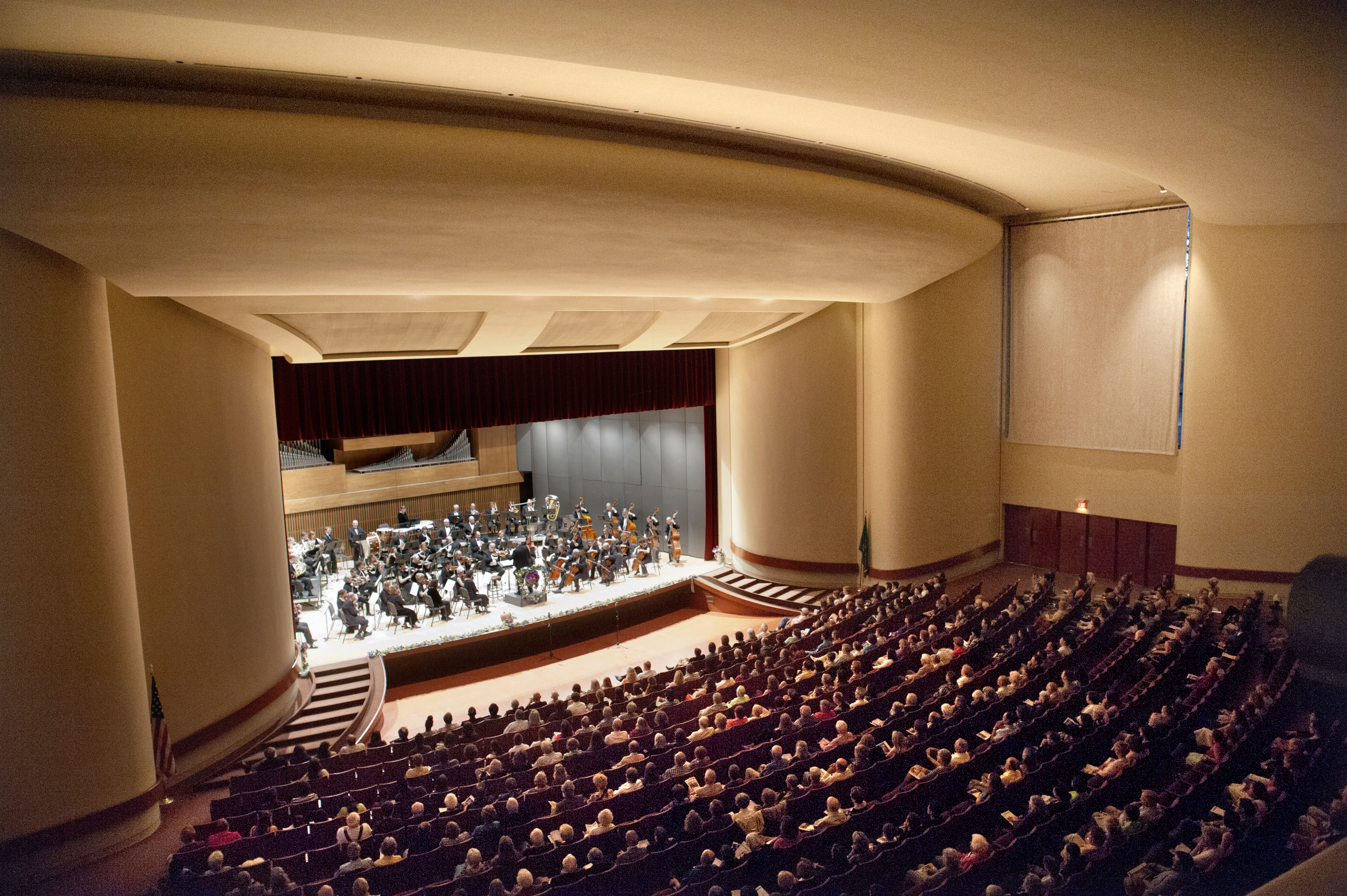
- Walla Walla Symphony April 2012 (Photo by Matthew Zimmerman Banderas)
- Founded: 1907
- Location: Walla Walla, Washington
- Concert hall: Cordiner Hall, Whitman College
- Website: wwsymphony.org

The Walla Walla Symphony is an orchestra based in Walla Walla, Washington. Founded in 1907, the Walla Walla Symphony is the "oldest continuously operating symphony west of the Mississippi". Yaacov Bergman was music director from 1987 until his death in 2023. The Walla Walla Symphony performs most of its concerts in Cordiner Hall located on Whitman College Campus and provides several different types of concerts throughout the year.

== History ==
The Walla Walla Symphony began with the formation of a "Symphony Club" in June 1907 by a small group who wanted to bring great music to their community. Following the adoption of a constitution and by-laws, the club's board of directors met for the first time on July 1. At a second meeting in September they voted to hire Edgar Fischer to direct an orchestra that would function as a separate entity from the music schools in the community.

The first performance of that 29-member group on December 12, 1907, was one of several activities during that season. The club held a series of meetings to study music, presented two more concerts, and sponsored a local performance by the nationally known New York Symphony Orchestra under the direction of Walter Damrosch. While that initial year was an exhilarating success, those that followed would be challenging as the orchestra's founders struggled with finances and often presented concerts to small audiences in less than ideal circumstances.

Walla Walla Symphony in 1925

Following the unexpected death of Edgar Fischer at age 49 in 1922, and after two years of interim leadership, Fischer's wife, Alice, a talented pianist and singer, assumed direction of the group. At a time when women conductors were rare, she proved to be an effective and inspiring leader and led the orchestra until it celebrated its 25th anniversary in 1932.

Although the Symphony Club, renamed Symphony Society, continued without break as an organization through the Great Depression years, it suspended concerts during the season following the 25th because of financial conditions in the community. After it resumed concerts in 1934, four conductors led the group over the next eleven years, with Walter Wren and Frank Beezhold, both accomplished violinists, each serving for four years.

The orchestra grew and flourished under Beezhold's leadership during the World War II years, because of the location of an Army air force base and military hospital in the community, and a Naval V-12 training program at Whitman College. As the war ended in 1945, Beezhold left to be concertmaster of the Seattle Symphony Orchestra.

Since his departure there have been five conductors. William Bailey, a teacher at Whitman College, followed Beezhold and served for a record 24 years. Jose Rambaldi, his successor, also a Whitman College faculty member, led the orchestra until 1976. Following an interim search year with several conductors, R. Lee Friese became conductor in 1977. With his departure in 1986, Cindy Egolf Sham-Rao conducted during a search year that ended with the selection of Yaacov Bergman, who conducted more concerts than any previous conductor.

Michael Wenberg, who joined the orchestra as a trombone player in 1998, was the orchestra's CEO from 2007 until his retirement in 2011.

The current CEO is Leah Wilson-Velasco.

== Music directors and conductors ==
- 1907-1922 Edgar Fischer
- 1922-1923 Gottfried Herbst
- 1923-1924 Karel Havlicek
- 1924-1934 Alice Reynolds Fischer
- 1934-1936 Victor Johnson
- 1936-1940 Walter Wren
- 1940-1941 Frank Beezhold
- 1941-1942 Nelson O. Schreiber
- 1942-1945 Frank Beezhold
- 1945-1969 William H. Bailey
- 1969-1976 Jose Rambaldi
- 1977-1986 R. Lee Friese
- 1986-1987 Cindy Egolf Sham-Rao
- 1987–2023 Yaacov Bergman
- 2024- Dina Gilbert

== World premiere compositions ==
- 1981 Symphony No. 47, "Walla Walla, Land of Many Waters," Alan Hovhaness
- 1989 The Legend of Chief Joseph, John Verrall
- 1993 Lyric Symphony, John Verrall
- 1994 Escapade, Marvin Schluger
- 1995 An American Concerto, Gwyneth Van Anden Walker
- 1996 The Manhattan Jazz Suite, Marvin Schluger
- 1997 Premiere Ouverture, Op. 23, Louise Farrenc (Modern World Premiere)
- 1998 Jazz Rhapsody for Piano and Orchestra, Marvin Schluger
- 1998 Christmas Fantasy for Jazz Quintet and Orchestra, David Glenn
- 2001 Symphony No. 2, John David Earnest
- 2001 Overture to the Millenium, Marvin Schluger
- 2001 Artist Portraits, David Glenn
- 2001 Chant and Improvisation, Tom Simon
- 2002 Piano Concerto, Tania Cronin
- 2005 Svanen, Elfrida Andrée (Modern World Premiere)
- 2006 Chasing the Light, William Berry
- 2006 Variations on a Gregorian Chant for Jazz Trio and Orchestra, Tom Simon
- 2007 Great River Percussion Concerto, Forrest Pierce
- 2007 A Valley of Streams for Jazz Quintet and Orchestra, David Glenn
- 2009 A Hamchilla Holiday, Parker Davis
- 2010 Blessings From the Children, Gwyneth Walker
- 2011 FanTAStic! A Celebration of 25 Fantastic Years, William Berry
