= Portland Chamber Orchestra =

American orchestra (founded 1946)

- Orchestra
- Founded: 1946
- Location: Portland, Oregon
- Concert hall: Kaul Auditorium, Reed College
- Principal conductor: Deanna Tham
- Website: www.portlandchamberorchestra.org

The Portland Chamber Orchestra was an orchestra based in Portland, Oregon. It was considered the oldest chamber orchestra in the United States until it closed in 2026. Founded in 1946 by Boris Sirpo, and hosted its first performance on May 27, 1947, at the Neighbors of Woodcraft Auditorium. Its home venue was at Lewis & Clark College.

== History ==
At the time of the orchestra's founding, Boris Sirpo, the founder, was a faculty member at Lewis & Clark College. Its early performers were female stringed instrument students at the college; this later changed to include those not actively studying there. The first concert performed in 1947 was a tour de force of performance which included Gluck's Overture to Orfeo ed Euridice, Corelli's Concerto Grosso, John Humphries's Concerto for Strings, Carl Stamitz's Orchestra Quartet, Paul Hindemith's Three Pieces for Strings, Jean Sibelius's Romance in C, A. Arensky's Variations on a Theme by Tschaikowsky, and Bach's Concerto in A Minor based on a Theme by Vivaldi.

== Music directors/conductors ==
- 1946-1966 Boris Sirpo
- 1967-1970 John Trudeau
- 1970-1992 Paul Bellam
- 1992 Sylvan Fremaux guest conductor
- 1992 Charles Schneider guest conductor
- 1993 Anthony Armore guest conductor
- 1993-1996 Charles Schneider
- 1996-2002 Anthony Armore
- 2002–2023 Yaacov Bergman
- 2025–Present Deanna Tham

== See also ==
- Culture of Portland, Oregon
