= Miina Turunen =

Finnish actress (born 1973)

- Born: 1973 (age 52–53); Kouvola, Finland

Miina Turunen (born 1973 in Kouvola, Finland) is a Finnish actress.

Turunen attended Kallio High School, a school in Helsinki which specialises in the performing arts, and graduated from the Helsinki Theatre Academy in 1997 with a Master's in theatre arts. She began her professional career in 1996, starring in the film Sirpaleita, and starred in the 2003 film Sibelius working with Finnish director Timo Koivusalo and actors such as Martti Suosalo, Heikki Nousiainen and Seela Sella. She has also appeared in many theatrical roles, including Sarasvatin hiekkaa with the Espoo City Theatre, an adaptation by the Finnish National Theatre of A Tale of Love and Darkness by Amos Oz. and as narrator in an adaptation she herself made for the Nukketeatterikeskus Poiju puppet theatre of "The Happy Prince" by Oscar Wilde.

== Filmography ==
- Sirpaleita (1996)
- Vastanaineet (1998) – Anna
- Sydänten akatemia (1998, TV series) – Marika Vasama
- Venny (2003, TV miniseries) – Mathilda 'Tilly' Soldan
- Sibelius (2003) – Aino Sibelius
- NDA – Salassapitosopimus (2005, TV) – Katariina Salo
