= Seela Sella =

Finnish actress (1936–2026)

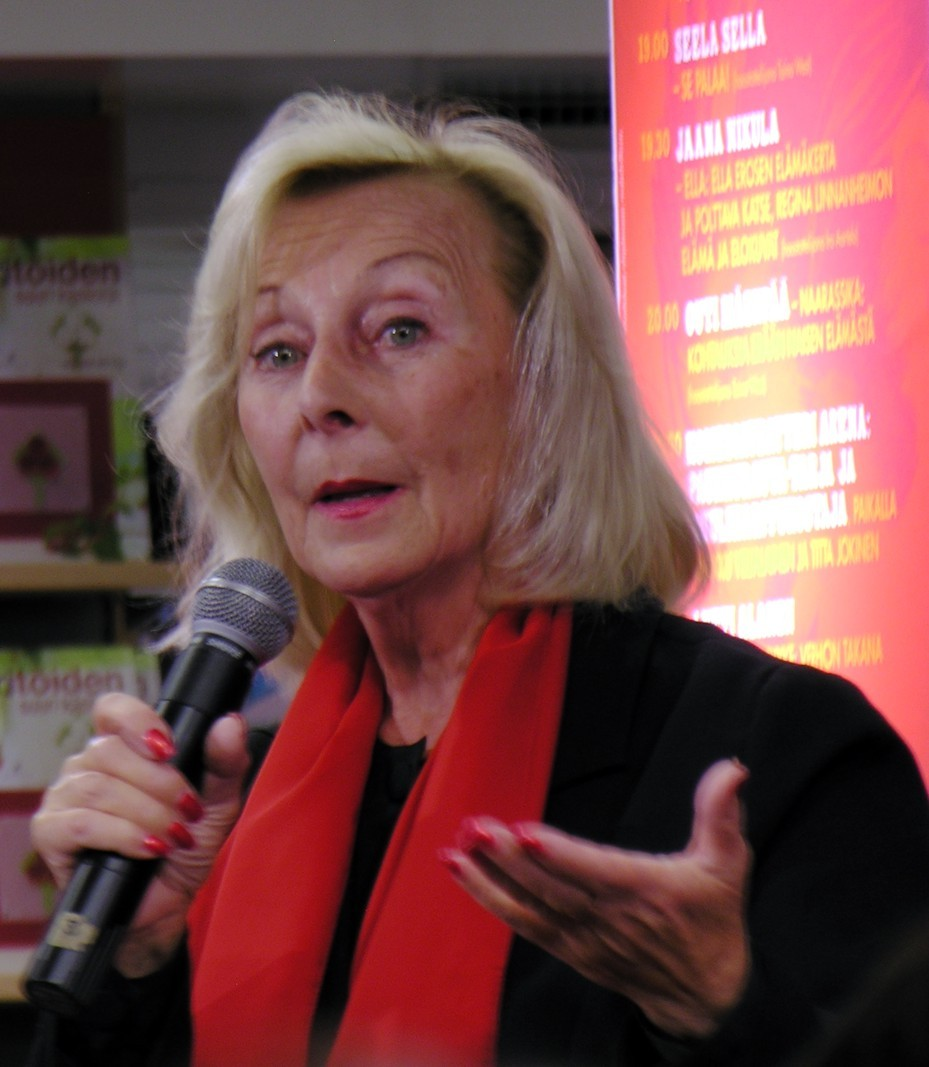
- Sella in 2008
- Born: Seela Maini Marjatta Virtanen; 30 December 1936; Tampere, Finland
- Died: 28 September 2026 (aged 89)
- Occupation: Actor
- Spouse: Elis Sella
- Awards: Jussi for Best Supporting Actress; 2007 Kalteva torni – Elsa; Venla for Best Actress; 2001 Sylvin kamari – Sylvi Kekkonen

Seela Sella (1959)

Seela Maini Marjatta Sella (née Virtanen; 30 December 1936 – 28 September 2026) was a Finnish actress.

== Early life and career ==
Seela Maini Marjatta Virtanen was born in Tampere, Finland, on 30 December 1936. During her career, which spanned more than 60 years, Seela Sella had roles in productions at the Finnish National Theatre, the TTT-Theatre, the Tampere Comedy Theatre, etc. and made almost 35 appearances in film and television. She also organized monologue, song and recital nights.

She worked with Finnish director Timo Koivusalo on a number of films such as Sibelius (2003) and Kalteva torni (2006). Sella also did voice-overs for the Finnish versions of such animated movies as A Bug's Life and The Emperor's New Groove.

Sella received an award for her work from the Alfred Kordelin Foundation in 2000.

== Personal life and death ==
Sella had two children. She converted to Judaism when she married the Finnish Jew Elis Sella.

Sella died from throat cancer on 28 September 2026, at the age of 89. She was buried in Helsinki Jewish Cemetery the following day.
