= Heikki Nousiainen =

Finnish actor (born 1945)

- Born: 19 June 1945 (age 79); Helsinki, Finland

Heikki Nousiainen (born 19 June 1945 in Helsinki, Finland) is a Finnish film and television actor. Nousiainen made his acting debut in the television movie Henrik ja Perinlla in 1967. He entered film in 1971, as both a director and an actor in Saatanan radikaalit and has made over 40 Finnish film and TV appearances to date. He has worked with Finnish director Timo Koivusalo on a number of films such as Sibelius in 2003 and Kaksipäisen kotkan varjossa (2005), as well as in other Finnish movies and TV series. In 2006 he starred in 3 different films. Nousiainen is also known as playing President Urho Kekkonen in TV series Vallan miehet (1986), Presidentit (2006) and Piru ja peijooni (2008).

== Filmography ==
- Henrik ja Pernilla (1967) (TV)
- Saatanan radikaalit (1971)
- Rakastunut rampa (1975)
- Lottovoittaja UKK Turhapuro (1976)
- Jäniksen vuosi (1977)
- Hullu kesä (1981)
- V.Y. Vihdoinkin yhdessä (1986)
- Lain ulkopuolella (1987)
- Kultainen koskelo (1989)
- Kiljusen herrasväen uudet seikkailut (1990)
- Keskiyön aurinko (1991)
- Mestari (1992)
- Maraton (1997)
- Pekko ja unissakävelijä (1997)
- Siivoton juttu (1997)
- Johtaja Uuno Turhapuro - pisnismies (1998)
- Kulkuri ja Joutsen (1999)
- Pelon maantiede (2000)
- Hurmaava joukkoitsemurha (2000)
- Ei siihen kuole (2003)
- Sibelius (2003)
- Lapsia ja aikuisia - Kuinka niitä tehdään? (2004)
- Paha maa (2005)
- Kaksipäisen kotkan varjossa (2005)
- Postia pappi Jaakobille (2009)
- Forbidden Fruit (2009)
- Euthanizer (2017)
- One Last Deal (2018)
