= 1909 =

1909 in various calendars
- Gregorian calendar: 1909; MCMIX
- Ab urbe condita: 2662
- Armenian calendar: 1358; ԹՎ ՌՅԾԸ
- Assyrian calendar: 6659
- Baháʼí calendar: 65–66
- Balinese saka calendar: 1830–1831
- Bengali calendar: 1315–1316
- Berber calendar: 2859
- British Regnal year: 8 Edw. 7 – 9 Edw. 7
- Buddhist calendar: 2453
- Burmese calendar: 1271
- Byzantine calendar: 7417–7418
- Chinese calendar: 戊申年 (Earth Monkey); 4606 or 4399 — to — 己酉年 (Earth Rooster); 4607 or 4400
- Coptic calendar: 1625–1626
- Discordian calendar: 3075
- Ethiopian calendar: 1901–1902
- Hebrew calendar: 5669–5670
- Hindu calendars
- Vikram Samvat: 1965–1966
- Shaka Samvat: 1830–1831
- Kali Yuga: 5009–5010
- Holocene calendar: 11909
- Igbo calendar: 909–910
- Iranian calendar: 1287–1288
- Islamic calendar: 1326–1327
- Japanese calendar: Meiji 42 (明治４２年)
- Javanese calendar: 1838–1839
- Julian calendar: Gregorian minus 13 days
- Korean calendar: 4242
- Minguo calendar: 3 before ROC 民前3年
- Nanakshahi calendar: 441
- Thai solar calendar: 2451–2452
- Tibetan calendar: ས་ཕོ་སྤྲེ་ལོ་ (male Earth-Monkey); 2035 or 1654 or 882 — to — ས་མོ་བྱ་ལོ་ (female Earth-Bird); 2036 or 1655 or 883

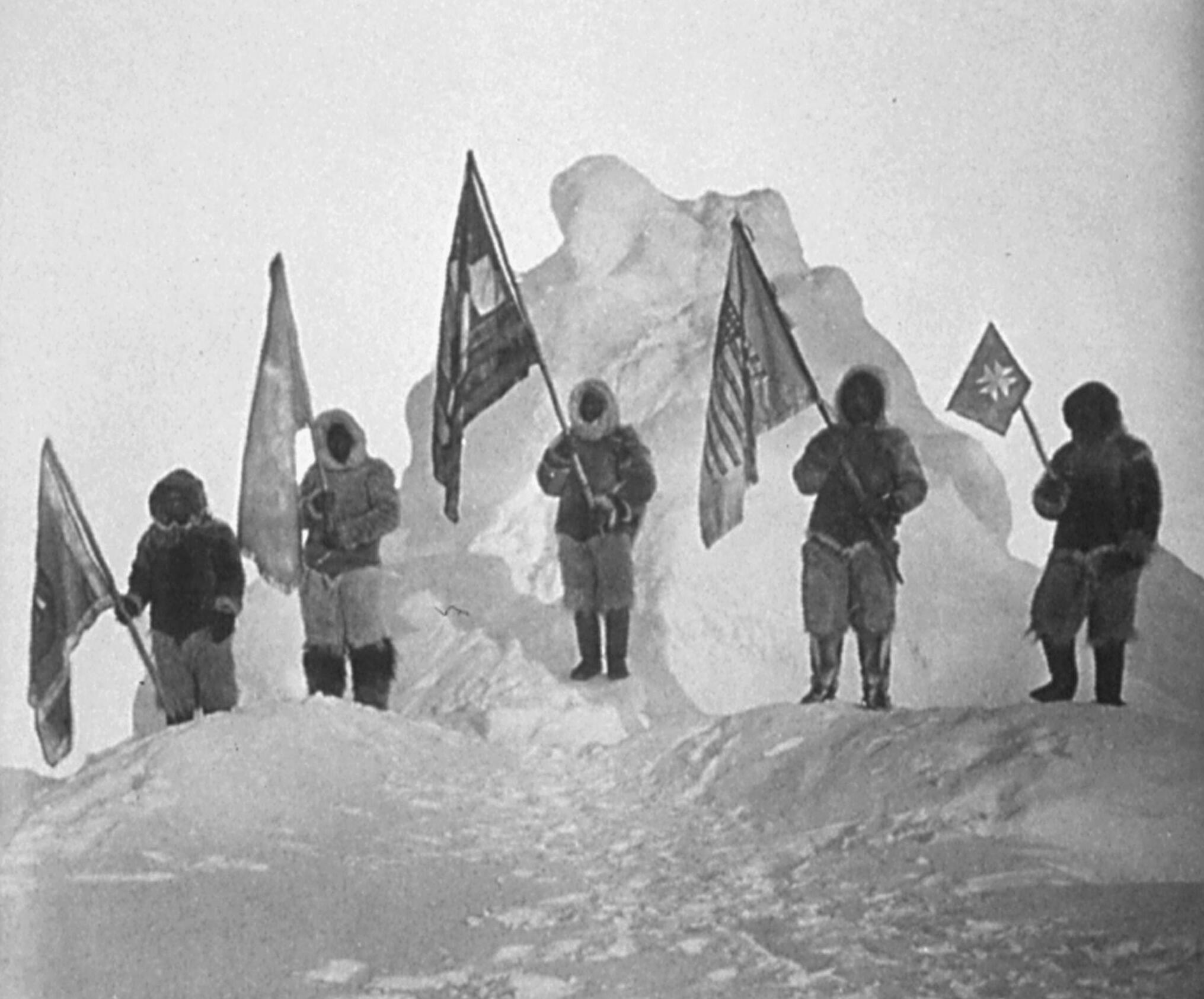
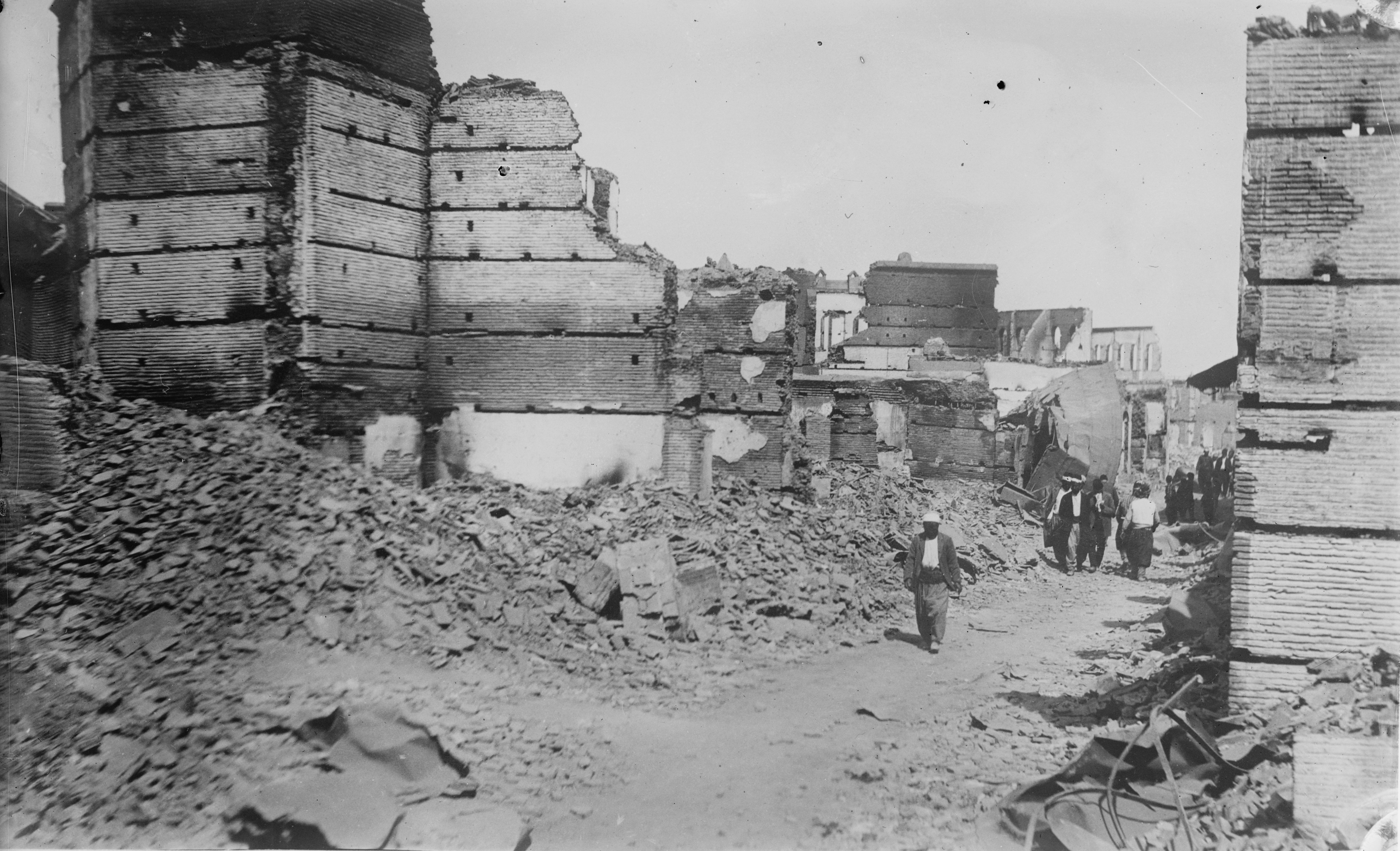
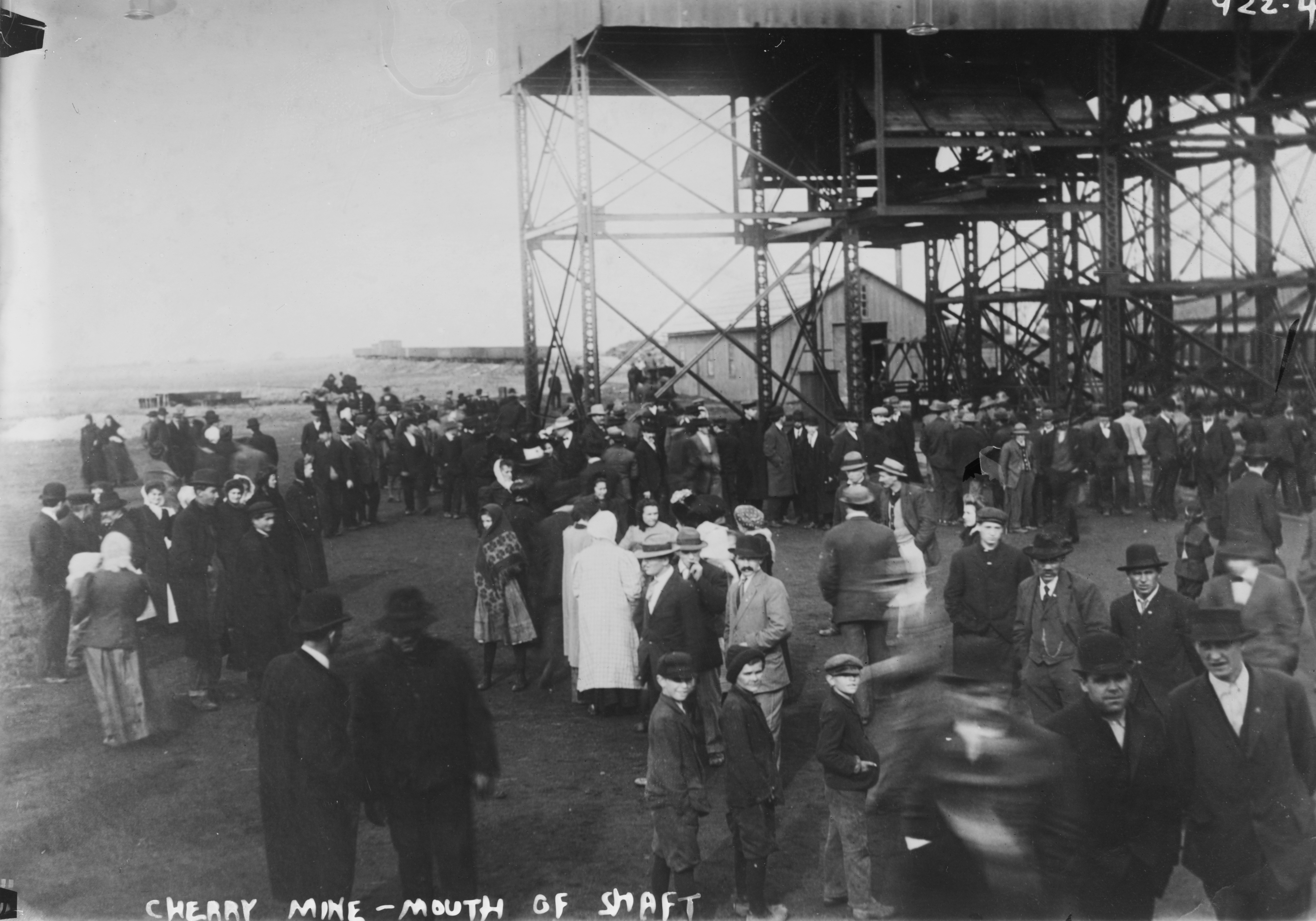
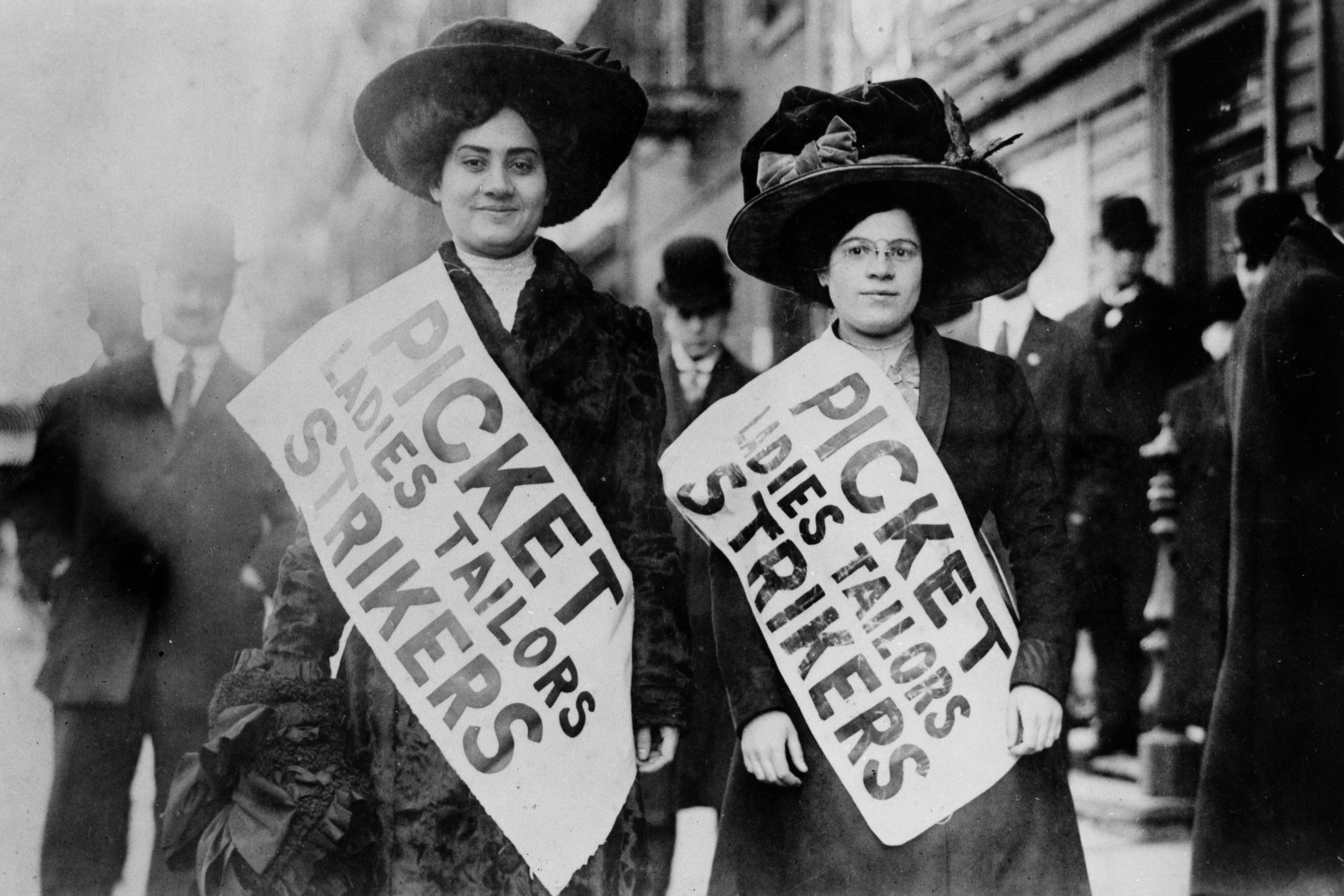
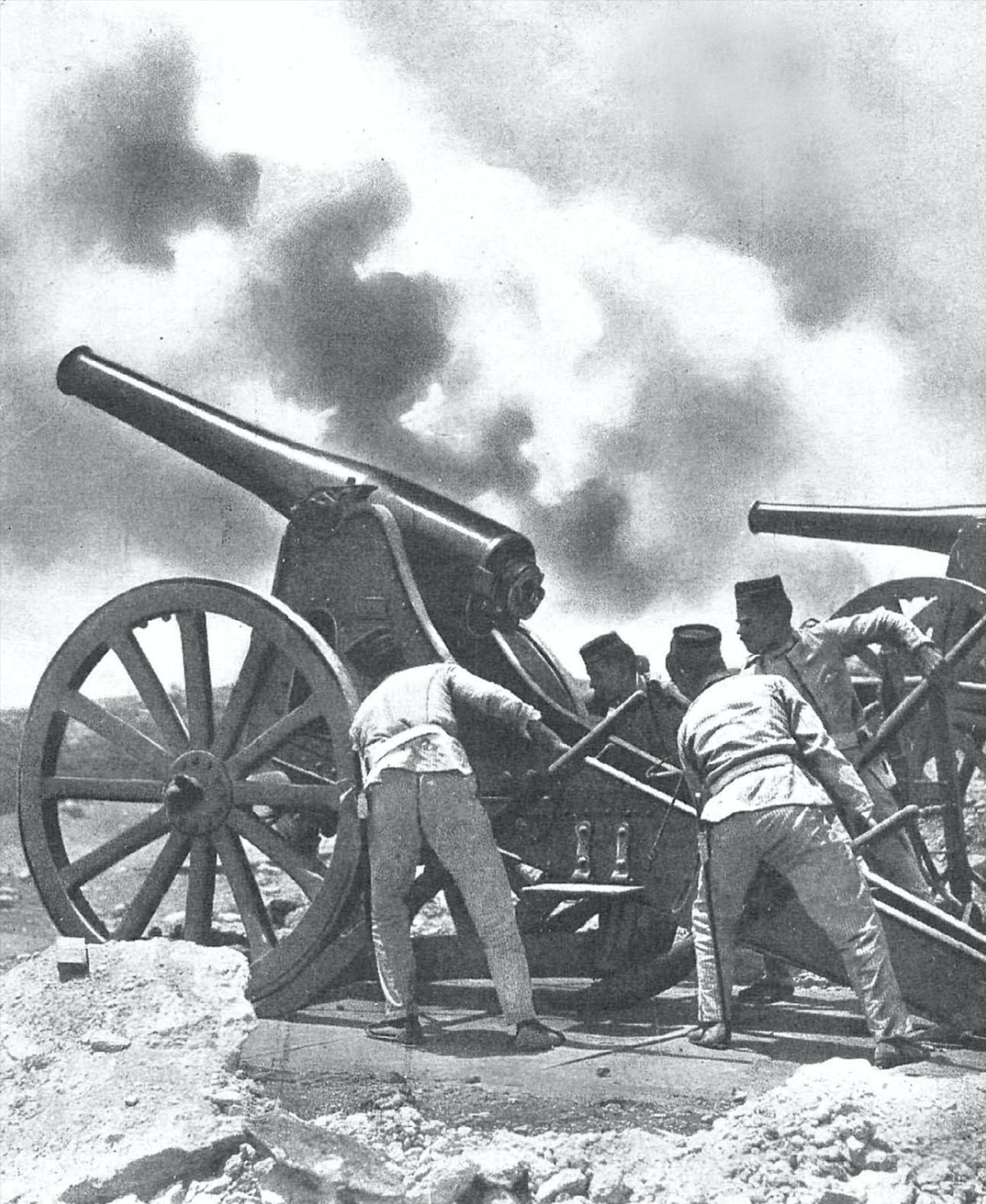
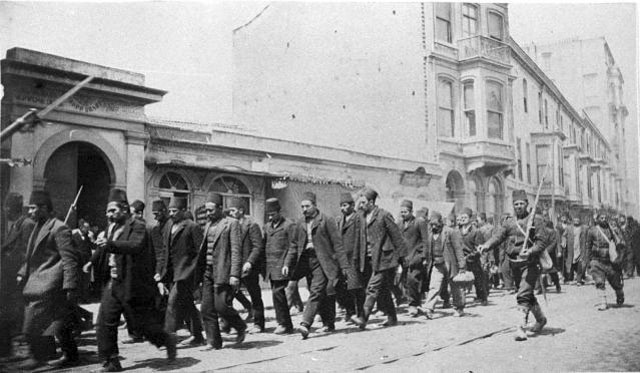
From top to bottom, left to right:
- American explorer Robert Peary claims to reach the North Pole, sparking debate over who arrived first;
- The Adana massacre in the Ottoman Empire kills thousands of Armenians;
- The Cherry Mine disaster in Illinois claims 259 miners, one of the deadliest U.S. coal accidents;
- The New York shirtwaist strike of 1909 sees mainly immigrant women demand better wages and working conditions in the largest U.S. women's strike;
- The Second Melillan campaign involves Spain fighting Rif tribes in northern Morocco;
- The 31 March Incident in the Ottoman Empire is suppressed, strengthening Young Turk control.

1909 (MCMIX) was a common year starting on Friday of the Gregorian calendar and a common year starting on Thursday of the Julian calendar, the 1909th year of the Common Era (CE) and Anno Domini (AD) designations, the 909th year of the 2nd millennium, the 9th year of the 20th century, and the 10th and last year of the 1900s decade. As of the start of 1909, the Gregorian calendar was 13 days ahead of the Julian calendar, which remained in localized use until 1923.

British supercentenarian Ethel Caterham is the last surviving person who was born in 1909.

== Events ==
=== January–February ===
- January 7 – Colombia recognizes the independence of Panama.
- January 9 – The British Nimrod Expedition to the South Pole, led by Ernest Shackleton, arrives at the farthest south reached by any prior expedition, at 88°23' S, prior to turning back due to diminishing supplies.
- January 11 – The International Joint Commission on US-Canada boundary waters is established.
- January 16 – Members of the Nimrod Expedition claim to have found the magnetic South Pole (but the location recorded may be incorrect).
- January 24 – The White Star Line RMS Republic sinks the day after a collision with SS Florida off Nantucket. Almost all of the 1,500 passengers are rescued.
- January 28 – The last United States troops leave Cuba, after being there since the Spanish–American War of 1898.
- February 2 – The Paris Film Congress opens. It is an attempt to create a cartel of leading European producers similar to the MPPC in the United States.
- February 5 – Leo Baekeland announces the creation of bakelite hard thermosetting plastic.

=== March–April ===
- March 10 – The Anglo-Siamese Treaty of 1909 is signed in Bangkok.
- March 18 – Einar Dessau uses a shortwave radio transmitter in Denmark.
- March 21 – The remains of the Báb are placed in the Baháʼí Shrine of the Báb on Mount Carmel in Haifa, at this time within the Ottoman Empire.
- March 31 – Serbia accepts Austrian control over Bosnia and Herzegovina.
- March 31 – Construction begins on the RMS Titanic, at the Harland and Wolff Shipyard in Belfast.
- April 4 – The association football team Sport Club Internacional is founded in Porto Alegre, Brazil.
- April 6 – Robert Peary, Matthew Henson and four Inuit explorers – Ootah, Ooqueah, Seegloo and Egigingwah – come within a few miles of the North Pole.
- April 9 – The Payne–Aldrich Tariff Act is passed in the United States Congress.
- April 11 – The city of Tel Aviv (known in its first year as Ahuzat Bayit) is founded by the Jewish community, on the outskirts of Jaffa (at this time in the Ottoman Empire).
- April 13 (March 31 by Eastern reckoning) – A countercoup begins in the Ottoman Empire.
- April 14 – Adana massacre: Ottoman Turks kill 15,000–30,000 Armenian Christians, in the Adana Vilayet.
- April 18 – Joan of Arc is beatified in Rome.
- April 19 – The Anglo-Persian Oil Company (modern-day BP) is incorporated.
- April 23 – In Portugal, a magnitude 6.0 earthquake strikes near Lisbon, killing at least 60 people.
- April 27 – Sultan of the Ottoman Empire Abdul Hamid II is overthrown and succeeded by his brother, Mehmed V.

=== May–June ===
- May 19 – Russian ballet is brought to the Western world when the Ballets Russes opens a tour produced by Sergei Diaghilev at the Théâtre du Châtelet in Paris, with 55 dancers, including Vaslav Nijinsky.
- June 2 – French forces capture Abéché, capital of the Wadai Empire in central Africa.
- June 15 – Representatives from England, Australia and South Africa meet at Lord's Cricket Ground in London and form the Imperial Cricket Conference.

=== July–August ===
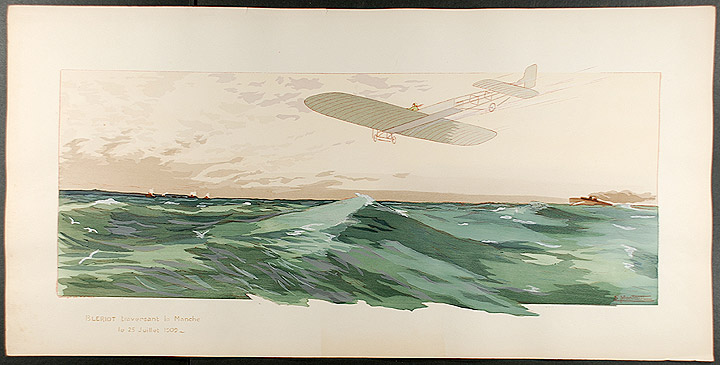
July 25: Louis Blériot crosses the English Channel

- July 1 – In London, Indian nationalist student Madan Lal Dhingra assassinates Curzon Wyllie, political aide to the Secretary of State for India.
- July 16 – A revolution forces Mohammad Ali Shah of the Qajar dynasty to abdicate in favor of his son Ahmad Shah Qajar. He proceeds to leave Persia for the Russian Empire, reportedly seeking the assistance of Nicholas II of Russia in regaining the throne.
- July 25 – Louis Blériot is the first man to fly across the English Channel (thus a large open body of water) in a heavier-than-air craft.
- July 25–August 2 – "Tragic Week" (La Semana Trágica/la Setmana Tràgica): The city of Barcelona experiences a workers' uprising.
- July 26 – Blue Anchor Line passenger/cargo liner SS Waratah, on her second voyage from Australia to Britain, leaves Durban and is lost without trace with all 211 aboard.
- August 2 – The United States Army Signal Corp Division purchases the world's first military airplane, a Wright Military Flyer, from the Wright brothers.
- August 8 – Max Heindel formally founds the Rosicrucian Fellowship in Seattle, Washington.

=== September–October ===
- September 4 – Japan and China sign the Gando Convention, which gives Japan a way to receive railroad concessions in Manchuria.
- October – Suzuki Weaving Machine Manufacturing, predecessor of the Suzuki motorbike and compact car brand in Japan, is founded in Shizuoka Prefecture.
- October 8 – An earthquake in the Zagreb area leads Andrija Mohorovičić to identify the Mohorovičić discontinuity.
- October 12 – The association football team Coritiba is founded in Curitiba, Brazil.
- October 13 – An agreement by Germany, Italy and Switzerland gives the Germans and Italians access to the Gotthard Rail Tunnel.
- October 26 – Itō Hirobumi, four time Prime Minister of Japan (the 1st, 5th, 7th and 10th) and Resident-General of Korea, is assassinated by An Jung-geun, an activist of the Korean independence movement, at the Harbin railway station in Manchuria.

=== November–December ===
- November 18 – In Nicaragua, 500 revolutionaries (including 2 Americans) are executed by order of dictator José Santos Zelaya. The United States responds by sending 2 warships.
- November 28 – Sergei Rachmaninoff's Piano Concerto No. 3 is premièred in New York City with the composer as soloist.
- December 14 – New South Wales Premier Charles Wade signs the Seat of Government Surrender Act 1909, formally completing the transfer of State land to the Commonwealth, to create the Australian Capital Territory.
- December 19 – The association football team Borussia Dortmund is founded in Dortmund, Germany.
- December 23 – King Albert I of Belgium succeeds his uncle, Leopold II (died December 17), on the throne.
- December 28 – The first manned heavier-than-air powered flight in South Africa is made at East London, by French aviator Albert Kimmerling, in a Voisin 1907 biplane.

=== Undated ===
- Karl Landsteiner, Constantin Levaditi and Erwin Popper first isolate the poliovirus.

== Births ==
=== January to April ===
==== January ====
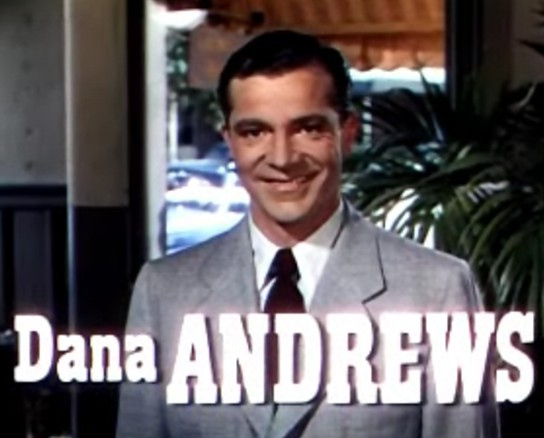
Dana Andrews

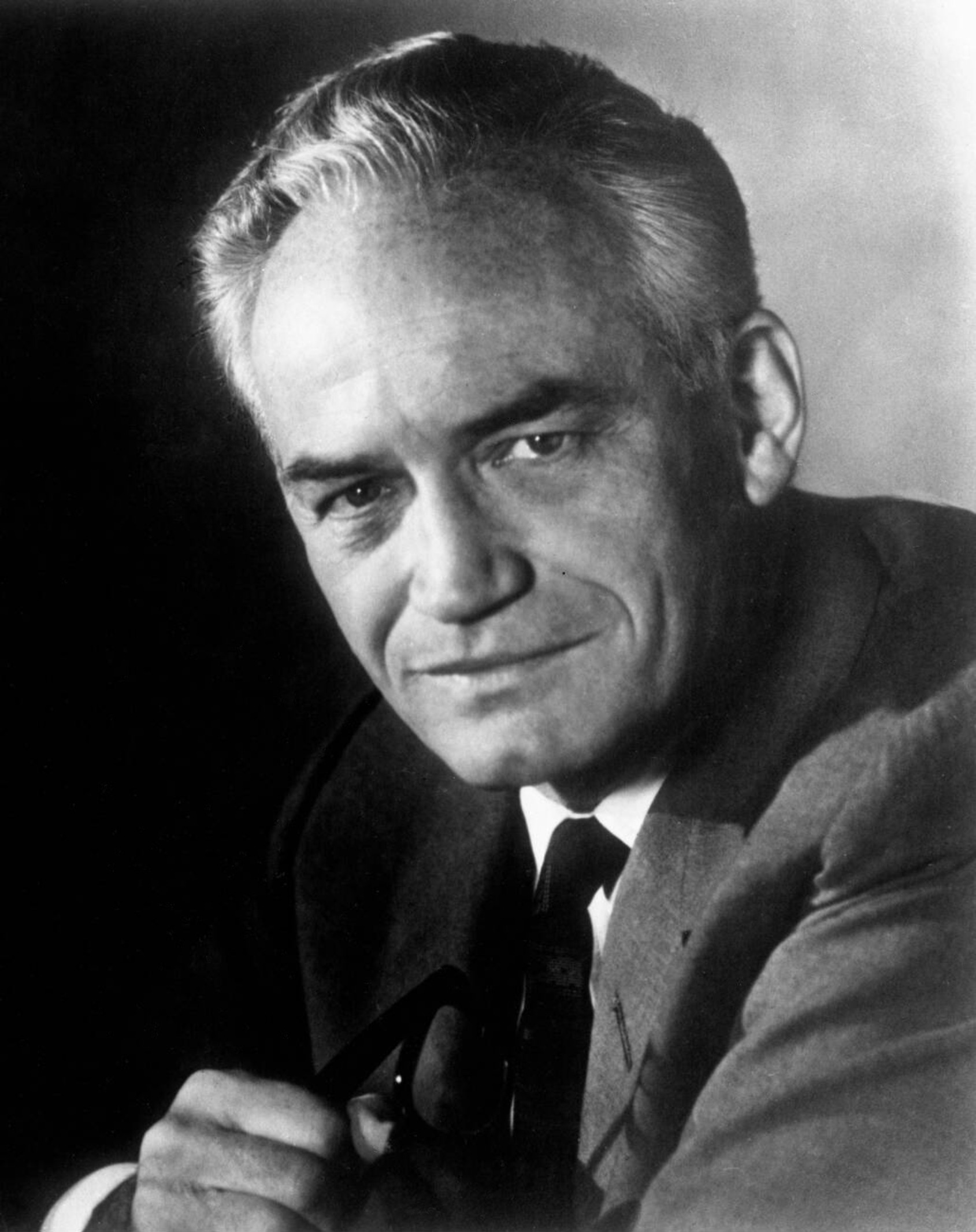
Barry Goldwater

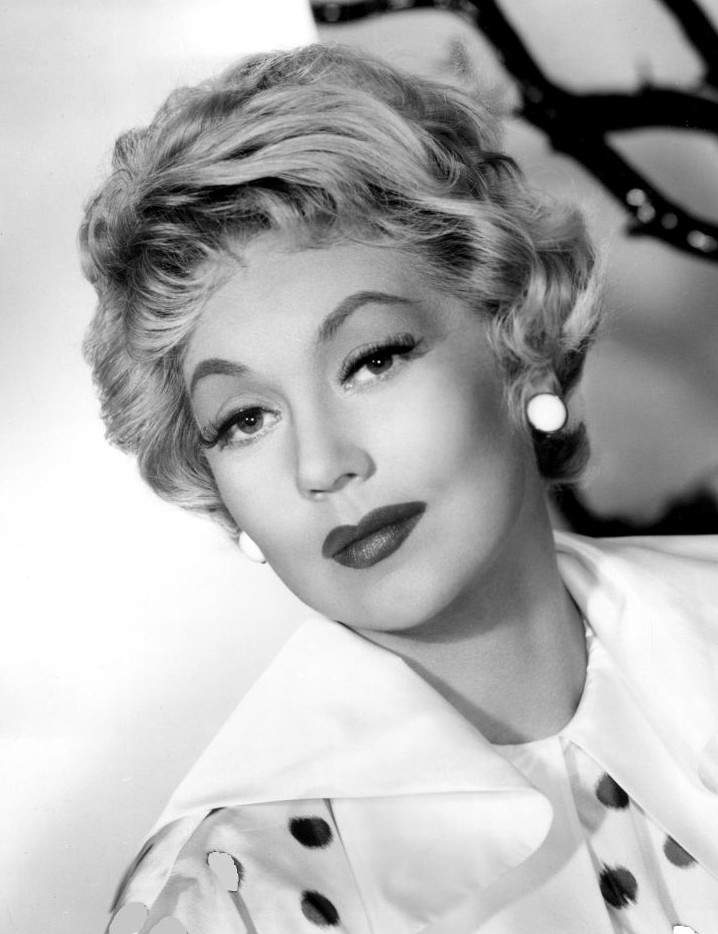
Ann Sothern

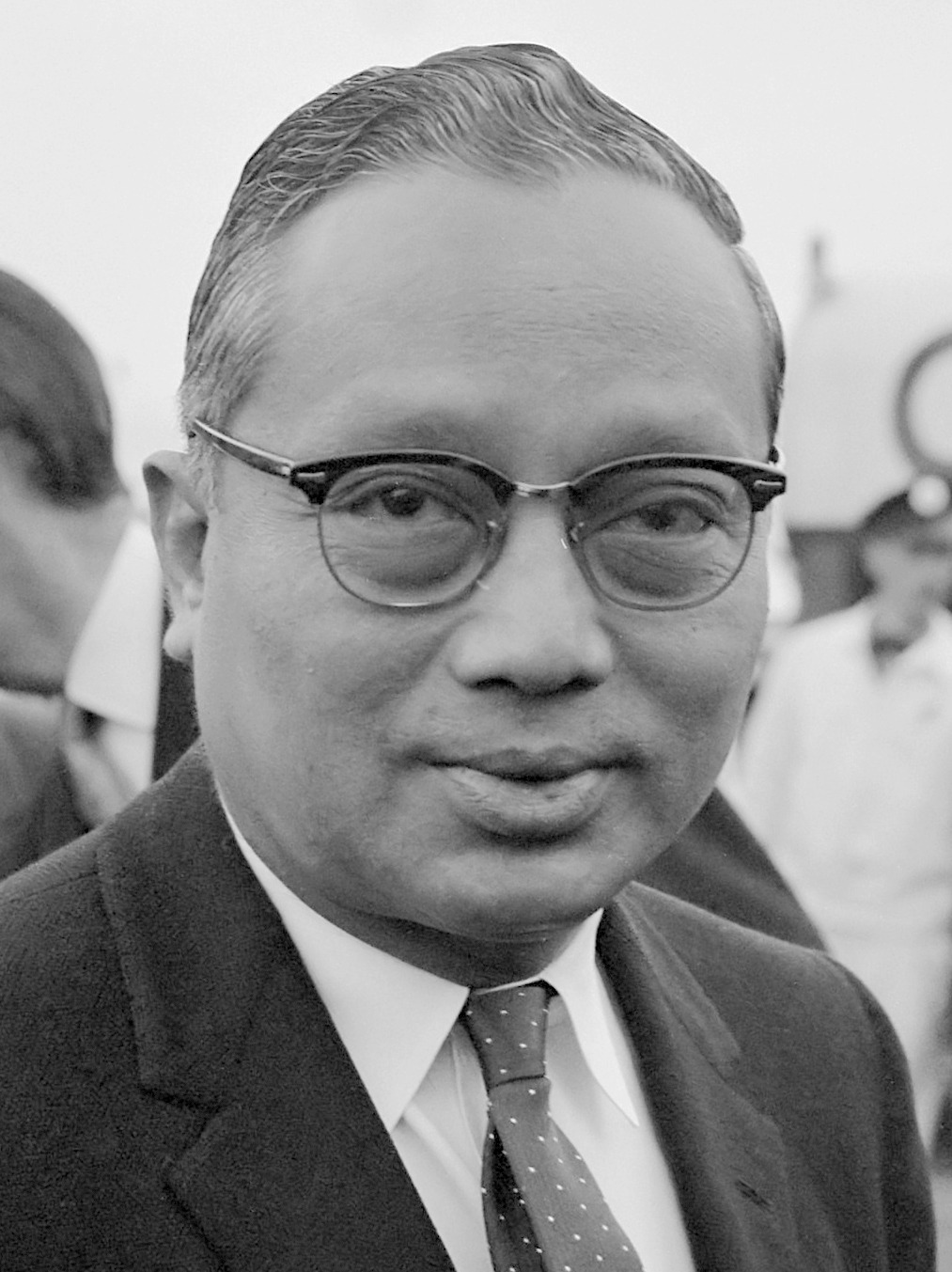
U Thant

- January 1
  - Dana Andrews, American actor (d. 1992)
  - Stepan Bandera, Ukrainian nationalist leader (d. 1959)
- January 2 – Barry Goldwater, American politician (d. 1998)
- January 3 – Victor Borge, Danish-born American entertainer (d. 2000)
- January 5 – Stephen Cole Kleene, American mathematician (d. 1994)
- January 9
  - Anthony Mamo, 1st President of Malta (d. 2008)
  - Patrick Peyton, Irish-born American priest, saint (d. 1992)
- January 13 – Marinus van der Lubbe, Dutch communist convicted of setting fire to the German Reichstag building in 1933 (executed 1934)
- January 15
  - Jean Bugatti, German-born automobile designer (d. 1939)
  - Gene Krupa, American jazz drummer (d. 1973)
- January 19 – Hans Hotter, German bass-baritone (d. 2003)
- January 22
  - Porfirio Rubirosa, Dominican diplomat, race-car driver and polo player (d. 1965)
  - Ann Sothern, American actress (d. 2001)
  - U Thant, Burmese United Nations Secretary General (d. 1974)
- January 24 – Martin Lings, British Islamic scholar (d. 2005)
- January 25 – Robert Rex, 1st Premier of Niue (d. 1992)
- January 28 – Colin Munro MacLeod, Canadian-American geneticist (d. 1972)
- January 30 – Saul Alinsky, American community organizer (d. 1972)

==== February ====
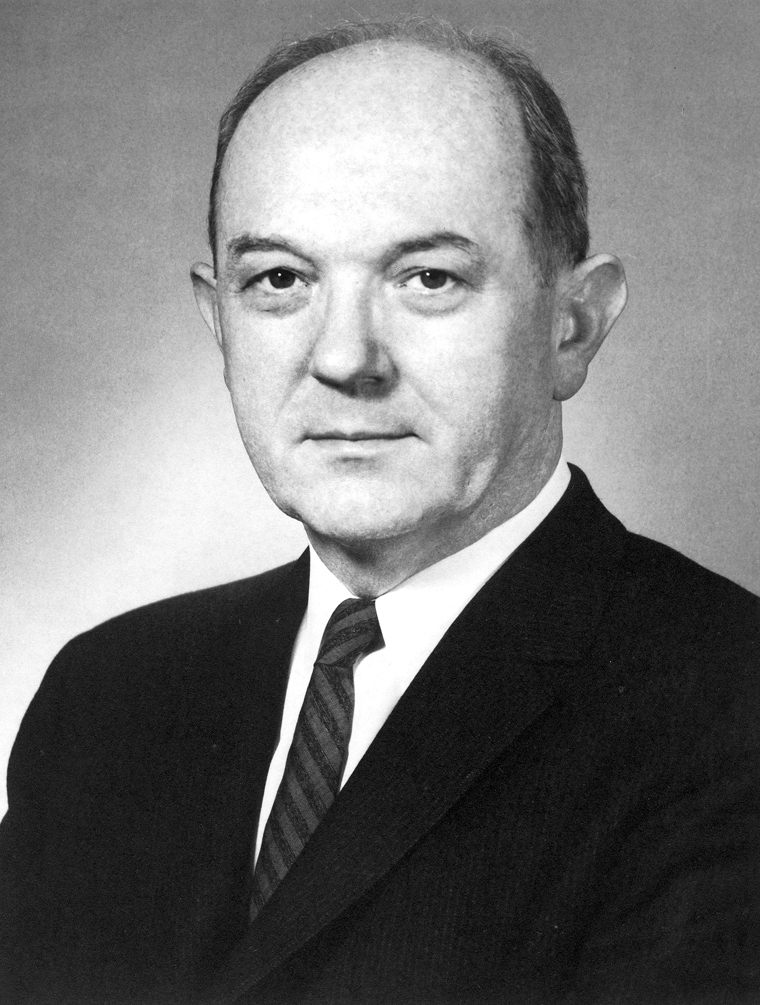
Dean Rusk

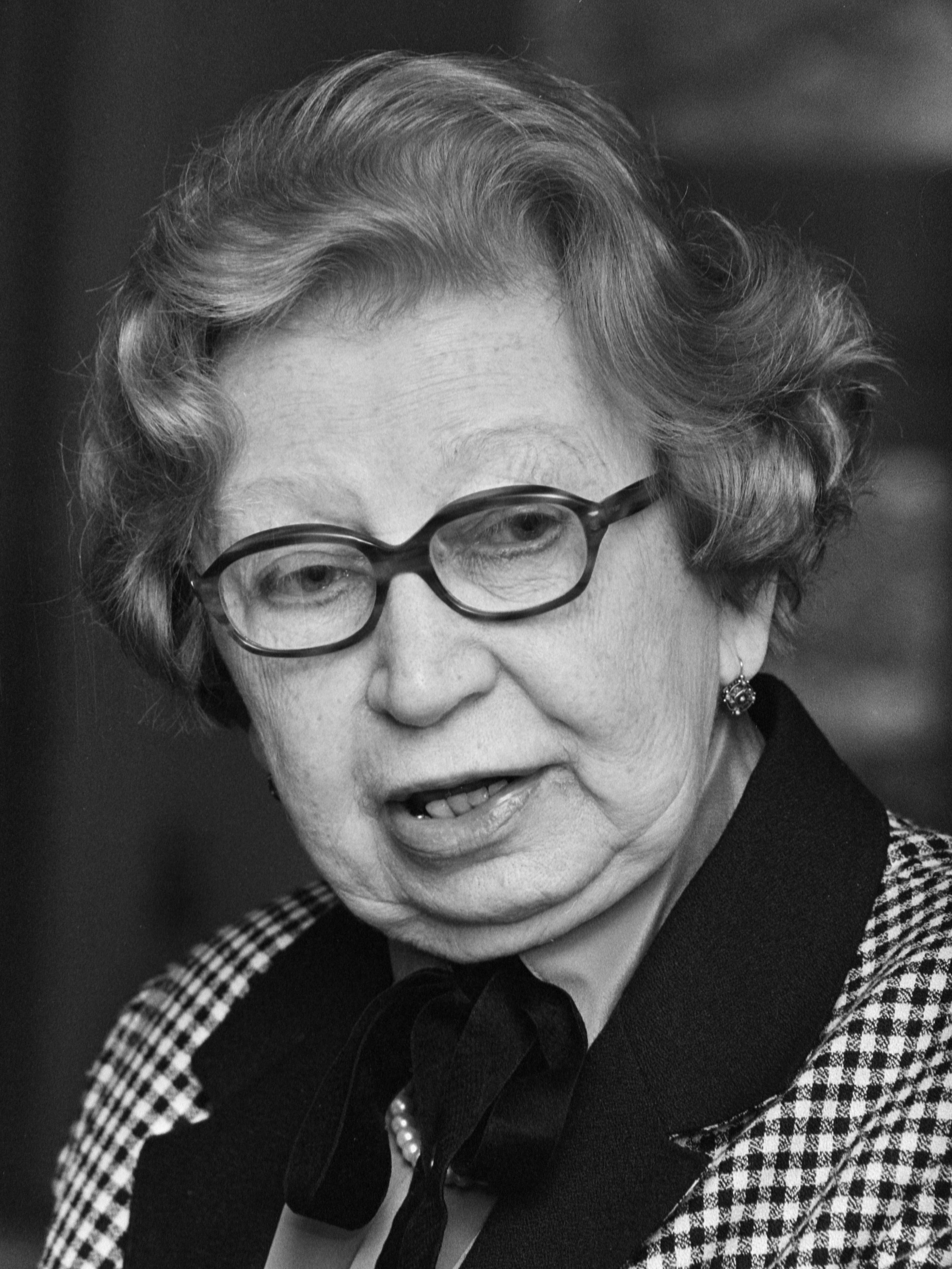
Miep Gies

- February 1 – George Beverly Shea, American gospel singer, songwriter (d. 2013)
- February 3 – Simone Weil, French philosopher (d. 1943)
- February 7 – Amedeo Guillet, Italian army officer (d. 2010)
- February 9
  - Harald Genzmer, German composer (d. 2007)
  - Carmen Miranda, Portuguese-born Brazilian actress, singer (d. 1955)
  - Dean Rusk, American politician (d. 1994)
- February 11
  - Max Baer, American boxer, actor (d. 1959)
  - Joseph L. Mankiewicz, American filmmaker (d. 1993)
- February 12 – Zoran Mušič, Slovene painter (d. 2005)
- February 14 – Yeom Dong-jin, Korean militant (d. c. 1950)
- February 15
  - Miep Gies, Austrian-born Dutch humanitarian (d. 2010)
  - Guillermo Gorostiza Paredes, Spanish footballer (d. 1966)
- February 16
  - Hugh Beaumont, American actor (d. 1982)
  - Jeffrey Lynn, American actor, film producer (d. 1995)
- February 18
  - Matti Järvinen, Finnish javelin thrower (d. 1985)
  - Wallace Stegner, American writer (d. 1993)
- February 19 – Enrico Donati, Italian-born American painter (d. 2008)
- February 20 – Heinz Erhardt, German comedian, musician, entertainer, actor and poet (d. 1979)
- February 21 – Hans Erni, Swiss painter, sculptor (d. 2015)
- February 24 – August Derleth, American writer (d. 1971)
- February 25 – Geoffrey Dummer, English electrical engineer (d. 2002)
- February 26 – King Talal of Jordan (d. 1972)
- February 27 – Andrée Hoppilliard, French aeronautical engineer (d. 1995)
- February 28 – Stephen Spender, English writer (d. 1995)

==== March ====
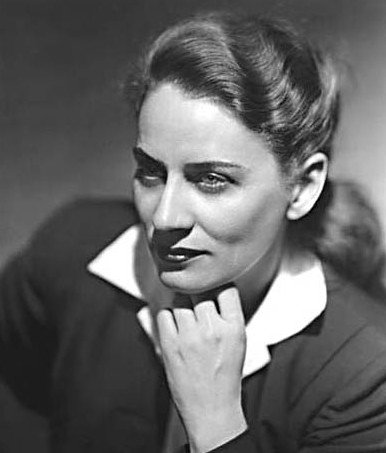
Gabrielle Roy

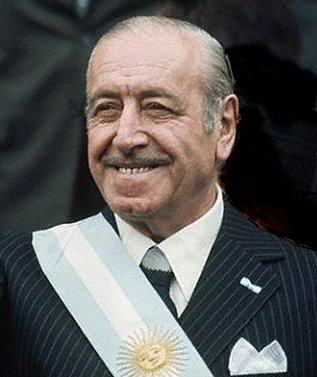
Héctor José Cámpora

- March 7 – Roger Revelle, American scientist, scholar (d. 1991)
- March 11 – Jules Engel, Hungarian-born American filmmaker, painter, sculptor, graphic artist, set designer, animator, film director and teacher (d. 2003)
- March 12 – Virginia McLaurin, American social worker and supercentenarian (d. 2022)
- March 19 – Louis Hayward, South African-born actor (d. 1985)
- March 22 – Gabrielle Roy, Canadian author (d. 1983)
- March 24 – Clyde Barrow, American outlaw, member of Barrow Gang (d. 1934)
- March 26
  - Héctor José Cámpora, Argentine Peronist politician, 38th President of Argentina (d. 1980)
  - Chips Rafferty, Australian actor (d. 1971)
- March 27 – Golo Mann, German historian (d. 1994)
- March 28 – Nelson Algren, American author (d. 1981)

==== April ====
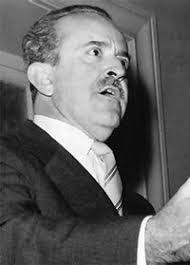
Guillermo León Valencia

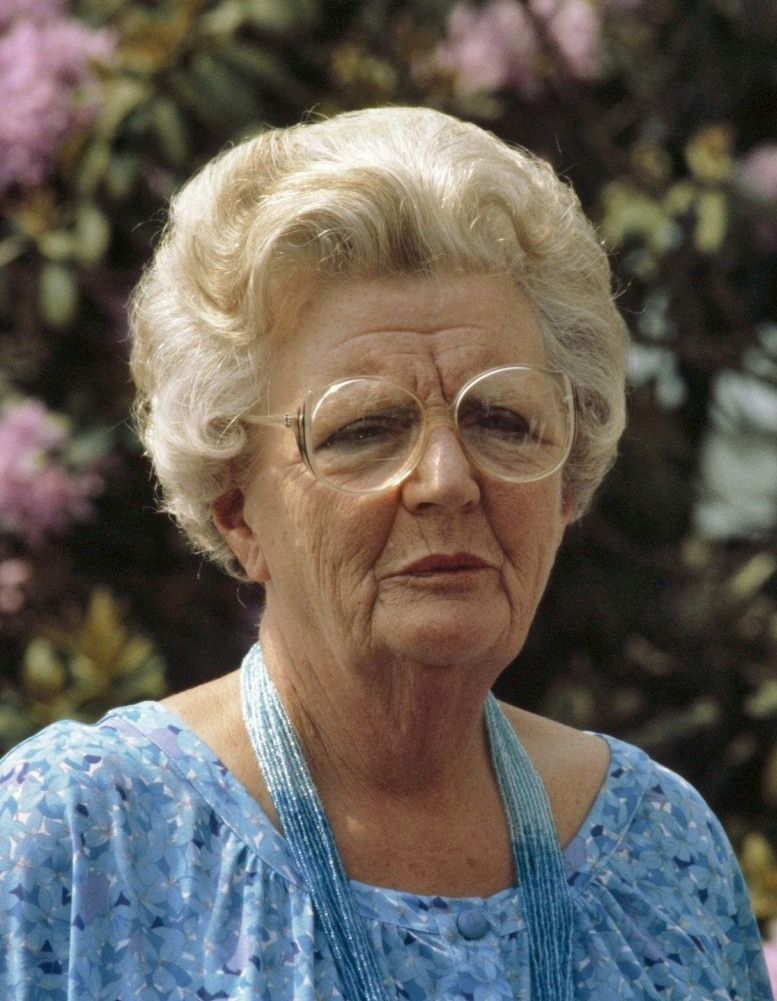
Juliana of the Netherlands

- April 6 – William M. Branham, American Christian minister (d. 1965)
- April 8
  - John Fante, Italian-American writer (d. 1983)
  - John P. Metras, American coach of Canadian football (d. 1982)
- April 13
  - Stanislaw Ulam, Polish-born American mathematician (d. 1984)
  - Eudora Welty, American author (d. 2001)
- April 22
  - Rita Levi-Montalcini, Italian neurologist, Nobel Prize laureate (d. 2012)
  - Spyros Markezinis, Prime Minister of Greece (d. 2000)
  - Indro Montanelli, Italian journalist (d. 2001)
- April 24 – Bernhard Grzimek, German zoo director, zoologist (d. 1987)
- April 26 – Marianne Hoppe, German actress (d. 2002)
- April 27 – Guillermo León Valencia, 21st President of Colombia (d. 1971)
- April 30 – Queen Juliana of the Netherlands (d. 2004)

=== May to August ===
==== May ====
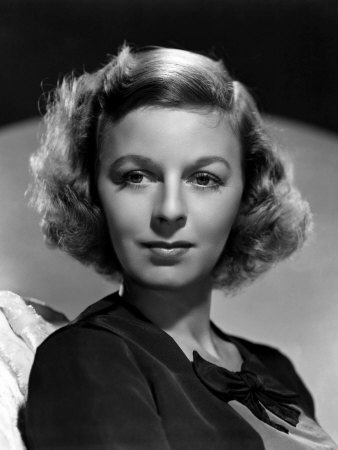
Margaret Sullavan

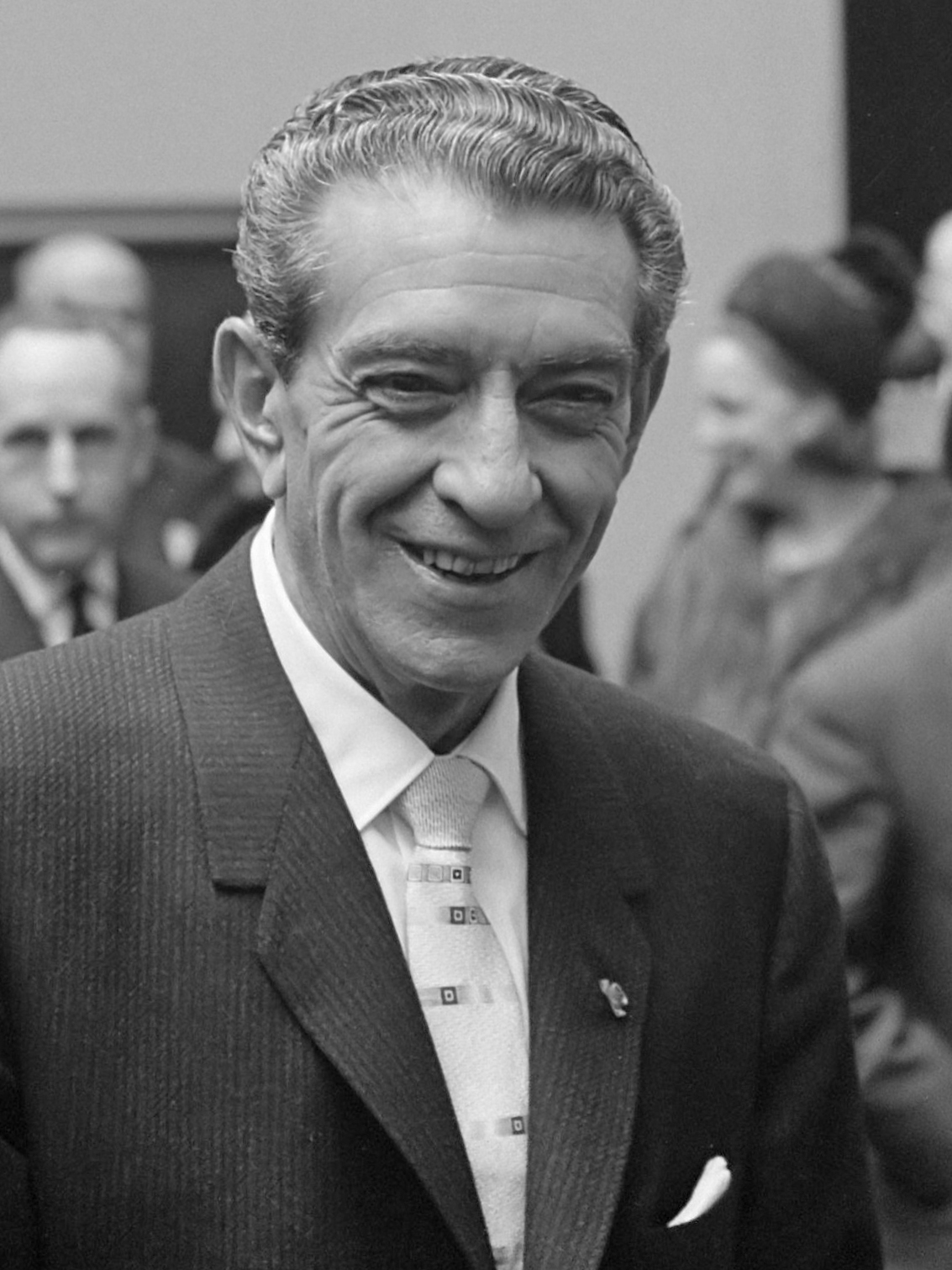
Adolfo López Mateos

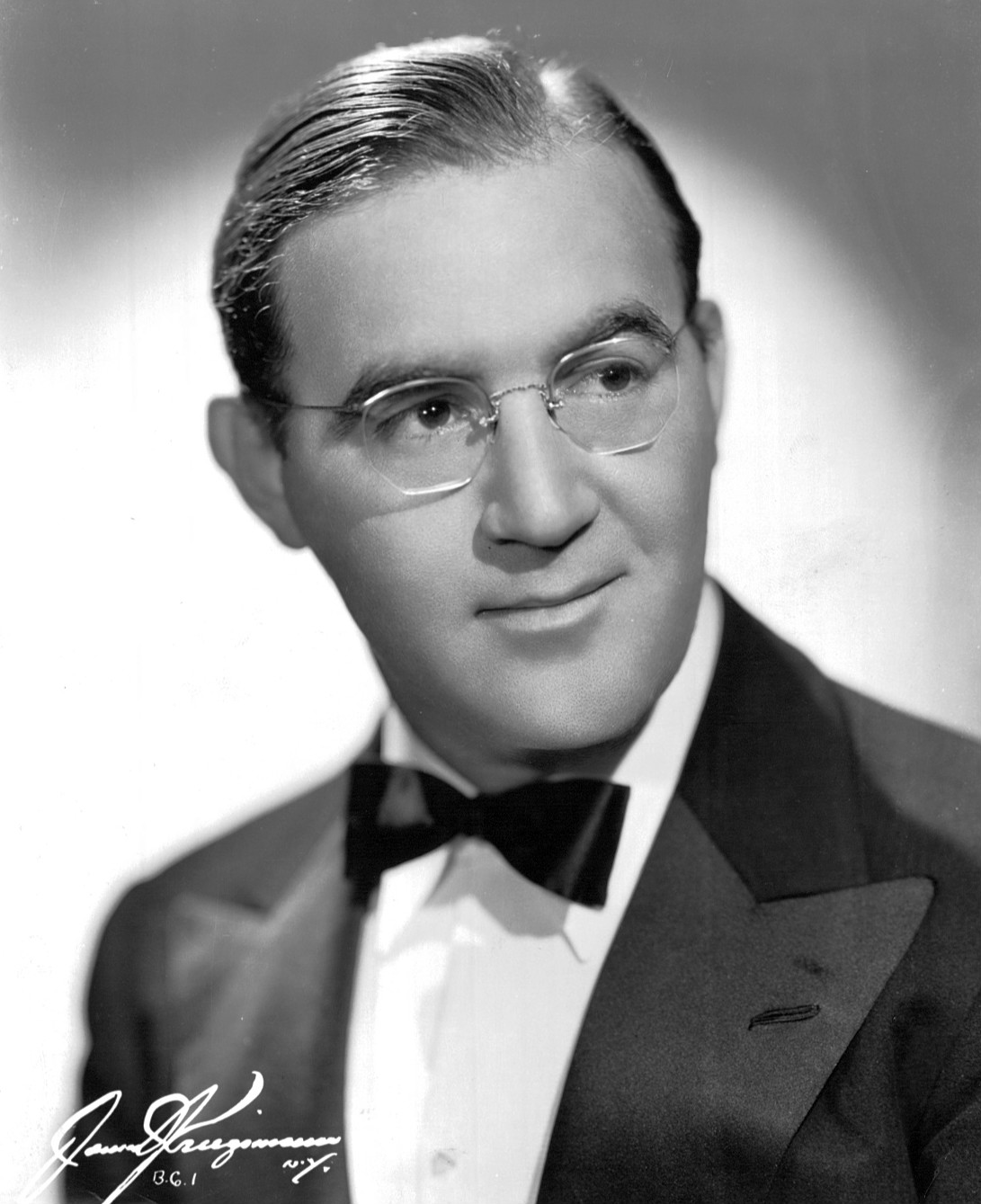
Benny Goodman

- May 1 – Yiannis Ritsos, Greek poet and activist (d. 1990)
- May 4 – Howard Da Silva, American actor (d. 1986)
- May 7 – Edwin H. Land, American camera inventor (d. 1991)
- May 10 – Maybelle Carter, American country musician (d. 1978)
- May 15 – James Mason, British actor (d. 1984)
- May 16 – Margaret Sullavan, American actress (d. 1960)
- May 17 – Karl Schäfer, Austrian figure skater (d. 1976)
- May 18 – Fred Perry, English tennis player (d. 1995)
- May 19 – Nicholas Winton, British humanitarian (d. 2015)
- May 26
  - Matt Busby, Scottish-born football manager (d. 1994)
  - Adolfo López Mateos, 48th President of Mexico (d. 1969)
- May 27
  - Guillermo León Valencia, President of Colombia (d. 1971)
  - Juan Vicente Pérez, Venezuelan farmer and supercentenarian, last surviving man born in the 1900s decade (d. 2024)
- May 30 – Benny Goodman, American swing clarinetist and bandleader (d. 1986)

==== June ====
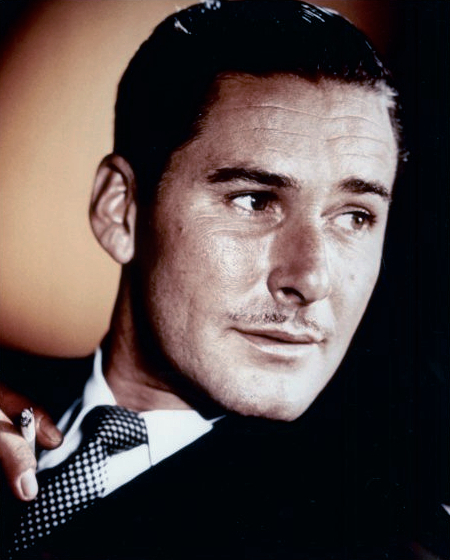
Errol Flynn

- June 6 – Isaiah Berlin, Russian-born British historian of ideas (d. 1997)
- June 7 – Jessica Tandy, English actress (d. 1994)
- June 14 – Burl Ives, American folk singer (d. 1995)
- June 19 – Osamu Dazai, Japanese novelist (d. 1948)
- June 20 – Errol Flynn, Australian-born American actor (d. 1959)
- June 22
  - Infanta Beatriz of Spain (d. 2002)
  - Katherine Dunham, American dancer, choreographer, and songwriter (d. 2006)
- June 23 – Li Xiannian, President of the People's Republic of China (d. 1992)
- June 24 – William Penney, Baron Penney, English mathematician, physicist (d. 1991)
- June 26
  - Colonel Tom Parker, Dutch-born celebrity manager (d. 1997)
  - Wolfgang Reitherman, German-born American animator, director and producer (d. 1985)
- June 28 – Eric Ambler, British author (d. 1998)
- June 30 – Juan Bosch, 43rd President of the Dominican Republic (d. 2001)

==== July ====
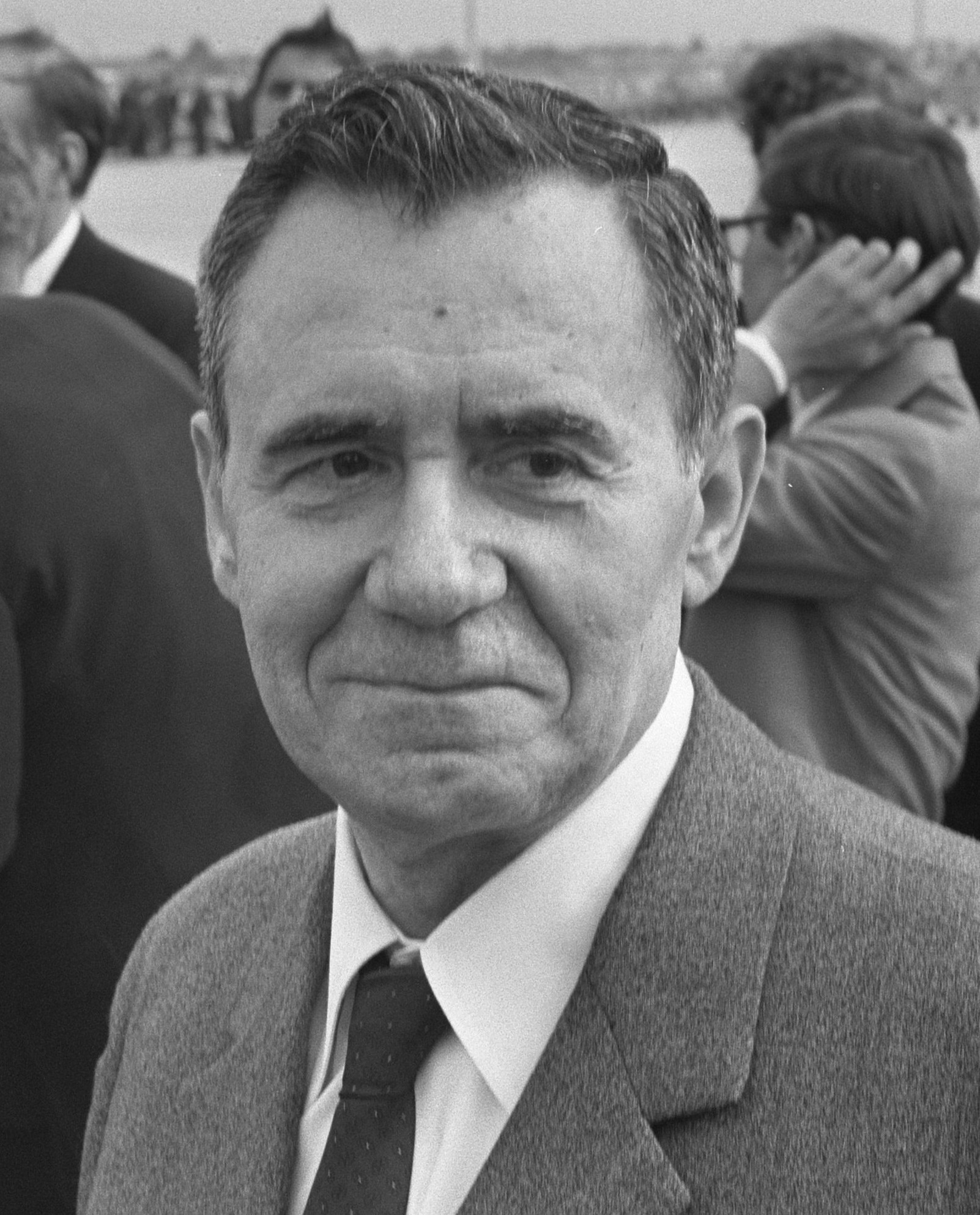
Andrei Gromyko

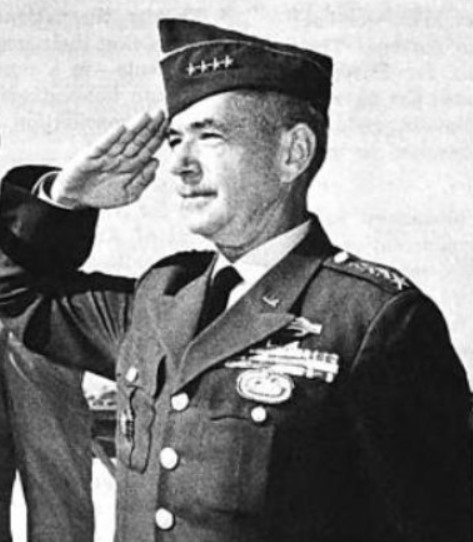
Theodore J. Conway

- July 5 – Douglas Dodds-Parker, British politician and administrator (d. 2006)
- July 6 – Eric Reece, 32nd Premier of Tasmania (d. 1999)
- July 7
  - Billy Herman, American baseball player and manager (d. 1992)
  - Gottfried von Cramm, German tennis player (d. 1976)
- July 9 – Pavle Đurišić, Montenegrin Serb army commander (d. 1945)
- July 11 – Irene Hervey, American actress (d. 1998)
- July 12 – Motoichi Kumagai, Japanese photographer, illustrator (d. 2010)
- July 13 – Souphanouvong, 1st President of Laos (d. 1995)
- July 14 – Alejandro Morera, Costa Rican footballer (d. 1995)
- July 15 – Hendrik Casimir, Dutch physicist (d. 2000)
- July 16 – Aruna Asaf Ali, Indian independence activist (d. 1996)
- July 18
  - Andrei Gromyko, Soviet Minister for Foreign Affairs (d. 1989)
  - Mohammed Daoud Khan, 5th Prime Minister of Afghanistan and 1st President of Afghanistan (d. 1978)
- July 19 – Balamani Amma, Indian poet (d. 2004)
- July 22 – Licia Albanese, Italian-born American operatic soprano (d. 2014)
- July 24
  - Theodore J. Conway, American four-star general, commander STRICOM (d. 1990)
  - John William Finn, American WWII hero (d. 2010)
- July 26 – Vivian Vance, American actress (d. 1979)
- July 28 – Malcolm Lowry, English novelist (Under the Volcano) (d. 1957)
- July 30 – C. Northcote Parkinson, British historian, author (d. 1993)
- July 31 – Olivér Halassy, Hungarian water polo player and freestyle swimmer (d. 1946)

==== August ====
- August 8
  - Charles Lyttelton, 10th Viscount Cobham, English cricketer, politician and 9th Governor-General of New Zealand (d. 1977)
  - Jack Renshaw, Australian politician, Premier of New South Wales (d. 1987)
- August 9 – Adam von Trott zu Solz, German lawyer, diplomat, anti-Nazi (k. 1944)
- August 10 – Leo Fender, American guitar inventor, manufacturer (d. 1991)
- August 13 – Brian Lawrance, Australian bandleader (d. 1983)
- August 18 – Gordon Gunter, American marine biologist, fisheries scientist (d. 1998)
- August 21 – Ethel Caterham, English supercentenarian, oldest living person, last surviving person born in 1909, last surviving subject of King Edward VII
- August 25 – Michael Rennie, English actor (d. 1971)
- August 26 – Jim Davis, American actor (d. 1981)

=== September to December ===
==== September ====
Elia Kazan

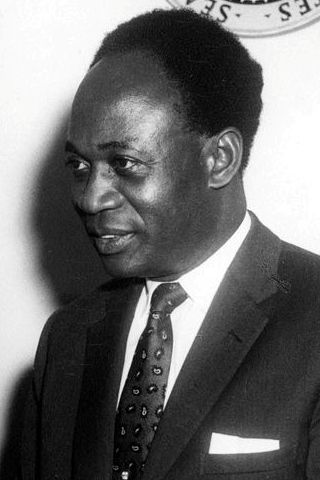
Kwame Nkrumah

- September 1 – E. Herbert Norman, Canadian diplomat (d. 1957)
- September 7 – Elia Kazan, Turkish-born American film director (d. 2003)
- September 14 – Peter Scott, British ornithologist and painter (d. 1989)
- September 15
  - Jean Batten, New Zealand aviator (d. 1982)
  - Jan van Aartsen, Dutch politician (d. 1992)
- September 19 – Ferry Porsche, Austrian auto designer, businessman (d. 1998)
- September 21 – Kwame Nkrumah, Ghanaian politician, 1st president of Ghana (d. 1972)
- September 28 – Al Capp, American cartoonist (d. 1979)

==== October ====
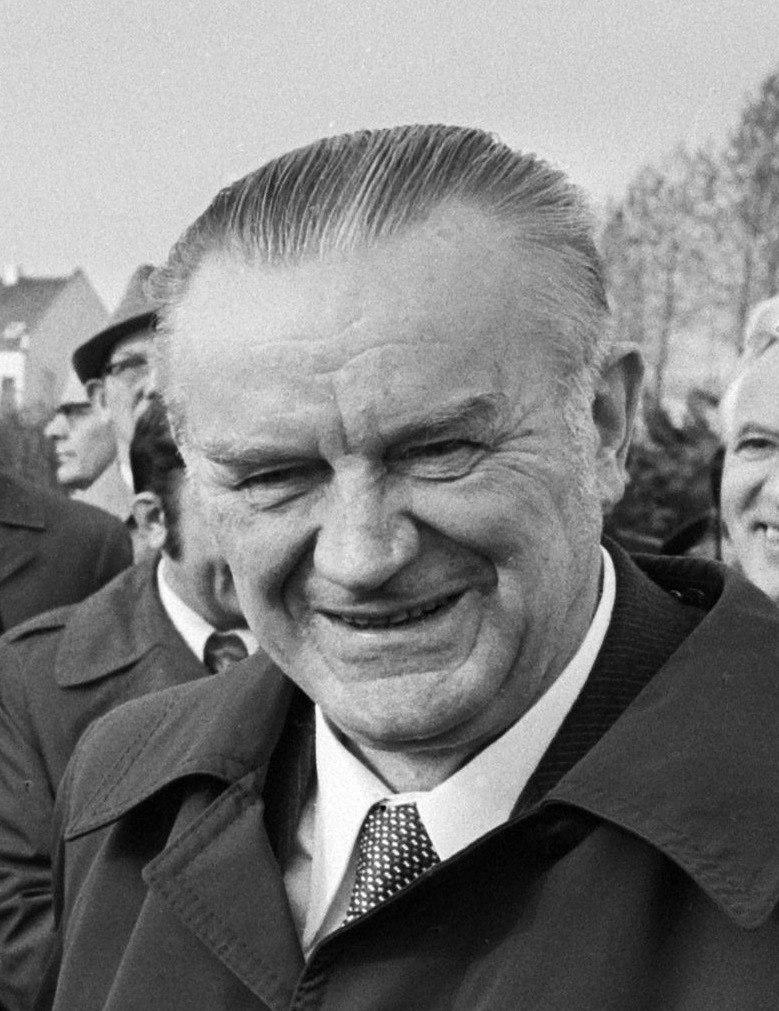
Piotr Jaroszewicz

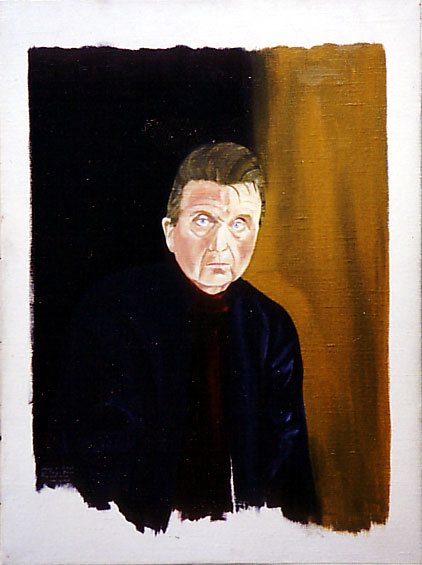
Francis Bacon

- October 1 – Everett Sloane, American actor (d. 1965)
- October 4 – Murray Chotiner, American political consultant (d. 1974)
- October 8 – Piotr Jaroszewicz, Polish politician, 49th Prime Minister of Poland (d. 1992)
- October 10 – Robert F. Boyle, American production designer, art director (d. 2010)
- October 13 – Herblock, American editorial cartoonist (d. 2001)
- October 14 – Bernd Rosemeyer, German race car driver (d. 1938)
- October 18 – Norberto Bobbio, Italian philosopher of law and political sciences (d. 2004)
- October 19 – Marguerite Perey, French physicist, 1939 discovered element Francium (d. 1975)
- October 24 – Bill Carr, American track and field athlete (d. 1966)
- October 25 – Whit Bissell, American actor (d. 1996)
- October 28 – Francis Bacon, Irish-born British painter (d. 1992)

==== November ====
- November 9 – Kay Thompson, American author, actress (d. 1998)
- November 10 – Paweł Jasienica, Polish historian (d. 1970)
- November 16 – Mirza Nasir Ahmad, Indian Islamic leader (d. 1982)
- November 18 – Johnny Mercer, American songwriter (d. 1976)
- November 23 – Nigel Tranter, Scottish historian and novelist (d. 2000)
- November 24 – Gerhard Gentzen, German mathematician (d. 1945)
- November 26 – Eugène Ionesco, Romanian-born French playwright (d. 1994)
- November 27 – James Agee, American writer (d. 1955)

==== December ====
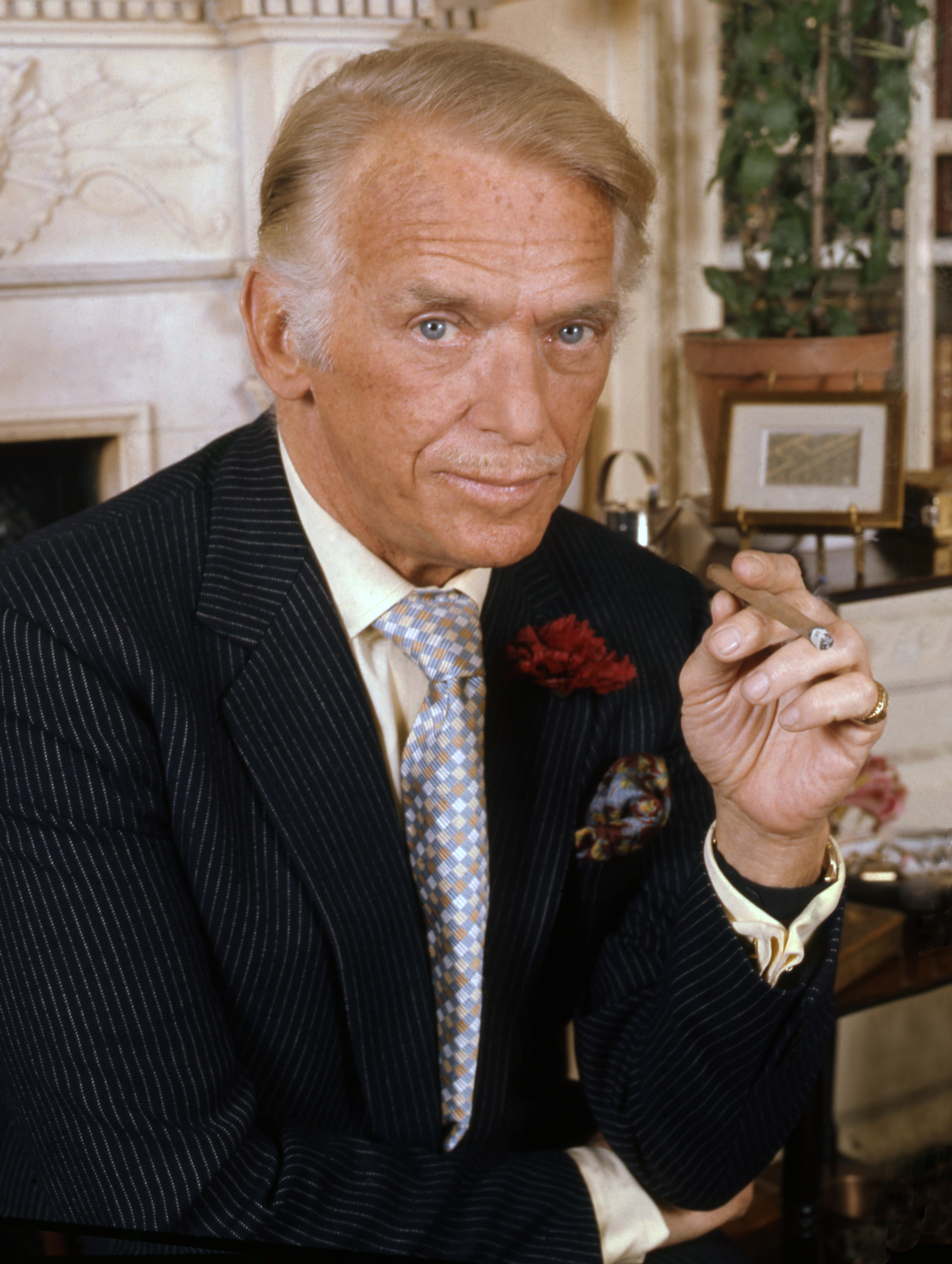
Douglas Fairbanks Jr.

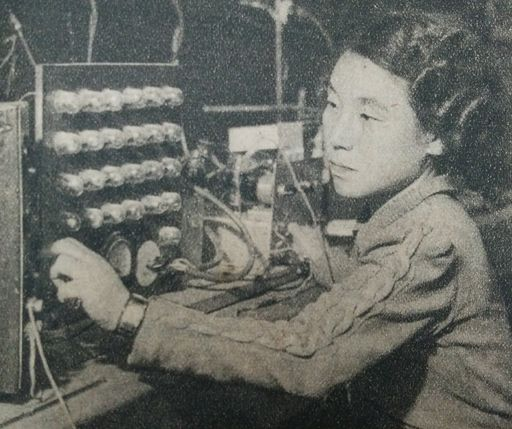
Yuasa Toshiko

- December 2 – Marion Dönhoff, German journalist (d. 2002)
- December 5 – Bobbie Heine Miller, South African tennis player (d. 2016)
- December 7 – Arch Oboler, American actor, playwright, screenwriter, novelist, producer and director (d. 1987)
- December 9 – Douglas Fairbanks Jr., American actor and naval officer (d. 2000)
- December 11 – Yuasa Toshiko, Japanese nuclear physicist who worked in France, the first Japanese female physicist (d. 1980)
- December 14 – Edward Tatum, American geneticist, Nobel Prize laureate (d. 1975)
- December 20 – Vagn Holmboe, Danish composer (d. 1996)
- December 21 – Seichō Matsumoto, Japanese writer, journalist (d. 1992)
- December 22 – Patricia Hayes, British character actress, comedian (d. 1998)
- December 27 – Henryk Jabłoński, President of Poland (d. 2003)

== Deaths ==
=== January ===
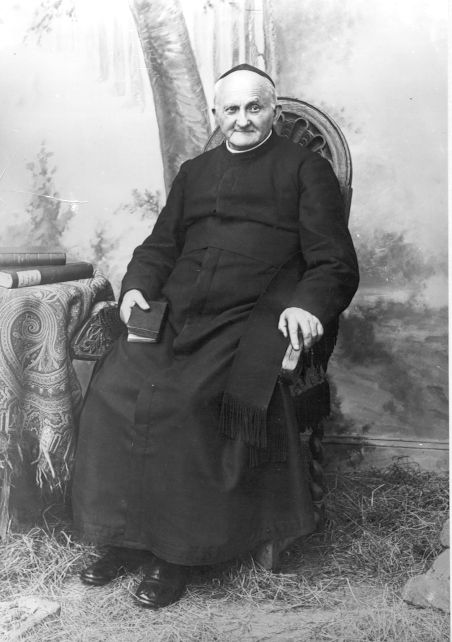
Saint Arnold Janssen

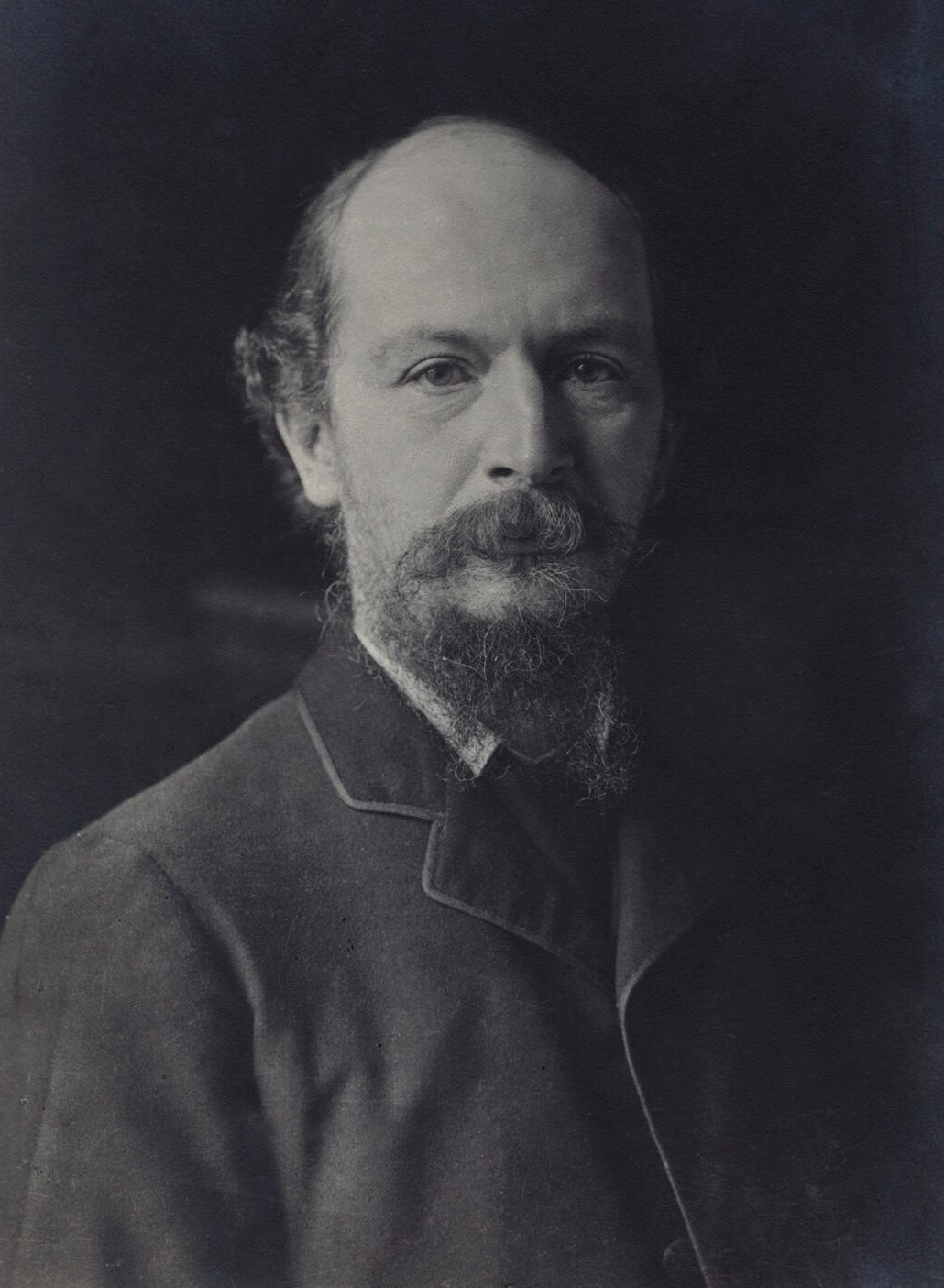
A. C. Swinburne

- January 1 – Mollie Evelyn Moore Davis, American poet, writer and editor (b. 1844)
- January 2 – Marta Abreu, Cuban philanthropist (b. 1845)
- January 6 – George Dixon, Canadian-born American boxer (b. 1870)
- January 8 – Harry Seeley, British palaeontologist (b. 1839)
- January 10
  - Julia Colman, American temperance educator, activist, editor and writer (b. 1828)
  - Charles Vernon Culver, American politician (b. 1830)
- January 11 – Joseph Wharton, American industrialist and educationist. (b. 1826)
- January 12 – Hermann Minkowski, German mathematician (b. 1864)
- January 14
  - Arthur William à Beckett, British journalist (b. 1844)
  - Zinovy Rozhestvensky, Russian admiral (b. 1848)
- January 15 – Arnold Janssen, German Roman Catholic priest and saint (b. 1837)
- January 22 – Hattie Tyng Griswold, American author (b. 1842)
- January 24 – Petre S. Aurelian, 19th Prime Minister of Romania (b. 1833)
- January 29 – Felice Beato, Italian British photographer (b. 1832)
- January 30 – Martha Finley, American teacher, author (b. 1828)

=== February ===
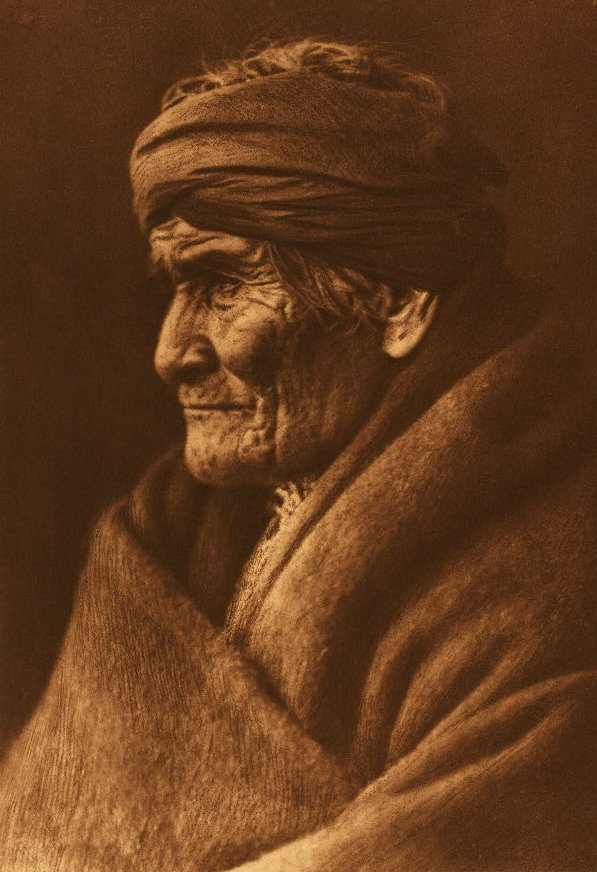
Geronimo

- February 5 – Alexandre Saint-Yves d'Alveydre, French occultist (b. 1842)
- February 8 – Catulle Mendès, French poet (b. 1841)
- February 13 – Hans Peter Jørgen Julius Thomsen, Danish chemist (b. 1826)
- February 17
  - Geronimo, Apache leader (b. 1829)
  - Grand Duke Vladimir Alexandrovich of Russia, Russian army officer and nobleman (b. 1847)
- February 20 – Paul Ranson, French painter (b. 1864)
- February 26
  - Caran d'Ache, French political cartoonist (b. 1858)
  - Hermann Ebbinghaus, German psychologist (b. 1850)

=== March ===
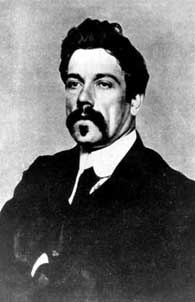
John Millington Synge

- March 6 – Gustaf af Geijerstam, Swedish novelist (b. 1858)
- March 13 – William Jackson Palmer, American founder of Colorado Springs (b. 1836)
- March 16 – Wilbraham Egerton, 1st Earl Egerton, chairman of the Manchester Ship Canal (b. 1832)
- March 24 – John Millington Synge, Irish playwright (b. 1871)
- March 25 – Ruperto Chapí, Spanish composer (b. 1854)

=== April ===
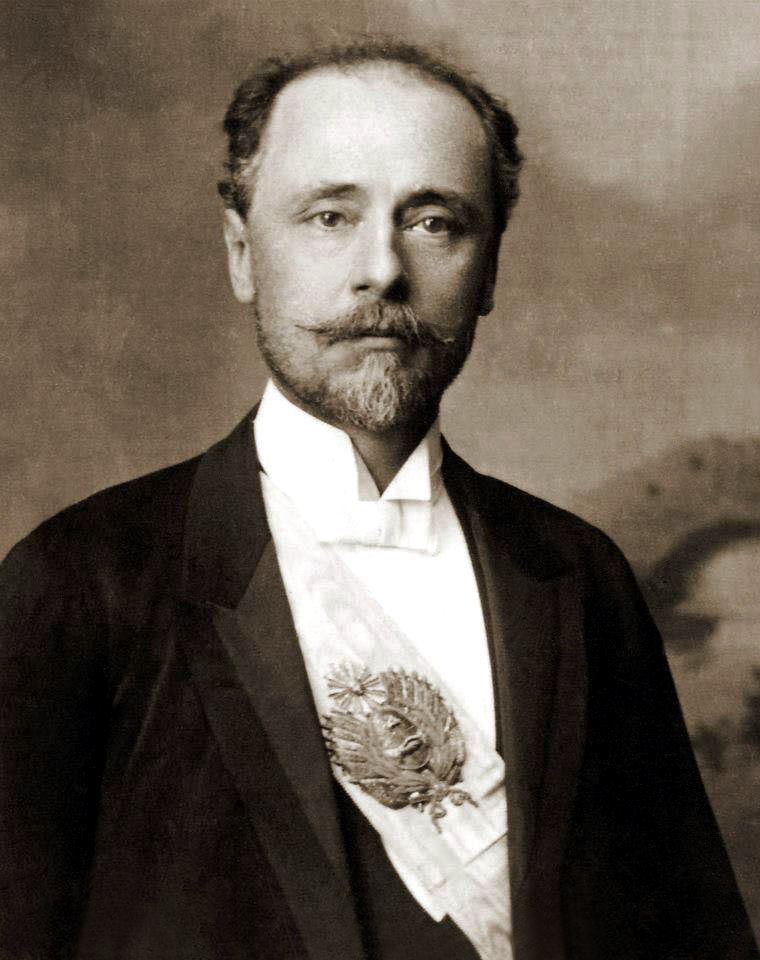
Miguel Angel Juarez Celman

- April 1 – Sir Marshal Clarke, British colonial administrator (b. 1841)
- April 3 – Pascual Cervera y Topete, Spanish admiral (b. 1839)
- April 8 – Helena Modjeska, Polish actress (b. 1840)
- April 10 – Algernon Charles Swinburne, English poet (b. 1837)
- April 13 – Sir Donald Currie, British shipping magnate (b. 1825)
- April 14 – Miguel Ángel Juárez Celman, 10th President of Argentina (b. 1844)
- April 19 – Signe Rink, Greenland-born Danish writer, ethnologist (b. 1836)
- April 28 – Frederick Holbrook, Vermont governor (b. 1813)

=== May ===
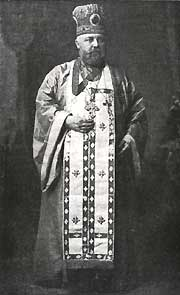
Saint Alexis Toth

- May 2 – Manuel Amador Guerrero, 1st President of Panama (b. 1833)
- May 4 – Helen Marr Hurd, American teacher and poet (b. 1839)
- May 7 – Alexis Toth, Russian Orthodox church leader and saint (b. 1853)
- May 9 – Augusta Jane Evans, American author of Southern literature (b. 1835)
- May 10 – Futabatei Shimei, Japanese author, translator (b. 1864)
- May 12
  - Sir Hugh Gough, British general, Victoria Cross recipient (b. 1833)
  - Bertha Townsend, American tennis champion (b. 1869)
- May 17 – Helge Alexander Haugan, American banking executive (b. 1847)
- May 18
  - Isaac Albéniz, Spanish composer (b. 1860)
  - George Meredith, English novelist, poet (b. 1828)
- May 20 – Ernest Hogan, African-American dancer, musician and comedian (b. 1865)

=== June ===
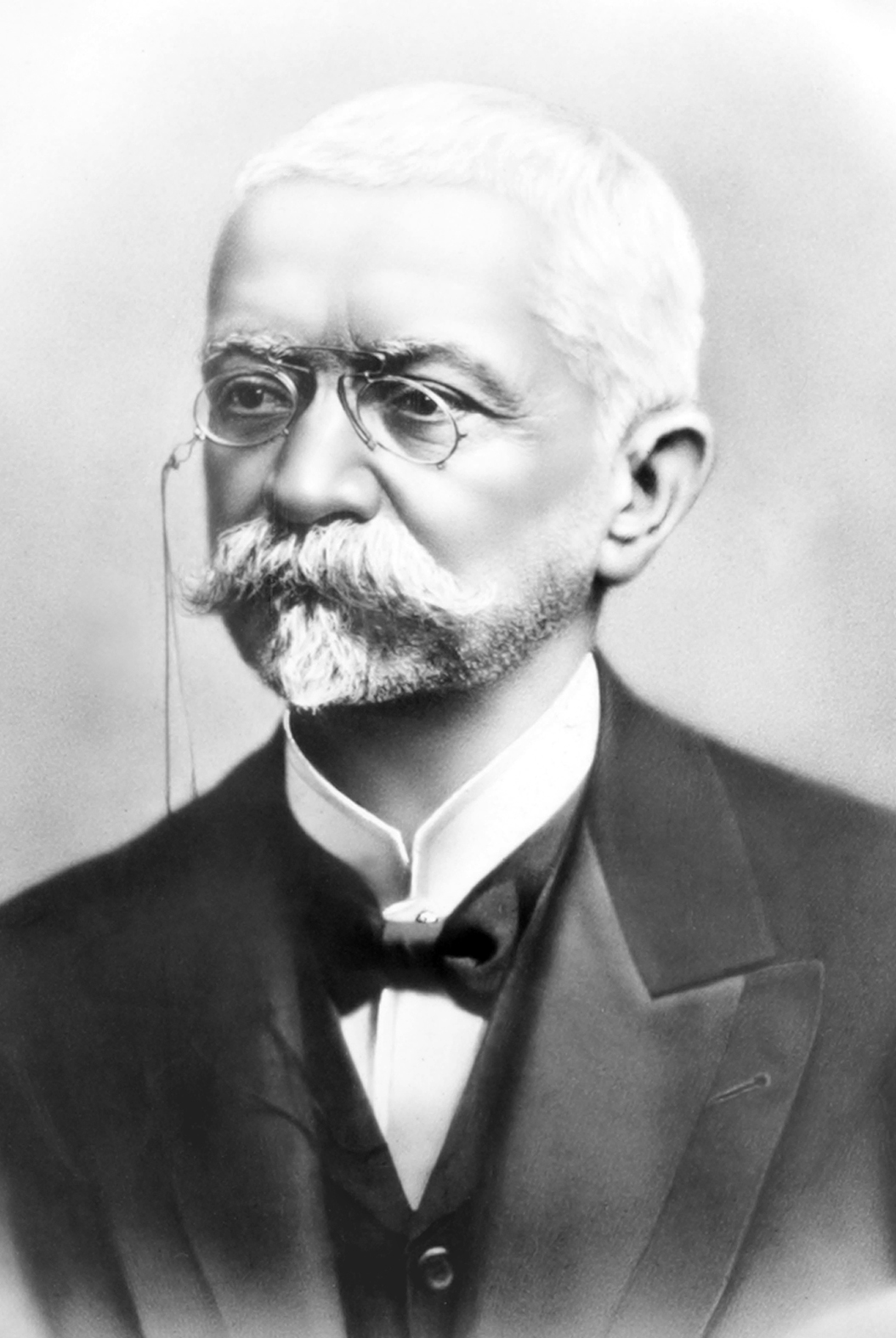
Afonso Pena

- June 10
  - Edward Everett Hale, American author and historian (b. 1822)
  - Gideon T. Stewart, American educator, politician (b. 1824)
- June 14 – Afonso Pena, 6th President of Brazil (b. 1847)
- June 24 – Sarah Orne Jewett, American writer (b. 1849)

=== July ===
- July 8 – Gaston, Marquis de Galliffet, French general (b. 1830)
- July 9 – Kasimir Felix Graf von Badeni, 13th Minister-President of Cisleithania (b. 1846)
- July 11 – Simon Newcomb, Canadian-American astronomer, mathematician (b. 1835)
- July 18 – Carlos, Duke of Madrid (b. 1848)
- July 19 – Arai Ikunosuke, Japanese samurai (b. 1836)
- July 20 – Johanna Mestorf, German archaeologist (b. 1828)
- July 22 – Detlev von Liliencron, German poet (b. 1844)
- July 23 – Sir Frederick Holder, 19th Premier of South Australia (b. 1850)

=== August ===
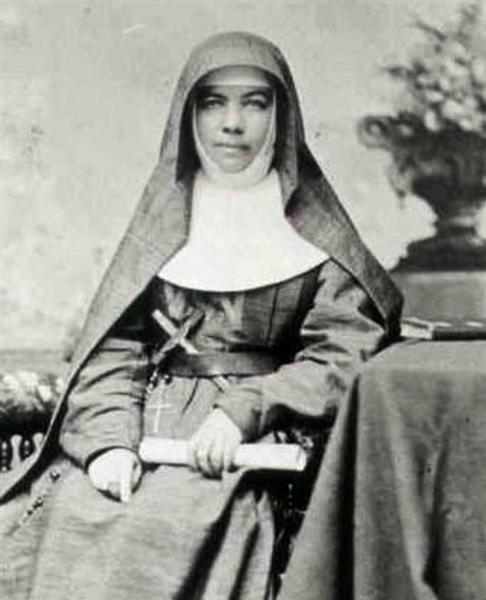
Saint Mary MacKillop

- August 5 – Miguel Antonio Caro, Colombian political leader (b. 1843)
- August 8 – Mary MacKillop, Australian Roman Catholic nun and saint (b. 1842)
- August 14 – William Stanley, British inventor, engineer (b. 1829)
- August 15 – Euclides da Cunha, Brazilian author (b. 1866)
- August 22 – Henry Radcliffe Crocker, English dermatologist (b. 1846)
- August 25 – Besarion Jughashvili, Georgian cobbler, father of Joseph Stalin (b. 1850)
- August 27 – Emil Christian Hansen, Danish fermentation physiologist (b. 1842)

=== September ===
- September 2 – Louis Delacenserie, Belgian architect (b. 1838)
- September 4 – Clyde Fitch, American dramatist (b. 1865)
- September 5 – Louis Bouveault, French chemist (b. 1864)
- September 7 – Eugène Lefebvre, pioneer French aviator (b. 1878)
- September 18 – Grigore Tocilescu, Romanian historian, archaeologist, epigrapher and folklorist (b. 1850)
- September 22 – Ferdinand Ferber, French Army officer, pioneer aviator (b. 1862)
- September 27 – Gyula Donáth, Hungarian sculptor (b. 1850)
- September 29 – Vladimir Vidrić, Croatian poet (b. 1875)

=== October ===
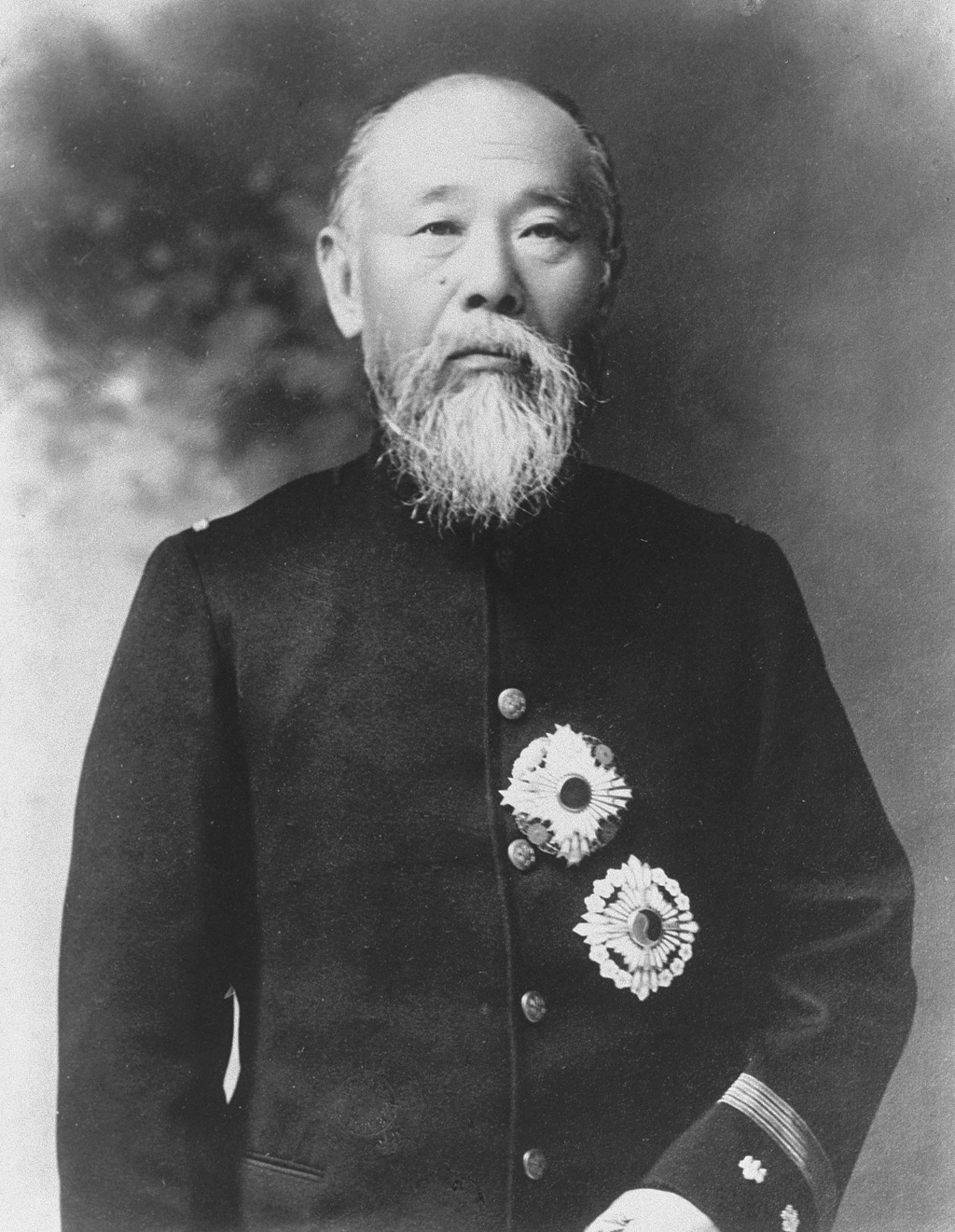
Ito Hirobumi

- October 7 – William Thomas Pipes, Canadian politician, 6th Premier of Nova Scotia (b. 1850)
- October 9 – Heinrich Gudehus, German tenor (b. 1842)
- October 13 – Francisco Ferrer, Spanish anarchist (executed) (b. 1859)
- October 17 – Sagen Ishizuka, Japanese physician and dietitian (b. 1850)
- October 19 – Cesare Lombroso, Italian criminologist, physician (b. 1835)
- October 24 – Rufus W. Peckham, Associate Justice of the Supreme Court of the United States (b. 1838)
- October 26 – Itō Hirobumi, 1st Prime Minister of Japan (assassinated) (b. 1841)
- October – George Smart (skater), English Fen skater (industrial accident)

=== November ===
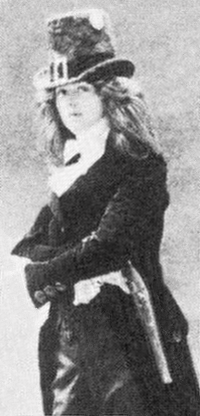
Renée Vivien

- November 9 – William Powell Frith, English painter (b. 1819)
- November 14 – Joshua Slocum, Canadian-born American seaman and adventurer (b. 1844)
- November 18 – Renée Vivien, British-born American poet (b. 1877)

=== December ===
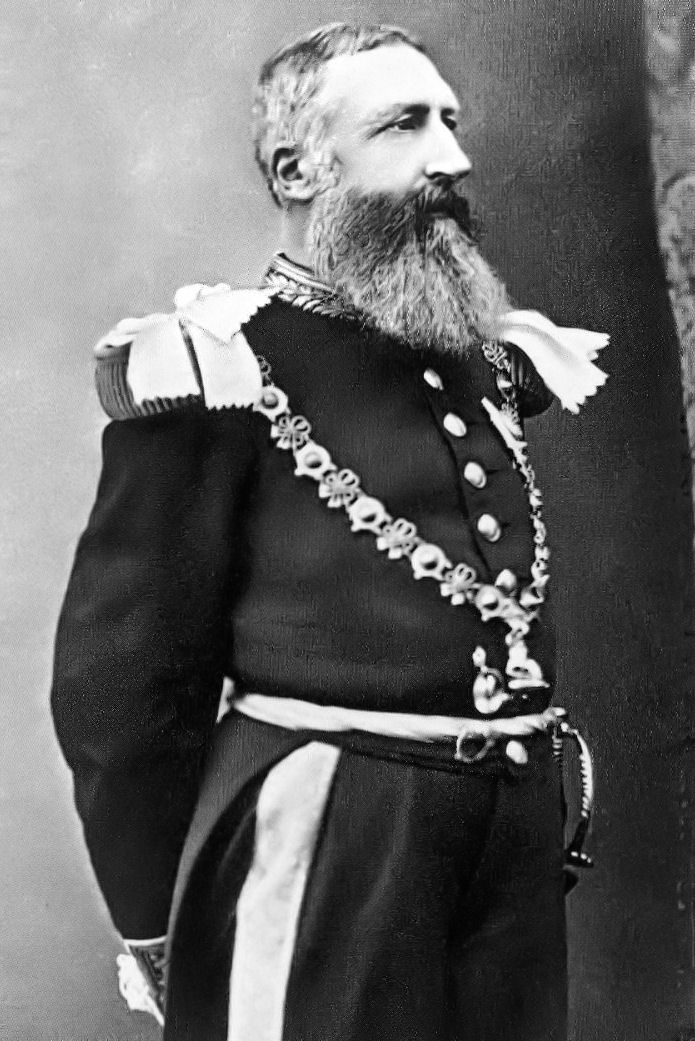
King Leopold II of Belgium

- December 10 – Red Cloud, Sioux warrior (b. 1822)
- December 14 – Agustí Querol Subirats, Spanish sculptor (b. 1860)
- December 15 – Francisco Tárrega, Spanish guitarist, composer (b. 1852)
- December 17 – King Leopold II of Belgium (b. 1835)
- December 16
  - Adelaide of Löwenstein-Wertheim-Rosenberg, Queen consort of Portugal (b. 1831)
  - Lina Morgenstern, German writer, educator, feminist and pacifist (b. 1830)
- December 18 – Grand Duke Michael Nikolaevich, Russian royal (b. 1832)
- December 26 – Frederic Remington, American cowboy artist, sculptor (b. 1864)

=== Date unknown ===
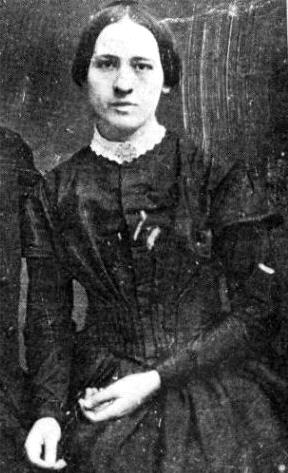
Martha Foster Crawford

- Martha Foster Crawford, American writer and missionary in China (b. 1830)

== Nobel Prizes ==

- Physics – Guglielmo Marconi and Karl Ferdinand Braun
- Chemistry – Wilhelm Ostwald
- Medicine – Emil Theodor Kocher
- Literature – Selma Lagerlöf
- Peace – Auguste Marie François Beernaert and Paul-Henri-Benjamin d'Estournelles de Constant

== Primary sources and year books ==
- New International year book: 1909
