= Hemmo Kallio =

Finnish actor and playwright

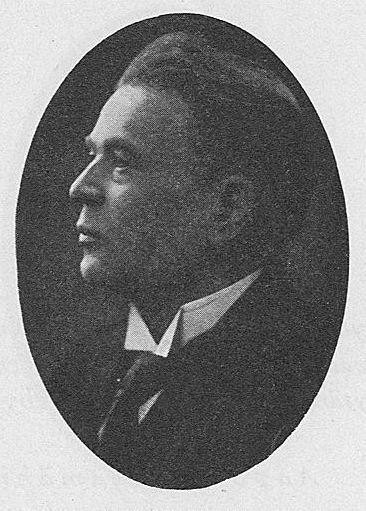
- Born: Herman Puttonen; 19 April 1863; Rural Municipality of Jyväskylä, Grand Duchy of Finland, Russian Empire
- Died: 8 September 1940 (aged 77); Helsinki, Finland
- Occupations: Actor, playwright
- Years active: 1882–1936

Herman "Hemmo" Kallio (born Herman Puttonen; 19 April 1863 – 8 September 1940) was a Finnish stage and film actor and playwright.

== Career ==
Born Herman Puttonen, he officially changed his surname to Kallio in 1906. Herman began his professional career as a print shop director. He began his acting career in 1882 at the Helsinki Arkadia theater, then moved to the Finnish Theatre (now, the Finnish National Theatre), where he was engaged until he retired from the stage in the late 1930s. His long stint at the theater included a repertoire of over four hundred roles.

From the 1920s Kallio began appearing in roles in Finnish films, often cast in fatherly roles. The first of which was the 1920 Teuvo Puro-directed drama Ollin oppivuodet. One of his most popular film roles was that of Anna-Liisa's father in the 1922 Teuvo Puro and Jussi Snellman-directed silent film drama Anna-Liisa, based on the eponymously titled 1895 play by Finnish writer Minna Canth. Most of his silent film roles of the 1920s are now lost.

Hemmo Kallio died in Helsinki in 1940. He is the grandfather of Finnish actor Ismo Kallio.

== Filmography ==
Year	Title	Role	Notes
1920	Ollin oppivuodet	suutari Jokela	
1921	Se parhaiten nauraa, joka viimeksi nauraa	sahanomistaja Kustaa Penttilä, Martin eno	
1922	Anna-Liisa	Kortesuon isäntä	
1927	Noidan kirot	Esa	
1927	Vaihdokas	Haukka	
1931	Rovastin häämatkat	Benjamin Jaakkola	
1931	Tukkipojan morsian	Kustaa Koski	
1934	Meidän poikamme ilmassa - me maassa	Erkin isä	
1935	Roinilan talossa	Meri-Matti	
1936	Pohjalaisia	Herastuomari	(final film role)
