= Anna-Liisa (1922 film) =

1922 film

- Directed by: Teuvo Puro; Jussi Snellman
- Screenplay by: Jussi Snellman
- Based on: Anna Liisa by Minna Canth
- Produced by: Erkki Karu
- Starring: See below
- Cinematography: Armas Fredman; Kurt Jäger; A. J. Tenhovaara
- Edited by: Kurt Jäger; Teuvo Puro
- Production company: Suomi-Filmi
- Release date: 20 March 1922
- Running time: 88 minutes
- Country: Finland
- Languages: Silent film; Finnish and Swedish intertitles

Anna-Liisa is a 1922 Finnish silent film directed by Teuvo Puro and Jussi Snellman based on the eponymous play by Finnish writer Minna Canth.

== Plot ==
Anna-Liisa (1922)

Rural Finland at the end of the 19th century: 19-year-old Anna-Liisa, daughter of farmer Kortesuo, is preparing her wedding to Johannes Kivimaa.

A few days before the official announcement of the wedding, she receives the visit of Husso, the mother of Mikko who was a farmhand at the Kortesuo farm. She tells her that Mikko, who now owns a log-floating firm, is coming back and wants to marry her. When Anna-Liisa refuses, Husso reminds her how four years earlier she had helped her hide the body of the baby born from her relationship with Mikko, whom she had accidentally killed.

Mikko, supported by Husso, threatens Anna-Liisa to reveal her secret if she refuses to marry him. When Johannes demands that he stops bothering Anna-Liisa, he threatens to kill him. The arrival of Anna-Liisa parents put an end to the fight but when Anna-Liisa repeats that she will never marry Mikko, Husso reveals to her shocked parents what happened four years ago. Anna-Liisa confesses everything. Her father, beside himself with rage and disappointment, initially wants to kill her, but soon calms down.

The following day, Anna-Liisa tries to drown herself to join her dead baby but she is saved by Johannes. After praying God, she knows what she must do. She says she forgives everybody including Mikko and accepts to marry him.

On the wedding day, she appears dressed entirely in black. She confesses to the whole assembly what she has done and declares she is ready to receive the punishment she deserves. After taking leave of her family and of Johannes, she is carried away by the police.

== Cast ==
- Helmi Lindelöf as Anna-Liisa Kortesuo
- Hemmo Kallio as Anna-Liisa's father
- Meri Roini as Anna-Liisa's mother
- Greta Waahtera as Pirkko, Anna-Liisa's sister
- Emil Autere as Johannes Kivimaan, Anna-Liisa's fiancé
- Einar Rinne as Mikko
- Mimmi Lähteenoja as Husso, Mikko's mother
- Axel Ahlberg as the reverend
- Tauno Ensio Järvinen as Matti, the letter bearer boy

== Other versions ==
A first adaptation of Minna Canth's play was directed in 1911 by Teppo Raikas, where Teuvo Puro played the role of Mikko. It was never released and all material is now considered lost.

In 1945, a new version was directed by Orvo Saarikivi and in 1988 a television film by Tuija-Maija Niskanen.
