= Noidan kirot =

1927 Finnish horror film

- Directed by: Teuvo Puro
- Written by: Teuvo Puro
- Based on: Noidan kirot: kuvaus Lapin rajoilta by Väinö Kataja
- Produced by: Erkki Karu
- Starring: Einar Rinne; Heidi Blåfield; Irmeli Viherjuuri; Kaisa Leppänen; Hemmo Kallio; Olga Leino; Nisse Karlsson; Yrjö Tuominen; Hannes Närhi; Toivo Suonpää; Eero Kilpi; Karl Fager; Armas Fredman; Kalle Havas
- Cinematography: Frans Ekebom
- Production company: Suomi-Filmi
- Distributed by: Suomen Biografi
- Release date: 1927
- Running time: 82 minutes
- Country: Finland
- Languages: Silent film; Finnish and Swedish intertitles

Noidan kirot (1927)

Noidan kirot (Curses of the Witch, Swedish: Trolldomens förbannelse) is a 1927 Finnish horror drama film that was Finland's first-ever horror film. The film revolves around a newlywed couple who find that a witch put a curse on their house centuries ago.
