= Gyula Donáth =

Hungarian sculptor

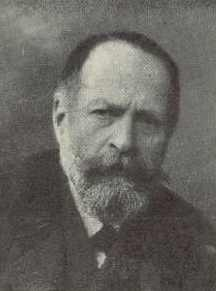
- Portrait of Gyula Donáth
- Born: March 13, 1850; Pest
- Died: September 27, 1909 (aged 59); Budapest
- Known for: Sculptor
- Notable work: Statue of Werbőczi
- Style: Classicism
- Movement: Art Nouveau

Gyula Donáth (March 13, 1850 – September 27, 1909), was a Hungarian sculptor.

He was born in Pest and studied in Vienna with G. Semper. From 1880 onwards he worked in Budapest. His sculptural style integrated elements of classicism and academic as well as the Art Nouveau styles. Much of his output as a sculptor was creating plastic art for tombs, though he also created public monuments for both the Millennium of Hungary (1898) and the Imperial Jubilee, (1908). It was Donáth who sculpted the "Statue of Werbőczi" (since then demolished).

Donáth's huge bronze Turul on the railing of Buda Castle, high above the Danube, was erected in 1903. It is one of the symbols of Budapest.

The representation of women in Art Nouveau is limited to iconographical types developed from a preoccupation with relatively few themes: the mystery of life and death, the relationship between the sexes, and women as an emblem of whatever was enigmatic or mysteriously attractive.

The author then goes on to include Donáth's opus Song of Lament as an example. (Berend)

Donáth died in Budapest.
