= Teuvo Puro =

Finnish actor, writer and director

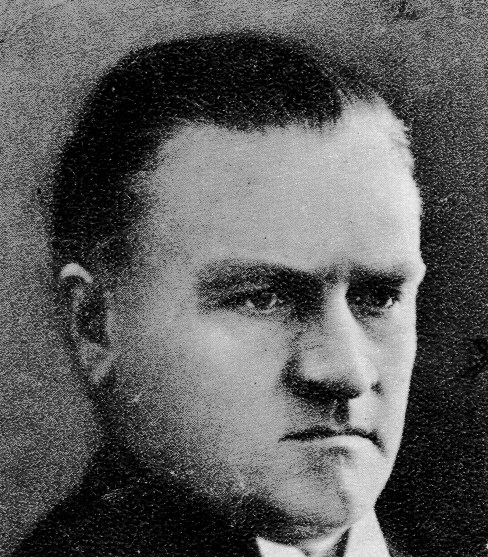
Teuvo Puro

Kaarlo Teuvo Puro (9 November 1884 Helsinki – 24 July 1956 Helsinki) was a Finnish actor, writer and director.

== Career ==
Puro co-directed the first Finnish fiction film, Salaviinanpolttajat, with Louis Sparre in 1907. He also directed the first (and one of the only) Finnish horror film Noidan kirot (Curses of the Witch) starring Einar Rinne and Heidi Blafield. Another film by Puro is Anna-Liisa (1922).
