= Gustaf af Geijerstam =

Swedish novelist

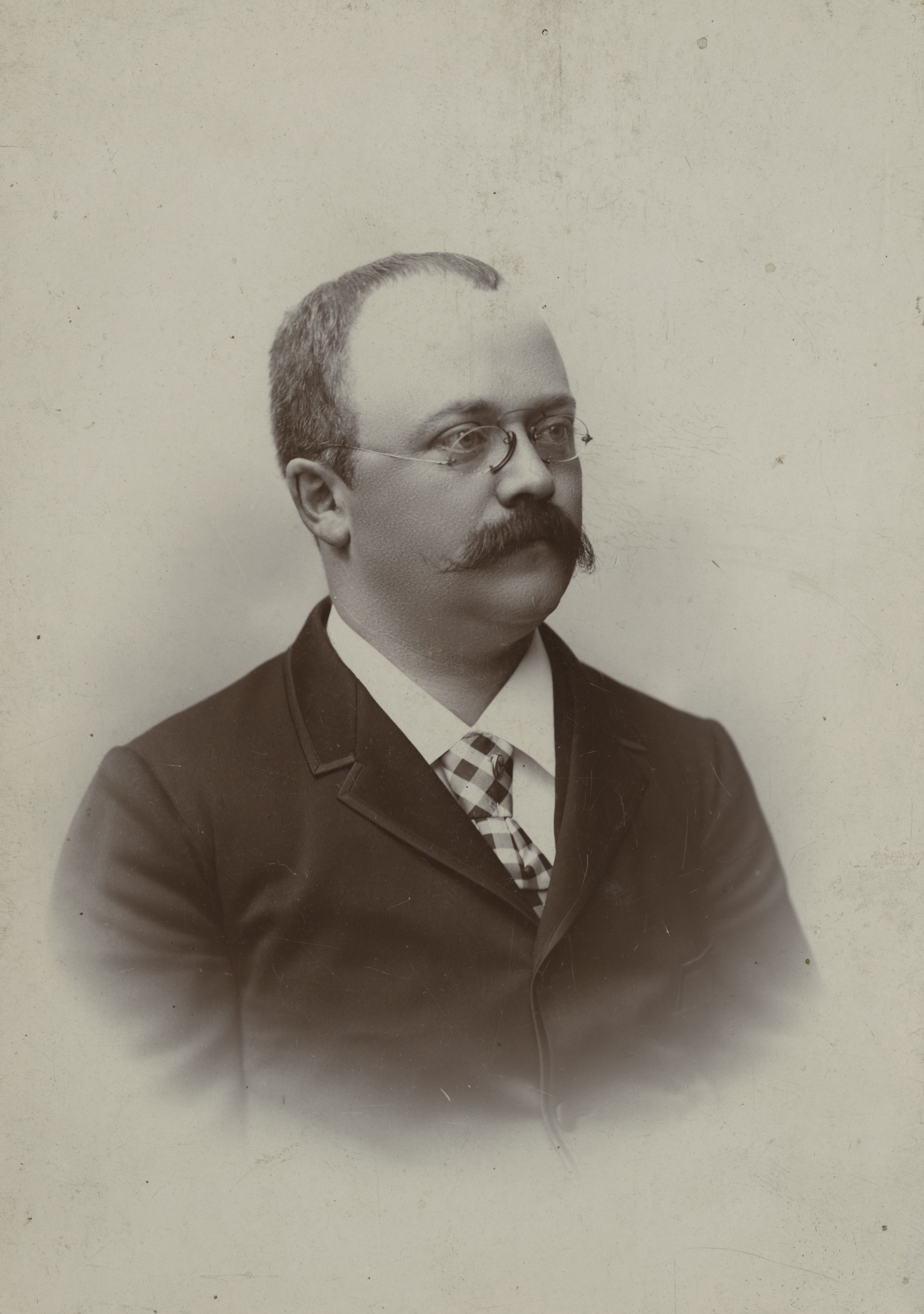
Gustaf af Geijerstam.

Gustaf af Geijerstam (1858–1909) was a Swedish novelist. He was a friend of August Strindberg's. Many of his works were translated into German during his lifetime, and one, Äktenskapets komedi (1898), was reviewed favorable by Rainer Maria Rilke, who remarked that Geijerstam was an author "one must follow attentively from book to book." Only two of his novels were translated into English: Boken om Lille-bror (1900), as "the Book about the Little Brother" in 1921, and Kvinnokraft (1901), as "Woman Power" in 1922. Other works include Erik Grane (1895), Karin Brandts dröm (1904) and Medusas hufvud (1905).

== Debate ==
In 1885, a Bishop had argued that God's order required that women were not emancipated. Geijerstam then argued that men could only aspire to one day have the purity of women because they were fundamentally different, and this was the reason for prostitution and other immorality. Minna Canth objected strongly to this argument, as it meant that men could defend their poor morals by reference to their implicit shortcomings, whereas any women involved in prostitution would lack the same defence.

Fyodor Dostoyevsky's mysticism and modern psychology's exploration of the soul brought new insights. The novel Medusa's Head (1895) has received contemporary attention for its decadent turn-of-the-century atmosphere, although Melker Johnsson has argued that the novel is closer to Zola's naturalism than to a general symbolism. Claes Ahlund, however, has shown that Medusa's head as a fin-de-siècle motif frames the entire novel.
