= Helen Marr Hurd =

American poet (1839–1909)

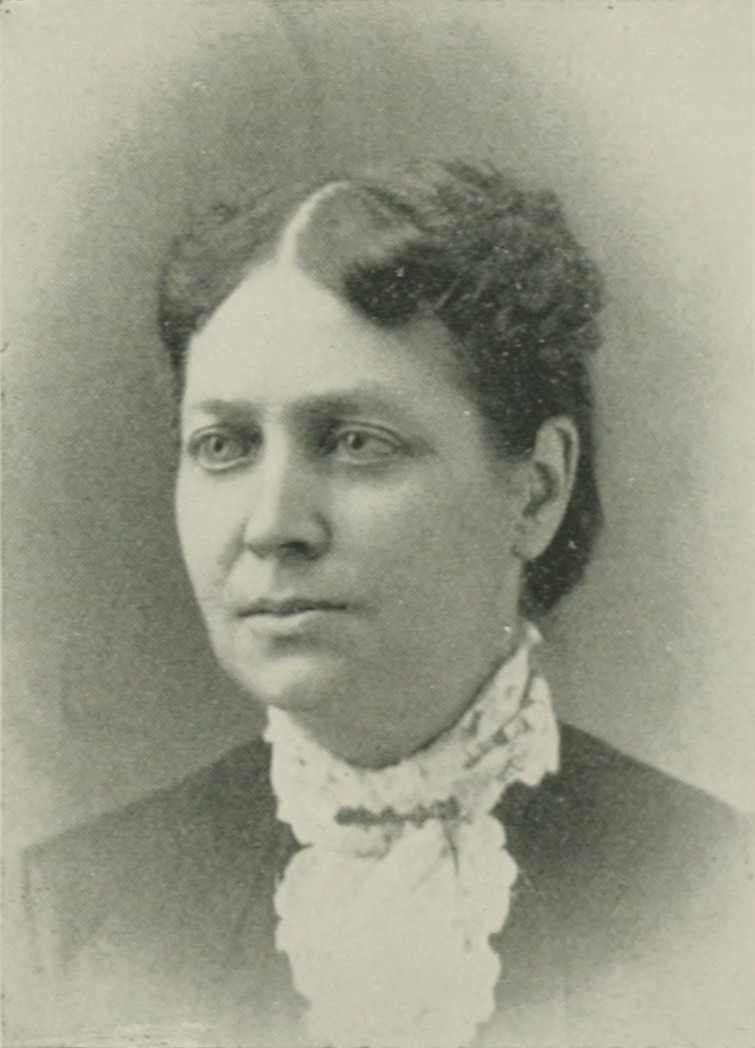
- Photo in A Woman of the Century
- Born: February 2, 1839; Harmony, Maine, U.S.
- Died: May 4, 1909 (aged 70); Saint Albans, Maine, U.S.
- Resting place: Libby Cemetery, in Harmony
- Occupations: teacher, poet
- Writing career
- Language: English
- Notable work: Poetical works of Helen Marr Hurd

Helen Marr Hurd (February 2, 1839 – May 4, 1909) was an American teacher and poet of the long nineteenth century. Living with severe myopia, she taught in thirty schools—until her eyes made teaching impossible. Thereafter, she devoted her time to literary pursuits. She was the author of an illustrated volume of poems.

== Biography ==
Helen Marr Hurd was born in Harmony, Maine, February 2, 1839, and was one of a family of six girls and a boy. Her father, Isaiah Hurd, 2nd, was the son of Jeremiah and Nancy Hurd, who went from New Hampshire and settled in Harmony when the town received its name from his mother. Isaiah grew to manhood always lived in that town. Her mother was Mary Page, a daughter of John and Hannah Page, who was related to the Pages and Walls of Hallowell and Augusta, Maine.

Before Helen was 11 years old, she had learned nearly the whole of the Bible. By 11 years old, she had written many disconnected bits of rhyme. On her 13th birthday, she wrote a little poem, and others soon followed. Between the years of 13 and 18, she composed two stories in verse and several other short poems.

An impediment to her studies was severe myopia. When she was 16 years of age her mother became a widow. She was in poor health and had to leave Hurd to her own resources for further education. Despite her disabilities she prepared herself for teaching in a normal class.

Hurd taught in some thirty schools—until compelled by increased trouble with her eyes to retire. She then devoted her time to literary pursuits. Hurd published a large volume, her "Poetical Works" illustrated by Allie Collins, and prepared another volume of poems, a novel and a history of Hallowell.

Hurd took an active interest in the temperance cause and other movements. She made her home in Athens, Maine. She died May 4, 1909, in Saint Albans, Maine, and is buried in the Libby Cemetery, in Harmony.

== Selected works ==
- What Christmas brings, 188?
- Poetical works of Helen Marr Hurd, 1887
- Sub montem. : Christmas and other poems, 1890
