= Anna Liisa =

1895 play by Minna Canth

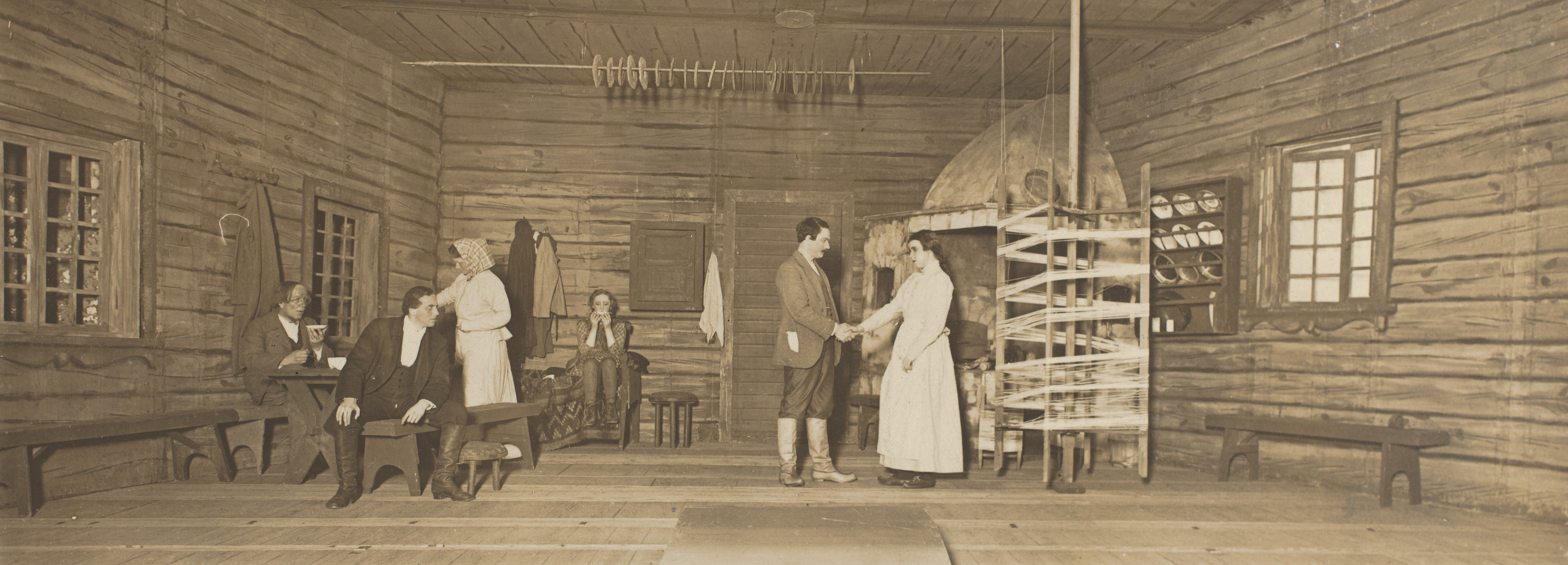
A production of Anna Liisa in 1921

Anna Liisa is a play in three acts written by Minna Canth, which debuted in 1895 in Finnish. It was premiered at the Finnish Theatre and has since been shown repeatedly in international theaters. Anna Liisa was the last play written by Canth, and is a significant departure from her usual realist writings in that the final act of the play contains a deus ex machina. Canth's second tragedy deals with a conservative Finnish village, and events that transpire surrounding the discovery of a newborn's murder by the titular character, Anna Liisa. There have also been multiple film adaptations of the play.

== Plot ==
It is revealed that the titular young, nervous maiden had a secret relationship with her parents' farmhand Mikko four years prior to when the narrative takes place, and gave birth to his illegitimate child - in a panic, she killed the child and buried it in the forest with the aid of Mikko's mother, Husso. The incident comes to light five years later, when the narrative takes place, when Anna Liisa becomes engaged to be married to her lover Johannes and Mikko returns again to demand Anna Liisa's hand in marriage, blackmailing her by threatening to reveal their affair and the murder of their child. Anna Liisa eventually ends up revealing the past event publicly, is absolved of her sins by the village parson, and willingly accepts her punishments of social repercussions and imprisonment by the sheriff. The play is a departure from Canth's usual positivistic realism in that there is a deus ex machina, or a sudden resolution to a seemingly unsolvable problem, in the third act through Anna Liisa being morally redeemed.

== Scholarly interpretations ==
An article by Brigham Young University scholar Wade Hollingshaus suggests ambilateralist aspects of the play as well as positivistic realist aspects. Canth made the decision to become a mother at a young age, despite being a bright student with a promising career ahead - this decision was a major turning point in her life and was one that she at times seemed to regret, but ultimately formed her as an author later in her life. Hollingshaus postulates that Canth's difficult decision is apparent in this play as the contrast between the strict moral code of Finnish peasants and the reality of life. Hollingshaus also suggests that Anna Liisa's redemption at the end of the play draws a duality between herself and the protagonist, as Canth believed that her decision to become a mother rather than a teacher would be judged by God on her 'judgement day'.
