= Minna Canth =

Finnish writer and social activist (1844–1897)

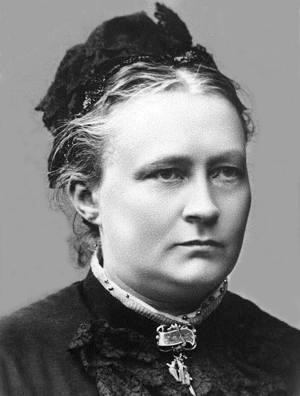
- Born: Ulrika Wilhelmina Johnson; 19 March 1844; Tampere, Finland, Russian Empire
- Died: 12 May 1897 (aged 53); Kuopio, Finland
- Occupations: writer, playwright
- Notable work: The Pastor's Family; The Worker's Wife; Anna Liisa
- Spouse: Johan Ferdinand Canth (husband)
- Children: Anni Canth (daughter); Elli Canth (daughter); Hanna Canth (daughter); Maiju Canth (daughter); Jussi Canth (son); Pekka Canth (son); Lyyli Canth (daughter)
- Parent(s): Gustaf Vilhelm Johnson (father); Lovisa Ulrika Archelin (mother)

Minna Canth (Finnish pronunciation: [minːɑ kɑnt]; born Ulrika Wilhelmina Johnson; 19 March 1844 – 12 May 1897) was a Finnish writer and social activist. Canth began to write while managing her family draper's shop and living as a widow raising seven children. Her work addresses issues of women's rights, particularly in the context of a prevailing culture she considered antithetical to permitting expression and realization of women's aspirations. The Worker's Wife and The Pastor's Family are her best known plays, but the play Anna Liisa is the most adapted to films and operas. In her time, she became a controversial figure, due to the asynchrony between her ideas and those of her time, and in part due to her strong advocacy for her point of view.

Minna Canth was the first major Finnish-language playwright and prose writer after Aleksis Kivi, the national author of Finland, and the first Finnish-language newspaper woman. She was also the first woman to receive her own flag flying day in Finland called Minna Canth Day, starting on 19 March 2007. It is also the day of social equality in Finland.

== Life and career ==
Canth was born in Tampere to Gustaf Vilhelm Johnsson (1816–1877) and his wife Ulrika (1811–1893). Her father worked at James Finlayson's textile factory initially as a worker and later as a foreman. Gustaf and Ulrika had four children, Minna included, of whom the eldest, Adolf, died in infancy. Minna's surviving siblings were Gustaf (1850–1894) and Augusta (1852–1877). In 1853 her father was given charge of Finlayson's textile shop in Kuopio and the entire family relocated there.

Canth received an exceptionally thorough education for a working-class woman of her time. Even before moving to Kuopio she had attended school at Finlayson's factory which was intended for the workers' children. In Kuopio she continued to go to various girls' schools and as a testament to her father's success as a shopkeeper, she was even admitted into a school intended for upper class children. In 1863 she began her studies at the recently founded Jyväskylä Teacher Seminary, which was the first school in Finland to offer higher education for women.

In 1865 she married her natural sciences teacher, Johan Ferdinand Canth (1835–1879), and had to drop out of the Seminary. Between 1866 and 1880 she gave birth to seven children: Anni (1866–1911), Elli (1868–1944), Hanna (1870–1889), Maiju (1872–1943), Jussi (1874–1929), Pekka (1876–1959) and Lyyli (1880–1969); her husband Johan died in 1879 shortly before the birth of the family's seventh child. She began her writing career at the newspaper Keski-Suomi, where her husband worked as an editor. She wrote about women's issues and advocated temperance. In 1876 the Canths were forced to leave the paper because Minna's writings had roused some bad blood; they were, however, both employed by the competing Päijänne the following year. Minna published her first works of fiction on the pages of Päijänne: various short stories, which were compiled in her first book, Novelleja ja kertomuksia, in 1878.

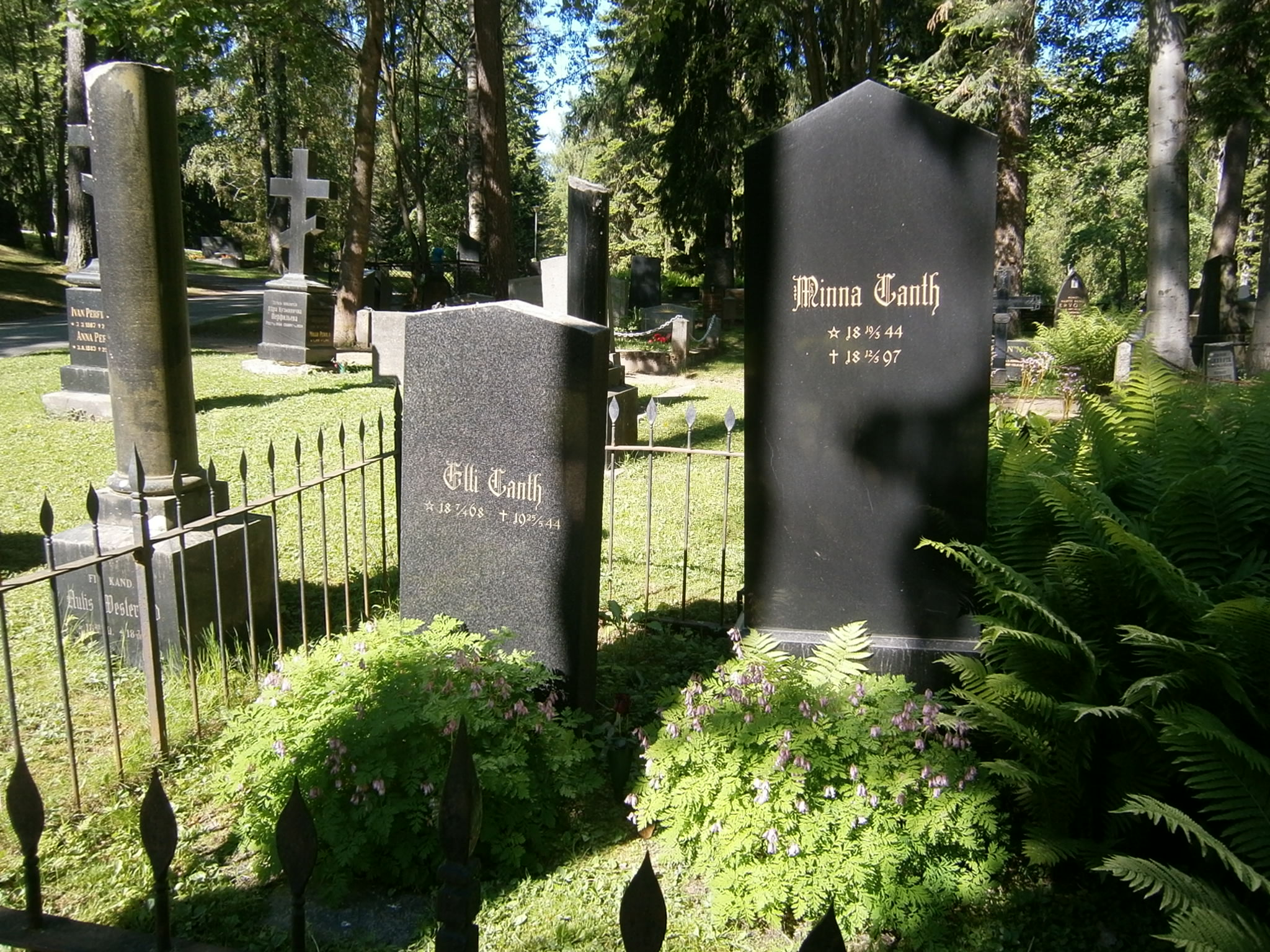
A family grave of Minna Canth at Great Cemetery of Kuopio in the Puijo district of Kuopio, North Savo

Canth died suddenly of a heart attack at the age of 53 on May 12, 1897 at her home in Kuopio. She was buried in a family grave in Kuopio Cemetery.

== Debate ==
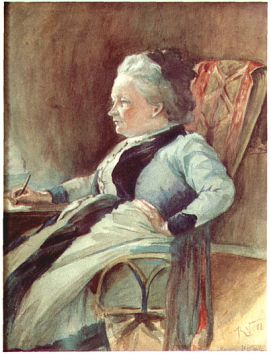
1891 portrait of Minna Canth, aged 47, by Kaarlo Vuori

Canth stood out when there was public debate about women's rights. In 1885 a bishop had argued that God's order required that women were not emancipated. The writer Gustaf af Geijerstam then argued that men could only aspire to one day have the purity of women because they were fundamentally different and this was the reason for prostitution and other immorality. Canth objected strongly to this argument as it meant that men could defend their poor morals by reference to their implicit shortcomings, whereas any women involved in prostitution would lack the same defence.

== Most important works ==
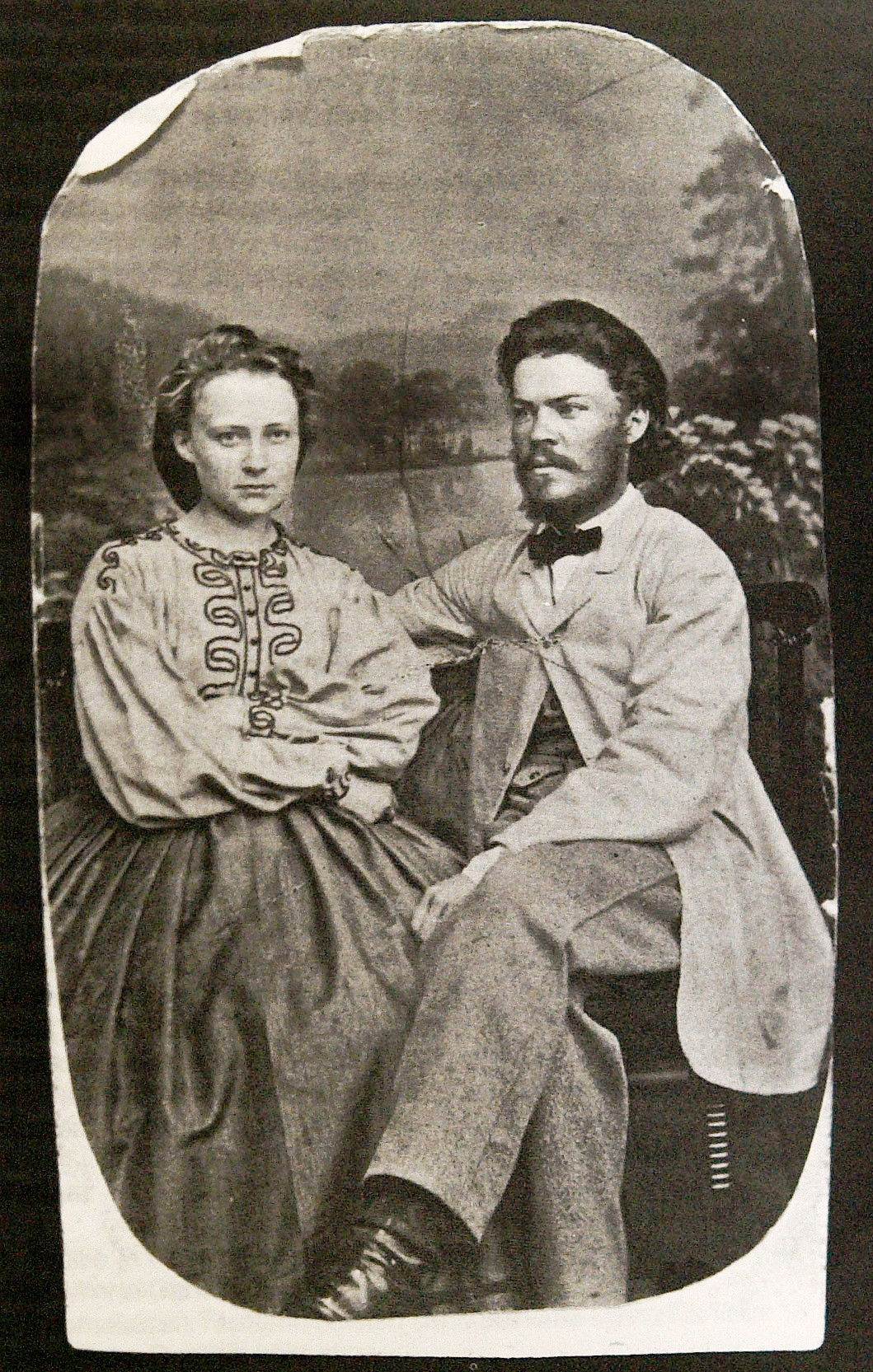
Minna and Johan Ferdinand Canth in Jyväskylä, where Minna lived until the death of her husband.

Minna Canth published a total of ten plays, seven short stories, as well as newspaper articles and speeches. As a central representative of realism of her time, she mainly looked at the ills of society in her works. Canth's most important works are the plays Työmiehen vaimo (The Worker's Wife) from 1885 and Anna Liisa, penned in 1895.

In Työmiehen vaimo, the main character Johanna is married to Risto, an alcoholic who wastes all his wife's money. Johanna cannot prevent him – her money is legally his, not hers. The play's premiere caused scandal, but a few months later, parliament enacted a new law about separation of property.

Anna Liisa is a tragedy about a fifteen-year-old girl who gets pregnant without being married – she manages to hide her pregnancy, and when the child is born, she suffocates it in a fit of panic. Her boyfriend Mikko's mother helps her – she buries the baby in the woods, but a few years later, when Anna Liisa wants to marry her fiancé Johannes, she is blackmailed by Mikko and his mother. They threaten her to reveal her dark secret if she does not agree to marry Mikko, but Anna Liisa refuses. In the end, she decides to confess what she has done. She is taken to prison, but is much relieved after owning up and seems to have found peace.

== In popular culture ==
A two-part television mini-series about Minna Canth called Minna, written by Lauri Leskinen and directed by Mauno Hyvönen, was released in 1977. In the mini-series, Minna Canth is played by Anja Pohjola.

In 2022, an opera called Minnan taivas about Minna's life and work was staged in Finland, written by Veera Airas with composer Jukka Linkola.

== Tribute ==
Canth is remembered in Finland through placenames, publications, medals, commemorative coins, stamps, paintings, plays, exhibitions and events. Many different construction sites and places have been named after her, along with cultural clubs and other communities. The Finnish Fair Foundation (Suomen Messusäätiö) has funded the Minna Canth Prize, which is awarded annually to the "shaker of our society" at the Helsinki Book Fair. The prize is 5,000 euros.

Statues of Minna Canth have been erected in Kuopio, Tampere and Jyväskylä; the statue in Kuopio was unveiled on 12 May 1937. The city of Kuopio has also organized Canth's anniversaries on several occasions, such as an event called Minnan päivät ("Days of Minna"), either during the tenth anniversary of her birth or death; for example, the 21st century has already been celebrated twice, in 2004 and 2007.

On 19 March 2017, Google celebrated her 173rd birthday with a Google Doodle.

== Translations ==
Canth, Minna: The Burglary and The House of Roinila. Translated into English by Richard Impola. Aspasia Books, Beaverton 2010.
