= Lists of cemeteries =

Cemeteries around the world

These lists of cemeteries compile notable cemeteries, mausolea, and other places people are buried worldwide. Reasons for notability include their design, their history, and their interments.

== Lists of cemeteries by country ==
=== Africa ===
==== Algeria ====
- Thaalibia Cemetery, Casbah of Algiers
- St. Eugene Cemetery, Algiers
- Sidi Garidi Cemetery, Kouba
- Sidi M'hamed Bou Qobrine Cemetery, Belouizdad
- El Kettar Cemetery, Oued Koriche

==== Egypt ====
- Beni Hasan
- City of the Dead (Cairo)
- Deir El Bersha
- El Bagawat
- El Hawawish
- Fagg El Gamous
- Gabbari necropolis
- Halfaya Sollum War Cemetery
- Heliopolis War Cemetery
- Meir, Egypt
- Rifeh
- El Sheikh Sa'id
- Tell El Kebir
- Umm El Qa'ab

==== Morocco ====
- Bab Aghmat cemetery
- Bab Ftouh cemetery
- Bab Mahrouk cemetery
- Ben M'Sik European Cemetery
- Chellah – archaeological site and necropolis
- Jewish Cemetery of Marrakech
- Jewish Cemetery in Fez
- Marinid Tombs
- Saadian Tombs

==== Nigeria ====
- Ibadan Military Cemetery
- Ikoyi Cemetery
- Port Harcourt Cemetery
- Yaba Cemetery
- Mubo Cemetery
- Atan Cemetery
- Hawkins Cemetery

==== South Africa ====
- Westpark Cemetery

=== Americas ===
==== Argentina ====
- La Recoleta Cemetery, Buenos Aires – burial site of Eva Perón, Federico Leloir, and many other Argentine figures
- La Chacarita Cemetery (or "National Cemetery"), Buenos Aires – burial site of Juan Peron (until 2006), Carlos Gardel and many other notables.
- Cementerio del Oeste, Tucumán
- Cementerio San José de Flores, Buenos Aires

==== Bolivia ====
- General Cemetery of La Paz
- General Cemetery of Santa Cruz
- La Llamita Cemetery

==== Brazil ====
- Cemitério da Consolação, São Paulo – burial site of writer Mário de Andrade, Monteiro Lobato, painter Tarsila do Amaral, former Brazil's president Campos Sales
- Cemitério do Morumbi, São Paulo – burial site of singer Elis Regina, F1 racer Ayrton Senna, actor and comedian Ronald Golias
- Cemitério dos Protestantes, São Paulo
- Cemitério de Vila Formosa, São Paulo – the biggest cemetery in Latin America
- Cemitério São João Batista, Botafogo, Rio de Janeiro. Burial site of Alberto Santos-Dumont, early pioneer of aviation; singer/actress Carmen Miranda, and composer Tom Jobim.

==== Colombia ====
- Central Cemetery of Bogotá – Burial site of several national heroes, poets and former Colombian presidents
- Central Cemetery of Tunja
- Central Cemetery of Valledupar
- Jardines de Paz
- San Pedro Cemetery Museum

==== Ecuador ====
- Cementerio General de Guayaquil
- Cementerio de Tulcán
- Cementerio de San Diego (Quito)

==== Falkland Islands ====
- Argentine Military Cemetery – military cemetery on East Falkland that holds the remains of 237 Argentine combatants killed during the 1982 Falklands War.
- Blue Beach Military Cemetery at San Carlos – British war cemetery holding the remains of 14 of the 255 British casualties killed during the Falklands War.

==== Paraguay ====
- National Pantheon of the Heroes
- Recoleta Cemetery, Asuncion

==== Peru ====
- Chauchilla Cemetery – over 1,000 years old
- Nueva Esperanza Cemetery – popular cemetery in southern Lima
- Presbítero Maestro – cemetery in Lima with significant political and military figures
- Sillustani-Incan Burial Ground

==== Uruguay ====
===== Puerto Rico =====
- Cementerio Católico San Vicente de Paul
- Cementerio Municipal de Mayagüez
- Panteón Nacional Román Baldorioty de Castro
- Puerto Rico National Cemetery
- Santa María Magdalena de Pazzis Cemetery

=== Asia ===
==== Bangladesh ====
- Christian cemetery, over 200 years old.
- Chittagong Commonwealth War Cemetery
- Maynamati War Cemetery

==== India ====
- Agaram cemetery, Bangalore
- Armenian Cemetery, Hyderabad
- Arthat St. Mary's Orthodox Cathedral, Kunnamkulam
- Badakabarastan
- Bahishti Maqbara
- Christian Cemetery, Narayanguda
- Daira Mir Momin
- Delhi War Cemetery
- Jafarganj Cemetery
- Jairampur cemetery
- Kohima War Cemetery
- Khushbagh
- Kirkee War Cemetery
- Lothian Cemetery
- Lower circular road cemetery
- Madras War Cemetery
- Malkha Cemetery
- Mazar-e-Qasmi
- Mazar-e-Shura
- Mazar-i-Salatin
- Nicholson Cemetery, New Delhi
- Portuguese Cemetery, Kollam
- Scottish Cemetery, Calcutta
- Sewri Christian Cemetery
- South Park Street Cemetery
- St. John's Church, Meerut
- York Cemetery, New Delhi

==== Iraq ====
- Wadi-us-Salaam

==== Saudi Arabia ====
- Al-Adl cemetery, Mecca
- Al Oud cemetery, Riyadh
- Al-Baqi Cemetery, Medina
- Jannat al-Mu'alla, Mecca
- Non–Muslim Cemetery, Jeddah
- Shalaga cemetery, Riyadh

==== South Korea ====
- Seoul National Cemetery
- United Nations Memorial Cemetery

==== Taiwan ====
- Chin Pao San
- Wuchih Mountain Military Cemetery

==== Thailand ====
- Bangkok Protestant Cemetery
- Chungkai War Cemetery
- Kanchanaburi War Cemetery
- Royal Cemetery at Wat Ratchabophit

==== Uzbekistan ====
- Shah-i-Zinda(شاه زنده in Persian meaning "The Living King") is one of the world-known necropolises of Central Asia, which is situated in the northeastern part of Samarkand. The Shah-i-Zinda Ensemble includes mausoleums and other ritual buildings of 9–14th and 19th centuries.
- Gur-e-Amir, Samarkand

==== Vietnam ====
- Mai Dich Cemetery – cemetery established after French occupation ended in 1954 in Hanoi as a place of worship for heroes of the people. Those buried here include statesmen, writers, poets, and others who have close ties to Vietnam's current government.
- Trường Sơn Cemetery – cemetery established in 1977, after the unification of Vietnam in 1975 as a place of worship for heroes of people. Those buried are soldiers, commanders who sacrificed to build Ho Chi Minh trail during the war against America. It is located in Quảng Trị and has about 72 thousand martyrs.
- Hàng Dương Cemetery – cemetery established 1992 as a place of worship for revolutionary soldiers and heroes who were imprisoned and killed by Republic of Vietnam (South Vietnam) and America.
- Mạc Đĩnh Chi Cemetery – Located in the heart of former Saigon, Mac Dinh Chi was South Vietnam's most prestigious French colonial cemetery reserved for celebrities, politicians and the upper class. Ngo Dinh Diem and his brother Ngo Dinh Nhu were interred here. In the early 1980s, Vietnam's government declared the place a corrupt reminder of the past and dissolved the cemetery by 1983. In accordance to new laws, bodies in Mac Dinh Chi were exhumed, cremated and given to remaining family members whenever possible. A park was built on top of the cemetery.
- Bien Hoa Cemetery – a cemetery for soldiers of Army of Republic of South Vietnam who died during Vietnam War. It is located in Bình Dương Province.

=== Europe ===
==== Azerbaijan ====
- Martyrs' Lane
- Alley of Honor

==== Austria ====
- Zentralfriedhof, Vienna

==== Belgium ====
- Brussels Cemetery, Brussels
- Laeken Cemetery, Brussels
- Schaerbeek New Cemetery, Schaerbeek, Brussels
- Campo Santo, Gent
- Ixelles Cemetery, Ixelles
- Schoonselhof Cemetery, Antwerp
- Fort de Locin, Liège

==== Bosnia and Herzegovina ====
- Bare Cemetery – Sarajevo

==== Croatia ====
- Mirogoj Cemetery – Zagreb
- Kozala Cemetery – Rijeka

==== Czech Republic ====
- Sedlec Ossuary – Kutná Hora
- Old Jewish Cemetery, Prague
- Ďáblice cemetery, Prague
- Olšany Cemetery, Prague – the biggest graveyard in the Czech Republic
- New Jewish Cemetery, Prague – built next to the Olšany Cemetery to alleviate the space problems faced by the Old Jewish Cemetery, it is the burial place of Franz Kafka
- Vyšehrad cemetery, Prague – the Czech Republic's most important cemetery, it is the burial site for Antonín Dvořák, Alphonse Mucha and Bedřich Smetana, amongst others.

==== Denmark ====
- Assistens Cemetery – here rests f.i. Hans Christian Andersen, Niels Bohr, Hans Christian Ørsted, Søren Kierkegaard, Christoffer Wilhelm Eckersberg, Christen Købke, Ben Webster and Kenny Drew.
- Holmen Cemetery, Copenhagen
- Garrison Cemetery, Copenhagen
- Roskilde Domkirke
- Vestre Cemetery, Copenhagen
- Bispebjerg Cemetery, Copenhagen

==== Finland ====
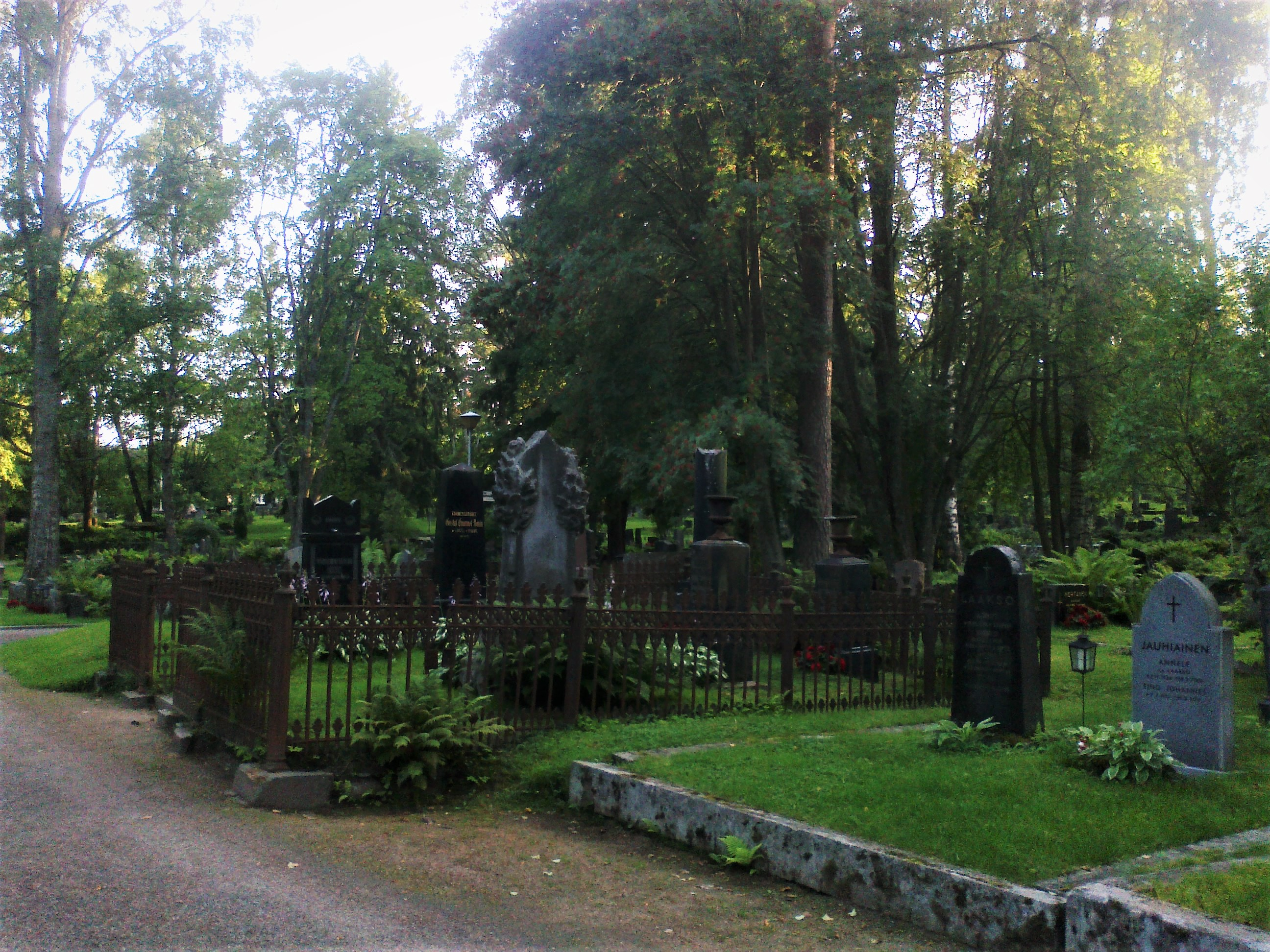
The Great Cemetery of Kuopio

- Great Cemetery of Kuopio, Kuopio
- Hietaniemi Cemetery, Helsinki
- Kalevankangas Cemetery, Tampere
- Kulosaari Cemetery, Helsinki
- Malmi Cemetery, Helsinki
- Oulu Cemetery, Oulu
- Turku Cemetery, Turku

==== Greece ====
- First Cemetery of Athens – Cemetery in Central Athens, including the graves of many famous Greek politicians and celebrities like Melina Mercouri, Andreas Papandreou, George Papandreou, George Seferis, Manos Hadjidakis.
- Anastaseos tou Kyriou (Resurrection of Lord) – The biggest public cemetery of Greece. Located east of Thessaloniki.
- Akrotiri, Chania, Crete – Venizelos' tombs. Burial site of the politician Eleftherios Venizelos.
- Vergina, Pella – (Macedonian Tombs). Tomb of the ancient Macedonian King, Philip II of Macedon.
- Tatoi Royal Cemetery – Athens.
- Mikra British Cemetery – Located in the municipality of Kalamaria, in Thessaloniki. The Memorial commemorates 478 nurses, officers and men of the Commonwealth forces who died when troop transports and hospital ships were lost in the Mediterranean, and who have no grave but the sea.
- Skorpios Island, Ionian Sea – Burial site of 20th century's shipping magnate Aristotle Onassis and his daughter Christina Onassis.

==== Norway ====
- Cemetery of Our Saviour - cemetery in Oslo

==== Poland ====
- Central Cemetery – cemetery in Szczecin
- Powązki Cemetery – cemetery in Warsaw
- Rakowicki Cemetery – in Kraków
- New Jewish Cemetery, Kraków
- Remuh Cemetery – in Kraków

==== Portugal ====
- Cemitério da Ajuda, Lisbon
- Cemitério do Alto de São João, Lisbon
- Prazeres Cemetery, Lisbon
- Cemitério de Agramonte, Porto
- Cemitério do Prado do Repouso, Porto

==== Slovakia ====
- National Cemetery, Martin
- Slavín, Bratislava
- Slávičie údolie, Bratislava
- Chatam Sofer Memorial, Bratislava, a burial place of orthodox rabbi Moses Schreiber (1762–1839)

==== Spain ====
- Montjuïc Cemetery, Barcelona
- Poblenou Cemetery, Barcelona
- Cementerio de la Almudena, Madrid
- Cementerio de San Isidro, Madrid, the oldest and most monumental cemetery in Madrid (1811): http://cementeriodesanisidro.com
- Cementerio de San Justo, Madrid, built in 1847
- English Cemetery, Málaga
- Polloe Cemetery, San Sebastian, built 1878
- Cementerio de Lloret de Mar, Gerona, built 1901, example of modernisme.

==== Sweden ====
- Riddarholmen Church, Stockholm
- Uppsala Cathedral is the burial site for several Swedish kings and queens from the 16th and 17th century, as well as Carl Linnaeus and Emanuel Swedenborg. The nearby Old Graveyard houses the grave of Dag Hammarskjöld.
- Östra kyrkogården, Gothenburg lies in east Gothenburg and is the burial site for several famous Swedes, including Karin Boye, Otto Nordenskiöld and Ivar Arosenius.
- Malmö gamla begravningsplats, Malmö
- Norra Begravningsplatsen, established in 1827 in northern Stockholm, is the burial site for a number of Swedish notables including Alfred Nobel, Ingrid Bergman and Ulrich Salchow.
- Skogskyrkogården, a relatively new cemetery opened in 1920 in southern Stockholm, exists as UNESCO World Heritage Site by decision by Swedish authorities. Amongst others, the cemetery contains the graves of actress Greta Garbo.
- Norra kyrkogården in Lund

==== Switzerland ====
- Bremgartenfriedhof, Bern is the burial place of revolutionary anarchist Michail Alexandrowitsch Bakunin
- Cimetière des Rois, Geneva, burial place of Protestant reformer John Calvin
- Cemetery of Celigny, Geneva, burial place of Richard Burton, Vilfredo Pareto and Alistair MacLean
- Friedhof am Hörnli, Riehen BS, burial place of Heinrich Altherr, Karl Barth, Ernst Beyeler, Lore Berger, Jacob Burckhardt, Dare (graffiti artist), Fritz Haber, Karin Himboldt, Emanuel Hoffmann, Clara Immerwahr, Karl Jaspers, Charlotte von Kirschbaum, Markus Mattmüller, Paul Hermann Müller, Albert Nicholas, Alfred Rasser, Jean Roux, Maja Sacher, Paul Sacher, Fritz Sarasin, Paul Sarasin, Adrienne von Speyr, Hermann Suter, Hans Martin Sutermeister, Eduard Thurneysen, Mark Tobey, Hans-Peter Tschudi, Rudolf Tschudi, Jacob Wackernagel, Irène Zurkinden
- Gottesacker in Riehen BS, burial place of Karl August Auberlen

==== Ukraine ====
- Lychakiv Cemetery, Lviv
- Baikove Cemetery, Kyiv
- Jewish cemetery of Chernivtsi
- Jewish cemetery of Khotyn

==== United Kingdom ====
===== Scotland =====
- Canongate Kirkyard, Edinburgh, Scotland – Resting place of Adam Smith, regarded as the founder of modern economics
- Greyfriars Kirkyard, Edinburgh – Greyfriars Bobby the Skye terrier
- Glasgow Necropolis, Glasgow, Scotland – elaborate mausolea
- Iona Abbey, resting place of many kings of Scotland, and Labour leader John Smith

===== Wales =====
- Aberfan Cemetery – Most of the victims of the Aberfan coal tip disaster of 21 October 1966 are buried here
- Cathays Cemetery, Cardiff – One of the largest cemeteries in the United Kingdom; opened in 1859; covering over 100 acres (0.40 km^{2}) of land
- Cefn Golau Cholera Cemetery - The only surviving cholera cemetery in South Wales and one of the few remaining in Britain
- Cwmgelli Cemetery, Swansea – First public cemetery in Wales to have no consecrated ground
- St Woolos Cemetery, Newport – Opened in 1854, the first municipally owned cemetery in Wales

=== Oceania ===
==== Papua New Guinea ====
- Lae War Cemetery
- Port Moresby (Bomana) War Cemetery
- Rabaul (Bita Paka) War Cemetery

== See also ==
- Taphophilia
- List of mausolea
- List of necropoleis
