= Port Harcourt Cemetery =

Cemetery in Port Harcourt, Nigeria

- Interactive map of Port Harcourt Cemetery

Details
- Location: Old Township, Port Harcourt
- Country: Nigeria
- Coordinates: 4°45′49″N 7°1′39″E
- Type: Public
- Owned by: City of Port Harcourt

Port Harcourt Cemetery is a city-owned and operated public cemetery located along Aggrey Road in the Old Township district of Port Harcourt, the Rivers State capital. It is the oldest cemetery still in use in the city and is notable as the burial site of activist Ken Saro-Wiwa and his associates the Ogoni Nine. It also contains one commonwealth burial of soldiers of World War II.

== Interments ==
- Ken Saro-Wiwa (1941–1995), writer and activist
- Mike Lloyd Toku (1993–2012)
- Stephen Edward Murray-Bruce (1939–2013)

== See also ==
- List of cemeteries in Nigeria
