= Puijo (district) =

City district in Kuopio, Finland

Coordinates: 62°54′11″N 27°40′24″E

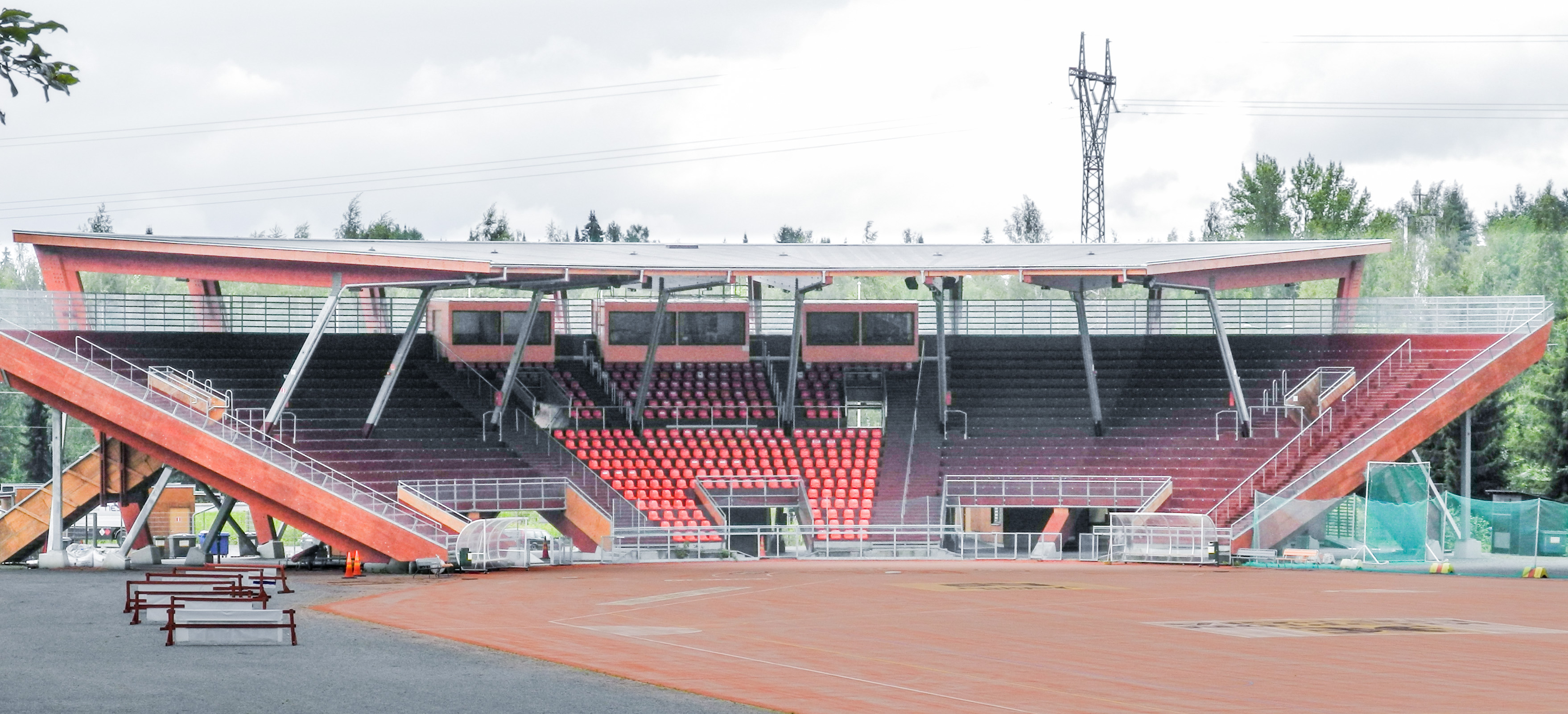
Puijo's Pesäpallo Stadium

Puijo is a district of Kuopio, Finland. It is located north of the center of Kuopio, along the European route E63. The area includes, among other things, Puijo Hill with its nature reserves, and the Great Cemetery of Kuopio on the south side of the hill between the five roads and the railroad track. There are many exercise and sports venues in the district.

Right at the northern end of Sokos Hotel Puijonsarvi, the Puijo district extends to Lake Kallavesi, on the eastern side of the peninsula it is bordered by the Päiväranta, Kettulanlahti and Rahusenkangas districts. To the east of Puijo are districts Julkula, Rypysuo and Puijonlaakso.
