= Rudolf Braun (historian) =

Swiss historian

Rudolf Braun (18 April 1930 in Basel – 19 May 2012 in Basel; originally from Basel) was a Swiss historian.

== Biography ==
Braun was the son of a geologist. He attended Mathematical-Natural Scientific High School of Basel and later studied folklore and history from 1950 to 1958 at the universities of Freiburg, Basel and Zurich before he earned a doctor's degree (Dr. phil.) in 1960. He worked as an assistant at the Center for Social Research of Dortmund from 1959 to 1961 and as a scientific assistant in Chicago from 1961 to 1964, before he qualified as a professor at the University of Bern in 1964. He subsequently wrote a paper about integration problems of Italian guest workers in Switzerland. He became a lecturer in 1966 and was an ordinary professor of social and economic history at the Free University of Berlin from 1968 to 1971. From 1971 to 1995, he was an ordinary professor of general and Swiss modern history at the University of Zurich.

He was one of the pioneering social historians of German-speaking Switzerland alongside Markus Mattmüller (Basel) and Erich Gruner (Bern). In his diversified works, he linked political, social and cultural history.

He co-organised the first seminar for women's history at the University of Zurich with his assistant Jakob Tanner.

== Works ==
As an author

- Die Veränderungen der Lebensformen in einem ländlichen Industriegebiet vor 1800 (Zürcher Oberland) (= Industrialisierung und Volksleben. vol. 1). Erlenbach/Stuttgart: Rentsch, 1960, DNB-IDN 450597113; 2nd edition: Göttingen, Vandenhoeck & Ruprecht, 1979.
- Sozialer und kultureller Wandel in einem ländlichen Industriegebiet (Zürcher Oberland) unter Einwirkung des Maschinen- und Fabrikwesens im 19. und 20. Jahrhundert (= Industrialisierung und Volksleben. vol. 2). Winterthur / Rentsch, Erlenbach/Stuttgart: Keller, 1965, DNB-IDN 450597148 (dissertation, University of Zurich, Philosophy Faculty I, [1960]); 2. Auflage: Vandenhoeck & Ruprecht, Göttingen 1979, ISBN 3-525-36174-2; 2nd edition: Zurich: Chronos, 1999, ISBN 3-905313-29-4.
- Das ausgehende Ancien Régime in der Schweiz. Aufriß einer Sozial- und Wirtschaftsgeschichte des 18. Jahrhunderts. Göttingen/Zurich: Vandenhoeck & Ruprecht, 1984, ISBN 3-525-36182-3.
- with David Gugerli: Macht des Tanzes – Tanz der Mächtigen. Hoffeste und Herrschaftszeremoniell 1550–1914. Munich Beck, 1993, ISBN 3-406-37550-2.
- Von den Heimarbeitern zur europäischen Machtelite. Ausgewählte Aufsätze. Zurich: Chronos, 2000, ISBN 3-905313-47-2.

As an editor

- with Wolfram Fischer, Helmut Großkreutz, Heinrich Volkmann: Industrielle Revolution, wirtschaftliche Aspekte (= Neue wissenschaftliche Bibliothek. vol. 50). Köln/Berlin: Kiepenheuer und Witsch, 1972, ISBN 3-462-00871-4.
- with Wolfram Fischer, Helmut Großkreutz, Heinrich Volkmann: Gesellschaft in der industriellen Revolution (= Neue wissenschaftliche Bibliothek. vol. 56). Cologne: Kiepenheuer und Witsch, 1973, ISBN 3-462-00925-7.

== Bibliography ==
- Sebastian Brändli, David Gugerli, Rudolf Jaun, Ulrich Pfister (Hrsg.): Schweiz im Wandel. Studien zur neueren Gesellschaftsgeschichte. Festschrift für Rudolf Braun zum 60. Geburtstag. Helbing und Lichtenhahn, Basel/Frankfurt am Main 1990, ISBN 3-7190-1058-9.
