= John Reddie =

Scottish lawyer and judge

John Reddie FRSE LLD (1805–1851) was a 19th-century Scottish lawyer and colonial judge.

== Life ==
Reddie was born in Glasgow on 6 May 1805, the son of James Reddie (1773-1852), an advocate, and his wife Charlotte Marion Campbell. He was one of seven children, including Major General George Burd Reddie. The family lived at 7 Frederick Street.

He studied law at the University of Edinburgh and passed the Scottish bar as an advocate in 1826. In 1827 he was elected a Fellow of the Royal Society of Edinburgh, his proposer was Sir Henry Wellwood-Moncrieff. In 1830 he was working in Edinburgh as an advocate and living at 6 Dundas Street in the city's New Town.

In 1836 he was made Chief Justice of St Lucia in the West Indies. Around 1840 he moved to India as First Judge of the Small Claims Court.

He died in Calcutta on 28 November 1851, probably of cholera. He is buried in the Scottish Cemetery at Calcutta.
