= Thomas Jones (missionary) =

Welsh Christian missionary to India and Bangladesh (1810–1849)

Reverend Thomas Jones

Personal life
- Born: 24 January 1810
- Died: 16 September 1849 (aged 39)
- Buried: Scottish Cemetery at Calcutta, Kolkata
- Home town: Berriew, Wales

Religious life
- Religion: Christianity
- Church: Presbyterian Church of Wales
- Ordination: 1840

Thomas Jones (24 January 1810 – 16 September 1849) was a Welsh Christian missionary, who worked among the Khasi people of Meghalaya and Assam in India and of Bangladesh. He recorded the Khasi language in Roman script, and the inscription on his gravestone calls him "The founding father of the Khasi alphabet and literature".

In 2018, the state government announced that 22 June, the date of Jones's arrival at Sohra, would be celebrated as "Thomas Jones Day" every year in the state of Meghalaya.

== Biography ==
Thomas Jones, born in 1810, was a carpenter's son from Berriew (Aberriw), Montgomeryshire, Wales.

He became a Calvinistic Methodist minister in 1840 and shortly afterwards set out for India, with his wife Anne. After their arrival in Calcutta, Anne gave birth to a child, who did not survive. The couple went on into the Khasia Hills, Meghalaya, with the aim of converting the Khasi people to Christianity. Thomas Jones succeeded better than the missionaries whom William Carey had sent to the hills in the 1830s. Jones's skills in carpentry and other crafts were valued by the Khasi community, and he learned their language by living among them. He opened a missionary school, and began preaching to the local people in their own language, with such fluency that they could not but marvel. In 1842 he produced a Khasi Reader, and translated a Welsh-language work, Rhodd Mam, into Khasi; these were the first books written in the Khasi language. He also compiled a Khasi alphabet and dictionary.

The gravestone of Thomas Jones in the Scottish Cemetery, Calcutta.

In 1846 Anne Jones died in childbirth, and Thomas Jones married Emma Cattell, an act which got him into trouble with the Missionary Society 'as she was only fifteen years old'. A son, Thomas Cattell Jones, was born posthumously. A failed attempt to set up his own mission at Pomreng led to further difficulties with the authorities, who abandoned him in 1847.

As a result of his criticisms of a local industrialist, Harry Inglis, Jones was forced to leave the area. He contracted malaria, of which he died on 16 September 1849. He is buried in the Scottish Cemetery at Calcutta.

== Sources ==
- Nigel Jenkins, Gwalia in Khasia (1995)
- D. Ben Rees (ed.), Vehicles of Grace and Hope: Welsh Missionaries in India 1840-1970 (2002)
- Andrew J. May, Welsh Missionaries and British Imperialism: The Empire of Clouds in North-East India (2012)
- David R Syiemlieh, "Thomas Jones' Injudicious Marriage?" Proceedings of the North East India History Association, Fifteenth Session, Doimukh, (1994)
