= Aggrey Road =

Road in Rivers State, Nigeria

Coordinates: 4°45′42″N 7°1′25″E

Aggrey Road is a major east–west arterial road located within the Old Township district in South Port Harcourt in Rivers State, Nigeria. It is well known for its growing economic activity and consists of predominantly commercial office buildings and retail outlets, only a small number of churches and educational establishments can be found on this road.

Prominent landmarks include the Port Harcourt Cemetery, former office block of Ken Saro-Wiwa, St. Mary's Catholic Church and the Post Office.

== Education ==
- Banham Primary School
- St Mary's Catholic School

== Points of interest ==
- A branch of Finbank
- A branch of Keystone Bank
- A branch of Sterling Bank
- A branch of Skye Bank
- A branch of United Bank for Africa
