= Fritz Meier =

Swiss orientalist (1912–1998)

Fritz Meier (10 June, 1912- 10 June, 1998) was a Swiss Orientalist with a focus on Sufism.

== Life ==
Fritz Meier was born on 10 June 1912 in Basel. He grew up in the Canton of Basel-Landschaft and attended the Humanistisches Gymnasium. Beginning in 1932 he studied Greek philology, Semitics, and Assyriology at the University of Basel. He soon switched to Islamic studies and became a student of the Ottomanist and historian Rudolf Tschudi (1884-1960), under whose supervision he earned his doctorate, with a thesis on the life of the Sufi Abu Ishaq al-Kazaruni. In 1935 he followed Hellmut Ritter (1892-1971) to Istanbul, where he made his way to academic work. In 1963 he was habilitated. Meier was granted an honorary doctorate by the University of Tehran in 1974 and by the University of Freiburg in 1992. From 1986 on he was a corresponding member of the Heidelberg Academy of Sciences and Humanities.

His writings exerted a great deal of influence on the academic world. He wrote about the many forms of Islamic mysticism, Islamic manuscripts of the Persian and Arabic languages, the relationship between the Middle East and European cultural history, the history of religion in general, and popular culture.

His works on the great Persian mystic Abū-Sa'īd Abul-Khayr and the Persian poet Mahsati are considered some of the most comprehensive research available on the subjects. He died in Dornach on 10 June 1998.

== Works ==
- Die Vita des Scheich Abū Isḥāq al-Kāzarūnī. (Diss.) Bibliotheca Islamica, Leipzig 1948.
- Vom Wesen der islamischen Mystik. Basel 1943.
- Die Fawāʾiḥ al-ǧamāl wa-fawātiḥ al-ǧalāl des Naǧm ad-dīn al-Kubrā. Eine Darstellung mystischer Erfahrungen im Islam aus der Zeit um 1200 n. Chr. Wiesbaden 1957.
- Die schöne Mahsatī. Ein Beitrag zur Geschichte des persischen Vierzeilers. Wiesbaden 1963.
- Abū Saʿīd-i Abū l-Ḫayr. Wirklichkeit und Legende. Acta Iranica 11, Leiden 1976.
- Bahāʾ-i Walad. Grundzüge seines Lebens und seiner Mystik. Acta Iranica 27, Leiden 1989.
- Meister und Schüler im Orden der Naqšbandiyya. Universitatsverlag C. Winter, Heidelberg 1995.
- Bemerkungen zur Mohammedverehrung. Teil 1: Die Segenssprechung über Mohammed. Nachgelassene Schriften I, 1, Leiden 2002.
