= Central Cemetery of Tunja =

Cemetery in Boyacá Department, Colombia

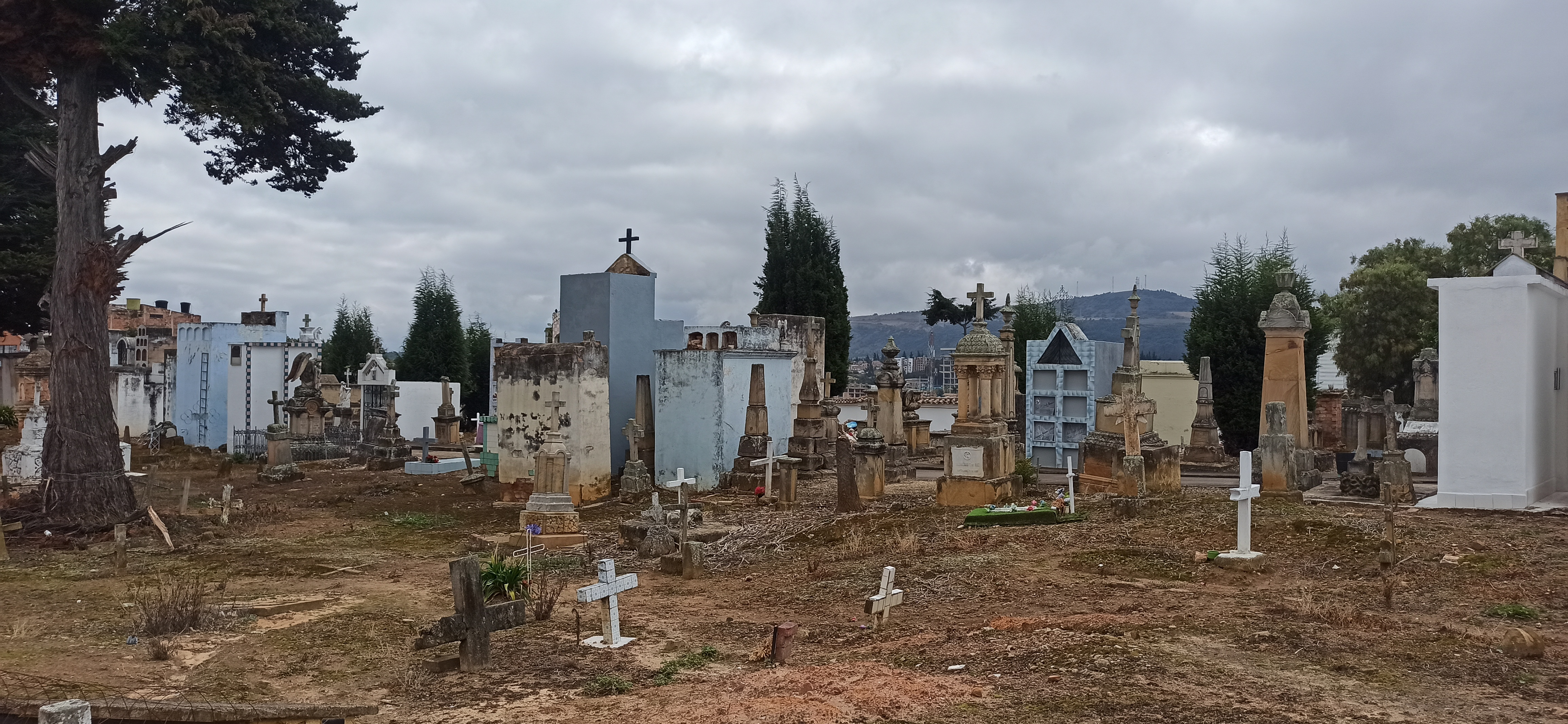

Details
- Established: 1828
- Location: Tunja
- Country: Colombia
- Coordinates: 5°32′21″N 73°21′27″W

The Central Cemetery of Tunja (Spanish: Cementerio Central de Tunja) is the most important cemetery in the city of Tunja, in Boyacá, Colombia, and considered one of the oldest in the country.

== History ==
The cemetery was built in 1828, and in 1930 the cement and brick vaults were added in the cemetery. The oldest part was created to be a pleasant green space for the dead; in the most modern part, the space between tombs is much smaller.

According to some scholars, the extensions and new constructions damaged the initial landscape, which is why they suggest that these gradually collapse until leaving the cemetery as it was originally, since it is considered a heritage asset according to the Colombian Land Management Plan.
