= List of total Commonwealth War Graves Commission burials by country =

The Commonwealth War Graves Commission (CWGC) is an intergovernmental organisation of six independent member states; United Kingdom, Canada, Australia, New Zealand, India, and South Africa, established through royal charter to mark, record and maintain the graves and places of commemoration of Commonwealth of Nations military forces killed during the two World Wars. In this capacity, the commission is responsible for the commemoration of 1.7 million Commonwealth servicemen and women in 150 countries worldwide.

Country	Burial grounds	Identified war graves	Unidentified war graves	Non-war graves	Commemorated on memorials
Albania	2	47	0	0	0
Algeria	13	2,041	122	71	0
Antigua	1	2	0	0	0
Argentina	2	15	0	3	0
Australia	877	11,454	14	7	1,037
Austria	2	583	16	58	0
Azerbaijan	0	0	0	0	47
Azores (PRT)	3	51	1	1	0
Bahamas	1	51	0	3	9
Bahrain	2	0	0	105	0
Bangladesh (Note: "India, Pakistan and Bangladesh have identical Memorials to the Missing in the Bombay and Chittagong 1939–1945 Memorials, each commemorating the same 6,470 casualties, and the Delhi and Karachi 1939–1945 Memorials, each commemorating the same 25,866 casualties. The statistics are quoted only within the commemoration figures for India.")	3	1,415	27	5	0
Barbados	9	23	0	0	0
Belgium	613	102,501	48,582	60	102,349
Belize	1	10	0	11	40
Bermuda (GBR)	12	140	0	2	0
Botswana	0	0	0	0	162
Brazil	5	25	0	1	0
British Indian Ocean Territory (GBR)	1	9	0	0	0
Bulgaria	2	240	3	12	0
Cameroon	3	47	0	4	0
Canada	2,814	14,299	11	1	4,127
Canary Islands (ESP)	1	1	0	1	0
Cape Verde	1	9	0	0	0
Chad	1	4	0	0	0
Chile	5	5	0	0	0
People's Republic of China (Note: Figure includes those buried or commemorated in Hong Kong.)	22	1,833	621	1,963	4,578
Republic of the Congo	1	29	0	0	0
Democratic Republic of the Congo	6	22	0	0	8
Costa Rica	1	1	0	0	0
Côte d'Ivoire	1	0	6	0	0
Croatia	2	2	0	2	0
Cuba	1	3	0	0	0
Cyprus	9	321	3	606	58
Czech Republic	2	223	34	0	0
Denmark	130	999	117	0	0
Djibouti	1	13	0	0	0
Dominica	2	3	0	0	0
Egypt	24	24,651	1,335	4,551	27,803
Equatorial Guinea	1	10	0	0	0
Eritrea	5	953	49	25	0
Estonia	2	15	0	1	0
Ethiopia	4	409	12	60	0
Falkland Islands (GBR)	1	33	0	21	0
Faroe Islands (DNK)	4	56	3	2	0
Fiji	2	75	0	3	34
France	2,919	356,967	116,460	481	217,829
Gambia	1	199	4	10	70
Germany	48	31,750	1,372	4,813	25
Ghana	7	612	3	57	1,220
Gibraltar (GBR)	2	653	2	1	98
Greece	31	12,397	2,361	1,101	5,667
Grenada	2	4	1	0	0
Guatemala	1	1	0	0	0
Guinea	2	2	0	0	0
Guyana	1	6	0	7	18
Honduras	1	1	0	0	0
Hungary	3	173	3	0	0
Iceland	6	232	2	8	0
India	23	10,995	521	203	51,150
Indonesia	6	2,605	657	10	444
Iran	1	551	13	14	3,588
Iraq	15	12,816	9,376	1,164	41,091
Republic of Ireland	658	2,939	53	15	156
Israel (Note: Figure includes those buried or commemorated in the State of Palestine.)	29	11,991	2,581	748	3,400
Italy	123	44,783	1,911	156	4,471
Jamaica	8	153	0	1	79
Japan	2	1,718	93	173	20
Jordan	1	0	0	32	0
Kenya (Note: "Tanzania and Kenya have identical Memorials to the Missing in the Dar es Salaam, the Mombasa and the Nairobi African Memorials, each commemorating the same 49,572 casualties. The statistics are quoted only within the commemoration figures for Tanzania.")	32	4,183	77	316	4,024
Latvia	1	32	4	0	0
Lebanon	5	1,705	12	9	0
Lesotho	0	0	0	0	1,001
Liberia	2	12	0	0	0
Libya	6	7,056	1,460	556	0
Lithuania	1	2	0	0	0
Luxembourg	8	26	0	0	0
Madagascar	1	311	3	0	0
Madeira (PRT)	1	6	0	1	0
Malawi	6	209	2	12	125
Malaysia	34	2,320	2,655	2,153	2,294
Maldives	0	0	0	0	70
Mali	2	3	0	0	0
Malta	13	3,376	9	3,689	2,350
Martinique (FRA)	1	1	0	0	0
Mauritania	1	5	0	0	0
Mauritius	4	37	0	74	57
Monaco	1	2	0	0	0
Morocco	5	61	2	7	0
Mozambique	6	185	7	1	93
Myanmar	5	10,945	1,107	12	26,902
Namibia	40	427	0	0	0
Nepal	1	1	0	0	0
Netherlands	476	18,265	1,262	11	1,035
Netherlands Antilles (NED)	3	11	0		0
New Caledonia (FRA)	1	242	4		449
New Zealand	435	2,909	1		569
Nigeria	32	983	29		3,669
Norfolk Island (AUS)	1	4	0		0
North Macedonia	1	118	6	0	0
Norway	74	955	193		0
Oman	4	2	0		0
Pakistan	2	999	0		569
Panama	1	15	0		0
Papua New Guinea	7	6,145	1,645		2,284
Peru	1	6	0		0
Philippines	2	2	0		0
Poland	3	1,131	54		44
Portugal	5	51	0		0
Puerto Rico (USA)	1	2	0		0
Romania	3	170	8		0
Russia	5	365	4		243
Samoa	1	12	0		0
San Marino	1	2	0		0
Saudi Arabia	1	1	0		0
Senegal	2	23	0		0
Serbia	3	494	16		0
Seychelles	1	76	0		289
Sierra Leone	4	444	9		1,391
Singapore	4	4,458	858		24,675
Society Islands (FRA)	1	4	0		0
Solomon Islands	1	5	0		0
Somalia (Note: Figure includes those buried or commemorated in the Somaliland.)	2	280	22		317
South Africa	591	8,311	20		130
Spain	19	108	6		0
Sri Lanka	11	1,653	11		344
Saint Kitts and Nevis	1	2	0		0
Saint Helena and Ascension (GBR)	2	21	2		0
Saint Lucia	1	44	0		0
Saint Vincent	5	18	0		0
Sudan	1	395	0		1,346
Swaziland	1	0	0		77
Sweden	11	149	47		0
Switzerland	1	136	0		0
Syria	2	1,274	132		10
Tanzania	12	3,271	87		51,655
Thailand	2	6,323	188		11
Togo	1	1	0		0
Tonga	2	3	0		0
Trinidad and Tobago	1	105	0		40
Tunisia	11	7,750	810		1,954
Turkey	37	9,487	13,461		27,161
Uganda	10	373	2		127
Ukraine	1	1	0		0
United Kingdom (Note: Figure includes those buried or commemorated on the Isle of Man and the Channel Islands.)	12,359	171,027	1,401		133,119
United States	471	992	4		0
Uruguay	1	8	1		0
Vanuatu	1	2	0		0
Venezuela	1	1	0		0
Yemen	1	296	3		76
Zambia	1	70	0		661
Zimbabwe	21	542	8		132
