= Scottish Cemetery at Calcutta =

Scottish Cemetery
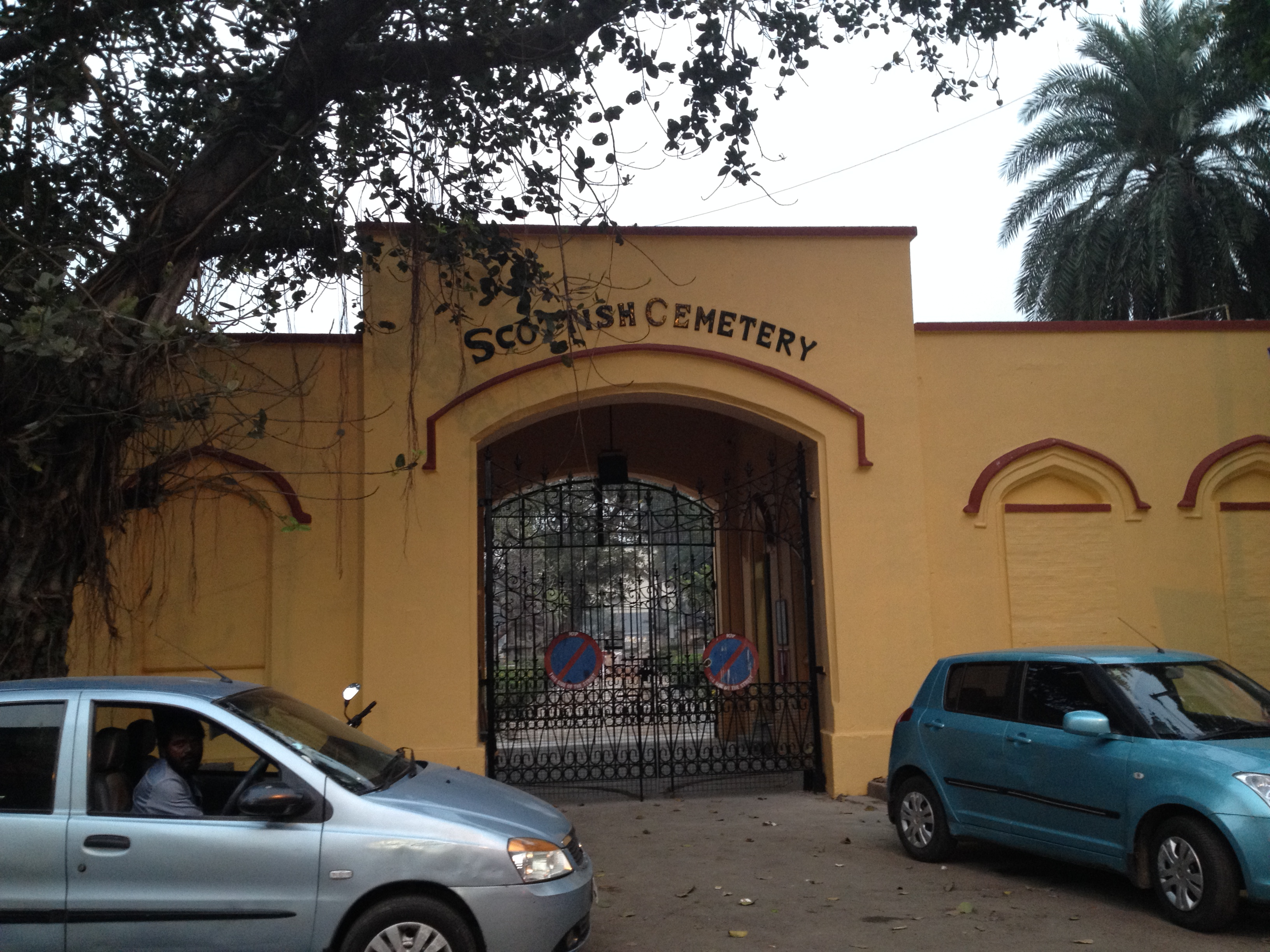
- Main entrance of the Scottish Cemetery
- Interactive map of Scottish Cemetery

Details
- Established: 1820; 206 years ago
- Location: Karaya Road, Mullick Bazar, Kolkata, West Bengal 700017
- Country: India
- Coordinates: 22.5448°N 88.3626°E
- Type: Private (closed)
- Owned by: St. Andrew's Church, Kolkata
- Size: 3 acres (1.2 ha)
- No. of graves: 1,809
- No. of interments: 4,000
- Website: readinggamesplayingbooks.com/scots/

The Scottish Cemetery at Calcutta was established in 1820 catering to the specific needs of the large Scottish population in the Kolkata area. These Scots, including soldiers, missionaries, jute traders and businessmen, were attached to numerous enterprises in the area such as the headquarters of the East India Company, and the administration of the British India, whose capital was here. The cemetery was utilised until the 1940s but was abandoned in the 1950s and neglected following India's independence. Well over 90% of those buried bear recognisably Scots names such as Anderson, McGregor, Campbell and Ross. Around 10% are Bengali.

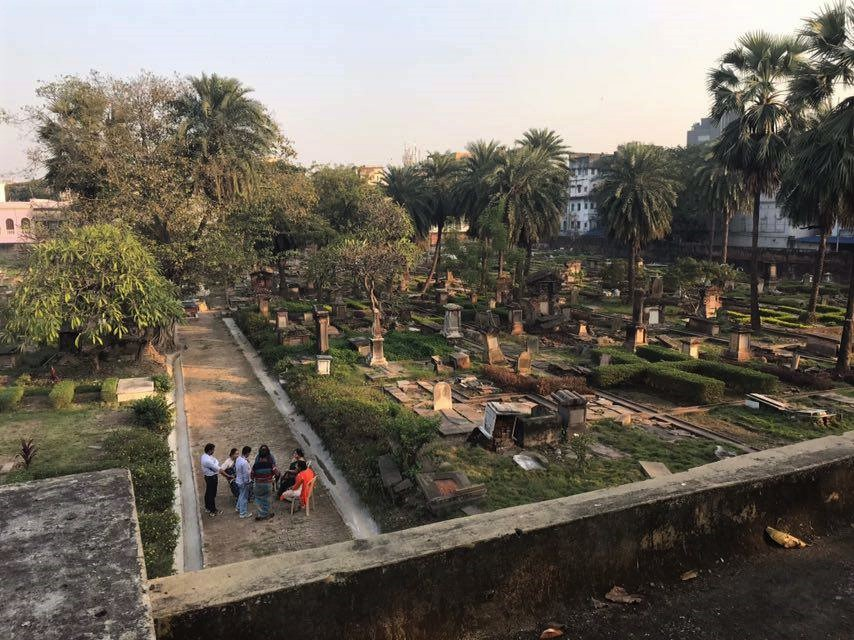

== Description ==
Extending to 3 acres (12,000 m^{2}) the cemetery lies within the dense urban area on Karaya Bazar Road. It is roughly square in plan and is laid out largely in a grid pattern, but with more random tombs closest to the road, in the oldest, south-west section. It contains over 1809 burial plots, with at least 2000 burials. The entrance, which bears the title "Scottish Cemetery" over an archway is flanked by a gatehouse. The entire cemetery is enclosed by a high wall.

Stones are generally of Scottish sandstone or granite. Since they bear inscriptions of their makers or sculptors, it is possible to assess that almost all have been made in Scotland and transported here for use. Apart from the indigenous Indian plant life, and buildings beyond the perimeter, the cemetery has a strong Scots character. Almost all original lead (used in lettering) and cast iron, was systematically removed in the second half of the 20th century.

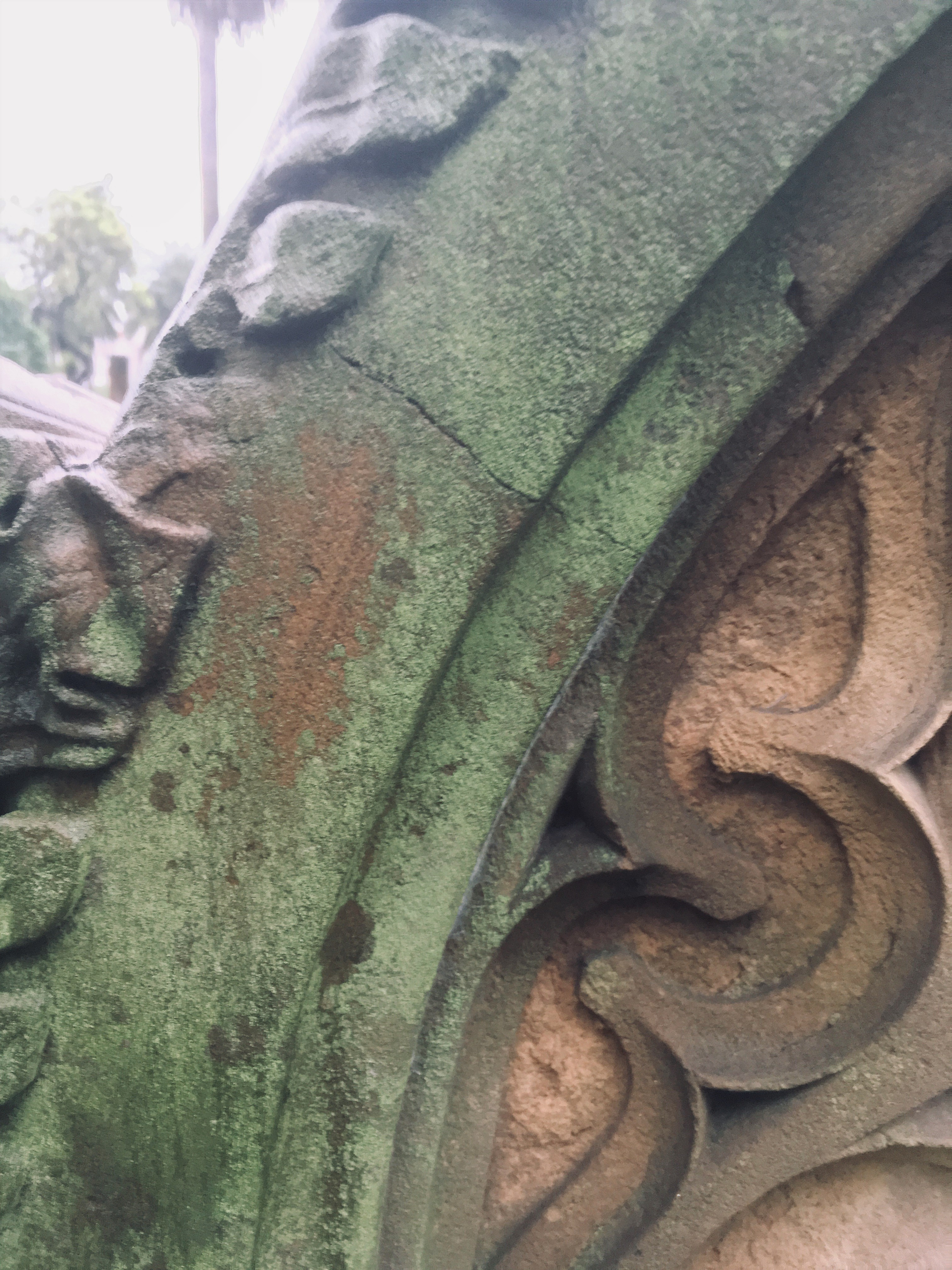

== Restoration ==
The Scottish Cemetery contains 1,809 headstones and monuments and around 4,000 burials. Although its use continued after Indian Independence (1947) it fell into disrepair in the 1970s. In 2008 the Kolkata Scottish Heritage Trust (KSHT), Scotland, was established to restore the cemetery. The project is run by a board of trustees operating as a registered Scottish charity via a Memorandum of Understanding with the site owner, St. Andrew’s Church. KSHT raises funds from private donors, charitable trusts and foundations.

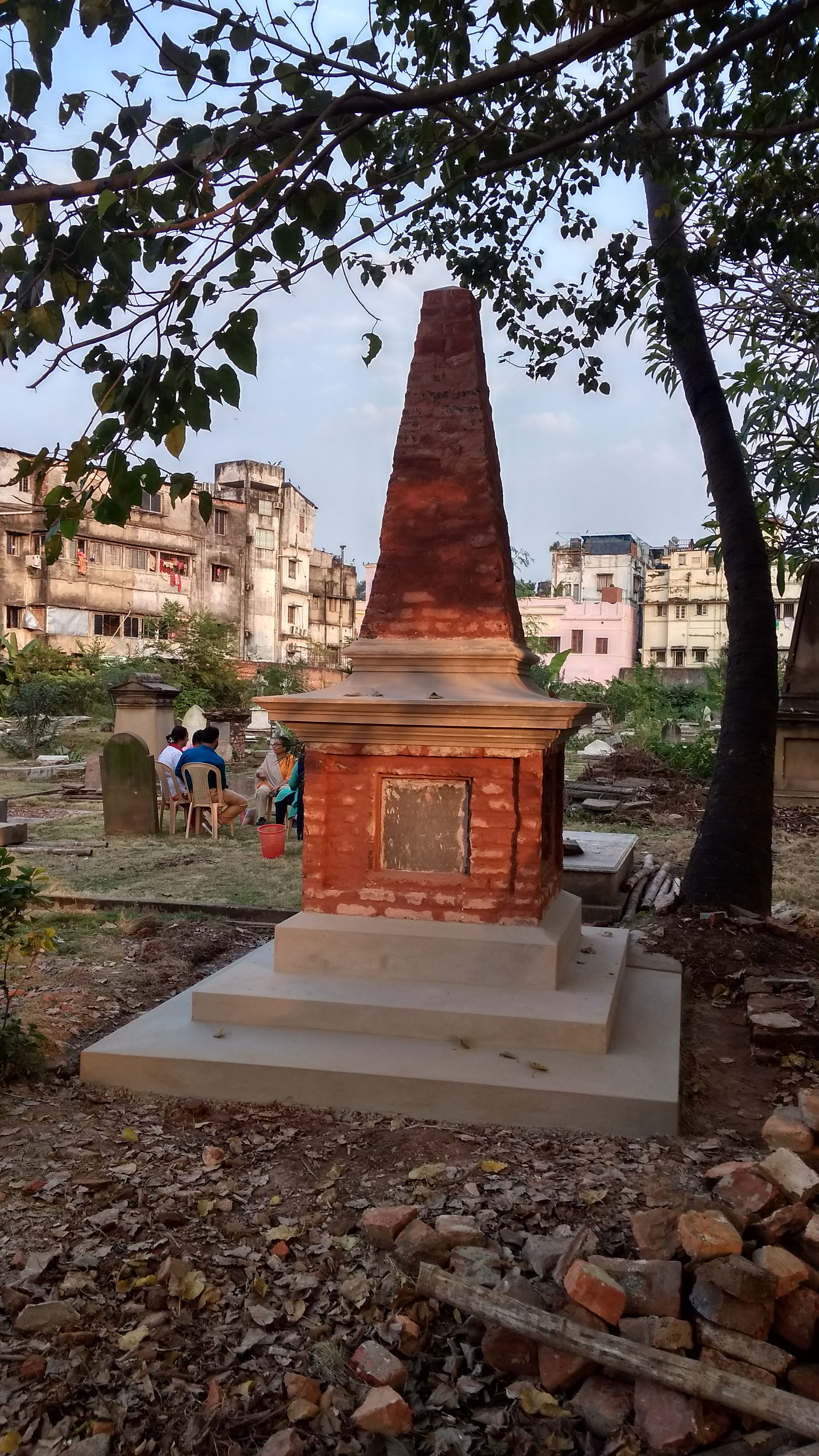

Conservation of the Scottish Cemetery aims to improve the environment, built landscape, and the quality of lives of the people connected with it, through optimum use of local and sustainable resources, maintaining an ecological balance, and preserving history and cultural values. The development processes take into account the current needs of the times without compromising the ability of future generations to do the same. The project has at its core the interests of history, ecology, and people.

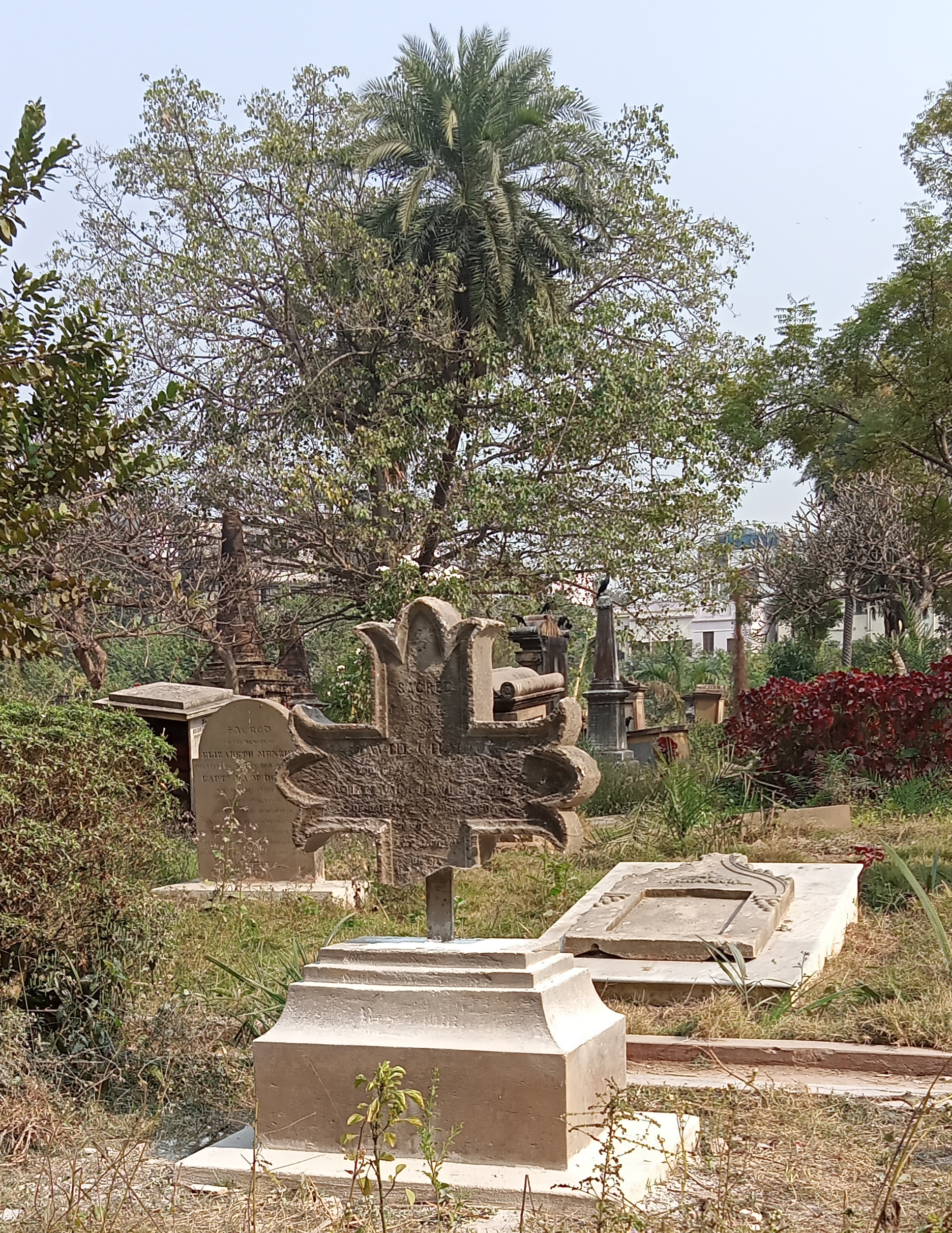

The Scottish Cemetery is an important repository of memory containing thousands of detailed burial records. This data is providing a rich source for research into the growth and world-wide impact of the Scottish diaspora in the nineteenth century. Its urban parkland setting offers the dense city not only a much needed ‘green lung’ but also encourages tourism especially related to genealogy. Since the cemetery is surrounded by a neglected urban precinct populated by under-privileged families, the project runs a community development program for the neighbourhood.

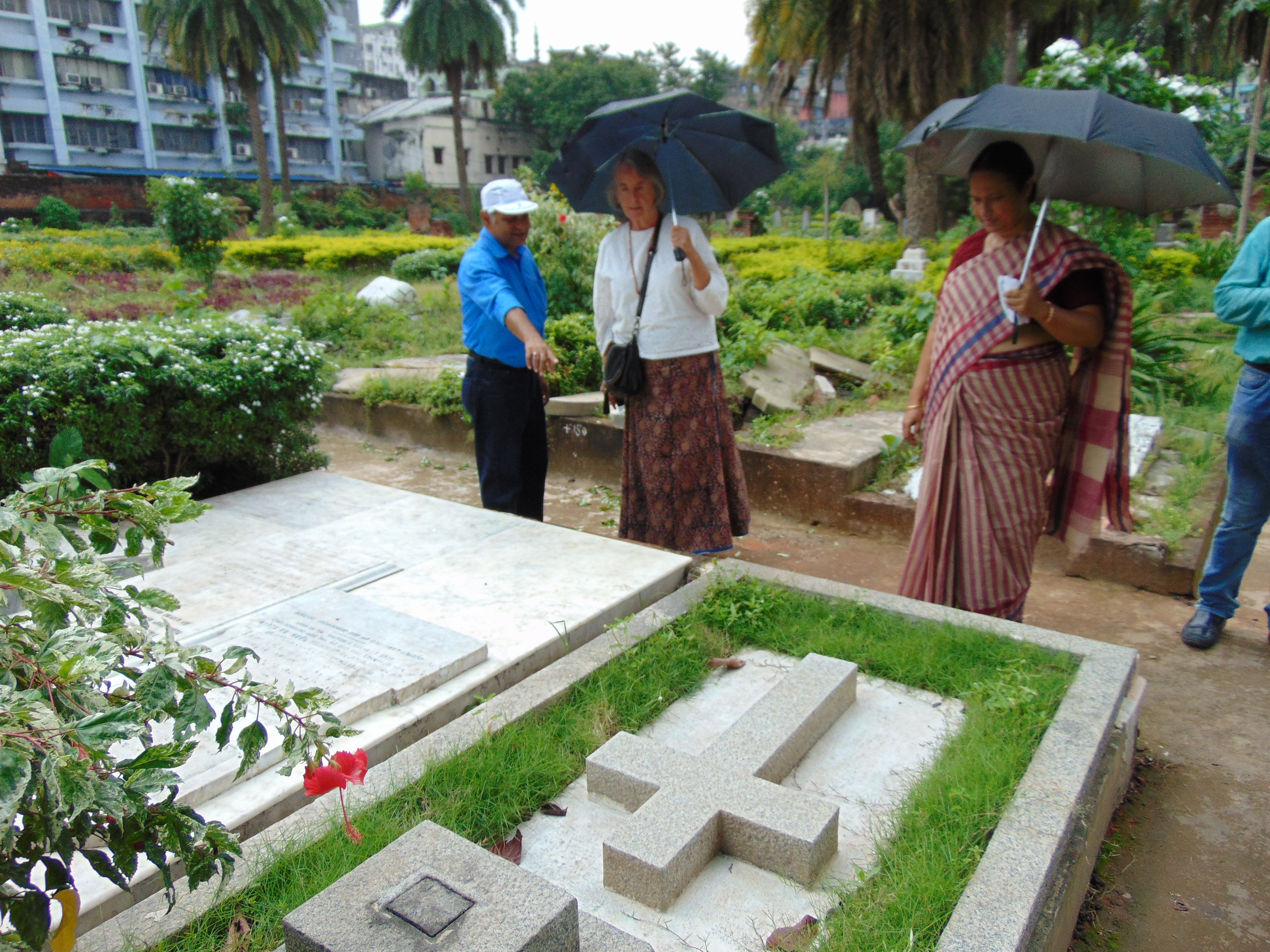

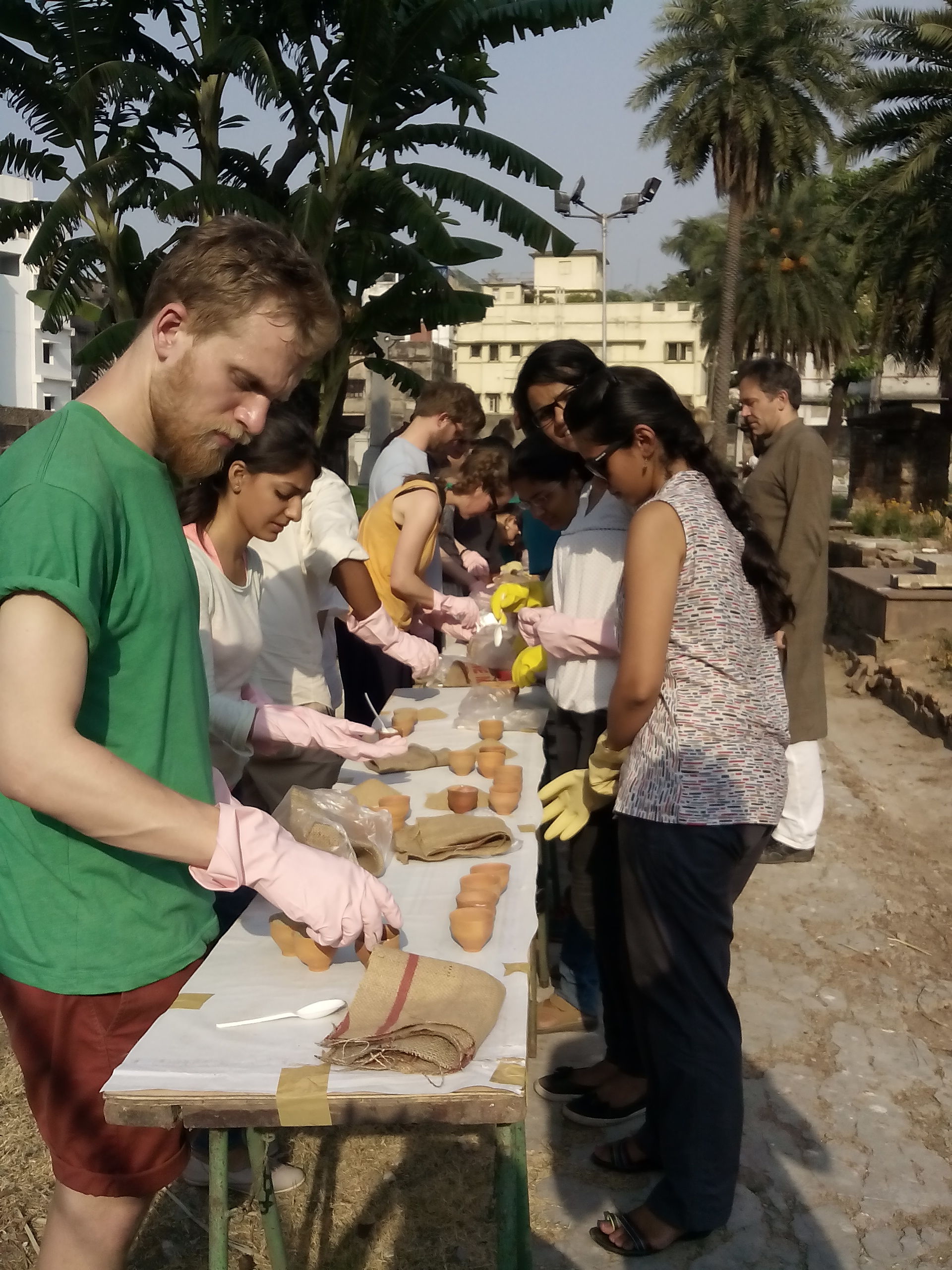

Kolkata lies along the river Hooghly in the eastern Gangetic delta, and supports a segment of Bengal’s diverse ecology. It is categorized by heavy rainfall in a humid, tropical climate and a variety of regional flora & fauna that include remaining sections of monsoon-type forests (or moist, deciduous forests). The city’s landform contains pockets of rainwater collected within dense, clayey soils; old growth trees, bamboo forests, palm plantations and wetland ecosystems together create the designed and natural landscape. Although these landforms are disappearing as a result of development pressures, several important ecological sites – such as the Scottish Cemetery – survive as protected spaces within the urban environment.

Following the cemetery’s disuse in the 1970s the site reverted to a natural state. The city grew and continued to develop around it, but the 3-acre site remained untouched and became a habitat for several indigenous endemic and threatened species which together form a rich biodiversity of microbes, plants and animals along with preserved sections of semi-aquatic grassland and forested ecosystems. In parallel with the conservation of historic monuments, the cemetery’s natural heritage is being preserved as a priority of the landscape plan, as urban parkland and as a biodiversity conservation park. This will provide several conservation benefits such as reduced air and noise pollution, replenishing of groundwater, and the conservation of soil, flora and fauna that will promote mitigation of climate change.

== Graves of note ==
- Dr. James Meik, Esq. Senior member of the Medical Board of Bengal. Surgeon in H. M. Army in Calcutta, East India Company on the Bengal, India Establishment. Birth: Jan 10 1758. Death: Apr 25 1837
- Thomas Jones 1810-1849, a Welsh missionary
- The director of the Calcutta Zoological Gardens
- Numerous officers of the East India Company.
- James Wheatley, a police constable "murdered in the execution of his duty" in 1844
- Rev. John Adam, "late missionary to the heathen".
- John Reddie FRSE (1805-1851) judge

Towns of origin mentioned on the various stones include Paisley, Broughty Ferry, Sutherlandshire, Fife, Campbeltown, and many from Dundee (the latter largely linked to the jute industry).

== Scottish archive material ==
A photographic album held in the Dundee archives holds photographs of 25 individual graves, taken in the mid 20th century. These 25 were re-recorded in 2008, giving evidence of the intervening decay.

Recently, Presidency University has created a digital archive of the graves in the cemetery from its foundation to the beginning of the Raj (1858) and this can be accessed at http://scotscemeteryarchivekolkata.com/,

== Sources ==
- Kolkata Scottish Heritage Trust, Scotland (https://find-and-update.company-information.service.gov.uk/company/SC344642/officers)
