= Rudolf Tschudi =

Swiss orientalist and philologist

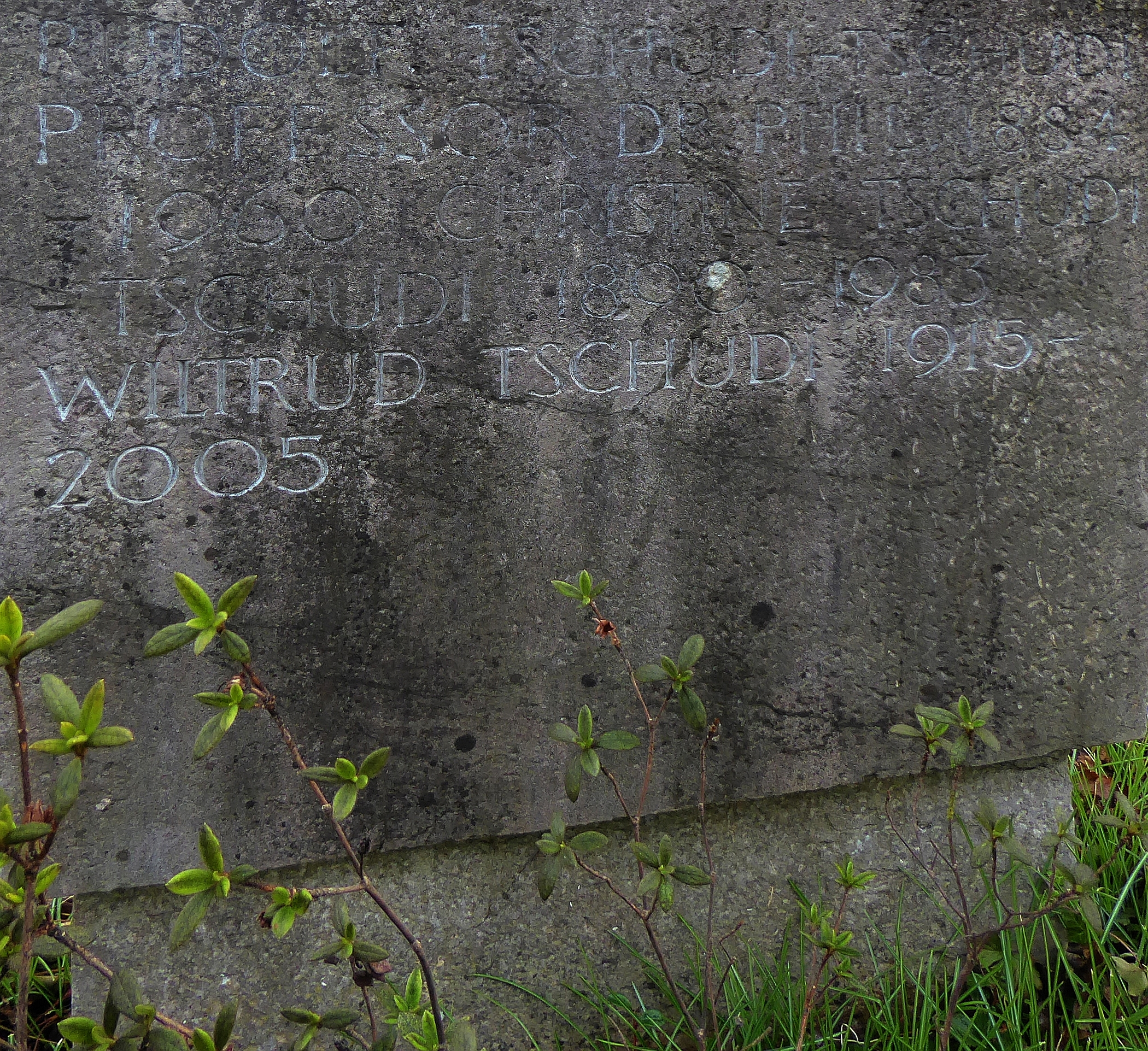
Family grave at the Hörnli cemetery, Riehen, Basel-Stadt

Rudolf Tschudi (2 May 1884 – 11 October 1960) was a Swiss philologist, historian and Orientalist.

== Life ==
Tschudi was born on 2 May 1884 in Glarus. He studied classical philology (Greek and Latin) as well as eastern philology in Basel, Erlangen (where he studied under Georg Jacob), and Tübingen and was a member of the Schwizerhüsli Basel, Erlanger, and Tübingen Wingolf fraternities. He then became an assistant professor in 1910 and a professor at the Hamburgisches Kolonialinstitut in 1914.

In 1919 he came to Zürich as an associate professor, and finally in 1922 to Ordinarius in Basel. Fritz Meier was among his students. Tschudi was co-editor of the book series "Turkish Library" (Türkische Bibliothek, published by Mayer & Müller in Berlin) and the magazine "Der Islam." His specialty was the Ottoman Empire and Turkish literature.

Tschudi died on 11 October 1960 in Basel.

== Bibliography ==
- Tschudi, Rudolf in German, French and Italian in the online Historical Dictionary of Switzerland.
- W. Behn, Concise biographical companion to Index Islamicus 3, 2004, 539.
- Rudolf Tschudi in the Basel University Library
