= Agaram Cemetery =

British cemetery in Bangalore, Karnataka, India

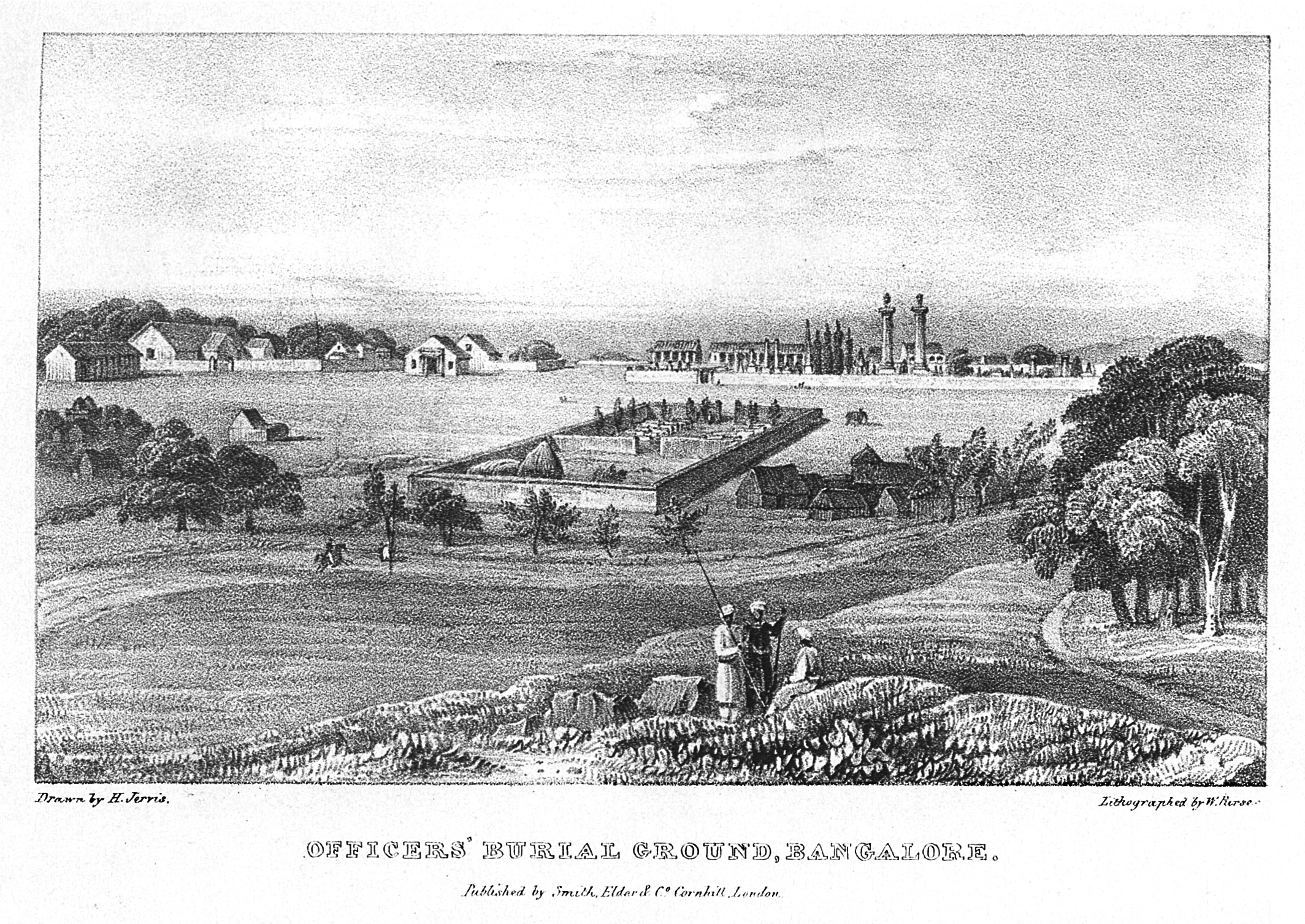
- An 1834 illustration of the cemetery from the parade grounds (near Mahatma Gandhi Road)
- Interactive map of Agaram Cemetery

Details
- Established: 1808; 218 years ago
- Location: Bangalore, Karnataka
- Country: India
- Coordinates: 12.967335°N 77.618007°E

The Agaram Cemetery is an old Protestant cemetery in Bangalore, Karnataka, India. Located inside the land of the Army Service Corps and behind the Army Officers Mess, it is the oldest Christian cemetery in Bangalore and is not publicly accessible. The oldest grave from 1808 is that of Sgt. Major Kelly, HM 59th Regiment of Foot. Two 40 foot ionic columns commemorate officers of His Majesty's 13th Light Dragoons. The cemetery was used until 1870. The cemetery was overgrown and was partly restored through the activism of Admiral Oscar Stanley Dawson.
