= Cemitério de Vila Formosa =

Cemetery in São Paulo, Brazil

Vila Formosa Cemetery
- Interactive map of Vila Formosa Cemetery

Details
- Established: 20 May 1949; 77 years ago
- Location: Vila Formosa, São Paulo
- Country: Brazil
- Coordinates: 23°33′50″S 46°31′39″W
- Find a Grave: Vila Formosa Cemetery

The Cemitério de Vila Formosa (Vila Formosa Cemetery) is a necropolis located in the East End district of Vila Formosa, in the city of São Paulo, Brazil. It is Latin America's largest cemetery.

Created on 20 May 1949, (the first burials took place on August 26, 1949) the cemetery has an area of 780,000 square meters (about 192.74 acres), where more than 1.5 million people have been buried to date. It is a space used in particular for burials of poor people and those from the lower middle classes.

Divided into two wings, each month it carries out an average of 275 burials. With eight rooms for open casket visitation, the Vila Formosa cemetery has three entrances.

This cemetery occupies the fourth largest green area in São Paulo, only being smaller than Parque Anhangüera, Parque Ibirapuera and Parque do Carmo, thus representing an important green area for the areas east of São Paulo.
