= Irène Zurkinden =

Swiss painter

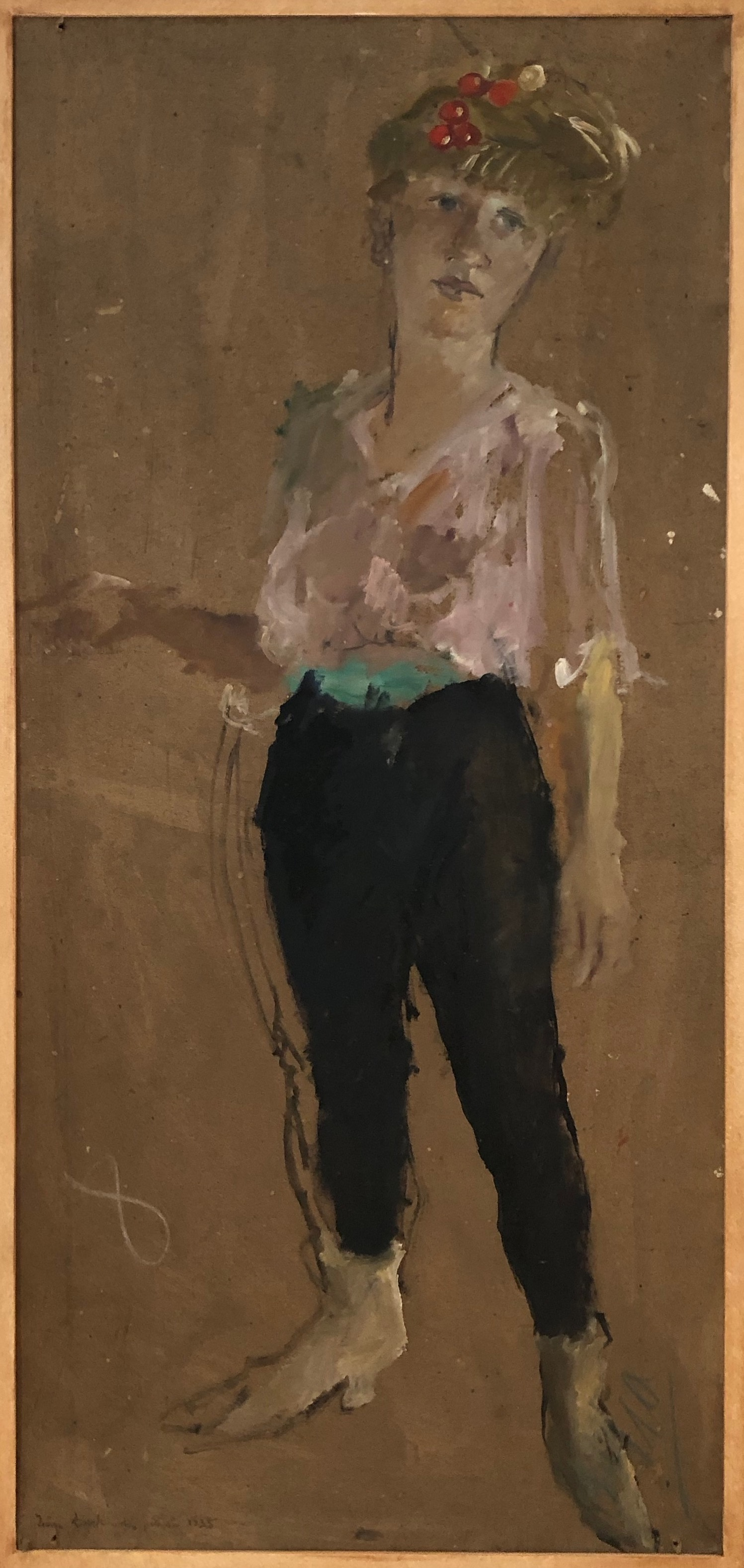
Irène Zurkinden: Self-portrait. (Paris 1935)

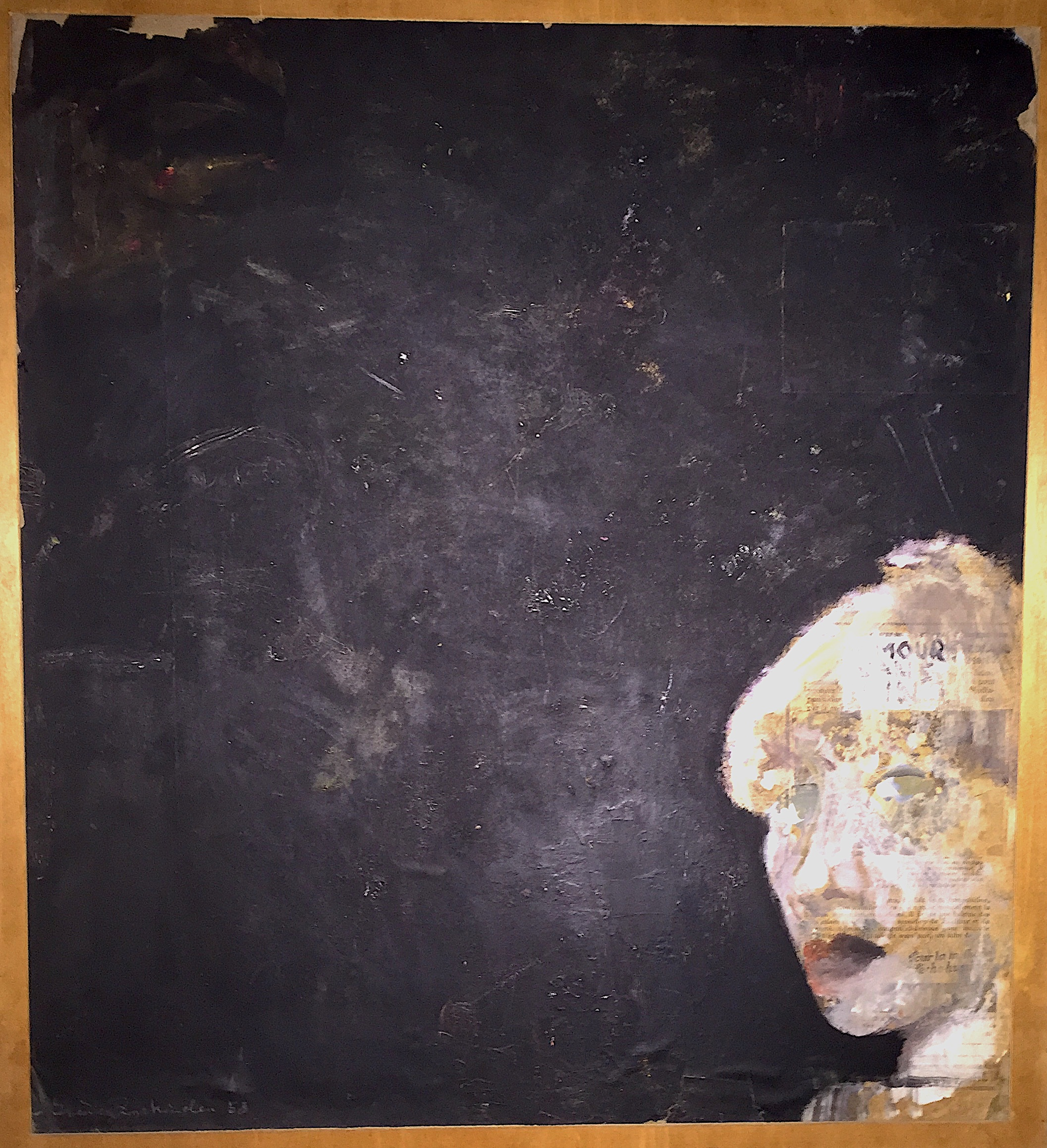
Irène Zurkinden: Self-portrait. (1932 Tempera sur papier journal)

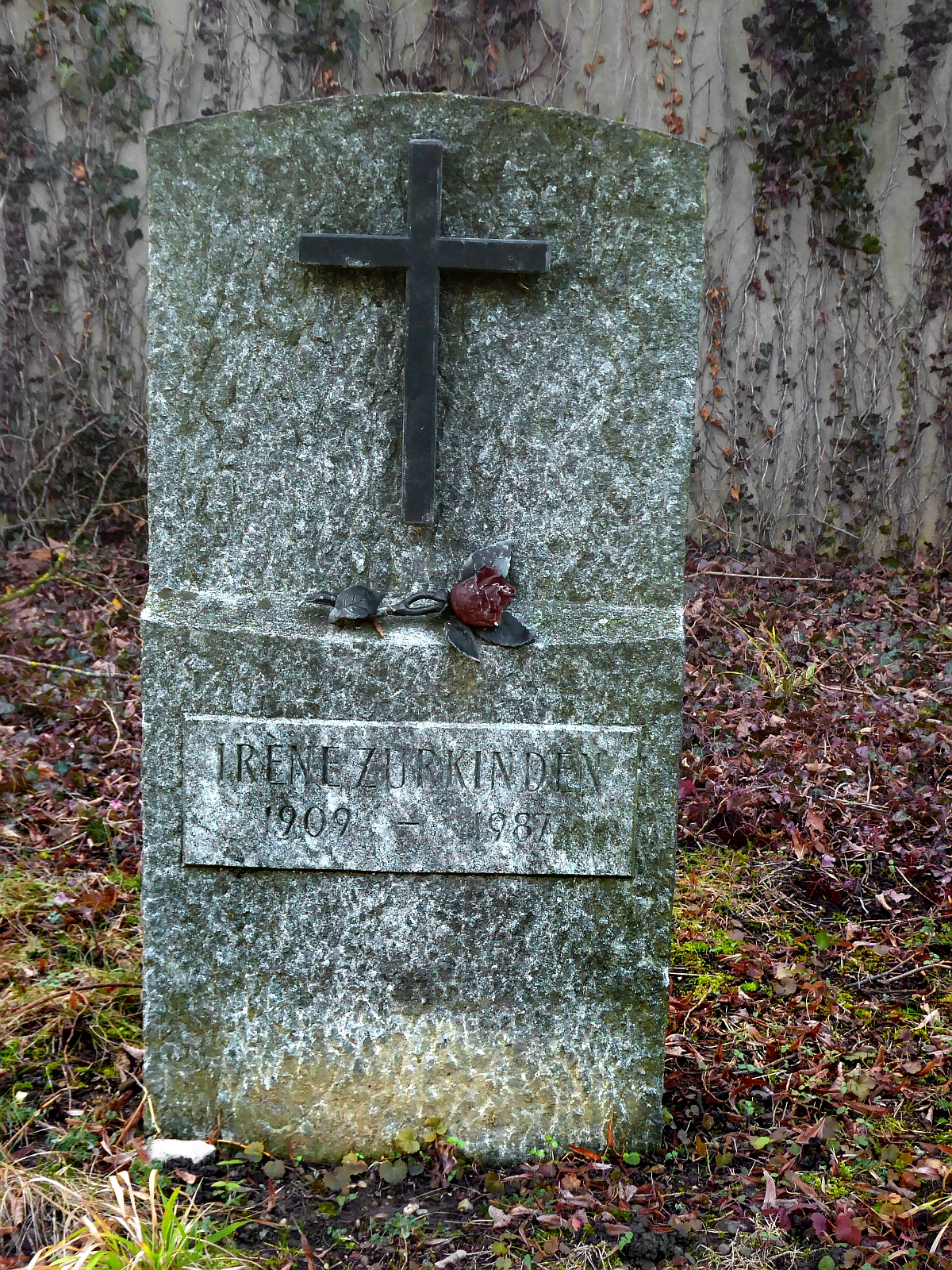
Irène Zurkinden's gravestone

Irène Zurkinden (December 11, 1909 – December 27, 1987) was a Swiss painter.

== Life and achievements ==
Irène Zurkinden spent her childhood in Basel and Münchenstein. Her father was a customs officer from Fribourg, her mother Jeanne was a dance instructor. Irène's family was very open-minded and allowed the adolescent who wanted to become a fashion illustrator to enroll at Basel's art school in 1925. There, Irène Zurkinden attended drawing classes with Albrecht Mayer (1875–1952), studied color theory under Arnold Fiechter (1879–1943) and graphic arts under Fritz Baumann (1886–1942). Until she got her degree in 1929, she produced mainly portrait drawings.

That year, Irène Zurkinden made her first trip to Paris, where she continued her education for a few months at the Académie de la Grande Chaumière. In 1932, she spent a couple of months in the French capital with Meret Oppenheim, a friend since around 1927/28. In the years following her graduating, Ms. Zurkinden began painting more scenic cityscapes in a style clearly influenced by Impressionism. During this time, she lived alternately in Paris and Basel, where she earned herself a reputation as a popular portrait artist. From 1932 to 1972, the artist had an annual exhibition in the Gallery of Marguerite Schulthess in Basel's Aeschenvorstadt. After Marguerite Schulthess's death, Ms. Zurkinden became a fixture of Basel's Gallery Riehentor, whose owner Trudl Bruckner was a founding member of ART Basel. In 1980, the Beyeler Gallery in Basel's Bäumleingasse presented the artist in a solo exhibition.

In 1934, Irène Zurkinden met jazz musician Kurt Fenster, the son of a Brazilian circus artist and a German mother. During the Nazi dictatorship, Fenster emigrated to Paris. The couple lived for several years in the French capital. At the outbreak of World War 2, Irène Zurkinden returned to Switzerland. Her sons Nicolas (Kolka) (*1937) and Stephan (*1943) from her relationship with Kurt Fenster grew up with their mother in Basel.

From 1942, Irène Zurkinden participated in the exhibitions of Group 33. During the second half of the 1930s and the early 1940s, she produced works inspired by surrealism. In 1985, the Kunstmuseum Basel honored her with a comprehensive retrospective of her work.

Autumn 2023 Meredith Rosen / New York organized a single show much talked about in the media. The following year Rosen presented the artist at ART Basel .

2025 Kulturstiftung Basel H.Geiger / KBHG honored Zurkinden with a retrospective focusing on drawings and never seen before sketchbooks starting in 1932.

Hauser&Wirth presents the artist at Basel Kunststage 2026 in a solo exhibition.

After World War 2, Irène Zurkinden lived in Basel and Paris and made long trips to Morocco (1948), Spain (1950/51) and Italy (1952/53). In those years, she designed costumes and sets for the Stadttheater Basel and increasingly worked on book illustrations.

== Awards and commemoration ==
- In 1978 she was honored in her childhood home, receiving the Sperber-Kollegium "Ehrespalebärglemer" award.
- In 1986 she was awarded the Basel Cultural Award.
- The city of Basel honored the artist in 2014 by naming a tree-lined public square "Irène Zurkinden Square". It is a new traffic junction at the planned Dreispitz high-rise.

== Works ==
- Autoportrait en chapeau de paille, 1929, LM, C. Bernoulli, Basel
- Porträt Paul Sacher, o. J., Privatbesitz
- Meret à l'orange, 1932–1935, Kunstmuseum Basel
- Pariser Dächer, 1934, Öffentliche Kunstsammlung Basel-Stadt
- Dialogue muet sur le bonheur, 1936, Privatsammlung
- Le cirque du monde, o. J., Privatsammlung Riehen
- Interieur mit geschmücktem Weihnachtsbaum, 1939, Merian-Iselin-Spital, Basel
- La gare d'Agen (Lot et Garonne), 1940, Privatbesitz
- Ballet lugubre, 1942, Privatbesitz
- Friedhof in Paris, um 1950, Privatbesitz Barcelona
- Rêve: Cocteau mène la danse, 1962, Privatbesitz
- Paris, Gare Montparnasse, 1966, Sammlung Hotel "Les Trois Rois", Basel
- Filles maboules sur boules, 1975, Privatbesitz
- Park in Paris, 1985, Privatbesitz

== Book illustrations ==
- Hans Christian Andersen: Die Schneekönigin. Märchen in sieben Geschichten mit fünf Farblithografien von Irène Zurkinden. Bern o. J. (ca. 1950)
- Colette: Die Freundin. Franz. Original La Seconde (erschienen 1931), ins Deutsche übertragen von Waltrud Kappeler und Louis Erlacher, mit Illustrationen von Irène Zurkinden, Zürich 1956
- Helen Vischer: Anmutig heiteres Lob und literarisches Denkmal für die Stadt Basel. Zürich 1956
- Maud Frère: Einsames Herz. Franz. Original La Grenouille, ins Deutsche übertragen von Marguerite Janson mit Illustrationen von Irène Zurkinden, Zürich 1962
- Barbey d'Aurevilly: Le rideau cramoisi. Mit elf Lithografien von Irène Zurkinden, Lausanne 1970
- Hermann Schneider: Der Mann mit dem Hifthorn. Basel o. J. (ca. 1971)
- Johann Wolfgang von Goethe: Aus den Memoiren des Marshalls von Bassompierre. Mit sieben Federzeichnungen von Irène Zurkinden, Basel 1974

== Literature ==
- Irène Zurkinden Love. Life. KBHG / Hatje-Cantz Berlin ISBN 978-3-7757-6073-7

- Christian Geelhaar: Irène Zurkinden. Kunstmuseum Basel, 1985.
- Simone Gojan: Irène Zurkinden. In: Andreas Kotte (Hrsg.): Theaterlexikon der Schweiz. Band 3, Chronos, Zürich 2005, ISBN 3-0340-0715-9, p. 2165.
- Hans-Joachim Müller: Irène Zurkinden. Friedrich Reinhardt AG, 2006 ISBN 3-7245-1422-0.References
- This article was initially translated from the German Wikipedia page.
