= Ibadan Military Cemetery =

Cemetery in Nigeria

- Interactive map of Ibadan Military Cemetery

Details
- Location: Jericho district of Ibadan
- Country: Nigeria
- Coordinates: 7°23′50″N 3°51′52″E

Ibadan Military Cemetery is situated in the Jericho district of Ibadan, Nigeria. Many burials are from the Second World War

The graveyard has the cross of sacrifice at the centre, with 8 denominational plots where the graves are distributed.

According to the Commonwealth War Graves Commission (CWGC)], the cemetery contains the graves of 137 Commonwealth victims of Second World War, 8 Foreign National burials and 17 non-world war burials.
