= La Llamita Cemetery =

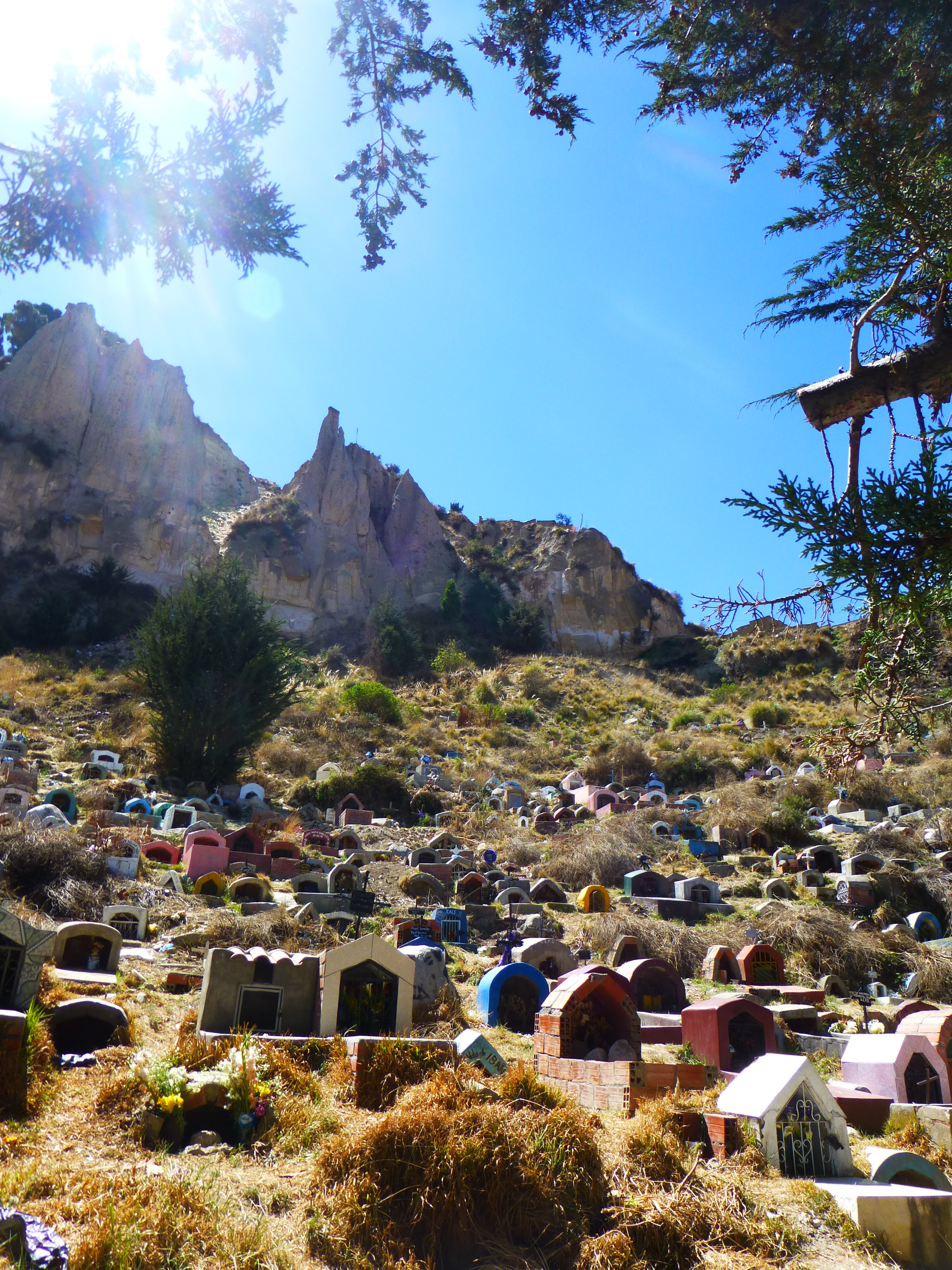
- Interactive map of La Llamita Cemetery

Details
- Location: La Paz
- Country: Bolivia
- Coordinates: 16°29′49″S 68°09′06″W
- Type: Popular tourist

The La Llamita Cemetery (Cementerio La Llamita) is a cemetery located in the Periférica macro district, in the Agua de la Vida Norte area of northern La Paz, Bolivia. It is considered clandestine because it is not under the custody of the municipal government of that city. In 2017, a revitalization and recovery project was planned.

== History ==
The residents of the neighborhood point out that in the mid-eighties, the La Llamita Cemetery was already established, and graves from 1974 can be found on the site.

== Characteristics ==
The La Llamita Cemetery was established by the inhabitants of the surrounding sectors, until 2017, it did not have direct municipal administration although maintenance work was carried out jointly with the neighbors. Some of the problems of the cemetery were the lack of control over burials, graves without registration related to criminal actions, the establishment of alcoholics in the vicinity, lack of water and maintenance, as well as a lack of lighting. During the construction of one of the stations of the orange line of Mi Teleférico, tree pruning work was carried out.

== Individual graves ==
The cemetery occupies a plot of land on a medium slope and has graves on the natural ground with small niches to place flowers for the deceased. The land is privately owned and managed by the neighborhood council.
