= Great Cemetery of Kuopio =

Cemetery in Kuopio, Finland

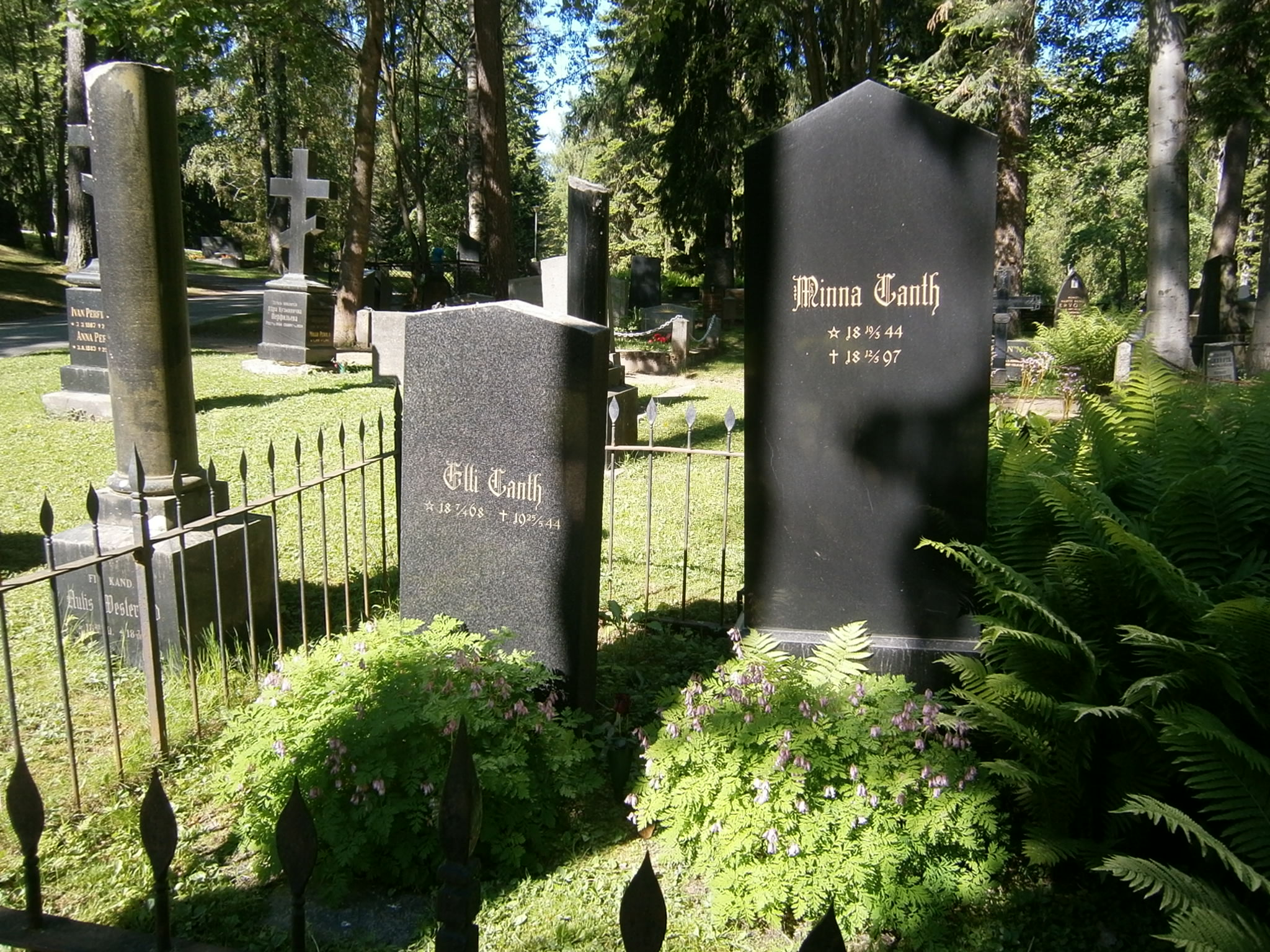
- Grave of Minna Canth
- Interactive map of Great Cemetery of Kuopio

Details
- Established: 1867
- Location: Puijo, Kuopio
- Country: Finland
- Coordinates: 62°53′53.52″N 27°40′18.48″E
- Type: Public
- Website: Iso hautausmaa - Kuopion seurakunnat

The Great Cemetery of Kuopio (Finnish: Kuopion Iso hautausmaa) is a large cemetery located in the Puijo district in Kuopio, Finland. The cemetery was founded in 1867 and has been expanded several times in the 20th century. The cemetery is located in the area of Kuopio Cathedral Parish and is also known as the Kuopio City Parish Cemetery. The cemetery is bordered on the south by the Kouvola–Iisalmi railway, on the west by the Blessing Chapels along Karjalankatu and the building of the Finnish Orthodox Church Museum and Ecclesiastical Government, on the north by the Highway 5, and on the east by Puijonkatu street.

The cemetery has a graveyard of various faiths established in the early 20th century, in which the Eastern Orthodox population is buried; the cemetery also has a burial place for Russian soldiers – the Cossacks of Don – and a memorial chapel built for it in 1912. Perhaps the most famous person buried in the cemetery is Minna Canth, Finnish writer and social activist.

According to the Finnish Heritage Agency, the Great Cemetery and the Heroes' Park located in the center, in the Multimäki district, represent Finnish cemetery culture in a nationally significant way.
