= Markus Mattmüller =

Swiss historian (1928–2003)

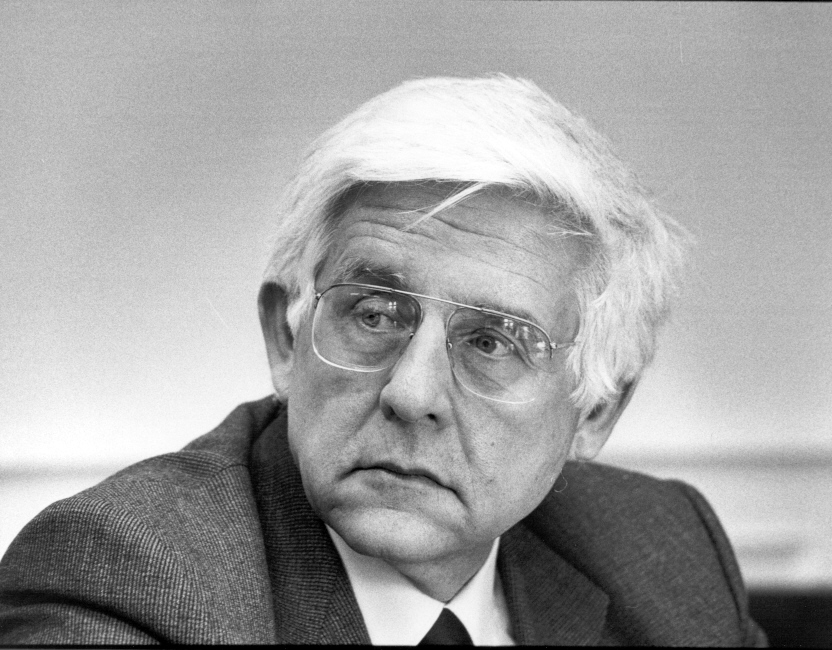
Markus Mattmüller in 1988.

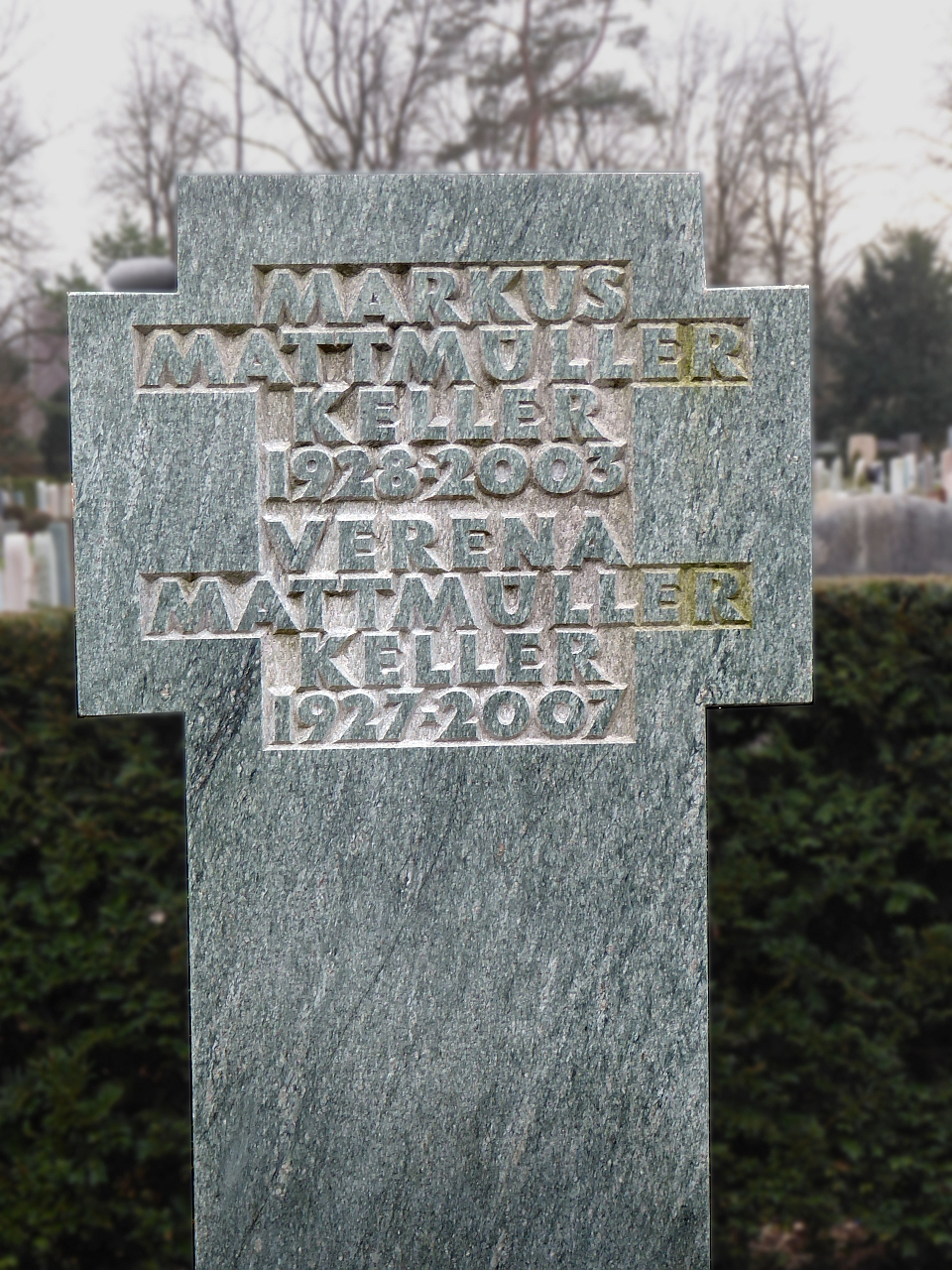
Mattmüller's grave at Cemetery am Hörnli, Riehen.

Markus Theodor Mattmüller (18 July 1928 in Basel–30 October 2003 in Basel; originally from Basel) was a Swiss historian.

== Biography ==
He was the son of pacifist activist Georg Mattmüller (1893–1951). He studied history as well as German and Italian language and literature at the universities of Basel and Perugia before he passed the Mittellehrerexamen in 1957. He qualified as a professor in 1966. From 1969 to 1992, he was an ordinary professor of General and Swiss Modern History at the University of Basel.

He was one of the pioneering social historians of German-speaking Switzerland alongside Rudolf Braun and Erich Gruner. Among other things, he oversaw research works on demography and agricultural history of the Ancien Régime, as well as on the labour movement. He also produced work on Leonhard Ragaz and religious socialism.

Mattmüller was the Secretary of the Swiss Peace Council from 1951 to 1954. He was a Constituent Councillor of both Basel cantons from 1960 to 1969, and a judge at the Civil Court from 1964 to 1967.

== Selected works ==
- Leonhard Ragaz und der religiöse Sozialismus. Eine Biographie. 2 volumes. Zollikon: EVZ, 1957/1968 (also: dissertation, University of Basel, 1957).
- Bevölkerungsgeschichte der Schweiz. Teil I: Die frühe Neuzeit, 1500–1700 (= Basler Beiträge zur Geschichtswissenschaft. vol. 154). 2 volumes. Basel: Helbling und Lichtenhahn, 1987.

== Bibliography ==
- Bernard Degen: Mattmüller, Markus in German, French and Italian in the online Historical Dictionary of Switzerland, November 9, 2010.
- Schaffner, Martin (2004). "Abschied von Markus Mattmüller". Traverse (in German). Vol. 11/2. pp. 7–9. doi:10.5169/seals-26383.
- Spieler, Willy (2003). "Nachruf Markus Mattmüller (1928–2003)". Neue Wege (in German). Vol. 97/12. pp. 362–364.
