= Anastaseos tou Kyriou =

Cemetery in Thessaloniki, Greece

Coordinates: 40.582°N 22.987°E

Anastaseos tou Kyriou (Greek: Αναστάσεως του Κυρίου, English: Resurrection of Lord) is a public cemetery in Thessaloniki, Greece. It is located about 10 km East from the center of Thessaloniki and belongs to the Municipality of Pylaia. It is divided in two parts (left and right) and in the middle there is a Greek Orthodox church as well as small funeral rooms.
