= List of Finnish films of the 2010s =

A list of films released in Finland ordered by year of release. For an alphabetical list of Finnish films see Category:Finnish films

| Title | Director | Cast | Genre | Notes |
|---|---|---|---|---|
2010
| Iron Sky | Timo Vuorensola | Udo Kier, Tilo Prückner, Götz Otto, Julia Dietze | Science fiction, Comedy | |
| Return | Harri J. Rantala | Eerik Kantokoski, Reeta Annala, Kalevi Haapoja, Kauko Salo | Drama | |
| Täällä Pohjantähden alla II | Timo Koivusalo | Ilkka Koivula, Vera Kiiskinen, Risto Tuorila, Hannu-Pekka Björkman | Drama | |
| Bad Family | Aleksi Salmenperä | Ville Virtanen, Lauri Tilkanen, Pihla Viitala, Vera Kiiskinen | Drama, Comedy | |
| Lapland Odyssey (Napapiirin sankarit) | Dome Karukoski | Jussi Vatanen, Jasper Pääkkönen, Timo Lavikainen, Pamela Tola, Kari Ketonen, Miia Nuutila | Comedy | |
| Priest of Evil | Olli Saarela | Peter Franzén, Irina Björklund | Thriller | |
| Rare Exports: A Christmas Tale | Jalmari Helander | Jorma Tommila, Tommi Korpela, Peeter Jakobi, Onni Tommila | Action, Comedy, Fantasy | |
2011
| Battle for the City | Jouko Aaltonen | | Documentary | |
| Sixpack | Ville Jankeri | Eero Milonoff | Comedy | |
| Dirty Bomb | Elias Koskimies | Malla Malmivaara | Comedy | |
| Risto | Tuomas Summanen | Risto Kaskilahti, Krista Kosonen | Comedy | |
| The Death of an Insect | Hannes Vartiainen, Pekka Veikkolainen | | Short, experimental | |
| The Storage | Taru Mäkelä | Kari-Pekka Toivonen, Minttu Mustakallio, Aku Hirviniemi, Esko Salminen, Vesa Vierikko | Comedy | |
2012
| Härmä | JP Siili | Mikko Leppilampi, Lauri Tilkanen, Pamela Tola | Drama | |
| Nightmare | Marko Äijö | Sara Parikka, Venla Savikuja, Mikko Parikka | Horror thriller | |
| Zone | Esa Luttinen | Sami Tikkanen, Timo Piiri, Sami Sundman | Indie science fiction | |
2013
| American Vagabond | Susanna Helke | | Documentary | |
| 21 tapaa pilata avioliitto | Johanna Vuoksenmaa | Armi Toivanen, Aku Hirviniemi, Riku Nieminen | Comedy | |
| 8-pallo | Aku Louhimies | Jessica Grabowsky, Eero Aho, Pirkka-Pekka Petelius | Drama | |
| Long Range Patrol | Harri J. Rantala | Eerik Kantokoski, Ali Ahovaara, Hannu Rantala | Action adventure | |
| Open Up to Me | Simo Halinen | Leea Klemola, Peter Franzén | Drama | |
| August Fools | Taru Mäkelä | Kati Outinen, Esko Salminen | Comedy | |
| Kalevala: The New Era | Jari Halonen | Tommi Eronen, Ari Vakkilainen | Fantasy | |
2014
| Anselmi: The Young Werewolf (Anselmi – nuori ihmissusi) | Matti Pekkanen | Aleksi Holkko, Sami Palolampi, Pauli Hanhiniemi | Fantasy | |
| Big Game | Jalmari Helander | Samuel L. Jackson, Onni Tommila, Felicity Huffman, Victor Garber, Ted Levine, Jim Broadbent, Ray Stevenson | Action, Adventure | |
| The Grump | Dome Karukoski | Antti Litja, Petra Frey, Mari Perankoski, Iikka Forss | Comedy | | |
| Moomins on the Riviera | Xavier Picard | Russell Tovey, Nathaniel Parker, Tracy-Ann Oberman, Stephanie Winiecki, Ruth Gibson, Philippe Smolikowski, Dave Browne, Shelley Blond | Animation, Family, Comedy | |
| Nightmare 2: The Nightmare Continues | Marko Äijö | Sara Parikka, Mikko Parikka, Tero Tiittanen | Horror thriller | |
| Zarra's Law | | Tony Sirico | Crime, Drama | |
2015
| 1944 | Elmo Nüganen | Märt Pius, Maiken Schmidt, Kristjan Üksküla | War drama | |
| Armi elää! | Jörn Donner | Minna Haapkylä, Laura Birn, Hannu-Pekka Björkman, Rea Mauranen | Drama | |
| Big Game | Jalmari Helander | Samuel L. Jackson, Onni Tommila, Ray Stevenson, Felicity Huffman, Jim Broadbent, Victor Garber, Ted Levine | Action | |
| Eisenstein in Guanajuato | Peter Greenaway | Elmer Bäck, Luis Alberti, Jakob Öhrman, Maya Zapata, Rasmus Slätis | Drama | |
| Elämältä kaiken sain | Mika Kaurismäki | Vesa-Matti Loiri, Peter Franzén, Armi Toivanen | Drama/Comedy | |
| The Fencer | Klaus Härö | Märt Avandi, Ursula Ratasepp, Hendrik Toompere Jr., Lembit Ulfsak | Drama | |
| Lapland Odyssey 2 (Napapiirin sankarit 2) | Teppo Airaksinen | Jussi Vatanen, Timo Lavikainen, Pamela Tola, Kari Ketonen, Miia Nuutila | Comedy | |
| Lovemilla | Teemu Nikki | Milka Suonpää, Joel Hirvonen, Olli Rahkonen, Elina Knihtilä, Antti Reini | Sci-Fantasy romantic comedy | |
| Toiset tytöt | Esa Illi | Sara Soulié, Ida Vakkuri, Misa Lommi, Bahar Tokat | Drama, coming of age | |
| Vares – Sheriffi | Hannu Salonen | Antti Reini, Jukka-Pekka Palo, Jukka Puotila, Karoliina Blackburn, Jasper Pääkkönen | Detective film | IMDb |
| Wildeye | Antti Jokinen | Krista Kosonen, Lauri Tilkanen, Martti Suosalo, Leea Klemola, Elina Knihtilä, Tommi Korpela | War drama | |
2016
| Lake Bodom | Taneli Mustonen | Nelly Hirst-Gee, Mimosa Willamo, Mikael Gabriel | Horror | |
| Tappajan näköinen mies (The Killer-Faced Man) | Lauri Nurkse | Samuli Edelmann, Martti Suosalo, Ville Haapasalo, Krista Kosonen, Onni Tommila, Anni-Kristiina Juuso, Tatjana Kosmõnina | Thriller | |
| Hymyilevä mies (The Happiest Day in the Life of Olli Mäki) | Juho Kuosmanen | Jarkko Lahti, Oona Airola, Eero Milonoff | Drama | |
2017
| The Unknown Soldier (Tuntematon sotilas) | Aku Louhimies | Eero Aho, Johannes Holopainen, Jussi Vatanen, Aku Hirviniemi, Hannes Suominen, Paula Vesala, Samuli Vauramo, Joonas Saartamo, Arttu Kapulainen, Andrei Alén, Juho Milonoff, Matti Ristinen | War drama | |
| A Moment in the Reeds (Tämä hetki kaislikossa) | Mikko Mäkelä | Janne Puustinen, Boodi Kabbani, Mika Melender, Virpi Rautsiala | Romantic drama, LGBT | |
| Tom of Finland | Dome Karukoski | Pekka Strang, Lauri Tilkanen, Jessica Grabowsky, Taisto Oksanen, Seumas Sargent, Jakob Oftebro | Biographical drama | |
| Rendel: Dark Vengeance | Jesse Haaja | Kris Gummerus, Matti Onnismaa, Rami Rusinen, Renne Korppila | Action | |
2018
| Happier Times, Grump | Tiina Lymi | Heikki Kinnunen, Satu Tuuli Karhu, Sulevi Peltola | Comedy | |
| M | Anna Eriksson | Anna Eriksson | Experimental | |
| Laugh or Die | Erkki Kanto | Martti Suosalo, Jani Volanen | War | |
2019
| Dogs Don't Wear Pants | J-P Valkeapää | Pekka Strang, Krista Kosonen | Drama | |
