= List of Finnish films of the 2020s =

A list of films released in Finland ordered by year of release. For an alphabetical list of Finnish films see Category:Finnish films

Title	Director	Cast	Genre	Notes
2020
Tove	Zaida Bergroth	Alma Pöysti, Krista Kosonen, Shanti Roney, Joanna Haartti	Biopic	
Helene	Antti Jokinen	Laura Birn, Johannes Holopainen, Krista Kosonen	Biographical drama	
Games People Play (Seurapeli)	Jenni Toivoniemi	Emmi Parviainen, Paula Vesala	Comedy	
Goodbye Soviet Union	Lauri Randla	Niklas Kouzmitšev, Nika Savolainen, Ülle Kaljuste	Comedy-drama	
Forest Giant	Ville Jankeri	Jussi Vatanen, Hannes Suominen	Drama	
Any Day Now	Hamy Ramezan	Shahab Hosseini, Aran-Sina Keshvari	Drama	
Insanity	Miska Kajanus	Alina Tomnikov, Hanna Angelvuo, Karlo Haapiainen	Horror	
The Potato Venture	Joona Tena	Joonas Nordman, Mikko Penttilä, Alex Anton	Historical comedy	
2021
Compartment No. 6	Juho Kuosmanen	Seidi Haarla, Yura Borisov	Romantic drama	Co-produced with Russia
The Blind Man Who Did Not Want to See Titanic	Teemu Nikki	Petri Poikolainen, Marjaana Maijala	Comedy-drama	
The Renovation	Taneli Mustonen	Sami Hedberg, Kiti Kokkonen	Comedy	
The Gravedigger's Wife	Khadar Ayderus Ahmed	Omar Abdi, Yasmin Warsame	Drama	Co-produced with Somalia
The Last Ones	Veiko Õunpuu	Pääru Oja, Tommi Korpela	Drama	Co-produced with Estonia
Omerta 6/12	Aku Louhimies	Jasper Pääkkönen, Nanna Blondell	Thriller	
Quarantine	Diana Ringo	Anatoly Bely, Aleksandr Obmanov	Dystopia	Co-produced with Russia
Reunion 3: Singles Cruise	Renny Harlin	Sami Hedberg, Aku Hirviniemi	Comedy	
Sound of Violence	Alex Noyer	Jasmin Savoy Brown, Lili Simmons	Horror	Co-production with USA
Supercool	Teppo Airaksinen	Jake Short, Miles J. Harvey	Comedy	Co-production with USA
Ladies of Steel	Pamela Tola	Leena Uotila, Seela Sella	Comedy	
70 Is Just a Number	Johanna Vuoksenmaa	Hannele Lauri, Mikko Nousiainen	Comedy-drama	
Tale of the Sleeping Giants	Marko Röhr	Peter Franzén	Documentary	
The Twin	Taneli Mustonen	Teresa Palmer, Steven Cree	Horror	
2022
Hatching	Hanna Bergholm	Jani Volanen, Reino Nordin	Horror	
Girl Picture	Alli Haapasalo	Aamu Milonoff, Eleonoora Kauhanen	Drama	
The Chalice of Blood	Jarno Elonen	Marko Salminen, Antti Peltonen, Marko Loukaskorpi	War drama	
The Grump: In Search of an Escort	Mika Kaurismäki	Heikki Kinnunen, Kari Väänänen, Silu Seppälä	Comedy	
Jingle Bells	Taru Mäkelä	Christoffer Strandberg, Martti Suosalo, Eeva Litmanen	Comedy	
Kikka!	Anna Paavilainen	Sara Melleri, Elena Leeve	Drama	
Insite	Jere Koistinen	Cameron Duckett, Keenan Proctor, Eric Roberts	Action drama	
Lapua 1976	Toni Kurkimäki	Linnea Leino, Konsta Laakso, Hannu-Pekka Björkman	Disaster, drama	
Memory of Water	Saara Saarela	Saga Sarkola, Mimosa Willamo, Lauri Tilkanen	Sci-fi drama	
The Knocking	Max Seeck, Joonas Pajunen	Inka Kallén, Saana Koivisto, Pekka Strang	Horror drama	
Sisu	Jalmari Helander	Jorma Tommila, Aksel Hennie, Jack Doolan	War, action	
W	Anna Eriksson	Anna Eriksson, Parco Lee, Jussi Parviainen	Dystopia, experimental	
2023
1984	Diana Ringo	Aleksandr Obmanov, Vladimir Ivaniy, Diana Ringo	Sci-fi, dystopia	
Family Time	Tia Kouvo	Ria Kataja, Elina Knihtilä, Leena Uotila	Comedy drama	
Fallen Leaves	Aki Kaurismäki	Alma Pöysti, Jussi Vatanen	Comedy drama	
Giant's Kettle	Markku Hakala, Mari Häki	Kirsi Paananen, Henri Malkki, Atte Vuori	Drama	
Jeʹvida	Katja Gauriloff	Agafia Niemenmaa, Heidi Uʹlljan Gauriloff, Sanna-Kaisa Palo	Drama	
Isle of Doom	Keke Soikkeli	Sonja Aiello, Konsta Hietanen, Markku Pulli	Horror	
The Worst Idea Ever	Pamela Tola	Alina Tomnikov, Iina Kuustonen, Chike Ohanwe	Drama	
2024
Long Good Thursday	Mika Kaurismäki	Heikki Kinnunen, Jaana Saarinen, Iikka Forss	Comedy	
The Missile (Ohjus)	Miia Tervo	Oona Airola, Hannu-Pekka Björkman, Tommi Korpela, Jarkko Niemi, Tommi Eronen, Sakari Kuosmanen, Kai Lehtinen, Kari Väänänen, Tiina Tauraite	Comedy-drama	
Stormskerry Maja	Tiina Lymi	Amanda Jansson, Linus Troedsson	Historical drama	
Rendel 2: Cycle of Revenge	Jesse Haaja	Kris Gummerus, Sean Cronin, Bruce Payne	Action film	
The Summer Book	Charlie McDowell	Glenn Close, Emily Matthews, Anders Danielsen Lie	Drama	Co-produced with the United Kingdom and the United States
2025
Never Alone	Klaus Härö	Ville Virtanen, Kari Hietalahti	Historical drama	
Defiant	Visa Koiso-Kanttila	Ona Huczkowski, Kati Outinen, Emmi Parviainen	Drama	
Sisu: Road to Revenge	Jalmari Helander	Jorma Tommila, Stephen Lang, Richard Brake	Action	
2026
Kalevala: The Story of Kullervo	Antti Jokinen	Elias Salonen, Eero Aho	Historical fantasy	
The Kidnapping of a President	Samuli Valkama	Jussi Vatanen, Pertti Sveholm, Riitta Havukainen	Comedy drama	
Nightborn	Hanna Bergholm	Seidi Haarla, Rupert Grint	Horror drama	
Red Snow	Ilja Rautsi	Hannu-Pekka Björkman, Anni Iikkanen	Horror comedy	
