= The Squirrel (film) =

- International promotional poster
- Finnish: Orava
- Directed by: Markus Lehmusruusu
- Written by: Markus Lehmusruusu
- Produced by: Misha Jaari; Mark Lwoff
- Starring: Miro Lopperi; Mimosa Willamo; Hannu-Pekka Björkman
- Cinematography: Max Smeds
- Edited by: Florian Miosge
- Music by: Freya Arde
- Production companies: Bufo; Pallas Film; Volya Films; Zentropa Sweden
- Release date: April 2, 2026 (Finland)
- Running time: 93 minutes
- Countries: Finland, Germany, Netherlands, Sweden
- Language: Finnish

The Squirrel (Finnish: Orava) is a 2026 science fiction comedy-drama film written and directed by Markus Lehmusruusu. It is a co-production between Finland, Germany, the Netherlands and Sweden. Set in a near future where nature and animal life have almost entirely vanished, the film follows Pasi (Miro Lopperi), a designer of synthetic pets, after he discovers what appears to be the last living squirrel on Earth. His attempt to protect the animal brings him into conflict with Emilia (Mimosa Willamo), a welfare official assigned to the case.

The film premiered in Finnish cinemas on 2 April 2026. It had its international premiere at Fantastic Fest in Austin, Texas, on 20 September 2026. It was also selected as Finland's submission for Best International Feature Film at the 99th Academy Awards.

== Cast ==
- Miro Lopperi as Pasi
- Mimosa Willamo as Emilia
- Hannu-Pekka Björkman
- Eero Ritala
- Pirjo Heikkilä
- Roderick Kabanga
- Ella Mettänen
- Pirjo Lonka

== Plot ==
In a future in which nature and animals have vanished from daily life, Pasi designs robotic pets for a living. When he encounters what looks like a living squirrel near his home, he reports the sighting to the authorities, since an unregulated animal falls under the welfare system's jurisdiction. Emilia is sent in to investigate. As the case unfolds, an attraction develops between her and Pasi.

== Production ==
Lehmusruusu developed the idea for the film and brought it to TorinoFilmLab's ScriptLab programme, where it was selected in 2018. The film was produced by Misha Jaari and Mark Lwoff for Bufo, with Pallas Film of Germany, Volya Films of the Netherlands and Zentropa Sweden as co-production partners. The production used trained live squirrels rather than relying solely on animatronics or visual effects.

== Release ==
The Squirrel opened in Finnish theatres on 2 April 2026. It had its international premiere at Fantastic Fest in Austin, Texas, on 20 September 2026.

The film was selected as the opening film of the Trieste Science+Fiction Festival in Italy in October 2026. It also screened at the Nordic Film Days Lübeck in Germany and was selected for the Mar del Plata International Film Festival in Argentina. At the 2026 Utopiales festival in Nantes, France, the film won the Grand Jury Award in the international feature film competition. At the 2026 Trieste Science+Fiction Festival, The Squirrel won the Méliès d’Argent for Best European Feature Film. The film also received the INAF Event Horizon Award, presented by the Italian National Institute for Astrophysics for films addressing significant scientific themes.

== Reception ==
The Squirrel received positive reviews from Finnish critics. Karjalainen awarded the film five stars, while Helsingin Sanomat, Film-O-Holic, Kulttuuritoimitus and Kajastus each awarded it four stars. Svenska Yle's Silja Sahlgren-Fodstad praised the film's combination of seriousness and humour, as well as its exploration of the relationship between humans and nature. Episodi.fi's Jouni Vikman also praised the film, regarding it as an inventive and playful work of science fiction. At the Midnight Sun Film Festival, Kaisu Tervonen praised the film's world-building and combination of satire, dystopian elements and romance.

== See also ==
- List of submissions to the 99th Academy Awards for Best International Feature Film
- List of Finnish submissions for the Academy Award for Best International Feature Film
