= Ladies of Steel =

2020 Finnish film

- Teräsleidit
- Directed by: Pamela Tola
- Written by: Pamela Tola; Aleksi Bardy
- Produced by: Aleksi Bardy; Dome Karukoski; Sirkka Rautiainen
- Cinematography: Päivi Kettunen
- Edited by: Antti Reikko
- Production company: Helsinki-filmi
- Distributed by: SF Film
- Release date: 3 January 2020
- Running time: 92 minutes
- Country: Finland
- Language: Finnish
- Budget: €1.36 million

Ladies of Steel (Finnish: Teräsleidit) is a 2020 Finnish comedy film directed by Pamela Tola. Tola also co-wrote the screenplay with Aleksi Bardy, who produced the film alongside Dome Karukoski and Sirkka Rautiainen. The movie stars Leena Uotila, Seela Sella, Saara Pakkasvirta, and Heikki Nousiainen, with supporting performances from Pirjo Lonka, Samuli Niittymäki, and Jani Volanen.

The film humorously explores themes of aging, sisterhood, and self-discovery, as it follows three elderly sisters embarking on a road trip under extraordinary circumstances. It premiered in Finland on 3 January 2020.

The film's sequel Ladies of Steel: Like There's No Tomorrow was released in 2025.

== Plot ==
The story begins when Inkeri (Leena Uotila), believing she has killed her husband Tapio (Heikki Nousiainen) after striking him with a frying pan, seeks help from her sisters. Inkeri, along with her rebellious sibling Raili (Seela Sella) and gentle Sylvi (Saara Pakkasvirta), sets off on a road trip in search of evidence that might justify her actions. Along the way, the trio revisits unresolved conflicts, reconciles with their past, and experiences moments of both hilarity and heartfelt reflection.

== Cast ==
- Leena Uotila as Inkeri
- Seela Sella as Raili
- Saara Pakkasvirta as Sylvi
- Heikki Nousiainen as Tapio
- Pirjo Lonka as Maija
- Samuli Niittymäki as Jarkko
- Jani Volanen as Ville

== Production ==
Filming took place during the summer of 2019 in the Helsinki metropolitan area and North Karelia. The film had a budget of €1.36 million, of which €800,000 was funded by the Finnish Film Foundation. The film’s visual aesthetic was shaped by cinematographer Päivi Kettunen, with production design by Heini Erving and editing by Antti Reikko.

== Reception ==
Ladies of Steel achieved significant commercial success, quickly becoming one of Finland’s most-watched domestic films of 2020. Within two weeks of its premiere, it had drawn over 100,000 viewers, and by the end of the year, its total audience had reached approximately 250,000, making it the year’s highest-grossing new release in Finland.

The film received three nominations at the 2021 Jussi Awards: Best Film, Best Supporting Actress for Saara Pakkasvirta, and Best Makeup Design. Additionally, it was nominated for Best European Comedy at the European Film Awards in December 2020.

=== Criticism ===
Ladies of Steel received generally positive reviews, but some criticism was directed at its plot and pacing. While the performances of the lead actresses—Leena Uotila, Seela Sella, and Saara Pakkasvirta—were praised, reviewers noted that the storyline occasionally relied on clichéd road movie tropes.

Some critics found the film’s tonal shifts uneven, moving abruptly between humor and heavier themes such as aging and regret. For example, Helsingin Sanomat described the film as "a riotous and uninhibited comedy with heartfelt emotions," but pointed out that its narrative lacked focus at times.

Similarly, Variety praised the film for its humor and ability to tell stories about older women—a demographic often overlooked in cinema—but remarked that the script could have benefited from tighter pacing.
