= Ricky Rapper and the Strongman =

- Directed by: Markus Lehmusruusu
- Written by: Sinikka Nopola; Tiina Nopola
- Based on: Risto Räppääjä ja pullistelija by Sinikka and Tiina Nopola
- Produced by: Rimbo Salomaa; Jukka Helle; Markus Selin
- Starring: Silmu Ståhlberg; Lumi Kallio; Eelis Kesäläinen; Ylermi Rajamaa; Pamela Tola; Jenni Kokander; Timo Lavikainen
- Cinematography: Robert Nordström
- Edited by: Joona Louhivuori
- Music by: Iiro Rantala
- Production companies: Solar Films; Ricky Rapper
- Distributed by: Nordisk Film
- Release date: February 15, 2019
- Running time: 84 minutes
- Country: Finland
- Language: Finnish
- Budget: €1,717,600

Ricky Rapper and the Strongman (Finnish: Risto Räppääjä ja pullistelija) is a 2019 Finnish children's film directed by Markus Lehmusruusu. It was written by Sinikka and Tiina Nopola, based on their 2016 book of the same name. The film's music was composed by Iiro Rantala. The main cast includes Silmu Ståhlberg, Lumi Kallio, Eelis Kesäläinen, Ylermi Rajamaa, Pamela Tola, Jenni Kokander, and Timo Lavikainen.

The story follows Ricky (Ståhlberg), his friend Nelly (Kallio), his aunt Rauha (Tola), and his neighbor Mr. Lindberg (Rajamaa) as they vacation at a cabin resort. There, they meet father-and-son Bill (Lavikainen) and Sylvester Pöntinen (Kesäläinen), who are preparing for a strength competition. When Rauha and Nelly develop an interest in fitness, Ricky and Mr. Lindberg become jealous. Determined to prove their strength, they enlist Ricky’s Aunt Elvi to train them for an arm-wrestling match.

The film premiered on February 15, 2019, and became Finland’s fifth most-watched film of the year, as well as the most-watched domestic film, with 288,305 theater admissions.

== Cast ==
- Silmu Ståhlberg - Ricky Rapper
- Jenni Kokander
- Pamela Tola - Rauha Rapper
- Ylermi Rajamaa - Lennart Lindberg
- Timo Lavikainen - Bill Pöntinen
- Lumi Kallio - Nelly Noodlehead
- Eelis Kesäläinen - Sylvester Pöntinen
