= Defiant (2025 film) =

2025 Finnish drama film

- Original Finnish film poster
- Directed by: Visa Koiso-Kanttila
- Written by: Reeta Ruotsalainen
- Produced by: Tiina Pesonen; Minna Haapkylä; Olli Suominen
- Starring: Ona Huczkowski; Kati Outinen; Emmi Parviainen
- Cinematography: Kerttu Hakkarainen
- Edited by: Matti Näränen
- Music by: Lau Nau
- Production company: Rabbit Films
- Distributed by: B-Plan Distribution
- Release date: 28 February 2025
- Running time: 93 min
- Country: Finland
- Language: Finnish
- Budget: €1.6 million

Defiant (Finnish: Uhma) is a 2025 Finnish drama film directed by Visa Koiso-Kanttila. It tells the story of Vilma, who has lost her father and is sent to a youth home, where Vilma shows no signs of submitting to the strict discipline and order maintained by the youth home staff. The film's cast includes Ona Huczkowski, Kati Outinen and Emmi Parviainen.

The film premiered on 28 February 2025.

== Cast ==
- Ona Huczkowski as Vilma
- Tinka Andersson as Yasmine
- Joonatan Pekola as Risto
- Sami Sowe as Ismael
- Kati Outinen as Anneli
- Emmi Parviainen as Krisu
- Tuomas Nilsson as Matti
- Jarkko Pajunen as Jarno
- Sonja Kuittinen as Ilona
- Samuli Niittymäki as Niklas
- Timo Teern as Rane

== Production ==
The film is based on preliminary research conducted by director Koiso-Kanttila into the challenges and problems of child welfare institutions. Filming began in February 2024. The film was largely shot in Salo. Its budget was approximately €1.6 million, of which the support granted by the Finnish Film Foundation was approximately one million euros.

== See also ==
- List of Finnish films of the 2020s
