= Aleksi Bardy =

Finnish screenwriter and film producer (born 1970)

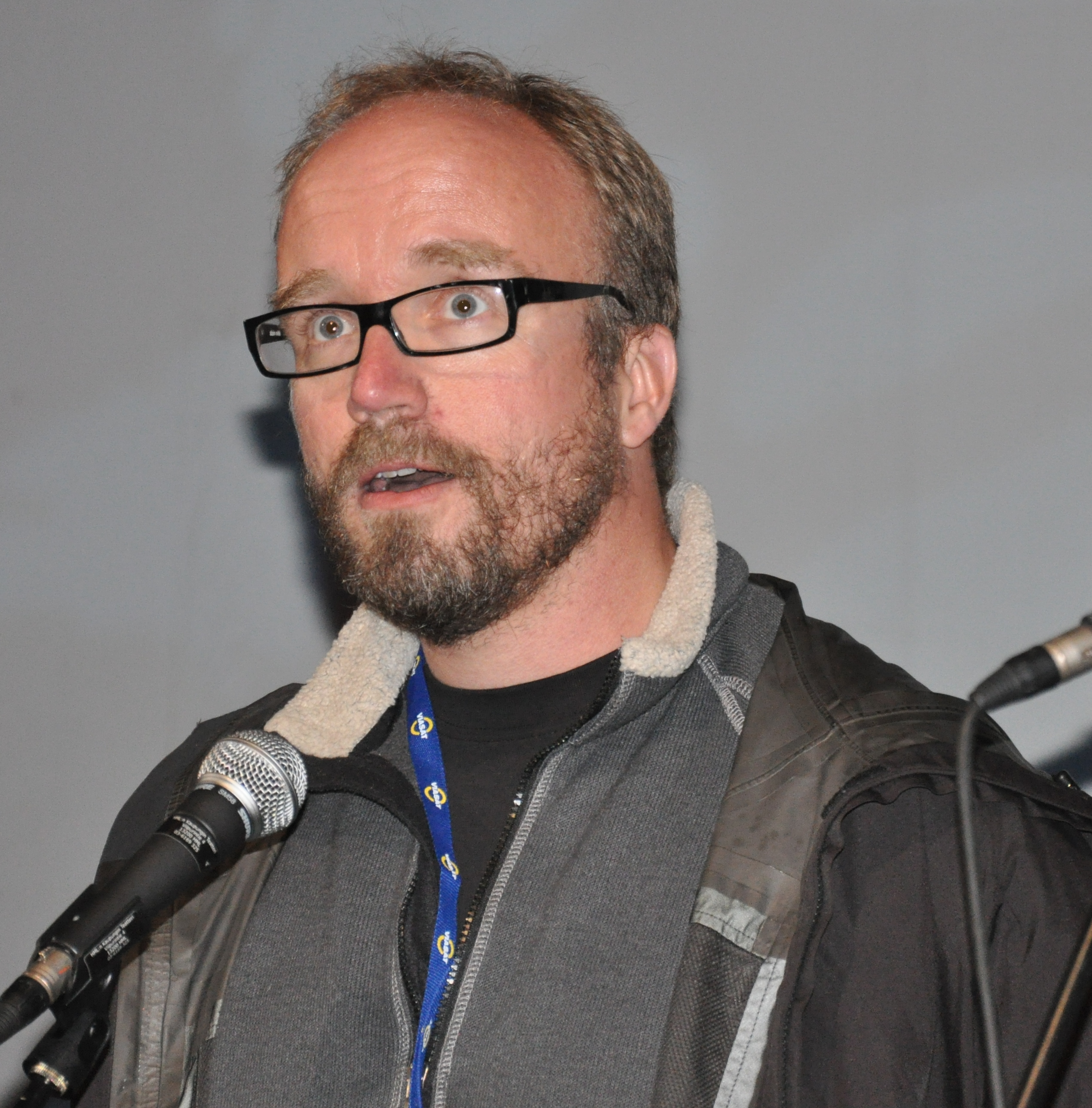
Bardy in 2009

Aleksi Bardy (born 24 September 1970) is a Finnish television writer, screenwriter and film producer. He has been a political activist on the left of the political spectrum (Left Alliance), once standing in elections for the Finnish parliament. Bardy was born in Helsinki.

== Career ==
Bardy wrote the script for the 2006 film Saippuaprinssi working with film director Janne Kuusi, starring Mikko Leppilampi and Pamela Tola. He also co-wrote the TV series Käenpesä.

== Filmography ==
=== Feature films ===
- The Tough Ones (1999), script
- Restless (2000), script
- Young Gods (2003), script editor and producer
- Kukkia ja sidontaa (2004), script writer and co-producer
- Beauty and the Bastard (2005), producer
- Saippuaprinssi (2006), script
- The Emperor's Secret (2006), script writer and producer
- Ganes (2007), producer
- The Border (2007), writer
- Tears of April (2008), producer
- Forbidden Fruit (2009), writer and producer
- Lapland Odyssey (2010), producer
- Ja saapuu oikea yö (2012), producer
- Heart of a Lion (2013)
- Tove (2020), producer
- Reunion 3: Singles Cruise (2021), script
- The Worst Idea Ever (2023), producer
- Comeback (2023), script-writer and producer

=== TV series ===
- Let's Play Zeus (1994)
- Kotikatu (1995)
- Laskettu aika (1996)
- Tähtitehdas (1998)
- Salatut elämät (1998)
- Itse valtiaat (2001)
- Käenpesä (2004)
- Kukkia ja sidontaa (2006)
- Moscow Noir (2018)
- Codename: Annika (2023)
