= Jukka Puotila =

Finnish actor and impersonator (born 1955)

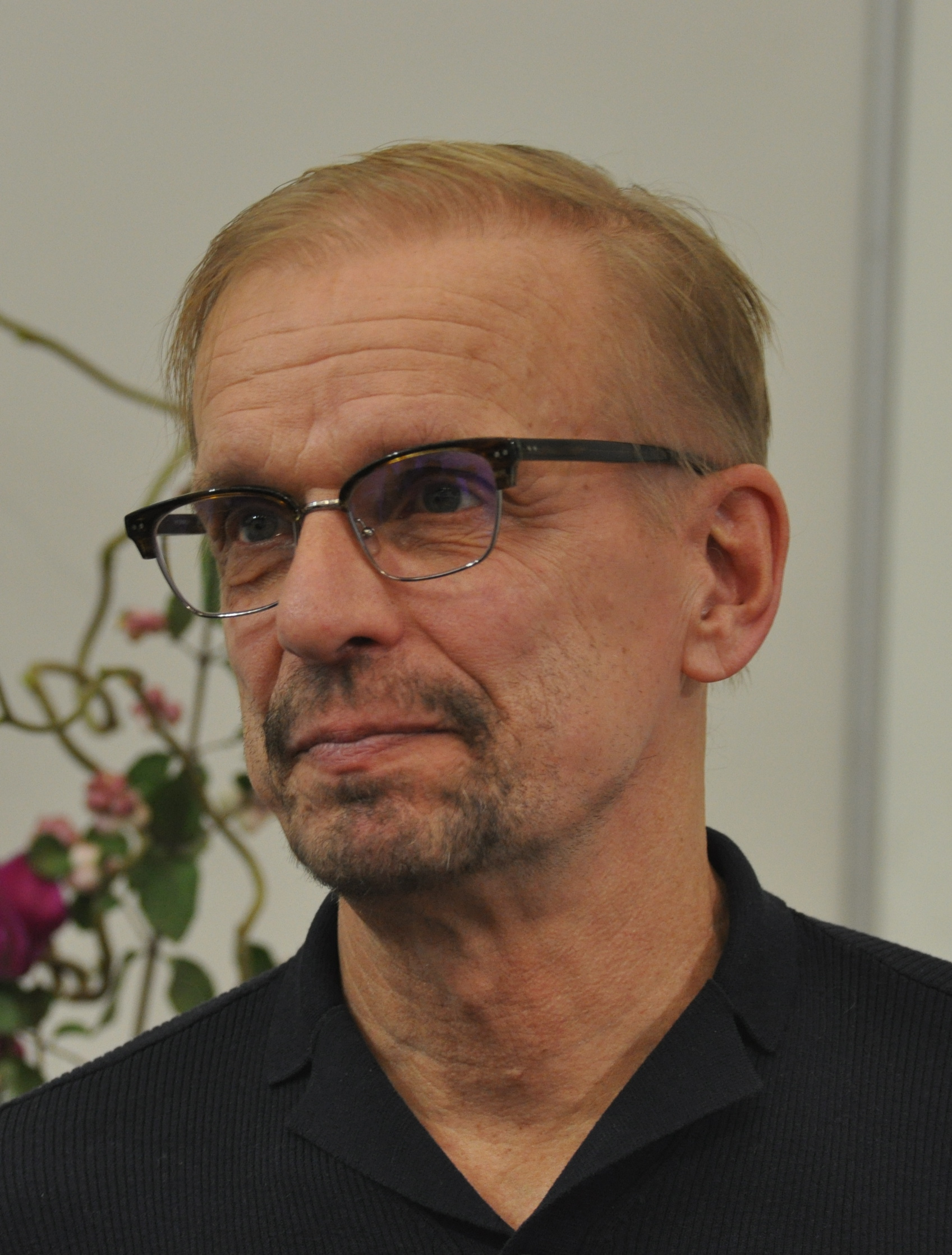
- Jukka Puotila during the Turku Book Fair in October 2016
- Born: 9 September 1955 (age 70); Helsinki, Finland
- Occupations: Actor; impersonator
- Years active: 1981–present

Jukka Puotila (born 9 September 1955) is a Finnish actor and impersonator. He appeared in more than 60 films since 1981. On television, he is best known as Pertti Mäkimaa in Yle TV1's drama series Kotikatu (1995–2012).

He has impersonated several famous Finnish people, such as Sauli Niinistö, Paavo Väyrynen, Timo Soini, Antero Mertaranta, Carl-Erik Creutz, Raimo Ilaskivi, Tommi Mäkinen and Seppo Kääriäinen.

== Selected filmography ==
Film
Year	Title	Role	Notes
1997	Kummeli: Kultakuume		
2004	Addiction	Herman	
2007	The Year of the Wolf		
2010	The Emperor's Secret		voice only
2011	Dirty Bomb		
2015	Armi elää!		
2021	Reunion 3: Singles Cruise		

TV
Year	Title	Role	Notes
1986–1988	Fakta homma	Hairdresser	Supporting role
1995–2012	Kotikatu	Pertti Mäkimaa	Regular role; 480 episodes
2017	Putous	Sauli Niinistö	Guest star
2022	Stop Nyqvist		
