= Red Snow (2026 film) =

Upcoming Finnish comedy horror film

- Original Finnish film poster.
- Finnish: Punaista lunta
- Directed by: Ilja Rautsi
- Written by: Ilja Rautsi
- Produced by: Misha Jaari; Mark Lwoff
- Starring: Hannu-Pekka Björkman; Anni Iikkanen; Kari Hietalahti; Krista Kosonen; Tommi Korpela; Eeva Litmanen; Jussi Vatanen; Otava Rossi; Marja-Liisa Nguyen
- Cinematography: Kerttu Hakkarainen
- Edited by: Eric Bäckström
- Music by: Hans Appelqvist
- Production companies: Bufo; Allfilm; Hobab
- Distributed by: B-Plan Distribution
- Release date: 20 November 2026 (Finland)
- Countries: Finland; Estonia; Sweden
- Language: Finnish
- Budget: €2.5 million

Red Snow (Finnish: Punaista lunta) is an upcoming Finnish comedy-horror film written and directed by Ilja Rautsi. The film follows a 16-year-old emo teen Johanna whose dreams of a vampire are shattered when she encounters Martti, a beer-bellied, balding bloodsucker who wears a Santa suit to terrorize families.

The film will be premiered in November 2026.

== See also ==
- List of Finnish films of the 2020s
