= In Human Disguise =

In Human Disguise (Finnish: Ihmisen asussa) is a Finnish play performed at the Zodiak dance theatre in Kaapelitehdas, Helsinki, in November 2009. The play is for four female performers, who perform the entire play completely naked. One performance of the play is a special event where the audience can also strip naked if they want.

== Cast and crew ==
- Choreography and direction: Eeva Muilu, Milja Sarkola
- Performers: Joanna Haartti, Monika Hartl, Niina Hosiasluoma, Hanna Raiskinmäki
