= Markus Lehmusruusu =

Finnish filmmaker (born 1983)

- Lehmusruusu in 2024
- Born: 1983 (age 42–43)
- Occupations: Film director, screenwriter

Markus Lehmusruusu (born 1983) is a Finnish film director and screenwriter. His debut feature, Ricky Rapper and the Strongman (2019), was Finland's most-watched domestic film of 2019. His second feature, The Squirrel (2026), was selected as Finland's entry for Best International Feature Film at the 99th Academy Awards. The film won the Grand Jury Award at the 2026 Utopiales festival in Nantes, France, and the Méliès d’Argent for Best European Feature Film at the 2026 Trieste Science+Fiction Festival.

== Early life and education ==
Lehmusruusu studied film directing at the University of Art and Design Helsinki (Taideteollinen korkeakoulu), which later became part of Aalto University.

== Career ==
=== Short films and early work ===
Lehmusruusu's short film Miss Zahra (2015), produced by Mjölk Movies, had its world premiere at the Palm Springs International ShortFest and screened at the Moscow International Film Festival. In 2016, the film received a 10,000-euro quality grant (laatutuki) from Finland's State Audiovisual Art Committee, operating under the Arts Promotion Centre Finland.

His short film Puita ja semmosia (2011) won the Best Fiction award at the Artova Film Festival in 2011 and screened in competition at the Nordisk Panorama film festival in Aarhus, Denmark. It also received a special jury mention at the Castellinaria cinema festival in Bellinzona, Switzerland, in 2012.

=== Television ===
Lehmusruusu co-directed the first season of the Yle drama series Kakarat with Juho Kuosmanen and returned to direct the third season (2023).

He also co-directed the mystery series Lovi (2021) with Miia Tervo for Yle. The series was among the international finalists in the 11–15 Years Fiction category of the Prix Jeunesse International festival in 2022. The series was among the international finalists in the 11–15 Years Fiction category of the Prix Jeunesse International festival in 2022.

=== Ricky Rapper and the Strongman (2019) ===
In 2019, Lehmusruusu directed Ricky Rapper and the Strongman (Finnish: Risto Räppääjä ja pullistelija), based on the children's book series by Sinikka and Tiina Nopola. The film became Finland's fifth most-watched film of 2019 and its most-watched domestic film, with 288,305 theater admissions.

=== The Squirrel (2026) ===
Lehmusruusu wrote and directed The Squirrel (Orava), a science-fiction comedy-drama. The Squirrel is a co-production between Finland, Germany, the Netherlands and Sweden and was developed through TorinoFilmLab's ScriptLab programme in 2018. The film premiered in Finnish cinemas on April 2, 2026, to positive reviews from Finnish critics and had its international premiere at Fantastic Fest in Austin, Texas, on September 20, 2026. In September 2026, The Squirrel was selected as the Finnish entry for Best International Feature Film at the 99th Academy Awards. In October 2026, the film opened the Trieste Science+Fiction Festival in Italy. It won the Méliès d’Argent for Best European Feature Film and the INAF Event Horizon Award at the festival. It also won the Grand Jury Award in the international feature film competition at the 2026 Utopiales festival in Nantes, France.

== Filmography ==
Year	Title	Role	Notes
2011	Puita ja semmosia	Writer, Director	Short film
2015	Miss Zahra	Director	Short film
2019	Ricky Rapper and the Strongman	Director	Feature film
2020–2023	Kakarat	Director	TV series; season 1 (co-directed with Juho Kuosmanen); season 3
2021	Roba	Director	TV series; season 5, episodes 1-4
2021	Lovi	Director	TV series; co-directed with Miia Tervo
2024	Karkurit	Director	TV series; season 2, episodes 1-4
2026	The Squirrel (Orava)	Writer, Director	Feature film
