= Heart of a Lion =

2013 film

- Film poster
- Directed by: Dome Karukoski
- Written by: Aleksi Bardy
- Produced by: Aleksi Bardy
- Starring: Peter Franzén
- Cinematography: Henri Blomberg
- Release dates: 6 September 2013 (TIFF); 18 October 2013 (Finland)
- Running time: 99 minutes
- Country: Finland
- Language: Finnish

Heart of a Lion (Finnish: Leijonasydän) is a 2013 Finnish drama film directed by Dome Karukoski. It was screened in the Contemporary World Cinema section at the 2013 Toronto International Film Festival. The film tells the story about a Neo-Nazi named Teppo, who falls in love with a woman named Sari. He later finds out that Sari's son from the previous marriage is black. This leads Teppo to trouble with his fellow Neo-Nazis, especially his half-brother Harri.

== Cast ==
- Peter Franzén as Teppo
- Jasper Pääkkönen as Harri
- Laura Birn as Sari
- Pamela Tola
- Jussi Vatanen
- Timo Lavikainen
