= Alina Tomnikov =

Finnish actress (born 1988)

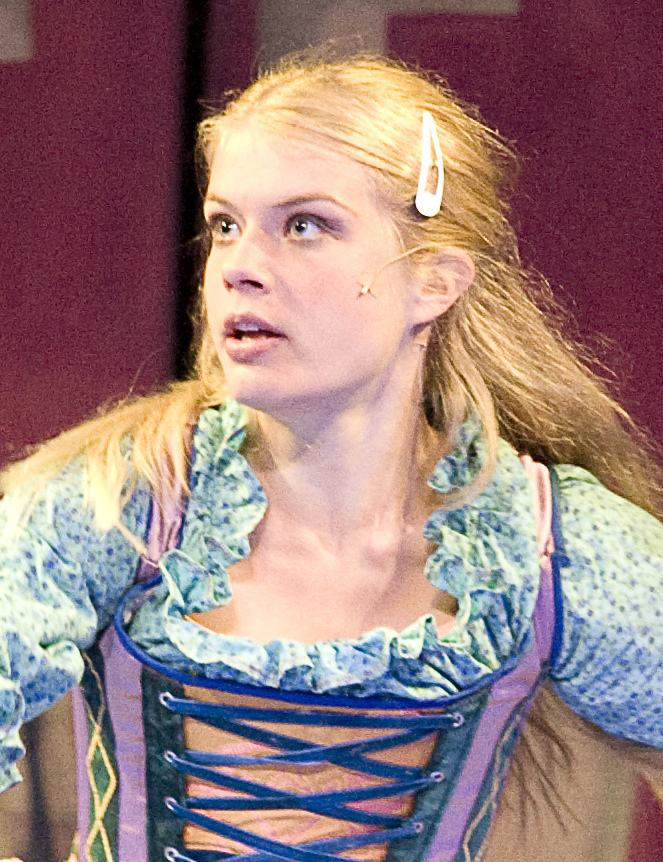
- Tomnikov in 2011
- Born: 24 June 1988 (age 38); Kerava, Uusimaa, Finland
- Occupations: Actress; writer
- Years active: 2006–present

Alina Tomnikov (born 24 June 1988) is a Finnish actress and writer.

== Early life ==
Alina Tomnikov was born on 24 June 1988 in Kerava, Finland, to a Russian father and Finnish mother. She holds only Finnish citizenship. Her parents met in Saint Petersburg, where her mother was studying to be physician. The family moved to Finland in the late 1980s. She graduated from Helsinki Theatre Academy with a master's degree in 2013.

Her cousin is ice hockey player Rami Määttä.

== Career ==
In 2017, Tomnikov made her Russian acting debut, starring as Princess Wilhelmina of Hesse-Darmstadt / Her Highness Natalya Alexeyevna in historical television series Ekaterina. She joined the cast of the ninth season of the sketch comedy television show Putous in 2018. In 2018, she starred in the titular role in Yle's drama series Donna, portraying a blind woman seeking love after being left by her husband.

In 2023, Tomnikov starred in her debut leading role in Pamela Tola's drama film The Worst Idea Ever. She was honored the Shooting Stars Award by European Film Promotion. She released her first novel, Käännä hirviö kylkiasentoon on 30 August 2023.

== Personal life ==
Tomnikov married director and cinematographer Lauri Laukkanen on 7 July 2019. She gave birth to their first child in August 2023.

== Filmography ==
=== Film ===
Year	Title	Role	Notes
2013	Rolli and the Golden Key	Milli Menninkäinen	
2014	The Grump	Ldujmila	
2014	Mercy All the Way	Angelica	Short film
2015	Homebreaker	Roosa	Short film
2015	TV Cops	Sanna	
2016	Love Records	Anna	
2016	Rolli and the Secret Route	Milli Menninkäinen	
2016	The Log	Makeup	Short film
2017	The Unknown Soldier	Russian woman	
2017	Rendel	Marla	
2017	Euthanizer	Elisa	
2017	Amnesia	Sonja	Short film Also as writer
2018	My Brother's Keeper	Anna	
2018	Trainer	Secretary	
2019	Insanity	Vivi	
2021	Rabobesto – Or How I Saved a Monster	Golden girl	Short film
2022	Solar Wind Alley	Alice	
2022	Häät ennen hautajaisia	—N/a	As story developer
2023	The Worst Idea Ever	Ripe	
2023	Finders 2: Pharaoh's Ring	Annabella Pehko	
2023	Fallen Leaves	Tonja	

=== Television ===
Year	Title	Role	Notes
2006–2007	Jako kahteen	Tuuli	
2012	Roba	Minna	
2014	Nymphs	Milena	
2014	Ihan sama	Agent	
2015	Hinnalla millä hyvänsä	Janna	
2015	1001 Rikua	Olga	
2016–2017	Downshiftaajat	Anna Myllylä	
2017–2019	Syke	Jonna Korvenoja	
2017–2019	Ekaterina	Princess Wilhelmina of Hesse-Darmstadt / Her Highness Natalya Alexeyevna	
2017	Pää edellä	Emmi	
2018	Putous	Various characters	Also as writer
2018	Deadwind	Iiris	
2018	Donna	Donna	
2018	Ratamo	Elena Baronova	
2018	Aikuisen naisen joulukalenteri	Iines, Victoria Beckham	
2018	Arctic Circle	Lana	
2019–present	Moominvalley	Snorkmaiden	Voice role
2019	Kevyttä yläpilveä	Venla	
2022	True Story Suomi	Henna	Episode: "Maiju"
2022	Paratiisi	Sohanna Lahti	

== Bibliography ==
- Käännä hirviö kylkiasentoon, Otava (30 August 2023), ISBN 978-951-1-38258-4
