= Lapland Odyssey 2 =

2015 Finnish comedy film

- Finnish poster
- Finnish: Napapiirin sankarit 2
- Directed by: Teppo Airaksinen
- Written by: Pekko Pesonen
- Produced by: Jarkko Hentula; Olli Haikka
- Starring: Jussi Vatanen; Timo Lavikainen; Pamela Tola; Kari Ketonen; Miia Nuutila
- Cinematography: Teppo Högman
- Edited by: Jussi Rautaniemi
- Music by: Kalle Koivisto
- Production company: Yellow Film & TV
- Distributed by: Nordisk Film
- Release dates: 26 August 2015 (Kolari); 30 September 2015 (Finland)
- Running time: 90 minutes
- Country: Finland
- Language: Finnish
- Budget: €1,600,000
- Box office: $4,791,063

Lapland Odyssey 2 (Finnish: Napapiirin sankarit 2) is a 2015 Finnish comedy film directed by Teppo Airaksinen. The film is sequel to the 2010 film Lapland Odyssey and it stars Jussi Vatanen, Timo Lavikainen, Pamela Tola, Kari Ketonen and Miia Nuutila. The film was premiered in Kolari a month before the wider premiere.

== Plot ==
Janne and Inari live together with the newest member of the family, a daughter named Lumi. When Räihänen and Marjukka, who have moved south from Lapland, arrive for a visit in the fall, the women go to spend a girls' night at Pikku-Mikko's luxurious hotel. The men, who are left as babysitters, run away with one-year-old Lumi to Ylläs to help with the wedding, but "a couple of changes" bring twists and turns along the way.

== Cast ==
- Jussi Vatanen as Janne
- Timo Lavikainen as Räihänen
- Pamela Tola as Inari
- Kari Ketonen as Pikku-Mikko
- Miia Nuutila as Marjukka
- Santtu Karvonen as Kämäräinen
- Joonas Nordman as Sekis
- Pinja Pakisjärvi as Lumi
- Peter Franzén as Jorma

Actress and writer Anna-Leena Härkönen makes in a small role as a receptionist.

== Production ==
Filming for the film began in the fall of 2014, first with studio filming in Helsinki and then in Lapland. Filming locations included Kolari and Äkäslompolo.

== See also ==
- List of Finnish films of the 2010s
