= Rami Määttä =

Finnish ice hockey player

- Born: 3 April 2002 (age 24) Oulu, Finland
- Height: 181 cm (5 ft 11 in)
- Weight: 80 kg (176 lb; 12 st 8 lb)
- Position: Defenceman
- Shoots: Left
- Liiga team: HC Ässät Pori
- Playing career: 2020–present

Rami Määttä (born 3 April 2002) is a Finnish professional ice hockey defenceman who plays for HC Ässät Pori of the Finnish Elite League and serves as the team's alternate captain. Määttä played his junior years in his local team Oulun Kärpät but moved to the HC Ässät Pori in 2018 at the U18 level. Määttä was awarded Ässät's alternate captaincy for the 2024–25 Liiga season. He won the U20 Finnish Championship in 2024, joining Ässät's U20 squad after the men's team got eliminated from a playoff spot.

== Career ==
Rami Määttä started playing ice hockey in the junior ranks of his local ice hockey team, Oulun Kärpät. He moved to the HC Ässät Pori U18 squad in 2018 at 16 years old after he could not afford to play for the Kärpät team. Määttä debuted professionally with Ässät in the 2020–21 season in a game against JYP Jyväskylä. He broke the Liiga record for most career games without a goal, scoring his first goal in the 177th game of his career. After Ässät had missed the 2024 playoffs, Määttä joined the U20 Ässät squad, winning the club their second ever U20 SM-sarja Legacy Bowl championship. Määttä was designated as Ässät's alternate captain for the 2024–25 season.

== Personal life ==
Määttä completed his senior high school education in Pori in 2021. Finnish-Russian actress Alina Tomnikov is Määttä's cousin. Määttä's athletic background is diverse; before focusing fully on ice hockey, he played association football at the junior level with Oulun Luistinseura. His father is a former rinkball player and Määttä himself has played rinkball in the I-divisioona, Finland's second-highest rinkball league, as a member of RW-Team.

== Career statistics ==
=== Regular season and playoffs ===
			Regular season					Playoffs
Season	Team	League	GP	G	A	Pts	PIM	GP	G	A	Pts	PIM
2018–19	HC Ässät Pori	U20	11	0	2	2	6	—	—	—	—	—
2019–20	HC Ässät Pori	U20	46	1	17	18	18	1	0	0	0	0
2020–21	HC Ässät Pori	U20	18	1	11	12	6	2	0	0	0	0
2020–21	HC Ässät Pori	Liiga	14	0	2	2	4	—	—	—	—	—
2021–22	HC Ässät Pori	U20	2	1	2	3	0	3	0	2	2	2
2021–22	HC Ässät Pori	Liiga	52	0	13	13	20	—	—	—	—	—
2022–23	HC Ässät Pori	Liiga	60	0	4	4	24	8	0	0	0	2
2023–24	HC Ässät Pori	U20	—	—	—	—	—	4	1	3	4	8
2023–24	HC Ässät Pori	Liiga	59	1	7	8	16	—	—	—	—	—
2024–25	HC Ässät Pori	Liiga	59	2	15	17	20	10	1	1	2	2
Liiga totals			244	3	41	44	84	18	1	1	2	4
