= Saippuaprinssi =

2006 film

- DVD cover
- Directed by: Janne Kuusi
- Written by: Aleksi Bardy
- Starring: Mikko Leppilampi, Pamela Tola, Outi Mäenpää
- Release date: 2006
- Running time: 97 min
- Language: Finnish

Saippuaprinssi ("Soap Prince") is a 2006 Finnish romantic comedy film directed by Janne Kuusi starring Mikko Leppilampi and Pamela Tola. Aleksi Bardy wrote the script.

== Cast ==
- Pamela Tola .... Ilona
- Mikko Leppilampi .... Kalle/Antero
- Outi Mäenpää .... Raakel
- Teijo Eloranta .... Tape Recorder
- Kristiina Halttu .... Reija/Seija (as Kristina Halttu)
- Sari Havas .... Writer
- Jarmo Hyttinen .... Angel (as Jami Hyttinen)
- Julia Jokinen .... Script girl
- Risto Kaskilahti .... Mixer
- Tommi Korpela .... Assistant director
- Jani Volanen .... Director
- Anu Koskinen .... Receptionist
- Jukka-Pekka Palo .... Kalela, head of TV-channel
- Juha Veijonen .... Actor Laaksonen
- Pete Lattu .... Amateur actor Leo
- Anna Paavilainen .... Ilona's roommate Jonna
- Pihla Penttinen .... Amateur theatre director Tiina
- Minttu Mustakallio .... Script editor Eeva
- Janne Reinikainen .... Script editor Vesa
- Zarkus Poussa .... Sound effect man
