= The Man Who Died (TV series) =

2022 Finnish television miniseries

- Finnish: Mies joka kuoli
- Based on: The Man Who Died, by Antti Tuomainen
- Directed by: Samuli Valkama
- Starring: Jussi Vatanen
- Composer: Lasse Enersen
- Countries of origin: Finland; Germany
- Original languages: Finnish; English
- No. of seasons: 2
- No. of episodes: 12

Production
- Producer: Markku Flink
- Cinematography: Anssi Leino
- Running time: 43–45 minutes

Original release
- Release: 9 June 2022 – present

The Man Who Died (Finnish: Mies joka kuoli) is a drama dark comedy television miniseries from Finland that premiered in 2022.

== Premise ==
Based on the homonymous novel by Antti Tuomainen, the series tells the story of Jaakko Kaunismaa, a successful mushroom entrepreneur, who falls ill with mysterious symptoms and discovers someone has been slowly poisoning him. His days are numbered, but before his impending death, Jaakko decides to uncover the murderer.

== Cast ==
- Jussi Vatanen as Jaakko Kaunismaa
- Sara Soulié as Sanni
- Elias Westerberg as Petri
- Saara Kotkaniemi as Taina

== International distribution ==
The series became available in Australia on SBS On Demand in 2023, and was broadcast in Portugal by RTP 2 in 2025.
