= Tiina Rinne =

Finnish actress (1929–2021)

- Born: 24 May 1929; Turku, Finland
- Died: 27 January 2021 (aged 91); Helsinki, Finland
- Years active: 1946–2018

Tiina Maarita Rinne (officially Rinne-Reitala; 24 May 1929 – 27 January 2021) was a Finnish Actor.

== Career ==
She worked mainly as a theater actress, especially at the Finnish National Theatre, where she retired in 1994. She is also known for her role as Maija Mäkimaa in the television series Kotikatu.

=== Films ===
- Kultainen kynttilänjalka, 1946
- Ruusu ja kulkuri, 1948
- Kalle-Kustaa Korkin seikkailut, 1949
- Kanavan laidalla, 1949
- Prinsessa Ruusunen, 1949
- Ratavartijan kaunis Inkeri, 1950
- Amor hoi!, 1950
- Isäpappa ja keltanokka, 1950
- Aatamin puvussa... ja vähän Eevankin, 1971
- Pieni pyhiinvaellus, 2000

=== Television ===
- Hanski (Emma), 1966–1967
- Kotikatu (Maija Mäkimaa), 1995–2012
- Ratamo (Aila Nikula), 2018
