= Tom of Finland (film) =

2017 film by Dome Karukoski

- Finnish theatrical release poster
- Directed by: Dome Karukoski
- Written by: Aleksi Bardy
- Produced by: Aleksi Bardy; Miia Haavisto; Annika Sucksdorff
- Starring: Pekka Strang; Lauri Tilkanen; Jessica Grabowsky; Taisto Oksanen; Seumas Sargent; Jakob Oftebro; Niklas Hogner
- Cinematography: Lasse Frank
- Edited by: Harri Ylönen
- Music by: Hildur Guðnadóttir; Lasse Enersen
- Production companies: Helsinki-filmi; Anagram Väst; Fridthjof Film; Neutrinos Productions; Film Väst
- Distributed by: Finnkino (Finland); MFA+ Filmdistribution (Germany); Kino Lorber (United States)
- Release dates: 27 January 2017 (Gothenburg); 24 February 2017 (Finland); 3 March 2017 (Sweden); 5 October 2017 (Germany); 13 October 2017 (United States)
- Running time: 115 minutes
- Countries: Finland; Sweden; Denmark; Germany; United States
- Languages: Finnish; English
- Budget: €3.8 million
- Box office: $1.8 million

Tom of Finland is a 2017 biographical drama film directed by Dome Karukoski and written by Aleksi Bardy. It stars Pekka Strang as Touko Laaksonen, better known as Tom of Finland, a Finnish homoerotic artist.

Tom of Finland premiered on 27 January 2017 at Gothenburg Film Festival and was released theatrically in Finland on 24 February 2017. It was selected as the Finnish entry for the Best Foreign Language Film at the 90th Academy Awards, but it was not nominated.

== Premise ==
Touko Laaksonen returns home after serving in World War II. In post-war Helsinki, he makes a name for himself with his homoerotic drawings of muscular men. Before finding fame, he finds challenges from his sister and Finnish society due to his art.

== Cast ==
- Pekka Strang as Touko Laaksonen a.k.a. Tom of Finland
- Lauri Tilkanen as Veli (Nipa)
- Jessica Grabowsky as Kaija Laaksonen
- Taisto Oksanen as Alijoki
- Seumas Sargent as Doug
- Jakob Oftebro as Jack
- Troy T. Scott as Tom's man
- Werner Daehn as Müller
- Þorsteinn Bachmann as editor of the Physique Pictorial Office

== Reception ==
=== Awards ===
At the 2016 Finnish Film Affair (a "work-in-progress forum" running alongside the Helsinki International Film Festival), Tom of Finland shared the Best Pitch prize, splitting the award money with Post Punk Disorder.

At the 2017 Göteborg Film Festival, the film won the Fipresci Award.

=== Critical reception ===
On review aggregator website Rotten Tomatoes, the film has an approval rating of 83% based on 70 reviews, with an average rating of 6.9/10. The website's critics consensus reads, "Tom of Finland honors its subject with an empathetic, even-handed, and above all entertaining look at the pioneering art he produced from private turmoil." On Metacritic, the film has a weighted average score of 56 out of 100 based on 13 critics, indicating "mixed or average reviews".

== See also ==
- List of submissions to the 90th Academy Awards for Best Foreign Language Film
- List of Finnish submissions for the Academy Award for Best Foreign Language Film
