= Fanatics (2012 film) =

- Film poster
- Finnish: Kulman pojat
- Directed by: Teppo Airaksinen
- Starring: Eero Ritala; Joonas Saartamo
- Release date: 24 February 2012
- Running time: 85 minutes
- Country: Finland
- Language: Finnish

Fanatics (Finnish: Kulman pojat; lit. 'The boys of the corner') is a 2012 Finnish comedy film directed by Teppo Airaksinen.

== Cast ==
- Eero Ritala as Petri Larvio
- Joonas Saartamo as Komentaja
- Jussi Vatanen as Tuukka Tiensuu
- Lotta Kaihua as Emmi
- Ville Tiihonen as Vesander
- Janne Ravi as Sarttila
- Antti Väre as Terho
- Markus Turunen as Jari
- Samuli Niittymäki as Matias
- Eija Ahvo as Hannele
