= The Chalice of Blood =

- Poster
- Finnish: Verimalja
- Directed by: Jarno Elonen
- Written by: Pekka Rintala; Jarno Elonen
- Produced by: Pekka Rintala
- Starring: Marko Salminen; Antti Peltonen; Marko Loukaskorpi; Matti Toivio; Pasi Gerlander; Paavo Peltonen
- Cinematography: Jarno Elonen
- Edited by: Toni Tikkanen
- Music by: Heikki Kareranta
- Production companies: Autere Films; Foci-tuotanto
- Distributed by: Black Lion Pictures
- Release date: 18 August 2022 (Finland)
- Running time: 91 minutes
- Country: Finland
- Languages: Finnish, Russian, German
- Box office: $2,792

The Chalice of Blood (Finnish: Verimalja) is a 2022 Finnish independent war film directed, co-written and cinematographed by Jarno Elonen. It is set in the final years of World War II and tells the story of Finnish Sergeant Myllykoski, who, as part of the German Waffen-SS, sets out to search for the Byzantine Chalice while the Soviet NKVD threatens to complicate matters.

The film was self-produced, and its director, Elonen, has previously directed, among others, the documentary The Name of The Game. The film's initiator and main screenwriter, Rintala, has refined his knowledge in the making of the film as a Master of Theology with a background in church and military history.

The film premiered on 18 August 2022.

== Cast ==
- Marko Salminen as Juha-Matti Myllykoski
- Antti Peltonen as Pekka Lahtinen
- Marko Loukaskorpi as Veikko Koivisto
- Matti Toivio as SS Lieutenant Hauser
- Pasi Gerlander as SS Captain von Ballack
- Paavo Peltonen as SS Major Collan
- Heikki Häkkä as Bishop Alberto Argentino
- Jarno Elonen as Father Stefano Lombardus
- Grigori Tchaban as NKVD Major
- Leo Nikita Kadieff as NKVD Captain
- Jaana Joensuu as Kaarina Lahtinen
- Reijo Skog as General Schröder

The film's producer and co-writer, Pekka Rintala, also appears as the role of SS Corporal Saar.

== See also ==
- List of Finnish films of the 2020s
