= Jessica Grabowsky =

Finnish actress

- Born: 8 April 1980 (age 45); Siilinjärvi, North Savo, Finland
- Occupation: Actress
- Years active: 2006–present

Jessica Grabowsky (born 8 April 1980) is a Finnish actress. She was nominated for the Jussi Award in the category of Best Actress in a Leading Role for her performance in the 2011 film Missä kuljimme kerran. In 2014, she was nominated a second time for the Jussi Award in the same category for her lead role in 8-pallo. Grabowsky graduated from the Helsinki Theatre Academy in 2007.

== Early life ==
Born in Siilinjärvi, Grabowsky's family spoke Swedish, as her mother is a Finland Swede from Ostrobothnia. Her surname is of Polish origin, and she has Russian ancestry through her grandmother, who, along with her mother, escaped from Russia to Finland during the Russian revolution. Before her acting career, Grabowsky worked as a waitress.

== Selected filmography ==
- Ilonen talo (2006)
- Kotikatu (2009–2010)
- Missä kuljimme kerran (2011)
- Hulluna Saraan (2012)
- 8-pallo (2013)
- Tjockare än vatten (Thicker than water, TV series, 2014–2020)
- Midnattssol (Midnight Sun, 2016)
- Tom of Finland (2017)
- Bordertown, TV series, (2018–2019)
- Hidden Agenda, TV series, (2020–2023)
- Raptures (2025)
