= Miia Nuutila =

Finnish actress (born 1972)

- Born: 12 October 1972 (age 52); Forssa, Finland

Miia Nuutila (born 12 October 1972) is a Finnish television actress.

== Life ==
Nuutila was born in Forssa. In 2003, she appeared in Aarresaaren sankarit on Finnish television on MTV3.

Nuutila has appeared on a number of Finnish TV series.

== Selected filmography ==
- FC Venus (2005)
- Mystery of the Wolf (Suden arvoitus, 2006)
- Lapland Odyssey (Napapiirin sankarit, 2010)
- Lapland Odyssey 2 (Napapiirin sankarit 2, 2015)
