= Putous =

Finnish sketch comedy television show

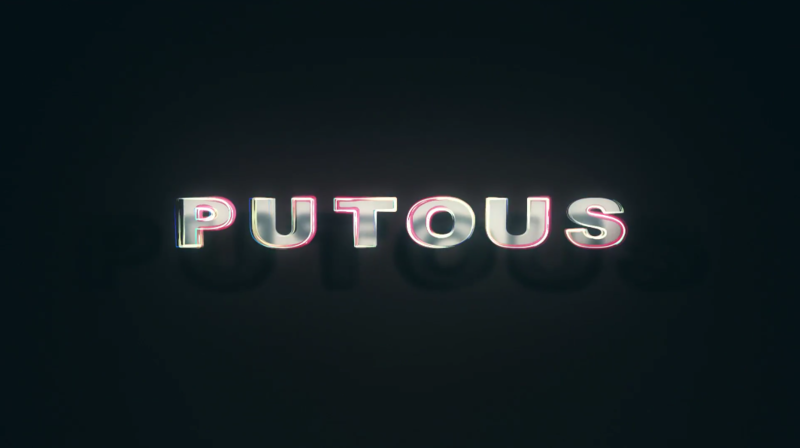
- Country of origin: Finland
- Original language: Finnish
- No. of seasons: 17 + Allstars
- No. of episodes: 138 + 4

Original release
- Network: MTV3
- Release: 9 January 2010 – present

Putous (as internationally Comedy Combat) is a Finnish sketch comedy television show. Its first broadcast was on 9 January 2010 and it's currently in its 17th season.

An Estonian version of the show, Suur Komöödiaõhtu, premiered in 2016.

== Seasons ==
=== Ratings ===
Season	Episodes	Time slot	Season premiere		Season finale		TV season	Most watched episode (in millions)
Season	Episodes	Time slot	Date	Viewers (in millions)	Date	Viewers (in millions)	TV season	Most watched episode (in millions)
1	8	Saturday 7:30 p.m.	9 January 2010	0.669	27 February 2010	0.607	2010	0.669
2	8	Saturday 7:30 p.m.	8 January 2011	0.730	26 February 2011	1.327	2011	1.327
3	8+1	Saturday 7:30 p.m.	7 January 2012	1.155	25 February 2012	1.347	2012	1.347
4	8+1	Saturday 7:30 p.m.	5 January 2013	1.275	23 February 2013	1.368	2013	1.368
5	8+1	Saturday 7:30 p.m.	11 January 2014	1.361	1 March 2014	1.453	2014 (spring)	1.538
6	8	Saturday 7:30 p.m.	11 October 2014	1.048	29 November 2014	1.091	2014 (fall/autumn)	1.091
7	8	Saturday 7:30 p.m.	24 October 2015	0.897	12 December 2015	0.786	2015	0.897
8	8	Saturday 7:30 p.m.	21 January 2017	1.100	11 March 2017	1.025	2017	1.147
9	8+1	Saturday 7:30 p.m.	20 January 2018	1.107	10 March 2018	1.155	2018 (spring)	1.155
10	8	Saturday 7:30 p.m.	20 October 2018	0.814	8 December 2018	0.778	2018 (fall/autumn)	0.843
11	8	Saturday 7:30 p.m.	16 March 2019	0.818	4 May 2019	0.589	2019	0.818
12	8	Saturday 7:30 p.m.	18 January 2020	0.895	7 March 2020	0.880	2020 (spring)	0.960
Allstars	4	Saturday 7:30 p.m.	19 September 2020	0.744	10 October 2020	0.627	2020 (fall/autumn)	0.744
13	10	Saturday 7:30 p.m.	16 January 2021	0.927	20 March 2021	0.849	2021	0.952
14	10	Saturday 7:30 p.m.	5 February 2022	0.938	9 April 2022	0.658	2022	0.938
15	8	Saturday 7:30 p.m.	21 January 2023	0.818	11 March 2023	0.671	2023	0.818
16	8	Saturday 7:30 p.m.	20 January 2024	0.830	9 March 2024	0.750	2024	0.830
17	8	Saturday 7:30 p.m.	8 February 2025	0.679	29 March 2025	0.569	2025	0.679

== Cast ==
Actor	Season																	
Actor	1	2	3	4	5	6	7	8	9	10	11	12	AS	13	14	15	16	17
Aku Hirviniemi																		
Riku Nieminen																		
Jukka Rasila																		
Krista Kosonen																		
Jaakko Saariluoma																		
Eero Ritala																		
Elina Knihtilä																		
Pirjo Lonka																		
Kari Hietalahti																		
Iina Kuustonen																		
Jussi Vatanen																		
Joanna Haartti																		
Ville Myllyrinne																		
Armi Toivanen																		
Elena Leeve																		
Jenni Kokander																		
Joonas Nordman																		
Kari Ketonen																		
Mari Perankoski																		
Ville Tiihonen																		
Essi Hellén																		
Heikki Paasonen																		
Antti Holma																		
Niina Koponen																		
Roope Salminen																		
Pilvi Hämäläinen																		
Mikko Penttilä																		
Ernest Lawson																		
Timo Lavikainen																		
Minka Kuustonen																		
Kaisa Hela																		
Kiti Kokkonen																		
Pihla Penttinen																		
Alina Tomnikov																		
Christoffer Strandberg																		
Terhi Suorlahti																		
Helmi-Leena Nummela																		
Lauren Lehtinen																		
Mikko Virtanen																		
Antti Tuomas Heikkinen																		
Linnea Leino																		
Malla Malmivaara																		
Heikki Ranta																		
Mikko Töyssy																		
Maaria Nuoranne																		
Dennis Nylund																		
Aija Pahkala																		
Pihla Maalismaa																		
Jyri Ojansivu																		
Aapo Oranen																		
Aku Sipola																		
Joonas Kääriäinen																		
Juuso "Köpi" Kallio																		
Linda Wiklund																		
Ushma Olava																		
Niina Lahtinen																		
Eino Heiskanen																		
Nicklas Pohjola																		
Miila Virtanen																		
Ville Mikkonen																		
Annika Hartikka																		
Inkeri Hyvőnen																		

= Actor

= Presenter

= Both actor and presenter

== DVDs ==
- Putous (29 April 2010) – All season episodes plus additional behind-the-scene footage
- Putous 2 (12 May 2011) – All season episodes plus additional behind-the-scene footage
- Putous 3 (14 June 2012) – All season episodes except Putous-UNICEF
- Putous 4 (5 June 2013) – All season episodes except Putous-UNICEF
- Putous 5 (7 May 2014) – All season episodes except Putous-UNICEF
