= Jussi Vatanen =

Finnish actor (born 1978)

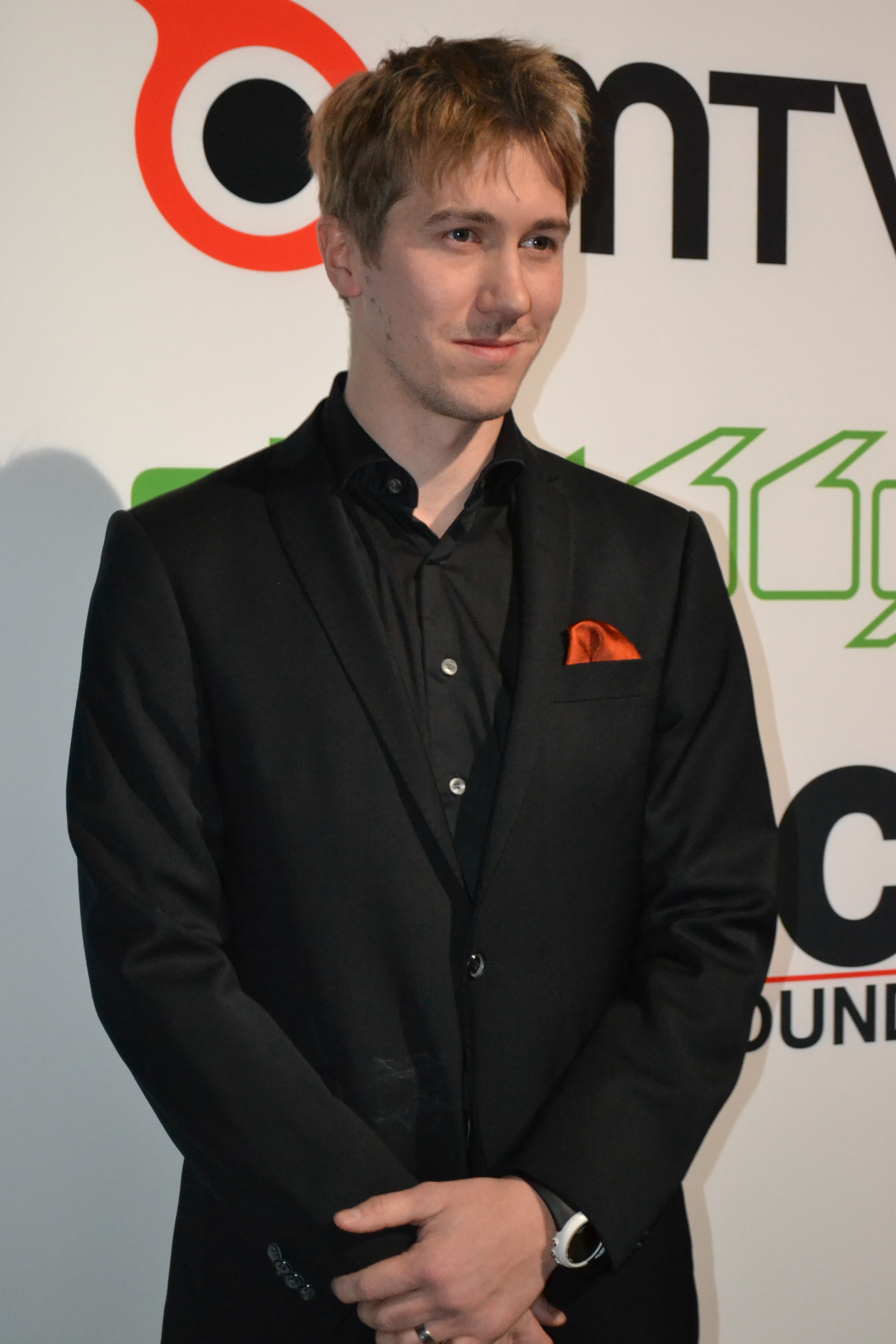
- Vatanen in 2013
- Born: January 30, 1978 (age 48); Sonkajärvi, North Savonia, Finland
- Education: Theatre Academy of Finland
- Occupation: Actor
- Years active: 2001–present
- Children: 1

Jussi Vatanen (born 1978) is a Finnish actor.

== Career ==
Vatanen graduated from Theatre Academy Helsinki in 2005 and has since then worked for several Finnish theatres. He became a household name in Finland after joining the cast of a weekly sketch comedy show Putous in its second season in 2011. In the fourth season of the show in 2013, his character Karim Z. Yskowicz was crowned as the "sketch comedy character of the year". In the fifth season in 2014, he was again crowned as the winner with his female character "Antsku". Vatanen has also appeared in other television programs and films. In 2010, he was nominated for a Jussi Award for the Best Actor in a Leading Role for his work in a Dome Karukoski film Lapland Odyssey.

== Personal life ==
He has a daughter.

== Selected filmography ==
=== In films ===
- Lapland Odyssey (2010)
- Dirty Bomb (2011)
- Risto (2011)
- Fanatics (2012)
- The Hijack That Went South (2013)
- Heart of a Lion (2013)
- Lapland Odyssey 2 (2015)
- The Unknown Soldier (2017)
- Fallen Leaves (2023)
- The Kidnapping of a President (2026)
- Red Snow (2026)

=== On television ===
- Operaatio Interheil (2001)
- Kymenlaakson laulu (2008)
- Presidentin kanslia (2008–2011)
- Putous (2011–2014)
- Mr. Mallorca kohteessa (2011)
- Kimmo (2012–2017)
- Huone 301 (English title: Man in Room 301) (2019)
- Lakeside Murders (2022)
- Piiritys (2023)
- The Man Who Died (2022, 2025)

== Discography ==
=== Albums ===
- Saletisti natsaa (2011) as Mr. Mallorca
- Olen somelainen (2013) as Karim Z. Yskowicz
