= Hannes Vartiainen and Pekka Veikkolainen =

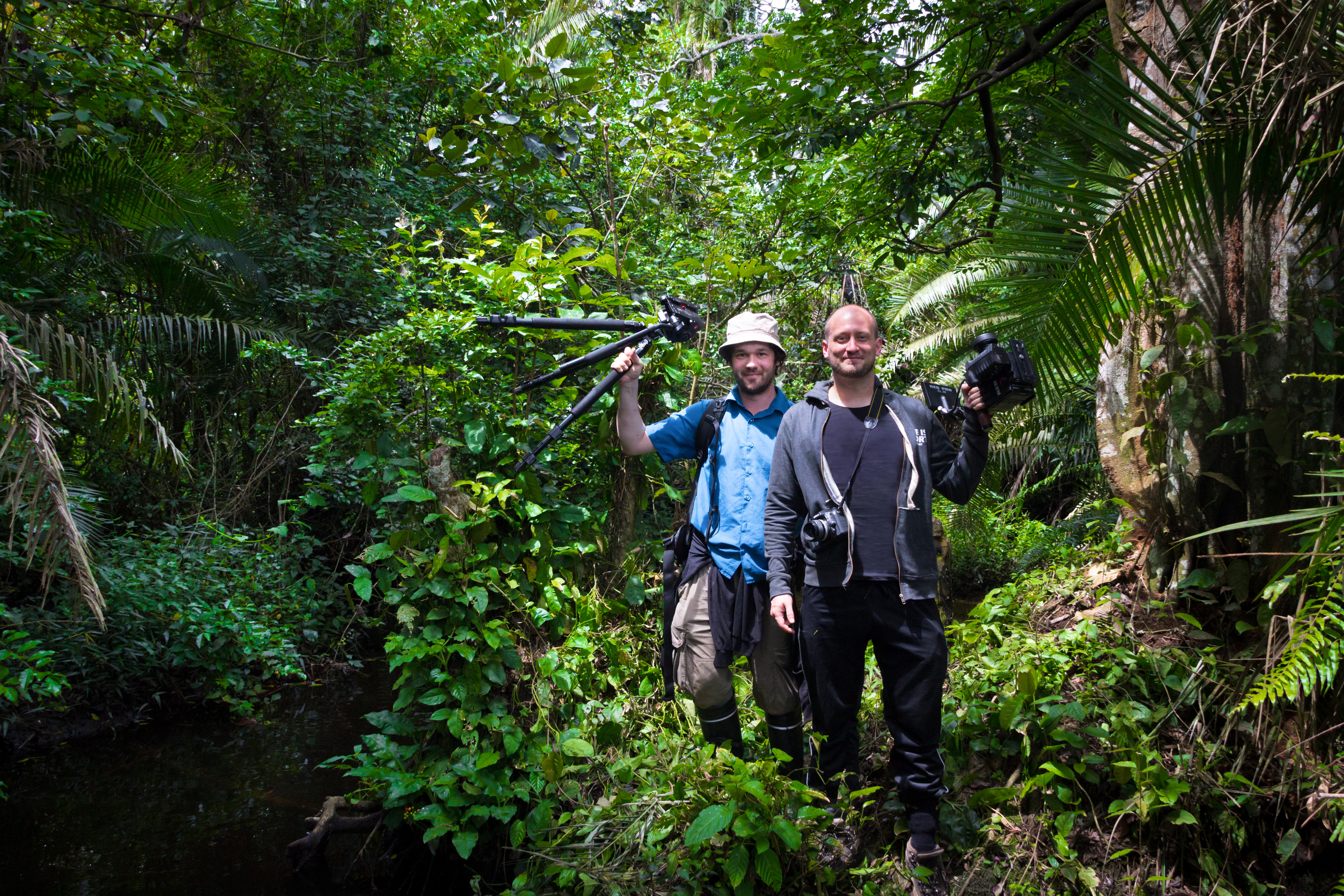
- Hannes Vartiainen and Pekka Veikkolainen shooting in Uganda in 2015
- Born: 1980 (age 44–45) and 1982 (age 42–43); Finland
- Occupation: Film directors
- Years active: 2009–present
- Website: http://www.pohjankonna.fi

Hannes Vartiainen and Pekka Veikkolainen are Finnish filmmakers.

== Biography ==
Hannes Vartiainen met Pekka Veikkolainen in Järvenpää in 1990. After finishing high school Vartiainen graduated as a film director from the Helsinki Polytechnic Stadia while Veikkolainen studied graphic design at the Aalto University School of Arts, Design and Architecture.

They have been working together since 2007, founding a production company Pohjankonna Oy in 2008 and finishing their first film in 2009. Since then they have released a number of short films (that won numerous awards and had books written about them), entered the world of fulldome films (founding Leading Note Pictures Oy in 2017) and dipped into VR.

Their frequent collaborators include Joonatan Portaankorva (who has composed and sound designed all the films) and Janne Pulkkinen (who specialises in visualising micro-CT and other forms of volumetric data).

== Filmography ==
=== Short films ===
- Hanasaari A (2009)
- The Death of an Insect / Erään hyönteisen tuho (2010)
- Gates of Life / Häivähdys elämää (2012)
- Emergency Calls / Hätäkutsu (2013)
- Finlandia review no. 701 / Finlandia-katsaus no. 701 (2017)
- Optic Identity (2017) together with Janne Pulkkinen and Huayi Wei
- Taking the Floor / Puheenvuoro (2017)

=== Fulldome films ===
- The Secret World of Moths / Yöperhosten salattu maailma (2016)
- The Baltic Sea / Itämeri (2018)
- The Embrace of the Ocean / Meren uumen (2019)
