= 8-pallo =

2013 Finnish film directed by Aku Louhimies

8-ball
- Theatrical poster
- Finnish: 8-pallo
- Directed by: Aku Louhimies
- Written by: Jari Rantala
- Based on: Crime novel by Marko Kilpi
- Produced by: Marko Antila; Tero Kaukomaa; Aku Louhimies; Yrjö Nieminen
- Starring: Jessica Grabowsky; Eero Aho; Pirkka-Pekka Petelius; Mikko Leppilampi
- Cinematography: Mika Orasmaa
- Edited by: Samu Heikkilä
- Production companies: Blind Spot Pictures Oy; Elokuvatuotantoyhtiö MJÖLK
- Distributed by: Oy Nordisk Film Ab
- Release date: 22 February 2013
- Running time: 107 minutes
- Country: Finland
- Language: Finnish

8-pallo (English: 8-ball) is a 2013 Finnish film directed by Aku Louhimies and based on a crime novel Elävien kirjoihin by Marko Kilpi.

== Plot ==
The film tells the story of a single mother Pike (Jessica Grabowsky) who, having just been released from prison, is trying to start her life anew. When her former boyfriend Lalli (Eero Aho) comes back from abroad, it opens a window into a past that Pike wants to put behind her.

== Cast ==
- Jessica Grabowsky as Pike
- Eero Aho as Lalli
- Pirkka-Pekka Petelius as Elias Kaski
- Mikko Leppilampi as Olli Repo
- Jakob Öhrman as Limppu
- Rosa Salomaa as Tiina
- Mikko Kouki as Halonen
- Max Ovaska as Tärpätti
- Kari Ketonen as Ivakka
- Kristo Salminen as Ilkka
