= Joanna Haartti =

Finnish actress

- Born: 14 April 1979 (age 47)
- Education: Helsinki Theatre Academy
- Occupation: Actress
- Partner: Minna Haapkylä

Joanna Haartti (born 14 April 1979) is a Finnish actress. She is best known for her theatrical work, but has also appeared in several films and on television.

== Overview ==
Haartti graduated from a theatrical Masters program at the Helsinki Theatre Academy in 2008. She also studied in the speech and dramatic arts program at Snellman University.

Haartti's best known roles are Sylvia in the Finnish National Theatre's production of Rakkaudesta minuun [For Love of Me] (2006), Turku City Theatre's FöriBeat, a musical (2007), the Theatre Jurkka production of Näytät vieraalta rakas [You Look Strange, Love] (2009), Marion in the Finnish National Theatre's Kristuksen Morsiamessa [The Bride of Christ] in 2010, and in the lead role as Billy Tipton in Soita minulle Billy [Call me Billy] at Theatre Jurka in 2011 and again at the 2012 Helsinki Festival. In addition, she has appeared in the films A Man's Work (2007), Prinsessa (2010), Hiljaisuus [Silence] (2011), and as the lead in Do I Have to Take Care of Everything?, an Oscar nominated short live film. On television, Haarati appeared in the 2011 season of Putous [Comedy Combat] and as one of the two leads in the television series Haamukirjoittaja [Ghostwriter].

== Personal life ==
Haartti is married to the actress Minna Haapkylä.

== Filmography ==
- A Man's Work (2007)
- Prinsessa (2010)
- Hella W (2011)
- Risto (2011)
- Hiljaisuus (2011)
- Do I Have to Take Care of Everything? (2012), nominated in 2013 for an Academy Award for Short Film (Live Action)
- Fatima (2013)
- Haamukirjoittaja (2015)
- Armi elää! (2015)
- The Happiest Day in the Life of Olli Mäki (2016)
- Tove (2020)
- The Worst Idea Ever (2023)

== Theatre and concerts ==
Year(s)	Title	Role	Venue(s)	Location
2009	In Human Disguise	Performer	Zodiak Dance Theatre	Helsinki
