= Eero Ritala =

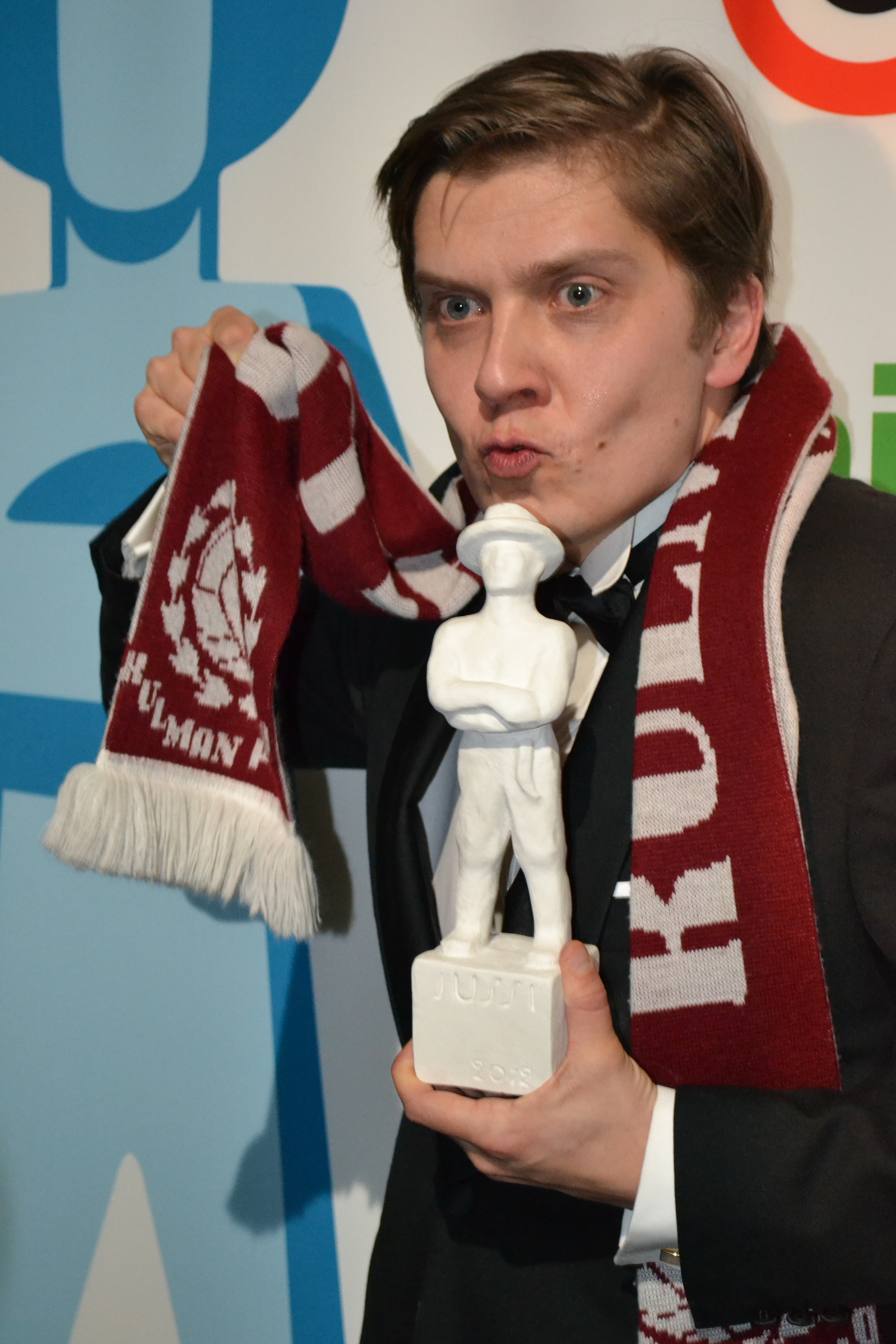
Ritala at the 2013 Jussi Awards

Eero Ritala (born 30 March 1983) is a Finnish actor.

== Career ==
After graduating from Theatre Academy Helsinki in 2008, Ritala has been seen on stage, in films and on television. He is best known for having appeared in the first season of the sketch comedy television show Putous and for his performance in a 2012 film Kulman pojat which earned him a Jussi Award for Best Actor in a Leading Role. He is also occasionally DJing under the pseudonym DJ Vauvaukki.

== Private life ==
Ritala is cohabiting with an actress Lotta Kaihua. The two appeared together in Kulman pojat.

== Selected filmography ==
=== In films ===
- Lasileuka (2004)
- Onni von Sopanen (2006)
- Veijarit (2010)
- Fanatics (2012)
- 21 tapaa pilata avioliitto (2013)
- Armi elää! (2015)

=== On television ===
- Enon varjo (1999)
- Akkaa päälle (2006)
- Uutishuone (2009)
- Ihmebantu (2009)
- Putous (2010)
- Tauno Tukevan sota (2010)
- Klikkaa mua (2011)
- Vino show (2014–present)
- Tripla (2015)
