= Beauty and the Bastard =

2005 film

- Original Finnish film poster
- Finnish: Tyttö sinä olet tähti
- Directed by: Dome Karukoski
- Written by: Pekko Pesonen
- Produced by: Aleksi Bardy
- Starring: Pamela Tola; Samuli Vauramo
- Cinematography: Pini Hellstedt
- Music by: Jukka Immonen
- Distributed by: Helsinki Filmi Oy
- Release date: 2005
- Running time: 102 minutes
- Country: Finland
- Language: Finnish

Beauty and the Bastard (Finnish: Tyttö sinä olet tähti; lit. 'Girl you are a star') is a 2005 Finnish musical romantic drama film directed by Dome Karukoski and written by Pekko Pesonen. It stars Pamela Tola and Samuli Vauramo. Eero Milonoff, Joonas Saartamo, Mikko Leppilampi and Mikko Kouki play supporting roles. It is the feature-film debut of director Dome Karukoski, who had previous experience from commercials and short films. The music was composed by Jukka Immonen's Friend Music.

In Norway the film was released as Skjønnheten og Bastarden in April 2007. The reception was universally mediocre from the biggest newspapers' critics. VG, Aftenposten, Dagbladet, Dagsavisen and Bergens Tidende all issued a "die throw" of 3.

== Cast ==
- Pamela Tola as Nelli
- Samuli Vauramo as Sune
- Joonas Saartamo as Kondis
- Eero Milonoff as Isukki
- Jussi Nikkilä as Mikko
- Elena Leeve as Mari
- Mikko Kouki as Anssi
- Mikko Leppilampi as D.T.
- Anna-Leena Härkönen as Hilkka
