= Ona Huczkowski =

Finnish actress (born 2002)

- Born: Ona Serafiina Huczkowski; 6 February 2002 (age 23); Barcelona, Spain
- Occupation: Actress

Ona Serafiina Huczkowski (born 6 February 2002 in Barcelona, Spain) is a Finnish actress. Her film debut was in the 2020 youth drama film Eden, but she got her first leading role in the 2023 western comedy film The Unhanged. In addition, she has acted in Yle's comedy drama series Riding the Beat, which is set in the rap world.

Born in Barcelona as the firstborn of an artistic family, Huczkowski moved to Finland at the age of four and they live in Vallila, Helsinki. Her mother Tiina Huczkowski's roots are partly Polish and her father David Lewis is Afro-Caribbean British. She grew up in an environment where Finnish, English and Spanish were spoken.

Huczkowski has a degree in business administration. She began acting studies at the Theatre Academy in the fall of 2024.

== Selected filmography ==
=== In films ===
- Eden (2020)
- The Unhanged (2023)
- Long Good Thursday (2024)
- Defiant (2025)

=== In television ===
- Rahti (2021)
- Riding the Beat (2022–2024)
