= The Death of an Insect =

2010 film

- Directed by: Hannes Vartiainen and Pekka Veikkolainen
- Written by: Hannes Vartiainen; Pekka Veikkolainen
- Produced by: Hannes Vartiainen; Pekka Veikkolainen
- Cinematography: Hannes Vartiainen; Pekka Veikkolainen
- Music by: Joonatan Portaankorva
- Release date: 2010
- Running time: 7 minutes
- Country: Finland

The Death of an Insect (Finnish: Erään hyönteisen tuho) is a 2010 short Finnish experimental film directed by Hannes Vartiainen and Pekka Veikkolainen. The film was created using real insects and uses a variety of animation techniques, including stop-motion and 3D models. The film contains no dialogue.
