= Return (2010 film) =

- Film poster
- Finnish: Kotiinpaluu
- Directed by: Harri J. Rantala
- Written by: Harri J. Rantala
- Produced by: Harri J. Rantala
- Starring: Eerik Kantokoski; Reeta Annala; Kalevi Haapoja; Kauko Salo
- Cinematography: Mika Vartiainen
- Edited by: Oskari Korenius; Harri J. Rantala
- Production company: Nurmo-Filmi
- Distributed by: Nurmo-Filmi
- Release date: 17 May 2010
- Running time: 20 minutes
- Country: Finland
- Language: Finnish

Return (Finnish: Kotiinpaluu), also Homecoming, is a 2010 Finnish short film directed by Harri J. Rantala and starring Eerik Kantokoski, Reeta Annala, Kalevi Haapoja and Kauko Salo.

== Plot ==
In spring 1940, a soldier is returning from the Finnish Winter War only to face the Repo man. A struggle against society, nightmares and the temptations of alcohol ensues while he strives to save his farm and marriage.

== Cast ==
- Eerik Kantokoski as Erkki
- Reeta Annala as Enni
- Kalevi Haapoja as Preacher
- Kauko Salo as Repo man
- Antti Nelimarkka as Repo man

== Film festivals ==
Return' has been screened round the world in 36 festivals in 21 countries.

=== Primary festivals ===
- 63rd Cannes Film Festival, Cannes France 2010 (Short Film Corner)
- 8th Ischia International Film Festival, Ischia Italy 2010 (Official Competition)
- 12th Motovun Film Festival, Motovun Croatia 2010 (Official Competition)
- 8th Cinefiesta International Film Festival, San Juan Puerto Rico 2010 (Official Competition)
- 6th Budapest International Short Film Festival, Budapest Hungary 2010 (Official Competition)
- 15th Ourense International Film Festival, Ourense Spain 2010 (Official Competition)
- 18th Santiago International Film Festival, Santiago Chile 2010 (Official Competition)
- 30th Amiens International Film Festival, Amiens France 2010 (Official Competition)
- 22nd Ankara International Film Festival, Ankara Turkey 2011 (Official Competition)
- 34th Grenzland-Filmtage Film Festival, Selb Germany 2011 (Official Competition)
- 2nd Vientianale International Film Festival, Vientiane Laos 2011 (Official Competition)
- 5th Portello River Film Festival, Padova Italy 2011 (Official Competition)
- 8th Golden Apricot Yerevan International Film Festival, Yerevan Armenia 2011 (Official Competition)
- 10th Dokufest International Film Festival, Prizren Kosovo 2011 (Official Competition)
- 6th Cyprus International Film Festival, Nicosia Cypros 2011 (Official Competition)
- 13th Patras City International Film Festival, Patras City Greece 2011 (Official Competition)
- 6th London Film For Peace International Film Festival, London UK 2011 (Official Competition)
- 2nd Artova Film Festival, Helsinki Finland 2011
