= American Vagabond =

- Directed by: Susanna Helke
- Produced by: Cilla Werning
- Starring: James Temple; Tyler Johnson
- Edited by: Niels Pagh Andersen
- Music by: Samuli Kosminen
- Distributed by: Suomen Elokuvakontakti (FIN)
- Release date: June 26, 2013 (Finland)
- Running time: 85 minutes
- Country: Finland
- Language: English

American Vagabond is a 2013 Finnish documentary film directed by Susanna Helke.

== Content ==
Starring James Temple and Tyler Johnson, the documentary is a story of how Temple and Johnson's move to San Francisco because Temple's parents have kicked him out of home for being gay. Very soon the city, which they had envisioned as their promised one, reveals its harsh reality as they end up homeless.

== Reception ==
The film won the Q Hugo Jury Special Prize at the Chicago International Film Festival, where it also had its North American Premier. It also won the best Documentary Film Jury Award at the Rochester ImageOut Festival. The film was nominated for the Best Nordic Documentary Film Award at the Nordisk Panorama Festival 2013 and was selected into the Masters section of the International Documentary Film Festival Amsterdam, IDFA 2013. The film was screened at the 2013 Visions du Réel festival, the DOKLeipzig International Documentary Film Festival 2013, Montreal International Documentary Festival, RIDM 2013, and many other festivals.

Farihah Zaman praised the film as a standout at the Montreal International Documentary Film Festival in her review in Filmmaker Magazine: "In Vagabond, her main subject becomes a collaborator in telling the story of his life, having crafted it over time in a series of emails with Helke. Helke also shifts perspective from one of the runaways to his mother at a crucial point, an act of compassion that breaks down the notion of easy blame or villainy as the boys are failed by one system after another. At this Canadian festival, a Finnish filmmaker shattered the illusion of the American dream."

"American Vagabond emanates from an America where parents can't reconcile ingrained religious beliefs with their homosexual, flesh-and-blood children. James' folks eventually do, but it's not the happy ending any of them (or the viewer) could have anticipated. To her credit, Helke doesn't pander to a European TV audience's appetite for reality TV-style ugliness or sordidness", Michael Fox writes in the Bay Area KQED Arts Section.

In the Finnish media Jouni Vikman, writing for Episodi.fi, gave the film four starts out five, praising Helke's ability to keep the film's focus on the subject. Leena Virtanen of Nyt, a weekly entertainment supplement to Helsingin Sanomat, similarly rated the film worth four out five stars, praising the use of difficult methods to appeal to the viewer. She also praised the cohesion of the story amid the split between the first part focusing on the couple and their soul sisters and brothers and the second, focusing on Temple's and Johnson's parents.

It was pitched prior to completion at the 2010 Sheffield Doc/Fest MeetMarket.
