= Long Range Patrol (film) =

- Original Finnish film poster
- Directed by: Harri J. Rantala
- Written by: Harri J. Rantala
- Produced by: Harri J. Rantala
- Starring: Eerik Kantokoski; Ali Ahovaara; Hannu Rantala; Kalevi Haapoja; Eeva Putro; Reeta Annala; Kauko Salo; Kristiina Karhu; Jaakko Seppä
- Cinematography: Jari Koskinen
- Edited by: Harri J. Rantala
- Production company: Nurmo-Filmi
- Distributed by: Nurmo-Filmi
- Release date: 27 December 2013
- Running time: 60 minutes
- Country: Finland
- Language: Finnish

Long Range Patrol (Finnish: Kaukopartio) is a 2013 Finnish feature film directed by Harri J. Rantala and starring Eerik Kantokoski, Ali Ahovaara, Hannu Rantala, Kalevi Haapoja and Eeva Putro. The film was filmed in Seinäjoki, Kauhava and Nurmo located in South Ostrobothnia.

== Plot ==
Long-Range Patrol is a story about the Squad Peltoniemi Patrol trip to the enemies backside in spring 1943. The capturing of a Russian female soldier changes the whole task from a routine mission to a battle for survival.

== Cast ==
- Eerik Kantokoski as Captain Erkki Peltoniemi
- Ali Ahovaara as Corporal Eero Ilkka
- Hannu Rantala as Private Tuomas Loukasmäki
- Kalevi Haapoja as Colonel Juho Loukasmäki
- Eeva Putro as Russian female soldier
- Reeta Annala as Enni Peltoniemi
- Kauko Salo as Sameli Peltoniemi
- Kristiina Karhu as Laura Peltoniemi
- Jaakko Seppä as Lieutenant Itäniemi
