= Risto Kaskilahti =

Finnish actor (born 1963)

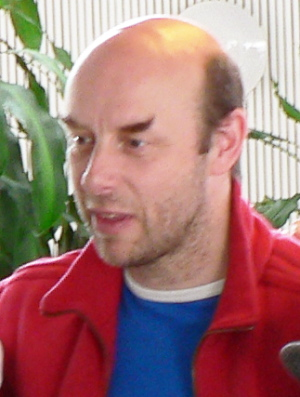
- Kaskilahti at the Helsinki City Theatre
- Born: Risto Juhani Kaskilahti; 29 January 1963 (age 63); Viitasaari, Finland
- Occupation: Actor
- Years active: 1986–present

Risto Pekka Kaskilahti (born 29 January 1963 in Viitasaari) is a Finnish actor.

Kaskilahti has worked in the Helsinki City Theatre since 2001, but he came to the public's attention as a regular competitor on Se on siinä, a humorous sports quiz show, of which he has also been a screenwriter. He has also acted in several movies and TV series. As of 2023, he had been a member of the Helsinki City Theatre ensemble for over 20 years.

In 2005, Kaskilahti was awarded his second Telvis prize. When performing on Elixir, a Finnish sports-focused TV-show, he trained with the official Finnish cross-country skiing team. Occasionally a weatherman for the channel Four news, Kaskilahti has also acted in various plays at the Helsinki City Theatre, such as Viivi & Wagner and a Beauty and the Beast musical.

Kaskilahti is married to actress Sari Puumalainen. They have two daughters.

== Filmography ==
- Risto (2011)
- Takalinjan Takana (2010)
- Blackout (2008)
- Raja 1918 (2007)
- Riemukas Robinsonin perhe (voice) (2007)
- Ice Age: The Meltdown (voice) (2006)
- Saippuaprinssi (2006)
- Tahdon asia (2005)
- Saunavuoro (2004)
- Kansankynttilät
- Sibelius (2003)
- Klassikko (2001)
- Seitsemän (2001)
- Parhaat vuodet (2000)
- Hylätyt talot, autiot pihat (2000)
- Lakeuden kutsu (2000)
- Hurmaava joukkoitsemurha (2000)
- Satumaa – Unto Monosen elämä ja tangot (1999)
- Johtaja Uuno Turhapuro – pisnismies (1998)
- Hämähäkkihuijaus (1998)
- Konstan koukkuja (1998)
- Siivoton juttu (1997)
- Aatamin poika (1996)
- Ottaako sydämestä? (1995)
- Peltiheikit (1995)
- Viimeiset siemenperunat
- Kun piru tuli polkupyörällä sepän tölliin ja sepän vaimo sai uuden nenän (1993)
- Tuntemattomalle jumalalle (1993)
- Hobitit (1993)
- Joulukalenteri (1993)
- Rölli – hirmuisia kertomuksia (1991)
- Paukavartti (early 90s)
- Yötyö (1988)
