= Risto (film) =

2011 Finnish comedy film

- Film poster
- Directed by: Tuomas Summanen
- Written by: Mikko Reitala
- Produced by: Olli Haikka; Samuli Norhomaa
- Starring: Risto Kaskilahti
- Cinematography: Arno Launos
- Release date: 25 November 2011
- Running time: 98 minutes
- Country: Finland
- Language: Finnish

Risto is a 2011 Finnish comedy film directed by Tuomas Summanen.

== Cast ==
- Risto Kaskilahti as Risto
- Krista Kosonen as Anna
- Aku Hirviniemi as Pasi G. Happonen
- Elena Leeve as Inka
- Jarkko Niemi as Akseli
- Mika Nuojua as Tuukka
- Jaakko Saariluoma as Erik
- Ville Myllyrinne as Lahnajärvi
- Jussi Vatanen as Agentti
- Elina Knihtilä as Pankinjohtaja
- Kari Ketonen as Apulaisohjaaja
- Joanna Haartti as Ala-asteen opettaja
