= Harri J. Rantala =

Finnish film director (born 1980)

- Born: 2 October 1980 (age 45); Nurmo, Finland
- Occupation: Film director
- Years active: 2000–present
- Known for: Return; Nurmoo – Shout from the plain
- Website: Official website

Harri J. Rantala (born 2 October 1980) is a Finnish film director. He has directed films like Kotiinpaluu – Return and Nurmoo – Shout from the plain. He is a native of Nurmo, Finland.

== Filmography ==
Director:

- 2004: The Sacrifice
- 2005: The Road of Mutala
- 2006: Suudelma
- 2006: M. A. Numminen: Sedena con la mia donnna nel parco del parlamento
- 2007: Daughters of Snow
- 2009: Nurmoo – Shout from the plain
- 2010: Return
- 2013: Long Range Patrol
- 2015: Midsummer girl
- 2015: Puppeteer

Actor:

- 2000: Pieni pyhiinvaellus
- 2002: Luokkajuhla
- 2005: The Road of Mutala
- 2007: Colorado Avenue
- 2007: Black Ice
- 2009: Nurmoo – Shout from the plain
- 2011: One Man's Movie
- 2012: Once Upon a Time in the North

Miscellaneous Crew:

- 2005: Jopet Show
- 2005: Piilopaikka kahdelle
- 2006: Ilonen talo
- 2006: Mystery of the Wolf
- 2007: The New Mankind
- 2007: Colorado Avenue
- 2007: Ganes
- 2008: Protectors
- 2008. Joku kaltaiseni
- 2008 Tears of April
- 2008 Tukka auki
