= Insanity (2019 film) =

2019 Finnish horror film by Miska Kajanus

- International film poster
- Finnish: Vihanpidot
- Directed by: Miska Kajanus
- Written by: Miska Kajanus
- Produced by: Antti-Veikko Salo; Vera Melleri
- Starring: Alina Tomnikov; Hanna Angelvuo; Karlo Haapiainen; Saara Inari; Henry Pöyhiä
- Cinematography: Eero Heinonen
- Edited by: Miska Kajanus; Vertti Virkajärvi
- Music by: Jukka Åkerman
- Production companies: Piilo Productions; Common Ground Media; Rainy Day Entertainment Oy
- Distributed by: Black Lion Pictures (Finland); BayView Entertainment (US & UK)
- Release dates: 20 October 2019 (Marina del Rey); 14 February 2020
- Running time: 75 minutes
- Country: Finland
- Language: Finnish

Insanity (Finnish: Vihanpidot; literally translated "The Feuding") is a 2019 Finnish found footage horror film written and directed by Miska Kajanus. The film tells the story of how friendships are sorely tested over a weekend spent on an enigmatic getaway trip. The film's actors include Alina Tomnikov, Hanna Angelvuo, Karlo Haapiainen, Saara Inari and Henry Pöyhiä.

The film had its world premiere in the United States at the Marina del Rey Film Festival on October 20, 2019. It had its theatrical premiere in Finland on February 14, 2020.

A sequel is being planned for the film, which will be filmed in the United States.

== Premise ==
A group of friends head to an island for a getaway, class reunion, and a night of partying. During the fateful evening, the past begins to haunt them and old grudges from their shared past come to the surface. As the night turns awry, they start to fear there might also be something else on the island besides them. During one bloody night, old scores are settled, everything is brought to the surface, and revenge is undertaken.

== Cast ==
- Alina Tomnikov as Vivi
- Hanna Angelvuo as Sanni
- Karlo Haapiainen as Leo
- Saara Inari as Jane
  - Elsa Sulavuori as young Jane
- Henry Pöyhiä as Tomi
- Anna Sulavuori as Elli
- Ilona Chevakova as Jane's mother
