= Dirty Bomb (film) =

2011 film

- Directed by: Elias Koskimies
- Written by: Elias Koskimies
- Produced by: Jarkko Hentula
- Starring: Malla Malmivaara
- Cinematography: Henri Blomberg
- Release date: 23 September 2011
- Running time: 90 minutes
- Country: Finland
- Language: Finnish

Dirty Bomb (Finnish: Likainen pommi) is a 2011 Finnish comedy film written and directed by Elias Koskimies.

== Cast ==
- Malla Malmivaara as Mirccu
- Jukka Puotila as Martin Bakka
- Ilkka Villi as Roba
- Iida Lampela as PD
- Niina Herala as Laura Melanie
- Jussi Vatanen as Jali
