= Games People Play (film) =

2020 Finnish film

- Finnish: Seurapeli
- Directed by: Jenni Toivoniemi
- Written by: Jenni Toivoniemi
- Produced by: Venla Hellstedt; Elli Toivoniemi
- Starring: Emmi Parviainen; Paula Vesala; Eero Milonoff
- Cinematography: Jarmo Kiuru
- Edited by: Samu Heikkilä
- Production company: Tuffi Films
- Distributed by: Nordisk Film
- Release date: 29 January 2020 (Gôteborg)
- Running time: 117 minutes
- Country: Finland
- Languages: Finnish; Swedish; English

Games People Play (Finnish: Seurapeli) is a Finnish comedy-drama film, directed by Jenni Toivoniemi and released in 2020. Her full-length directorial debut, the film centres on a group of old friends who gather for the 40th birthday of Mitzi (Emmi Parviainen), and regress into their old and immature youthful patterns as they interact.

The cast also includes Paula Vesala, Eero Milonoff, Laura Birn, Samuli Niittymäki, Iida-Maria Heinonen and Christian Hillborg.

The film premiered on 29 January 2020 in the Nordic Competition at the Gothenburg Film Festival.

== Awards ==
Award	Date of ceremony	Category	Recipient(s)	Result	Ref.
Jussi Awards	2021	Best Film	Venla Hellstedt, Elli Toivoniemi	Nominated	
Jussi Awards	2021	Best Director	Jenni Toiviniemi	Nominated	
Jussi Awards	2021	Best Actress	Emmi Parviainen	Nominated	
Jussi Awards	2021	Best Supporting Actor	Samuli Niittymäki	Won	
Jussi Awards	2021	Best Supporting Actress	Iida-Maria Heinonen	Nominated	
Jussi Awards	2021	Best Screenplay	Jenni Toiviniemi	Won	
Jussi Awards	2021	Best Editing	Samu Heikkilä	Nominated	
Jussi Awards	2021	Best Costume Design	Jouni Mervas	Nominated	
