= Pekka Strang =

Finnish actor (born 1977)

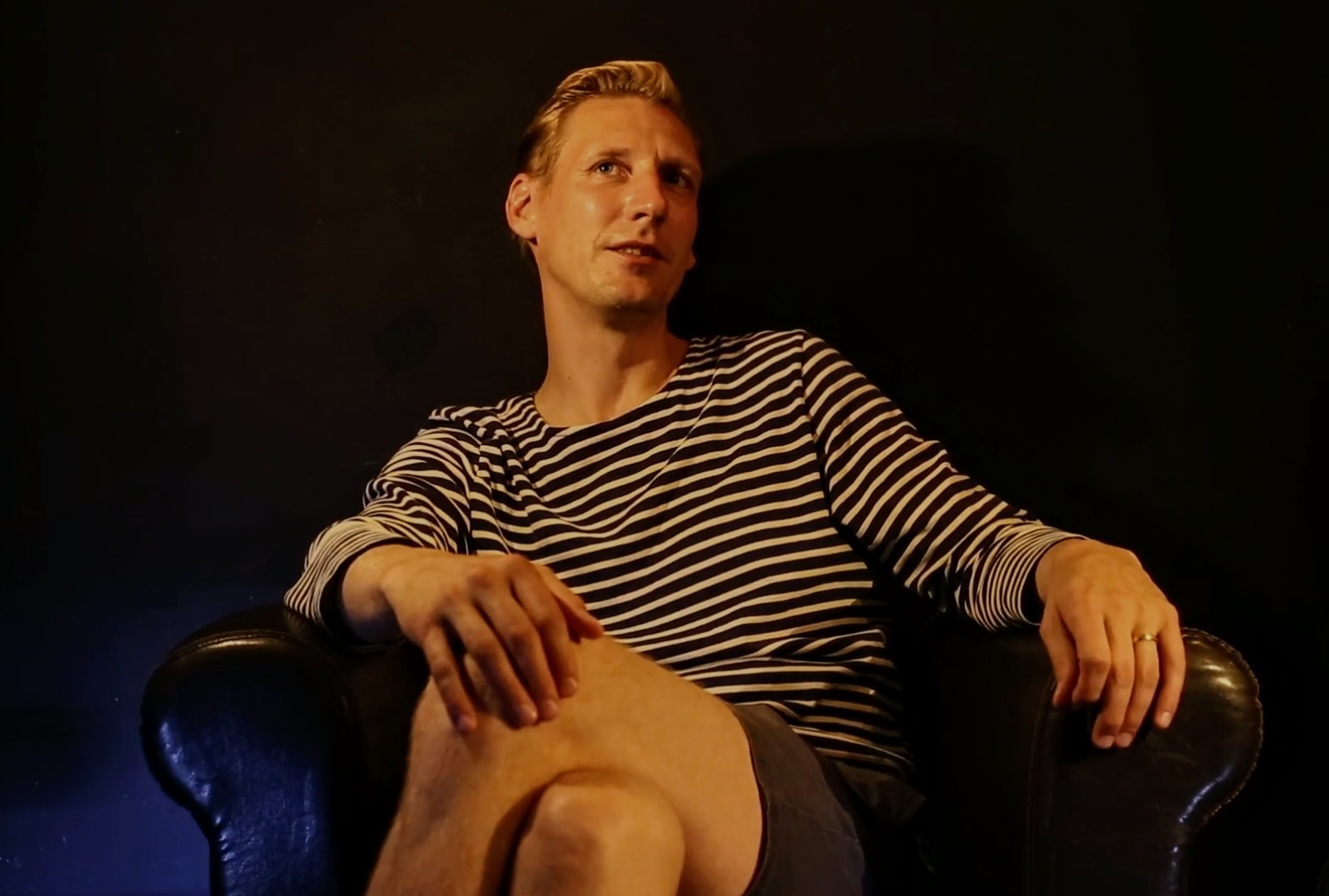
- Strang in 2017
- Born: Pekka Kristian Strang; 23 July 1977 (age 49); Helsinki, Finland
- Education: Theatre Academy
- Occupations: Actor, theatre director
- Years active: 2001–present
- Awards: Jussi Award for Best Actor (2020)

Pekka Kristian Strang (born 23 July 1977) is a Finland-Swedish actor. From 2005 to 2014 he was artistic director of Lilla Teatern, the Swedish-language stage of the Helsinki City Theatre. He played the title role of Touko Laaksonen in Tom of Finland (2017), and won the Jussi Award for Best Actor in 2020 for Dogs Don't Wear Pants (2019).

== Early life and education ==
Strang was born in Helsinki. He grew up in Vaasa on the Finnish west coast. His brother is the journalist Janne Strang. Strang studied at the Theatre Academy from 1997 to 2001. While still a student, he was cast as Dani in Drakarna över Helsingfors (English title: Kites over Helsinki), his first major film role.

== Career ==
=== Theatre ===
After graduating, Strang worked at the Swedish Theatre (Svenska Teatern) in Helsinki. There he appeared opposite Sampo Sarkola in the Irish comedy Stones in His Pockets (2001). He also played Jonatan in The Brothers Lionheart (2002) and Jamie in Long Day's Journey into Night (2003).

In 2005 Lilla Teatern was merged into the Helsinki City Theatre, and Strang became its artistic director the same year. The theatre was then in financial difficulty and losing its audience. Strang later said that in his first years he "played theatre director" as a role, since he had been trained as an actor but not to lead an organisation. (Note: Swedish original: spelade teaterchef.) In November 2012 he announced that he would step down to concentrate on acting, and in spring 2014 he was succeeded by the director Raila Leppäkoski. In autumn 2014 he again appeared opposite Sarkola, in Kredit at Lilla Teatern.

In 2025 Strang appeared in a stage adaptation of George Orwell's Nineteen Eighty-Four, directed by Sara Cronberg at Kulturhuset Stadsteatern in Stockholm, Sweden.

=== Film and television ===
After his debut in Drakarna över Helsingfors, Strang appeared in Producing Adults (2004) and Colorado Avenue (2007). He played the title role of Touko Laaksonen in Dome Karukoski's biographical film Tom of Finland (2017). Several of the film's main roles were played by Finland-Swedish actors. For his leading role in Dogs Don't Wear Pants (2019) he received the Jussi Award for Best Actor in 2020.

Strang voices the male Hemulen in the Finland-Swedish version of the animated series Moominvalley (2019–). In the Swedish crime series Bäckström (2020, 2022, 2024) he played the Stockholm police chief Toivonen. He had the leading role of the hearse driver Risto Kivi in Teemu Nikki's Peluri – kuolema on elävien ongelma (2023). He played Anlaf in the Netflix film The Last Kingdom: Seven Kings Must Die (2023). In the international adaptation of Tove Jansson's The Summer Book (2024) he played Malander. In Täydelliset vieraat (2025), the Finnish remake of the Italian film Perfect Strangers, he played the host Valtteri. In May 2026 it was reported that he would appear in the fourth season of the American series The White Lotus.

In 2021 Strang played the lead in the music video for the Beast in Black song "Moonlight Rendezvous". In 2018 he was one of the hosts of Svenska Yle's summer radio series Sommarpratare.

== Personal life ==
Strang is married and has three sons.

== Selected filmography ==
=== Film ===
Year	Title	Role	Notes
2001	Drakarna över Helsingfors	Dani	
2004	Producing Adults	Miro	
2007	Colorado Avenue		
2017	Tom of Finland	Touko Laaksonen	
2019	Dogs Don't Wear Pants		Jussi Award for Best Actor
2023	Peluri – kuolema on elävien ongelma	Risto Kivi	
2024	The Summer Book	Malander	
2025	Täydelliset vieraat	Valtteri	

=== Television ===
Year	Title	Role	Notes
2019	Aktivistit	Alexander Tunzelman von Adlerflug	
2019–	Moominvalley	Hemulen (voice)	Finland-Swedish version
2026	The White Lotus		Season 4

== Selected stage roles ==
Year	Title	Role	Theatre
2001	Stones in His Pockets		Svenska Teatern
2002	The Brothers Lionheart	Jonatan	Svenska Teatern
2003	Long Day's Journey into Night	Jamie	Svenska Teatern
2014	Kredit		Lilla Teatern
2025	Nineteen Eighty-Four		Kulturhuset Stadsteatern
