= Lapland Odyssey =

2010 Finnish comedy film

- Finnish poster
- Finnish: Napapiirin sankarit
- Directed by: Dome Karukoski
- Written by: Pekko Pesonen
- Produced by: Aleksi Bardy
- Starring: Jussi Vatanen; Jasper Pääkkönen; Timo Lavikainen; Pamela Tola; Kari Ketonen; Miia Nuutila
- Cinematography: Pini Hellstedt
- Edited by: Harri Ylönen
- Music by: Lance Hogan
- Production companies: Helsinki Filmi Oy; Anagram Produktion; Ripple World Pictures
- Distributed by: Sandrew Metronome Distribution; DistriB Films
- Release dates: 16 September 2010 (Toronto); 15 October 2010 (Finland)
- Running time: 92 minutes
- Country: Finland
- Language: Finnish
- Budget: €1,700,000
- Box office: $4,762,640

Lapland Odyssey (Finnish: Napapiirin sankarit) is a 2010 Finnish comedy film directed by Dome Karukoski. The film stars Jussi Vatanen, Jasper Pääkkönen, Timo Lavikainen, Pamela Tola, Kari Ketonen and Miia Nuutila. The film premiered at the 2010 Toronto International Film Festival.

The film's sequel, Lapland Odyssey 2, was released in 2015.

== Cast ==
- Jussi Vatanen as Janne
- Jasper Pääkkönen as Kapu
- Timo Lavikainen as Räihänen
- Pamela Tola as Inari
- Kari Ketonen as Pikku-Mikko
- Miia Nuutila as Marjukka

== Plot ==
After a man called Janne living in Lapland in Northern Finland fails to acquire a digital television adapter for his wife from the local utility store due to not reaching it before closure time, he sets out with his two friends in the middle of the night to get one by any means necessary. He sets up a late rendezvous with his father-in-law who owns an electronics store in Rovaniemi, several hundred kilometers away. Naturally nothing is ever simple and along the way, the trio end up having several comedic misadventures.

== Awards and nominations ==
Alpe d'Huez International Comedy Film Festival

Year	Nominee / work	Award	Result
2011	Lapland Odyssey	Grand Prix	Won
2011	Lapland Odyssey	Coup de cœur	Won

Festróia - Tróia International Film Festival

Year	Nominee / work	Award	Result
2011	Pini Hellstedt (Best Cinematography)	Silver Dolphin	Won
2011	Lapland Odyssey (Best Film)	Golden Dolphin	Nominated

Irish Film and Television Awards

Year	Nominee / work	Award	Result
2011	Lance Hogan (Best Original Score)	IFTA Award	Nominated

The film also won four Jussi Awards and was nominated in three categories.
