= Kari Ketonen =

Finnish actor

Kari Mikael Ketonen (born 16 August 1971) is a Finnish actor.

== Life and career ==
Born in Espoo, he portrayed the president of Russia Vladimir Putin in the sketch comedy television show Putous in 2014. He also played Putin in the film Iron Sky: The Coming Race.

== Putin sketch ==
Television show Putous sketch was shown on MTV3 on November 15, 2014. The president of Finland Sauli Niinistö (Joonas Nordman) and the prime minister of Finland Alexander Stubb (Antti Holma) are discussing about politics in advance of the president of Russia Vladimir Putin (Kari Ketonen). Svetlana Rönkkö (Jenni Kokander) is translating Putin.

== Selected filmography ==
=== Film ===
- Luottomies-elokuva: All In (2024)
- The Potato Venture (2021)
- The Renovation (2020)
- Iron Sky: The Coming Race (2019)
- Lapland Odyssey 2 (2015)
- The Grump (2014)
- 8-pallo (2013)
- Eine Insel namens Udo (2011)
- Hiljaisuus (2011)
- Lapland Odyssey (2010)
- Risto (2011)
- Sauna (2008)
- Tali-Ihantala 1944 (2007)
- Pelicanman (2004)

=== Television ===
- Arctic Circle (since 2020)
- Luottomies
- Putous (2014)
- Kimmo (since 2012)
