= The Worst Idea Ever =

- Järjettömän paska idea
- Directed by: Pamela Tola
- Written by: Pamela Tola
- Produced by: Aleksi Bardy; Anniina Leppänen
- Starring: Alina Tomnikov; Iina Kuustonen; Chike Ohanwe; Mikko Kauppila; Joanna Haartti; Lotta Lehtikari; Leea Klemola; Lauri Maijala
- Cinematography: Arsen Sarkisiants
- Edited by: Antti Reikko
- Music by: Salla Luhtala
- Production companies: Helsinki-filmi; Aurora Studios
- Distributed by: Aurora Studios
- Release date: 13 January 2023
- Running time: 107 minutes
- Country: Finland
- Language: Finnish
- Budget: €1.625 million

The Worst Idea Ever (Finnish: Järjettömän paska idea) is a 2023 Finnish drama film written and directed by Pamela Tola. The film stars Alina Tomnikov and Iina Kuustonen as the leads and follows the story of two friends, Ripe (Tomnikov) and Noora (Kuustonen), who work as video game designers. Other cast members include Chike Ohanwe, Mikko Kauppila, Joanna Haartti, Lotta Lehtikari, Leea Klemola, and Lauri Maijala.

The film premiered in Finland on January 13, 2023. It was produced by Aleksi Bardy and Anniina Leppänen under Helsinki-filmi and Aurora Studios and distributed by Aurora Studios.

== Plot ==
The story focuses on Ripe and Noora, best friends and colleagues in the video game industry. Their bond and professional lives are tested by personal and professional challenges as they navigate a male-dominated field and their own complex lives.

== Production ==
The film was produced by Aleksi Bardy and Anniina Leppänen. Salla Luhtala composed the music, Arsen Sarkisiants was the cinematographer, Antti Reikko handled editing, and Kari Kankaanpää served as production designer.

The film's budget was €1.625 million, of which €500,000 was provided by the Finnish Film Foundation. It was shot primarily in the Helsinki area.

== Reception ==
The Worst Idea Ever received mixed reviews from critics. While some praised the performances and themes, others criticized its uneven pacing and narrative structure. The film was Finland's ninth most-watched movie during its opening weekend, with 4,992 viewers. It attracted a total of 17,086 viewers during its theatrical run.

== Cast ==
- Alina Tomnikov as Ripe
- Iina Kuustonen as Noora
- Chike Ohanwe as Sampsa
- Mikko Kauppila as Poju
- Lauri Maijala as Juho
- Leea Klemola as Kaija, Ripe's mother
- Joanna Haartti as Elisa
- Lotta Lehtikari as Merituuli
- Kärdo Shiwan as Vishal
