= Emmi Parviainen =

Finnish actress (born 1985)

- Born: November 8, 1985 (age 40); Hämeenlinna, Finland
- Occupation: Actress

Emmi Parviainen (born 8 November1985) is a Finnish actress. She was born in Hämeenlinna, Finland. From 2004 to 2007, she had a supporting role in the popular Finnish soap opera Salatut Elämät, Concealed Lives, playing the character Annika Sievinen. In 2018, she was in a Finnish National Theatre production of Three Sisters directed by Paavo Westerberg. She played Laina in The Eternal Road (2017). She played Johanna in the thriller series Transport (2022).

== Filmography ==
- Games People Play (Seurapeli) - 2020
