= Timo Lavikainen =

Finnish actor

Timo Lavikainen (born 1972) is a Finnish actor. He lives in Joensuu.

== Filmography ==
Year	Title	Role
1999	Pitkä kuuma kesä	Kukkonen
2003	Helmiä ja sikoja	Ruho
2004	Koirankynnen leikkaaja	Leinonen
2008	8 päivää ensi-iltaan	Gil
2010	Lapland Odyssey	Räihänen
2013	Leijonasydän	Olli
2015	Lapland Odyssey 2	Räihänen
2017	Putous	himself, many roles
2017	Lapland Odyssey 3	Räihänen
