= Dome Karukoski =

Finnish film director (born 1976)

- Karukoski in 2026.
- Born: Thomas August George Karukoski; 29 December 1976 (age 49); Nicosia, Cyprus
- Children: 2
- Relatives: George Dickerson (father)

Thomas August George Dome Karukoski (Finnish pronunciation: [ˈdome ˈkɑruˌkoski]; born 29 December 1976) is a Finnish film director. He has won over 30 festival awards and having directed six feature films that became blockbusters in his home country and also received international recognition.

== Early life and education ==
Karukoski was born in Nicosia, Cyprus to Swedish-speaking Finnish journalist Ritva Karukoski and American actor George Dickerson. He moved to Finland from Cyprus with his mother when he was 5 years old. Karukoski met his father the first time when he was 14 years old.

Karukoski has been very open in public about his childhood when he was bullied in school between the ages 7 and 14. The bullying started after he moved from Cyprus to Finland. Because of his experiences he has taken part of numerous events and projects that are against bullying in schools.

In 1999, Karukoski was one of only three new students admitted to the University of Art and Design Helsinki to major in directing; he had had no former experience in directing or holding a camera.

== Career ==
=== Beauty and the Bastard ===
Karukoski's debut feature Beauty and the Bastard (Tyttö sinä olet tähti) showed at the Berlin International Film Festival and Tribeca Film Festival in 2006. The film, which stars Pamela Tola, concerns young people in Finland who are caught between conventional careers and more alternative forms of living. The film's score contains contemporary Finnish pop music, particularly hip-hop and rap music. Beauty and the Bastard won the Norwegian National Film Prize Amanda sponsored by Canal+ & Svensk Filmindustri AB for best Nordic Debut-Film. Beauty and the Bastard was also nominated in eight categories for the Finnish National Film Awards Jussi Award including nominations for Best film and Best director. It won the Audience Award and the prize for Best Music.

=== The Home of Dark Butterflies ===
Karukoski's second feature film The Home of Dark Butterflies (Tummien perhosten koti) premiered in Finland January 2008. It is a drama about Juhani, a 13-year-old castaway sent to a home for boys on an island. The Home of Dark Butterflies was nominated in ten categories for the Finnish National Film Awards, and this time Karukoski won the prize for the Best Director. The Home of Dark Butterflies was also chosen as Finland's representative for both The Nordic Council Film Prize and the Academy Awards.

Dome Karukoski in 2026.

=== Forbidden Fruit ===
Karukoski's third feature film Forbidden Fruit (Kielletty hedelmä) premiered in February 2009. Forbidden Fruit is a coming of age story about two girls who are a part of a religious sect called the Conservative Laestadianism. The film had its world premiere at the Gothenburg Film Festival. It was then shown in other prestigious film festivals, such as Karlovy Vary International Film Festival and Shanghai International Film Festival and won numerous festival awards. Forbidden Fruit received theatrical distribution in France and Poland. Karukoski was again nominated for Best director in the Finnish national film awards.

=== Lapland Odyssey ===
Karukoski's fourth film was Lapland Odyssey, a comedy about three unemployed men setting out to find a digital TV terminal in Lapland. The road trip comedy premiered at the Toronto International Film Festival and became the number one box-office film of the year 2010 in Finland beating such titles as Harry Potter and the Deathly Hallows – Part 1, Sex and the City 2 and Alice in Wonderland. In France the film was distributed widely in cinemas with the title Very Cold Trip. In Germany and Austria the title was Helden des Polarkreises which is a direct translation of the film's Finnish title Napapiirin sankarit. The original title translates literally into English as Heroes of the Arctic Circle. Lapland Odyssey won awards in several film festivals and received four Finnish National Film Awards, including prizes for Best film and Best director.

=== Burungo (short) ===
In 2010, Karukoski wrote and directed a fictional short film Burungo together with actress Pamela Tola. The film handles poverty and the sexuality of young girls in the slums of Nairobi, the capital of Kenya. The word Burungo means both girl and commodity in the street language Sheng, spoken in the slums of Nairobi.

=== Mannerheim film (not made) ===
In August 2011, Karukoski was announced as the new director of a film about Baron C. G. E. Mannerheim, after Hollywood director Renny Harlin left the project. Mannerheim is seen as the greatest war hero in Finland. The film has not yet been made, as it has struggled for years to raise its 15 million dollar budget. If completed, the film would be the most expensive Finnish film ever.

=== Heart of a Lion ===
Karukoski's fifth film is Heart of a Lion (Leijonasydän) in which a neo-Nazi leader (played by Peter Franzén) falls in love with a woman who has a black son. It had its world premiere at the Toronto International Film Festival in 2013. Heart of a Lion premiered in Finland October 18 and was an instant success at the box office defeating films such as Gravity, Thor: The Dark World and Now You See Me. Karukoski was again nominated for Best Director in the Finnish Film Awards.

=== The Grump ===
Karukoski's sixth release Mielensäpahoittaja, titled in English The Grump, premiered at the Toronto International Film Festival in 2014. The Grump is a tragicomedy with a retired main protagonist based on a book series written by Tuomas Kyrö. It was an enormous hit in Finland, earning gross revenues placing it in the top 3 Finnish films of the past 25 years. The film got the Box office number one spot of the year, beating blockbuster titles including The Hobbit: The Battle of the Five Armies. The Grump was nominated for Best Film, Best Director and Best Actor in a Leading Role at the Finnish Film Awards and won the award for Best Actor. With his nomination for the Best Director award, Dome Karukoski became the first Finnish film director ever to be nominated for every one of his first six feature films.

=== Tom of Finland ===
Karukoski's seventh release is a biopic of the life of iconic gay fetish artist Touko Laaksonen, which came out in 2017. This project was announced at the 2013 Toronto International Film Festival.

=== Tolkien ===
Karukoski directed a 2019 film about author J. R. R. Tolkien, depicting his formative years as a teenager and as young man during the First World War. The film was made by Chernin Entertainment for Fox Searchlight.

== Reception ==
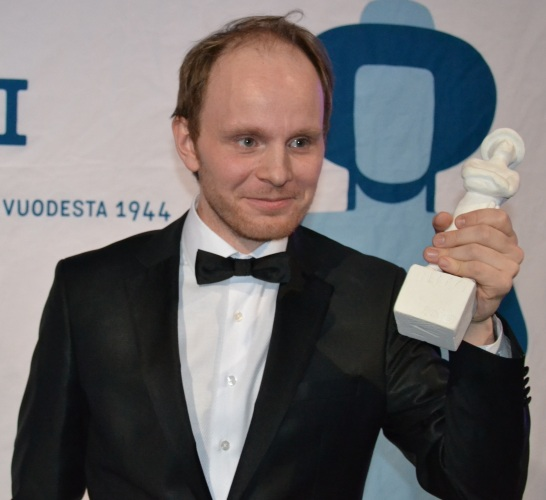
Dome Karukoski in Jussi Award 2011.

Karukoski's films have been well-received both at the box office and by film critics. After Beauty and the Bastard was released in Finland, Markus Määttänen, one of the most respected film critics in Finland called Karukoski "The savior of Finnish cinema".

In Finland Karukoski is a household name being a regular guest in radio and TV talk shows.

He caused a small stir at the Finnish Film Awards in 2009 when he kissed the prime minister of Finland on the cheek when receiving the Audience Award for Home of the Dark Butterflies. His comment during the aftermath was: "People in Finland should kiss more".

In 2009, Karukoski was invited by the President of Finland Tarja Halonen to attend Finland's Independence Day Reception at the Presidential Palace. The President invites artists, athletes, academics and public figures who are highly acclaimed in their profession and invitations are regarded as a great honour.

In 2013, the U.S. magazine Variety named Karukoski in its list of 10 Directors to Watch. This was the first time a Finnish director was included on the list, which covers the whole world.

Karukoski is the only Finnish director to win the main award in all of the National Finnish Film Awards: Jussi Award for Best Film Lapland Odyssey in 2011, Venla Award for Best TV series with Suojelijat and The Golden Peak Award for the Best TV commercial in 2011 with MTV3 MAX : Man's road.

== Personal life ==
In 2013, Karukoski married his long-time partner Nadia and they have two children: Oliver and Isabel. In 2023 in a radio interview for the Finnish YLE, Karukoski revealed that the couple divorced.

Karukoski is a Finland-Swede through his mother. His father was an American.

== Filmography ==
=== Film ===
- Beauty and the Bastard (Tyttö sinä olet tähti) (2005)
- The Home of Dark Butterflies (Tummien perhosten koti) (2008)
- Forbidden Fruit (Kielletty hedelmä) (2009)
- Lapland Odyssey (Napapiirin sankarit) (2010)
- Burungo (2011)
- Heart of a Lion (Leijonasydän) (2013)
- The Grump (Mielensäpahoittaja) (2014)
- Tom of Finland (2017)
- Tolkien (2019)
- Little Siberia (2025)

=== Television ===
- Suojelijat (Episodes 2 and 5, 2008)
- Veljet (2008)
- Maailmanparantaja (2010)
- The Beast Must Die (2021)

=== Music videos ===
- Jenni Vartiainen: Tunnoton (2007)
