= Kotikatu =

Finnish drama television series

- Genre: Drama
- Starring: Jukka Puotila; Ville Keskilä; Anitta Niemi; Lena Meriläinen; Misa Nirhamo; Tiina Rinne; Pirjo Moilanen; Risto Autio; Sulevi Peltola; Eeva Litmanen; Laura Malmivaara; Aake Kalliala; Ria Kataja
- Country of origin: Finland
- Original language: Finnish
- No. of episodes: 588

Original release
- Network: Yle TV1
- Release: August 24, 1995 – December 7, 2012

Kotikatu (The Home Street) is a Finnish drama television series which aired on Yle TV1 from August 24, 1995 to December 7, 2012. Kotikatu was titled as "a semi-soap opera". It is the second longest running Finnish drama television series after soap opera Salatut elämät.

One of the directors of Kotikatu includes Aku Louhimies before the peak of his film career.
