= Pamela Tola =

Finnish actress and director (born 1981)

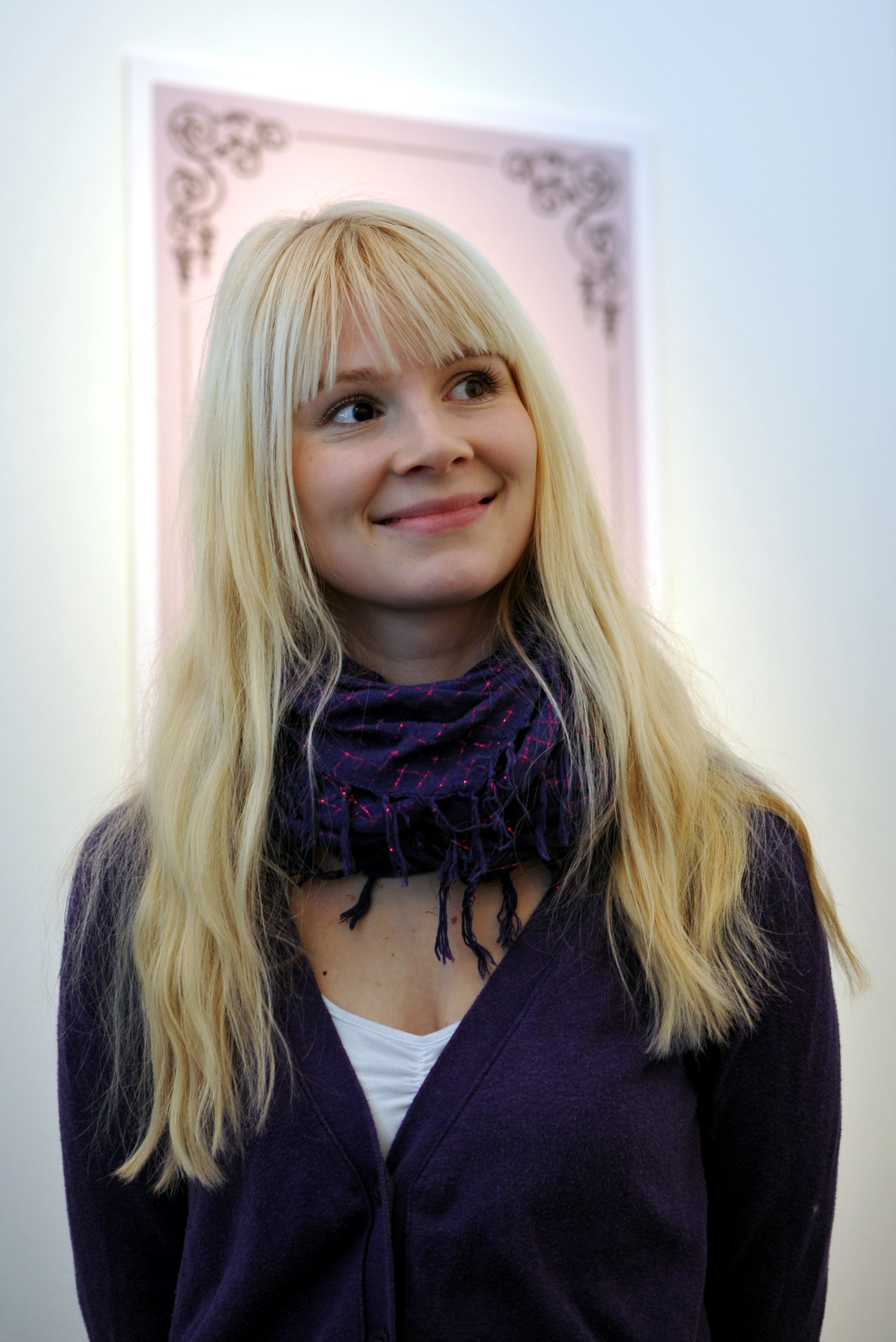
Pamela Tola in 2010

Pamela Tola (born 15 October 1981) is a Finnish actress and director.

Tola was born in Ruotsinpyhtää, Finland. She has appeared on television since 2003. She appeared in the 2005 film Paha maa (Frozen Land), and starred as the main character in the 2006 film Saippuaprinssi (Soap Prince), both times working with Mikko Leppilampi. In 2008, Tola graduated with MA from the Theatre Academy's Department of Theatre and Drama. In 2018, she directed her first feature film Swingers, followed by Ladies of Steel in 2020.

== Personal life ==
Tola and her film producer husband Pauli Waroma filed for divorce in August 2011. They have two sons together. In 2015 she married actor Lauri Tilkanen with whom she has a son born in 2014. They got divorced in June of 2020

Tola is close friends with actress Pihla Viitala.

== Filmography ==
=== As actress ===
| Year | Title | Role | Notes |
|---|---|---|---|
| 2003 | Helmiä ja sikoja | Department Store Clerk | |
| 2004 | Skene | Ella | Television film |
| 2005 | Kumman kaa | Mimmi | Episode: "Puhtaalta pöydältä" |
| 2005 | Frozen Land | Elina Oravisto | Finnish: Paha maa |
| 2005 | Caasha | Petsy | Television film |
| 2005 | Beauty and the Bastard | Nelli | Also as performer: "Pidä Musta Kii" ja "Tee Se Niin" Finnish: Tyttö sinä olet tähti |
| 2006 | Akkaa päälle | N/A | Episode: "Vähän jeesiä" |
| 2006 | Saippuaprinssi | Ilona Varis | |
| 2007– 2008 | Kotikatu | Ronja Rouhiainen | 21 episodes |
| 2008 | Beverly Hills Chihuahua | Chloe | Voice role in the Finnish localization |
| 2010 | Lapland Odyssey | Inari Juntura | Finnish: Napapiirin sankarit |
| 2010 | Hiphop Hamlet | Anni Leinonen | |
| 2010 | Vastaparit | Maikku Kaarela | 3 episodes |
| 2011 | Beverly Hills Chihuahua 2 | Chloe | Voice role in the Finnish localization |
| 2011 | JuuTupen rapinat | Various roles | Television film; Also as performer: "Käärme (The Snake)" |
| 2011 | Eetu ja Konna | Zandie | Voice role |
| 2011 | Elma & Liisa | Elma | Short film |
| 2011 | Burungo | Tourist Jutta | Short film; Uncredited |
| 2010– 2011 | Virta | Mervi Silvennoinen | 3 episodes |
| 2012 | Härmä | Aino Kantola | |
| 2012 | Almost 18 | Waitress | |
| 2012 | Must Have Been Love | Kaisa | |
| 2012 | Ella ja kaverit | Virastotäti | |
| 2012– 2016 | Kimmo | Ulla | 17 episodes |
| 2013 | 21 Ways to Ruin a Marriage | Elli | Finnish: 21 tapaa pilata avioliitto |
| 2013 | Heart of a Lion | Tölli | Finnish: Leijonasydän |
| 2013 | Isänmaallinen mies | Aino | |
| 2015 | Lapland Odyssey 2 | Inari | |
| 2016 | Onnenonkija | Aino Ryynänen | |
| 2016 | Saturday Night Live | Various roles | Finnish version of Saturday Night Live; 12 episodes |
| 2016 | Kynsin hampain | Anita Karvonen | 10 episodes |
| 2017 | Napapiirin sankarit 3 | Inari Juntura | |
| 2017 | 95 | Tammen vaimo | |
| 2018 | Kaikki oikein | Miia | |
| 2018 | The Guardian Angel – Suojelusenkeli | Susi | |
| 2018 | Karppi | Anna Bergdahl | 12 episodes |
| 2018 | Kontio & Parmas | Katjushka Joronen | Episode: "Peltipoliisi" |
| 2018 | Olavi Virta | Nainen kotiovella | |
| 2017– 2019 | Kolmistaan | Vilma | 18 episodes |
| 2019 | Aurora | Ulla | |
| 2019 | Ricky Rapper and the Strongman | Rauha Räppääjä | |
| 2019 | Roba | Taikan äiti | Episode: "Homma hallussa" |
| 2020 | Teräsleidit | Airport Clerk | |
| 2020 | Ex-onnelliset | Henriikka | Episode: "Yötapaturma" |
| 2020 | Ex-onnelliset | Hanna | Episode: "Läjäsuku" |
| 2022 | Sijainen | Paula Malinen | TV Miniseries |
| 2022 | Punttikomedia | Vilin vaimo | |
| 2022 | Napapiirin sankarit 4 | Inari | |
| 2023 | Comeback | | |

=== As director ===
| Year | Title | Role | Notes |
|---|---|---|---|
| 2011 | Elma & Liisa | Director, writer | Short film |
| 2011 | Burungo | Director, writer | Short film |
| 2018 | Swingers | Director | |
| 2020 | Ladies of Steel | Director, writer | |
| 2021 | Mädät omenat | Director | 4 episodes |
| 2023 | The Worst Idea Ever | Director | |
| 2025 | Ladies of Steel: Like There's No Tomorrow | Director, writer | |
