= Underworld Trilogy =

Finnish television series

Underworld Trilogy is a Finnish drama/thriller television series produced by Vertigo Production in 2010. The Underworld Trilogy consists of three miniseries: The Prisoner, The Cop and The Lawyer.

The Underworld Trilogy is an uncompromising glimpse into transnational organized crime through the lives of three people - a prisoner, a cop and a lawyer - who find themselves caught up in circumstances beyond their control.

Set in Stockholm, St. Petersburg and Helsinki, these three independent, yet interconnected mini-series offer a thought-provoking observation into the links between the penal system, drug-trafficking and money laundering.

Underworld Trilogy was released 11 October 2010 in Finland on YLE1.

== The Prisoner (5 x 50 min.) ==
Computer whizz-kid VESA LEVOLA is a decent young man with a promising career who unexpectedly ends up in prison after becoming involved in a street fight. Suddenly he is faced with a situation in which the key to survival lies in making contacts in the criminal underworld. Vesa ends up working for the kingpin of the criminal world, REIJO SUNDSTRÖM, who runs a drug-trafficking organization from behind bars. Prison proving no obstacle for his criminal actions, Sundström secures heroin shipments (codenamed Cuba Libre) from St. Petersburg to Sweden through Finland. Vesa soon realizes he is just a pawn in a game of chess between Sundström and inspector JUHA VIITASALO, who is willing to exceed his powers as a police officer in order to stop Sundström's racket.

The Prisoner (Finnish series) was directed by Minna Virtanen and written by Marko Leino. The series’ cast includes actors from Finland, Sweden, Russia and Estonia, such as Mikko Kouki, Martti Suosalo, Max Ovaska and Ville Haapasalo.

The Prisoner is based on the book ANSA (2009) by Marko Leino who has written the script for the Prisoner before the book. Ansa was elected the best crime novel VUODEN JOHTOLANKA in Finland 2010. ANSA will be released also in Sweden and Germany.

== The Cop (3 x 50 min.) ==
A detective working with the narcotics unit of the Stockholm police, PEKKA MANNINEN is called to Finland with the task of charting the route via which heroin is smuggled from St. Petersburg to Finland and the rest of the world. The Helsinki police department's narcotics unit has already been on the case with no results, and so the rough-and-ready Manninen goes undercover into a Russian drug operation. Treading the fine line between the legal and the illegal, Manninen begins to confuse the roles of police officer and criminal, until he goes too far and there's no turning back.

The Cop (Finnish series) was directed by Minna Virtanen and written by Pekka Lehtosaari. The series’ cast includes actors from Finland, Sweden and Russia, such as Antti Reini, Tatiana Susi, Dan Bejarano and Vyacheslav Razbegaev.

== The Lawyer (3 x 50 min.) ==
TOMAS MATTILA is a scruffy, beer-guzzling attorney who has been representing criminals in court for around ten years. He was fired from his previous job as a corporate lawyer and, with the doors of the business world closed for him, he was forced to turn to defending criminals. Unfortunately, he is not particularly good at what he does, and is completely fed up with his frustrating job and his clients. Through a coincidence, however, he gains a new client, the beautiful blonde NINA, who offers him a lucrative job. Without questioning this tempting deal in any way, Mattila believes his luck has turned. He sobers up and begins to enjoy his newfound success, until he finds out that he is helping Swedish white-collar criminals launder money. Mattila realizes too late that there is no way out.

The Lawyer (Finnish series) was directed by Petri Kotwica and written by Marko Leino. The series’ cast includes actors from Finland and Sweden, such as Teijo Eloranta, Janne Hyytiäinen, Linda Zilliacus, Shanti Roney and Georgi Staykov.
