= List of Amazing Race Suomi contestants =

This is a list of contestants who have appeared on Amazing Race Suomi, a Finnish reality competition show based on the American series, The Amazing Race. A total of 68 contestants have appeared in the series.

== Contestants ==
=== Season 1 (2023) ===
Name	Age	Finish	Source
Anna Perho	52	12th	
Atte Lehtiniittu	22	12th	
Aino-Kaisa Pekonen	44	11th	
Silvia Modig	46	11th	
Lotta Hintsa	34	10th	
Noora Hintsa	32	10th	
Katariina Kaitue	53	9th	
Benjamin Harima	29	9th	
Jukka Rasila	53	8th	
Mirva Nieminen	45	8th	
Ilmari Nurminen	32	7th	
Aapo Hettula	30	7th	
Peter Vesterbacka	55	6th	
Thy "Anna" Nguyen	18	6th	
Marcus Grönholm	55	5th	
Timo Rautiainen	58	5th	
Bakari Diarra	25	4th	
Samuel Chime	24	4th	
Janne Lehtonen	40	3rd	
Robin Hendry	37	3rd	
Tuukka Ritokoski	28	2nd	
Sami Ritokoski	58	2nd	
Kaisa Mäkäräinen	40	1st	
Mari Eder	35	1st	

=== Season 2 (2024) ===
Name	Age	Finish	Source
Aku Sipola	34	11th	
Wille Komulainen	42	11th	
Tuure Boelius	23	10th	
Saana Boelius	22	10th	
Jani Sievinen	50	9th	
Maria Nyqvist	40	9th	
Mikko Kekäläinen	47	8th	
Mervi "Meikka" Levänen	65	8th	
Tiina Reetta "Tinni" Wikström	34	7th	
Antti Savinainen	29	7th	
Deogracias "Gracias" Masomi	37	6th	
Jeremie Malolo	32	6th	
Leea Klemola	59	5th	
Kaarina Hazard	60	5th	
Paulus Arajuuri	36	4th	
Adeliina Arajuuri	32	4th	
Elias Aalto	38	3rd	
Matias Pietilä	41	3rd	
Mimosa Willamo	29	2nd	
Patrick "Pati" Willamo	55	2nd	
Metti Forssell	33	1st	
Hanna Launonen	33	1st	

=== Season 3 (2025–26) ===
Name	Age	Finish	Source
Karri "Paleface" Miettinen	47	11th	
Tuukka "Leijonamieli" Rihkola	43	11th	
Arttu Lindeman	28	10th	
Jaakko Parkkali	29	10th	
Paula Noronen	51	9th	
Kati Launiainen	49	9th	
Nina Tapio	53	8th	
Elsa Forsberg	25	8th	
Mari Hynynen	55	7th	
Joel Volanen	25	7th	
Tuomas Peltomäki	43	6th	
Sini Peltomäki	43	6th	
Armi Toivanen	44	5th	
Sari Majamaa	46	5th	
Sara Sieppi	34	4th	
Artturi Sieppi	31	4th	
Tomas Grekov	30	3rd	
Esko Rotola-Pukkila	63	3rd	
Mia "Millu" Haataja	32	2nd	
Karoliina "Karo" Tuominen	30	2nd	
Maria Guzenina	56	1st	
Vilma Vähämaa	32	1st	

=== Season 4 (2026–27) ===
Name	Age	Finish	Source
Hamza El Issaoui	26	11th	
Nasra El Issaoui	29	11th	

== Gallery ==
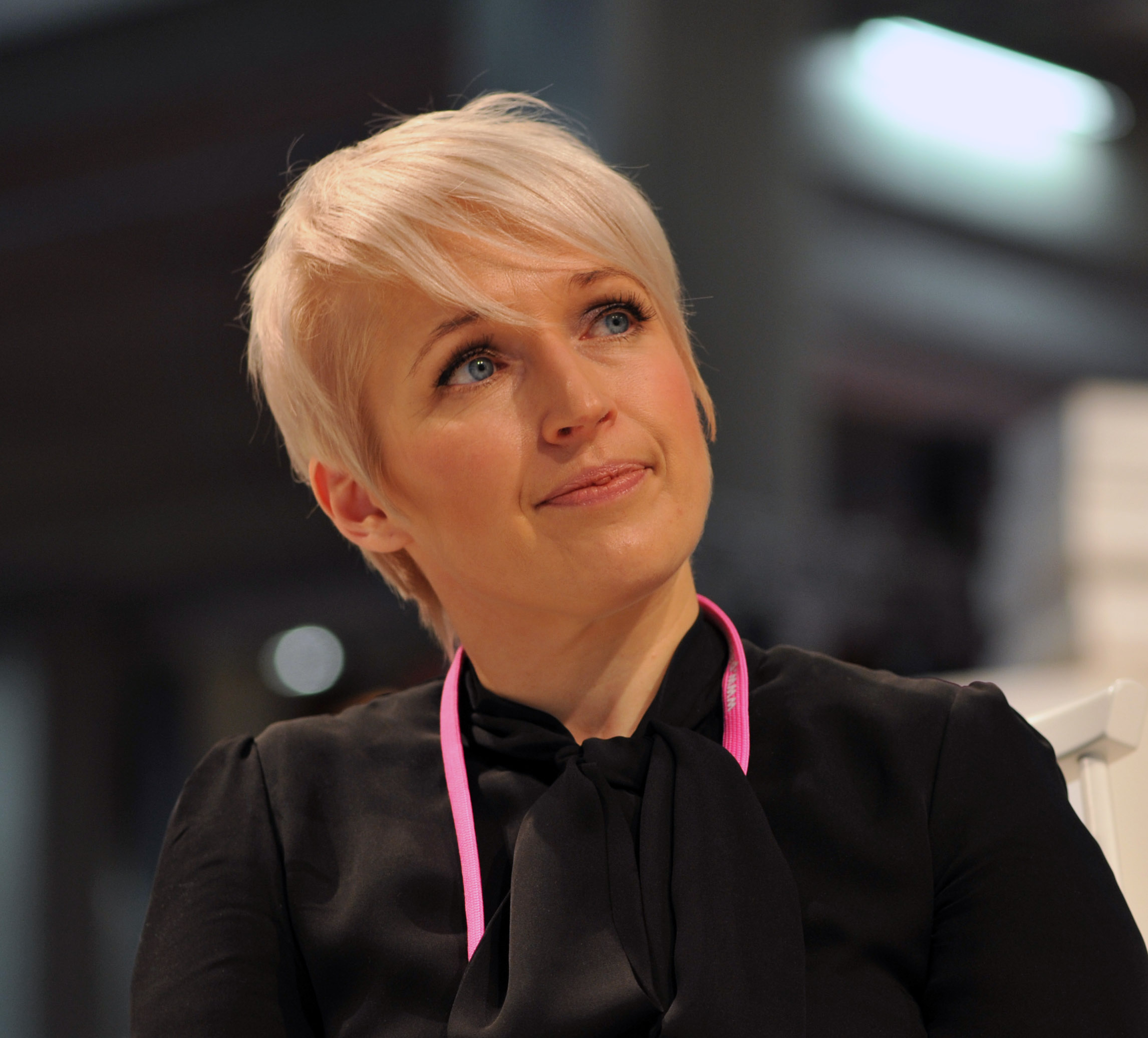
Anna Perho from the first season

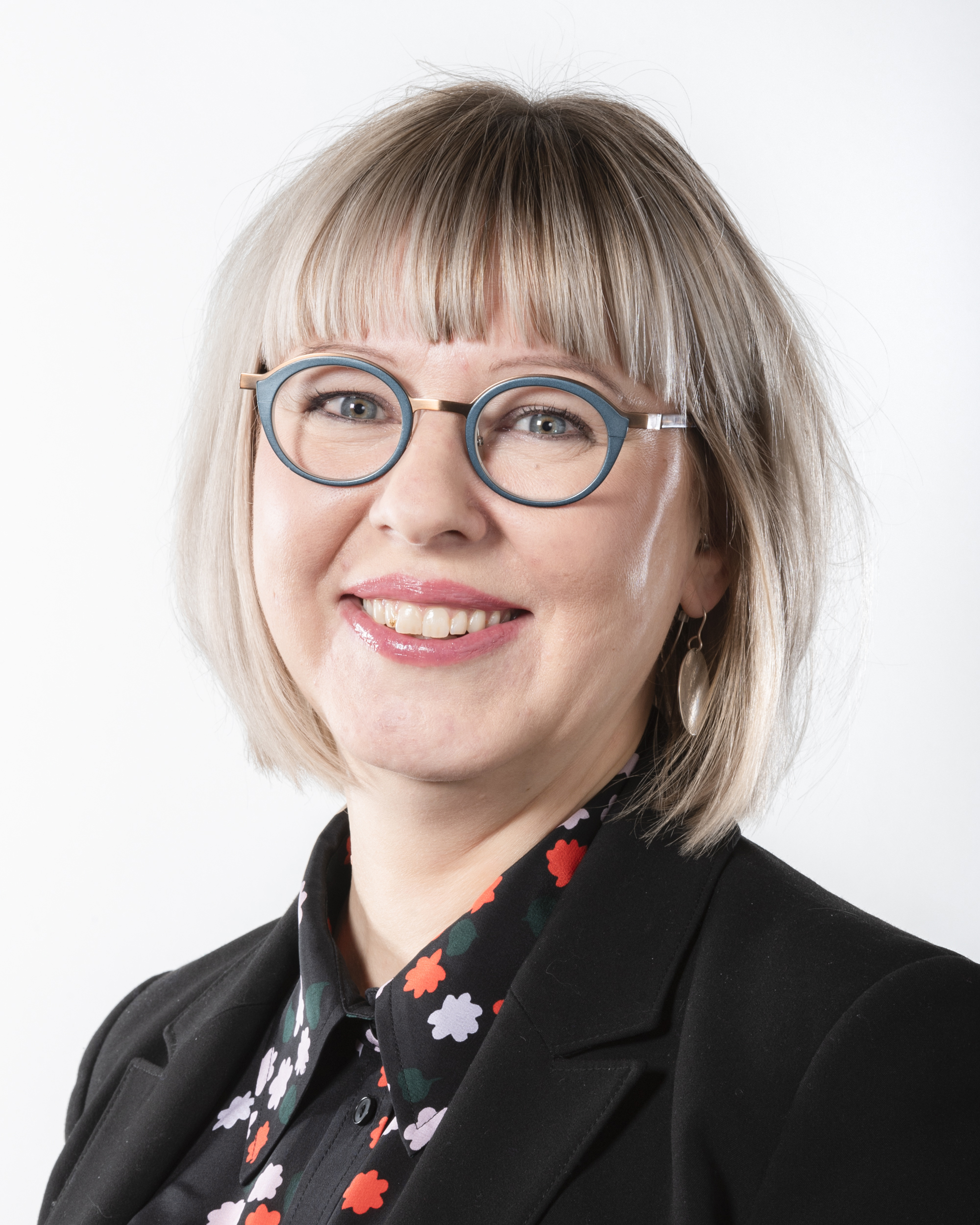
Aino-Kaisa Pekonen from the first season

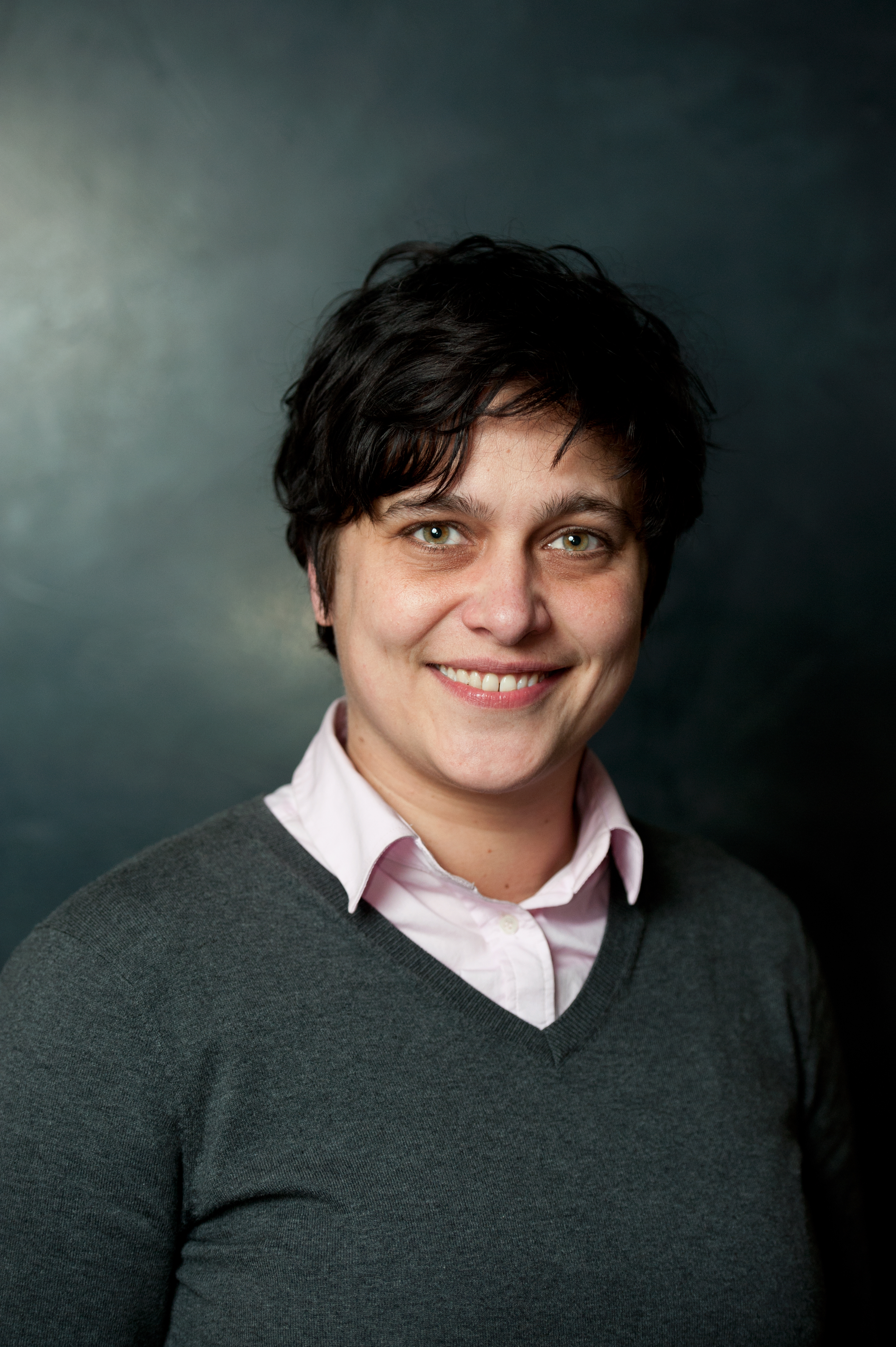
Silvia Modig from the first season

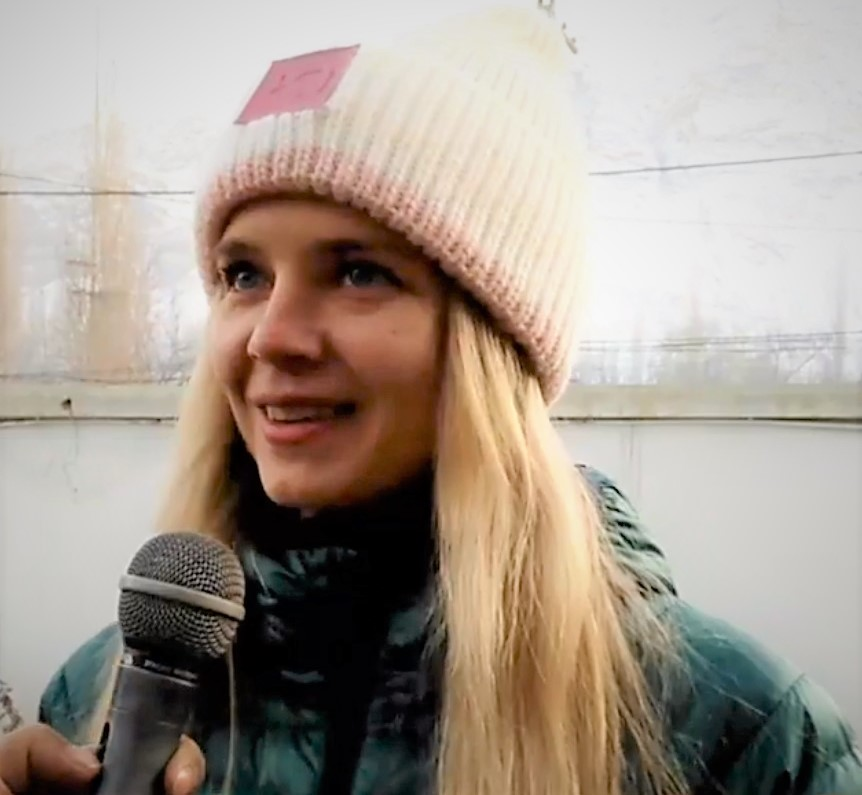
Lotta Hintsa from the first season

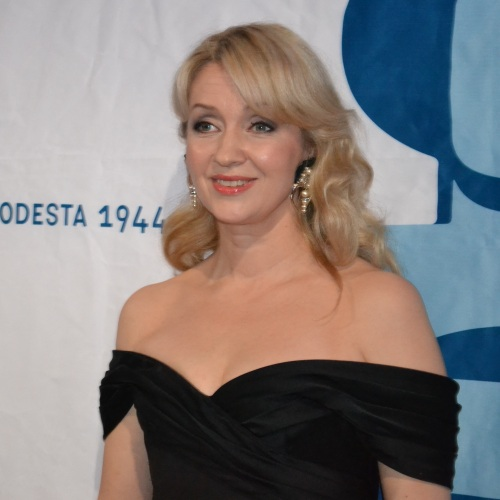
Katariina Kaitue from the first season

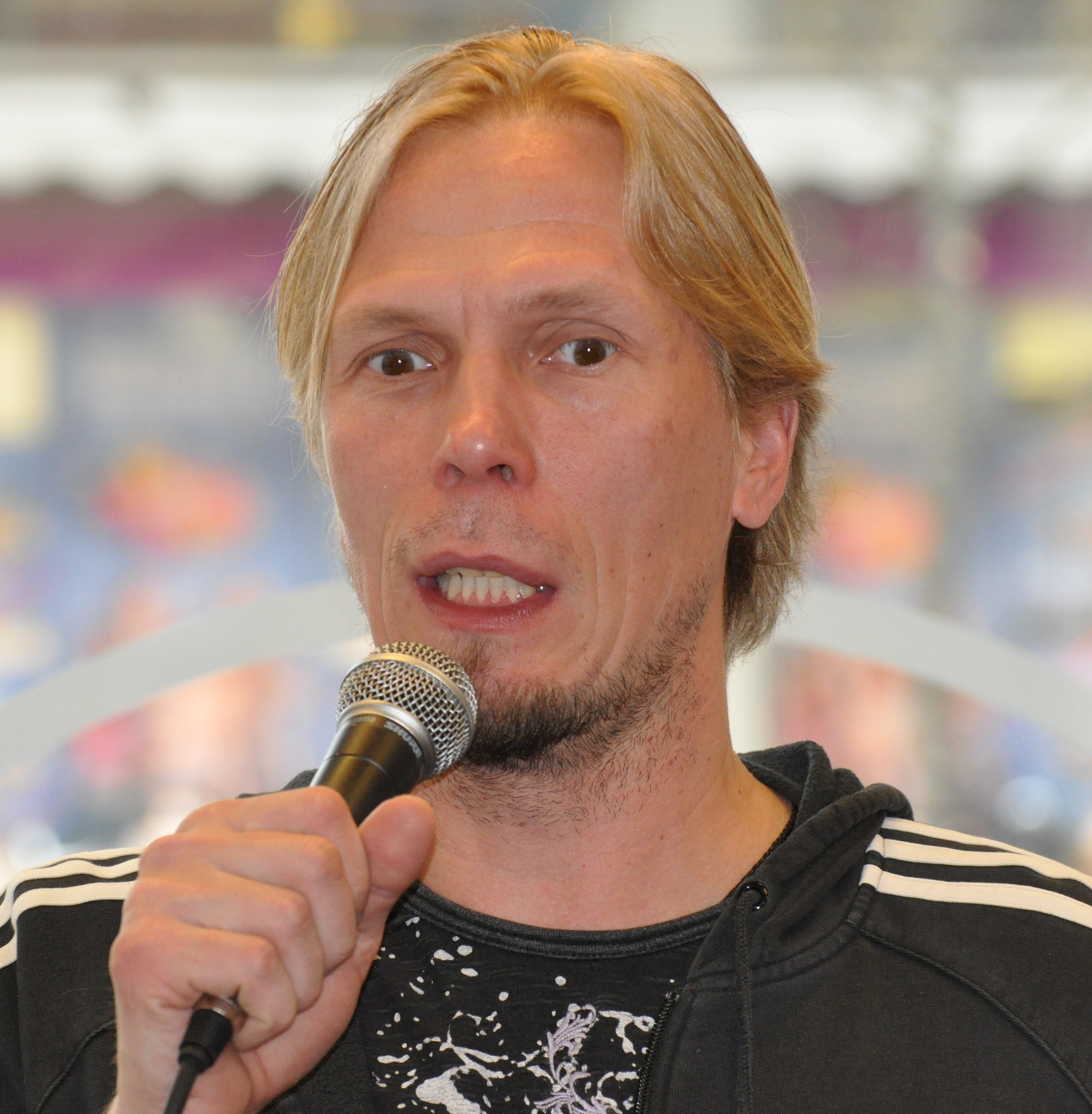
Jukka Rasila from the first season

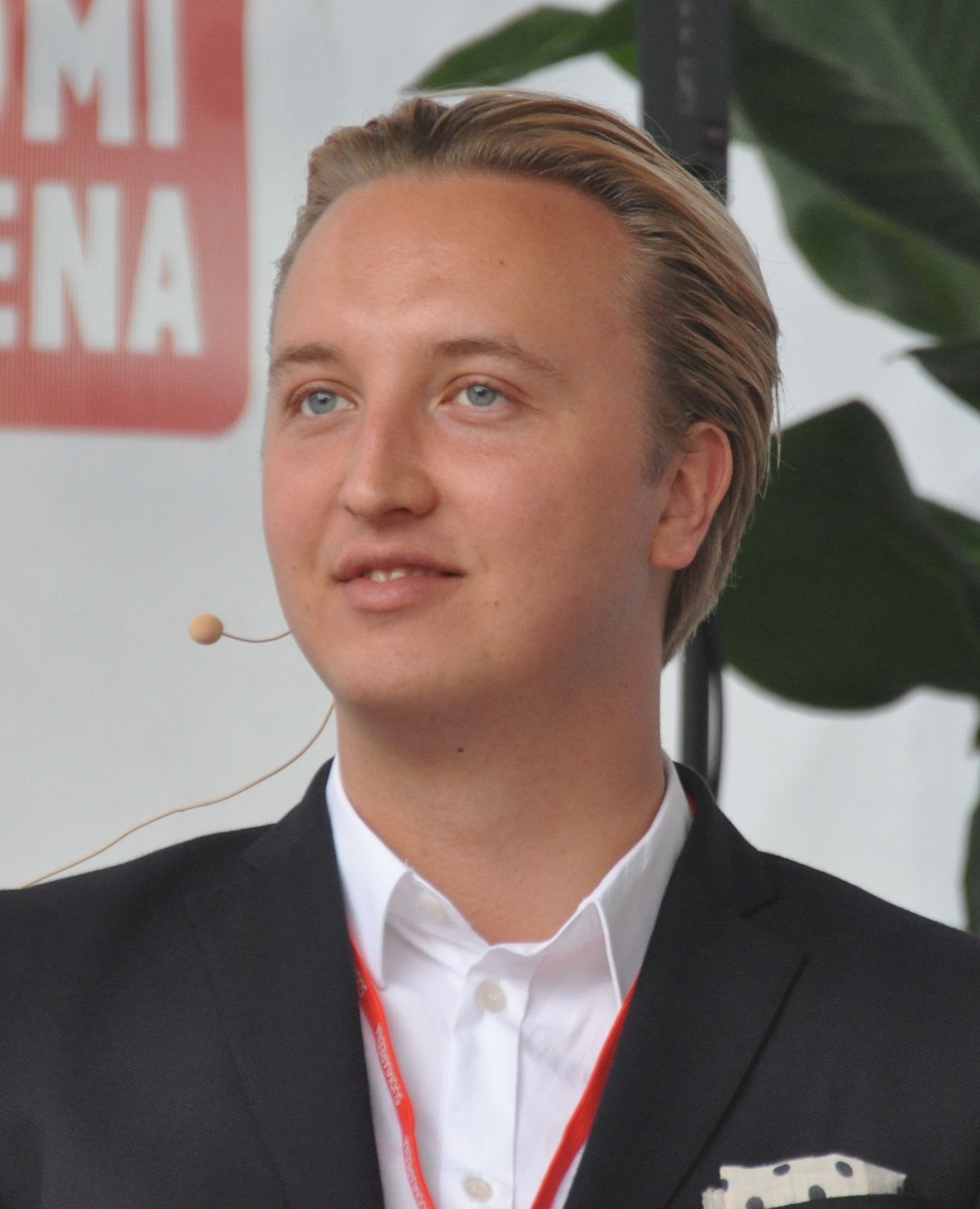
Ilmari Nurminen from the first season

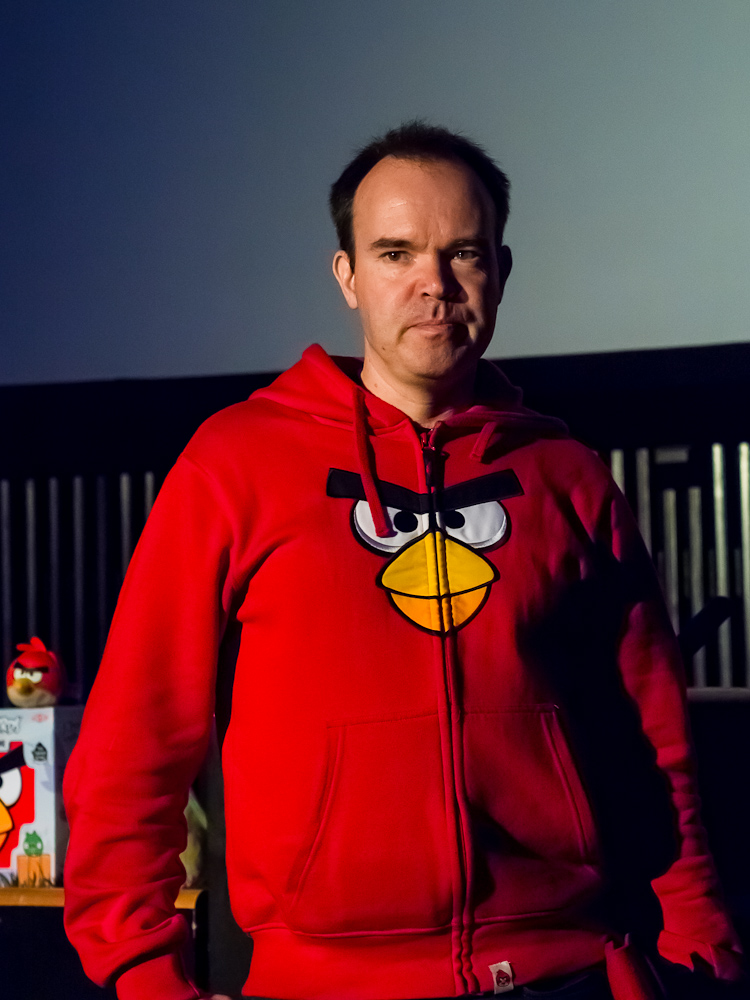
Peter Vesterbacka from the first season

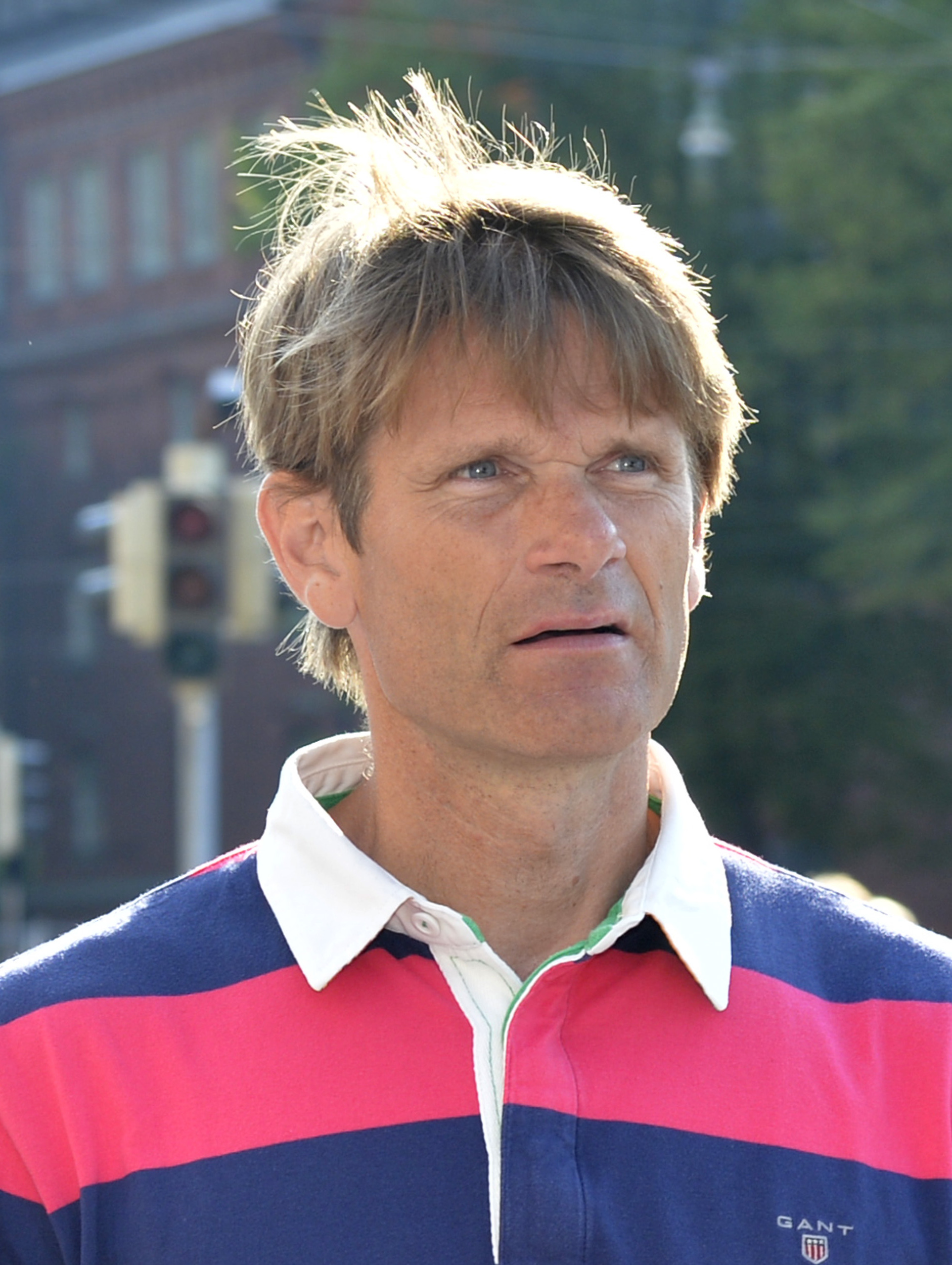
Marcus Grönholm from the first season

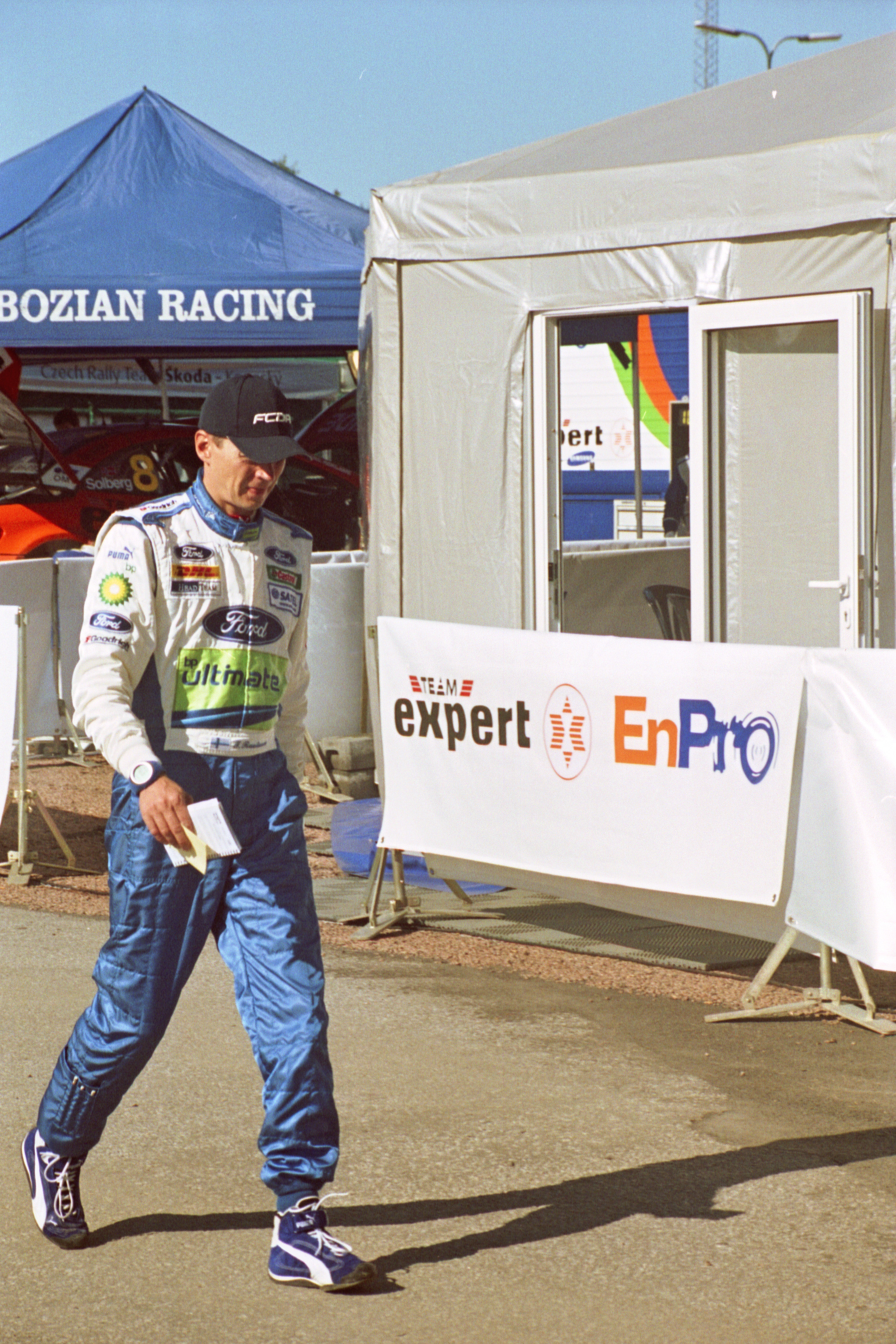
Timo Rautiainen from the first season

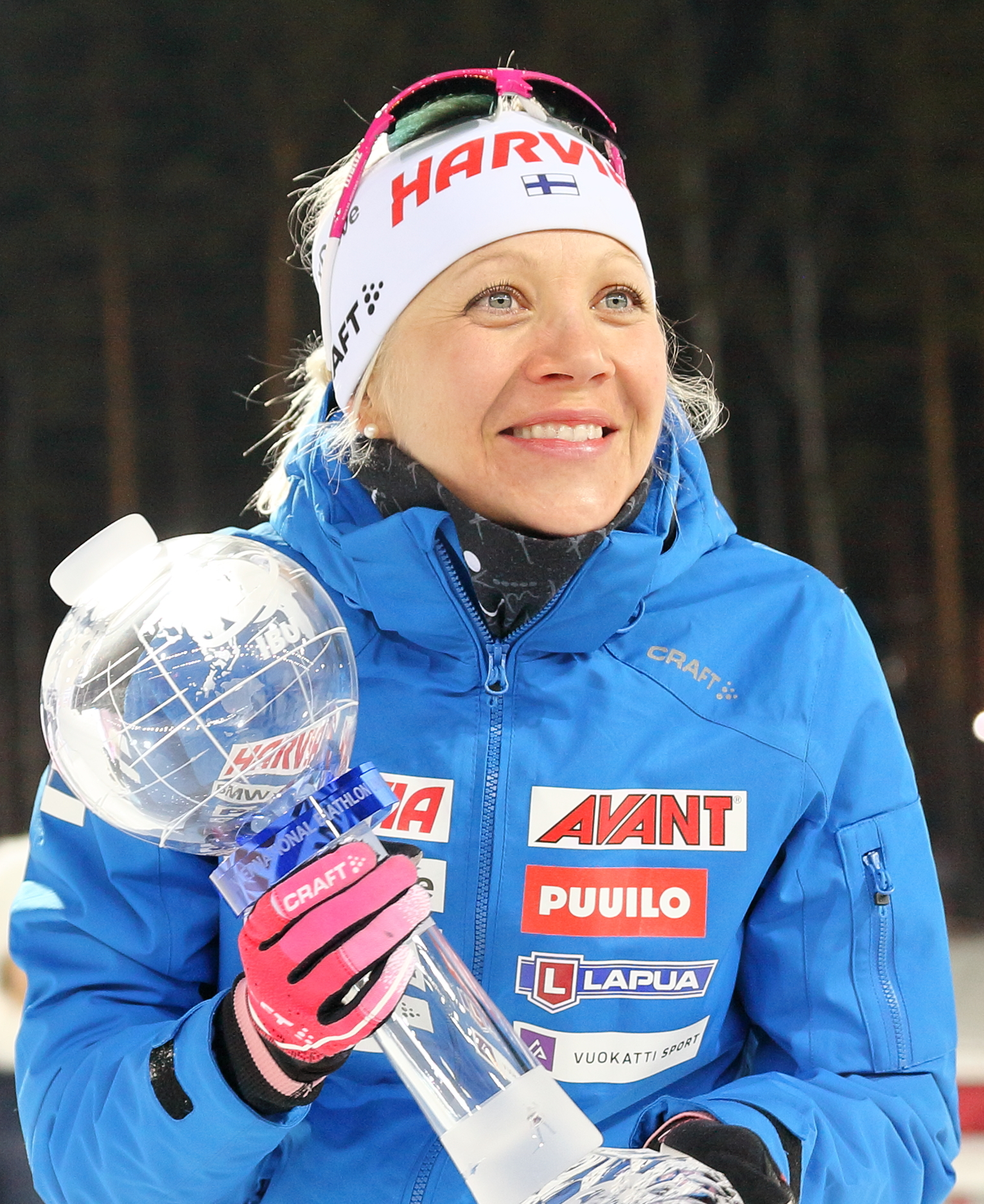
Kaisa Mäkäräinen from the first season

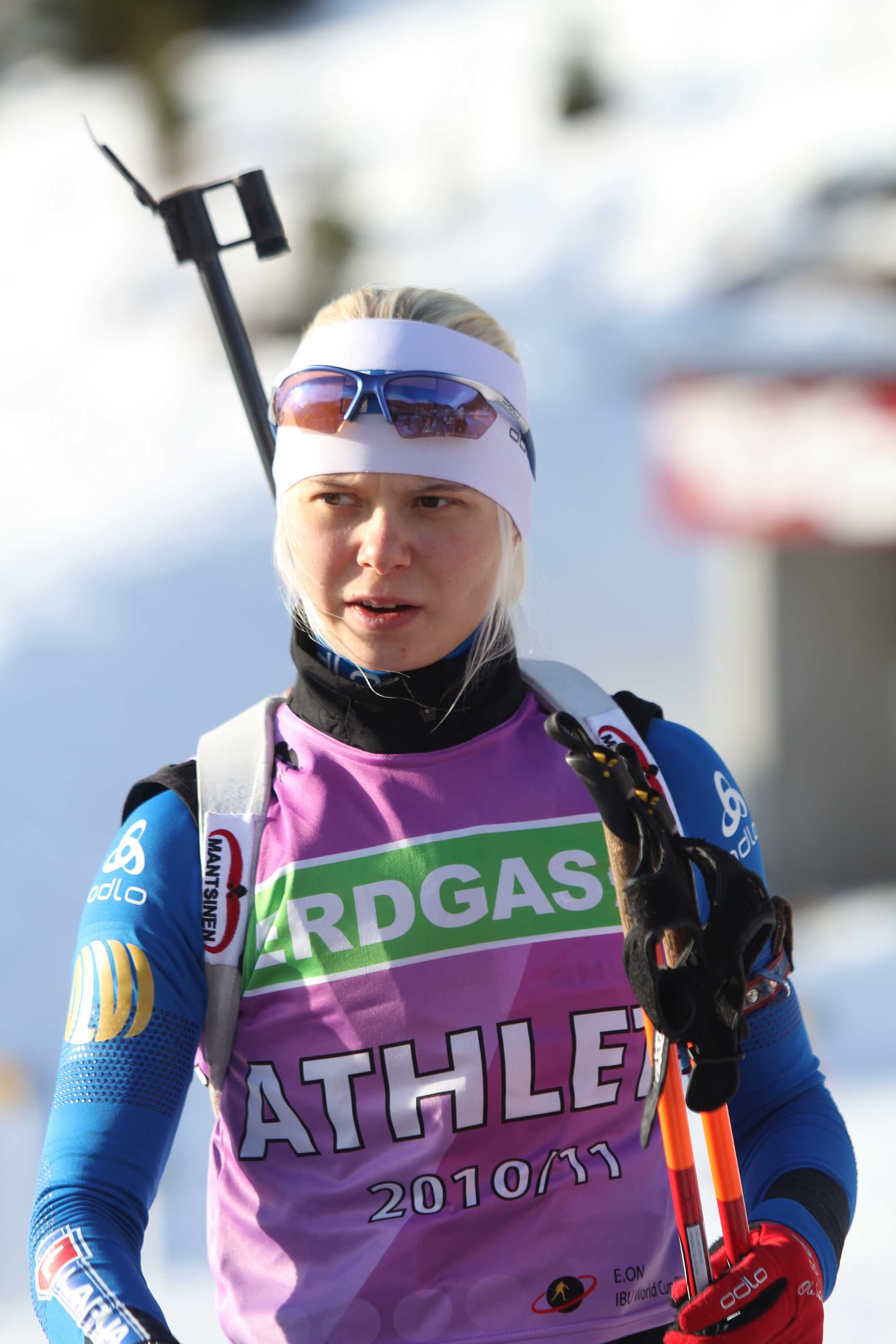
Mari Eder from the first season

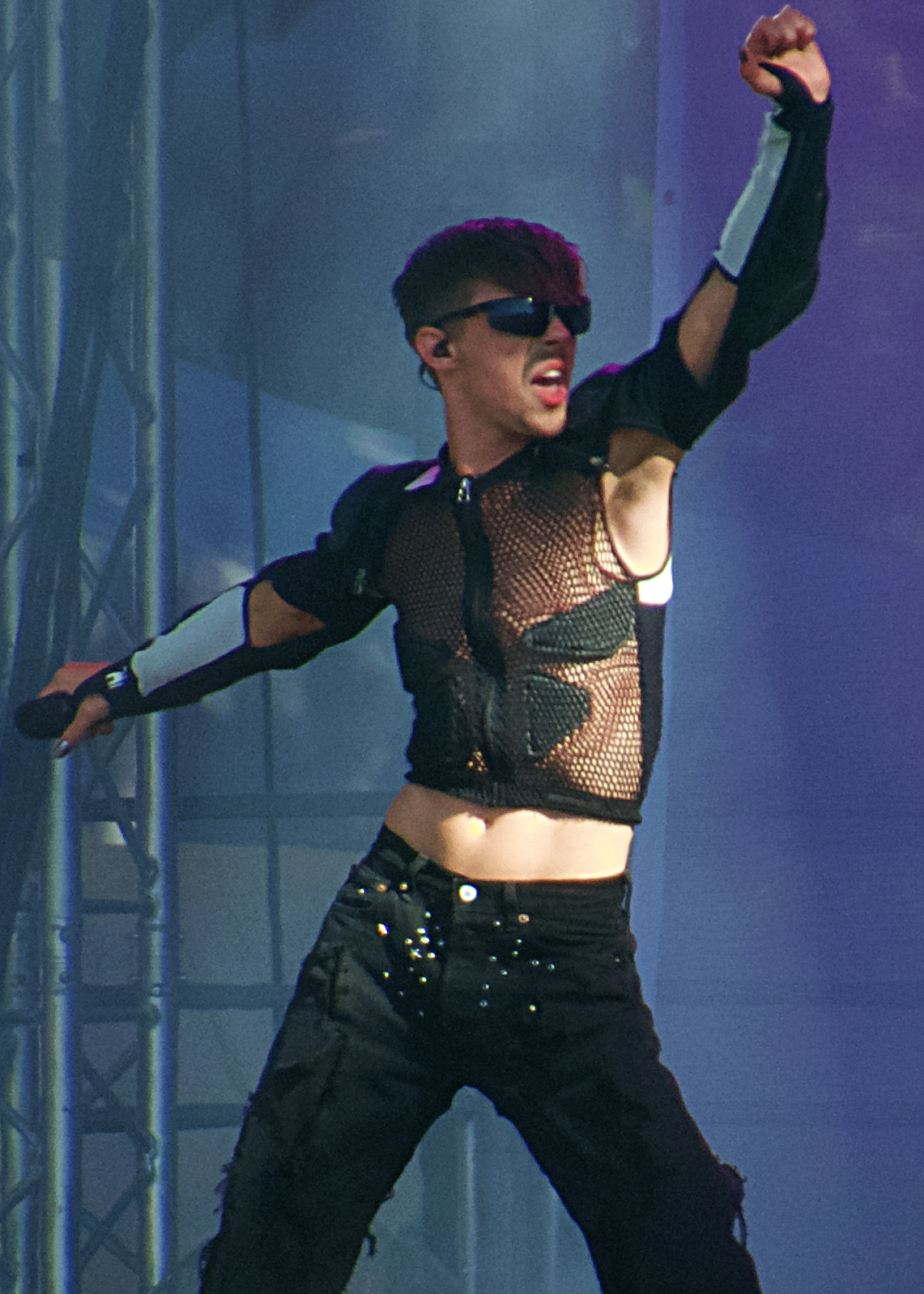
Tuure Boelius from the second season

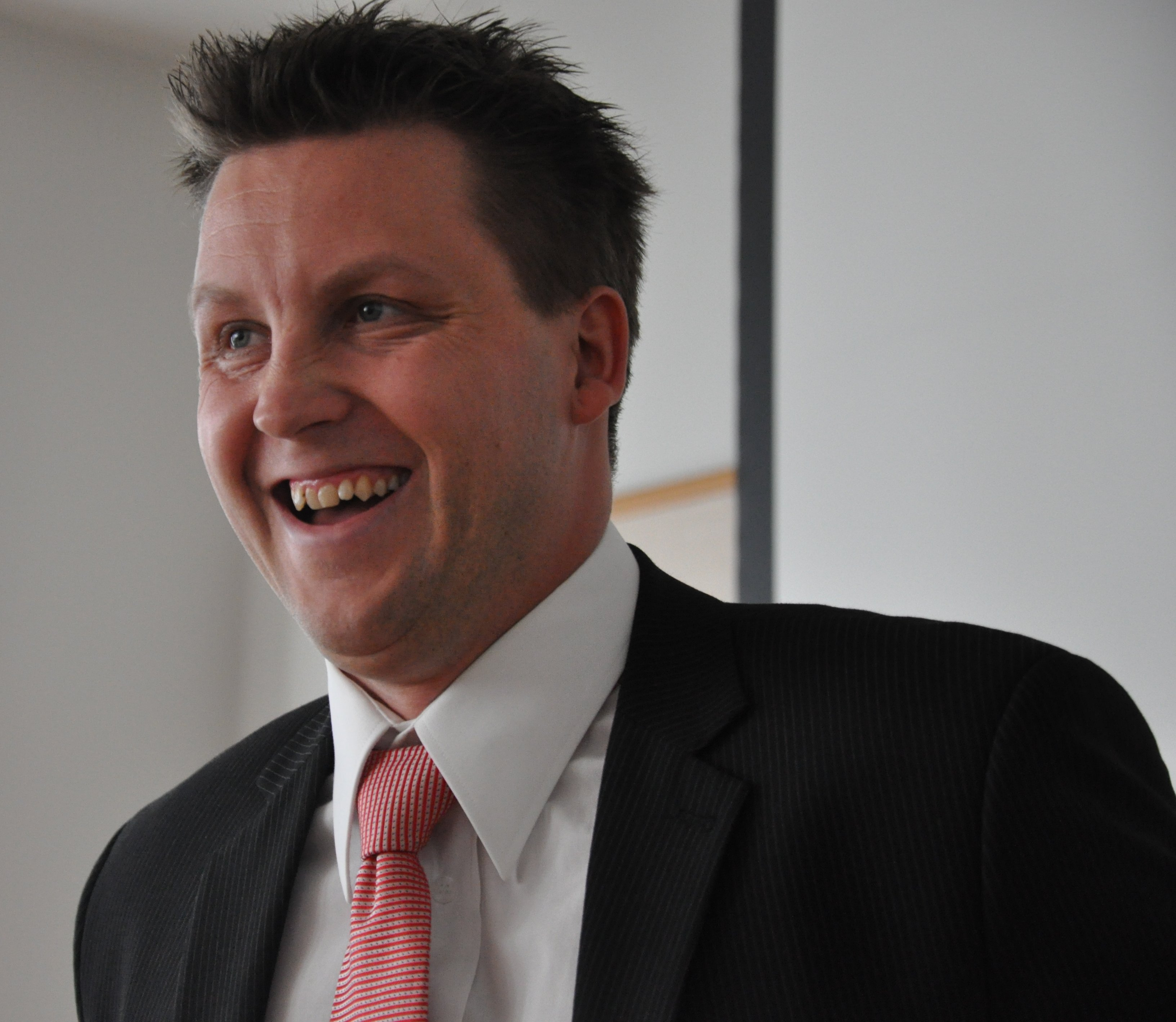
Jani Sievinen from the second season

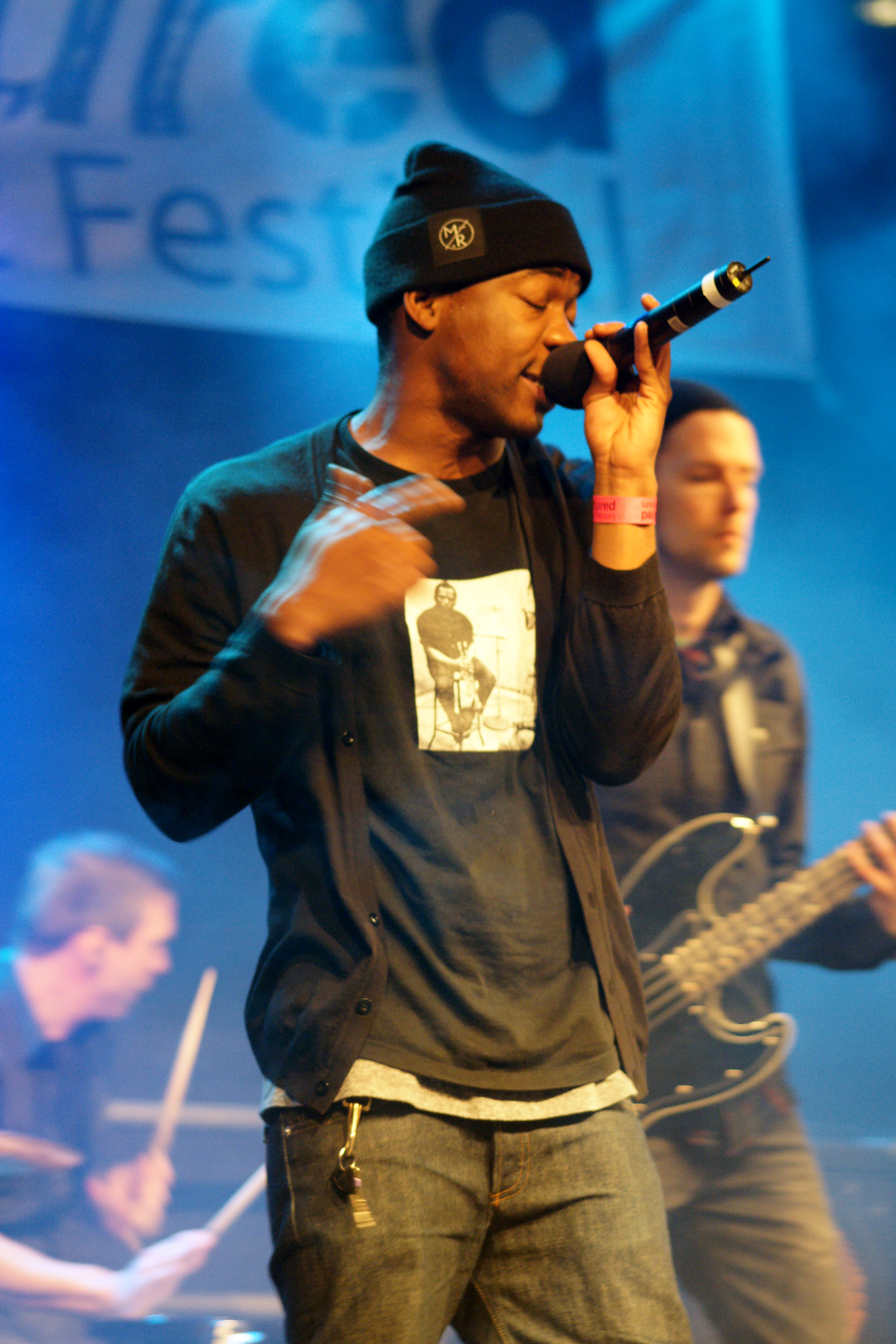
Gracias Masomi from the second season

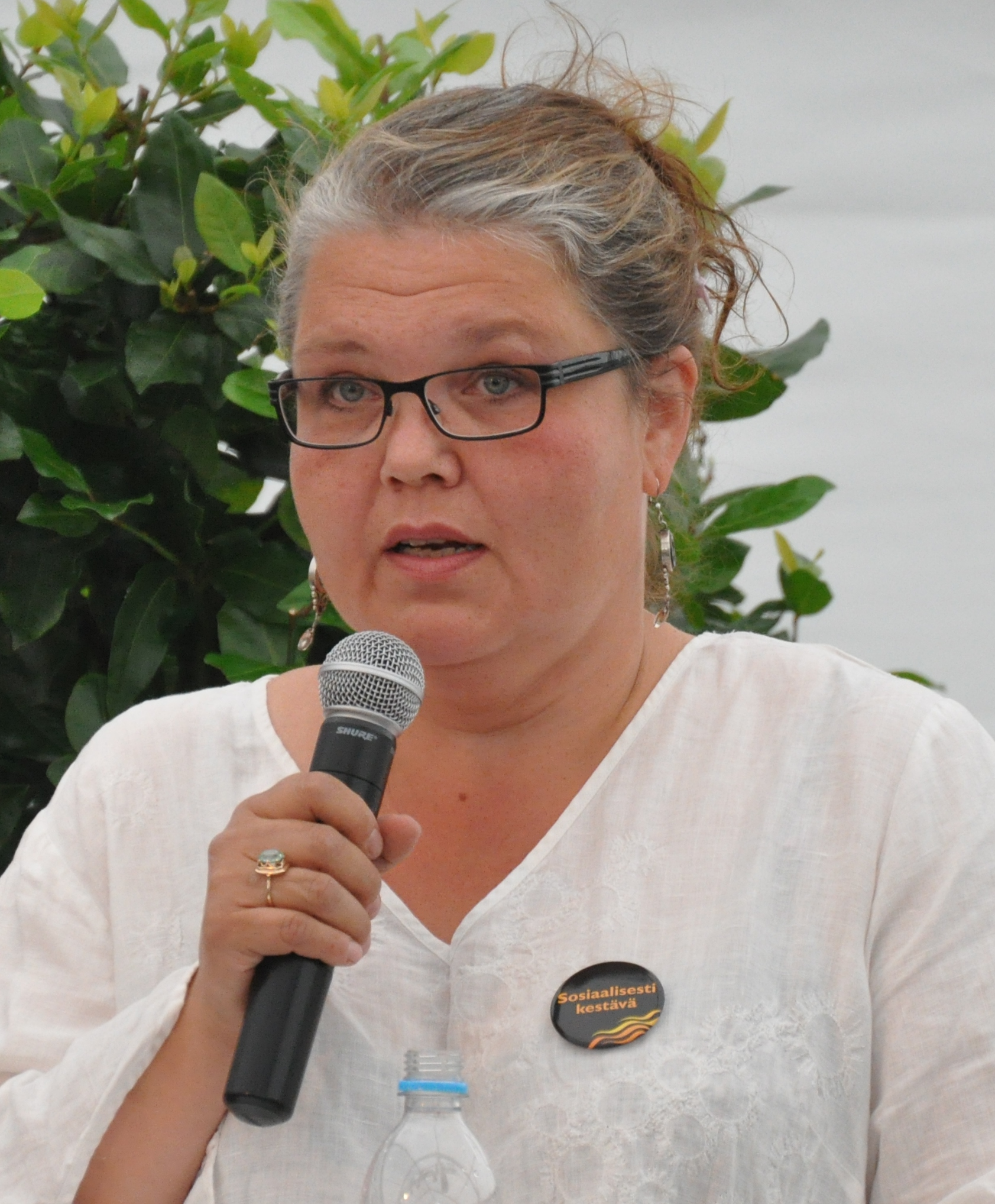
Kaarina Hazard from the second season

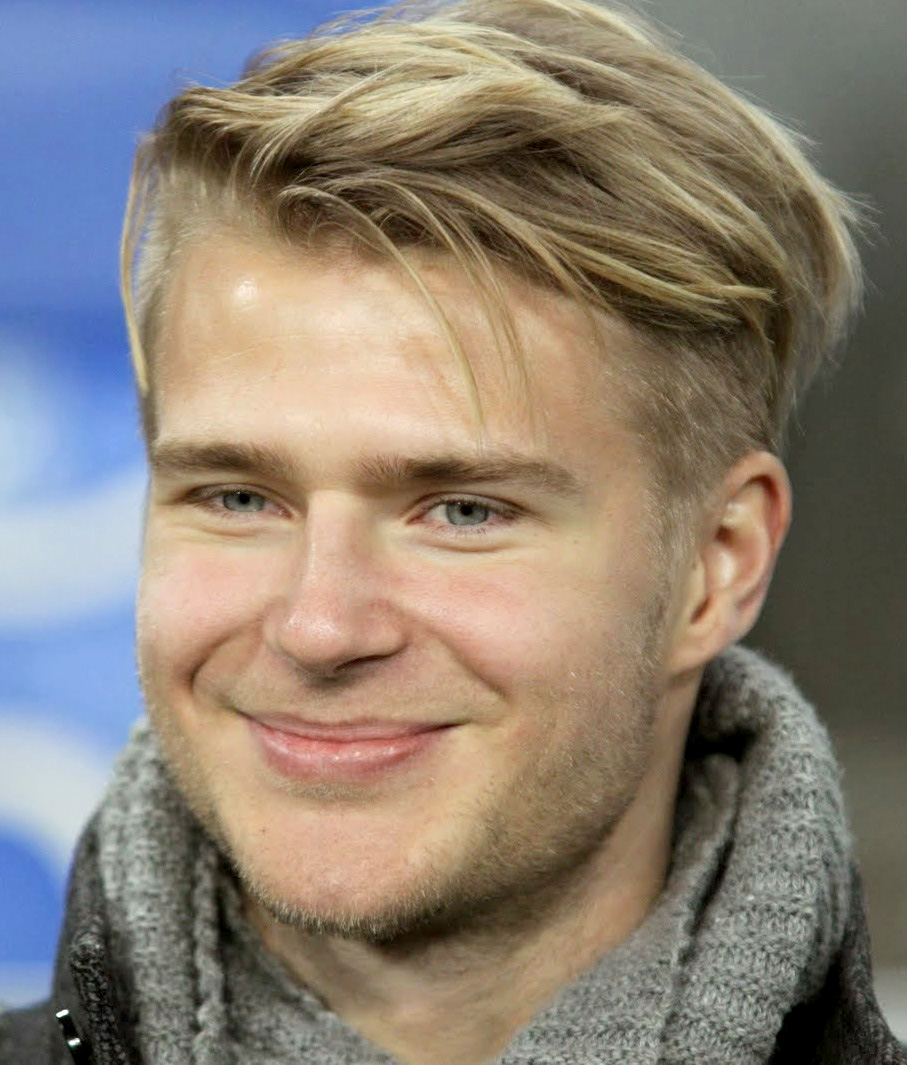
Paulus Arajuuri from the second season

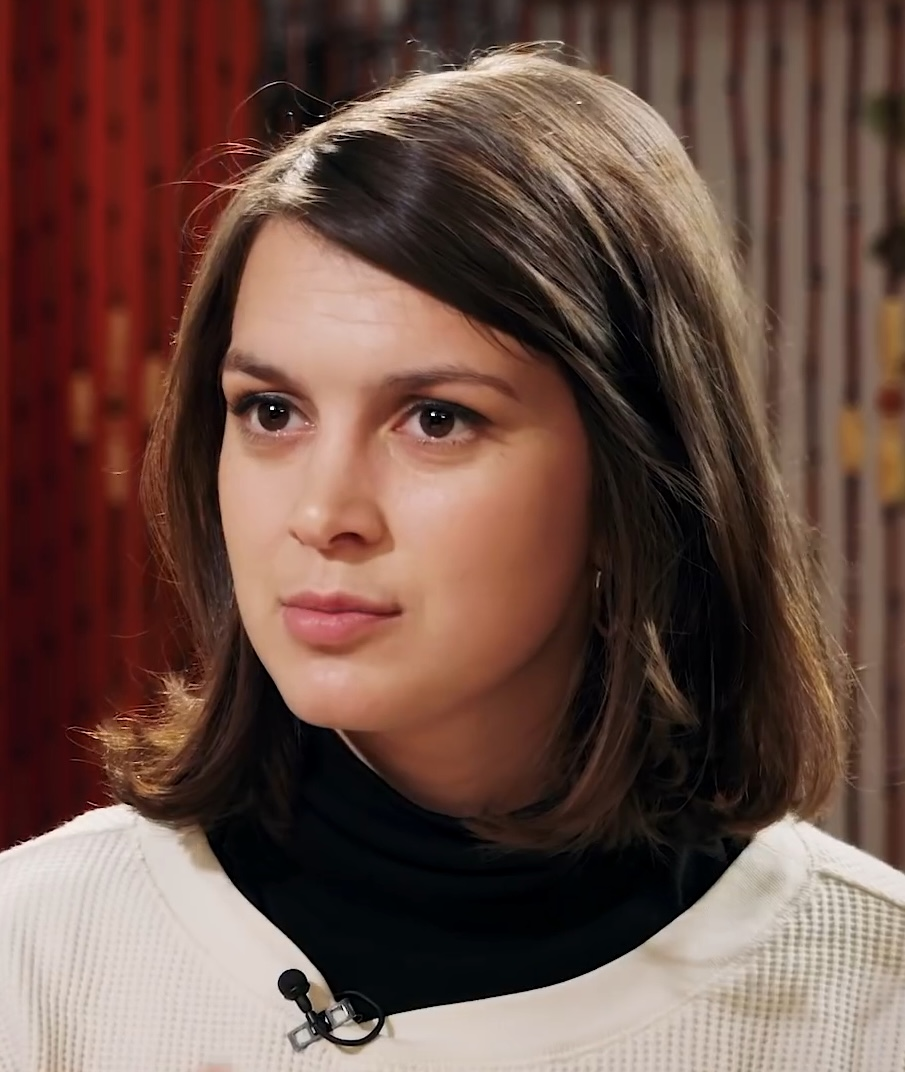
Mimosa Willamo from the second season

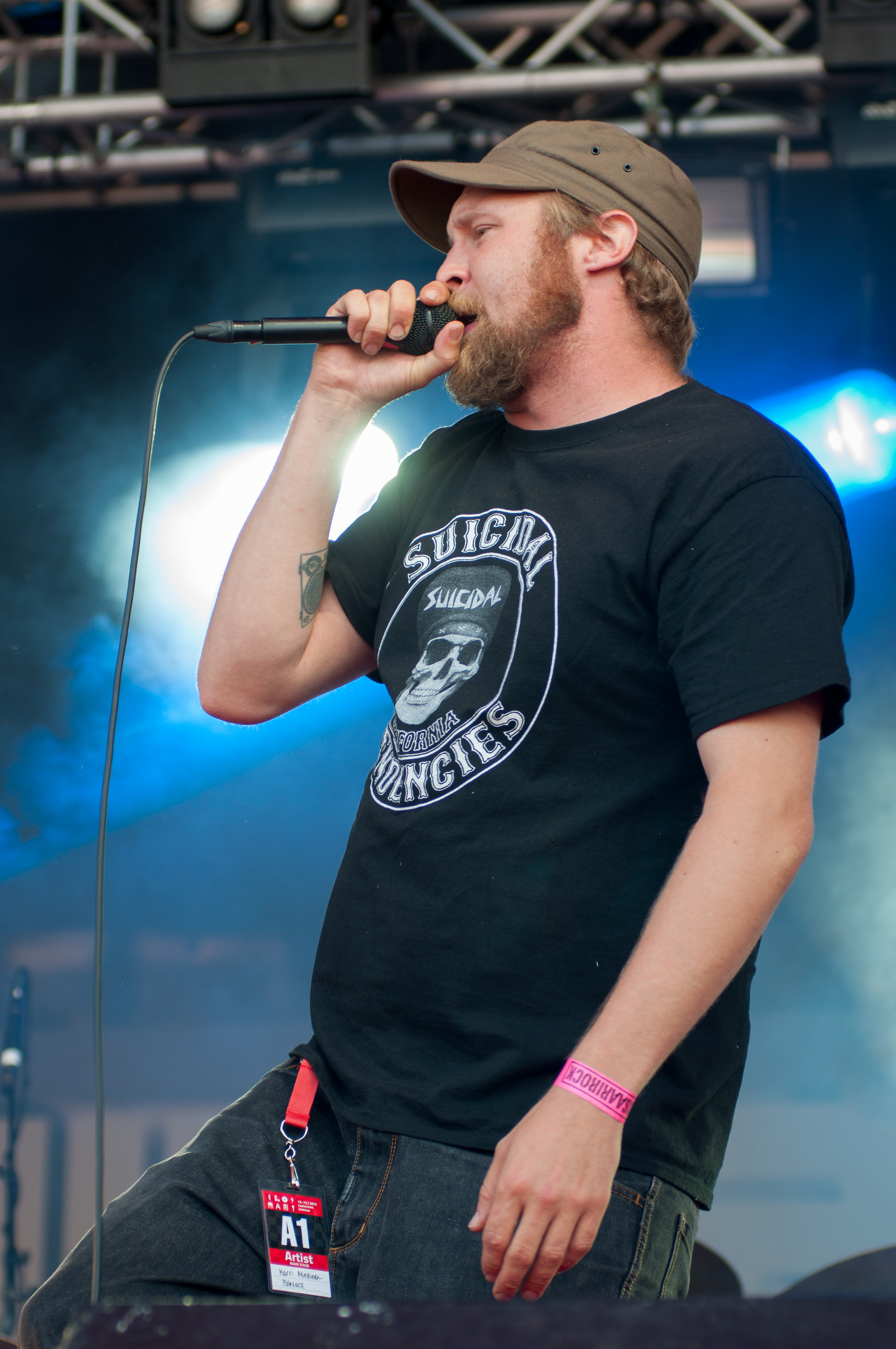
Karri "Paleface" Miettinen from the third season

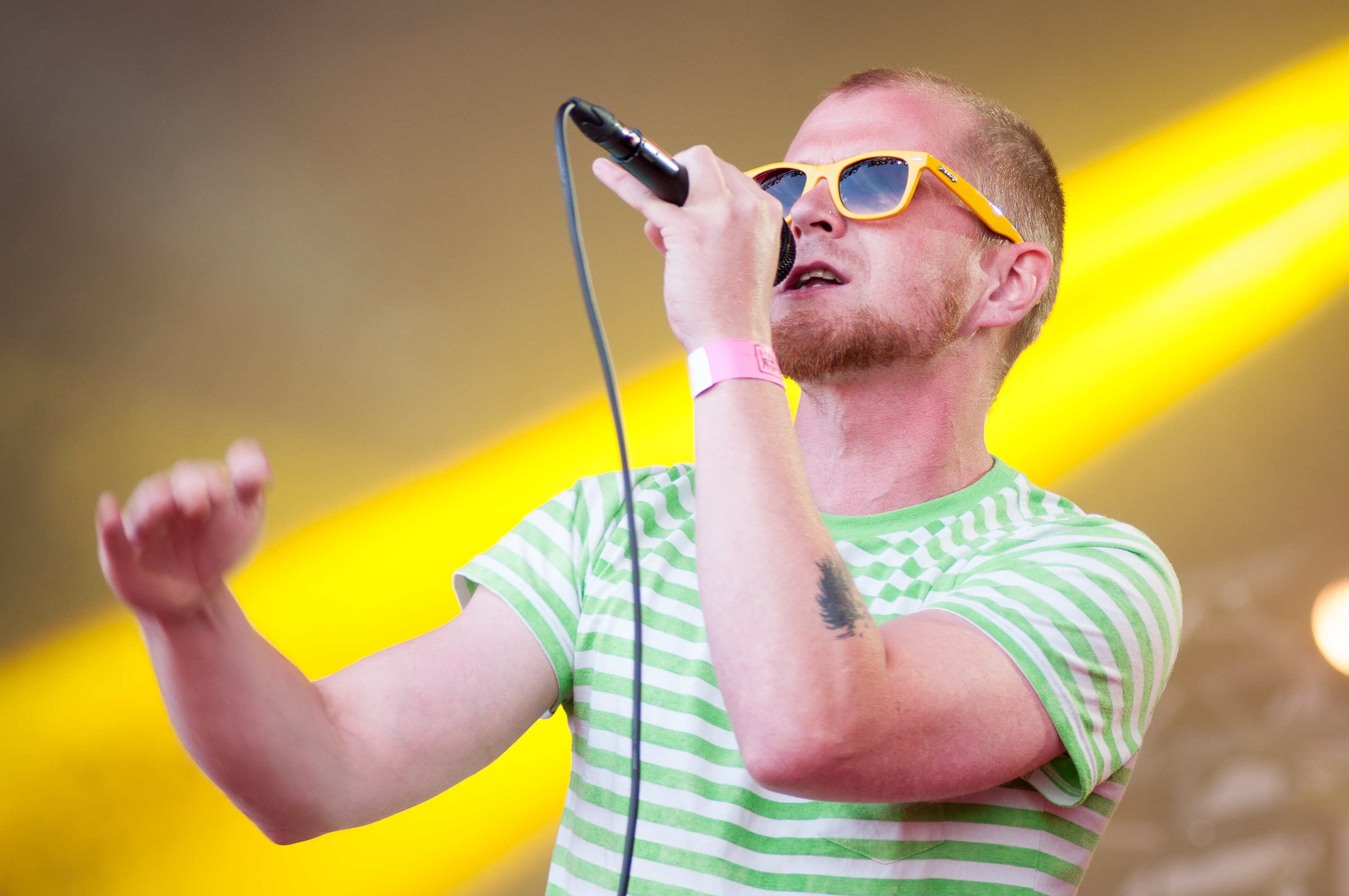
Tuukka "Leijonamieli" Rihkola from the third season

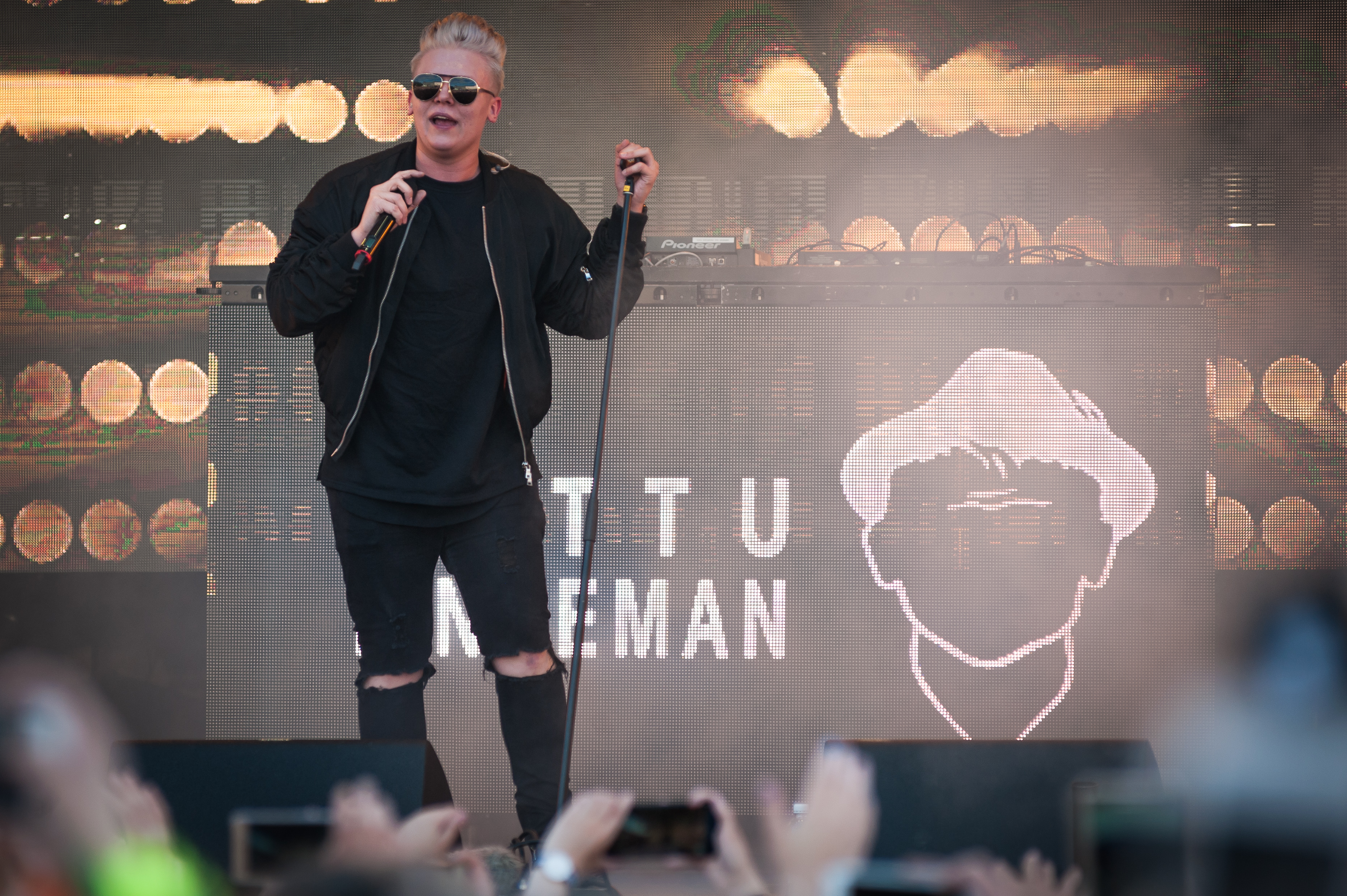
Arttu Lindeman from the third season

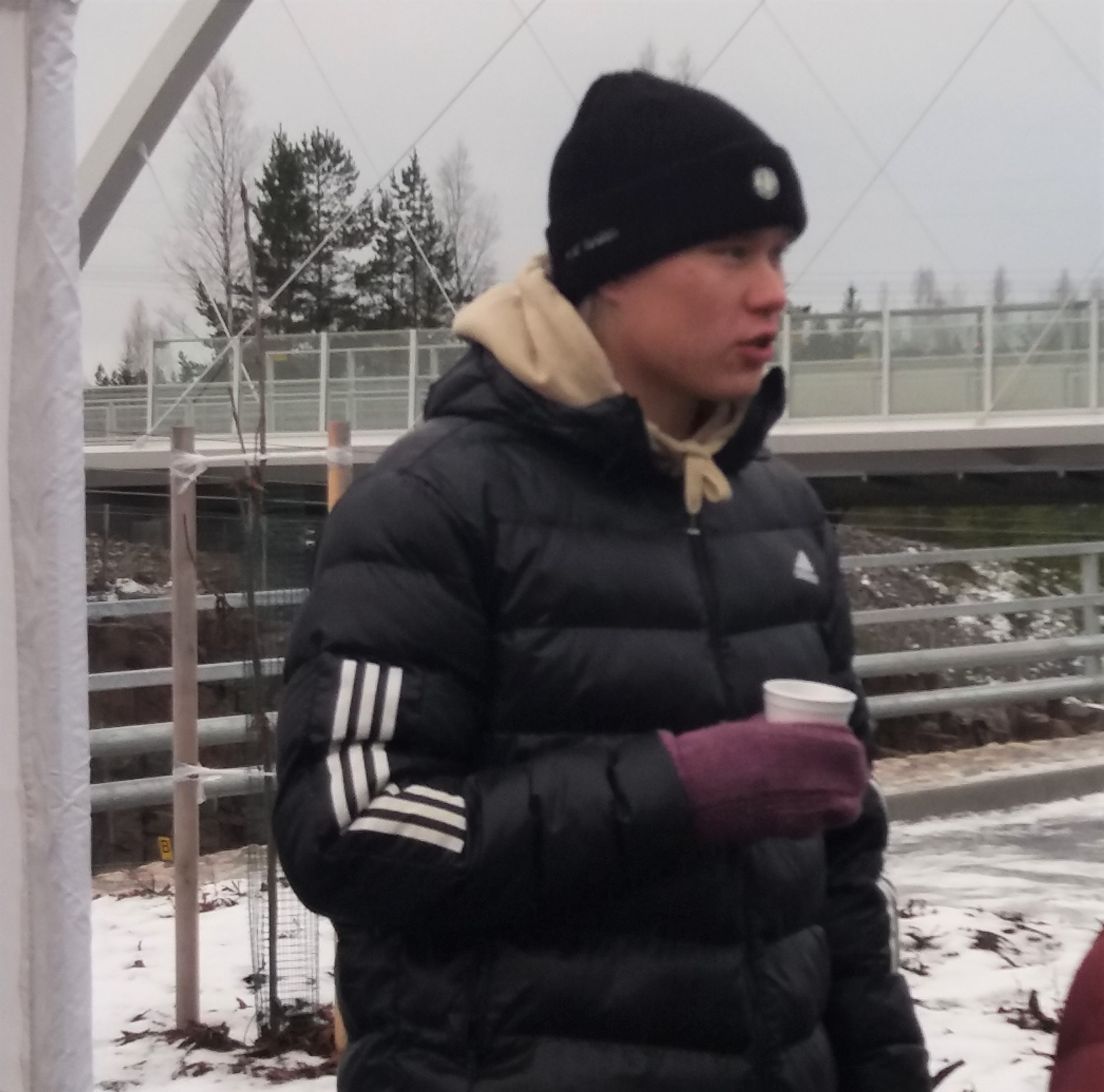
Jaakko Parkkali from the third season

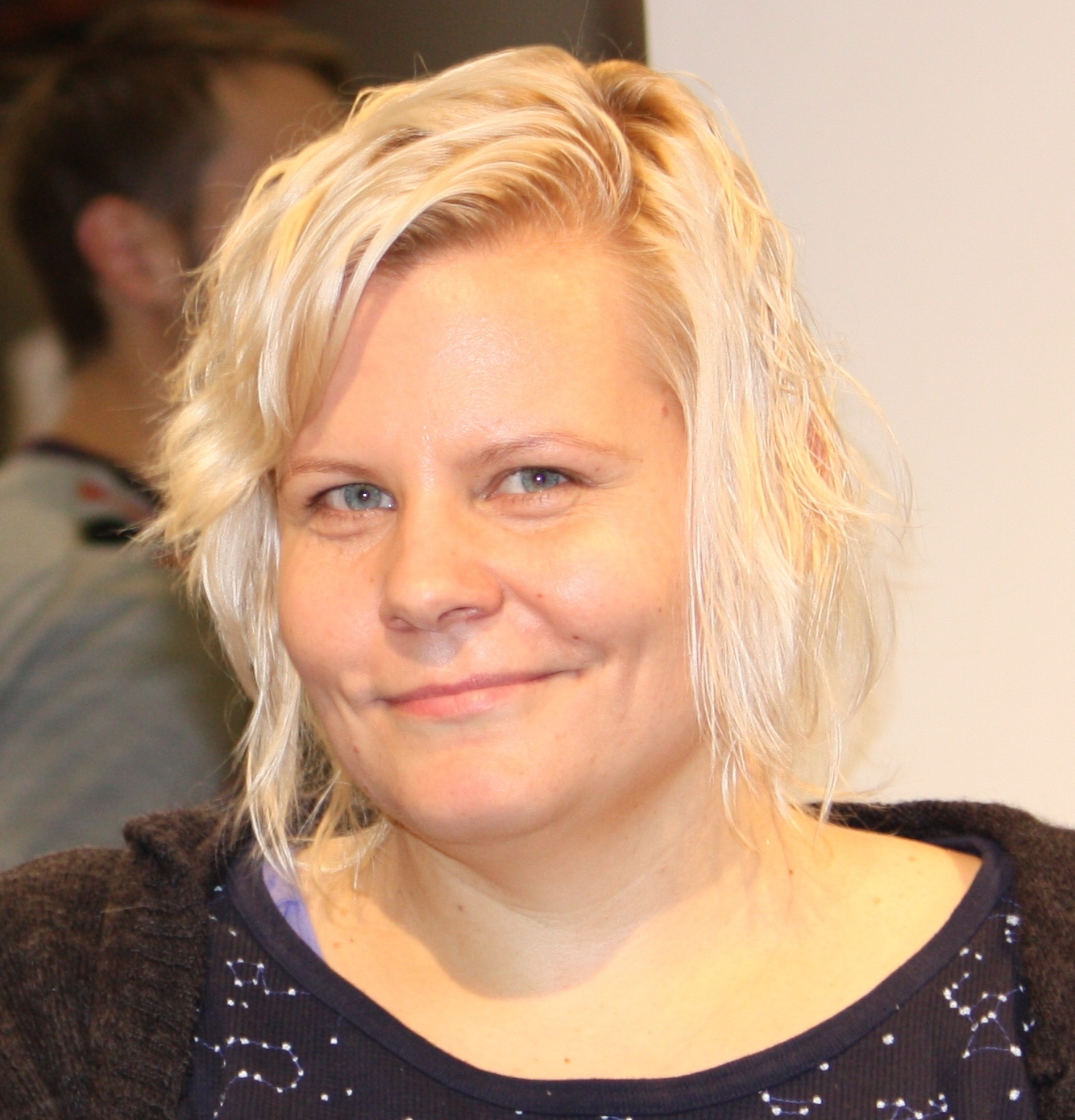
Paula Noronen from the third season

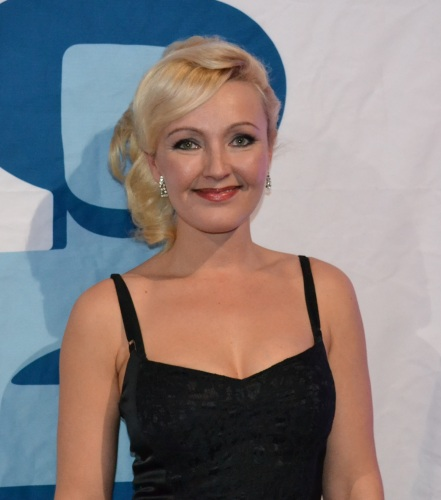
Mari Hynynen from the third season

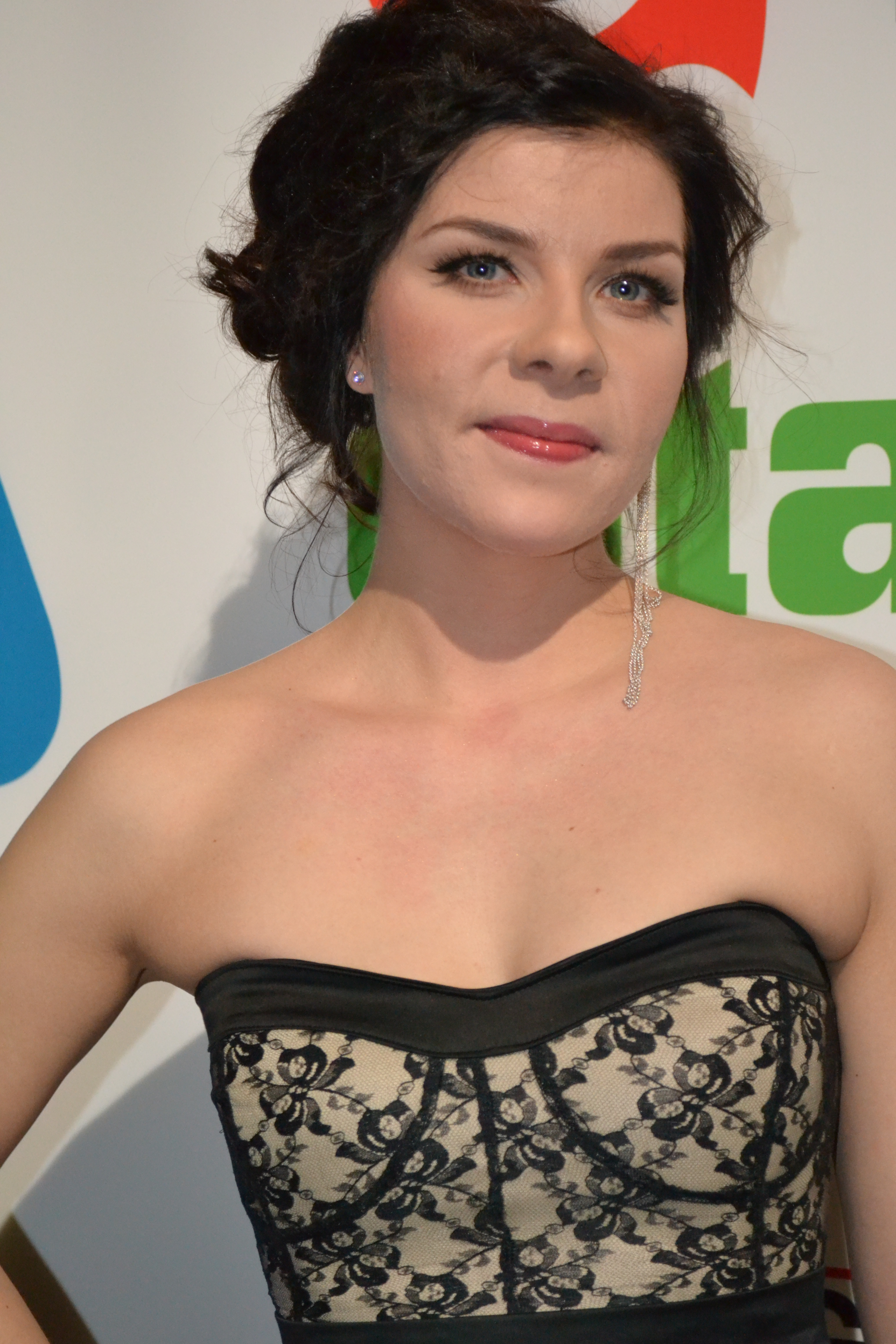
Armi Toivanen from the third season

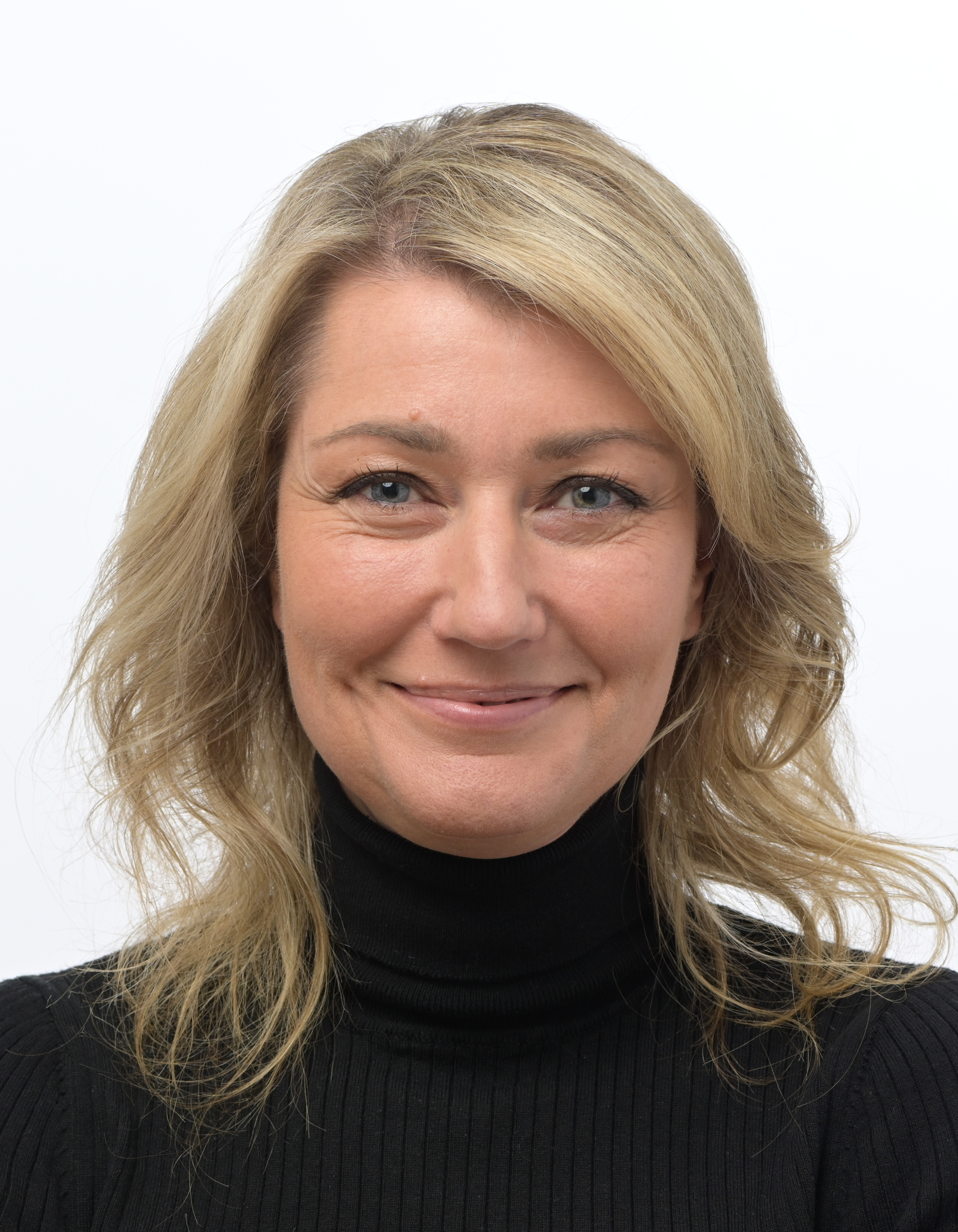
Maria Guzenina from the third season
