= Kotwica (disambiguation) =

The Kotwica ([kɔtˈfit͡sa]; Polish for "Anchor") was a World War II emblem of the Polish Underground State and Armia Krajowa (Home Army, or AK).

Kotwica may also refer to:

- Kotwica coat of arms
- Kotwica (surname)
- MKP Kotwica Kołobrzeg, a defunct Polish football club
- MKS Kotwica Kołobrzeg, a phoenix football club based on MKP
- SKK Kotwica Kołobrzeg, a Polish basketball club
