= Outi Mäenpää =

Finnish actress (born 1962)

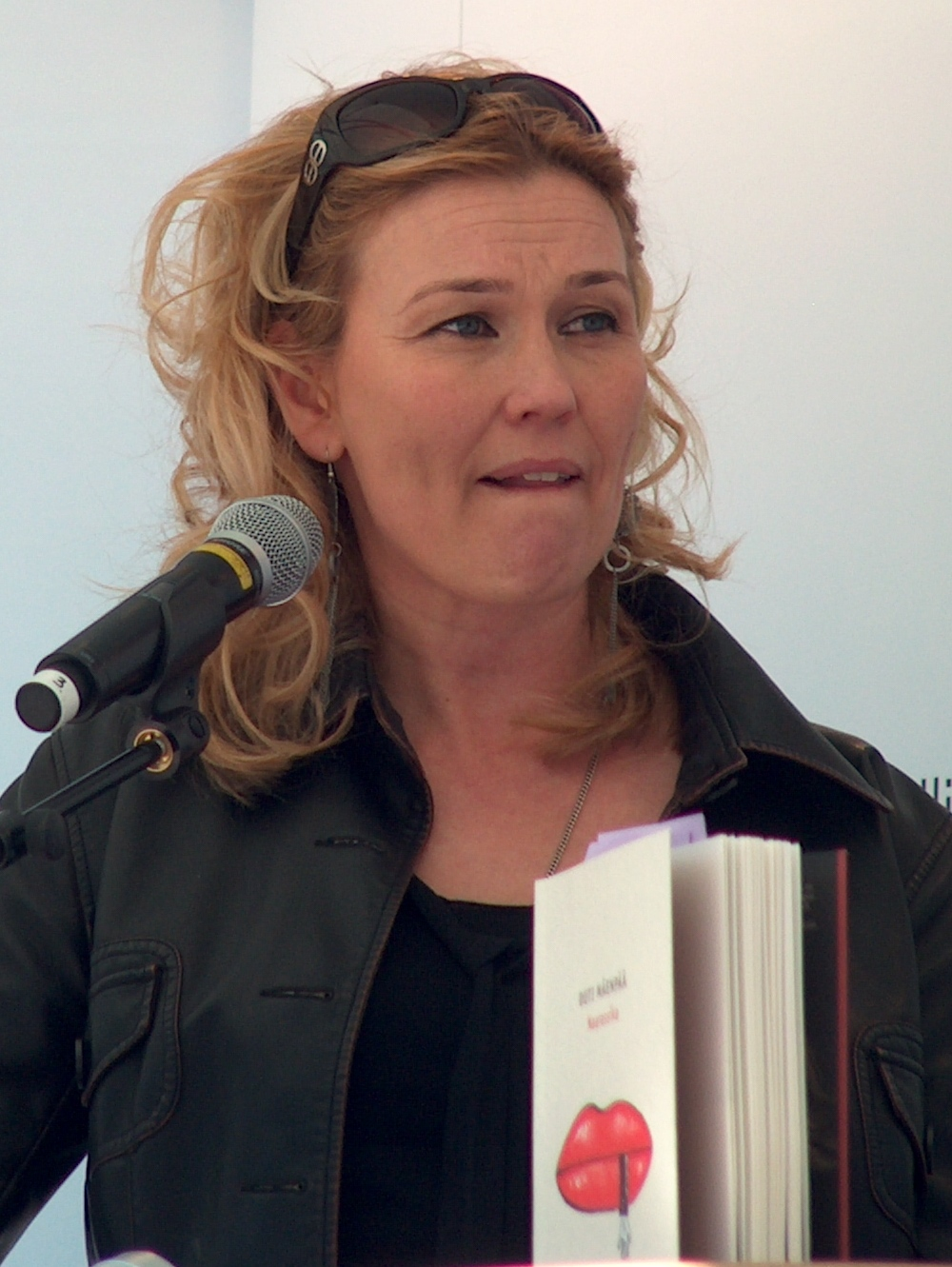
- Mäenpää in 2008
- Born: 24 February 1962 (age 63); Helsinki, Finland
- Occupation: Actress

Awards
- Best Actress Venla; 2002 Muodollisesti pätevä Best Performer Venla; 2005 Noriko Show; Best Actress Jussi; 2001 Lomalla; 2005 Kukkia ja sidontaa 2008 Musta jää Best Supporting Actress Jussi; 2004 Helmiä ja sikoja

Outi Mäenpää (born 24 February 1962) is a Finnish actress. She began her career in theatre as a stage actor between 1984 and 1988.

== Life ==
She was born February 1962 in Helsinki.

Since 1989 she has appeared regularly on Finnish television, with over 40 appearances to date. She appeared in the 2006 film Saippuaprinssi, working with actors such as Mikko Leppilampi and Pamela Tola. In October 2007 she starred in the Finnish movie Musta jää (Black Ice). She appeared in the 2010 Swedish drama Beyond, for which she won a Guldbagge Award for Best Supporting Actress. She appeared in Beyond Dreams (2017). She played the lead role in Vuosisadan häät (2021).

== Filmography ==
- The Match Factory Girl (1990)
- Lipton Cockton in the Shadows of Sodoma (1995)
- Trains'n'Roses (1998)
- Juha (1999)
- Sincerely Yours in Cold Blood (21 episodes, 2000–2005)
- Tappava Säde (2002)
- The Man Without a Past (2002)
- Bad Boys (2003)
- Black Ice (2007)
- Beyond (2010)
- The Kiss of Evil (2011)
- Call Girl (2012)
- Little Wing (2016)
- Beyond Dreams (2017)
- Vuosisadan häät (2021)
