= Comeback (2023 film) =

- Directed by: Petri Kotwica
- Screenplay by: Aleksi Bardy; Petri Karra
- Based on: Story by Petri Karra
- Produced by: Aleksi Bardy
- Starring: Mikko Leppilampi; Ville Myllyrinne; Paula Vesala; Anni Iikkanen
- Cinematography: Heikki Färm
- Edited by: Toni Tikkanen
- Music by: Tuomas Kantelinen
- Production company: Helsinki-filmi
- Distributed by: Aurora Studios
- Release date: 6 October 2023
- Running time: 98 minutes
- Country: Finland
- Language: Finnish
- Budget: €1,500,000 (with €600,000 support from the Finnish Film Foundation)

Comeback is a Finnish film directed by Petri Kotwica and released on October 6, 2023. Written by Petri Karra and Aleksi Bardy, the movie follows a group of former rock stars who reconnect for a comeback, facing unexpected challenges along the way.

The film stars Mikko Leppilampi, Ville Myllyrinne, Paula Vesala, and Anni Iikkanen in leading roles, with supporting performances from Pamela Tola, Marja Packalén, Mari Perankoski, Kirsi Ylijoki, Armi Toivanen, and Vuokko Hovatta.

The film was produced by Helsinki-filmi and distributed by Aurora Studios.

Its official soundtrack features the song "Diving Deep", released on August 24, 2023. Performed by Noora Louhimo, the track was written by Risto Asikainen, composed and produced by Jonas Olsson, with contributions from guitarist Nino Laurenne and drummer Gas Lipstick.

== Reception ==
The film received mixed reviews.
