= Kotwica (surname) =

Kotwica is a Polish surname. Notable people with the surname include:

- Ben Kotwica (born 1974), American football coach
- Petri Kotwica (born 1964), Finnish film director and screenwriter
