= Enkeleitä ja pikkupiruja =

- Country of origin: Finland

Original release
- Network: Yle TV1
- Release: 1998 – 1998

Enkeleitä ja pikkupiruja is a Finnish television series. It aired on Finnish TV in 1998.

== Cast ==
- Tarja Saikkonen – Annikki Tuiskula, koulun rehtori, äiti
- Saku Kautto – Jussi Tuiskula, isä
- Salla Häkkinen – Inkeri Tuiskula, perheen esikoinen
- Ronnie Andersson – Tuukka Tuiskula, kuudesluokkalainen
- Matias Arosuo – Jaakko Tuiskula, kolmasluokkalainen
- Joona Moilanen – Petteri Tuiskula, perheen kuopus
- Inkeri Kivimäki – Katariina Jantti, äiti
- Kauko Lindfors – Pekka Jantti, isä
- Riina Sivén – Henna Jantti, kuudesluokkalainen
- Tuomas Närvä – Markus Jantti, kolmasluokkalainen
- Aaro Partanen – Leevi Pelkonen, isä
- Elina Lehtisalmi – Marianne Pelkonen, äiti
- Heli Partanen – Maria Pelkonen, kuudesluokkalainen
- Mikko Lempinen – Samuel Pelkonen, kolmasluokkalainen
- Teijo Eloranta – Aulis Toivola, isä
- Riikka Luoma – Tanja Toivola, kuudesluokkalainen
- Enni Tuovinen – Milla Toivola, kolmasluokkalainen
- Auni Tuovinen – Niina Toivola, kolmasluokkalainen
- Kirsti Kuosmanen – Reettamari Uusikylä, äiti
- Joni Virtanen – Ossi Uusikylä, kuudesluokkalainen
- Peppe Forsblom – Jacob Sandberg, isä
- Satu Hindrea – Maija Sandberg, äiti
- Henri Valonen – Kim Sandberg, kuudesluokkalainen
- Linda Wallgren – Janica Sandberg, kolmasluokkalainen

== See also ==
- List of Finnish television series
