= Teijo Eloranta =

Finnish actor and television writer

- Born: 3 January 1960 (age 65); Hämeenlinna, Finland
- Other names: Maisteri T
- Occupations: Actor; television writer; blues musician

Teijo Eloranta (born 3 January 1960) is a Finnish actor, television writer and blues musician. His stage name is Maisteri T.

== Career ==
Born in Hämeenlinna, Finland, Eloranta began his career in 1991 in television appearing chiefly on TV between then and 2003. However, since 2003 he has increasingly moved into film. In the 2006 film Saippuaprinssi he worked with actors such as Mikko Leppilampi and Pamela Tola.

== Personal life ==
Eloranta was married to actress Mari Rantasila.

== Partial filmography ==
=== Film ===
- Saippuaprinssi (2006)
- Ricky Rapper and the Bicycle Thief (Risto Räppääjä ja polkupyörävaras, 2010)
- Princess (Prinsessa, 2010)

=== Television ===
- Kotikatu (1995, 2002, 2007–2008)
- Enkeleitä ja pikkupiruja (1998)
- Salatut elämät (2001) – Esko Heikkilä
- Bordertown (Sorjonen, 2019)
- Hautalehto (2021, TV)

== Discography ==
- Turpa kiinni ja tanssi (2012)
- Voodoo-mies (2015)
