= Hautalehto =

- Genre: Drama
- Written by: Veli-Pekka Hänninen
- Directed by: Petri Kotwica
- Starring: Mikko Leppilampi; Onni Parviainen; Antti Reini; Oona Airola; Iikka Forss; Teijo Eloranta; Marja Salo
- Country of origin: Finland
- No. of episodes: 14

Production
- Producers: Rimbo Salomaa; Jukka Helle; Markus Selin
- Production company: Solar Films

Original release
- Network: C More, MTV Katsomo
- Release: 2021 – present

Hautalehto is a Finnish crime drama series that premiered in 2021 on C More. Based on the Antti Hautalehto novel series by Christian Rönnbacka, the series was directed by Petri Kotwica and written by Veli-Pekka Hänninen. The titular role is played by Mikko Leppilampi. The second series aired on MTV Katsomo on 15 February 2024.

== Synopsis ==
The series revolves around criminal inspector Antti Hautalehto, who is faced with complicated cases in the Finnish city of Porvoo.

== Cast ==
=== S1 –Hautalehto: Freezing Embrace ===
Cast included:

- Mikko Leppilampi as Antti Hautalehto
- Onni Parviainen as Tero Lindfors
- Iikka Forss as Simon Kangas
- Antti Reini as Tarmo Lindfors
- Teijo Eloranta as Karl Berglund
- Oona Airola as Jonna Holm
- Marja Salo as Leena Karhimo
- Inka Kallén as Laura Hautalehto
- Christian Rönnbacka as Raimo Lampi

=== S2 – Hautalehto: Building 31 ===
- Mikko Leppilampi as Antti Hautalehto
- Jemina Sillanpää as Suvi Vettenranta
- Onni Parviainen as Tero Lindfors
- Antti Reini as Tarmo Lindfors
- Oona Airola as Jonna Holm
- Iikka Forss as Simon Kangas
- Teijo Eloranta as Karl Berglund
- Marja Salo as Leena Karhimo

== Production ==
The series is based on the Antti Hautalehto novel series by Christian Rönnbacka. It was directed by Petri Kotwica, written by Veli-Pekka Hänninen, and produced by Solar Films, with producers Rimbo Salomaa, Jukka Helle, and Markus Selin.

The first season, Hautalehto: Kylmä syli, (Hautalehto: Freezing Embrace) is based on the fourth book in the novel series. In addition to Leppilampi, the cast includes Onni Parviainen, Antti Reini, Oona Airola, Iikka Forss, Teijo Eloranta, and Marja Salo.

== Release and reception ==
Season 1 of Hautalehto was released in 2021. It became the most-streamed original series ever on C More.

The second season, Hautalehto: Rakennus 31, premiered on MTV Katsomo on 15 February 2024. It broke viewership records, becoming MTV's most-watched original series.
