= 21 Ways to Ruin a Marriage =

- Theatrical poster
- Finnish: 21 tapaa pilata avioliitto
- Directed by: Johanna Vuoksenmaa
- Written by: Johanna Vuoksenmaa
- Produced by: Riina Hyytiä
- Starring: Armi Toivanen; Aku Hirviniemi; Riku Nieminen; Essi Hellén
- Cinematography: Jan Nyman
- Edited by: Antti Reikko
- Music by: Kerkko Koskinen
- Production company: Dionysos Films
- Distributed by: Oy Nordisk Film Ab
- Release date: 8 February 2013
- Country: Finland
- Language: Finnish

21 Ways to Ruin a Marriage (Finnish: 21 tapaa pilata avioliitto) is a 2013 Finnish film written and directed by Johanna Vuoksenmaa. It was the highest grossing locally produced movie of the year in Finland.

== Main cast ==
- Armi Toivanen as Sanna Manner
- Essi Hellén as Aino
- Riku Nieminen as Aleksi
- Aku Hirviniemi as Jouni
- Pamela Tola as Elli
- Hannele Lauri as Eila Manner
- Jarkko Niemi as Lauri
