= Black Ice (2007 film) =

- Finnish theatrical poster
- Finnish: Musta jää
- Directed by: Petri Kotwica
- Written by: Petri Kotwica
- Produced by: Kai Nordberg; Kaarle Aho; Steffen Reuter; Patrick Knippel; Leander Carell
- Starring: Outi Mäenpää; Martti Suosalo; Ria Kataja; Ville Virtanen; Saara Paavolainen
- Cinematography: Harri Räty
- Edited by: Jukka Nykänen
- Music by: Eicca Toppinen
- Production companies: Making Movies Oy; Schmidtz Katze Filmkollektiv
- Distributed by: Sandrew Metronome
- Release dates: September 2007 (Helsinki); 19 October 2007 (Finland)
- Running time: 100 minutes
- Countries: Finland; Germany
- Languages: English; Finnish
- Budget: €1.8 million
- Box office: $1.6 million

Black Ice (Finnish: Musta jää) is a 2007 Finnish drama film written and directed by Petri Kotwica. Produced as a Finnish-German joint production, it stars actors Outi Mäenpää, Martti Suosalo and Ria Kataja in a twisted love triangle.

The film was first screened at the Helsinki International Film Festival on 26 September 2007 before being released to the Finnish movie theaters on 19 October 2007.

Black Ice was nominated for nine Jussi Awards, eventually winning five, including Best Lead Actress (Outi Mäenpää) and Best Film. Petri Kotwica was also nominated for Best Director at the Berlin International Film Festival as was Ria Kataja for her role as Tuuli at the Festroia International Film Festival.

== Plot ==
Musta jää is a psychological Ménage à trois, where two women compete for the same man. Saara is a doctor who finds out her husband, an architecture teacher, is having an affair with a young student called Tuuli. Saara develops a new identity so she can befriend her husband's mistress. The movie takes place in Helsinki. The Canadian film If I Were You (2012), starring Marcia Gay Harden, Leonor Watling and Aidan Quinn reworks a similar storyline.

== Cast ==
- Outi Mäenpää as Saara, the wife. After finding out that her husband is cheating on her, Saara decides to create a new identity as Crista and befriends her husband's mistress in order to find out what he sees in her.
- Martti Suosalo as Leo, the husband. An architecture teacher who seems to enjoy the attention he receives from his students. It is revealed by Tuuli that she is not the first affair he's had.
- Ria Kataja as Tuuli, as the mistress. A student under Leo's tutelage, she eventually comes to perceive Saara's alter ego as a friend only to realize that something is not right.
- Ville Virtanen as Ilkka, Leo's business partner and Lea's husband.
- Sara Paavolainen as Lea, Leo's sister. She works at the hospital with Saara.

Other cast members include: Netta Heikkilä as Krista; Väinö Heiskanen as Joonas; Philipp Danne as Uwe; Matti Laine as Komu; Emilia Sinisalo as Receptionist; and Anne von Keller as Nurse.

== Soundtrack ==
The soundtrack for Black Ice was written by Eicca Toppinen of the band Apocalyptica. The song "Black Ice" was released by Hanna Pakarinen as a promotional single for the film. A music video, depicting scenes from the film was also released. Lyrics for the theme song were written by Johnny Andrews.

1. "Interlude" - 3:29
2. "Deception" - 3:26
3. "Alone in the Dark" - 4:02
4. "New Start" - 1:37
5. "Caesarean" - 2:59
6. "Cooma II" - 6:39
7. "Terror" - 4:01
8. "Dream" - 3:58
9. "Fragility" - 2:57
10. "Exposure" - 2:41
11. "Love Song" - 3:43
12. "Iced Plan" - 1:39
13. "Evil Ground" - 3:34
14. "Transformation" - 2:35
15. "Atonement" - 2:09
16. "Black Ice" (ft. Hanna Pakarinen) - 4:05

== Remake ==
Korean film Love, In Between is based on this film.
