= Vares: The Path of the Righteous Men =

2012 film

- Film poster
- Finnish: Vares – Kaidan tien kulkijat
- Directed by: Anders Engström
- Written by: Anders Engström; Mika Karttunen; Katariina Souri
- Produced by: Jukka Helle; Markus Selin
- Starring: Antti Reini
- Cinematography: Jean-Noel Mustonen
- Release date: 6 January 2012
- Running time: 97 minutes
- Country: Finland
- Language: Finnish

Vares: The Path of the Righteous Men (Finnish: Vares – Kaidan tien kulkijat) is a 2012 Finnish crime film directed by Anders Engström and it is the sixth installment of the Vares film series. The film is the only of the film series where Jasper Pääkkönen doesn't appear as Kyypakkaus or any other character.

== Cast ==
- Antti Reini as Jussi Vares
- Peter Franzén as preacher Taisto Raappana
- Jarmo Mäkinen as Juhana Sulander
- Matti Onnismaa as priest Alanen
- Petteri Summanen as officer Larva
- Eppu Salminen as Juhani Luusalmi
- Merja Larivaara as Elisabeth Raappana
- Markku Maalismaa as priest Hukkanen
- Kari-Pekka Toivonen as senior physician Sulo Hento
- Pekka Huotari as Kalle Riutta
- Aake Kalliala as Paskamantteli the village idiot
- Kari Tapio as himself
