= Noriko Show =

Finnish television show

- Genre: Comedy
- Written by: Jens Helin, Mikko Kivinen
- Starring: Outi Mäenpää
- Country of origin: Finland
- Original languages: English; Finnish
- No. of seasons: 2
- No. of episodes: 20

Production
- Running time: 25 minutes
- Production company: Metronome

Original release
- Network: SubTV
- Release: 2004 – 2004

Noriko Show was a Finnish Candid Camera style talk show inspired in Wendy van Dijk's character Ushi Hirosaki. Its two seasons were aired in 2004. The character Noriko Saru (played by Finnish actress Outi Mäenpää) is a Japanese reporter who meets famous Finnish people. The premise of the joke, aside from the fact that she is not Japanese, is that Noriko does not speak English very well. The celebrity usually cannot understand her and her questions. At the end of the interview, after giving a photograph of herself face down, saying that it is Noriko, Mäenpää removes her wig, glasses and false teeth.

Noriko Show ran on Subtv on Saturdays and Sundays at 7.30 pm and 4.45 pm.
