= Emilia Vuorisalmi =

Finnish writer, television presenter and physician (born 1979)

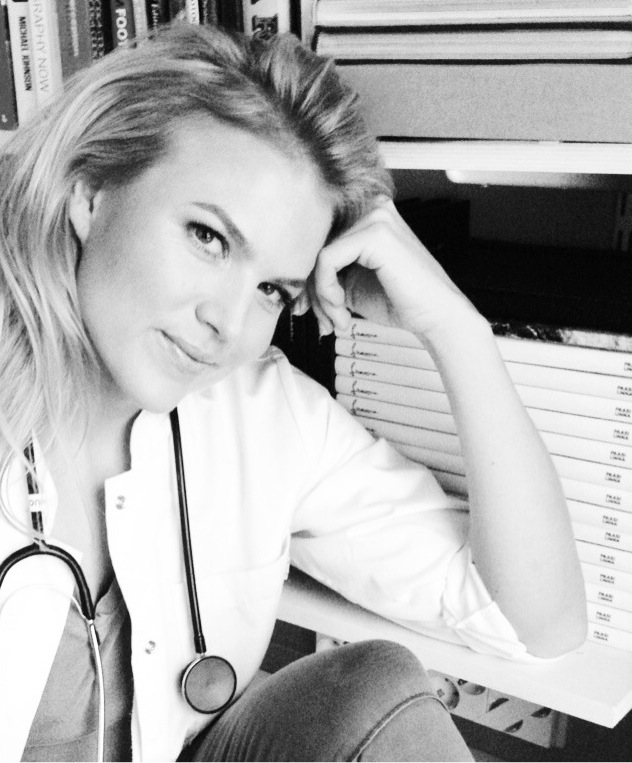
Emilia Vuorisalmi, MD

Emilia Vuorisalmi (born February 1, 1979) is a Finnish medical doctor, TV personality and an entrepreneur from Helsinki.

== Medical work ==
Vuorisalmi holds a medical doctorate degree from Helsinki University and is, as of 2014, a private practitioner. She is currently working at Mehiläinen, Finland's leading private healthcare service. She has also worked as the team doctor for the Finnish basketball league team Helsinki Seagulls. Vuorisalmi has written two books about the science behind love and is known as the Love Doctor of Finland.

== Television work ==
In 2014, Vuorisalmi hosted, together with Kiti Kokkonen and Elina Tanskanen, the newly launched TV show Hehku (Glow). Hehku is a weekly prime time chronicle airing on the Finnish National Television channel YLE 2. The topics dealt with range from health and beauty treatments, sports and well-being activities to overall issues that concern modern day Finnish women and girls.

In 2021, Vuorisalmi starred in one of the leading roles in Finnish romantic comedy series Kullannuput (Yle).

Vuorisalmi hosts her own podcast DocEmilia - Terveys 360 at Supla since 2020.

== Writing ==
In August 2015, Vuorisalmi published her first book Sekaisin LOVEsta which is a scientific exploration of the issues of falling in love and being in a relationship. In it, she discusses the effects of hormones and stress on maintaining a successful relationship as well as attempts to answer why we fall in love in the first place and why we break-up. The book is published by Otava Publishing Company Ltd from Finland.

In October 2020, Vuorisalmi's second book Rakkaus haltuun was published by WSOY (Bonnier Group). Rakkaus haltuun is a practical guide for anyone who wants to take full control over their health and happiness in life. With the base understanding that our mental and physical wellbeing are inextricably linked, it explains how our hormones work together in our bodies and affect our moods, behaviors and physical health daily and on multiple levels.

== Personal life ==
Vuorisalmi was married to actor Mikko Leppilampi from 2006 to 2010. The two have a daughter, Lilia (born 2005).
