= Armi Toivanen =

Finnish actress

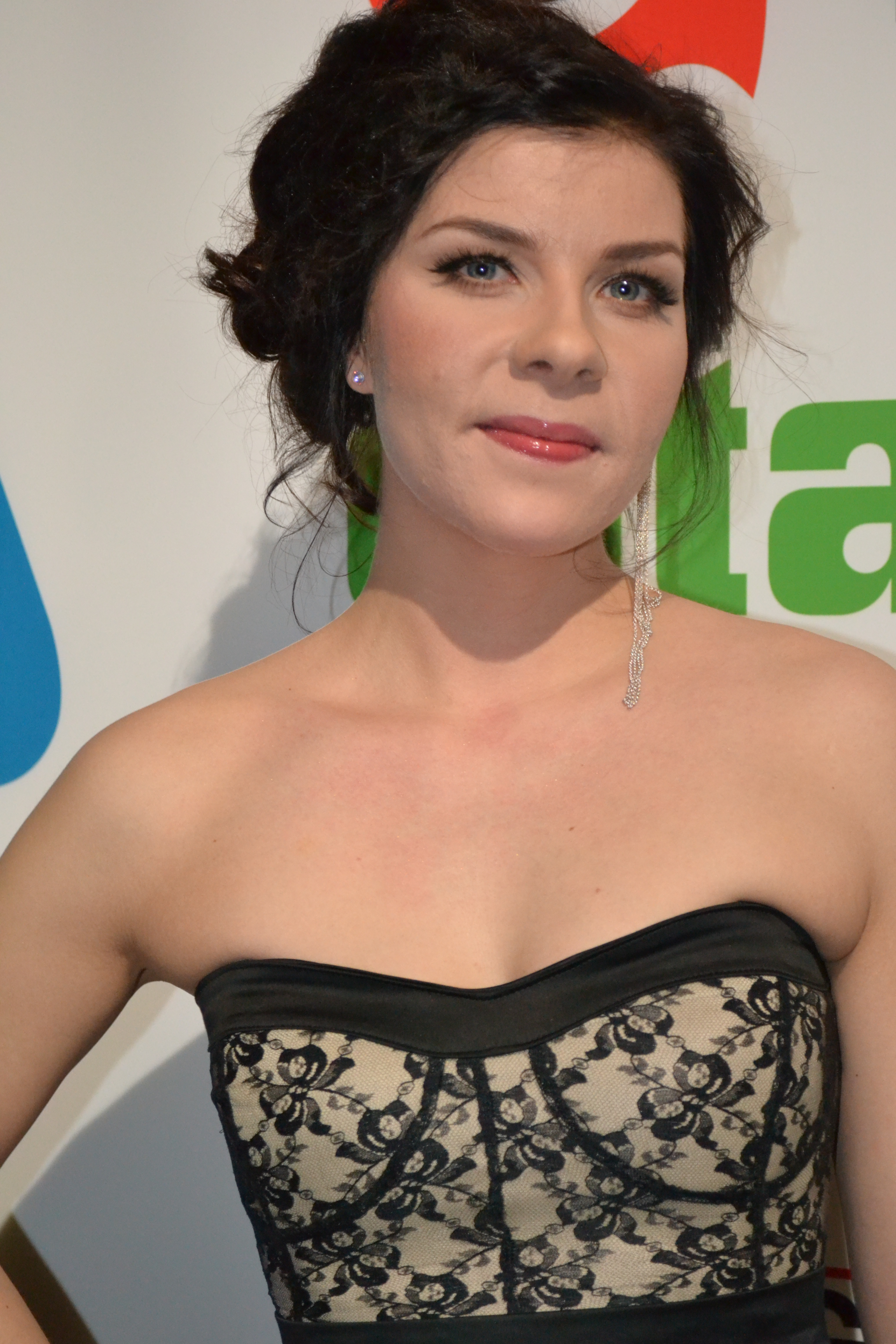
Toivanen in 2013

Armi Toivanen (born 19 June 1980 in Tampere) is a Finnish actress. She became a household name in Finland after joining the cast of the sketch comedy television show Putous in its third season in 2012. Her character Leena Hefner o.s. Herppeenluoma was crowned as the "sketch comedy character of the year". In addition to her television work, Toivanen has been seen on stage and in films.

== Personal life ==
Armi Toivanen's identical twin sister Alina Toivanen has been working as a drummer in groups such as Risto and Minä ja Ville Ahonen.

== Selected filmography ==
=== In films ===
- Rööperi (2009)
- Ella ja kaverit (2012)
- 21 tapaa pilata avioliitto (2013)
- Kaappari (2013)
- Päin seinää (2014)
- Elämältä kaiken sain (2015)
- Comeback (2023)

=== On television ===
- Katve (2007)
- Ihmebantu (2009)
- Tappajan näköinen mies (2011)
- Putous (2012–2014)
- Paparazzit (2012)
- Kingi (2014)
