= Antti Reini =

Finnish actor (born 1964)

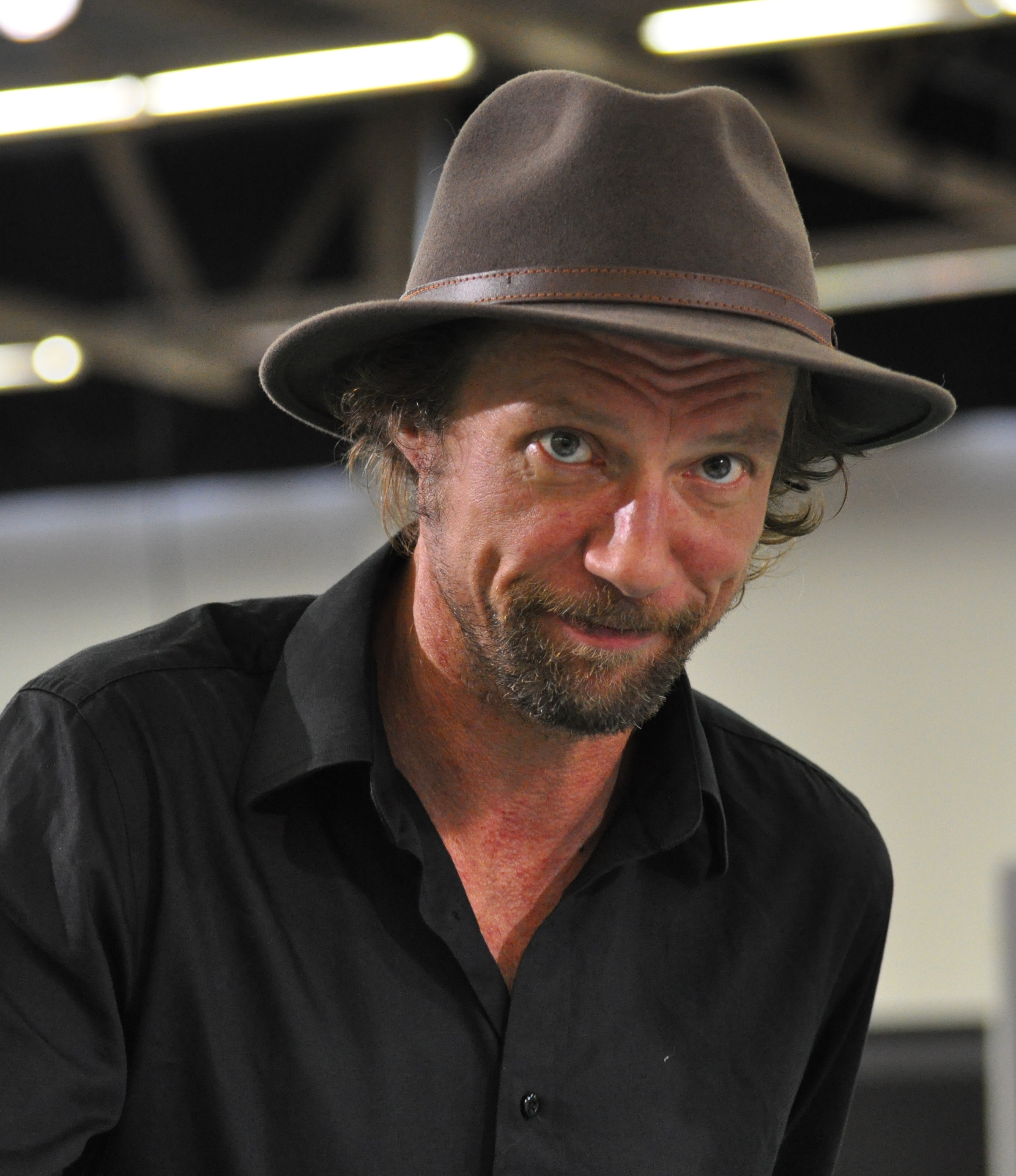
- Born: 27 August 1964 (age 61); Helsinki, Finland
- Occupation: Actor
- Years active: 1991–present

Antti Reini (born 27 August 1964) is a Finnish film actor.

== Career ==
At the 27th Guldbagge Awards he was nominated for the award for Best Actor for his role in Il Capitano: A Swedish Requiem.

Seven films (2011–2015) made from the Vares novels by Reijo Mäki feature Antti Reini; the first six of these (2011–2012) have been released on DVD in Region 1.

== Selected filmography ==
=== Cinema ===
- Il Capitano: A Swedish Requiem (1991)
- The Christmas Party (1996)
- As White as in Snow (2001)
- The Life of Aleksis Kivi (2002)
- The Man Without a Past (2002)
- Helmiä ja sikoja (2003)
- Solstorm (2007)
- Everlasting Moments (2008)
- Stone's War (2008)
- The House of Branching Love (2009)
- Angel (2009)
- Beyond the Border (2011)
- The Kiss of Evil (2011)
- The Girls of April (2011)
- Garter Snake (2011)
- The Path of the Righteous Men (2012)
- Vares: Gambling Chip (2012)
- Vares: Tango of Darkness (2012)
- Vares: The Sheriff (2015)
- Devil's Bride (2016)

=== TV ===
- Sincerely Yours in Cold Blood (29 episodes, 2000–2005)
- Tusenbröder (2003)
- Tatort – Tango für Borowski (2010 – Crime Scene, German crime television series)
- Cold Courage (2020)
- Hautalehto (2021)
- The Machinery (14 episodes, 2020, 2022)
