= Mikko Leppilampi =

Finnish actor and musician (born 1978)

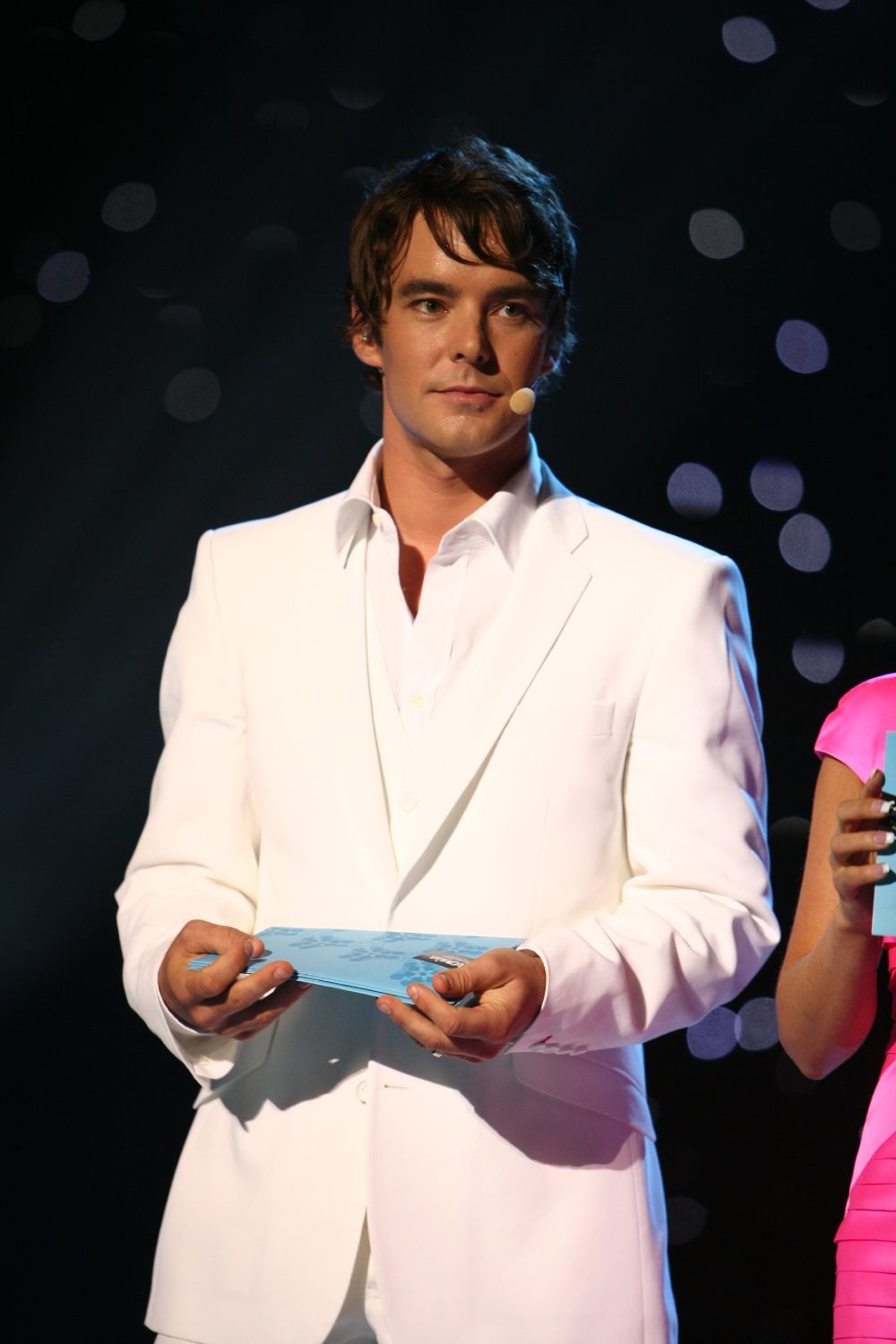
- Born: Mikko Johannes Leppilampi; 22 September 1978 (age 47); Pälkäne, Finland
- Occupations: Actor, musician
- Years active: 2003—present
- Spouses: Emilia Vuorisalmi (m. 2006–2010) Maryam Razavin (m. 2011–2018): Beata Papp (m.2021)

Mikko Johannes Leppilampi (born 22 September 1978) is a Finnish actor, musician, and TV host. He is the son of Jukka Leppilampi (born 1954), a Finnish gospel musician. Leppilampi is considered to be one of the most promising stars of Finland's movie industry in the new millennium. He shot to fame as a result of his debut movie Helmiä ja sikoja, for which he also won a Jussi award.

== Career ==
In the 2005 film Kaksipäisen kotkan varjossa, he starred as a poet in the early 20th century when Finland was part of Russia, working with actors such as Vesa-Matti Loiri and director Timo Koivusalo.

In addition to acting, Leppilampi has been actively involved in the music scene. His first full-length album, which bears his name, was published on 10 May 2006. He has also sung on the soundtracks of some of the movies he has starred in.

On 10–12 May 2007, Leppilampi hosted the Eurovision Song Contest 2007 in Helsinki together with television host Jaana Pelkonen. In the 2008 edition he was the spokesperson for YLE, announcing the results of the Finnish televote.

At the 30. August 2018 began Leppilampi presenting Jahti, the Finnish version of The Chase quiz show.

== Personal life ==
Leppilampi has a daughter with Emilia Vuorisalmi, whom he married in summer 2006. They filed for divorce in spring 2010.

He has a brother who plays in a Finnish rock band called SleepWalkers.

== Filmography ==
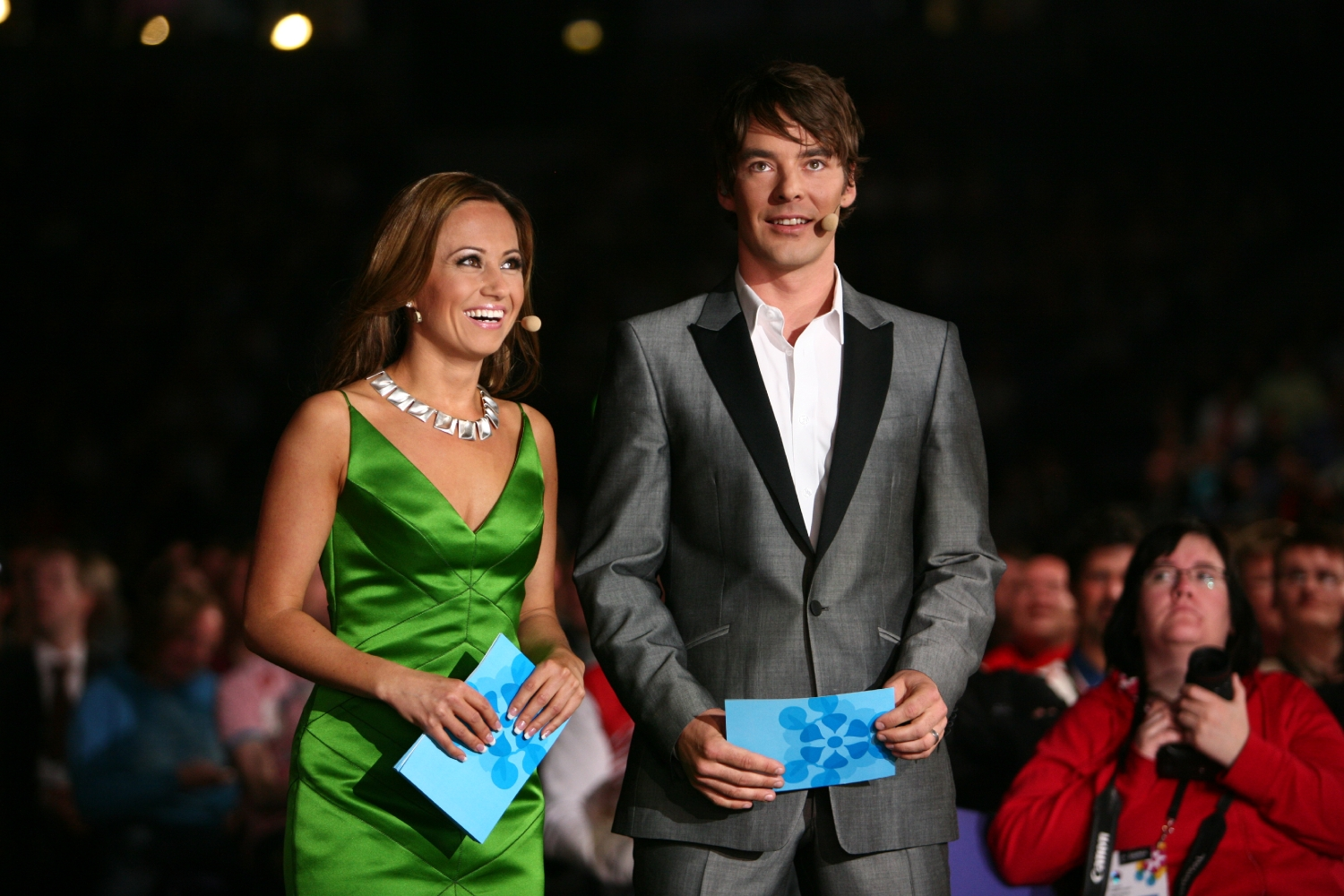
Leppilampi with Jaana Pelkonen at the 2007 Eurovision Song Contest

=== Film ===
- Helmiä ja sikoja (2003)
- Keisarikunta (2004)
- Paha maa (2005)
- Kaksipäisen kotkan varjossa (2005)
- Tyttö sinä olet tähti (2005)
- Narnian Tarinat : Velho ja Leijona (voice) (2005)
- Madagascar (voice) (2005)
- Hairspray-musikaali (2005)
- Saippuaprinssi (2006)
- Joulutarina (2007)
- 8 päivää ensi-iltaan (2008)
- Pihalla (2009)
- The Hustlers (2010)
- The Italian Key (2011)
- The Kiss of Evil (2011)
- War of the Dead (2011)
- Härmä (2012)
- 8-pallo (2013)
- The Knocking (2022)
- Comeback (2023)

=== TV ===
- Tanssii tähtien kanssa (2010-2021) (host)
- Nymphs (Nymfit, 2014)
- Bordertown (Sorjonen, 2016—)
- Presidentti (2017—)
- Hautalehto (2021—)

== Discography ==
- Mikko Leppilampi (2006)

== See also ==
- List of Eurovision Song Contest presenters

| Preceded by (Greece) Sakis Rouvas & Maria Menounos | Eurovision Song Contest presenter (with Jaana Pelkonen); 2007 | Succeeded by (Serbia) Jovana Janković & Željko Joksimović |
