= Petri Kotwica =

Finnish film director and screenwriter (born 1964)

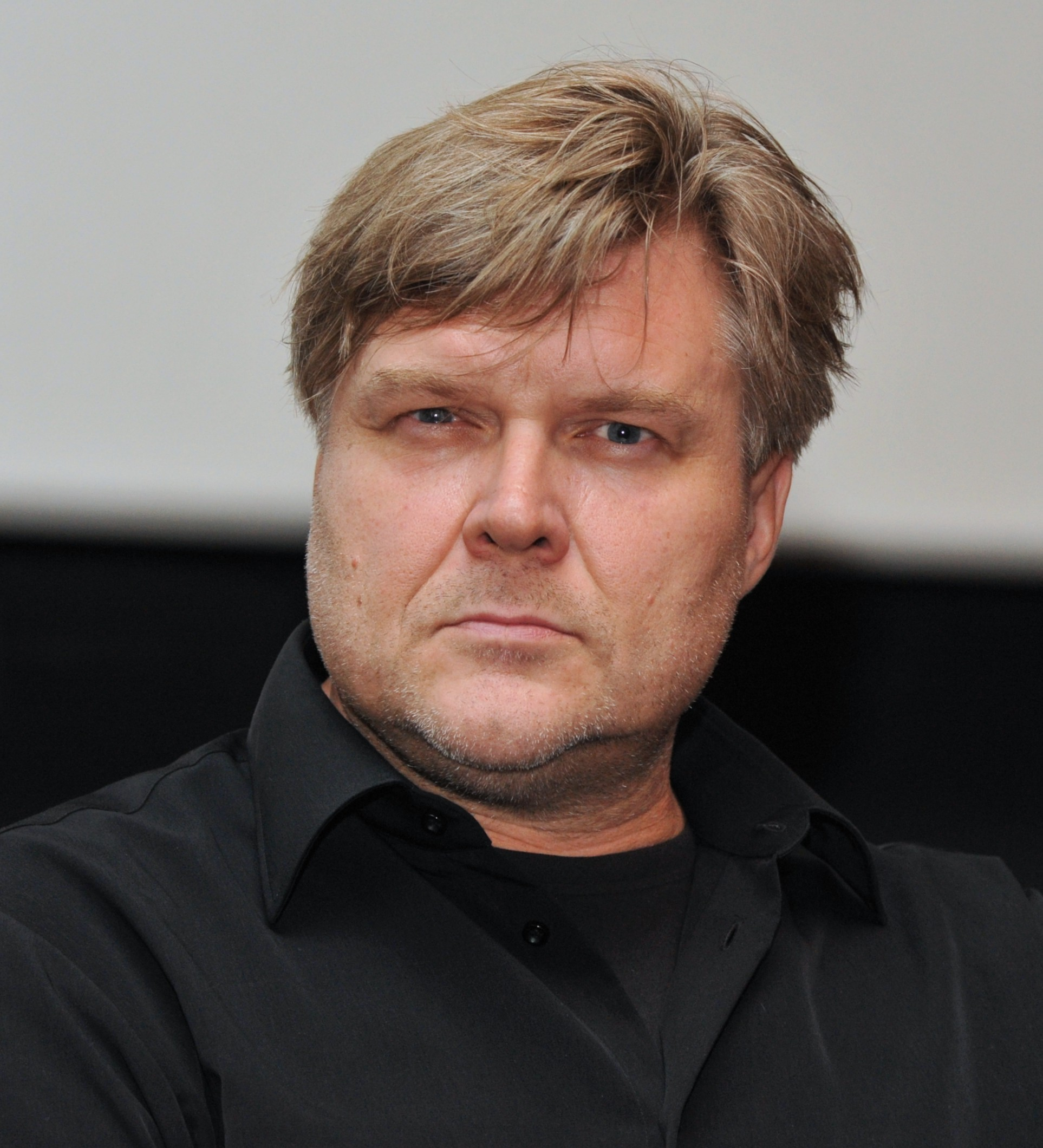
Kotwica in 2011

Petri Kotwica (born 17 April 1964 in Pargas) is a Finnish film director and screenwriter. He is best known for his 2007 film Black Ice for which he received Jussi Awards for Best Director and Best Screenwriter.

== Selected filmography ==
=== Films ===
- Koti-ikävä (2005)
- Black Ice (2007)
- Rat King (2012)
- Henkesi edestä (2015)
- Comeback (2023)

=== Television ===
- Kohtuuttomuuksia (2016)
- Hautalehto (2021)
- Piiritys (2023)
