= Lake Bodom murders =

1960 unsolved homicide in Espoo, Finland

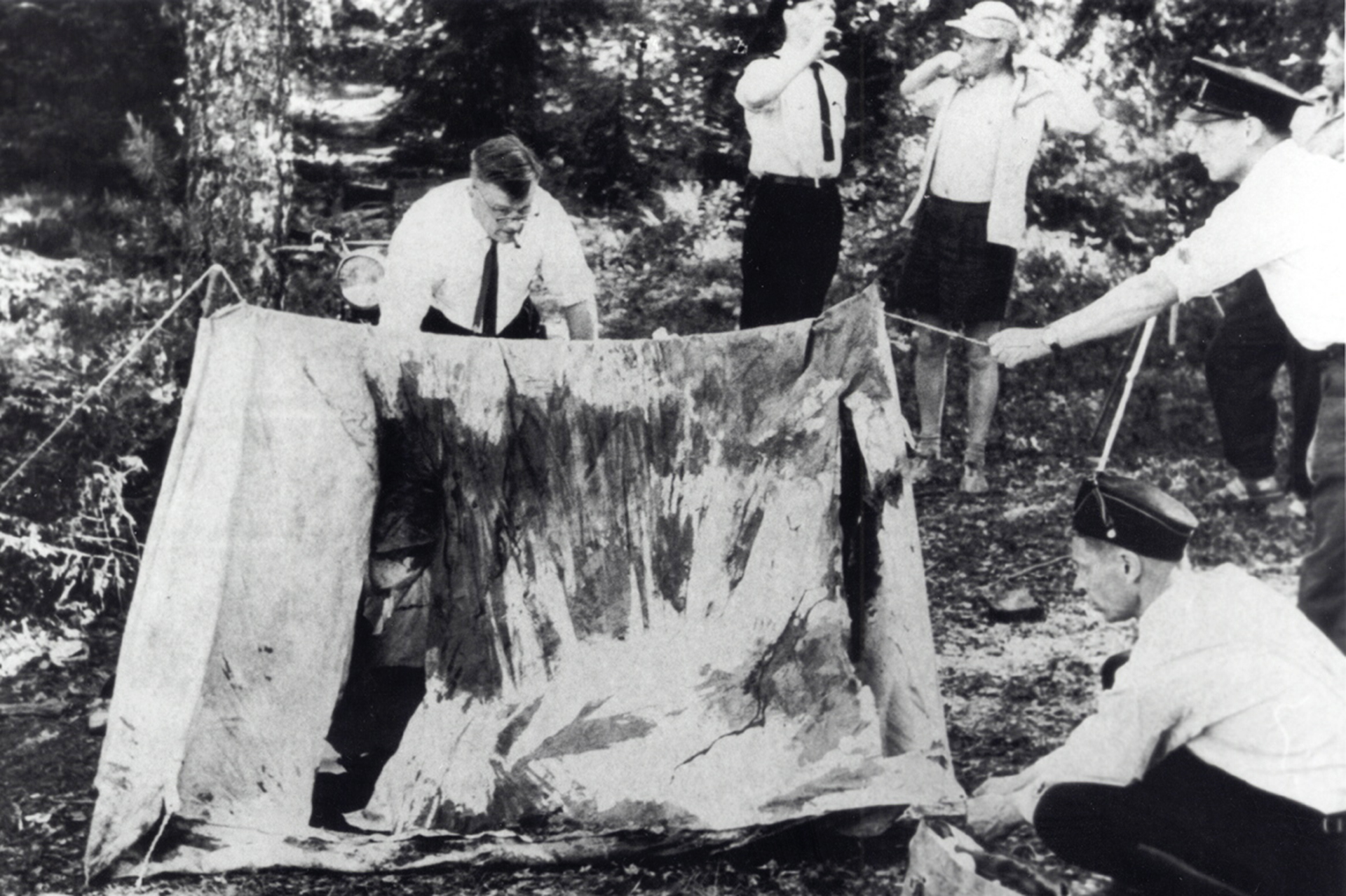
- Tent being investigated shortly after the Lake Bodom murders
- Location: Espoo, Uusimaa, Finland
- Date: Sunday, 5 June 1960; 66 years ago
- Attack type: Murder by stabbing, child murder
- Weapons: Knife, blunt instrument
- Deaths: 3
- Injuries: 1
- Perpetrator: Unknown
- Accused: Nils Gustafsson
- Charges: Murder
- Verdict: Not guilty
- Litigation: Lawsuit by Gustafsson against Finnish government for infliction of mental suffering settled for €44,900

The Lake Bodom murders is an unsolved 1960 homicide case in which three teenage campers were killed and another seriously injured in Finland. The case is one of the most notorious crimes in modern Finnish history.

Sometime between 4:00 a.m. and 6:00 a.m. (EET) on 5 June 1960, at Lake Bodom in Espoo, Uusimaa, Maila Irmeli Björklund (15), Anja Tuulikki Mäki (15), and Seppo Boisman (18) were killed by stabbing and blunt-force trauma to their heads while sleeping inside a tent. The fourth youth, Nils Gustafsson, then-aged 18, was found outside the tent with broken facial bones and stab wounds.

Despite extensive investigations, the perpetrator was never identified and various theories on the killer's identity have been presented over the years. Gustafsson was unexpectedly arrested on suspicion of committing the murders in 2004, but he was found not guilty the following year.

== Murders ==
On Saturday, 4 June 1960, four Finnish teenagers had decided to camp along the shore of Lake Bodom (Finnish: Bodominjärvi, Swedish: Bodom träsk), near the city of Espoo's Oittaa Manor. Maila Irmeli Björklund and Anja Tuulikki Mäki were both aged 15 at the time; accompanying them were their boyfriends, Seppo Antero Boisman and Nils Wilhelm Gustafsson, both aged 18.

Sometime between 4:00 a.m. and 6:00 a.m. on Sunday 5 June 1960, Mäki, Björklund and Boisman were all stabbed and bludgeoned to death by an unknown assailant. Gustafsson, the only survivor of the massacre, had fractured facial bones that appeared to confirm his story of being a victim. He stated afterwards that he had seen a glimpse of an attacker clothed in black with bright red eyes coming for them.

At about 6:00 a.m., a group of boys birdwatching some distance away had reportedly seen the tent collapse and a blond man walking away from the site. The bodies of the victims were discovered at about 11:00 a.m. by a carpenter named Esko Oiva Johansson. He alerted the police, who arrived on the scene at noon.

== Initial investigation ==
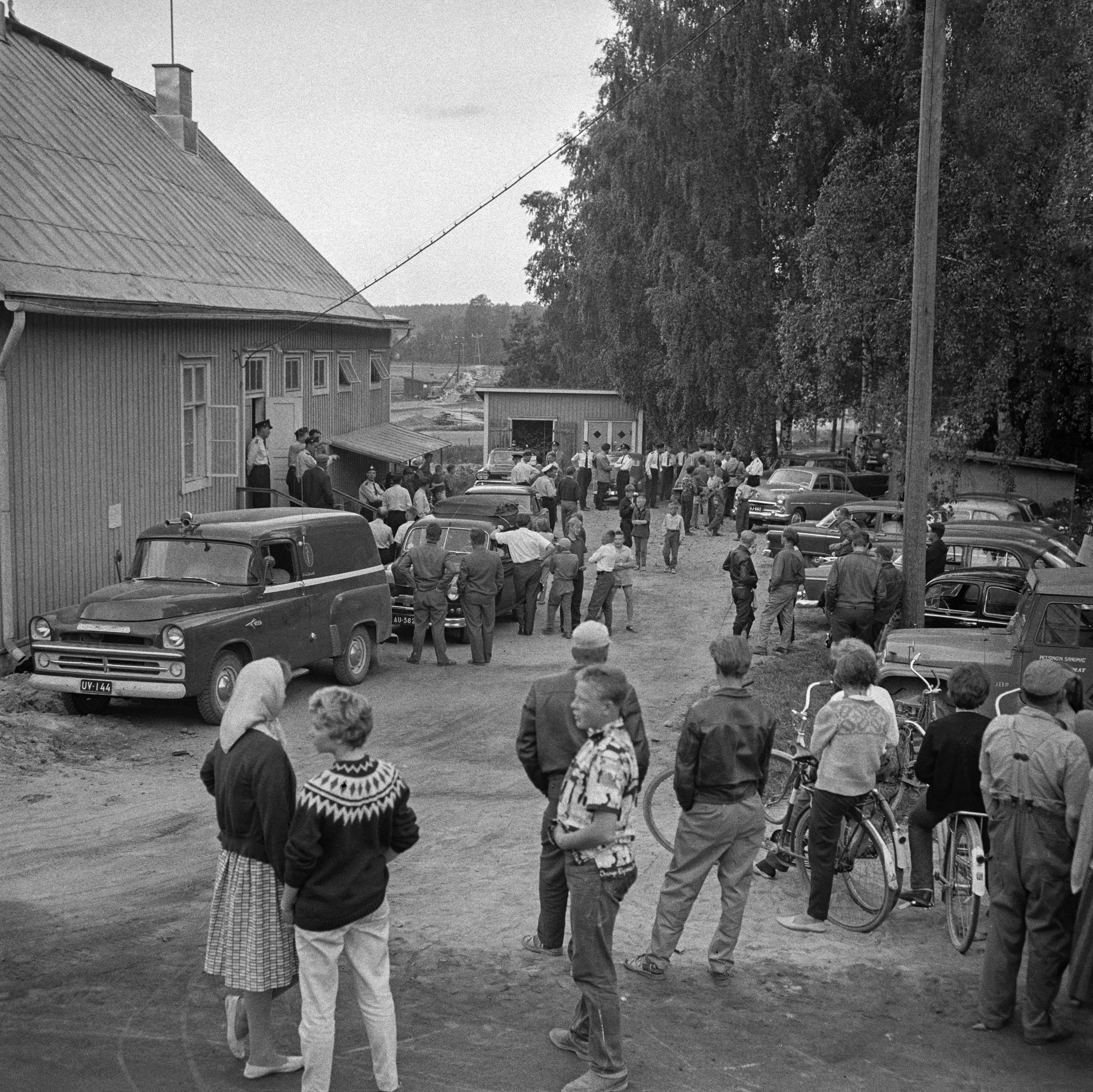
Investigations on the site of the murder

The killer had not injured the victims from inside the tent but instead had attacked the occupants from outside with a knife and an unidentified blunt instrument (possibly a rock) through the sides of the tent. The murder weapons have never been located. The killer had taken several items which detectives found puzzling, including the keys to the victims' motorcycles, which themselves had been left behind. Some of the missing clothing items, including Gustafsson's shoes, were found partially hidden approximately 500 metres from the murder site. The police did not cordon off the site nor record the details of the scene (later seen as a major error) and almost immediately allowed a crowd of police officers and other people to trample around and disturb the evidence. The mistake was further exacerbated by calling in soldiers to assist with the search around the lake for the missing items, several of which were never found.

Björklund, Gustafsson's girlfriend, was found undressed from the waist down and was lying on top of the tent, and had suffered the most injuries out of all of the victims. She was stabbed multiple times after her death, while the other two teenagers were slain with less brutality.

== Suspects ==
There have been numerous suspects over the course of the investigation of the Lake Bodom murders, but the following are the most notable.

=== Valdemar Gyllström ===
Many local people suspected Karl Valdemar Gyllström, a kiosk keeper from Oittaa known to have been hostile towards campers. Police found no hard evidence to link him to the murders. They were skeptical of supposed confessions he was said to have made because they considered him disturbed. He drowned in Lake Bodom in 1969, most likely by suicide. The people in the town knew Gyllström was violent, cut down tents, threw rocks at people who came to his street, and some later said that it was Gyllström they saw coming back from the murder scene but were too afraid to call the police about him. A book released in 2006 brings up the theory in detail. The book also claims that the police almost immediately ignored much more evidence that was previously unknown to the public because of language barriers, among other things.

=== Hans Assmann ===
Most public suspicion focused on Hans Assmann, a German-born naturalized Finnish citizen, who lived several kilometres from the shore of Lake Bodom. A series of popular books promulgated a theory of Assmann committing the Bodom killings and other murders. It was not taken seriously by the police, as Assmann had an alibi for the night of the Bodom murders (and was said to have been in Germany during the time of another murder). On the morning of June 6, 1960, however, he had shown up at a hospital in Helsinki with bloody clothes. He moved to Sweden, where he died in the late 1990s. Assmann was also a suspect in five other cases, even confessing to one on his death bed.

=== Pentti Soininen ===
During the mid-1960s, an individual named Pentti Soininen, known for his violent tendencies, claimed to a fellow inmate that he was responsible for the murders that occurred at Lake Bodom. However, he was approximately 14 years old at the time of the murders. Many question whether he could have single-handedly overpowered four older teenagers, casting doubt on his involvement.

== Arrest and trial of Nils Gustafsson ==
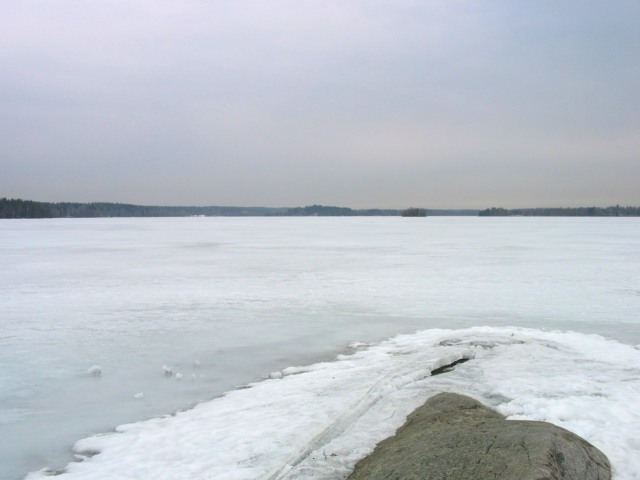
Lake Bodom in April 2004

In late March 2004, almost 44 years after the event, Gustafsson was arrested. In early 2005, the Finnish National Bureau of Investigation declared the case was solved based on new forensic analysis. According to the prosecution's interpretation of the bloodstains, Gustafsson had been drunk and excluded from the tent when he attacked the other boy, getting his jaw broken in a fight which escalated into him committing three murders.

The trial started on 4 August 2005. Gustafsson's defence lawyer argued that the murders were the work of one or more outsiders and that Gustafsson would have been incapable of killing three people given the extent of his injuries. It had always been known that the shoes worn by the killer and hidden by him 450 metres (500 yards) away from the tent belonged to Gustafsson, who was found barefoot on top of the tent. Modern DNA analysis was significant for the prosecution as it showed that the three murdered victims' blood was on Gustafsson's shoes, but Gustafsson's was absent.

The prosecution said it followed from the lack of Gustafsson's blood on the shoes, that his injuries had occurred at a different time to the attack on the murdered victims, and that the only explanation of this was that Gustafsson had committed the murders, then faked the theft of items by hiding them, further injured himself and then went back to the tent where (now barefoot) he pretended to be unconscious. The prosecution attempted to bolster their case by alleging an identification by two birdwatchers of Gustafsson as the tall blond man at the scene of the crime, an assertion that he had been overheard making an incriminating remark, and also that a decade after the event he had boasted to a woman about his guilt.

On 7 October 2005, Gustafsson was acquitted of all charges. The court explained the verdict as due to the prosecution's evidence being inconclusive, failure to show Gustafsson had a motive appropriate to a crime of such extreme seriousness, and certainty about the facts now being impossible given the time that had elapsed. The State of Finland paid him €44,900 for the mental suffering caused by the long remand time, but the public prosecutor refused to sue Finnish newspapers for defamation. Gustafsson did not use his right to bring charges against the newspapers as an injured party.

== In popular culture ==
=== Podcasts ===
The case was covered by:

- RedHanded in August 2017.
- De Volksjury in March 2018.
- My Favorite Murder on 28 June 2018, who also cited and heavily utilized this very article.
- Morbid: A True Crime Podcast on 28 August 2018.
- Casefile True Crime on 30 October 2021.
- Weird Crimes on 11th of August 2022.
- Heart Starts Pounding on 12 July 2023.
- MrBallen on 17 March 2024.
- Nexpo on 19 March 2025.
- Casebook on 18 June 2026.

== See also ==
- Lake Bodom (film) – a 2016 Finnish slasher horror film based on the murder case
- Children of Bodom – a Finnish melodic death metal band that is named after the lake.
- List of unsolved murders (1900–1979)
  - Murder of Kyllikki Saari – unsolved Finnish murder case from 1953
  - Oven homicide case – unsolved Finnish murder case from 1960
  - Viking Sally murder mystery – unsolved murder case from 1987, on board the ferry MS Viking Sally
  - Ulvila murder – unsolved Finnish murder case from 2006
