= Bodom =

Bodom can refer to:

- Lake Bodom, a lake in Finland
- Bodom (film), a 2016 Finnish horror film

== See also ==
- Children of Bodom
