= Kyllikki Saari =

Finnish murder victim (1935–1953)

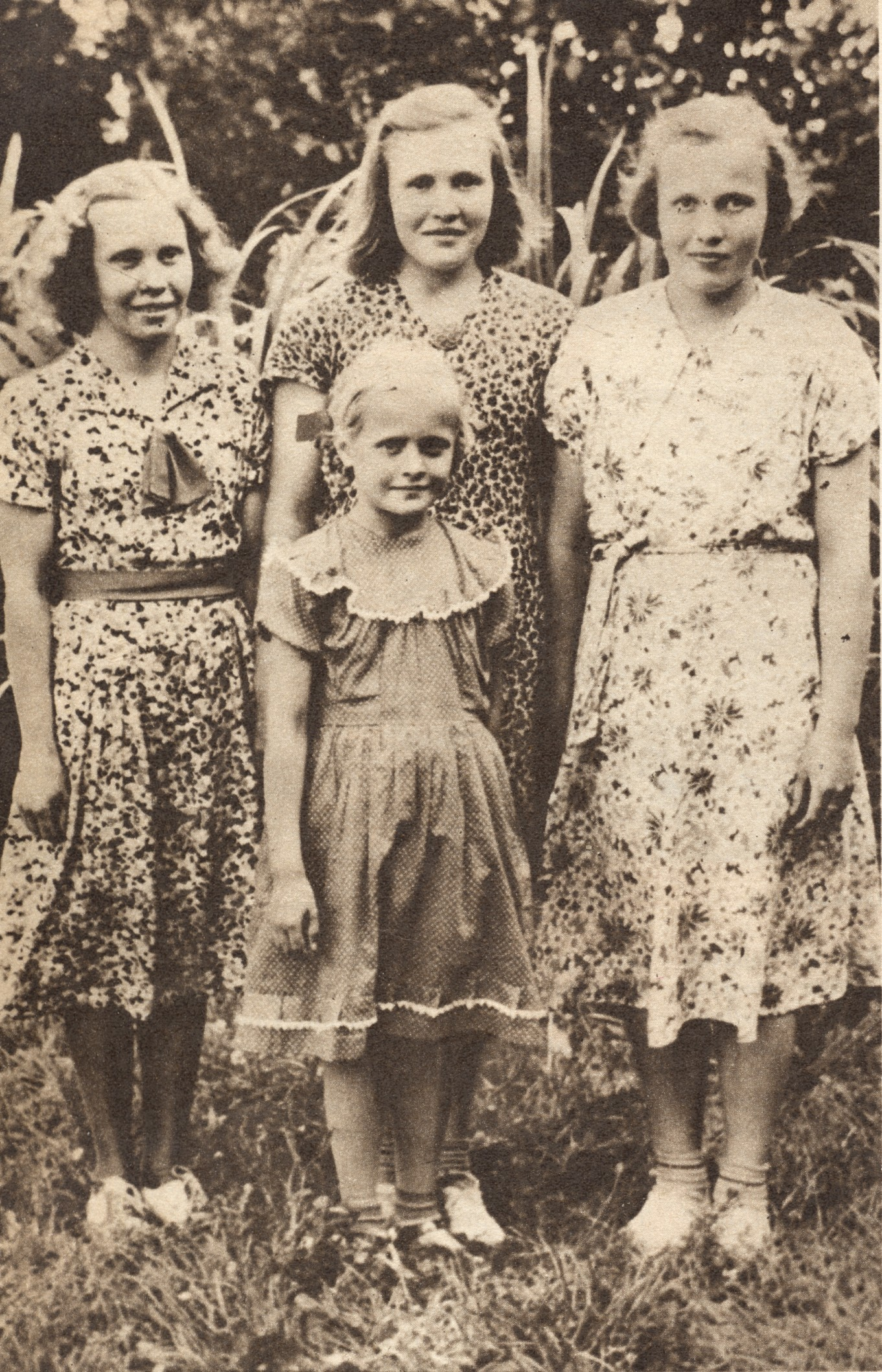
Kyllikki Saari (back right) with sisters

Auli Kyllikki Saari (6 December 1935 – 1953) was a 17-year-old Finnish girl whose murder in 1953 became one of the most infamous cases of homicide in Finland's history. Her murder in Isojoki remains unsolved.

== Background information ==
Kyllikki Saari was last seen alive on late evening 17 May 1953. She was cycling to her home from a prayer meeting, held in Kortteenkylä, Isojoki. It is believed she was attacked by an unidentified person. The authorities speculated that the murderer may have had a sexual motive, but no evidence has been produced to support this theory. Although the crime received notable media attention, the murderer has never been identified. Saari's remains were found on 11 October 1953. She was buried in a bog. Her bicycle was discovered in a marshy area earlier that year. Funeral services were held at Isojoki Church on 25 October; an estimated 25,000 people attended.

== Suspects ==
=== Kauko Kanervo ===
Initially, the prime suspect in the case was Kauko Kanervo, a parish priest who remained under investigation for several years. Kanervo had moved to Merikarvia three weeks before her disappearance and had been reported as having been in the area on the evening of Saari's disappearance. An investigation determined Kanervo had been dean of the party and spent the late night hours in the parsonage. With all but 20 minutes of his time accounted for, the authorities deduced the priest could not have had enough time to go to Isojoki (60 kilometres away from Merikarvia), as he did not have a driver's licence or an automobile.

=== Hans Assmann ===
The wife of Hans Assmann, an alleged KGB spy and suspect in the 1960 Lake Bodom murders, reported that her husband and his driver were near Isojoki at the time of the murder. Assmann also owned a light-brown Opel, the same type of car several witnesses had seen near the murder scene. Assmann's wife also reported that one of her husband's socks was missing and his shoes were wet when he returned home the evening of the murder. There were also dents in the car. A few days later, the two men allegedly left again, but this time they brought a shovel with them. Later investigators determined that Saari's murderer must have been left-handed, which Assmann was.

In 1997, Assmann reportedly confessed his involvement in the crime to a former police officer, Matti Paloaro, and claimed responsibility for Saari's death. Assmann claimed the death was caused by an automobile accident when his car, driven by his chauffeur, collided with Saari; to conceal the evidence of the driver's involvement, the two men staged the case as a murder. According to Paloaro, Assmann said on his deathbed, "One thing however, I can tell you right away ... because it is the oldest one, and in a way it was an accident, that had to be covered up. Otherwise, our trip would have been revealed. Even though my friend was a good driver, the accident was unavoidable. I assume you know what I mean."

=== Vihtori Lehmusviita ===
Vihtori Lehmusviita was in a mental hospital for long periods, and died in 1967, following which his case was set aside. The man police generally held as a murderer was, at the time, a 38-year-old Isojoki resident living within a 1–2 km radius of the murder scene. In the 1940s, Lehmusviita was found guilty of a sexual offence and was determined to have a mental illness. The police suspected that Lehmusviita was aided in covering up the crime by a 37-year-old brother-in-law, who had a criminal background. Both Lehmusviita and his brother-in-law knew the local terrain very well, as they had a common working field located fifty meters from where Saari was found. There was a shovel in the field that was used to dig the grave.

Lehmusviita's mother and sister gave him an alibi for the evening of the murder, saying that he was in bed by 19:00 after drinking heavily. When Lehmusviita was interrogated, he said that Saari was no longer alive, and that her body would never be found. Subsequently, he withdrew his statement, claiming that he had been misunderstood. Lehmusviita and his brother-in-law were questioned in the autumn of 1953. Shortly after this incident, the brother-in-law moved to Central Ostrobothnia, and then to Sweden. Lehmusviita was questioned again while he was in a mental hospital for treatment, but his doctor halted the interview when his behaviour became strange and confused.

== See also ==
- List of solved missing person cases: 1950–1999
- List of unsolved murders (1900–1979)
  - Lake Bodom murders – unsolved Finnish triple murder case from 1960
  - Oven homicide case – unsolved Finnish murder case from 1960
  - Viking Sally murder mystery – unsolved murder case from 1987, on board the ferry MS Viking Sally
  - Ulvila murder – unsolved Finnish murder case from 2006
