= Jaajo Linnonmaa =

Finnish radio personality, actor and entrepreneur (born 1978)

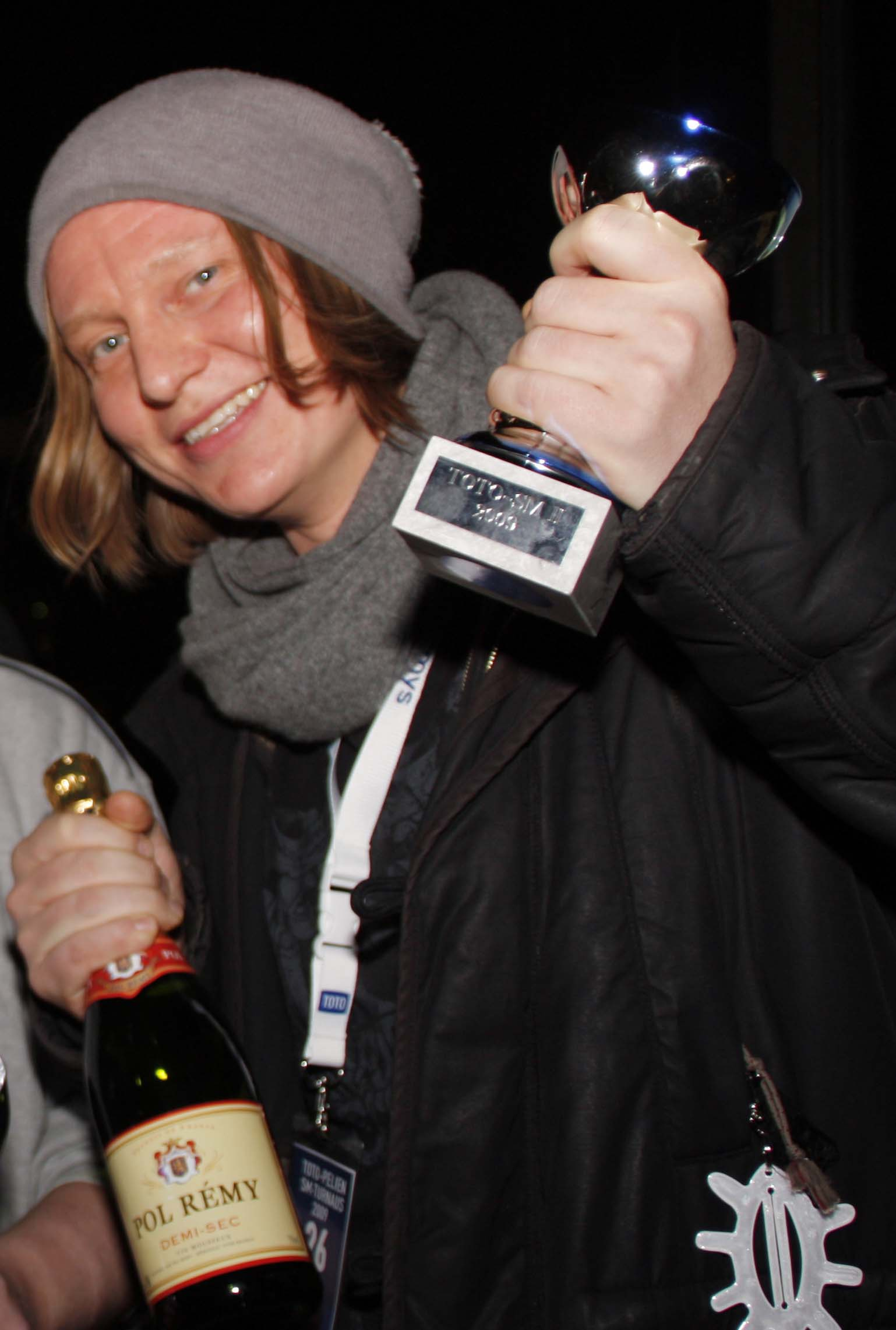
- Linnonmaa in 2009
- Born: Jari Arto Olavi Linnonmaa; 25 May 1978 (age 47); Helsinki, Finland
- Occupation(s): Actor, television personality

Jari Arto Olavi "Jaajo" Linnonmaa (born 25 May 1978 in Helsinki) is a Finnish radio personality, actor and entrepreneur. Linnonmaa hosts the breakfast show together with Anni Hautala on Radio Suomipop. The show is one of the most popular radio shows in Finland within its timeslot and the show and Linnonmaa himself have won several accolades at the Finnish Radio Gala.

In 2014, Linnonmaa made his acting debut in a small supporting role as a paramedic in the Finnish medical drama television series Syke on Yle TV2. In the same year production started on the Finnish comedy film Luokkakokous, in which Linnonmaa has a leading role, along with Aku Hirviniemi and stand-up comedian Sami Hedberg. The film was a commercial success and the sequel, Luokkakokous 2 – Polttarit, was released in 2016.

Since 2016, Linnonmaa has presented the revival of Haluatko miljonääriksi?, the Finnish version of popular game show Who Wants to Be a Millionaire?.

== Business activities ==
Linnonmaa is a business investor and entrepreneur and has invested in and runs several companies and business ventures. In 2013, he co-founded MySoda, a distributor of a consumer home carbonation products, which operates in several European countries.

== Personal life ==
Linnonmaa is married to Maija Stewart-Linnonmaa. They have four children. He is also active in horse racing.

As a child, Linnonmaa was unable to pronounce his first name "Jari", so he substituted it with "Jaajo", which he later adopted as his stage name.
