= The Renovation =

- Original Finnish film poster
- Finnish: Se mieletön remppa
- Directed by: Taneli Mustonen
- Written by: Taneli Mustonen; Aleksi Hyvärinen
- Based on: the 2018 Norwegian film Norske byggeklosser
- Produced by: Aleksi Hyvärinen; Jukka Helle; Markus Selin
- Starring: Sami Hedberg; Kiti Kokkonen
- Cinematography: Anssi Leino
- Edited by: Aleksi Raij
- Music by: Pessi Levanto
- Production companies: Solar Films; Don Films
- Distributed by: Nordisk Film
- Release date: 19 February 2020
- Running time: 90 minutes
- Country: Finland
- Language: Finnish
- Budget: EUR 1.8 million

The Renovation (Finnish: Se mieletön remppa) is a 2020 Finnish comedy film directed by Taneli Mustonen. It tells the story of a couple, Jalmari and Maija, who inherit a house in need of a major renovation, taking the situation to catastrophic proportions. Sami Hedberg and Kiti Kokkonen starred in the main roles of the film, in addition to which Hedberg portrays numerous supporting characters.

The film is a Finnish remake of the 2018 Norwegian film Norske byggeklosser, which in turn is a remake of the 1972 film of the same name. Director Taneli Mustonen says he got the idea for the film while presenting his Bodom film at the South by Southwest Film Festival in Austin, Texas, where he met Norwegians who were excited about the Norske Byggeklosser they produced. He later reached an agreement to direct the Finnish version. The house to be renovated in the film is located in Viljandi, Estonia. In addition to Estonia, the film was shot in Vihti, Finland.

The Renovation premiered on 19 February 2020. Despite poor reviews (Episodi magazine and Film-O-Holic website, for example, rated it one star out of five), the film was successful with audiences and exceeded 100,000 viewers in Finland in 11 days.

== Cast ==
- Sami Hedberg as Jalmari / Mischa / Pirkka / bank manager / waste management worker / explosive man / tractor driver
- Kiti Kokkonen as Maija
- Rea Mauranen as Oili
- Kari Ketonen as Folke
- Hannu-Pekka Björkman as construction inspector
- Inka Kallén as Teresa
- Jukka Rasila as official
- Jarmo Koski as foreman
