= Criminal investigation =

Applied science involving study of crime

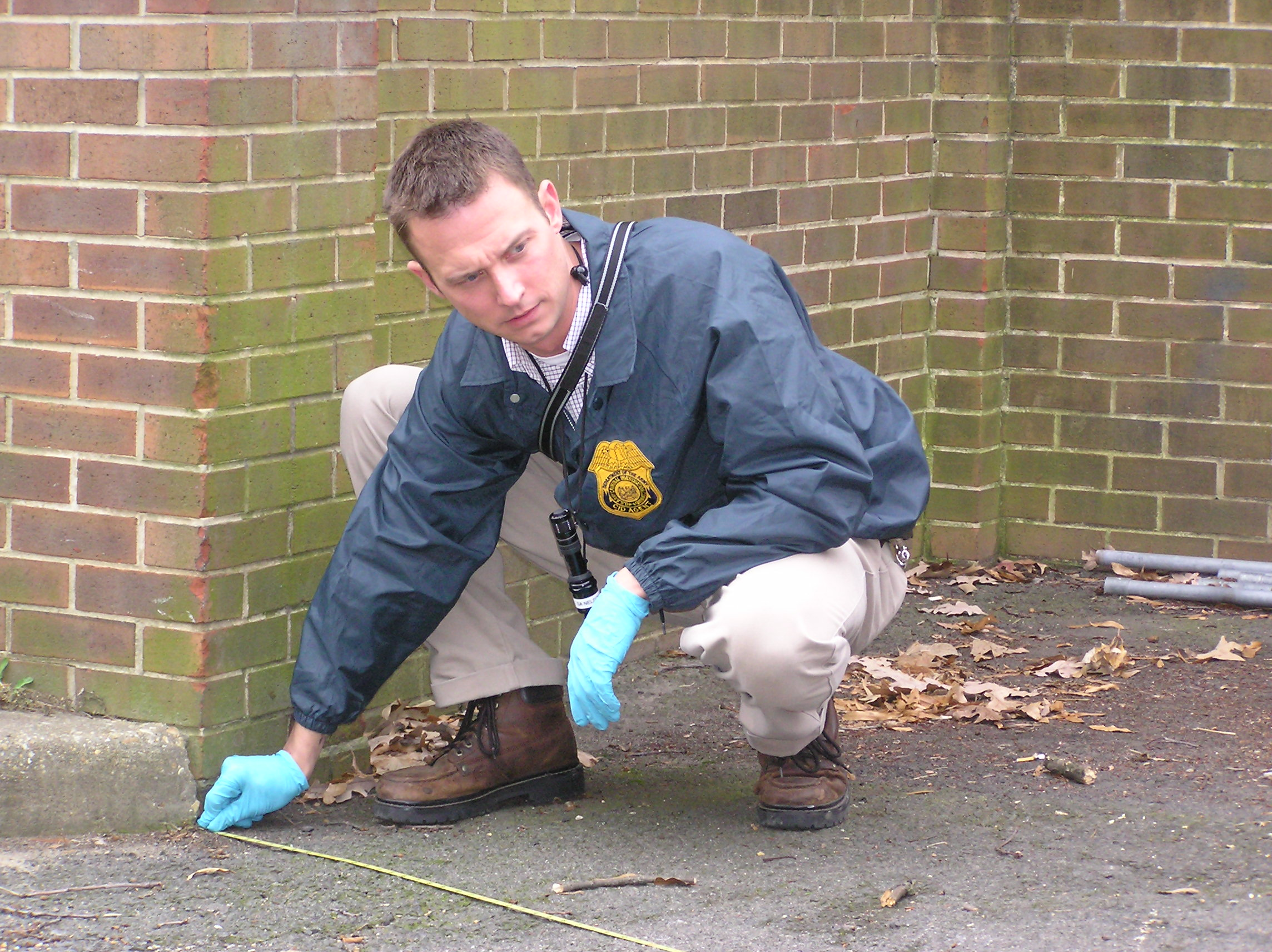
A U.S. Army Criminal Investigation Command special agent processes a crime scene on an Army installation.

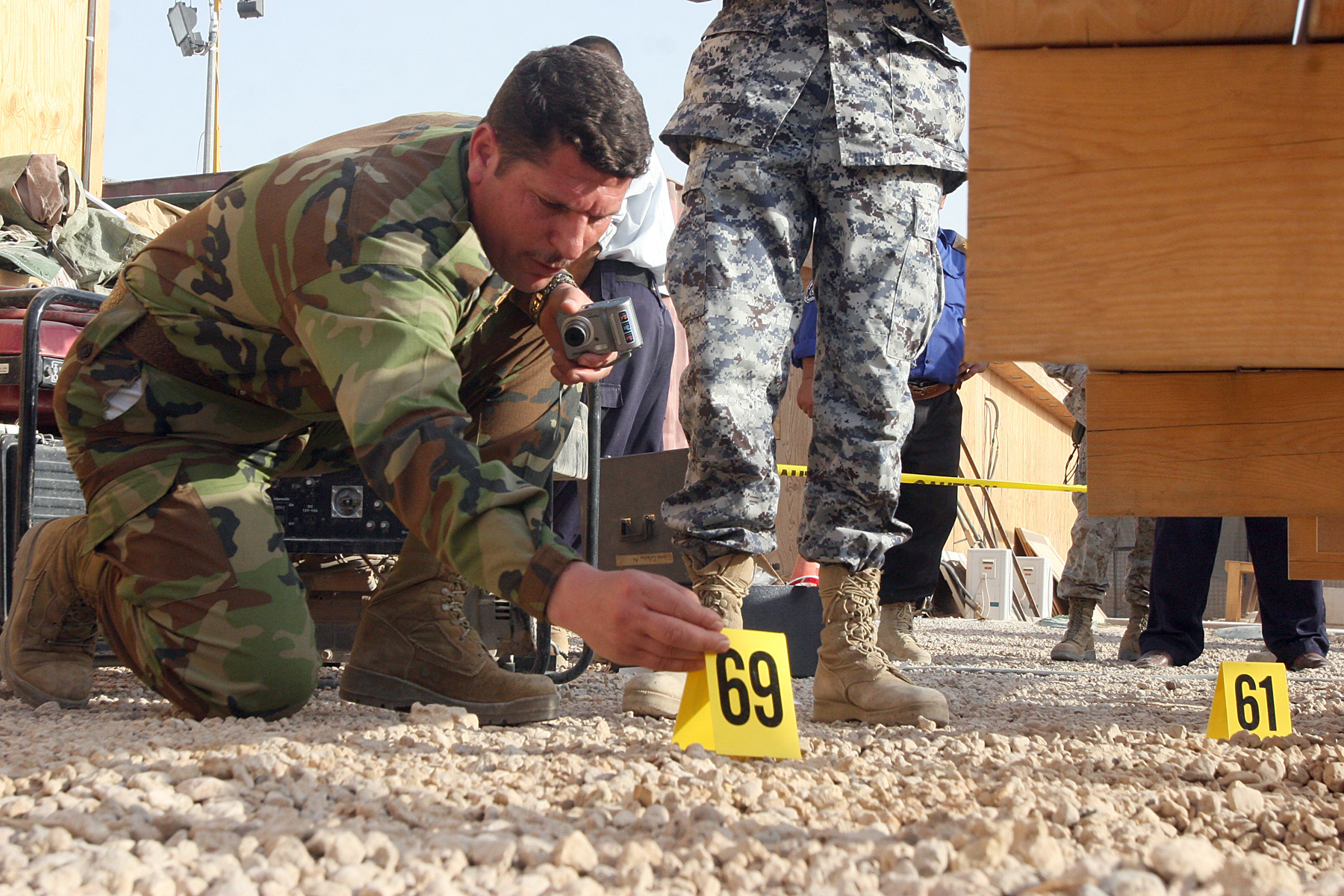
Al Asad Air Base, Iraq: An Iraqi Police officer in the Basic Criminal Investigation Course here lays down numbered tabs on a mock crime scene to mark evidence during the class' final exercise.

Criminal investigation is an applied science that involves the study of facts that are then used to inform criminal trials. A complete criminal investigation can include searching, interviews, interrogations, evidence collection and preservation, and various methods of investigation. Modern-day criminal investigations commonly employ many modern scientific techniques known collectively as forensic science.

Criminal investigation is an ancient science that may have roots as far back as 1700 BCE in the writings of the Code of Hammurabi. In the code, it is suggested that both the accuser and the accused had the right to present evidence they collected. In the modern era, criminal investigations are most often done by government police forces. Private investigators are also commonly hired to complete or assist in criminal investigations.

An early recorded professional criminal investigator was the English constable. Around 1250 CE, it was recorded that the constable was to "... record...matters of fact, not matters of judgment and law."

Use of on-site methods to investigate crimes is nicknamed 'shoe leather'.

== Investigative techniques ==
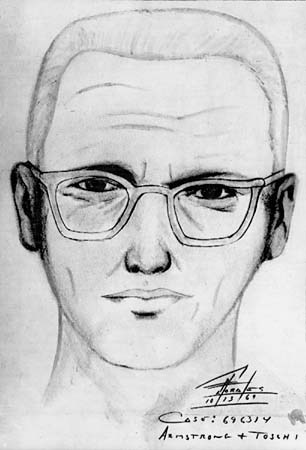
Zodiac Killer facial composite sketch, 1969, San Francisco Police Department

In determining the course of investigation, many law enforcement organizations use three "indicators of suspicion" describing potential suspects, jointly known as MMO:

- means to commit the crime (including tools and physical capabilities)
- motive to commit the crime (for example, financial gain or to seek revenge)
- opportunity to commit the crime (including being at the crime scene at the time of the offense); persons presenting an alibi can be eliminated from suspicion

They will also establish the relationships between the victim and any potential offenders.

== Investigation priority bias problems and proposed solutions ==
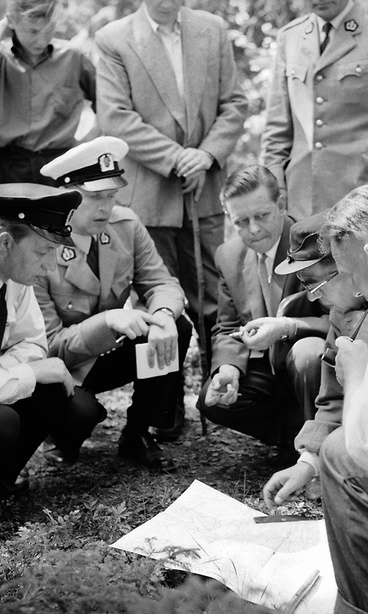
Criminal investigation at the Lake Bodom murder scene on June 6, 1960, which is still an unsolved homicide case. Deputy Judge Arvi Vainio (center) leads the investigation.

After observing recent changes in the demographic composition of particular crimes during higher priority of their investigation, such as the increase of the percentage of women convicted for joining and fighting for terrorist organizations from a very low percentage (similar to those of murder and rape) to almost as many women as men (women in the 40–50 percent range in some jurisdictions) as the priority of investigating terror crimes increased, certain criminologists are expressing the notion that there may be more crimes that would change their demographics if they got higher priority. These criminologists theorize that in the case of limited budgets, criminal investigators rely on profiled and statistical likelihood of particular groups of people being convicted for the type of crimes that are being investigated, and ignore complaints that are filed about people who they consider less likely to commit the crimes or give the tracking or individual matching to the evidence lower priority. According to the hypotheses, even a minimal or nonexistent difference in the likelihood of committing crimes can be hidden behind a difference of a factor by many multiples in the likelihood of being convicted due to self-fulfilling prophecies in the statistics. These criminologists feel that criminals who are not getting caught, due to being profiled as unlikely offenders, are a major problem. Some of these criminologists propose an increased number of police officers. Others argue that investigations of the evidence are more expensive than police patrols and that not all crimes can be investigated, suggesting that profiling of criminal psychology should be replaced with randomized priorities of individual suspects within similar types of crime. The latter criminologists also argue that such randomization would not only fight hidden crimes by exposing the currently unsuspected criminals to the risk of being punished, but also that the abolition of profiling by forensic psychology and forensic psychiatry would be a monetary saving that could be used for investigation of technical evidence, tracking of criminals who are hiding, and other investigation work that can reduce the need to ignore complaints for budget reasons.

== See also ==
- Murder book
