= Kiti Kokkonen =

Finnish actress and writer (born 1974)

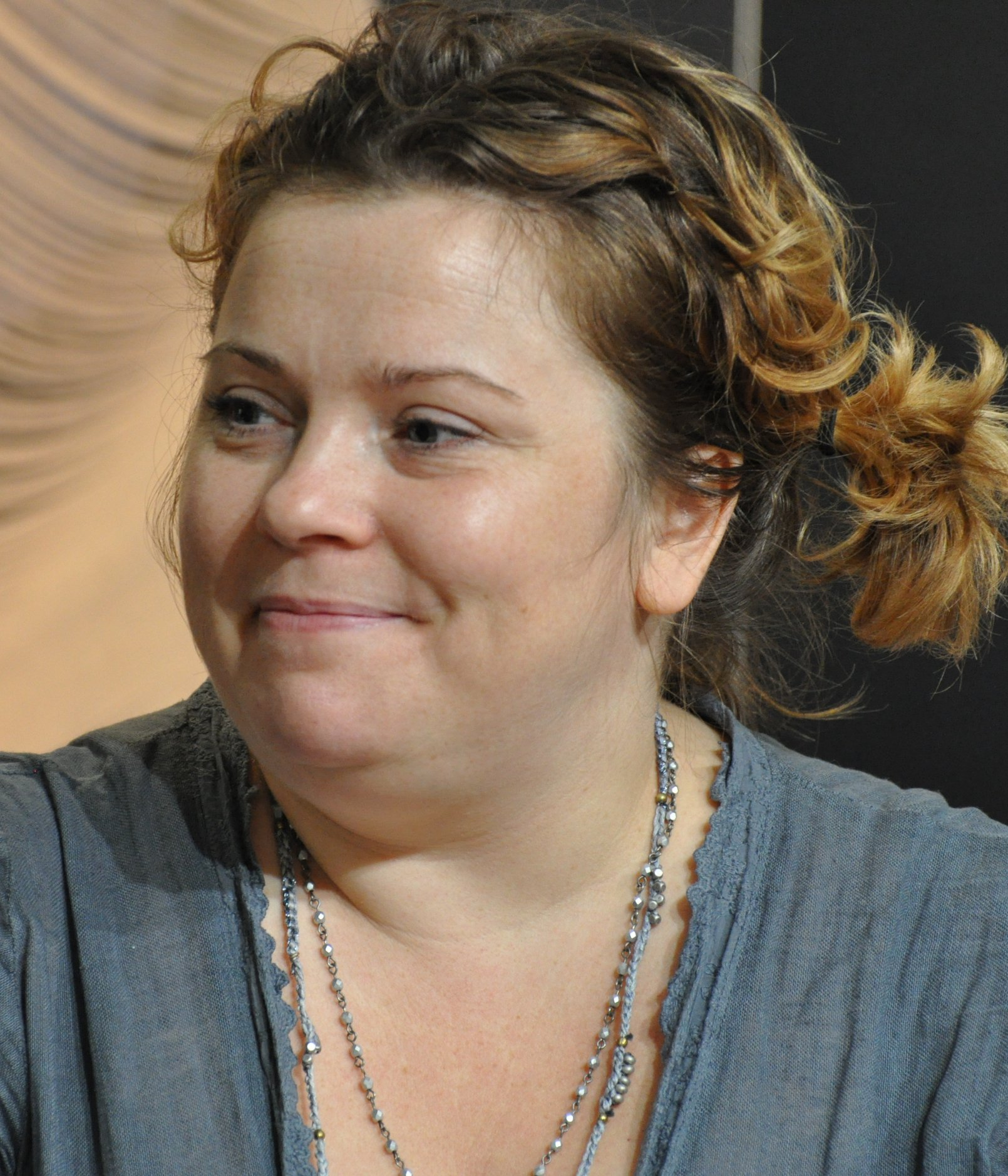
- Kiti Kokkonen at Helsinki Book Fair in 2012
- Born: 4 October 1974 (age 50); Helsinki, Finland

Kiti Karoliina Kokkonen (born 4 October 1974 in Helsinki, Finland) is a Finnish film and television actress, voice actress and writer. She has been the artistic director of Suomen Komediateatteri ("Finnish Comedy Theatre") since February 2010. She is the daughter of film director Ere Kokkonen and actress Titta Jokinen.

== Career ==
Early in her career, Kokkonen acted in Helsinki Student Theatre for a few years without any actual training in the theater industry. Since then, Kokkonen has performed in the revues of Suomen Komediateatteri, among other places. She has acted in small supporting roles in the Vääpeli Körmy and Uuno Turhapuro film series, and has made a number of voice acting roles. Kokkonen played her first lead role in the 2020 comedy film The Renovation, directed by Taneli Mustonen.

In 2018, Kokkonen starred in MTV3's sketch comedy television show Putous, where she played several small roles and her best-known Tanhupallo character. She won a playful sketch character contest with her Tanhupallo.

== Selected filmography ==
- Uuno in Spain (1985)
- Uuno Turhapuro Moves to the Country (1986)
- The Snow Queen (1986)
- A Charming Mass Suicide (2000)
- Uuno Turhapuro – This Is My Life (2004)
- The Magic Crystal (2011)
- Swingers (2018)
- The Renovation (2020)
