= Reunion 3: Singles Cruise =

- Original Finnish film poster
- Directed by: Renny Harlin
- Written by: Renny Harlin; Mari Perankoski; Aleksi Bardy
- Produced by: Jukka Helle; Markus Selin
- Starring: Sami Hedberg; Aku Hirviniemi; Jaajo Linnonmaa
- Cinematography: Matti Eerikäinen
- Edited by: Kimmo Taavila
- Music by: Juri Seppä; Tuomas Wäinölä
- Production company: Solar Films
- Distributed by: Nordisk Films
- Release date: 28 July 2021
- Running time: 104 minutes
- Country: Finland
- Language: Finnish

Reunion 3: Singles Cruise (also known as Class Reunion 3; Finnish: Luokkakokous 3 – Sinkkuristeily) is a 2021 Finnish comedy film directed by Renny Harlin. It is the third entry of the Reunion film series, and the only film in the film series that Taneli Mustonen, who directed the previous films, was not involved in making. In the film, friends Tuomas and Niklas take their mutual friend Antti, who suffers from unemployment and loneliness, on a single cruise to improve his self-esteem and mental health, with bad consequences. Like the previous film, the sequel stars Sami Hedberg, Aku Hirviniemi and Jaajo Linnonmaa.

The invitation-only guest premiere of the film was held at Bio Vuoksi in Imatra on July 23, 2021, to where it had been moved due to the COVID-19 restrictions in the Helsinki metropolitan area. The film came to a wider theatrical distribution on July 28. Like its predecessors, the film has received a negative reception from critics, with Helsingin Sanomat, Demokraatti, Hämeen Sanomat, Turun Sanomat and Katso giving the film one star out of five.

The title song of the film "Hauskaa" is performed by the band Osmo's Cosmos from Imatra.

== Cast ==
- Sami Hedberg as Antti
- Aku Hirviniemi as Niklas
- Jaajo Linnonmaa as Tuomas
- Pertti Sveholm as Akseli
- Pihla Maalismaa as Pilve
- Antti Luusuaniemi as Karno
- Ilona Chevakova as Hanne
- Kuura Rossi as Ville
- Niina Lahtinen as Jaana
- Annikki Hirviniemi as Saara
- Johanna Puhakka as Leila
- Mari Perankoski as female pig
- Jukka Puotila as Lennart
- Eino Heiskanen as Peter
