= Reunion 2: The Bachelor Party =

- Original Finnish film poster
- Directed by: Taneli Mustonen
- Written by: Taneli Mustonen
- Produced by: Jesse Fryckman; Jukka Helle; Markus Selin
- Starring: Sami Hedberg; Aku Hirviniemi; Jaajo Linnonmaa
- Cinematography: Daniel Lindholm
- Edited by: Aleksi Raij
- Production company: Solar Films
- Distributed by: Nordisk Films
- Release date: 2 November 2016
- Running time: 87 minutes
- Country: Finland
- Language: Finnish

Reunion 2: The Bachelor Party (Finnish: Luokkakokous 2 – Polttarit) is a 2016 Finnish comedy film directed by Taneli Mustonen. It is sequel to the 2015 film Reunion. This time three friends, Antti, Niklas and Tuomas, end up in a new catastrophic adventure as Niklas and Antti try to arrange for Tuomas an all-time bachelor party while they are due to go to the funeral of their old classmate. Like the previous film, the sequel is starring by Sami Hedberg, Aku Hirviniemi and Jaajo Linnonmaa.

The Bachelor Party is based on the Danish film Klassefesten 2. Its script follows mostly the same plot, but it has been adapted to suit Finnish characters in the world of film. The pre-production of the film and the post-production of Mustonen's previous film Bodom were made at the same time in 2016. The film was shot in April-May 2016, and the shooting took place in Hämeenlinna and Helsinki, among others. Like its predecessor, the film did not receive praise from critics and, in addition, attracted fewer viewers than its predecessor. Jaajo Linnonmaa believes that the reason for this was that they knew how to "play a little" and tried to bring emotion to their story.

In 2021, the film received a sequel, Reunion 3: Singles Cruise, and was directed by Renny Harlin instead of Mustonen.

== Cast ==
- Sami Hedberg as Antti
- Aku Hirviniemi as Niklas
- Jaajo Linnonmaa as Tuomas
- Kalle Lamberg as Henrik
- Anu Sinisalo as Karola
- Niina Lahtinen as Jaana
- Manuela Bosco as Malena
- Eeva Litmanen as Birgit
- Helena Vierikko as Leila
- Saija Lentonen as librarian
- Mika Suutari as gang leader
