= The Reunion (2011 Danish film) =

2011 film

- Film poster
- Directed by: Niels Nørløv
- Written by: Claudia Boderke; Lars Mering
- Produced by: Rene Ezra; Tomas Radoor
- Starring: Nicolaj Kopernikus; Troels Lyby; Anders W. Berthelsen
- Cinematography: Rasmus Arrildt
- Distributed by: Nordisk Film
- Release date: 13 October 2011
- Running time: 90 minutes
- Country: Denmark
- Language: Danish

The Reunion (Danish: Klassefesten) is a 2011 Danish comedy film directed by Niels Nørløv. A Finnish remake of the film, Reunion (Luokkakokous), was released in 2015.

== Cast ==
- Nicolaj Kopernikus as Niels
- Anders W. Berthelsen as Andreas
- Troels Lyby as Thomas
- Therese Glahn as Hanne
- Camilla Søeberg as Jette
- Mira Wanting as Simone
- Lene Nystrøm as Eva
- Troels Malling Thaarup as Ole (as Troels Malling)
- Brian Lykke as Tom
- Mia Nielsen-Jexen as Sanne (as Mia Jexen)
- Signe Skov as Lærke
- Søren Bregendal as Carsten

== Sequels and Remakes ==
The film had two sequels: Klassefesten 2 - Begravelsen and Klassefesten 3: Dåben.

The trilogy was adapted in:

- Finland: Luokkakokous, Luokkakokous 2 – Polttarit and Luokkakokous 3 – Sinkkuristeily.
- Estonia: Klassikokkutulek, Klassikokkutulek 2: Pulmad ja matused and Klassikokkutulek 3: Ristiisad.
- Germany: Klassentreffen 1.0 and The Wedding. There was no remake of the third film.
