= Red Caps (TV series) =

- Genre: Fantasy, animation
- Country of origin: Finland, Italy
- Original languages: Finnish, Italian
- No. of seasons: 1
- No. of episodes: 26

Production
- Production companies: Cartoon-One, Epidem ZOT

Original release
- Network: Nelonen (Finland), YLE FST5 (Finland), Rai Gulp (Italy)
- Release: 29 September 2011 (YLE FST5); 18 November 2011 (Nelonen); 11 December 2011 (Rai Gulp)

Red Caps (Finnish: Tonttupartio Red Caps) is a Finnish-Italian animated television series. It was produced by Finnish company Epidem ZOT and Italian company Cartoon-One in 2011. The series focuses on the adventures of a group of elves, and it is characterized by educational and moral purposes which gained to it the support of a number of institutions, including UNICEF and the Finnish Ministry of Environment.

On 29 September 2011, Red Caps began airing in Finland in Swedish on YLE FST5 and, on 18 November 2011, in Finnish on Nelonen. On 11 December 2011, it began airing in Italy on Rai Gulp.

A film based on the series, titled Santa's Magic Crystal, was distributed in 2011 in 3D. In the English-language version, Joe Carey played Santa Claus, Kyle E. Christensen as Yotan and David Dreisen as Grouch.

== Plot ==
It has become impossible for Santa Claus to personally answer all the children's cries for help from all over the world. So Santa has gathered all his best tomties around him and founded the Red Caps Task Force, versus Santa's evil brother Basil with his assistants Grouch and robotics.
