= Mira Wanting =

Danish actress (1978–2012)

- Born: Mira Herfort Wanting; 19 April 1978; Denmark
- Died: 22 December 2012 (aged 34); Copenhagen, Denmark
- Occupation: Actress
- Years active: 1988–2011
- Children: Alberte; Filippa

Mira Herfort Wanting (19 April 1978 – 22 December 2012) was a Danish actress. She appeared in TV3's series Hvide løgne in 1998, and played Gitte in Anja and Viktor (2001) and its three sequels. She died on 22 December 2012 as a result of cervical cancer.

== Filmography ==
=== Film ===
År	Film	Rolle	Andre noter
1988	Næste sommer måske - ingen vej tilbage	Line	TV film
1991	Superdame	Datter	Danske Spil tv-produktion
1996	Fridas første gang	Frida	Featurette
1997	Det store flip	Julie, Christoffers kæreste	Birolle
1998	Surferne kommer	Anne	Ungdomsfilm
1999	Kærlighed ved første hik	Gitte	
1999	Din for altid	Mette	39 minutter short film
2000	Her i nærheden	Pige i skoven	Mindre rolle
2001	Anja og Viktor - Kærlighed ved første hik 2	Gitte	
2002	Perker	Sanne	
2002	L'Auberge espagnole	Mira	Fransk film
2002	John og Mia	Mia	25 minutter lang kortfilm
2003	Anja efter Viktor	Gitte	
2003	Regel nr. 1	Sarah	
2005	Solkongen	Stine	Mindre rolle
2005	Sommerfuglekvinden	Young Elisabeth	30 minutter lang kortfilm
2007	Anja og Viktor - Brændende kærlighed	Gitte	
2007	Kollegiet	Lena	
2008	Blå mænd	Dion's kone	
2008	Anja og Viktor - i medgang og modgang	Gitte	
2010	Karla og Jonas	Nanna - Jonas' mor	
2011	Klassefesten	Simone	Last film appearance

=== Television ===
Serie	År	Rolle
Hvide løgne	1998–2001	Anette Madsen
TAXA	1999 (afsnit 54)	Kunde
Hotellet	2002 (afsnit 53)	Kira
Plan B	2002 (afsnit 2, 6)	Tina, Kim's kæreste
Øen	2007	Helene
Maj & Charlie	2008	Laura - Majs barndomsveninde
