= Oittaa =

Coordinates: 60°14′18.72″N 24°39′21.22″E

- District
- Interactive map of Oittaa
- Country: Finland
- Municipality: Espoo

Oittaa is a district in Espoo, Finland, located on the southern shore of Lake Bodom. There is a popular public beach and plenty of services for outdoor recreation.
