= Swingers (2018 film) =

- Directed by: Pamela Tola
- Written by: Mikkel Munch-Fals; Niina Lahtinen; Pamela Tola
- Based on: Swinger by Mikkel Munch-Fals
- Produced by: Jesse Fryckman
- Cinematography: Jan Nyman
- Edited by: Antti Reikko
- Music by: Pessi Levanto
- Production companies: Bronson Club; Hihhihhii
- Distributed by: SF Studios
- Release date: 30 November 2018
- Running time: 86 minutes
- Country: Finland
- Language: Finnish

Swingers is a 2018 Finnish comedy film directed by Pamela Tola. It is a remake of the 2016 Danish film Swinger. The film premiered on November 30, 2018. It follows a swingers' weekend involving four couples of different ages.

== Plot ==
Four couples arrive at a countryside mansion for a weekend centred on sexual encounters. The mansion has a secret cellar where guests are expected to engage in sexual activities without developing romantic feelings or jealousy. The dress code is a bathrobe or no clothing.

Each couple has their own reasons for attending. One pair are seasoned swingers who know the rules, but the rest are first-timers, each struggling with relationship issues. Ari (Aku Hirviniemi) and Laura (Marja Salo) find their fragile marriage unraveling the moment they set foot on the estate, with Ari’s midlife crisis dragging him deeper into chaos. Veera (Kiti Kokkonen) and Jani (Janne Kataja) wrestle with the question of having a child, while the youngest female participant is there for a completely different reason—she’s conducting research for her studies.

As the weekend unfolds, the couples are forced to confront not only each other but also their deepest insecurities and find out whether swinging can really save a relationship, or does it simply expose the cracks that were already there.

== Cast ==
- Aku Hirviniemi as Ari
- Janne Kataja as Jani
- Kiti Kokkonen as Veera
- Matleena Kuusniemi as Inka
- Mikko Nousiainen as Esko
- Roope Salminen as Jere
- Marja Salo as Laura
- Mimosa Willamo as Milla
- Miitta Sorvali as Ritva
- Tommi Liski as Eero
