= Reunion (2015 film) =

Finnish comedy film

- Original Finnish film poster
- Finnish: Luokkakokous
- Directed by: Taneli Mustonen
- Written by: Taneli Mustonen
- Based on: Klassefesten by Lars Mering and Claudia Boderke
- Produced by: Jesse Fryckman; Oskari Huttu; Jukka Helle; Markus Selin
- Starring: Sami Hedberg; Aku Hirviniemi; Jaajo Linnonmaa
- Cinematography: Daniel Lindholm
- Edited by: Aleksi Raij
- Production company: Solar Films
- Distributed by: Nordisk Films
- Release date: 25 February 2015
- Running time: 92 minutes
- Country: Finland
- Language: Finnish
- Budget: EUR 1.2 million

Reunion (Finnish: Luokkakokous) is a 2015 Finnish comedy film directed by Taneli Mustonen. It's the story of three men, Antti, Niklas and Tuomas, traveling back to their old hometown to attend a high school class party, with the goal of realizing a wild weekend of freedom and fun. The film is starring by Sami Hedberg, Aku Hirviniemi and Jaajo Linnonmaa. The film is a Finnish remake of the 2011 Danish comedy film Klassefesten.

Reunion premiered on 25 February 2015. The film received a very negative reception from critics, and it has even been called the "worst Finnish film of 2015". Despite the criticism, the film received more than 500,000 viewers in the Finnish movie theaters. It was chosen as the audience's favorite film at the 2016 Jussi Awards.

In 2016, the film received a sequel, Reunion 2: The Bachelor Party, which was also directed by Taneli Mustonen. A second sequel to the film, Reunion 3: Singles Cruise, appeared in 2021, and was directed by Renny Harlin instead of Mustonen.

== Cast ==
- Sami Hedberg as Antti
- Aku Hirviniemi as Niklas
- Jaajo Linnonmaa as Tuomas
- Niina Lahtinen as Jaana
- Helena Vierikko as Leila
- Lotta Kaihua as Hanne
- Lauri Tilkanen as Karno
- Inka Kallén as Reetta
- Taneli Mäkelä as father-in-law / doctor #1
- Pirkka-Pekka Petelius as doctor #2
- Maria Sid as receptionist
- Satu Silvo as nurse
