= The Magic Crystal (2011 film) =

2011 animated Christmas film

- Finnish theatrical release poster
- Finnish: Maaginen kristalli
- Directed by: Antti Haikala
- Screenplay by: Antti Haikala; Bob Swain; Dan Wicksman; Nuria Wicksman; Alessandro Liggieri
- Music by: Menno Van Riet
- Production companies: Epidem ZOT; Aranéo Belgium; Skyline Animation
- Distributed by: Future Film (Finland); TF1 Enterprises (international); Atlas International Film (worldwide sales)
- Release dates: November 2, 2011 (Belgium); November 18, 2011 (Finland)
- Running time: 75 minutes
- Countries: Finland; Belgium
- Language: Finnish
- Budget: €5,074,000 ($6,001,019.8)
- Box office: €340,836

The Magic Crystal (Finnish: Maaginen kristalli), also released as Santa's Magic Crystal and The Elf that Rescued Christmas in the UK, is a 2011 computer-animated Christmas film directed by Antti Haikala from a screenplay by Haikala, Bob Swain, Dan Wicksman, Nuria Wicksman and Alessandro Liggieri. The film is part of a unified multimedia concept developed by Mikael Wahlfors, which also includes Andrew Bernhardt's Special Patrol children's books, the Italian-produced animated series Red Caps, and the mobile app World Polar Heroes. The Magic Crystal was produced by the Epidem ZOT, Aranéo and Skyline Animation.

It was released in Belgium on November 2, 2011 and on 18 of the same month in Finland; the film was a box office bomb, grossing $340,836 against a budget of €5,074,000 ($6,001,019.8).

== Plot ==
On December 23, a young orphan named Yotan (Jonas in some versions) is late to return to the orphanage due to him helping a younger boy retrieve his Christmas letter in a drain. In his room, Santa's twin brother Basil and his minion Grouch (Lätty in some versions) show up outside his window asking if he would like to help save Christmas. The orphanage owner bursts into the room scaring Yotan out of the window and into the garbage bin. In the bin, Yotan befriends a female talking squirrel named Jiffy. Santa's rocket-powered sleigh shows up driven by a Jamaican anthropomorphic reindeer named Poro who picks up Basil and Grouch. The bin rolls down the hill and the orphanage owner tells Yotan to never come back. Yotan and Jiffy crash into the town centre where the sleigh returns to collect the letters and the two hide in one of the letter bags. Basil and Grouch notice them and help Poro with the bags and they take off back to Lapland.

In Lapland, the sleigh arrives at Santa's palace. Yotan and Jiffy sneak out before Basil finds them and they run around the palace narrowly avoiding Basil. Basil eventually finds them and takes them to the crystal room where a magical crystal is being kept. He explains that Santa is two minutes older than him and says that Christmas isn't what it's supposed to be. He then makes Yotan retrieve the crystal and with Jiffy's help is able to get it. Basil then betrays Yotan when he takes the crystal from him and leaves him behind. A group of elves and Poro arrive in the crystal room to find Yotan and Jiffy and the crystal missing. An elf named Jaga accuses Yotan of stealing the crystal. Santa Claus (credited as Joulupukki in original version) and his wife Maya arrive and react more calmly to Yotan's presence. Basil calls from the control room revealing he stole the crystal. Jaga and another elf named Didi chase after Basil on rocket-powered skis but are shot down by Basil's Robotics (minion-like robots). Yotan hijacks the sleigh with the help of a younger elf named Alpo who only speaks in Elvish. Poro grabs on to the sleigh and it blasts out of the palace. Yotan earns Poro's trust after he saves him. Santa reveals that the reason Basil needed Yotan was because he is at the top of the nice list making him the nicest person in the world and earlier put a magic star in Yotan's pocket and tells him that when the time comes it will do exactly what he needs it to do and to believe in himself. At Basil's base, he steals Jaga and Didi's magic stars and forces them to activate them in order for his base to start working. He then freezes the palace and imprisons them.

As the sleigh closes in on the base, Basil flies out on another sleigh and shoots it down. Basil explains to Jaga and Didi that he plans to kidnap all the children in the world due to bad things they do when they grow up (wars, pollution, crimes, etc.) and that Santa spoils them. Surviving the crash, Poro fix the sleigh and Alpo distracts the Robotics. Making their way into the base, Yotan and Jiffy find out that the Robotics are strange green beings in robot suits. Disguising as one of them, Yotan finds portions of Basil's plan but before he can move on, his cover is blown and is imprisoned by Basil who steals his star. Jiffy escapes and accidentally falls off the base which causes a giant snowball to destroy the sleigh just as Poro finishes fixing it. They crash into the base and Yotan's cell, freeing him. Unbeknownst to them, Basil witnessed the escape.

Back at the palace, Santa, Maya and the elves are revealed to have survived being frozen from the blast and with the radio down, Smoo, a gifted elf, attempts to fix a drone to find the group. The group retrieve Jaga and Didi's stars but Basil appears and after a fight, chases him to where Jaga and Didi are where Basil reveals that the base is built under a volcano and attempts to burn them in the lava. Yotan throws them their stars allowing them to escape as does Basil and Grouch. Chasing after them, the base starts to rise. Jaga still doesn't trust Yotan who runs off with Jiffy to stop Basil himself after she said that he's not one of them. Yotan attempts to stop Basil but is then joined by the others, including Jaga, finally accepting him. Yotan throws Jiffy at Basil who retrieves his star. The volcano starts to erupt due to the power of the crystal trapping Poro and the elves. Basil pushes Yotan into the lava but uses the orphanage owner's cane to hold himself. He retrieves his star and it gives him anti-gravity powers which he uses to save the others. The crystal is revealed, when the Christmas star rises, to multiply Santa for each country so he can deliver the presents. Yotan asks the Basils "Which one of you is the real Santa Claus?" This causes a fight between the Basils giving Yotan and Jaga a chance to save the crystal, but is saved by Grouch who they take with him. Due to the crystal being taken, the Basils regroup causing Basil to be launched out of Lapland and into a house where he is toppled by children.

In Basil's sleigh, it is too heavy for all of them so Jaga attempts to sacrifice herself but Yotan attempts to save her causing them both to fall off. The sleigh escapes but the drone saves Yotan and Jaga and the green creatures from the Robotic suits escape from the base. Back at the palace, Yotan, Jiffy, Jaga, Didi, Alpo and Smoo are named Santa's special helpers: the Red Caps. The crystal multiplies Santa and Poro who go off to deliver the presents and spread Christmas joy to the world and Yotan is given his wish he made earlier: being part of a family.

== Cast ==
- Jukka Nylund as Yotan/Jonas
  - Kyle E. Christensen as Yotan/Jonas (English dub)
- Paula Vesala as Jaga
  - Clarissa Humm as Jaga (English dub)
- Kiti Kokkonen as Jiffy
  - Lisa Kent as Jiffy (English dub)
- Veeti Kallio as Basil
  - Gerald Owens as Basil (English dub)
- Antti Jaakola as Grouch/Lätty
  - David Dreisen as Grouch/Lätty (English dub)
- Henni-Liisa Stam as Didi
  - CJ Fam as Didi (English dub)
- Jon-Jon Geitel as Smoo
  - Michael Mena as Smoo (English dub)
- Aapo Haikala as Alpo
  - Mathew Wetcher as Alpo (English dub)
- Veikko Honkanen as Santa/Joulupukki
  - Joe Carey as Santa/Joulupukki (English dub)

== Release ==
The Magic Crystal was released in Finnish cinemas on 18 November 2011 by Future Film.

=== Box office performance ===
The Magic Crystal was a box office bomb. It received 5,000 admissions during its opening weekend, ending with 16,865 during its entire theatrical run, which equates to $195,599 according to Box Office Mojo. In Belgium, it grossed $74,096. The film was later released in Lebanon on 13 December 2012, where it grossed $71,141 for a worldwide total box office gross of €340,836 against a budget of €5,074,000 ($6,001,019.8). It was the 86th most-watched film in Finland of 2011 by number of admissions. According to Peter Toiviainen, manager of marketing at Future Film, the reason for the film's underperformance at the box office was because "the novelty value of domestic 3D films is now lower than it was two years ago", and competition from The Twilight Saga: Breaking Dawn – Part 1, which premiered at the same time as The Magic Crystal.

== Reception ==
Common Sense Media gave the film 3 out of 5 stars and the disclaimer: "Finnish Christmas adventure has some cartoonish violence".

Päivi Laajalahti gave the film three out of five stars. In his review he criticized visual effects and the script, but praised voice acting and considered dialogues smart.

== See also ==
- The Flight Before Christmas (2008 film)
