= Comedian and 7 Wonders =

Finnish travel television series

- Genre: Comedy, travel
- Starring: Aku Hirviniemi
- Country of origin: Finland
- No. of seasons: 2

Production
- Production company: Rabbit Films

Original release
- Network: MTV3 Finland

Comedian and 7 Wonders (original title: Aku ja 7 ihmettä) is a Finnish entertainment travel program. It is hosted by comedian Aku Hirviniemi, and it aired on MTV3. The program introduces the new Seven Wonders of the World. In the first season, Hirviniemi's sites include Iguazu Falls, the city of Petra, the Taj Mahal, Christ the Redeemer statue in Rio de Janeiro, Ha Long Bay, Machu Picchu and the Great Wall of China. In the second season, the host travels to seven interesting cities around the world. Hirviniemi's travel list included for example Reykjavik, Bangkok, Tokyo. The first season started in October 2014 and the second season started in October 2016.
