= Aku Hirviniemi =

Finnish actor (born 1983)

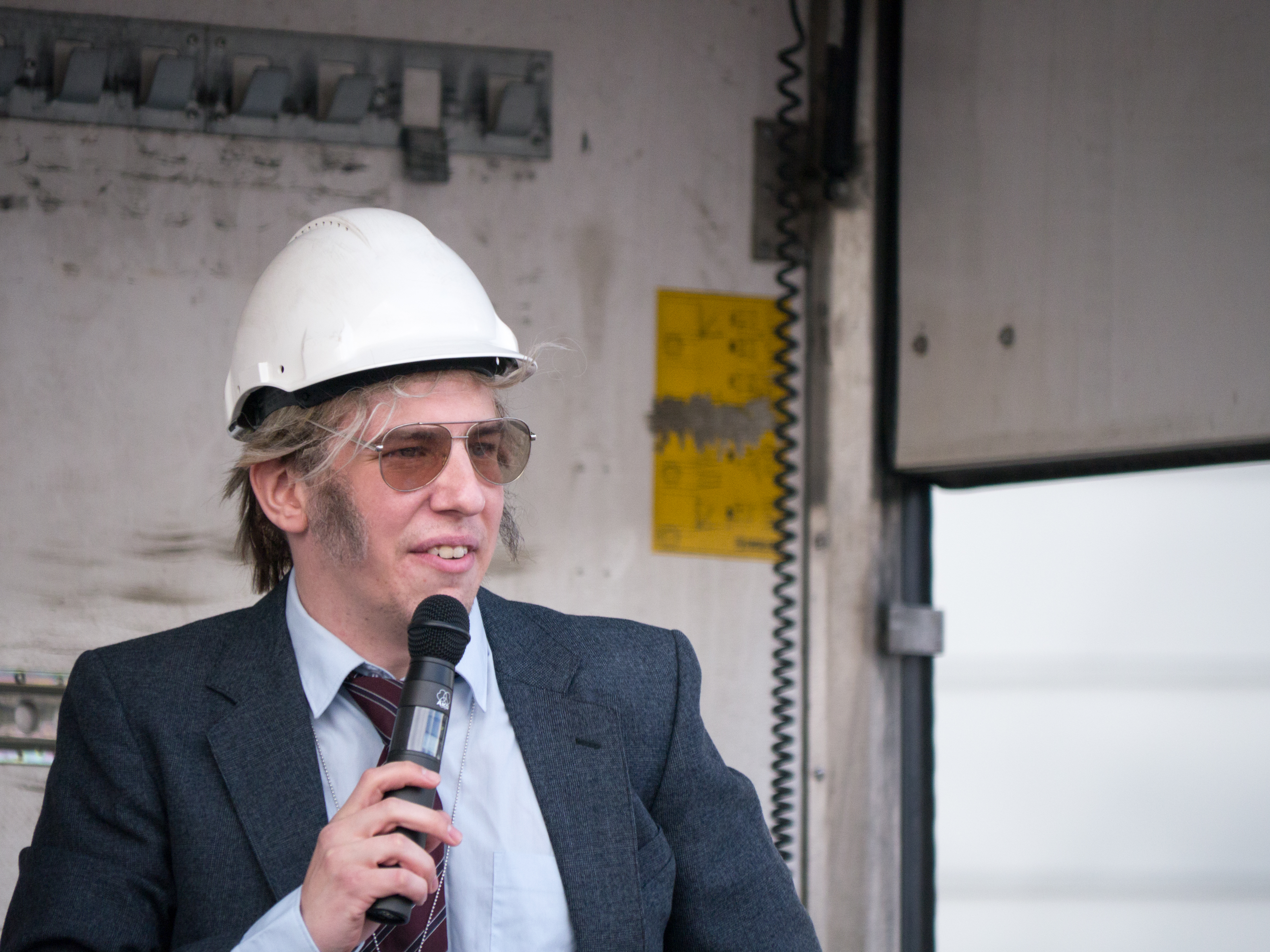
Hirviniemi performing in 2011

Aku-Heikki Ilmari Hirviniemi (born 5 December 1983, in Riihimäki) is a Finnish actor. He is well-known for his role as Urho Hietanen in the 2017 war film The Unknown Soldier.

== Theatre and television ==
Hirviniemi has worked for several theatres around Finland, including Helsinki, Riihimäki, Jyväskylä, Lahti and Hämeenlinna, while also acting in films and on television. He first gained popularity in a television series Presidentin kanslia (2008–2011) in which he played the chauffeur Illu Airisto.

In the spring of 2010, Hirviniemi became a household name in Finland when a weekly sketch comedy television show Putous premiered. In the first season, his female character Marja Tyrni was crowned as the "sketch comedy character of the year". He was part of the cast in the first five seasons of the show, but announced on 1 March 2014 that he would not return for season six. From 2012 to 2016 Hirviniemi starred MTV3's police drama series Roba.

In 2014 Hirviniemi and another former Putous actor Jaakko Saariluoma hosted a comedy talk show Posse with The Dudesons.

== Personal life ==
Aku Hirviniemi's father is Rauli Hirviniemi, a logistics chief, and his mother is Erja Hirviniemi, a nurse. They have been members of the Riihimäki city council from the Left Alliance party. Aku Hirviniemi's sister is Aino-Kaisa Pekonen, a member of the Parliament of Finland and former Minister of Social Affairs and Health. Aku Hirviniemi himself is not interested in politics, although he has been a member of the youth division of the Left Alliance in his youth.

Hirviniemi has two daughters from his 18-year relationship with actress Niina Lahtinen. The couple divorced in 2016. Since 2018, Hirviniemi has been dating the TV show host Sonja Kailassaari and they got engaged on 2 February 2020. The couple had their first child in July 2023.

=== Sexual harassment trial ===
Hirviniemi has been accused of two counts of sexual harassment, which had been said to have happened on 30 June 2018 in Riihimäki. Hirviniemi had invited two 17-year-old girls to his home and had touched them from underneath their shirts at the lower back and the bottom. One of the girls called the emergency number, and a police patrol arrived at the scene. The district court of Tavastia Proper started investigating the matter on 17 May 2019. The district court rejected the charges against Hirviniemi on 7 June. According to the court decision, the acts did not go against the sexual self-governance rights of the girls and did not count as sexual harassment. According to the district court it was obvious that the girls had at least somewhat reacted to Hirviniemi's behaviour in a stronger way than usual. Neither of the girls had demanded punishment for Hirviniemi or compensation for themselves. The prosecutor had complained to the Court of Appeals about the matter. The Turku Court of Appeals overturned the district court's decision on 4 December 2020 and saw that Hirviniemi was guilty of the charges but did not sentence him to punishment because of the lesser nature of the acts.

=== Sexual harassment charges in 2023 ===
Hirviniemi had sent sexually loaded text messages, pictures and videos to several famous women and to his co-workers. Some of the respondents had found the messages to be sexually harassing. Hirviniemi admitted to the deed in November 2023 and made a public apology on his Instagram account to the women and to his fiancée. He has said he has also sought professional help for his problem.

Because of this controversy, Hirviniemi resigned from his post at the board of the production company Hihhihhii Oy in November. The Helsinki City Theatre fired Hirviniemi from the play Ilmaista rahaa which is to premier in February 2024. Later in the same month there was news that Hirviniemi had acted unprofessionally at the shooting of the Finnish version of the TV series I'm a Celebrity...Get Me Out of Here! in 2021. There was also news that Hirviniemi had approached some of the employees of the TV series in a sexually oriented way, including both Finns and local Argentinians.

== Selected filmography ==
=== Films ===
- Pohjaväri (2006)
- Tali-Ihantala 1944 (2007)
- The Storage (2011)
- Risto (2011)
- Kotirauha (2011)
- Herra Heinämäki ja Leijonatuuliviiri (2011)
- Härmä (2012)
- 21 tapaa pilata avioliitto (2013)
- August Fools (2013)
- Reunion (2015)
- Reunion 2: The Bachelor Party (2016)
- The Unknown Soldier (2017)
- Swingers (2018)
- Reunion 3: Singles Cruise (2021)
- Kikka! (2022)

=== Television ===
- Tasavallan presidentti (2007)
- Presidentin kanslia (2008–2011)
- Ihmebantu (2009)
- Putous (2010–2014)
- Vedetään hatusta (2010)
- Virta (2011)
- Klikkaa mua (2011)
- Roba (2012–2016)
- Harjakaisen & Piisisen talkoot (2012)
- Taivaan tulet (2013)
- Posse (2014)
- Kingi (2015)
- Comedian and 7 Wonders (2015–2016)
- Saturday Night Live (Finnish version) (2016)

== Discography ==
=== Albums ===
- Marja Tyrni – Tortturalli (2010)
- Marja Tyrni – Joulun kulkuset (2010)
- Aku Hirviniemi – Hahmo Shake (2013)

=== Singles ===
- Marja Tyrni – "Suut makiaks!" (2010)
- Marja Tyrni – "Eikan kulkuset" (2010)
- Marja Tyrni featuring Mikko Kuustonen & Nenäpäivä Ensemble – "Leivotaan, leivotaan" (2010)
- Samppa Linna – "Samppa Linna Shake" (2013)
- Samppa Linna featuring Timo Jutila – "Ny rillataan viimeiseen asti" (2013)

== Books ==
- Suut makiaksi Marja Tyrnin tapaan (Helsinki-kirjat 2010)
