= Taneli Mustonen =

Finnish film director and screenwriter

- Born: 1 January 1978; Joensuu, Finland
- Occupations: Film director, screenwriter
- Years active: 2012–
- Known for: Reunion; Lake Bodom

Taneli Mustonen (born 1 January 1978) is a Finnish film director and screenwriter. He is best known for his 2015 comedy film Reunion (Luokkakokous), which is based on the 2011 Danish film Klassefesten, but internationally, he became known for the 2016 Finnish slasher film Lake Bodom.

== Biography ==
When Mustonen was a child, his parents bought a movie theater in Outokumpu. Mustonen's film philosophy is based on this childhood experience, as he strives to make films exclusively for the general public. At the age of 20, Mustonen made his first attempt to study film directing at the Aalto University School of Arts, Design and Architecture.

In 2015, Mustonen was included in the list of Variety's ten most promising Nordic directors. Although Mustonen has not received any recognition from Finnish critics, the films have earned well in terms of box office revenue and have been very popular with the audience.

== Filmography ==
- Ella and Friends (Ella ja kaverit, 2012)
- Reunion (Luokkakokous, 2015)
- Lake Bodom (Bodom, 2016)
- Reunion 2: The Bachelor Party (Luokkakokous 2 – Polttarit, 2016)
- The Renovation (Se mieletön remppa, 2020)
- The Twin (The Twin – Paha kaksonen, 2022)
- The Bayou (2025)
