= Bodom (film) =

2016 Finnish horror film

- Theatrical poster
- Directed by: Taneli Mustonen
- Written by: Taneli Mustonen; Aleksi Hyvärinen
- Starring: Mimosa Willamo; Nelly Hirst-Gee; Santeri Helinheimo Mäntylä; Mikael Gabriel
- Cinematography: Daniel Lindholm
- Edited by: Aleksi Raij
- Music by: Panu Aaltio
- Production company: Don Films
- Release date: 19 August 2016
- Running time: 85 minutes
- Country: Finland
- Languages: Finnish, English

Bodom (internationally Lake Bodom) is a 2016 Finnish slasher film directed by Taneli Mustonen. It is inspired by, but not based upon, the 1960 Lake Bodom murders, telling the story of a group of Finnish friends who decide to go camping by Lake Bodom to reconstruct the 1960 murders, but something goes wrong.

Bodom was invited to Cannes for an event organized by the Marché du Film, for which the films were chosen by a joint jury of the organizers of the event (the Cannes Film Market and the Canadian Frontières Film Event).

== Plot ==
A group of friends, Nora, Elias, Atte and Ida, go to Lake Bodom to camp and reconstruct the 1960 murders there. Ida has been ostracized at school because of nude pictures taken of her. She is fascinated with Elias, because he is accused of taking the pictures.

At night at Bodom, with Ida and Atte in the tent, someone grabs them through the tent. Atte goes out, and a mysterious figure stabs him. Nora and Elias run to the scene, but too late. The dying Atte tells them to escape before the killer returns to the tent.

The trio tries to reach the car, but Nora's leg gives out, and she tells Elias and Ida to continue without her. Elias tries to explain to the angry Ida that he has never taken any nude pictures of her. At that moment, a mysterious figure stabs Elias from behind, killing him. Nora, who has plotted with Ida to kill Elias and Atte, who ruined Ida's life, is revealed as the killer. The girls put on protective clothing and throw the boys' bodies into Lake Bodom. The girls plan to escape with their car, but realize that the car keys are in Elias' pocket. Ida desperately dives into the lake to pick up the keys, and Nora can see movement in the woods near the lake.

Ida, on the car ride home, asks Nora if the nude photos really exist. Nora breaks down and reveals that she is in love with Ida, and could not bear to tell her. It is revealed that at a student party, Ida passed out from drinking, and Nora took her to bed to sleep. After that, Nora began to spread rumors of Ida’s nude pictures, which actually didn’t exist. Nora lied to Ida that Elias had taken the pictures. Ida hoped Elias and Atte would die, at which point the duo began planning a boys' killing trip. Ida is shocked to hear the truth and threatens to tell everything, with Nora hitting her in the face with a wrench. Ida gets angry and attacks Nora, who is driving the car. The girls drive into a ditch.

An unknown man offers to help the girls and tow them to town. Nora asks Ida for the knife with which she killed Atte, but there is no knife. The girls realize that the man driving the car is a murderer, at which point the tow truck driven by the man begins to accelerate so that the girls' car turns over. Ida is injured and unable to move. Nora tries to escape, but the man's dog catches Nora.

Nora and Ida wake up at a campfire, bound and their lips glued shut. The man then kills Nora in front of Ida. At dawn, Ida wakes up in the yard of her own house in shock. The bodies of Nora and the boys are found and Ida is accused of the murders of her friends, and no one believes the truth told by Ida.

The case is widely reported and inspired by new campers arriving at Lake Bodom. However, the mysterious murderer still stalks those who enter the woods.

== Cast ==
- Nelly Hirst-Gee as Ida
- Mimosa Willamo as Nora
- Mikael Gabriel as Elias
- Santeri Helinheimo Mäntylä as Atte
- Pirjo Lankinen as mother
- Ilkka Heiskanen as father
- Sami Eerola as hunter
- Otso Ahosola as young hunter
- Ville Saksela as teen
- Iiris Kankkunen as teen

== Reception ==
In his review for Ilta-Sanomat, Tarmo Poussu called Bodom "the first Finnish horror film that meets the international standards". Jutta Sarhimaa from Helsingin Sanomat gave the film four out of five stars, complimenting the young actors, visual production and dialogue.

Bodom received three Jussi Awards nominations for Best Picture, Female Lead (Mimosa Willamo) and Sound Design; it won the sound design award. Mimosa Willamo also won the best actress award at Screamfest in 2016.

== See also ==
- List of Finnish films of the 2010s
- The Island of Doom
