= Sami Hedberg =

Finnish stand up comedian and actor (born 1981)

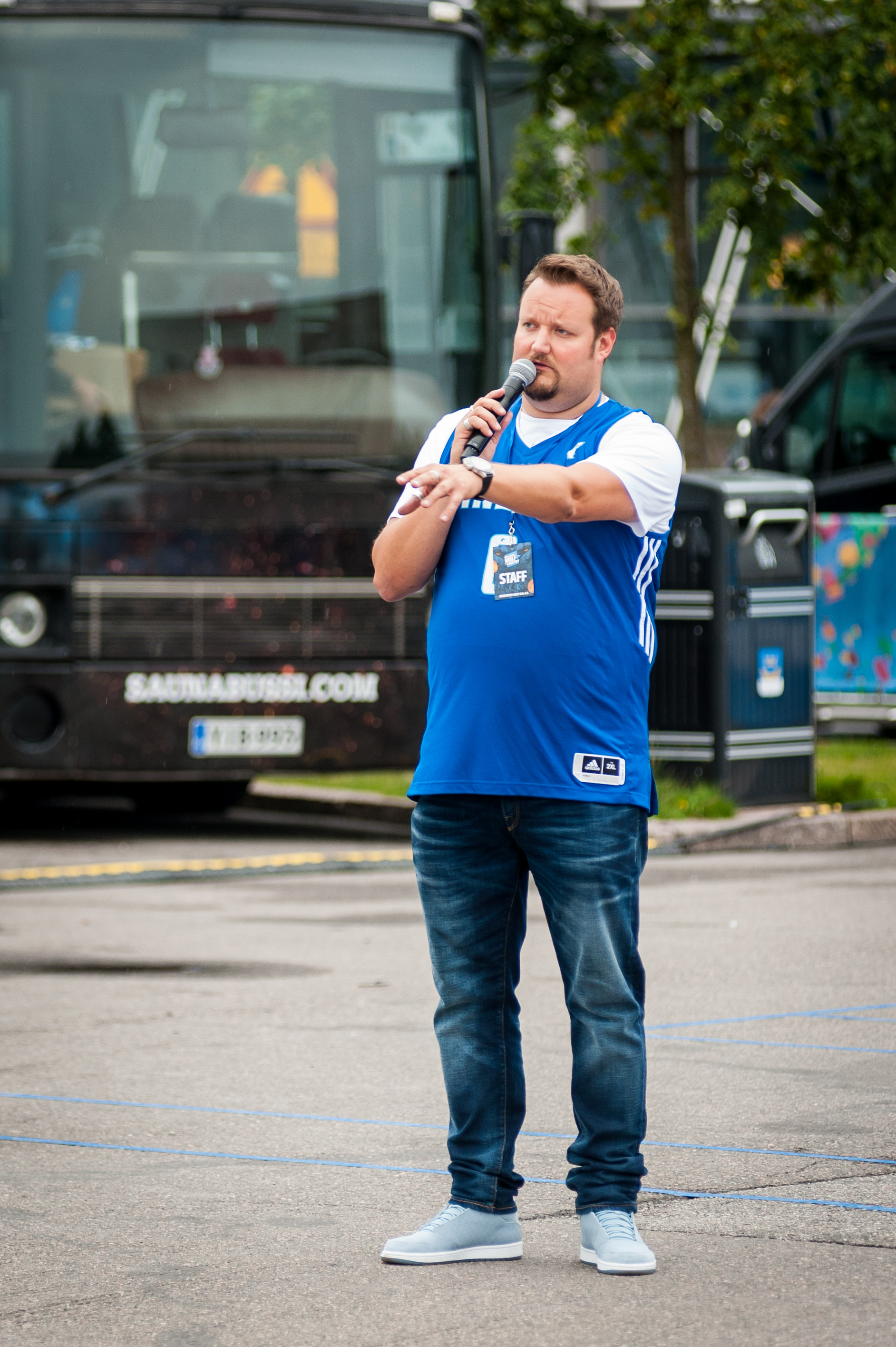
Sami Hedberg speaking during EuroBasket 2017.

Sami Henrik Hedberg (born 13 March 1981 in Helsinki) is a Finnish stand up comedian and actor. Hedberg became famous after winning the Get up, stand up competition on Sub TV in 2005. This victory caused him to become one of the most popular stand up comedians in Finland. Hedberg has his own company, The Showhouse OY, founded in 2005.

Sami Hedberg has appeared in TV shows such as Komiikkatehdas and Nevada. In 2008, Hedberg provided the Finnish voice of Rhino the hamster in the film Bolt. Together with comedian Joona Kortesmäki, Hedberg hosted the first season of the YLE entertainment show Lauantaiprojekti. Hedberg and Kortesmäki also hosted the 2011 Emma-gaala. Sami Hedberg has also hosted the Heräämö show at the radio station The Voice.

As an actor, he has performed in films such as Luokkakokous (2015), Luokkakokous 2 – polttarit (2016) and Se mieletön remppa (2020) as well as in the Finnish version of The Office (2017).

In autumn 2013, Hedberg participated in the 8th season of the show Tanssii tähtien kanssa. His partner was the dance teacher Anna Sainila.

In 2020, he became the winner of the first season of Masked Singer Suomi with his character, Lion.

The singer Mikko Kuustonen is Hedberg's maternal uncle and his daughters, actresses Iina and Minka, are Hedberg's cousins.
