= Oven homicide =

Death of Hilkka Hillevi Saarinen, née Pylkkänen (1927–1960)

The oven homicide (Finnish: uunisurma) refers to the homicide of Hilkka Hillevi Saarinen, née Pylkkänen (b. 1 November 1927; d. 23 December 1960), in the village of Krootila in Kokemäki, Finland, in December 1960. It is one of Finland's best-known homicide cases, and the killer has never been officially identified.

== Events ==
Hilkka Saarinen was last seen alive in December 1960, when she was 33 years old. She lived together with her husband, Pentti Frans Olavi Saarinen, in a large, historic wooden house, her childhood home which she had inherited from her grandparents. The couple had taken a bank loan to buy out the other inheritors. Hilkka and Pentti had five children, who, due to family trouble and the father's violent tendencies, were adopted by the state and placed in foster homes. According to the children and village neighbours, Pentti was extremely jealous and violent toward Hilkka while under the influence of alcohol, and he had repeatedly threatened to kill his wife in a way that could not be traced.

On 25 December 1960, Hilkka and Pentti's eldest son, Seppo, arrived to visit his parents' house for the holidays together with his schoolmate, one day earlier than he had previously said. They found the front door unlocked, so they crossed the entry room and entered the foyer. At this time, Pentti emerged from the large kitchen to the foyer, locking the door behind him. He blocked the boys' way, wondering aloud at their early arrival. When Seppo asked where his mother was, Pentti told him she had left while he had been sleeping. At Seppo's suggestion that Hilkka might be in a local house where she had previously worked, Pentti replied, "she's never there".

Later that night, when it was dark, the boys went to fetch more bedsheets from the master bedroom, located behind the kitchen. When Seppo asked why the kitchen was dark, his father said the lamp was broken. They walked through the kitchen in the narrow streak of light coming from the doorways of the foyer and the master bedroom. However, the boys saw that all the miscellaneous junk that had accumulated on top of the large oven over the years had been thrown onto the floor. The father said he had been cleaning up in the dark, even though the master bedroom and the foyer were lit. Also, the knuckles of his one hand had been scraped.

The father had closely followed the boys' movements and displayed nervousness and paranoia. As a result, the schoolmate went home early. Seppo let the matter be. There was no sign of Hilkka Saarinen, and Pentti appeared unbothered by her disappearance.

As the years passed, Seppo visited the home occasionally, usually staying for a couple of days. He also observed the house and its surrounding perimeter. He inspected the basement at the end of the house, with a ground bottom and stone walls, and the outdoor toilet and its surroundings a short distance apart. He was puzzled by the disappearance of the pile of sand that had previously been in the front yard of the cow barn. After a while, the boy began to suspect that his mother was no longer alive. He began inspecting the house's plank floors, its large attic, and the stone foundation that the building rested upon, aided by a flashlight. The boy also tested the seams in the wall with his fingers. At the top of the wall, the seams "felt like full, fine and separate pebbles".

In 1966, Seppo sent a letter to the police: "I suspect that my father knows more about the disappearance of my mother than he has told me. He has clearly opened the oven and shut it again. However, the oven had not been used in seven to eight years before this. My father was cleaning in the dark, even though another room was lit, when I arrived. I think the oven should be dismantled. My father could do anything." The letter was not noted. Later, the son wrote an article in the May 1967 issue of Elämä magazine, titled "Where do they disappear/I suspect my father is a murderer", where he suspected his father of having murdered his mother. When the father and son met some time after the writing of the Elämä article, the father said: "Let's just both mind our own business."

It was only in 1972, after new investigators had been ordered to go through cold cases, that the son was contacted again, because of the letter. He also got to read the interrogation material related to the case. It contained many irrelevant rumours that had been circulating around the village. Small inconsistencies between the stories gave reason to investigate the son's suspicions further.

On Hilkka's name day, 27 November 1972, 12 years after her disappearance, the Turku district commissar Gunnar Kivelä and his assistant arrived in Kokemäki with a document that authorized them to dismantle the Saarinen family oven. The husband was moved to the police station before the police started to dismantle the oven, finding it filled with sand. In one metre's depth, they found the mummified head of a woman. After digging some more, they found a foot, and finally the entire body. The body was transported to Pori, the regional capital. The next day, the eldest son identified the body as Hilkka Saarinen, his mother.

== Trial ==
The case was heard in the local court. In court, Pentti did not request a defense attorney; he was assigned an attorney by the Court, under the assumption that he could not make decisions by himself in regards to his rights and freedom. Throughout the hearing, he denied the charges. At one point, he said that Romani people had broken into his house shortly before 23 December 1960, but the theory was immediately rejected. Many witnesses told the court how Hilkka had complained about her husband hitting her, as well as the resulting injuries, which she had repeatedly visited the doctor for. This was the best case, in addition to the evidence, that the prosecutor had against Pentti. One piece of evidence that was ignored was his loans from the library; from April to December 1960, he had borrowed 75 crime fiction novels from the library, of which many were about murder, including the murder of one's wife.

The Kokemäki local court decided that Pentti had not caused Saarinen's death on purpose, and sentenced him to eight years' imprisonment for manslaughter. However, Pentti only served one year of his sentence, after the Turku District Court and the Supreme Court of Finland freed him. They each claimed that neither the cause nor manner of Hilkka Saarinen's death was known, and one could no longer be sentenced for accidental killing after 12 years. Pentti returned to the house, which had been empty the entire time, and was well on its way to deterioration. He lived there alone until his death on 1 August 1986.

The case has been marked in the police records as an unsolved crime.

== Literature ==
- Hannes Markkula: Kuusi suomalaista murhaa. (Gummerus, 1997) ISBN 951-20-5081-1
- Pohjolan poliisi kertoo/Poliisi kertoo 1974 (Pohjolan Poliisin Urheiluliitto). Printed by Elanders Boktryckeri AB 1974 / Kungsbacka, Sweden
