= 2006 Ulvila homicide case =

2006 homicide in Finland

The Ulvila homicide (Finnish: Ulvilan surma) occurred in Ulvila, Finland, on December 1, 2006. The victim was 51-year-old Jukka S. Lahti, a social psychologist and father of four. Initially, the police were looking for an outside perpetrator. In September 2009, the victim's widow Anneli Auer was arrested and charged with the murder. She was twice convicted in a district court, but both times the appeals court reversed the verdict. In December 2015, the acquittal became permanent, when the Supreme Court of Finland denied the prosecution's appeal.

== Night of the murder and initial investigation ==
The victim's wife, Anneli Auer (born 1965), called the emergency services at 02:43 on 1 December 2006. According to Auer, a masked assailant had attacked her husband in the family home. Lahti had been stabbed multiple times and hit on the head with a blunt object. Auer had also been wounded.

The police detained or arrested several people during the investigation. According to one hypothesis from police, the murder was revenge for Lahti's actions as a HR director in a company that had laid many people off. In the spring of 2008, the police tested the DNA of hundreds of the company's employees. None matched the unknown DNA found at the crime scene. The unknown DNA was later attributed to a police investigator.

== Auer arrested ==
In August 2008, the case received a new chief investigator, and the police started to focus on the phone call that Auer had made to the emergency services. According to the police, the tape had no evidence of an outside killer. The tape had also been analyzed by the FBI.

An undercover officer befriended Auer and they dated for 7–8 months. The police also bugged Auer's phone and her home for three days. According to a police representative, the undercover operation yielded neither inculpatory nor exculpatory evidence. In May 2011, the Supreme Court of Finland ordered the National Bureau of Investigation to hand over information about the operation to Auer, withholding the names of officers and some other details.

On 28 September 2009, Anneli Auer was arrested. The official theory from the police was that she had finished Lahti off during the phone call and then staged the crime scene.

Auer was tried before a three-judge panel in the Satakunta District Court. In November 2010, she was found guilty. One of the judges had voted to acquit her. Auer appealed the verdict to the Vaasa Court of Appeal, which in July 2011 acquitted her of all charges. The verdict was unanimous.

== Second set of trials ==
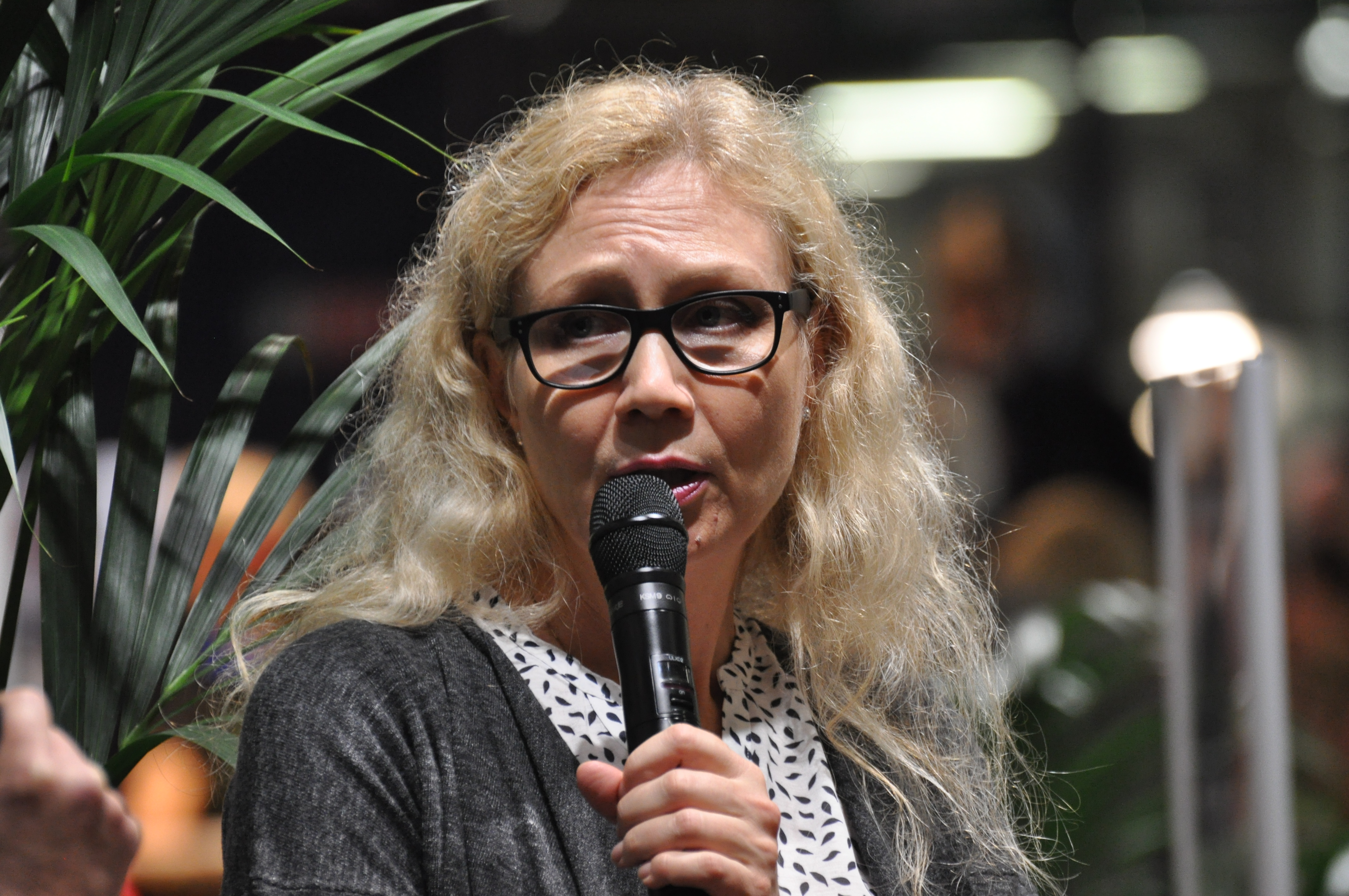
Anneli Auer at 2016 Helsinki Book Fair

In October 2012, the Supreme Court of Finland decided to send the case back to the Satakunta District Court, because of new evidence the prosecutors had presented after Auer's appeal.

In the summer of 2013 it was reported that the DNA sample that was taken from the crime scene had in fact been contaminated. The unknown male DNA belonged to a crime laboratory examiner.

In December 2013, the Satakunta District Court again convicted Auer in a 2–1 ruling, and gave her a life sentence.

Auer appealed against her second conviction to the Vaasa Court of Appeal. The appeal hearings began in September 2014 and ended in October. In February 2015, the Vaasa Court of Appeal overturned her conviction for the second time. The verdict was 2–1, with one of the judges ruling to uphold the District Court's verdict. According to the verdict, it had not been proven that Auer had staged the crime scene, and the presence of an outside perpetrator could not be ruled out based on the evidence. The court did not accept the prosecution's claim that the phone call to the emergency services contained parts that Auer had pre-recorded. The judge who voted to convict Auer was of the opinion that she was the killer and had staged the crime scene.

The prosecutors appealed to the Supreme Court and provided the court with new evidence. An analysis done on behalf of the prosecution claimed to prove that the phone call had been pre-recorded by Auer. By pre-recording the sounds of the killing before the phone call, Auer would have had more time to stage the crime scene. The analysis also concluded that Auer had yelled "Die" (kuole) instead of "Don't die" (älä kuole), as she claimed. The defense team rebutted the claim with their own expert statement, which stated that the tape had no evidence of tampering, and that an outside person can be heard on it. In December 2015, the Supreme Court dismissed the appeal and upheld the Court of Appeal verdict which had found Auer not guilty of the murder of her husband.

Auer had spent more than 600 days in prison for the murder, and in 2016 she was awarded a compensation of about 500,000 euros. At 800 euros per day it was the highest compensation given to a falsely imprisoned person in Finland.

In 2016 over 50 police officers were charged for trying to access Auer's information in the police database. Most of them received a fine.

== See also ==
- List of unsolved murders (2000–present)
