= Lake Bodom =

Lake in Finland

Lake Bodom Bodominjärvi Bodom träsk
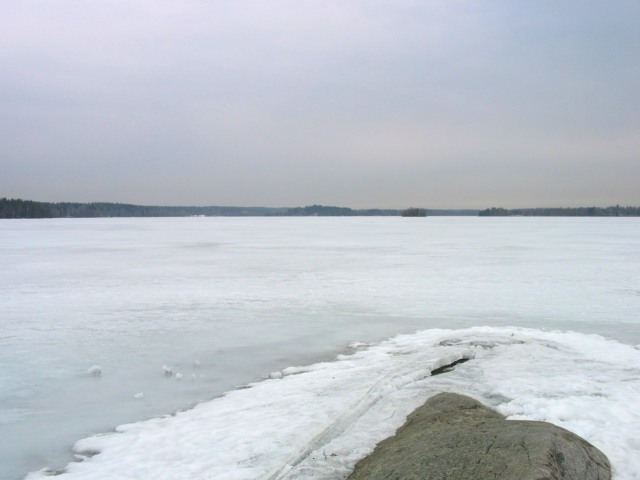
- Lake Bodom in April 2004
- Interactive map of Lake Bodom; Bodominjärvi; Bodom träsk
- Location: Espoo, Finland
- Coordinates: 60°15′23″N 24°40′00″E
- Basin countries: Finland
- Max. length: 3 km (1.9 mi)
- Max. width: 1 km (0.62 mi)
- Surface area: 3 km^{2} (1.2 sq mi)

Lake Bodom (Finnish: Bodominjärvi; Swedish: Bodom träsk) is a Finnish lake located in the city of Espoo, not far from Helsinki. The lake measures approximately three kilometres in length and one kilometre in width. It is surrounded by five districts in Espoo: Kunnarla in the west, Röylä in the north, Bodom in the northeast, Högnäs in the southeast, and Karhusuo in the southwest.

The lake is notorious for being the scene of a triple homicide that occurred in the early morning hours of 5 June 1960, when four teenagers (two boys, Nils Gustafsson and Seppo Boisman and two girls, Tuulikki Mäki and Irmeli Björklund) went on a camping trip to the lake and were mysteriously attacked while sleeping in their tent. Three were killed and one survived. In June 2005, the only survivor, Gustafsson, was charged with murdering his friends. On 7 October 2005, the district court found him not guilty of all charges.

The Finnish melodic death metal band Children of Bodom, who are also from Espoo, derive their name from the lake.
