= 78th Jussi Awards =

2025 Finnish film awards ceremony

- Date: 22 March 2024
- Site: Merikaapelihalli, Kaapelitehdas, Helsinki, Finland
- Hosted by: Katariina Kaitue; Jaana Saarinen
- Organized by: Filmiaura

Highlights
- Most awards: Sisu (4)
- Most nominations: Family Time (11)

The 78th annual Jussi Awards, presented by Filmiaura, honoring the achievement in Finnish cinema in 2023, took place on 22 March 2024 at the Merikaapelihalli at Kaapelitehdas in Helsinki. The ceremony was hosted by actors Katariina Kaitue and Jaana Saarinen.

Comedy drama film Family Time won the Best Film and two other awards. Action thriller film Sisu won the most awards of the ceremony with four. Other winners included Je'vida with three, Death Is a Problem, Four Little Adults, The Homecoming, How to Please, Lapua 1976, and Light Light Light with one.

== Winners and nominees ==
The nominations were announced on 25 January 2024. Comedy drama film Family Time led the nominations with eleven, followed by action thriller film Sisu with nine and drama film Je'vida with seven.

Winners are listed first, highlighted in boldface, and indicated with a double-dagger (‡).

**Best Film**: **Family Time – Jussi Rantamäki and Emilia Haukka**‡; Fallen Leaves – Aki Kaurismäki, Misha Jaari, and Mark Lwoff; Je'vida – Joonas Berghäll, Satu Majava, and Anna Nuru; Lapua 1976 – Pekka Pohjoispää and Mikko Jokipii; Sisu – Petri Jokiranta	**Best Director**: **Tia Kouvo – Family Time**‡; Aki Kaurismäki – Fallen Leaves; Jalmari Helander – Sisu
**Best Leading Performance**: **Alma Pöysti – Four Little Adults as Juulia**‡; Jussi Vatanen – Fallen Leaves as Holappa; Leena Uotila – Family Time as Ella	**Best Supporting Performance**: **Jari Virman – Death Is a Problem for the Living as Arto Niska**‡; Ria Kataja – Family Time as Susanna; Tom Wentzel – Family Time as Lasse
**Best Newcomer in Acting**: **Rebekka Baer – Light Light Light as Mariia**‡; Saara Elina Kilpinen – Detour to Father as Sofia; Sakari Topi – Family Time as Simo	**Audience Award for Acting**: **Linnea Leino – Lapua 1976 as Kaisa Mäkelä**‡; Alma Pöysti – Fallen Leaves as Ansa; Jarkko Niemi – Syke: Särkynyt sydän as Petteri Holopainen; Jorma Tommila – Sisu as Aatami Korpi; Ylermi Rajamaa – Ricky Rapper and the Wild Machine as Leonard Lindberg
**Best Screenplay**: **Family Time – Tia Kouvo**‡; Death Is a Problem for the Living – Teemu Nikki; Je'vida – Katja Gauriloff and Niillas Holmberg	**Best Cinematography**: **Sisu – Kjell Lagerroos**‡; Family Time – Jesse Jalonen; Je'vida – Tuomo Hutri
**Best Editing**: **Sisu – Juho Virolainen**‡; Family Time – Okku Nuutilainen; Je'vida – Timo Peltola	**Best Production Design**: **Sisu – Otso Linnalaakso**‡; Family Time – Nanna Hirvonen; Four Little Adults – Sattva-Hanna Toiviainen
**Best Costume Design**: **Je'vida – Anu Pirilä**‡; Light Light Light – Neoon Must; Sisu – Anna Vilppunen	**Best Makeup**: **Sisu – Salla Yli-Luopa**‡; Lapua 1976 – Terhi Väänänen; Light Light Light – Küllikki Pert
**Best Original Score**: **Je'vida – Laura Naukkarinen**‡; Light Light Light – Joel Melasniemi; Sisu – Juri Seppä and Tuomas Wäinölä	**Best Sound Design**: **Je'vida – Jukka Nurmela and Timo Peltola**‡; Family Time – Jorma Kaulanen; The Good Driver – Gustaf Berger
**Best Documentary Film**: **The Homecoming – Suvi West, Anssi Kömi, and Janne Niskala**‡; Snowball Effect – Pauliina Punkki and Kaisa Astikainen; Under Construction – Markus Toivo and Kalervo Aho	**Best Short Film**: **How to Please – Elina Talvensaari**‡; Blush: An Extraordinary Voyage – Iiti Yli-Harja; Thank You in Your Language – Fabian Munsterhjelm
**Honorary Award for Visual Effects**: **Sisu – Jussi Lehtiniemi and Antti Kulmala**‡	**People's Choice**: **Lapua 1976 by Toni Kurkimäki**‡
**Lifetime Achievement Award**: **Kati Outinen**

=== Films with multiple nominations and awards ===
Films that received multiple nominations
Nominations	Film
11	Family Time
9	Sisu
7	Je'vida
4	Fallen Leaves
4	Light Light Light
3	Lapua 1976
2	Death Is a Problem for the Living
2	Four Little Adults

Films that received multiple awards
Awards	Film
4	Sisu
3	Family Time
3	Je'vida
