= Gauriloff =

Origin
- Language: Skolt Sámi
- Meaning: derived from the name Kaurrâl (i.e. Gabriel)
- Region of origin: Suõʹnnʼjel

Gauriloff, sometimes spelled Gaurilov, is a Skolt Saami surname originating in and around Suõʹnnʼjel, derived from the Skolt given name Kaurrâl, i.e. Gabriel. All total, 156 people, living or dead have had Gauriloff as their surname at some point in time.

Sometimes this spelling is also used in place of the Slavic surname Gavrilov.

Notable people with the surname include:

- Jaakko Gauriloff, a Skolt Sámi singer
- Katja Gauriloff, a Finnish-Skolt filmmaker and director
- Leo Gauriloff, a Skolt Sámi singer, guitarist and composer
- Matleena Fofonoff (Skolt Sami: Maadrân Evvan nijdd, née Gauriloff, b. 1949), Skolt master craftsman and artisan and recipient of the Skolt of the Year Award in 2009

== See also ==
- Gavrilov
