= Fofonoff =

Fofonoff is a Skolt Saami surname.

Notable people with the surname include:

- Kati-Claudia Fofonoff (1947–2011), Skolt Saami author
- Matleena Fofonoff (Skolt Sami: Maadrân Evvan nijdd, née Gauriloff, b. 1949), Skolt master craftsman and artisan and recipient of the Skolt of the Year Award in 2009
- Elias Fofonoff (Skolt Sami: Riiggu Eeʹlljaž), recipient of the Skolt of the Year Award in 2008
- Ville-Riiko Fofonoff (Skolt Sami: Läärvan-Oʹlssi-Peâtt-Rijggu-Vääʹsǩ-Rijggu-Ville-Reeiǥaž), the first person to take the mother tongue portion of the Finnish matriculation exam in Skolt Saami and recipient of the Skolt of the Year Award in 2012
