= Lovemilla =

Finnish teen television series

#Lovemilla
- Genre: Comedy; Drama; Teen Drama
- Directed by: Teemu Nikki
- Starring: Milka Suonpää; Pauliina Suominen; Miina Penttinen; Lauri Jokinen; Joel Hirvonen
- Country of origin: Finland
- Original language: Finnish
- No. of seasons: 2
- No. of episodes: 50

Production
- Running time: approx. 5 min
- Production companies: YLE; It's Alive Productions

Original release
- Network: YLE TV2 (Finland); Yle Areena (Finland)
- Release: May 31, 2013

#lovemilla is a Finnish teen television drama. The plot revolves around 17-year-old Milla, who works at Café Robot. Milla and her friends spend their days in a cafeteria of an unnamed small town – a very familiar setting for the target audience in Finland. #lovemilla is a comedic teen drama, but it deals with difficult matters such as drugs, sex and death. Series won the best children's and youth program award at the Kultainen Venla 2013.

#lovemilla is a content series for teenagers, where cross media is thought from the side of audience, not from broadcaster's perspective. The story is told through content pieces that are scattered along social media and TV.

== Cast ==
- Milka Suonpää as Milla Mäntynen
- Joel Hirvonen as Aimo
- Pauliina Suominen as Siiri
- Miina Penttinen as Gootti-Gitta
- Lauri Jokinen as Saku
- Teemu Nieminen as Ämpäri
- Jouko Puolanto as Roope
- Elina Knihtilä as Pirjo
