= 80th Jussi Awards =

2026 Finnish film awards ceremony

- Date: 20 March 2026
- Site: Messukeskus Helsinki, Helsinki, Finland
- Hosted by: Gogi Mavromichalis
- Organized by: Filmiaura

Highlights
- Most awards: A Light That Never Goes Out (7)
- Most nominations: A Light That Never Goes Out (10)

Television coverage
- Channel: MTV3

The 80th annual Jussi Awards, presented by Filmiaura, honoring the achievement in Finnish cinema in 2025, took place on 20 March 2026 at the Messukeskus in Helsinki. The ceremony was hosted by presenter Gogi Mavromichalis and broadcast by MTV3.

Drama film A Light That Never Goes Out won the most awards with seven, including Best Film.

== Nominations ==
The nominations were announced on 28 January 2026. Drama film A Light That Never Goes Out led the nominations with ten, comedy film 100 Litres of Gold followed with six and drama film Raptures with five.

Winners are listed first, highlighted in boldface, and indicated with a double-dagger (‡).

**Best Film**: **A Light That Never Goes Out – Ilona Tolmunen**‡; 100 Litres of Gold – Jani Pösö; Orenda – Misha Jaari and Mark Lwoff; Raptures – Andreas Emanuelsson and Tony Österholm; Sisu: Road to Revenge – Petri Jokiranta	**Best Director**: **Lauri-Matti Parppei – A Light That Never Goes Out**‡; Jalmari Helander – Sisu: Road to Revenge; Teemu Nikki – 100 Litres of Gold
**Best Leading Performance**: **Samuel Kujala – A Light That Never Goes Out as Pauli**‡; Jessica Grabowsky – Raptures as Rakel; Jonna Järnefelt – How to Shout as Anu	**Best Supporting Performance**: **Ville Tiihonen – 100 Litres of Gold as Hauki**‡; Pirjo Lonka – Teräsleidit – kuin viimeistä päivää as Maija; Sanna-Kaisa Palo – Teräsleidit – kuin viimeistä päivää as Kerttu
**Best Breakthrough Performance**: **Anna Rosaliina Kauno – A Light That Never Goes Out as Iiris**‡; Bruno Baer – Summer Is Crazy as Arttu; Ona Huczkowski – Defiant as Vilma	**Best Ensemble**: **100 Litres of Gold – Pirjo Lonka and Elina Knihtilä**‡; The Summer Book – Glenn Close and Emily Matthews; Summer Is Crazy – Bruno Baer and Aamu Milonoff
**Best Screenplay**: **A Light That Never Goes Out – Lauri-Matti Parppei**‡; 100 Litres of Gold – Teemu Nikki; How to Shout – Josefina Rautiainen	**Best Cinematography**: **Orenda – Max Smeds**‡; E – Matti Pyykkö; Lessons in Fire – Jarkko T. Laine
**Best Editing**: **The Helsinki Effect – Markus Leppälä and Arthur Franck**‡; E – Anna Eriksson; A Light That Never Goes Out – Frida Eggum Michaelsen	**Best Production Design**: **Raptures – Vilja Katramo and Okku Rahikainen**‡; 100 Litres of Gold – Maria Hahl; A Light That Never Goes Out – Nanna Hirvonen
**Best Costume Design**: **Never Alone – Eugen Tamberg**‡; A Light That Never Goes Out – Mimosa Kuusimäki; Orenda – Jaanus Vahtra	**Best Makeup**: **Sisu: Road to Revenge – Salla Yli-Luopa**‡; Backwood Madness – Aleksanteri Jaakkola and Ari Savonen; Raptures – Saara Räisänen
**Best Original Score**: **A Light That Never Goes Out – Lauri-Matti Parppei**‡; E – Anna Eriksson; Raptures – Rebekka Karijord	**Best Sound Design**: **A Light That Never Goes Out – Juuso Oksala and Yngve Leidulv Saetre**‡; The Helsinki Effect – Yngve Leidulv Saetre; Orenda – Jan Alvermark
**Best Documentary Film**: **The Helsinki Effect – Arthur Franck, Sandra Enkvist, and Oskar Forstén**‡; The Last Misfits by The Golden River – Juho Tanskanen and Isabella Karhu; Rebellion for Future – Saku Soukka and Oona Saari	**Best Short Film**: **My Name Is Hope – Sherwan Haji**‡; Rooms – Antti Lempiäinen; Underdog – Marjo Levlin
**Best Visual Effects**: **Sisu: Road to Revenge – Jussi Lehtiniemi**‡; The Elf – Tony Alamo; Fleak – Jussi Ditmer	**People's Choice**: **Cancel**
**Lifetime Achievement Award**: **Jussi Mäkelä**

=== Films with multiple awards and nominations ===
Films that received multiple nominations
Nominations	Film
10	A Light That Never Goes Out
6	100 Litres of Gold
5	Raptures
4	Orenda
4	Sisu: Road to Revenge
3	E
3	The Helsinki Effect
2	How to Shout
2	Summer Is Crazy
2	Teräsleidit – kuin viimeistä päivää

Films that received multiple awards
Awards	Film
7	A Light That Never Goes Out
2	100 Litres of Gold
2	The Helsinki Effect
2	Sisu: Road to Revenge
