= Skábmagovat Prize =

Sámi film award

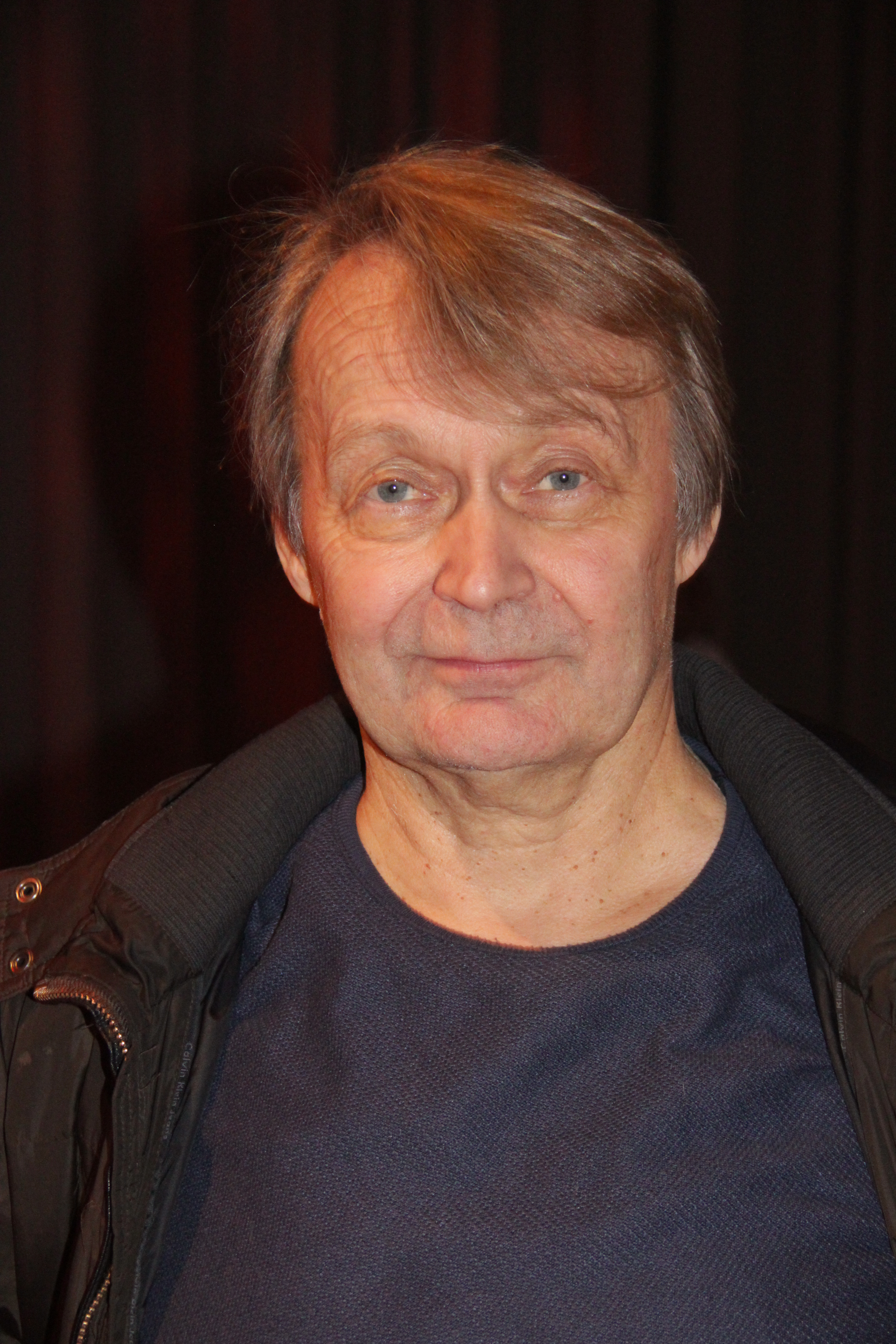
Nils Gaup in 2017

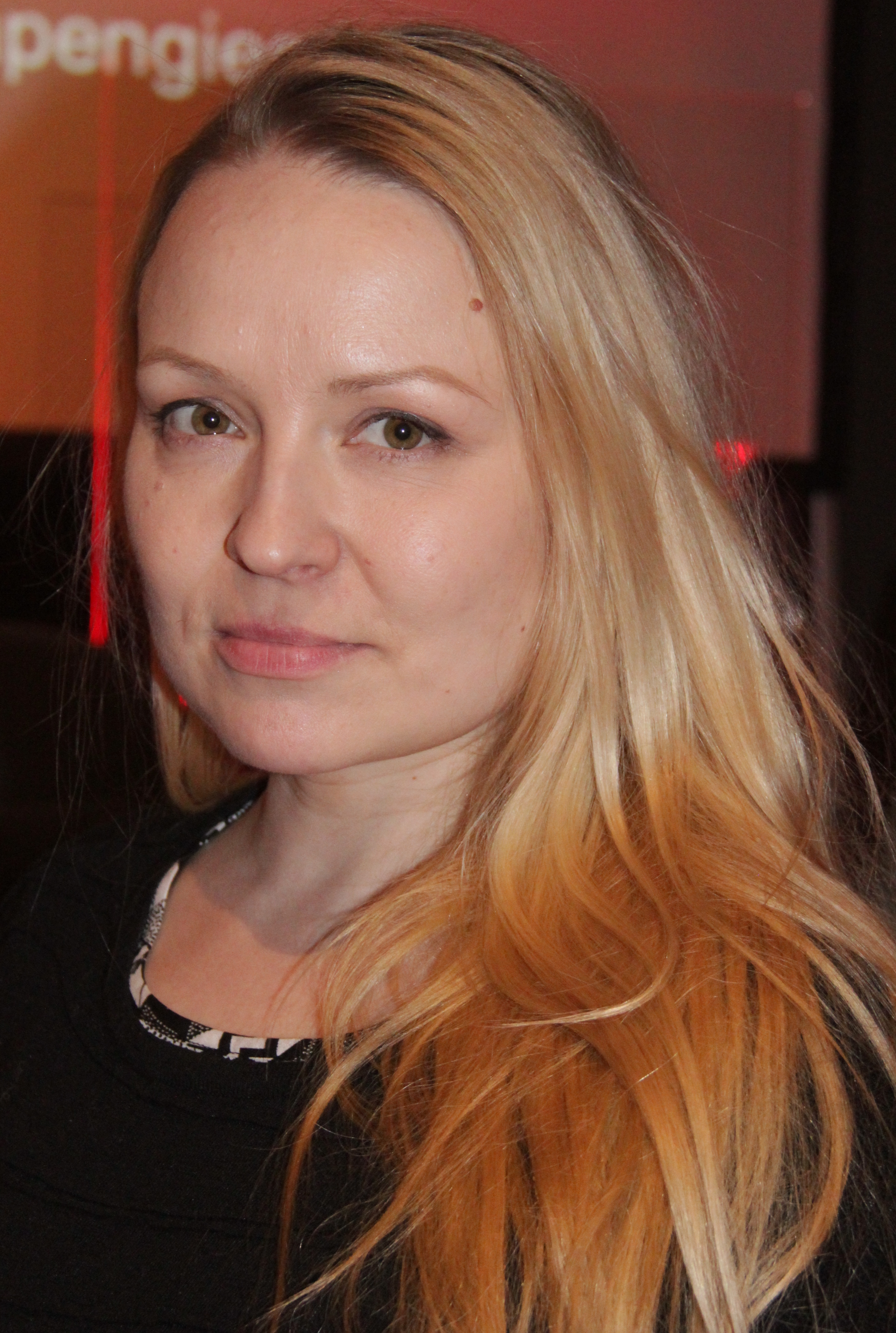
Katja Gauriloff in 2017

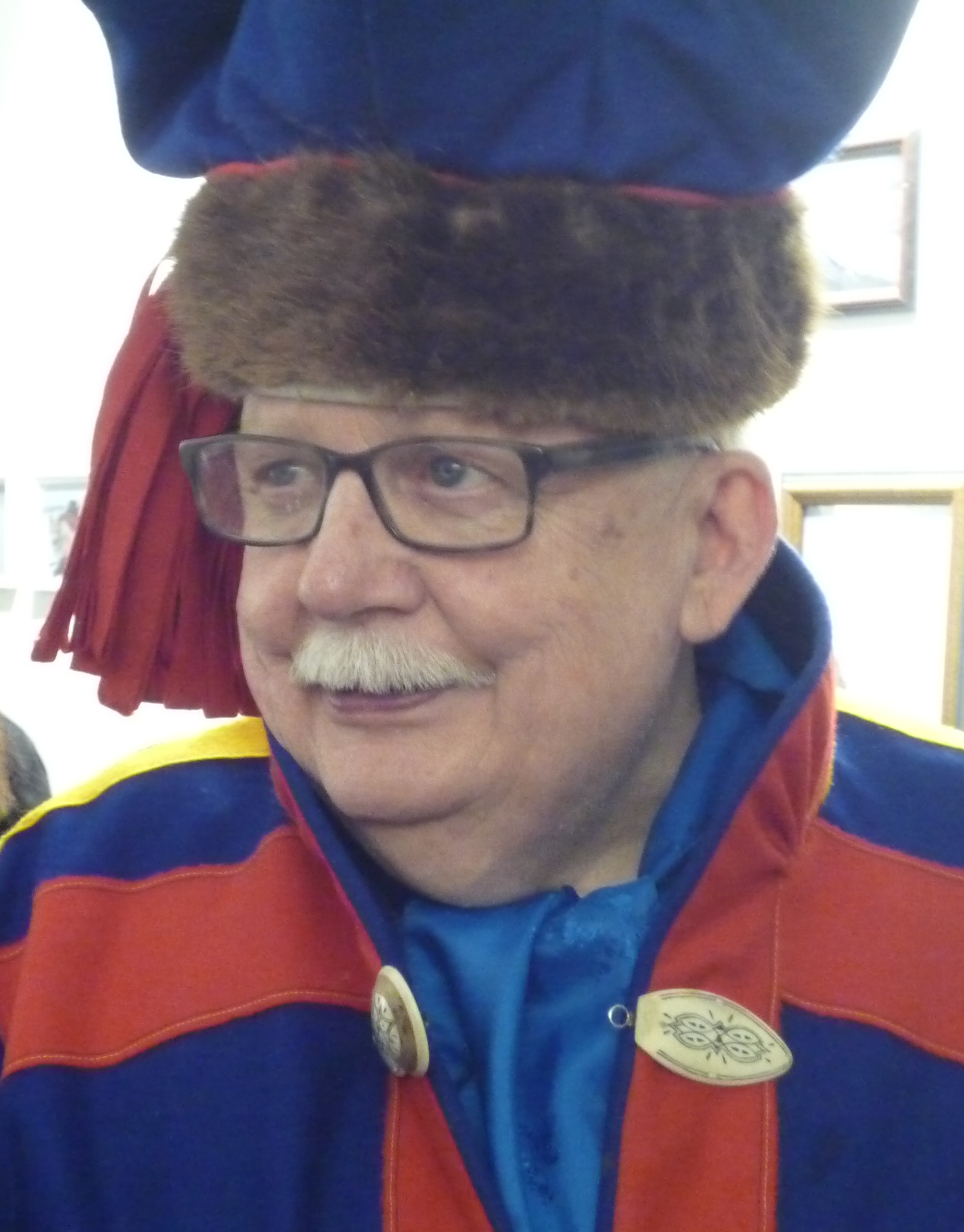
Johs. Kalvemo in 2019

The Skábmagovat Prize (Inari Sami: Skammâkoveh-palhâšume, Northern Sami: Skábmagovat-bálkkašupmi, and Finnish: Skábmagovat-palkinto) is an indigenous film award to honor the significant, long-term contributions the recipient has made to the Sámi culture and communities. The award is announced in conjunction with the Skábmagovat indigenous film festival at the end of January.

== History ==
The first prize was awarded in 2003 to Sámi journalist and film director Johs. Kalvemo in 2003. At first, the prize was awarded every three years until 2009, when it was awarded annually three times in a row. Since 2011, the prize has been awarded approximately every three years.

Over the years, quite a few of the most popular and famous Sámi film people have received this award, including the directors of the first feature films in Northern Sámi, Nils Gaup (Ofelaš) and in Skolt Sámi, Katja Gauriloff (Jeʹvida).

== Laureates ==
Year	Laureate
2003	Johs. Kalvemo
2006	Sverre Porsanger
2009	Nils Gaup
2010	Liisa Holmberg
2011	Oula Näkkäläjärvi
2013	Inger-Mari Aikio
2017	Katja Gauriloff
2020	Elle-Máijá Tailfeathers
2024	Suvi West
