= Family Time =

Family Time may refer to:

- Family Time (album), by Ziggy Marley (2009)
- Family Time (TV series), from 2012
- Family Time (film), a 2023 Finnish-Swedish comedy-drama
