= Johanna Sumuvuori =

Finnish politician

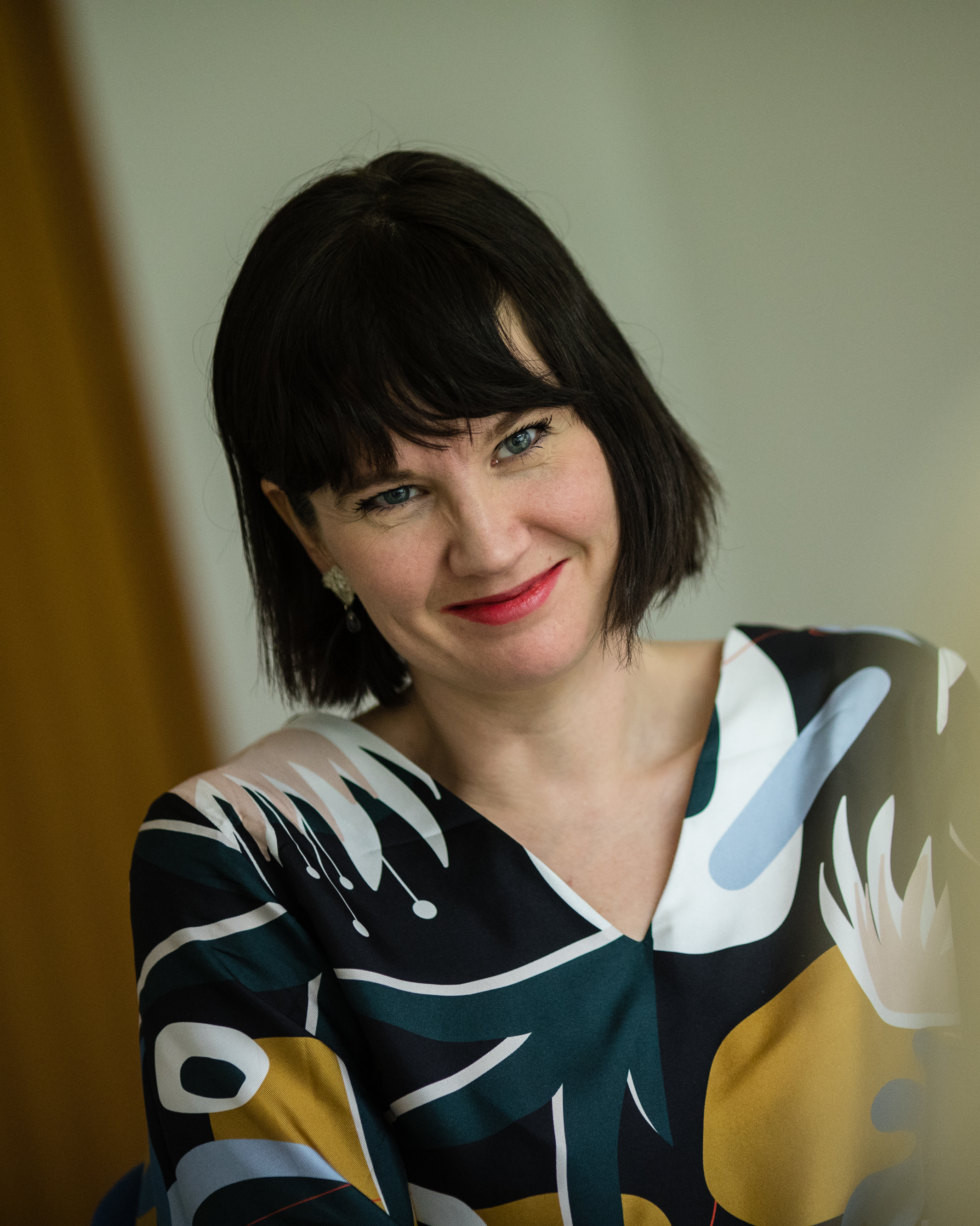
- Johanna Sumuvuori in 2020

European Centre of Excellence for Civilian Crisis Management

Personal details
- Born: November 8, 1976 Laihia, Finland
- Education: Master of Social Sciences, University of Helsinki; Master of Arts, Central Saint Martins
- Occupation: Director

Nanna Johanna Sumuvuori (born Sari Johanna Sumuvuori, November 8, 1976 in Laihia) is a Finnish civil servant and former politician.

In 2025, she became the director of the European Centre of Excellence for Civilian Crisis Management, a member-based organisation based in Berlin.

Before joining the CoE, Sumuvuori held various high-level roles including as State Secretary to the Minister for Foreign Affairs of Finland, and most recently as a Senior Advisor at the United Nations Population Fund (UNFPA) in New York. From 2015, she held the post of “Head of Programme, Society” at the Finnish Institute in London.

She is a former member of Finnish Parliament, representing the Green League. She has also been a member of the city council of Helsinki since 2001. Sumuvuori was first elected as a substitute member to the parliament in 2003, and became member of parliament on August 1, 2006, when Irina Krohn left to become the director of the Finnish Film Foundation. In 2007 she was directly elected, but failed to be returned at the General Election of April 2011. However, when Anni Sinnemäki left her seat in January 2015, Sumuvuori took her seat in the parliament for the remaining term. In the 2015 election, Sumuvuori got 4,159 votes, which was not enough for a seat in the parliament.

Before entering parliament, Sumuvuori has been active in social movements, lastly as the secretary general of Committee of 100.
