= A Light That Never Goes Out =

2025 drama film by Lauri-Matti Parppei

- Film poster
- Finnish: Jossain on valo joka ei sammu
- Directed by: Lauri-Matti Parppei
- Written by: Lauri-Matti Parppei
- Produced by: Ilona Tolmunen
- Starring: Samuel Kujala; Anna Rosaliina Kauno
- Cinematography: Mikko Parttimaa
- Edited by: Frida Eggum Michaelsen
- Music by: Lauri-Matti Parppei
- Production companies: Made; Goodtime Pictures
- Release date: 15 May 2025 (Cannes)
- Running time: 111 minutes
- Countries: Finland; Norway
- Language: Finnish

A Light That Never Goes Out (Finnish: Jossain on valo joka ei sammu) is a 2025 film written and directed by Finnish screenwriter Lauri-Matti Parppei in his feature directorial debut. The film stars Samuel Kujala and Anna Rosaliina Kauno.

The film had its world premiere at the 2025 Cannes Film Festival on 15 May 2025. It received ten nominations at the 80th Jussi Awards, including Best Film, and won seven Awards in March 2026. It was theatrically released in Finland on 12 September 2025.

== Premise ==
Successful flutist Pauli returns to his hometown, reconnects with his old schoolmate Iiris. He is later drawn into experimental music.

== Cast ==
- Samuel Kujala as Pauli
- Anna Rosaliina Kauno as Iiris

== Production ==
The film's director and screenwriter, Lauri-Matti Parppei, revealed that the film was inspired by his childhood in Rauma and by his experience starting out as a musician in the DIY music scene. Parppei developed the project at the 2019 Les Arcs Talent Village. In January 2020, the project participated at the Nordic Film Market in the Discovery section, held during the Gothenburg Film Festival. It received a €800,000 production grant from the Finnish Film Foundation in June 2024. In December 2024, it was presented at the Les Arcs Film Festival Work in Progress. In January 2025, it returned to the Nordic Film Market, presented at the Works in Progress program.

== Release ==
A Light That Never Goes Out had its world premiere at the 2025 Cannes Film Festival on 15 May in the ACID section. It was theatrically released in Finland on 12 September 2025 by B-Plan Distribution.

In 2026, the film was chosen Finland’s nomination for the Nordic Council Film Prize.

== Accolades ==
Award / Film Festival	Date of ceremony	Category	Recipient(s)	Result	Ref.
Jussi Awards	20 March 2026	Best Film	Ilona Tolmunen	Pending	
Jussi Awards	20 March 2026	Best Director	Lauri-Matti Parppei	Pending	
Jussi Awards	20 March 2026	Best Leading Performance	Samuel Kujala	Pending	
Jussi Awards	20 March 2026	Best Breakthrough Performance	Anna Rosaliina Kauno	Pending	
Jussi Awards	20 March 2026	Best Screenplay	Lauri-Matti Parppei	Pending	
Jussi Awards	20 March 2026	Best Editing	Frida Eggum Michaelsen	Pending	
Jussi Awards	20 March 2026	Best Production Design	Nanna Hirvonen	Pending	
Jussi Awards	20 March 2026	Best Costume Design	Mimosa Kuusimäki	Pending	
Jussi Awards	20 March 2026	Best Original Score	Lauri-Matti Parppei	Pending	
Jussi Awards	20 March 2026	Best Sound Design	Juuso Oksala and Yngve Leidulv Saetre	Pending	
