= 100 Litres of Gold =

- The North American film poster
- Directed by: Teemu Nikki
- Written by: Teemu Nikki
- Produced by: Jani Pösö
- Starring: Elina Knihtilä; Pirjo Lonka; Ville Tiihonen; Jari Pehkonen; Ria Kataja; Pertti Sveholm; Elmer Bäck; Jakob Öhrman
- Cinematography: Jarmo Kiuru
- Edited by: Jussi Sandhu
- Music by: Marco Biscarini
- Production companies: It's Alive Films; The Culture Business; Smile Entertainment
- Release dates: 24 October 2024 (Rome Film Festival); 28 March 2025 (Finland)
- Running time: 88 minutes
- Countries: Finland; Italy
- Language: Finnish

100 Litres of Gold (Finnish: 100 litraa sahtia) is a 2024 comedy film written and directed by Teemu Nikki. It is about two sisters who drink 100 litres of their family's famous sahti before having to quickly replace it for a wedding, the film premiered at the 19th Rome Film Festival and was released on 28 March 2025 in Finnish theaters.

It was selected as the Finnish entry for Best International Feature Film at the 98th Academy Awards, but it was not nominated.

== Synopsis ==
Taina and Pirkko, two sisters known for being the best sahti brewers in town, are asked to make 100 litres for their other sister Päivi's wedding. However, Taina and Pirkko live with alcoholism, in part due to the guilt they feel from a car crash that injured Päivi many years earlier. After working to brew the ale, they then drink all of it shortly before the wedding, and – while suffering the resulting hangover – try to find ways to get another 100 litres in time.

== Cast ==
- Elina Knihtilä as Pirkko
- Pirjo Lonka as Taina
- Ville Tiihonen as Hauki
- Ria Kataja as Päivi

== Production ==
The film is set in director Teemu Nikki's small hometown of Sysmä, with Nikki saying that despite having moved away decades earlier, he was always telling people "wild stories" about the town. His family, too, made sahti, of which he said they "are very proud". He dislikes the "country film" style made in Finland about places like Sysmä, and decided to put his own spin on it in writing 100 Litres of Gold, likening the resulting story to a Western; Nikki and producer Jani Pösö also thought that despite its differences with their own usual style of film, it was still both dark and funny. Nikki said that much of the humour is in things that are realistic, with inherently funny dialogue said with conviction, and that handling dark subjects with comedy shows "that humankind still has some kind of hope."

Nikki originally envisaged his story with male main characters, but saw a play starring Elina Knihtilä and Pirjo Lonka and knew he had to cast them, saying: "You don't fuck with these ladies. They demand respect and they are tough, although they carry this darkness with them." Nikki sought out the actresses because he knew he could trust them to "deliver this kind of role, because it's not that easy [...] to be very gross and funny but also lovable and realistic." Often writing specific roles for certain actors, Nikki did so again, getting Knihtilä and Lonka on board ahead of production. After they joined, he spent a year and a half writing the film, working collaboratively with them after each draft.

As they worked with Italian company I Wonder, the production was able to bring on board Marco Biscarini, who studied under Ennio Morricone, as composer.

== Release ==
100 Litres of Gold had its world premiere in official selection in October 2024 at the 19th Rome Film Festival, after appearing in the industry selection at the 2024 Toronto International Film Festival film market in September. For the Italian premiere, the filmmakers shipped twenty litres of unfermented sahti to Rome, before brewing it at the Finnish Embassy there to serve and "introduce this drink to the entire world" – Pösö was late to press for the film because he was buying a suitcase for the sahti. They planned to do the same at the Tallinn Black Nights Film Festival in November 2024.

The film will compete in the Awards Buzz – Best International Feature Film section of the 37th Palm Springs International Film Festival on 3 January 2026.

== Accolades ==
Award	Date of ceremony	Category	Recipient(s)	Result	Ref.
Rome Film Festival	October 2024	Best Film (Progressive Cinema Competition)	100 Litres of Gold	Nominated	
Tallinn Black Nights Film Festival	29 November 2024	Grand Prix: Best Film	Teemu Nikki, Jani Pösö	Nominated	
Tallinn Black Nights Film Festival	29 November 2024	Best Director	Teemu Nikki	Nominated	
Tallinn Black Nights Film Festival	29 November 2024	Best Cinematography	Jarmo Kiuru	Nominated	
Tallinn Black Nights Film Festival	29 November 2024	Best Script	Teemu Nikki	Nominated	
Tallinn Black Nights Film Festival	29 November 2024	Best Original Score	Marco Biscarini	Nominated	
Tallinn Black Nights Film Festival	29 November 2024	Best Production Design	Maria Hahl	Nominated	
Tallinn Black Nights Film Festival	29 November 2024	Best Actress	Elina Knihtilä	Won	(Note: The Best Actress award was given to both lead actresses ex aequo for their roles in the film.)
Tallinn Black Nights Film Festival	29 November 2024	Best Actress	Pirjo Lonka	Won	(Note: The Best Actress award was given to both lead actresses ex aequo for their roles in the film.)
Jussi Awards	20 March 2026	Best Film	Jani Pösö	Pending	
Jussi Awards	20 March 2026	Best Director	Teemu Nikki	Pending	
Jussi Awards	20 March 2026	Best Supporting Performance	Ville Tiihonen	Pending	
Jussi Awards	20 March 2026	Best Ensemble	Pirjo Lonka and Elina Knihtilä	Pending	
Jussi Awards	20 March 2026	Best Screenplay	Teemu Nikki	Pending	
Jussi Awards	20 March 2026	Best Production Design	Maria Hahl	Pending	

== See also ==
- List of submissions to the 98th Academy Awards for Best International Feature Film
- List of Finnish submissions for the Academy Award for Best International Feature Film
