= Irina Krohn =

Finnish politician (born 1962)

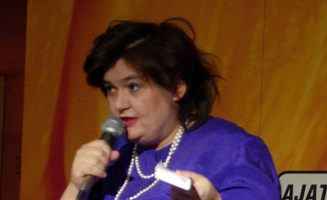
Irina Krohn in 2005

Irina Kaarina Krohn (born 10 July 1962) is a Finnish politician and a former member of Finnish Parliament, representing the Green League. She is also member of the city council of Helsinki and has held positions in various other organisations. She was first elected to the parliament in 1995. She was a substitute member of the Parliamentary Assembly of the Council of Europe and a member of the Sub-Committees on Sustainable Development and Population.

In December 2005, Krohn was appointed the new managing director of the Finnish Film Foundation; she was succeeded in the Parliament by another Green from Helsinki, Johanna Sumuvuori.

Krohn was born in Helsinki, Finland. She has a master's from the Theatre Academy of Finland. Krohn was married 18 years to the movie director Wille Mäkelä. They have two children, Rudolf (b. 1993) and Frida (b. 1997). Krohn is the niece of the Finnish author and journalist Kaarina Goldberg.
