= Jeʹvida =

- Finnish film poster
- Directed by: Katja Gauriloff
- Written by: Katja Gauriloff; Niillas Holmberg
- Produced by: Joonas Berghäll; Satu Majava; Anna Nuru
- Starring: Agafia Niemenmaa; Heidi U'lljan Gauriloff; Sanna-Kaisa Palo
- Cinematography: Tuomo Hutri
- Edited by: Timo Peltola
- Music by: Lau Nau
- Production company: Oktober
- Distributed by: Future Film (Finland)
- Release dates: 9 June 2023 (Tribeca Festival); 13 September 2023 (TIFF); 20 October 2023 (Finland)
- Running time: 103 min
- Country: Finland
- Languages: Skolt Sámi; Finnish

Jeʹvida is a 2023 Finnish Skolt Sámi–language drama film written and directed by Katja Gauriloff. The film describes the life of a Skolt Sámi woman called Jeʹvida during the period when her people were being forcibly assimilated into Finnish society, while following the life of Jeʹvida in three different periods.

== Background ==
Jeʹvida is the first feature film shot in the Skolt Sámi language. It received monetary support from the International Sámi Film Institute and the Finnish Film Foundation in 2021.

In the film, Gauriloff depicts the discrimination and forced assimilation the Skolts experienced and the resulting mental trauma that still affects them. The director, who is also Skolt, had similar experiences in her childhood.

== Plot summary ==
A chain-smoking elderly Iida (Sanna-Kaisa Palo) and her relative Sanna (Seidi Haarla) drive to Lapland to look at an inherited family house, with the intention of cleaning it up to prepare the house for sale. After arriving at the location, the house and its surroundings start to evoke painful memories in Iida, who has experienced mistreatment and forced assimilation into Finnish culture due to her being Skolt Sámi. Iida's mind dives deeper into the secrets of the past and she rediscovers her true self, Jeʹvida.

== Cast ==
- Agafia Niemenmaa as young Jeʹvida
- Heidi Uʹlljan Gauriloff as the young adult Jeʹvida/Iida
- Sanna-Kaisa Palo as the older Jeʹvida/Iida
- Heini Wesslin as Jeʹvida's mother
- Erkki Gauriloff as Jeʹvida's grandfather
- Matleena Fofonoff as Jeʹvida's grandmother
- Jarkko Lahti as the teacher
- Seidi Haarla as Sanna

== Reception ==
The film had its world premiere in June 2023 at the Tribeca Festival in New York. The film was also shown at the Toronto Film Festival in September of the same year. It was one of three Sámi films present at the festival.

On the review aggregator website Rotten Tomatoes, 83% of 6 critics' reviews are positive, with an average rating of 7.10/10.

Aki Lehti from Muropaketti gives the film a rating of 4½ stars out of 5, saying that the film is a "sadly beautiful and touching work of art, a really necessary film about a silent subject." Niina Oisalo of Film-O-Holic gives 4 stars out of 5, describing the film as "a skillfully executed magical realist drama", adding that "the film's breathy, natural rhythm brings out the bonds that unite generations without unnecessary explanation." Niko Ikonen from Episodi gives the film 3 stars out of 5, comparing the film's subject to the 2016 Swedish film Sami Blood, saying that "unfortunately, Jeʹvida doesn't really get its message across, and the film's script does not support the weight of such a heavy and multifaceted subject."

== See also ==
- List of Finnish films of the 2020s
- Sámi films
- Skolts
