= Leo Gauriloff =

Finnish singer and composer (1956–2019)

- Born: 5 October 1956; Inari, Finland
- Died: 23 August 2019 (aged 62) Stockholm, Sweden
- Occupations: Musician, songwriter
- Instruments: acoustic steel string guitar, sambur, mandola, buzuki, synthesizer

Leo Gauriloff (5 October 1956 – 23 August 2019) was a Skolt Sámi singer, guitarist and composer. He was known mainly for playing acoustic steel string guitars, but he also played other acoustic string instruments, such the sambur, the mandola, the buzuki, as well as synthesizers.

== Biography ==
Gauriloff grew up in Mustola, Inari, in the vicinity of Nellim. He lost his mother in an act of murder, which upset the whole village. He was then raised by his grandmother, from whom he learnt the Skolt Sámi language. Gauriloff built his first guitar from particle board, and he would amplify the sound by pressing it against the boiling pot of the sauna.

There were others, too, in the family who had an active interest in cultural matters. Music became the choice of career for Leo Gauriloff and his older brother Jaakko (born 1939). Their niece Katja Gauriloff became a well-known film director.

Hopes were placed in Leo Gauriloff that he would become the first Skolt Sámi teacher and that we would take up teaching the language at Sevettijärvi. After he had completed his high school studies in the Kuopio Senior High of Music and Dance, he began his studies at Oulu University. However, he never completed them, and he ended up in Tampere and the local music circles. He never forgot his Skolt Sámi roots and he would sometimes sing in Skolt Sámi, along with Finnish. He would borrow the musical form from various forms of popular music, e.g. the blues, but his scale in singing was wide, and included ditties and ethnic music.

Leo Gauriloff toured with Nils-Aslak Valkeapää ja Paroni Paakkunainen. He played the guitar on Valkeapää's records entitled Sámi eatnan duoddariid (1978) and Davas ja Geassai (1982). Gauriloff was known especially for performing together with Mikko Perkoila. He played on seven of Perkoila's album releases. But he also played with Heikki Lund and Kiti Neuvonen and had a short stint with Piirpauke in 1984.

Gauriloff also played with Jukka Tervo in the guitar duo Tervo & Gauriloff in the 1970s and 1980s, both in clubs and on major festivals in Finland, such as Provinssirock in Seinäjoki in 1980 and in the Suistomaan soittopäivät in Pori in 1981.

Gauriloff also played second guitar in the documentary film called Kurki josta ei tullut lintua (‘The crane that never became a bird’, 1981).

Juice Leskinen Grand Slam released a single with the pseudonym of Trio Jyrkkäkallio, a single with the title “Kissa ja korttipakka” (‘The cat and a pack of cards’) (1985).

Gauriloff composed the music to the play Skoavdnji, which told about the fate of the Skolt Sámi in World War II and which was premiered in the Sámi theatre Beaivváš in 1994. During 1992–1993 Gauriloff worked with Ahaa Teatteri, which is specialized in children's and youth theater.

Around the turn of the millennia Gauriloff moved to Stockholm, where he worked as a musician as well as in day care centers. He died of cancer at the age of 62.
