= Lapua 1976 =

- Directed by: Toni Kurkimäki
- Written by: Tuukka Haapamäki
- Story by: Toni Kurkimäki
- Produced by: Pekka Pohjoispää; Mikko Jokipii
- Starring: Linnea Leino; Konsta Laakso; Hannu-Pekka Björkman; Leo Sjöman; Johanna Koivu; Jussi Lampi; Pirkko Uitto; Timo Teern
- Cinematography: Tero Saikkonen
- Edited by: Tuukka Haapamäki
- Music by: Joona Vainionkulma
- Production company: Blankface
- Distributed by: Finnkino
- Release date: September 1, 2023
- Running time: 113 minutes
- Country: Finland
- Language: Finnish
- Budget: €1.2 million
- Box office: €2,253,480

Lapua 1976 is a Finnish drama film released in 2023, directed by Toni Kurkimäki. The film is based on true events and tells the story of the Lapua Cartridge Factory explosion that occurred in 1976. The main cast includes Linnea Leino, Konsta Laakso, Hannu-Pekka Björkman, Leo Sjörman, Johanna Koivu, Jussi Lampi, Pirkko Uitto, and Timo Teern.

The film's budget was €1.29 million. €300,000 of the financing was raised from businesses. The South Ostrobothnia Fund of the Finnish Cultural Foundation granted €30,000. The project also received financial support from the South Ostrobothnia Regional Council and the city of Lapua. Half a million euros of the budget were funded by a loan from the four owners of the production company Blankface – producers Mikko Jokipii, Pekka Pohjoispää, director Toni Kurkimäki, and screenwriter Tuukka Haapamäki. No production funding was obtained from the Finnish Film Foundation, but the foundation granted €65,000 for distribution and marketing.

Lapua 1976 premiered on September 1, 2023, distributed by Finnkino. The film was the most-watched in Finland during its opening weekend with 21,534 viewers, and the following Friday at noon, the total number of viewers had reached 41,586. By the end of the month, it surpassed 100,000 viewers, making it one of the most-watched Finnish films of the year. The final viewer count exceeded 176,000. It became the most-watched film of all time in South Ostrobothnia.

== Cast ==
- Konsta Laakso — Matti Holma
- Linnea Leino — Kaisa Mäkelä
- Hannu-Pekka Björkman — Aarne Mäkelä
- Leo Sjöman — Juhani Stenfors
- Johanna Koivu — Liisa
- Jussi Lampi — Fire Chief Tapio
- Pirkko Uitto — Rauha Holma

== Reception ==
=== Awards and nominations ===
Lapua 1976 received three nominations at the 2024 Jussi Awards: Best Film, Audience Favorite Actor, and Best Makeup Design.
