= Elina Knihtilä =

Finnish actress (born 1971)

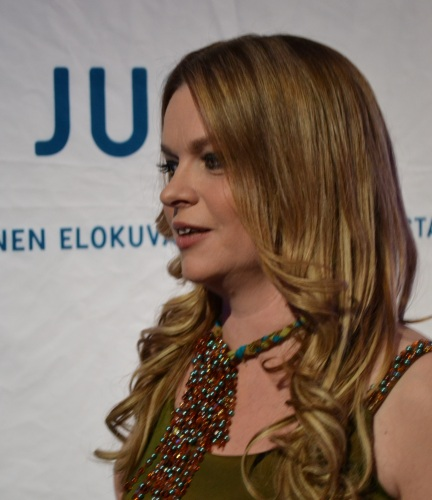
- Knihtilä in 2011
- Born: Maria Elina Knihtilä; 6 June 1971 (age 54); Valkeala, Finland
- Occupations: Actress; acting professor
- Spouse: Tommi Korpela
- Children: 1

Elina Knihtilä (born 6 June 1971) is a Finnish actress.

== Biography ==
Maria Elina Knihtilä was born on 6 June 1971 in Valkeala. Knihtilä has worked for several Finnish theatres, such as the Finnish National Theatre and Q-teatteri, while also having appeared in films and on television. She has received two Jussi Awards; one for a supporting role in the 2008 Heikki Kujanpää film Putoavia enkeleitä and another for a leading role in the 2011 Zaida Bergroth film Hyvä poika. Some of her television work include the comic roles in Läpiveto, Vedetään hatusta and the first season of Putous.

She is a professor of acting at the Helsinki Theatre Academy. She is married to actor Tommi Korpela. Together they have a son.

== Acting credits ==
=== Film ===
Year	Title	Role	Notes	Ref.
1997	Hyvän tekijät			
2002	Hengittämättä & nauramatta			
2004	Lapsia ja aikuisia			
2006	V2 – jäätynyt enkeli			
2006	Matti			
2007	Lieksa!			
2008	Putoavia enkeleitä			
2008	8 päivää ensi-iltaan			
2009	Skavabölen pojat			
2009	Haarautuvan rakkauden talo			
2011	Varasto			
2011	Risto			
2011	Hyvä poika			
2012	Tie pohjoiseen			
2012	Almost 18	Karri's mother		
2015	Wildeye			
2019	Maria's Paradise			
2023	Family Time			
2024	Stormskerry Maja			
2024	100 Litres of Gold			
2025	Rörelser			

=== Television ===
Year	Title	Role	Notes	Ref.
1999	Ihana mies			
2000	Kylmäverisesti sinun			
2002	Tummien vesien tulkit			
2003	Ranuan kummit			
2005	Tahdon asia			
2006	Mogadishu Avenue			
2006–2008	Läpiveto			
2008	Suojelijat			
2008–2009	Hymy pyllyyn			
2009	Ihmebantu			
2010	Putous			
2011	Virta			
2011	Vedetään hatusta			
2011	YleLeaks			
