= Lapua Cartridge Factory explosion =

1976 explosion at a munitions factory in Finland

- Date: 13 April 1976
- Location: Lapua, Finland; 62°58′3″N 23°1′12″E
- Deaths: 40
- Injuries: 60

The Lapua Cartridge Factory explosion (Finnish: Lapuan patruunatehtaan räjähdys) was an industrial disaster that occurred at the State Cartridge Factory in Lapua, Finland on 13 April 1976. It caused the deaths of 40 workers, while 60 people were injured. It remains Finland's worst industrial disaster.

== Explosion ==
The explosion occurred at 07:43, completely destroying the building. The blast was heard up to 20 kilometres (12 miles) away. Most of the injured had been in the factory at the time, but some outside were injured by shrapnel. Of the dead, 35 were women. Fifty-two children under the age of 16 lost at least one parent in the accident.

A strike by telephone engineers meant that there was reduced communication in Lapua at this time, as many of the circuits had not been fully repaired after the winter and the telephone exchange was quickly overwhelmed as relatives phoned searching for information. Rescue efforts were hampered by fires, causing several of the remaining cartridges to explode at sporadic intervals. Beginning at 08:05, the injured began to be transferred to the district hospital in Seinäjoki. Staff at this hospital had already received training in preparation for a major incident, as the town was located at a railway junction. Medical staff were concerned that the clothing worn by victims of the incident could include live ammunition which could be accidentally set off. Military helicopters brought blood supplies from Helsinki for transfusions.

== Response ==
The day of the disaster, the Minister of Defence, Ingvar S. Melin, visited the health centre in the town and the Parliament of Finland observed a minute's silence. The funeral service of all 40 victims took place in the southern park of Lapua Cathedral and was broadcast live on Finnish television. The accident resulted in an enhanced level of crisis support from the Finnish authorities and donations from private individuals came in from across the nation to help.

== Investigation ==
Debris from the scene was taken to the laboratory of the Finnish Defence Forces for analysis. In November 1976 investigators found that the explosion had begun with a machine which dispensed gunpowder and had spread from there, causing a chain reaction. Investigators tested numerous possible scenarios, among them the theory that rust had caused the machine to malfunction or that a foreign object had lodged in it. However, a definitive cause of the explosion was never discovered. Investigators speculated that poor ventilation in the factory had caused a buildup of gunpowder dust, which was then ignited by a spark. The accident resulted in new legislation in the armaments industry which brought in stricter safety measures.

In 1978 legal action against the factory's owners began; this ended in 1982 with all defendants being acquitted. A few weeks after the explosion, the decision was taken to rebuild the factory. It was rebuilt 6 kilometres (3.7 miles) from the town centre. Since 1993, the old factory buildings serve as a cultural center called Vanha Paukku (lit. 'Old Bang').

== See also ==
- Lapua 1976 – a 2023 film based on events
