= Euthanizer =

2017 film

- Film poster
- Directed by: Teemu Nikki
- Written by: Teemu Nikki
- Starring: Matti Onnismaa; Alina Tomnikov
- Music by: Tuomo Puranen; Timo Kaukolampi
- Distributed by: Finnkino
- Release dates: 7 September 2017 (TIFF); 24 November 2017 (Finland)
- Running time: 85 minutes
- Country: Finland
- Language: Finnish
- Budget: €300,000
- Box office: $12,054

Euthanizer (Finnish: Armomurhaaja) is a 2017 Finnish thriller film directed by Teemu Nikki. It was screened in the Contemporary World Cinema section at the 2017 Toronto International Film Festival. It was selected as the Finnish entry for the Best Foreign Language Film at the 91st Academy Awards, but it was not nominated.

== Cast ==
- Matti Onnismaa
- Alina Tomnikov
- Jari Virman
- Heikki Nousiainen
- Ilari Johansson

== See also ==
- List of submissions to the 91st Academy Awards for Best Foreign Language Film
- List of Finnish submissions for the Academy Award for Best Foreign Language Film
