= European Centre of Excellence for Civilian Crisis Management =

Civilian crisis management provider

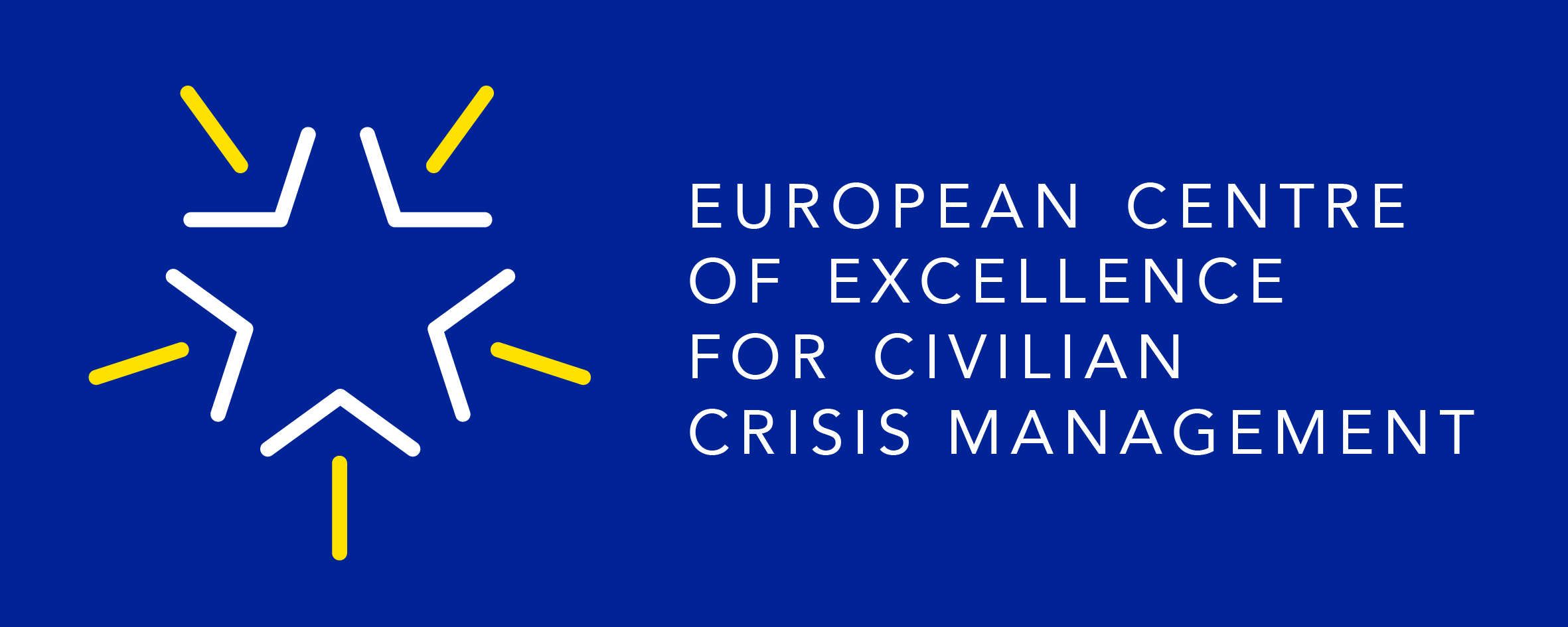
- Abbreviation: CoE
- Formation: 2020
- Director: Johanna Sumuvuori
- Website: www.coe-civ.eu

The European Centre of Excellence for Civilian Crisis Management (CoE) is a member-based association located in Berlin and established in 2020 by the German Federal Foreign Office.

Operating with a focus on EU crisis management missions, which are key civilian instruments of the EU Common Security and Defence Policy (CSDP), the Centre supports its members (EU Member States) in strengthening their national systems, structures, and processes so that they can better contribute to EU civilian crisis management. It does this through offering a platform for informal exchange on key topics related to civilian crisis management, and by providing members with expert advice and consultations.

== History ==
In 2018, the first Civilian CSDP Compact – a key strategic document aimed at strengthening the civilian dimension of EU Common Security and Defence Policy (CSDP) – was proposed. Following the adoption of the Compact by all EU Member States, each Member State drafted a respective National Implementation Plan (NIP), detailing how they intended to fulfil the commitments set out in the Compact. It was at this point that the German Federal Foreign Office proposed the creation of the European Centre of Excellence for Civilian Crisis Management — a membership-based organisation dedicated to supporting all EU Member States to live up to their commitments under the Compact — as Germany's central contribution.

The European Centre of Excellence for Civilian Crisis Management was thus founded in February 2020 by the German Federal Foreign Office, under the auspices of Germany's EU Council Presidency. At this time, Dr Volker Jacoby was appointed as Founding Director. The Centre officially opened in September of the same year, at a ceremony presided over by German Federal Foreign Minister Heiko Maas and attended by representatives from across the EU.

== Organisation ==
Based in Berlin, the CoE consists of a director, contracted staff, seconded staff, advisory board, and chairperson.

The Director, who is appointed by the CoE’s members, has overall responsibility for the Centre’s work. Dr Volker Jacoby served as Founding Director from 2020 to 2025. Former Finnish politician and State Secretary, Johanna Sumuvuori, joined the Centre as Director in April 2025.

Day-to-day operations of the CoE are undertaken by both contracted staff and seconded Senior Advisors, who work together to achieve the CoE's objectives and help maximise the potential of EU Civilian Crisis Management. As of 2025, 14 different nationalities were represented amongst CoE staff. Seconded staff – in the form of Senior Advisors – represent one of the main contributions of CoE members to the Centre, with member governments providing highly qualified experts to work at the Centre for defined periods of time.

In 2025, an Advisory Board was established to provide advice and strategic direction to the Director, on behalf of the Centre’s members. The Advisory Board currently consists of representatives from Germany, Ireland, Sweden, Romania, Portugal, and Finland. Membership of the Advisory Board is limited to the CoE’s member countries, who may serve a term of no more than four years.

Alongside the Advisory Board, the CoE is also supported by a Chairperson. The Centre’s members elect a representative among themselves to serve as Chairperson for a two-year term. The Chairperson is responsible for chairing the annual General Meeting and receives automatic membership of the Advisory Board. The current Chair is Sweden.

== Service Offering ==
The CoE aims to aid members in implementing their national commitments under the Civilian CSDP Compact. Support to members centres around two core offerings.

=== Informal Exchange ===
The CoE offers a platform for informal exchange on key topics related to civilian crisis management. The CoE does this through hosting CoE Civilian CSDP Forums, acting as secretariat for the Informal National Implementation Plan (NIP) Clusters, and facilitating ‘matchmaking’ between members.

By providing an informal platform for strategic exchange, the CoE’s members and Preferred Partners can come together—outside of formal configurations—to share ideas, discuss openly, and drive forward the implementation of the Civilian CSDP Compact. These informal discussions help lay important groundwork ahead of official talks and decisions with the EU Council. In this sense, the CoE also plays the role of an enabler and facilitator of enhanced cooperation between its members, the members’ ministries and institutions, the EU institutions, and CSDP missions.

=== Expert Advice ===
Alongside offering a platform for informal exchange, the CoE also provides members with expert advice and consultations. This includes aiding members in their efforts to develop or implement their NIP, as well as responding to individual requests for support or advice that members may have.

The CoE supports its members through the expert insights of its Senior Advisors, the exchange of good practices in civilian crisis management, targeted consultations to address members’ specific needs or challenges at the national level, as well at the Centre’s online Knowledge Hub. Updated on a regular basis and augmented by the CoE’s own summaries and analyses, the Knowledge Hub functions as a one-stop-shop of resources on civilian crisis management.

== Membership ==
As a member-based association, the primary focus of the CoE is serving its members to strengthen their national civilian crisis management capabilities. With 14 members at the time of its founding, the CoE currently has 25 members, all of which are EU Member States. However, membership of the Centre is not limited solely to EU Member States; in principle, NATO Allies are also invited to join.

Current members
| Member State | Date of Admission |
|---|---|
| Austria | 01.07.2021 |
| Belgium | 01.07.2021 |
| Bulgaria | 01.01.2026 |
| Croatia | 01.01.2024 |
| Cyprus | 25.02.2020 |
| Czech Republic | 01.07.2020 |
| Denmark | 25.02.2020 |
| Estonia | 25.02.2020 |
| Finland | 25.02.2020 |
| France | 25.02.2020 |
| Germany | 25.02.2020 |
| Greece | 25.02.2020 |
| Hungary | 01.07.2020 |
| Ireland | 25.02.2020 |
| Italy | 01.10.2020 |
| Lithuania | 25.02.2020 |
| Latvia | 01.07.2020 |
| Luxembourg | 01.01.2025 |
| The Netherlands | 25.02.2020 |
| Poland | 25.02.2020 |
| Portugal | 25.02.2020 |
| Romania | 01.07.2020 |
| Slovakia | 25.02.2020 |
| Spain | 01.04.2023 |
| Sweden | 25.02.2020 |

In addition to its members, the CoE also works with the European Union, represented by the European External Action Service (EEAS), as its Preferred Partner. This cooperation helps ensure that the CoE’s efforts are aligned with the EU’s vision for civilian crisis management and operationalisation of the Common Security and Defence Policy. NATO, represented by its International Staff, is also a Preferred Partner of the CoE.

== Finances ==
The CoE is financed by a grant from Germany’s Federal Foreign Office, as well as by financial contributions from its members (in the form of membership fees). Members also contribute to the work of the CoE through the secondment of highly qualified, no-cost experts to the Centre in Berlin.

== External links section ==
- CoE Website
- CoE Knowledge Hub
- European External Action Service
- CSDP Fact Sheets on the European Union
- CSDP Federal Foreign Office
