= List of film institutes =

Some notable institutions celebrating film, including both national film institutes and independent and non-profit organizations. For the purposes of this list, institutions that do not have their own article on Wikipedia are not considered notable.

- American Film Institute
- Asia Pacific Film Institute
- Australian Film Institute
- British Film Institute
- Canadian Film Institute
- Danish Film Institute
- Doha Film Institute
- Film and Television Institute of India
- Finnish Film Foundation
- German Film Institute
- Irish Film Institute
- K. R. Narayanan National Institute of Visual Science and Arts
- Mowelfund Film Institute
- Norwegian Film Institute
- Satyajit Ray Film and Television Institute
- Sundance Institute
- Swedish Film Institute
- University of the Philippines Film Institute

== See also ==
- List of film schools and programs
