= Jaakko Gauriloff =

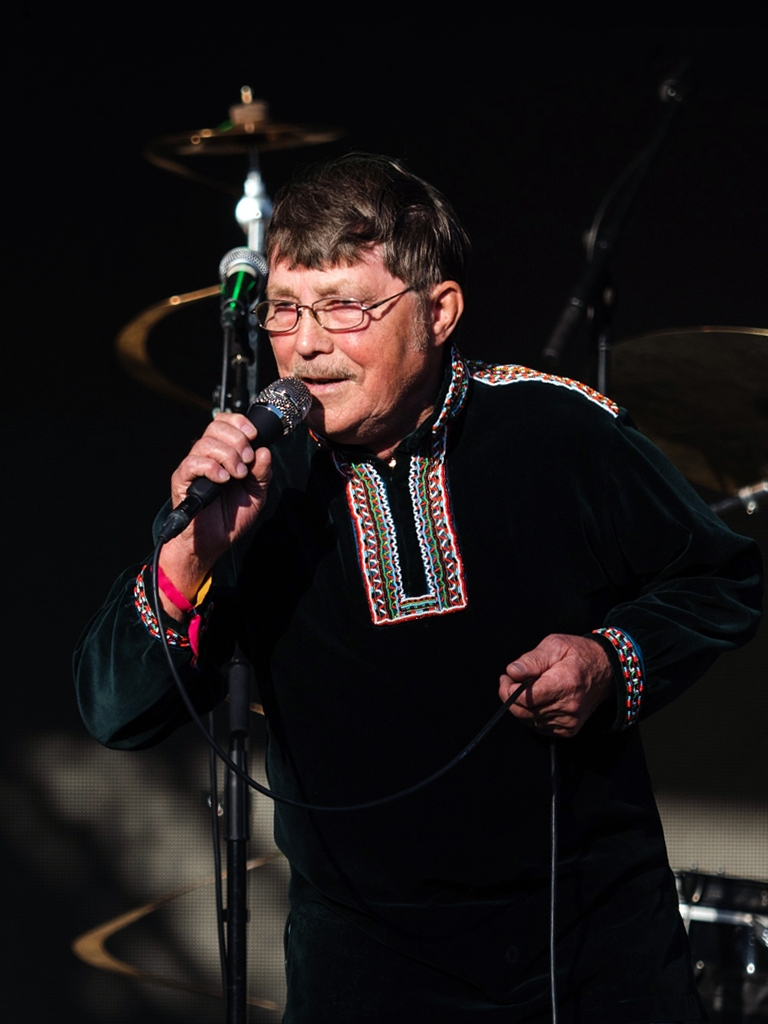
- Jaakko Gauriloff opening the Riddu Riđđu festival in 2018

Background information
- Born: March 1939 (age 87); Suonikylä, Petsamo, Finland
- Genres: Tango, schlager, leuʹdd
- Occupation: Singer
- Years active: 1961–present

Jaakko Gauriloff (born March 1939) is a Skolt Sámi singer. He is regarded as the first artist to have sung popular music in the Skolt Sámi language and is said to be the first Sámi to have published an album in Finland when he published his first record at the end of the 1960s. Although he is mostly known as a schlager singer, he can also sing traditional Skolt Sámi leuʹdds.

== Early life ==
Gauriloff was born in the village of Suonikylä (Skolt Sami: Suõʹnnʼjel), Petsamo Province, Finland, a few months before the Winter War broke out. The family had to be evacuated, and Gauriloff was put in a sledge to which a reindeer was harnessed to pull it. For some reason, the reindeer started, and the sledge and young Gauriloff flipped upside down into a snowbank. In spite of all this, Gauriloff did not even wake up, the sledge was righted, and the first of many evacuation journeys could begin. During the truce period, the family returned home, where Gauriloff listened to Olavi Virta and Tatu Pekkarinen on his grandfather's gramophone. In 1944, after the Continuation War, the Suonikylä Skolts were once again evacuated, this time to the Oulu region. Later on, they were resettled in the Sevettijärvi area of Inari. Gauriloff's parents did not want to settle there, and thus house no. 1 in Sevettijärvi was left empty. In 1956, they received a house in Nilijärvi, near Nellim, where they finally settled down.

Gauriloff became even more interested in music in the 1950s when he listened to records by Olavi Virta and Veikko Tuomi at home. "I learned to sing all those songs, 'Hopeinen kuu' and everything", he later said. When he heard that Olavi Virta was coming to perform in Ivalo, he went there to see him, travelling the 40 km (25 mi) on his bicycle. Having seen the concert, Gauriloff decided to become a singer, too. He started singing at the age of 15 and won a schlager competition that was held in Sodankylä in 1961, which he had entered on a bet with his friends. Three years later, he placed third in the Finnish Schlager Championships.

== Career ==
Gauriloff's success in the Finnish championships was noted by the magazine Suosikki, which ran a story on him, calling him "the James Dean of Nellim" and "the world's northernmost schlager singer", and his popularity went skyrocketing. He began to receive fan mail in Nellim. "It was terrible. I could no longer have my peace and quiet", he says of those times. He was asked to go to Helsinki, and indeed went there, but did not like it, explaining: "I was not cut out for city life. I could not stay there and stare at those apartment buildings".

Back in the north, he was offered a two-week tour in Northern Finland together with Olavi Virta. In 1970, Gauriloff moved to Rovaniemi and founded a band named Kaamos ('Polar Night'). This is when he began to sing in Skolt Sámi.

In the early 1970s, Gauriloff performed on the television for the first time. He also toured with Nils-Aslak Valkeapää and Åsa Blind. The three artists released an album titled De čábba niegut runiidit in 1976. The album got mixed reviews, for example, Helsingin Sanomat did not consider the album to represent genuine Sámi music. In 1981, Gauriloff recorded the world's first reggae single in Saami called "Tanja", which placed second in voting on the popular Finnish television show Levyraati.

From 1984 to 1989, Gauriloff served as the provincial artist for Sámi culture. While in the Soviet Union, he met Ilpo Saastamoinen, who was there on a tour. In 1991, Saastamoinen and Gauriloff visited the Kola Peninsula twice, collecting material, some of which was released on Gauriloff's 1992 album Kuäʹckkem suäjai vueʹlnn. Between 1994 and 1997, the two travelled around the Kola Peninsula recording more music from the Sámi people there for the Kola Sámi Musical Tradition project of the University of Tromsø.

From 1993 to 1999, Gauriloff sang the lead role in the opera trilogy Velho in Äkäslompolo. He has also performed in many countries in Europe as well as in the United States and Japan. In addition to schlager and folk music, Gauriloff has sung on an album titled Finlande in 2002.

In November 2013, the Sámi Parliament of Finland presented Gauriloff with an award on his 50th anniversary as an artist.

== Family ==
Guitarist Leo Gauriloff was Jaakko Gauriloff's younger brother. Film director Katja Gauriloff and master craftsman and artist Heidi Gauriloff are their nieces.

== Discography ==
=== Albums (selected works) ===
- De čábba niegut runiidit (1976)
- Kuäʹckkem suäjai vueʹlnn (1992)
- Luommum mäʹdd (2005)
- Tuõddri tuõkken (2009)

=== Singles ===
- ”Tanja / Laulu Kaisalle” (1981)
- ”Moostaka / Pai maainest säämas” (1985)
