= Suvi West =

Sámi film director

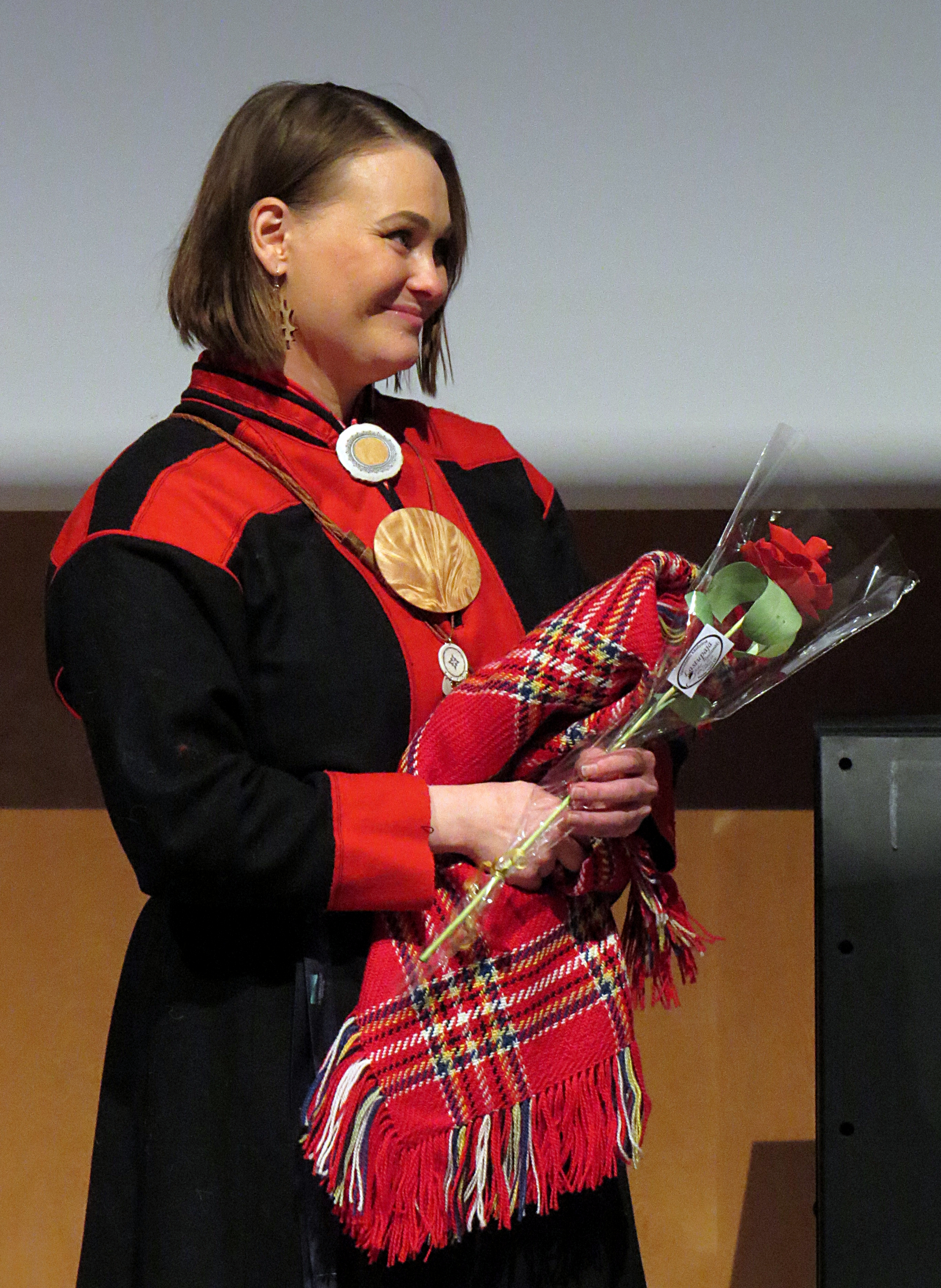
Suvi West (2024)

Suvi West (born 14 January 1982) is a Finnish Sámi director, screenwriter, and television personality.

== Early life and education ==
Suvi West was born in Kittilä and spent her youth in Utsjoki's Outakoski. She received her primary education at Tampere's high school for expressive arts. As a media assistant, she studied in Inari at the film department of the Sámi Regional Education Center from 2003 to 2005.

== Career ==
Suvi West's career progressed while still a student working in Inari for Yle Sami Radio and the Norwegian broadcasting company NRK as a television news and documentaries producer from 2000 to 2007. Still, the strict predetermined format of television work began to make her anxious, and she feared that it would stifle her own film narrative.

Her final work in 2005 was the documentary film Vaikein niistä on rakkaus (The hardest thing is love), which humorously chronicled West's search for a boyfriend. The film was screened in Hollywood and Vancouver International Film Festival.

In addition to making films, she has been the head of the Film Center for Indigenous Peoples from 2009 to 2011 and in the Master's program in documentary film at Aalto University since 2015. After spending ten years in Helsinki, West moved with her family to Utsjoki, as she missed her homeland.

West is especially known for the TV series Märät säpikkät/Njuoska bittut and the music videos shown in it, parodying Finnish hits, with lyrics in Northern Sami.

West directed the 2016 documentary Minä ja pikkusiskoni (Me and my little sister) which was dedicated to her sister.

West directed the documentary Eatnameamet – Hiljainen taistelumme (Eatnameamet - our silent fight), screened in 2021, which tells about the Sámi policy of the Finnish state and the Sámi people's struggle for their culture. The documentary won the Church Media Foundation award and the audience award at the Tampere Film Festival.

== Awards ==
In 2024, Suvi West was awarded the Skábmagovat Prize, an indigenous film award to honor the significant, long-term contributions she has made to the Sámi culture and communities.
