= Skolt of the Year Award =

Linguistic and cultural award in the Skolt community, Finland

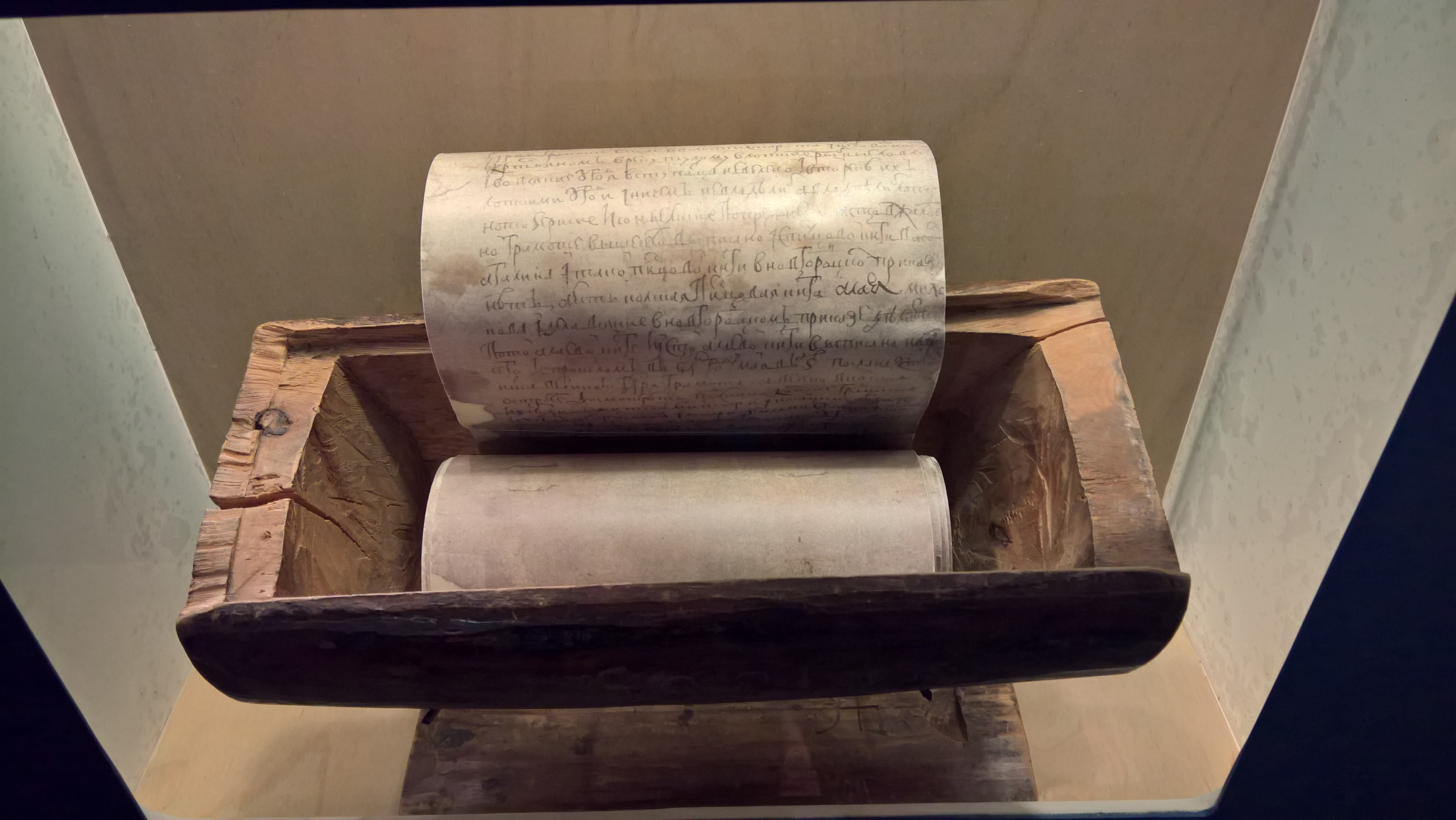
The archive of the Skolt Sámi village of Suõʹnnjel that the National Archives of Finland and the Finnish Sámi Archives nominated for inclusion in UNESCO’s Memory of the World Register for which they won the Skolt of the Year Award in 2015. The document is a replica; the case is the original case.

The Skolt of the Year Award (Skolt Sami: Eeʹjj säʹmmlaž -cistt, Finnish: Vuoden koltta -palkinto) is an annual award founded in 2007. It is awarded to people, groups, organizations, and institutions individually or collectively in recognition of their outstanding linguistic and cultural contributions for the good of the Skolt community. In spite of its name, it is not a requirement that the recipient be a Skolt. The award is administered and voted on by the Skolt Sámi Language and Culture Association Saaʹmi Nueʹtt and the Skolt community council.

== Recipients ==
Year	Recipient(s)	Rationale
2007	Vassi Semenoja (Skolt Sami: Iʹllep Paavvel Vaaʹssež)	for her tireless efforts in creating an orthography for the Skolt Sámi language, for creating pedagogical material once the orthography was created and using it in her classes, for her translations of the Bible and the Skolt epic tale Mannu meäʹcc, and her exceptional leuʹdd skills
2007	Elias Moshnikoff (Skolt Sami: Vääʹsǩ Ellj)	for his work in ensuring that the Skolt leuʹdd tradition will not die out and the leuʹdds will be as accessible to modern-day listeners as they were to his ancestors
2008	Elias Fofonoff (Skolt Sami: Riiggu Eeʹlljaž)	for his selfless service and commitment to the Skolt community in ensuring its survival now and in the future
2008	Helena Semenoff (Skolt Sami: Ååntašǩ Eeʹled)	for her selfless service and commitment to the Skolt community by ensuring that the Skolt culture and community was visible wherever she went, for ensuring that the Skolt culture has been passed on the next generation, and ensuring that future generations will have the same opportunity
2009	Matleena Fofonoff (Skolt Sami: Maadrân Evvan nijdd)	for being the essence and being of what a Skolt woman knows and can do
2010	Satu Moshnikoff (Finnish: Juhon Erkin Satu, later on Skolt Sami: Vääʹsǩ Eeunka Satu)	for all of the invisible work she has put in into turning a spoken language into a written one.
2011	Snowchange Cooperative (Skolt Sami: Muõttmuttâs vuässõskåʹdd, Finnish: Lumimuutos osuuskunta)	for their work on researching the traditional lands of the Skolt Sámi and other Eastern Sámi on the Russian side of the border, for using the land-use study to demonstrate that the lands were not vacant as the mining companies erroneously believed, for publishing their research as the Eastern Sámi Atlas, for building bridges between Finland and Sápmi one person at a time, and for giving back to the Skolt community
2012	Ville-Riiko Fofonoff (Skolt Sami: Läärvan-Oʹlssi-Peâtt-Rijggu-Vääʹsǩ-Rijggu-Ville-Reeiǥaž)	for making our language visible in the education system by being the first Skolt to take his mother tongue portion of the Finnish Matriculation Examination in Skolt Sámi instead of Finnish or Swedish
2013	Yle Sápmi	for consciously producing more content in Skolt and Inari Sámi, constantly recruiting new employees, revamping its programming, strengthening the feeling of belonging amongst our community, etc.
2014	Miika Lehtinen and Markus Juutinen	for creating linguistic and pedagogical material to make learning Skolt Sámi easier for everyone
2015	The National Archives of Finland and the Finnish Sámi Archives	for the nomination and inclusion of the archive of the Skolt Sámi village of Suõʹnnjel in UNESCO’s Memory of the World Register.
2016	Katja Gauriloff	for her documentary Kaisa's Enchanted Forest detailing the friendship between her Skolt great-grandmother and the Swiss writer Robert Crottet
