= Raptures =

2025 Swedish-Finnish film

- Swedish: Rörelser
- Finnish: Valitut
- Directed by: Jon Blåhed
- Written by: Jon Blåhed
- Produced by: Andreas Emanuelsson; Tony Österholm
- Starring: Jessica Grabowsky; Jakob Öhrman
- Cinematography: Mimmo Hildén
- Edited by: Nina Ijäs
- Music by: Rebekka Karijord
- Production companies: Iris Film; Rabbit Films; Filmpool Nord; Sveriges Television
- Distributed by: TriArt Film (Sweden); B-Plan Distribution (Finland)
- Release date: 5 February 2025 (IFFR)
- Running time: 108 minutes
- Countries: Sweden; Finland
- Language: Meänkieli

Raptures (Meänkieli: Liikheitä; Swedish: Rörelser; Finnish: Valitut) is a 2025 Swedish-Finnish drama film directed by Jon Blåhed. The film is based on the Korpela movement, a religious revival movement that arose in the Torne Valley during the 1930s: Most of the dialogue is in Meänkieli, a Finnic minority language. It is the first feature film ever released in Meänkieli.

== Cast ==
- Jessica Grabowsky - Rakel
- Jakob Öhrman - Teodor
- Maria Issakainen - Elsa
- Rebekka Baer - Jorinda
- Hannes Suominen - Valdemar
- Samuli Niittymäki - Toivo Korpela
- Alma Pöysti - Lisa
