= Ria Kataja =

Finnish actress (born 1975)

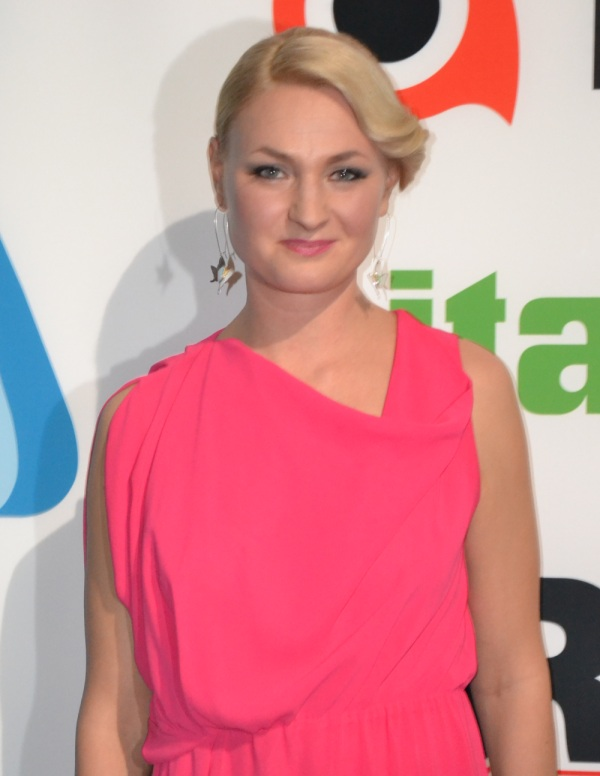
Kataja in 2013

Ria Kataja (born 15 October 1975, in Tampere) is a Finnish actress.

== Career ==
Kataja studied at the Theatre Academy Helsinki. She was seen in a television series Kotikatu since 2003 and in Taivaan tulet since 2007. She has also appeared in several films, such as Black Ice (2007) and Open Up to Me (2013).

== Personal life ==
Ria Kataja was married to actor Tommi Eronen, and together they have two children. The couple divorced in 2012.

== Selected filmography ==
=== In films ===
- Paratiisin lapset (1994)
- Klassikko (2001)
- Nousukausi (2003)
- Musta jää (2007)
- Vares – Pimeyden tango (2012)
- Open Up to Me (2013)
- Family Time (2023)

=== On television ===
- Kaverille ei jätetä (2001)
- Paristo (2002)
- Kuumia aaltoja (2003)
- Kotikatu (2003–2012)
- Akkaa päälle (2006)
- Taivaan tulet (2007, 2010)
