= Family Time (film) =

2023 film by Tia Kouvo

- Official poster
- Finnish: Mummola
- Directed by: Tia Kouvo
- Written by: Tia Kouvo
- Produced by: Jussi Rantamäki; Emilia Haukka
- Starring: Leena Uotila; Tom Wentzel; Ria Kataja; Elina Knihtilä; Jarkko Pajunen; Sakari Topi; Elli Paajanen; Toomas Talikka
- Cinematography: Jesse Jalonen
- Edited by: Okku Nuutilainen
- Production companies: Aamu Film Company; Film i Väst; Vilda Bomben Film
- Distributed by: Aurora Studios; The Match Factory
- Release dates: 20 February 2023 (Berlinale); 10 November 2023 (Finland)
- Running time: 114 minutes
- Countries: Finland; Sweden
- Language: Finnish

Family Time (Finnish: Mummola) is a 2023 comedy-drama film written and directed by Tia Kouvo in her feature directorial debut. Starring Leena Uotila, Ria Kataja, Elina Knihtilä and Tom Wentzel, the film follows an annual family Christmas get-together that sees the usual tensions rise. It is based on Kouvo's 2018 short film of the same name.

The film had its world premiere in the Encounters section of the 73rd Berlin International Film Festival on 20 February 2023. It was chosen as the Finnish entry for Best International Feature Film at the 97th Academy Awards, but was not nominated.

== Cast ==
- Ria Kataja as Susanna
- Elina Knihtilä as Helena
- Leena Uotila as Ella
- Tom Wentzel as Lasse
- Jarkko Pajunen as Risto
- Sakari Topi as Simo
- Elli Paajanen as Hilla
- Toomas Talikka as Kassu

== Production ==
It was reported on 15 September 2021, that Aamu Film Company would produce the film, which later went into production in February and March 2022. Produced by Jussi Rantamäki and Emilia Haukka, the cast includes Leena Uotila, Elina Knihtilä and Ria Kataja. Aamu Film produced the film in co-production with Sweden-based Vilda Bomben Film and Film i Väst. Tom Wentzel, Jarkko Pajunen, Elli Paajanen and Toomas Talikka were selected as supporting cast.

== Release ==
Family Time had its world premiere in the Encounters section of the 73rd Berlin International Film Festival on 20 February 2023. Aurora Studios is in charge of Finland distribution, whereas The Match Factory is handling world sales for the film.

== Reception ==
Fionnuala Halligan of Screen Daily wrote that the film "makes very interesting choices around a fairly conventional structure", concluding, "It's a trope to compare every Finnish director to Aki Kaurismäki, but there is that same deadpan air to Family Time – and a distinctive style that indicates a young director feeling her way to an interesting future." Meredith Taylor of Filmuforia wrote: "Family Time is a mature and memorable debut, Kouvo channelling Bergman, in his obsession to sweat the small stuff. Certainly a name to remember for the future."

== Accolades ==
| Award | Date of ceremony | Category | Recipient | Result | Ref. |
|---|---|---|---|---|---|
| Berlin International Film Festival | 26 February 2023 | Golden Bear Plaque | Family Time | Nominated | |
| Berlin International Film Festival | 26 February 2023 | GWFF Best First Feature Award | Tia Kouvo | Nominated | |

== See also ==
- List of submissions to the 97th Academy Awards for Best International Feature Film
- List of Finnish submissions for the Academy Award for Best International Feature Film
