= Teemu Nikki =

Finnish film director (born 1975)

- Born: 1975 (age 50–51); Sysmä, Finland
- Occupations: Film director, Screenwriter, Film producer
- Years active: 2000s–present

Teemu Nikki (born 1975) is a Finnish self‑taught film director, screenwriter and film producer. He is known for his satirical and socially conscious films, often blending dark humor with humanistic themes. Nikki has directed feature films, short films, and television series, and is regarded as one of Finland's most distinctive contemporary filmmakers.

== Biography ==
Nikki was born in Sysmä, Finland, the son of a pig farmer. He began filmmaking as an autodidact, creating numerous short films that were screened at international festivals. In 2013 he co‑created the surreal youth web series #lovemilla with producer Jani Pösö, which ran for three seasons and won multiple Golden Venla awards.

== Career ==
Nikki's first feature film, Euthanizer (Armomurhaaja, 2017), was selected as Finland's official entry for the 2019 Academy Awards. His third feature, The Blind Man Who Did Not Want to See Titanic (2021), premiered in the Venice Film Festival’s Orizzonti Extra section and won the Audience Award. He has also directed series such as Mister8 and Mental, and continues to collaborate with Jani Pösö on international projects.

== Selected filmography ==
- Euthanizer (2017)
- All Inclusive (short, 2019)
- Nimby (2020)
- The Blind Man Who Did Not Want to See Titanic (2021)
- Death Is a Problem for the Living (2023)
- 100 Litres of Gold (2024)

== Awards ==
- Golden Venla Award for Best Children's and Youth Programme (2013, 2014) for #lovemilla
- Jussi Award for Best Screenplay (2018) for Euthanizer
- Venice Film Festival Audience Award (2021) for The Blind Man Who Did Not Want to See Titanic
- Finnish State Prize for Cinema (2022, with Jani Pösö)
- Multiple international nominations including Cannes, Chicago, and SXSW festivals
