= Katja Gauriloff =

Finnish-Skolt film director

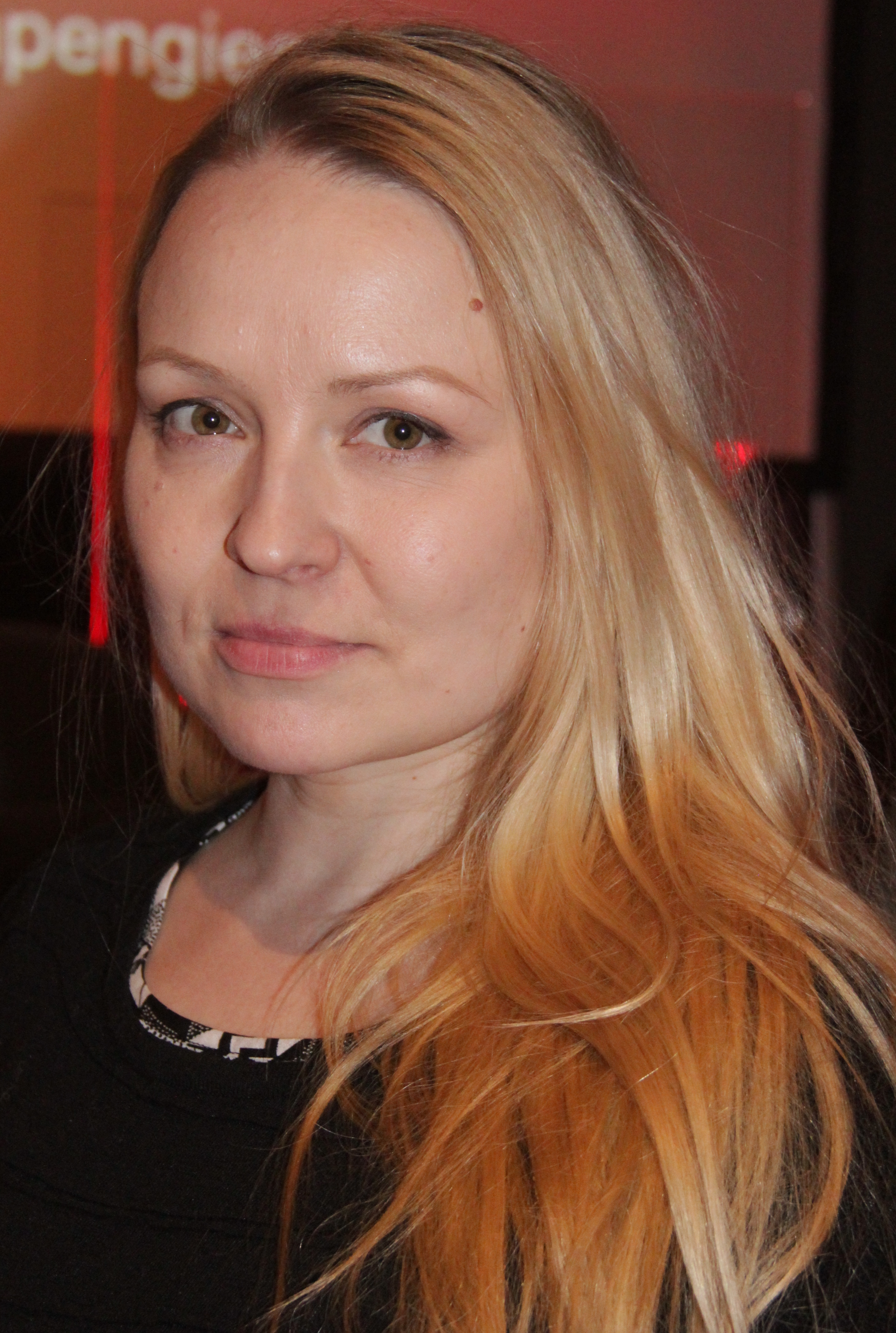
- Katja Gauriloff at the Göteborg Film Festival in February 2017
- Born: 6 December 1972 (age 53); Inari, Finland
- Occupations: filmmaker; director
- Years active: 1998–present

Katja Gauriloff (born 6 December 1972) is a Finnish-Skolt filmmaker, director, and one of the owners of the Finnish production company Oktober.

== Early life and education ==
Gauriloff was born in Inari to a Finnish father and a Skolt Sámi mother. Although Gauriloff is of Skolt Sámi heritage on her mother's side, she grew up in Rovaniemi, far away from the main areas the Skolt community lives in around Lake Inari. As she did not grow up in an environment where Skolt Sámi was spoken and it was not spoken at home, she did not learn the language. In spite of this, Gauriloff has developed a strong identity as a Skolt and has explored her heritage through two of her documentaries. In 2016, the cultural association of the Skolts Saaʹmi Nueʹtt and the Skolt village meeting named her Skolt of the Year for her work on Kaisa's Enchanted Forest.

From 2000 to 2004, she studied directing at the Tampere University of Applied Sciences at the School of Art and Media.

== Professional career ==
Gauriloff began her career in the film industry in 1998.

=== Documentaries ===
Two of Gauriloff's documentaries, A Shout into the Wind and Canned Dreams, have been awarded Finnish State Quality Support for cinema productions (Finnish: elokuvataiteen laatutuki). In 2013, Gauriloff and Joonas Berghäll directed the documentary Voimanlähde about four women and their fight against breast cancer for the Pink Ribbon campaign by the Cancer Foundation of Finland (Finnish: Syöpäsäätiö).

==== A Shout into the Wind ====
A Shout into the Wind was not only Gauriloff's debut film, it was her first film about the Skolt Sámi community. The film documents the struggles of a Skolt family near Sevettijärvi to preserve their traditions in today's world. At first, it was difficult to find funding for the film and it looked like it would not be produced at all. The Finnish Film Foundation and the Promotion Centre For Audiovisual Culture AVEK originally declined requests to fund the movie, but National Geographic gave Gauriloff a seed grant from its All Roads Film Project. The world premiere of A Shout into the Wind was screened at National Geographic's All Roads Film Festival in 2007.

==== Canned Dreams ====
Gauriloff's next documentary, Canned Dreams is a full-length film that follows the making of a can of ravioli through the entire chain of production, concentrating on the individuals contributing to its production. Unusual for this type of documentary, it was even shown in commercial movie theaters in Finland and Denmark. In addition, it was shown at the DocPoint Documentary Movie Festival in Helsinki, Finland and was selected to be shown in the Culinary Cinema programme at the 2012 Berlin International Film Festival.

==== Kaisa's Enchanted Forest ====
Gauriloff's documentary about the friendship between her great-grandmother Kaisa Taisia Gauriloff, a Skolt Sámi storyteller, and the Swiss writer Robert Crottet premiered at the Midnight Sun Film Festival in Sodankylä, Finland in June 2016.

=== Feature films ===
In 2017, it was announced that Gauriloff would be directing her first full-length fiction feature film, the film adaptation of Sofi Oksanen's Baby Jane. The movie premiered on International Women's Day 2019.

== Awards ==
Gauriloff and her movies have won numerous awards both at home in Finland and around the world. 2016 saw Gauriloff win multiple awards, mainly for the movie Kaisa's Enchanted Forest, which was the first Sámi film ever to not only be nominated for a Jussi Award (Best Sound Design and Best Documentary), but to also win one, which it did for Best Documentary. In addition to winning a Jussi, Kaisa's Enchanted Forest was awarded a Golden Dove at Dok Leipzig in the International Competition for Animated Documentary. To round out the year, Gauriloff was named the Skolt of the Year by the Skolt Sámi Language and Culture Association Saaʹmi Nueʹtt and the Skolt community council. In 2017, Gauriloff received the Skábmagovat Prize, an indigenous film award to honor the significant, long-term contributions she has made to the Sámi culture and communities. The same year, Kaisa's Enchanted Forest continued to win awards, this time, the Grand Prix at the Northern Character movie festival in Murmansk.

== Filmography ==
=== Fiction films ===
- The Last Day of His Life, 2003
- Pei'vv paast, 2004
- Baby Jane, 2019
- Jeʹvida, 2023

=== Documentaries ===
- Sincere intentions (Northern Sami: Buorit áigumusat), 2004
- A Shout into the Wind (Finnish: Huuto tuuleen), 2007
- Canned Dreams (Finnish: Säilöttyjä unelmia) 2011
- Voimanlähde, 2013
- Kaisa's Enchanted Forest (Skolt Sami: Mannu mieʹcc Kaiʹssi, Finnish: Kuun metsän Kaisa), 2016
