= Matleena Fofonoff =

Matleena Fofonoff or in Skolt Sami: Maadrân Evvan nijdd Matleena (née Gauriloff, born in 1949 in Rautaperäjärvi, Inari, Finland) is a Skolt master craftsman and artisan, renowned for her work with traditional Skolt crafts such as root basketry, leather crafting with tanned fish skin and beadwork. In addition to craftwork, she has also provided illustrations for books, including the photographs for the Skolt children's book Õhtt eeʹǩǩ Oʹlssee da Såålla mieʹldd (One year with Alex and Sally).

== Award ==
In 2009, it was announced that Fofonoff had been chosen to receive the Skolt of the Year award for that year due to her being the "essence and being of what a Skolt woman knows and can do"
