= Finnish Film Foundation =

Finnish foundation

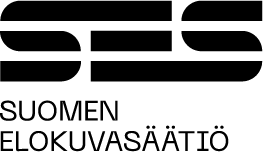
Finnish Film Foundation logo

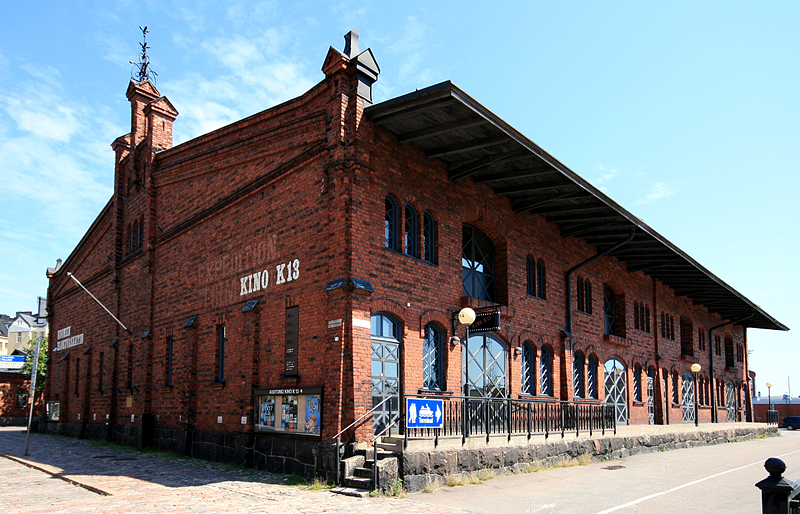
Building of the Finnish Film Foundation in Katajanokka, Helsinki

The Finnish Film Foundation (Finnish: Suomen elokuvasäätiö, Swedish: Finlands filmstiftelse) is an independent foundation with the task of supporting and developing Finnish film production, distribution and exhibition. It is supervised by the Department for Cultural Policy in the Ministry of Education and Culture.

The foundation is supported by grants from the Finnish national lottery. The Finnish Film Foundation’s headquarters with its cinema are located in Katajanokka, Helsinki in a 19th-century harbour terminal.

The foundation is responsible for the export and international promotion of Finnish films. It also grants film production support for individual films, with an aim of supporting "high quality" productions.

The managing director of the foundation is Lasse Saarinen, who replaced Irina Krohn as director in 2016. Saarinen confirmed for a second five-year term which ends July 31 2026. Veronica Vitzthum Lindholm was appointed as the chairwoman of the board to serve three-year term (1 January 2025–31 December 2027).

== See also ==
- Finnish Film Archive
- List of film institutes
