= Nathaniel Mellors =

English artist and musician

Nathaniel Mellors (born December 1974, Doncaster, Yorkshire, England) is an English contemporary artist and musician.

== Education ==
He studied at the University of Oxford's Ruskin Ruskin School of Drawing and Fine Art, the Royal College of Art and the Rijksakademie van beeldende kunsten, Amsterdam.

== Career ==
Mellors makes installations "packed with ad hoc sculpture, psychedelic theatre and absurdist, satirical film". Mellors' output includes installation, sculpture, film and video, music, performance, collage, painting, prints and critical writing.

He has exhibited in numerous group shows, including: 2012 "Radical Languages", Cricoteka, Kraków, 2011 ILLUMInations, 54th Biennale di Venezia, Venice, Italy, 2011 "Un'Expressione Geografica", Fondazione Sandretto Re Rebaudengo, Turin, 2010 British Art Show 7 – In The Days of The Comet, Hayward Gallery, London & UK touring, 2009 Altermodern, Tate Triennial, Tate Britain, London, 2009 Contour 2009, Mechelen, Belgium, 2008 Art Now, Tate Britain, London, and Deep Screen, Stedelijk Museum CS, Amsterdam.

His work in the show Art Now: The Way in Which it Landed, curated by Ryan Gander at Tate Britain in 2008, was Thinking Rock Speaks, an empty speech bubble made of steel attached to a lump of alabaster. Jonathan Griffin in Frieze magazine said that Mellors "gets the last laugh ... Sometimes there really is just nothing to say."

Mellors is represented by The Box, Los Angeles, Los Angeles, Monitor Video & Contemporary Art, Rome, Stigter van Doesburg, Amsterdam & Matt's Gallery, London.

He teaches in the School of Art, Architecture & Design at Leeds Beckett University and the Rijksakademie van Beeldende Kunsten, Amsterdam. He lives and works in Los Angeles, Amsterdam, the Netherlands, London & Yorkshire, UK.

== Projects ==
In 2009 at the South London Gallery, he put on a one night stage version of his film, The Time Surgeon. Jessica Lack in The Guardian described the variety of styles and genres in his films, "skimming off a wide range of artistic references from prog rock to hit TV series The Prisoner, with which he creates brilliantly offbeat installations".

He was represented in the Tate Triennial 2009, Altermodern, by a work Giantbum 2009, based on a story written by him about a party of medieval explorers who lose their way in the body of a giant. The work used film and animatronic heads. Adrian Searle in The Guardian said: "There is a lot of bad acting and declaiming, a succession of dreadful puns, gags about a time-travelling Doctor Poo and Father Shit-mass, and some mock golden showers. Imagine the 120 Days of Sodom redone as panto."

The work was also exhibited at the Stedelijk Museum, Amsterdam, and a variant of it at Centro Cultural Montehermoso in Vitoria-Gasteiz.

In summer 2009, Mellors was commissioned by the BBC to make a short "work of modern art" to introduce the final episode of the cultural history series The Seven Ages of Britain, presented by David Dimbleby and directed by Jonty Claypole. The resultant work The Seven Ages of Britain Teaser featured Dimbleby voicing a silicon mask cast from his own face, alongside actors Gwendoline Christie (as 'The Operator') and Johnny Vivash (as 'Kadmus'). The work was broadcast on BBC One on 21 March 2010.

In 2011, Ourhouse, Mellors' first major solo exhibition in a UK public institution, was presented at the Institute of Contemporary Arts, London. The exhibition included a three-part video installation alongside animatronic sculptures featuring characters from the films.

In September 2011, Mellors selected a playlist of music that inspires him in his work. "Music was my way into art school. I was involved in music from my very early teens – tape collage and improvising with a microphone and an analogue delay pedal with friends. We had no technical ability at all. It was great! The experience of improvising with sound has been a handy touchstone ever since in terms of approaching art making. His playlist includes Sonny Sharrock, GZA, Country Teasers and The Notorious B.I.G.

Mellors was nominated for the Jarman Award in 2012 and was the recipient of the Cobra Art Prize in 2011 and the Contemporary Art Society annual award in 2014. Presented by Turner Prize-winning artist Martin Creed, the £40,000 award goes towards creating a film forming the centrepiece of a 15 month exhibition on the themes of Samuel Beckett and The Theatre of the Absurd.

In 2013, Mellors completed a residency with the Hammer Hammer Museum in Los Angeles, culminating in a 35mm short film titled The Sophisticated Neanderthal Interview. The film toured to Dublin's Temple Bar Gallery in 2014.

== Personal life ==
In 2015, Mellors married Tala Madani, an Iranian-American artist, in Los Angeles. They have two children.

== Solo exhibitions ==
- 2018 "Progressive Rocks", New Museum, New York
- 2017 "The Aalto Natives (with Erkka Nissinen)", Finnish Pavilion, Venice Biennale 2017
- 2016 "Prequel Dump", The Box, Los Angeles
- 2014 "NEW_CAVE_ART_NOW", Stigter van Doesburg, Amsterdam
- 2014 "The Sophisticated Neanderthal Interview", Centre for Contemporary Art Ujazdowski Castle, Warsaw
- 2014 "The Sophisticated Neanderthal Interview", Temple Bar Gallery, Dublin
- 2014 "Nathaniel Mellors – The Sophisticated Neanderthal", art:concept, Paris
- 2014 "INTRUSION#1, Nathaniel Mellors – Ourhouse Episodes 1&2". The View, Switzerland
- 2014 "Nathaniel Mellors", Hammer Museum, Los Angeles
- 2013 "Nathaniel Mellors – Ourhouse", Galway Arts Centre, Ireland
- 2013 Nathaniel Mellors & Jimmy Joe Roche, Baltimore Museum of Art (2-person show)
- 2012 Recent Collaborations Before THE SAPROPHAGE, MONITOR, Rome
- 2012 "Ourhouse Episode 3, 'The Cure of Folly'", Malmö Konsthall, Sweden
- 2012 "Ourhouse E3 feat. BAD COPY", Salle de Bains, Lyon
- 2012 Ourhouse E3 feat. BAD COPY, Matt's Gallery, London
- 2011 The Nest, Cobra Museum, Amstelveen Cobra Museum Exhibitions (Dutch)
- 2011 Artist's Statement Series: Nathaniel Mellors & Chris Bloor – :HYPERCOLON:, SMART Project Space, Amsterdam
- 2011 Nathaniel Mellors: Ourhouse, I.C.A., London
- 2010 Ourhouse, De Hallen, Haarlem
- 2009 Giantbum, Stedelijk Museum Bureau Amsterdam
- 2009 Giantbum, Monterhermoso, Vitoria, Spain
- 2009 Giantbum, Lombard-Freid Projects, New York
- 2009 The Time Surgeon, South London Gallery
- 2006 Hateball, Alison Jacques, London
- 2005 Hateball, The Collective, Edinburgh
- 2004 Profondo Viola, Matt's Gallery, London
- 2001 Black Gold, Matt's Gallery, London

== Music projects ==
In 2002, Mellors co-founded Junior Aspirin Records, a not-for-profit record label releasing music by artists in limited editions. Mellors plays bass in the art-rock group Skill 7 Stamina 12 with Dan Fox, Ashley Marlowe and Maaike Schoorel, and has also released music with Toilet, God in Hackney, Mysterius Horse and under his own name.

- 1989 The New Sharp (with Simon Johns)
- 1990 – 1991 Autobutcher (with Simon Johns, Chris Barter, Ashley Marlowe and Grant Newman)
- 1991 – 1993 Corridor (with Chris Barter, Ashley Marlowe and Grant Newman)
- 1992 – 1999 Conemelt (with Ashley Marlowe and Grant Newman)
- 2002 Prince Lightning
- 2002 – present Junior Aspirin Records
- 2002 – 2007 Skill 7 Stamina 12 (with Dan Fox, Ashley Marlowe and Maaike Schoorel)
- 2003 – present God in Hackney (with Andy Cooke, Dan Fox and Ashley Marlowe)
- 2006 Mysterius Horse (with Dan Fox)
- 2008 – present Advanced Sportswear (with Dan Fox and Ashley Marlowe)

== Collections ==
- Hammer Museum, Los Angeles.
- De Hallen, Haarlem.
- Stedelijk Museum, Amsterdam.
- FRAC Occitanie Montpellier.
- Tate.
- Preston Harris Museum.
- National Gallery of Victoria, Melbourne.
