= W.O.A.R./W.O.A. =

EP (split) by Country Teasers/Ezee Tiger
- Released: December 1, 2008
- Recorded: March 23, 2006 (W.O.A.R.)/unknown (W.O.A.)
- Genre: Art punk, garage punk
- Length: 41:22
- Label: Holy Mountain Records

Country Teasers/Ezee Tiger chronology
The Empire Strikes Back (2006)	W.O.A.R./W.O.A. (2008)

W.O.A.R./W.O.A. is a split 12" record released on Portland, Oregon label Holy Mountain.

The a-side of the album features twelve short songs by Scottish art punk outfit The Country Teasers. Though the sleeve art, song format and titles are consistent with Ben Wallers' work under the name The Rebel, the music here is credited to Leighton Crook, Sophie Politowicz and Wallers.

The b-side contains two songs by Michigan musician and one-man band Anthony Petrovic (also of The Hospitals) under the name Ezee Tiger.

== Track listing ==
=== Side one: W.O.A.R. by Country Teasers ===
1. "Bung Oats (Not To Be Born)" - 2:47
2. "C&W Song (Look At That Man!)" - 1:46
3. "Far Triff (Your All a Bunch of Cunts)" - 0:51
4. "Grand Entry and Exit of Man w/Pasta" - 4:33
5. "Saddam Hussein" - 0:35
6. "Space" - 1:43
7. "Pixels" - 0:23
8. "Food + Sleep" - 2:01
9. "Bad Birthday Ripped Off By The Devil" - 0:40
10. "Open Country" - 5:02
11. "Rich Tape" - 1:33
12. "Bury the Male Nurse's Dead Corpse" - 1:34

=== Side two: W.O.A. by Ezee Tiger ===
1. "The End (From All of a Sudden)" - 5:58
2. "Crush Medley (A Stupid Rock Opera Kinda)"- 3:26

== Country Teasers personnel ==
- Leighton Crook on instruments
- Sophie Politowicz on instruments
- B.R. Wallers on instruments, vocals and production

== Ezee Tiger personnel ==
- Anthony Petrovic
