= Finnish pavilion =

Venice Biennale national pavilion

Coordinates: 45.4293°N 12.3585°E

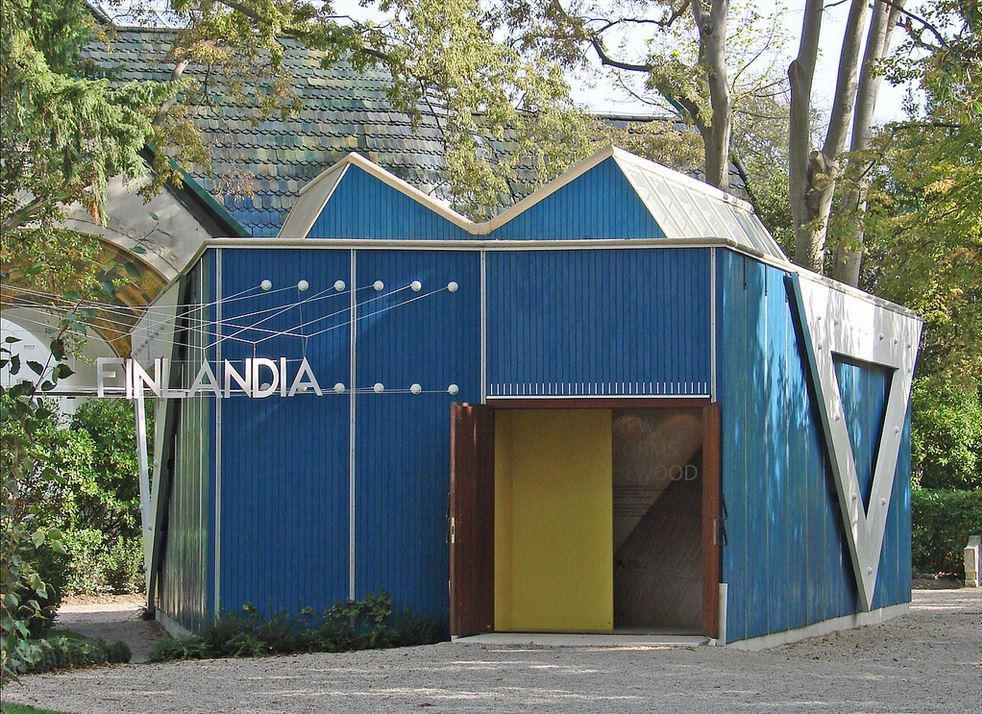
The Finnish pavilion

The Finnish pavilion houses Finland's national representation during the Venice Biennale arts festivals in addition to the Nordic pavilion shared with Sweden and Norway.

== Background ==
The Venice Biennale is an international art biennial exhibition held in Venice, Italy. Often described as "the Olympics of the art world", participation in the Biennale is a prestigious event for contemporary artists. The festival has become a constellation of shows: a central exhibition curated by that year's artistic director, national pavilions hosted by individual nations, and independent exhibitions held throughout Venice. The Biennale's parent organisation also runs regular festivals in other arts: architecture, dance, film, music and theatre.

Outside the central international exhibition, individual nations produce their own shows, known as pavilions, as their national representation. Nations that own their pavilion buildings – such as the 30 housed in the Giardini – are responsible for their own upkeep and construction costs as well. Nations without dedicated buildings create pavilions in venues throughout the city.

Since 2013, the Frame Contemporary Art Finland foundation has commissioned and produced exhibitions for the Finnish pavilion as part of its mission to promote contemporary Finnish art.

== Building ==
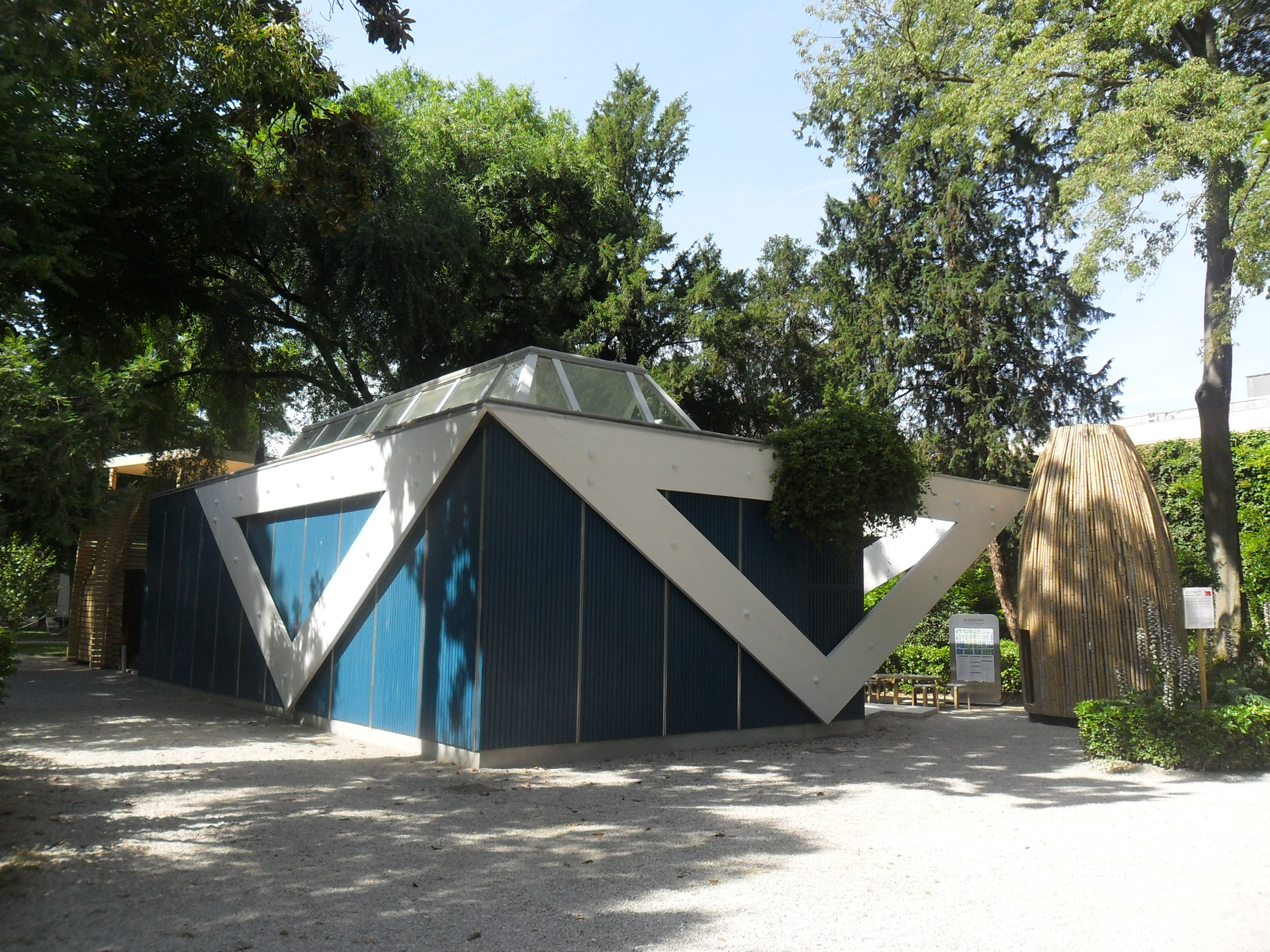
The white and blue pavilion is built primarily of wood.

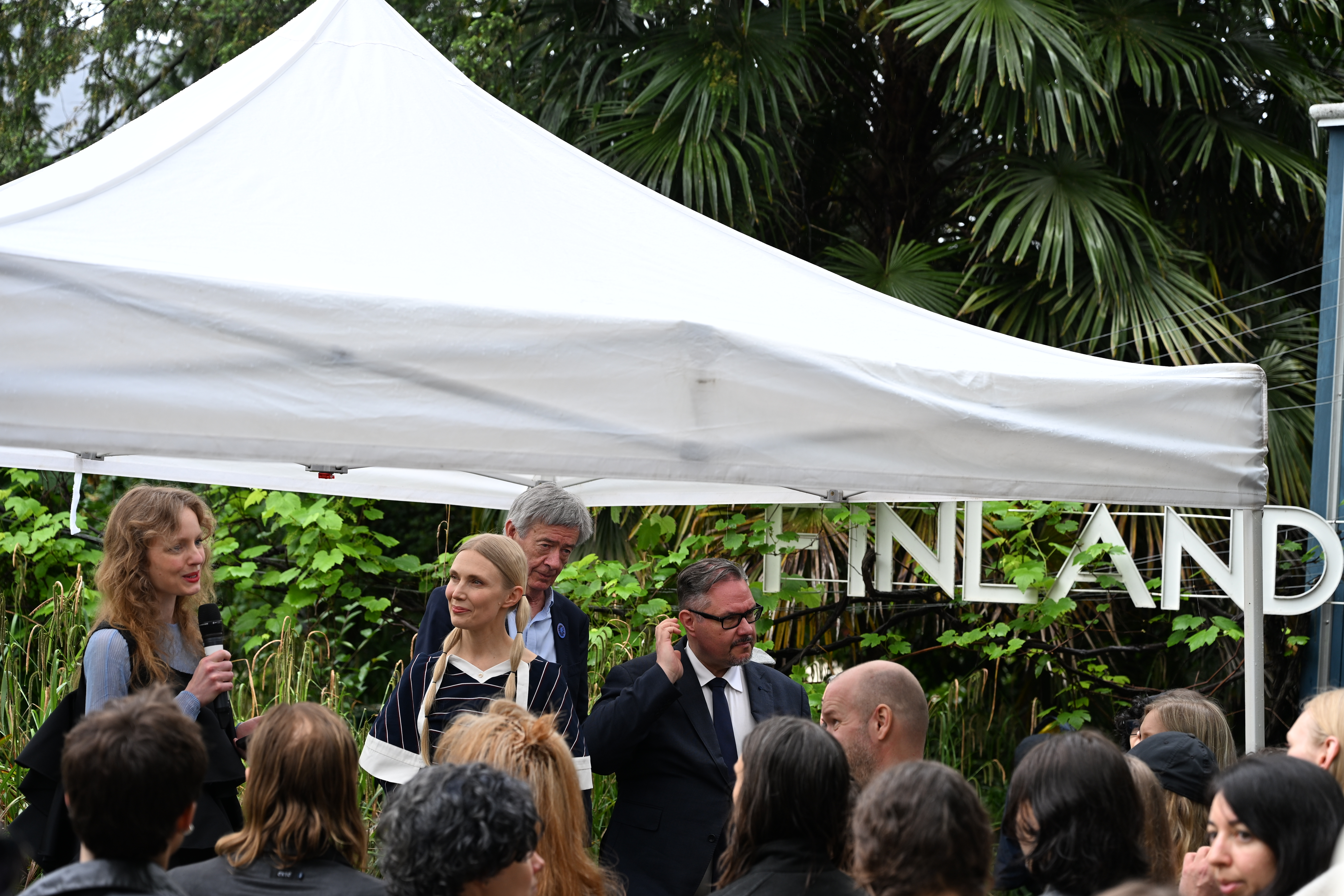
Stefanie Hessler and Jenna Sutela at the opening of the Finnish pavilion

The pavilion, designed by Alvar Aalto and Elissa Aalto, was built between 1955 and 1956. It was originally designed as a temporary space for the Finnish national exhibition at the 28th Venice Biennale, but it remains in use today. It is the only Alvar Aalto building in Italy that was completed during Aalto's lifetime.

After the shared Nordic pavilion was completed in 1962, the building was lent to other countries, including Italy, Argentina, Portugal, and Iceland. It has been used again by the Finnish national exhibition since 2007.

The building is constructed primarily of wood, a challenging material for the humid and flood‑prone Venice. The pavilion is fully coated and painted, providing a layer of protection from sunlight and water. This is considered a contributing factor to the endurance of the wooden building in the hostile environment.

The building was restored by Fredrik Fogh between 1976 and 1982, with a further restoration taking place in 1993. The exhibition at the pavilion for the 19th Venice Biennale of Architecture in 2025 was titled The Pavilion – Architecture of Stewardship and used the pavilion itself as an example of architecture as a collaborative task: architects, engineers, construction workers, maintenance staff, cleaners, and other roles all play a part in the creation and upkeep of any building over its lifetime.

== Representation by year ==
=== Art ===
- 2005 — Jaakko Heikkilä
- 2007 — Maaria Wirkkala
- 2011 — Vesa‑Pekka Rannikko (curator: Laura Köönikkä)
- 2013 — Antti Laitinen, Terike Haapoja (curators: Mika Elo, Marko Karo, Harri Laakso)
- 2015 — IC‑98 – Visa Suonpää, Patrik Söderlund (curator: Taru Elfving)
- 2017 — Erkka Nissinen, Nathaniel Mellors (curator: Xander Karskens)
- 2019 — Miracle Workers Collective
- 2021 — Pilvi Takala
- 2024 — Pia Lindman, Vidha Saumya, Jenni‑Juulia Wallinheimo‑Heimonen (curators: Yvonne Billimore, Jussi Koitela)
- 2026 — Jenna Sutela (curator: Stefanie Hessler)

== Bibliography ==
- Russeth, Andrew (April 17, 2019). "The Venice Biennale: Everything You Could Ever Want to Know". ARTnews. Archived from the original on April 20, 2019.
- Volpi, Cristiana (2013). "Finland". In Re Rebaudengo, Adele (ed.). Pavilions and Garden of Venice Biennale. Rome: Contrasto. p. 187. ISBN 978-88-6965-440-4.
