= Sámi pavilion =

Art exhibition in Venice, Italy

The Sámi pavilion is an art exhibition in the Nordic pavilion of the 2022 Venice Biennale.
