= Satan Is Real Again, or Feeling Good About Bad Thoughts =

Studio album by Country Teasers
- Released: 1996
- Recorded: July 1995
- Genre: Garage punk; post-punk; cowpunk
- Length: 42:41
- Label: Crypt
- Producer: Gordon Kerr

Country Teasers chronology
The Pastoral - Not Rustic - World of Their Greatest Hits (1995)	Satan Is Real Again, or Feeling Good About Bad Thoughts (1996)	Back to the Future, or Brideshead Revisitted Revisitted (1998)

Professional ratings
Review scores
Source	Rating
AllMusic	4/5 stars
Melody Maker	favourable

Satan Is Real Again, or Feeling Good About Bad Thoughts, released in 1996, is the second album by Country Teasers.

== Track listing ==
All songs written by B.R. Wallers except where noted

=== Side one ===
1. "The Wide-Open Beaver of Nashville" – 2:16
2. "Black Change" – 1:30
3. "Panty Shots" – 4:32
4. "It Is My Duty" – 6:53
5. "Devil on My Back" – 1:20
6. "Little Black Clouds" – 2:55
7. "Lies" – 3:21

=== Side two ===
1. "Thank You God for Making Me an Angel" (Wallers/Joy Division) – 2:38
2. "Cripples" – 2:30
3. "Some Hole" – 2:12
4. "Don't Like People" – 3:09
5. "Country Fag" – 1:41
6. "Satan Is Real Again" – 4:46
7. "These Things Shall Pass" (Stuart Hamblen) – 2:58

== Trivia ==
The track "Thank You God for Making Me an Angel" is largely based on the Joy Division track "Digital"

== Personnel ==
- B. R. Wallers - Singing & Guitar
- Alan. K. Crichton - Guitars
- Simon W. Stephens - Bass
- Eck King - Drums
- Richard Greenan - Guitar
- Mark Deas - Production (10 & 12)
- John Morgan - Guitar (10)
