= Secret Weapon Revealed at Last =

Secret Weapon Revealed at Last, or Full Moon Empty Sportsbag

Studio album by Country Teasers
- Released: 2003
- Recorded: February 2, 2000 – February 5, 2003
- Genre: Rock
- Length: 54:16 (CD)
- Label: In the Red
- Producer: The Rebel, Amir Shoat

Country Teasers chronology
Science Hat Artistic Cube Moral Nosebleed Empire (2002)	Secret Weapon Revealed at Last, or Full Moon Empty Sportsbag (2003)	Live Album (2005)

Professional ratings
Review scores
Source	Rating
AllMusic	2.5/5 stars
Pitchfork Media	3.1/10

Secret Weapon Revealed at Last is the fourth studio album by Country Teasers.

Finding it increasingly difficult for the entire band to congregate to perform or record, the album contains several older songs written between 1997 and 1998 and recorded during the winter of 2002. The liner notes state that "Some members of the group were not present at the recordings".

== Critical reception ==
The Times wrote that "the Country Teasers' determined pursuit of needling, off-the-cuff unpleasantness eventually wheedles the listener, against their will, into something approaching a state of grace". In an article on "rant rock" for Spin, Chuck Eddy, described the album is a "belligerent pile of four-track crank catcalls".

== Track listing ==
All songs written by Ben Wallers.

1. "Success" – 3:17
2. "Hairy Wine 2" – 3:44
3. "Young Mums Up for Sex" – 3:00
4. "Deaths" – 4:38
5. "TODTTL" – 3:15
6. "Life Is a Rehearsal" – 4:22
7. "Full Moon Empty Sportsbag" – 1:05
8. "Boycott the Studio" – 3:07
9. "Wizmo!" – 4:01
10. "Please Stop Fucking Each Other" – 4:13
11. "Man v Cock" – 3:35
12. "Sandy" – 6:48
13. "EHWPSA" – 9:11

== Personnel ==
- B.R. Wallers – Guitar, Vocals, Other
- S.W. Stephens – Bass
- A.J.R. Mackinven – Guitar
- R.A.McNeill – Guitar, Synthesizer
- L.J.Worthington – Drums
- Kaanan Tupper – Bass
- Joe Patt – Drums
- Leighton Crook – Drums
- Sophie Politowicz – Drums
