= The Pastoral – Not Rustic – World of Their Greatest Hits =

The Pastoral - Not Rustic - World of Their Greatest Hits

Studio album by Country Teasers
- Released: 1995
- Recorded: 1994, Toe Rag Studios, London
- Genre: Post-punk
- Length: 23:47 (LP); 28:20 (CD)
- Label: Crypt Records
- Producer: Liam Watson

Country Teasers chronology
The Pastoral - Not Rustic - World of Their Greatest Hits (1995)	Satan Is Real Again, or Feeling Good About Bad Thoughts (1996)

Professional ratings
Review scores
Source	Rating
AllMusic	1.5/5 stars

The Pastoral – Not Rustic – World of Their Greatest Hits is the debut album by Country Teasers. The compact disc release adds "Anytime, Cowboy" and "No.1 Man" from the Crypt single, which was recorded in Edinburgh, Scotland in 1993.

== Track listing ==
All songs written by B.R. Wallers except where noted

=== Side one ===
1. "How I Found Black-Brodie" – 1:34
2. "Only My Saviour" – 2:48
3. "Bitches' Fuck-Off" – 1:46
4. "O, Nurse!" – 1:12
5. "Anytime, Cowboy #2" – 2:23

=== Side two ===
1. "Mosquito" – 2:35
2. "Drove a Truck" – 2:17
3. "Been Too Long" – 3:01
4. "Black Cloud Wandering" (Lerner and Loewe) – 3:48
5. "Stand by Your Man" (Billy Sherrill/Tammy Wynette) – 2:23

== CD version ==
1. "How I Found Black-Brodie" – 1:34
2. "Only My Saviour" – 2:48
3. "Bitches' Fuck-Off" – 1:46
4. "O, Nurse!" – 1:12
5. "Anytime, Cowboy #2" – 2:23
6. "Mosquito" – 2:35
7. "Drove a Truck" – 2:17
8. "Been Too Long" – 3:01
9. "Black Cloud Wandering" – 3:48
10. "Stand By Your Man" – 2:23
11. "Anytime, Cowboy" – 2:01
12. "Number 1 Man" – 2:32

== Personnel ==
- B. R. Wallers - Singing, Guitar & Drums
- Alan. K. Crichton - Guitars
- Simon W. Stephens - Bass
- George Miller - Drums (on "Anytime, Cowboy" and "No.1 Man")
