= Science Hat Artistic Cube Moral Nosebleed Empire =

Compilation album by Country Teasers
- Released: 2002
- Recorded: 1991 – 1996
- Genre: Post-punk, noise rock, garage punk
- Length: 55:08 (CD)
- Label: In the Red Records

Country Teasers chronology
Destroy All Human Life (1999)	Science Hat Artistic Cube Moral Nosebleed Empire (2002)	Secret Weapon Revealed at Last, or Full Moon Empty Sportsbag (2003)

Professional ratings
Review scores
Source	Rating
Allmusic	link

Science Hat Artistic Cube Moral Nosebleed Empire is an album by Country Teasers which compiles songs from seven-inch singles with home recordings and studio out-takes.

== LP track listing ==
All songs by B.R. Wallers except where noted

=== Side one ===
1. "Getaway!"
2. "I Get Hard"
3. "I'm a New Person, Ma'am"
4. "We Had to Tear This Motherfucker Up" (Ice Cube)
5. "Kill!"
6. "$4.99"
7. "Happy Feet"
8. "No Limits" (2 Unlimited)
9. "Loose Tongues Get into Tight Places"
10. "Thank God I'm Gone"

=== Side two ===
1. "Let's Have a Shambles"
2. "After One Thing"
3. "So Lonely"
4. "Compressor"
5. "Can't Sing"
6. "Tights"
7. "Go Down Mighty Devil"
8. "Some Hole"
9. "Postman Pak and His Lazy Black & White Cunts"
10. "Kenny Malcolm on Smack"

=== Side three ===
1. "Good Pair of Hands"
2. "Demon Eyes"
3. "Trendy Mick Fleetwood's Fast Tail"
4. "Son of Treble-Faced Man"
5. "Only Whittlin'"
6. "Hat on the Bed"
7. "Julie Halard"
8. "Only a Woman"
9. "Sickening Lack"
10. "Prettiest Slave on the Barge"
11. "Retainer"

=== Side four ===
1. "Mollusc in Country" (Mark E. Smith/Craig Leon)
2. "Tough Luck on Jock"
3. "Treble Life #2"
4. "The Last Bridge of Spencer Smith"
5. "Adam Wakes Up"
6. "Small Shark in Tiny Pool"
7. "Secrets in Welsh"
8. "Prettiest Slave on the Barge (reprise)"

== CD track listing ==
1. "Compressor" – 1:23
2. "Getaway!" – 1:39
3. "Some Hole" – 3:02
4. "I'm a New Person, Ma'am" – 4:13
5. "$4.99" – 2:25
6. "Mollusc in Country" – 1:25
7. "Happy Feet" – 2:51
8. "No Limits" – 1:52
9. "Hat on the Bed" – 2:10
10. "Secrets in Welsh" – 4:18
11. "Adam Wakes Up" – 2:05
12. "Loose Tongues Get into Tight Places" – 2:23
13. "After One Thing" – 2:20
14. "Treble Life #2" – 1:22
15. "The Last Bridge of Spencer Smith" – 4:54
16. "Can't Sing" – 1:18
17. "We Had to Tear This Motherfucker Up" – 2:12
18. "Only Whittlin'" – 1:59
19. "Postman Pak and His Lazy Black & White Cunts" – 4:07
20. "Tough Luck on Jock" – 7:10
