= Destroy All Human Life =

Studio album by Country Teasers
- Released: February 23, 1999
- Recorded: August 19–21, 1998
- Genre: Post-punk
- Length: 45:09
- Label: Fat Possum Records

Country Teasers chronology
Back to the Future, or Brideshead Revisitted Revisitted (1998)	Destroy All Human Life (1999)	Science Hat Artistic Cube Moral Nosebleed Empire (2002)

Professional ratings
Review scores
Source	Rating
AllMusic	4.5/5 stars
The Stranger	3/4 stars

Destroy All Human Life is a studio album by Country Teasers. It was recorded by Fred Baggs.

== Critical reception ==
Exclaim! wrote that the album "rides the fine line between melancholy and mediocrity." SF Weekly wrote that Country Teasers' "smirking delivery reveals the lyrics to be an indiscriminate jest." The Dallas Observer wrote that Destroy All Human Life "turns down the flailing energy for a much more subdued murk owing more to mid-fi Royal Trux-y rambling than anything else."

== Track listing ==
All songs written by B.R. Wallers except where noted

=== Side one ===
1. "Reynard the Fox" – 5:10
2. "Golden Apples" – 3:28
3. "David I Hope You Don't Mind" – 5:07
4. "Hairy Wine" – 3:30
5. "Deliverance from Misrule" (Trad. Arr. Country Teasers) – 2:22
6. "Almost Persuaded" (Billy Sherrill/Glenn Sutton) – 3:34

=== Side two ===
1. "Go Away from My Window" (Trad. Arr. Country Teasers) – 4:43
2. "Brown Jews Etc" – 4:07
3. "Women and Children First" – 4:22
4. "Come Back Maggy" – 3:13
5. "Song of the White Feather Club Secretary" – 5:33

== Personnel ==
- B. R. Wallers — Singing & Guitar, Percussion (5)
- S. W. Stephens — Bass
- A. J. R. MacKinven — Slide & Rhythm Guitar, Charm Pet (1)
- L. Worthington — The Drums, Lead Guitar (5,10)
