= McKinven =

McKinven is a surname of Scottish origin. Notable people with the surname include:

- John McKinven (1941–2014), Scottish footballer
- Ron McKinven (1936–2022), Scottish footballer
- Walker McKinven (born 1989), American baseball coach

== See also ==
- Alastair MacKinven (1971–2025), British visual artist
