= Helsinki Theatre Academy =

Academy of the University of the Arts Helsinki

Coordinates: 60.1811°N 24.9587°E

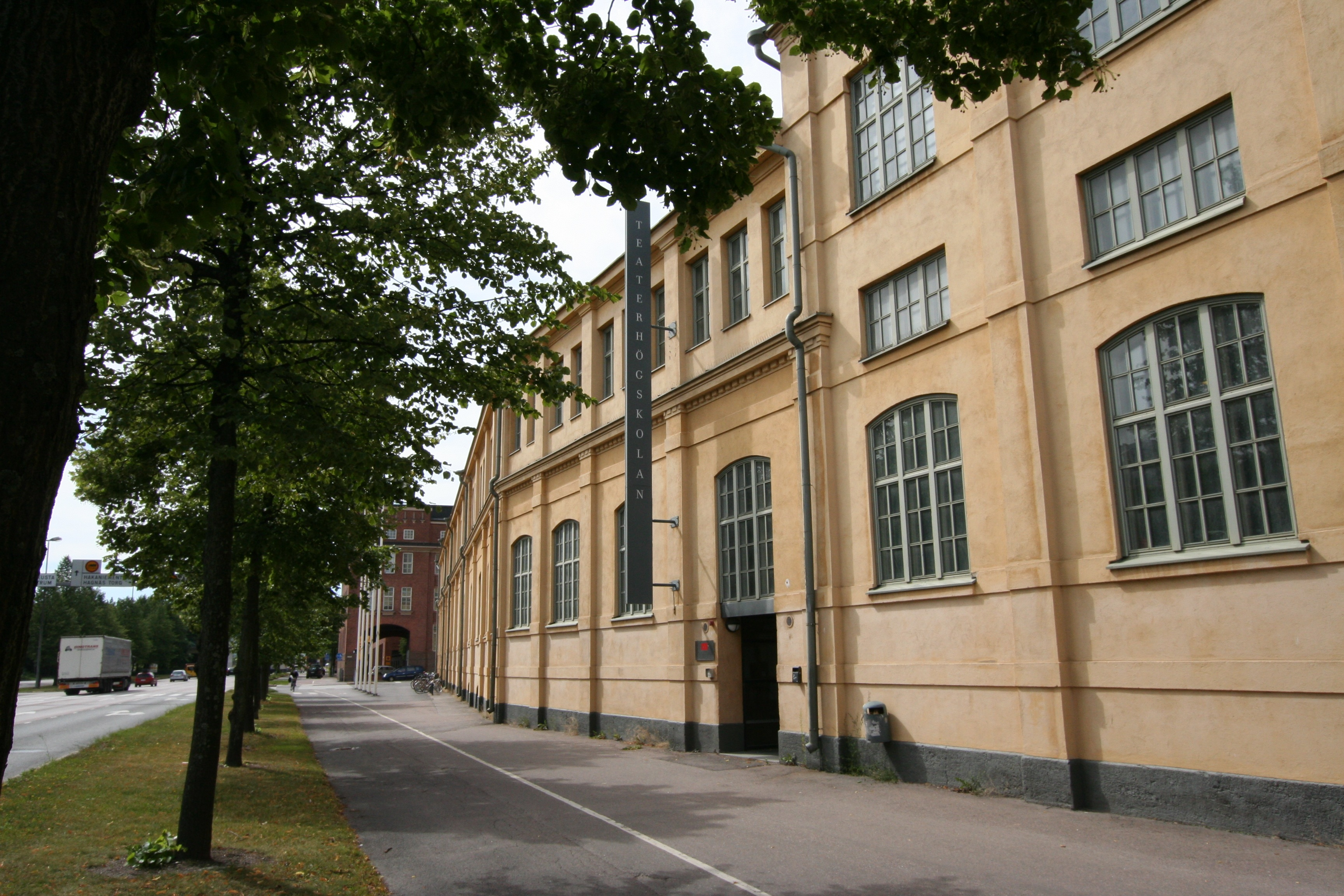
Theatre Academy building

The Theatre Academy (Finnish: Teatterikorkeakoulu, Swedish: Teaterhögskolan) is one of the three academies of the University of the Arts Helsinki and offers education in theatre and dance. It is Finland's largest education provider in its field and, with the exception of acting, the only one in the country. In September 2014, there were 349 students at TeaK: 315 in the bachelor and master programmes, and the remaining 34 were studying for a licentiate or doctoral degree.

The current dean of the Theatre Academy is Maarit Ruikka, and the vice-deans are Leena Rouhiainen and Ari Tenhula.

The degrees offered by the Theatre Academy are the bachelor, master, licentiate and doctor of arts (theatre/dance) in the fields of Acting in Finnish or Swedish, Directing, Dramaturgy, Dance (dancer and choreographer), Lighting and Sound Design and Theatre and Dance Pedagogy. In addition, the academy is responsible for continuing education in its field. TeaK premieres around 40 productions each academic year. The performances are open to the public.

== Alumni activities ==
The alumni of the Theatre Academy include previous students who have completed a degree in theatre and dance or a comparable degree at the Theatre Academy or one of its predecessors. They can join the academy's alumni association which, among its other activities, serves as a link between alumni. Current and past staff members of the Theatre Academy and its predecessors can also join the alumni association.

Since 2011, the association has awarded the Alumnus/Alumna of the Year award to an artist, pedagogue or other professional for outstanding achievement in theatre. The first recipient of the award was Seela Sella (2011). In 2012, the award was given to Pauliina Feodoroff and Milja Sarkola, and in 2013, to Hanna Kirjavainen and Miko Jaakkola.

== History ==
=== Before the Theatre Academy ===
In the period from 1904–1940, Finnish-speaking actors were trained by the school of the Finnish National Theatre and by the private stage school Suomen Näyttämöopisto. Suomen Teatterikoulu (the Finnish Theatre School) was founded in 1943. The school's higher education department started offering director and dramaturg training in 1962.

Swedish-language actor training began considerably earlier than Finnish-language programmes. In 1866–1868, training was organised in conjunction with Nya Teatern, Finland's first theatre school. In 1908, Svenska Teaterns elevskola was founded as part of Svenska Teatern (the Swedish Theatre). It later changed its name to Svenska Teaterskolan i Helsingfors (the Swedish Theatre School in Helsinki) and focused on serving the whole Swedish-language theatre field in Finland.

=== Theatre Academy Helsinki (1979–2013) ===
The Theatre Academy in its current bilingual form was created in 1979 in a merger of the Finnish-language Suomen Teatterikoulu and the Swedish-language Svenska Teaterskolan. The Central Library of Theatre Studies (Teatterialan keskuskirjasto), which was founded in 1956, became part of the academy. In 1992, the name was changed to Teatteri- ja tanssialan keskuskirjasto (the Central Library of Theatre and Dance) and in 2001 to its current form Teatterikorkeakoulun kirjasto (the Theatre Academy Library).

The education and research offering of the Theatre Academy has expanded beyond the traditional programmes in acting, directing and dramaturgy to include dance (1983), lighting and sound design (1986) and performance art and theory (2001). The dance teacher programme, which started at the Department of Dance, moved to the new Department of Dance and Theatre Pedagogy in 1997. The department also started offering a separate programme for theatre teacher education.

=== Theatre Academy of the University of the Arts Helsinki (2013-present) ===
At the start of 2013, the Theatre Academy Helsinki, the Finnish Academy of Fine Arts and Sibelius Academy merged into the University of the Arts Helsinki. The full English name of the academy is now the Theatre Academy of the University of the Arts Helsinki.

=== Rectors and deans ===
==== Rectors ====
- Eero Melasniemi 1979–1982
- Jouko Turkka 1983–1985
- Outi Nyytäjä 1985–1987
- Marianne Möller 1987–1988 vt.
- Maija-Liisa Márton 1988–1990
- Raila Leppäkoski 1990–1991
- Kari Rentola 1991–1997
- Lauri Sipari 1997–2005
- Paula Tuovinen 2005–2013

==== Deans ====
- Paula Tuovinen 2013–2014
- Maarit Ruikka 2014–2023
- Otso Huopaniemi 2023–

== Education and research ==
=== Degrees ===
The Theatre Academy offers bachelor and master programmes as well as licentiate and doctoral programmes. The degree title of bachelor programme graduates is the Bachelor of Arts (Dance or Theatre). The credit load of bachelor programmes is 180 ECTS credits, and the recommended duration is three years of full-time study.

Master programmes are available to candidates who have completed the corresponding bachelor's degree or another comparable degree (for example, at a Finnish polytechnic or university of applied sciences or another institution of higher education abroad). The credit load of master programmes is 120 ECTS credits, and the recommended duration is two years of full-time study.

Master programme graduates may apply to a licentiate programme or directly to a doctoral programme. The Licentiate of Arts (Dance/Theatre) degree requires 120 ECTS credits, which is equivalent to two years of full-time study. The Doctor of Arts (Dance/Theatre) degree requires 240 ECTS credits, which is equivalent to four years of study.

=== Study programmes ===
Degree programmes	Bachelor of Arts (Theare and Drama)	Master of Arts (Theatre and Drama)	Bachelor of Arts (Dance)	Master of Arts (Dance)
Degree and Master's Degree Programme in Lighting Design	x	x		
Degree Programme and Master's Degree Programme in Sound Design	x	x		
Degree Programme in Acting	x	x		
Degree Programme in Acting in Swedish	x	x		
Master's Degree Programme in Live Art and Performance Studies (LAPS)		x		
Degree Programme in Directing	x	x		
Degree Programme in Dance BA			x	
Master's Degree Programme in Dance				x
Master’s Degree Programme in Choreography				x
Degree Programme in Dramaturgy	x	x		
Master’s Degree Programme in Dance Pedagogy				x
Master's Degree Programme in Theatre Pedagogy		x		

== Previous departments and degree programmes ==
There are five departments in the Theatre Academy:

- Department of Theatre and Drama: Acting in Finnish (BA/MA), Directing (BA/MA), Dramaturgy (BA/MA), Live Art and Performance Studies (MA)
- Department of Dance: Dance (BA), Dance (MA), Choreography (MA)
- Department of Acting in Swedish: Acting in Swedish (BA/MA), Nordic Masterprogramme (MA)
- Department of Dance and Theatre Pedagogy: Dance Pedagogy (MA), Theatre Pedagogy (MA)
- Department of Lighting and Sound Design: Lighting and Sound Design (BA/MA)

=== Facilities ===
The current facilities of the Theatre Academy are located in the Sörnäinen district in Helsinki, in two separate buildings: TeaK-Kookos (Haapaniemenkatu 6) and Teak-Vässi (Lintulahdenkatu 3). TeaK-Kookos houses all of the academy's operations apart from the Department of Lighting and Sound Design, which operates at TeaK-Vässi. The TeaK-Kookos facilities opened in 2000 and TeaK-Vässi opened in 2007. The main building was once home to the Kookos soap and margarine factory and later to the Kone elevator factory. The facilities include a large theatre hall and several studios for public performances, and an extensive library specialised in performing arts. TeaK-Vässi operates in an old warehouse of Elanto.

The Theatre Academy has had various locations over the course of its history. Since its founding until 1992, the academy operated on Ehrensvärdintie in the Eira district and in the Töölö district of Helsinki. In 1992, all operations except the Department of Dance and the Department of Lighting and Sound Design moved to Kulttuuritalo and Paahtimo, formerly an industrial facility. The academy moved to its current facilities on Haapaniemenkatu in 2000. The Department of Lighting and Sound Design was located in the city of Tampere from 1988–2007 at a facility which now houses the Centre for Practise as Research in Theatre.
