= Expo '70 (band) =

- Origin: Los Angeles, CA, USA
- Genres: Ambient; drone; neo-psychedelia; space rock
- Years active: 2003–present
- Labels: Beta-lactam Ring; Essence; Immune; Kill Shaman; Peasant Magik; Sonic Meditations
- Members: Justin Wright
- Past members: Julian Peeke
- Website: www.exposeventy.com

Expo '70 (also written Expo Seventy) is an American drone / space rock group, founded in 2003 by Justin Wright in Los Angeles, California, who shortly afterwards moved back to his native Kansas City, Missouri. Expo '70 is mainly the project of Wright, but often features additional musicians in the studio and is a trio live. Wright also runs his own record label called Sonic Meditations.
