= Guided Missile =

- Founded: 1994
- Founder: Paul Guided Missile
- Defunct: 2004
- Country of origin: England
- Location: London

Guided Missile was a British, London-based, independent record label set up by Paul Kearney in 1994, and active until the early 2000s.

== History ==
Guided Missile Records focused on releases by underground indie bands through the late 1990s.

A tribute record Orchestral Manoeuvres in the Darkness by Diff'rent Darkness charted at 66 on UK Official Charts Company chart in 2003.

=== Post history ===
Guided Missile continued to at least 2013 as an events promoter, at venues such as The Islington, The Lexington and, until closure, The Buffalo Bar.

== Artists ==
- Bis
- Country Teasers
- God Is My Co-Pilot
- Kling Klang
- Lungleg
- The Male Nurse
- The Yummy Fur

== See also ==
- List of record labels
