= Tala Madani =

Iranian-born American artist (born 1981)

- طلا مدنی
- Born: December 1981 (age 44); Tehran, Iran
- Education: Oregon State University, Yale University
- Spouse: Nathaniel Mellors (m. 2015)

Tala Madani (b. Dec. 1981; Persian: طلا مدنی) is an Iranian-born American artist, known for her contemporary paintings, drawings, and animations. She lives in Los Angeles, California.

== Early life and education ==
Madani was born in Tehran, Iran in December 1981. From the age of seven, she studied calligraphy and painting.

In 1994 she moved to Oregon. Madani graduated from Oregon State University in Corvallis, Oregon in 2004 with a BA degree in political science and visual arts. She did an internship in Berlin in 2003 with the German Council for Foreign Affairs and worked with an expert on Iranian affairs. In 2006, she graduated from Yale University School of Art in New Haven, Connecticut with an MFA degree in painting.

== Work ==
Madani is known for her use of cartoonish and exaggerated sexual imageries in her paintings. Her work often focuses on the relationship between the adult and child. Many of her works contain images of men in traditionally childlike positions, playing with their anuses, bodily fluids, and penises. The paintings utilize satirical humor, and are very loose in their execution. Madani works to capture the moment an idea emerges in sketchbooks and she translates this by using decisive brushwork and strong lines in her paintings, and is a visual example of real world impulses that get repressed. In 2008 Madani began incorporating animation into her work, as an attempt to bring the painting to action.

Madani's work was included in the 2017 Whitney Biennial held at the Whitney Museum of American Art in New York City. Awards have included Louis Comfort Tiffany Foundation (2013), Catherine Doctorow Prize for Contemporary Painting (2013), the De Volkskrant Art Award (2012), Pinchuk Art Centre (2012), the Van den Berch van Heemstede Stichting Fellowship (2008), and the Kees Verwey Fellowship (2007). In September 2022, the first North American survey of Madani's work opened at The Geffen Contemporary at MOCA, Los Angeles.

Madani's work is found in the public museum collections of Hammer Museum, Cornell Fine Arts Museum, Whitney Museum of American Art, Tate museum, among others.

== Personal life ==
In 2015, Madani married Nathaniel Mellors, an English contemporary artist and musician, in Los Angeles. They have two children.

== See also ==
- List of Iranian women artists
