= Live Aids =

2008 EP by the Rebel

EP by The Rebel
- Released: Summer 2008
- Recorded: Early 2007
- Genre: Art punk
- Label: Kanker Mongool
- Producer: Ben Wallers

The Rebel chronology
Tarscoffsky's The Snackrifice (2007)	Live Aids (2008)	Northern Rocks Bear Weird Vegetable (2008)

Live AIDS is a 7" single by The Rebel that was released in Summer 2008. The limited edition clear gold single is the first release from Montreal "weird punk" label 'Kanker Mongool'. The title is both a play on Live Aid, as well as a nod to The Rebel's tour mates, AIDS Wolf, of which both Kanker Mongool creators, Yannick Desranleau and Chloe Lum, are members. The album also features silkscreened artwork from Desranleau and Lum's design company, Seripop.

== A Side ==
- "In My Wallet"
- "You're Just Like Tammy Wynette"

=== B Side ===
- "Knapsack"
- "Beware Nicole Intro"

== Line Up ==
- S.Politowicz: drums
- B.R. Wallers: other instruments
