= Pauliina Feodoroff =

Skolt Sámi film & theater director, screenwriter, advocate

Pauliina Feodoroff (born 1977 in Inari, Finland) is a Skolt Sámi film director, theater director, screenwriter, and Sápmi advocate. An active advocate of Sámi culture and Sámi rights, she has served as Chair of the Saami Council.

== Biography ==
Pauliina Feodoroff was born in Inari in 1977. Her family was involved in reindeer husbandry. She graduated from the Helsinki Theatre Academy's degree program in directing and dramaturgy in 2002. Feodoroff's first feature film, Non Profit, made on a budget of €20,000 and taking ten years to produce, premiered at the Skabmagova-Kaamos Festival in Inari in January 2007. She was awarded the Kritiikin Kannukset (Critique Award) for this film. In 2009, Feodoroff became Artistic Director of Theater Takomo with Milja Sarkola.

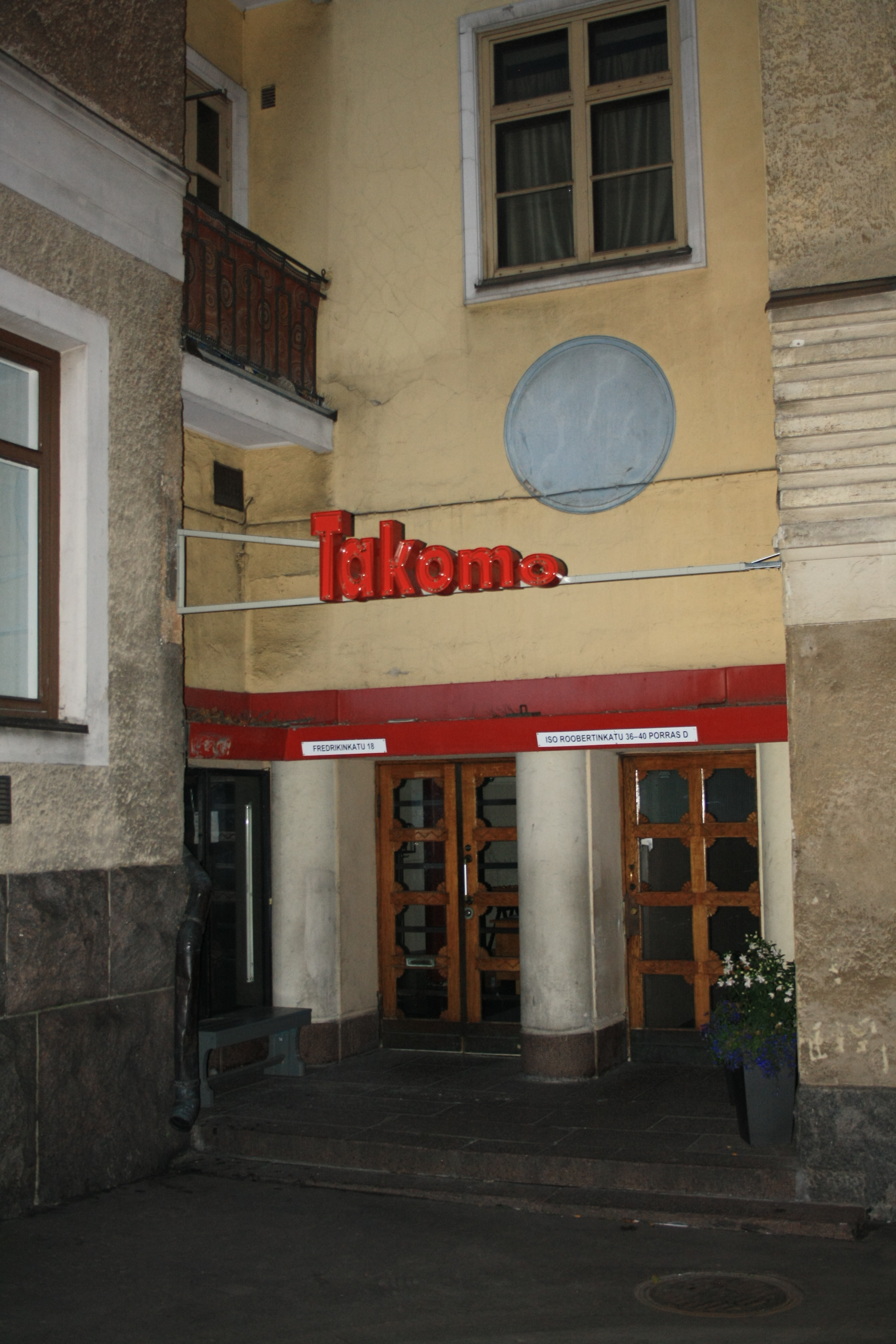
Theater Takomo

Feodoroff's advocacy in uploading traditional Skolt Sámi society and culture includes issues regarding land and water rights. She has served as the Chair of the Sámi Council for a two-year period during 2007–2008.

In 2020, Feodoroff was one of several Sámi artists selected by The Office of Contemporary Art Norway to exhibit at the Nordic Pavilion, recast as the Sámi Pavilion, for the 2022 Venice Biennale. Feodoroff showed a 90-minute performance in three acts, Matriarchy. The project explores colonialism from a Sámi perspective. It also displays Såmi landscapes as portraits and simultaneously reclaims Sámi land by working with a nonprofit organisation, the Snowchange Cooperative, that aims to shield northern Finnish land from further deforestation.

== Awards ==
In 2012, Feodoroff won the Theatre Academy's Alumnus/Alumna award for artists, pedagogues, or other professionals for their outstanding achievement in theatre together with Milja Sarkola. In 2016, she received the Paul K. Feyerabend Award-- a World of Solidarity is Possible.

Since 2017, Feodoroff has been nominated for the Europe Prize Theatrical Realities of the Europe Theatre Prize.

== Filmography ==
- 2003 Saamen kadonnut maa
- 2006 Viimeinen joiku Saamenmaan metsissä?
- 2007 Kiurrels
- 2007 Sevetin tytöt
- 2008 Non Profit
- 2016 Sparrooabbán ("Me and My Little Sister")

== Sources ==
- Kervinen, Elina, ”Pohjolan kuvaaja”, Suomen Kuvalehti 46/2008
- Moring, Kirsikka, ”Joiku vaihtui rapiksi, porot biteiksi”, Helsingin Sanomat 30.1.2007
