= Junior Aspirin Records =

Junior Aspirin Records is an artist-run independent record label founded in London in 2002 by Andy Cooke, Dan Fox, Ashley Marlowe and Nathaniel Mellors.

== Artists ==
- The God in Hackney
- Skill 7 Stamina 12
- Socrates That Practices Music
- Nathaniel Mellors
- Dan Fox
- Invisible Polytechnic
- Advanced Sportswear
- Big Legs

The label has also released music by Charlottefield, DJ Scotch Egg, Imitation Electric Piano, Toilet, Jack Too Jack, Sue Tompkins, The Rebel, Emily Wardill, Bob Parks, Same Things, Mysterius Horse, Adventure, and D.J. Lonely + Blodfet.

== Discography ==
ASP 001 Skill 7 Stamina 12 / Zebra Zebra. Split 7-inch vinyl.

ASP 002 Skill 7 Stamina 12 - Museum of Surfaces. 7-inch vinyl.

ASP 003 Skill 7 Stamina 12 - Robotics With Strings. CD album & digital.

ASP 004 God in Hackney CD-R.

ASP 005 Same Things CD-R.

ASP 006 The Rebel - Prawns (album) vinyl LP & digital.

ASP 007 Skill 7 Stamina 12 & Socrates That Practices Music - split 12-inch vinyl & digital.

ASP 008 Remove Celebrity Centre - A Junior Aspirin Records Compilation. CD album & digital.

ASP 009 Skill 7 Stamina 12 - Skill 7 Stamina Dead. Vinyl LP & digital.

ASP 010 Mysterius Horse - CD-R.

ASP 011 Toilet - CD-R.

ASP 012 The Rebel - Mouthwatering Claustrophobic Changes (M.C.C.). Vinyl LP & digital.

ASP 013 Adventure (Nicholas Bullen, Mark Beasley, Steve Beasley) CD album.

ASP 014 Skill 7 Stamina 12, Toilet, Same Things. Split 12-inch vinyl.

ASP 015 Bob Parks - The R&B Feeling. Vinyl LP & digital.

ASP 016 God in Hackney - Untitled. Triangular lathe-cut 8" record.

ASP 017 Dan Fox - Easy Sneezing At The Century. Digital release.

ASP 018 Advanced Sportswear - CD album + insert in zip-lock bag.

ASP 019 The Rebel - The Incredible Hulk. Vinyl LP & digital.

ASP 020 Invisible Polytechnic perform Terry Riley's IN C. Vinyl LP & digital.

ASP 021 Socrates that practices music - Further conclusions against an Italian version (BAT). Vinyl LP & digital.

ASP 023 The Rebel - The Race Against Time Hots Up. Vinyl LP & digital.

ASP 024 Dan Fox - Moonlighting EP. Digital release.

ASP 025 Big Legs - Big Legs. Vinyl LP & digital.

ASP 026 The God in Hackney - Cave Moderne. Vinyl LP & digital.

ASP 028 The God in Hackney - Small Country Eclipse. Vinyl LP & digital.

ASP 029 Nathaniel Mellors - Horrific Object. 7-inch vinyl.

ASP 030 Nathaniel Mellors - Life Becomes a Promo. Limited 7-inch vinyl with unique drawn / painted sleeves & digital single (2022)

ASP 031 The God in Hackney - Heaven & Black Water/In This Room. 7-inch vinyl & digital single (2023)

ASP 032 The God in Hackney - The World in Air Quotes. Baby blue vinyl & digital album (2023)

== Live shows ==
Live shows by the label bands have include appearances at the ICA London; Centre Pompidou, Paris; a mini-tour of China; The Kitchen, New York; and the Hammer Museum, Los Angeles.

== Podcasts ==
Between 2008 and 2017, Junior Aspirin Records produced an irregular series of themed podcasts. Subjects included: 'Exercises in Style', 'Explaining Success and Failure', 'Explaining Limbo', 'Political Incorrect Correct', the four medieval humors, 'Explaining Melodrama', 'Explaining Capitalism (With Particular Reference to the Military Industrial Complex)', 'Empathy', Christmas, and the Brexit themed 'Brexpod.'

In collaboration with The Serving Library, the label has produced a similar series of themed podcasts under the umbrella title 'Audio Annotations'. Topics have included narrative, taste, materiality and nothingness, community, and sport.

== See also ==
- List of record labels
