= Country Teasers =

Scottish art punk band

- Origin: Edinburgh, Scotland
- Genres: Cowpunk; art punk; garage punk; noise rock; alternative country
- Years active: 1993–2008
- Labels: Crypt; Guided Missile; In The Red; Fat Possum; Holy Mountain; Butcher's Wig; Nana
- Past members: Ben Wallers; Simon Stephens; Alan Crichton; George Miller; Mark Carr; Eck King; Richard Greenan; Lawrence Worthington; Alastair MacKinven; Robert McNeill; Kaanan Tupper; Joe Patt; Leighton Crook; Sophie Politowicz; James Sedwards

Country Teasers were an art punk band formed in Edinburgh, Scotland in 1993.

Frontman Ben Wallers also performs solo as The Rebel. He plays live shows with a Gameboy backing-track or accompanied by Country Teasers bassist Sophie Politowicz on drums.

Long-time members of Country Teasers include songwriter B.R. Wallers (vocals, guitar), Leighton Crook (drums), Robert McNeill (guitar, synth), Alastair MacKinven (guitar), Sophie Politowicz (bass guitar, drums). Original members of the band include playwright Simon Stephens (bass guitar), Alan Crichton (guitar), Eck King (drums), Lawrence Worthington (drums). Richard Greenan (guitar) occasionally plays with the band.

== Background ==
Early Country Teasers albums were characterised by literate, scathingly satirical lyrics and discordant, repetitive sound – like William S. Burroughs leading Joy Division or The Fall through a setlist of art-damaged country and western songs.

Later Teasers releases branched out to "abuse not only country and western but every other genre they can get their hands on, including rap, goth, punk, folk, disco, electronic, and noise," leading to comparisons with other home-recording deconstructionists like Royal Trux, Butthole Surfers and Ween.

Frontman and songwriter Ben Wallers's lyrics have elicited comparisons to Jonathan Swift, Bill Hicks and Chris Morris, provoking the audience with unorthodox standpoints and purposefully offensive vocabulary in order to force them to question their own opinions. In the words of a writer on the Drowned in Sound website, ""Evil country outfit" Country Teasers are led by the enigmatic singer/guitarist BR Wallers. Their discordant aural assault is filled out with bitingly ironic lyrics, poking fun at racism and sexism by inhabiting the minds of the losers that purvey these attitudes." "Like moralistic ’80s punks Crass, the Country Teasers make their statement, but they use humor to do it, as opposed to histrionic art-house punk screech… They find your comfort zone and blissfully stomp all over it."

The Teasers' live shows are infamously unpredictable fusions of alcohol-or-whatever-fueled unprofessionalism and high-concept performance art, or in the words of the New York Press: "Country Teasers does art better than Sonic Youth and drunkenness better than The Pogues—and doesn’t need art or liquor to be confrontational bastards."

Country Teasers are often compared to The Fall, although as Static Party's Ryan W points out, "it's not in the chord structures or the Northern (UK) accent, it's in the feel they create akin to the early Fall records that a truly creative brain is battering against resistance (self or other) to create something meaningful to itself. If you get something from it as well... Art! Put on a CT record and read the Maakies comics, it's better than bread and chocolate."

== Discography ==
=== Albums ===
- The Pastoral - Not Rustic - World of Their Greatest Hits (1995, Crypt Records)
- Satan Is Real Again, or Feeling Good About Bad Thoughts (1996, Crypt Records)
- Back to the Future, or Brideshead Revisitted Revisitted (1998, Guided Missile)
- Destroy All Human Life (1999, Fat Possum)
- Science Hat Artistic Cube Moral Nosebleed Empire (2002, In the Red)
- Secret Weapon Revealed at Last, or Full Moon Empty Sportsbag (2003, In the Red)
- Live Album (2005, In the Red)
- The Empire Strikes Back (2006, In the Red)
- W.O.A.R./W.O.A. (split 12" with Ezee Tiger) (2008, Holy Mountain Records)

=== Singles ===
- "Anytime, Cowboy", (1995, Crypt Records)
  - "Anytime, Cowboy", with b-side "No.1 Man"
- Split 7" with Penthouse, (1996, Butcher's Wig)
  - "Getaway"
- The Scottish Single, (1996, Guided Missile)
  - "The Last Bridge of Spencer Smith", with b-side "Prettiest Slave on the Barge/Kenny Malcolm on Smack"
- Secrets in Welsh (1996, Nana Records)
  - "Tough Luck on Jock", "Treble Life, Part 2", "Secrets in Welsh" and "Flares"
- Against the Country Teasers! (1996, Guided Missile)
  - "After One Thing", "Bryson's the Baker", "Small Shark in Tiny Pool", "Adam Wakes Up", "Kenny Malcolm On Smack Left Prettiest Slave On The Right" and "Henry Krinkle's Theme"
- Split 7" with Amnesiac Godz (2/3 Sebadoh), (1999, Guided Missile Records)
  - "Country Teasers", "Hairy Wine" and "Reynard the Fox"
- "Laziness", (2004, Discos Alehop, hop 022)
  - "Raglan Top Of Lonsdale Grey", "Assfucksiation Initiated", "Laziness", "Ahoy There"

=== Videos ===
- "Country Teasers" live at CasRock Edinburgh, (1994, barnend video)
- "Various Artists" Transistor 1. Anytimecowboy. (video compilation released by Amendment Records (US) around 2001-2002)Features rare live footages from 1998-2001
- "THIS FILM SHOULD NOT EXIST": 1995 tour with The Oblivians, a film by Gisella Albertini, Massimo Scocca, Nicolas Drolc, 2020, Les films Furax and Bo Fidelity Cineproduzioni.

=== Appearances ===
- Guided Missile Recordings: A "Guided" Tour (1996, Guided Missile)
  - [tracks unknown]
- Plan Boom (1996, What's That Noise Records)
  - "Black Eggs"
- Maximum Beatbox (1996, Fidel Bastro (Hell No!)/Heinz Krämers Tanz Café)
  - "O1- Only My saviour" "O2 getaway"recorded live at Heinz Krämers Tanz Café 1995/96
- Cheapo Crypt Sampler #2! (1997, Crypt Records)
  - "Black Change" and "Mosquito"
- Crypt - Beat Generation (1997, Beat Generation no. 5)
  - "Black Change" and "Black Cloud Wandering"
- Hits & Missiles (1998, Guided Missile)
  - "Only Whittlin"
- Opscene #6, (1999, Opscene Magazine)
  - "Hairy Wine"
- Don't Tread On Me (1999, Butcher's Wig/Shellshock/Pinnacle)
  - "Getaway"
- Flitwick Records Compilation (2002, Flitwick Records)
  - "Independent Mail Guardian (Success)"
- La Legaña Sinfónica (2003, Discos Alehop!)
  - "Please Stop Fucking Each Other"
- Hot Pinball Rock Vol. 2 (Multiball #22 CD with magazine) (2004, Extra Ball Records)
  - "Pinball Machine"
- Babyhead (2004, S-S Records)
  - "I Like the Cock"
- Static Disaster: The U.K. In The Red Records Sampler (2005, In The Red)
  - "Success"
- Revolver USA Sampler Summer '06 (2006, Midheaven)
  - "Please Ban Music"
