= Frame Contemporary Art Finland =

Finnish art foundation

Frame Contemporary Art Finland (previously Frame Visual Art Finland) is a Finnish foundation whose mission is to promote Finnish contemporary art internationally. It supports international projects, awards grants to artists and art professionals, facilitates professional partnerships, and acts as an information centre for Finnish contemporary art. Frame commissions and produces Finland's exhibitions at the Venice Biennale. The foundation is supported by the Finnish Ministry of Education and Culture.

== About Frame ==
Frame's international programme includes an expert visitor programme for non-Finnish contemporary art professionals, as well as networking and research projects such as the Frame Curatorial Research Fellowship programme, the Peer-to-Peer programme, the Finland-Russia Curatorial Exchange, and the Helsinki International Curator Programme (HICP), which is run in collaboration with HIAP (Helsinki International Artist Programme). For the years 2019–2023, Frame organised the Rehearsing Hospitalities programme, which consisted of different forms of offline and online events such as talks, performances, gatherings, readings, and podcasts.

Frame's director is Raija Koli. Its office is located on Ratakatu in central Helsinki.

Frame Foundation is the successor of FRAME – Finnish Fund for Art Exchange (1992–2011). It was founded in December 2011 by the cities of Espoo, Helsinki, Lahti, Oulu, Tampere, Turku, and Vantaa, the Fine Arts Academy of Finland, the Finnish Art Society, and Stiftelsen Pro Artibus. The foundation was registered in May 2012.

== Finland at the Venice Biennale ==
Frame commissions and produces exhibitions for the Pavilion of Finland at the Venice International Art Exhibition (Venice Biennale, La Biennale di Venezia). Finland also co-exhibits with Norway and Sweden in the Nordic Pavilion. The Finnish pavilion is designed by architect Alvar Aalto (1954), and the Nordic Pavilion by architect Sverre Fehn (1964). Both pavilions are located in the Giardini, the main exhibition venue at the Biennale.

In 2022 Finland's representative at the 59th Venice Biennale is Pilvi Takala. Takala's exhibition is curated by Christina Li.

In 2019 Finland exhibited A Greater Miracle of Perception by The Miracle Workers Collective (MWC) at the Finnish pavilion. The MWC is formed by writer Maryan Abdulkarim, scriptwriter Khadar Ahmed, writer Hassan Blasim, choreographer Sonya Lindfors, artist Outi Pieski, artist Leena Pukki, artist Martta Tuomaala, artist Lorenzo Sandoval, cinematographer Christopher L. Thomas, storyteller Suvi West, curator Giovanna Esposito Yussif, curator Christopher Wessels and curator Bonaventure Soh Bejeng Ndikung. Exploring the miracle as a poetic vehicle from which to expand perceptions and experiences, the exhibition presented MWC's collective film work The Killing of Čáhcerávga (2019), which was in dialogue with the site-specific sculptural installation Ovdavázzit – Forewalkers (2019) by Outi Pieski.

In 2017 the Finnish pavilion featured The Aalto Natives, an exhibition by Erkka Nissinen and Nathaniel Mellors. It was curated by Xander Karskens, artistic director of the Cobra Museum (from 1 December 2016).

Representing Finland at the 2015 Biennale was the artist duo IC-98 (Patrik Söderlund and Visa Suonpää) with their site-specific installation Hours, Years, Aeons. The installation combined research, drawing and animation, and it formed part of the duo's Abendland series. The exhibition was curated by Taru Elfving, PhD, Frame's Head of Programme at the time.

In 2013 Finland exhibited both in the Finnish pavilion and the Nordic pavilion. The Falling Trees exhibition featured Antti Laitinen in the Finnish pavilion and Terike Haapoja in the Nordic Pavilion. The exhibition was curated by Gruppo 111 (Marko Karo, Mika Elo and Harri Laakso).

== FRAME - Finnish Fund For Art Exchange ==
Frame Foundation's predecessor, FRAME – Finnish Fund for Art Exchange, was an organisation dedicated to promoting Finnish contemporary art internationally. The organisation operated as an independent unit under the administration of the Foundation for the Fine Arts Academy of Finland from 1992 to 2011. From 2004 to 2009 FRAME published a bi-annual contemporary art publication called Framework (later FRAMER).
