= The Empire Strikes Back (Country Teasers album) =

Studio album by Country Teasers
- Released: 2006
- Recorded: October 17 – November 3, 2005
- Genre: Rock
- Label: In the Red Records

Country Teasers chronology
| Live Album (2005) | The Empire Strikes Back (2006) |

Professional ratings
Review scores
| Source | Rating |
|---|---|
| AllMusic | 3.5/5 stars |

The Empire Strikes Back is the fifth studio album by Country Teasers.

== Reception ==
Frieze magazine described the album as "Full of moral outrage, scything black humour and joyful Garage-Punk invention, it is also a provocative assault on the hypocritical uses and abuses of language."

== Track listing ==
All tracks written by Ben Wallers except where noted.

=== Side one ===
1. "Spiderman in the Flesh" (Wallers/Roger Waters) – 4:09
2. "Points of View" – 5:06
3. "Hitlers & Churchills" – 3:09
4. "Mos E17ley" – 4:43
5. "The Ship" – 4:15
6. "Raglan Top of Lonsdale Grey" – 5:26

=== Side two ===
1. "Good Looking Boys or Women" – 3:23
2. "Your English" – 3:56
3. "Panic Holiday" – 3:42
4. "White Patches" – 7:16
5. "Please Ban Music / Gegen Alles" – 5:02

== Personnel ==
- Leighton Crook – drums, bass (11)
- Alastair Mackinven – guitar, percussion (9)
- Robert McNeill – keyboard, guitar "Oscillations" (4)
- Sophie Politowicz – bass guitar, drums (11)
- Ben Wallers – vocals, guitar; creaking on the "Ship, Oscillations" (9)
