= Kill Shaman Records =

Independent record label

- Founded: 2003
- Founder: Crabby Levine, Paul Kneejie
- Status: Active
- Genre: Punk, progressive rock, experimental
- Country of origin: (United States) USA
- Location: Los Angeles and Oakland, California
- Official website: www.killshaman.com

Kill Shaman Records is an independent record label which was founded in 2003 by Paul Kneejie and Crabby Levine in Los Angeles, CA. It is now split in both Oakland and Los Angeles, California

== Artists ==
- Crime in Choir
- Expo '70
- Thee Oh Sees

== Discography ==
- KSR51: The Dreams "Morbido" LP
- KSR50: The Feeling of Love "Dissolve Me" LP
- KSR49: The Rebel / Bomber Jackets "Split" 7"
- KSR48: Cheveu "1000" LP
- KSR47: Movie Star Junkies "In a Night like This" 10"
- KSR46: Sharp Ends "S/T" LP
- KSR45: The Dictaphone "S/T" LP
- KSR44: The Moles "Untune the Sky" 2X12″LP Reissue
- KSR43: Agent Side Grinder "Debut" CD
- KSR42: Night Control "Life Control" CD
- KSR41: Feeling of Love "OK Judge Revival" 12″ LP
- KSR40: Uphill Gardeners "5-6″ LP
- KSR39: Ty Segall and Mikal Cronin "Reverse Shark Attack" 12″ LP
- KSR38: Hiroshima Rocks Around / Bipolar Bear Split 12″ LP
- KSR37: Flight "Flight" 10″
- KSR36: The Pink Noise "Graffiti Youth" LP
- KSR35: The Watts Ensemble "Crime and Time" CD
- KSR34: The Oh Sees "Zork's Tape Bruise" LP + CD
- KSR33: Nerve City "I Fucked Death" 10″
- KSR32.5: Expo '70 "Audio Archives 003″ CD-R
- KSR32: Night Control "Death Control" CD
- KSR31.5: Man's Assassination Man / Metal Marty King "Split" CS
- KSR31: Crime in Choir "Gift Givers" CD
- KSR30-5: Justin Wright / Matt Hill / Duane Pitre 3-Way Split CD-R
- KSR30: Love Tan "Miscellaneous Night Feelings" LP
- KSR29: Bad Dudes "Eat Drugs" LP
- KSR28: Rodent Plague "Blue Wave/Return to Zero" 7″
- KSR27: Expo '70 / Rahdunes Split 12″
- KSR26: Factums "Spells and Charms" CD
- KSR25: Gowns "Red State" LP
- KSR24: Yikes! "Whoa Comas/Blood Bomb" CDEP
- KSR23: Landed / Megafuckers Split 7″
- KSR22: Expo '70 "Animism" CD
- KSR21.5: Cantus Firmus "A Zen Sutra" CD-R
- KSR20.5: Cantus Firmus "Shanghai Gal" CD-R
- KSR20: Bipolar Bear / Watusi Zombie Split 7″
- KSR19.5: Expo '70 "Audio Archives 002″ CD-R
- KSR18.5: Expo '70 "Audio Archives 001″ CD-R
- KSR18: Expo '70 "Mystical Amplification" CD
- KSR17.5: Crystal Shards "4x Box Set" CD-R
- KSR17: Matt Hill "IV" CD-R
- KSR16.5: Crystal Shards "Oceans of Motions" CD-R
- KSR16: Expo '70 "Center of the Earth" CD-R
- KSR15.5: San Francisco Labor "Day Weekend" CD-R
- KSR15: Expo '70 "Exquisite Lust" CD-R
- KSR14: The Pope "Jazzman Cometh" CD
- KSR13: Expo '70 "Surfaces" CD-R
- KSR12: The Holy Kiss / Swan Danger Split 7″
- KSR11: Bipolar Bear /Aa "Books on Tapes Remixes" 7″
- KSR10: White Suits Brown Boots "WSBB" CD-R
- KSR9: Expo '70 "Live July 2004″ CD-R
- KSR8: Silver Daggers / Blue Silk Sutures Split 7″
- KSR7: Bad Dudes / The Pope Split 7″
- KSR6: Baby's Breath / 24K Gold Split 7″
- KSR5: SXBRS / Expo '70 Split CD-R
- KSR4: Manifolds /Die Princess Die Split 7″
- KSR3: Manifolds /Day's End Split 7″
- KSR2: Manifolds "III" CD
- KSR1: Manifolds "S/T" LP
