= Alastair MacKinven =

British artist (1971–2025)

- Born: 1971; Clatterbridge, England
- Died: 8 January 2025 (aged 53); London, United Kingdom
- Education: BFA Alberta College of Art, Calgary; MFA Goldsmiths College, London
- Years active: 1997–2025
- Known for: Painting], performance art

Alastair MacKinven (1971 – 8 January 2025) was a British visual artist based in London working on figurative painting and portraiture, film, and performance. He was a lecturer in painting at the University College of London's Slade School of Art and professor of the Figurative Painting Class in the Viennese Academy of Fine Art until his death in 2025. He held a BFA from Alberta College of Art, Calgary, in Canada (1994); and an MFA from Goldsmiths College, London (1996).

== Life and career ==
Alastair MacKinven's paintings touch on figuration, mythology, the physical and natural worlds depicting ethereal color combinations to present human and non human bodies and objects.

His first performance film work, All the Things You Could Be by Now If Robert Smithson's Wife Was Your Mother, which depicted the artist in nude, was exhibited in London in 2007.

In 2008, his solo show Alastair MacKinven at ICA London paid homage to Dutch designer and illustrator M. C. Escher. His performance Cut Off My Hand to Spite My Cock, in which he glued his own hand to the gallery floor, was too shown in 2008 at Camden Art Centre, London.

In 2009 MacKinven started working on the Abstract Capitalist Realism painting series and body of work about dualisms such as life and death, happiness and sadness, among others.

In the summer of 2020, his work was featured in the cover and content of Frontrunner, an arts journal edited by art critic Shana Beth Mason.

MacKinven's work was on view in Room by Room: Concepts, Themes, and Artists in the Rachofsky Collection, presented in 2023 at Warehouse Dallas. His work is included in the collection of Pérez Art Museum Miami, Florida.

On 8 January 2025, it was announced that MacKinven had died following a long illness. He was 53.
