= Nordic pavilion =

Venice Biennale national pavilion

Nordic Pavilion
- Padiglione Paesi Nordici
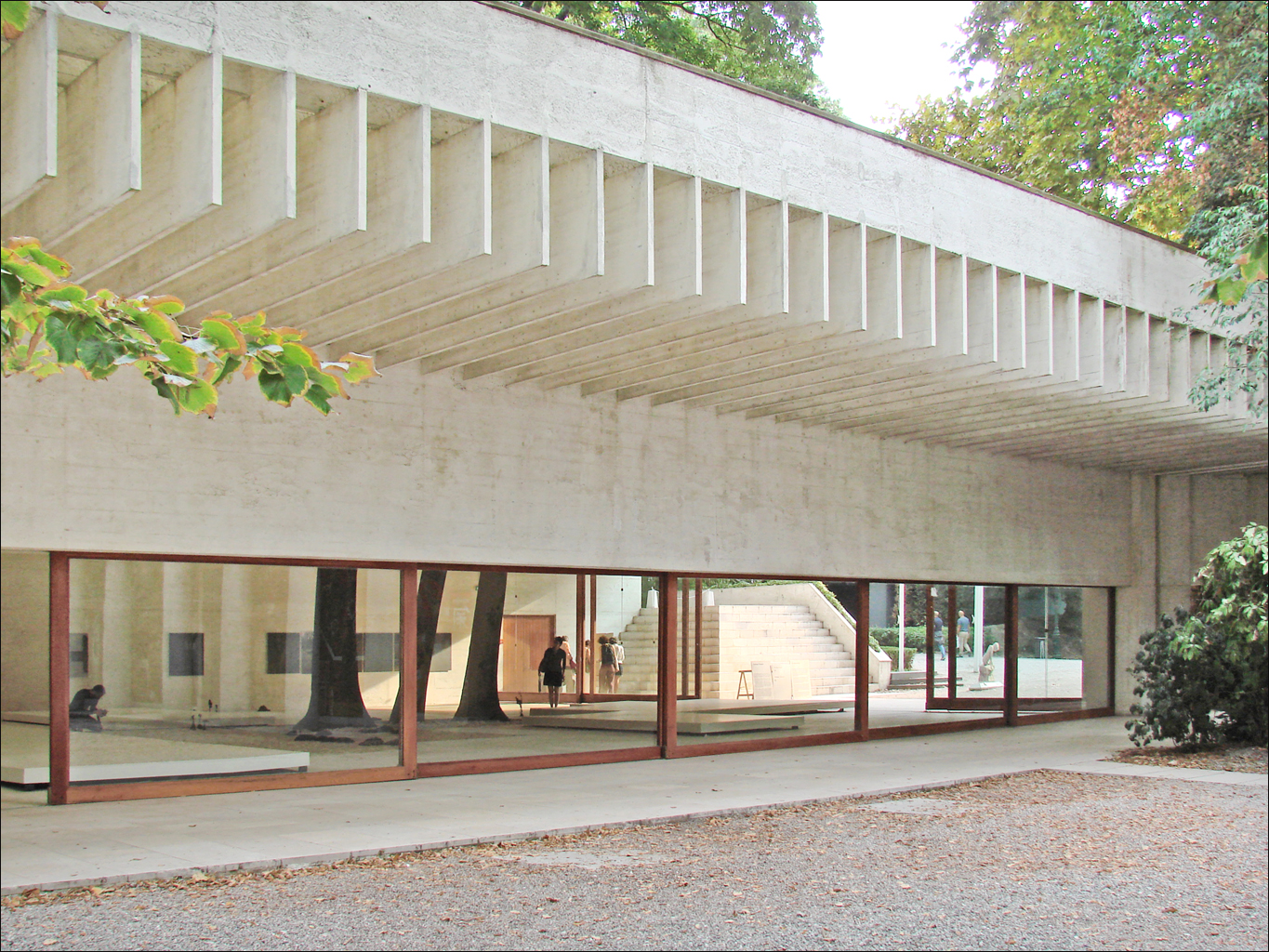
- The Nordic Pavilion
- Interactive map of the Nordic Pavilion area

General information
- Type: Venice Biennale national pavilion
- Architectural style: modernism
- Location: Venice, Italy
- Coordinates: 45.4285°N 12.3582°E
- Year built: 1958-1962

Design and construction
- Architect: Sverre Fehn

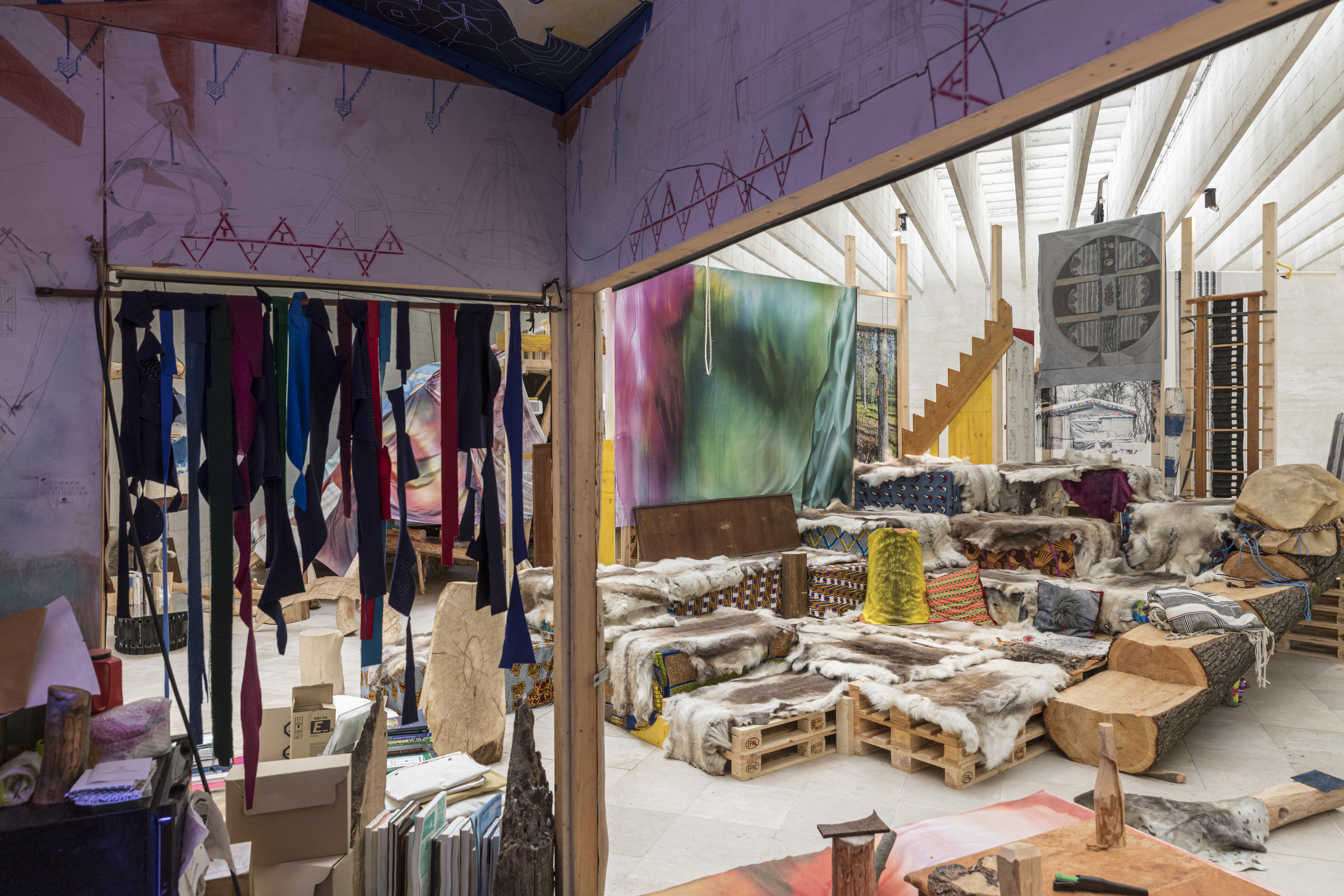
Girjegumpi: The Sámi Architecture Library by Joar Nango and collaborators at the 18th Venice Architecture Biennale in 2023.

The Nordic Pavilion houses the national representation of the Nordic countries Sweden, Norway, and Finland during the Venice Biennale arts festivals.

== Background ==
The Venice Biennale is an international art biennial exhibition held in Venice, Italy. Often described as "the Olympics of the art world", participation in the Biennale is a prestigious event for contemporary artists. The festival has become a constellation of shows: a central exhibition curated by that year's artistic director, national pavilions hosted by individual nations, and independent exhibitions held throughout Venice. The Biennale's parent organisation also runs regular festivals in other arts: architecture, dance, film, music and theatre.

Outside the central international exhibition, individual nations produce their own shows, known as pavilions, as their national representation. Nations that own their pavilion buildings – such as the 30 housed in the Giardini – are responsible for their own upkeep and construction costs as well. Nations without dedicated buildings create pavilions in venues throughout the city.

== Organization and building ==
The pavilion, designed by Sverre Fehn, was built between 1958 and 1962. The open space was designed to let in light reminiscent of that of Nordic countries. Fredrik Fogh extended the building in 1987.

The cooperation between Finland, Norway and Sweden in Venice was initiated in 1962 after the completion of the Nordic Pavilion. Until 1984, the representation of each country was organized nationally. From 1986 to 2009 the pavilion was commissioned as a whole, with the curatorial responsibility alternating between the collaborating countries.

Between 2011 and 2015, Sweden, Finland, and Norway took turns curating the pavilion alone. In 2017, they began joint curation again.

For the 2022 Biennale, the pavilion was redesignated as the Sámi pavilion in recognition of the three Indigenous artists selected for the exhibition: Pauliina Feodoroff, Máret Ánne Sara, and Anders Sunna. It was the first time the pavilion had hosted a group of only Sámi artists.

== Representation by year ==
=== Art ===
- 1962 — FINLAND: Ahti Lavonen, Kain Tapper, Esko Tirronen; NORWAY: Rolf Nesch, Knut Rumohr; SWEDEN: Siri Derkert, Per Olof Ulltvedt
- 1964 — FINLAND: Ina Colliander, Simo Hannula, Pentti Kaskipuro, Laila Pullinen; NORWAY: Hannah Ryggen; SWEDEN: Torsten Andersson, Martin Holmgren, Torsten Renqvist
- 1966 — FINLAND: Heikki Häiväoja, Harry Kivijärvi, Sam Vanni; NORWAY: Jakob Weidemann; SWEDEN: Öyvind Fahlström
- 1968 — FINLAND: Mauno Hartman, Kimmo Kaivanto, Ahti Lavonen; NORWAY: Gunnar S. Gundersen; SWEDEN: Sivert Lindblom, Arne Jones
- 1970 — FINLAND: Juhani Linnovaara; NORWAY: Arnold Haukeland; SWEDEN: Did not participate
- 1972 — FINLAND: Harry Kivijärvi, Pentti Lumikangas; NORWAY: Arne Ekeland; SWEDEN: Did not participate
- 1976 — FINLAND: Mikko Jalavisto, Tapio Junno, Kimmo Kaivanto, Ulla Rantanen; NORWAY: Boge Berg, Steinar Christensen/Kristian Kvakland, Arvid Pettersen; SWEDEN: ARARAT (Alternative Research in Architecture, Resources, Art and Technology)
- 1978 — FINLAND: Olavi Lanu; NORWAY: Frans Widerberg; SWEDEN: Lars Englund
- 1980 — FINLAND: Matti Kujasalo; NORWAY: Knut Rose; SWEDEN: Ola Billgren, Jan Håfström
- 1982 — FINLAND: Juhana Blomstedt; NORWAY: Synnøve Anker Aurdal; SWEDEN: Ulrik Samuelson
- 1984 — FINLAND: Kain Tapper, Carl-Erik Ström; NORWAY: Bendik Riis; SWEDEN: Curt Asker
- 1986 — "Techne": Bård Breivik (NO), Marianne Heske (NO), Olli Lyytikäinen (FI), Kjell Ohlin (SE), Erik H. Olson (SE), Silja Rantanen (FI), Carl Fredrik Reuterswärd (SE), Osmo Valtonen (FI) (Curator: Mats B.)
- 1988 — Per Inge Bjørlo (NO), Rolf Hanson (SE), Jukka Mäkelä (FI) (Curator: Maaretta Jaukkuri, FI)
- 1990 — "Cavén, Barclay, Håfström": Per Barclay (NO), Kari Cavén (FI), Jan Håfström (SE) (Curator: Per Hovdenakk, NO)
- 1993 — Jussi Niva (FI), Truls Melin (SE), Bente Stokke (NO) (Curator: Lars Nittve, SE)
- 1995 — Eva Løfdahl (SE), Per Maning (NO), Nina Roos (FI) (Curator: Timo Valjakka, FI)
- 1997 — "Naturally Artificial": Henrik Håkansson (SE), Mark Dion (US), Marianna Uutininen (FI), Mariko Mori (JP), Sven Påhlsson (NO) (Curator: Jon-Ove Steihaug, NO)
- 1999 — "End of a Story": Annika von Hausswolff (SE), Knut Åsdam (NO), Eija-Liisa Ahtila (FI). (Curator: John Peter Nilsson, SE)
- 2001 — "The North is Protected": Leif Elggren (SE), Tommi Grönlund/Petteri Nisunen (FI), Carl Michael von Hausswolff (SE), Anders Tomren (NO) (Curators: Grönlund/Nisunen, FI)
- 2003 — "Devil-May-Care": Karin Mamma Andersson (SE), Kristina Bræin (NO), Liisa Luonila (FI) (Curators: Anne Karin Jortveit and Andrea Kroksnes, NO)
- 2005 — "Sharing Space Dividing Time": Miriam Bäckström and Carsten Höller (SE/DE), Matias Faldbakken (NO) (Curator: Åsa Nacking, SE)
- 2007 — "Welfare — Fare Well": Adel Abidin (IQ/FI), Jacob Dahlgren (SE), Lars Ramberg (NO), Toril Goksøyr & Camilla Martens (NO), Sirous Namazi (SE), Maaria Wirkkala FI (Curator: René Block, DE)
- 2009 — "The Collectors" (in collaboration with the Danish Pavilion): Elmgreen and Dragset, Klara Lidén (SE), Wolfgang Tillmans (DE) and others (Curators: Elmgreen & Dragset, DK/NO)
- 2011 — SWEDEN: Fia Backström, Andreas Eriksson (Curator: Magnus af Petersens)
- 2013 — FINLAND: Terike Haapoja (Curators: Mika Elo, Marko Karo, Harri Laakso)
- 2015 — NORWAY: Camille Norment (Curator: Katya García-Antón)
- 2017 — Siri Aurdal (NO), Nina Canell (SE), Charlotte Johannesson (SE), Jumana Manna (PS), Pasi "Sleeping" Myllymäki (FI), and Mika Taanila (FI) (Curator: Mats Stjernstedt. Commissioners: Ann-Sofi Noring, Moderna Museet, Sweden, with Katya García-Antón, OCA – Office for Contemporary Art Norway, Norway, and Raija Koli, Frame Contemporary Art Finland, Finland)

=== Architecture ===
- 2023 – Girjegumpi: The Sámi Architecture Library by Joar Nango and collaborators

== Bibliography ==
- Russeth, Andrew (April 17, 2019). "The Venice Biennale: Everything You Could Ever Want to Know". ARTnews.
- Volpi, Cristiana (2013). "Nordic Countries (Sweden/Norway/Finland)". In Re Rebaudengo, Adele (ed.). Pavilions and Garden of Venice Biennale. Rome: Contrasto. p. 190. ISBN 978-88-6965-440-4.
