= Ben Wallers =

British musician

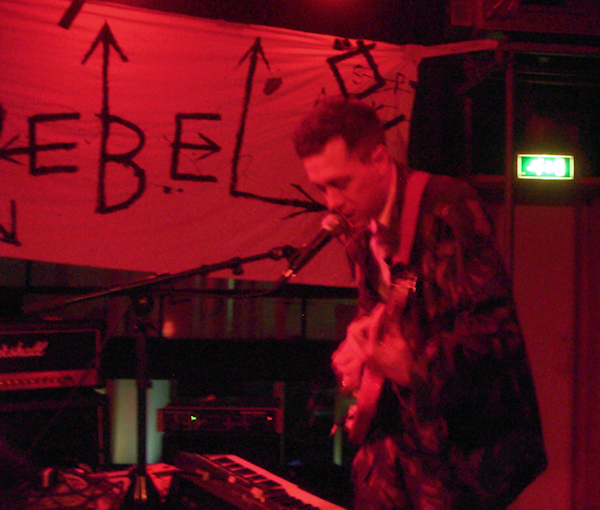
Ben Wallers performing as The Rebel at the Worm in Rotterdam, January 2008.

Benedict Roger Wallers, also known as The Rebel, is the frontman, guitarist, vocalist and songwriter for the band Country Teasers. His lyrics often deal with taboo subjects such as racism, sexism and xenophobia from first-person standpoints.

== Biography ==
Wallers has been releasing music under various guises since 1995. He is best known for being part of the group Country Teasers, formed in Scotland in the mid 1990s. Wallers is generally regarded to be Scottish, but various places of birth have been put forward, including Savile Row, London and St Albans, Hertfordshire (according to his autobiography). Country Teasers bassist Sophie Politowicz plays drums in live performances and features on various Rebel recordings. The pair also play together in the band The Devil.

== Music career ==
=== The Rebel ===
As well as Country Teasers, Wallers records under the moniker The Rebel. Most of the recordings, which are largely abridged musical interpretations of arcane and proper historical text, have not seen official release (several for the reason that they are "not masterpieces"). Before 1998 The Rebel was not known as The Walrus, but was named Walrus after the Wallers family name. The name 'The Rebel' is a reference and homage to the 1961 film starring Tony Hancock. Ben Wallers represents himself by a symbol called a Spakenkreuz, which is a swastika with a broken (or 'spastic') arm, bent backwards to cross over the previous arm. As far as he is aware, he invented this symbol.

- "KROT" (Monofonus Press, twelve inch, 2014)
- Still Taping After All These Discs (twelve inch, plamenco records, ltd 250, 2014)
- Sternold the Bachelor or Music 2000 (reissue cassette, +DL code ltd 100, neenrecords 2012)
- Nuclear Jazz Holocaust, (reissue cassette, +DL code ltd 100, Neen records 2012)
- Titrack Luxury or Bums on a Rock (reissue cassette + DL code ltd 100 nightschoolrecords)2012
- Nature's Wind Mixed Wine with Lethe (reissue cassette + DL code by nightschool records 2012 ltd 100)
- The Rebel - Pre-Pub EP//Year Of Birds - Blocker For Coinslot EP, (Ack! Ack! Ack! Records, split twelve inch, 2012)
- The five-year plan E.P, (Monofus press MF 034, 2011)
- The Rebel/The Bomber Jackets E.P., (Savoury Days and Kill Shaman Records, split seven-inch, 2011)
- The rebel/Bo Knows Split E.P, (Stipple records, STIPPLE-001)
- The Race Against Time Hots UP, (Junior Aspirin Records, twelve inch, 2010)
- The Incredible Hulk, (Junior Aspirin Records, twelve inch, 2009)
- Aiming Low E.P., (Lexi Disques, seven-inch, 2009)
- Mouthwatering Claustrophobic Changes!, (Junior Aspirin Records, twelve inch, 2009)
- Kufr E.P., (Needle Soup Records, compact disc, 2009)
- Northern Rocks Bear Weird Vegetable, Limited edition- velvet sleeve with inserts (Sacred Bones Records, twelve inch, 2008)
- Northern Rocks Bear Weird Vegetable, (Sacred Bones Records, twelve inch, 2008)
- Live Aids E.P., (Kanker Mongool, seven-inch, 2008)
- Tarscoffsky's The Snackrifice E.P., (Emperor Jones, twelve inch, 2007)
- Kufr, (self-released compact disc, 2007)
- Sternold the Bachelor or Music 2000 , (self-released compact disc, 2007)
- Nuclear Jazz Holocaust, (self-released compact disc, 2007)
- Prawns, (self-released compact disc, 2007)
- Brown Girl in the Ring, (self-released twelve inch, 2006)
- Bums on a Rock E.P. (AKA "Assassin Strikes in China Town"), (Flitwick Records, seven-inch, 2006)
- Frederick the Great of Prussia's Second Hard Album (unpublished), (self-released cassette, 2005)
- Prawns, (Junior Aspirin Records, twelve inch/self-released compact disc, 2004/2005)
- Kit, (Hook or Crook Records, compact disc, 2004/2005)
- KIT, (self-released compact disc, 2004)
- The Rocket Breaks Down, (Pecan Crazy Records, compact disc, 2003/2004)
- Exciting New Venue For Soccer and Execution of Women E.P., (SDZ Records, seven-inch, 2003/2004)

Songs Appearing on Compilations:

- "Maureen" on Flottante Tension D'Eclipse, (LP, SDZ Records, 2010)
- "Your English" on Remove Celebrity Centre, (CD, Junior Aspirin Records, 2006)
- "A Devil in the Woods" (Gun Club) on Salvo of 24 Gunshots - Tribute To Gun Club, (LP/CD, Unrecording Records, 2005)
- "If Every Day Was Like Christmas / Obey" on Get Thee Behind Me Santa (CD, Puppy Dog Records, 2002)
- "Only a dream" on Fruit Machines, (CD, Blang records, 2005)
- "Hitlers and Churchills" on Sonic protest, (CD Sonic Protest, 2006)

=== The Male Nurse ===
Male Nurse featured Country Teasers regulars Alan Crichton, Eck King, Alastair MacKinven and Lawrence Worthington as well as Keith Farquhar on vocals. The band recorded two Peel Sessions, three singles and appeared on the Guided Missile Records compilation Hits and Missiles. The Male Nurse's output was marked by heavy influence of Mark E. Smith's, The Fall.

Releases:

- G-D-R, (Guided Missile Recordings, seven-inch, 1997)
- My Own Private Patrick Swayze, (Guided Missile Recordings, seven-inch, 1997)
- Magic Circle in the Sky/ what does woman want?, (Guided Missile Recordings, seven-inch, 1997)
- Gilded Lil/ The male Nurse, (stupid cat, seven-inch split, 2000)

Also the Male nurse Cdr self-released (Trade apartment CD)1998 and 2007.

=== The Beale ===
Active between 2000 and 2007, The Beale consisted of Adrian Shaw (of The Teenbeat), Ben Wallers, Leighton Crook (Country Teasers/Rebel drummer), Paul Kearney (owner of Guided Missile Recordings) Peter Hart and Ben Pestell. They released a six-song mini-album titled "21 Years in Kranj", two singles for Guided Missile, and appeared on four compilations.

=== Skills on Ampex ===
Skills on Ampex is a joint project between The Invisible Hand, a tapes project by artist (and Teaser) Robert McNeill, and The Rebel/Benedict R. Wallers.

=== The Stallion ===
The Stallion originated as a musical entity composed of Wallers and Country Teasers guitarist Alastair J. R. MacKinven, which specialized in covers.

=== The Company ===
The company is a London recording project involving Amir Shoat and Ben Wallers. Between Autumn 2001 and Spring 2002 they recorded a 99-song album which was then distilled into a twelve-track 12" LP in 2007 and released as Side Three of The Moon on Difficult Time in Mental Jail Records

=== The Black Poodle ===
At the turn of the century Ben Wallers was also the vocalist in The Black Poodle who played regular concerts at The Foundry in Old Street, London. The band was the brainchild of Joel Cahen and Amir Shoat, who invited Wallers to collaborate at the concerts by improvising on vocals, guitar and saxophone, which material they would manipulate live.

=== The Devil ===
A three-piece group led by Wallers that has only gigged occasionally during the 2000s. They released an album, The Devil, in 2013.
