= List of Finnish films of the 2000s =

A list of films produced in Finland ordered by year of release. For an alphabetical list of Finnish films see Category:Finnish films

Name	Director	Cast	Genre	Comments
2000
Bad Luck Love	Olli Saarela	Jorma Tommila, Tommi Eronen, Maria Järvenhelmi		
Badding	Markku Pölönen	Janne Reinikainen, Karoliina Blackburn	Biography	
Restless	Aku Louhimies	Mikko Nousiainen, Laura Malmivaara	Drama	
Lakeuden kutsu	Ilkka Vanne	Kari Väänänen, Mari Rantasila		
Hurmaava joukkoitsemurha	Ere Kokkonen	Heikki Kinnunen, Tom Pöysti, Sari Siikander, Santeri Kinnunen	Comedy	
Lomalla	Aleksi Mäkelä	Juha Veijonen, Outi Mäenpää, Kärt Tomingas		kuvattiin Mallorcassa
Geography of Fear	Auli Mantila	Tanjalotta Räikkä, Leea Klemola	Thriller	
2001
The River	Jarmo Lampela			
The Classic	Kari Väänänen	Martti Suosalo	Drama, Comedy	
Rentun Ruusu	Timo Koivusalo	Martti Suosalo, Ilkka Koivula	Biography	
Ponterosa	Mika Kemmo, Pasi Kemmo	Heikki Paavilainen, Timo Julkunen, Tony Halme	Comedy	
Rölli ja metsänhenki	Olli Saarela	Allu Tuppurainen, Maria Järvenhelmi	Children's, Fantasy	
Emmauksen tiellä	Markku Pölönen	Puntti Valtonen	Comedy	
Minä ja Morrison	Lenka Hellstedt	Irina Björklund, Samuli Edelmann	Drama	
Joutilaat	Susanna Helke, Virpi Suutari	Tero Kinnunen, Jaakko Lähdesmäki, Harri Moilanen	Documentary	
Cyclomania	Simo Halinen	Lauri Nurkse, Elena Leeve, Tommi Mujunen		
Frankenström	Markus Staaf	Niklas Österholm, Aki Hahto, Esa Uusimaa	Comedy, Horror	
Ken tulta pyytää	Sakari Kirjavainen	Taisto Reimaluoto, Anna-Maija Valonen	Comedy	
Blatnoi Mir	Jouni Hiltunen	Valeri Balin, Andrei Shudarikov, Mihail Buharov	Documentary	
Cleaning Up!			Documentary	
Maa			Documentary	
Tango Kabaree				
Leijat Helsingin yllä	Peter Lindholm	Pirkka-Pekka Petelius, Paavo Kerosuo, Pekka Strang	Drama	
Young Love	Arto Lehkamo	Saija Lentonen, Joonas Nordman	Drama	
2002
Mies vailla menneisyyttä	Aki Kaurismäki	Markku Peltola, Kati Outinen	Drama	
Haaveiden kehä	Matti Ijäs	Sulevi Peltola, Mikko Alanko, Petteri Summanen	Drama	
Kahlekuningas	Arto Koskinen	Miikka Enbuske, Emil Lundberg, Heikki Hela		
Menolippu Mombasaan	Hannu Tuomainen	Antti Tarvainen, Joonas Saartamo, Johanna Rönnlöf	Drama, Comedy	
Hayflower and Quiltshoe	Kaisa Rastimo	Katriina Tavi, Tilda Kiianlehto		
Kymmenen riivinrautaa	Ere Kokkonen	Esko Salminen, Santeri Kinnunen, Kristiina Elstelä		
Kuutamolla	Aku Louhimies	Minna Haapkylä, Anna-Leena Härkönen	Drama	
Aleksis Kiven elämä	Jari Halonen	Marko Tiusanen	Biographical film	
The Man Without a Past	Aki Kaurismäki	Markku Peltola, Kati Outinen and Juhani Niemelä	Comedy-drama	Second installment in Kaurismäki's Finland trilogy
2003
Nousukausi	Johanna Vuoksenmaa	Petteri Summanen, Tiina Lymi, Kari-Pekka Toivonen	Drama	
Raid	Tapio Piirainen	Kai Lehtinen	Crime	
Eila	Jarmo Lampela	Sari Mällinen, Ilkka Koivula, Hannes Suominen, Kristiina Halkola, Kari Hietalahti		
Helmiä ja sikoja	Perttu Leppä	Mikko Leppilampi, Laura Birn, Amanda Pilke		
Pahat pojat	Aleksi Mäkelä	Peter Franzén, Niko Saarela, Lauri Nurkse, Jasper Pääkkönen	Crime, Drama	
Sotalapset	Erja Dammert	Marja Kinos, Pentti Käppi, Irmeli Heimo	Documentary	
Vieraalla maalla	Ilkka Vanne	Ville Haapasalo, Irina Björklund	Comedy	
Mosku – lajinsa viimeinen	Tapio Suominen	Kai Lehtinen		
Hymypoika	JP Siili	Reino Nordin, Jussi Nikkilä, Jarkko Niemi		
Sibelius	Timo Koivusalo	Martti Suosalo, Heikki Nousiainen, Miina Turunen, Seela Sella	Biographical film	
Kuoleman kasvot			Documentary	
Huutajat – Screaming Men			Documentary	
Espoon viimeinen neitsyt	Hanna Maylett	Saila Laakkonen, Hennariikka Laaksola	Drama	
Kohtalon kirja	Tommi Lepola, Tero Molin	Juha-Pekka Mikkola, Johanna Kokko	Fantasy, Action, Horror, Western	Independent-elokuva
2004
Vares – yksityisetsivä	Aleksi Mäkelä	Juha Veijonen	Thriller	
Kukkia ja sidontaa	Janne Kuusi	Outi Mäenpää, Simo Routarinne, Kari-Pekka Toivonen	Drama	
Lapsia ja aikuisia	Aleksi Salmenperä	Minna Haapkylä, Kari-Pekka Toivonen		
Koirankynnen leikkaaja	Markku Pölönen	Peter Franzén, Taisto Reimaluoto, Ahti Kuoppala		
Keisarikunta	Pekka Mandart	Mikko Leppilampi, Maria Ylipää, Mikko Nousiainen		
Levottomat 3	Minna Virtanen	Mi Grönlund, Nicke Lignell, Jasper Pääkkönen	Drama	
Juoksuhaudantie	Veikko Aaltonen	Eero Aho, Kari Väänänen, Esko Pesonen	Drama	
Etulinjan edessä	Åke Lindman	Tobias Zilliacus, Ilkka Heiskanen, Christoffer Westerlund	War	
Pelikaanimies	Liisa Helminen	Kari Ketonen, Roni Haarakangas, Inka Nuorgam		
Melancholian 3 huonetta	Pirjo Honkasalo		Documentary	
Ystäväni Henry	Auli Mantila	Aleksi Rantanen, Ninni Ahlroth		
Isältä pojalle	Peter Lindholm		Documentary	
Riot On	Kim Finn		Documentary	
Reissu	Rauni Mollberg	Vesa Valtanen, Erkki Hetta, Eija Koskimaa	TV movie	
Uuno Turhapuro – This Is My Life	Ere Kokkonen	Vesa-Matti Loiri		
Lasileuka	Zaida Bergroth	Emilia Sinisalo	Short Film, Drama	
2005
Paha maa	Aku Louhimies	Jasper Pääkkönen, Mikko Leppilampi, Pamela Tola	Drama	
Eläville ja kuolleille	Kari Paljakka	Hannu-Pekka Björkman, Katja Kukkola		
Äideistä parhain	Klaus Härö	Topi Majaniemi, Marjaana Maijala, Esko Salminen	Drama	
Tyttö sinä olet tähti	Dome Karukoski	Pamela Tola, Samuli Vauramo	Drama	
Sen edestään löytää	John Webster	Salon poliisi	Documentary	
Kaksipäisen kotkan varjossa	Timo Koivusalo	Vesa-Matti Loiri, Mikko Leppilampi, Anneli Saaristo		
Kuolleiden talvi	Markus Heiskanen	Pasi Martikainen	Short Film, Horror	
Star Wreck: In the Pirkinning	Timo Vuorensola	Samuli Torssonen, Timo Vuorensola, Antti Satama, Atte Joutsen	Sci-Fi	Independent-elokuvat
FC Venus	Joona Tena	Minna Haapkylä, Laura Malmivaara, Taneli Mäkelä, Petteri Summanen	Sports	
2006
Jadesoturi	Antti-Jussi Annila	Tommi Eronen, Markku Peltola, Krista Kosonen, Zhang Jingchu	Wuxia	
Laitakaupungin valot	Aki Kaurismäki	Janne Hyytiäinen, Ilkka Koivula, Maria Järvenhelmi	Drama	
Keisarin salaisuus	Riina Hyytiä	Mika Ala-Panula, Anna Bentley, Heikki Hilander	Animated	
Kalteva torni	Timo Koivusalo	Martti Suosalo, Liisa Kuoppamäki, Seela Sella, Siiri Suosalo		
Matti	Aleksi Mäkelä	Jasper Pääkkönen	elämänkertaelokuva	
Saippuaprinssi	Janne Kuusi	Mikko Leppilampi, Pamela Tola, Outi Mäenpää		
Unna ja Nuuk	Saara Cantell	Rosa Salomaa, Toni Leppe		
Valkoinen kaupunki	Aku Louhimies	Janne Virtanen, Susanna Anteroinen		
Onni von Sopanen	Johanna Vuoksenmaa	Kaarlo Somerto		
Kenen joukoissa seisot	Jouko Aaltonen		Documentary	
Rock’n Roll Never Dies	Juha Koiranen	Samuli Edelmann		
Kummelin Jackpot	Pekka Karjalainen	Heikki Silvennoinen, Timo Kahilainen, Heikki Hela, Heikki Vihinen	Comedy	
Suden arvoitus	Raimo O. Niemi	Tiia Talvisara, Janne Saksela	Drama, seikkailu	
Pavlovin koirat			Documentary	
Riisuttu mies	Aku Louhimies	Samuli Edelmann, Matleena Kuusniemi, Mikko Kouki, Laura Malmivaara	Drama, Comedy	
2007
Ganes	JP Siili	Eero Milonoff	elämänkertaelokuva	
Musta jää	Petri Kotwica	Outi Mäenpää, Martti Suosalo, Ria Kataja	Drama	
Raja 1918	Lauri Törhönen	Martin Bahne, Minna Haapkylä, Hannu-Pekka Björkman, Tommi Korpela	War	
Joulutarina	Juha Wuolijoki	Hannu-Pekka Björkman, Otto Gustavsson		
Sooloilua	Lauri Nurkse	Saija Lentonen, Kari-Pekka Toivonen		
Miehen työ	Aleksi Salmenperä	Tommi Korpela, Jani Volanen, Maria Heiskanen, Stan Saanila	Drama	
Tali-Ihantala 1944	Åke Lindman	Marcus Groth, Onni Thulesius	War	
Lieksa!	Markku Pölönen	Samuli Vauramo, Sanna-Kaisa Palo		
Yhden tähden hotelli	Ari Matikainen	Jorma Kääriäinen	Documentary	
V2 – Jäätynyt enkeli	Aleksi Mäkelä	Juha Veijonen	Thriller	
2008
Niko – Lentäjän poika	Kari Juusonen, Michael Hegner	Olli Jantunen, Hannu-Pekka Björkman, Vuokko Hovatta, Vesa Vierikko	Animated	
Putoavia enkeleitä	Heikki Kujanpää	Elena Leeve, Tommi Korpela, Elina Knihtilä		
Sauna	AJ Annila	Ville Virtanen, Tommi Eronen, Rain Tolk	Horror	
Tummien perhosten koti	Dome Karukoski	Tommi Korpela, Niilo Syväoja	Drama	
Risto Räppääjä	Mari Rantasila	Niilo Sipilä, Mimmi Lounela	Musical	
Käsky	Aku Louhimies	Samuli Vauramo, Pihla Viitala, Eero Aho		
Palnan tyttäret				
Katastrofin aineksia	John Webster	John Websterin perhe	Documentary	
Kolme viisasta miestä	Mika Kaurismäki	Kari Heiskanen, Pertti Sveholm, Timo Torikka	Drama	
Erottamattomat	Hanna Maylett	Tiina Lymi, Minna Haapkylä, Jorma Tommila, Kaneli Johansson.		
Pyhän kirjan varjo	Arto Halonen	Arto Halonen, Kevin Frazier	Documentary	
Päätalo	Hannu Kahakorpi	Kai Lehtinen	elämänkertaelokuva	
Kummeli Alivuokralainen	Matti Grönberg	Mikko Kivinen, Heikki Silvennoinen, Timo Kahilainen, Heikki Hela, Tuija Ernamo	Comedy	
2009
Black Blooded Brides of Satan	Sami Haavisto	Anne Rajala, Elina Ukkonen, Markus Salo	Horror	
Postia pappi Jaakobille	Klaus Härö	Kaarina Hazard, Heikki Nousiainen	Drama	
Kuulustelu	Jörn Donner	Minna Haapkylä, Hannu-Pekka Björkman, Lauri Nurkse	Drama	
Skavabölen pojat	Zaida Bergroth	Lauri Tilkanen, Iiro Panula	Drama	
Muukalainen	Jukka-Pekka Valkeapää	Pavel Liska, Jorma Tommila, Vitali Bobrov		
Rööperi	Aleksi Mäkelä	Samuli Edelmann, Peter Franzén		
Haarautuvan rakkauden talo	Mika Kaurismäki	Hannu-Pekka Björkman, Elina Knihtilä	Comedy	
Kielletty hedelmä	Dome Karukoski	Amanda Pilke, Marjut Maristo, Joel Mäkinen	Drama	
Täällä Pohjantähden alla	Timo Koivusalo	Ilkka Koivula, Vera Kiiskinen		
Liikkumavara	Annika Grof		Documentary	
Magneettimies	Arto Halonen		Documentary	
Kansakunnan olohuone	Jukka Kärkkäinen		Documentary	
Väärät juuret	Saara Saarela	Pertti Sveholm	Drama	
