= Markus Selin =

Finnish television and film producer

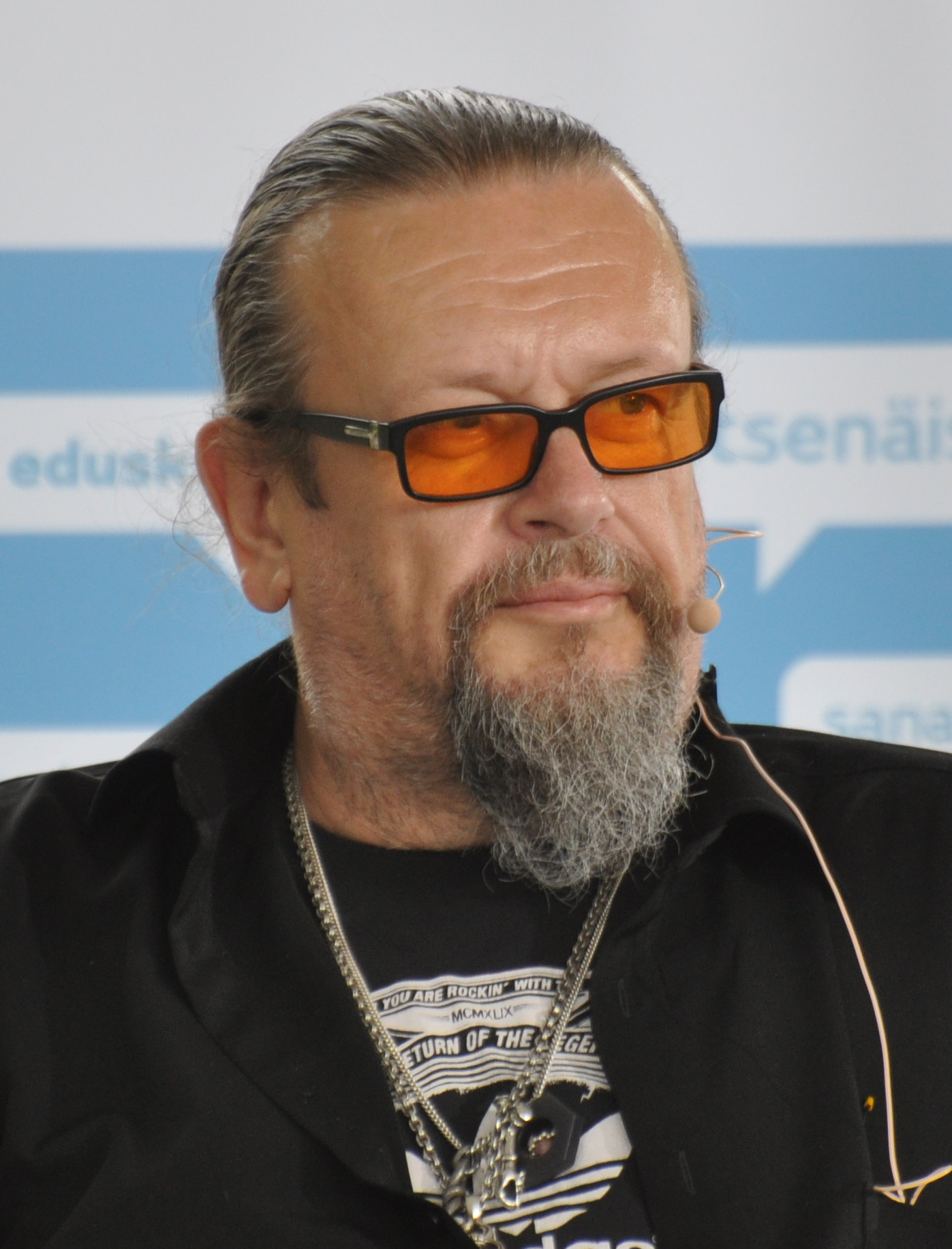
- Born: 16 March 1960 (age 66); Nummela, Vihti, Finland
- Occupation: Producer
- Years active: 1980–present

Markus Selin (born 16 March 1960) is a Finnish television and film producer.

== Career ==
Selin was born in Vihti. His first feature, Born American (Finnish: Jäätävä polte), was conceived in the mid-1980s. At a party in Los Angeles, he was introduced to fellow Finn Renny Harlin. The two collaborated on a script about three Americans vacationing in Finland who cross the border into the Soviet Union. They approached Chuck Norris to star and he initially agreed but later had to pull out after the production was delayed due to financing problems. His son Mike Norris took over the lead. Selin and Harlin funded the first part of production themselves and then shopped around with the resulting 20-minute demo reel. Selin was eventually able to secure co-production financing from the U.S. for what became the most expensive film ever produced in Finland. Under the terms of the deal Selin held on to the Finnish distribution rights. However, upon completion in 1986 the film was banned by the Finnish government, fearing that its anti-Soviet slant might damage bilateral relations. Selin and Harlin started Larmark Productions in order to finance many North American television projects.

Selin and Harlin followed this in 1987 with Wild Force: S.O.P.H.I.A. (a.k.a. I want you to stay) but failed to secure a distributor.

In the early 1990s, Selin formed two companies, Harlin & Selin Productions Oy with his old friend Renny Harlin and his own Solar Films. The first project for these two companies in 1993 was Gladiaattorit, the Finnish version of the hit American television series American Gladiators, produced by Selin, directed by Harlin and co-written by the two friends. This was followed in 1994 by a sketch comedy series called Vintiöt starring Santeri Kinnunen and in the same year a feature called Sunset Riders. The movie was a hit with the critics, winning Finnish Movie Awards for its director Aleksi Mäkelä and its star Juha Veijonen but only performed moderately well at the box office. Numerous television and feature productions followed. In 2006, Selin re-teamed with Harlin to produce a biopic of the Finnish President Gustaf Mannerheim, but the budget projection spiraled, far eclipsing American Born, and coupled with problems with the Finnish government, again, the project was put on hold where it remains indefinitely.

== Filmography ==
- Born American (1985)
- Sunset Riders (1994)
- Kummeli: Kultakuume (1997)
- The Tough Ones (1999)
- Restless (2000)
- The South (2000)
- Me and Morrison (2001)
- Bad Boys (2003)
- Addiction (2004)
- Vares – Private Eye (2004)
- Paha maa (2005)
- Matti (2006)
- Frozen City (2006)
- V2 – Dead Angel (2007)
- The Home of Dark Butterflies (2008)
- Dark Floors (2008)
- The Subtenant (2008)
- Hellsinki (2009)
- The Kiss of Evil (2011)
- Imaginaerum (2012)
- The Grump (2014)
- Wildeye (2015)
- Man and a baby (2017)
- The Renovation (2020)
- Stormskerry Maja (2022)
- The Knocking (2022)
