= Kari Hietalahti =

Finnish actor and screenwriter (born 1964)

Kari-Jukka Hietalahti
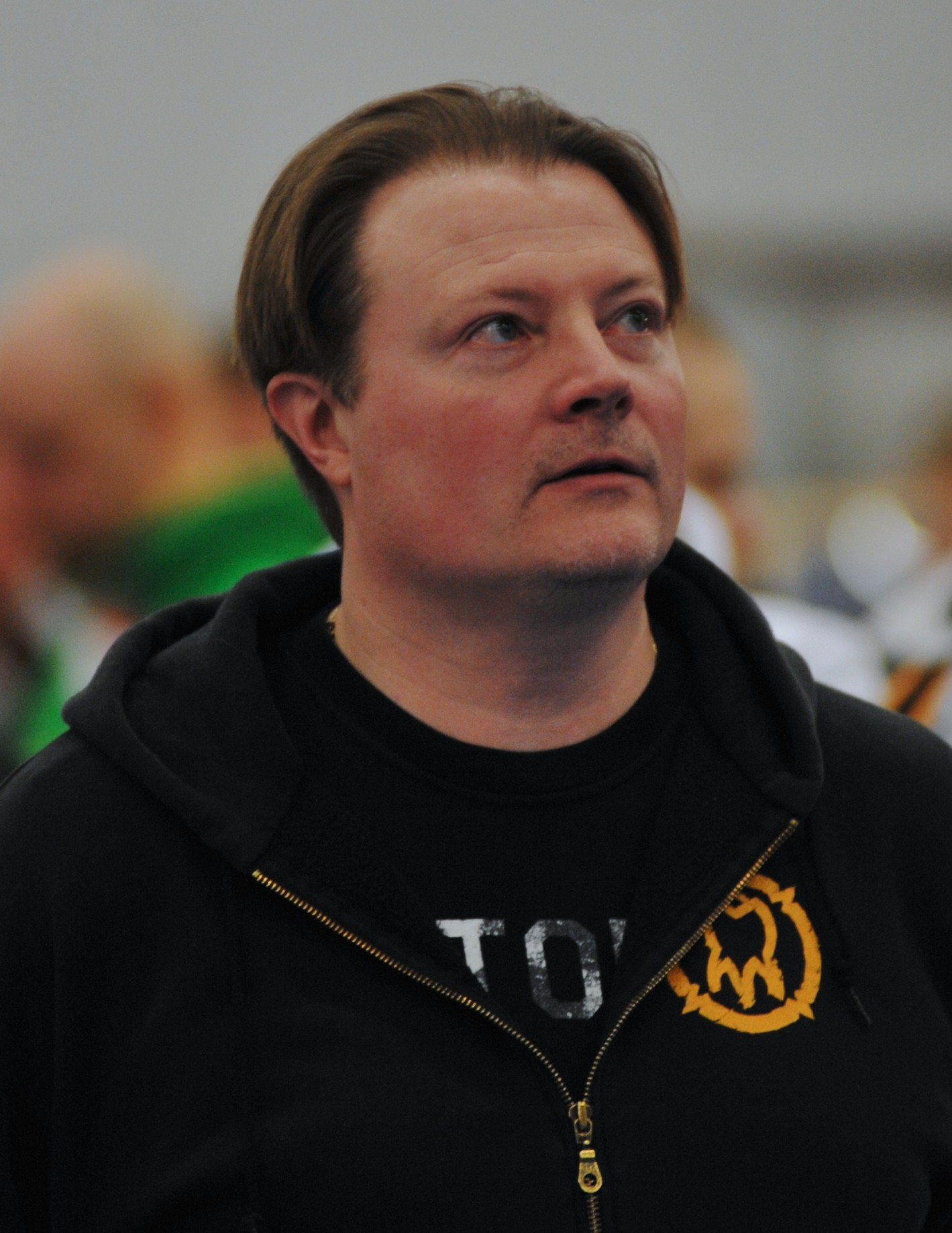
- Hietalahti in 2011
- Born: 13 September 1964 (age 61)
- Occupations: Actor, screenwriter

Kari-Jukka Hietalahti (born 13 September 1964) is a Finnish actor and screenwriter.

== Career ==
Kari Hietalahti is best known for having appeared in several popular Finnish television series, such as Vintiöt, Ihmisten puolue, and Roba, and in films such as Rööperi and Vares: Private Eye. In August 2011, Hietalahti's first book, Kenraali Pancho & Pojat – Suuri kalottikirja, was published.

In 2018, Hietalahti played Jari Aarnio in the crime drama series Keisari Aarnio, which is based on a true story.

== Personal life ==
Hietalahti is married to costume designer Minna Härkönen. They have one son.

== Selected filmography ==
=== Film ===
List of film appearances, with year, title, and role shown
Year	Title	Role	Notes
1997	Kummeli: Kultakuume	Kulokoski	
1999	The Tough Ones	Aune	
2001	Rollo and the Spirit of the Woods	Riitasointu	
2002	Lovers & Leavers	Cheese seller	
2003	Eila	Kai Pylkkänen	
2003	Young Gods	David's father	
2003	Sibelius	Eino Leino	
2003	Bad Boys	Kiosk vendor	
2004	Vares: Private Eye	Tetsuo Sinkkonen	
2005	Promise	Corporal Ville Sorvali	
2006	Matti: Hell Is for Heroes	Hammer	
2006	Man Exposed	Tumppi	
2007	Ganes	Hurme	
2007	V2: Dead Angel	Kullervo "Kulli" Visuri	
2009	Hellsinki	Kari	
2010	Lapland Odyssey	Kittilä's jerk 2	
2011	Body of Water	Koskela	
2012	Once Upon a Time in the North	Vallesmanni	
2013	The Hijack That Went South	Aarno Lamminparras	
2017	Tom of Finland	Sahlin	
2018	The Human Part	Kimmo Hienlahti	
2021	The Potato		
2025	Never Alone	Arno Anthoni	
2026	Red Snow		

=== Television ===
List of television appearances, with year, title, and role shown
Year	Title	Role	Notes
1994–95; 2003	Vintiöt	Various	
1996	Ilman kavaluutta	Pekka Nousu	4 episodes
1996	Peltiheikit	Kaapo Virta	9 episodes
1997	Vuoroin vieraissa	Reijo Remes	12 episodes
1997	Tähtilampun alla	Veikko Timola	10 episodes
1997	Trabant Express		20 episodes
1999	Äkkiä Anttolassa	Various	
1999–2004	Muodollisesti pätevä	Various	10 episodes
2000–04	Kotikatu	Harri Pesonen	8 episodes
2003	Rikospoliisi Maria Kallio	Chief of Staff Petri Puustjärvi	10 episodes
2005	Sincerely Yours in Cold Blood	Pekka Järvinen	1 episode
2006	Mogadishu Avenue	Ingvar Nenonen	6 episodes
2006	Studio Impossible	Various	15 episodes
2006–07	Läpiveto	Various	13 episodes
2007–13	Jefferson Anderson	Various	64 episodes
2008–09	Hymy Pyllyyn	Various	4 episodes
2008–10	Ihmisten puolue	Topi-Petteri Saikkonen	36 episodes
2009	Ihmebantu	Various	7 episodes
2009	JugiStyle	Various	9 episodes
2009–10	Parasta aikaa	Eki	10 episodes
2010	Putous	Various	8 episodes
2010	Yksi lensi yli Marin pesän	Various	3 episodes
2012–17	Kimmo	Nissinen	45 episodes
2012–21	Roba	Arto Mäkelä	51 episodes
2014	Pyjama Party	Examiner	1 episode
2014	Jari ja Kari	Jari	10 episodes
2014–16	Jefferson Anderson 2.5: The Spin-off	Various	35 episodes
2015–16	YleLeaks	Arhippa Korhonen, left / Juhani Käki, center	32 episodes
2018	Deadwind	Louhivuori	6 episodes
2018	Arctic Circle	Arttu Hamari	5 episodes
2018	Keisari Aarnio	Jari Aarnio	10 episodes
2018–19	Sipoon herttua	Pasi Kovalainen	18 episodes
2019	Jarin ja Karin kesäloma	Jari	15 episodes
2019–21	Shadow Lines	Kyösti Saarnio	6 episodes
2020	Perfect Commando	Russian poacher	1 episode
2020	Justimus esittää: Duo	Rehtori	7 episodes
2020	Pohjolan laki	Tuomo Alanko	7 episodes
2021	Pahan väri	Petri Häkkinen	3 episodes
2021	Karuselli	Various	7 episodes
2022	The Man Who Died	Asko	6 episodes
