= Vintiöt =

Finnish television comedy series

- Genre: Sketch comedy
- Directed by: Aleksi Mäkelä
- Starring: Samuli Edelmann; Santeri Kinnunen; Niko Saarela; Janus Hanski; Jussi Chydenius; Kari Hietalahti; Juha Veijonen
- Country of origin: Finland
- Original language: Finnish
- No. of episodes: 39

Original release
- Network: MTV3
- Release: 1994 – 2003

Vintiöt (Finnish for "rascals") is a Finnish television comedy and sketch series. It ran on the MTV3 channel from 1994 to 1995 with a total of 27 episodes. In 2003, the sequel Vintiöt – Ten Years After was released, containing twelve episodes.

== Cast ==
The show featured a cast of well-known Finnish actors, including Samuli Edelmann, Santeri Kinnunen, Niko Saarela, Janus Hanski, Jussi Chydenius, Kari Hietalahti and Juha Veijonen. The show was extremely popular especially among children and teens, resulting in many new phrases becoming common expressions. These included Asiaa! ("This is business!"). The show was written by the actors Hietalahti and Saarela and directed by known Finnish director Aleksi Mäkelä.

== Humour ==
Vintiöt was known for its bizarre characters and absurd humour. Most sketches were simply improvised at the shooting location, with makeshift props and rarely any specially built sets. The show's budget was non-existent. Often the idea of a sketch was the interaction between two absurd characters. Some sketches were also "accelerated" in post production to give the characters a nasal sound. Most often the characters would appear in multiple sketches and episodes, although there were no continuous plot lines. There were also one-off sketches and characters.

== Famous sketches and characters ==
=== Original opening credits ===
The show's original opening credits showed the cast as crew members on a Soviet submarine, performing various tasks and generally running around the mostly dark boat in a frenzy. Incidentally, the same boat was later used in the Harrison Ford film K-19: The Widowmaker.

=== The Estonian Exercise Program ===
A sports instructor (Hietalahti) greets the audience cheerfully in fake Estonian and proceeds to present the "warmup" exercise, often very ridiculous. He is backed up by a group of at least four others. The main punchline of the sketch is that the instructor (called Kaido Kuukap) counts from one to four in a funny "Estonian" way (Yks, kaks, koli, neli).

Often he would also deliver short monologues of nonsense while the other members of his team did something incredibly silly in the background. During early sketches they used Ennio Morricone's song "My Name Is Nobody" as a background music. Later they used a song specially composed for the show, but the original song was sometimes played briefly.

=== Rampe and Sirkka ===
A married couple (played by Edelmann and Hietalahti) argue a lot, often the target being an orange Opel Kadett car from the seventies. Several sketches end with either one of them driving the car, and then they show a shot of the same car crashing into a gravel pit. (The same film clip is always used.) The characters' names are also very stereotypical middle-class Finnish names.

=== Nakkikaverit (The Sausage Pals) ===
This sketch revolved around a tiny hot-dog stand selling Finnish meat pies and hamburgers. The small stand had a staff of three chefs, the manager and a female attendant Mirjami (played by Hietalahti in drag). Only the customers' hands were ever shown, and their speech was never heard. Often the character Mirjami had a one-way dialogue with the customer while the others just argued in the background. Most sketches ended with Mirjami declaring "Now you're gonna get punched!"

=== Varjomiehet (The Silhouette Men) ===
Two men would walk in a dark street and look through a curtained window to see something terrible happening inside. (A person getting stabbed or such). The pair would rush inside only to find two men doing something bizarre at the window. (Like vacuuming each other's back.)

=== Rane ja Keravan kollit (Rane and the Kerava Tomcats) ===
Rane (Edelmann) is a young man who speaks with an incredibly nasal voice and brags continually to his friends about his adventures with women and trouble with police. His friends are often awed by Rane. In the end of each sketch they would kick at a concrete wall, repeating "Asiaa!" (The show's perhaps most famous punchline.)

=== Moilanen ===
Mr. Moilanen (Hietalahti) visits his neighbour, usually driving the poor man crazy. He is most recognizable for his tone of laughing.

=== Armas Tanska ja Charme (Armas Tanska and Charme) ===
Armas Tanska is a crazy man who has a large leather mitten as a "pet" (called "Charme"). Mr. Tanska keeps talking to the mitten in his hand in a high-pitched voice and usually bothers everyone around him.

=== Tervasaaren kesäteatteri (Tervasaari Summer Theatre) ===
Two men perform makeshift theatre for an audience of one (sometimes two or even three or four). All plays have essentially the same plot. One man irritates the other and then the other (Hietalahti) takes out an imaginary JaTiMatic submachine gun and strafes the other man. He immediately regrets and soon gets arrested. After this he announces intermission. (This is also the oldest Vintiöt sketch.)

=== Hundkarusellen (The Dog Carousel) ===
Two men with very long blond hair answer the phone in their studio and talk about dogs in Swedish. (The second official language of Finland and compulsory at all education levels.) Their pronunciation and language skills in general are very bad, which is the main joke of the entire sketch.

=== Kyttäruutu (The Cop TV) ===
The crime reporter Sakari Kaulaote (Sakari Neckgrip) interviews victims of various crimes.

=== Kesämies (The Summer Man) ===
The Summer Man (Hietalahti) is a slick-haired man who appears in various sketches. Often he just recites things he is allowed and not allowed to do in a nasal voice.

=== Tourists returning home ===
In this sketch a middle-class couple returns home from a cruise to the Estonian capital city of Tallinn, which is a popular place to visit by the Finns, mostly because you can buy cheap alcohol and fake products there. The couple proceeds to unpack their shopping - a pirate version of the movie Häjyt featuring Edelmann, one of the show's actors, two cartons of cigarettes (one has a piece of wood inside and the other one has exploding cigarettes.) Often cursing because they have lost so much money (€3, in fact) they open a bottle of vodka and lose their eyesight - the bottle was filled with poisonous methanol.
