= The Knocking =

2022 Finnish film by Max Seeck and Joonas Pajunen

- Film poster
- Finnish: Koputus
- Directed by: Max Seeck; Joonas Pajunen
- Written by: Max Seeck; Joonas Pajunen
- Produced by: Jukka Helle; Markus Selin; Hanna Virolainen
- Starring: Inka Kallén; Saana Koivisto; Pekka Strang
- Cinematography: Matti Eerikäinen
- Edited by: Joona Louhivuori
- Music by: Tuomas Kantelinen
- Production company: Solar Films
- Distributed by: Nordisk Film
- Release dates: 9 October 2022 (Sitges Film Festival, Spain); 22 February 2023 (Finland); 24 March 2023 (Cleveland International Film Festival, United States)
- Running time: 92 min
- Country: Finland
- Languages: Finnish; Swedish
- Box office: $566,906

The Knocking (Finnish: Koputus) is a 2022 Finnish supernatural horror drama film written and directed by Max Seeck and Joonas Pajunen. It tells the story of three adult siblings who go examine their late parents' house in the middle of a forest. The film's cast includes Inka Kallén, Saana Koivisto and Pekka Strang.

== Plot ==
A dilapidated detached house is located in the heart of the forest in Sydänmaa; the childhood home of the now grown-up main characters, Mikko (Pekka Strang), Maria (Inka Kallén) and Matilda (Saana Koivisto), to which they return years later to settle their parents' estate. The house and the forest are overshadowed by a dark history: 15 years earlier, the father (Niko Saarela) was found brutally murdered in the house, the mother (Olga Temonen) was declared missing at the time, and the youngest of the children, Matilda, was wheeled into a small cage in the corner of the bedroom. When they arrive, they notice that the forest makes them behave strangely.

== Cast ==
- Inka Kallén as Maria
- Linnea Skog as young Maria
- Saana Koivisto as Matilda
- Hilma Temonen as young Matilda
- Pekka Strang as Mikko
- Kristian Stierncreutz as young Mikko
- Olga Temonen as the mother
- Niko Saarela as the father
- Janina Berman as old lady
- Mikko Leppilampi as lawyer

== Release ==
The Knocking had its first screening at the Sitges Film Festival on October 9, 2022. In Finland, the film was released in cinemas on February 22, 2023. In the United States, the film premiered at the Cleveland International Film Festival on March 24, 2023.

In September 2022, the film's distribution rights had been sold to more than 70 countries, including Germany, Austria, Switzerland, France, Indonesia, Taiwan and Latin America.

== See also ==
- Hatching (film)
- The Twin (2022 film)
