= Jasper Pääkkönen =

Finnish actor (born 1980)

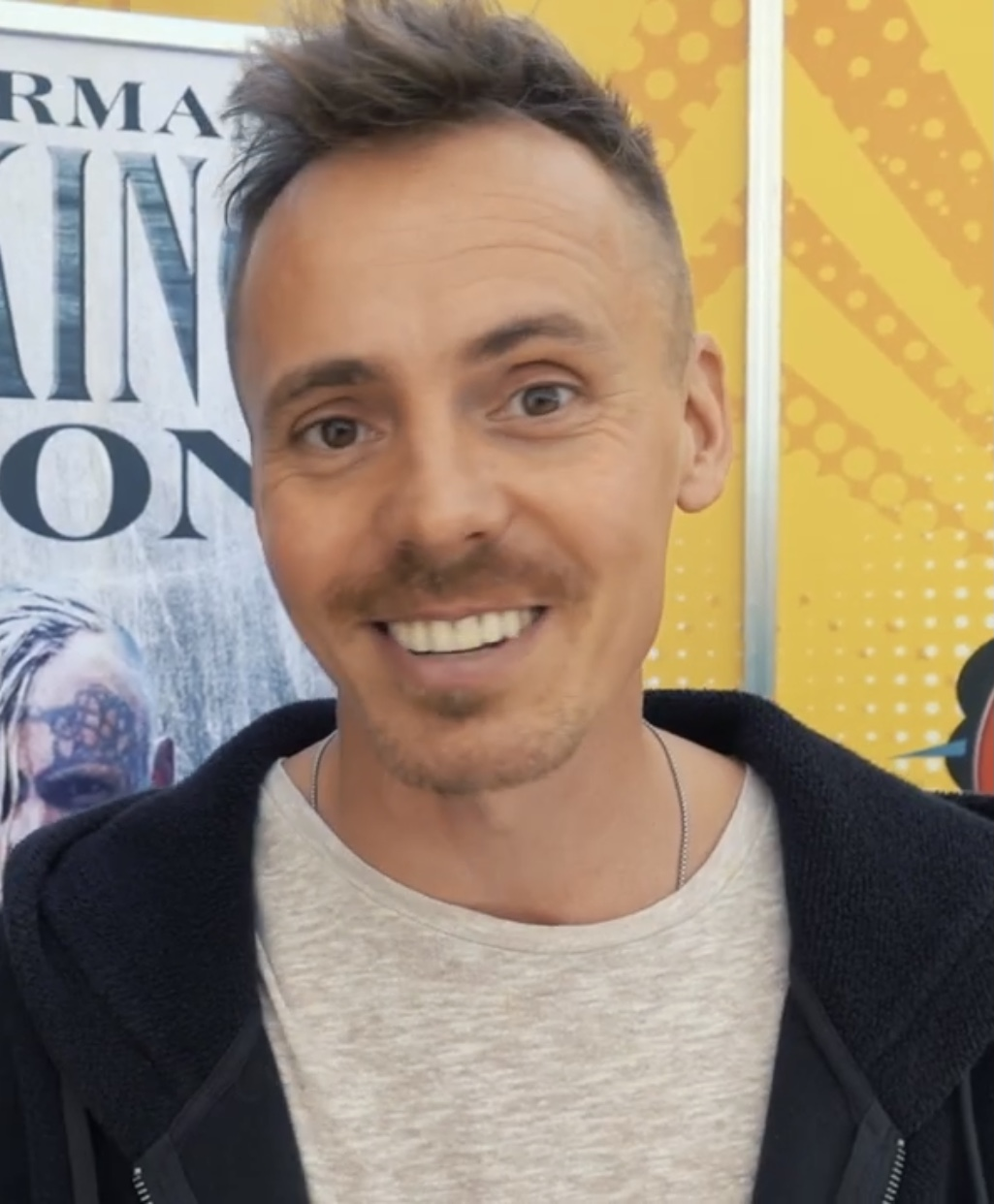
- Pääkkönen in 2022
- Born: Joona Jasper Pääkkönen; 15 July 1980 (age 46); Helsinki, Finland
- Occupation: Actor
- Years active: 1988–present
- Spouse: Alexandra Escat (m. 2017)
- Children: 2

Joona Jasper Pääkkönen (Finnish pronunciation: [ˈjoːnɑ ˈjɑsper ˈpæːkːønen]; born 15 July 1980) is a Finnish film actor.

Following a two-decade-plus career in Finnish movies, Pääkkönen's international breakthrough role came in 2015 in the historical drama television series Vikings (2016–2018; 2020) as Halfdan the Black. His next roles were in Spike Lee's comedy-drama film BlacKkKlansman (2018) and in the war drama film Da 5 Bloods (2020).

== Early life ==
Pääkkönen was born in Helsinki, the son of actor Seppo Pääkkönen and Virve Havelin. His uncle Antti Pääkkönen is also an actor, and is a prolific voice actor. Already as a child, Pääkkönen was a theater assistant and attended Kallio Upper Secondary School of Performing Arts in Kallio, Helsinki. When Pääkkönen was 17, he spent a year in Maryland as an exchange student at Baltimore's Owings Mills High School during the 1997–98 school year.

== Career ==
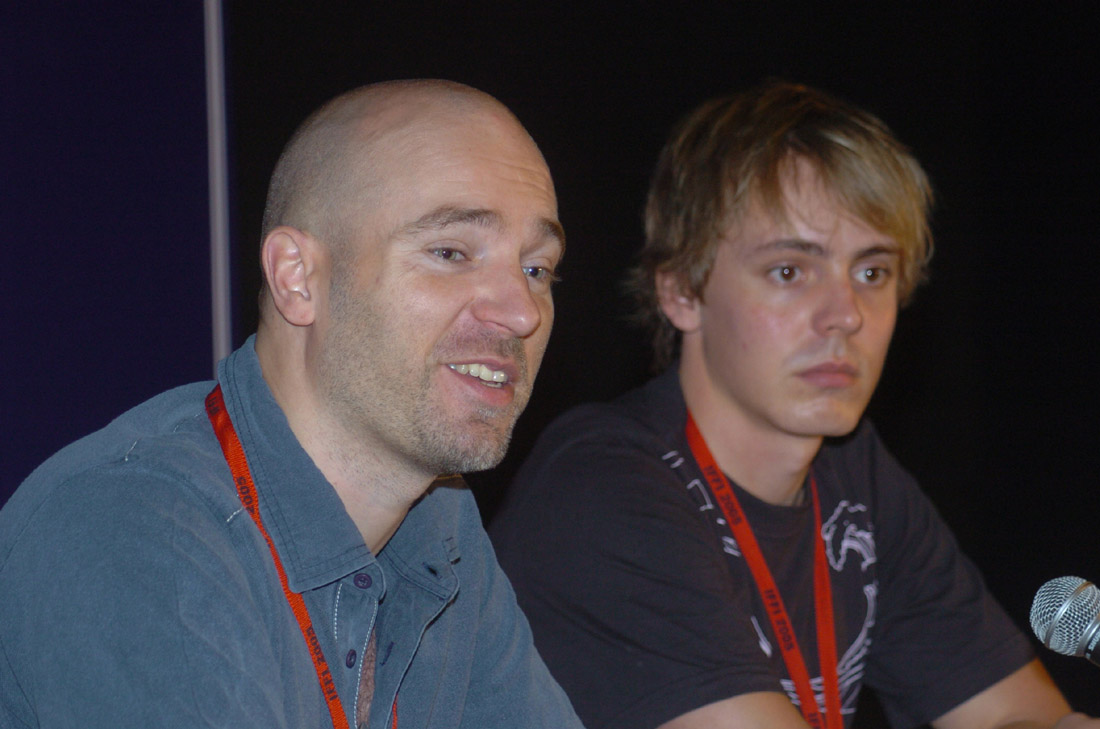
Aku Louhimies, the director of Frozen Land, and Pääkkönen in 2005

Pääkkönen's first film role was in The Glory and Misery of Human Life from 1988, when he was seven years old. He became famous as Saku Salin in the Finnish television soap opera Salatut elämät (1999–2002). According to a calculation published by Finnish tabloid Ilta-Sanomat, Pääkkönen is "the most profitable film actor in Finland" for having starred in numerous box office hits during his career. Many of Pääkkönen's films have made #1 at the Finnish box office, including Bad Boys, which is one of the most successful Finnish films at the national box office of all time. Other of Pääkkönen's commercial and critical successes include Frozen Land (2005), Matti: Hell Is for Heroes (2006), Lapland Odyssey (2010) and Heart of a Lion (2013).

Jasper Pääkkönen in 2026.

For his role in Bad Boys, Pääkkönen was given the Best Actor Award in the Brussels International Independent Film Festival. He has earned international praise from film critic Michael Giltz from the Huffington Post, who called the actor "handsome and compelling" in his role in Lapland Odyssey. Film critic Leslie Felperin from Variety named Pääkkönen a "rising thesp, showing impressive range" in his starring role in Matti. In 2006 the European Film Promotion introduced Pääkkönen as the Shooting Star of Finland at the Berlin International Film Festival.

In 2013, Pääkkönen starred in Finnish drama film Heart of a Lion that earned him his first Jussi Award for Best Supporting Actor. In 2015, Pääkkönen was cast in the fourth season of the History Channel TV series Vikings as Halfdan the Black.

Pääkkönen co-starred as a KKK member in Spike Lee's drama BlacKkKlansman, which premiered at the Cannes Film Festival and was released on 10 August 2018. He starred in Lee's 2020 Netflix production Da 5 Bloods.

=== Other work ===
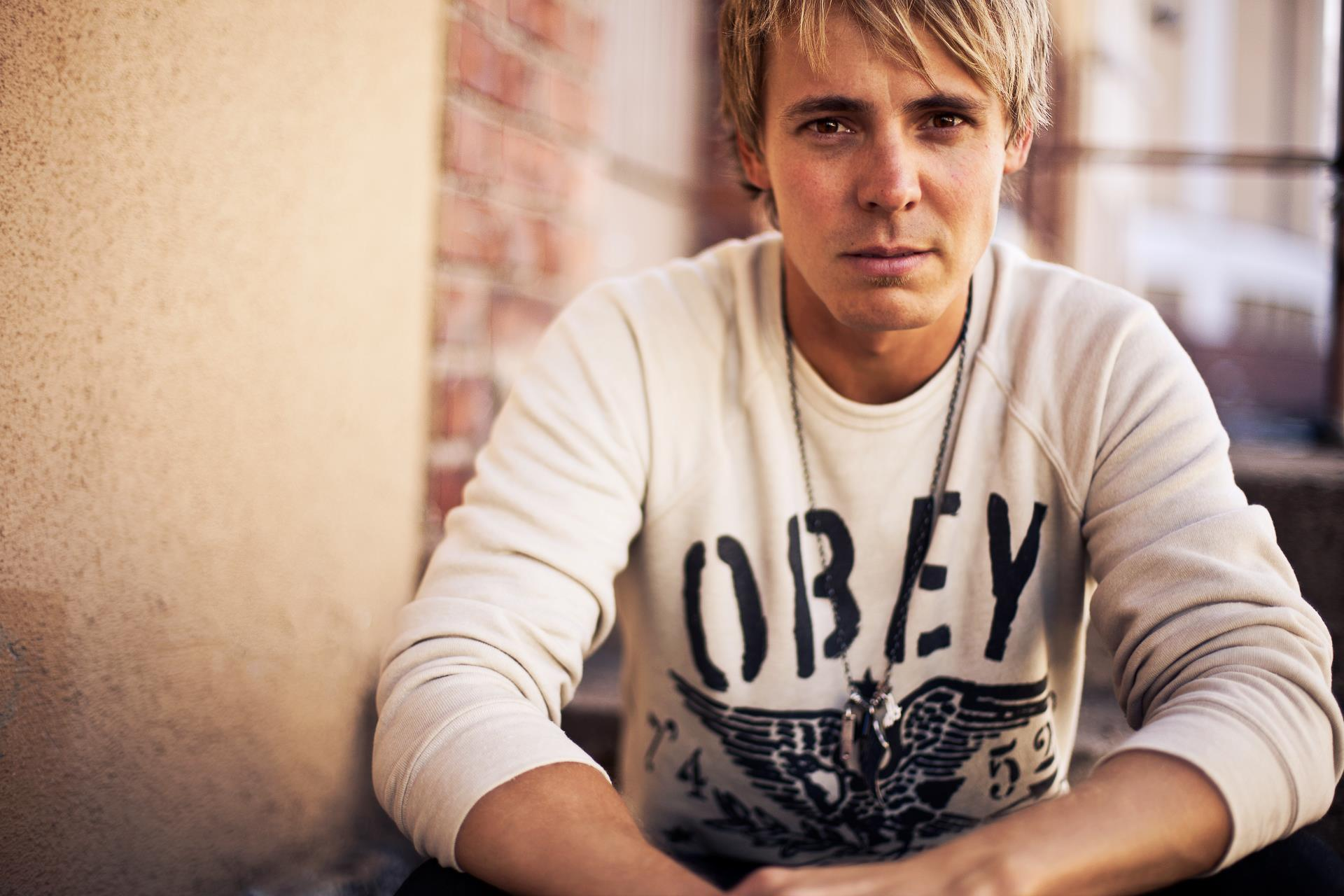
Jasper Pääkkönen in 2012

Pääkkönen is a well known poker player, taking home 1st place in the PAF Poker Challenge 2006 in Mariehamn, Åland, winning 15,000 Euros. In 2009 Pääkkönen founded the Pokerisivut.com poker magazine together with film producer Markus Selin. In 2010 Pokerisivut.com was awarded Best Overall Affiliate at the London 2010 iGB Affiliate Awards. The magazine ended publication in 2010, due to a new Finnish lottery law.

Pääkkönen is a member of the Vision fly fishing world team and has appeared on fly fishing TV shows and DVDs as a celebrity guest. Pääkkönen is also known as the protector of endangered fish species of Finland (especially salmon). He has also founded and is one of the owners of Superflies.com, which sells a selection of flies curated by Pääkkönen and raises funds for endangered native fish populations. Pääkkönen has also begun an entrepreneurship with MP Antero Vartia. They built a large sauna and restaurant complex called Löyly at the shore of Hernesaari, Helsinki which cost €6 million to build. Pääkkönen is one of the founders of Röykkä Invest Oy, in whose name the former Nummela Sanatorium, located in the Röykkä village in Nurmijärvi, was bought for €1.5 million. Pääkkönen has announced a plan to turn the former sanatorium into a hotel.

== Personal life ==
Since 2017, Pääkkönen has been married to Spanish-Filipino model Alexandra Escat. The couple had a daughter on Christmas Day 2021. Pääkkönen announced the birth of their second child son in January 2024.

== Filmography ==
Year	Title	Role	Director	Notes
1988	The Glory and Misery of Human Life	Arvi Hongisto	Matti Kassila	
2003	Bad Boys	Eero Takkunen	Aleksi Mäkelä	
2004	Addiction	Aleksi	Minna Virtanen	
2004	Vares: Private Eye	Jarmo	Aleksi Mäkelä	
2005	Frozen Land	Niko Smolander	Aku Louhimies	
2006	Matti: Hell Is for Heroes	Matti Nykänen	Aleksi Mäkelä	
2007	V2: Dead Angel (Vares 2)	Dante Hell	Aleksi Mäkelä	
2008	Moomin and Midsummer Madness	Moomintroll (Finnish voice)	Maria Lindberg	
2008	Kummeli Alivuokralainen	Kikke	Matti Grönberg	
2009	Hellsinki	Korppu	Aleksi Mäkelä	
2010	Moomins and the Comet Chase	Moomintroll (Finnish voice)	Maria Lindberg	
2010	Lapland Odyssey	Kapu	Dome Karukoski	
2011	The Kiss of Evil (Vares 3)	Kyypakkaus	Anders Engström	
2011	Vares – Huhtikuun tytöt The Girls of April (Vares 4)	Kyypakkaus	Lauri Törhönen	
2011	Vares – Sukkanauhakäärme Garter Snake (Vares 5)	Kyypakkaus	Lauri Törhönen	
2012	Naked Harbour	Anders	Aku Louhimies	
2012	Vares – Uhkapelimerkki Gambling Chip (Vares 7)	Kyypakkaus	Lauri Törhönen	
2012	Vares – Pimeyden tango Tango of Darkness (Vares 8)	Kyypakkaus	Lauri Törhönen	
2013	Heart of a Lion	Harri	Dome Karukoski	Won the Jussi Award for Best Supporting Actor
2015	Vares – Sheriffi The Sheriff (Vares 9)	Kyypakkaus	Hannu Salonen	
2016	Jet Trash	Mike	Charles Henri Belleville	
2018	BlacKkKlansman	Felix Kendrickson	Spike Lee	
2020	Da 5 Bloods	Seppo	Spike Lee	
2021	Omerta 6/12	Max Tanner	Aku Louhimies	
2024	Vares X (Vares 10)	Kyypakkaus	Tuukka Temonen	

== Television credits ==
Year	Title	Role	Notes
1999–2002	Salatut elämät	Saku Salin	Regular role; 387 episodes
2003	Kaunis mies	Joonatan Kuusisto	
2003	Irtiottoja - Fragments	Johnny	
2016–2020	Vikings	Halfdan the Black	Main cast (seasons 4–5); Guest (season 6)
2019	Pihlajasatu	Saku Salin	4 episodes
2019	The Dark Tower	Marten Broadcloak	Unaired pilot
