= Teemu Lehtilä =

Finnish actor

Teemu Aleksi Lehtilä
- Born: 27 November 1966 (age 59); Kokemäki, Finland
- Occupation: Actor

Teemu Aleksi Lehtilä (born 27 November 1966, in Kokemäki) is a Finnish actor. He studied in the Department of Acting at the University of Tampere and graduated in 1990. He has acted in the Municipal Theatre of Jyväskylä and Tampere Theatre (including the role of Romeo in Shakespeare's Romeo and Juliet) as well as for television, where he is best known as narcissist and antagonist Aaro Vaalanne in the Finnish soap opera Salatut elämät. He acted in Salatut elämät during the production period 2004–2006 and returned to the series from spring 2007 to summer 2009, when he also played the character of Eero Vanala, Aaro's good-natured twin brother, as well as the role of Eero and Aaro's father. Lehtilä returned to the role of Aaro in 2012. In the autumn of 2026, Lehtilä took on his fourth Salatut Elämät role as a Norwegian neurosurgeon and Aaro and Eero's long-lost brother, Iiro Hansen.

== Filmography ==
=== Films ===
- Esa ja Vesa – auringonlaskun ratsastajat (1994)
- Häjyt (1999)
- Young Love (2001)
- Niin lähellä, niin kaukana (2003)
- Vares 2 – Jäätynyt Enkeli (2007)

=== Television series ===
- Trabant Express (1997)
- Metsolat (1995)
- Samppanjaa ja vaahtokarkkeja (1995)
- Pimeän hehku (1996)
- Elämän suola (1997–1998)
- Tumma ja hehkuva veri (1998)
- Tuliportaat (1998)
- Klubi (1998–1999)
- Äkkiä Anttolassa (1999)
- Kirjava silta (2000)
- Hovimäki (2003)
- Salatut elämät (Aaro Vaalanne, 2004–2006, 2007, 2009, 2012, 2015, 2017–), (Eero Vanala, 2007–2009), (Aaro's and Eero's father), 2009)
- Kotikatu (2010)
- Pirunpelto (2013)
- Korpelan kujanjuoksu (2016)
