= The Kiss of Evil =

2011 film

- Original Finnish film poster
- Directed by: Anders Engström
- Written by: Anders Engström; Mika Karttunen; Kata Kärkkäinen
- Produced by: Jukka Helle; Markus Selin
- Starring: Antti Reini
- Cinematography: Jari Mutikainen
- Release date: 6 January 2011
- Running time: 94 minutes
- Country: Finland
- Language: Finnish

The Kiss of Evil (Finnish: Vares – Pahan suudelma) is a 2011 Finnish crime film directed by Anders Engström. It is the third installment of the Vares film series and a sequel to previous films Vares: Private Eye (2004) and V2: Dead Angel (2007), but it is the first film to feature Antti Reini as the main character Jussi Vares while in earlier films Vares was played by Juha Veijonen.

== Cast ==
- Antti Reini as Jussi Vares
- Matti Onnismaa as Pastori Alanen
- Eppu Salminen as Juhani Luusalmi
- Jasper Pääkkönen as Kyypakkaus
- Mikko Leppilampi as Ruuhio
- Anu Sinisalo as Laila
- Ville Virtanen as Arto
- Mikko Nousiainen as Lahtipoika
- Maria Järvenhelmi as Anna Huttunen
- Svante Martin as Paavo
- Outi Mäenpää as Asta Malmstén
