= Oulu Airport =

Oulu Airport Oulun lentoasema

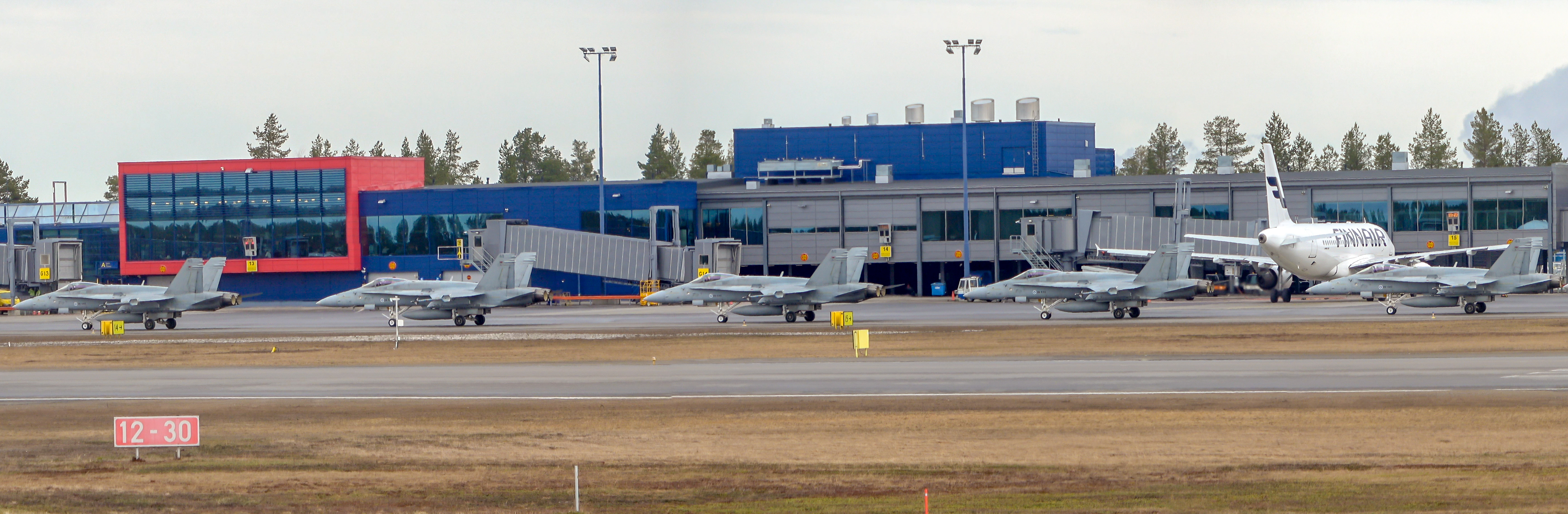
- IATA: OUL; ICAO: EFOU

Summary
- Airport type: Public
- Operator: Finavia
- Serves: Oulu
- Location: Oulunsalo, Oulu, Finland
- Opened: 30 June 1953
- Elevation AMSL: 14.6 m (48 ft)
- Coordinates: 64°55′42″N 025°22′27″E
- Website: www.finavia.fi/en/oulu/

Map
- Location within Finland

Runways
Direction	Length		Surface
Direction	m	ft	Surface
12/30	2,501	8,203	Asphalt

Statistics (2023)
- Passengers: 554,096
- Passenger change 2022–23: ▼ −12.3%
- Aircraft movements: 5,994

Oulu Airport (IATA: OUL, ICAO: EFOU; Finnish: Oulun lentoasema, Swedish: Uleåborgs flygplats) is located in Oulu, Finland, 5.7 NM (10.6 km; 6.6 mi) south-west of the city centre. The airport is the third busiest airport in Finland after Helsinki-Vantaa and Rovaniemi airport, as measured by the number of passengers and landings. There are around 10 daily flights to Helsinki. Oulu Airport is also extensively used by the Finnish Air Force for training purposes and the managing body of the airport is Finavia. Oulu Airport has offered free wireless network access for passengers since May 2007.

== History ==
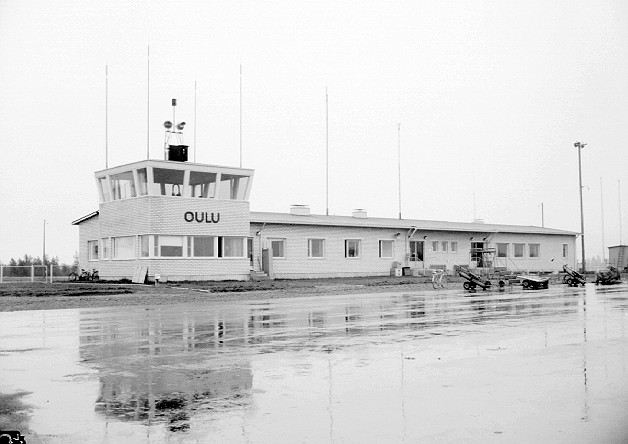
Old terminal and ATC building in 1958

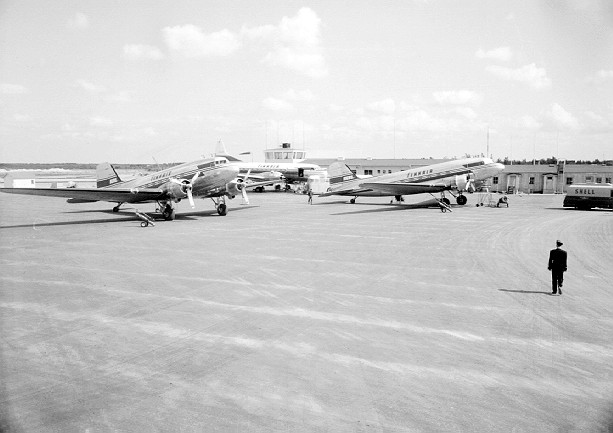
DC-3 aircraft at the airport

The construction of the airport runways in Oulunsalo began in 1949 and was completed in 1953 after the previous airport in Oritkari became too outdated for modern aircraft. In 1953 the airport only consisted of gravel runways and it wasn't until 1958 that the terminal and ATC building were built and the runways were paved. Finnair back then "Aero" operated routes from the airport with DC-3 aircraft and started flights with Sud Aviation Caravelle jets from Oulu in 1964. The current terminal building was built to replace the old one in 1973 and expanded/renovated in 2002 and 2011 with the old one being demolished in the fall of 2005. The second runway of the airport was removed in the early 2000s and the current ATC tower was built in 1998.

== Facilities ==
=== Terminal ===
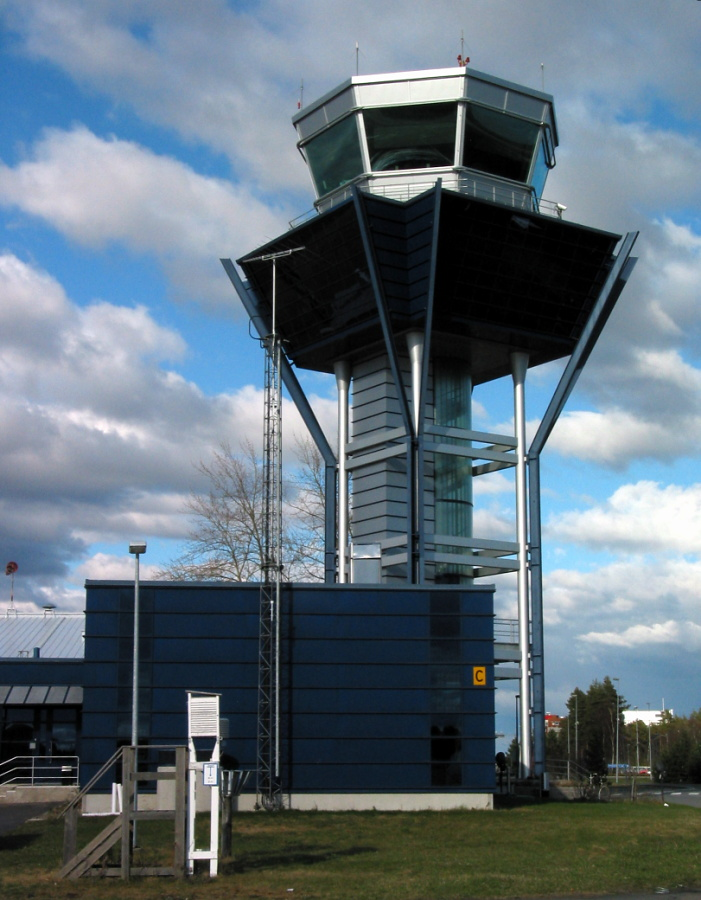
Oulu Airport air traffic control tower

The old terminal of the airport was demolished in 2005 for more apron space and a major extension of the main terminal was completed in September 2011. Four new jetbridge gates (gates 13–16) were constructed and the main terminal was expanded by 4,300 square metres (46,000 sq ft), raising the capacity of the airport to 1.5 million passengers per year. The terminal has three cafes, one before security and two in the gate area which also has a bar "Oluthuone Toppila" and a duty-free shop. There's also a designated smoking area and a grand piano that can be played by visitors.

=== Runway ===
Oulu Airport has one runway, 12/30, which is 2,501 m (8,205 ft) long and 60 m (197 ft) wide. Runway 12 is equipped with Category II Instrument landing system. The runway was renewed in summer 2017.

== Airlines and destinations ==
The following airlines operate regular scheduled and charter flights at Oulu Airport:

Airlines	Destinations
Aegean Airlines	Seasonal charter: Chania, Rhodes
airBaltic	Riga
Finnair	Tampere, Helsinki

== Statistics ==
Annual passenger statistics for Oulu Airport
Year	Domestic passengers	International passengers	Total passengers	Change
2025	495,337	49,697	545,034	-6.0% ▼
2024	502,278	77,584	579,862	4.7% ▲
2023	512,053	42,043	554,096	-12.3% ▼
2022	591,992	40,138	632,130	110.4% ▲
2021	292,375	8,015	300,390	-4.0% ▼
2020	296,088	16,804	312,892	-70.4% ▼
2019	950,699	106,656	1,057,355	-3.6% ▼
2018	991,161	105,756	1,096,917	+18.8% ▲
2017	851,542	71,704	923,246	−10.1% ▼
2016	950,203	77,292	1,027,495	+4.6% ▲
2015	890,609	92,114	982,723	+2.3% ▲
2014	829,936	130,611	960,547	+9.5% ▲
2013	745,178	131,902	877,080	−18.7% ▼
2012	899 854	178,679	1,078,533	+10.7% ▲
2011	850,305	123,607	973,912	+39.1% ▲
2010	595,457	105,119	700,576	+1.7% ▲
2009	605,534	82,424	687,958	−14.3% ▼
2008	709,779	92,176	801,955	−4.5% ▼
2007	764,674	75,276	839,950	−0.9% ▼
2006	764,831	83,115	847,946	+4.6% ▲
2005	724,867	85,587	810,454	+4.9% ▲
2004	691,668	80,663	772,331	+15.3% ▲
2003	585,070	84,812	669,882	+5.0% ▲
2002	573,090	64,612	637,702	−11.1% ▼
2001	656,865	60,379	717,224	−2.1% ▼
2000	668,860	63,988	732,848	6.3% ▲
1999	633,400	56,202	689,602	4.9% ▲
1998	583,609	73,727	657,336	
1991			474,763	
1984			> 300,000	
1980			249,564	
1976			256,164	
1970			120,797	

== Ground transportation ==
Means of transport at Oulu Airport
Means of transport	Operator	Route	Destinations	Website	Notes
Bus	Oulu Public Transport	8, 9	City Centre (Finnish: Keskusta), University	www.osl.fi/en/	Every 15 minutes

== Incidents and accidents ==
- Finnair Flight 405 was hijacked from Oulu on September 30, 1978. The Hijacking was resolved without any injuries or fatalities and the hijacker, 37-year-old Aarno Lamminparras was arrested at his home in Oulu the next day after he had received his ransom demands. A Finnish movie The Hijack That Went South is based on the events of the hijacking by Lamminparras.

== See also ==
- List of the largest airports in the Nordic countries
