= Hellsinki =

- Film poster
- Finnish: Rööperi
- Directed by: Aleksi Mäkelä
- Written by: Marko Leino
- Based on: Rööperi – rikoksen vuodet 1955–2005 by Harri Nykänen; Tom Sjöberg
- Produced by: Jukka Helle; Markus Selin
- Starring: Samuli Edelmann; Peter Franzén; Pihla Viitala; Kari Hietalahti; Juha Veijonen; Jasper Pääkkönen
- Cinematography: Pini Hellstedt
- Edited by: Kimmo Taavila
- Music by: Kalle Chydenius
- Production company: Solar Films
- Distributed by: Nordisk Film
- Release date: 9 January 2009
- Running time: 133 minutes
- Country: Finland
- Language: Finnish
- Budget: €1,700,000
- Box office: €2,191,299

Hellsinki (Finnish: Rööperi) is a 2009 Finnish film directed by Aleksi Mäkelä. The film is based on the novel Rööperi – rikoksen vuodet 1955–2005 by Harri Nykänen and Tom Sjöberg. Hellsinki follows the journey of two criminals, Tomppa and Krisu, in Punavuori (in slang Rööperi), a neighbourhood in Helsinki, from the mid-1960s to the late 1970s.

== Cast ==
- Samuli Edelmann as Tomppa
- Peter Franzén as Krisu
- Pihla Viitala as Monika
- Kari Hietalahti as Gypsy Kari
- Juha Veijonen as Koistinen
- Jasper Pääkkönen as Korppu
- Kristo Salminen as Arska
- Pekka Valkeejärvi as Uki
- Hiski Grönstrand as Pera
- Tommi Rantamäki as Sale
- Santeri Kinnunen as Teukka
- Kalle Holmberg as Lindström
- Leena Uotila as Tomppa's mother
- Pirkko Mannola as Tyyne, Kari's mother
