= Roba (TV series) =

Finnish police drama television series

- Genre: Crime drama, police procedural
- Directed by: Joona Tena; Aleksi Mäkelä
- Starring: Kari Hietalahti; Aku Hirviniemi; Aarni Kivinen; Leena Pöysti; Riku Nieminen; Tiina Lymi
- Country of origin: Finland
- Original language: Finnish
- No. of seasons: 6
- No. of episodes: 62

Original release
- Network: MTV3
- Release: 1 October 2012 – present

Roba is a long-running Finnish police drama television series. Premiering on 1 October 2012, the ongoing series stars Kari Hietalahti, Aku Hirviniemi, Aarni Kivinen, Leena Pöysti, Riku Nieminen, and Tiina Lymi. In 2013, Roba won the 2012 Golden Venla for Best Drama Series and Hietalahti won the Golden Venla for Best Actor.

== Synopsis ==
The series follows the daily life of Helsinki Police Department's uniformed police unit located on the Pieni Roobertinkatu ("Roba") street.

== Cast and characters ==
- Kari Hietalahti as Sergeant Arto Mäkelä
- Aarni Kivinen as Chief Inspector Heikki "Hessu" Rantaniva (seasons 1–2)
- Aku Hirviniemi as Police Officer Jani Sjöberg
- Leena Pöysti as Police Officer Maikki Kurkela
- Riku Nieminen as Police Officer Pekka Myllymies
- Mari Perankoski as Detective Elina Sinisalo
- Ilari Johansson as Detective Markus Uusitalo
- Rauno Ahonen as Service Duty Officer, Sergeant Niilo Kobra
- Tiina Lymi as Chief Inspector Taru Valtonen (seasons 2–3)
- Markus Järvenpää as Juha Sjöberg
- Esa Latva-Äijö as Jukka Puustinen

== Production ==
Many episodes of the series are directed by Joona Tena and Aleksi Mäkelä. It stars Kari Hietalahti, Aku Hirviniemi, Aarni Kivinen, Leena Pöysti, Riku Nieminen, and Tiina Lymi.

== Broadcast ==
The first season aired on MTV3 in autumn 2012, the second in autumn 2015, and the third season appeared in autumn 2016.

The fourth season aired in 2019 and the fifth in 2021.

The sixth season aired in 2024.

== Awards and nominations ==
In 2013, Roba won the 2012 Golden Venla for Best Drama Series and Hietalahti won the 2012 Golden Venla for Best Actor.

The series was also nominated for the 2015 and 2016 Golden Venlas for Best Drama Series.
