= Reijo Mäki =

Finnish writer (born 1958)

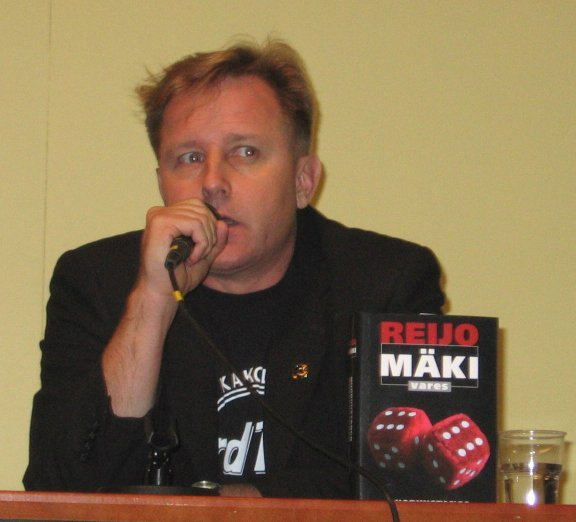
- Reijo Mäki in Helsinki October 2005
- Born: 12 October 1958 (age 67); Siikainen, Finland
- Occupation: Novelist
- Writing career
- Language: Finnish
- Genres: Crime fiction, horror fiction, mystery fiction
- Subjects: Crime, thriller, mystery

Reijo Juhani Mäki (born 12 October 1958) is a Finnish writer of crime fiction.

== Career ==
Mäki published his first novel Enkelipölyä in 1985. His most well-known character is private detective Jussi Vares who was first introduced in the novel Moukanpeli released in 1986. The Vares novels take place in the port city of Turku, and in its jail, Kakola prison. Nine of the Vares novels have been made into feature films. The first two (2004–2007) feature Juha Veijonen as Jussi Vares. The next seven (2011–2015) feature Antti Reini; the first six of these (2011–2012) have been released on DVD in Region 1. Some films have been released in movie theaters in Finland and some straight-to-DVD.

== Works ==
- Enkelipölyä (Angel Dust) (1985)
- Liian kaunis tyttö (Too Beautiful Girl) (1993)
- Rahan kääntöpiiri (Turning Tide of Money) (1994)
- Kruunun vasikka (Snitch of the Crown) (1994)
- Tatuoitu taivas (Tattooed Heaven) (1996)
- Aito turkki (Real Fur) (2001)
- Kaidan tien kulkijat (2001)
- Tukholman keikka (Stockholm Case) (2002)
- Pitkä lounas (Long Lunch) (2002)
- Ehtookellot (Evening Bells) (2007)
- Sahanpururevolveri (2013)

=== Jussi Vares series ===
- Moukanpeli (1986)
- Satakieli lauloi yöllä (A Nightingale Was Singing In The Night) (1987)
- Marraskuu on musta hauta (November Is a Black Grave) (1989)
- Sukkanauhakäärme (Garter Snake) (1989) (Movie: Vares – Sukkanauhakäärme 2011)
- Jäätynyt enkeli (Frozen Angel) (1990) (Movie: V2 – jäätynyt enkeli 2007 [V2 – Frozen Angel])
- Kuoleman kapellimestari (Dirigent of Death) (1991)
- Kaidan tien kulkijat (1992)
- Enkelit kanssasi (Angels With You) (1995)
- Pimeyden tango (Tango of Darkness) (1997)
- Pahan suudelma (Kiss of Evil) (1998) (Movie: Vares – Pahan Suudelma 2011)
- Keltainen leski (Yellow Widow) (1999) (Movie: Vares – yksityisetsivä 2004)
- Mullan maku (Taste of Dirt)(2000)
- Kolmastoista yö (13th Night) (2001)
- Black Jack (2003)
- Jussi Vareksen drinkkiopas (Drinking Guide of Jussi Vares) (2003)
- Huhtikuun tytöt (Girls of April) (2004) (Movie: Vares – Huhtikuun tytöt 2011)
- Nuoruustango (Tango of Youth) (2005)
- Hard Luck Cafe (2006)
- Uhkapelimerkki (Gambling Chip) (2007)
- Lännen mies (Man of the West) (2008)
- Valkovenäläinen (Belarusian) (2009)
- Kolmijalkainen mies (The Three-Legged Man) (2010)
- Mustasiipi (Black Wing) (2011)
- Sheriffi (The Sheriff) (2012)
- Intiaani (The Indian) (2013)
- Cowboy (2014)
- Tulivuori (Volcano) (2015)
- Hot Dog (2016)
- Kakolan kalpea (2017)
- Gekko (2018)
- Tolvana (2019)
- Soopeli (2020)
- Sulhasmies (2021)
- Hotel California (2022)

== General references ==
- Brunsdale, Mitzi M. (12 May 2016). Encyclopedia of Nordic Crime Fiction: Works and Authors of Denmark, Finland, Iceland, Norway and Sweden Since 1967. McFarland. pp. 156–157. ISBN 978-0-7864-7536-0.
