= The Home of Dark Butterflies =

- The Home of Dark Butterflies promotional poster
- Directed by: Dome Karukoski
- Written by: Leena Lander (novel); Marko Leino (screenplay)
- Produced by: Solar Films; MTV3
- Starring: Niilo Syväoja; Tommi Korpela; Kristiina Halttu; Kati Outinen
- Cinematography: Pini Hellstedt
- Edited by: Harri Ylönen
- Music by: Panu Aaltio
- Distributed by: Nordisk Film
- Release date: 11 January 2008
- Running time: 108 minutes
- Country: Finland
- Language: Finnish
- Budget: €1,600,000

The Home of Dark Butterflies (Finnish: Tummien perhosten koti) is a 2008 Finnish film directed by Dome Karukoski and starring Niilo Syväoja, Tommi Korpela, Kristiina Halttu and Kati Outinen. The film is an adaptation of the award-winning novel of the same name by Leena Lander.

The Home of Dark Butterflies was released on 11 January 2008 and was well received in its native Finland, winning the 2009 Jussi Awards for Best Direction (Karukoski), Best Editing (Ylönen), Best Supporting Actor (Sveholm) and the People's Choice Award.

== Cast ==
- Niilo Syväoja as Juhani Johansson
- Tommi Korpela as Olavi Harjula
- Kristiina Halttu as Irene Harjula
- Kati Outinen as Tyyne
- Pertti Sveholm as Erik Johansson
- Matleena Kuusniemi as Maire Johansson
- Eero Milonoff as Salmi
- Marjut Maristo as Vanamo Harjula
- Roope Karisto as Sjöblom
- Ville Saksela as Rinne

== See also ==
- 2008 in film
- Cinema of Finland
- List of Finnish films: 2000s
