= Mogadishu Avenue =

Finnish drama comedy TV series

- Genre: Drama comedy
- Written by: Jari Tervo
- Starring: Juha Veijonen; Petri Manninen; Minna Turunen; Kari Hietalahti; Pirkka-Pekka Petelius; Mateus Tembe
- Country of origin: Finland
- Original language: Finnish
- No. of seasons: 1
- No. of episodes: 8

Production
- Production locations: Suvela, Espoo, Finland
- Running time: 45 minutes
- Production company: Säihky

Original release
- Network: MTV3
- Release: 2006

Mogadishu Avenue is a Finnish drama comedy TV series written by Jari Tervo. The series deals with the everyday life of immigrants in Finland.

The name Mogadishu Avenue comes from a nickname of various streets in eastern Helsinki, particularly the main street in Meri-Rastila, where many Somali immigrants live. The nickname itself comes from Mogadishu, the capital of Somalia.
