= Finnair Flight 405 =

1978 aircraft hijacking

- The aircraft during the hijacking

Hijacking
- Date: 30 September 1978
- Summary: Hijacking

Aircraft
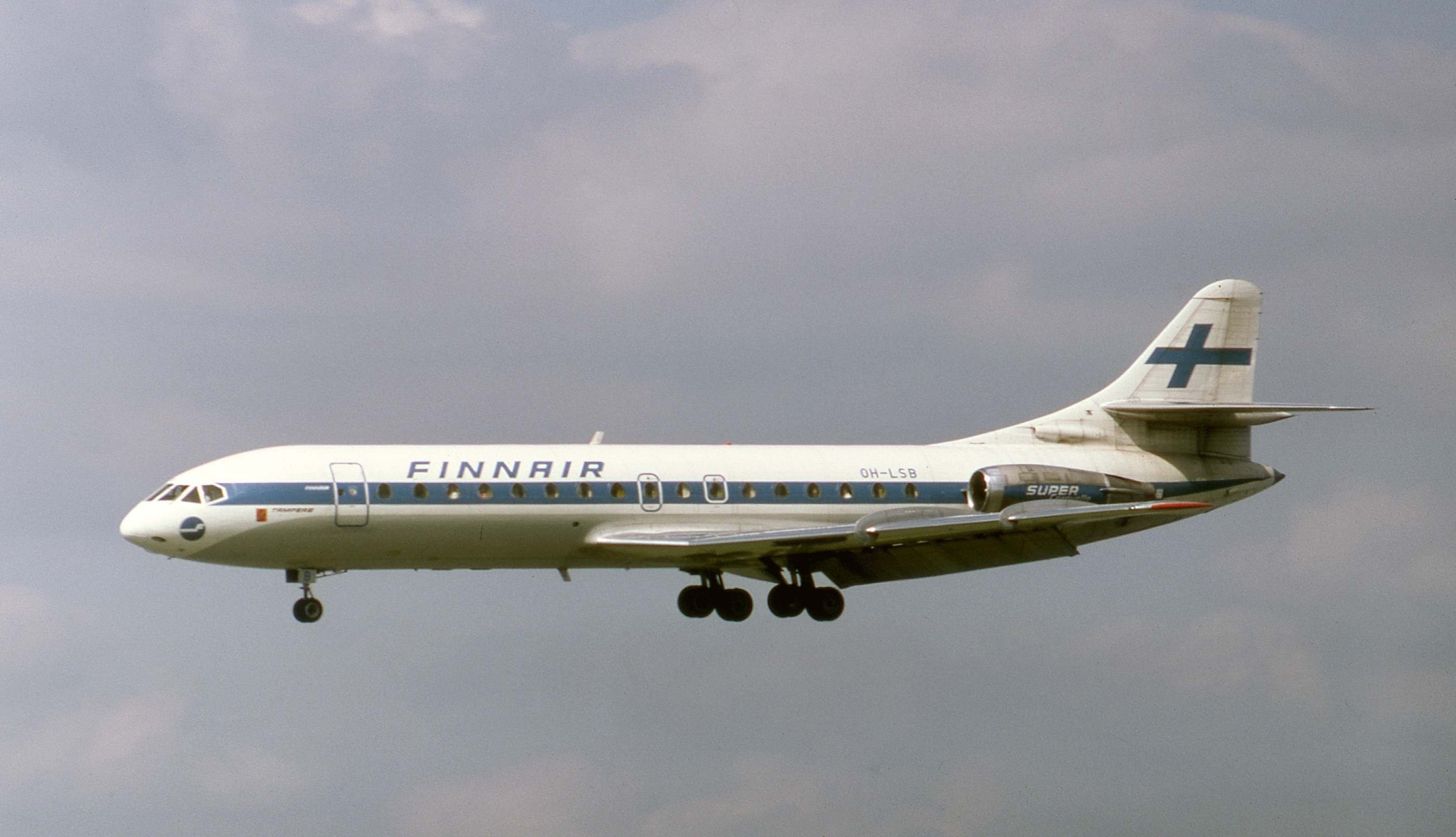
- OH-LSB, the aircraft involved in the hijacking, seen in 1980
- Aircraft type: Sud Aviation SE-210 Caravelle
- Aircraft name: Tampere
- Operator: Finnair
- Registration: OH-LSB
- Flight origin: Oulu Airport, Finland
- Destination: Helsinki-Vantaa Airport, Finland
- Occupants: 49
- Passengers: 44
- Crew: 5
- Fatalities: 0
- Survivors: 49

Finnair Flight 405 was a scheduled domestic passenger flight between Oulu and Helsinki, Finland, that was hijacked on 30 September 1978. The Finnair operated Sud Aviation Caravelle with 44 passengers and 5 crew aboard was hijacked by Aarno Lamminparras, an unemployed home building contractor. The aircraft shuttled between Helsinki, Amsterdam and Oulu, with passengers offloaded in exchange for ransom demands in cash. The aircraft finally returned to Oulu where the hijacker made more ransom demands and released the three crew hostages. He was then allowed home as part of the deal, but was arrested at his home the following day.

The 2013 Finnish drama film The Hijack That Went South, directed by Aleksi Mäkelä, has been made on the basis of the case.

== Hijacking ==
Flight 405 was a regularly scheduled domestic passenger flight operated by Finnair between Oulu Airport and Helsinki Airport. On 30 September 1978, the flight was serviced by a Sud Aviation SE-210 Caravelle.

Aarno Lamminparras, a 37-year-old unemployed home building contractor who had recently declared bankruptcy, boarded the aircraft in Oulu. Since Finnish airports did not perform security checks on domestic flights, he was able to carry a loaded Walther 7.65mm pistol aboard. At approximately 16:00, while en route to Helsinki, Lamminparras entered the cockpit and held the pilot at gunpoint. The aircraft continued to Helsinki, where 34 of the passengers were released.

Lamminparras subsequently forced the pilot to fly back to Oulu where the aircraft circled the airport for several hours before landing to refuel. A US$ 168,000 ransom payment from Finnair was also loaded onto the plane. The plane was then flown back to Helsinki, where Lamminparras demanded $38,000 from Helsingin Sanomat, Finland's largest newspaper. The newspaper paid approximately $18,000, and the remaining eleven passengers were freed.

The aircraft then flew to Amsterdam, where it landed at Schiphol Airport and got refueled. It then returned to Helsinki and received the remainder of the newspaper's ransom payment. The Caravelle then continued on to Oulu.

Lamminparras's final demands included four bottles of whiskey, a chauffeured limousine, and 24 hours alone at home with his wife. After police agreed to his demands, Lamminparras released the final three hostages, all of them crewmembers. He agreed to surrender peacefully Monday morning.

Oulu police stormed Lamminparras's house and arrested him on Sunday, 1 October. A police spokesman indicated that law enforcement officers had tapped the hijacker's home phone, and that he had made several phone calls that implied he did not plan to surrender peacefully as he had initially agreed. He was sentenced to seven years' imprisonment in 1979.

== See also ==
- Aircraft hijacking
- List of aircraft hijackings
- The Hijack That Went South
