= Hanna Karjalainen =

Finnish actress

Hanna Kinnunen
- Born: Hanna Maria Kinnunen; 8 July 1980 (age 46); Oulu, Finland
- Education: University of Jyväskylä
- Occupation: Actress

Hanna Maria Kinnunen (née Karjalainen) (born 8 July 1980 in Oulu) became known in 2003 when she won the Haluatko filmitähdeksi (Do You Want To Be A Film Star?) competition, where the prize was the central role in the film Levottomat 3. Karjalainen acted in the 2004 movie, but the role was more minor than promised. Before that, Karjalainen had acted in a minor role in the 2001 film Rölli ja metsänhenki.

Kinnunen is a University of Jyväskylä graduate. Kinnunen is married to her husband, who was born in Oulu. They married in 2008. She is a mother of two children.

From 2006 to 2009, Kinnunen acted in the MTV3 soap series Salatut elämät, where she played Laura Kiviranta's talkative cousin Salla Laitela (former Tervajoki, née Mattila). Salla returned to the show in 2019 and later became Salla Taalasmaa after she married Kari Taalasmaa.

Kinnunen has recorded R&B music with an alias "HannaB". She won the 8th season of Tähdet, tähdet in 2024.
