= Me and Morrison =

2001 film by Lenka Hellstedt

- Directed by: Lenka Hellstedt
- Written by: Marko Leino
- Based on: Minä ja Morrison by Katariina Souri
- Produced by: Markus Selin
- Starring: Irina Björklund; Samuli Edelmann; Eva Röse; Roope Karisto
- Cinematography: Mark Stubbs
- Edited by: Kimmo Taavila
- Music by: Tuomas Kantelinen
- Production company: Solar Films
- Distributed by: Buena Vista International
- Release date: 28 December 2001
- Running time: 91 minutes
- Country: Finland
- Language: Finnish
- Budget: 8.5 million mk

Me and Morrison (Finnish: Minä ja Morrison) is a 2001 Finnish romantic drama film directed by Lenka Hellstedt. The film is based on the novel Minä ja Morrison by Katariina Souri and is the second film in the Restless trilogy, preceded by Restless (2000) and followed by Addiction (2004).

== Cast ==
- Irina Björklund as Milla
- Samuli Edelmann as Aki
- Roope Karisto as Joonas
- Eva Röse as Sophie
- Titta Jokinen as Milla's mother
- Yorick van Wageningen as Jan
- Baltasar Kormákur as Askildsen
- Irina Pulkka as a travel agency clerk
- Maija-Liisa Márton as Kerttu, Aki's mother

== Reception ==
Gunnar Rehlin of Variety praised Irina Bjorklund for her "knockout performance", saying that "[this] is enough [of a reason] to see this Finnish drama about two loners who find each other but realize it's difficult to stop the spiral from continuing downward".

== Awards ==
Jussi Awards

| Year | Nominee / work | Award | Result |
|---|---|---|---|
| 2002 | Me and Morrison | Best Actress (Paras naispääosa) | Won |
| 2002 | Me and Morrison | Best Editing (Paras leikkaus); Best Film (Paras elokuva) | Nominated |
