= Addiction (film) =

- Theatrical release poster
- Directed by: Minna Virtanen
- Screenplay by: Lara Moon
- Based on: a short story by Leena Lehtolainen
- Produced by: Markus Selin
- Cinematography: Mark Stubbs
- Edited by: Jussi Lehto
- Music by: Leri Leskinen; DJ Slow
- Production company: Solar Films
- Distributed by: Buena Vista International
- Release date: 16 January 2004 (Finland)
- Country: Finland
- Language: Finnish
- Budget: €1 million
- Box office: €1,028,343

Addiction (Finnish: Levottomat 3) is a 2004 Finnish romantic drama film directed by Minna Virtanen. It is the last film in the Restless trilogy, preceded by Restless (2000) and Me and Morrison (2001).

Addiction received a lot of criticism. It has been described as two-dimensional and "peeping entertainment".

== Cast ==
- Mi Grönlund as Jonna
- Nicke Lignell as Niklas
- Jasper Pääkkönen as Aleksi
- Amira Khalifa as Nora
- Hanna Karjalainen as Helena
- Saija Lentonen as Sanna
- Jukka Puotila as Herman
- Miska Kaukonen as Mika
