= Ihmisten puolue =

Finnish political satire television series

Ihmisten puolue was a Finnish political satire television series that was broadcast on Yle TV1 from 30 August 2008 to 29 May 2010. The series was produced by Filmiteollisuus. It was directed by Atte Järvinen and written by Järvinen and Reino Portimo.

== Premise ==
Ihmisten puolue features a fictional Finnish party called Ihmisten puolue (literally "The Humans' Party"). The party is very small and does not have any seats in the Parliament of Finland or in municipal councils. Five members of the party gather weekly to discuss current topics and to decide the party's stance on them. The party members usually argue about everything because their opinions differ wildly from one another.

== Cast ==
Members of the party were portrayed by the following actors:

- Taneli Mäkelä as Tapani "Tapsa" Riihimäki, a diplomi-insinööri and the weak-willed leader of the party. Whenever a discussion gets out of hand, he tries—usually in vain—to rein it back in. He sometimes takes it upon himself to make decisions despite the others' objections.
- Mari Perankoski as Päivi Teittinen, a spirited, impulsive karaoke DJ. Her suggestions are usually outlandish and impractical, but she still manages to get the others on her side, much to Tapsa's dismay. She and Topi-Petteri are heavily implied to have feelings for one another, but neither of them is willing to admit it.
- Asko Sahlman as Hannes Säkkijärvi, a left-wing offset printer. He's often at odds with Topi-Petteri, who's on the other end of the political spectrum.
- Kari Hietalahti as Topi-Petteri Saikkonen, a right-wing entrepreneur. Since he and Hannes have clashing political views, the two often lock horns. Topi-Petteri is often the first to side with Päivi in discussions; it is also implied from time to time that the two have feelings for each other.
- Kaija Pakarinen as Regina Mälkki, a kind-hearted masseuse who is easily influenced by the other party members. She has a seven-year-old son, Jusu-Petteri, whom she loves to brag about.

== Awards ==
Ihmisten puolue won a Venla Award for the best entertainment program in 2009 and a Kultainen Venla Award for the best entertainment and music program in 2010.
