= Bad Boys (2003 film) =

2003 Finnish crime drama film

- Film poster
- Directed by: Aleksi Mäkelä
- Written by: Pekka Lehtosaari
- Produced by: Markus Selin
- Starring: Peter Franzén, Niko Saarela, Lauri Nurkse, Jasper Pääkkönen, Vesa-Matti Loiri
- Music by: Tuomas Kantelinen
- Production company: Solar Films
- Distributed by: Buena Vista International
- Release date: 17 January 2003
- Running time: 126 minutes
- Country: Finland
- Language: Finnish
- Budget: €1,826,000
- Box office: $4,778,324 (Finland)

Bad Boys (Finnish: Pahat pojat) is a 2003 Finnish crime drama film directed by Aleksi Mäkelä, based on the story of a notorious real-life family of criminals known as "The Daltons of Eura". It was the second most successful film in Finnish theatres after The Lord of the Rings: The Return of the King in 2003, taking in $4,778,324. This makes the film one of the most successful Finnish films at the national box office of all time.

== Cast ==
- Peter Franzén as Otto Takkunen
- Niko Saarela as Matti Takkunen
- Lauri Nurkse as Ilkka Takkunen
- Jasper Pääkkönen as Eero Takkunen
- Vesa-Matti Loiri as Jouko Takkunen
- Elsa Saisio as Pirjo Suutari
- Risto Tuorila as Ensio Suutari
- Hannu-Pekka Björkman as Muukkonen
- Janna Herttuainen as Leena
- Eero Milonoff as Aulis
- Oiva Lohtander as Headteacher
- Arttu Kapulainen as Timo
- Eeva Litmanen as Tuulikki Suutari
- Outi Mäenpää as Sirkka Takkunen

Pahat pojat album's gold record celebration in 2003
