= Minna Turunen =

Finnish actress

Minna Turunen (born 22 April 1969 in Lahti) is a Finnish actress. Turunen graduated from the Helsinki Theatre Academy in 1994.

Turunen's son is the actor and TV host Roope Salminen.

Turunen disappeared from public view in the late 2000s. In 2017, she announced that she had suffered a brain injury. In 2018, she announced that she was suffering from Alzheimer's disease.

== Filmography ==
=== Television ===
- Salatut elämät (2007) – Taru Saaristo
- Mogadishu Avenue (2006) – Irina Totkunen
- Haluatko filmitähdeksi? (2003) – hostess
- Klubi (1998) – Janita Westin
- Tuliportaat (1998) – Carola Jarvis
- Takaisin kotiin (1995)
- Rapman (1995)
- Kuudesti laukeava (in three episodes, 1992) – Titta Hytönen-Amin
- Ruusun aika (in five episodes, 1990–1991) – Nurse Jonna Joki

=== Films ===
- Vares - Yksityisetsivä (2004) – Ifigenia Multanen
- Umur (2002) – Umur
- Ken tulta pyytää (2001) – Alarm centrum
- Lapin kullan kimallus (1999) – Ralla-Kaisa
- Esa ja Vesa - auringonlaskun ratsastajat (1994) – 2. receptionist
- Romanovin kivet (1993) – Interpreter
- Kotia päin (1989) – Annette
