= Mikko Kouki =

Finnish actor, theatre director and screenwriter (born 1967)

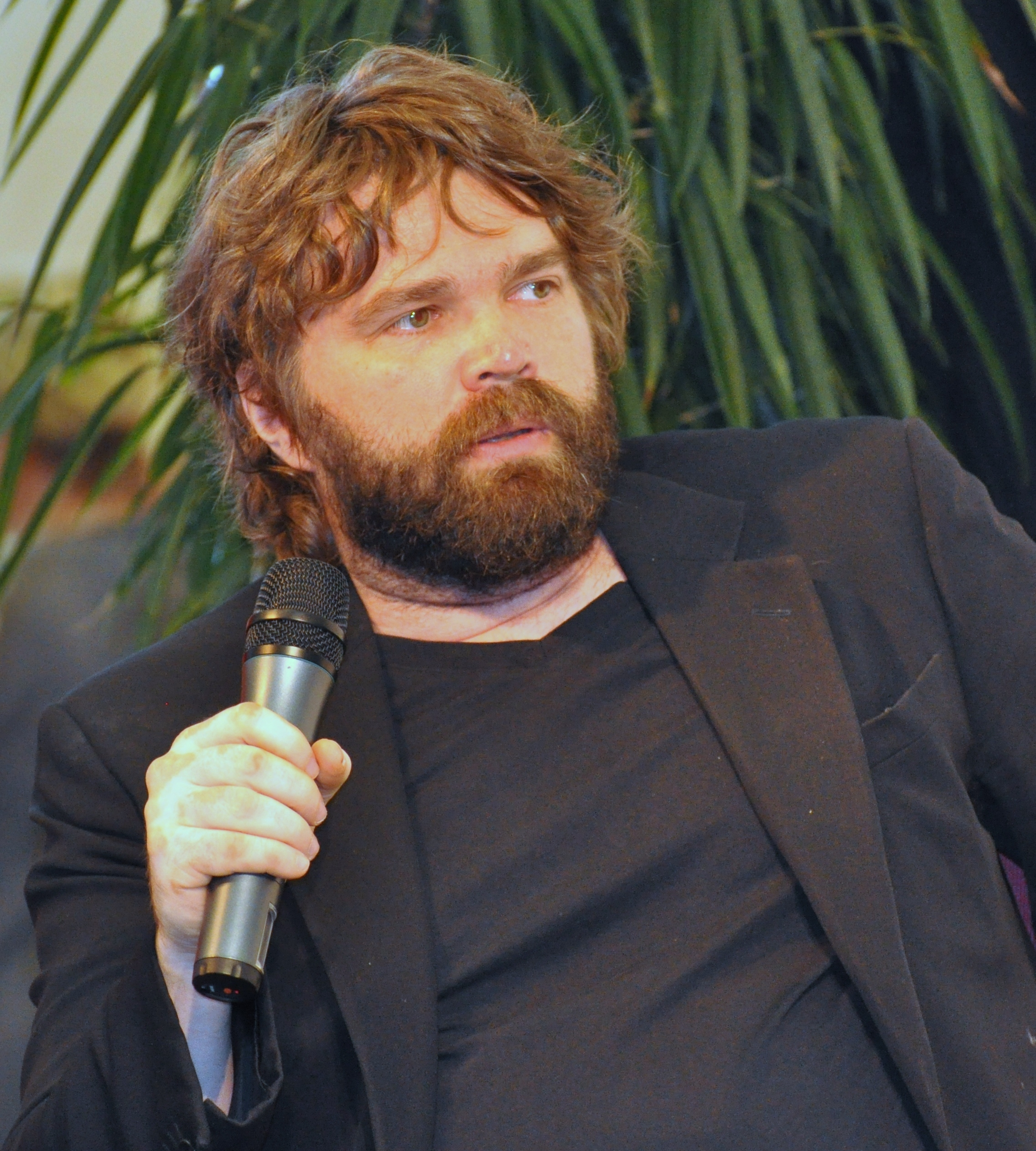
- Born: 14 September 1967 (age 58); Lohja, Finland
- Occupation: Actor
- Years active: 1986–present

Mikko Kouki (born 14 September 1967) is a Finnish actor, theatre director and screenwriter. He has appeared in more than thirty films since 1986.

== Early life and education ==
Kouki comes from a family of actors, including his father, Tapio Kouki, his aunt Marja-Leena Kouki and his uncle Juhani Kouki. The actor and singer Samuli Edelmann is his cousin. He attended Kallio High School in Helsinki. He graduated from University of the Arts Helsinki in Theatre Arts in 1991, but did not find the course a good preparation for work.

== Career ==
Kouki was the first director of Linnateatteri in Turku, from 2003 to 2012. He went on to direct the Oulu City Theatre between 2012 and 2014. He led the restoration of Turku City Theatre, and is its director.

He has won two Jussi Awards: best screenplay for Frozen City and best supporting actor for Man Exposed, both films released in 2006 and given Jussi Awards in 2007.

== Personal life ==
Kouki is married to the writer Niina Repo. They live in Turku and have two children.

== Selected filmography ==
Film
Year	Title	Role	Notes
2013	8-pallo		
2012	Naked Harbour		
2008	Blackout		
2007	Joulutarina		
2005	Beauty and the Bastard		
2005	Frozen Land		
2002	Lovers & Leavers		

TV
Year	Title	Role	Notes
1993	Underworld Trilogy		
