= Kari-Pekka Toivonen =

Finnish actor (born 1967)

- Born: 6 May 1967 (age 59); Turku, Finland
- Occupation: Actor

Kari-Pekka Toivonen (born 6 May 1967) is a Finnish actor. He received a 2004 Best Actor Jussi Award for the film Upswing. Taivonen, who received his Master's Degree at the Helsinki Theatre Academy, was the recipient of a 2005 Shooting Stars Award.

== Filmography ==
- The Path of the Righteous Men (2012)
- The Storage (2011)
- Kolmistaan (2008, in coming) – Tomi Laakso
- Sooloilua (2007, in coming)
- V2 – jäätynyt enkeli (2007) – Taisto Pusenius
- Rock'n Roll Never Dies (2006) – Pumppu
- Suden arvoitus (2006)
- Äideistä parhain (2005) – Lauri, Eero's father
- Kukkia ja sidontaa (2004) – Ali Makkonen
- Lapsia ja aikuisia – kuinka niitä tehdään? (2004) – Antero
- Nousukausi (2003) – Kari
- Lakeuden kutsu (2000) – Nikander's helper
- Rukajärven tie (1999) – Leinonen
- Vääpeli Körmy ja kahtesti laukeava (1997) – corporal Törönen
- Sagojogan ministeri (1997) – Otto Swinskjöld
- Peppi Pitkätossu (1997)
- Tie naisen sydämeen (1996) – Kihara
- Romanovin kivet (1993) – Valto
- Ristilukki (1993) – Kuusinen
- Häräntappoase (1989) – Late
