= Santeri Kinnunen =

Finnish actor (born 1969)

- Born: Santeri Karl-Henrik Kinnunen; 20 August 1969 (age 57); Helsinki, Finland
- Occupation: Actor

Santeri Karl-Henrik Kinnunen (born 20 August 1969) is a Finnish actor. Kinnunen, who spent most of his career at the Helsinki City Theatre, has acted in numerous film and television productions and worked as a voice actor.

Kinnunen started the Helsinki Theatre Academy in 1987, from which he graduated in 1991. He has acted in the KOM Theater in 1990 and 1991, in the Finnish National Theatre in 1991 and 1992, and in the Helsinki City Theater since 1992. He is the son of actors Heikki Kinnunen and Rose-Marie Precht.

He played the lead role in a 2024 production of Jez Butterworth's Jerusalem at the Helsinki City Theatre.

== Selected filmography ==
=== Films ===
- A Charming Mass Suicide (2000) as Seppo Sorjonen
- Ponterosa (2001) as a family man at the campsite
- Kohtalon kirja (2003) as Lieutenant Grönvall
- Vares: Private Eye (2004) as Touko Reiman
- Matti: Hell Is for Heroes (2006) as reporter at the airport
- Hellsinki (2009) as Teukka
- M/S Romantic (2019, TV)

=== TV-series ===
- How to Kill a Bull (1989) as Alpo "Allu" Antero Korva
- Vintiöt (1994) as several sketch characters
- Moominvalley (2019) as Stinky (in Finnish dub)
- 66th North Precinct (2023) as Jykä Varjola
