= Mikko Nousiainen =

Finnish actor

Mikko Olavi Nousiainen (born 26 April 1975, in Tampere) is a Finnish actor. His father is actor Heikki Nousiainen.

== Selected filmography ==
- Friends, Comrades (1990)
- Going to Kansas City (1998)
- Restless (2000)
- Stripping (2002)
- Kohtalon kirja (2002)
- Sibelius (2003)
- Trench Road (2004)
- Married to a Lie (2008)
- 5 Days of War (2011)
- The Kiss of Evil (2011)
- Rakkauden rasvaprosentti (2012)
- Vuonna 85 (2013)
- The Liberation of Skopje (2016)
