= Vares: Private Eye =

2004 Finnish crime film

- Original Finnish film poster
- Directed by: Aleksi Mäkelä
- Screenplay by: Pekka Lehtosaari
- Based on: Keltainen leski by Reijo Mäki
- Produced by: Markus Selin
- Starring: Juha Veijonen; Laura Malmivaara; Samuli Edelmann; Pekka Valkeejärvi; Kari Hietalahti; Jorma Tommila
- Cinematography: Pini Hellstedt
- Edited by: Kimmo Taavila
- Music by: Kalle Chydenius
- Production company: Solar Films
- Distributed by: Buena Vista International
- Release date: 23 July 2004 (Finland)
- Running time: 95 minutes
- Country: Finland
- Language: Finnish
- Budget: €1.5 million
- Box office: €1,549,176

Vares: Private Eye (Finnish: Vares – yksityisetsivä) is a 2004 Finnish crime film directed by Aleksi Mäkelä. It is based on the eleventh Vares novel Keltainen leski (1999) by Reijo Mäki. The setting is Turku, a city on the west coast of Finland. It stars Juha Veijonen as private detective Jussi Vares who investigates a case involving a large amount of dirty money. The film is the first of nine films in the Vares series. The first sequel, V2: Dead Angel, was released in 2007.

== Cast ==
- Juha Veijonen as Jussi Vares
- Laura Malmivaara as Eeva Sunila
- Samuli Edelmann as Mikko Koitere
- Pekka Valkeejärvi as Jari "Hillosilmä" Munck
- Kari Hietalahti as Tetsuo Sinkkonen
- Jorma Tommila as Antero Kraft
- Minna Turunen as Ifigenia Multanen
- Jari Halonen as Karl E. Miesmann
- Markku Peltola as Luusalmi
- Jasper Pääkkönen as Jarmo
- Santeri Kinnunen as Touko Reiman
- Heli Sutela as Liisa, Eeva's friend
- Georges Copeloussis as Gennadi Antipov
- Topias Tanska as Jaakko
