= Man Exposed =

2006 Finnish comedy-drama film

- Original Finnish film poster
- Finnish: Riisuttu mies
- Directed by: Aku Louhimies
- Written by: Veli-Pekka Hänninen
- Starring: Samuli Edelmann; Mikko Kouki; Matleena Kuusniemi
- Release date: 2006
- Country: Finland
- Language: Finnish

Man Exposed (Finnish: Riisuttu mies) is a 2006 Finnish comedy-drama film directed by Aku Louhimies. The film revolves around a rebel religious minister who is suddenly asked to run for bishop. At the same time, his marriage is in trouble. The film stars Samuli Edelmann, Mikko Kouki, and Matleena Kuusniemi.

== Cast ==
- Samuli Edelmann as Antti Pitkänen
- Matleena Kuusniemi as Tuula
- Mikko Kouki as Markku

== Production ==
The film was the object of legal disagreements between the screenwriter Veli-Pekka Hänninen and the production company, the first deeming his script had not been respected.

== Accolades ==
- Jussi Awards 2007: Best Supporting Actor – Mikko Kouki
- Tallinn Black Nights Film Festival 2006: Jury Prize for Best Actor – Samuli Edelmann

== Reception ==
The film received mixed reviews.
