= Petteri Summanen =

Finnish actor and screenwriter (born 1969)

- Born: Jukka Petteri Summanen; 20 March 1969 (age 56); Säkylä, Finland
- Occupations: Actor; screenwriter

Jukka Petteri Summanen (born 20 March 1969 in Säkylä, Satakunta, Finland) is a Finnish actor and screenwriter. Summanen has worked mainly as an actor on Finnish television since 1995, while also having appeared in films such as Levottomat, Paha maa and Blackout.

== Selected filmography ==
- Levottomat (2000)
- Haaveiden kehä (2002)
- Nousukausi (2003)
- Keisarikunta (2004)
- Paha maa (2005)
- FC Venus (2005)
- Blackout (2008)
- Risto (2011)
- The Path of the Righteous Men (2012)
