= The Hijack That Went South =

2013 Finnish drama film

- Directed by: Aleksi Mäkelä
- Starring: Kari Hietalahti; Aake Kalliala
- Release date: 18 January 2013
- Running time: 1h 33min
- Country: Finland
- Language: Finnish

The Hijack That Went South (Finnish: Kaappari) is a 2013 Finnish drama film directed by Aleksi Mäkelä. The film is based on real events of the 1978 Oulu Hijacking.

== Cast ==
- Kari Hietalahti – Aarno Lamminparras
- Aake Kalliala – Captain Rajapaltio
- Jussi Vatanen – Co-pilot Snock
- Elina Keinonen – Ylppö
- Maija Junno – Omenainen
- Merja Larivaara – Kananen
- Hannu-Pekka Björkman – Juristi Marttinen
