= Suburban Virgin =

- Espoon viimeinen neitsyt
- Written by: Selma Vilhunen
- Directed by: Hanna Maylett
- Starring: Hennariikka Laaksola; Saila Laakkonen
- Music by: Olli Kykkänen
- Country of origin: Finland
- Original language: Finnish

Production
- Producer: Nina Koljonen
- Cinematography: Jyri Hakala
- Editor: Kimmo Kohtamäki
- Running time: 63 minutes
- Production company: Fantasiafilmi

Original release
- Release: 10 November 2003

Suburban Virgin (Finnish: Espoon viimeinen neitsyt) is a 2003 Finnish television drama film directed by Hanna Maylett. The film was made for Yle TV1 using amateur actors. Suburban Virgin follows a hitchhiking journey of two 16-year-old girls.

The literal translation of the original title Espoon viimeinen neitsyt would be "the last virgin of Espoo".

== Cast ==
- Hennariikka Laaksola as Minna
- Saila Laakkonen as Emma
- Lauri Kontula
- Maria Krestjanoff
- Linda Lindfors
- Jukka Reinikainen
