= V2: Dead Angel =

2007 Finnish crime film

- Theatrical release poster
- Directed by: Aleksi Mäkelä
- Screenplay by: Marko Leino
- Based on: Jäätynyt enkeli by Reijo Mäki
- Produced by: Markus Selin
- Starring: Juha Veijonen; Hannu-Pekka Björkman; Jussi Lampi; Johanna Kokko; Lotta Lindroos
- Cinematography: Pini Hellstedt
- Edited by: Dan Peled
- Music by: Lauri Porra
- Production company: Solar Films
- Distributed by: Buena Vista International
- Release date: 12 January 2007 (Finland)
- Running time: 92 minutes
- Country: Finland
- Language: Finnish
- Budget: €1.5 million
- Box office: €1,541,266

V2: Dead Angel (Finnish: V2 – Jäätynyt enkeli) is a 2007 Finnish crime film directed by Aleksi Mäkelä. It is a sequel to the 2004 film Vares: Private Eye and is based on the 1990 novel Jäätynyt enkeli by Reijo Mäki. It was followed by The Kiss of Evil in 2011.

== Plot ==
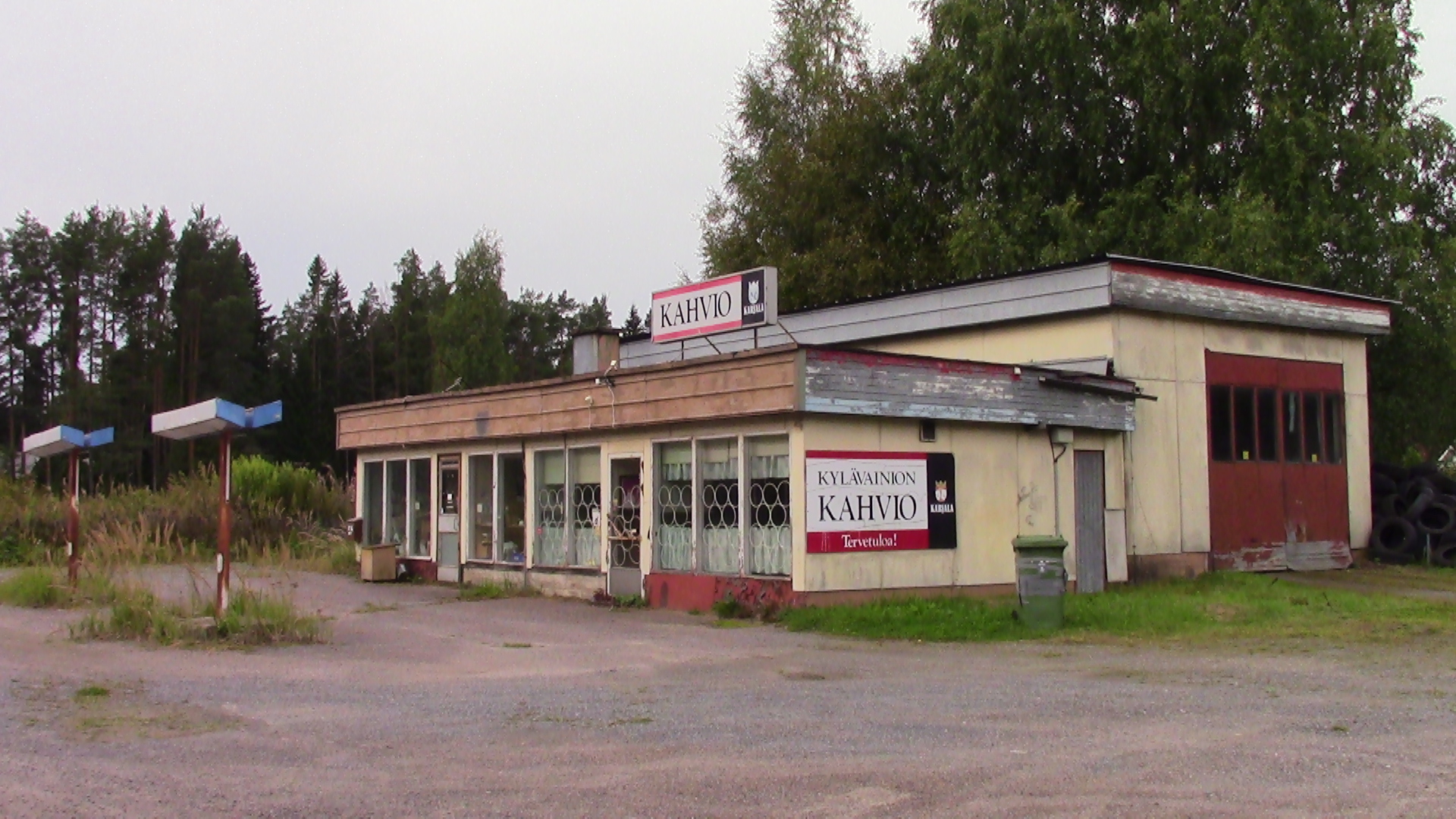
Old petrol station at Niittymaa in Pori, one of the movie's filming locations.

Private detective Jussi Vares investigates the homicide of a young woman that occurred in the city of Pori. It is the second film in the Vares series and the last film to feature Juha Veijonen as Vares.

== Cast ==
- Juha Veijonen as Jussi Vares
- Hannu-Pekka Björkman as Jakke Tienvieri
- Jussi Lampi as Veikko Hopea
- Johanna Kokko as Mirjami Sinervo
- Lotta Lindroos as Lila Haapala
- Kari-Pekka Toivonen as Taisto Pusenius
- Pekka Huotari as Harry Jalkanen
- Kari Väänänen as Usko Saastamoinen
- Seppo Pääkkönen as Nils Hellman
- Matti Onnismaa as Matti Urjala
- Vesa Vierikko as Aarno Kaitainen
- Tommi Korpela as Tom Marjola
- Jasper Pääkkönen as Dante Hell
- Kari Hietalahti as Kullervo Visuri
