= Blatnoi Mir =

- Directed by: Jouni Hiltunen
- Written by: Jouni Hiltunen
- Produced by: Pertti Veijalainen
- Cinematography: Tahvo Hirvonen
- Edited by: Anne Lakanen
- Production company: Illume Oy
- Release date: September 2001
- Running time: 82 minutes
- Country: Finland
- Language: Russian

Blatnoi Mir (The World of Thieves) is a 2001 Finnish documentary film about life-sentenced prisoners in a Russian prison. The film was written and directed by Jouni Hiltunen.

== Synopsis ==
Three life-sentenced prisoners are serving their terms in prison. Andrei Shudarikov has found the Hare Krishna movement. Mikhail Bukharov is deeply depressed and spends his time singing old prison camp songs. Valeri Balin is a former criminal leader and strength athlete who trains daily. He writes nuanced letters to his mother about life and thoughts behind the walls. In addition to their criminal backgrounds, the men are united by their tattooed bodies.

== Cast ==
- Valeri Balin
- Andrei Shudarikov
- Mikhail Bukharov

== Production ==
- Screenplay – Jouni Hiltunen
- Director – Jouni Hiltunen
- Cinematography – Tahvo Hirvonen
- Sound recording – Timo Linnasalo, Jouni Hiltunen
- Sound design – Niko Paakkunainen
- Editing – Anne Lakanen
- Color grading – Timo Nousiainen, Marko Terävä
- Producer – Pertti Veijalainen
- Production manager (Russia) – Aleksander Gutmann
- Production company – Illume Oy

== Awards ==
- Special Mention, Nordisk Panorama, Aarhus, 2001
- Finnish State Film Quality Support, 2002
- Special Prize, Tampere Film Festival, 2002
- Most Courageous Film Award, Infinity Festival Alba, Italy, 2002
- Best Minority Film, Mediawave Festival, Hungary, 2002
