= Kohtalon kirja =

- Original Finnish film poster
- Directed by: Tommi Lepola; Tero Molin
- Written by: Tommi Lepola; Tero Molin
- Produced by: Ilkka Niemi
- Starring: Juha-Pekka Mikkola; Johanna Kokko; Mikko Nousiainen; Vesa Vierikko; Santeri Kinnunen
- Cinematography: Henri Blomberg; Arno Launos; Taneli Seppälä
- Edited by: Marko Jatkola; Marjo Kreku
- Music by: multiple artists
- Release date: 19 November 2003
- Running time: 85 minutes
- Country: Finland
- Language: Finnish

Kohtalon kirja (The Book of Fate, though the website also uses The Booke of Fate) is a Finnish film released in 2003. The movie was a DVD release, though it premiered in a theater.

The film is a multi-genre episode movie. It's frequently described as a "Horror/Western/War/Action/Sci-fi" movie, as it covers all of those genres in different episodes. The frequent themes are horror and fantasy, too.

The movie was conceived and directed by Tommi Lepola and Tero Molin. Many of the makers, including Lepola and the producer Ilkka Niemi, jointly made the movie as their graduation work from Tampereen ammattikorkeakoulu. The lead roles were given to freshly graduated acting students. As a graduation work, it is vastly larger than most such projects.

In addition to these, many well-known Finnish actors, such as Vesa Vierikko, Santeri Kinnunen and Åke Lindman came to make an appearance in the movie. Many of them found it interesting to work on a movie like this, because such movies are not typically made in Finland.

== Plot ==
The movie is divided into five distinct episodes, each representing a different genre and having their own subplot.

Opening narration explains how the Book of Fate came to be. It is a book that is somehow able to change reality. Another civilization beyond the stars got it, and made a pen to control the future - by writing to the book, things could change. This led to a war, but the book vanished. It later reappeared on Earth in order to give another chance to a chosen soul.

The movie starts with a horror episode in Transylvania, where brothers, one of whom is a priest, are looking for a cross that can cure their sister who has been bitten by a vampire. As they find the cross, the priest also finds an ancient, strange book. Then they are suddenly assaulted by vampires. Just as everything seems to be lost and the vampire is about to defeat him, the book gives the priest another chance, and the scene changes.

The next scene starts with a gunfight duel in a typical Western setting. A lonesome bounty hunter - who quite resembles in appearance the priest - defeats a crook and finds the book again. He goes to a town to collect the money, and ends up in a gunfight where he's unable to save an innocent bystander who gets caught in crossfire. Three more crooks arrive to the town to pressure the sheriff to release their friend from the prison. The bounty hunter ends up in a massive gunfight, and it appears that he's getting killed, but once again, the book intervenes.

The next appearance of the book - and a soldier who again resembles the priest - is in the Winter War - Battle of Kollaa, Christmas Day 1939, to be specific. The soldier tries to sneak past a Soviet post, but gets pinned down in an enemy fire. The book intervenes just as a hand grenade is thrown at him.

The next scene opens in modern-day Tampere, in a typical action movie setting. A mad professor has developed a virus that kills everyone once released. The special agents, led by another familiar figure, steal it and its vaccine, but end up roughed up and detained in a distant manor where one of the mad professor's underlings is studying the Book of Fate. After a heroic escape attempt, and accidentally shooting his friend who was on the line of fire with an enemy, he gets stuck in Särkänniemi where the mad professor is about to release the virus.

The next scene, set on a space freighter, starts in virtual reality; a cyborg, again resembling the priest of the past, is playing a video game. This time, however, the priest's spirit is able to appear in the VR projection, and tries to warn the cyborg that the book can be used to prevent the deaths of innocent people - as has happened before. The cyborg's job is to take the book to a group of aliens and he spends good time studying it as he prepares for the journey. As he goes in cryosleep, an alien lady appears in the ship, and the priest's spirit awakens the cyborg, and he is able to stop the alien lady from defacing the book. A representative of the aliens whom the book is being delivered to calls, and tells how dangerous this lady is, and the cyborg is to kill her by depressurizing the ship - sacrificing himself in the process to save millions of lives. The priest's spirit notes too late that, as the cyborg is about to die, he has made the wrong choice again. The alien representative who contacted them earlier were the true antagonists, and the book, and the pen, are about to fall in his hands. The cyborg is, however, able to write a change of reality to the book at the very last moment.

The story then unravels itself: The cyborg reunites with his long-dead wife who lives again, the special agent stops the mad professor, the soldier saves the day, the gunfight is won, and the priest is able to destroy the vampire and save his sister.

== Awards ==
The movie won the Best International Feature Film award in the New York International Independent Film and Video Festival in September 2003.
