= Matti: Hell Is for Heroes =

2006 Finnish biographical film

- Theatrical release poster
- Directed by: Aleksi Mäkelä
- Written by: Marko Leino
- Produced by: Markus Selin
- Starring: Jasper Pääkkönen; Peter Franzén; Elina Hietala; Jope Ruonansuu; Juha Veijonen; Elina Knihtilä
- Cinematography: Pini Hellstedt
- Edited by: Kimmo Taavila
- Music by: Tuomas Kantelinen
- Production company: Solar Films
- Distributed by: Buena Vista International
- Release date: 13 January 2006 (Finland)
- Running time: 135 minutes
- Country: Finland
- Language: Finnish
- Budget: €1.6 million
- Box office: €3,620,391

Matti: Hell Is for Heroes (Finnish: Matti) is a 2006 Finnish biographical film about Finnish skijumper Matti Nykänen. The film was directed by Aleksi Mäkelä and written by Marko Leino. With 461,665 views it was the most watched film in Finland in 2006.

== Cast ==
- Jasper Pääkkönen as Matti Nykänen, a four-time Olympic gold medalist
- Peter Franzén as Nick Nevada, a character based on Mike Sierra, Nykänen's manager
- Elina Hietala as Taina
- Juha Veijonen as Maisteri, based on Matti Pulli, a ski jumping coach
- Elina Knihtilä as Mirva, based on Mervi Tapola
- Jope Ruonansuu as Oksanen
- Kari Hietalahti as Hammer
- Jani Volanen as Nipa
- Jussi Lampi as Jorma Tapio
- Seppo Pääkkönen as Ensio Nykänen, Matti's father

== Soundtrack ==
The soundtrack album for the film, Musiikkia elokuvasta Matti, was released on 11 January 2006. It contains songs performed by Nykänen himself. Two tracks used in the film, "Pidä varas" and "Kingi" performed by Nykänen, were not included in the soundtrack album.

No.	Title	Performer	Length
1.	"Lennä Nykäsen Matti"	Timo Kotipelto	4:22
2.	"V-tyyli"	Matti Nykänen	3:35
3.	"Sukset"	Popeda	3:22
4.	"Backseat"	Peer Günt	4:17
5.	"I Surrender"	Rainbow	4:01
6.	"Poliisi pamputtaa"	Eppu Normaali	1:52
7.	"Yllätysten yö"	Matti Nykänen	2:50
8.	"Bodya, sporttia, tsemppistä"	Sleepy Sleepers	2:36
9.	"Long gone boy"	Havana Black	4:58
10.	"Escape"	Stone	5:21
11.	"Kuuma kesä"	Popeda	2:59
12.	"Samaa nauhaa"	Matti Nykänen	2:40
13.	"On hetki"	Kari Hietalahti	1:44
14.	"The Final Countdown"	Europe	5:09
