= The Tough Ones (1999 film) =

- Theatrical release poster
- Directed by: Aleksi Mäkelä
- Written by: Aleksi Bardy
- Produced by: Markus Selin
- Starring: Samuli Edelmann; Juha Veijonen; Teemu Lehtilä
- Production company: Solar Films
- Distributed by: Buena Vista International
- Release date: 15 January 1999
- Running time: 105 minutes
- Country: Finland
- Language: Finnish
- Box office: $2.7 million

The Tough Ones (Finnish: Häjyt) is a 1999 Finnish crime drama film directed by Aleksi Mäkelä. It was Finland's official Best Foreign Language Film submission at the 72nd Academy Awards, but did not manage to receive a nomination.

Markus Selin, who produced the film, said in the fall of 2023 that a second part is being planned for it, which would also be directed by Aleksi Mäkelä, who directed the first part. In January 2024, more information was given about the film. Häjyt 2, the new generation is its unofficial working title and its filming will start in August–September 2024 and the film should be in theaters in February 2025.

== Plot ==
The film starts with Jussi Murikka (Samuli Edelmann), Antti Karhu (Juha Veijonen) and Heikki Grönberg (Teemu Lehtilä) robbing a bank together. Antti and Jussi are caught, arrested and sent to prison, and five years later they return home to Kauhava. Heikki also returns to the town as police officer. Antti and Jussi continue their lives like before their prison sentence, causing havoc amongst the townsfolk. Heikki tries to help them, but gets in between his old friends and the townsfolk, as they try to get rid of the duo. Antti tries to turn his life around but he fails. The duo begins to sell home made alcohol together with Antti's grandfather, who has been selling it to the townsfolk for years. When Heikki is forced to take action, Antti, Jussi and Roope — Antti's little brother — hide and Heikki finds only the grandfather. He doesn't like the way Heikki is "betraying his friends" and tries to go after Heikki with his tractor, only getting hit by it and send to the hospital. While he's not present to supervise Antti and Jussi, they decide to sell alcohol to minors — which has been strictly forbidden by the grandfather — before leaving the town for good. This leads to Roope's death among five other children: they crash a car driving it under the influence. After the tragedy the townsfolk beat Antti and Jussi up and tell them to leave for good. They however refuse to leave, and finally they do something that will put them in prison - the duo tries to flee, and they kill one of the police officers — After that they go on their separate ways, and Antti gets arrested. Jussi is still trying to flee, but Heikki finds him and is taking him to the station. They drive on a bridge when Jussi grabs the wheel, which makes them fall into the river. At that moment Heikki reveals to Jussi why he's been trying to help them, and he watches while Jussi, handcuffed to the car door, sinks with the car to the river.

== Cast ==
- Samuli Edelmann as Jussi Murikka
- Juha Veijonen as Antti Karhu
- Teemu Lehtilä as Heikki Grönberg
- Kalevi Haapoja as Grandfather Karhu
- Arttu Kapulainen as Roope Karhu
- Sari Havas as Sisko
- Eero Aho as Stig Nenonen
- Pia Latomäki as Paula
- Kari Väänänen as Törnqvist

== Reception ==
The film opened at number one at the Finnish box office before being replaced by fellow Finnish film, Ambush, the following week.

== See also ==
- List of submissions to the 72nd Academy Awards for Best Foreign Language Film
- List of Finnish submissions for the Academy Award for Best Foreign Language Film
