= Samuli Edelmann =

Finnish actor and singer (born 1968)

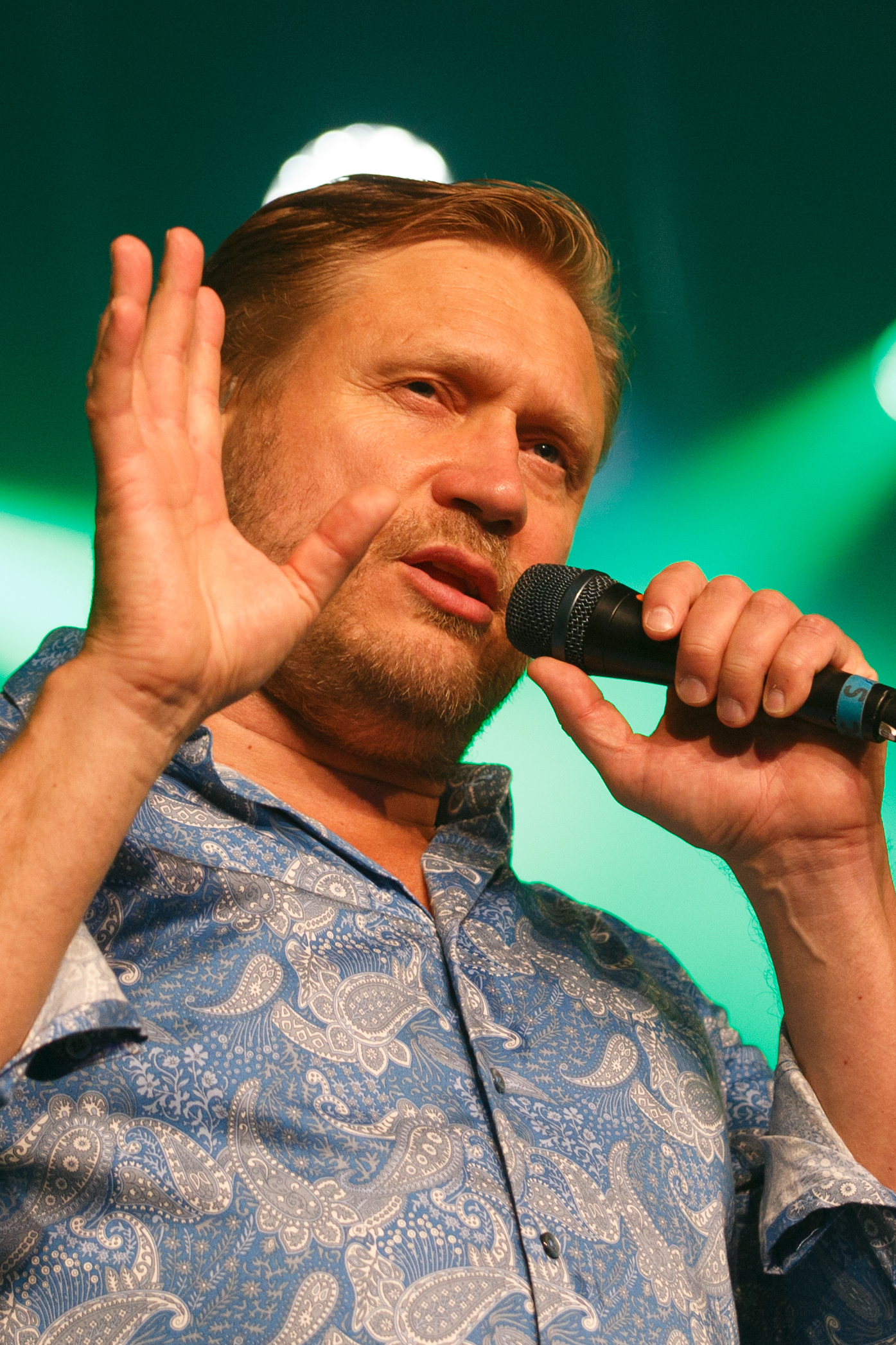
- Edelmann in 2019
- Born: Samuli Casimir Edelmann; 21 July 1968 (age 58); Pori, Finland
- Education: Theatre Academy of Finland (1991)
- Occupations: Actor, singer

Samuli Casimir Edelmann (born 21 July 1968) is a Finnish actor and singer.

== Family and career ==
Edelmann was born in Pori, Finland, the son of actress Marja-Leena Kouki and composer Toni Edelmann. He has two children with his ex-wife, Laura Tuomarila. In the spring of 2006, he and his family moved to Malta, and in late 2015, he and his family moved back to Finland. In 2018, Edelmann divorced.

=== Actor ===
Edelmann graduated from the Theatre Academy of Finland in 1991. Before graduating, he had acted in three movies: Talvisota and two Vääpeli Körmy movies. His role of Vähy in the movie Veturimiehet heiluttaa in 1992, however, was what shot him to fame. Some of his other well-known roles include Patrick in Romanovin kivet (1993), Jussi Murikka in Häjyt (1999), Roope in Levottomat (2000), Aki in Minä ja Morrison (2001) and Tomppa in Rööperi.

In addition to movies, he has acted in the TV series Vintiöt and Irtiottoja. He has also dubbed numerous series and movies, such as Tanoshii Moomin Ikka (TV series) and the part of Shrek in the movie of the same name.

In 2011, he appeared in Mission: Impossible – Ghost Protocol in the role of henchman Wistrom.

=== Singer ===
Edelmann rose to fame as a singer in 1991 with his song "Pienestä kii". The same year, his song "Peggy" was a candidate for the Eurovision Song Contest; however, it did not become the Finnish entry that year. He sang a duet with Sani from Aikakone in 1995 called "Tuhat yötä", which was one of the most successful songs that year. Edelmann has also sung duets with Mikko Kuustonen, Laura Närhi, Cata Mansikka-aho, Mari Rantasila and Irina Björklund. Some of Edelmann's other songs include "(Sinä olet) Aurinko", which is commonly known as Ihana valo, "Kaikki tahtoo" and "Karavaanari".

Edelmann has also published an album by the name of Vaiheet, which has songs that his father, Toni Edelmann, has composed for texts by Hesse, Goethe, Shakespeare and Denisov.

Edelmann has been awarded three Emma awards: New Male Artist of the Year and two Artist of the Year awards. His three platinum and three gold albums make him one of Finland's best-selling male artists.

== Filmography ==
- The Glory and Misery of Human Life (Ihmiselon ihanuus ja kurjuus, 1988) - Martti Hongisto (young)
- Uimataidoton (1988) - Räyhäri
- The Winter War (Talvisota, 1989) - Private Mauri Haapasalo
- Vääpeli Körmy ja marsalkan sauva (1990) - Alokas Masa Iivanainen
- Moomin (1990–1991, TV Series) (Finnish voice, played Snork in episodes 1–52)
- Vääpeli Körmy ja vetenalaiset vehkeet (1991) - Alikersantti Jyväntölä
- Koskenkorva Cowboys (1992) - Lauri
- Goodbye Trainmen (Veturimiehet heiluttaa, 1992) - Lauri
- Vääpeli Körmy ja etelän hetelmät (1992) - Alikersantti Edelman
- The Romanov Stones (Romanovin kivet, 1993) - Patrick
- Iron Horsemen (1994) - Gas Station Thug
- Vääpeli Körmy - Taisteluni (1994) - Alokas Poju Ahvassaari
- The Tough Ones (Häjyt, 1999) - Jussi Murikka
- Return to Plainlands (Lakeuden kutsu, 2000) - Partanen nuorempi
- Restless (Levottomat, 2000) - Roope
- The South (Lomalla, 2000) - Samuli
- Me and Morrison (Minä ja Morrison, 2001) - Aki Tuominen
- Rollo and the Spirit of the Woods (Rölli ja metsänhenki, 2001) - Menninkäisten kylänvanhin
- Vares: Private Eye (Vares – yksityisetsivä, 2004) - Mikko Koitere
- Frozen Land (Paha maa, 2005) - 'Jartsa' Matikainen
- Winners and Losers (2005) - Flottis
- Cargo (2006) - Rhombus
- Man Exposed (Riisuttu mies, 2006) - Antti Pitkänen
- Rock'n Roll Never Dies (2006) - Tapani 'Tiger' Hietanen
- Hellsinki (Rööperi, 2009) - Tomppa
- Johan Falk: National Target (2009) - Mikhael Stukalov
- Princess (Prinsessa, 2010) - Johan Grotenfelt
- Tappajan näköinen mies (2011, TV Series) - Viktor Kärppä
- Home Sweet Home (Kotirauha, 2011) - Sami Luoto
- Mission: Impossible – Ghost Protocol (2011) - Wistrom
- Tie pohjoiseen (2012) - Timo Porola
- Tumman veden päällä (2013) - Pete's father
- The Girl King (2015) - King Gustav II Adolf
- Tale of a Lake (2016) - narrator
- Tappajan näköinen mies (2016) - Viktor Kärppä
- Presidentti (2017, TV Series) - Henri Talvio
- 95 (2017) - Aarne
- Viulisti (2018) - Jaakko / Karin's Husband
- The Last Ones (2020) - Tatu
- Reindeer Mafia (2023) - Sameli

== Discography ==
=== Albums ===
- Oi taivas (1990) (re-released 1992)
- Peggy – Pienestä kii (1991, FIN No. 1, platinum)
- Yön valot (1992, FIN #11)
- Parhaat (1993) (compilation)
- Ihana valo (1994, FIN # 5, platinum)
- Tuhat yötä (1995, FIN No. 7, gold)
- Vaiheet (1997, FIN #8)
- Greatest Hits (1998, FIN No. 3, gold) (compilation)
- Kaikki tahtoo (2001, FIN No. 1, platinum)
- Enkelten tuli (2003, FIN No. 2, gold)
- Yksi ilta – (Samuli Edelmann & Mikko Kuustonen) (2005) (Live-DVD)
- Vain elämää : 1992–2005 (2005, FIN No. 21, gold) (compilation)
- Voittola (2006, FIN #14)
- Virsiä (2007, FIN No. 1, 2× platinum)
- Virsiä 2 (2008, FIN No. 2, platinum)
- Maa on niin kaunis – Virsiä 3 (2009, FIN No. 4, gold)
- Pimeä onni – (Samuli Edelmann & Jippu) (2010, FIN No. 2, platinum)
- The Essential (2011) (compilation)
- Pienellä kivellä (2011, FIN #3)
- Rakastetuimmat Virret (2011, FIN #34) (compilation)
- Hiljaisuuden Valo – Joululauluja (2012, FIN No. 3 (Christmas album)
- Mahdollisuus (2014, FIN #3)
- Samuli Edelmann (2016, FIN #24)

Chart positions (Finnish Albums Chart) taken from the book Sisältää hitin (Finnish Chart History since 1972) and from finnishcharts.com. Album certification awards information taken from IFPI (International Federation of the Phonographic Industry) Finland's site

=== Singles ===
- Oi taivas (1990)
- Outi (1990)
- Lasihelmi / Aika vie kulkijaa (1990)
- Rakkaus saa laulamaan / Viimeinen yö (1991)
- Peggy (1991) – Airplay No. 1
- Pienestä kii (1991) – Airplay No. 1
- Paratiisilinnut (1991) – Airplay No. 6
- Viimeinen kesä (1992) – Top 50 No. 39
- Prinssikerjäläinen (1992)
- Sinun silmiesi tähden (1992) – Top 50 No. 33, Airplay No. 8
- Veljenmalja (1992) – Top 50 No. 14
- Yön valot (1992) – Top 50 # 13, Airplay No. 5
- Pahat kielet (1993)
- Oma planeetta (duet with Janita) (1993) – Top 50 No. 3, Airplay # 1
- Ihana ilta (1994) – Top 50 No. 2, Airplay No. 1
- (Sinä olet) aurinko (1994) – Finnish Singles Chart No. 5, Top 50 No. 1, Airplay No. 1
- Palava pää (1994) – Top 50 No. 4, Airplay No. 6
- Sinun kanssasi / Postikortti (1994)
- In Un Altro Mondo (1994) [Promo]
- Tuhat yötä (duet with Sani) (1995) – Finnish Singles Chart No. 1, Top 50 # 1, Airplay # 1
- Valoista kirkkain (1995) – Top 50 No. 2, Airplay # 1
- Sinusta lauluni teen (1995) – Top 50 # 31
- Yöjuna (1996) – Top 50 No. 42
- Armaan läheisyys (1997) – Top 50 No. 19
- Huilunsoittaja (1997) – Top 50 # 48
- Sonetti 18 (duet with Sani) (1997)
- Olen luonasi sun (duet with Sani) (1998) – Top 50 No. 2, Airplay No. 1
- Mä jaksan odottaa / Peggy (1998)
- Levottomat (duet with Cata Mansikka-aho) (2000) – Top 50 No. 6, Airplay No. 3
- Kaikki tahtoo (2001) – Top 50 No. 4, Airplay No. 1
- Sininen sointu (2001) – Top 50 No. 6, Airplay No. 3
- Lokki ja mä (duet with Mari Rantasila) (2001) – Top 50 No. 43
- Karavaanari (2001) – Top 50 No. 39
- Juhlat alkakoon (2001)
- Enkelten tuli (2003) – Top 50 No. 2, Airplay No. 1
- Mun sydämellä on kypärä (2003) – Top 50 No. 15
- Välillä (2003) – Top 50 No. 36
- Pitkä kuuma kesä (2003)
- Veli älä jätä (duet with Mikko Kuustonen) (2004) – Top 50 No. 18, Airplay No. 4
- Kirkossa (2005)
- Amalia (2006) – Top 50 No. 22, Airplay No. 3
- Ruma mies (2006) – Top 50 No. 14, Airplay No. 8
- Samat kukat (2006)
- Älä polta mua karrelle (2007) – Top 50 No. 35
- Peltoniemen Hintriikan surumarssi (2008)
- Suojelusenkeli (Maan korvessa kulkevi lapsosen tie) (2008)
- Jos sä tahdot niin (duet with Jippu) (2009) – Finnish Singles Chart No. 1, Finnish Download Chart No. 1, Airplay No. 3
- Pimeä onni (duet with Jippu) (2010) – Finnish Singles Chart No. 17, Finnish Download Chart No. 15, Airplay No. 3
- Joo, joo, mä rakastan sua (duet with Jippu) (2011)
- Ei mitään hätää (2011) – Finnish Singles Chart No. 8, Finnish Download Chart No. 8, Airplay No. 2
- Se viimeinen (2011) – Airplay No. 10
- Tähtipölyä (2012) – Airplay No. 6
- Tuomittuna kulkemaan (2012) – with Vesa-Matti Loiri
- Parempi mies (2013) – Cheek feat. Samuli Edelmann, No. 6
- Teit meistä kauniin (2014) – Vain elämää, Season 3, Toni Wirtanen Day, No. 12

All charts refer to Finnish Charts. Chart positions from Finnish Singles Chart (Top 20 Singles), Rumba Magazine's Top 50 Hits Chart (Top 50 Hits) (which was published until 2007), Finnish Download Chart (Top 30 Download) and Music Control's Finnish Airplay Chart (Top 20/Top 100).

== See also ==
- List of best-selling music artists in Finland
