= Frozen Land =

- Poster
- Finnish: Paha maa
- Directed by: Aku Louhimies
- Written by: Aku Louhimies
- Produced by: Markus Selin
- Starring: Jasper Pääkkönen, Mikko Leppilampi, Pamela Tola
- Cinematography: Rauno Ronkainen
- Edited by: Samu Heikkilä
- Distributed by: Buena Vista International
- Release date: 14 January 2005
- Running time: 130 minutes
- Country: Finland
- Language: Finnish

Frozen Land (Finnish: Paha maa) is a 2005 Finnish drama film directed and written by Aku Louhimies starring Jasper Pääkkönen, Mikko Leppilampi and Pamela Tola. The film's plot is based on Leo Tolstoy's 1911 posthumously published story "The Forged Coupon", part one, which was also the basis for Robert Bresson's 1983 film L'Argent.

== Plot ==
When a schoolteacher gets fired from his teaching job (at the same time, Antti joins as a new teacher) he projects his bad mood at his troubled teenage son Niko (Jasper Pääkkönen) and evicts Niko from his apartment. On New Year's Eve, high on drugs, Niko forges a 500 euro banknote at his friend Tuomas' other friend's party and buys a CD player from a pawnshop since his father has sold the old one to get money for alcohol. Seeing a counterfeit 500-euro banknote, the shop owner gets furious and beats the woman Niko had paid with the counterfeit money. When, Isto Virtanen sells his widescreen TV to the same store, the shop owner offers 510 euros and puts in the counterfeit note. When Isto pays with the counterfeit 500 euro note at a restaurant, he gets arrested. When Isto gets out of, he finds out that his car has ended up being vandalized.

Isto breaks into Matikainen's car dealership, which's alarm devices are out of order, so he gets on his travels with a stolen car. Matikainen puts a bad feeling around and takes his car away from the traveling vacuum cleaner dealer Teuvo Hurskanen, because the installments are late. Teuvo talks about it in the AA club. In the evening, he happens to end up in the same motel with Isto. The well-behaved Isto starts mocking Teuvo at the bar because he doesn't drink alcohol. Teuvo eventually gives up and starts drinking. Together, they bring a woman to Isto's room. Isto and the woman end up in bed and Teuvo is rejected after trying to join in. Teuvo loses his self-control and knocks them both to death with his vacuum cleaner. Teuvo regrets his act in the morning and tries to commit suicide by suffocating but give up. Later, police officer Hannele arrives at the motel and finds the bodies in Isto's room. In the same night of Tuomas' friend's party, Tuomas and Niko break into the Certum company. Niko notices cops, but because of radio connection problem, he fails to get in touch with Tuomas. He quickly escapes the scene. Tuomas gets chased by the cops. He escapes to the rail yard, where police officer Hannele chases him, but crashes onto the track and the train runs over her, causing her death. Tuomas is sentenced to eight years in prison for murder. When Tuomas's sentence ends, Niko, now a teacher, receives him and gives him a 500 euro banknote and says that it's real. Tuomas returns home to Elina after his release and sees his son only once. The next day, Tuomas visits Hannele's husband, Antti. Tuomas tries to convince him that he did not commit the homicide. Tuomas and Antti go to the lake where Antti shoots Tuomas. The film ended with its opening scene, Tuomas' funeral, where Niko speaks.

== Cast ==
- Jasper Pääkkönen as Niko Smolander
- Mikko Leppilampi as Tuomas Mikael Saraste
- Pamela Tola as Elina Oravisto
- Petteri Summanen as Antti Arhamo
- Matleena Kuusniemi as Hannele Arhamo
- Mikko Kouki as Isto Virtanen
- Sulevi Peltola as Teuvo "Teukka" Hurskainen
- Pertti Sveholm as Pertti Smolander
- Samuli Edelmann as car seller "Jartsa" Matikainen
- Saara Pakkasvirta as shopkeeper's mother
- Pekka Valkeejärvi as shopkeeper
- Susanna Anteroinen as Headmaster
- Niklas Hellakoski as Konsta
- Emilia Suoperä as Maria, angel in the ambulance
- Jonathan Kajander as Joonatan "Jonttu" Arhamo

== Production ==
Pamela Tola said this movie was a traumatic experience for her. Everything was fine until her character had to attempt suicide by jumping off the balcony. The drop to the ground on the mattress was 20 meters, but she refused to jump without auxiliary cables, and she couldn't do the required volts in the air because she had acrophobia. According to many eyewitnesses, Aku Louhimies was furious about this. "He started teasing me so that I broke up, crying hysterically," Tola said. After that, Louhimies invented a rape scene in which Jasper Pääkkönen's character gave Tola drugs and raped her from behind against a sink. "It was uncomfortable and it hurt, but I didn't object because I had already 'ruined' everything," Tola said. According to Louhimies, the scene was invented together with the actors as a solution to Tola's character's suicide attempt.

== Awards ==
The film has won several awards:

- Athens International Film Festival 2005: Best Screenplay
- Bergen International Film Festival 2005: Jury Award
- Göteborg Film Festival 2005: Nordic Film Prize
- Jussi 2006:
  - Best Costume Design
  - Best Direction
  - Best Editing
  - Best Film
  - Best Script
  - Best Sound Design
  - Best Supporting Actor
  - Best Supporting Actress
- Leeds International Film Festival 2005: Golden Owl Award
- Lübeck Nordic Film Days 2005: NDR Promotion Prize – Honorable Mention
- 27th Moscow International Film Festival 2005: Special Jury Prize
