= Matleena Kuusniemi =

Finnish actress (born 1973)

- Born: 24 September 1973 (age 52); Pusula, Finland
- Occupation: Actress
- Years active: 1996–present

Matleena Kuusniemi (born 24 September 1973) is a Finnish actress. She attended the Helsinki Theatre Academy in the 1990s, and has since starred in several films and on television. Kuusniemi is known for her role as Pauliina Sorjonen in the television series Bordertown., and in 2016, she won Golden Venla for her role in the television series Koukussa.

== Personal life ==
Kuusniemi has two children and lives with Antti Mansikkamäki.

== Selected filmography ==
| Year | Title | Role | Notes |
|---|---|---|---|
| 2000 | Restless | Ilona | |
| 2004 | Trench Road | | |
| 2005 | Frozen Land | | |
| 2008 | The Home of Dark Butterflies | | |
| 2009 | Pihalla | | |
| 2012 | Naked Harbour | Sara | |
| 2016–2020 | Bordertown | Pauliina Sorjonen | |
| 2019 | Modern Men | Taina | |
