= Juha Veijonen =

Finnish actor (born 1959)

- Born: 29 August 1959 (age 66); Helsinki, Finland
- Occupation: Actor
- Years active: 1990-present

Juha Veijonen (born 29 August 1959) is a Finnish film actor. He appeared in more than sixty films since 1990.

== Selected filmography ==
Film
Year	Title	Role	Notes
2007	V2: Dead Angel	Jussi Vares	
2006	Saippuaprinssi		
2006	Matti: Hell Is for Heroes		
2004	Vares: Private Eye	Jussi Vares	
1999	The Tough Ones		

TV
Year	Title	Role	Notes
2006	Mogadishu Avenue		
2012	Salatut elämät	Mikael Salo	
1998	Ansa ja Oiva		
1994	Vintiöt		
