= Aleksi Mäkelä (director) =

Finnish film director (born 1969)

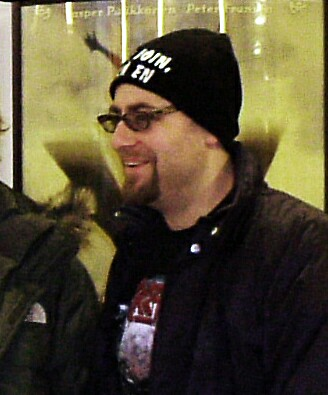
Mäkelä in 2006

Tane Aleksanteri ”Aleksi” Mäkelä (born 20 November 1969) is a Finnish film director and occasional actor. He is best known for having directed several popular films such as Häjyt (1999), Matti (2006) and Vares – yksityisetsivä (2004). During his career, he has also worked for television.

== Personal life ==
Aleksi Mäkelä's father was an actor Vesa Mäkelä (1947–2003).

== Selected filmography ==
=== Films ===
- The Romanov Stones (Romanovin kivet, 1993)
- Sunset Riders (Esa ja Vesa – auringonlaskun ratsastajat, 1994)
- The Tough Ones (Häjyt, 1999)
- The South (Lomalla, 2000)
- Bad Boys (Pahat pojat, 2003)
- Vares: Private Eye (Vares – yksityisetsivä, 2004)
- Matti: Hell Is for Heroes (Matti, 2006)
- V2: Dead Angel (V2 – Jäätynyt enkeli, 2007)
- Hellsinki (Rööperi, 2009)
- Life for Sale (Kotirauha, 2011)
- The Hijack That Went South (Kaappari, 2013)
- Kummeli V (2014)
- Love Records: Gimme Some Love (Love Records – Anna mulle Lovee, 2016)
- 95 (2017)

=== Television ===
- ''Syke (2015, 2017)
