= Solar Films =

Finnish film production company

Solar Films Inc Oy
- Founded: 1995; 31 years ago
- Founder: Jukka Helle
- Headquarters: Helsinki, Finland
- Products: Television series; Films
- Owner: Nordisk Film
- Parent: Egmont Group
- Subsidiaries: Liberty Production; Solar Republic
- Website: solarfilms.com

Solar Films Inc Oy is a Finnish film production company, which was founded in 1995. Solar Films' productions have won a total of 41 Jussi Awards, and three Oscar nominations.

Besides feature films and television drama, Solar Films have also produced thousands of hours of TV entertainment for Finnish TV channels. Solar Films is owned by Egmont and Markus Selin. The company's CEO is Jukka Helle. In 2009, Solar Films bought the majority of production company Bronson Club.
