= Jussi Award for Best Film =

Finnish film award

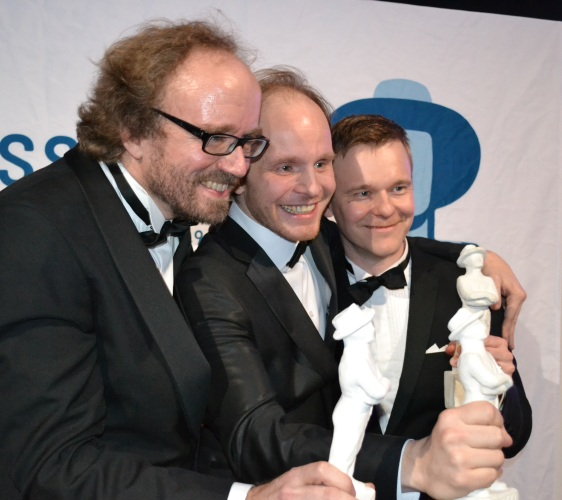
Aleksi Bardy, Dome Karukoski and Pekko Pesonen at the 2010 Jussi Award.

Jussi Award for Best Film is an award presented annually at the Jussi Awards by Filmiaura, a Finnish film organization founded in 1962. The 1st Jussi Awards ceremony was held in 1944, but the award for Best Film was introduced in 1986 at the 41st Jussi Awards where Shadows in Paradise won the first award. The category was absent for the next five years but the award was presented again at the 47th Jussi Awards, and has since been presented annually.

The Best Film award was presented to the awarded film's director, producer and the production company (with the exception of 1986) until 2008. Since 2008, the award has been given to the film's producer only.

== Winners and nominees ==
Year	Film	English title	Recipient(s)
1986 (41st)	Varjoja paratiisissa	Shadows in Paradise	Aki Kaurismäki, director ‡
1987 (42nd)	N/A		
1988 (43rd)	N/A		
1989 (44th)	N/A		
1990 (45th)	N/A		
1991 (46th)	N/A		
1992 (47th)	Tuhlaajapoika	The Prodigal Son	Veikko Aaltonen, director ‡ Aki Kaurismäki, producer ‡ Villealfa Filmproductions Oy, production company ‡
1993 (48th)	Onnen maa	The Land of Happiness	Markku Pölönen, director ‡ Kari Sara, producer ‡ Dada-Filmi, production company ‡
1994 (49th)	N/A		
1995 (50th)	Kivenpyörittäjän kylä	The Last Wedding	Markku Pölönen, director ‡ Kari Sara, producer ‡ Dada-Filmi, production company ‡
1996 (51st)	Kauas pilvet karkaavat	Drifting Clouds	Aki Kaurismäki, director/producer ‡ Sputnik Oy, production company ‡
1997 (52nd)	Sairaan kaunis maailma	Freakin' Beautiful World	Jarmo Lampela, director ‡ Mika Ritalahti, producer ‡ Lasihelmi Filmi Oy, production company ‡
1998 (53rd)	Kuningasjätkä	A Summer by the River	Markku Pölönen, director ‡ Kari Sara, producer ‡ Fennada-Filmi, production company ‡
1998 (53rd)	Säädyllinen murhenäytelmä	A Respectable Tragedy	Kaisa Rastimo, director Marko Äijö, producer Kinotaurus Oy, production company
1998 (53rd)	Tulennielijä	Fire-Eater	Pirjo Honkasalo, director Marko Röhr, producer Marko Röhr Productions Oy, production company
1999 (54th)	Rukajärven tie	Ambush	Olli Saarela, director ‡ Marko Röhr & Ilkka Y. L. Matila, producers ‡ MRP Matila & Röhr Productions Oy, production company ‡
1999 (54th)	Häjyt	The Tough Ones	Aleksi Mäkelä, director Markus Selin, producer Solar Films Inc. Oy, production company
1999 (54th)	Rakkaudella, Maire	Kiss Me in the Rain	Veikko Aaltonen, director Lasse Saarinen, producer Kinotar Oy, production company
1999 (54th)	Sokkotanssi	Blindfolded	Matti Ijäs, director Kari Sara, producer Dada-Filmi Oy, production company
2000 (55th)	Seitsemän laulua tundralta	Seven Songs from the Tundra	Anastasia Lapsui, co-director ‡ Markku Lehmuskallio, co-director ‡ Tuula Söderberg, producer ‡ Jörn Donner Productions Oy, production company ‡
2000 (55th)	Bad Luck Love	Bad Luck Love	Olli Saarela, director Anna Heiskanen, producer GNUfilms Oy, production company
2000 (55th)	Badding	Badding	Markku Pölönen, director Kari Sara, producer Fennada-Filmi Oy, production company
2000 (55th)	Pelon maantiede	The Geography of Fear	Auli Mantila, director Tero Kaukomaa, producer Blind Spot Pictures Oy, production company
2001 (56th)	Joki	The River	Jarmo Lampela, director ‡ Riikka Poulsen, producer ‡ Lasihelmi Filmi Oy, production company ‡
2002 (57th)	Mies vailla menneisyyttä	The Man Without a Past	Aki Kaurismäki, director ‡ Ilkka Mertsola, producer ‡ Sputnik Oy, production company ‡
2003 (58th)	Nousukausi	Upswing	Johanna Vuoksenmaa, director ‡ Lasse Saarinen, producer ‡ Kinotar Oy, production company ‡
2004 (59th)	Koirankynnen leikkaaja	Dog Nail Clipper	Markku Pölönen, director ‡ Kari Sara, producer ‡ Fennada Filmi, production company ‡
2005 (60th)	Paha maa	Frozen Land	Aku Louhimies, director ‡ Markus Selin, producer ‡ Solar Films, production company ‡
2006 (61st)	Laitakaupungin valot	Lights in the Dusk	Aki Kaurismäki, producer ‡ Sputnik Oy, production company ‡
2007 (62nd)	Musta jää	Black Ice	Kai Nordberg & Kaarle Aho, producers ‡ Making Movies, production company ‡
2008 (63rd)	Niko – Lentäjän poika	The Flight Before Christmas	Petteri Pasanen & Hannu Tuomainen, producers ‡
2009 (64th)	Postia pappi Jaakobille	Letters to Father Jacob	Lasse Saarinen & Rimbo Salomaa, producers ‡
2010 (65th)	Napapiirin sankarit	Lapland Odyssey	Aleksi Bardy, producer ‡
2011 (66th)	Le Havre	Le Havre	Aki Kaurismäki, producer ‡
2012 (67th)	Kohta 18	Almost 18	Maarit Lalli, producer ‡
2013 (68th)	Betoniyö	Concrete Night	Misha Jaari & Mark Lwoff, producers ‡
2014 (69th)	He ovat paenneet	They Have Escaped	Aleksi Bardy, producer ‡
2015 (70th)	Miekkailija	The Fencer	Kai Nordberg & Kaarle Aho, producers ‡
2016 (71st)	Hymyilevä mies	The Happiest Day in the Life of Olli Mäki	Jussi Rantamäki, producer ‡
2017 (72nd)	Ikitie	The Eternal Road	Ilkka Matila, producer ‡
2018 (73rd)	Tyhjiö	Void	Aleksi Salmenperä, producer ‡
2019 (74th)	Aurora	Aurora	Max Malka, producer ‡
2020 (75th)	Tove	Tove	Aleksi Bardy & Andrea Reuter, producers ‡
2021 (76th)	Hytti nro 6	Compartment No. 6	Jussi Rantamäki & Emilia Haukka, producers ‡
2022 (77th)	Tytöt tytöt tytöt	Girl Picture	Leila Lyytikäinen & Elina Pohjola, producers ‡
2023 (78th)	Mummola	Family Time	Jussi Rantamäki & Emilia Haukka, producers ‡
2024 (79th)	Myrskyluodon Maija	Stormskerry Maja	Jukka Helle, Hanna Virolainen & Markus Selin, producers ‡

== Multiple winners ==
Wins	Person
6	Aki Kaurismäki
4	Markku Pölönen
4	Kari Sara
4	Aleksi Bardy
4	Jussi Rantamäki
2	Kaarle Aho
2	Emilia Haukka
2	Jarmo Lampela
2	Kai Nordberg
2	Lasse Saarinen
2	Markus Selin
