= Priest of Evil =

- Film poster
- Finnish: Harjunpää & pahan pappi
- Directed by: Olli Saarela
- Starring: Peter Franzén; Irina Björklund
- Release date: 29 October 2010
- Running time: 106 minutes
- Country: Finland
- Language: Finnish

Priest of Evil (Finnish: Harjunpää & pahan pappi) is a 2010 Finnish mystery film directed by Olli Saarela. The film is loosely based upon a novel by Matti Yrjänä Joensuu.

== Cast ==
- Peter Franzén as Rikosylikonstaapeli Timo Harjunpää
- Irina Björklund as Elisa Harjunpää
- Sampo Sarkola as Johannes Heino
- Jenni Banerjee as Rikoskonstaapeli Onerva Nykänen
- Rosa Salomaa as Paulina Harjunpää
- Niilo Syväoja as Matti
- Jorma Tommila as Matias Krankke
- Ville Virtanen as Rikoskomisario Mäki
- Tommi Korpela as Kengu
- Maria Järvenhelmi as Cessi
