= Quest for a Heart =

- Directed by: Pekka Lehtosaari
- Written by: Pekka Lehtosaari; Allu Tuppurainen (characters; uncredited)
- Produced by: Marko Röhr; Vladimir Taubkin; Andre Sikojev; Stefan Beiten; Mike Downey; Michael Henrichs; Zorana Piggott; Sophokles Tasioulis; Sam Taylor; Nikolaus Weil
- Music by: Tuomas Kantelinen
- Production companies: MRP Matila Röhr Productions; Greenlight Media AG; Film and Music Entertainment (F&ME); Kontakt Production Center
- Distributed by: Nordisk Film (Finland); HB Films (UK)
- Release date: 14 December 2007
- Running time: 78 minutes
- Countries: Finland; Germany; United Kingdom; Russia
- Languages: Finnish; German; English; Russian
- Budget: €5,200,000
- Box office: $3,133,499

Quest for a Heart (Finnish: Röllin sydän) is a 2007 animated film directed by Pekka Lehtosaari. It is based on the Rölli character created by Allu Tuppurainen, and while it is the third Rölli film (previous films are Rolli: Amazing Tales from 1991 and Rollo and the Spirit of the Woods from 2001), it is also the first Rölli animation. It is also one of the first feature-length animated films produced in Finland, before that an animated adaptation of Seven Brothers was released in 1979, Santa Claus and the Magic Drum was released in 1996 and The Emperor's Secret in 2006. With its over 5 million euro budget, Quest for a Heart is one of the most expensive Finnish films.

The film won the Best Animation Award at the German Schlingel Film Festival in October 2008 and at the Chicago Children's Film Festival in November 2008.

== Plot ==
The story revolves around Rölli the troll who accompanies a spunky elf girl named Milli on a quest to find a magical heart that will save the trolls' village from being turned to stone, despite the fact that trolls and elves are completely opposite in nature.

== Cast ==
=== Finnish cast ===
- Allu Tuppurainen as Rölli
- Saija Lentonen as Millie the Elf
- Esa Saario as Elder/Sage of the Sauna/Narrator
- Jyrki Kovaleff as Atonal
- Matti Ranin as Longwind
- Aarre Karén as Footman
- Maria Järvenhelmi as Princess / Frog
- Pekka Lehtosaari as additional voices

=== English cast ===
- Mackenzie Crook as Rölli
- Lisa Stansfield as Millie the Elf
- Roger Hammond as Elder
- Gary Martin as Sage of the Sauna
- Jim McManus as Atonal
- Ian Thompson as Longwind
- William Vanderpuye as Footman
- Jo Wyatt as Princess / Frog
- James Greene as Narrator

== Home media ==
The film was released on DVD in most European territories, and was released as a direct-to-video film in United Kingdom on DVD by HB Films.
