= Matti Yrjänä Joensuu =

Finnish writer (1948–2011)

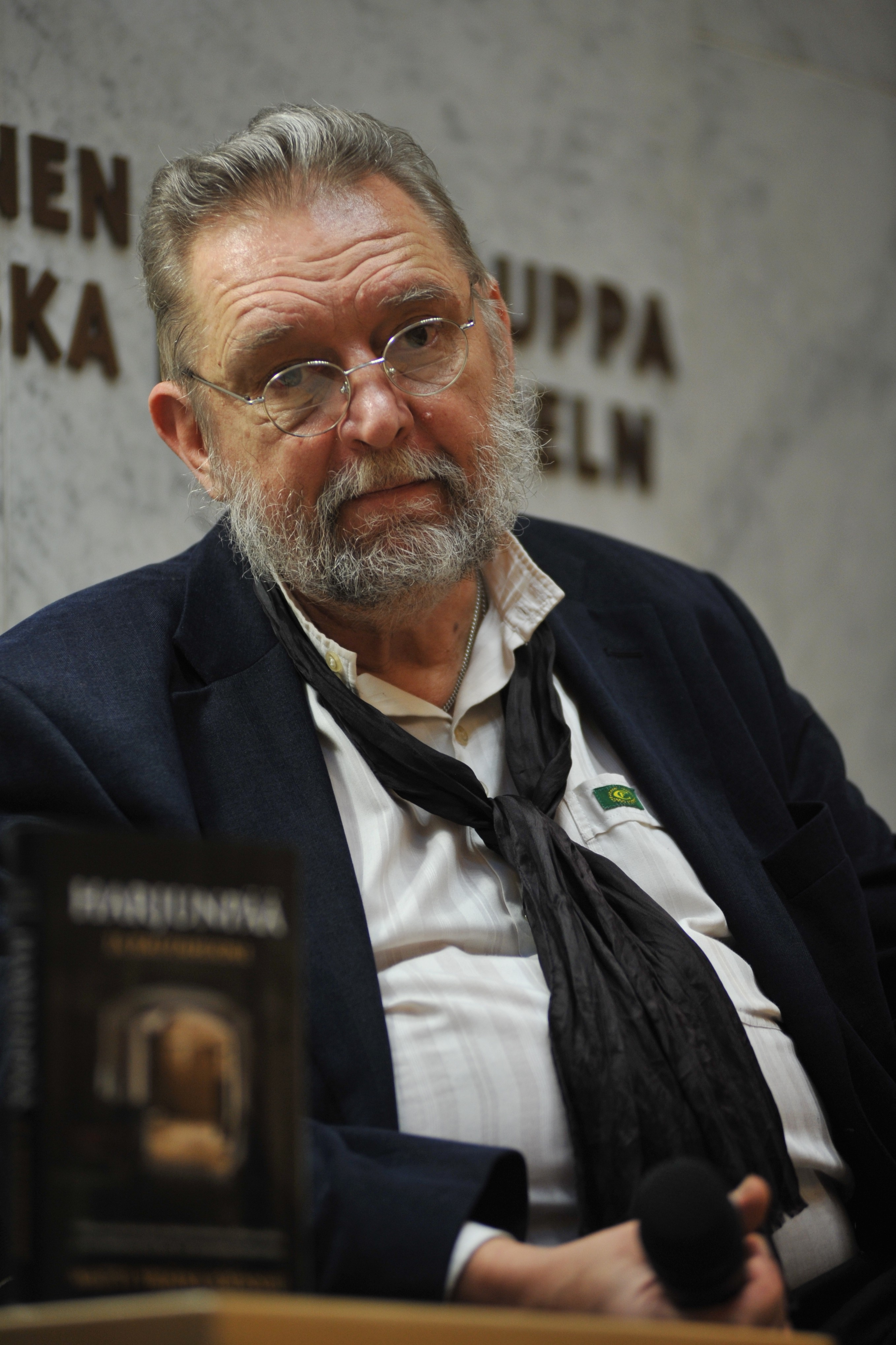
- Matti Yrjänä Joensuu in 2010
- Born: 31 October 1948; Helsinki, Finland
- Died: 4 December 2011 (aged 63); Valkeakoski, Finland
- Occupation: Author
- Writing career
- Years active: 1976–2010
- Genre: Crime fiction
- Notable work: Timo Harjunpää series

Matti Yrjänä Joensuu (31 October 1948– 4 December 2011) was a Finnish writer of crime fiction. He has been awarded the State's Literature Prize (1982), Vuoden johtolanka prize (1985, 1994, 2004), and he has been nominated for two Finlandias. He received the Martin Beck Award in 1987.

The protagonist of Joensuu's novels, the senior constable Timo Harjunpää, is a sympathetic character who is equally human about the criminals he encounters in his work as his family. Joensuu also describes the world of thought of his people. The surname Harjunpää writer borrowed from 1966 from a deceased constable Reino Harjunpää.

Joensuu's Harjunpää stories have also been adapted for Film & TV. Joensuu's work has been translated into English, Bulgarian, Dutch, Italian, Norwegian, French, Swedish, German, Slovak, Danish, Hungarian, Armenian, Russian and Estonian.

== Timo Harjunpää novels ==
Joensuu has written several novels about the personal life and work of policeman Timo Harjunpää. He is a very credible and pleasant man, who treats the criminals as humanely as his own family, which consists of Timo, his wife Elisa and three children (Valpuri, Pipsa and Pauliina). Another major character is Harjunpää's police partner Onerva Nykänen.

=== List of Harjunpää novels ===
- Väkivallan virkamies (1976)
- Possu ja paavin panttivangit (1977)
- Harjunpää ja pyromaani (1978)
- Harjunpää ja kapteeni Karhu (1981)
- Harjunpää ja ahdistelija (1982)
- Harjunpää ja poliisin poika (1983) (Harjunpää and the Stone Murders, translated in English by Raili Taylor)
- Harjunpää ja heimolaiset (1984)
- Harjunpää ja rakkauden lait (1985)
- Harjunpää ja kiusantekijät (1986)
- Harjunpää ja rakkauden nälkä (1993) (To Steal Her Love, translated in English by David Hackston)
- Harjunpää ja pahan pappi (2003) (The Priest of Evil, translated in English by David Hackston)
- Harjunpää ja rautahuone (2010)

=== Harjunpää adaptations ===
Year of release	Title	Harjunpää actor	Media type
1983	Harjunpää och kalla döden / Harjunpää ja kylmä kuolema	Johan Simberg	TV
1985	Harjunpää och antastaren / Harjunpää ja ahdistelija	Johan Simberg	TV
1993	Harjunpää ja kiusantekijät	Kari Heiskanen	Film
1995	Harjunpää ja heimolaiset	Kari Heiskanen	TV
2007	Rakkauden nälkä	Markku Maalismaa	TV
2010	Harjunpää & pahan pappi (Priest of Evil)	Peter Franzén	Film
2022	Harjunpää	Olli Rahkonen	TV
