= Three Wise Men (2008 film) =

- Directed by: Mika Kaurismäki
- Starring: Kari Heiskanen; Pertti Sveholm
- Release date: 5 September 2008 (TIFF)
- Running time: 1h 45min
- Country: Finland
- Language: Finnish

Three Wise Men (Finnish: Kolme viisasta miestä) is a 2008 Finnish drama film directed by Mika Kaurismäki.

== Cast ==
- Kari Heiskanen - Erkki
- Pertti Sveholm - Matti
- Timo Torikka - Rauno
- Irina Björklund - Magdaleena
- Tommi Eronen - Tero
- Elena Spirina - Taina
- Pirkko Hämäläinen - Tiina
- Riitta Havukainen - Riitta
- Aake Kalliala - Karaoke host
- Peter Franzén - Santa Claus
