= Taivas tiellä =

- Directed by: Johanna Vuoksenmaa
- Written by: Johanna Vuoksenmaa
- Produced by: Petteri Backman
- Starring: See below
- Cinematography: Peter Flinckenberg
- Edited by: Kimmo Kohtamäki
- Music by: Kerkko Koskinen
- Release date: 30 March 2000
- Running time: 34 minutes
- Country: Finland
- Language: Finnish

Taivas tiellä is a 2000 Finnish film by Johanna Vuoksenmaa who wrote the screenplay and directed. The film is also known as True Love Waits (International English title).

== Plot summary ==
In the context of the film, for the past years, 62-year-old Helmi has been taking care of her demanding mother. When her mother dies, she is suddenly able to do a lot of things she has not been able to do for a very long time and she is courted by the much younger leader of her church choir.

== Cast ==
- Marja Packalén as Helmi
- Peter Franzén as Markku
- Kari Väänänen as Alma / Pappi
- Tuula Nyman as Alma (Ääni) (voice)
- Riitta Elstelä as Saimi
- Åke Lindman as Niilo
- Pertti Sveholm as Puiston Pentti
- Jani Karvinen as Gallup-Poika
- Tauno Satomaa as Immanuel-Kanttori
- Ossi Lehtinen as Pihan Poika
- Maria Järvenhelmi as Katri
- Anni Koskinen as Katrin tytär (Katri's Daughter)
- Ossi Koskinen as Katrin Poika (Katri's Son)
- Merja Pietilä as Myyjä (Salesgirl)
- Heli Sirviö as Myyjä (Salesgirl)
- Helena Rängman as Minna
- Johannes Lahtela as Seksikaupan Myyjä (Salesman at Sex Shop)
- Eeva-Riitta Heikkinen as Morsian (Bride)
- Eero Järvinen as Sulhanen (Groom)
- Pirjo-Riitta Forström as Morsiamen äiti (Mother of the Bride)

== Awards ==
The film won the Audience award at the 2000 Uppsala International Short Film Festival.
