= The Eternal Road =

The Eternal Road may refer to:

- The Eternal Road (opera), opera by Kurt Weill
- The Eternal Road, novel by Antti Tuuri
- The Eternal Road (film), 2017 Finnish drama film based on the novel
