= The Year of the Wolf =

- Original Finnish film poster
- Directed by: Olli Saarela
- Starring: Krista Kosonen; Kari Heiskanen
- Music by: Tuomas Kantelinen
- Release date: 26 January 2007 (GIFF)
- Running time: 1h 35min
- Country: Finland
- Language: Finnish

The Year of the Wolf (Finnish: Suden vuosi) is a 2007 Finnish drama film directed by Olli Saarela. It is an unconventional love story about a young and talented student, Sari (Krista Kosonen), suffering from epilepsy, and a middle-aged lecturer Mikko (Kari Heiskanen), who is immersed in his own world in the 18th century poetry.

== Cast ==
- Krista Kosonen as Sari Karaslahti
- Kari Heiskanen as Mikko Groman
- Johanna af Schultén as Mikaela
- Kai Vaine as Ilari
- Ville Virtanen as Leif
- Katariina Kaitue as Marjatta Jokela
- Kristiina Halttu as Sari's mother
- Jukka Puotila as Sari's father
- Anne-Mari Alaspää as Riikka
- Aksa Korttila as Lotta
- Jorma Tommila as Jarkko Salminen
