= The Eternal Road (film) =

2017 Finnish drama film

- Film Poster
- Directed by: Antti-Jussi Annila
- Written by: Antti-Jussi Annila; Aku Louhimies (Screenplay); Antti Tuuri (Novel and Screenplay)
- Produced by: Ilkka Matila
- Starring: Tommi Korpela; Sidse Babett Knudsen; Hannu-Pekka Björkman; Irina Björklund; Ville Virtanen
- Cinematography: Rauno Ronkainen
- Edited by: Tambet Tasuja
- Music by: Kalle Gustafsson Jerneholm^{[:sv]} Ian Perso; Panu Aaltio; Tuomas Kantelinen
- Production companies: Matila Röhr Productions; Taska Film; Anagram; Film i Väst
- Distributed by: Nordisk Film
- Release date: August 22, 2017 (Finland)
- Running time: 103 minutes
- Countries: Finland; Estonia; Sweden
- Languages: Finnish; English; Russian

The Eternal Road (Finnish: Ikitie) is a 2017 drama film, based on a novel by Antti Tuuri, who also co-wrote the screenplay. The film was directed by Antti-Jussi Annila and stars Tommi Korpela, Sidse Babett Knudsen, Hannu-Pekka Björkman, Irina Björklund and Ville Virtanen. The movie is about American Finn immigrants in the Soviet Union and their fate in Stalin's persecutions in the late 1930s.

The film was edited and shot in Estonia in lieu of locations in Karelia. This was also the last film Lembit Ulfsak acted in before his death on 22 March 2017.

== Plot ==
Jussi Ketola, a Finnish emigrant to the United States, has escaped Great Depression with his family by returning to Finland, a nation still sharply divided after the 1917 Finnish Civil War between the victorious anti-communist Whites and the communist Reds. A socialist and pacifist, Jussi falls under the gaze of right-wing nationalists of the Lapua Movement, who believe him to be a Red. One night in 1931, Jussi is abducted from his home by local Lapua Movement members, initially intending to force him on the Eternal Road across the border to Soviet Russia, but deciding instead to execute him. Jussi escapes, but receives a gunshot wound just as he reaches the border. He is taken to a hospital in Petrozavodsk, capital of Soviet Karelia, where he recovers. Jussi is forced to take on a new name — Jussi Kari — and is instructed to prove he is not an anti-Soviet spy by reporting to Kallonen, a Finnish-speaking official of the NKVD, about suspected anti-Soviet activity in his new community. This new community is a kolkhoz (collective farm) called Hopea, founded by Finnish Americans and Finnish Canadians who migrated to Karelia in the early 1930s to help build the "worker's paradise" of the Soviet Union. Prevented from returning to his family in Finland, and navigating continual pressure from the NKVD's Kallonen, Jussi nevertheless finds a new life and a new family. But Stalin's persecutions have begun, and eventually residents of Hopea, including Jussi's new family, fall victim to the Great Purge of 1937. Jussi, however, is spared from execution, but is put to forced labor at another collective farm. When Kallonen comes to interrogate him, Jussi attacks him, takes his car, and finds his way to the border, returning to his Finnish family.

== Cast ==
- Tommi Korpela as Jussi Ketola
- Sidse Babett Knudsen as Sara Ketola
- Hannu-Pekka Björkman as Kallonen
- Irina Björklund as Sofia
- Sampo Sarkola as Strang
- Ville Virtanen as John Hill
- Jonna Järnefelt as Ella
- Eedit Patrakka as Mary (age 8)
- Rosa Salomaa as Mary (age 14)
- Helen Söderqvist as Martta Hill
- Antti Virmavirta as Mäki
- Eeti Salovuori as Pauli
- Lembit Ulfsak as Novikov

== Reception ==
The film was nominated in 13 categories at the 2018 Jussi Awards, winning in the categories of Best Picture, Best Director (for Annila), Best Supporting Actress (for Sidse Babett Knudsen), and Best Supporting Actor (for Hannu-Pekka Björkman). Other nominations included Best Screenplay (for Annila, Louhimies and Tuuri) and Best Actor (for Tommi Korpela).

Jessica Kiang from Variety gave the film a negative review, voicing criticism on the writing: "It's hard to warm to Ketola as the kind of hero who could warrant such epic storytelling. Much is made, at the outset, of his overweening desire to get back to his Finnish family. But then he has his candles lit by Sara, and suddenly they're in church baptizing their newborn (the religiosity of the inhabitants, in vehemently secular communist Russia, is another tantalizing avenue barely explored). And a title tells us this is only 1932, and so Ketola appears to have pined for his Finnish wife and kids for mere months, before establishing a new family on the farm."

=== Accolades ===
The Eternal Road garnered thirteen nominations, which was the greatest amount for that year at Jussi Awards. Kalju Kivi is the first Estonian in the Jussi Awards history to have won.

| Year | Award / Film Festival | Category | Recipient(s) | Result | Ref(s) |
|---|---|---|---|---|---|
| 2018 | Jussi Awards | Best Film | Ilkka Matila | Won | |
| 2018 | Jussi Awards | Best Director | Antti-Jussi Annila | Won | |
| 2018 | Jussi Awards | Best Actor | Tommi Korpela | Nominated | |
| 2018 | Jussi Awards | Best Supporting Actor | Hannu-Pekka Björkman | Won | |
| 2018 | Jussi Awards | Best Supporting Actress | Sidse Babett Knudsen | Won | |
| 2018 | Jussi Awards | Best Script | Antti Tuuri, Antti-Jussi Annila, Aku Louhimies | Nominated | |
| 2018 | Jussi Awards | Best Cinematography | Rauno Ronkainen | Won | |
| 2018 | Jussi Awards | Best Editing | Tambet Tasuja | Nominated | |
| 2018 | Jussi Awards | Best Set Design | Kalju Kivi | Won | |
| 2018 | Jussi Awards | Best Costume Design | Eugen Tamberg | Nominated | |
| 2018 | Jussi Awards | Best Makeup Design | Riikka Virtanen | Nominated | |
| 2018 | Jussi Awards | Best Music | Ian Person, Kalle Gustafsson Järneholm, Panu Aaltio, Tuomas Kantelinen | Nominated | |
| 2018 | Jussi Awards | Best Sound Design | Fredrik Dalenfjäll | Nominated | |

== See also ==
- The Forsaken: An American Tragedy in Stalin's Russia
- Foreign workers in the Soviet Union
