= Eila (film) =

2003 Finnish film

- Directed by: Jarmo Lampela
- Written by: Tove Idström
- Produced by: Petri Jokiranta; Tero Kaukomaa
- Starring: Sari Mällinen
- Cinematography: Harri Räty
- Release date: 14 March 2003
- Running time: 94 minutes
- Country: Finland
- Language: Finnish

Eila is a 2003 Finnish drama film directed by Jarmo Lampela. It was entered into the 25th Moscow International Film Festival.

== Cast ==
- Sari Mällinen as Eila Salonen
- Ilkka Koivula as Timo
- Hannes Suominen as Mika
- Kristiina Halkola as Pirkko Karvinen
- Johanna Kerttula as Mari Lainio
- Kari Hietalahti as Kai Pylkkänen
- Aino Lehtimäki as Laina
- Irja Matikainen as Laskupää
- Juha Muje as Sauli Korpivuori
- Elina Hietala as Jonna
- Hannu-Pekka Björkman as Eero
