= Ilkka Koivula =

Finnish actor

- Born: 16 March 1966 (age 60); Ranua, Finland
- Occupation: Actor
- Years active: 1988-present

Ilkka Koivula (born 16 March 1966) is a Finnish actor. He has appeared in 28 films and television shows since 1988. He starred in the film Lights in the Dusk, which was entered into the 2006 Cannes Film Festival.

== Selected filmography ==
- Homebound (1989)
- Freakin' Beautiful World (1997)
- Bad Luck Love (2000)
- Badding (2000)
- Rentun Ruusu (2001)
- Eila (2003)
- Lights in the Dusk (2006)
- Sisu (2022)
- Stop Nyqvist (2022)
- Prisons (2024)
- Kalevala: The Story of Kullervo (2026)
