= Badding (film) =

- Theatrical release poster
- Directed by: Markku Pölönen
- Starring: Janne Reinikainen; Karoliina Blackburn
- Production company: Fennada-Filmi
- Distributed by: Buena Vista International
- Release date: 2 August 2000
- Running time: 1h 43min
- Country: Finland
- Language: Finnish

Badding is a 2000 Finnish biographical film about Finnish rock singer Rauli "Badding" Somerjoki.

The film was nominated for the Jussi Award for Best Film in 2001, but lost to Seven Songs from the Tundra.

== Cast ==
- Janne Reinikainen - Rauli "Badding" Somerjoki
- Karoliina Blackburn - Mari
- Peter Franzén - Ossi
- Puntti Valtonen - Arde
- Ilkka Koivula - Albert Hilton
- Pertti Koivula - Frans Hilton
- Vappu Jurkka - Äiti
- Hannu Virolainen - Yli-Laakio
- Jenni Rautawaara - Viettelijätär
- Orvokki Mäkinen - Naapurin mummo
- Petri Manninen - Radiotoimittaja
