= The House of Branching Love =

2009 Finnish comedy-drama film

- Directed by: Mika Kaurismäki
- Screenplay by: Mika Kaurismäki; Sami Keski-Vähälä
- Based on: Haarautuvan rakkauden talo by Petri Karra
- Produced by: Mika Kaurismäki
- Starring: Hannu-Pekka Björkman; Elina Knihtilä
- Cinematography: Rauno Ronkainen
- Edited by: Jukka Nykänen
- Production company: Marianna Films
- Release date: 21 August 2009 (Finland)
- Country: Finland
- Language: Finnish
- Budget: €1,370,398
- Box office: €1,213,751 (domestic)

The House of Branching Love (Finnish: Haarautuvan rakkauden talo) is a 2009 Finnish comedy-drama film directed by Mika Kaurismäki. It is based on the novel Haarautuvan rakkauden talo by Petri Karra. The film is about a married couple going through a divorce.

== Cast ==
- Hannu-Pekka Björkman as Juhani Helin
- Elina Knihtilä as Tuula Helin
- Kati Outinen as Yrsa
- Antti Reini as Wolffi
- Tommi Eronen as Pekka
- Irina Björklund as Marjut
- Maria Järvenhelmi as Kitty
- Kari Väänänen as Niilo
- Anna Easteden as Nina
- Ilkka Villi as Marco
- Antti Virmavirta as Timo
- Mari Perankoski as Tiina
- Timo Torikka as PK
