= Kalevala: The New Era =

- Finnish film poster
- Finnish: Kalevala – Uusi aika
- Directed by: Jari Halonen
- Written by: Jari Halonen
- Produced by: Jari Halonen
- Starring: Tommi Eronen; Ari Vakkilainen; Konsta Mäkelä; Tanjalotta Räikkä
- Cinematography: Päivi Kettunen
- Edited by: Akke Eklund
- Music by: Karl Sinkkonen
- Production company: Seppä Callahanin Filmimaailma
- Distributed by: VLMedia Oy
- Release date: 15 November 2013 (Finland)
- Running time: 110 minutes
- Country: Finland
- Language: Finnish
- Budget: €250,000
- Box office: $22,588 (worldwide)

Kalevala: The New Era (Finnish: Kalevala – Uusi aika) is a 2013 Finnish fantasy film directed by Jari Halonen. It loosely based on Finnish epic poetry, The Kalevala, taking place both in the ancient land of the Kalevala and also in modern Finland.

Director Halonen started working on his own Kalevala-themed film after his previous film, The Life of Aleksis Kivi, working on it for ten years. According to Halonen, Lönnrot's Kalevala has always been "misinterpreted" by Finns, and in his own vision, he wanted to emphasize that "the Kalevala is a song of praise for equal motherhood and holiness."

The film was premiered on 15 November 2013. The film, made with a budget of €250,000, turned out to be a box-office bomb and received a mostly negative reception from critics.

In 2015, the film was released on television as a three-part miniseries under the name Kalevala – Väinämöisen uusi laulu ("A New Song of Väinämöinen").

== Plot ==
The story moves through the eras of the ancient Kalevala as well as modern Finland. In the Kalevala, Väinämöinen (Ari Vakkilainen) and his troops defend the miracle machine Sampo against the attack of Louhi, the mistress of Pohjola, and the evil Viking (Konsta Mäkelä). In the modern-day Finland, an international large company, under the leadership of chairman Kurt Dudler (Konsta Mäkelä), is introducing a virtual service that targets its communication directly to the human mind with the help of bio-identification, which the new CEO, Sampo Väinölä (Tommi Eronen), opposes. When Sampo's father Väinö (Ari Vakkilainen) makes his son aware of the forces of the past, the boy realizes that he is involved in the ancient battle between Kalevala and Pohjola.

== Cast ==
- Tommi Eronen as Sampo Väinölä
- Ari Vakkilainen as Väinö Väinölä / Väinämöinen
- Konsta Mäkelä as Kurt Dutler / the Viking
- Tanjalotta Räikkä as Doris / Louhi
- Maija-Liisa Ström as Riitta, Sampo's wife / Ilmatar

The film also features the musician Olavi Uusivirta as role of Antti and director Jari Halonen as role of Seppo Ilmarinen.

== Reception ==
The film received a mostly negative reception from critics after release. Veli-Pekka Lehtonen from Helsingin Sanomat said the film only had "empty slogans." Tuomas Riskala from Iltalehti considered the film an ambitious failure, falling far short of its director's best work. "Halonen's vision of the national epic and ancient Finnishness is a shamanistic fantasy drama that hardly opens up to anyone but the author and his disciples," Riskala says in his review, concluding that "the whole thing turns into a jumble of stilted and unintentional comedy." Ville Suhonen from Filmihullu, on the other hand, describes the film as "an illusion dressed up beautifully."

== See also ==
- Sampo (film)
