= Allu Tuppurainen =

Finnish actor and screenwriter

- Born: 1 April 1951 (age 74); Kuopio, Finland
- Occupations: Actor, screenwriter

Allan Rauli Kristian "Allu" Tuppurainen (born 1 April 1951) is a Finnish actor and screenwriter residing in Vaasa. He began acting in Finnish film in the early 1970s and has made a number of appearances in Finnish film ever since, appearing in many films such as the 1983 James Bond spoof Agentti 000 ja kuoleman kurvit where he acted alongside actors such as Ilmari Saarelainen and Tenho Saurén.

Tuppurainen is best known for his role as the troll Rölli in the similarly named children's TV show and films. As well as starring as the main character, Tuppurainen has written and directed the show, and composed music for it. He released the music on albums which he has sold over 550,000 copies.

He has made several appearances on Finnish television in 2002 and 2004. In 2007 he scriptwrote and voice-acted in Röllin Sydän (Quest for a Heart).

== Filmography ==
- Quest for a Heart (2007)
- Headhunters (2004)
- Rölli ja metsänhenki (2001)
- Kaikki pelissä (1994)
- Rölli - hirmuisia kertomuksia (1991)
- Rölli (TV series) (1986–2001)
- Vapaa duunari Ville-Kalle (1984)
- Agent 000 and the Deadly Curves (1983)
- Likainen puolitusina (1982)
- Pi pi pil... pilleri (1982)

== Awards ==
- Honorary mention for Viitasaari film week (1992)
- Nuoret Kotkat children's act of the year (1998)
- Newspaper Pohjalainen's Vaasan Jaakko culture award (1999)

== See also ==
- List of best-selling music artists in Finland
