= Anna Easteden =

Finnish American actress

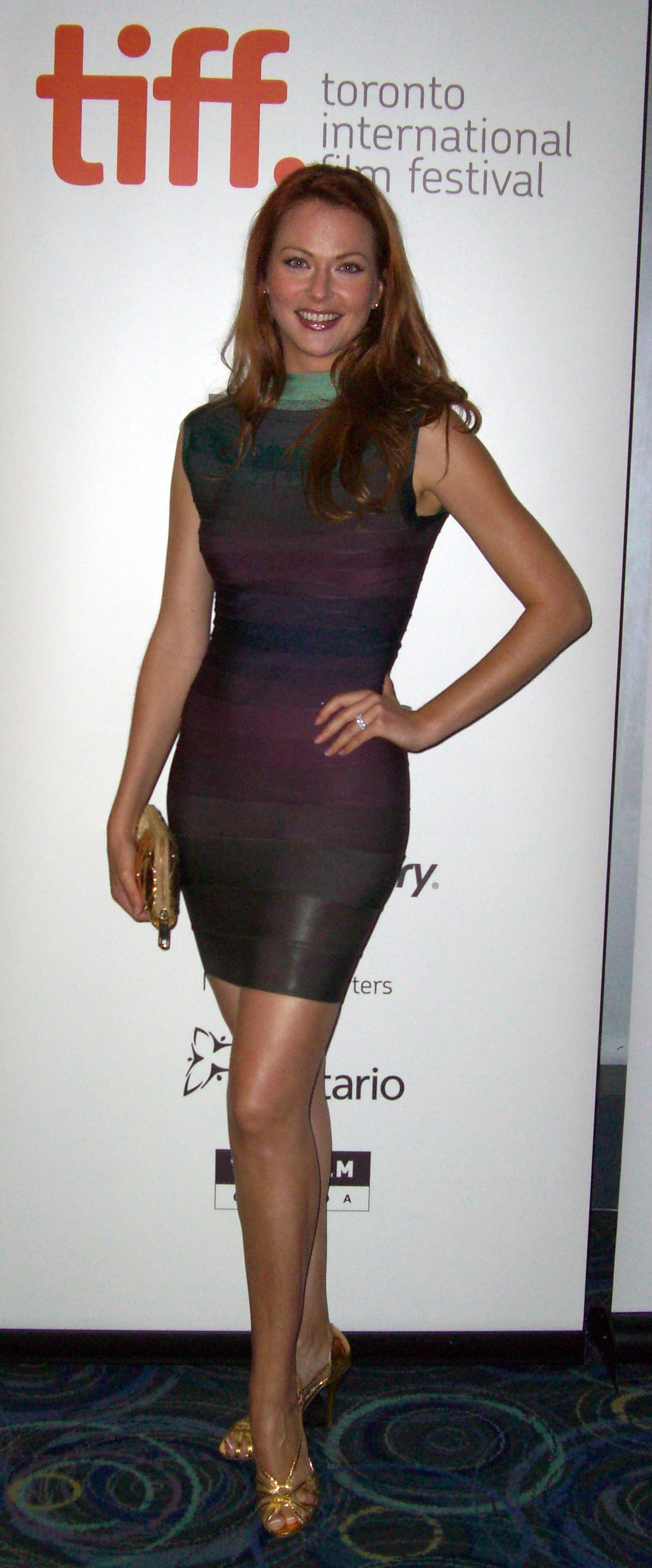
- At the 2009 Toronto International Film Festival.
- Born: Anna Katariina Shemeikka; 29 November 1976 (age 49); Tohmajärvi, Finland
- Occupations: Actress, model
- Website: www.annaeasteden.com

Anna Easteden (born 29 November 1976) is a Finnish-American actress. Her film appearances include The House of Branching Love (2009) and Sideways (2009). She is known for her performance as "Bee Sting" in Who Wants to Be a Superhero? season 2 (2007) on Sci Fi Channel. She co-starred in soap operas: Passions and Days of Our Lives on NBC, the television series Bones on Fox and Two and a Half Men on CBS.

== Biography ==
Easteden was born in Tohmajärvi, Finland, as Anna Katariina Shemeikka, the daughter of dairy farmers. She has a younger brother, Antti. Easteden was raised in Finland until her teenage years, excelling in public schools, and graduating youngest in her class.

=== Modeling career ===
Easteden graduated from a Finnish modeling school at the age of 12 and shortly booked her first modeling job in Finland. She appeared in her first magazine cover after winning a national contest held by popular teen magazine SinäMinä (as Anna Shemeikka).

Still a teenager, Anna Easteden received her first international modeling contract with a Japanese modeling agency and moved to Tokyo. In Tokyo she appeared in advertisements for companies such as: Kanebo, Sony, Nissan, Wacoal, Oricom, NEC and Lux. She was designer Akira Kimijima's house model and had an exclusive contract with a Japanese cosmetics company. Easteden also worked as a model in Hong Kong, Taiwan, Korea, Singapore, Malaysia, Indonesia, New Zealand, Slovakia, Guam and finally the United States. In the US, Anna Easteden has modeled for companies including: Avon, Salvatore Ferragamo, Calvin Klein, XOXO, Hermès, Diesel, Pony, T-Mobile, Toyo Tires, Michael Antonio, Jockey, Ashworth, Kohl's, Nissan, Victoria's Bridal, Gottschalks, Anna's Linens, PajamaGram, Rio Hotel, Marie Claire, Chevy, Sue Wong and Coffee Bean and Tea Leaf.

=== Acting career ===
Easteden started her acting career in TV commercials in Japan, Taiwan, and the United States. In her first play she was Sleeping Beauty in the play Sleeping Beauty, which premiered in Chicago, at the Downers Grove Tivoli Theatre.

Easteden is known for her performance as supervillain "Beesting" from Who Wants to Be a Superhero?. Her other television roles include: Two and a Half Men, Bones, Passions, and Days of Our Lives.

Easteden is the host of Wipeout in Finland, that started airing in Finland on FOX in March 2013.

=== Humanitarian Work ===
Easteden conducted a comparative legal research study on the different aspects of asylum procedures in selected European countries for United Nations High Commissioner for Refugees (UNHCR) in Bratislava, Slovakia. Her research impacted the Slovak National Asylum Legislation, which was in the process of amendment. Easteden continued her work in Bratislava, with an international partner of The Foundation for a Civil Society (USA), where she was involved in the "Citizen Campaign "OK '98" for free and fair elections.

== Personal life ==
Easteden married an American baseball coach, Rob McKinley, in 2007 and gave birth to their daughter Everett on February 23, 2018. They live in Los Angeles.

== Filmography ==
Year	Title	Role	Notes
2001	Inside Schwartz	Golf Date	Television series. Played as promos on NBC
2002	Law & Order	Poster Movie Star	Television series
2003	Let's Make a Deal	Finnish Actress	Television gameshow
2003	Days of Our Lives	Francoise	Television series
2004	Casting About	Herself	
2005	Happy Endings	Body Double Maimee	
2005	3 Wise Women	Dorothy Snapp	
2006	Bones	Polina Decker	Television series
2007	Who Wants to Be a Superhero?	Bee Sting	Television series
2007	John from Cincinnati	Beer Model Cutout	Television series
2007	You're So Dead	Robin DeBiggers	
2008	Passions	Julian's nurse	Television series
2009	The House of Branching Love	Nina	
2009	Sideways	Alli	Japanese film
2010	A Voice In The Dark	Harriet	
2010	Jimmy Kimmel Live!	Miranda from Sex and the City	Television series
2011	Two and a Half Men	Wanda	Television series
2011	Mann's World	France's Redhead	Television pilot
2011	Temazcal	Belle	
2012	Through the lens	Mother	Nikon D800 Official D-Movies

== Awards ==
In 2010, Easteden was nominated for Best Supporting Actress award at the Method Fest Independent Film Festival in Los Angeles, California.
