= The Archer (film) =

1982 Finnish drama film

- Finnish: Jousiampuja
- Directed by: Taavi Kassila
- Starring: Kari Heiskanen; Åke Lindman; Eeva Eloranta; Vesa Vierikko; Jarkko Rantanen; Pekka Laiho
- Release date: 1982
- Country: Finland
- Language: Finnish
- Budget: 1,001,750 mk

The Archer (Finnish: Jousiampuja) is a 1982 Finnish drama film directed by Taavi Kassila. The plot concerns a young drug dealer who is taken in and reformed by an old man who also teaches his archery.

== Cast ==
- Kari Heiskanen
- Åke Lindman
- Eeva Eloranta
- Vesa Vierikko
- Jarkko Rantanen
- Pekka Laiho
