= Rollo and the Spirit of the Woods =

2001 Finnish fantasy film by Olli Saarela

- Original Finnish film poster
- Directed by: Olli Saarela
- Screenplay by: Ilkka Matila; Olli Saarela
- Story by: Allu Tuppurainen
- Produced by: Ilkka Matila; Marko Röhr
- Starring: Allu Tuppurainen; Maria Järvenhelmi; Peter Franzén; Kari Hietalahti
- Cinematography: Pini Hellstedt
- Edited by: Jan-Olof Svarvar
- Music by: Tuomas Kantelinen
- Production company: Matila Röhr Productions
- Distributed by: Finnkino
- Release date: 21 December 2001 (Finland)
- Running time: 92 minutes
- Country: Finland
- Language: Finnish
- Budget: 12 million mk

Rollo and the Spirit of the Woods (also titled Rolli, Finnish: Rölli ja metsänhenki) is a 2001 Finnish fantasy film directed by Olli Saarela. It is the second film based on the television series Rölli, the first being Rölli – hirmuisia kertomuksia (1991).

A PC game of the same name based on the film was released in 2002.

== Plot ==
Hairy and rowdy trolls called rolleys sail to a land inhabited by more peace-loving elves. When the rolleys arrive to the elf village, they scare the elves away and settle down in the village. One of the elves, Milli, a brave elf girl, returns to the village to make a peace with the rolleys. The rolleys do not warm to Milli's peace proposal, but she becomes friends with a rolley called Rölli. It becomes their mission to solve the conflict between the elves and the rolleys.

== Cast ==
- Allu Tuppurainen as Rölli
- Maria Järvenhelmi as Milli Menninkäinen
- Peter Franzén as Lakeija
- Kari Hietalahti as Riitasointu
- Jussi Lampi as Iso
- Kalle Holmberg as Vaakamestari
- Samuli Edelmann as the elder of the elf village
- Jorma Tommila as the elder of the Rolley tribe

== See also ==
- Quest for a Heart – a 2007 animated Rölli film
