= Sideways (2009 film) =

2009 comedy-drama film by Cellin Gluck

- Theatrical release poster
- Kanji: サイドウェイズ
- Literal meaning: Sideways
- Directed by: Cellin Gluck
- Screenplay by: Uesugi Takayuki
- Story by: Alexander Payne; Jim Taylor
- Based on: Sideways (2004) Sideways (novel) by Rex Pickett
- Produced by: Chihiro Kameyama; Toru Miyazawa; Kazutoshi Wadakura
- Starring: Fumiyo Kohinata; Katsuhisa Namase; Kyôka Suzuki; Rinko Kikuchi
- Cinematography: Gary Waller
- Edited by: Jim Munro
- Music by: Jake Shimabukuro
- Production companies: Fuji TV; Cine Bazar; Protean Image Group
- Distributed by: 20th Century Fox Japan
- Release dates: September 27, 2009 (Wine Country Film Festival); October 31, 2009 (Japan)
- Running time: 123 minutes
- Countries: Japan; United States
- Languages: Japanese; English
- Budget: $3 million
- Box office: $1.5 million

Sideways (Japanese: サイドウェイズ, Hepburn: Saidoweizu) is a 2009 comedy-drama film directed by Cellin Gluck that is a remake of the 2004 Academy Award–nominated film Sideways. Unlike its predecessor that was set in the Santa Barbara wine country, it is primarily set in the Napa Valley wine region.

== Plot ==
Michio Saito is a middle-aged Japanese screenwriter with little success. He is a former foreign student who returns to California to attend the wedding of his best friend, Daisuke Uehara, to an Alli, an American. Uehara is a former actor who has lived in California since college and is now a restaurant manager. Before the wedding, the two men take one last bachelor trip to the Napa Valley wine country, where they meet a woman that Saito once tutored and admired, Mayuko Tanaka, and her barista friend, Mina Parker. Tanaka and Saito rekindle their acquaintance, and Parker and Uehara become romantically entangled.

== Cast ==
The actors include:

- Fumiyo Kohinata as Michio Saito
- Katsuhisa Namase as Daisuke Uehara
- Kyôka Suzuki as Mayuko Tanaka
- Rinko Kikuchi as Mina Parker
- Anna Easteden as Alli

== Critical reception ==
The Japan Times, "So, though Gluck's "Sideways" is predictable and tame compared to Payne's, its message of openness and tolerance is hard to fault. And if it lures more Japanese tourists to California, now an economic basket-case in desperate need of their yen, it is serving a useful purpose. I raise my glass to it — sideways."
