= Rolli: Amazing Tales =

- Original Finnish film poster
- Directed by: Olli Soinio
- Written by: Allu Tuppurainen; Olli Soinio
- Produced by: Marko Röhr; Asko Apajalahti
- Starring: Allu Tuppurainen; Sari Mällinen; Jussi Lampi; Rolf Labbart; Risto Kaskilahti; Harri Hyttinen
- Cinematography: Kari Sohlberg F.S.C.
- Edited by: Irma Taina
- Music by: Allu Tuppurainen
- Release date: 1991
- Running time: 82 minutes
- Country: Finland
- Language: Finnish

Rolli: Amazing Tales (Finnish: Rölli – hirmuisia kertomuksia) is a 1991 children's fantasy film. It stars Allu Tuppurainen, Sari Mällinen, Jussi Lampi, Rolf Labbart, Risto Kaskilahti and Harri Hyttinen.

The film was nominated for and won 3 Jussi Awards in 1992 including for Best Costume Design and Best Make-Up. Sari Mällinen also won Best Supporting Actress for her portrayal of Maahiskeiju.

It is the first feature-length film based on Rölli created by musician and actor Allu Tuppurainen, which first appeared as a children's show on YLE TV2. The film and TV show do not share similarities except for Rölli's attire and the film being set in the Rölli Forest. Suuri Rölli, a character featured in the Rölli audio-plays, appears portrayed by actor Jussi Lampi.

The songs for the film were composed by Allu Tuppurainen, as in the TV series.

== Plot ==
The film begins with Rölli going to look for some firewood. As he is about to chop an old tree, the tree begins to speak to him begging to instead collect the dead branches from the ground, promising that he'll repay the favour if he ever has the chance. All the while, Rölli is stalked by Big Rölli. He encounters a Forest Fairy (Maahiskeiju) and tries to scare her, but gets captured by Big Rölli instead. The Forest Fairy uses a log which the Big Rölli dragged with him to hit him on his foot to release Rölli. The two escape from Big Rölli and become friends.

Meanwhile, the owner of a toy company, Seesteinen (Risto Kaskilahti), and his butler Lerkkanen come to Rölli Forest to inspect it for the building of a new toy-factory. Rölli and the Forest Fairy try to scare them off by pretending to be a giant, but their plan fails and the humans give chance. They, however, run into Big Rölli and flee the forest in their jeep. However, the High Priest of the Kingdom of Evil (Rolf Labbart), has plans for the two humans. He causes the car to veer off the road and both Seesteinen and Lerkkanen are taken by the Priests lackeys, The Trashers, to their secret lair where they're brought before the Great Trash, a monstrous creature with the vague resemblance of a human head, which the Trashers worship. They are converted into Trashers and begin to plot the destruction of the Rölli Forest.

Seesteinen, pretending to be a good fairy god spirit, convinces Rölli that the sudden amounts of trash that have appeared all over the forest, confusing the residents and turning them on one another, are a good thing. He also leaves him a bottle of whisky telling it is a magic potion. Rölli becomes violently drunk and chases the Forest Fairy away. Disappointed at her own inability to stop the pollution in the forest she decides to leave but is captured by the Trashers.

Rölli regains his composure and realises that the other inhabitants of the forest are being fooled with an elaborate shopping mall like structure, where they dance to peppy music before being sucked down into the Trashers' lair and converted. Rölli tries to sneak in but is caught. At the lair he is reunited with Forest Fairy. At the same time Big Rölli stumbles upon the fake shopping mall and is also sucked down, but the Trashers are easily over-powered by him. He constantly grooms himself with a piece of a broom he got when the Forest Fairy hit him over the head with it earlier in the film. Brooms and brushes are the Trasher's and the Great Trash's only weakness and thus the Trashers try to get it. The agitated Big Rölli throws the brush at the Trashers and it bounces off their helmets into the mouth of the Great Trash. He begins to deflate and this causes the cave to collapse. The Trashers flee in horror and seem to regain their prior personalities.

Rölli and the Forest Fairy escape also, arriving at the very same tree that Rölli spared earlier in the film. The High Priest ambushes them and reveals his face which has begun to deteriorate due to his defeat. In a final effort he tries to kill Rölli and the Forest Fairy but the tree begins to scream, bewildering him. As his cape is stuck in a nook the tree falls on him killing him. Rolli and the Forest Fairy mourn for the tree for a while before sanguinely walking away.

== Name changes ==
Though the film doesn't have an official English release, the official DVD includes English subtitles with the following name changes.

- hirmuisia kertomuksia - Amazing Tales - The film's title originally translates as terrible/terrifying stories and is officially spelled without capital letters.
- Rölli - Rolli - The official name used for Rölli in the English language releases of the later films.
- Suuri Rölli - Big Rölli - A larger and dumber troll who is initially an antagonist and later a comic-relief character. He also reappears in the two later films. In his live action performances he is played by actor Jussi Lampi.
- Maahiskeiju - The Forest Fairy - While original name also contains the word Fairy (Keiju) the Maahis part comes from the word Maahinen (Brownie) and would be difficult to include in to the character's name.
- Yrjö Lerkkanen - George Larky - The name of the butler is changed to a more pronounceable form for English speakers. The name George is most often localized in Finnish media as Yrjö.
- Reino Seesteinen - Raymond Serene - The surname retains the original meaning of the Finnish name.
- Roskanheittäjät - Trashers - The original name of roskanheittäjät (literally "trash throwers") means litterbugs. In the television show they are referred to but intentionally never shown, obviously indicating that they are just people who litter.

== Soundtrack ==
The soundtrack was released the same year. Allan Tuppurainen was the voice for the Trasher's during the song Roskanheittäjien messu and his voice was also used for the Great Trash, albeit heavily altered to make him sound more menacing. The soundtrack features commentary with sound-effects by Rölli in a similar fashion to other Rölli audio tapes and CDs released around the time.

Timo Tervo performed Edullisesti itse kullekin which plays during the mall-dance sequence in the film. The songs were recorded at ML-studio and the soundtrack is distributed through VL-Musiikki OY.

=== Track listing ===
1. Olipa kerran
2. Mielikuvitusta vaan?
3. Röllin tavaralaulu
4. Maahiskeijun lähtölaulu
5. Ystäväni menettänyt oon
6. Edullisesti itse kullekin
7. Roskanheittäjien messu
8. Suuren roskan tuho
9. Me ollaan hänen lapsiaan

== Other movies ==
Ten years later Rölli would return in another live action movie, Rölli ja Metsänhenki, which is however unrelated to first film aside Tuppurainen and Jussi Lampi reprising their roles. A third movie, a feature-length animation, Röllin sydän (Quest for a Heart) was released in 2007 in which Tuppurainen voiced the animated Rölli.
