= Pertti Sveholm =

Finnish actor (born 1953)

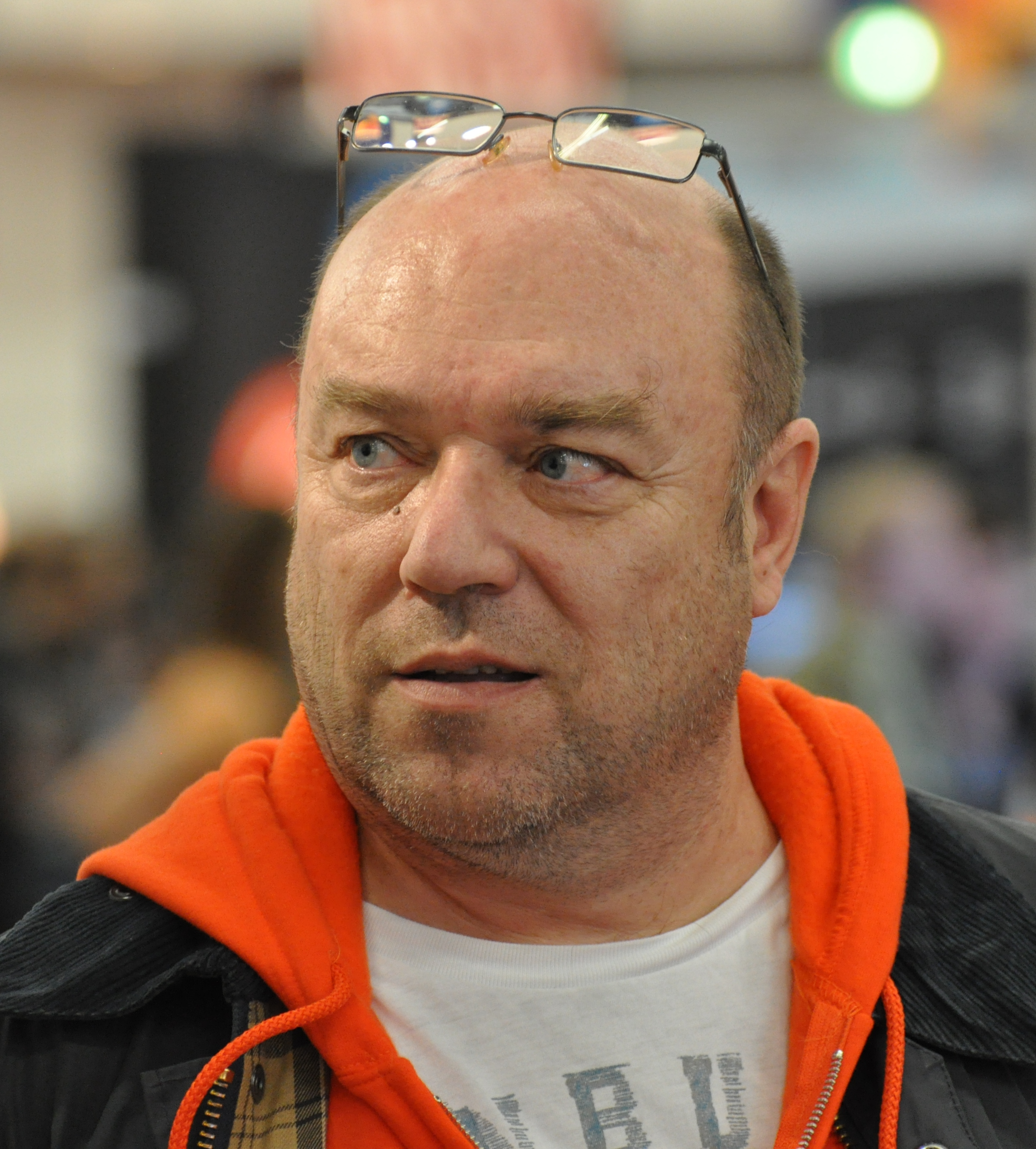
- Sveholm in 2011.
- Born: Pertti Edvin Sveholm; 2 December 1953 (age 72); Oulu, Finland
- Occupation: Actor

Pertti Edvin Sveholm (born 2 December 1953) is a Finnish actor. He has won the Jussi Awards for Best Supporting Actor in 2002 and 2009 for the films The Classic and The Home of Dark Butterflies.

Sveholm was married to actress Sari Havas from 1993 to 2007 and they have two children, Akseli Sveholm (born 1991) and Asta Sveholm (born 1994), both of whom are also actors.

== Selected filmography ==
=== Films ===
- Calamari Union (1985) as Frank
- The Winter War (1989) as Antti Jouppi
- Geography of Fear (2000) as Rainer Sakari Auvinen
- Restless (2000) as Pera
- True Love Waits (2000) as Puiston Pentti
- The Classic (2001) as Vikström
- The Man Without a Past (2002) as Police Detective
- Frozen Land (2005) as Pertti Smolander
- Promise (2005) as Helmer Moisio
- The Home of Dark Butterflies (2008) as Erik
- Three Wise Men (2008) as Matti
- The Interrogation (2009) as Arvo Tuominen
- Road North (2012) as Keke
- Heavy Trip (2018) as Bæjarstjórinn
- One Last Deal (2018) as Patu
- Reunion 3: Singles Cruise (2021) as Akseli
- Attack on Finland (2021) as Peter Nylund
- 100 Litres of Gold (2024) as Väinö Turpeinen
- The Kidnapping of a President (2026) as K. J. Ståhlberg

=== TV-series ===
- The Hobbits (1993) as Samwise Gamgee
- Lakeside Murders (2021) as Roine
- Estonia (2023) as Pasi Toukola
