= Adult Camp =

- Directed by: Johanna Vuoksenmaa
- Written by: Johanna Vuoksenmaa
- Produced by: Riina Hyytiä
- Cinematography: Jan Nyman
- Edited by: Antti Reikko
- Music by: Kerkko Koskinen
- Production company: Dionysos Films
- Release date: 23 January 2015
- Running time: 90 minutes
- Country: Finland
- Language: Finnish
- Budget: €1,500,000

Adult Camp (Finnish: Viikossa aikuiseksi) is a 2015 Finnish comedy film directed and written by Johanna Vuoksenmaa. The film follows ten different individuals and a cat spending a week at a "grown-up camp."

== Cast ==
- Minttu Mustakallio as Saara
- Taneli Mäkelä as Jouko
- Iina Kuustonen as Kaisa-Leena
- Jarkko Niemi as Petri
- Essi Hellén as Emma
- Jarkko Pajunen as Rane
- Lauri Tanskanen as Ville
- Anna-Leena Sipilä as Alli
- Minna Koskela as Mervi
- Eppu Salminen as Kalle
- Leoline Ragnar Rohkea IV as Mirri

== Reception ==
=== Box office ===
The film debuted as Finland's most-watched film during its opening weekend (January 23–25, 2015) with 25,771 viewers. It remained the top film in Finland during its second week. In February 2015, it surpassed 100,000 viewers.

=== Critical response ===
Episodi critic Jussi Huhtala gave the film three stars, praising its smooth narrative and natural acting but noting that it is not particularly funny for a comedy.

Helsingin Sanomat critic Pertti Avola rated the film two stars, describing it as a "forgettable functional comedy" with elements of slapstick and some unbelievable characters. Ilta-Sanomat reviewer Taneli Topelius also gave it two stars.

Iltalehti critic Tuomas Riskala called the film "uninteresting and like a bad sketch compilation," giving it one star. Similarly, Hufvudstadsbladet critic Krister Uggeldahl described it as "slapstick comedy and cheap summer theater."

Publication	Critic	Rating	Reference
Aamulehti	Antti Selkokari	3/5 stars	
Episodi	Jussi Huhtala	3/5 stars	
Helsingin Sanomat	Pertti Avola	2/5 stars	
Ilta-Sanomat	Taneli Topelius	2/5 stars	
Hufvudstadsbladet	Krister Uggeldahl	1/5 stars	
