= Tommi Eronen =

Finnish actor (born 1968)

- Born: Kuopio, Finland
- Years active: 1994–present

Tommi Johannes Eronen is a Finnish actor, best known for starring in the movies Jade Warrior (2006) and Bad Luck Love (2000).

== Early and personal life ==
Tommi Johannes Eronen was born in Kuopio, Finland.

He was married to actress Ria Kataja until 2012. Together they have two children. Eronen is a member of the Orthodox Church of Finland.

== Awards and nominations ==
Eronen's performance in Bad Luck Love garnered him a Jussi Award for Best Supporting Actor.

== Selected filmography ==
- Kesäyön unelma (1994)
- Rukajärven tie (1999)
- Bad Luck Love (2000)
- Onnenpeli 2001 (2001)
- Emmauksen tiellä (2001)
- Producing Adults (2004)
- Miehen sydän (2004)
- Jade Warrior (2006)
- Sauna (2008)
- The House of Branching Love (2009)
- Vares – Uhkapelimerkki (2012)
- Kalevala: The New Era (2013)
- Koukussa (2015)
- Memory of Water (2022)
- The Missile (2024)
- Queen of Fucking Everything (TV series, 2025)
