= Paavo the Great. Great Race. Great Dream. =

Paavo the Great. Great Race. Great Dream. (Finnish: Paavo Suuri. Suuri juoksu. Suuri uni.) is an opera in three acts by Finnish composer Tuomas Kantelinen to a libretto by the poet Paavo Haavikko. The opera deals with the life of the Finnish middle- and long-distance runner Paavo Nurmi who won a total of nine Olympic gold medals in the 1920s. It was premiered in the Helsinki Olympic Stadium in 2000 as Helsinki was one of the European Capitals of Culture. The title refers to Nurmi's great ambition to win the marathon race at the 1940 Helsinki Olympics, which were not held because of the outbreak of World War II.

== Performances ==
Paavo the Great. Great Race. Great Dream. was performed twice in the Helsinki Olympic Stadium in 11–12 August 2000. The original premier date was 10 August, but the first performance was cancelled in April due to the simultaneous Tina Turner concert in the nearby Finnair Stadium. The opera was produced by Helsinki City Theatre under the direction of Kalle Holmberg. Music was performed by Sinfonia Finlandia and the official representative band of the Finnish Army, Kaartin Soittokunta.

The spectacular open-air show included special effects like burning haystacks, a real army helicopter and armored vehicles. The opera was praised by the critics, but was not a box-office success as only 20 000 spectators appeared in two shows. The latter performance was filmed and broadcast live by the Finnish Broadcasting Company. In September it was sent throughout Europe by the Franco-German TV network Arte, preceding the opening of the 2000 Summer Olympics.

In the late 2003 the Paavo Nurmi Opera was performed in Turku by the Turku Opera Association and Turku Philharmonic Orchestra. The production turned out to be a financial disaster causing great losses for the opera association.

== Roles ==
The opera has four main characters; Paavo Nurmi, his spouse Sylvi Nurmi, the later president of Finland Urho Kekkonen and the mysterious "Dark Lady".

Role	Voice type	Premiere cast, 11 August 2000	The Turku production, 2003
Paavo Nurmi	baritone	Gabriel Suovanen	Hannu Niemelä
Sylvi Nurmi	soprano	Johanna Rusanen	Johanna Rusanen
Urho Kekkonen	tenor	Seppo Ruohonen	Seppo Ruohonen
The Dark Lady	mezzo-soprano	Eeva-Liisa Saarinen	Tamara Lund
