= Notkea Rotta =

Finnish rap group

Notkea Rotta is a Finnish rap group consisting of members Notkea Rotta, Rautaperse (Komisario Jyrkkä), Rohtori Laine and Meno-Anu. The group mixes humour and comedy in their brand of hip hop, crafting original (and largely fictional) rap saga of the underground culture in the east side of Helsinki. Notkea Rotta heavily parodies - or pays tribute to - American gangsta rap.

Notkea Rotta released their debut single "Pohinää" with Karelia Records.

Their lyrical subject matter mostly deals with common Finnish street drugs (especially amphetamine), sex and the occasional clashes with the police. The group raps exclusively in Finnish, using a lot of Helsinki slang vocabulary, making it rather difficult for non-speakers to understand the lyrics.

While the group had a band on stage at live acts for a longer time, on the last album the band was also in the studio for the recording of the 2007 album "Kontula - Koh Phangan All Night Long". The band is called "Liekehtivät Torsionit" (Flaming Torsions) and consists of musicians better known from bands like Barathrum, Ensiferum, L.A.M.F. and Defuse.

== Members ==
- Notkea Rotta (literally "Supple Rat")
- Rautaperse (literally "Iron Arse") / Komisario Jyrkkä (literally "Inspector Steep")
- Meno Anu (literally "Speedy-Anu") (real name Maria Järvenhelmi)
- Rohtori Laine

Liekehtivät Torsionit

The rhythm section of the band is called Liekehtivät Torsionit.

- Pannu Hanhi (Janne Parviainen) – drums
- Putsi T (Tero Karjalainen) – bass
- Rane Raitsikka (Harri Jäntti) – guitar
- Pajulaakso (Jyrki Pajunen) - producer

== Discography ==
=== Albums ===
- 2002: Panokset piippuun, pöhinät pönttöön
- 2005: Itä Meidän
- 2007: Kontula - Koh Phangan All Night Long
- 2012: Notkea Rotta

Notkea Rotta - solo

- 2010: Notkea maa

Rohtori Laine - solo

- TBA: Salkku ja mulkku

=== EPs ===
- 2004: Kaupungin vauhdissa EP

=== Singles ===
- 2001: "Pöhinää CDS"
