= Peter Franzén =

Finnish actor, author, screenwriter and director

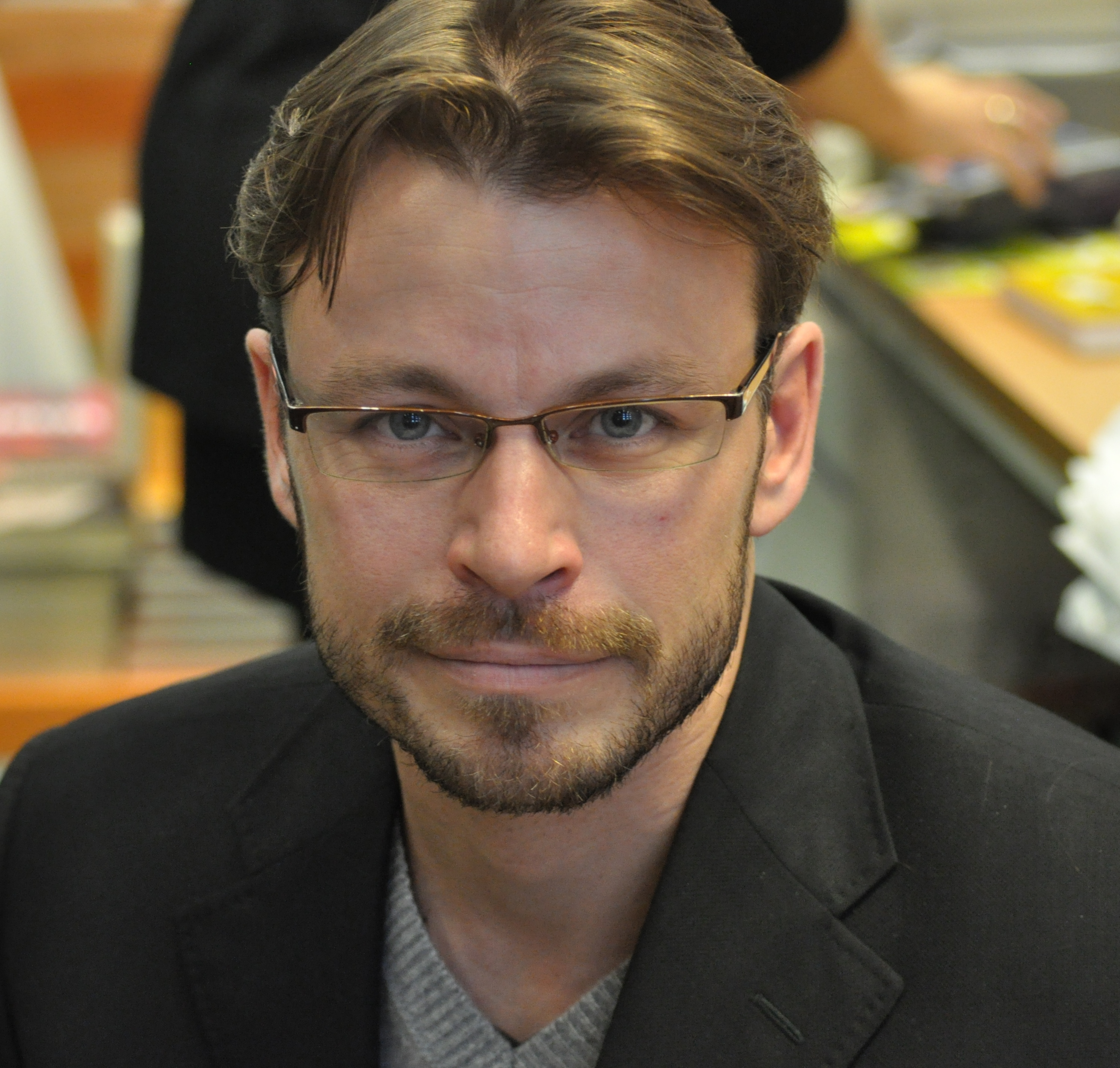
- Franzén in 2015
- Born: 14 August 1971 (age 55); Keminmaa, Lapland, Finland
- Education: Theatre Academy of Finland
- Occupation: Actor
- Years active: 1992–present
- Spouse: Irina Björklund
- Children: 1

Peter Vilhelm Franzén (born 14 August 1971) is a Finnish actor, author, screenwriter, and director. He is best known for his role as King Harald Finehair in Vikings (2016–2020).

== Personal life ==
Franzén grew up in Keminmaa, in Northern Finland. Franzén has described his childhood as difficult due to his violent and alcoholic stepfather. Later, Franzén's relationship to his abusive stepfather was a major focal point in his semi-autobiographical novel, Above Dark Waters. He met his actress wife Irina Björklund while studying in Theatre Academy of Finland. In 1999 the couple moved to Los Angeles, where they lived until 2013, after which they moved to France. They have a son, born in September 2007.

== Career ==
As an actor, Franzén has appeared in over 50 films and TV series. For his role in Dog Nail Clipper, Franzén was awarded a Jussi Award for Best Actor as well as earning praise from film critic Jay Weissberg from Variety magazine who called the actor "one of the most talented and versatile thesps in Finland".

In his career he has appeared in Finnish, Estonian, German, English, Swedish, and Hungarian speaking roles. In 2015, Franzén was cast as King Harald Fairhair from the fourth season of Vikings. Franzén has also been cast in Amazon Prime Video's The Wheel of Time TV series.

Peter Franzén in 2026.

== Filmography ==
=== Films ===
Year	Film	Role	Director	Notes
1994	Kissan kuolema – Death of a Cat	Saku	Raimo O. Niemi	
1996	Tie naisen sydämeen	Kauko	Pekka Parikka	
1998	A Summer by the River	Kottarainen	Markku Pölönen	Won — Jussi Award for best supporting actor
1998	Trains'n'Roses	Lako's lover	Peter Lichtefeld	
1999	Ambush	Lieutenant Eero Perkola	Olli Saarela	Nominated — Best Actor in Jussi Awards Won — Best Actor in Rouen Nordic Film Festival
1999	Rikos ja rakkaus	Jussi Rosenström	Pekka Milonoff	
2000	Badding	Ossi Mäki	Markku Pölönen	Franzén's second collaboration with Markku Pölönen
2000	Bad Luck Love	Reino	Olli Saarela	
2001	Drakarna över Helsingfors	Sammy Ceder	Peter Lindholm	
2001	Jewel of the Sahara	Young François Renoir	Ariel Vromen	Short
2001	Rollo and the Spirit of the Woods	Lakeija	Olli Saarela	
2001	On the Road to Emmaus	Mankka-Arvi	Markku Pölönen	Nominated — Best Supporting Actor in Jussi Awards
2002	Names in Marble	Sulo Kallio	Elmo Nüganen	
2002	Lovers & Leavers	Marko	Aku Louhimies	
2003	At Point Blank	Juha	Peter Lindmark	
2003	Bad Boys	Otto Takkunen	Aleksi Mäkelä	Franzén's first collaboration with Jasper Pääkkönen
2004	Dog Nail Clipper	Mertsi	Markku Pölönen	Won — Jussi Award for best actor
2004	Honey Baby	Waiter	Mika Kaurismäki	
2004	Hotet	Magnus	Kjell Sundvall	
2004	Popular Music	Voice-over	Reza Bagher	
2004	Täna öösel me ei maga	Harri	Ilmar Taska	
2006	Babas bilar	Pekka Kukka	Rafael Edholm	
2006	Matti: Hell Is for Heroes	Nick Nevada	Aleksi Mäkelä	Franzén's second collaboration with Aleksi Mäkelä
2006	Mystery of the Wolf	Antero Venesmaa	Raimo O. Niemi	
2007	The Matriarch	Laszlo	Markku Pölönen	
2008	Cleaner	Bronson	Renny Harlin	
2008	Three Wise Men	Santa Claus	Mika Kaurismäki	Franzén's second collaboration with Mika Kaurismäki
2009	Hellsinki	Krisu	Aleksi Mäkelä	Won — Jussi Award for best supporting actor
2009	Ralliraita	Suko	Markku Pölönen	
2010	Priest of Evil	Timo Harjunpää	Olli Saarela	Nominated — Best Actor in Jussi Awards
2010	Princess	Saastamoinen	Arto Halonen	
2011	Body of Water	Elias	Joona Tena	
2012	Road North	Pertti Paakku	Mika Kaurismäki	Nominated — Best Supporting Actor in Jussi Awards
2012	The Path of the Righteous Men	Taisto Raappana	Anders Engström	
2012	Purge	Hans Pekk	Antti Jokinen	
2013	Open Up to Me	Sami	Simo Halinen	Nominated — Best Actor in Jussi Awards
2013	Heart of a Lion	Teppo	Dome Karukoski	
2013	Above Dark Waters	Kake	Peter Franzén	Directorial debut
2015	The Gunman	Reiniger	Pierre Morel	
2015	Lapland Odyssey 2	Jorma	Teppo Airaksinen	
2015	Homecoming	Tomi	Mika Kaurismäki	
2015	Johan Falk 15: Blood Diamonds	Milo	Peter Lindmark	Straight to DVD
2015	Johan Falk 17: The End	Milo	Richard Holm	Straight to DVD
2016	The Mine	Raimo	Aleksi Salmenperä	
2018	Ashes in the Snow	General Komarov	Marius A. Markevicius	
2020	Meander	Adam	Mathieu Turi	
2021	Omerta 6/12		Aku Louhimies	
2021	Tale of the Sleeping Giants	Narrator	Marko Röhr	
2023	Boudica: The Queen of War	Wolfgar		
2023	The Abyss	Tage Vibenius	Richard Holm	

=== Television ===
Year	Title	Role	Notes
1996	Maigret	Leo Liikanen	1 episode Franzén's first collaboration with Irina Björklund
1999	The Wild Thornberrys	Guard (voice)	Episode: "On the Right Track"
2001	V.I.P.	Nazi	Episode: "Val's Big Bang"
2003	Irtiottoja		
2003	Madventures	Himself	Episode: "U.S.A. – California"
2004	CSI: Miami	Ivan Radu	Episode: "Legal"
2006	Studio Impossible	Various characters	
2007–2012	Karjalan kunnailla	Jake Rosenius	
2009	True Blood	Hrolf	Episode: "Never Let Me Go"
2016	Beck – Gunvald	Risto Kangas	1 episode
2016–2020	Vikings	King Harald Fairhair	Main role (seasons 4–6). Named Harald Finehair in the series.
2021	Love, Death & Robots	Snow	Episode: "Snow in the Desert"
2021	The Wheel of Time	Stepin	3 episodes
2022, 2024	Helsinki Syndrome	Elias Karo	14 episodes
2024	Twilight of the Gods	Glaumar (voice)	2 episodes
2024–2025	Conflict	Captain Rami Ohrankämmen	Miniseries; 6 episodes

=== Video Games ===
Year	Title	Role	Notes
2023	Alan Wake II	Ilmo Koskela/Jaakko Koskela	Voice and likeness

== Writing ==
In 2010 Franzén published a partly autobiographical novel Tumman veden päällä (Above Dark Waters).

In 2013 Franzén wrote Samoilla silmillä, a sequel to Tumman veden päällä.

In 2017 Tammi published Särkyneen pyörän karjatila, third book by Franzén.

== Directing ==
In 2013 Franzén directed the film "Above Dark Waters", based on novel he had written in 2010. In 2020, he directed and narrated a viking-themed short movie called "Age of Vikings: Fated" which was shot in Old Swedish.

== Singing ==
In 2021 Franzén sang the song Þat Mælti Mín Móðir (My Mother Told Me), that was performed by the Swedish band Hindarfjäll. The song first appeared in the TV-series Vikings where it was sung by Harald Fairhair (portrayed by Peter Franzén). Here Franzén reprises his performance, singing the song in the Old Norse language.

== Awards and honours ==
In 2013 Franzén was awarded the Pro Finlandia Medal of the Order of the Lion of Finland.
