= Pekka Lehtosaari =

Finnish director and screenwriter

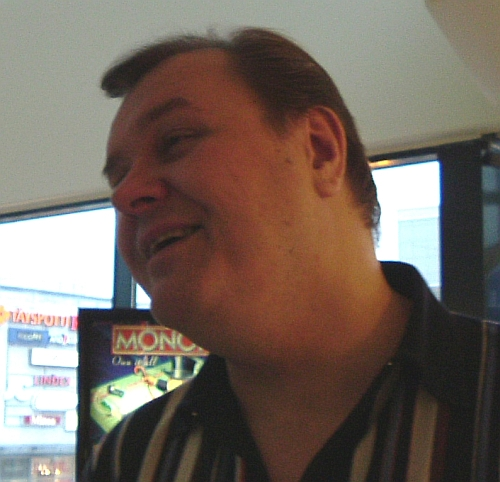
- Born: 10 February 1961 (age 65); Helsinki, Finland
- Occupations: Director, screenwriter, voice actor
- Years active: 1990–present

Pekka Lehtosaari (born 10 February 1961) is a Finnish film director and screenwriter. He is best known for directing Finnish-language dubbings of international films, starting with The Rescuers Down Under in 1990. He directed the Finnish dubbing of My Neighbor Totoro.

== Movies ==
- Santa Claus and the Magic Drum (1996), directing.
- Bad Boys (2003), screenwriting.
- Vares (2004), screenwriting.
- Quest for a Heart (2007), screenwriting, directing.
- Dark Floors (2008), screenwriting.
