= The Classic (2001 film) =

2001 film by Kari Väänänen

- Directed by: Kari Väänänen
- Screenplay by: Kari Väänänen
- Based on: Klassikko by Kari Hotakainen
- Produced by: Ilkka Mertsola
- Starring: Martti Suosalo; Janne Hyytiäinen; Matti Onnismaa; Pertti Sveholm; Pirkka-Pekka Petelius
- Cinematography: Timo Salminen
- Edited by: Timo Linnasalo
- Music by: Iiro Rantala
- Production company: Sputnik
- Distributed by: United International Pictures
- Release dates: 16 February 2001 (Berlin International Film Festival); 23 February 2001 (Finland)
- Country: Finland
- Language: Finnish
- Budget: 4 million mk

The Classic (Finnish: Klassikko) is a 2001 Finnish comedy film directed by Kari Väänänen. It is based on Kari Hotakainen's semi-autobiographical novel Klassikko. The film stars Martti Suosalo as writer Kari Hotakainen who receives an assignment from his publisher to write a confessional autobiographical novel.

Pertti Sveholm won the best supporting actor Jussi Award for his role as police lieutenant Vikström.

== Cast ==
- Martti Suosalo as Kari Hotakainen, a writer
- Janne Hyytiäinen as Pertti Olavi "Pera" Kiilopää
- Matti Onnismaa as Kartio, a car dealer
- Pertti Sveholm as Vikström, a police lieutenant
- Pirkka-Pekka Petelius as Veisterä, a publisher
- Arvi Lind as himself
- Susanna Roine as Tiia
