= Rölli =

Character from Finnish television

Rölli (sometimes called Rollo in English) is a character from Finnish television portrayed by Allan "Allu" Tuppurainen. The character originally appeared in segments on the children's TV show Pikku Kakkonen on YLE's Channel 2 in 1986. Original episodes were produced until 2001 and older episodes have been seen in constant reruns on the program. In these segments, Rölli would tell stories of his amazing adventures while often criticising and questioning public norm or the activities of people (especially humans).

Rölli has also appeared in five feature-length films. The first, made in 1991 and titled Rölli - hirmuisia kertomuksia ("Rölli - Terrible Stories") was much truer to the TV character, whereas the 2001 Rölli ja Metsänhenki ("Rölli and the Forest Spirit") was more of a traditional fantasy/adventure film. Rölli has appeared in an animated film Röllin sydän (Quest for a Heart) which appeared in Finnish movie theaters December 2007. This film was a co-production made in four countries. The latest films were called Rölli ja kultainen avain (2013) and Rölli ja kaikkien aikojen salaisuus (2016).

A notable feature of the show and later the movies are the many songs sung as a part of the story. Consequently, Rölli has been the basis of many successful children's cassettes and CDs.

== Character and series mythos ==
Despite popular belief, Rölli isn't really a troll. Allu Tuppurainen has said himself that he thought Rölli was part of this strange species which wasn't animal but not human either and that species is called Rölli. The reason why other röllis have "names" and main character Rölli is just Rölli is a mystery. (The common word rölli refers to the grass genus Agrostis, e.g. nurmirölli is common bent.)

Rölli lives in Röllimetsä ("Rölli Forest") which is home to many strange creatures. He prides himself on the fact that he never brushes his teeth or takes a bath. His popular catchphrase embodies his lack of personal hygiene: "Kautta likaisten varpaitteni!" ("By my dirty toes!"). While Rölli is very critical of humans he himself has been known to fall prey to their wonders and gadgets, and later regret it. He also likes to think of himself as a scary figure but comes off as silly.

In the beginning, the Rölli series did not have a very well organised mythos and Rölli would often claim to have met witches, ghosts, robots, giants and some such which would never actually appear on the show (some did appear in later audio plays).

Rölli is also very distrustful of fairies (menninkäiset) calling them a mischievous lot who like to play pranks on him, though a later encounter with a fairy in the TV show seemed to prove that Rölli was just being xenophobic. The depiction of fairies differs greatly between the series and the movies. In the series, fairies are depicted as small winged creatures that may appear as flashes of light amongst the trees during night. In the movie they seem to be fair earthy creatures and about the same size and height as trolls.

=== Other characters ===
- Suuri Rölli ("Big Rölli") is a well-known recurring character who is bigger, meaner and dumber than Rölli. He is popularly considered very dangerous as Rölli will often run away upon encountering him.
- Rölli Riitasointu (riitasointu = a dissonance) is a musically talented female rölli from whom Rölli used to take music lessons. Notably, however, in Rölli ja Metsänhenki Riitasointu is depicted as an effeminate man.
- Robotti Ruttunen, a robot that Rölli constructs, appears in the cassette plays. Robotti Ruttunen has personality characteristics reminiscent of humans with Asperger syndrome, and finds himself ostracized for this. In the song about him, Ruttunen eventually marries an old kitchen stove.
- Roskanheittäjät (Trash Throwers), a pun on the name commonly used for people who throw rubbish. Rölli considers them to be part of one evil entity, though originally they were not intended to be depicted like this. In the first movie they became actual characters, servants of an evil cult who served a bizarre blobbish creature called Suuri roska (Great Trash) and who were trying to destroy the Röllimetsä. Rölli stops them by throwing a toothbrush to the mouth of the trash deity, killing it, and is later saved by an old tree who kills the cult leader by falling on him.
- Rölli has also encountered a number of female characters who are potential love interests. These include Tiina Tonttu (elf/gnome/brownie), the fair Forest Maiden and also other characters from the Rölli movies like Maahiskeiju in Rölli Hirmuisia Kertomuksia ("Rölli Frightening Stories") and Milli Menninkäinen in Rölli ja Metsänhenki (Rollo and the Spirit of the Woods) and Röllin Sydän (Quest for a Heart).

== Satusuomalainen ==
On the 24th of August 2006, Rölli was voted the greatest Finnish fictional-character on the programme Satusuomalainen on YLE. In a live televote finale Rölli was up-against Uuno Turhapuro, Rokka from The Unknown Soldier and Little My from The Moomins. Rölli received well over a quarter of the votes, followed by Little My in second, Rokka in third and Uuno in fourth place.

Other characters who were part of the original eight contenders (from which the four most voted went into the finale) were Väinämöinen, Moomintroll, Captain Pirk of the Star Wreck film series and the comic strip characters Viivi and Wagner.

== Rölli Media ==
=== Television ===
- Original TV series 1986-1987, 1989-1990, 1993, 1997 and 2001

=== Movies ===
- Rölli - hirmuisia kertomuksia 1991
- Rölli ja metsänhenki 2001
- Röllin sydän 2007
- Rölli ja kultainen avain 2013
- Rölli ja kaikkien aikojen salaisuus 2016

=== Albums ===
Story albums:

- Tässä tulee Rölli - Rölli seikkailee 1 (1985)
- Röllimetsän syksyn sävel - Rölli seikkailee 2 (1985)
- Rölli ja kaverit - Rölli seikkailee 3 (1986)
- Rölli ja omituisten otusten kerho - Rölli seikkailee 4 (1987)
- Rölli ja Usvametsän neito - Rölli seikkailee 5 (1988)
- Rölli onnea etsimässä - Rölli seikkailee 6 (1990)
- Hirmuisia kertomuksia - Elokuvan laulut (1991); Despite the title, contains the plot of the movie as narrated by Rölli
- Rölli ja vajonnut kaupunki - Rölli seikkailee 7 (1992)
- Musiikkia elokuvasta Rölli ja metsänhenki (2001)
- Hirmuinen Rölli seikkailee (2002)

Song albums:

- Röllin laulut 1 -laulukokoelma (1986)
- Röllin laulut 2 -laulukokoelma (1987)
- Röllin laulut 3 -laulukokoelma (1993)
- Röllin suosituimmat laulut -laulukokoelma (1995)
- Röllin parhaat laulut -laulukokoelma (2000)
- 40 kaikkien aikojen Rölli-laulua -2CD laulukokoelma (2001)
