= Irina Björklund =

Finnish actress and singer

- Born: Irina Felicia Björklund; 7 February 1973 (age 53); Danderyd, Sweden
- Occupation: Actress
- Years active: 1994–present
- Spouse: Peter Franzén
- Children: 1

Irina Felicia Björklund (born 7 February 1973) is a Finnish actress and singer.

== Early life and education ==
Björklund was born in Danderyd, Stockholm County, Sweden before moving to Finland with her family. Björklund also lived in France during her early years.

She studied in the Theatre Academy of Finland from 1993 to 1996. She left the school when Svenska Teatern (Swedish theatre in Helsinki) hired her.

== Acting career ==
She acted in movies and in television series. Her well-known movies include Rukajärven tie (int. Ambush), Levottomat (int. Restless), Minä ja Morrison (int. Me and Morrison), and Vieraalla Maalla (int. Land of Love).

In September 2010, Björklund's career advanced when she landed a minor role in The American, starring George Clooney. She played the role of Clooney's lover, Ingrid.

=== Recognition ===
In 1999, she was awarded the Jussi Award for Best Leading Actress for her role as Milla in the movie Minä ja Morrison. Her breakthrough came in the movie Rukajärven tie, in which she played Lotta Kaarina Vainikainen. She was awarded the Shooting Star prize in the Berlin Film Festival in 2004.

== Music career ==
Björklund made a duet with Samuli Edelmann titled "Niin kaunis on maa". In 2011, she released her own music album in French with lyrics by Björklund and music by American Peter Fox. The album called Chanson d'automne did well in the Finnish Albums Chart reaching no. 21. In 2014, she released another French-language album, La vie est une fête with an even higher charting in Finland reaching no. 6.

== Personal life ==
Björklund is married to Finnish actor Peter Franzén. The couple moved to Los Angeles in 1999, where they lived until 2013, when they moved to France. The couple have a son, born in September 2007.

Björklund speaks fluent Finnish, Swedish, French and English, as well as some Russian and Spanish.

== Discography ==
Year	Album	Peak positions
Year	Album	FIN
2011	Chanson d'automne	21
2014	La vie est une fête	2
2015	Ce soir tout peut arriver...	19

== Filmography ==
- Ottaako sydämestä? (1995) (TV series)
- Tie naisen sydämeen (1996)
- Maigret Suomessa (1996)
- Svart, vitt, rött (1996)
- Ihanat naiset rannalla / Amazing Women by the Sea (1998)
- Vägsjälar (1998) (TV series)
- Asphalto (1998)
- Ambush (1999)
- Lapin kullan kimallus / Gold Fever in Lapland (1999)
- Jakkulista feministi (1999)
- Muodollisesti pätevä (1999) (TV series)
- Restless (2000)
- The Dummy (2000)
- Dirlandaa (2000) (TV series)
- Me and Morrison (2001)
- Yorick (2002)
- Talismanen (2002) (TV series)
- Vieraalla maalla / Land of Love (2003)
- Honey Baby (2003)
- The Third Wave (2003)
- Lost (2004)
- Red Is the Color of (2004)
- Trouble with Sex (2005)
- Red Lightning (2005)
- Perviy posle Boga (2005)
- Dustclouds (2007)
- Three Wise Men (2008)
- The Butcher (2009)
- The House of Branching Love (2009)
- The American (2010)
- Priest of Evil (2010)
- Cewek Gokil (2011)
- Road North (2012)
- The Eternal Road (2017)
- Le Café de Mes Souvenirs (2021)
- The Walking Dead: Daryl Dixon (2025)
