= Olli Saarela =

Finnish film director

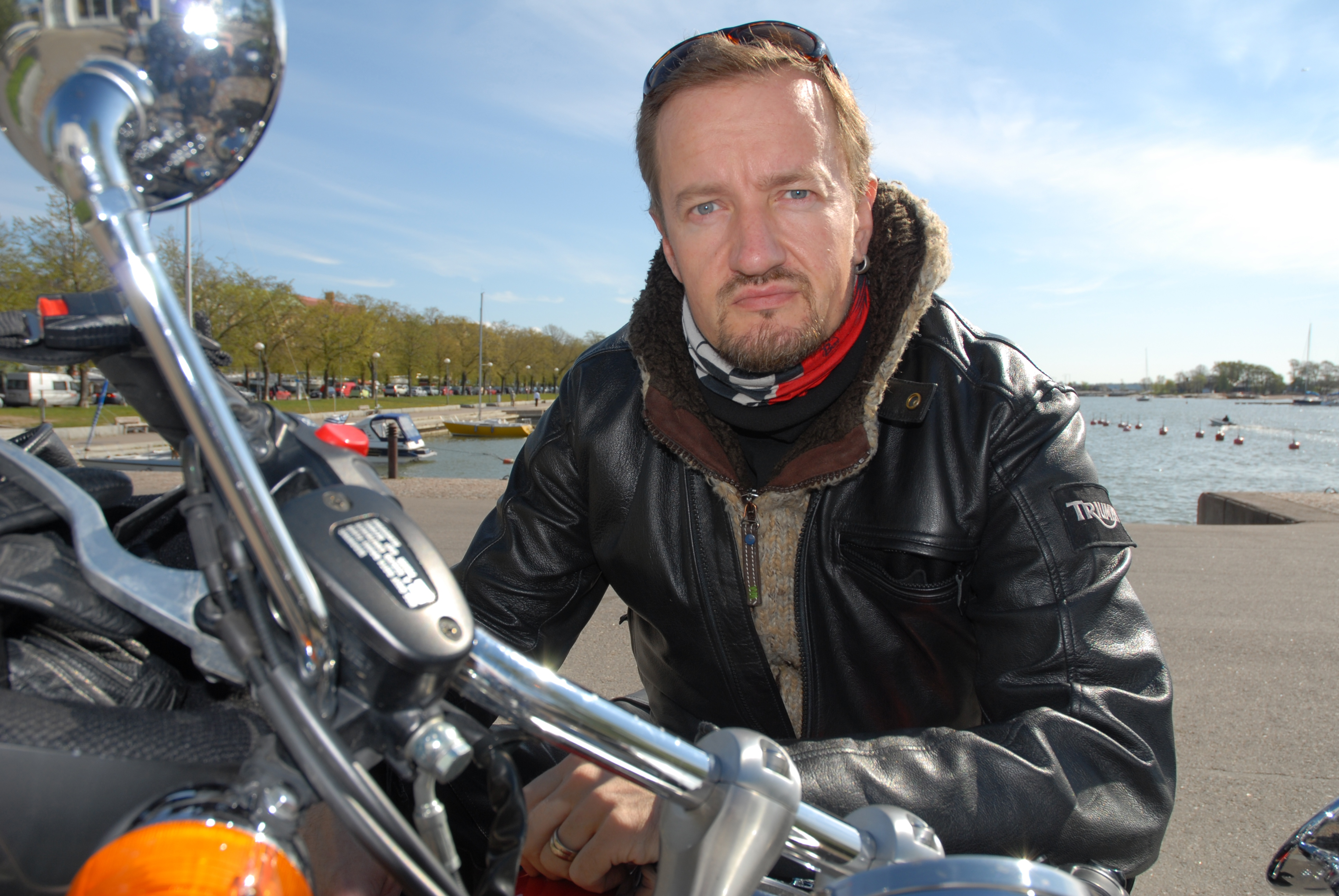
- Born: 16 March 1965 (age 61); Helsinki, Finland
- Occupations: Film director, screenwriter
- Years active: 1989–present
- Spouse: Tanja Karpela (m. 2006; div. 2008)

Olli Juhani Saarela (born 16 March 1965) is a Finnish film director. He has directed films such as Ambush, Bad Luck Love, Rollo and the Woods Sprite and Year of the Wolf, which is based on a book written by Virpi Hämeen-Anttila. Ambush was entered into the 21st Moscow International Film Festival.

== Family ==
On 21 May 2006 Saarela married Tanja Karpela (née Vienonen, 2006–2008 Saarela), who was then the Minister of Culture in Finland and was Miss Finland in 1991. Their marriage ended up in divorce in 2008.

Olli Saarela was in relationship with actress Jenni Banerjee after his marriage with Tanja Karpela. Banerjee and Saarela separated in early 2012. Now Olli Saarela is living with actress Jenny Rostain.

== Education and career ==
Before Saarela started studying to become a film director, he worked as a firefighter.

== Production company and soundtracks ==
MRP Matila Röhr Productions is the production company that has produced most of Saarela's films. Tuomas Kantelinen created the soundtracks to Saarela's films.

== The Heinäluoma incident ==
In August 2006, Saarela directly attacked Minister of Finance Eero Heinäluoma in an interview for Image Magazine, since, in his opinion, the Social Democratic Party of Finland that Heinäluoma heads had slandered his wife during budget negotiations. Minister of Culture Tanja Saarela ended up having to explain her husband's comments to the press and Olli Saarela later apologized for his rash comments.

That a grown man dares to. He's a miserable, big and bald-headed sissy. I would've punched him in the nose, the way he made himself look good was so outrageous.

— Olli Saarela in Image, 8/2006, p. 37

== Filmography ==
=== Full length features ===
- The Redemption (Lunastus, 1997)
- Ambush (Rukajärven tie, 1999)
- Bad Luck Love (2000)
- Rollo and the Woods Sprite (Rölli ja metsänhenki, 2001)
- The Year of the Wolf (Suden vuosi, 2007)
- Priest of Evil (Harjunpää & pahan pappi, 2010)

=== Short films ===
- Rotta (1989)
- Let Sleeping Animals Rest in Peace (Antakaa eläinten nukkua rauhassa, 1992)
- Juha Antti-Poika (1992)
- Julma maaseutu (1993)
- Ristin juurella (1997)
- Koverhar: Three Days from the Life of a Butcher (Koverhar: Lihanleikkaajan kolme päivää, 1998)
