= Freakin' Beautiful World =

- Original Finnish film poster
- Directed by: Jarmo Lampela
- Written by: Jarmo Lampela
- Produced by: Mika Ritalahti
- Starring: Joonas Bragge; Arttu Kapulainen; Pihla Penttinen; Ilkka Koivula; Kati Outinen
- Cinematography: Harri Räty
- Edited by: Kimmo Taavila
- Music by: Petri Nieminen
- Production company: Lasihelmi Filmi
- Distributed by: Finnkino
- Release date: 11 April 1997 (Finland)
- Running time: 96 minutes
- Country: Finland
- Language: Finnish

Freakin' Beautiful World (Finnish: Sairaan kaunis maailma) is a 1997 Finnish drama film written and directed by Jarmo Lampela. The film is about two teenage boys from Helsinki who owe money to a local drug dealer. In order to pay their debt, they have to travel to Stockholm to collect drugs for the drug dealer.

The film won Jussi Awards for Best Film, Best Cinematography, and Best Editing.

== Cast ==
- Joonas Bragge as Ismo, "Ippe"
- Arttu Kapulainen as Pauli, "Papu"
- Pihla Penttinen as Mia
- Ilkka Koivula as Kalevi "Kalle" Lahtinen
- Kati Outinen as Tarja, Ippe's mother
- Jyri Ojansivu as Sami, Papu's brother
- Pekka Valkeejärvi as Esa, Papu's father
- Sakari Korhonen as Sakke, Ippe's father
- Irja Matikainen as Anita, Mia's mother
