= Kari Heiskanen =

Finnish actor (born 1955)

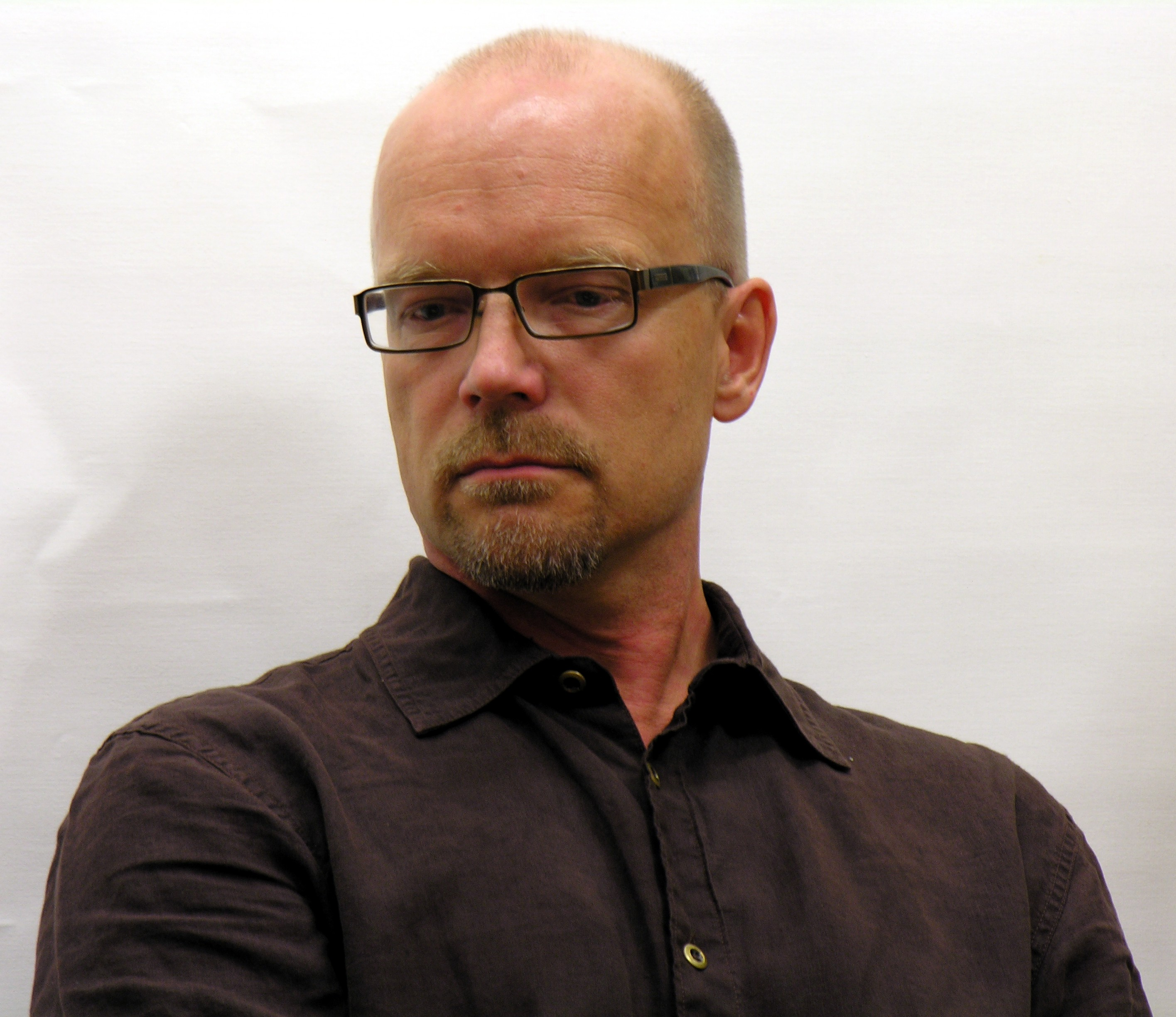
- Born: 16 March 1955 (age 71); Hämeenlinna, Finland
- Occupation: Actor
- Years active: 1978-present

Kari Heiskanen (born 16 March 1955) is a Finnish actor. He appeared in more than seventy films since 1978.

== Selected filmography ==
Year	Title	Role	Notes
1982	The Archer		
1985	Calamari Union		
1999	Ambush		
2007	The Year of the Wolf		
2008	Three Wise Men	Errki	
