= Bad Luck Love =

- Original Finnish film poster
- Directed by: Olli Saarela
- Written by: Olli Saarela; Heikki Vuento
- Produced by: Anna Heiskanen
- Starring: Jorma Tommila; Tommi Eronen; Maria Järvenhelmi
- Cinematography: Heikki Färm
- Edited by: Anne Lakanen
- Music by: Tuomas Kantelinen; Tuomas Toivonen
- Production company: Gnufilms
- Distributed by: Sandrew Metronome
- Release date: 29 September 2000 (Finland)
- Running time: 94 minutes
- Country: Finland
- Language: Finnish
- Budget: €550,000

Bad Luck Love is a 2000 Finnish crime drama film directed by Olli Saarela.

In 2001, the film won a total of four Jussi Awards: Best Direction, Best Male Supporting Actor (Tommi Eronen), Best Female Supporting Actor (Tarja-Tuulikki Tarsala) and Best Sound Design (Kyösti Väntänen).

== Cast ==
- Jorma Tommila as Ali
- Tommi Eronen as Pulu, Ali's brother
- Maria Järvenhelmi as Inka, Ali's girlfriend
- Ilkka Koivula as Alpi
- Kari Väänänen as Heinonen
- Elmeri Karlsson as Ville, Ali and Inka's son
- Rauno Juvonen as Naama
- Arttu Kapulainen as Vilkku
- Peter Franzén as Reino
- Petri Manninen as Mulko
- Tarja-Tuulikki Tarsala as Irja
