= On the Road to Emmaus =

2001 film by Markku Pölönen

- On the Road to Emmaus theatrical release poster (Finnish)
- Finnish: Emmauksen tiellä
- Directed by: Markku Pölönen
- Written by: Markku Pölönen
- Produced by: Kari Sara
- Starring: Puntti Valtonen; Peter Franzén; Lotta Lehtikari; Katariina Kaitue; Tommi Korpela; Sanna-Kaisa Palo
- Cinematography: Kari Sohlberg
- Edited by: Jukka Nykänen
- Music by: Vesa Mäkinen
- Distributed by: Buena Vista International
- Release date: 26 September 2001
- Running time: 80 minutes
- Country: Finland
- Language: Finnish
- Budget: FIM 1.6 million

On the Road to Emmaus (Finnish: Emmauksen tiellä) is a 2001 Finnish musical film written and directed by Markku Pölönen. With themes and title borrowed from Luke 24:13–27 of the New Testament, the film tells the story of Rane (Puntti Valtonen), a cynical real estate agent living in Helsinki, who returns to the small village where he was born in order to sell his family home. During his stay, as he's walking down the main road, he is forced to confront his past and realizes how selfish his life has been.

Sanna-Kaisa Palo won the 2002 Jussi Award for Best Supporting Actress while the film was nominated for an additional six Jussis including Best Film, Best Direction, Best Script, and Best Supporting Actor for Peter Franzén.

== Cast and characters ==
- Puntti Valtonen – Rane
- Peter Franzén – Mankka-Arvi
- Lotta Lehtikari – Rebekka
- Katariina Kaitue – Maikki
- Tommi Korpela – Kuoppala
- Sanna-Kaisa Palo – Ella

== See also ==
- 2001 in film
- Cinema of Finland
- List of Finnish films: 2000s
