= Ambush (1999 film) =

1999 Finnish film by Olli Saarela

- Theatrical release poster
- Finnish: Rukajärven tie
- Directed by: Olli Saarela
- Screenplay by: Olli Saarela; Antti Tuuri
- Based on: Novel by Antti Tuuri
- Produced by: Ilkka Matila; Jouni Mutanen; Marko Röhr
- Starring: Peter Franzén; Irina Björklund; Kari Heiskanen; Taisto Reimaluoto; Kari Väänänen; Tommi Eronen
- Cinematography: Kjell Lagerroos
- Edited by: Juha Antti-Poika; Jukka Nykänen; Olli Soinio
- Music by: Tuomas Kantelinen
- Production company: MRP Matila Röhr Productions Oy
- Distributed by: Finnkino
- Release date: 22 January 1999
- Running time: 123 minutes
- Country: Finland
- Language: Finnish
- Budget: 12,614,904 mk
- Box office: US$2.7 million (Finland)

Ambush (Finnish: Rukajärven tie; lit. 'Road of Rukajärvi') is a 1999 Finnish war film directed by Olli Saarela. The film debuted on 22 January 1999 in Finland, after which it was released internationally. The film is based on a book written by Antti Tuuri and its leads are played by Peter Franzén as Lt. Eero Perkola and Irina Björklund as Kaarina Vainikainen, Perkola's love.

Rukajärvi (Rugozero) is a municipality (as well as a lake) in Karelia, Russia, and it was held by the Finnish Army during the Continuation War of 1941–44.

== Cast ==
- Peter Franzén as Lieutenant Eero Perkola
- Irina Björklund as Lotta Kaarina Vainikainen
- Kari Heiskanen as Lance Corporal Jussi Lukkari
- Taisto Reimaluoto as Corporal Unto Saarinen
- Kari Väänänen as Corporal Tauno Snicker
- Tommi Eronen as Private Simo Karppinen
- Pekka Heikkinen as Corporal Evert Rönkkö
- Pekka Huotari as Private Martti Raassina
- Tero Jartti as Private Moilanen
- Rauno Juvonen as Private Hämäläinen

== Reception ==
The film opened at number one at the Finnish box office, replacing another Finnish film The Tough Ones, with a gross of $394,369 for the week. It went on to gross $2.7 million.

== Awards ==
The film won seven Jussi Awards in 2000 including Best Film, Best Direction, Best Photography, Best Edit, Best Staging, Best Sound Design and Best Score. The film was also entered into the 21st Moscow International Film Festival.

== See also ==
- Winter War
- The Winter War (film) – a film based on another Antti Tuuri novel about Finland's Winter War
