= Nousukausi =

2003 film

- Nousukausi DVD cover
- Directed by: Johanna Vuoksenmaa
- Written by: Mika Ripatti
- Produced by: Lasse Saarinen
- Starring: Petteri Summanen; Tiina Lymi; Kari-Pekka Toivonen
- Distributed by: FS Film
- Release date: 28 February 2003 (Finland)
- Running time: 98 min.
- Country: Finland
- Language: Finnish
- Budget: €1,087,000

Nousukausi, a.k.a. Upswing, is a 2003 Finland black comedy film. It is directed by Johanna Vuoksenmaa.

== Story overview ==
A well-to-do, young urban professional couple desires an unusual, cutting-edge vacation and seek the help of a travel agent from Invisible Hand Tours. The couple begin their vacation as unemployed slum-dwellers while their manipulative travel agent makes off with everything they own. When the couple realizes they have been duped, they race to track down the con as their lives spiral out of control.

== Plot ==
A dissatisfied yuppie couple in the IT business, with no kids and a fancy house in a prestige neighbourhood, have a few weeks off before the husband's new career challenges. Envious about their friends' exotic holiday destinations, the husband meets a travel agent at a party, offering the ultimate experience: a one-month vacation under a false identity in Jakomäki, a suburban block of flats in Helsinki. Part of the deal is that their credit cards, house keys, phones, passports, and custom automobile are all traded in for a run-down council-housing apartment and four envelopes each with a weekly cash, equal to a standard unemployment allowance. Acting as an unemployed couple, their street credibility is often questioned by their new neighbours who are more at home with the ways of the concrete jungle. However, they discover after the first week that the second envelope is empty, and that the travel agency where they purchased their extreme vacation, does not exist.
