= Jarmo Lampela =

Finnish film director

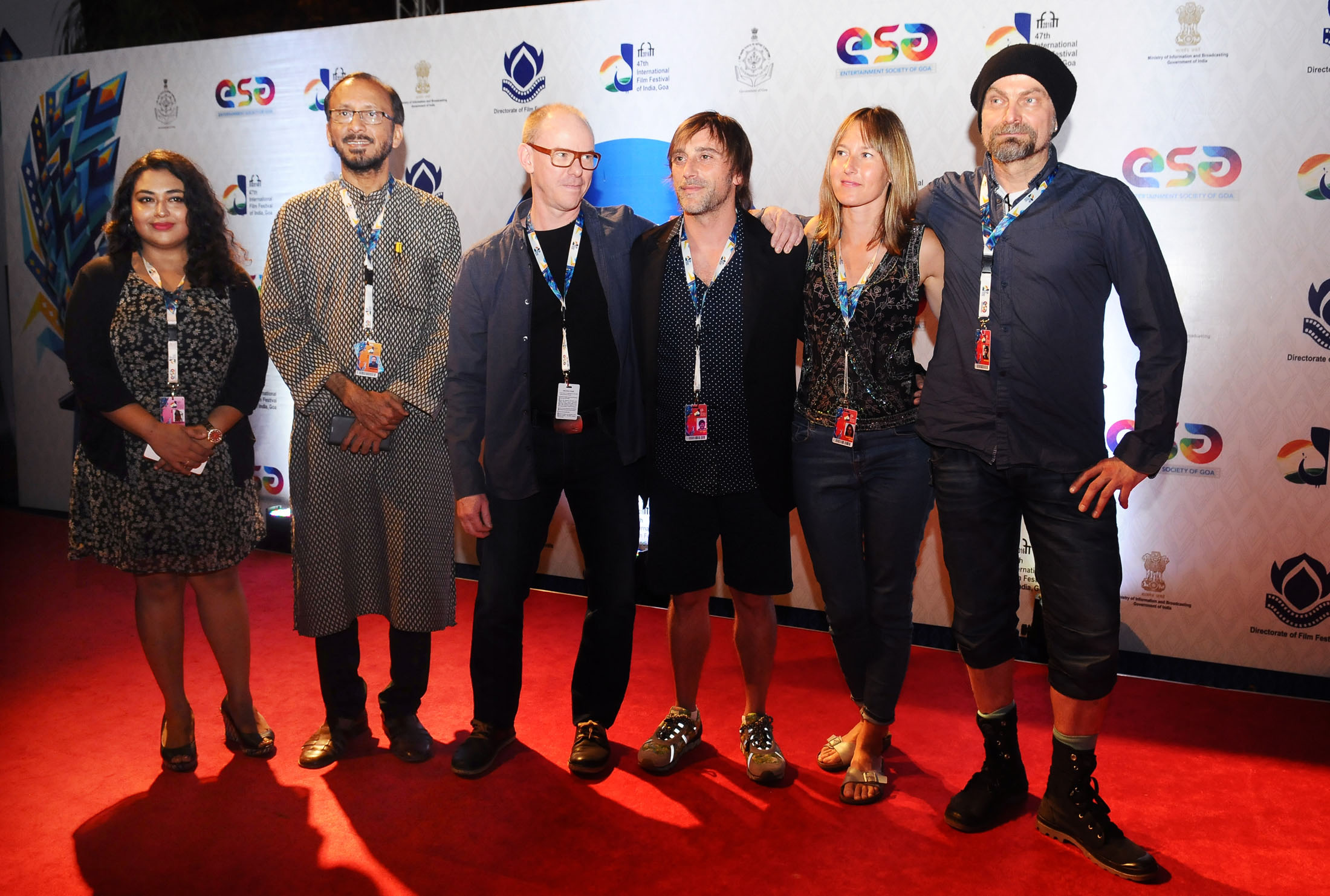
- Jarmo Lampela, IFFI (2016)
- Born: 9 October 1964 (age 61); Rovaniemi, Finland
- Occupations: Film director, screenwriter
- Years active: 1988–present

Jarmo Lampela (born 9 October 1964) is a Finnish film director and screenwriter. He has directed more than 15 films since 1988. His 2003 film Eila was entered into the 25th Moscow International Film Festival. In 2013 he is scheduled to direct a new film Werther.

== Selected filmography ==
- Freakin' Beautiful World (1997)
- The River (2001)
- Eila (2003)
