= Johanna Vuoksenmaa =

Finnish television and film director, screenwriter, photographer and artist

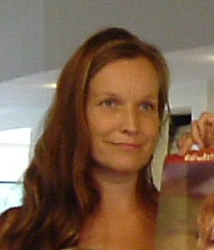
- Born: 21 September 1965 (age 60); Hämeenlinna, Finland
- Occupation(s): Film director, screenwriter
- Years active: 1989–present
- Spouse: Matti Rönkä

Johanna Vuoksenmaa (born 21 September 1965) is a Finnish television and film director and screenwriter who has also worked as a photographer, installation artist and a teacher. Her films have been shown at numerous film festivals around the world and she has won many Finnish film and television awards for directing and screenwriting. As a director and screenwriter, Vuoksenmaa prefers the comedy genre because to her comedy means relief, forgiveness and defense. She does not use casting agencies but prefers to cast actors to her films herself, since she thinks that it creates a level of trust between the actor and the director.

== Early life and education ==
Johanna Vuoksenmaa was born in Hämeenlinna on 21 September 1965. Her mother was a home economics teacher, her father a forestry technician and she also has an older brother, Jorma Vuoksenmaa, born in 1962. Originally she studied photography at the Institute of Design and Fine Arts at Lahti University of Applied Sciences from 1985 to 1989. In 1996 she decided to study scriptwriting and film directing at the School of Arts and Design in Helsinki, where she graduated as a director in 2001. During her time in the School of Arts and Design Vuoksenmaa did not like the pressure that the school put on its students by competing their works with others, she thought that it made the students play safe with their work to do well.

== Career ==
During her time at the Institute of Design and Fine Arts (1985-1989) she worked as a photographer for the Etelä-Suomen Sanomat newspaper and had a photography exhibition at Harju Gallery in Lahti, which was also shown in the Soviet Union. After graduating, she became a teacher of video and photography at the Tampere School of Art where she worked during the evenings and during the day she made art and worked as a successful installation artist for five years. Due to the birth of her two children she went on maternity leave and after she decided to change her career path because she felt that she wasn't reaching enough audience in the relatively small photography circles: "Even though I was pretty deep in the art world, I never thought I was making aesthetically pleasing things to be put up on walls. I created art to get reactions, to have a conversation with the viewer. I was aiming for interaction and communication but because the small audience of photography exhibitions was always just nodding in agreement, so I began to suspect a case of The Emperor's New Clothes." After graduating, she rose to fame in 2003 as a director with the feature film Nousukausi (Upswing) written by Mika Ripatti, which was awarded with the Finnish Jussi-award of the best film of 2004 and Vuoksenmaa was awarded with a certificate honour for her work as a director in the film at the Viitasaari Film Week. She has also worked on numerous television shows as a director and a screenwriter such as the popular comedy on MTV3 Kumman Kaa (2003) and Tahdon Asia (2005) among others. In recent years Vuoksenmaa has written and directed two seasons of the television series Klikkaa Mua (2011) which won five Venla-awards during its first season and its rights were sold to Sweden. She also directed and wrote the film 21 Ways to Ruin a Marriage (2013), which was the most watched domestic film in 2013, the most watched film directed by a woman in Finnish film history and won the Jussi-award for the people's choice film of 2013. In 2014 she wrote and directed the feature film Viikossa Aikuiseksi that premiered in the early 2015.

== Awards and nominations ==
Many of Vuoksenmaa's films have won and been nominated for numerous Finnish film and television awards. In 2008, Vuoksenmaa was part of the panel that chose the films that would be nominated for the Finnish Jussi-award, which is the highest Finnish award for film.

Year	Award	Film	
2003	Viitasaari Film Weeks certificate of honor for directing	Nousukausi (Upswing)	Won
2004	Jussi Award for Best Director	Nousukausi (Upswing)	Nominated
2007	Anjalankoski Film Award	Onni von Soppanen	Won
2011	Kultainen Venla Award for Best Screenplay	Klikkaa mua	Won
2014	Kultainen Venla Award for Best Director	Klikkaa mua	Nominated

== Filmography ==
Vuoksenmaa prefers to use comedy as a genre in her movies because it helps her to deal with her own misfortunes in life: "Positive, healing and integrative laughter usually comes from seeing the beauty in the ugliness of the story's character and recognizing yourself in it." Vuoksenmaa has said that the Danish Dogme 95 –movement has been a source of inspiration in some of her films, but she only wants to use the good sides of the movement. She does not like directing other people's screenplays, since it does not allow the freedom to change the script during filming.

Year	Film		
1997	Made in Filmland	Short documentary	Screenplay
1997	Omassa vuoteessa (Private Parts)	Short film	Director and screenplay
1999	Demokratia. Vitamiinit. Oppositio (Democracy. Vitamins. Opposition)	Short film	Screenplay
1999	Apinamies! (The Great Apes)	Short film	Director
1999	Rakastin epätoivoista naista (I Loved a Desperate Woman)	Feature film	Assistant director
2000	Taivas tiellä (True Love Waits)	Short film	Director and screenplay
2000	Kuningas hidas (Slow at Heart)	Feature film	Assistant director
2000	Paristo	Television series	Director and screenplay
2003	Kumman kaa	Television series	Director
2003	Nousukausi (Upswing)	Feature film	Director
2005	Tahdon asia	Television series	Director
2006	Onni von Soppanen	Feature film	Director
2007	Röyhkeä diplomaatti	Television series	Director
2007	Sydänjää	Television series	Screenplay
2008	Joku kaltaiseni	Television series	Director
2008	Ylikävely	Television series	Director
2009	Toinen jalka haudasta (One Foot Under)	Feature film	Director
2011	Klikkaa mua	Television series	Director and screenplay
2013	21 tapaa pilata avioliitto	Feature film	Director and screenplay
2015	Viikossa aikuiseksi (Adult Camp)	Feature film	Director and screenplay
2021	70 Is Just a Number	Feature Film	Director and screenplay
