= The River (2001 film) =

2001 Finnish film directed by Jarmo Lampela

- Original Finnish film poster
- Directed by: Jarmo Lampela
- Written by: Jarmo Lampela
- Produced by: Riikka Poulsen; Eila Werning
- Starring: Antti Ikkala; Jyri Ojansivu; Sanna Hietala
- Cinematography: Harri Räty
- Edited by: Kimmo Taavila
- Music by: Petri Nieminen
- Production company: Lasihelmi Filmi
- Distributed by: Sandrew Metronome Distribution Finland Oy
- Release date: 14 September 2001
- Running time: 104 minutes
- Country: Finland
- Language: Finnish

The River (Finnish: Joki) is a 2001 Finnish film directed by Jarmo Lampela. It is a story of the people of a small town faced with choices, when the events (six parallel stories) take place on an autumn Saturday morning. The film was Finland's submission to the 74th Academy Awards for the Academy Award for Best Foreign Language Film, but was not accepted as a nominee.

== See also ==
- Cinema of Finland
- List of submissions to the 74th Academy Awards for Best Foreign Language Film
