= Dog Nail Clipper =

- Dog Nail Clipper DVD cover (Finnish)
- Directed by: Markku Pölönen
- Written by: Veikko Huovinen (novel); Markku Pölönen (screenplay)
- Produced by: Kari Sara
- Starring: Peter Franzén; Taisto Reimaluoto; Ahti Kuoppala; Ville Virtanen; Risto Salmi
- Cinematography: Kari Sohlberg
- Edited by: Jukka Nykänen
- Music by: Vesa Mäkinen
- Distributed by: Buena Vista International
- Release date: 31 January 2004
- Running time: 105 minutes
- Country: Finland
- Language: Finnish
- Budget: €1,300,000
- Box office: €1,431,971

Dog Nail Clipper (Finnish: Koirankynnen leikkaaja) is a 2004 Finnish film directed by Markku Pölönen and starring Peter Franzén and Taisto Reimaluoto. The film is an adaptation of Finnish author Veikko Huovinen's 1980 novel of the same name.

In spite of low profits, the film was critically acclaimed receiving positive reviews and winning several major film awards. Dog Nail Clipper was the most successful film at the 2005 Jussi Awards winning in five categories including Best Film, Best Actor, and Best Direction.

== Plot ==
Mertsi (Peter Franzén) is an intelligent young Finnish soldier fighting against the Soviet Union in World War II. During a battle in 1941, Mertsi is shot in the head and sustains substantial brain damage that leaves him unable to cope with the demands of a normal life. Two of his friends, Eetvi (Taisto Reimaluoto) and Ville (Ahti Kuoppala), try to help him by getting him employed at their places of work so that they can keep an eye on him. But both jobs — construction with Ville and logging with Eetvi — prove to be beyond Mertsi's current ability. Ville tells Mertsi about his dog back home and speaks warmly about his companionship and his concern for the dog's well-being due to the overly long claws. Mertsi decides to travel to Ville's village and take care of the dog by clipping his nails. Due to Mertsi's inability to take care of himself, his trip to the village and his stay with the dog are marked by the kindness and compassion of complete strangers who help Mertsi in his quest to make himself feel like a useful and needed member of the society.

== Cast and characters ==
- Peter Franzén — Mertsi Arhippa Vepsäläinen
- Taisto Reimaluoto — Eetvi Manninen
- Ahti Kuoppala — Ville Kuosmanen
- Ville Virtanen — Foreman Luti
- Risto Salmi — Turpeinen

== Reception ==
=== Critical response ===
The film was a success with critics, receiving mostly positive reviews and winning several major film awards. Jay Weissberg of Variety called the film "Markku Polonen's most mature work to date" and citing, among other things, "Peter Franzen's standout performance" as reason behind film's success. In a separate review in 2008, Weissberg referred to Dog Nail Clipper as "emotionally satisfying but quirky". Weissberg also offered his opinion that the title of the film gives a false impression of the film's thematic subject and that it "may hamper international sales". Film critic Rich Cline called the film "emotionally resonant and relevant" concluding that "it's a simple, moving film".

=== Awards ===
==== Won ====
- Rouen Nordic Film Festival (2004)
  - Audience Award
- Hamburg Film Festival (2004)
  - Audience Award
- Jussi Awards (2005)
  - Best Film
  - Best Direction — Markku Pölönen
  - Best Actor — Peter Franzén
  - Best Script — Markku Pölönen
  - Best Cinematography — Kari Sohlberg
- Anjalankoski Film Sunday (2005)
  - Anjalankoski Film Prize — Markku Pölönen

==== Nominated ====
- Jussi Awards (2005)
  - Best Set Design — Minna Santakari (lost to Jussi Halonen, Samuli Halla, and Petri Neuvonen for Pelicanman)
