= Foreign workers in the Soviet Union =

Between 1917 and 1939, approximately 70,000 to 80,000 foreign workers, specialists, and political exiles lived and worked in Soviet Russia. At its peak in mid-1932, 42,230 foreign workers were employed in Soviet industry, mostly men and mostly skilled laborers. Of those, 50% were German or Austrian, 25% were American, and the rest were Finnish, Czech, Italian, French, Spanish, Swedish, and Japanese workers.

The main timeline of foreign workers in the Soviet Union can be divided roughly into two periods, the 1920s and the 1930s.

== 1920s ==
Between 1920 and 1922 about 10,000 Russian-Americans who had earlier emigrated from the United States made their way back to the Soviet Union, either voluntarily or through deportation by American authorities. Most were unskilled laborers who returned to the countryside to work in agriculture.

Western workers also began emigrating to Russia. By the end of 1921, at least 500 Germans and a few hundred other foreigners were employed in Soviet factories. A permanent commission on foreign immigration was formed under the STO (Sovet Truda I Oboroni), which received approximately 420,000 requests for admission between 1922 and 1925. It allowed 5,503 individuals in the country, mostly as agricultural workers.

Most individuals who were interested in living and working in Soviet Russia were involved in socialist or communist parties in their own countries, and had connections to workers’ parties or labor rights movements. Some fled their home countries due to their experiences of racism, hoping that Soviet Russia would provide a better environment for racial equality than their homelands. Some radical western women also came to the Soviet Union in the 1920s, curious about a country that claimed to have achieved gender equality. Immigrants sought employment in the Soviet Union for a multitude of reasons, and weren't necessarily motivated by politics.

In industry, the two largest groups of foreigners were in the Kuzbass Autonomous Industrial Colony (AIK) with 566 foreigners and the Interguelpo cooperative with 360 foreigners, mostly Czechs. At the end of 1929 fewer than 5,000 foreign workers remained in the country due to new restrictions on admission and foreigners’ decisions to return home. The commission on foreign immigration was dissolved in 1929.

== 1930s ==
In 1930, the Sixteenth Party Congress resolved to admit foreign engineers, foremen, and skilled workers in order to staff Soviet plants in connection with the five-year plan, setting a ceiling of 40,000 foreign workers and specialists. Subsequently, thousands of foreign workers and specialists were recruited from countries struggling with high unemployment in order to teach Soviet workers modern techniques of industry. The Amtorg Trading Corporation, the Soviet Union’s trade representation in the United States, announced it had received more than 100,000 applications for immigration in 8 months in 1931. The socialist newspaper Die Rote Fahne reported more than a million Western workers had requested to go to Russia in that same year. Hundreds of specialists in a range of fields were recruited by Soviet programs in contracts for one, two, or three year periods. However, due to the high demand and the priorities of the five-year plan, only very skilled workers, specialists, or people with instruments or machinery were allowed in.

By early 1931 there were 10,000 foreigners employed in Soviet industry. By its peak in mid-1932, 42,230 foreign workers were employed in Soviet industry, mostly men and mostly skilled laborers. Of those, 50% were German or Austrian, 25% were American, and the rest were Finnish, Czech, Italian, French, Spanish, Swedish, and Japanese workers. As opposed to the 1920s, where most were employed in agriculture, now most were employed in industry, particularly in heavy industry or major projects like Magnitogorsk or Kuznetsk where in 1931 they accounted for 2 or 3 percent of the workforce. In most places they staffed key technical positions.

The 1930s were marked by a series of foreign workers’ strikes in the Soviet Union. Workers protested poor living conditions and withholding of wages.

After the economic crisis of 1933, the Soviet government discontinued payment to foreigners in hard currency, and the population of foreign workers declined to less than 20,000. The late 1930s saw the arrest of over 10,000 foreign workers, who were subsequently either deported or sent to the gulags. After the signing of the Molotov–Ribbentrop pact in August 1939, hundreds of German foreign workers were deported to Nazi Germany. The arrests of the late 1930s coupled with a mass exodus of foreign workers back to their home countries practically wiped out the foreign worker population going into the 1940s.

== Conditions ==
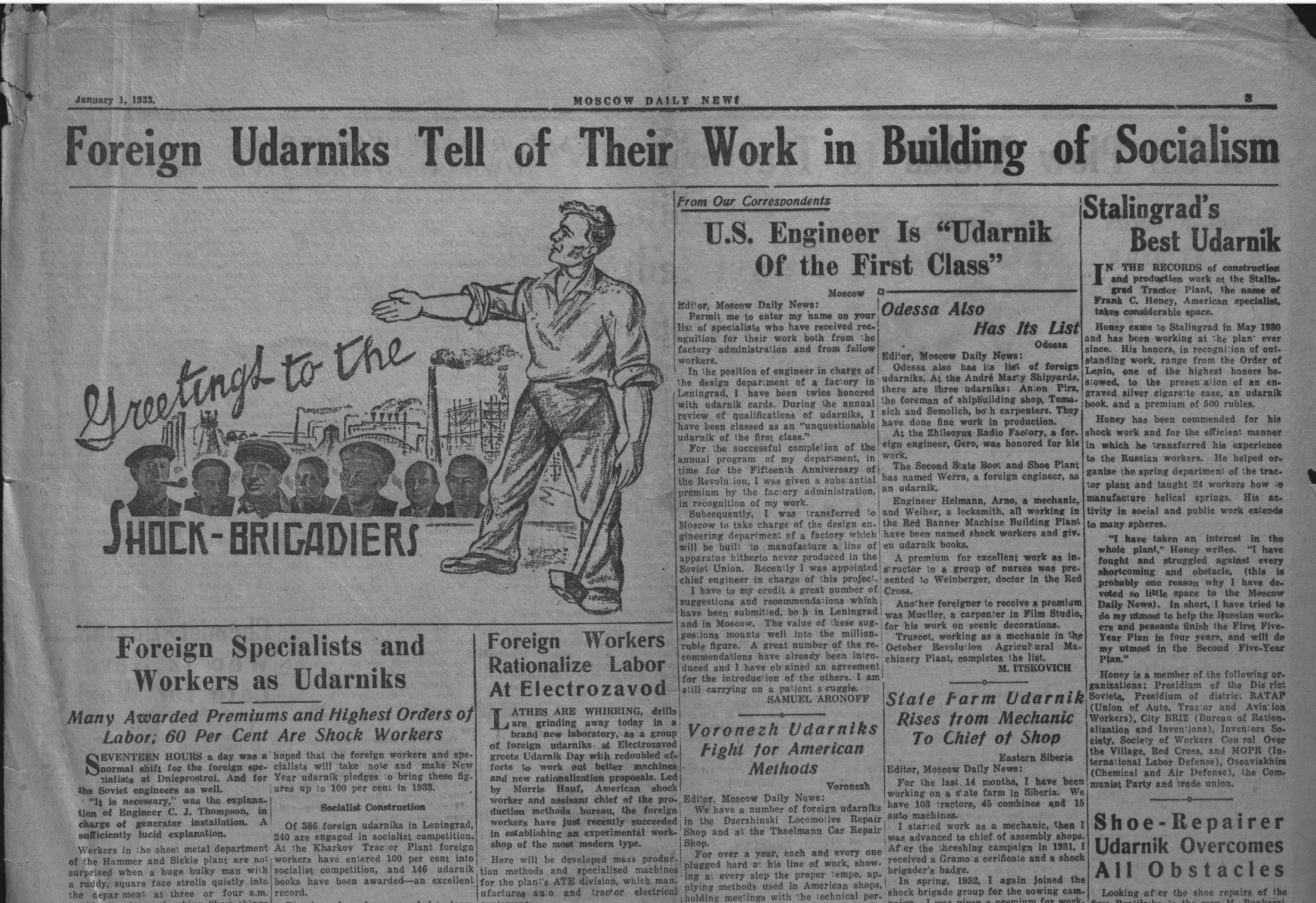
Articles about foreign udarniki in the Moscow Daily News

Most foreign and skilled workers enjoyed special privileges, as a result of the high value placed on skilled labor. Foreign workers were often given better housing accommodations than the local workers and received wages often 8 to 10 times higher than native workers. Soviet officials established schools that taught in English or German for the children of foreign workers, and foreign workers had their own newspapers such as the Moscow Daily Times, and a Foreign Workers Bookshop was established in Moscow to provide reading material in languages such as English and German for education and entertainment.

88 percent of foreign workers were trade union members, and 40 percent participated regularly in production meeting. 60 percent of foreign specialists and workers were shock workers (udarniki). Foreign udarniki were also eligible for recognition and awards. Several foreigners were awarded the Order of Lenin, including Americans George MacDowell and Frank Honey.

== See also ==
- Industrial Workers of the World
- Kuzbass Autonomous Industrial Colony
- New Economic Policy
