= The Land of Happiness =

- Original Finnish film poster
- Directed by: Markku Pölönen
- Screenplay by: Markku Pölönen
- Produced by: Kari Sara
- Cinematography: Kari Sohlberg
- Edited by: Jukka Nykänen
- Production company: Dada-Filmi Oy
- Release date: 30 April 1993
- Running time: 60 minutes
- Country: Finland
- Language: Finnish

The Land of Happiness (Finnish: Onnen maa) is a 1993 Finnish comedy-drama film, set in the 1960s (when tango was all the rage in Finland), by multiple award-winning Finnish director Markku Pölönen.

== Plot ==
The film stars Finnish actor Pertti Koivula in the lead role as Tenho, a prodigal son with patent leather shoes and dancing skills to match, who returns home to his family's rural farm for the summer after failing to make a living in the city. Tenho's brother Aarne (Taisto Reimaluoto) runs the farm while Grandma ("Mummo") (Anja Pohjola), the boys' mother, as the matriarch, tends to farm chores while caring for her boys' father (Veikko Tiitinen) in his failing physical and mental health. Other characters include Tenho's young nephew Tapi and Tenho's sister-in-law Tuija.

Tenho is immediately put to work on the farm by his brother, but Tenho is not cut out for farm life. He cannot keep up with the work even when he tries, and he does everything possible to get out of helping, even deliberately maiming himself.

Highlights of the film include Tenho's budding romance with the attractive milk maid Virva; it looks like a sure thing until Virva learns about a certain bet involving her that Tenho has made with Aarne. That's when Virva turns to ice and Tenho's feelings change to crazed obsession.

The film also features live performances by Finnish tango musician Reijo Taipale.

== Cast ==
- Katariina Kaitue as Virva
- Pertti Koivula as Tenho Hirvola
- Anja Pohjola as Mummo
- Veikko Tiitinen as Ukki
- Tuula Väänänen as Terttu Anneli Hirvola
- Taisto Reimaluoto as Aarne Tapio Hirvola
- Riikka Räsänen as Tangotyttö
- Tatu Kaihua as Tapani 'Tapi' Ilmari Hirvola
- Heidi Hakkarainen as Tuija
- Reijo Taipale as Tangokuningas
- Carl Mesterton as Saarnamies
- Jukka Puronlahti as Välkky
- Leo Raivio as Hännystelijä
- Esa Halonen as Meijerimies

== Development and history ==
The Land of Happiness was Markku Pölönen's first film to be released theatrically. It was funded by the Finnish Film Foundation, the Finnish Broadcasting Company, MTV3 and AVEK's Sparrausrinki project.

In theaters, the film received just under 15,000 viewers, but the first television screening in 1993 was seen by more than a million Finns. The 1995 TV remake received about 700 thousand viewers, and the 1998 remake more than 800 thousand viewers.

== Awards ==
The film won the best picture and best screenwriter awards for Pölönen at the 1994 Finnish Jussi Awards, Finland's premier movie accolade.
