= Markku Pölönen =

Finnish film director and screenwriter

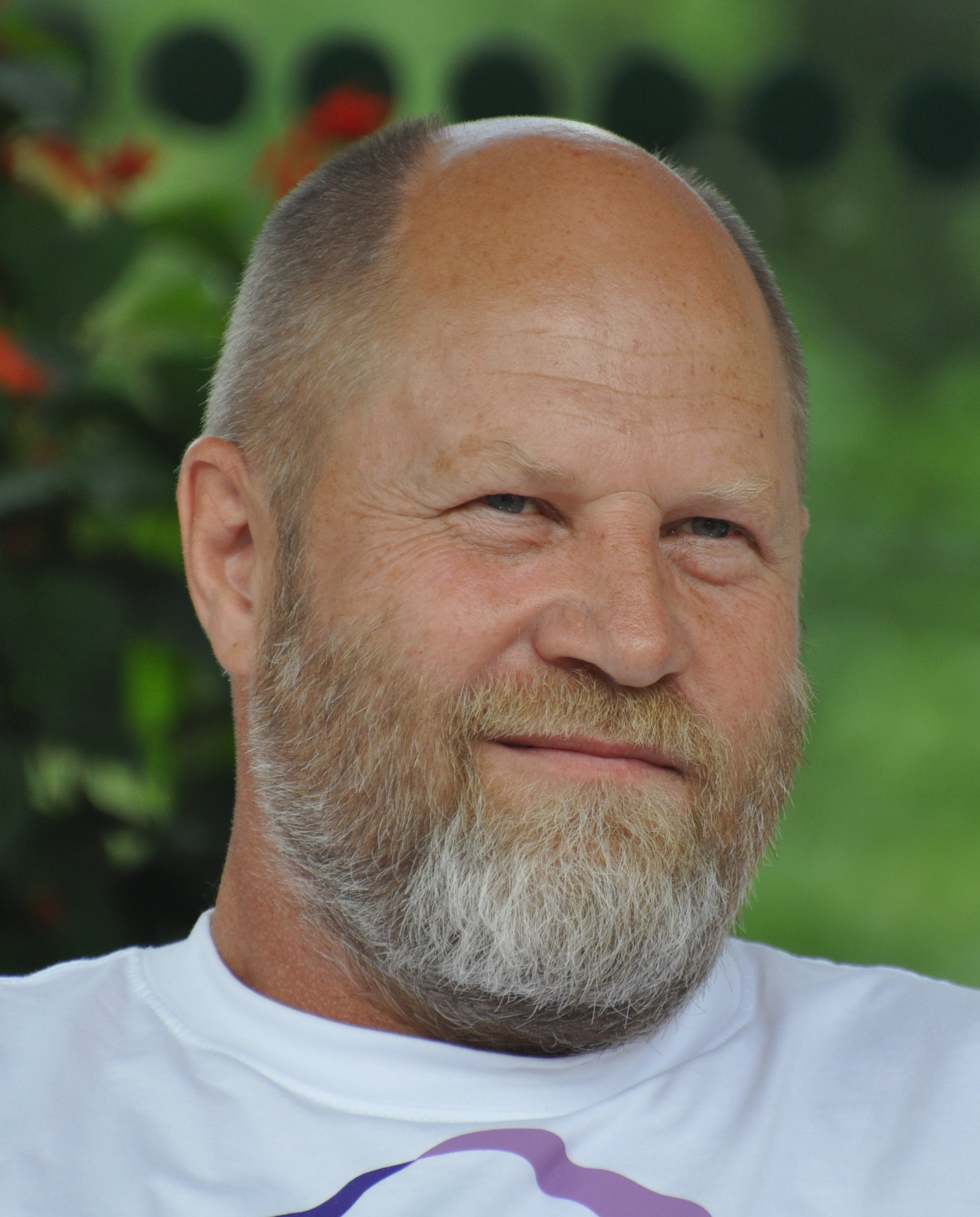
- Markku Pölönen in July 2012.
- Born: 16 September 1957 (age 68); Eno, Finland
- Occupations: director, screenwriter, editor, film production company owner

Markku Tapani Pölönen (born 16 September 1957 in Eno) is a Finnish film director, screenwriter, and editor; and the owner of film production company Suomen Filmiteollisuus. Pölönen's best known work is the 2004 film Dog Nail Clipper — written and directed by Pölönen — which was honoured in five categories at the 2005 Jussi Awards (Finland's premier film awards) including Best Direction and Best Script and which film critic Jay Weissberg from Variety called Pölönen's "most mature work to date". Pölönen has received numerous additional Jussi awards, including best picture and best screenplay for Onnen Maa (1994); best picture and best director for Kivenpyörittäjän kylä (1995); and best picture, best director, and best screenplay for A Summer by the River (1999) Pölönen has also been nominated for two other Jussis that he did not win. Finally, many of Pölönen's films have earned best actor and best actress awards, as well.

== Personal life ==
In Mervi Juusola's book "Levottomat aivot" (Restless Brains), Pölönen stated that he has mild Asperger syndrome.

== Select filmography ==
Year	Film	Credit
1993	Onnen Maa (Land of Happiness)	Director, writer
1995	Kivenpyörittäjän kylä	Director, writer
1998	A Summer by the River	Director, writer
2000	Badding	Director, writer
2001	On the Road to Emmaus	Director, writer
2004	Dog Nail Clipper	Director, screenwriter
2007	The Matriarch	Director, writer, editor
2009	Rally On!	Director, writer, editor
