= Maria Järvenhelmi =

Finnish actress and singer (born 1975)

- Born: 14 June 1975 (age 50); Finland
- Occupations: Actress, singer
- Years active: 1990-present

Maria Järvenhelmi (born 14 June 1975) is a Finnish actress and singer. She has appeared in 27 films and television shows since 1990. She starred in the film Lights in the Dusk, which was entered into the 2006 Cannes Film Festival. Järvenhelmi is also part of the Finnish band Notkea Rotta where she is known by her stage name Meno-Anu.

== Selected filmography ==
- Taivas tiellä (2000)
- Bad Luck Love (2000)
- Rollo and the Spirit of the Woods (2001)
- Rölli ja metsänhenki (2001)
- Lights in the Dusk (2006)
- The House of Branching Love (2009)
- The Kiss of Evil (2011)
- The Role (2013)
