= Tuomas Kantelinen =

Finnish composer

Tuomas Kantelinen (born 22 September 1969) is a Finnish composer. He was born in Kankaanpää and studied composition at the Sibelius Academy with Eero Hämeenniemi. He is best known for his scores for films such as Rukajärven tie, Äideistä parhain, Mindhunters and Mongol. He has also composed the opera Paavo the Great. Great Race. Great Dream, chamber music and orchestral works as well as music for television shows and commercials.

== Partial filmography ==
- Ambush (Rukajärven tie, 1999)
- Bad Luck Love (2000)
- Rollo and the Spirit of the Woods (Rölli ja metsänhenki, 2001)
- Me and Morrison (Minä ja Morrison, 2001)
- The Life of Aleksis Kivi (Aleksis Kiven elämä, 2002)
- Without My Daughter (Ilman tytärtäni, 2002)
- Mindhunters (2004)
- Mother of Mine (Äideistä parhain, 2005)
- Matti: Hell Is for Heroes (Matti, 2006)
- Mongol (2007)
- Quest for a Heart (2007)
- Arn – The Knight Templar (Arn – Tempelriddaren, 2007)
- Arn – The Kingdom at Road's End (Arn – Riket vid vägens slut, 2008)
- Skeleton Crew (2009)
- The Italian Key (2011)
- The Legend of Hercules (2014)
- The Icebreaker (2016)
- The Knocking (2022)
- Quiet Life (2024)
- Altered (2024)
- 100 Days (2026 film) (2026)
