= Tanssii tähtien kanssa =

Finnish television dance contest

- Presented by: Vappu Pimiä (2009–2011, 2013–2025); Mikko Leppilampi (2010–2021); Tuija Pehkonen (2017–); Marco Bjurström (2006–2009); Ella Kanninen (2006–2007, 2012); Vanessa Kurri (2008); Ernest Lawson (2022-)
- Judges: Jukka Haapalainen (2006–); Jorma Uotinen (2006–); Helena Ahti-Hallberg (2008–2013, 2017–); Kiira Korpi (2017); Krisse Salminen (2014); Jenni Pääskysaari (2013); Riku Nieminen (2012); Anna Abreu (2011); Jone Nikula (2010); Susanna Rahkamo (2009); Johanna Rusanen (2008); Merja Satulehto (2006–2007); Mikko Rasila (2006–2007)
- No. of seasons: 12
- No. of episodes: 116

Production
- Camera setup: Multi-camera
- Running time: 1–2 hours

Original release
- Network: MTV3
- Release: 5 March 2006

Related
- Vappu tähtien kanssa, Tuija tähtien kanssa, Tanssikupla

Tanssii tähtien kanssa (Dancing with the Stars) is a Finnish version of the British reality TV competition Strictly Come Dancing and is part of the Dancing with the Stars franchise. The show has run on MTV3 since 3 March 2006, on Sunday evenings. The twelfth season was aired in the autumn 2019.

The show was originally hosted by Marco Bjurström and Ella Kanninen. Ella Kanninen left the show after the second season and was replaced by model and Season 2 contestant Vanessa Kurri. In 2009, Kurri was replaced by Vappu Pimiä after only one season. Marco Bjurstöm left the series after Season 4 and Mikko Leppilampi took over as host. Ella Kanninen returned to host the seventh season due to Pimiä's maternity leave; Pimiä returned to host the eighth season with Leppilampi.

A talk show Vappu tähtien kanssa (Vappu with the Stars) was broadcast during the fifth season of the main show. Based on Strictly Come Dancing: It Takes Two, it is a companion show to Tanssii tähtien kanssa. It aired during the run of the main show on MTV3 and was hosted by Vappu Pimiä, who also hosted the main show at the time.

The series' title is a pun on the title of the film Dances with Wolves, Tanssii susien kanssa.

== Cast ==
=== Presenters ===
Presenters	Role	Seasons										
Presenters	Role	1	2	3	4	5	6	7	8	9	14	15
Marco Bjurström	Host	♦	♦	♦	♦							
Ella Kanninen	Hostess	♦	♦					♦				
Vanessa Kurri	Hostess		♦	♦								
Vappu Pimiä	Hostess			♦	♦	♦	♦		♦	♦	♦	♦
Mikko Leppilampi	Host					♦	♦	♦	♦	♦	♦	
Ernest Lawson	Host										♦	♦

Full time presenter
Competed as a contestant before being a presenter

=== Judges ===
Judges	Role	Seasons								
Judges	Role	1	2	3	4	5	6	7	8	9
Jukka Haapalainen	Judge (seasons 1–2); Head Judge (seasons 3–9)	♦	♦	♦	♦	♦	♦	♦	♦	♦
Jorma Uotinen	Judge	♦	♦	♦	♦	♦	♦	♦	♦	♦
Mikko Rasila	Judge	♦	♦							
Merja Satulehto	Head Judge	♦	♦							
Helena Ahti-Hallberg	Judge	♦	♦	♦	♦	♦	♦	♦	♦	
Johanna Rusanen	Judge			♦						
Susanna Rahkamo	Judge				♦					
Jone Nikula	Judge	♦				♦				
Anna Abreu	Judge						♦			
Riku Nieminen	Judge							♦		
Jenni Pääskysaari	Judge								♦	
Krisse Salminen	Judge							♦		♦

Full time judge
Competed as a contestant before being a judge

== Professional partners ==
Color key:

Winner
Runner-up
3rd place
Celebrity partner was eliminated first for the season
Celebrity partner withdrew from the competition

Professional dancer	Season								
Professional dancer	1	2	3	4	5	6	7	8	9
Mikko Ahti		Sari Siikander	Maria Lund				Baba Lybeck	Sari Havas	
Helena Ahti-Hallberg	Keith Armstrong	Jani Sievinen							
Saana Akiola					Jukka Rasila	Jukka Tammi			
Vesa Anttila		Pirkko Arstila		Miia Nuutila					
Anna-Liisa Bergström					Antti Tuisku	Jarppi Leppälä		Mert Otsamo	
Sanna Hirvaskari	Tomi Metsäketo	Sami Sarjula			Juha Veijonen				
Susa Matson			Nicke Lignell	Wilson Kirwa	Jethro Rostedt	Veeti Kallio	Risto Kaskilahti	Juhani Tamminen	Kaj Kunnas
Anna Sainila		Eppu Salminen	Jimi Pääkallo					Sami Hedberg	
Willi Gabalier							Brigitte Kren	Marjan Shaki	
Vadim Garbuzov						Alfons Haider	Petra Frey	Susanna Hirschler	Roxanne Rapp
Elke Gehrsitz		Hans Georg Heinke							
Alice Guschelbauer			Michael Tschuggnall	Hans Kreuzmayr	Gerhard Zadrobilek	Markus Wolfahrt			
Florian Gschaider						Alexandra Meissnitzer	Sueli Menezes	Monika Salzer	
Michaela Heintzinger	Toni Polster	Gregor Bloéb	Harry Prünster	Peter Tichatschek	Ramesh Nair				
Andy Kainz	Marika Lichter	Gerda Rogers	Stephanie Graf	Elke Winkens	Claudia Reiterer				
Babsi Koitz-Baumann					Udo Wenders	Uwe Kröger	Marco Ventre	Rudi Roubinek	
Thomas Kraml							Eva Maria Marold	Angelika Ahrens	Andrea Buday
Alexander Kreissl	Patricia Kaiser	Simone Stelzer	Hera Lind	Claudia Stöckl	Sandra Pires				
Nicole Kuntner		Edi Finger	Michael Konsel	Dorian Steidl	Andy Lee Lang				
Kathrin Menzinger						Dieter Chmelar	David Heissig	Lukas Perman	Hubert Neuper
Lenka Pohoralek							Albert Fortell	Gregor Glanz	Erik Schinegger
Julia Polai	Peter Rapp	Andreas Goldberger	Peter L. Eppinger	Oliver Stamm	Christoph Fälbl	Mike Galeli			
Christoph Santner						Cathy Zimmermann	Katerina Jacob	Katharina Gutensohn	Andrea Puschl
Maria Santner							Michael Schönborn	Biko Botowamungu	Marco Angelini
Manuela Stöckl								Rainer Schönfelder	
Roswitha Wieland						James Cottriall	Frank Schinkels	Gerald Pichowetz	Daniel Serafin
Alexander Zaglmaier		Barbara Karlich	Zabine Kapfinger	Elisabeth Engstler	Marie-Christine Friedrich				
Manfred Zehender	Barbara Rett	Ulrike Beimpold	Timna Brauer	Christine Reiler	Tini Kainrath				

== Seasons ==
=== Series overview ===
Season	# of Stars	# of Episodes	Season Premiere Date	Season Finale Date	Celebrity Honor Places		
Season	# of Stars	# of Episodes	Season Premiere Date	Season Finale Date	Winner	Runner-Up	Third Place
1 – Spring 2006	8	8	5 March 2006	23 April 2006	Tomi Metsäketo	Kristiina Elstelä	Jone Nikula
2 – Spring 2007	8	9	25 February 2007	22 April 2007	Mariko Pajalahti	Sari Siikander	Sami Sarjula
3 – Spring 2008	10	12	2 March 2008	18 May 2008	Maria Lund	Nicke Lignell	Tuuli Matinsalo
4 – Spring 2009	10	12	1 March 2009	17 May 2009	Satu Tuomisto	Pirkko Mannola	Rosa Meriläinen
5 – Autumn 2010	10	12	19 September 2010	5 December 2010	Antti Tuisku	Laura Voutilainen	Jukka Rasila
6 – Autumn 2011	10	12	25 September 2011	11 December 2011	Viivi Pumpanen	Jarppi Leppälä	Jani Toivola
7 – Autumn 2012	10	12	16 September 2012	2 December 2012	Krisse Salminen	Antonio Flores	Baba Lybeck
8 – Autumn 2013	10	12	8 September 2013	24 November 2013	Raakel Lignell	Manuela Bosco	Harri Syrjänen
9 – Autumn 2014	10	12	14 September 2014	30 November 2014	Pete Parkkonen	Anu Sinisalo	Janna Hurmerinta

=== Season 1 (2006) ===
Contestants:

- Tomi Metsäketo (tenor) partnered by Sanna Hirvaskari, eventual winners
- Kristiina Elstelä (actress) partnered by Marko Keränen, runners-up
- Jone Nikula (music executive, Idols judge) partnered by Katja Koukkula, sixth eliminated
- Keith "Keke" Armstrong (soccer coach) partnered by Helena Ahti-Hallberg, fifth eliminated
- Markus Pöyhönen (track athlete) partnered by Sanna Hento, fourth eliminated
- Katja Kannonlahti (news anchor) partnered by Jussi Väänänen, third eliminated
- Suvi Miinala (model, Miss Finland 2000) partnered by Juha Pykäläinen, second eliminated
- Leena Harkimo (member of Parliament) partnered by Erik Hento, first eliminated

=== Season 2 (2007) ===
Contestants:

- Mariko Pajalahti (musician) partnered by Aleksi Seppänen, eventual winners
- Sari Siikander (actress) partnered by Mikko Ahti, runners-up
- Sami Sarjula (actor) partnered by Sanna Hirvaskari, sixth eliminated
- Eppu Salminen (actor) partnered by Anna Sainila, fifth eliminated
- Jani Sievinen (swimmer) partnered by Helena Ahti-Hallberg, fourth eliminated
- Vanessa Kurri (model, Miss Finland 1999) partnered by Marko Keränen, third eliminated
- Roman Schatz (TV personality, writer) partnered by Saara Huovinen, second eliminated
- Pirkko Arstila (journalist, writer) partnered by Vesa Anttila, first eliminated

Singer Kirill Babitzin was to take part in the competition, but he suddenly died on 31 January. His place was taken by Schatz.

=== Season 3 (2008) ===
Contestants:

- Maria Lund (singer, actress) partnered by Mikko Ahti, eventual winners
- Nicke Lignell (actor) partnered by Susa Matson, runners-up
- Tuuli Matinsalo (athlete) partnered by Aleksi Seppänen, eighth eliminated
- Antti Kaikkonen (member of Parliament) partnered by Satu Markkanen, seventh eliminated
- Joonas Hytönen (TV personality) partnered by Kati Koivisto, sixth eliminated
- Vappu Pimiä (TV and radio personality) partnered by Jani Rasimus, fifth eliminated
- Merja Larivaara (actress) partnered by Janne Talasma, fourth eliminated
- Jimi Pääkallo (singer, actor) partnered by Anna Sainila, third eliminated
- Jyrki Anttila (tenor) partnered by Satu Suomi, second eliminated
- Sikke Sumari (TV personality, restaurateur) partnered by Daniel Ylimäki, first eliminated

=== Season 4 (2009) ===
Contestants:

- Satu Tuomisto (Miss Finland 2008, model) partnered by Janne Talasma eventual winners
- Pirkko Mannola (Miss Finland 1958, actress, singer) partnered by Mika Jauhiainen, runners-up
- Rosa Meriläinen (writer, ex-politician) partnered by Sami Helenius, eighth eliminated
- Wilson Kirwa (long-distance runner) partnered by Susa Matson, seventh eliminated
- Kim Herold (musician, ex-model) partnered by Sanni Siurua, sixth eliminated
- Miia Nuutila (actress) partnered by Vesa Anttila, fifth eliminated
- Bettina Sågbom (TV reporter) partnered by Jani Rasimus, fourth eliminated
- Mato Valtonen (musician, actor) partnered by Janica Mattsson, third eliminated
- Rolf Nordström (plastic surgeon) partnered by Nitta Kortelainen, second eliminated
- Simo Frangén (comedian) partnered by Satu Markkanen, first eliminated

=== Season 5 (2010) ===
Contestants:

- Antti Tuisku (singer) partnered by Anna-Liisa Bergström, eventual winners
- Laura Voutilainen (singer) partnered by Marko Keränen, runners-up
- Jukka Rasila (actor) partnered by Saana Akiola, eighth eliminated
- Joona Puhakka (diver) partnered by Sanni Siurua, seventh eliminated
- Nasima Razmyar (the refugee woman of 2010) partnered by Jani Rasimus, sixth eliminated
- Jethro Rostedt (CEO, took part in the second season of a Finnish version of the reality show The Apprentice) partnered by Susa Matson, fifth eliminated
- Satu Silvo (actress) partnered by Sami Helenius, fourth eliminated
- Maria Jungner (TV host) partnered by Aleksi Seppänen, third eliminated
- Juha Veijonen (actor) partnered by Sanna Hirvaskari, second eliminated
- Anna Perho (reporter) partnered by Janne Talasma, eliminated first

=== Season 6 (2011) ===
Contestants:

- Viivi Pumpanen (Miss Finland 2010, model) partnered by Matti Puro, eventual winners
- Jarppi Leppälä (Dudesons-star) partnered by Anna-Liisa Bergstrom, runners-up
- Jani Toivola (Member of Parliament, actor) partnered by Jutta Helenius, eight eliminated
- Mikko Parikka (actor) partnered by Katri Mäkinen, seventh eliminated
- Satu Ruotsalainen (former athlete, astrologist) partnered by Sami Helenius, sixth eliminated
- Jukka Tammi (former ice hockey player) partnered by Saana Akiola, fifth eliminated
- Siiri Nordin (singer) partnered by Jani Rasimus, fourth eliminated
- Anneli Sari (singer) partnered by Marko Keränen, third eliminated
- Veeti Kallio (actor, singer) partnered by Susa Matson, second eliminated
- Mari Perankoski (actress, screenwriter) partnered by Toni Rasimus, first eliminated

=== Season 7 (2012) ===
The seventh season aired in autumn 2012. Comedian Krisse Salminen won the season with Matti Puro, who also won the previous season.

- Krisse Salminen (comedian) partnered by Matti Puro (Winner)
- Nexar Antonio Flores (registered partnership of Pekka Haavisto) partnered by Disa Kortelainen (2. place)
- Baba Lybeck (journalist) partnered by Mikko Ahti (3. place)
- Sari Multala (competitive sailor) partnered by Sami Helenius (4. place)
- Risto Kaskilahti (actor) partnered by Susa Matson (5. place)
- Ristomatti Ratia (designer) partnered by Sanna-Maria Heikkilä (6. place)
- Erja Lyytinen (musician) partnered by Markku Hyvärinen (7. place)
- Amin Asikainen (boxer) partnered by Jutta Helenius (8. place)
- VilleGalle (rapper) partnered by Kia Lehmuskoski (9. place)
- Jippu (singer) partnered by Juri Trosenko (Last place)

=== Season 8 (2013) ===
The eighth season began on 15 September 2013. In this season, first time in the show's history, a competitor withdrew from the competition. Chef Harri Syrjänen injured his foot while practicing the dance and had to withdraw.

- Raakel Lignell (musician) partnered by Jani Rasimus, eight eliminated but returned to competition; eventual winners
- Manuela Bosco (actress and former sprinter) partnered by Matti Puro, runners-up
- Harri Syrjänen (chef) partnered by Jutta Helenius, withdrew on 11 November 2013
- Sari Havas (actress) partnered by Mikko Ahti, seventh eliminated
- Juhani Tamminen (ice hockey coach) partnered by Susa Matson, sixth eliminated
- Sami Hedberg (stand-up comedian) partnered by Anna Sainila, fifth eliminated
- Mert Otsamo (fashion designer) partnered by Ansku Bergström, fourth eliminated
- Mariska (singer) partnered by Aleksi Seppänen, third eliminated
- Juno (rapper) partnered by Kia Lehmuskoski, second eliminated
- Noora Karma (magician and mentalist) partnered by Janne Talasma, first eliminated

=== Season 9 (2014) ===
The ninth season began in October 2014 and ended in November 2014.

- Pete Parkkonen (singer) partnered by Katri Mäkinen, winners
- Anu Sinisalo (actress) partnered by Jani Rasimus, runners-up
- Janna Hurmerinta (singer) partnered by Matti Puro, eighth eliminated
- Cristal Snow (presenter and actor) partnered by Kia Lehmuskoski, seventh eliminated
- Kaj Kunnas (sports commentator) partnered by Susa Matson, sixth eliminated
- Anne Kukkohovi (model) partnered by Marko Keränen, fifth eliminated
- Sonja "Soikku" Hämäläinen (YouTube celebrity) partnered by Jurijs Trosenko, fourth eliminated
- Tommi Evilä (long jump athlete) partnered by Jutta Helenius, third eliminated
- Kai Vaine (actor) partnered by Lumi Rae, second eliminated
- Sinikka Sokka (actress) partnered by Topi Vierimaa, first eliminated

=== Season 10 (2017) ===
Tenth season began on 12 February 2017.

- Anna-Maija Tuokko (actress) partnered by Matti Puro, winners
- Kirsi Alm-Siira (news anchor) partnered by Marko Keränen, runners-up
- Laura Malmivaara (actress) partnered by Mikko Ahti, withdrew on 16 April 2017.
- Eevi Teittinen (fitness athlete) partnered by Jani Rasimus, sixth eliminated
- Musta Barbaari (rapper) partnered by Katri Mäkinen, fifth eliminated
- Pepe Willberg (musician) partnered by Jutta Helenius, fourth eliminated
- Ali Jahangiri (stand-up comedian) partnered by Saana Akiola, third eliminated
- Hanna Sumari (television presenter & journalist) partnered by Sami Helenius, second eliminated
- Kasmir (singer) partnered by Ansku Bergström, withdrew on 2 March 2017.
- Jarkko Tamminen (actor & impersonator) partnered by Susa Matson, first eliminated

=== Season 11 (2018) ===
Eleventh season began on 16 September 2018.

- Edis Tatli (boxer) partnered by Katri Mäkinen, winners
- Hannes Suominen (actor) partnered by Kia Lehmuskoski, runners-up
- Tuure Boelius (YouTube celebrity, singer) partnered by Ansku Bergström, third place
- Marja Hintikka (television presenter) partnered by Matti Puro, seventh eliminated
- Pekka Pouta (weather forecaster) partnered by Jutta Helenius, sixth eliminated
- Jaana Pelkonen (politician) partnered by Marko Keränen, fifth eliminated
- Lotta Näkyvä (model, Miss Finland 2013) partnered by Mikko Ahti, fourth eliminated
- Aki Linnanahde (radio host & television presenter) partnered by Saana Akiola, third eliminated
- Marita Taavitsainen (singer) partnered by Sami Helenius, second eliminated
- Aino-Kaisa Saarinen (cross-country skier) partnered by Jurijs Trosenko, first eliminated

=== Season 12 (2019) ===
Twelfth season was between 22 September and 1 December 2019.

- Christoffer Strandberg (actor, television host) partnered by Jutta Helenius, winners
- Jannika B (singer-songwriter) partnered by Aleksi Seppänen, runners-up
- Meeri Koutaniemi (photographer-journalist) partnered by Matti Puro, third place
- Laura Lepistö (figure skater) partnered by Marko Keränen, sixth eliminated
- Veronica Verho (radio host, YouTube celebrity) partnered by Jani Rasimus, fifth eliminated
- Olli Herman (rock singer) partnered by Katri Mäkinen, fourth eliminated
- Timo Lavikainen (actor) partnered by Kia Lehmuskoski, third eliminated
- Eini (singer) partnered by Sami Helenius, second eliminated
- Mika Poutala (speed skater) partnered by Ansku Bergström, first eliminated
- Mikael Jungner (politician) partnered by Saana Akiola, withdrew due injury

Mikael Junger broke his left ankle during the first live broadcast while doing a leap, leading to his withdrawal. Once during the season, the teaching dance partners were changed for one week. This is why the first ever same-sex partners in the Finnish competition was seen on 3 November, with Christoffer Strandberg and Matti Puro performing a Paso Doble, and Meeri Koutaniemi and Katri Mäkinen dancing a Fox-trot.

=== Season 13 (2020) ===
Thirteenth season aired in autumn 2020.

- Touko Aalto (politician) partnered by Jutta Helenius, first eliminated
- Kristiina Halttu (actress) partnered by Aleksi Seppänen, second eliminated
- Minna Parikka (fashion designer) partnered by Matti Puro, third eliminated
- Shirly Karvinen (model) partnered by Jani Rasimus, fourth eliminated
- Janina Fry (model) partnered by Anssi Heikkilä, fifth eliminated
- Jesse Markin (musician) partnered by Claudia Ketonen, sixth eliminated
- Sami Sykkö (journalist & presenter) partnered by Ansku Bergström, seventh eliminated
- Jukka Hildén (performer, member of stunt group The Dudesons) partnered by Katri Mäkinen, eighth eliminated
- Niklas Hagman (former ice hockey player) partnered by Kia Lehmuskoski, withdrew after testing positive for COVID-19
- Jare Brand (rapper) partnered by Saana Akiola, third place
- Miisa Rotola-Pukkila (YouTube celebrity) partnered by Marko Keränen, runners-up
- Virpi Sarasvuo (former cross-country skier) partnered by Sami Helenius, winners

=== Season 14 (2021) ===
Fourteenth season aired in autumn 2021

- Kari Kanala (vicar known from Ensitreffit alttarilla) partnered by Claudia Ketonen, first eliminated.
- Elina Gustafsson (ex-boxer) partnered by Ansku Bergström, second eliminated.
- Kristo Salminen (actor) partnered by Saana Akiola, third eliminated. In 19 September Salminen danced with Claudia Ketonen due his partner being sick
- Mikael Gabriel (rapper, musician) partnered by Tiia Elg, fourth eliminated.
- Viivi Huuska (photographer, director) partnered by Matti Puro, fifth eliminated.
- Sita Salminen (writer, social media influencer) partnered by Aleksi Seppänen, sixth eliminated.
- Kiti Kokkonen (actress) partnered by Marko Keränen, seventh eliminated
- Jenni Poikelus (radio host) partnered by Sami Helenius, eighth eliminated
- Aki Riihilahti (ex-football player) partnered by Katri Mäkinen, ninth eliminated
- Waltteri Torikka (baritone opera singer) partnered by Kia Lehmuskoski, 3rd placed
- Krista Siegfrids (singer, television host) partnered by Anssi Heikkilä, 2nd placed
- Ernest Lawson (actor, television host) partnered by Anniina Koivuniemi, winners

This season marked second time (since 12th season) when same-sex partner is presented, since Elina Gustafsson and Ansku Bergström are both women. On 17 October the teaching dance partners were changed for one week. During this week, 6 out of 7 remaining partners were same-sex.

=== Season 15 (2022) ===
Season 15 aired in autumn 2022. Winner of the previous season, Ernest Lawson replaced Mikko Leppilampi as a shows host.

- Evelina (singer) partnered by Marko Keränen, first eliminated.
- Katariina Kaitue (actress) partnered by Anssi Heikkilä, second eliminated
- Joel Harkimo (entrepreneur) partnered by Tiia Elg, third eliminated
- Alma Hätönen (radio host) partnered by Aleksi Seppänen, forth eliminated
- Siim Liivik (ice hockey player) partnered by Katri Mäkinen, fifth eliminated
- Maaret Kallio (writer, psychotherapist) partnered by Sami Helenius, sixth eliminated
- Mikko Nousiainen (actor) partnered by Kerttu Nieminen, seventh eliminated
- Signmark (rap artist) partnered by Anniina Koivuniemi, eighth eliminated. On October 30 Signmark danced with Katri Mäkinen during "Roosa nauha " prodcast due to Koivuniemi being sick. It was later announced that Mäkinen will dance with him for the rest of the season due to Koivuniemi withdrawing.
- Jaakko Loikkanen (news anchor) partnered by Ansku Bergström, third place.
- Sonja Kailassaari (television host) partnered by Matti Puro, runner-up.
- Benjamin Peltonen (singer) partnered by Saana Akiola, winners.

This season marks the first time when there is a deaf student (Signmark) and a "second generation" student (Joel Harkimo, whose mother, Leena Harkimo competed at the first season).

=== Season 16 (2023) ===
Season 16 aired in autumn 2023.

- Jussi Heikelä (radio & TV host) partnered by Claudia Ketonen, first eliminated.
- Maria Guzenina (Politician) partnered by Sami Helenius, second eliminated.
- Mikko Penttilä (actor) partnered by Kerttu Nieminen, third eliminated.
- Pia Penttala (Finland's Supernanny) partnered by Marko Keränen, forth eliminated.
- Sointu Borg (entrepreneur, Diili winner) partnered by Henri Tanner, fifth eliminated.
- Shawn Huff (ex-basketballer) partnered by Saana Akiola, sixth eliminated.
- Jarkko Niemi (actor) partnered by Kia Lehmuskoski, withdrewd due Niemi's health issues.
- Emma Kimiläinen (racer) partnered by Matti Puro, eighth eliminated.
- Yeboyah (rap artist) partnered by Valtteri Palin, seventh eliminated but returned to competition, eventually third place.
- Matti Suur-Hamari (para-snowboarder) partnered by Katri Riihilahti, runner-up.
- Pernilla Böckerman (fitness athlete/ social media influencer) partnered by Anssi Heikkilä, winners.

Actor Jarkko Niemi announced his withdrawal due health issues on November 13. During previous week, Niemi had got sick with a flu, which had a significant impact on his dance practices. By the end of the week, he felt better and Niemi was able to return to the dance hall, but on Sunday night's broadcast, his condition worsened again. Doctor ordered him a weeklong exercise ban. Yeboyah and her partner returned to the contest due Niemi's withdrawal. This season's final had extremely tight results with 3rd placed partner receiving 10%, runner-ups 44,7% and winners 45,3% of the votes.

=== Season 17 (2024) ===
Season 17 aired in autumn 2024.

- Annimari Korte (hurdler) partnered by Matti Puro, first eliminated
- Susani Mahadura (reporter, presenter) partnered by Mikko Matikka, second eliminated
- Sami Uotila (actor) partnered by Claudia Ketonen, third eliminated
- Olli Halonen (musician) partnered by Kerttu Nieminen, fourth eliminated
- Mika Saukkonen (journalist, sports commentator) partnered by Liisa Setälä, fifth eliminated
- Niina Lahtinen (actress, director) partnered by Sami Helenius, sixth eliminated
- Gogi Mavromichalis (reporter and presenter) partnered by Kia Lehmuskoski, seventh eliminated
- Arja Koriseva (singer) partnered by Valtteri Palin, eight eliminated
- Bess (singer) partnered by Marko Keränen, 3rd place
- Isaac Sene (artist) partnered by Kastanja Rauhala, runner-ups
- Linnea Leino (actress) partnered by Anssi Heikkilä, winners

=== Season 18 (2025) ===
Season 18 aired in autumn 2025. This was Vappu Pimiä's final season as a host.

- Sara Siipola (singer & musician) partnered by Jurijs "Jurza" Trosenko, first eliminated
- Mira Luoti (singer & musician) partnered by Anssi Heikkilä, second eliminated
- Mikko Silvennoinen (Eurovision commentator) partnered by Matti Puro, third eliminated. In 14 September Silvennoinen danced with Katri Riihilahti due his partner being sick.
- Tia-Maria "Tinze" Sokka (performer & twerk dancer) partnered by Valtteri Palin, fourth eliminated
- Pippa Laukka (writer, wellness trainer & sports medicine physician) partnered by Marko Keränen, fifth eliminated
- Marko Anttila (retired ice hockey player, former captain of Finland's men's national team) partnered by Kia Lehmuskoski, withdrew due injury
- Minna Kuukka (radio host) partnered by Mikko Ahti, sixth eliminated
- Kristiina Mäkelä (retired triple jump athlete) partnered by Sami Helenius, seventh eliminated
- Paulus Arajuuri (retired footballer) partnered by Liisa Setälä, 3rd place
- Eric "Lakko" Savolainen (YouTuber) partnered by Kastanja Rauhala, runner-ups
- Johannes Holopainen (actor) partnered by Katri Riihilahti, winners

This season marked the third time, since season 14, when same-sex partner are presented, since both Mikko Silvennoinen and Matti Puro are men. Marko Anttila hurt his foot while doing "sports-day-warm-up". Doctor told him that he can't continue the compotition.

=== Season 19 (2026) ===
Season 19 will air in autumn 2026. Veronica Verho replaced Vappu Pimiä as the female host.

- Dan ”Uniikki” Tolppanen (rapper) partnered by Liisa Setälä, first eliminated
- Anna Hanski (singer) partnered by Sami Helenius, second eliminated
- Johanna Puhakka (actress) partnered by Jurijs Trosenko, third eliminated
- Jani Halme (reporter) partnered by Claudia Ketonen, fourth eliminated
- Ellinoora (singer) partnered by Marko Keränen, fifth eliminated
- Linda Sällström (ex-footballer) partnered by Valtteri Palin, sixth eliminated
- Niko Lingman (Podcast Host) partnered by Katri Riihilahti, seventh eliminated
- Jaakko Parkkali (YouTuber) partnered by Kastanja Rauhala, eight eliminated
- Anni Ihamäki (radio-/TV host) partnered by Anssi Heikkilä, 3rd place
- Janne Saarinen (actor & radio host) partnered by Katri Riihimäki, runner-ups
- Matti Leino (actor) partnered by Kia Lehmuskoski, winners
