= Muodin huipulle season 1 =

Muodin huipulle
- Season 1
- Starring: Minna Cheung; Jaakko Selin; Anssi Tuupainen

Release
- Original network: MTV3
- Original release: 1 October – 17 December 2009

Season chronology
- Next → Season 2

The first season of Muodin huipulle (Finnish, "To the Top of Fashion") started airing on Finland's MTV3 on 1 October 2009 at 20.00. The show was hosted by fashion designer and entrepreneur Minna Cheung in Heidi Klum's role and fashion editor and host Jaakko Selin fills Tim Gunn's role as fashion mentor.

The winner of Muodin huipulle received a one-year contract with Spalt PR, one year cooperation with L'Oreal Paris hair and makeup, and a Bernina Sewing Machine worth €6,000. In addition to this, the winner's collection was featured in the February 2010 issue of Finnish fashion magazine Olivia.

== Contestants ==
=== Designers ===
(ages listed are the designers' ages at the time the show was taped in the summer of 2009)

Contestant	Age	Hometown	Place Finished
Hanna-Maaria Sinkkonen	23	Tampere	13th
Silja Jeskanen-Wehber	31	Barcelona, Spain	12th
Achilles Ion Gabriel	21	Helsinki	11th
Hely Seppänen	38	Suomussalmi	10th
Antti Putkonen	31	Oulu	9th
Laura Korhonen	27	Vantaa	8th
Olga Sjöroos	24	Turku	7th
Antti Asplund	27	Helsinki	6th
Jarno Viitala	33	Helsinki	5th-4th
Mirkka Metsola	28	Helsinki	5th-4th
Mert Otsamo	18	Oulu	3rd
Maria Jokela	32	Tampere	Runner-up
Katri Niskanen	23	Lahti	Winner

=== Models ===
- Aleksa
- Hanna-Maaria
- Inka
- Jessica
- Elina
- Liis
- Suada
- Katriina
- Fana
- Olga
- Sonja
- Liina
- Milla

== Season 1 Challenges ==
Designer elimination chart
Designer	1	2	3	4	5	6	7	8	9^{1}	10^{2}	11	12	Episode
Katri	WIN	WIN	IN	HIGH	IN	HIGH	WIN	IN	LOW	WIN	IN	WINNER	12 – Finale, Part 2
Maria	HIGH	IN	LOW	IN	WIN	IN	IN	WIN	HIGH	LOW	IN	OUT	12 – Finale, Part 2
Mert	IN	LOW	IN	WIN	IN	HIGH	HIGH	HIGH	WIN	HIGH	OUT		11 – Finale, Part 1
Jarno	IN	HIGH	IN	IN	LOW	WIN	IN	HIGH	HIGH	OUT			10 – Avant-garde
Mirkka	IN	IN	HIGH	LOW	IN	IN	HIGH	LOW	LOW	OUT			9 – Urban sportswear
Antti A.	LOW	IN	HIGH	HIGH	LOW	LOW	LOW	OUT					8 – Creativity, volume, masculinity and femininity
Olga	IN	LOW	HIGH	IN	HIGH	LOW	OUT						7 – Outfit for Jenni Vartiainen
Laura	IN	IN	WIN	IN	HIGH	OUT							6 – Olivia magazine dress
Antti P.	LOW	HIGH	IN	LOW	OUT								5 – Lingonberry inspired cocktail dress
Hely	LOW	IN	IN	OUT									4 – Recycled sweaters
Achilles	IN	IN	OUT										3 – Nanny's outfit
Silja	IN	OUT											2 – Glamour for the red carpet
Hanna-Maaria	OUT												1 – Evening outfit and designer's philosophy

The designer won Muodin huipulle.
The designer won the challenge.
The designer had one of the highest scores for that challenge, but did not win.
The designer had one of the lowest scores for that challenge, but was not eliminated.
The designer was in the bottom two, but was not eliminated.
The designer lost and was out of the competition.
The designer was eliminated in a double elimination.

- ^Note 1: Although Katri and Mirkka had low scores, there was no bottom two in episode 9, and no one was eliminated. Instead, Mert and Jarno were in the bottom two, but in fact being the "top two".
- ^Note 2: Maria was in the bottom three in episode 10, where there was double elimination.

Model Elimination Chart
Model	4^{1}	5	6	7	8	9	10^{2}	11^{2}	12
Inka	IN	IN	IN	WIN	IN	IN	WIN	IN	WINNER
Jessica	IN	IN	IN	IN	IN	WIN	IN	IN	OUT
Liina	IN	WIN	IN	IN	WIN	IN	IN	IN	OUT
Elina	IN	IN	IN	IN	IN	IN	IN	OUT	
Fana	IN	IN	WIN	IN	IN	IN	IN	OUT	
Suada	IN	IN	IN	IN	IN	OUT			
Liis	WIN	IN	IN	IN	OUT				
Katriina	IN	IN	IN	OUT					
Aleksa	IN	IN	OUT						
Sonja	IN	OUT							
Kati	OUT								

- ^Note 1: It was only announced in episode 4 that the models were in competition as well and Kati was eliminated. Models before episode 4 are not considered in this chart.
- ^Note 2: Because there no designer was eliminated in episode 9, no models were eliminated in episode 10.
- ^Note 3: There was no challenge in episode 11, so there were no winning or losing designs.

Light green background and WINNER means the model won Muodin huipulle.
Blue background and WIN means the model wore the winning design that episode.
Red background and IN means the model wore the losing design that episode.
Light gray background and OUT means the model was not picked and was out of the competition.

== Episode summaries ==
- Note: No episode titles are given in Finnish on the Muodin huipulle official webpage. Episode titles given here are not official and only reflect the nature of the challenges.

=== Episode 1: Designer's Philosophy ===
The designers met each other at their new home for the competition then were taken to their work space at Design Factory of Aalto University. Jaakko Selin greets the designers and gives them their first challenge: make an evening outfit which describes the contestant's design philosophy. The fabric was hanging on clotheslines behind the school and the designers had five minutes to collect it. Although Antti P was given low points for his juhannus dress, and Minna Cheung did not like it at all, judges Anssi Tuupainen and Teemu Muurimäki commended him for telling a Finnish story in the design. The judges found Hely's dress too over-designed and Hanna-Maria's outfit as "super boring". The winner received immunity for the next challenge.

- Judges: Minna Cheung, Anssi Tuupainen
- Guest Judge: Teemu Muurimäki
- WINNER: Katri
- OUT: Hanna-Maaria
- First Aired: 1 October 2009

=== Episode 2: Red Carpet ===
The designers are brought to the Tennispalatsi multiplex where they meet with the head of PR for L’Oréal, Nora Soini. The challenge is to make a dress suitable for the red carpet, with an emphasis on glamour, classic and design. The winner's garment will be featured on a limited edition bottle of L’Oréal Elnett hair spray in November 2009. The designers were given 30 minutes to sketch and a budget of €250 for fabric at Eurokangas. The criticism of the judges was that Mert's dress had too much going on, Olga's was poorly constructed and, although the dress was beautifully executed and showed classic glamour, Antti P's dress was too classic. This was the second win in a row for Katri.

- Judges: Minna Cheung, Anssi Tuupainen
- Guest Judge: Nora Soini
- WINNER: Katri
- OUT: Silja
- First Aired: 8 October 2009

=== Episode 3: Nannywear ===
The designers must create an outfit for a nanny that is both stylish and functional. The materials for the design was waiting for the contestants on the university lawn: umbrellas. They were given 10 hours to complete the challenge. The judges criticised Maria's design for being poorly executed and Achille's garment for being non-functional. The winner received immunity for the next challenge.

- Judges: Minna Cheung, Anssi Tuupainen
- Guest Judge: Seija Lukkala
- WINNER: Laura
- OUT: Achilles
- First Aired: 15 October 2009

=== Episode 4: Recycled Sweaters ===
Minna Cheung announces that Muodin huipulle is a competition for the designers' models too and that the winner will get an editorial spread in Olivia magazine. Antti P decides to take Achilles' (who was eliminated in the previous episode) model Elina. The designers are shocked when Hely decides to switch and take Katri's model Suada. The models then meet famous Finnish fashion designer Hanna Sarén who talks about recycling. Each designer gets a box filled with old sweaters and must create a bold look for a woman who wants to stand out in a crowd. The judges criticise Antti P for having a lack of boldness although great workmanship in the design and Hely for having no design in the garment. The judges also say that Antti A needs to refine his designs, although his signature tattered look was perfect for the challenge. A bitter Hely is eliminated, leaves without saying goodbye to her colleagues, and in her commentary, says that no one deserves to win Muodin huipulle. The winner received immunity for the next challenge.

- Judges: Minna Cheung, Anssi Tuupainen
- Guest Judge: Hanna Sarén
- WINNER: Mert
- OUT: Hely
- First Aired: 22 October 2009

=== Episode 5: Lingonberry Cocktail Dress ===
The designers go visit the Fazer factory where Brand Manager Päivi Svens gives them their challenge: make an elegant cocktail dress inspired by the lingonberry in the new Nordic Gourmet flavours. The designers are given €200 and 25 minutes to shop at Eurokangas. At the end of the first day, the designers fit the dresses on their models, and take them to a cocktail party where they meet Fazer executives and influential professionals in the Finnish fashion industry. The two Anttis are in the bottom two: Antti A for being a one-note and Antti P for not having complete ideas and that his dress was poorly executed. The winner received immunity for the next challenge.

- Judges: Minna Cheung, Anssi Tuupainen
- Guest Judges: Minna Parikka, Päivi Svens
- WINNER: Maria
- OUT: Antti P
- First Aired: 29 October 2009

=== Episode 6: Olivia Magazine ===
The designers meet with Fashion Editor of Olivia magazine, Sanna Sierilä, and given their next challenge: design an elegant, open collar and sleeveless dress for the Olivia woman. The idea behind the challenge is working with different kinds of material; in this case, the material was the magazine itself. The challenge winner's garment will be featured on the December 2009 cover of Olivia, worn by model Niina Herala. The designers are given 10 hours to work on their garments. The judges criticised Olga for not creating an Olivia woman look and Laura's dress for not living up to the challenge.

- Judges: Minna Cheung, Anssi Tuupainen
- Guest Judges: Niina Herala, Sanna Sierilä
- WINNER: Jarno
- OUT: Laura
- First Aired: 5 November 2009

=== Episode 7: Jenni Vartiainen ===
The designers' challenge is to make a feminine outfit for Finnish pop singer Jenni Vartiainen for both the stage and television appearances. The budget is €200 and the designers have 12 hours to complete their garments. The designers must also create a headpiece for the outfit made from toys. Although both Olga and Antti A were criticised for not following the challenge criteria to the fullest extent, Antti A's story for his design saved him from elimination. The winner received immunity for the next challenge.

- Judges: Minna Cheung, Anssi Tuupainen
- Guest Judges: Jenni Vartiainen
- WINNER: Katri
- OUT: Olga
- First Aired: 12 November 2009

=== Episode 8: Creativity, Volume, Masculinity and Femininity ===
The designers must find their creative sides with artist Ulla Kihlman by painting. After painting on large sheets outdoors, the designers must use these paintings as inspiration for their garments, which must play with volume and masculinity and femininity. The designers are given €100 and 15 minutes to shop for fabric and are also given 12 hours to complete their outfits. Even though he showed creativity, Antti A's violin dress was criticised for looking entirely too glued together, not using the colours of his painting and for looking too much like a costume for a children's play. The winner received immunity for the next challenge.

- Judges: Minna Cheung, Anssi Tuupainen
- Guest Judges: Merja Larivaara, Aki Choklat
- WINNER: Maria
- OUT: Antti A
- First Aired: 19 November 2009

=== Episode 9: Urban Sportswear ===
The designers are brought to Kiasma Museum in Helsinki, where they are given 40 min to sketch and get inspiration for the next challenge: design urban sportswear for a woman on the go. They are taken to the Halti sportswear company's main headquarters where they meet head designer Martti Kellokumpu and where they get materials. The designers get 12 hours to complete the outfit. On the second day of the challenge, Jaakko Selin brings a box of old Halti hoods for an addition requirement: make a purse that will fit a credit card, a mobile phone and an MP3 player. Jarno and Mert are in the bottom two, only to find out that Mert is the winner and Jarno was scored second highest. No one is eliminated for this challenge.

- Judges: Minna Cheung, Anssi Tuupainen
- Guest Judges: Karita Tykkä, Martti Kellokumpu
- WINNER: Mert
- OUT: No one
- First Aired: 26 November 2009

=== Episode 10: Avant-garde ===
Minna Cheung gives the designers the final challenge to determine who will make it to the finale: design an avant-garde outfit to match specific L'Oreal hair and make up looks which were preassigned to each model. The designers get €250, 30 minutes to shop and 8 hours to complete their work. Halfway through the challenge, Jarkko Selin announces that the designers may work on their outfits over night.

Designer	Model	Look
Jarno	Fana	Glamour punk
Katri	Inka	Hollywood
Maria	Jessica	English Rose
Mert	Liina	Metallic
Mirkka	Elina	Chicago

- Judges: Minna Cheung, Anssi Tuupainen
- Guest Judges: Daniel Palillo, Susanna Takkunen
- WINNER: Katri
- OUT: Mirkka and Jarno
- First Aired: 3 December 2009

=== Episode 11: Finale, Part 1 ===
After choosing their models Minna Cheung gives the designers their final challenge: create a collection of nine outfits for a special runway show. The budget is €2,000 and they have three months to complete their collections. Four weeks before the show, Jaakko Selin visits each designer in their hometowns: Maria in Tampere, Mert in Oulu and Katri in Lahti. During each visit, Jaakko gives the designers another challenge: create a tenth "showstopper" outfit to wow the audience. Three days before the runway show, the designers arrive back in Helsinki. They meet first with fashion designer Paola Suhonen for advice on the structure of a fashion show. Then, while Jaakko Selin is in Italy, Spalt PR Country manager and guest judge Siru Palmroos meets with each designer for mentoring.

- Judges: None
- Guest Judges: None
- WINNER: None
- OUT: None
- First Aired: 10 December 2009

=== Episode 12: Finale, Part 2 ===
The final runway show featured guest of honour Doutzen Kroes and Mario Cadenas from Project Runway season 1 in the audience. Kroes' personal favorite was Mert, whom she admired for his artistry. Mert's collection was inspired by his mother, who was an actress; Maria's collection was inspired by a Sitting Bull exhibition and Art Nouveau artists such as Alphonse Mucha; Katri's collection was inspired by nature. Maria's show featured a themed hairstyle, Katri's collection was easy to wear and Mart's collection was theatrical. The models consisted of the top three, who were slated to open each designer's show and close it with the showstopper, as well as the previously eliminated models. Liis, however, went missing. She was supposed to be one of Katri's models. The winner's collection and model will be featured in an issue of Olivia.

- Judges: Minna Cheung, Anssi Tuupainen
- Guest Judges: Siru Palmroos, Teemu Leino
- WINNER of Muodin huipulle: Katri
- OUT: Maria (1st Runner-Up) and Mert (2nd Runner-Up)
- First Aired: 17 December 2009
