= Nicke =

Nicke is a male given name. Notable people with this name include:

- Nicke Andersson (born 1972), Swedish musician
- Nicke Borg (born 1973), Swedish musician
- Nicke Kabamba (born 1993), English football player
- Nicke Lignell (born 1966), Finnish actor
- Nicke Widyawati (born 1967), Indonesian businesswoman
