= Stan Saanila =

Finnish stand-up comedian (born 1968)

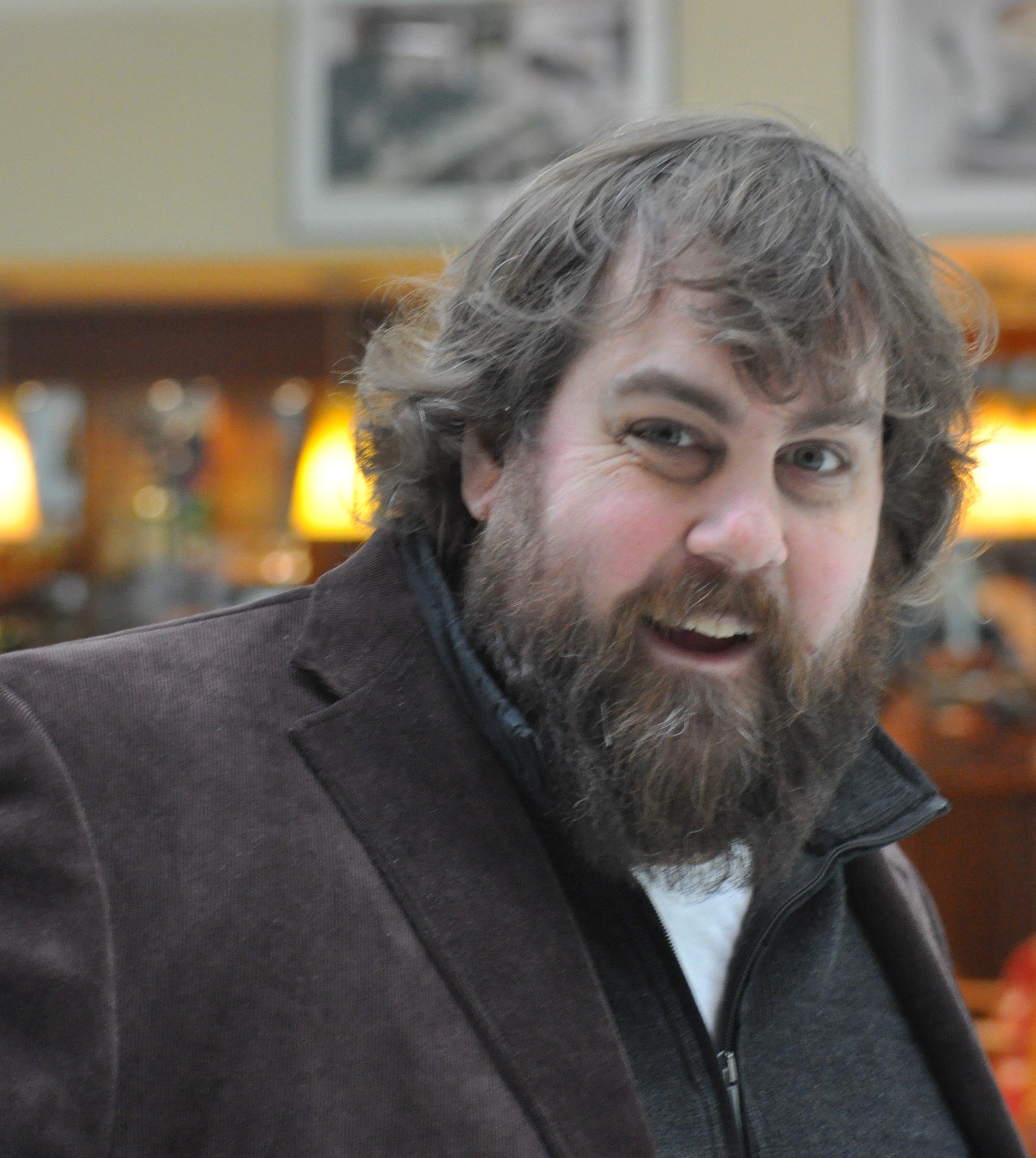
Stan Saanila in 2010.

Stefan Olof "Stan" Saanila (born 27 June 1968 in Helsinki) is a Finnish stand-up comedian. He was one of the team captains, opposite novelist Jari Tervo, in the television show Uutisvuoto, filling a vacancy left when longtime captain Tommy Tabermann stepped down in order to run for a place in the Parliament of Finland in 2007. Following Tabermann's election into the Parliament and his 2010 death, Saanila has continued as captain.

Saanila is also known for his work in other programs, such as W-tyyli and Hetimiten, and he had a role in the movie Miehen työ (2007). He has also done Detta om Detta with André Wickström.
