= Muodin huipulle season 2 =

Muodin huipulle
- Season 2
- Starring: Nora Vilva; Jaakko Selin; Janne Renvall

Release
- Original network: MTV3
- Original release: 22 February – 10 May 2011

Season chronology
- ← Previous; Season 1

The second season of Muodin huipulle (Finnish, "Project Runway") began airing on Finland's MTV3 on 22 February 2011 at 20.00. The show is hosted by model Nora Vilva and designer Janne Renvall is the contestants' mentor. Jaakko Selin, mentor in season one, is one of the regular judges.

The winner of Muodin huipulle will receive €40,000 worth of PR and management services by Huippu Design Management, a spot in Helsinki Design Week 2011 and an editorial spread in Olivia.

== Contestants ==
=== Designers ===
(ages listed are the designers' ages at the time the show was taped in 2010)

Contestant	Age	Hometown	Place Finished
Paula Kasurinen	27	Helsinki	14th
Jarna Papinniemi	23	Helsinki	13th
Caterina Montagni	27	Florence	12th-11th
Ville Lipponen	33	Helsinki	12th-11th
Anne-Mari Pahkala	26	Tampere	10th
Tuomas Kantola	29	Helsinki	9th
Mari Koppanen	20	Tampere	8th
Essi Karell	24	Espoo	7th
Suvi Jaskari-Marchesi	31	Seinäjoki	6th
Harriet Kjellman	27	Espoo	5th
Reta Raven	26	Hämeenlinna	4th
Jussi Salminen	22	Turku	2nd Runner-up
Leni Lauretsalo	27	Kotka	Runner-up
Linda Sipilä	29	Seinäjoki	Winner

=== Models ===
In order of elimination:

- Nina (with Paula before her elimination)
- Elisabeth (with Jarna before her elimination)
- Jessica (with Caterina before her elimination)
- Emilia (with Wille before his elimination)
- Hiu (with Essi before episode 6, now with Mari)
- Taru (with Harriet before episode 6, now eliminated)
- Tinja (with Leni before episode 6, now eliminated)
- Jasmin (with Reta before episode 6, now with Essi)
- Elena (with Linda before episode 6, now with Suvi)
- Leila (with Tuomas before episode 6, now with Harriet)
- Kerttu (with Anne-Mari before episode 6, now with Reta)
- Siiri (with Mari before episode 6, now with Jussi)
- Lotta (with Suvi before episode 6, now with Leni)
- Elina (with Jussi before episode 6, now with Linda)

== Challenges ==
Designer elimination chart
Designer	1	2	3^{1}	4	5	6	7	8	9	10	11	12	Episode
Linda	WIN	IN	WIN	IN	WIN	IN	HIGH	WIN	HIGH	WIN	LOW	WINNER	12 - Finale
Leni	IN	HIGH	IN	IN	LOW	IN	LOW	HIGH	HIGH	HIGH	WIN	OUT	12 - Finale
Jussi	IN	WIN	WIN	IN	LOW	LOW	LOW	LOW	WIN	LOW	LOW	OUT	12 - Finale
Reta	LOW	LOW	IN	LOW	HIGH	LOW	WIN	HIGH	LOW	OUT			10 - Wedding
Harriet	IN	HIGH	LOW	LOW	IN	LOW	IN	LOW	OUT				9 - 2015 Trends
Suvi	IN	IN	WIN	HIGH	LOW	WIN	HIGH	OUT					8 - Streetwear outfit
Essi	IN	IN	LOW	IN	LOW	HIGH	OUT						7 - Music and mixing models pack
Mari	IN	IN	LOW	WIN	IN	OUT							6 - Art Work Outfit
Tuomas	HIGH	IN	IN	LOW	OUT								5 - New Life, New Style
Anne-Mari	HIGH	IN	LOW	OUT									4 - Haute Couture Dress in White
Caterina	IN	HIGH	OUT										3 - Welcome to the Workshop!
Ville	LOW	LOW	OUT										3 - Welcome to the Workshop!
Jarna	LOW	OUT											2 - Spring is in the Air!
Paula	OUT												1 - Designer's Philosophy

The designer won Muodin huipulle.
The designer won the challenge.
The designer had one of the highest scores for that challenge, but did not win.
The designer had one of the lowest scores for that challenge, but was not eliminated.
The designer was in the bottom two, but was not eliminated.
The designer lost and was out of the competition.
The designer was eliminated in a double elimination.

- ^Note 1: There was no specified one winner, the entire team won the challenge.

== Episode summaries ==
=== Episode 1: Designer's Philosophy ===
At the opening party, the designers must locate the fabric for the upcoming first challenge. The designers are asked to design an outfit that depicts their design philosophy. Midway through the challenge, the designers were asked to swap fabrics by rotation.

- Guest Judges: Katri Niskanen and Sami Sykkö
- WINNER: Linda
- OUT: Paula
- First Aired: 22 February 2011

=== Episode 2: Spring is in the Air! (Kevät ilmassa!) ===
The designers must design an outfit that must be at least 1/3 flowers that evokes the spring season. The designers are not allowed to use sewing machines in this challenge.

- Guest Judge: Teemu Muurimäki
- WINNER: Jussi
- OUT: Jarna
- First Aired: 1 March 2011

=== Episode 3: Welcome to the Workshop! (Tervetuloa konepajalle!) ===
The designers are brought to a factory workshop to get inspiration to make a collection of outfits for business women in a team challenge. Each team is given €300 for fabric and 8 hours to complete the project.

The teams (leaders in bold):

- **Jussi**, Suvi and Linda
- **Mari**, Essi and Ville
- **Tuomas**, Leni and Reta
- **Harriet**, Caterina and Anne-Mari

- Guest Judge: Arman Alizad
- WINNER: Jussi, Suvi and Linda
- OUT: Ville and Caterina
- First Aired: 8 March 2011

=== Episode 4: Haute Couture Dress in White ===
The designers must design a white haute couture dress. During the process, we learn that Mari had no previous knowledge of John Galliano, but that didn't stop her from winning the challenge.

- Guest Judge: Tiia Vanhatapio
- WINNER: Mari
- OUT: Anne-Mari
- First Aired: 15 March 2011

=== Episode 5: New Life, New Style (Uusi elämä, uusi tyyli) ===
The designers must make dresses that are suitable for a summer party. Their models are regular people who have lost a considerable amount of weight and must use an old garment as some of the material for the new outfit.

- Guest Judge: Janina Fry
- WINNER: Linda
- OUT: Tuomas
- First Aired: 22 March 2011

=== Episode 6: Art Work Outfit (Pue taide työasuksi) ===
The designers visit the Espoo Museum of Modern Art for inspiration for their art work outfit. Midway through the challenge, Nora invites the designers to switch models.

- Guest Judges: Nana Salin and Ritva Falla
- WINNER: Suvi
- OUT: Mari
- First Aired: 29 March 2011

=== Episode 7: Musiikki ja mallit sekoittavat pakkaa(Music and mixing models pack) ===
The models reveal the inspirations for their designers one by one, which all turn out to be music genres. Additionally, the designers need not shop for fabric, since the models picked it out for them.

Suvi - Heavy Metal, Harriet - Techno, Linda - Argentine Tango, Jussi - Country, Essi - Reggae, Reta - Folk Music, Leni - Surf.

- Guest Judge: Kaarina Kivilahti
- WINNER: Reta
- OUT: Essi
- First Aired: 5 April 2011

=== Episode 8: Streetwear-asu(Streetwear outfit) ===
The designers are brought to a library to garner inspiration for their streetwear outfit.

- Guest Judges: Kirsimari Kärkkäinen and Tomi Freeman
- WINNER: Linda
- OUT: Suvi
- First Aired: 12 April 2011

=== Episode 9: 2015-Trendejä(2015 Trends) ===
The designers must design an outfit that projects the trends on 2015. Part of their materials comes from their submissions for the first challenge.

- Guest Judges: Sanna Sierilä and Minttu Vesala
- WINNER: Jussi
- OUT: Harriet
- First Aired: 19 April 2011

=== Episode 10: Hääpuku(Wedding) ===
The designers are brought to a hotel where they must absorb the atmosphere and contemplate their two wedding outfits: one being the wedding dress, and the other being a complementary night outfit. The judging session, given the non-Finnish guest judge, took place in English.

- Guest Judge: Efva Attling
- WINNER: Linda
- OUT: Reta
- First Aired: 26 April 2011

=== Episode 12: Lopullinen (Finale) ===
Show a collection of nine pieces.

- Guest Judges: Eva Krus and two others.
- WINNER: Linda
- RUNNER-UP: Leni
