= The Lyrics Board =

Irish television programme

- Also known as: Sing!
- Genre: Game show
- Created by: Philip Kampff; Andy Ruane
- Presented by: Aonghus McAnally; Kevin Hough; Linda Martin; John Keogh; Brendan Shine; Brian Ormond
- Country of origin: Ireland
- Original language: English

Production
- Production locations: RTÉ, TRTÉ
- Running time: 180 minutes approx including commercials
- Production company: Like It Love It

Original release
- Network: RTÉ, TRTÉ
- Release: 1992 – 2012

The Lyrics Board is an Irish game show hosted by Aonghus McAnally and then by Eurovision Song Contest 1992 winner Linda Martin. In each episode there are two teams. Each team consists of a piano player/team captain who is joined by two celebrities/singers, at either side. A team would choose a number from "the board", which had 4 to 6 numbers to choose from, revealing a word. The team would then have to sing, and play on the piano, a song with that related word to remain in charge of 'the board'. However, up to two numbers would reveal a "skip", a very common word such as "a" or "the", which if revealed would result in loss of control of the board. If the team sing the secret song whose lyrics is on the board, then this team would win a point, with the team with the most points declared as the winners.

Team captains on the show included former Eurovision winner Paul Harrington, Kyron & The Strangels frontman Kyron Bourke, You're A Star Musical Director Ronan Johnston and Jim Sheridan, keyboard player with the Camembert Quartet. 26 different versions have been produced worldwide.

The format was revamped for the 2011–2012 season by RTÉ for its TRTÉ strand. The new version of the format was called Sing! and was presented by former Pop Idol contestant Brian Ormond with former Six member Emma O'Driscoll and Royseven frontman Paul Walsh acting as team captains.

Programmes of it online were made available on RTE Player Christmas 2021 to celebrate 60 years of television.

By 2024, Norway is the only country that still produces their version of the show.

== International versions ==
| Region/Country | Local name | Main presenter | Network | Year premiered |
|---|---|---|---|---|
| Belgium (Flanders) | De notenclub | Kurt Van Eeghem (1998); Anja Daems (1999–2004) | VRT | 1998–2004 |
| Belgium (Flanders) | Sing That Song | Peter Van de Veire | VRT | 2013–2014 |
| Czech Republic | Hvězdy u piana | Helena Vondráčková; Daniel Barták; Petr Vondráček | TV Prima | February 16 – April 14, 2006 |
| Denmark | Op På Tangenterne | Michael Bundesen | TVDanmark | 1995–1998 |
| Denmark | Hit Med Sangen | Amin Jensen; Peter Kær | DR1 | 2000–2004; 2007 |
| Finland | BumtsiBum! Bumtsibum | Marco Bjurström; Kalle Lindroth | MTV3 | 1997–2005; 2017 |
| Finland | Bumtsibum | Jaana Pelkonen | Nelonen | 2021 |
| Indonesia | MeLirik Lagu | Indy Barends | Trans7 | 2004–2006 |
| Italy | Non sparate sul pianista | Carlo Conti | Rai Uno | 2010 |
| Italy | Non sparate sul pianista | Fabrizio Frizzi | Rai Uno | 2012 |
| Lebanon | هيك منغني; Heik Menghanni | Maya Diab | MTV Lebanon; MBC 1 | 2011–2015 |
| Netherlands | De notenclub | Paula Udondek | kro | 2000–2002 |
| Netherlands | De notenclub | Nance | TROS | 2005 |
| Norway | På Tangenten | Gunnar Andersen | TV2 | 1996 |
| Norway | Kamp i klaveret | Gunnar Andersen | TVNorge | 1997–1998 |
| Norway | Beat for Beat | Ivar Dyrhaug (1999–2015); Atle Pettersen (2016–present) | NRK1 | 1999–present |
| Poland | Śpiewające fortepiany | Rudi Schuberth | TVP2 | 2001–2005 |
| Romania | Duelul pianelor | Adrian Enache | TVR2 | 2016–2018 |
| Russia | Два рояля Dva royalya | Sergei Minaev; Valery Syutkin | RTR/Rossiya | 1998–2001; 2002–2003 |
| Russia | Два рояля Dva royalya | Sergei Minaev | TVC | 2004–2005 |
| Slovenia | Odpeto | ? | TOP TV | 2013 |
| South Africa | Liriekeraai | Soli Philander | kykNET | 2001–2003 |
| Sweden | Så ska det låta | Peter Harryson (1997–2005); Peter Settman (2006–2013); Kalle Moraeus (2014–2017); Sarah Dawn Finer (2018–2020) | SVT2 (1997–2000); SVT1 (2002–2020) | 1997–2020 |
| Vietnam | Trò chơi Âm nhạc | Vũ Anh Tuấn; Diễm Quỳnh; Lại Văn Sâm (2nd anniversary special only) | VTV3 | September 2, 2005 – October 31, 2012 |
| Wales | The Lyrics Game | Mike Doyle | BBC One Wales | August 8 – September 5, 2003 |

== See also ==
- Don't Forget the Lyrics! - another lyrics-themed game show
- The Singing Bee (American game show) - another lyrics-themed game show
