= Lybeck =

Lybeck is a surname of Norwegian, Danish or Swedish origin. Notable people with the surname include:

- Baba Lybeck (born 1966), Finnish journalist and television presenter
- Jan Lybeck, Swedish competitive sailor
- Otto Lybeck (1871–1947), Swedish Navy admiral
- Sigurd Lybeck (1895–1975), Norwegian farmer and writer
