= Muodin huipulle =

Finnish reality television series

- Created by: Eli Holzman
- Starring: Minna Cheung (season 1); Jaakko Selin; Anssi Tuupainen (season 1); Nora Vilva (season 2); Janne Renvall (season 2); Miisa Grekov (season 3); Sofia Järnefelt (season 3)
- Country of origin: Finland
- No. of seasons: 4
- No. of episodes: 47

Production
- Running time: Approx. 43 minutes

Original release
- Network: MTV3
- Release: 1 October 2009 – present

Muodin huipulle (Finnish, "To the Top of Fashion") is Finland's version of the American reality television series Project Runway. The show aired on Finland's MTV3 from 2009 to 2011. In February 2023, over a decade after its second season, the series returned for a third season with a new judging panel and mentor.

== Overview ==
The show began airing in October 2009 at 20.00. In addition, Muodin huipulle Extra started airing on MTV3's daughter channel Sub on 24 September at 21.00. The first season was hosted by fashion designer and entrepreneur Minna Cheung in Heidi Klum's role and fashion editor and host Jaakko Selin filled Tim Gunn's role as fashion mentor. The second season's host was model Nora Vilva and mentor was designer Janne Renvall. Janne Kataja, who is well known for working on MTV3 and Sub programs, hosted Muodin huipulle Extra.

The first season's winner, Katri Niskanen, received a one-year contract with Spalt PR, one year cooperation with L'Oreal Paris hair and makeup, and a Bernina Sewing Machine worth €6,000. In addition to this, the winner's collection was featured in the February 2010 issue of Finnish fashion magazine Olivia.

== Seasons ==
Season	Premiere date	Winner	Runner(s)-up	Other contestants (In order of elimination)	No. of contestants
1	1 October 2009	Katri Niskanen	Maria Jokela	Hanna-Maaria Sinkkonen, Silja Jeskanen-Wehber, Achilles Ion Gabriel, Hely Seppänen, Antti Putkonen, Laura Korhonen, Olga Sjöroos, Antti Asplund, Mirkka Metsola, Jarno Viitala, Mert Otsamo	13
2	22 February 2011	Linda Sipilä	Leni Lauretsalo	Paula Karsurien, Jarna Papinniemi, Caterina Montagni, Ville Lipponen, Anne-Mari Pahkala, Tuomas Kantola, Mari Koppanen, Essi Karell, Suvi Jaskari-Marchesi, Harriet Kjellman, Reta Raven, Jussi Salminen	14
3	2 February 2023	Pali Albin	Jarkko Karppinen, Sakari Säämäki	Lauri Järvinen, Kaisa Turtiainen, Krista Virtanen, Markus Aejmelaeus, Riikka Manni, Antèro Kabongo, Anna Palmén	10
4	8 February 2024	Miro Hämäläinen	Carla Norldund; Katariina Kekoni	Pinja Antikainen, Aleksi Peräkylä, Elias Pitkänen, Suvi Hänninen, Jutta Virtanen, Mauro Severino, Reetta Hellgren	10
