= BumtsiBum =

- Also known as: BumtsiBum!, Bumtsibum
- Starring: Marco Bjurström (1997–2005); Kalle Lindroth (2017)
- Country of origin: Finland
- Original language: Finnish
- No. of episodes: 245

Production
- Production locations: Pasila, Helsinki
- Running time: 60 minutes

Original release
- Network: MTV3
- Release: 13 September 1997 – 26 February 2005

BumtsiBum (formerly BumtsiBum! and Bumtsibum) is a Finnish weekly television game show based on the Irish game show The Lyrics Board and starred by Marco Bjurström. At the show's peak viewership, it was watched by 1.4 million people. In October 2016, it was announced that the show will return in March 2017, with Kalle Lindroth replacing Bjurström as the host.
