= Sami Sarjula =

Finnish actor (born 1978)

- Born: 30 July 1978 (age 47); Kangasniemi, Finland

Sami Sarjula (born 30 July 1978 in Kangasniemi) is a Finnish actor.

== Career ==
Sarjula has previously been the leading dancer in the Finnish show dance group Scandinavian Hunks.

From 2004 to 2013, Sarjula starred as Ossi Puolakka in the long-running Finnish drama series Salatut elämät.

In 2007, Sarjula was a competitor in Tanssii tähtien kanssa, the Finnish version of Dancing with the Stars, but was eliminated in the semifinals.
