= Tommy Tabermann =

Finnish contemporary poet and politician

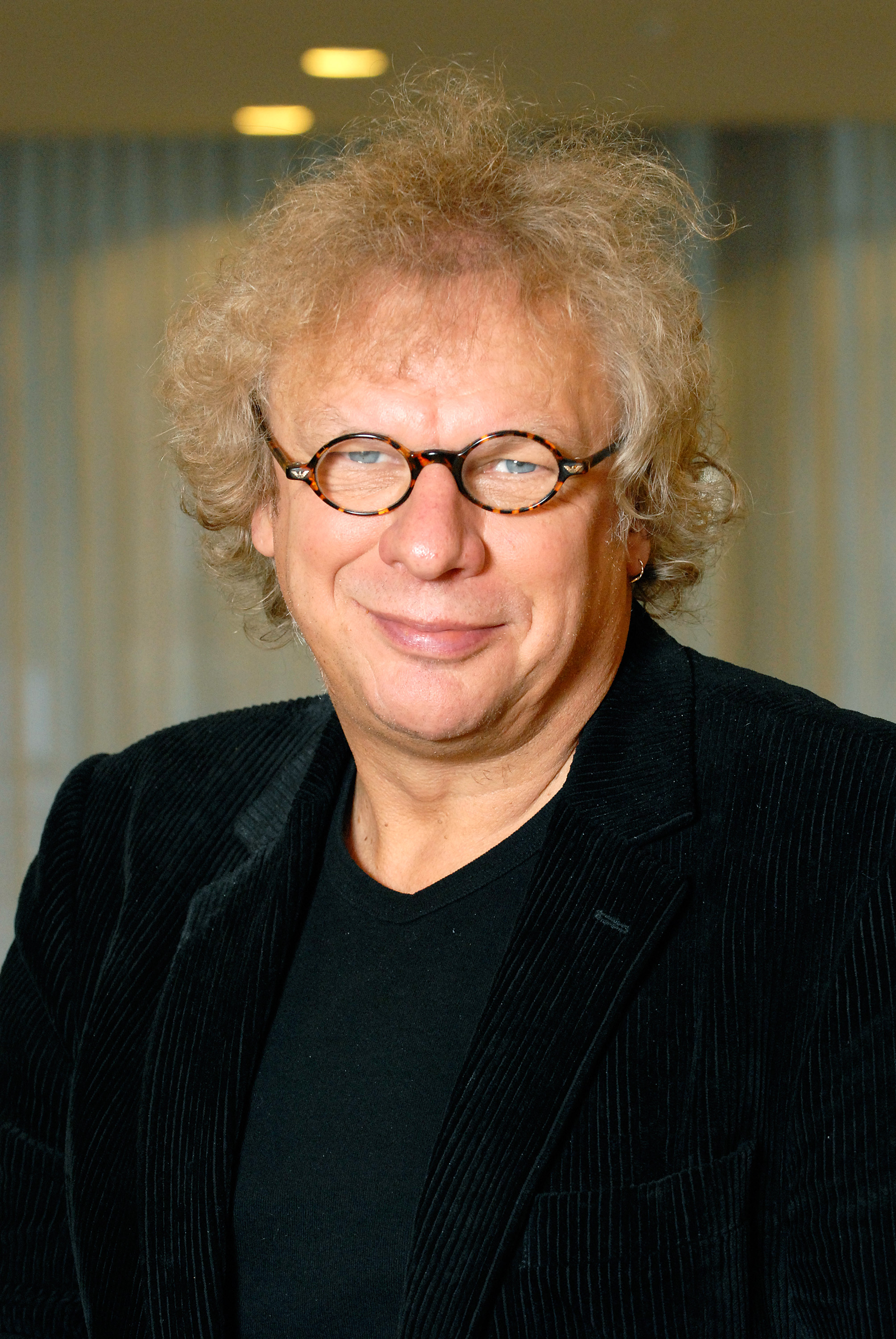
- Born: 3 December 1947; Ekenäs, Finland
- Died: 2 July 2010 (aged 62); Helsinki, Finland
- Citizenship: Finnish
- Occupations: Poet, Member of the Parliament

Tommy Tabermann (3 December 1947, Ekenäs – 2 July 2010, Helsinki) was a Finnish contemporary poet and politician, radio personality and journalist. Since 1998 and until 2006 he was known to Finnish audiences for his witty role as team captain in the weekly Saturday night television show Uutisvuoto, the Finnish version of Have I Got News For You, opposite the bestselling author Jari Tervo. Tervo characterised his popularity with the following anecdote: "When he was sixty, nine out of ten persons in an elevator at the Stockmann department store (in Helsinki) recognised him. The tenth person was Japanese."

He left the show in the spring of 2007 in order to run for the Parliament of Finland. Running as a Social Democrat Party candidate, he secured a nomination with 4,972 votes.

Tabermann came from a bilingual Swedish-Finnish family, both languages having been spoken in his childhood home. Despite being bilingual he wrote all his books in Finnish.

In August 2009 Tabermann was diagnosed with a malignant brain tumor. He died on 2 July 2010. He is buried in the Hietaniemi Cemetery in Helsinki.

Tabermann was first and foremost known as a love poet, and was actually sometimes referred to as an "apostle of love". His good friend and Uutisvuoto co-team captain Jari Tervo wrote of his feelings for Tabermann with the following words: "Now I personally know what the price of love is: it is sorrow."

Lähikuvassa Tommy Tabermann, a biography of the poet by Juha Numminen, was released in the autumn of 2010.

== Bibliography ==
- Ruusuja Rosa Luxemburgille, 1970
- Kun kaikki kellot sydämessä soivat, 1972
- Aivan kuin joku itkisi, 1973
- Tähtiä kämmenellä, 1974 (reprinted 1995)
- Päivä päivältä rakkaampaa, 1975
- Kaipaus, 1976
- Anna minä kumoan vielä tämän maljan, 1977
- Suudelma, 1977
- Kukkiva kivi, 1978
- Jumalatar, 1979
- Kipeästi keinuu keinumme, 1979
- Ihmisen ääni, 1979 (a collection of essays)
- Intohimon panttivanki, 1980
- Vedenpaisumus, 1981
- Pennissimo, 1982
- Ylistyslauluja ihanalle ruumiillesi, 1983
- Täyttymyksen jano, 1983
- Pienten kerjäläisten rukouskirja, 1984
- Tosimies vie eikä vikise, 1984 (together with Seppo Hyrkäs)
- Nälän ja selibaatin runot, 1985
- Rukous viinille, kivulle, naurulle ja työlle, 1985
- Tapani tulette tuntemaan, 1985 (with Seppo Hyrkäs)
- Rohkeus, 1986
- Kerubi, 1987
- Maa Ilma Tuli Vesi, 1987
- Tulevaisuus on rakkauden vihollinen, 1988
- Unelmien kapina, 1989
- Martyyrit, 1990
- Lauluja suuresta halusta, 1991
- Soturi, 1992
- Ihon ääni, 1992
- Courage — matkakirje miehuudesta, 1992
- Oljenkorsia — värssyjä ettei virta veis, 1993
- Rakkaudesta ja pyhästä vihasta, 1994
- Sallittu hedelmä, 1994
- Bryssä tulee, 1994 (with Seppo Hyrkäs)
- Janus, 1995
- Aistien alamainen, 1995
- Duende, 1996
- Unta ja verta, 1997
- Desire, 1997
- Sallittu hedelmä, 1998 (expanded edition)
- Demoni, 1998
- Ihme nimeltä Me, 1999
- Oodeja kahdelle iholle, 2000
- Maalliset mantrat, 2000
- Julian parveke, 2000
- Passionata, 2001
- Luovuuden lumous, 2002
- Fatiman neljäs ennustus, 2002
- Alaston, 2003
- Yksinäinen tyttö ja yksisarvinen, 2003
- Kirje nuorelle rakastajalle. Ihmisen ääni nro 36, 2003
- Vernazzan valot, 2004
- Kiitti vitusti -kappale, 2004
- Rakkauden kolme kehää, 2005
- Perhonen paidan alla, 2005
- Suutele minulle siivet, 2006
- Pelastaja, 2006
