= Bordertown (Finnish TV series) =

Finnish crime drama television series

- Finnish title card
- Finnish: Sorjonen
- Genre: Crime drama; Nordic noir
- Created by: Miikko Oikkonen
- Directed by: Miikko Oikkonen; Jyri Kähönen; Juuso Syrjä; Marko Mäkilaakso; Jussi Hiltunen
- Starring: Ville Virtanen; Matleena Kuusniemi; Anu Sinisalo; Lenita Susi; Kristiina Halttu; Olivia Ainali; Ilkka Villi
- Country of origin: Finland
- Original language: Finnish
- No. of seasons: 3
- No. of episodes: 31

Production
- Production location: Lappeenranta
- Running time: 58 minutes
- Production companies: Fisher King Production; Federation Entertainment

Original release
- Network: Yle TV1
- Release: 16 October 2016 – 1 December 2019

Bordertown (Finnish: Sorjonen) is a Finnish crime drama and Nordic noir television series created by Miikko Oikkonen and starring Ville Virtanen as detective inspector Kari Sorjonen. The first season, which consisted of eleven episodes, premiered in Finland on 16 October 2016 on Yle TV1. Season two, containing ten episodes, premiered on 7 October 2018, and season three, containing another ten episodes, premiered in December 2019. The series has received praise both in Finland and internationally.

== Overview ==
Detective inspector Kari Sorjonen is one of the most respected officers at the National Bureau of Investigation (NBI) in Finland when his wife barely survives brain cancer. Sorjonen is a high-functioning autistic and exhibits traits related to savantism. The character is based on British writer Daniel Tammet and also resembles an 'everyman'-type Sherlock Holmes.

Sorjonen takes a new job, initially leading SECRI, the Serious Crime Unit, in the city of Lappeenranta, South Karelia, Finland. He moves his family to the city near the border with Russia for a more peaceful life. Things turn out to be less than calm there, however. Interwoven with casework from SECRI, Sorjonen attempts to be a devoted husband to a wife recovering from a health scare, as well as a devoted father to a daughter. His work often takes precedence over family concerns, something his wife and daughter wrestle with throughout the series. Although singularly focused on his investigations, Sorjonen clearly has a closeness not only with his family but also with the other team members of SECRI, especially Niko, Lena, and H. P.

== Cast and characters ==
=== Main ===
- Ville Virtanen as Detective Inspector Kari Sorjonen
- Matleena Kuusniemi as Pauliina Sorjonen
- Anu Sinisalo as Detective Constable Lena Jaakkola
- Lenita Susi as Katia Jaakkola
- Kristiina Halttu as Detective Superintendent Taina Perttula
- Olivia Ainali as Janina Sorjonen
- Ilkka Villi as Detective Constable Niko Uusitalo

=== Recurring ===
- Max Bremer as Coroner Hannu-Pekka Lund
- Matti Laine as Risto Susi-Huhtala
- Jasmin Hamid as Jenna "Jänis" Luhta
- Janne Virtanen as Robert Degerman
- Mikko Leppilampi as Mikael Ahola
- Laura Malmivaara as Anneli Ahola
- Niina Nurminen as Johanna Metso
- Elias Salonen as Elias Ström
- Sampo Sarkola as Lasse Maasalo
- Eriikka Väliahde as Satu-Maria Porttila
- Svante Martin as Gösta Liljeqvist
- Satu Paavola as Veera Niemi
- Maria Kuusiluoma as Jaana Erkki
- Johan Storgård as Tuomas Heikkinen
- Robert Enckell as Paul Degerman

== Episodes ==
Series	Episodes	Originally released	
Series	Episodes	First released	Last released
1	11	16 October 2016	25 December 2016
2	10	7 October 2018	9 December 2018
3	10	1 December 2019	2 February 2020

=== Season 1 (2016) ===
No. overall	No. in season	Title	Directed by	Written by	Original release date
1	1	"The Dolls' House, part 1" (Finnish: Nukkekoti, osa 1)	Miikko Oikkonen	Miikko Oikkonen, Atro Lahtela, Matti Laine, Antti Pesonen	16 October 2016
Kari Sorjonen moves to Lappeenranta with his wife and daughter. A body of a woman is found in a lake. Esa Kuparinen, who works under an escort service, transports young women from Russia to Finland. Kuparinen abducts Katia Jaakkola because he wants to protect her. Katia's mother, Lena Jaakkola, who works at the FSB, starts searching for her missing daughter. She finds Kuparinen's dead body in an auto repair shop.
2	2	"The Dolls' House, part 2" (Finnish: Nukkekoti, osa 2)	Miikko Oikkonen	Miikko Oikkonen, Atro Lahtela, Matti Laine, Antti Pesonen	23 October 2016
Kuparinen's death is investigated. Sorjonen becomes aware of Lena Jaakkola and follows her. They meet at the Dolls' House, a wooden cabin, and Sorjonen is held at gunpoint by Lena.
3	3	"The Dolls' House, part 3" (Finnish: Nukkekoti, osa 3)	Miikko Oikkonen	Miikko Oikkonen, Atro Lahtela, Matti Laine, Antti Pesonen	30 October 2016
Sorjonen and Jaakkola work together to find the culprit. Gösta Liljeqvist is arrested, and Katia and Lena reunite.
4	4	"Dragonflies, part 1" (Finnish: Sudenkorennot, osa 1)	Jyri Kähönen	Miikko Oikkonen, Matti Laine, Atro Lahtela, Antti Pesonen	6 November 2016
Single parent Emilia Serala smuggles drugs from St. Petersburg to Finland. Mika Tenhola, a young athlete, buys these drugs. Santeri Kaminen, a narcotics officer, is found dead in a hotel with twelve stab wounds. Mika is also found dead at his home.
5	5	"Dragonflies, part 2" (Finnish: Sudenkorennot, osa 2)	Jyri Kähönen	Miikko Oikkonen, Matti Laine, Atro Lahtela, Antti Pesonen	13 November 2016
Lena Jaakkola joins Sorjonen's team. They track down Ben Rantala, a friend of Mika's. He organized a house party, also attended by Sorjonen's daughter, Janina. Ben spikes Janina's drink, after which she is found unconscious in the pool.
6	6	"The Fury, part 1" (Finnish: Raivotar, osa 1)	Jyri Kähönen	Miikko Oikkonen, Antti Pesonen, Matti Laine, Atro Lahtela	20 November 2016
Coroner H.P. Lund is in a relationship with an escort, Natasha. One day, foam comes out of Natasha's mouth during sex, and she ends up in a hospital, where she has convulsions. It is found that Natasha has rabies from dog bites. At the same time, Degerman-family warehouses have been broken into, and dogfights have been organized there.
7	7	"The Fury, part 2" (Finnish: Raivotar, osa 2)	Jyri Kähönen	Miikko Oikkonen, Antti Pesonen, Matti Laine, Atro Lahtela	27 November 2016
Sorjonen's team and a Danish police officer work together. A club run by Iskariot Ranta is uncovered in the Lappeenranta quarry. Dogfighting is organized there, and Lena Jakkola and her daughter, Katia, are kidnapped and brought there.
8	8	"The Lady in the Lake, part 1" (Finnish: Nainen järvessä, osa 1)	Juuso Syrjä	Miikko Oikkonen, Atro Lahtela, Antti Pesonen, Matti Laine	4 December 2016
A woman in a fishing trap is found in a lake. She is still alive but in bad condition. It is found that she was a sex worker in Russia. At the same time, politician Minttu Vestarinen's car has been stolen, and Sorjonen's boss wants to prioritize this case.
9	9	"The Lady in the Lake, part 2" (Finnish: Nainen järvessä, osa 2)	Juuso Syrjä	Miikko Oikkonen, Atro Lahtela, Antti Pesonen, Matti Laine	11 December 2016
Politician Jaakko Anttila is found dead in a car that is pulled from a river in Russia. Both cases turn out to be connected. Minttu's husband, Ville, is found guilty.
10	10	"The End Game, part 1" (Finnish: Loppupeli, osa 1)	Juuso Syrjä	Miikko Oikkonen, Antti Pesonen, Atro Lahtela, Matti Laine	18 December 2016
Sorjonen's daughter, Janina, is found bloodied in a boat in the middle of Saimaa Lake. The body of Esko Kaartinen, a social worker, is also discovered on the boat. Janina does not remember what happened to her; she is accused of the murder and transported to Pelso prison. Other people are found missing: Seppo Paltemaa and Anne Volkoff, both of whom have been drugged. The suspect becomes Lasse Maasalo, a police lab worker. His house later burns down.
11	11	"The End Game, part 2" (Finnish: Loppupeli, osa 2)	Juuso Syrjä	Miikko Oikkonen, Antti Pesonen, Atro Lahtela, Matti Laine	25 December 2016
Maasalo is arrested and interrogated. Sorjonen cannot prove Maasalo is the culprit, however, as there is no physical evidence. After being released on bail, Maasalo commits suicide using a bomb. Prior to his death, he sends files to Sorjonen, proving his guilt. However, it is later found that Maasalo is still alive.

=== Season 2 (2018) ===
No. overall	No. in season	Title	Directed by	Written by	Original release date
12	1	"Five Finger Exercise, part 1" (Finnish: Viiden sormen harjoitus 1/2)	Jyri Kähönen	Miikko Oikkonen, Paula Mononen	7 October 2018
SECRI investigates the murder of a woman and her son, which may be connected to detective Lena Jaakkola's past actions in the FSB.
13	2	"Five Finger Exercise, part 2" (Finnish: Viiden sormen harjoitus 2/2)	Jyri Kähönen	Miikko Oikkonen, Paula Mononen	14 October 2018
The investigation continues as Lena, Kari, and Katia make contact with a Russian convict who claims to be Katia's biological father.
14	3	"The Rite of Spring, part 1" (Finnish: Kevätuhri 1/2)	Jyri Kähönen, Juuso Syrjä	Paula Mononen, Miikko Oikkonen	21 October 2018
The manager of a local daycare becomes the subject of a SECRI investigation after an aborted fetus is discovered at her home.
15	4	"The Rite of Spring, part 2" (Finnish: Kevätuhri 2/2)	Jyri Kähönen, Juuso Syrjä	Paula Mononen, Miikko Oikkonen	28 October 2018
Kari and the SECRI team uncover a conspiracy connected to a daycare manager's dark past.
16	5	"Cat's Cradle, part 1" (Finnish: Kissan kehto 2/2)	Juuso Syrjä	Antti Pesonen, Miikko Oikkonen	4 November 2018
Niko leads the search for a deadly sniper, while Kari takes leave to look after Pauliina, who is undergoing cancer treatment.
17	6	"Cat's Cradle, part 2" (Finnish: Kissan kehto 2/2)	Juuso Syrjä	Antti Pesonen, Miikko Oikkonen	11 November 2018
The search for the shooter intensifies as the police declare a curfew following more killings.
18	7	"The Bloodmaid, part 1" (Finnish: Verenneito 1/2)	Juuso Syrjä	Miikko Oikkonen	18 November 2018
When a body is found in the wall of a student's flat, SECRI must find the link between the student, the victim, and another young woman reported missing.
19	8	"The Bloodmaid, part 2" (Finnish: Verenneito 2/2)	Juuso Syrjä	Miikko Oikkonen	25 November 2018
More mutilated remains are discovered as SECRI searches for a killer with possible cannibalistic tendencies.
20	9	"Without a Shadow, part 1" (Finnish: Varjoa vailla Osa 1)	Jyri Kähönen	Miikko Oikkonen, Paula Mononen	2 December 2018
Two young men take the Sorjonen family hostage, forcing Kari to investigate the suspicious disappearance of their mother.
21	10	"Without a Shadow, part 2" (Finnish: Varjoa vailla Osa 2)	Jyri Kähönen	Miikko Oikkonen, Paula Mononen	9 December 2018
The hostage situation at the Sorjonen household intensifies, as Lena travels to Russia to help Kari with the investigation.

=== Season 3 (2019–2020) ===
No. overall	No. in season	Title	Directed by	Written by	Original release date
22	1	"Human Stain" (Finnish: Ihmisen tahra)	Marko Mäkilaakso	Miikko Oikkonen	1 December 2019
Deaths close to home affect the Sorjonen family and acquaintances.
23	2	"The Human Beast 1/2" (Finnish: Ihmispeto 1/2)	Juuso Syrjä	Miikko Oikkonen, Sanna Reinumägi	8 December 2019
Body parts from multiple victims point to a killer interested in revenge.
24	3	"The Human Beast 2/2" (Finnish: Ihmispeto 2/2)	Juuso Syrjä	Miikko Oikkonen, Sanna Reinumägi	15 December 2019
The body count mounts as Sorjonen tries desperately to out-think his opponent.
25	4	"Sons and Lovers 1/3" (Finnish: Poikia ja rakastajia 1/3)	Jussi Hiltunen	Miikko Oikkonen	22 December 2019
The Sorjonen family continues to grow distant from each other as Kari tries to solve the murder of a family patriarch.
26	5	"Sons and Lovers 2/3" (Finnish: Poikia ja rakastajia 2/3)	Jussi Hiltunen	Miikko Oikkonen	29 December 2019
Kari struggles with issues from his past as he searches for the guilty party; the Sorjonens grow further apart.
27	6	"Sons and Lovers 3/3" (Finnish: Poikia ja rakastajia 3/3)	Jussi Hiltunen	Miikko Oikkonen	5 January 2020
After another key suspect dies, Kari reveals a family secret from his past, while his daughter's behavior gets more bizarre.
28	7	"The Lady in the Looking-Glass 1/2" (Finnish: Nainen peilissä 1/2)	Marko Mäkilaakso	Paula Mononen, Miikko Oikkonen	12 January 2020
A remote religious sect must deal with an unknown murderer, amidst uncovered secrets; Kari's daughter continues on a dangerous path.
29	8	"The Lady in the Looking-Glass 2/2" (Finnish: Nainen peilissä 2/2)	Marko Mäkilaakso	Paula Mononen, Miikko Oikkonen	19 January 2020
The investigation of the sect members concludes as Kari and his daughter face a reckoning.
30	9	"Chess Story 1/2" (Finnish: (Shakkitarina 1/2)	Juuso Syrjä	Paula Mononen, Miikko Oikkonen	26 January 2020
An old enemy re-emerges just as Kari finds himself confined at the local hospital in a medical lockdown.
31	10	"Chess Story 2/2" (Finnish: Shakkitarina 2/2)	Juuso Syrjä	Paula Mononen, Miikko Oikkonen	2 February 2020
Sorjonen races to save the town from Maasalo's poisonous plot, as the battle of wits between the two draws to a close.

== Development and production ==
Bordertown is produced for Yle by Fisher King Production and Federation Entertainment. The series was presented at the MIPTV Media Market in Cannes on 3 April 2016, where it competed in the MIPDrama Screenings for the "Coup de Cœur" award.

International distribution rights were acquired from Federation Entertainment in October 2016 by Sky Deutschland for Germany, CanalPlay for France, and VRT for Flanders (Dutch-speaking Belgium). The series was sold to "over 40 countries".

Bordertown was renewed for a second season on 25 April 2017, with Kuusniemi, Sinisalo, Susi, Ainali, and Villi also reprising their roles. Filming began in Lappeenranta on 8 August 2017 and wrapped in Helsinki on 7 November 2017.

The series was renewed for a third season in September 2018, with filming starting on 13 December 2018. The season premiered in December 2019, and it has been labelled as the final one.

== Release ==
=== Broadcast ===
Bordertown premiered on Yle TV1 on 16 October 2016. The debut was watched by 1.1 million viewers and set a record for a Finnish series. Total viewership for season one was an average of one million viewers.

Season two premiered on 7 October 2018 (it was originally scheduled to premiere on 14 October).

Season three premiered on 1 December 2019.

=== Home media ===
Netflix acquired rights in February 2017 to stream the series in the United States, Canada, the United Kingdom, Norway, Sweden, Denmark, Ireland, Iceland, Eastern Europe, Russia, and the Netherlands. Streaming of season one became available on 31 March 2017, followed by season two on 2 February 2019, and season three on 11 May 2020.

Season one was released on DVD and Blu-ray in Germany by EuroVideo on 14 February 2019, followed by season two on 11 April 2019.

== Reception ==
In addition to its home country, Bordertown has received praise internationally; fans of the series include American author Stephen King, Hollywood actress Gwyneth Paltrow, and Monty Python star Eric Idle.

== Awards and nominations ==
Bordertown won the 2017 Golden Venla Awards for Best Drama Series, Best Actor (Ville Virtanen), and Best Actress (Anu Sinisalo).

== Continuation ==
Bordertown: The Mural Murders, a film based on the series, premiered in the autumn of 2021 and featured the characters from the television series. The film, an independent work, was produced by Fisher King Oy. International distribution is also planned. Netflix acquired rights on 1 December 2021.
