= Beat for Beat =

Norwegian television series

Beat for Beat is a Norwegian musical variety show that airs every Friday on NRK1. It has been on the air since 1999, and consistently ranks in the top of Norwegian viewing figures. It was hosted by Ivar Dyrhaug from the beginning to 2015. From 2016 it was, and is hosted by Atle Pettersen.

== Concept ==
In each episode there are two teams. Each team consists of a piano player/team captain who is joined by two celebrities/singers, at either side. A team would choose a number from one to five, from "the board", revealing a word. The team would then have to sing a song with that related word to remain in charge of 'the board'. If the team sings the secret song which is on the board, then this team would win a point, with the team with the most points declared as the winners. Pianist Trond Nagell Dahl has been with the show since the start. Pianist Gisle Børge Styve left the show together with Ivar Dyrhaug and was replaced by Lars Andreas Aspesæter.

The show is based upon the Irish game show The Lyrics Board.

== Competitors ==
While the competitors are usually singers or musical artists, there have been several instances where the teams are made up of other Norwegian celebrities, such as comedians or TV personalities.

== Band line-up ==
- Trond Nagell Dahl - piano player/team captain (1999-present)
- Gisle Børge Styve - piano player/team captain (1999-2014)
- Lars Andreas Aspesæter - piano player/team captain (2015-present)
- Eirik Kiil Saga - bandleader, conductor, keyboard, synths (2019-present)
- Hugo Risdahl - guitars (2019-present)
- Julie Falkevik Tungevåg - keyboard, guitar, percussion and backing vocals (2019-present)
- Henrik Hilmersen - bass, synth-bass (2019-present)
- Åsmund Knutson - electric drums (2019-present)
- Trond Lien - bandleader, conductor, piano, keyboard, Hammond organ (1999-2019)
- Ole Petter Hansen Chylie - drums (1999-2019)
- Frøydis Grorud - saxophone, flute, percussion, keyboard (1999-2019)
- Erik Højgaard Anti - bass (2002-2019)
- Børge Petersen-Øverleir - guitar (2013-2019)
- Jørn Fodnestøl - guitar (1999-2012)
- Jens Thoresen - substitute guitar-player (2016)
- Kåre Kolve - substitute saxophone-player (1999, 2001)
- Lars Endrerud - bass (1999-2002)
- Tom Rønningsveen - substitute bandleader, conductor, piano, keyboard, Hammond organ (2003)
- Javed Kurd - music producer, composer of the theme song (1999-present)
