= Uutisvuoto =

- Written by: Yasir Gaily; Teemu Vesterinen
- Presented by: Peter Nyman (1998–2010, 2019); Baba Lybeck (2010–2018)
- Starring: Jari Tervo (1998–2017); Stan Saanila (2007–2017, 2019); Tommy Tabermann (1998–2007)
- Original language: Finnish
- No. of episodes: 700

Production
- Running time: 30 minutes (1998–2017); 45 minutes (2017–2018); 60 minutes with ad breaks (2019)
- Production company: Banijay Finland

Original release
- Network: Yle TV1 (1998–2018); MTV3 (2019)
- Release: 21 February 1998 – 12 November 2019

Uutisvuoto (Finnish for "newsleak" - the pun works equally in both languages) is the Finnish version of the popular British panel show Have I Got News For You. Broadcast on Saturday nights on Yle TV1 from 1998 until 2018, the show received very high viewing figures. Uutisvuoto was aired on Yle TV1 from 1998 until May 2018, then moved to MTV3 in January 2019.

Uutisvuoto mainly follows the same format as Have I Got News For You. The guests are usually celebrities, and frequently politicians. In two presidential elections, both of the second-round candidates appeared as guests: to-be-president Tarja Halonen and Esko Aho in 2000, and president Halonen and Sauli Niinistö in 2006. Winning the show correlated with winning the election contest itself in both instances. In 2006, the "presidential show" broke all viewing records when it was watched by 1.4 million viewers (in a country of 5.2 million).

The show was so popular in Finland that it was even parodied in the Aku Ankka (Finnish for Donald Duck) comic book as Uutiskuono (news muzzle/snout).

Peter Nyman's catchphrase "Haluatteko lukea hyvän vitsin jonka kuulin äsken Yleisradion kahvilassa?" ("Do you want to read a good joke which I just heard in Yleisradio's cafeteria?") is the show's running gag. Ignoring all answers, continues: "Ei se mitään, kerron sen silti." ("Doesn't matter, I'll tell it anyway.") The show later became the title of Nyman's joke book. (ISBN 951-0-29690-2)

Peter Nyman left in 2010 after jumping ship to MTV3, and was replaced by Baba Lybeck. When the show swapped to MTV3 in 2019, Nyman returned, yet the show was axed at the end of that year.

== Presenters and panellists ==
The host of Uutisvuoto was originally Peter Nyman. In 2010, journalist Baba Lybeck took over. Novelist Jari Tervo was one of the permanent team captains for the entire history of the show until 2017. His pair was originally poet Tommy Tabermann, who resigned after being elected to the Finnish parliament in 2006. Tabermann was eventually replaced by comedian Stan Saanila until 2017 - after he and Tervo left, their roles were filled by guest panellists until the show transferred to MTV3. Both teams also included a weekly guest member, often a politician or a journalist.

Saanila returned for the final series in late 2019.

Presenter	21 February 1998 – 2 December 2006	25 August 2007 – 12 May 2010	25 September 2010 – 3 June 2017	5 January – 4 May 2019	10 September – 12 November 2019
Peter Nyman					
Baba Lybeck					
Jari Tervo					
Tommy Tabermann					
Stan Saanila					
Reeta Räty					
Ile Uusivuori					
