= Jone Nikula =

Finnish broadcaster and journalist

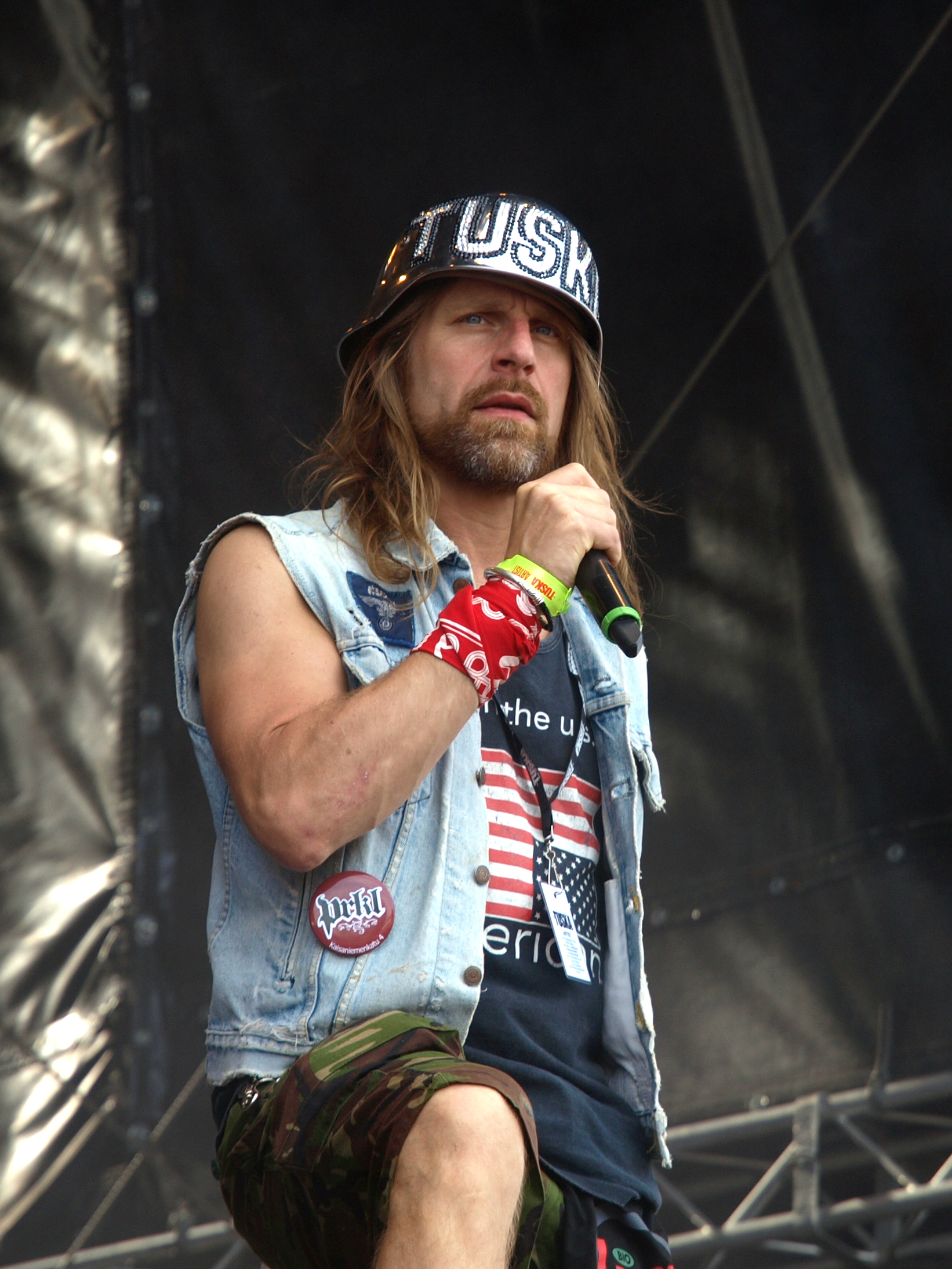
Jone Nikula at Tuska Open Air 2013

Antti Joonas "Jone" Nikula (born 30 March 1970) is a Finnish television and radio personality and a jack-of-all-trades in the music industry. He became well known as a judge in the TV show Idols.

Before his TV popularity, Nikula has – among other things – been a host on the Finnish radio station Radio City, and marketing manager of EMI Music Finland. Since 2007, Nikula and Kotiteollisuus frontman Jouni Hynynen have hosted Äijät, a TV show about the professions and (in the second season in 2008) hobbies of "real men". He has written a history book about Finnish heavy metal music, Rauta-aika (Iron Age), and worked as the tour manager of Finnish glam rock band Hanoi Rocks. Starting early 2007, he has been hosting evening and daytime shows on Nelonen Media's rock music radio station, Radio Rock.

== Private life ==
Nikula's military rank is Captain in reserve in the Finnish Defence Forces. His father Paavo Nikula is the former Chancellor of Justice of Finland. His mother Riitta Nikula is a professor of art history. Stuba Nikula, his brother, is the head of the Finnish Film Foundation.

Nikula is married to dancer Hanna Karttunen. His previous engagement was with television host Ellen Jokikunnas.

In 2006, Nikula competed in the first season of the finnish TV-series Dancing with the Stars, coming in third place. Later in 2010 he would return as a judge for the series' fifth season.
