= Peter Nyman =

Finnish journalist

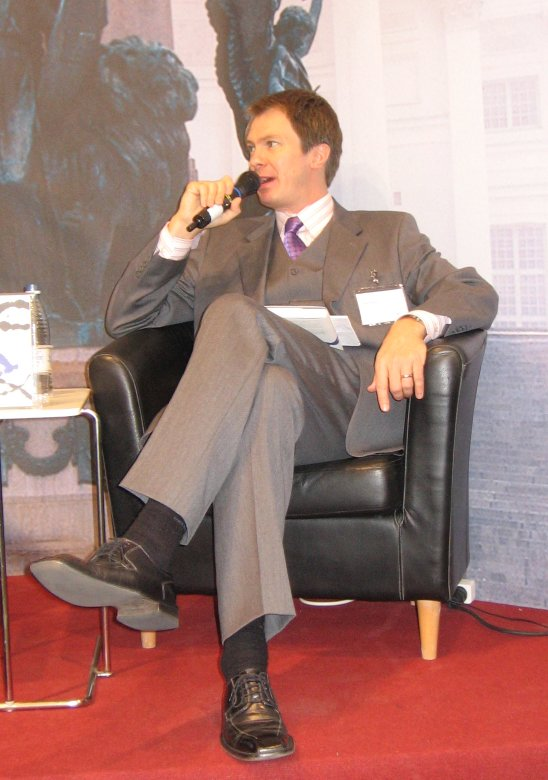
Peter Nyman at the Helsinki Book Fair in 2007

Peter Rafael Nyman (born 27 September 1966 in Helsinki) is a Finnish journalist and television reporter. He was the presenter of TV programme Uutisvuoto from the show's start in 1998 until 2010, then returned as said presenter in 2019. He also hosted Premier league studio in Canal+ (now C More). Before Uutisvuoto, Nyman was known as a host of Mediapeli.

Nyman was educated at the Svenska social- och kommunalhögskolan of the University of Helsinki, receiving a Master of Political Sciences degree in 2010.

In his 2007 book Ankkalammikko ('Duck Pond'), he discusses belonging to the Swedish-speaking minority in Finland.

== Written works ==
- Haluatteko lukea hyvän vitsin, jonka kuulin äsken Yleisradion kahvilassa?. Helsinki: WSOY. 2004. ISBN 978-951-0-29690-5.
- Ankkalammikko. Helsinki: WSOY. 2007. ISBN 978-951-0-31236-0.
