= Baba Lybeck =

Finnish journalist

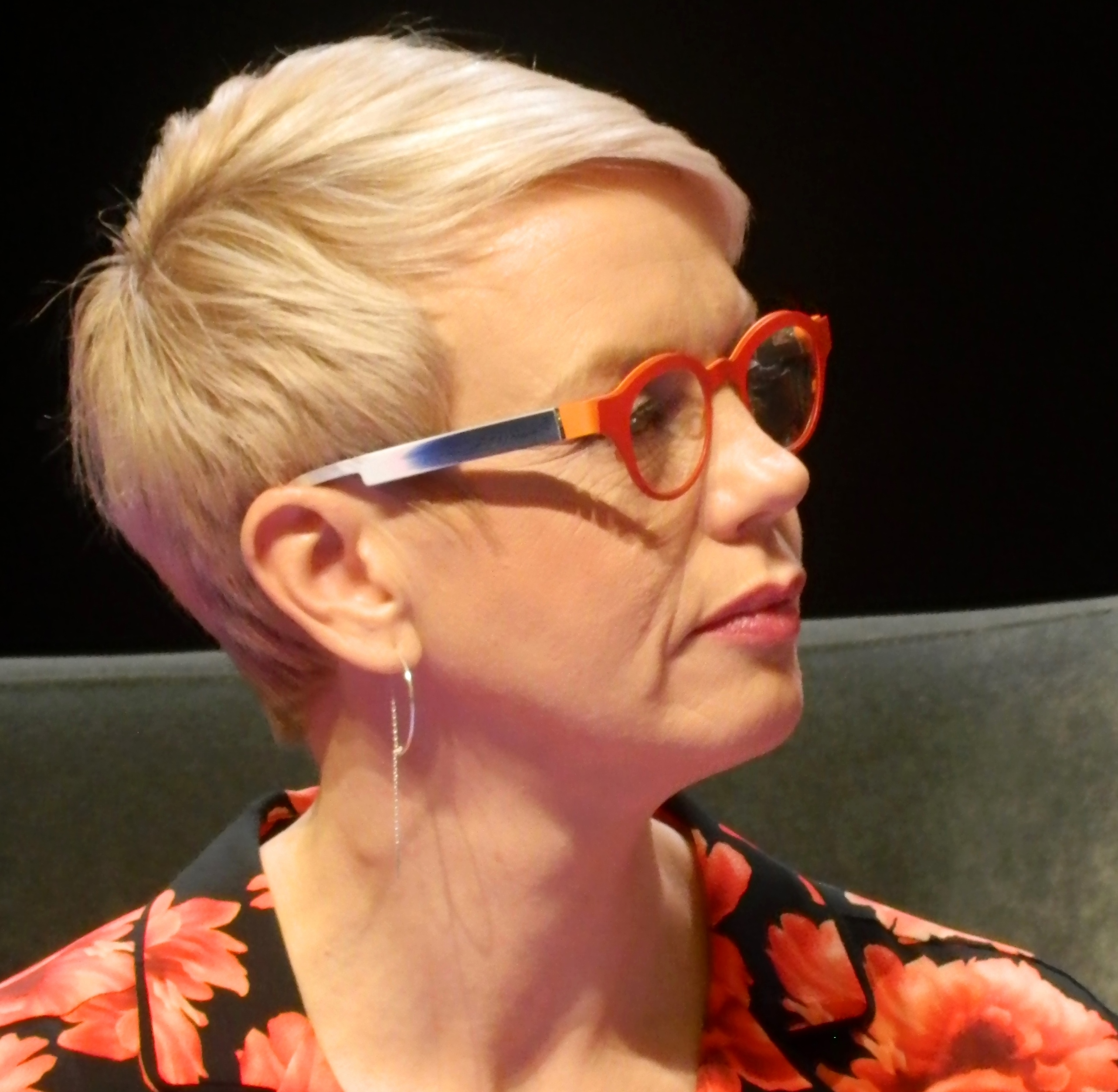
Baba Lybeck

Barbara "Baba" Lybeck (born 26 December 1966 in Pargas) is a Finnish journalist. She has a Master's degree in literature. She has worked as a news presenter for the Finnish TV channel Nelonen from 1998. Lybeck quit presenting news in 2009 and moved to Yleisradio to work as a journalist.

She has worked as the presenter and chief judge of the quiz show Uutisvuoto since autumn 2010 after Peter Nyman moved to MTV3 to work as a news presenter. Previously Lybeck has worked at Radio City and presented the NO TV show on MTV3, as well as the Finnish Top 40 music show on YLE and the Swedish language shows Bosses Bio and Talking Heads on FST. Lybeck was also present in the TV show Viemäri-TV.

Baba Lybeck's grandparents were author Tito Colliander and artist Ina Colliander.
