= Nicke Widyawati =

Indonesian businesswoman

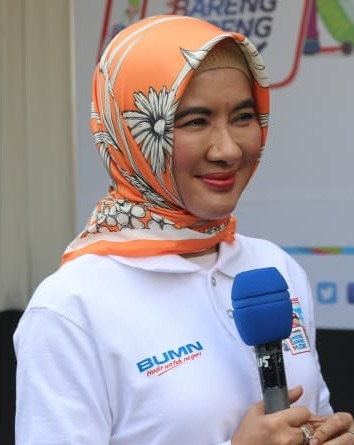

15th CEO Pertamina
- In office 30 August 2018 – 4 November 2024
- President: Joko Widodo; Prabowo Subianto
- Preceded by: Elia Massa Manik
- Succeeded by: Simon Aloysius Mantiri

Personal details
- Born: December 25, 1967 (age 58) Tasikmalaya, Jawa Barat, Indonesia
- Spouse: Fitriyansyah
- Children: Muhammad Alif Fakhri (b. 1997 d. 2005)
- Education: Bandung Institute of Technology; Padjadjaran University

Nicke Widyawati (born December 25, 1967) is an Indonesian businesswoman who has been the President Director of Pertamina since August 30, 2018, after previously being the acting President Director replacing Elia Massa Manik. She received the Women's Work of Female Grace award from the Indonesia Asia Institute in 2013. She has been named by Fortune magazine as one of the most powerful women outside the US in 2020. She ranks 16th on the annual list. "An engineer by training, Widyawati was made Pertamina's chief in 2018 after her predecessor, Elia Massa, was dismissed amid restructuring efforts", Fortune stated on October 22, 2020. In 2023, Nicke ranked 51st in Forbes list of "World's 100 most powerful women" and 67th on Fortune's list of Most Powerful Women

== Education ==
Widyawati is an alumnus of SMA Negeri 1 Tasikmalaya. After that she studied at the Bandung Institute of Technology majoring in industrial engineering and graduated in 1991. She also continued her postgraduate education at Padjajaran University majoring in business law and graduated in 2009.

== Career ==
Widyawati started working at the age of 21, while still undergoing undergraduate education at the Bandung branch of Bank Duta. After that she had worked at PT. Industrial Engineering. She is involved in several projects in collaboration with Pupuk Sriwijaya in Palembang, Lhokseumawe, Cilegon and Malaysia. Then, she joined Mega Eltra, a state-owned enterprise engaged in electricity and became the company's chief director. After joining Mega Eltra, she was drawn to PLN as Director of Strategic Procurement I in 2014. In 2017, she began her career at Pertamina as Director of Human Resources and acting as Director of Logistics, Supply Chain and Infrastructure. After only a few months in office, she was made the acting President Director and concurrently Human Resources Director following the removal of 5 Pertamina directors led by president director Elia Massa Manik regarding policies that are considered detrimental to the domestic oil and gas sector.
