= Antti Asplund =

Finnish fashion designer and artist

- Born: 4 December 1981; Oulu, Finland
- Occupation: Fashion designer
- Labels: Antti Asplund; HETEROPHOBIA
- Website: www.anttiasplund.com

Antti Asplund is a Finnish fashion designer and artist. He has lived in Helsinki since 2000, and has designed clothes under his eponymous label since 2007.

Asplund studied both general linguistics and fashion, but dropped out to work under his own name.

== Fashion collections ==
Antti Asplund has designed several fashion collections since 2006. His designs often have a dramatic and romantic approach. Along with his first collection, 'The Funeral Dresses', Asplund introduced his hallmark, the cross necklace, which is based on the Greek cross.

Asplund has designed one children's fashion collection, 'Crying Kids', in 2012. The 'Goombas' collection was inspired by the Super Mario Bros. video game.

In 2014, Asplund designed a small fashion collection titled 'Heterophobia' for the Helsinki Pride festivities, where the products were quickly sold out. The collection generated a lot of interest in social media, and Asplund was invited to the Berlin Fashion Week in July 2014. The collection was expanded to include 200 pieces of clothing, creating a political streetwear collection, carrying the slogan 'no fear of different – we are all equal'. Asplund has been promoting the collection in several countries, also in North America during the Vancouver, New York (part of Mercedes-Benz Fashion Week) and Los Angeles Fashion Weeks. The collection was part of Tokyo's Rooms30 fashion fair in February 2015 and has been featured in the British Vogue and Glamour magazines.

The 'Heterophobia Whiteline' collection and a webshop showcasing the 'Heterophobia' collection were launched in connection with Helsinki Pride 2015.

The 'Échec' collection, presented at Potsdam Now for the Berlin Fashion Week in January 2015, is the first chapter of Come Back To Dark, a visual project which Asplund has created together with the photographer Andre Pozusis.

=== Antti Asplund collections ===
- The Funeral Dresses (Autumn/Winter 2006–07)
- Goombas (Spring/Summer 2007)
- Lines (Autumn/Winter 2007–08)
- Poisongardens (Spring/Summer 2008)
- Vapour Eggs (Autumn/Winter 2008–09)
- Frivolous Women (Spring/Summer 2009)
- On the Pond (Autumn/Winter 2009–10)
- Sleep Together (Spring/Summer 2010)
- Clinging (Autumn/Winter 2010–11)
- There (Spring/Summer 2011)
- I Can't Play Violin (Autumn/Winter 2011–12)
- Crying Kids (2012)
- Échec (Autumn/Winter 2015–16)

=== Heterophobia collections ===
- HETEROPHOBIA (Summer 2014)
- HETEROPHOBIA Sailors Worldwide (Spring/Summer 2015)
- HETEROPHOBIA Whiteline (Summer 2015)
- HETEROPHOBIA Winterwar (Autumn/Winter 2015–16)
- HETEROPHOBIA Award Winners (Spring/Summer 2016)

=== Other designs ===
- Charlottes by the Floodlights (2010) – a Lotta Svärd inspired collection for Suomen Pukutehdas

== Other work ==
Asplund participated in the reality television series Muodin huipulle (the Finnish version of Project Runway) in 2009.

Asplund has been writing his first book, the partly autobiographical novel titled Musta peili ("The black mirror"), during ten years. In the autumn of 2014, he finished writing the book.

In 2007, Asplund opened his first boutique in Helsinki. Between 2007 and 2012, he has had several boutiques with different names. Asplund's apparel has also been seen in the Stockholm Fashion Week in 2008, after which his clothes were sold in Sweden and Japan. Currently Asplund has a showroom called Darkroom in the Helsinki design district.

Asplund is also a recording artist. His debut single 'Gum' with its accompanying music video was released in 2014 and is written about safe-sex. In 2016, Asplund released the song 'Raving good' using his artist name Jester. He has also worked as a DJ and a presenter on several events.

In 2016, Asplund is featured in the biographical photo book 30 Fates of Finland by Rikhard Larvanto.

Asplund hosted the park party in Helsinki Pride in 2018.
