= Jethro Rostedt =

Finnish businessman (born 1976)

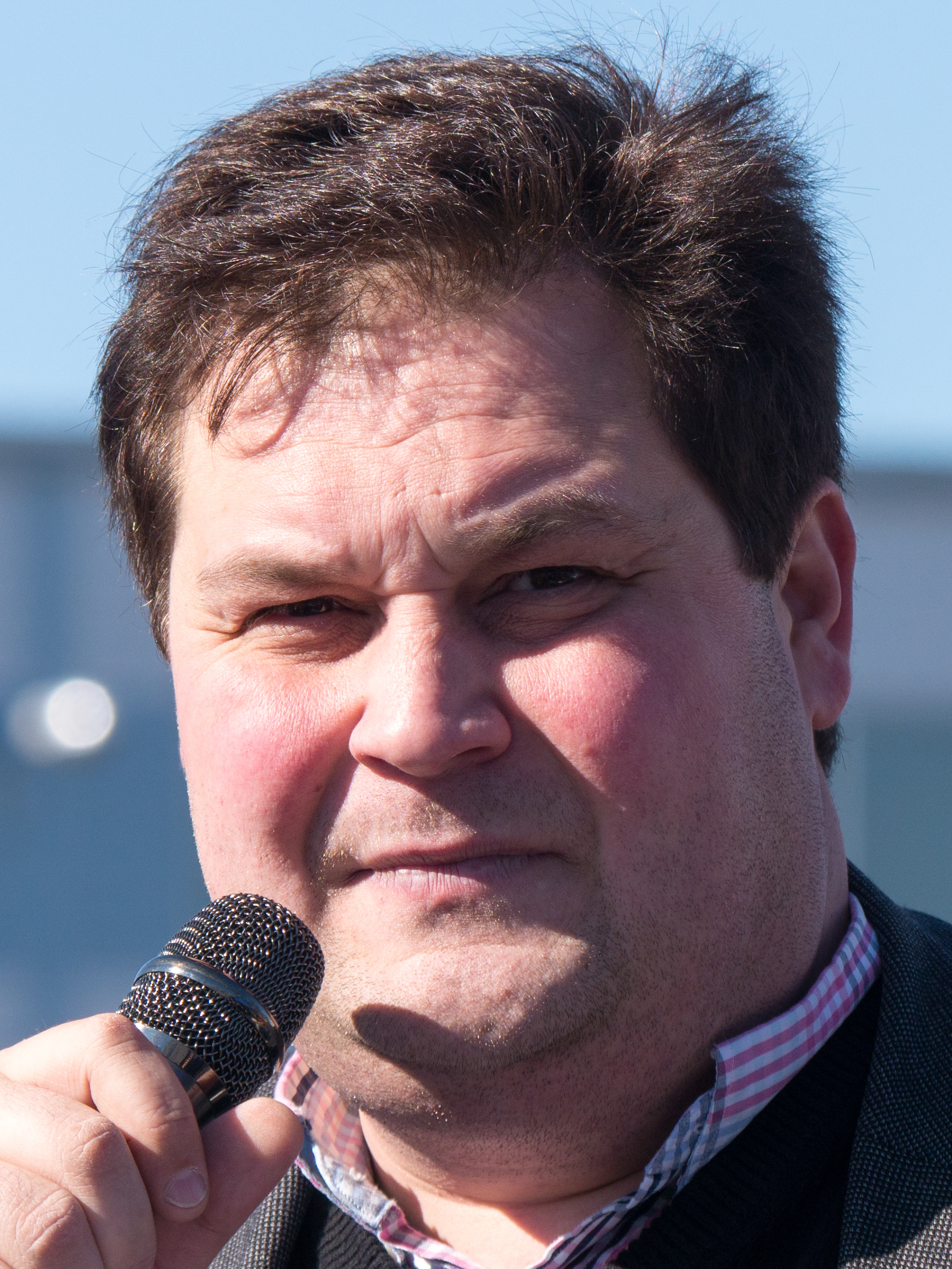
- Rostedt in 2013
- Born: 17 March 1976 (age 49); Turku, Finland
- Occupations: real estate agent; businessman
- Spouse: Henna Virtanen (m. 1998)
- Children: 2

Jethro Juuso Rostedt (born 17 March 1976) is a Finnish real estate agent, businessman and former city councilor of Turku. He has been involved in several television programs, the first of which was the reality TV program Diili (Finnish version of The Apprentice) in the fall of 2009.

Rostedt was elected to the Turku City Council after the 2017 municipal elections. He represented the National Coalition Party there until August 2018, when he became a representative of the Movement Now party, but has asked to resign from the council in November 2022 because he is moving away from Turku. He was his party's candidate for mayor of Turku in the spring 2021 municipal elections. Rostedt was the chairman of the Turku local association of Movement Now.

In September 2025, Rostedt was sentenced to suspended imprisonment and community service by the District Court of Southwest Finland for tax fraud.
