= Kalle Lindroth =

Finnish musician, actor, and television host

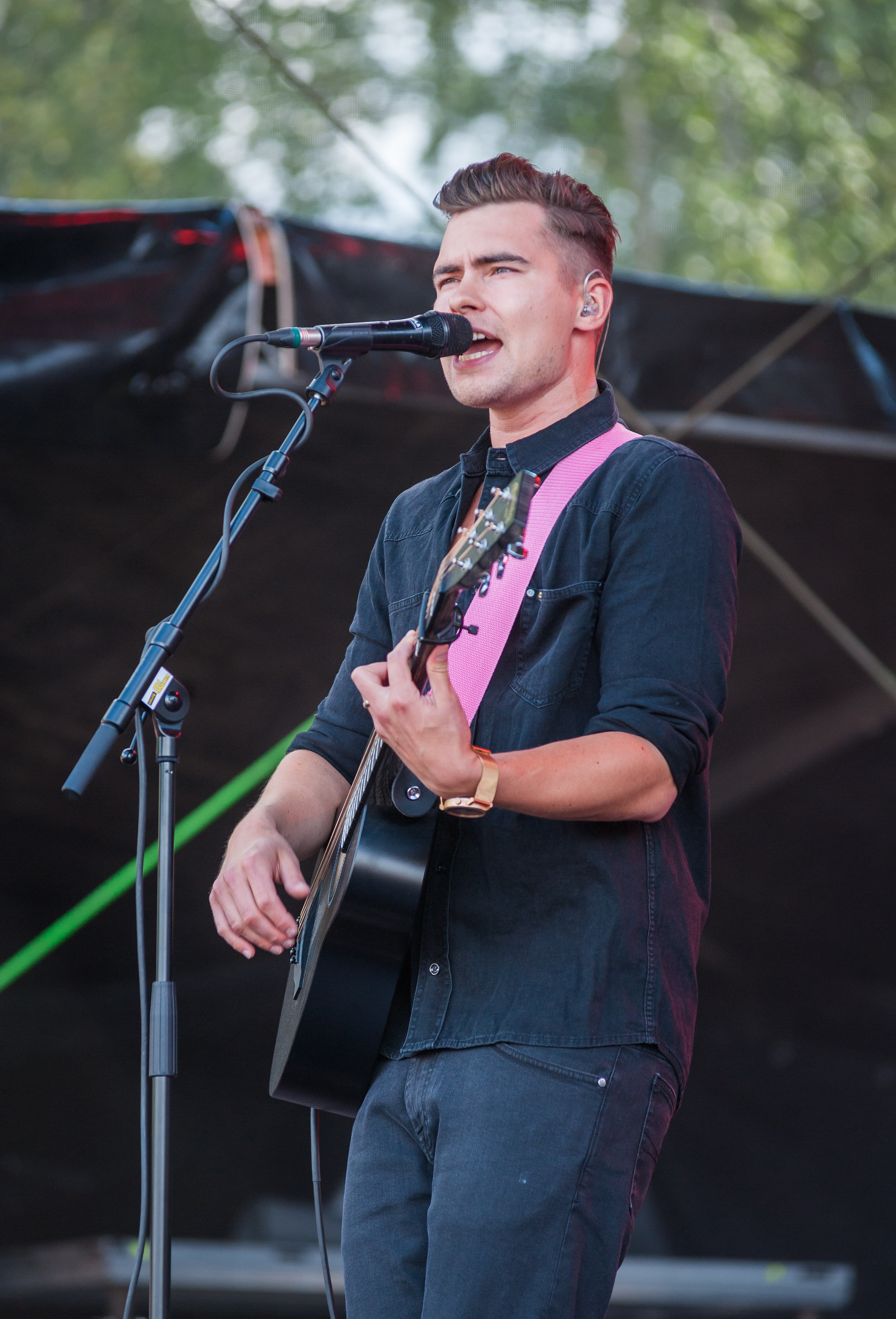
Lindroth in 2018

Kalle Lindroth (born 3 August 1989 in Helsinki) is a Finnish musician, actor and television host. He is the lead singer of the rock band Smak, formed in 2001. As an actor Lindroth appeared in the television series Kotikatu, and as a host in Summeri and Bumtsibum.

== Selected discography ==
=== Albums with Smak ===
| Year | Title | Peak position |
| Year | Title | FIN |
|---|---|---|
| 2004 | Sic Transit | 16 |
| 2006 | Elohopeaa | 9 |
| 2009 | Shopping Mall Religion | 21 |

=== Singles ===
| Year | Title | Peak position |
| Year | Title | FIN |
|---|---|---|
| 2014 | "Annika" | – |
| 2016 | "Hakuammuntaa" (with Ida Paul) | – |
| 2016 | "Parvekkeella" (with Ida Paul) | 10 |
| 2017 | "Kun tää loppuu" (with Ida Paul) | – |
| 2017 | "Kupla" (with Ida Paul) | 17 |
| 2017 | "Päällekkäin" (with Ida Paul) | 16 |
| 2018 | "Planeetat" (with Ida Paul) | 12 |
| 2020 | "Päiväuni" (with Ida Paul) | 11 |
| 2022 | "Mä mietin sua" (with Ida Paul) | 9 |
| 2022 | "Autiomaa" (with Ida Paul) | 13 |
