= Kristiina Halttu =

Finnish actress

- Halttu in 2000
- Born: 7 June 1963 (age 62); Kuivaniemi, Finland

Kristiina Halttu (born 7 June 1963 in Kuivaniemi, Finland) is a Finnish actress.

Halttu began her career in acting in 1991 appearing recently in the 2006 film Saippuaprinssi in which she worked with actors such as Mikko Leppilampi, Pamela Tola and Teijo Eloranta.

Halttu is the Finnish voice actor of Mrs Fillyjonk in the Finnish-British animated television family drama Moominvalley (2019–). She played Taina Henttunen in the Finnish TV series Bordertown.
