= Mert Otsamo =

Finnish fashion designer (born 1990)

- Born: 3 September 1990 (age 35); Oulu, Finland
- Occupation: Fashion designer

Mert Otsamo (born 3 September 1990) is a Finnish fashion designer.

Otsamo was born in Oulu. His heritage lies in the Finnish Northern Ostrobothnia and Turkey (as his father is Turkish), and from an early age he began making clothes inspired by cartoons and video games. His childhood passion offered an escape from the dramatic challenges and adversity he faced growing up. His upbringing and constant reflection upon the fragility of life has served as a foundation for his work.

Otsamo's first independent collection embodied his signature style, consisting of intriguing sculptural pieces. The collection was well received and selected styles were made available for purchase in various concept stores in Finland. The collections that followed have gradually evolved towards a more specialized pattern-making and tailoring which has further distinguished his label and unique approach to design.

In 2009, Otsamo appeared on MTV3's Project Runway and finished third.

In Autumn of 2013 Otsamo was also a contestant on Dancing with the Stars.
