= Marco Bjurström =

Finnish dance instructor and television presenter

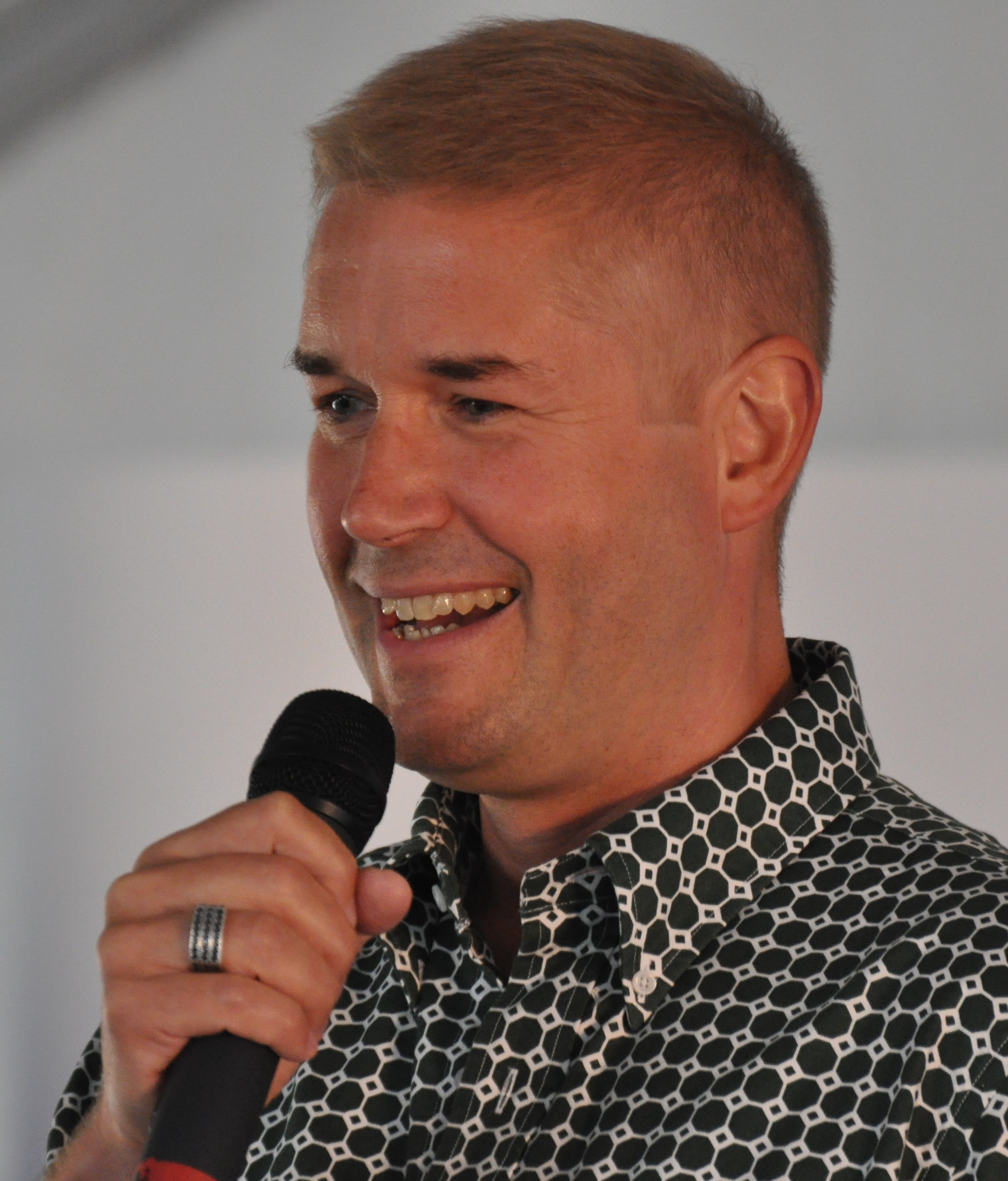
Marco Bjurström in 2013.

Marco Robert Bjurström is a Finnish dance instructor, director, choreographer, television host, and news anchor. He is best known as the host of the television game show BumtsiBum! (1997–2005).

== Career ==
Bjurström is best known as the host of the television game show BumtsiBum! (1997–2005), which was ultimately based on the Irish The Lyrics Board and was watched by more than a million people weekly.

He has also directed the Finnish versions of three musical stage productions for the Peacock Theatre at Linnanmäki – Grease (2002), Hair (2003), and Saturday Night Fever (2004). Bjurström also hosted the Finnish version of Dancing with the Stars from 2006 to 2009 with Ella Kanninen (2006–2007), Vanessa Kurri (2008) and Vappu Pimiä (2009).

In February 2010 it was announced that Bjurström would be replaced by actor Mikko Leppilampi, as Bjurström was appointed head judge of Dance Suomi, the Finnish version of So You Think You Can Dance.

Bjurström has also hosted several ceremonies, including the election celebration of President of Finland Tarja Halonen.

== Recognition and awards ==
Bjurström has been awarded the best male TV performer Telvis four times: in 1997, 1998, 1999, and 2000. His game show BumtsiBum! was also awarded three Venlas in 1997–1998.

== Personal life ==
His husband is Peter Pihlström.
