= Anu Sinisalo =

Finnish actress (born 1966)

- Born: 3 March 1966 (age 60); Helsinki, Finland
- Occupation: Actress
- Years active: 1994–present

Anu Sinisalo (born 3 March 1966) is a Finnish actress. She has acted in drama television series as well as in films.

She won Best Actress of the year at the annual Finnish Golden Venla TV awards for her role in TV drama Bordertown as Detective Constable Lena Jaakkola. By following her acting in various roles, it can be noted that Sinisalo speaks at least four languages fluently: Finnish, Russian, Swedish, and English.

== Partial filmography ==
=== Film ===
- Kulkurin taivas (1998)
- Nattflykt (1999)
- Taivasmatka (2001)
- Kymmenen riivinrautaa (2002)
- Reunion 2: The Bachelor Party (2016)
- Finders of the Lost Yacht (2021)

=== Television ===
- Ottaako sydämestä? (1995)
- Rapman (1995)
- Samppanjaa ja vaahtokarkkeja (1995–1997)
- Rakkauden tanssi (1998)
- Tuliportaat (1998)
- Klubi (TV series) (1998–1999)
- Kaverille ei jätetä (2001–2003)
- Paholaisen tytär (2002)
- Operation Stella Polaris (2003)
- Akkaa päälle (2006)
- Uudisraivaaja (2006)
- Salatut elämät (2006) – Anna-Maija Halonen
- Easy Living (Helppo elämä, 2009–2011)
- Bordertown (Sorjonen, 2018–2019) – Lena Jaakkola
