= Janna Hurmerinta =

Janna Hurmerinta (Janna)
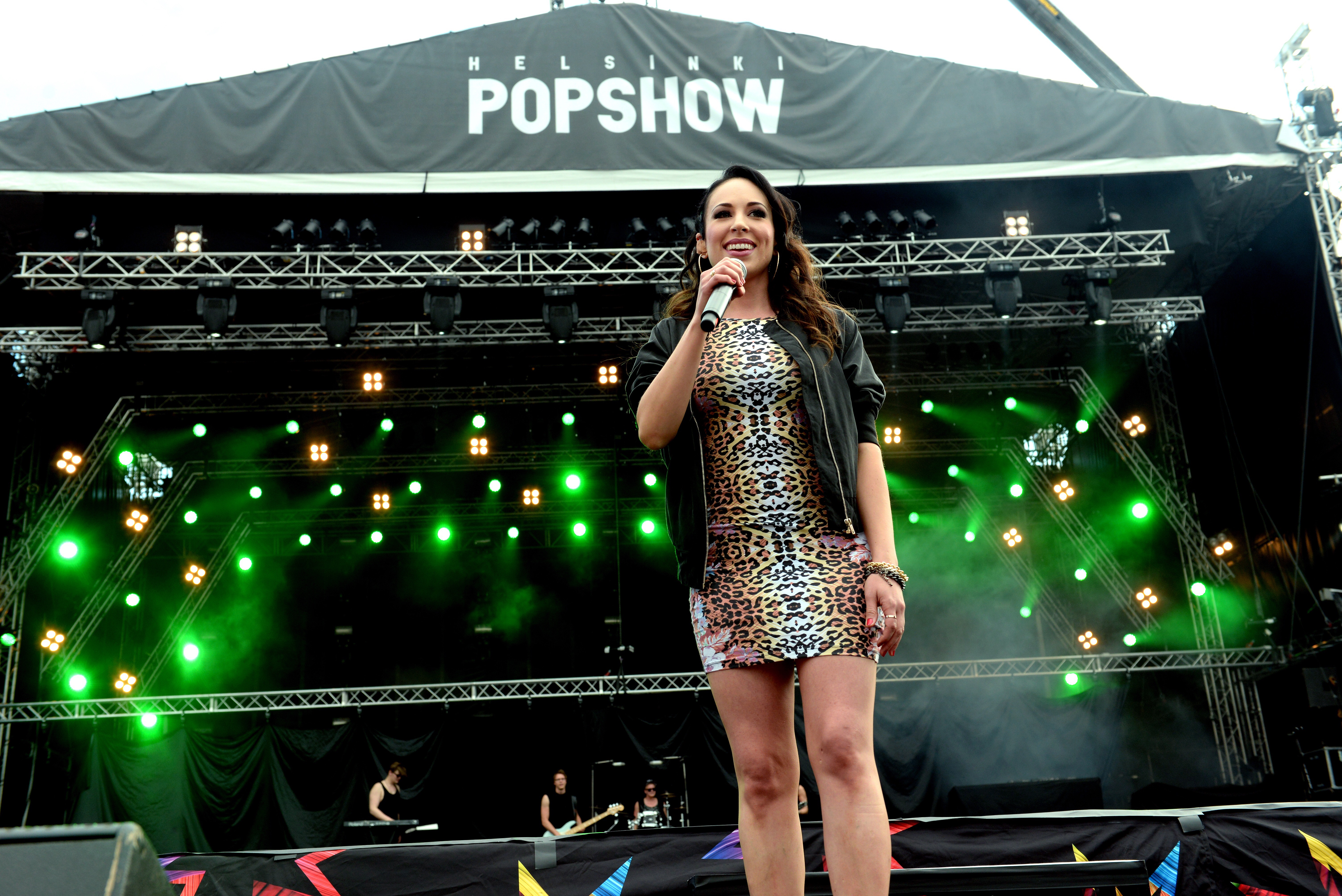
- Janna in 2014 Helsinki Pop Show

Background information
- Also known as: Janna
- Born: Janna–Mari Hurmerinta; 20 December 1981 (age 44); Helsinki, Finland
- Genres: Pop
- Years active: 2007–present
- Labels: Texicalli Records / Jupiter; Universal Music (2013–)

Janna–Mari Hurmerinta (born 20 December 1981), better known by her mononym Janna, is a Finnish R&B, and pop singer, songwriter and pianist. Her debut album Right Now was released in June 2007 to critical acclaim. followed by The Makings of Me in 2008. In 2013, she was signed to Universal Music Finland. Her self-titled album Janna topped the Finnish album chart in June 2014.

== Discography ==
=== Albums ===
Title	Album details	Peak position
Title	Album details	FIN
Right Now	Release date: 20 June 2007 (Finland) 10 October 2007 (Asia); Record label: Texicalli / Jupiter; Formats: CD, digital download	–
The Makings of Me	Release date: 19 November 2008; Record label: Texicalli / Jupiter; Formats: CD, digital download	–
Janna	Release date: June 2014; Record label: Universal Music; Formats: CD, digital download	1
Spektri	Release date: 28 September 2018; Record label: Universal Music; Formats: CD, digital download	6
Ihminen	Release date: 30 August 2024; Record label: Universal Music; Formats: CD, digital download	8

=== Singles ===
Year	Single	Peak positions	Album
Year	Single	FIN	Album
2013	"Sä et ole hullu" (You're Not Mad)	2	Janna
2014	"Läpinäkyvä" (Transparent)	–	Janna
2014	"Tytöt lähtee tanssimaan" (The Girls Leave to Dance)	–	Janna
2016	"Paljon Onnee"	–	
2016	"Anna mä puhallan"	–	
2017	"Vaikee mut oikee" (featuring Nikke Ankara)	17	
2018	"Mustis" (featuring Pyhimys)	20	

Featured in

Year	Single	Peak positions	Album
Year	Single	FIN	Album
2013	"Kuuluuks" (Juno featuring Janna & Gracias)	2	–
