= Jari Tervo =

Finnish author (born 1959)

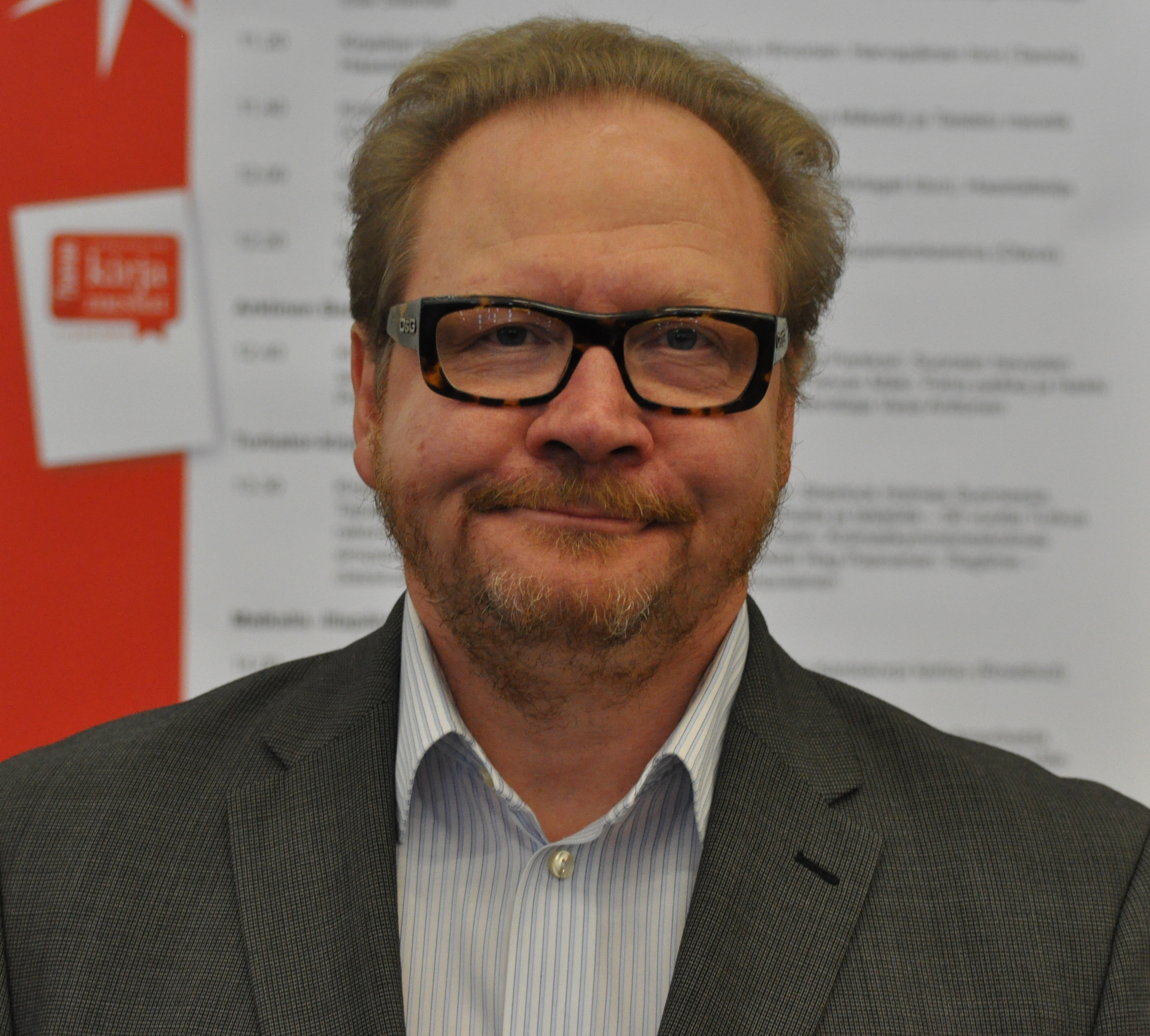
- Jari Tervo at the Turku Book Fair 2010.
- Born: 2 February 1959 (age 67); Rovaniemi, Finland
- Occupation: Novelist
- Writing career
- Genres: Prose, Poetry

Jari Tervo (born 2 February 1959) is a Finnish author, columnist, and former TV personality. He is a major name in Finnish literature.

== Writing ==
Tervo mainly writes traditional plot-driven prose fiction, in genres ranging from comedy (Poliisin poika) to detective fiction (Myyrä). His works often include autobiographical elements; for example, Kallellaan is a diary, and Minun sukuni tarina has a protagonist who is the author himself, all but in name. Despite his renown in Finland, only one of his novels has been translated into English: Pyhiesi Yhteyteen, translated as Among the Saints in 2014.. Tervo has also written books of poetry, as well as newspaper columns for Yle Uutiset, Helsingin Sanomat, and Iltalehti, among other publications.

He was given the Veijo Meri Award in 2018.

Tervo was published by WSOY until 2016, but followed his editor, Harri Haanpää, to Otava.

== Television ==
Tervo was a team captain on Uutisvuoto, a Finnish television panel show based on the BBC's Have I Got News For You, from its debut in 1998 until he quit the show in 2017.

== Personal life ==
Tervo is married to the writer Kati Tervo.

== Novels ==
- Pohjan hovi, 1992 (The Court of the North)
- Poliisin poika, 1993 (Policeman's Son)
- Pyhiesi yhteyteen, 1995, published in English as Among the Saints in 2014
- Tuulikaappimaa, 1997 (Windswept Expanse)
- Minun sukuni tarina, 1999 (My Family Chronicle)
- Kallellaan, 2000
- Suomemme heimo, 2001
- Rautapää, 2002
- Myyrä, 2004 (The Mole)
- Ohrana, 2006
- Troikka, 2008
- Koljatti, 2009
- Layla, 2011
- Jarrusukka, 2013
- Esikoinen, 2013
- Revontultentie, 2014
- Pyrstötähti, 2015
- Matriarkka, 2016
- Aamen, 2018
- Pääskyt talvehtivat järven pohjassa, 2021

== Short story collections ==
- Siat ja naudat, 1994
- Taksirengin rakkaus, 1998
- Siperian tango: Valitut novellit, 1993–2003, 2003

== Poetry ==
- Tuulen keinutuoli, 1980
- Sillankorvassa, illansuussa, 1983
- Kaistan taivasta, 1988
- Muistoja Pohjolasta, 1990
- Intialainen lippalakki: Valitut runot, 1978–90, 1999

== Non-fiction ==
- Loiri, 2019
- Ukko, with Kati Tervo, 2022
