= Nicke Lignell =

Finnish actor (born 1966)

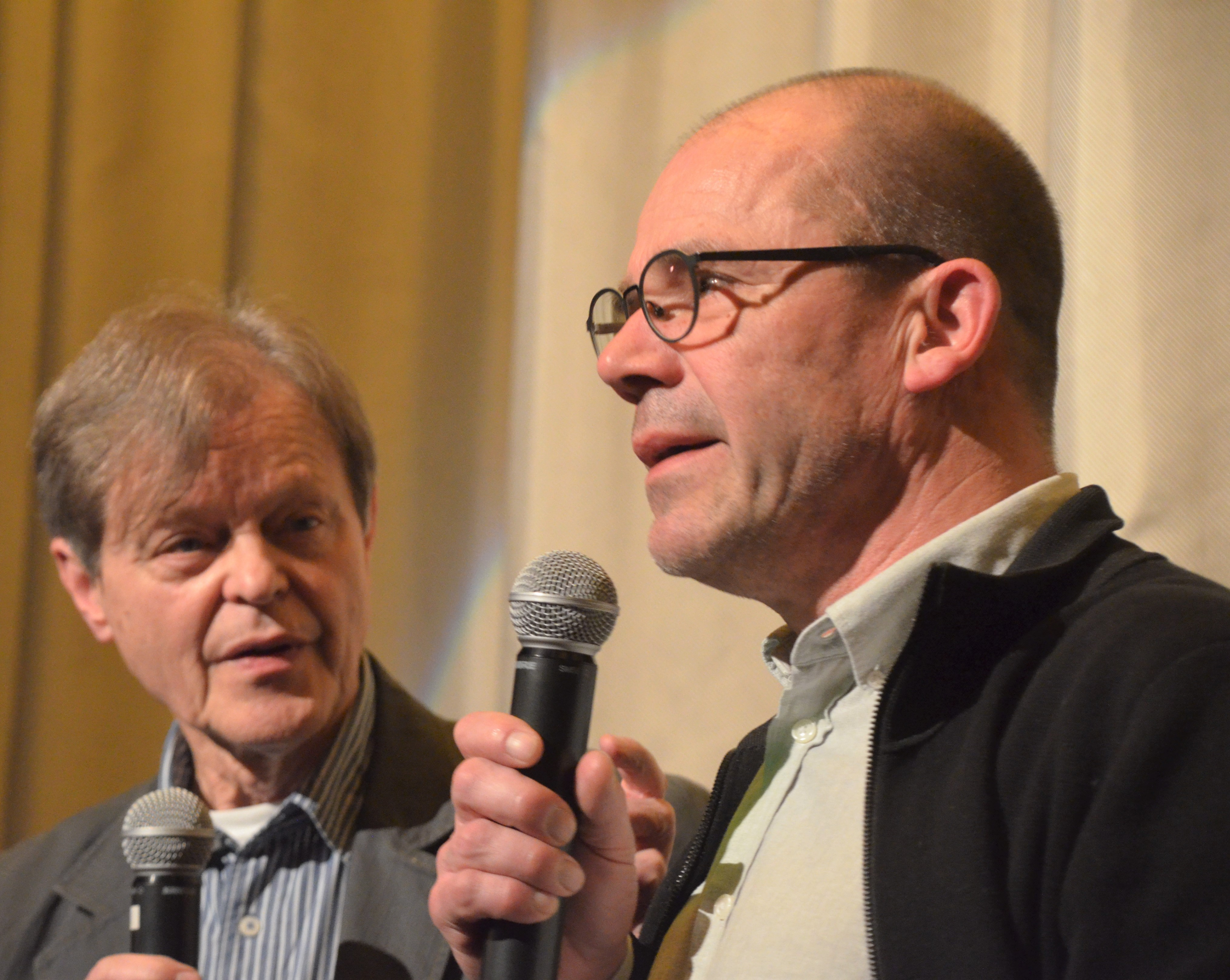
- Nicke Lignell (right) with the filmmaker Claes Olsson in 2022.
- Born: 24 June 1966 (age 59); Bromarv, Finland

Niclas Christoffer “Nicke” Lignell (born 24 June 1966 in Bromarv, Southern Finland) is a Finnish actor, who has appeared in many TV shows and movies. In addition to his acting career, he writes a regular column for the Finnish newspaper Iltalehti and does voiceovers. His wife, the violinist Raakel Lignell, is also a celebrity in her own right. Together they have 5 children.

On 30 December 2006, the car Lignell and his mother were travelling in was hit in Ekenäs by a drunk driver who blew 0.241% on a breathalyzer test. After being cut out of the car he was driving, Lignell was whisked away to Töölö Hospital in Helsinki for surgery along with the drunk driver. Lignell was then put in the ICU to recover from a skull fracture and cerebral hemorrhage.

Lignell hosted "Fiksumpi kuin koululainen" (Smarter than a school kid), the Finnish version of Are You Smarter Than a 5th Grader? quiz show.

== Filmography ==
- Party
- Fem skott i senaten (Five shots in the Senate)
- Akvaariorakkaus (Love in a Fish Bowl)
- Ihmeidentekijät
- Kotikatu
- Underbara kvinnor vid vatten (Amazing Women by the Sea)
- Saari
- Team Ahma
- Parhaat vuodet
- Lovers & Leavers (Kuutamolla)
- Addiction (Levottomat 3)
- Käenpesä
- Onnen varjot
- Voitto kotiin (TV show)
- Fiksumpi kuin koululainen
- Roba
- Syke (2014)
