= Olivia (magazine) =

Finnish women's magazine

- Categories: Fashion, women's magazine
- Frequency: Monthly
- Circulation: 36,389 (2013)
- Publisher: Aller Media Oy
- First issue: 2007; 19 years ago
- Company: Aller Media
- Country: Finland
- Language: Finnish
- Website: Olivia

Olivia is a monthly Finnish women's magazine published in Finland.

== History and profile ==
Olivia was established by Bonnier Group in 2007. The magazine was part of the Group until February 2014 when it was acquired by Aller Media. Following the transaction the publisher of the magazine became Aller Media Oy.

The magazine is published on a monthly basis and focuses on career, family, home, and fashion. Olivia has editions in Finnish, English, and Swedish along with other minority languages. Due to media monopolies, such as SBS Finland, very few national magazines last as long as Olivia in Finland. Mari Paalosalo-Jussinmäki was the editor-in-chief of the magazine.

The 2011 circulation of Olivia was 43,250 copies. The magazine had a circulation of 36,389 copies in 2013.
