= Bufo (company) =

Finnish film production company

- Industry: Motion Picture
- Founded: 2007
- Headquarters: Helsinki, Finland
- Key people: Mark Lwoff, Misha Jaari, Vesa Virtanen, Helena Mielonen
- Products: Film
- Website: http://www.bufo.fi/

Bufo is a Finnish film production company established in 2007 by the producers Mark Lwoff and Misha Jaari, and the scriptwriter Vesa Virtanen.

The company has produced several feature and documentary films, including The Good Son (2011) by Zaida Bergroth, The Interrogation (2009) by Jörn Donner and Concrete Night directed by Pirjo Honkasalo and based on the novel of the same name by Pirkko Saisio. The film was premiered in January 2017.

Bufo's films Concrete Night and Void have won the Jussi Award for Best Film .

The Bufo Group also includes the film distribution company B-Plan Distribution Oy , which has distributed mostly domestic films to cinemas.
