= Finland in the Eurovision Song Contest 2023 =

- Eurovision Song Contest 2023
- Participating broadcaster: Yleisradio (Yle)
- Country: Finland
- Selection process: Uuden Musiikin Kilpailu 2023
- Selection date: 25 February 2023

Competing entry
- Song: "Cha Cha Cha"
- Artist: Käärijä
- Songwriters: Jere Pöyhönen; Johannes Naukkarinen; Aleksi Nurmi; Jukka Sorsa

Placement
- Semi-final result: Qualified (1st, 177 points)
- Final result: 2nd, 526 points

Participation chronology

Finland was represented at the Eurovision Song Contest 2023 with the song "Cha Cha Cha", written by Jere Pöyhönen, Johannes Naukkarinen, Aleksi Nurmi, and Jukka Sorsa, and performed by Pöyhönen himself under his stage name Käärijä. The Finnish participating broadcaster, Yleisradio (Yle), organised the national final Uuden Musiikin Kilpailu 2023 in order to select its entry for the contest. Seven entries were selected to compete in the national final on 25 February 2023, where the combination of votes from seven international jury groups and votes from the public selected the winner.

Finland was drawn to compete in the first semi-final of the Eurovision Song Contest which took place on 9 May 2023. Performing as the closing entry during the show in position 15, "Cha Cha Cha" was announced among the top 10 entries of the first semi-final and therefore qualified to compete in the final on 14 May. It was later revealed that Finland placed first out of the 15 participating countries in the semi-final with 177 points. In the final, Finland performed in position 13 and placed second out of the 26 participating countries, scoring 526 points.

== Background ==
Prior to the 2023 contest, Yleisradio (Yle) had participated in the Eurovision Song Contest representing Finland fifty-five times since its first entry in 1961. It has won the contest once in 2006 with the song "Hard Rock Hallelujah" performed by Lordi. In 2022, "Jezebel" performed by The Rasmus managed to qualify to the final and placed twenty-first.

As part of its duties as participating broadcaster, Yle organises the selection of its entry in the Eurovision Song Contest and broadcasts the event in the country. The broadcaster confirmed its intentions to participate at the 2023 contest on 23 May 2022. Yle had been selecting its entries for the contest through national final competitions that had varied in format over the years. Between 1961 and 2011, a selection show that was often titled Suomen euroviisukarsinta highlighted that the purpose of the program was to select a song for Eurovision. However, since 2012, the broadcaster had organised the selection show Uuden Musiikin Kilpailu (UMK), which focuses on showcasing new music with the winning song being selected as the Finnish Eurovision entry for that year. Along with its participation confirmation, Yle also announced that it would select its entry for the 2023 contest through Uuden Musiikin Kilpailu 2023.

== Before Eurovision ==
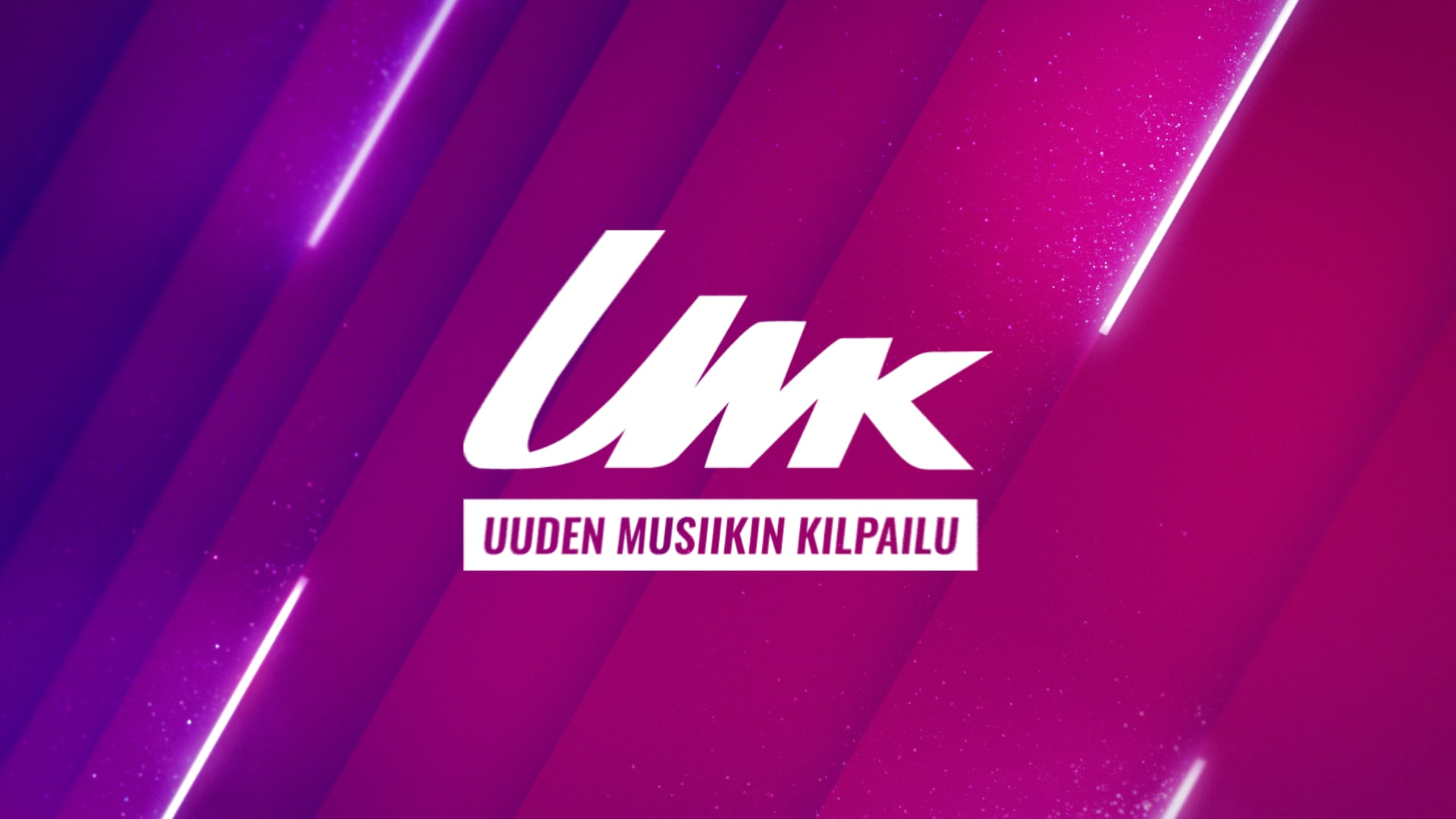
Logo of UMK 2023

=== Uuden Musiikin Kilpailu 2023 ===
Uuden Musiikin Kilpailu 2023 was the twelfth edition of Uuden Musiikin Kilpailu (UMK), the music competition organised by Yle to select its entries for the Eurovision Song Contest. The competition consisted of a final on 25 February 2023, held at Logomo in Turku and hosted by Samu Haber. The show was broadcast on Yle TV1 with a second audio program providing commentary in Finnish by Mikko Silvennoinen, in Swedish by Eva Frantz and Johan Lindroos, in English by Jani Kareinen, in Russian by Levan Tvaltvadze, in Ukrainian by Galyna Sergeyeva, in Finnish Sign Language by Miguel Peltomaa, in Northern Sami by Linda Tammela and in Inari Sami by Heli Huovinen. The competition was also broadcast online at Yle Areena and via radio on YleX, Yle Radio Suomi and with commentary in Swedish on Yle X3M. The competition was watched by 2.1 million viewers in Finland, making it the most watched edition of UMK since its establishment in 2012.

==== Competing entries ====
A submission period was opened by Yle which lasted between 1 September 2022 and 5 September 2022. At least one of the writers and the lead singer(s) had to hold Finnish citizenship or live in Finland permanently in order for the entry to qualify to compete. A panel of nine experts appointed by Yle selected seven entries for the competition from the 363 received submissions. The experts were Tapio Hakanen (Head of Music at YleX), Aija Puurtinen (vocal coach), Amie Borgar (Head of Music at Yle X3M), Anssi Autio (UMK producer), Johan Lindroos (Head of Music at Yle Radio Suomi), Jussi Mäntysaari (Head of Music at Nelonen Media), Juha-Matti Valtonen (television director), Katri Norrlin (music journalist at YleX) and Samuli Väänänen (Senior Editor at Spotify Finland). The competing entries were presented on 11 January 2023, while their lyric videos were released between 12 and 20 January 2023.

Artist	Song	Songwriter(s)
Benjamin	"Hoida mut"	Atso Soivio, Benjamin Peltonen, Iivari Suosalo
Käärijä	"Cha Cha Cha"	Aleksi Nurmi, Johannes Naukkarinen, Jere Pöyhönen
Keira	"No Business on the Dancefloor"	Axel Ehnström, Jason OK, Teemu Brunila
Kuumaa	"Ylivoimainen"	Aarni Soivio, Johannes Brotherus, Jonas Olsson, Jonttu Luhtavaara
Lxandra	"Something to Lose"	Alexandra Lehti, Amy Kuney, Belinda Huang, Minna Koivisto
Portion Boys	"Samaa taivasta katsotaan"	Mikael Forsby, Mikko Tamminen, Raimo Paavola
Robin Packalen	"Girls Like You"	Joonas Parkkonen, Robin Packalen, Zoë Moss

==== Final ====
The final took place on 25 February 2023 where seven entries competed. "Cha Cha Cha" performed by Käärijä was selected as the winner by a combination of public votes (75%) and seven international jury groups from Australia, Germany, Poland, Spain, Sweden, Ukraine and the United Kingdom (25%). The viewers had a total of 882 points to award, while the juries had a total of 294 points to award. Each jury group distributed their points as follows: 2, 4, 6, 8, 10 and 12 points. The viewer vote was based on the percentage of votes each song achieved through the following voting methods: telephone, SMS and app voting. For example, if a song gains 10% of the viewer vote, then that entry would be awarded 10% of 882 points rounded to the nearest integer: 88 points. A total of 231,968 votes were cast during the show: 93,324 votes through telephone and SMS and 138,644 votes through the Yle app.

In addition to the performances of the competing entries, the show was opened by Bess performing "Lähtee käsistä" and "Ram pam pam", while the interval acts featured The Rasmus, who represented Finland in 2022, performing their song "Live and Never Die" and Samu Haber performing his song "Syödään sieniä".

Final – 25 February 2023
R/O	Artist	Song	Jury	Televote			Total	Place
R/O	Artist	Song	Jury	Votes	Percentage	Points	Total	Place
1	Robin Packalen	"Girls Like You"	28	21,303	9.2%	81	109	4
2	Kuumaa	"Ylivoimainen"	44	16,569	7.1%	63	107	5
3	Käärijä	"Cha Cha Cha"	72	122,822	52.9%	467	539	1
4	Keira	"No Business on the Dancefloor"	42	23,933	10.3%	91	133	3
5	Benjamin	"Hoida mut"	34	8,416	3.6%	32	66	7
6	Lxandra	"Something to Lose"	46	6,312	2.7%	24	70	6
7	Portion Boys	"Samaa taivasta katsotaan"	28	32,613	14.1%	124	152	2

Detailed international jury votes
R/O	Song	United Kingdom	Germany	Spain	Sweden	Poland	Australia	Ukraine	Total
R/O	Song	United Kingdom	Germany	Spain	Sweden	Poland	Australia	Ukraine	Total
1	"Girls Like You"	2		2	8	2	2	12	28
2	"Ylivoimainen"	10	6	6	4	4	6	8	44
3	"Cha Cha Cha"	6	12	12	10	10	12	10	72
4	"No Business on the Dancefloor"	12	4	4	6	6	4	6	42
5	"Hoida mut"		2		12	12	8		34
6	"Something to Lose"	4	10	10		8	10	4	46
7	"Samaa taivasta katsotaan"	8	8	8	2			2	28
International jury spokespersons
United Kingdom – William Lee Adams; Germany – Mark Forster; Spain – Angy Fernández; Sweden – Cornelia Jakobs; Poland – Kamil Staszczyszyn; Australia – Jude York; Ukraine – Timur Miroshnychenko

=== Promotion ===
Käärijä made several appearances across Europe to specifically promote "Cha Cha Cha" as the Finnish Eurovision entry. On 8 April, Käärijä performed during the PrePartyES event, which was held at the Sala La Riviera venue in Madrid, Spain and hosted by Victor Escudero, SuRie and Ruslana. On 15 April, Käärijä performed during the Eurovision in Concert event which was held at the AFAS Live venue in Amsterdam, Netherlands and hosted by Cornald Maas and Hila Noorzai. On 16 April, Käärijä performed during the London Eurovision Party, which was held at the Here at Outernet venue in London, United Kingdom and hosted by Nicki French and Paddy O'Connell.

== At Eurovision ==
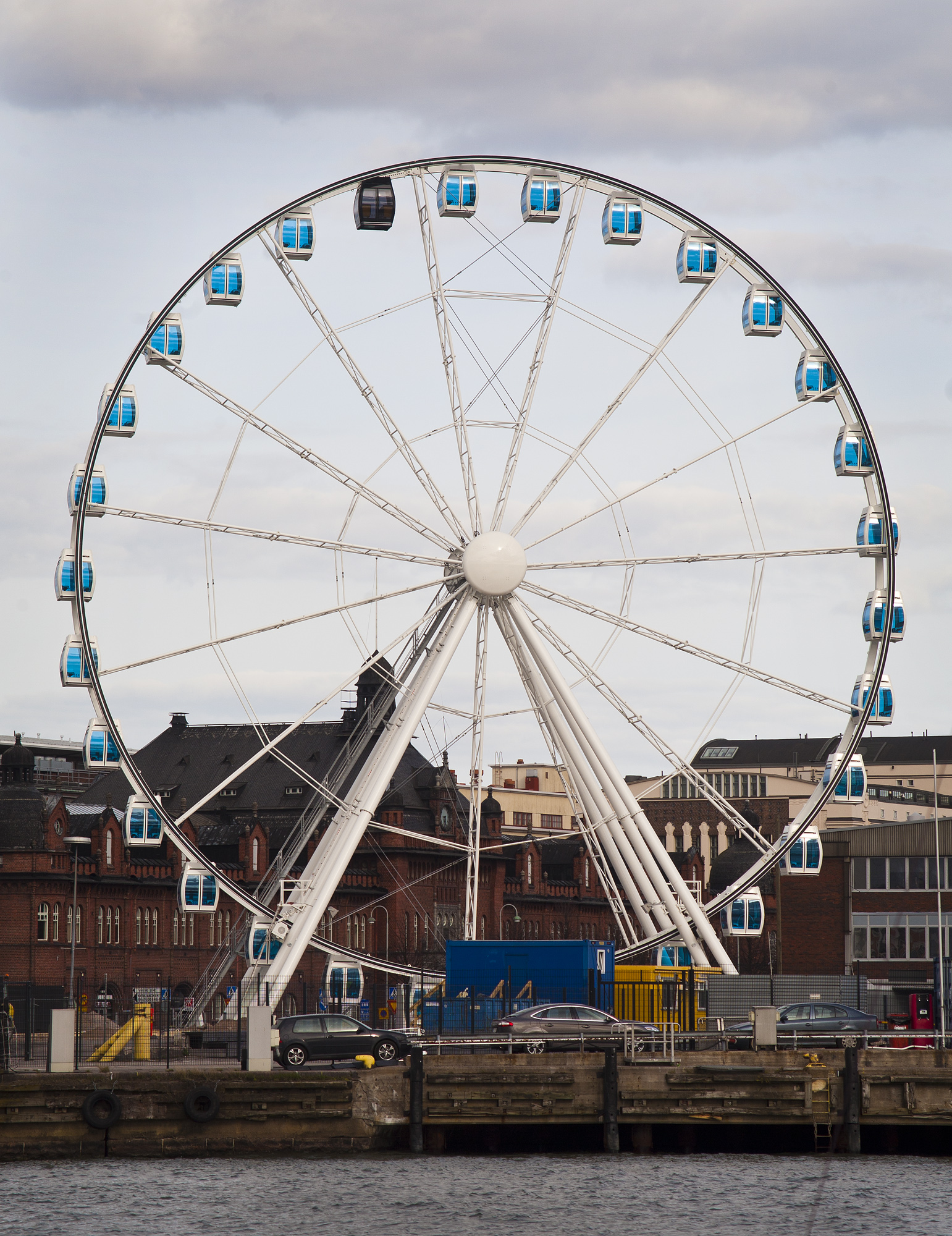
A video postcard introduced Käärijä's performance in the first semi-final of the Eurovision Song Contest 2023. The postcard was filmed at SkyWheel Helsinki in March 2023 in collaboration with the host broadcaster BBC. The Wheel of Liverpool and the Podil ferris wheel in Kyiv also featured in the Finnish postcard.

According to Eurovision rules, all nations with the exceptions of the host country and the "Big Five" (France, Germany, Italy, Spain, and the United Kingdom) are required to qualify from one of two semi-finals in order to compete for the final; the top ten countries from each semi-final progress to the final. The European Broadcasting Union (EBU) split up the competing countries into six different pots based on voting patterns from previous contests, with countries with favourable voting histories put into the same pot. On 31 January 2023, an allocation draw was held, which placed each country into one of the two semi-finals, and determined which half of the show they would perform in. Finland was placed into the first semi-final, to be held on 9 May 2023, and has been scheduled to perform in the second half of the show.

Once all the competing songs for the 2023 contest had been released, the running order for the semi-finals was decided by the shows' producers rather than through another draw, so that similar songs were not placed next to each other. Finland was set to perform last in position 15, following the entry from the Netherlands.

The two semi-finals and the final were televised in Finland on Yle TV1 with commentary in Finnish by Mikko Silvennoinen. The three shows were also broadcast via radio with Finnish commentary by Sanna Pirkkalainen and Jorma Hietamäki on Yle Radio Suomi, with Swedish commentary by Eva Frantz and Johan Lindroos on Yle X3M, and with Finnish commentary by Sini Laitinen on YleX in the first semi-final and the final. The three shows were also available online via the Yle Areena platform with additional commentary options; alongside the Finnish commentary by Silvennoinen and the Swedish commentary by Frantz and Lindroos, commentary was also available in Inari Sámi by Heli Huovinen and Northern Sámi by Aslak Paltto for all three shows, and in Russian by Levan Tvaltvadze and Ukrainian by Galyna Sergeyeva for the first semi-final and the final. Yle appointed Bess as its spokesperson to announce the top 12-point score awarded by the Finnish jury during the final.

The broadcast of the first semi-final on Yle TV1, which included the participation of Finland, reached an average of 1.337 million people over the age of 3, which represents a 78% market share. The broadcast of the final reached a peak of 2.8 million viewers, with an average of 1.7 million viewers watching the entire show on Yle TV1 and an additional 800,000 viewers through Yle Areena and the Yle website. Representing a 85.6% market share of all TV viewers in Finland, this marked Finland's highest audience figures for a contest final since 2007, when the event was held in Helsinki.

=== Semi-final ===
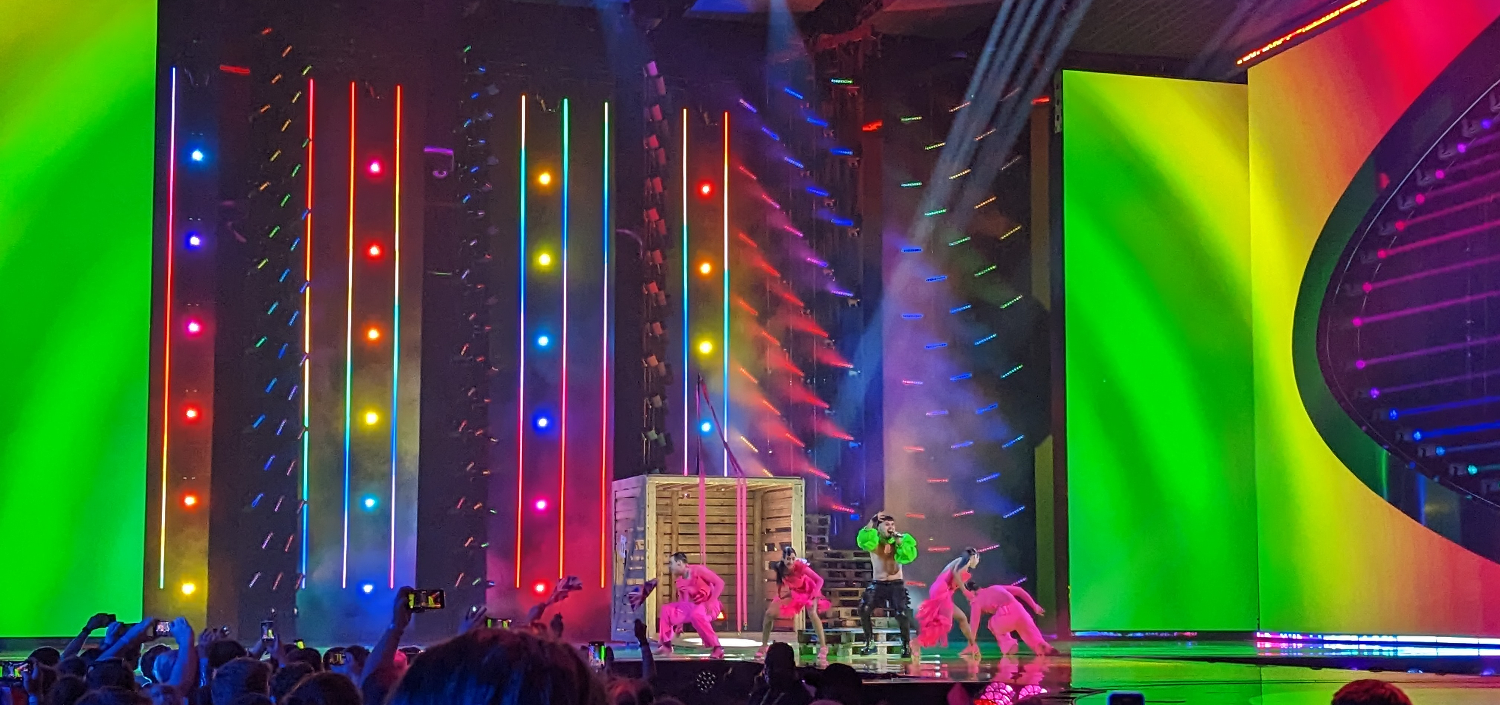
Käärijä during a rehearsal before the first semi-final

Käärijä took part in technical rehearsals on 1 and 3 May, followed by dress rehearsals on 8 and 9 May. This included the jury show on 8 May where the professional back-up juries of each country watched and voted in a result used if any issues with public televoting occurred. On the day of the first semi-final, Finland was considered by bookmakers to be the most likely country to advance into the final together with Sweden.

The Finnish performance featured Käärijä performing a choreographed routine in a green bolero jacket. The stage featured a stack of pallets and a huge wooden box prop which Käärijä began his performance from before returning to the floor, with one side of the box later opening up and revealing four dancers wearing pink outfits. The performers formed a human centipede on the satellite stage in the middle part of the song and the performance was concluded with fireworks bursting from each side of the box. The LED screens transitioned from a giant shadow mimicking Käärijä's movements with a snake tongue to rainbow colours at the end of the song. The four dancers that joined Käärijä on stage were Etel Röhr, Jesse Wijnans, Katri Mäkinen and Matti Myllyaho, while an off-stage backing vocalist was also featured: Aija Puurtinen.

At the end of the show, Finland was announced as having finished in the top 10 and subsequently qualifying for the grand final. It was later revealed that the Finland placed first in the semi-final, receiving a total of 177 points.

=== Final ===
Shortly after the first semi-final, a winners' press conference was held for the ten qualifying countries. As part of this press conference, the qualifying artists took part in a draw to determine which half of the grand final they would subsequently participate in. This draw was done in the order the countries appeared in the semi-final running order. Finland was drawn to compete in the first half. Following this draw, the shows' producers decided upon the running order of the final, as they had done for the semi-finals. Finland was subsequently placed to perform in position 13, after the entry from Estonia and before the entry from Czechia. On the day of the grand final, bookmakers considered Finland the second most likely country to win the competition.

Käärijä once again took part in dress rehearsals on 12 and 13 May before the final, including the jury final where the professional juries cast their final votes before the live show. Käärijä performed a repeat of his semi-final performance during the final on 13 May. Finland placed second in the final, scoring 526 points: 376 points from the televoting and 150 points from the juries.

=== Voting ===
Voting during the three shows involved each country awarding sets of points from 1–8, 10 and 12: one from their professional jury and the other from televoting in the final vote, while the semi-final vote was based entirely on the vote of the public. Each nation's jury consisted of five music industry professionals who are citizens of the country they represent. This jury judged each entry based on: vocal capacity; the stage performance; the song's composition and originality; and the overall impression by the act. In addition, each member of a national jury may only take part in the panel once every three years, and no jury was permitted to discuss of their vote with other members or be related in any way to any of the competing acts in such a way that they cannot vote impartially and independently. The individual rankings of each jury member in an anonymised form as well as the nation's televoting results were released shortly after the grand final.

Below is a breakdown of points awarded to Finland and awarded by Finland in the first semi-final and grand final of the contest, and the breakdown of the jury voting and televoting conducted during the two shows:

==== Points awarded to Finland ====
Points awarded to Finland (Semi-final 1)
Score	Televote
12 points	Croatia; Germany; Ireland; Israel; Latvia; Norway; Sweden
10 points	Netherlands; Portugal; Rest of the World; Serbia; Switzerland
8 points	Azerbaijan; Czech Republic
7 points	France; Italy; Malta
6 points	Moldova
5 points	
4 points	
3 points	
2 points	
1 point	

Points awarded to Finland (Final)
Score	Televote	Jury
12 points	Australia; Austria; Belgium; Denmark; Estonia; Germany; Iceland; Ireland; Israel; Latvia; Lithuania; Netherlands; Norway; San Marino; Serbia; Spain; Sweden; United Kingdom	Norway; Sweden
10 points	Croatia; Czech Republic; Greece; Poland; Portugal; Rest of the World; Romania; Slovenia; Ukraine	Estonia; Iceland; Netherlands
8 points	Azerbaijan; Georgia; Malta; Switzerland	Armenia; Austria; Denmark; France; Ireland; Israel; Malta
7 points	Cyprus; Moldova	Croatia; Serbia
6 points	Albania; Armenia; France; Italy	
5 points		Australia; Belgium; Czech Republic
4 points		
3 points		Azerbaijan; Cyprus; Lithuania
2 points		
1 point		Georgia; Spain

==== Points awarded by Finland ====
Points awarded by Finland (Semi-final)
Score	Televote
12 points	Czech Republic
10 points	Norway
8 points	Switzerland
7 points	Moldova
6 points	Croatia
5 points	Sweden
4 points	Serbia
3 points	Latvia
2 points	Portugal
1 point	Israel

Points awarded by Finland (Final)
Score	Televote	Jury
12 points	Norway	Sweden
10 points	Czech Republic	Switzerland
8 points	Australia	Czech Republic
7 points	Slovenia	France
6 points	Estonia	Italy
5 points	Germany	Belgium
4 points	Croatia	United Kingdom
3 points	Moldova	Portugal
2 points	Austria	Austria
1 point	Switzerland	Cyprus

==== Detailed voting results ====
The following members comprised the Finnish jury:

- Jonas Olsson (jury chairperson) – music producer
- Kaisa Korhonen – songwriter
- Ilkka Mattila – journalist
- Saara Everi – Head of marketing and PR, PME Records
- Niina Jokiaho – Head of Radio Nova

Detailed voting results from Finland (Semi-final 1)
R/O	Country	Televote	
R/O	Country	Rank	Points
01	Norway	2	10
02	Malta	11	
03	Serbia	7	4
04	Latvia	8	3
05	Portugal	9	2
06	Ireland	14	
07	Croatia	5	6
08	Switzerland	3	8
09	Israel	10	1
10	Moldova	4	7
11	Sweden	6	5
12	Azerbaijan	12	
13	Czech Republic	1	12
14	Netherlands	13	
15	Finland		

Detailed voting results from Finland (Final)
R/O	Country	Jury							Televote	
R/O	Country	Juror 1	Juror 2	Juror 3	Juror 4	Juror 5	Rank	Points	Rank	Points
01	Austria	9	4	10	23	10	9	2	9	2
02	Portugal	11	10	9	4	12	8	3	23	
03	Switzerland	4	16	2	2	1	2	10	10	1
04	Poland	8	23	18	17	16	20		19	
05	Serbia	25	24	25	14	13	24		12	
06	France	14	9	5	7	4	4	7	11	
07	Cyprus	3	22	11	15	14	10	1	18	
08	Spain	19	8	8	19	19	17		20	
09	Sweden	1	2	1	1	2	1	12	13	
10	Albania	23	15	21	8	23	21		21	
11	Italy	13	14	6	12	3	5	6	17	
12	Estonia	12	11	4	13	21	12		5	6
13	Finland									
14	Czech Republic	5	1	3	6	11	3	8	2	10
15	Australia	7	5	12	20	25	13		3	8
16	Belgium	18	12	19	3	5	6	5	14	
17	Armenia	16	21	20	22	6	18		24	
18	Moldova	15	25	24	11	22	23		8	3
19	Ukraine	21	13	13	24	8	19		16	
20	Norway	10	17	7	10	9	14		1	12
21	Germany	17	20	15	9	24	22		6	5
22	Lithuania	6	18	17	5	17	11		22	
23	Israel	20	6	14	18	7	15		15	
24	Slovenia	22	19	23	16	18	25		4	7
25	Croatia	24	3	22	21	15	16		7	4
26	United Kingdom	2	7	16	25	20	7	4	25	
