= Mantila =

Mantila is a Finnish surname. Notable people with the surname include:

- Auli Mantila (born 1964), Finnish film director, writer, producer, and actress
- Jari Mantila (born 1971), Finnish Nordic combined skier
