= Glass jaw =

Glass jaw may refer to:

- a fighter with limited ability to absorb punishment to the chin or jaw
- Glass Jaw (a.k.a. Lasileuka, ), a 2004 Finnish short drama film directed by Zaida Bergroth
- Glassjaw, an American rock band
