= Portion Boys =

Finnish musical group

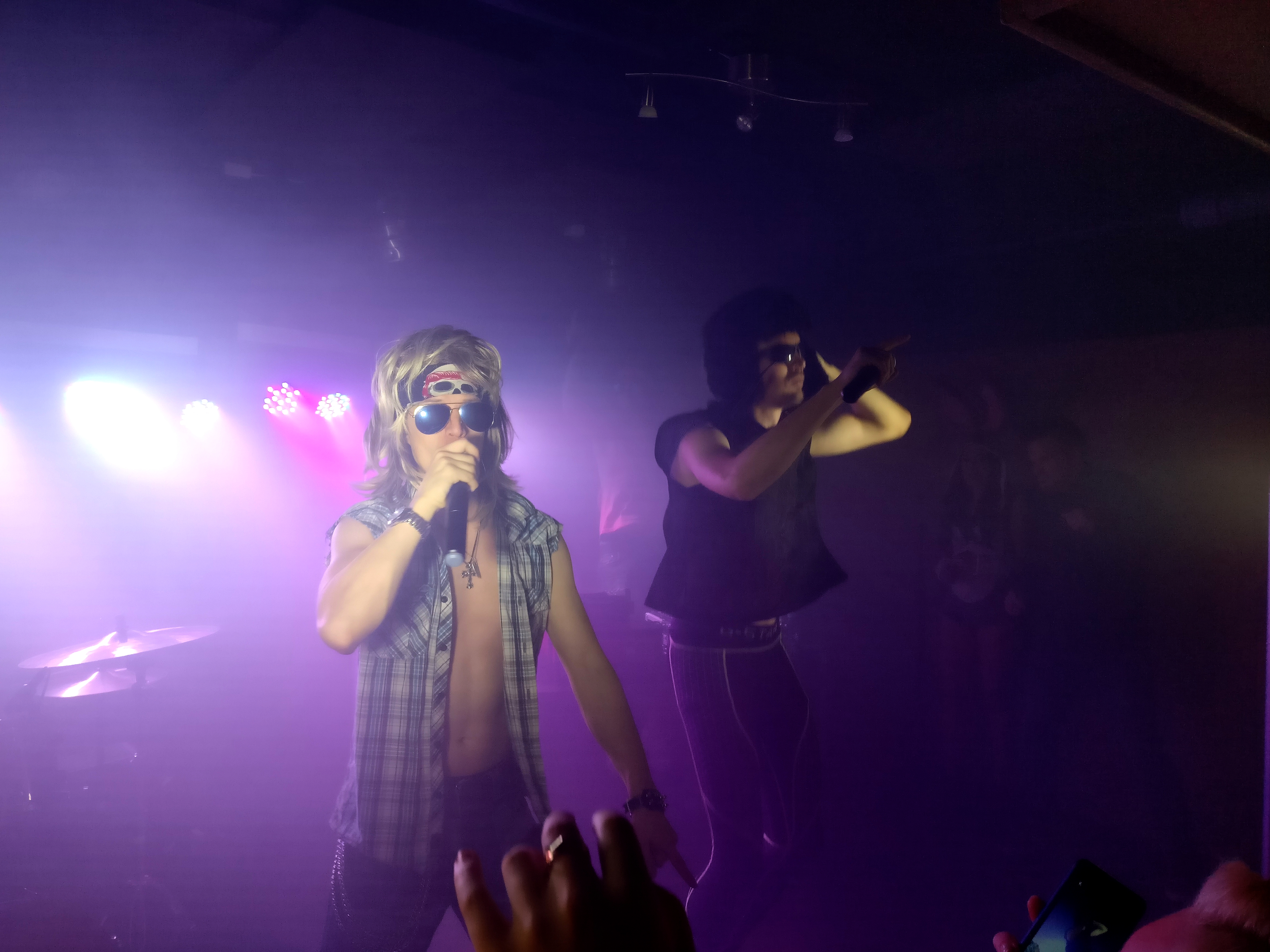
- Portion Boys in 2017

Background information
- Origin: Helsinki, Finland
- Genres: Finnish pop; dance-pop
- Years active: 2010–present
- Label: Sony Music Finland
- Members: Aapo Vuori; Raimo Paavola; Mikael Forsby; Roope Nieminen; Tiina Forsby
- Past members: Jyrki Paavola
- Website: portionboys.fi

Portion Boys are a Finnish dance-pop band formed in 2010 in Helsinki.

== History ==
The members of Portion Boys are originally from Isojoki and Tampere. The group started releasing music on YouTube in 2010, and as of 2014 their singles are digitally distributed by Sony Music Finland. They first entered the Finnish singles chart in 2016 with their single "Pokemoneja". As of 2022, the group has reached the top ten of the national chart on five other occasions, achieving a first place in the summer of 2021 with their song, "Vauhti kiihtyy", a certified double platinum.

On 11 January 2023, Portion Boys were announced as one of seven participants in Uuden Musiikin Kilpailu 2023, the Finnish national selection for the Eurovision Song Contest 2023. Their entry "Samaa taivasta katsotaan" was released on 19 January 2023. In the final, they finished in second place with a total of 152 points (124 from the televote and 28 points from the juries).

== Members ==
=== Current members ===
- Aapo "A.P." Vuori – lead vocals (2021–present)
- Raimo "Kenraali Vahva" Paavola – rap (2010–present)
- Mikael "El Meissel" Forsby – keyboards (2010–present)
- Roope "Taiteilija" Nieminen – drums (2017–present)
- Tiina "JaloTiina" Forsby – dance (2016–present)

=== Past members ===
- Jyrki "Jay Rocka" Paavola – lead vocals (2010–2020)

== Discography ==
=== Studio albums ===
- Dynastia (2023)
- Portion of Secret Melodies Vol. 2 (2023)

=== Extended plays ===
- Portion of Secret Melodies (2020)
- Suomalainen joulu (2021)

=== Singles ===
Singles as lead artist
Title	Year	Peak chart positions	Album
Title	Year	FIN	Album
"Pelimiehen paratiisi"	2010	—	Non-album singles
"Nej nej" (featuring Åke från Team Sweden)	2011	—	Non-album singles
"Huuleen"	2012	—	Non-album singles
"Pumppaa"	2012	—	Non-album singles
"Kuka pelkää leijonaa"	2012	—	Non-album singles
"Pumppaa" (Updated version)	2013	—	Non-album singles
"Luolamies"	2014	—	Non-album singles
"Loma"	2015	—	Non-album singles
"Sierralla Nevadaan"	2015	—	Non-album singles
"Kuka pelkää leijonaa 2016"	2016	—	Non-album singles
"Lännen nopein mies"	2016	—	Non-album singles
"Pokemoneja"	2016	10	Non-album singles
"Pokemon"	2016	—	Non-album singles
"Huudetaan"	2016	—	Non-album singles
"Karjala takas"	2017	3	Non-album singles
"Intti"	2017	—	Non-album singles
"Miesflunssa" (featuring HesaÄijä)	2017	—	Non-album singles
"8–0"	2018	—	Non-album singles
"Rantahärkä"	2018	—	Non-album singles
"Niin kuin ennenkin"	2018	—	Non-album singles
"Mieleni pahoitin"	2019	12	Non-album singles
"Päivit tua menee" (featuring Pasi ja Anssi)	2019	19	Non-album singles
"Lihamafia"	2019	—	Non-album singles
"Pumppaa"	2019	—	Non-album singles
"Maanantai"	2020	—	Non-album singles
"Kyläbaari"	2021	15	Dynastia
"Vauhti kiihtyy" (featuring Matti ja Teppo)	2021	1	Dynastia
"Elämän ABC"	2022	3	Dynastia
"Kaasu pohjaan"	2022	—	Non-album single
"Nautin elämästä" (with Teflon Brothers)	2022	5	Dynastia
"Samaa taivasta katsotaan"	2023	5	Dynastia
"Seksi seinäjoella"	2023	9	Dynastia
"Tilipäivä"	2023	36	Dynastia
"Käärinliinat"	2024	40	Non-album singles
"Juhannusyö" (with Kake Randelin)	2024	2	Non-album singles
"Sä et ole yksin"	2025	40	Non-album singles
"Vappupallo"	2025	21	Non-album singles
"Tämän kesän viheltelen"	2025	21	Non-album singles
"Eläköön elämä" (with Sonja Lumme)	2026	25	Non-album singles
"Koko Suomi tanssii" (with Komiat)	2026	9	Non-album singles
