= Elsa Saisio =

Finnish actress (born 1981)

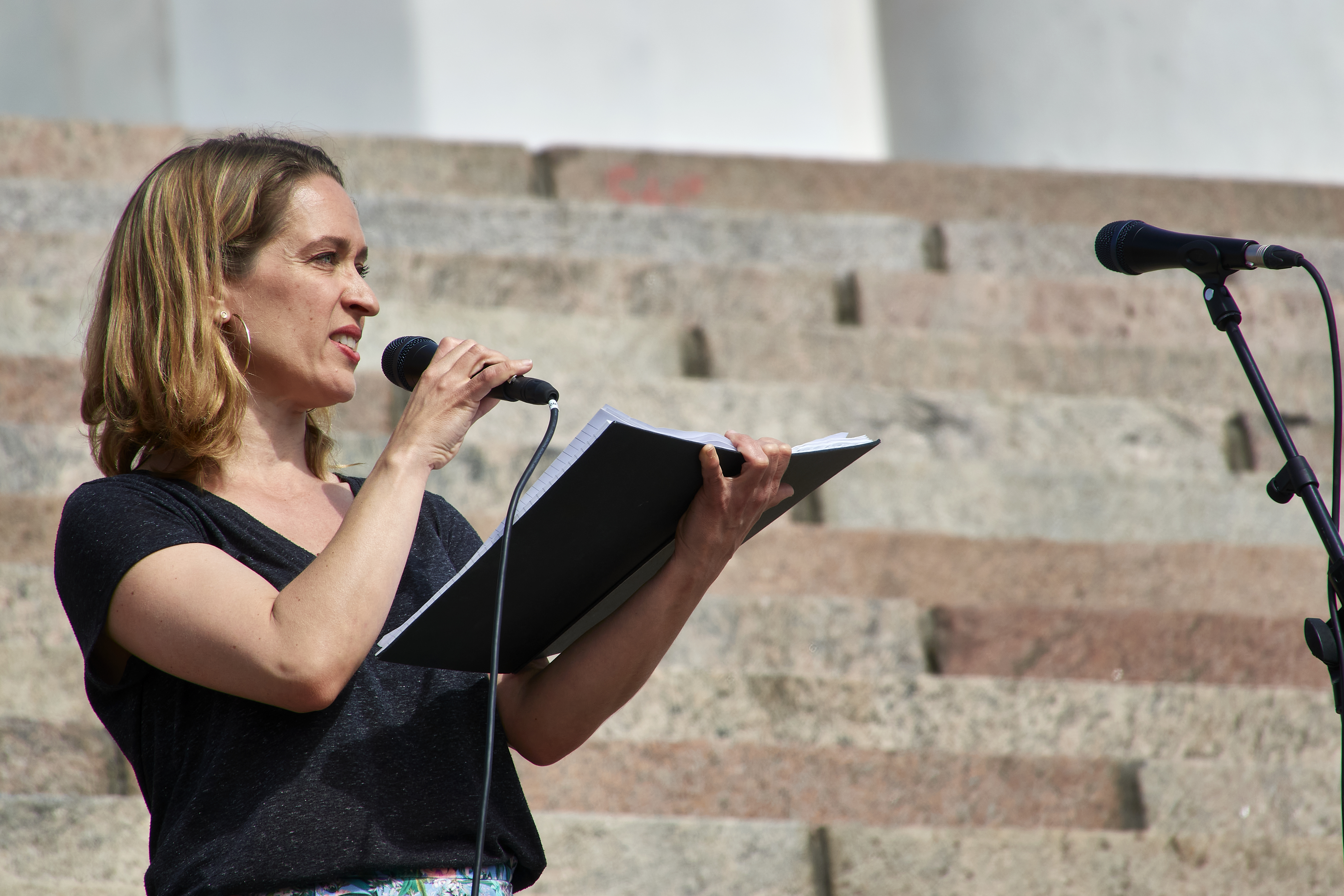
Elsa Saisio

Elsa Helena Saisio (born 19 July 1981) is a Finnish actress. She graduated from the Helsinki Theatre Academy in 2003.

Saisio began her professional career in Shakespeare productions already before her graduation. Her early stage roles include Julia, Ophelia, Anya in The Cherry Orchard and Cordelia in King Lear. She has made several main and supporting roles in Finnish movies and frequent television appearances along with her stage career.

Saisio grew in a theatre family: her parents are Pirkko Saisio and Pirjo Honkasalo, and her biological father Harri Hyttinen was also an actor.

She has appeared in the 2022 television series Stop Nyqvist and Whiskey on the Rocks.
