= Vauhti kiihtyy =

1989 single by Matti ja Teppo

Single by Matti ja Teppo

from the album Aito tunne
- A-side: "Vauhti kiihtyy"
- B-side: "Idän pikajuna"
- Published: 1989
- Genre: Pop song
- Length: 3:02 (1989) 3:25 (2021)

Vauhti kiihtyy is a song by Finnish iskelmä duo Matti ja Teppo, released in 1989 on the album Aito Tunne, and on a seven-inch vinyl single. The song is written by Matti Rouhonen and composed by Veli-Pekka Lehto.

In 2021, a new version of the song was released, produced by Michael Forsby and Jaakko Salovaara. The new version was made according to the Portion Boys version of the song published in the same year. The duo also performed the song live on MTV3's version of Dancing with the Stars, Tanssii tähtien kanssa in October 2021.

== Track listing ==
=== 7" (1989) ===
No.	Name	Lyrics	Note	Duration
1.	Vauhti kiihtyy	Matti Ruohonen	Veli-Pekka Lehto	3:00
2.	Idän pikajuna	Matti Ruohonen	Veli-Pekka Lehto	3:14

=== Digital single (2021) ===
No.	Name	Lyrics	Note	Duration
1.	Vauhti kiihtyy 2021	Matti Ruohonen	Veli-Pekka Lehto	3:25

== Portion Boys version ==
"Vauhti kiihtyy"

Single by Portion Boys
- Published: 11 June 2021
- Genre: Rap, Dance
- Length: 3:31
- Producers: Mikael Forsby, Jaakko Salovaara

Portion Boys singles chronology
"Kyläbaari" (2021)	"Vauhti kiihtyy" (2021)

Finnish rap group Portion Boys released a new version of the song in the summer of 2021, with the original performers Matti and Teppo participating in the chorus. This version was also nominated for song of the year at the kevään 2022 Emma-gaalassa.

The idea for this version started in the summer of 2020, when member of the band Tiina Forsby presented the original song to her husband, the band's keyboardist-producer Mikael Forsby. Mikael was enthusiastic about the idea and soon outlined what kind of version of the song would be made. Matti Ruohonen of Mati ja Tepo was also enthusiastic about the idea and gave it his approval. The tempo of this version has double the tempo of the original, and new rap verses were written in. Matti and Teppo recorded their parts again.

A music video was also released for this version. According to the original plan, Matti and Teppo were supposes to perform, but had to be cancelled due to the COVID-19 pandemic. Instead, 3D models of the two were used.

This version of the song became a major hit during the summer and fall of 2021. Since its release, it was in the top ten of Finland's official singles list for 28 weeks, including 13 weeks in the top three. The single has also reached double platinum.

For Christmas 2021, Portion Boys released a Christmas version of the song under the name "Pikkujolut kiihtyy".

=== Song details ===
No.	Name	Lyrics	Duration
1.	Vauhti kiihtyy	Matti Ruohonen, Mikael Forsby, Raimo Paavola, Veli-Pekka Lehto	3:31
