= Geography of Fear =

- Original Finnish film poster.
- Directed by: Auli Mantila
- Written by: Auli Mantila
- Based on: Geography of Fear by Anja Kauranen
- Produced by: Tero Kaukomaa
- Starring: Tanjalotta Räikkä; Leea Klemola; Eija Vilpas; Pertti Sveholm; Kari Sorvali; Anna-Elina Lyytikäinen
- Cinematography: Heikki Färm
- Edited by: Kimmo Taavila
- Music by: Hilmar Örn Hilmarsson
- Production companies: Blind Spot Pictures Oy, Finnish Broadcasting Company, Nordisk Film & TV-Fond, Zentropa, Eurimages, Arte, NDR, Wüste Film
- Release date: 2000
- Running time: 95 minutes
- Countries: Finland, Denmark, France, Germany
- Language: Finnish
- Budget: 8.5 million FIM

Geography of Fear (Finnish: Pelon maantiede) is a 2000 Finnish-Danish-French-German thriller film written and directed by Auli Mantila. The film is based on the novel of the same name by Anja Kauranen, first published in Finland in 1995. It won the Jussi Award for Best Screenplay in 2001.

== Plot ==
Forensic dentist Oili Lyyra (Tanjalotta Räikkä) and her detective partner and lover Eero Harakka (Kari Sorvali) investigate the identity of a corpse found in Helsinki harbor. The decomposed body, wearing only red swimming trunks, proves difficult to identify. Oili collaborates closely with pathologist Lipponen in the case.

Soon after the body is found, Oili meets the friends of her sister Laura (Anna-Elina Lyytikäinen), a radical feminist group seeking revenge against violent men. The group's leader, Maaru Tang (Leea Klemola), is a well-known author and public speaker on the topic of fear.

Oili's sister Laura is an insecure young woman who dropped out of medical school five years ago and has since struggled to find direction. She resents Oili's protective attitude, which led her to join Maaru's group. One night, the women reveal to Oili that they killed the man found in the harbor. Their intention was only to teach him a lesson for his treatment of women, but he suffered a fatal heart attack. In a shocking turn, Oili realizes that Laura was involved. The group pressures Oili to prevent the body from being identified. As Oili grapples with her dilemma, Laura becomes the victim of a brutal attack. Meanwhile, the group targets their next victim, driving instructor Rainer Sakari Auvinen (Pertti Sveholm), who has allegedly been intimidating women for years.

Caught between her duty and her loyalty to Laura, Oili must decide whether to protect her sister or expose the group. The feminist group is also plagued by fear—not of their actions, but of being exposed and losing their ability to continue their crusade against male violence.

== Production ==
The film was an international co-production involving Finnish, Danish, French, and German production companies, including Blind Spot, Finnish Broadcasting Company, Nordisk Film & TV-Fond, Zentropa, Eurimages, Arte, NDR, and Wüste Film. The budget was approximately 8.5 million Finnish markka.

=== Differences between book and film ===
Upon its 1995 publication, the novel created a stir in Finland due to its controversial themes. The book is more explicit in its portrayal of violence and revenge, featuring multiple murders rather than the single killing depicted in the film. The composition of the feminist group also differs: in the book, all the women are academics who met at an extreme feminism seminar, whereas in the film, only the leader has an academic background. The novel also provides a deeper exploration of how the women came together, whereas the film focuses more on their actions.

== Release and reception ==
The film premiered in Finland on 21 January 2000. In Germany, it first aired on Arte on 18 June 2001, with a second broadcast on 8 August 2002. It was later shown on BR on 30 January 2007. The film was screened at the Festival Internacional de Cine de Mar del Plata in Argentina on 12 March 2001 under the title La geografia del miedo. It was released in Denmark on 9 November 2001 under its international title, Geography of Fear. Additional releases followed in Spain, Finland, France, Croatia, Hungary, and Poland.

=== Critical reception ===
Finnish author Jussi Karjalainen noted that after just two films, Auli Mantila had developed a distinctive and individualistic directorial style.

=== Awards ===
At the Jussi Awards in Finland, Auli Mantila won the Best Screenplay prize.

Mantila also won the FIPRESCI Prize at Kinotavr in 2000 for "a provocative film that passionately addresses the issue of violence in modern society in a well-constructed, non-didactic manner."

At the Festróia – Tróia International Film Festival in 2001, Mantila was nominated for the Golden Dolphin.
