= Fire-Eater (film) =

1998 film

- Directed by: Pirjo Honkasalo
- Written by: Pirkko Saisio
- Produced by: Marko Röhr
- Starring: Elina Hurme; Tiina Weckström
- Cinematography: Kjell Lagerroos
- Edited by: Michal Leszczyłowski; Bernhard Winkler
- Music by: Richard Einhorn
- Production company: Marko Röhr Productions Oy
- Release date: 30 October 1998
- Running time: 100 minutes
- Country: Finland
- Language: Finnish

Fire-Eater (Finnish: Tulennielijä) is a 1998 Finnish film directed and written by Pirjo Honkasalo. It tells a story of two orphaned sisters who end up working in a travelling circus. The film received several international awards, including the Grand Jury prize at the American Film Institute International Film Festival in 1998.

== Main cast ==
- Elina Hurme as Helena Sulander
- Tiina Weckström as Sirkka Sulander
- Elena Leeve as Helena as a teenager
- Elsa Saisio as Irene Sulander as a teenager
- Vappu Jurkka as Grandmother
- Jordi Borrell as Ramon
