= Elena Leeve =

Finnish actress (born 1983)

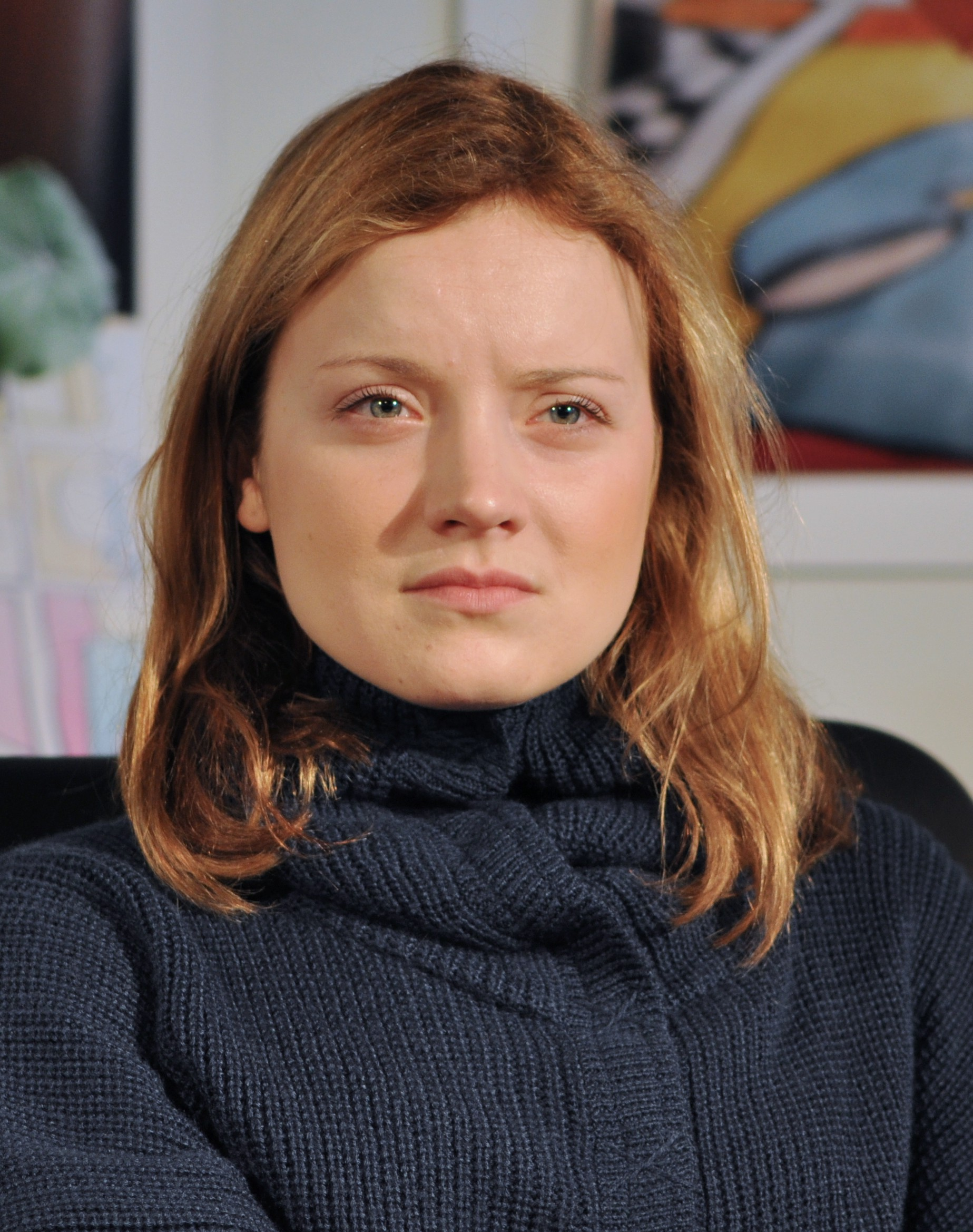
Leeve in 2009

Elena Maire Karin Leeve (born 1 February 1983 in Helsinki) is a Finnish actress who has worked on television, in films and on stage. She received a Jussi Award as the Best Leading Actress for her work in a Pirjo Honkasalo film Fire-Eater in 1999. In 2009, she won her second Jussi for the leading role in a film Putoavia enkeleitä.

== Selected filmography ==
=== Films ===
- Fire-Eater (1998)
- Cyclomania (2001)
- Beauty and the Bastard (2005)
- Ganes (2007)
- Putoavia enkeleitä (2008)
- Risto (2011)
- August Fools (2013)
- Kikka! (2022)

=== Television ===
- M/S Romantic (2019)
