= Cyclomania =

2001 film by Simo Halinen

- Promotional poster
- Directed by: Simo Halinen
- Written by: Simo Halinen
- Starring: Lauri Nurkse; Tommi Mujunen; Elena Leeve
- Release date: 2001
- Running time: 93 minutes
- Country: Finland
- Language: Finnish
- Budget: 1,189,000 euros

Cyclomania is a 2001 Finnish movie directed and written by Simo Halinen. Three teenage cyclists, two boys and a girl trying to balance friendship, competition and a growing romance.

== Synopsis ==
The two good friends K (Lauri Nurkse) and Eetu (Tommi Mujunen) works as bicycle messengers in Helsinki, in the evenings they practice hard to qualify for the Finnish championships. Their lives change when Oona (Elena Leeve) starts working at the same company.

== See also ==
- List of films about bicycles and cycling
