= Concrete Night =

- Film poster
- Directed by: Pirjo Honkasalo
- Written by: Pirjo Honkasalo; Pirkko Saisio
- Based on: Betoniyö by Pirkko Saisio
- Produced by: Mark Lwoff; Misha Jaari
- Starring: Johannes Brotherus; Jari Virman; Anneli Karppinen; Juhan Ulfsak
- Cinematography: Peter Flinckenberg
- Edited by: Niels Pagh Andersen
- Production companies: Bufo; Magic Hour Films; Plattform Produktion
- Release date: 7 September 2013
- Running time: 93 minutes
- Countries: Finland, Sweden, Denmark
- Language: Finnish

Concrete Night (Finnish: Betoniyö) is a 2013 drama film directed by Finnish filmmaker Pirjo Honkasalo. The film is based on a novel with the same name, written by Pirkko Saisio and published in 1981, though adapted to modern times. The story has also been adapted to theatre and has been played in Finland and in Venezuela. Concrete Night had its world premiere at Toronto International Film Festival in the Masters Series in September 2013. The film was shot in the Helsinki area in Finland in September and October 2012. Produced by Misha Jaari and Mark Lwoff from production company Bufo and co-produced by Swedish Plattform Produktion and Danish Magic Hour Film, the film was funded by Finnish Film Foundation, Yle, Nordisk Film & TV Fond, Swedish Film Institute, Danish Film Institute and Danske Radio. The film was nominated for the 2014 Nordic Council Film Prize. It was selected as the Finnish entry for the Best Foreign Language Film at the 87th Academy Awards, but was not nominated.

== Plot ==
Concrete Night tells about a 14-year-old boy named Simo (Johannes Brotherus) who still lacks his own sense of self and the ability to protect himself from his surroundings. Simo and his big brother Ilkka are the sons of a helpless and unpredictable single mother. Their chaotic home is located deep in the heart of a concrete jungle in Helsinki. Ilkka has one day of freedom left before starting his prison sentence. The mother persuades Simo to spend the last night with his brother. Events heighten throughout the one day and night in Helsinki and the brothers witness incidents they would rather not see. Simo, who has no ability to distort what he sees or delude himself, sees things accurately as they are. When unfiltered, the world seems unbearable. Finally a casual encounter with a photographer, whose intentions Simo misreads, launches him into blind fear, which explodes in panic stricken violence. In this violence Simo finds his lacking identity, his true face.

== Reception ==
On 2 February 2014, Concrete Night received six Jussi Awards, including awards for the Best Film and Best Director of 2013. Cinematographer Peter Flinckenberg also received the American Society of Cinematographers Spotlight Award for the film. On review aggregator website Rotten Tomatoes, the film holds an approval rating of 60% based on 5 reviews.

== See also ==
- List of submissions to the 87th Academy Awards for Best Foreign Language Film
- List of Finnish submissions for the Academy Award for Best Foreign Language Film
