= Kikka! =

2022 Finnish film

- Original Finnish film poster
- Directed by: Anna Paavilainen
- Written by: Maarit Nissilä
- Produced by: Kaisla Viitala
- Starring: Sara Melleri; Elena Leeve; Jakob Öhrman; Martti Suosalo; Aku Hirviniemi
- Cinematography: Pietari Peltola
- Edited by: Tuuli Alanärä
- Production company: Elokuvayhtiö Komeetta
- Distributed by: Nordisk Film
- Release date: 2022
- Running time: 100 minutes
- Country: Finland
- Language: Finnish

Kikka! is a 2022 Finnish drama film about the Finnish singer Kikka (1964–2005). The film was written by Maarit Nissilä and directed by Anna Paavilainen. In the film, Kikka is played by Sara Melleri. Paula, Kikka's DJ and journalist friend is played by Elena Leeve, Kikka's husband Henkka by Jakob Öhrman, Ilkka Vainio by Aku Hirviniemi, Juha Vainio by Martti Suosalo and Asko, the boss of the record company by Kai Vaine.

Shooting of the film started in February 2021 and it was shot in the Finnish capital region, in Tampere and in many other places where Kikka appeared on gigs. The budget of the film was 1,505,000 euro, of which the Finnish Film Foundation financed 855,000 euro. Another film about Kikka was being made at the same time, produced by the film company Kinosto and directed by Taru Mäkelä. This project did not receive support from the Finnish Film Foundation and will not be completed.

The theme song of the film is Kateus ("envy") by Erika Vikman, published on 9 September 2022. A music video of the song was published on the same day.

Kikka! premiered on 12 October 2022.

The film was awarded two Jussi Awards in 2023: Sara Melleri received an award for best lead role and Tiina Kaukanen received an award for best dress design.

== Cast ==
Actor	Role
Sara Melleri	Kikka
Elena Leeve	Paula
Jakob Öhrman	Henkka
Aku Hirviniemi	Ilkka Vainio
Martti Suosalo	Juha Vainio
Kai Vaine	Asko
Samuli Niittymäki	Vesa
Tuomo Prättälä	Veikko Samuli
Sanna-Kaisa Palo	Riitta
Rea Mauranen	grandmother
Ville Tiihonen	Sepi

== Reception ==
- Marko Kilpilampi, Kulttuuritähdet
- Ismo Puljujärvi, Iltalehti
- Jasmin Vainio, Katso
- Jussi Huhtala, Episodi
- Kalle Kinnunen, Suomen Kuvalehti
- Mari Koppinen, Helsingin Sanomat
- Päivi Valotie, Turun Sanomat
- Krister Uggeldahl, Hufvudstadsbladet
