= Samaa taivasta katsotaan =

Single by Portion Boys
- Language: Finnish
- Released: 20 January 2023
- Length: 3:03
- Label: Sony Music Entertainment

Portion Boys singles chronology
"Nautin elämästä" (2022)	"Samaa taivasta katsotaan" (2023)	"Seksi Seinäjoella" (2023)

"Samaa taivasta katsotaan" is a song by Finnish group Portion Boys, released as a single on 20 January 2023. It was entered in Finland's national final for the 2023 Eurovision Song Contest, Uuden Musiikin Kilpailu 2023. The song finished second in the final with a total of 152 points. The song debuted at number five on The Official Finnish Charts.

The song was written by band members Mikael Forsby and Miko Tamminen, with the song's purpose stated to be to "bring joy and create a sense of togetherness".

== Charts ==
Chart performance for "Samaa taivasta katsotaan"
Chart (2023)	Peak position
Finland (Suomen virallinen lista)	5
Finland Airplay (Radiosoittolista)	4
