= Mysterion (film) =

- Directed by: Pirjo Honkasalo, Eira Mollberg
- Distributed by: Finnkino
- Release date: 12 March 1991
- Running time: 80 minutes
- Countries: Finland; Sweden

Mysterion is a 1991 documentary film by Finnish directors Pirjo Honkasalo and Eira Mollberg about a convent of Russian Orthodox nuns who have dedicated their lives to serving God. It is the first part of Honkasalo's "Trilogy of the Sacred and the Satanic", followed by Tanjuska and the 7 Devils (1993) and Atman (1997). The film won the main prize at the Balticum Film & TV Festival in Denmark in 1992.
