= Anja Snellman =

Finnish author

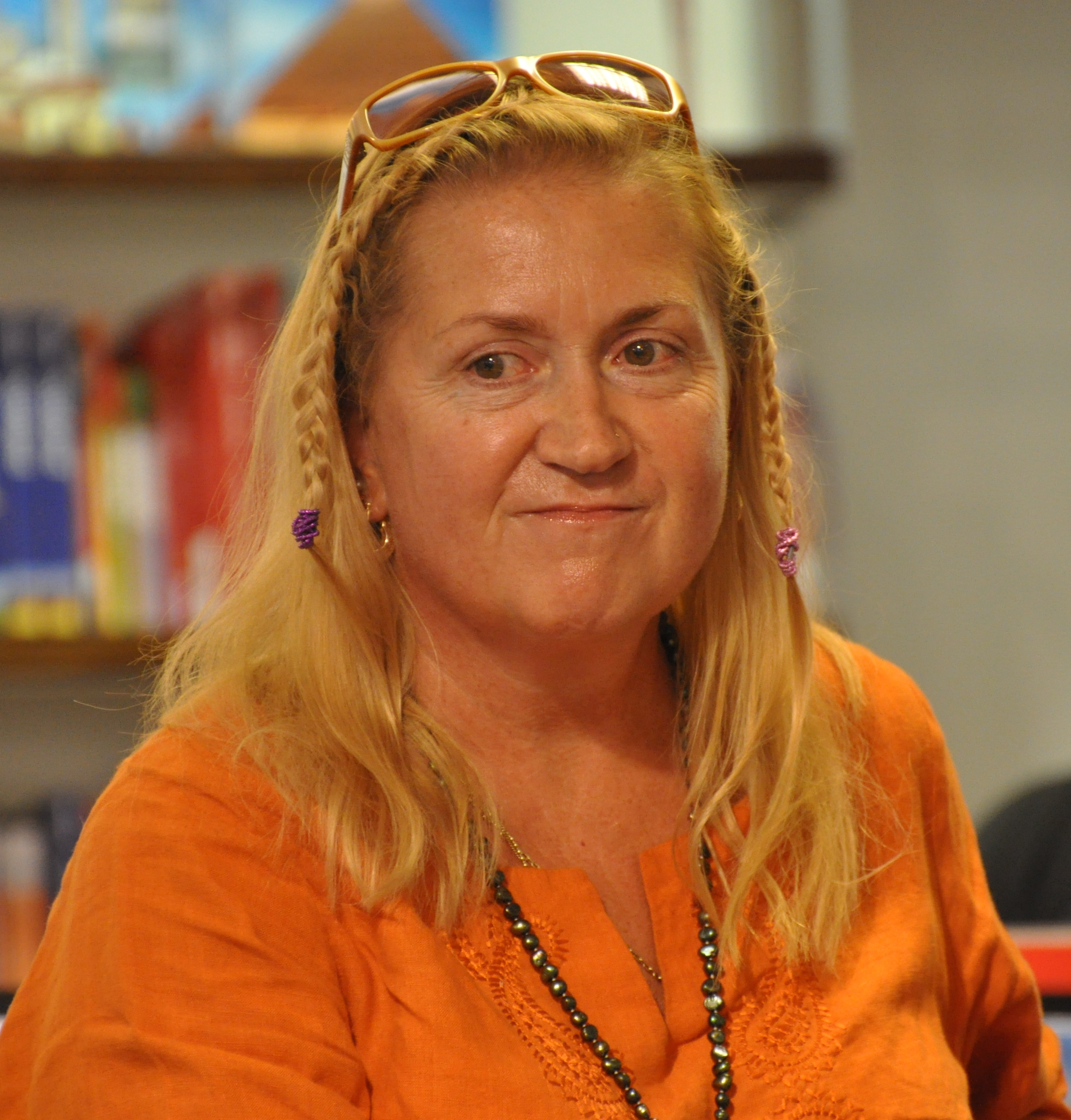
Anja Snellman in 2010.

Anja Kyllikki Snellman-Orma (née Kauranen; born 23 May 1954, in Helsinki) is a Finnish novelist, poet, journalist, television commentator, and psychotherapist.

Her books have been translated to 20 languages so far. She was awarded the Pro Finlandia Medal in 2007. Anja Snellman has two daughters from her first marriage to Saska Saarikoski-Snellman. Today she is married to Jukka Orma, a musician

Her novel Geography of Fear was adapted into the 2000 film of the same name.

== Selected works ==
Anja Snellman's novels and poetry collections:

- Sonja O. kävi täällä (1981; J. H. Erkko Award)
- Tushka (1983)
- Kultasuu (1985)
- Pimeää vain meidän silmillemme (1987)
- Kiinalainen kesä (1989)
- Kaipauksen ja energian lapset (1991)
- Ihon aika (1993)
- Pelon maantiede (1995)
- Syysprinssi (1996)
- Arabian Lauri (1997)
- Side (1998)
- Paratiisin kartta (1999)
- Aura (2000)
- Safari Club (2001)
- Äiti ja koira (2002)
- Lyhytsiipiset (2003)
- Saa kirjoittaa (2004), poetry collection
- Rakkauden maanosat (2005)
- Lemmikkikaupan tytöt (2007)
- Harry H (2007)
- "Parvekejumalat" (2009)
- "Öisin olemme samanlaisia" (2011), poetry collection
- "Ivana B."
- "Pääoma"

== Awards and honours ==
- Pro Finlandia Medal, 2007
