= Kuumaa =

Finnish musical group

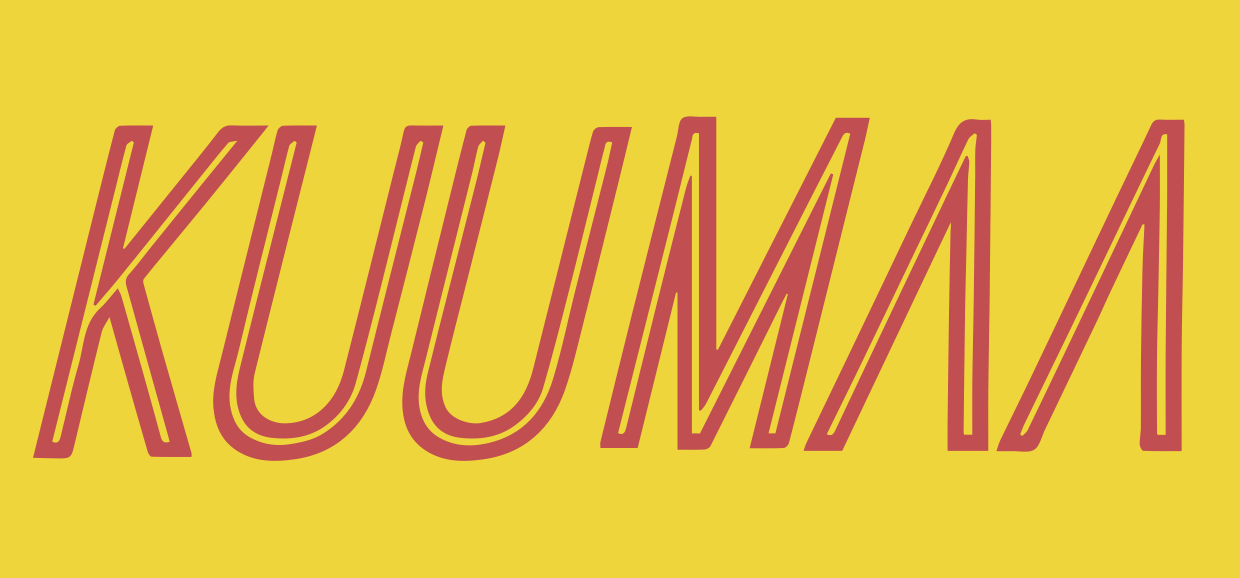
- The band's logo

Background information
- Origin: Helsinki, Finland
- Genres: Pop
- Years active: 2016–present
- Label: Universal Music Group
- Members: Johannes Brotherus; Jonttu Luhtavaara; Aarni Soivio; Okko Saastamoinen
- Past members: Aapo Närhi; Antti Heiskala
- Website: https://www.kuumaakuumaa.fi

Kuumaa is a Finnish pop band founded in 2016 in Helsinki, Finland. They released their first self-titled album Kuumaa in April 2019 and have since become one of the most popular bands in Finland with close to 150 million streams and four released albums.

The band consists of singer Johannes Brotherus, drummer Jonttu Luhtavaara, bassist Aarni Soivio and keyboardist Okko Saastamoinen (live performances).

The band's most streamed songs are "Tulipalo" and "Ylivoimainen", which have both gathered over 30 million streams each and so streamed six times platinum.

== Career ==
=== Career beginnings and Kuumaa (2016–2019) ===
The band signed a record deal with Universal Music Group based on their first demo in October 2016. Kuumaa was also signed to perform at the 2017 Provinssirock music festival before even releasing any music. At the time of the performance, the band had released their first single "Uppoon suhun", which was released in May 2017. The band released the song "Hulluista runoista" as their second single in July 2017. The demo version of this song had led to their record deal. After a total of six single releases between 2017 and 2019, the band's debut album Kuumaa was released on 26 April 2019. The album has since received the gold record certificate and the most listened song of the album is "Siks kai mä oon sun".

=== Single releases, UMK and Hyvikset ja pahikset (2020–2023) ===
After their debut album, Kuumaa released several singles such as "Kolme toivetta" and "Tarkotin sua" between 2020 and 2021. The production style of the single releases varied, and for example the single "Rakastaja" caused discussion inside the group as to whether it fit the bands catalogue. The song was still released, and created new visibility to the group on TikTok.

At the time of the single release of "Älä sano sitä vielä" in 2020, the band made an unofficial world record of continuously playing a single song. The band performed the single for six hours at Mutterigalleria in Helsinki.

At the end of 2021, the first single of the upcoming album Hyvikset ja pahikset was released. The single, "Oo vielä sekunnin mun" was added to YleX and Radio Suomipop playlists and won the NRJ Hitti vai huti (Hit or miss) voting a historical 12 times in a row. The single has also crossed three times the platinum certificate limit with over 12 million streams.

In the summer of 2022, the second single of the new album "Tulipalo" was released. It is the band's most streamed song with over 30 million streams. At best, it reached number one on the Official Finnish Charts 9 times. It also won the Radio Suomirock vote for "Song of the Year" in 2022. The band released another single "Edelleen sua" in October 2022. The release wasn't as popular as its predecessor, but still has close to 7 million streams.

On 11 January 2023, Kuumaa was announced as one of the seven participants in Uuden Musiikin Kilpailu 2023, the Finnish national selection for the Eurovision Song Contest 2023. Their entry "Ylivoimainen" was released on 18 January 2023 and is also the last single of the album Hyvikset ja pahikset. In the UMK final, they finished in fifth place with a total of 107 points (63 points from the televote and 44 points from the juries). Despite the outcome of the competition, the song and participation to the contest greatly boosted the popularity of the band, especially in the "municipalities" according to the lead singer Johannes Brotherus. "Ylivoimainen" climbed to the top of The Official Finnish Charts in May 2023 and stayed number one for 12 consecutive weeks. The song has been streamed over 24 million times on Spotify and it won the "Radio Song of the Year" -award at the yearly RadioGaala event in April 2024.

Kuumaa won the 2023 Emma Gaala award for "Band of the Year".

On 30 March 2023, the band released their second studio album Hyvikset ja pahikset. After its release, the album has gathered over 80 million streams and so crossed 4 times the platinum record limit. Since the release, the album has reached number one on the Official Finnish Charts 20 times.

In 2023, Kuumaa played around 120 gigs around Finland.

=== Pisara meressä and arena tours (2024–present) ===
Kuumaa won the "Band of the Year" award for the second consecutive year at the 2024 Emma Gaala awards. The Hyvikset ja pahikset album released the previous year also won three awards: "Album of the Year", "Pop of the Year" and "Best Seller of the Year".

Their third studio album Pisara meressä was released on 19 April 2024 and upon its release also reached number one of The Official Finnish Charts, topping the list for four weeks. The album launch event on 26 April sold out the Helsinki Ice Hall.

In the summer 2024, Kuumaa performed at several music festivals in Finland such as Provinssi, Ruisrock, Ilosaarirock, Qstock, Kesärauha, Himos Juhannus, Tahko Juhannus and Tammerfest.

The band started their first arena tour Maasta kuuhun in November 2024, finishing on 22 November at the Nokia Arena in Tampere. Following the tour, the band intends to take a break from performing until summer 2025.

== Members ==
=== Current members ===
- Johannes Brotherus – vocals
- Jonttu Luhtavaara – drums
- Aarni Soivio – bass
- Okko Saastamoinen – keyboards (2022–present, live performances)

=== Past members ===
- Aapo Närhi – guitar (2016–2021)
- Antti Heiskala – keyboards (2016–2022)

== Discography ==
=== Studio albums ===
Title	Details	Peak chart positions
Title	Details	FIN
Kuumaa	Released: 26 April 2019; Format: Digital; Label: Universal Music Group	10
Hyvikset ja pahikset	Released: 30 March 2023; Label: Universal Music Group	1
Pisara meressä	Released: 19 April 2024; Label: Universal Music Group	1
Valoa varten	Released: 13 February 2026; Label: Universal Music Group	1

=== Singles ===
Title	Year	Peak chart positions	Album
Title	Year	FIN	Album
"Uppoon suhun"	2017	—	Kuumaa
"Hulluista runoista"	2017	—	Non-album single
"Huuda lujempaa"	2017	—	Kuumaa
"Kuumaa"	2018	—	Kuumaa
"Mun pitäis se jo tietää" (featuring Sonny)	2018	—	Kuumaa
"Siks kai mä oon sun"	2019	—	Kuumaa
"Romuna"	2020	—	Non-album singles
"Rakastaja"	2020	—	Non-album singles
"Sä pilasit laulut"	2020	—	Non-album singles
"Älä sano sitä vielä"	2020	—	Non-album singles
"Ikävä sua"	2021	—	Non-album singles
"Kolme toivetta"	2021	—	Non-album singles
"Tarkotin sua"	2021	—	Non-album singles
"Oo vielä sekunnin mun"	2021	20	Hyvikset ja pahikset
"Tulipalo"	2022	3	Hyvikset ja pahikset
"Edelleen sua"	2022	16	Hyvikset ja pahikset
"Ylivoimainen"	2023	1	Hyvikset ja pahikset
"Tässä on kaikki"	2023	3	Pisara meressä
"Satama"	2023	4	Pisara meressä
"Tuhoaisti"	2024	5	Pisara meressä
"Pieni ystävä"	2025	17	Valoa varten
"Minä toivon" (Vain elämää kausi 16) (with Johannes Brotherus)	2025	8	Non-album singles
"Shampoota" (Vain elämää kausi 16) (with Johannes Brotherus)	2025	18	Non-album singles
"Asfaltin pinta" (Vain elämää kausi 16) (with Johannes Brotherus)	2025	35	Non-album singles
"Ota varovasti" (Vain elämää kausi 16) (with Johannes Brotherus)	2025	9	Non-album singles
"Valoa varten"	2025	12	Valoa varten
"Hyvänpäiväntutut"	2025	15	Valoa varten
"Ihan kohta ohi" (with Emma & Matilda)	2026	3	Valoa varten

=== Other charted songs ===
Title	Year	Peak chart positions	Album
Title	Year	FIN	Album
"Anna mulle mitä vaan"	2023	6	Hyvikset ja pahikset
"Eteisvalssi"	2023	29	Hyvikset ja pahikset
"Elokuva"	2023	31	Hyvikset ja pahikset
"Hyvikset ja pahikset"	2023	22	Hyvikset ja pahikset
"Hyvästejä ihanasti"	2023	47	Hyvikset ja pahikset
"Aaveisiin"	2024	28	Pisara meressä
"Kerran sadassa vuodessa"	2024	32	Pisara meressä
"Loppujen lopuks"	2024	41	Pisara meressä
"Luotan tulevaan"	2024	23	Pisara meressä
"Pisara meressä"	2024	8	Pisara meressä
"Suuren päivän ilta"	2024	27	Pisara meressä
"Täydellisin"	2024	22	Pisara meressä
"Valmiit"	2024	50	Pisara meressä
"Vaikeessa vaiheessa"	2026	21	Valoa varten
"Tuun viel himaan"	2026	11	Valoa varten
"Jälkeen sun"	2026	31	Valoa varten
"Keinut" (featuring Olga)	2026	29	Valoa varten
"Aloittelijat"	2026	22	Valoa varten
"Meille ei kävisi niin"	2026	44	Valoa varten
"Sä voit soittaa mulle"	2026	49	Valoa varten
"Älä muutu"	2026	48	Valoa varten
"Jos pääsen maaliin"	2026	50	Valoa varten
