= Simo Halinen =

Finnish filmmaker and author

Simo Halinen (born 1963) is a Finnish film director, screenwriter, actor and author.

== Education and Career ==
Halinen graduated from the School of Arts, Design and Architecture at Aalto University in 1995. Halinen released his first novel Idänsydänsimpukka in 2004 and a follow-up Lemmenomenia in 2008. He wrote and directed his first full-length feature film Cyclomania in 2001, and in 2013 he returned with Open Up to Me. In 2018 he released his third feature film Kääntöpiste (East of Sweden). In addition to his film work, Halinen has also written and directed for television. The latest work is a 4-part series The Girl Who Disappeared which is based on his own crime novel Nainen joka katosi.

== Selected filmography ==
- Variksenpelätti (1989)
- Vanhus näki unta leijonista (1990)
- Laihan miehen balladi (1993)
- Minerva (1997)
- Cyclomania (2001)
- Hokkasen näköinen nainen (tv series, 2004)
- Kultainen noutaja (tv series, 2007)
- Open Up to Me (2013)
- East of Sweden (2018)
- The Girl Who Disappeared (tv series, 2024)

== Novels ==
- Idänsydänsimpukka (2004)
- Lemmenomenia (2008)
- Nainen joka katosi (2022)
