= Whiskey on the Rocks =

Swedish historical satire television series

- Genre: Satire
- Created by: Henrik Jansson-Schweizer
- Written by: Jonas Jonasson; Henrik Jansson-Schweizer
- Directed by: Bjorn Stein
- Starring: Rolf Lassgård; Elsa Saisio; Anders Mossling; Niklas Engdahl; Filip Berg; Adam Lundgren; Kęstutis Jakštas; Mark Noble; Spencer MacIntyre
- Country of origin: Sweden
- Original language: Swedish
- No. of series: 1
- No. of episodes: 6

Production
- Executive producers: Henrik Jansson-Schweizer; Patrick Nebout; Magnus Bimberg; Anna Croneman; Sonja Hermele; Nanna Mailand-Mercado; Peter Zell
- Producer: Jan Marnell
- Production company: Humanoids

Original release
- Network: SVT1; Disney+
- Release: 25 December – 25 December 2024

Whiskey on the Rocks is a Swedish satirical television series based on a story by Jonas Jonasson and written by Henrik Jansson-Schweizer inspired by real-life events during the Cold War. From Sveriges Television, it is available internationally on Disney+ and Hulu (the latter with far fewer language options), from 22 January 2025.

== Premise ==
The series is based on a real-life incident in which Soviet submarine S-363 became beached on Swedish soil during the Cold War.

== Cast and characters ==
- Rolf Lassgård as Thorbjörn Fälldin
- Elsa Saisio as Aleksandra Kosygina
- Anders Mossling as Ola Ullsten
- Niklas Engdahl as Börje Lagerkrantz
- Filip Berg as Håkan Martinsson
- Adam Lundgren as Captain Hammerberg
- Kęstutis Jakštas as Leonid Brezhnev
- Mark Noble as Ronald Reagan
- Spencer MacIntyre as Chester Lang

== Production ==
=== Development ===
In 2020, production company Dramacorp began developing Cold War comedy drama series Whiskey On The Rocks based on a real-life 1981 incident. Initially conceived as a thriller, it developed into a comedy drama with the input of writer Jonas Jonasson. The series is directed by Björn Stein and produced by Henrik Jansson-Schweizer and Patrick Nebout with Magnus Bimberg’s Humanoids. A series order from Swedish public broadcaster Sveriges Television came in September 2022.

For Stein, the six-part series is not partisan; he says that "Swedes, Russians, Americans − there are idiots everywhere. We don’t have a political standpoint with this. It’s more like men with power abuse it repeatedly, and diplomacy is the way to go. That’s what we’re communicating". Some crew members were initially not told that the series was a comedy, with Stein saying the mentality and the approach was to be "the same as for a traditional spy thriller. By using this visual language, we can slide from the funny bits to the thrilling bits without changing costume, so to speak".

The cast includes Rolf Lassgård, Elsa Saisio, Anders Mossling, Niklas Engdahl, Filip Berg and Adam Lundgren, as well as Kęstutis Jakštas as Leonid Brezhnev and Mark Noble as Ronald Reagan.

Filming took place in Sweden and Lithuania in 2023.

== Release ==
The series had a Swedish premiere at the 35th Stockholm International Film Festival in 2024. It began airing on SVT1 in Sweden in December 2024. The series is available in the United States on Hulu and in the United Kingdom on streaming service Disney+ through the Star content hub from 22 January 2025. On October 24, 2025, the series won the 77th Prix Italia in the TV Drama category.
