= Johannes Brotherus =

Finnish actor and musician (born 1997)

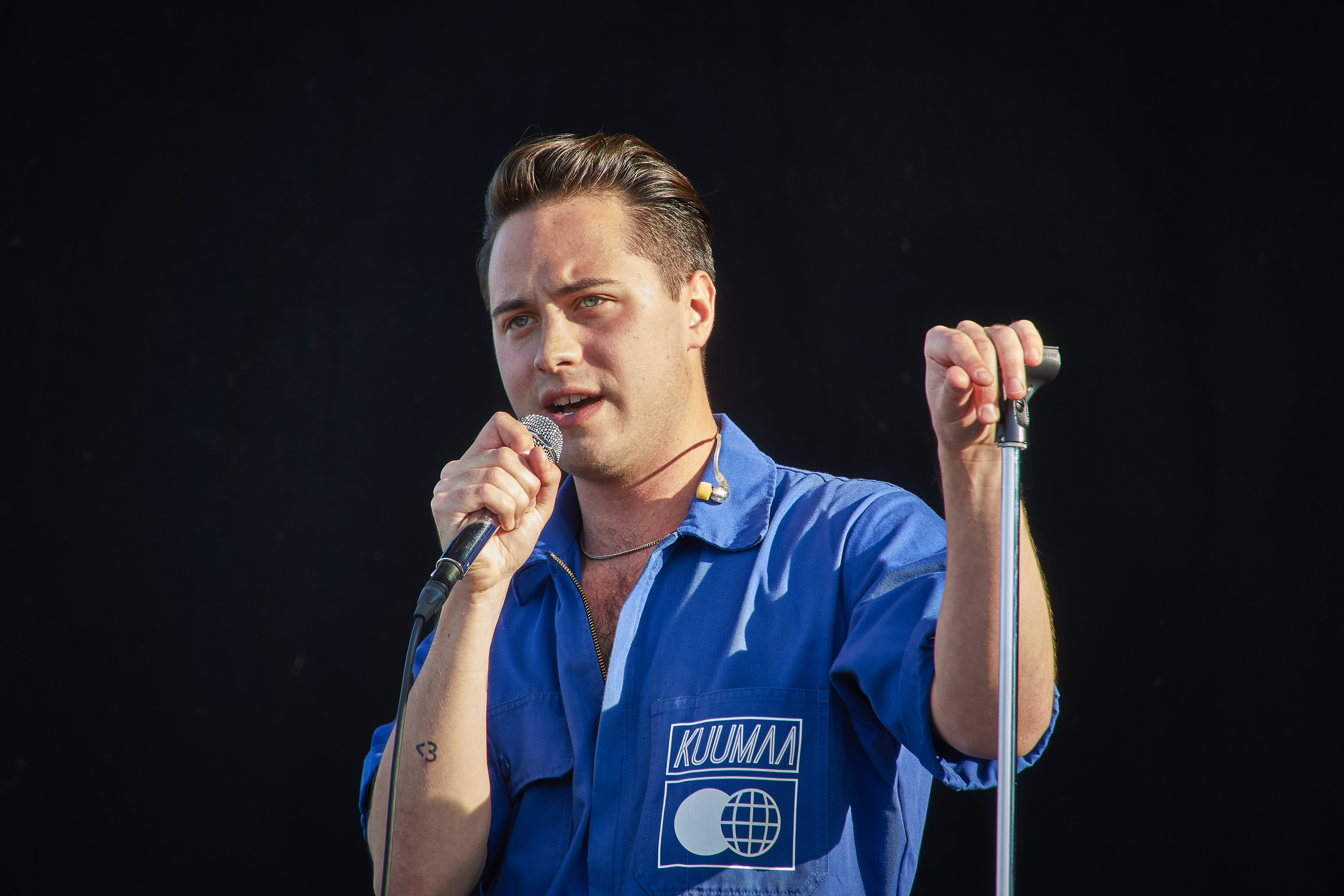
Brotherus in 2023

Johannes Brotherus (born 25 October 1997 in Helsinki) is a Finnish actor and musician. As an actor, he is best known for starring in the 2013 Pirjo Honkasalo film Concrete Night. He started playing violin at the age of three, and in addition to his acting career, also plays in the band Brotherus Brothers with his two brothers. He is a member of the pop band Kuumaa.

== Personal life ==
Brotherus' father is Antti Ikonen, ex-keyboard player for Stratovarius. His mother is a choreographer, Hanna Brotherus. He is the second child of four siblings, Robert Brotherus, actor Amos Brotherus, and actress-musician Elsa Brotherus.

== Filmography ==
- Concrete Night (2013)
- Urban Family (2015)
- Wildeye (2015)
