= Leea Klemola =

Finnish actress, director and playwright (born 1965)

Leea Elisabet Klemola (born 16 August 1965 in Veteli) is a Finnish actress, director and playwright. She studied at the Theatre Academy Helsinki 1987–1991 and has also been teaching acting.

== Career ==
Klemola has worked on stage and in films. She starred in two Auli Mantila films, Neitoperho (1997) and Pelon maantiede (1999), and most recently in Simo Halinen's film Open Up to Me (2013) in which she is portraying a woman who has just gone through a sex reassignment surgery. In her work, Klemola is often dealing with controversial subjects such as gender blending, forbidden love and sexuality.

== Selected filmography ==
- Talvisota (1989)
- Tuhlaajapoika (1992)
- Kuinka katosin karkkimaahan (1992)
- Kauhun millimetrit (1992)
- Kaivo (1992)
- P(l)ain Truth (1993)
- Neitoperho (1997)
- Pelon maantiede (1999)
- Lasileuka (2004)
- Miehen työ (2007)
- Skavabölen pojat (2009)
- Open Up to Me (2013)
- Wildeye (2015)
- The Worst Idea Ever (2023)
