= Seppo Ruohonen =

Finnish opera singer (1946–2020)

- Born: 25 April 1946; Turku, Finland
- Died: 1 March 2020 (aged 73); Vantaa, Finland
- Relatives: Matti and Teppo Ruohonen (brothers)
- Awards: Pro Finlandia (2011)

Seppo Ruohonen (25 April 1946 – 1 March 2020) was a Finnish operatic tenor and voice pedagogue.

== Education ==
Ruohonen trained initially under Lea Piltti, and later continued in Vienna at the Vienna State Opera school and the Hochschule für Musik und darstellende Kunst (now the University of Music and Performing Arts Vienna, where he obtained three separate degrees (opera, lied and oratorio, and voice), all with the highest available grade.

== Career ==
Ruohonen's professional debut came in Turku in 1969, singing Don José's role in Carmen. He was afterwards signed by the Finnish National Opera, where he performed a total of 23 roles, in nearly 250 performances. From 1978 to 1994 he was attached to Oper Frankfurt. He also had attachments to Vienna State Opera and Deutsche Oper Berlin. He furthermore appeared as guest in numerous productions in countries including the UK, France, Italy, USA and Russia, as well as at the Savonlinna Opera Festival. His career spanned over 40 years, and comprised over 100 major roles.

From 1999 to 2004, Ruohonen served as professor of opera coaching at the Sibelius Academy.

He also recorded extensively, across genres from opera and operetta to classical and religious music.

== Awards and honours ==
In 2011, Ruohonen received the Pro Finlandia medal of the Order of the Lion of Finland.

== Personal life ==
Seppo Ruohonen's younger brothers also sing professionally, as the pop and folk duo Matti ja Teppo. As children, they sang together at weddings and other events, and were later joined by future operatic bass Matti Salminen.

Ruohonen was nearly deaf in one ear, and would make sure to position himself on the stage so as to face the orchestra with his good ear.

He died in 2020 following a long battle with cancer; he was survived by wife and a daughter.
