= Ito: A Diary of an Urban Priest =

Ito – a Diary of an Urban Priest
- Directed by: Pirjo Honkasalo
- Distributed by: Cinema Mondo
- Release dates: September 2009 (Nordisk Panorama Film Festival); 12 November 2010
- Running time: 117 minutes
- Country: Finland

Ito – a Diary of an Urban Priest (Finnish: ITO – Seitti – Kilvoittelijan päiväkirja) is a 2009 documentary film by Finnish director Pirjo Honkasalo shot in Tokyo and portraying a young Buddhist priest, Yoshinobu Fujioka.
