= Kikka (singer) =

Finnish pop singer (1964–2005)

- Kikka in 1993

Background information
- Also known as: Kirsi Sirén
- Born: Kirsi Hannele Viilonen; 26 October 1964; Tampere, Finland
- Died: 3 December 2005 (aged 41) Nokia, Finland
- Genres: Pop, schlager, disco, funk
- Occupation: Singer
- Years active: 1984–2005

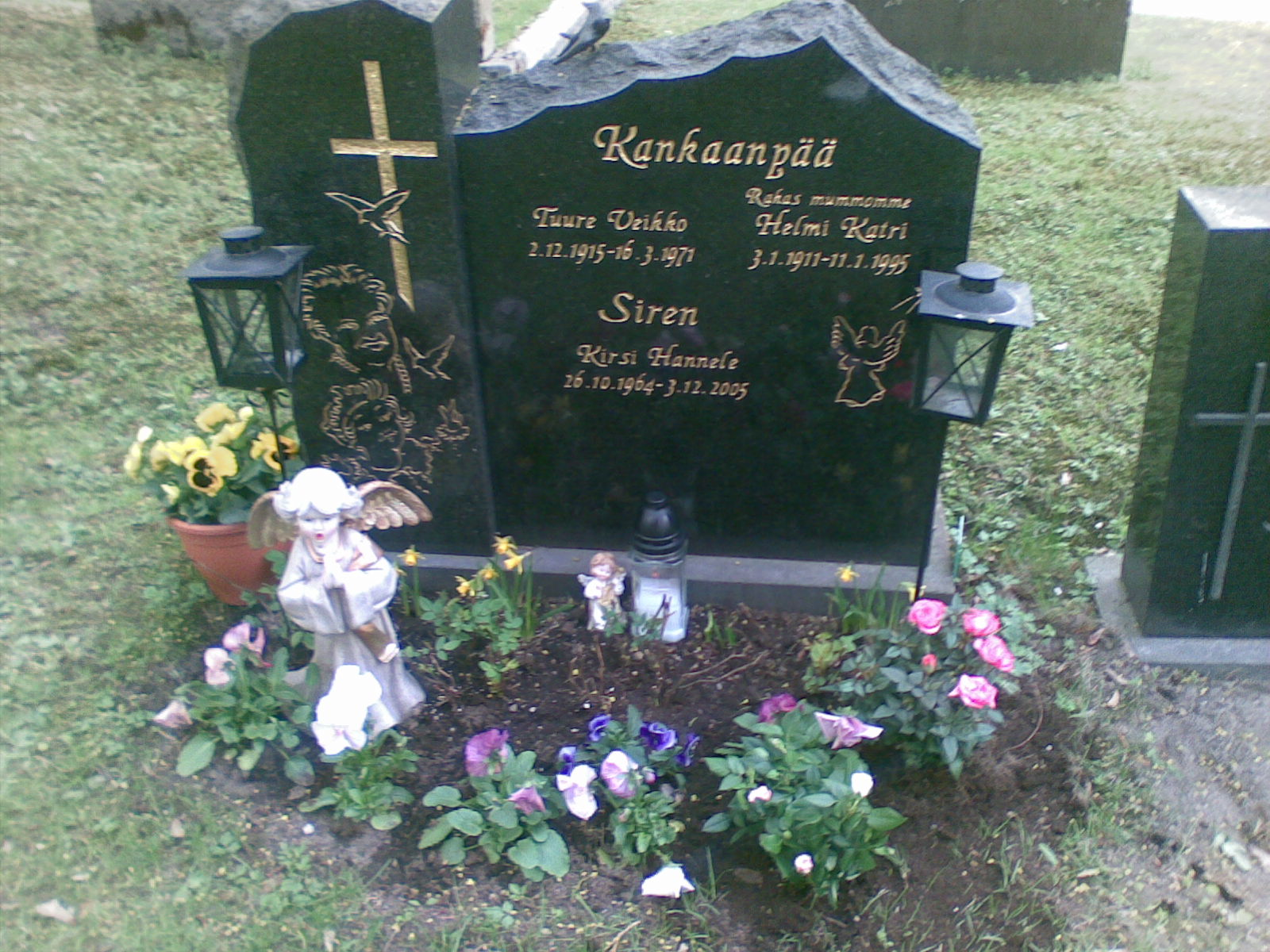
Kikka's (Kirsi Sirén) grave at the Kalevankangas Cemetery in Tampere

Kirsi Hannele Sirén (née Viilonen; 26 October 1964 – 3 December 2005), better known by her stage name Kikka, was a Finnish pop/schlager singer. She was known for her sexpot image and suggestive, double entendre-filled songs. Kikka's best-known songs were "Mä haluun viihdyttää" ("I Want to Entertain"), "Sukkula Venukseen" ("A Shuttle to Venus"), "Tartu tiukasti hanuriin" ("Grab the Accordion Firmly"; in Finnish slang the word hanuri often refers to the buttocks) and a cover of Ami Aspelund's "Apinamies" ("Ape man").

Kikka was born in Tampere. Her career was launched in the late 1980s, inspired by the success of international sexpot stars such as Samantha Fox and Italy's Sabrina Salerno. During her career, the media and many influential organisations even tried to market her as the "Samantha Fox of Finland", albeit against the singer's will. The peak of Kikka's popularity was in the late 1980s and early 1990s when she earned three platinum records and two gold records. In the 21st century, health problems and alcoholism were detrimental to the artist's career. According to the Finnish tabloid Iltalehti, the cause of her death in Nokia on 3 December 2005, at the age of 41, was a heart attack. Her death has also been attributed to her taking a mixture of different medicines and prescription drug, even if not with the intention of committing suicide.

In 2022, a biographical film about Kikka called Kikka! was directed by the Jussi-award-winning actress Anna Paavilainen and written by Maarit Nissilä. In the film, Kikka is played by Sara Melleri.

== Discography ==
Kikka at talk show in 1990

=== Albums ===
- Mä haluun viihdyttää (1989)
- Kiihkeät tuulet (1990)
- Kikka 3 (1991)
- Parhaat puoleni (1992)
- Käyrä nousemaan (1993)
- Ota vaatteet pois (1994)
- Kikka Remix (1995)
- Parhaat 20 suosikkisävelmää (1997)
- Herkut lisukkeineen (2000)
- Hitit (2002)
- Kaikkien aikojen parhaat (2CD) (2009)

== See also ==
- List of best-selling music artists in Finland
- Mona Carita
