= The Collector (1997 film) =

1997 film

- Original Finnish film poster
- Directed by: Auli Mantila
- Written by: Auli Mantila
- Produced by: Tero Kaukomaa
- Starring: Leea Klemola
- Cinematography: Heikki Färm
- Edited by: Riitta Poikselkä
- Music by: Risto Iissalo
- Distributed by: Finnkino Oy
- Release date: 31 October 1997
- Running time: 98 minutes
- Country: Finland
- Language: Finnish
- Budget: FIM 3,342,503

The Collector (Finnish: Neitoperho) is a 1997 Finnish drama film directed by Auli Mantila. The dark road movie tells the story of a work-avoiding woman who one day, out of frustration, steals the money from her sister and, with the help of a stolen car, sets off aimlessly to commit more crimes. According to director Mantila, the film was loosely inspired by is a 1963 thriller novel The Collector by John Fowles.

The film was selected as the Finnish entry for the Best Foreign Language Film at the 70th Academy Awards, but was not accepted, as a nominee.

== Cast ==
- Leea Klemola as Eevi
- Elina Hurme as Ami
- Rea Mauranen as Anja
- Henriikka Salo as Helena
- Robin Svartström as Jusu

== See also ==
- List of submissions to the 70th Academy Awards for Best Foreign Language Film
- List of Finnish submissions for the Academy Award for Best Foreign Language Film
