= Atman (1997 film) =

1997 documentary film

- Directed by: Pirjo Honkasalo
- Distributed by: Baabeli Ky
- Release date: 7 March 1997
- Running time: 76 minutes
- Country: Finland/Germany

Atman is a 1997 documentary film by Finnish director Pirjo Honkasalo about two Indian brothers on a pilgrimage. It is the final installment of Honkasalo's "Trilogy of the Sacred and the Satanic", preceded by Mysterion (1991) and Tanjuska and the 7 Devils (1993). Atman received the Joris Ivens Award at the International Documentary Film Festival Amsterdam.
