= The Midwife (2015 film) =

Finnish romantic war drama film

- Theatrical release poster
- Finnish: Kätilö
- Directed by: Antti Jokinen
- Written by: Antti Jokinen; Katja Kettu
- Based on: Kätilö by Katja Kettu
- Produced by: Markus Selin; Jukka Helle
- Starring: Krista Kosonen; Lauri Tilkanen
- Cinematography: Rauno Ronkainen
- Edited by: Benjamin Mercer
- Music by: Pessi Levanto
- Production company: Solar Films
- Distributed by: Nordisk Film
- Release date: 4 September 2015
- Running time: 119 minutes
- Country: Finland
- Languages: Finnish, German, Russian

The Midwife (Finnish: Kätilö), also known as Finland 1944 and by its working title Wildeye, is a 2015 Finnish romantic war drama film directed by Antti Jokinen. It is an adaptation of Finnish author Katja Kettu's bestselling 2011 novel The Midwife (Kätilö) set before and during Lapland War. The film stars Krista Kosonen and Lauri Tilkanen with Pirkka-Pekka Petelius, Leea Klemola, Seppo Pääkkönen, Elina Knihtilä, Tommi Korpela, and Johannes Brotherus in supporting roles. The film tells the story about a love affair between a Lapp midwife and a SS officer set against the backdrop of the Lapland War, which opposed Finnish and German armies in 1944–45. The film won the Best Film and the Best Actress awards at the 2015 Waterloo International Historical Film Festival and the Best Actress award at the 2015 Shanghai International Film Festival.

== Cast ==
- Krista Kosonen as Helena
- Lauri Tilkanen as Johannes
- Pirkka-Pekka Petelius as Jouni
- Leea Klemola as Aune
- Seppo Pääkkönen as Björne
- Elina Knihtilä as Heta
- Tommi Korpela as a Nazi SS officer Gödel
- Johannes Brotherus as Aleksei

== Production ==
Principal photography began in Lithuania on 13 May 2014. Krista Kosonen who plays female lead, Helena, cut her hair on camera for the role. She also learned Finnish dialect from Katja Kettu's novel. Many cast members change their physical appearances; Tommi Korpela lost 44 pounds for his role as a SS officer; Elina Knihtilä lost 22 pounds for her character Heta, prisoner of war. On 10 April 2015 Jokinen informed in an interview that the production of the film was finished and that the film was complete.

== Accolades ==
Award	Date	Category	Recipients	Result	Ref.
Golden Goblet Award for Best Actress	21 June 2015	Best Actress	Krista Kosonen	Won	
