= Sara Melleri =

Finnish actress and singer (born 1986)

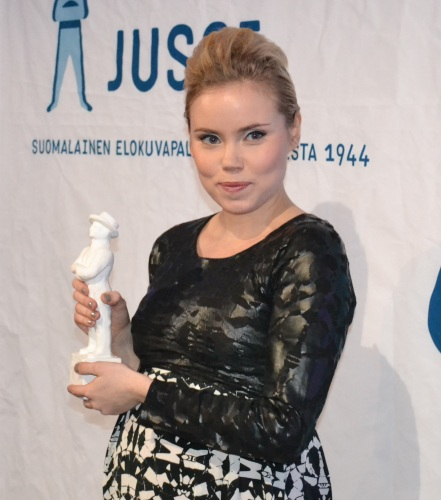
- Melleri at the 2011 Jussi Awards
- Born: 14 February 1986 (age 40); Turku, Finland
- Occupations: actress; singer
- Years active: 2001–present

Sara Melleri (born 14 February 1986) is a Finnish actress and singer.

== Early life ==
Melleri was born to writer Arto Melleri, and actress Kaija Kangas. She is also the niece of Yle's former news manager Jorma Melleri. Melleri attended Kallio Upper Secondary School and began acting at the Helsinki Theatre Academy in 2005, where she graduated with a Master of Theater Arts in the spring of 2011.

== Career ==
In theater, Melleri has portrayed Lady Macduff's in the play Macbeth at Q-teatteri from 2008 to 2009 and Wendla Bergman, one of the main characters, in the musical Spring Awakening at the Helsinki City Theatre in 2009. In November 2013, her directorial debut, Pop Slut, premiered at Koko Theatre.

Melleri has starred in five feature films, Young Gods (2003), Matti: Hell Is for Heroes (2005), Ganes (2007) and Vuonna 85 (2013), and another lead role, Siiri, in Sisko tahtoisin jäädä in 2010. She received the Jussi Award for Best Actress for her role. Melleri has also acted on television, including the lead role in Yle TV2's 12-part series Rakastuin mä luuseriin (2005). Melleri got her first film in a starring role in the film Kikka!, in which she portrayed pop/schlager singer Kikka. The film premiered in 2022.

From 2005 to 2008, Melleri was the singer of the band Gris and from 2001 to 2003, she hosted Yle TV1's youth magazine program Iines. Gris released the album Is Impossible It Better This Way in 2006.

== Personal life ==
Melleri gave birth her first child in the spring of 2011.
