= Open Up to Me =

- Theatrical poster
- Directed by: Simo Halinen
- Written by: Simo Halinen
- Produced by: Liisa Penttilä
- Starring: Leea Klemola; Peter Franzén
- Cinematography: Henrik Blomberg
- Edited by: Jussi Rautaniemi
- Music by: Jarmo Saari
- Production company: Edith Film Oy
- Distributed by: Future Film Oy
- Release date: 8 March 2013
- Running time: 95 minutes
- Country: Finland
- Language: Finnish

Open Up to Me (Finnish: Kerron sinulle kaiken) is a 2013 Finnish film directed and written by Simo Halinen. It tells a story of Maarit (Leea Klemola), a woman who has just gone through a sex reassignment surgery. She wants to rebuild her relationship to her teenage daughter and is also looking for a man to share her life with. The film was nominated for the 2013 Nordic Council Film Prize.

== Reception ==
The film has received favorable reviews. While some writers have criticized the story for not having enough twists and turns, the work of actors has been praised almost unanimously. On 2 February 2014, Open Up to Me received two Jussi Awards; one for Leea Klemola (Best Actress in a Leading Role) and another for Halinen (Best Screenplay).

== Main cast ==
- Leea Klemola as Maarit
- Peter Franzén as Sami
- Ria Kataja as Julia
- Emmi Nivala as Pinja
- Alex Anton as Teo
- Maria Heiskanen as Silva
- Olavi Uusivirta as Hatakka
