= Tanjuska and the 7 Devils =

- Directed by: Pirjo Honkasalo
- Distributed by: Baabeli Ky
- Release date: 12 March 1993
- Running time: 80 minutes
- Countries: Finland; Sweden

Tanjuska and the 7 Devils (Finnish: Tanjuska ja 7 perkelettä) is a 1993 documentary film by Finnish director Pirjo Honkasalo about a ten-year-old Belarusian girl who is believed to have been possessed by the devil. It is the second part of Honkasalo's "Trilogy of the Sacred and the Satanic", preceded by Mysterion (1991) and followed by Atman (1997). The film won several international awards, including the International Jury Award at the Bombay International Film Festival.
