= Stop Nyqvist =

- Genre: Satire; Black comedy; Dramedy
- Written by: Heikki Heiskanen; Teemu Kaskinen
- Directed by: Juha Lankinen
- Starring: Antti Tuomas Heikkinen; Marc Gassot; Sonja Kuittinen; Jarkko Pajunen
- Music by: Timo Hietala
- Country of origin: Finland
- Original language: Finnish
- No. of seasons: 1
- No. of episodes: 8

Production
- Producers: Liisa Palmroth; Pekka Ruohoranta
- Cinematography: Harri Halonen
- Editor: Jari Heikkinen
- Running time: 37–44 min
- Production company: Yle Draama

Original release
- Release: 10 June – 3 July 2022

Stop Nyqvist (Finnish: Pysäyttäkää Nyqvist) is a Finnish satirical comedy series that premiered on Yle in the summer of 2022. The series addresses Finland's efforts to join NATO, hybrid warfare, Finlandization, and bureaucratic scheming. The main character, Aleksis Nyqvist, is an inept intern at the Ministry of Foreign Affairs who unexpectedly gets promoted to lead a new Baltic Sea unit. Nyqvist is portrayed by Antti Tuomas Heikkinen, with Marc Gassot, Sonja Kuittinen, and Jarkko Pajunen in supporting roles.

The series was originally planned to air in May 2022, with marketing scheduled to begin in February. However, following the Russian invasion of Ukraine, the plans were postponed. The series was eventually made available on Yle Areena on June 10, 2022, and premiered on television on June 12, 2022.

The series was written by Heikki Heiskanen and Teemu Kaskinen, and directed by Juha Lankinen. Writing began seven years earlier. According to Kaskinen, the inspiration for the series came from exploring how badly things can go wrong when organizations start believing in their own narratives. He also wanted to parody spy thrillers and Nordic noir. Filming took place in Helsinki and Imatra.

== Cast ==
- Antti Tuomas Heikkinen as Aleksis Nyqvist
- Sonja Kuittinen as Helena Nyqvist
- Marc Gassot as Härkönen
- Jarkko Pajunen as Rautakorpi
- Minna Suuronen as Parikka
- Robert Enckell as Eronen
- Ilkka Koivula as Matilainen
- Jukka Puotila as Carl-Kristian Nyqvist
- Saana Koivisto as Jenniina Miettinen
- Andrea Björkholm as Bergenskjöld
- Peter Kanerva as Bodin
- Darren McStay as Kirkpatrick
- Viktor Drevitski as Grigorjev
- Erick King as U.S. Ambassador
- Amira Khalifa as Haataja
- Marja Salo as Vestbacka-Salolainen
- Elsa Saisio as Väänänen
- Karoliina Blackburn as President
