= Glass Jaw =

- Directed by: Zaida Bergroth
- Written by: Zaida Bergroth
- Produced by: Anu Heiskanen; Anu Lyra
- Starring: Emilia Sinisalo
- Cinematography: Anu Keränen
- Edited by: Oskar Franzen
- Music by: Olli Kykkänen
- Release date: 4 March 2004
- Running time: 38 minutes
- Country: Finland
- Language: Finnish

Glass Jaw (Original title: Lasileuka) is a 2004 Finnish short drama film directed by Zaida Bergroth and starring Emilia Sinisalo.

== Plot summary ==
Teenage Marianne and her little sister live with their alcoholic mother. The social service wants to get hold of them.

== Cast ==
- Emilia Sinisalo as Marianne
- Leea Klemola as Gunni
- Tiina Puntala as Emilia
- Jarkko Niemi as Remu
- Tommy Sklavos as Peter

== Production ==
This film was director Zaida Bergroth's diploma work for University of Art and Design Helsinki, School of Motion picture, Television and Production design (UIAH).

=== Awards ===
The film won a Special Prize for "Finnish Short Film Over 30 Minutes" at the 2004 Tampere International Short Film Festival.
