= SkyWheel Helsinki =

Ferris wheel in Helsinki

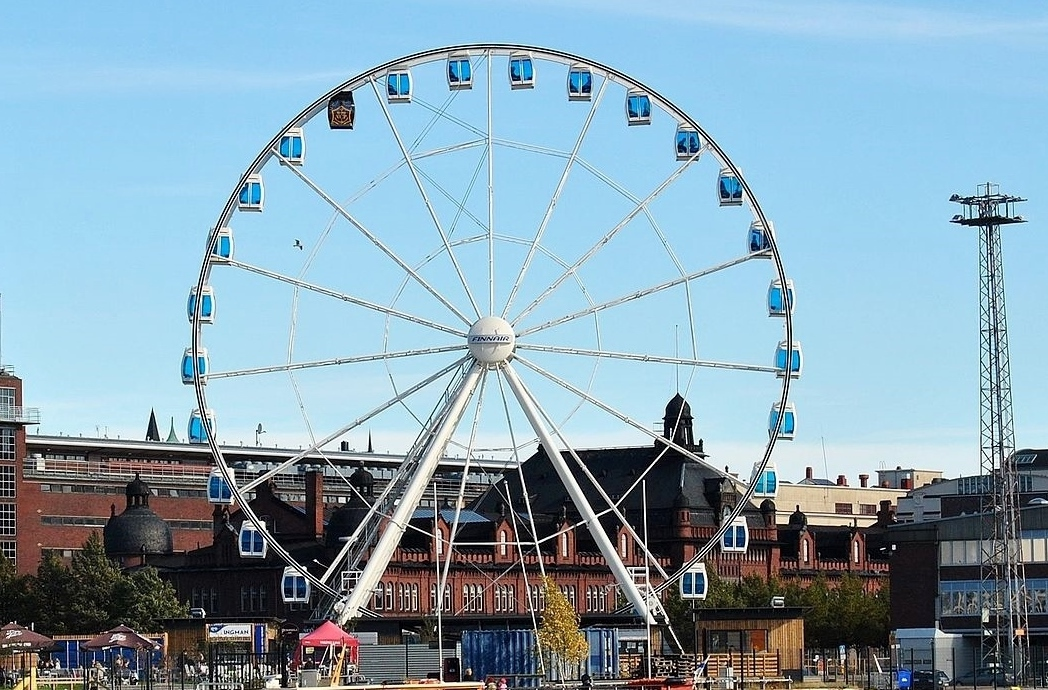
- Interactive map of the SkyWheel Helsinki area
- Former names: Finnair SkyWheel

General information
- Status: Operating
- Type: Ferris wheel
- Location: Helsinki, Finland, Katajanokanlaituri 2
- Coordinates: 60°10′1.8″N 24°57′35.2″E
- Opened: June 3, 2014; 12 years ago
- Owner: Skywheel Helsinki Oy

Height
- Height: 40 m (131 ft)

Website
- http://skywheel.fi/en/

SkyWheel Helsinki is a 40-meter (131 feet) tall Ferris wheel in central Helsinki, Finland. One of its gondola cabins, the SkySauna, is the world's first sauna on a Ferris wheel. It opened to the public on June 3, 2014. It was originally named the Finnair SkyWheel and its placement on Katajanokka harbor is where the airline Finnair first located its flight operations in the 1920s.

== Design ==
The Netherlands-based Dutch Wheels designed and constructed the wheel. It is a model R40. It has 30 climate controlled gondolas, allowing the wheel to operate year-round. Of these, 29 blue-and-white gondolas can accommodate six people, except for the VIP gondola which can accommodate four. The wood paneled SkySauna gondola can hold up to five people. The VIP gondola features a glass floor and leather chairs.
