= Auli Mantila =

Finnish filmmaker (born 1964)

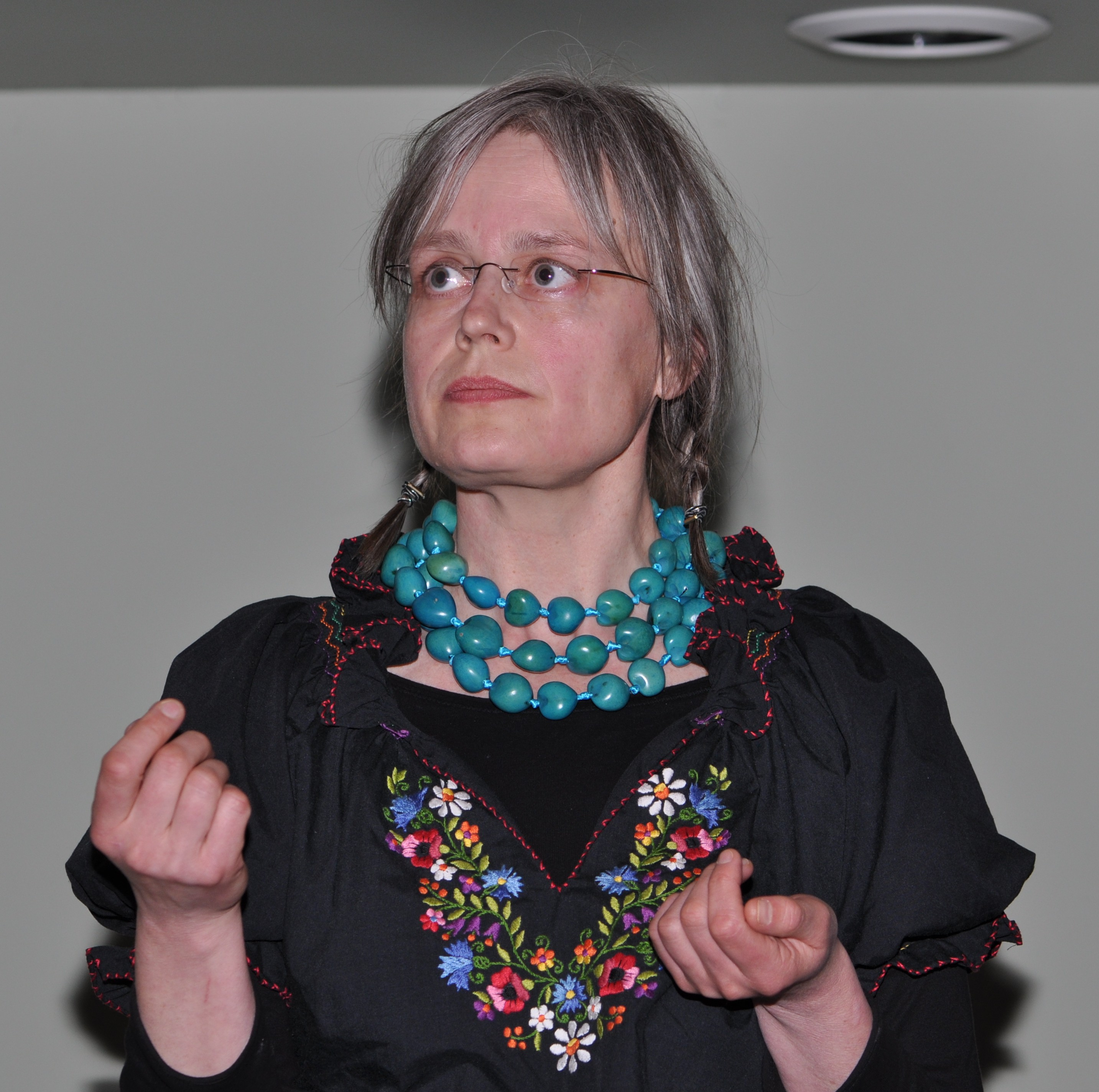
Mantila in 2009

Auli Mantila (born 27 May 1964) is a Finnish film director, writer, producer and actress.

== Career ==
Mantila is best known for having directed the films The Collector (1997), Geography of Fear (2000) and Ystäväni Henry (2004). In addition, she has appeared as an actress in Juho Kuosmanen's film Taulukauppiaat (2010). In October 2008, she won a Prix Europa trophy for best drama series for directing a television series Hopeanuolet. Mantila's first novel Varpunen was published in 2005. She has also written and directed for Finnish radio.

Originally Auli Mantila studied to become a class teacher, but soon switched to art education. In recent years, she has mostly worked as a producer and a consultant for a number of short subjects and documentaries. In 2011, Arts Council of Finland nominated Mantila as Artist Professor of Film Art for the period of 2012–2016.

== Style ==
Mantila has stated that her work as a director has helped her to get to know more of human nature. Through her work, she also aims to help people put their best foot forward.

== Selected filmography ==
- Marja (1994)
- The Collector (1997)
- Geography of Fear (1999)
- Ystäväni Henry (2004)
- Yksinen (2008)
- Kaupunkilaisia (2008)
