= Matti ja Teppo =

Finnish schlager duo

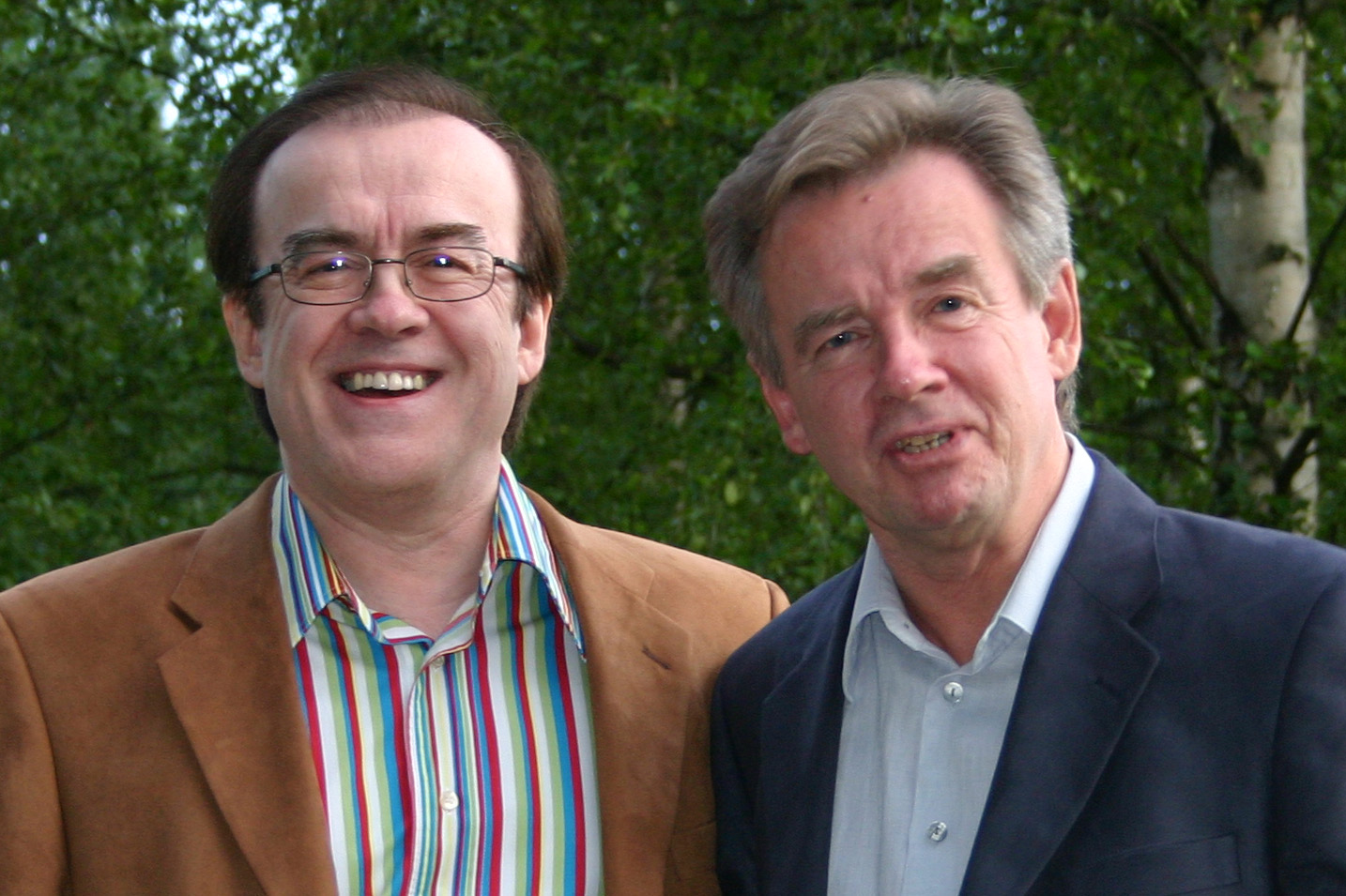

Background information
- Origin: Turku, Finland
- Genres: iskelmä, schlager, pop
- Years active: 1972–present
- Labels: M & T Production
- Members: Matti Tapio Ruohonen; Teppo Ilmari Ruohonen
- Website: www.mattijateppo.fi/

Matti ja Teppo is a Finnish schlager duo made up of brothers Matti Tapio Ruohonen (born in Turku, Finland on 8 August 1949) and Teppo Ilmari Ruohonen (also born in Turku, on 1 March 1948) who have performed together since childhood.

The duo studied violin and piano in their hometown Turku. Matti also studied guitar and songwriting, whereas Teppo became a lyricist. In 1972, the duo released their debut album, the self-titled album Matti ja Teppo. They established their own record label "M & T Production" in 1975 and have become one of the biggest selling artists in Finland, with many famous songs like "Kissankultaa", "Et voi tulla rajan taa", "Mä joka päivä töitä teen", "Ensimmäinen", "Kaiken takana on nainen", "Mä tanssin hullun lailla" and "Näitä polkuja tallaan". Many of their albums have been certified gold and platinum.

Their older brother was the operatic tenor and voice pedagog Seppo Ruohonen (1946–2020).

== Discography ==
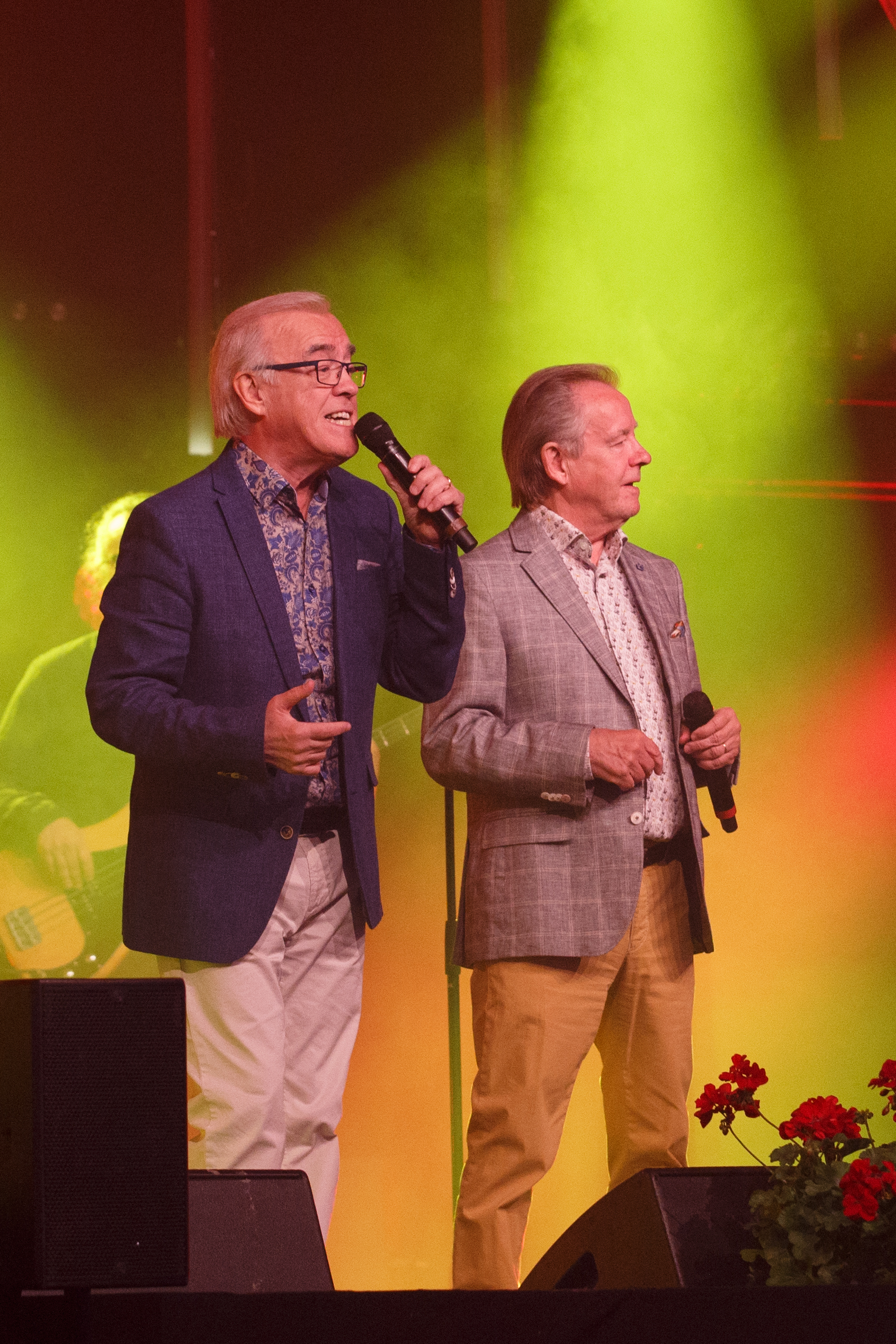
Matti and Teppo in 2019

=== Albums ===
- 1972: Matti ja Teppo
- 1975: Ota kiinni
- 1976: Cara mia
- 1977: Sait mitä hait
- 1981: Et voi tulla rajan taa
- 1982: Pidä itsestäsi huolta
- 1983: Minuun voit luottaa
- 1984: Kuulut aikaan parhaimpaan
- 1984: Lauluja sinulle
- 1986: Matti & Teppo
- 1987: Matti ja Teppo '87
- 1989: Aito tunne
- 1989: Joulu on rakkautta
- 1990: Suuret valssisuosikit
- 1991: Taivaan merkit
- 1992: Jää mun luo
- 1994: Kaikki peliin
- 1995: Suuret valssisuosikit 2
- 1995: Toivon ja hiljaisuuden lauluja
- 1997: Luotuja kulkemaan
- 1998: Suuret valssisuosikit 3
- 1999: Toivon ja hiljaisuuden lauluja 2
- 2001: Ensimmäinen
- 2003: Hänelle
- 2004: Joulun aika
- 2006: Pöytä täyteen
- 2006: Toivon ja hiljaisuuden lauluja 3
- 2008: Satoi tai paistoi
- 2010: Peruskallio
- 2012: Meidän paikka
- 2014: Yksinoikeudella
- 2015: 45 V. Juhlalevy
- 2017: Nostalgiaa
- 2019: Enemmän

Compilations

- 1979: Täyskymppi 1969–1979
- 1985: Parhaat 1
- 1986: Parhaat 2
- 1991: Kaksi alkuperäistä: Pidä itsestäsi huolta / Minuun voit luottaa
- 1993: Vauhti kiihtyy
- 2001: Kaikki hitit
- 2002: Kaikkien aikojen valssisuosikit
- 2002: Näin se kesäloma toimii
- 2004: 35. vuotisjuhlalevy
- 2009: 40. vuotisjuhlalevy
- 2015: 45 V. Juhlalevy
- 2019: 50 v. juhlalevy

== See also ==
- List of best-selling music artists in Finland
