= Pirkko Saisio =

Finnish author, actress and director (born 1949)

- Pirkko Saisio (2025)
- Born: 16 April 1949 (age 77); Helsinki, Finland
- Education: Theatre Academy
- Occupations: author, actress, director
- Spouse: Pirjo Honkasalo
- Children: Elsa Saisio
- Awards: J. H. Erkko Award (1975); Finlandia Prize (2003); Pro Finlandia (2007)

Pirkko Helena Saisio (born 16 April 1949) is a Finnish author, actress and director. She has also written under the pen names Jukka Larsson and Eva Wein. Saisio has a broad literary output, dealing with many kinds of texts from film screenplays all the way to librettos for the ballet. Her novel Betoniyö (1981) was adapted into a feature film Concrete Night in 2013 by Pirjo Honkasalo.

== Biography ==
Saisio received her degree in acting from Suomen teatterikoulu (now Theatre Academy) in 1975 and worked there as a professor of dramaturgy in 1997 and 2001. In 1975, she won the J. H. Erkko Award for her debut novel Elämänmeno.

== Personal life ==
Saisio's daughter, whose father is the late Harri Hyttinen, is actress Elsa Saisio. Pirkko Saisio lives in a same-sex partnership with film director Pirjo Honkasalo.

== Bibliography ==
=== Prose ===
==== Under her own name ====
- Elämänmeno. Helsinki: Kirjayhtymä, 1975. ISBN 978-951-26-1117-1.
- Sisarukset. Helsinki: Kirjayhtymä, 1976. ISBN 978-951-26-1251-2.
- Kadonnut aurinko: Kaksinäytöksinen teatteriromaani. Helsinki: Kirjayhtymä, 1979. ISBN 978-951-26-1698-5.
- Betoniyö. Helsinki: Kirjayhtymä, 1981. ISBN 978-951-26-2136-1.
- Kainin tytär. Helsinki: Kirjayhtymä, 1984. ISBN 978-951-26-2597-0.
- Exit: Lyhytproosaa matkoilta maassa ja mielessä. Helsinki: Kirjayhtymä, 1987. ISBN 978-951-26-2602-1.
- Pienin yhteinen jaettava. Helsinki: WSOY, 1998. ISBN 978-951-0-23016-9.
- Vastavalo. Helsinki: WSOY, 2000. ISBN 978-951-0-25423-3.
- Punainen erokirja. Helsinki: WSOY, 2003. ISBN 978-951-0-28237-3.
- Voimattomuus. Helsinki: WSOY, 2005. ISBN 978-951-0-30789-2.
- Kohtuuttomuus: Toisen miehen muistelmat. Helsinki: Siltala, 2008. ISBN 978-952-234-000-9.
- Lokikirja. Helsinki: Siltala, 2010. ISBN 978-952-234-037-5.
- Signaali. Helsinki: Siltala, 2014. ISBN 978-952-234-235-5.
- Mies, ja hänen asiansa. Helsinki: Siltala, 2016. ISBN 978-952-234-372-7.
- Spuuki spaidermän ja raju nonna. Helsinki: Siltala, 2017. ISBN 978-952-234-431-1.
- Epäröintejä: Tunnustuksia rakkaudesta, kirjoittamisesta ja esiintymisestä. Helsinki: Siltala, 2019. ISBN 978-952-234-584-4.
- Passio. Helsinki: Siltala, 2021. ISBN 978-952-234-928-6.

==== Under the name of Jukka Larsson ====
- Kiusaaja. Helsinki: WSOY, 1986. ISBN 978-951-0-13916-5.
- Viettelijä. Helsinki: WSOY, 1987. ISBN 978-951-0-14713-9.
- Kantaja. Helsinki: WSOY, 1991. ISBN 978-951-0-17474-6.
- Kärsimystrilogia. Collection of the three novels Kiusaaja, Viettelijä, Kantaja. With a postface by Pirkko Saision. Kotimaiset valiot. Helsinki: WSOY, 1993. ISBN 978-951-0-18740-1.

==== Under the name of Eva Wein ====
- Puolimaailman nainen: Kirjallinen omakuva. Helsinki: Kirjayhtymä, 1990. ISBN 978-951-26-3474-3.
- Kulkue: Vaellusfresko. Helsinki: Kirjayhtymä, 1992. ISBN 978-951-26-3759-1.

=== Plays ===
- Suomi-neito ja kosija (1976), miniature opera libretto
- Sisarukset (1977), TV adaptation
- Juhannushäät (1979), TV play
- Maailman laidalla (1979), play
- Betoniyö (1982), TV adaptation
- Hävinneiden legenda (1985), play
- Hissi (1986), play
- Leonardon ikkunat (1987), TV play
- Mies ja nainen (1987), play
- Hernando ja jumalankantajat (1988), play
- Mutsi, mä diggaan huijaria (1990), miniature musical
- Voima (1991), musical play
- Yöihminen (1991), miniature musical
- Törmäys (1992), theater fresco
- Pula-ajan Cats (1993), miniature musical
- Nyrkkeilijät (1993), TV play
- Voiton päivä (1994), play
- Ihana ihminen (1994), play
- Kabaree Kristiina (1995), six-part cabaret series
- Veera, Verotska! (1996), play
- Toni Tiikeri (1996), TV play
- Kuuhullut (1997), Musical play
- Ihmisiä isompi asia (1997), a three-part television movie
- Kristiina H, 44, elämäsi on unta (1998), play
- Tänään on se ilta (2002), TV play
- Baikalin lapset (2002), play
- Tunnottomuus (2003), play
- Virhe (2005), play
- Sorsastaja (ensi-ilta 10.3.2006), play
- Kuume (2007), comedic play
- HOMO! (2011), play
- Syvin kerros (2012), play
- SLAVA! Kunnia. (2015), play

=== TV Shows ===
- Elämänmeno (1976), based on the novel Elämänmeno
- Tehdas (2012–)

=== Miscellaneous works ===
- Leonardo (1991), Balett Libretto
- Rakastuneet lapset (1992), Singing Program
- Leonardo (1996), Balett Libretto
- Tulennielijä (1998), Film Script
- Näkyykö tähtiä? ja muita nykynäytelmiä. Toimite. Elektra. Helsinki: Like, 2000. ISBN 978-951-578-824-5.
- Betoniyö (2013), film script (together with Pirjo Honkasalon)
