= Pirjo Honkasalo =

Finnish film director (born 1947)

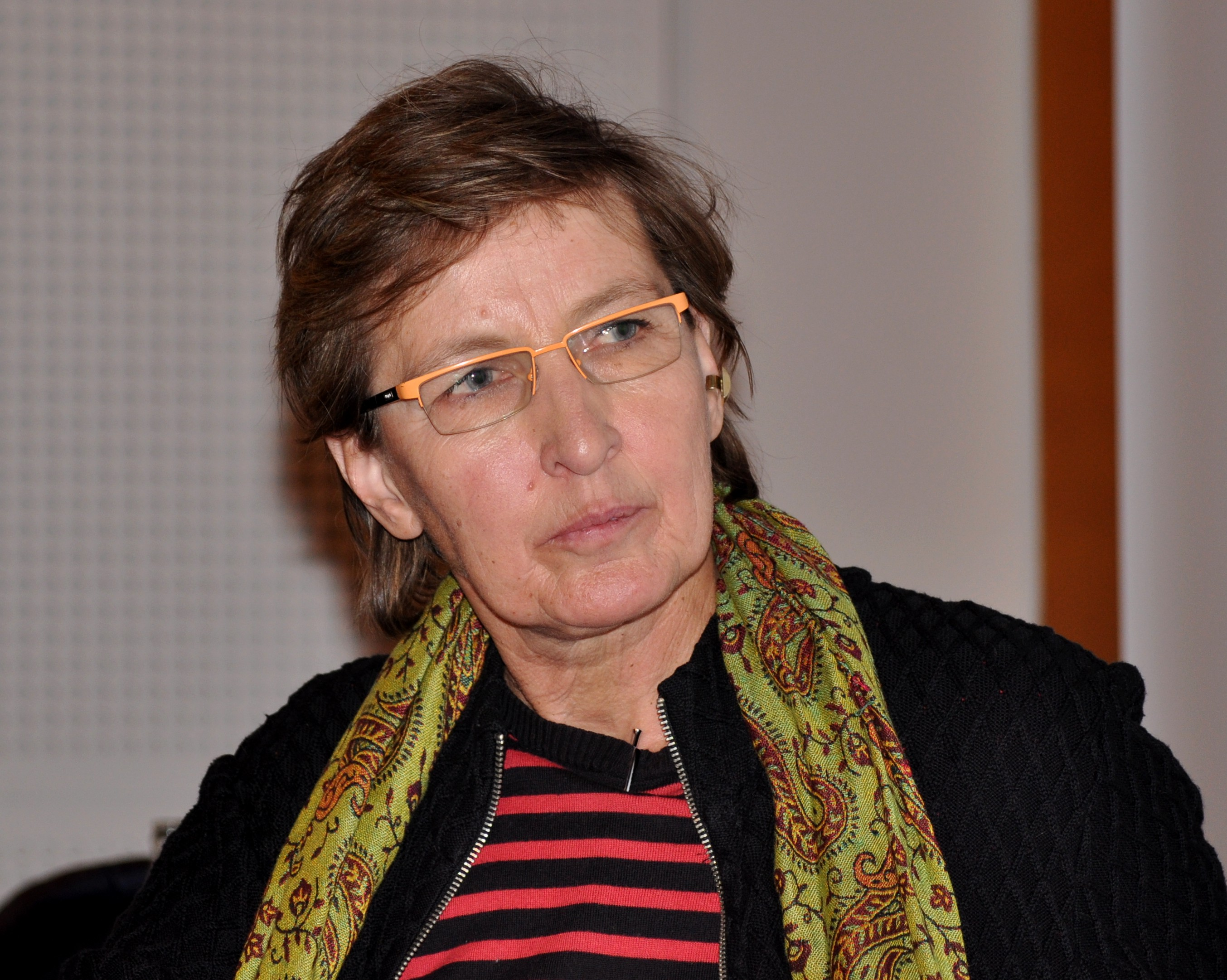
- Born: Pirjo Irene Honkasalo; 22 February 1947 (age 78); Helsinki, Finland
- Occupations: Film director, cinematographer, film editor, producer, screenwriter
- Years active: 1970–present
- Spouse: Pirkko Saisio

Pirjo Irene Honkasalo (born 22 February 1947) is a Finnish film director who has also worked as a cinematographer, film editor, producer, screenwriter and actress. In 1980 she co-directed Flame Top with Pekka Lehto, with whom she worked earlier and later as well. The film was chosen for the 1981 Cannes Film Festival. In the 1990s she focused on feature documentaries such as "The Trilogy of the Sacred and the Satanic" (Mysterion, Tanjuska and the 7 Devils and Atman). Honkasalo returned to fiction with Fire-Eater (1998) and Concrete Night (2013), both of which were written by Pirkko Saisio. Concrete Night won six Jussi Awards in 2014, among them the Jussi for the Best Direction and the Jussi for the Best Film. Its world premiere was at the Toronto International Film Festival in Masters series.

Pirjo Honkasalo worked as provincial artist laureate in Central Finland 1974–1975. At that time she drove around the area with one-armed scholar who made research of traditional handcrafts. Honkasalo photographed all the interviewees voluntarily. On that journey she met the main characters of her documentary Their Age. She is the first honorary member of Women in Film & Television Finland. The organisation says that "Honkasalo has [...] made touching films of universal topics" and also spoken out about the gender inequality in film industry.

Pirjo Honkasalo and her partner Pirkko Saisio live in Kruununhaka, Helsinki, but they also have apartments in Tavastia, Turku and Madeira. Both of them enjoy travelling and they together have written a travel book Exit (1987). They've raised Saisio's daughter, actress Elsa Saisio, and are one of the best-known lesbian couples in Finland.

== Early life and education ==
Pirjo Honkasalo was born in Helsinki, but the family moved to Pori when she was one year old. Honkasalo studied film in School of Art and Design, Helsinki. She started there at the age of 17 and was only 21 years old when she graduated in 1969. The school had great connections to FAMU and Honkasalo was very active and interested in the international projects. In 1971–1972 Honkasalo studied and worked as an assistant in Temple University, Philadelphia. Studies included visual anthropology.

== Work ==
Honkasalo has worked with some other well-known Finnish filmmakers such as Rauni Mollberg and Jörn Donner, who have also helped her in her career. She was the first woman in Finland who did the cinematography for a feature film (Pilvilinna, 1970).

Her most recent film Concrete Night is shot in black and white. She claims that in black and white it's possible to make the environment and story more simple and clear. Honkasalo's films are known for their lack of talk. "Picture can reach the unspoken part of a human. The part indescribable with language". Honkasalo thinks that this silence makes the filming itself almost sacred.

Honkasalo doesn't want to separate fiction and documentary films, she rather thinks that both have elements from each category. She got used to working with the camera on her shoulder from the beginning, so she can move quickly and won't miss any good authentic moments. Often she does the directing and shooting at the same time, "cinematography is part of directing", as she says. It also means that she doesn't have to shoot as much; "In Tanjuska and the 7 Devils, I had 2,2 times the material compared to the final cut". Doing this helps the editing process which she also often does herself. Honkasalo insists on making the final cut of her films, which is why for an example the BBC won't buy her work.

== Selected filmography ==
- Pilvilinna (1970) (cinematography)
- The Earth Is a Sinful Song (1973) (with Rauni Mollberg)
- Their age (1976) (with Pekka Lehto)
- Two Forces (1979) (with Pekka Lehto)
- Flame Top (1980) (with Pekka Lehto)
- Nine Ways to Approach Helsinki (1982) (with Pekka Lehto and Jörn Donner)
- 250 Grammes – a Radioactive Testament (1983) (with Pekka Lehto)
- Da Capo (1985) (with Pekka Lehto)
- Mysterion (1991) (with Eira Mollberg)
- Tanjuska and the 7 Devils (1993)
- The Cinderella of Tallinn (1996) (with Marja Pensala)
- Atman (1997)
- Fire-Eater (1998)
- The 3 Rooms of Melancholia (2004)
- Ito – a Diary of an Urban Priest (2010)
- Concrete Night (2013)
- Orenda (film) (2025), It competed in the Big Screen Competition section of the 54th International Film Festival Rotterdam to be screened in February 2025.

== Awards ==
Many of Honkasalo's films have been nominated in several international film festivals. She has received four life-work awards: BAT Prize at Sodankylä 1993, Suomi-Finland Award 1998, Laterna Magica for director 1999 and Aho & Soldan award at the DocPoint Helsinki Documentary Film Festival 2004. Flame Top was nominated in Cannes Film Festival's main competition 1981 and won four Jussi Awards in the same year, among them an award for the best direction. Their previous co-direction Two Forces won the Jussi for the Best Team in 1980.

Tanjuska and the 7 Devils (1993)

- International Jury Award, Bombay International Film Festival 1994
- Amanda award for the best documentary, Norwegian International Film Festival 1993
- Kettu prize (Best Finnish documentary film) 1993
- State of Finland Film Award, 1993
- Special Jussi Award, 1994

Atman (1997)

- Joris Ivens Award, International Documentary Film Festival Amsterdam 1996
- Kettu prize (Best Finnish documentary film) 1996
- State of Finland Film Award 1996

Fire-Eater (1998)

- Grand Prix of American Film Institute, Los Angeles Film Festival 1998
- Youth Jury Award, Locarno Film Festival 1998
- State of Finland Film Award 1998
- Don Quixote Award – Young cinema, Locarno Film Festival 1998
- Rouen Audience Award, Rouen Nordic Film Festival 1999

The 3 Rooms of Melancholia (2004)

- First Prize, CPH:DOX 2004
- Lina Mangiacaple Award, Venice Film Festival 2004
- Human Rights Award, Venice Film Festival 2004
- Amnesty International Doen Award, International Documentary Film Festival Amsterdam 2004
- Seeds of War Award, Full Frame Documentary Film Festival 2005
- Special Mention, Best International Film, DocAviv 2005
- Fipresci Award, Thessaloniki International Film Festival 2005
- Most Innovative Filmmaker Award, Chicago International Film Festival 2005
- Grand Price, Zagreb Film Festival 2005
- Signis – World Catholic Association for Communication Award, Mar del Plata Film Festival 2005
- Best Director Award, One World Film Festival 2005 (together with Ditsi Carolino's film Bunso)

Concrete Night (2013)

- Grand Prix, Warsaw International Film Festival 2013 (Nominated)
- Jussi for the Best Direction 2014
- Jussi for the Best Film 2014
- Dragon Award, Göteborg Film Festival 2014 (Nominated)
