= List of Finnish television series =

Television in Finland is one of the main media outlets in Finland. The following is a list of television series produced in Finland and their date of first airing.

== - ==
- 10 Finnish Architects: An Outsider's View (2003) (mini)
- 112 auttajat (1999)
- 30-luvun mies (1969)
- 4Pop (2003)
- 50 pientä minuuttia (1967)
- 6pack (2008)
- 66th North Precinct (2023)
- À la Laila (1967) (mini)
- Ähläm sähläm (2006)
- Äijät (2007)
- Äitien sota (2015)
- Äkkiä Anttolassa (1999)
- Ällitälli (1971)
- ÄWPK - Älywapaa palokunta (1984)
- Île, L' (1987) (mini)
- Ögonaböj (2005)

== A ==
- Aaken ja Sakun kesäkeittiö (1999)
- Aamu-TV (1997)
- Aarresaaren sankarit (2003) (mini)
- Aasi, Morso ja Mouru (1999)
- Aatami & Beetami (1997)
- Act!one (2004)
- Ajankohtainen kakkonen (1969)
- Ajoneuvos (2006)
- Akkaa päälle (1994)
- Akkulaturit (1995)
- Alhola (1991)
- Angry Birds Blues (2017)
- Angry Birds Stella (2014)
- Angry Birds: Summer Madness (2022)
- Angry Birds Mystery Island (2024)
- Angry Birds Toons (2013)
- Alivaltiosihteeri muistelee (1993) (mini)
- Alivaltiosihteeri valvoo (1994) (mini)
- Alppikengistä jäljet vain jää (1973)
- Alright? Alright! (2005)
- Ammuntaa - Ulla Tapaninen (1996)
- Amorin kaaret (1998)
- Angela ja ajan tuulet (1999)
- Annan ja Vasilin rakkaus (1988)
- Ansa ja Oiva (1998)
- Anteeksi kuinka? (1993)
- Antiikkia, antiikkia (1997)
- Antiikkieno (2007)
- Arman reilaa (2004)
- Arto Nyberg (2004)
- Arvo Ylppö 100 vuotta (1987)
- Arvokkaasti (2000)
- Assari (2005)
- Ateenasta Los Angelesiin (1984)
- Autopalatsi (1994)
- Autre Iran, L' (2003)
- Avec Sara (2005)

== B ==
- Baari (2006)
- Barr-niminen mies (1984)
- Basaari (1996)
- Bella (2006)
- Ben Furman (1998)
- Benner & Benner (2001)
- Best & Bester (2022)
- Bettina S. (2002)
- Big Bang (1998)
- Big Brother Suomi (2005)
- Blondi tuli taloon - Sattui kerran kesällä (1997)
- Blondi tuli taloon (1994)
- Bongari (1994)
- Bonus (2002)
- BumtsiBum! (1997)

== C ==
- Café Kirpputori (1996)
- Camping Satumaa (1998)
- Chansen (1990)
- Cosmomind (2003)

== D ==
- Day the Universe Changed, The (1985)
- Diili (2005)
- Diili+ Johtoryhmä (2005)
- Din vredes dag (1991)
- Dirlandaa (2000) (mini)
- Doing! (1985)
- Donna Paukku (2007)
- Double Trouble (1998)
- Duudsoni-elämää (2004)

== E ==
- Edessä lupaava tulevaisuus (1991)
- Ei itketä lauantaina (1993)
- Ei kannata hellittää (2003)
- Einstein (2006)
- Elina, mitä mä teen? (1999) (mini)
- Elixir Sport (2002)
- Ellen Express (2005)
- Eläinopissa (2003)
- Elämä on näytelmä (1999) (mini)
- Elämänmeno (1978)
- Enkeleitä ja pikkupiruja (1998)
- Enkelten keittiö (1989)
- Enkelten siipi (1993) (mini)
- Epilaattori (2004)
- Escort (TV show) (2003)
- Esiripun takaa (1995) (mini)
- Estonia (2023)
- Euroviisut (2004) (mini)
- Eurovision laulukilpailu, Suomen karsinta (2005) (mini)
- Evvk (2004)
- Extreme duudsonit (2001)

== F ==
- Fabio & Fabrizio (2006)
- Fakta homma (1986)
- Falkenswärds möbler (2000)
- Fallesmannin Arvo ja minä (1995) (mini)
- Far Out (2001/II)
- Fasaanit (1990)
- FC Nörtit (2006)
- Firklang (1965)
- Firma (2005)
- Fling (2004)
- Frank Pappa Show (1991)
- Fyra sånger från Finland (2004)

== G ==
- G5 - Gimme Five! (2004)
- Get Up, Stand Up (2005)
- Gigglebug (2013)
- Giljotiini (2001)
- Gladiaattorit (1993)
- Gold Rush, The (2000) (mini)
- Greed (2000)
- Groovymeisseli (1997)
- Gränsfall (2007) (mini)

== H ==
- Haastattelijana Mirja Pyykkö (1993)
- Halleluja (1998) (mini)
- Haluatko filmitähdeksi? (2003)
- Haluatko miljonääriksi? (1999)
- Hamsterit (1982) (mini)
- Handu pumpulla (2005)
- Hannu ja Kettu (1992)
- Hanski (1966)
- Harakanpesä (2003)
- Hardwick (1988)
- Harjunpää ja heimolaiset (1995)
- Harjunpää och antastaren (1985)
- Harjunpää och kalla döden (1983)
- Harvoin tarjolla (2008)
- Hauskat kotivideot (2005)
- Hautalehto (2021)
- Havukka-ahon ajattelija (1971)
- Headhunters (2004)
- Hecumania (1996)
- Hei hulinaa (1988)
- Heikki ja Kaija (1961)
- Heikoin lenkki (2002)
- Heksa ja Leksa (1989)
- Hellapoliisit (1989)
- Hello Hello Hello (1975)
- Helsinki 1952: Games of the XV Olympiad (1952) (mini)
- Helsinki 450 - tietokilpailu (2000)
- Hep (1983)
- Hepskukkuu (1979)
- Herkku & Partanen (1995)
- Herra 47 (1994)
- Herra Kenonen (1969)
- Herrat nauraa (1999)
- Hiljaista on (2003)
- Hilma (1969)
- Hirveä juttu (1993)
- Historiske arbejdspladser (2003)
- Hittimittari (1984)
- Hobitit (1993) (mini)
- Hohto (2004)
- Hohtohetki (1997)
- Hoi maamme suomi (1981)
- Hotelli Sointu (2000)
- Hovimäen aikaan (1999)
- Hovimäki (1999)
- Huh hellettä! (1986)
- Hui helinää (1989)
- Huijarinainen (1995) (mini)
- Hukkaputki (1981)
- Hullu Suomi (1992)
- Hulukkoset (1974)
- Huojuva talo (1990) (mini)
- Huomenna on paremmin (1992)
- Hupiklubi (2002)
- Hurja joukko (1998)
- Hurja joukko (2002) (mini)
- Hurrit (2002)
- Huuliveikot (1998)
- Huuma (2005)
- Huvin vuoksi (1996)
- Hydronauts, The (2006)
- Hylättyjen klubi (1993)
- Hymyhuulet (1987)
- Hynttyyt yhteen (1991)
- Hyppönen Enbuske Experience (2002)
- Hyvien ihmisten kylä (1993)
- Hyvä veli (1995)
- Hyvät herrat (1990)
- Hyvät naiset ja herrat (1986)
- Hyvät, pahat ja rumat (1992)
- Hyvät, Rumat & Rillumarei (1983)
- Häkkilinnut (1991)
- Hämmentäjien kuningas (2002)
- Häräntappoase (1989)
- Hömppäveikot (1996)

== I ==
- Idan jengi (1993)
- Idols (2003/II)
- Ihana mies (1999) (mini)
- Ihme juttu (1990) (mini)
- Ihmeidentekijät (1996)
- Ihmisen käsikirja (2000)
- Ihmisen paras ystävä (1990)
- Ikimuistoinen (2004)
- Ilettääkö (1988)
- Ilkamat (1970)
- Illan Kajo: Herrain metkuja (1999)
- Illan päätteeksi, Timo T.A. Mikkonen (1993)
- Illuusio (2006)
- Ilman kavaluutta (1996) (mini)
- Ilona Rauhala -keskusteluohjelma (2007)
- Ilonen talo (2006) (mini)
- Ilotalo (1988)
- Iltalypsy (1993)
- Insider (1999) (mini)
- Iris Klewe (1981)
- Irtiottoja (2003)
- Isabella (2006) (mini)
- Iskelmäprinssi (1998)
- Isku suoneen (1988)
- Isänmaan kaikuja (1991)
- Isänmaan toivot (1998)
- Itse valtiaat (2001)
- Itämeren helmet (2004) (mini)

== J ==
- J.K. Paasikivi (1988)
- Jaajon jacuzzi (2003)
- Jako Kahteen (2006)
- Jatkoaika (1967)
- Jauhon kauppa (2002)
- Jazzia Viiskulmassa (2003)
- Jenseits der Morgenröte (1985) (mini)
- Jeopardy! (2007)
- JES! (1995)
- JET - Jaa ei tyhjiä (1984)
- Joka kodin asuntomarkkinat (1991)
- Jokainen vieras on laulun arvoinen (2007)
- Jokamiehen kymppitonni (1991)
- Joonas Hytönen show (1999)
- Joonas (2006)
- Jopet-show (2005)
- Jos sais kerran (2002)
- Jos (2004)
- Joulukalenteri (1963-2002)
- Jukka Puotilat Show (1998)
- Julmahuvi esittää: Mennen tullen (2000) (mini)
- Jumalan kaikki oikut (2006) (mini)
- Junnutonni (1991)
- Jurismia! (2002)
- Juu ei (2002)
- Juulian totuudet (2002) (mini)
- Jyrki Countdown (1996)
- Jyrki (1995)
- JÅ-NE-TV (2007)
- Jäitä hattuun (1994)
- Jäähyväiset lasihevoselle (1985)
- Jäähyväiset rakkaimmalle (1993) (mini)
- Jörn Donnerin kuusi elämää (2003)

== K ==
- K-70 (2008)
- K. Tervo (1995)
- Kaatis (1988)
- Kadonnut näky (1997) (mini)
- Kahdeksan surmanluotia (1972) (mini)
- Kahden vaiheilla (1994)
- Kaikilla mausteilla (1996)
- Kaikki kotona (2000)
- Kaikki kunnossa (2007)
- Kaikkien valehtelijoiden äiti (1993)
- Kaken pesula (1997)
- Kalapuikkokeitto (1998)
- Kansakunnan käännekohta (2006)
- Kansalaiset (mini)
- Kansallistietäjä (2008)
- Kansanhuvit (1992)
- Kansankynttilät (2003)
- Karjalan kunnailla (2007)
- Katapultti (1971)
- Katso naamion taa (1989) (mini)
- Katso pois (2002)
- Kaunis mies (2003) (mini)
- Kaupungin kaunein lyyli (1990)
- Kaverille ei jätetä (1999)
- Kaverukset (1961)
- Keltaisen kirahvin eläintarinat (2003) (mini)
- Kertun pariasiaa (1999)
- Kesäillan valssi (1996)
- Kesäkerttu (1998)
- Kesäparatiisi (2002)
- Ketjureaktio (2002)
- Ketonen & Myllyrinne (2006)
- Kettunen (televisio-ohjelma) (1988)
- Kiimaiset poliisit (1993)
- Kiinnisidottu (1994) (mini)
- Kiitos ja hyvästi (1992)
- Kippariklubi (1960)
- Kirjava silta (2000)
- Kirje isältä (2003) (mini)
- Kirvesmiehet (2001)
- Kissa vieköön (1987)
- Kiurunkulma (1966)
- Kivatsulle.tv (2003)
- Kivi ja kilpi (2001)
- Kivisydän (1984)
- Klaustrofobia (1982)
- Klubi (1998)
- Kodin kääntöpiiri (2001)
- Kohtaamiset ja erot (1994)
- Koiramäki (2004) (mini)
- Koivula ja tähdet (2000)
- Kokkisota (1999)
- Kolarikorjaamossa kummittelee (1987)
- Kolmannen korvapuusti (1993)
- Komeaa sukua (1990)
- Komikfabrik (2006)
- Kommissarie Winter (2001)
- Konstan koukkuja (1998)
- Konstan pylkkerö (1994)
- Kontrapunkt (1971)
- Korkeajännitystä - eli sähköä kotiinkuljetettuna (2001)
- Korvatunturin tallin joulu (1999)
- Kosketuksessa (2007)
- Koskinen (2021)
- Kotikatu (1995)
- Kotirappu (1987)
- Kova laji (2003)
- Kovaa maata (1994)
- Krisse Road Show (2007)
- Krisse (2003)
- Krøniken (2004)
- Kuka uskoo haikaraa? (1984) (mini)
- Kuka, mitä, häh? (2007)
- Kukkivat roudan maat (1981) (mini)
- Kulkija Kuosmanen ja kappale kauneinta Suomea (1998)
- Kulkuri ja kaunottaret (1999)
- Kultainen noutaja (2007) (mini)
- Kultainen salama (1994)
- Kultajukka & kumppanit (2000)
- Kultajukka (1998)
- Kultakuume.com (2001) (mini)
- Kumman kaa (2003)
- Kummeli (1991)
- Kunnon sotamies Svejkin seikkailuja (1968)
- Kurvi (1980)
- Kuten haluatte (1966)
- Kuudesti laukeava (1992)
- Kuumia aaltoja (2003)
- Kuusikko ja kuoleman varjot (1997)
- Kuutamolla (2001)
- Kvartetti (1991) (mini)
- Kyky 80 (1980)
- Kyllä isä osaa (1994)
- Kylmän kosketus (1999) (mini)
- Kylmäverisesti sinun (2000)
- Kylä (1980)
- Kymmenen uutiset (1981)
- Kymppitonni (1985)
- Käenpesä (2004)
- Kätevä emäntä (2004)
- Käytöskukka (1966)
- Köyhät pojat (1991) (mini)

== L ==
- Labyrintti (1994)
- Lapinlahden Linnut show (1993)
- Lapsuuteni (1967) (mini)
- Lasse Pöysti show (1959)
- Lauantaitanssit
- Laura kaupungissa (2005)
- Laura Wou! (1999)
- Laura (2002) (mini)
- Legend to Ride, A (1997)
- Lehmän vuosi (2006)
- Leijonan kita (2007)
- Leikin varjolla (2002)
- Lemmenleikit (2008)
- Lemmikit esittää (2007) (mini)
- Lemmikit (2006)
- Lentsu (1990) (mini)
- Levyraati (1960)
- Liemessä (2004)
- Lighthouse (1968) (mini)
- Lihaksia ja luoteja (1996)
- Liljankukka (1997)
- Linnunradan pianobaari (1998)
- Loistavat Jerkun pojat (1999)
- Loman tarpeessa (2005)
- Lottovoittajien maa (1990)
- Love Boat: The Next Dame, The (2000)
- Lukio (2008)
- Luonnollinen kuolema (1992) (mini)
- Luonnonmukainen rakastaja (1992)
- Lyhyitä erikoisia (1985)
- Lyyli ja aikamiespoikansa Anselmi (1969)
- Lähempänä taivasta (1996)
- Lämminveriset (1996)
- Läpiveto (2006)
- Lääkärit tulessa (1998)

== M ==
- M-show (1971)
- Maailman kahdeksan ihmettä (1990)
- Maailman ympäri (2000)
- Maailmassa on virhe (1998)
- Maajussille morsian (2006)
- Maan mainiot (2002)
- Maan mitta (2007) (mini)
- Madventures (2002)
- Mahabharata, The (1989) (mini)
- Mahdottoman tavallinen Jorma Laine (1995)
- Mahtihäät (2000) (mini)
- Majakka (2006)
- Makaroff & Modig (2003)
- Maleena (2008) (mini)
- Malesian matkaajat (2004)
- Mallikoulu 2005 (2005)
- Manitbois (1992)
- Mankeli (2000)
- Manne-tv (2007) (mini)
- Marcon kanssa kahden (2000)
- Maria, Maria (2007)
- Markus Kajon ihme pätkiä (2003)
- Mazarin (1978) (mini)
- McCoys Show, The (2003)
- Me kastelijat (1997)
- Me Stallarit (2004)
- Me Tammelat (1969)
- Me, Myself and I (2007)
- Mediapeli (1995)
- Megavisa (1991)
- Meidän jengi (2005)
- Merirosvoradio (1974)
- Metsolat (1993)
- Mikset sä soita (1994)
- Miljonääri-Jussi (2004)
- Milkshake (1994)
- Minun uskoni (2003)
- Minä ja Sarasvuo (1995)
- Mire Bala Kale Hin - tarinoita matkan takaa (2001)
- Missä olet Peter Aava? (2002) (mini)
- Missä vika? (2004)
- Mitä ihmettä? (2003)
- Mitäs sais olla (1998)
- Modern Men (2019)
- Mogadishu Avenue (2006)
- Mollen löytötavaraa (1990)
- Moomin (1990)
- Moominvalley (2019)
- Mooseksen perintö (2001)
- Moottori-ilta Pasilassa (1994)
- Mr. Finland 2003: sensuroimaton (2003)
- M/S Romantic (2019)
- Muisti palaa pohjaan (2004)
- Muistojeni Karjala (2004)
- Mummo (1987)
- Mummoni ja Mannerheim (1971)
- Munthe (1995) (mini)
- Muodollisesti pätevä (1999)
- Musta laatikko (1997)
- Musta sukka (2001) (mini)
- Musta tuntuu (1985)
- Mustajärven oudot linnut (1991)
- Mustan kissan kuja (2000)
- Mustapartainen mies (1990)
- Mutapainin ystävät (1984)
- My Secret Summer (1995)

== N ==
- Naapurilähiö (1969)
- Nahkiaiset (1998)
- Napakymppi (1985)
- Napaseutu (1994)
- Naurun paikka (1995)
- Neilin lähteet (1984)
- Nelosen uutiset (1998)
- Nettikymppitonni (2000)
- Nettimatkaaja Veikka Gustafsson (2002)
- Neurovisio (1992)
- Nevada (2006)
- Niilin lähteillä (1984)
- Nitrokabinetti (1997)
- Nitroliiga (1993)
- NO TV (1990)
- Nollatoleranssi (2004) (mini)
- Noppapotti (1995)
- Noriko Show (2004)
- Nortia (1996)
- Not Born to Rock (2007)
- Nousevan auringon Kajo (2006)
- Noutajat.net (2000)
- NU er det NU (2000)
- Nuijasota - 1500-luvun tarinoita (1993) (mini)
- Nyhjää tyhjästä (1991)
- Näytönpaikka (1995)

== O ==
- Oi kallis kaupunki (1975)
- Ollaan kuin kotonanne (1981)
- Omat jutut (1977)
- Onnelliset (2005)
- Onnenpyörä (1993)
- Onnenruudut (1998)
- Operaatio Interheil (2001) (mini)
- Operation Stella Polaris (2003) (mini)
- Osakkeet nousussa, Osku (1990)
- Osasto 5 (2005)
- Ota ja omista (1997)
- Ota mut kyytiin (2000) (mini)
- Ottaako sydämestä? (1995)
- Ou Nou! (2001)
- Outolintu (2004)
- Overdose (2002)

== P ==
- PORTKIDS: Petualangan besar dari abdias perahu (2004)
- Paavo ja Raili (2004)
- Paholaisen tytär (2002) (mini)
- Painajainen (1988) (mini)
- Pakanamaan kartta (1991) (mini)
- Pakkoruotsia på svenska teatern (2002)
- Palikkatesti (1991)
- Paljon pelissä (2004)
- Paluu naapurilähiöön (1997)
- Paluu Timbuktuun (1996)
- Palvelijat (2003)
- Pappa rakas (1993)
- Pappia kyydissä (1998)
- Parempi myöhään (1979)
- Parhaat vuodet (2000)
- Pari sanaa lemmestä (1992)
- Pariskooppi (2004)
- Paristo (2002)
- Pasila (2007)
- Passi ja hammasharja (1996)
- Pekko aikamiespoika (1993)
- Pelastajat (1998)
- Pelastajat (2007)
- Pelastakaa sotamies Hytönen (2004)
- Pelimies Vesku (1994)
- Pelkkää lihaa (2007) (mini)
- Pelkovaara (2004)
- Peltiheikit (1995)
- Perjantai-illan unelma (2005)
- Perkele - lisää kuvia Suomesta (1999) (mini)
- Persona non grata (2003)
- Pertsa ja Kilu (1975) (mini)
- Pertsa ja Kilu (2000)
- Peräkamaripojat (2001)
- Petelius ja Ruonansuu show (2001)
- Pictionary (1998)
- Pidetään yhtä (2002)
- Pieni ihmissydän (1989)
- Pieni pala Jumalaa (1999) (mini)
- Pieni rakkaustarina (2004) (mini)
- Piepposkan parempi arki (1998)
- Pietarin myytti (2003) (mini)
- Piggy Tales (2014)
- Piikkis (1987)
- Pikku kakkonen (1977)
- Pimeä puoli (2005)
- Pimeän hehku (1996)
- Pirjo, Pirjo ja Mato (2005)
- Pirunnyrkki (1990)
- Plåstrets pirat-tv (1994) (mini)
- Poikkeustila (2007)
- Pokerimestari 2006 (2006)
- Pokeritähti 2007 (2007)
- Poliisi-tv (1989)
- Poliisijuttu (1988)
- Pop-komissio (2001)
- Poppia kyydissä (2004)
- Popstars (2002/II)
- Presidentin kanslia (2008)
- Presidentin mies (1998) (mini)
- Presidentit (2005)
- Presidenttipeli (2000)
- Pressiklubi (2005)
- Pudonneita (1994)
- Puhtaat valkeat lakanat (1993)
- Pulkkinen (1999)
- Pulttibois (1989)
- Punahilkka (2007) (mini)
- Putkinotko (1998) (mini)
- Puukoi (1994)
- Puutarhaunelmia (2005)
- Pysäyttäkää Nyqvist (2022)
- Päin perhettä (1992)
- Päivän Lööppi (1997)
- Päivärinta (2000)
- Pääluottamusmies (1970)
- Pääroolissa (2005)
- På vårt vis (2006)

== R ==
- R-Studio (2002)
- Raid (2000)
- Rajametsän tarinoita (2004)
- Rakastuin mä luuseriin (2005)
- Rakkaat sisaret (1989)
- Rakkauden jano (1995)
- Rakkauden nälkä (2007) (mini)
- Rakkauden tanssi (1998) (mini)
- Randström & Co (2001)
- Ranuan kummit (2003)
- Ratikka-Raimo (1999)
- Rauta-aika (1982) (mini)
- Red Caps (2011)
- Reinikainen (1982)
- Reitti 44 (2005)
- Remontti (2003)
- Rieku ja Raiku (1998) (mini)
- Rikas ja kunniallinen (1988)
- Rikas mies (2004) (mini)
- Rikos ja rangaistus (1994)
- Rikospoliisi ei laula (2006)
- Rikospoliisi Maria Kallio (2003)
- Rikostarinoita Suomesta (2001)
- Rillumarei ja reipastamenoa (1995)
- Ring-A-Ling (2003)
- Rintamäkeläiset (1972)
- Risto Räppääjä (2000) (mini)
- Ristorante (1994)
- Rivitaloelämää (1989)
- Robotti von Rosenbergin tutkimukset (1984)
- Rock Stop (1988)
- Ruben & Joonas (2004)
- Ruben (2006)
- Runoja & Roskia (2007)
- Ruonansuu & Petelius Co (1997)
- Ruusun aika (1990)
- Ruutulippu (1991)
- Räsypokka (2002)
- Rölli (1986)
- Röyhkeä diplomaatti (2007)

== S ==
- Saastamoisen poika (1989)
- Sairaskertomuksia (2004)
- Salapoliisi Tuukka Koljonen ja vaaralliset tehtävät (1989)
- Salatut elämät (1999)
- Salli mun nauraa (1993)
- Salonki (1996)
- Samaa sukua, eri maata (1998)
- Sami kokkaa (2004)
- Samppanjaa ja vaahtokarkkeja (1995)
- Sana mania (1999)
- Sartsan parantola (2006)
- Sata sanaa (2003)
- Sataman valot (1992)
- Satua ja totta (1997)
- Satumainen Onni (1987)
- Saunavuoro (2004)
- Schlager på lager (2002)
- Se on siinä (2001)
- Seitsemän kuolemansyntiä (1988)
- Seitsemän veljestä (1989) (mini)
- Seitsemän (2001)
- Seppo Hovin seurassa (1990)
- Septet (1966)
- Sergein totuus (1996) (mini)
- SF-studio (2004)
- SF-tarina (1991) (mini)
- Sikanautaa (2000) (mini)
- Sillä silmällä (2005)
- Sinbad (1968)
- Sininen laulu - Suomen taiteiden tarina (2003)
- Sinitaivas (1989) (mini)
- Sinäkö presidentiksi (2005) (mini)
- Sirkka ja Sakari (1975)
- Sirkus (2007)
- Sirkuspelle Hermanni (1978)
- Sisaret (2003)
- Sisarukset (1965)
- Sisko ja sen veli (1986)
- Siunattu hulluus (1975) (mini)
- Sivistyskansan tarina (2006) (mini)
- Skärgårdsdoktorn (1997)
- Snapphanar (2006) (mini)
- Sodan ja rauhan miehet (1978) (mini)
- Soitinmenot (1985)
- Soldater i månsken (2000) (mini)
- Solstenen (1986) (mini)
- Soppamies (2001)
- Sorainen (Harkimo) (2006)
- Sorjonen (2016)
- Spede show (1971)
- Spede special (1988)
- Speden parhaat (2003)
- Speden sallitut leikit (1990)
- Speden saluuna (1965)
- Speden spelit (1992)
- Speden tee-se-itse TV (1990)
- Spedevisio (1965)
- Spirello (2003)
- Stalingrad (2003)
- Stiller (1998)
- Stormskärs Maja (1975)
- Studio Impossible (2006)
- Studio Julmahuvi (1998)
- Sub Marine (2003)
- Sukka hukassa (1991)
- Sukujuhla (1998)
- Suloinen myrkynkeittäjä (1995) (mini)
- Sunnuntaikomitea (2003)
- SunRadio (1999)
- Suojelijat (2008)
- Suomalainen rakkaus (1980)
- Suomen parhaat (1994)
- Suomen Robinson (2004)
- Suomen tietoviisas (1990)
- Suomenlahden hylyt (1996)
- Suomi Pop (1985)
- Suomi-Filmin tarina (1993) (mini)
- Suoraa huutoa! (2004)
- Susi rajalla (2000)
- Susikoira Roi - Seikkailu saaristossa (1988)
- Susikoira Roi (1987)
- Suuri Kupla (2001)
- Suuri luokkakokous (2000)
- Suuri seikkailu (2001)
- Suurin pudottaja (2006)
- Sydän kierroksella (2006) (mini)
- Sydän toivoa täynnä (1997)
- Sydänjää (2007)
- Sydänten akatemia (1998)
- Syksyn sävel (1968)
- Syrhämä (2003)
- Sämpy (1974)
- Sänky (2002)

== T ==
- T.i.l.a (2001)
- Tabu (1986)
- Tahdon asia (2005)
- Taikapeili (1995)
- Taistelevat julkkikset (2004)
- Taiteilijaelämää (2005)
- Taivaan tulet (2007)
- Taivas sinivalkoinen (2001) (mini)
- Taivasalla (1994)
- Taivaskanavan tähdet (1999)
- Takaisin kotiin (1995)
- Talent (2007)
- Talo Italiassa (2005)
- Tammerkosken sillalla (1995)
- Tangomarkkinat (1985)
- Tankki täyteen (1978)
- Tanssii tähtien kanssa (2006)
- Tanssit stadissa (1994)
- Tapaus Ritva Valkama (1975)
- Tapulikylä (1992)
- Tarinatalo (1966)
- Tarkkis (1986)
- Tartu Mikkiin (2006)
- Tasavallan presidentti (2007) (mini)
- Tavallinen luokka (1993)
- Team Ahma (1998)
- Teijan keittiössä (1990)
- Telakka (2003)
- Tenavatähti (1990)
- Terveysasema (1989)
- Tervo & Päivärinta
- The Dibidogs (2010)
- The joulukalenteri (1997)
- The order - rahan jäljillä (2002) (mini)
- The Unstoppable Yellow Yeti (2022)
- Thilia thalia thallallaa (1982)
- Thilia Thalia (1985)
- Thilia Thalia (1998)
- Tie Eedeniin (2003)
- Tie tähtiin (2000)
- TIE (2003)
- Tietopörssi (1995)
- Tiina (1991)
- Tikkurila-trilogia (2006) (mini)
- Tohelon ja Torvelon joulukalenteri (1998)
- Toini ja Heikki Haaman Show (1995)
- Toista maata (2003)
- Toni Wirtanen Undercover (2004)
- Tonttu Toljanteri: Tonttu-TV (2003)
- Tonttu Toljanterin Joulukalenteri (1989)
- Top 40 (2003)
- Tosihemmot (1994)
- Trabant express (1998)
- Trasselirakastaja (1999) (mini)
- Tsa tsa tsaa (1993)
- Tuliportaat (1998)
- Tumma ja hehkuva veri (1997) (mini)
- Tummien vesien tulkit (2002)
- Tunteen palo (1999)
- Tuntematon kaupunki II (2002)
- Tuntematon kaupunki (2000)
- Tuntemattomalle jumalalle (1993) (mini)
- Tuomitut (1995) (mini)
- Tupla tai kuitti (1958)
- Turvetta ja timantteja (2006)
- Tutkimusmatkailijat (2005)
- Tuttavamme Tarkat (1961)
- Tuttu juttu (1992)
- TV-uutiset ja sää (1960)
- Tähtilampun alla (1997)
- Tähtitehdas (1998)
- Täysin työkykyinen (2003) (mini)
- Täyttä taikaa (1995)
- Tää ei jää tähän (2006) (mini)
- Tää on seksii! (2002) (mini)
- Täällä Tesvisio (2004)

== U ==
- Ugrilampaat (1999)
- Uimakoulu (1995)
- Umpimähkä (2003)
- Unelmakämppä (2004)
- Urpo & Turpo (1996)
- Uskomattomia tarinoita (1991)
- Uskottu mies (1985)
- Uudisraivaaja (2006)
- Uuno Turhapuro (1996)
- Uutisvuoto (1998)

== V ==
- V.I.P. seikkailu (2004)
- Vaarallinen risteys (2003)
- Vaarallista kokea (2003) (mini)
- Vaimonsa mies (2001)
- Vain muutaman huijarin tähden (1998)
- Vakavaa viihdettä (2002)
- Valehtelijoiden klubi (1981)
- Valehtelu virkistää (1990)
- Valhetta ja rakkautta (1997)
- Valiojoukko (2004)
- Vallan miehet (1986)
- Valmiina... Pyörii! (1967)
- Valomerkki (1991)
- Valotuksia (2004)
- Vapaa pudotus (2002)
- Varjo vain - savolainen eurodekkari (2003) (mini)
- Vasikantanssi (2003)
- Velipuolikuu (1983)
- Veljet (2008) (mini)
- Venny (2003) (mini)
- Verisiskot (1997)
- Vesku rempallaan (1992)
- Vesku show (1988)
- Vetää kaikista ovista (1978)
- Vi på lilla torget (1964)
- Videotreffit (1999)
- Viemäri-tv (1989)
- Vihreän kullan maa (1987)
- Viihdeohjelma Tukholma (1993)
- Viimeinen koukkaus (1990)
- Viimeiset siemenperunat (1993)
- Viiskulmasta itään (1993)
- Vill ni se på stjärnor? (1995)
- Vintiöt (1994)
- Vintti pimeenä (1999)
- Viuluviikarit musiikkimaassa (1979)
- Voimala (2003)
- Vuoroin vieraissa (1997)
- Vägg i vägg (1986)
- Vägsjälar (1998) (mini)

== W ==
- W-tyyli (2003)
- Wiisikko (1990)

== X ==
- X-paroni (1964)

== Y ==
- Yhdeksän miehen saappaat (1969) (mini)
- Yhteinen huone (2002)
- Yli rajojen - video vähemmistöjen äänenä (1988)
- Ylikävely (2008) (mini)
- Yokotai (2002)
