= Alivaltiosihteeri valvoo =

- Genre: Sketch comedy
- Written by: Alivaltiosihteeri
- Directed by: Matti Grönberg
- Starring: Simo Frangén; Pasi Heikura; Jyrki Liikka; Matti Toivonen
- Country of origin: Finland
- Original language: Finnish
- No. of seasons: 1
- No. of episodes: 6

Production
- Running time: Approx. 20 minutes
- Production company: YLE TV2 Viihdetoimitus

Original release
- Network: Yle TV2
- Release: 1994 – 1995

Alivaltiosihteeri valvoo (The Undersecretary of State oversees) is a 6-part Finnish television series by Yle. It aired on Finnish TV in 1994 and 1995. The series features the members of the band Alivaltiosihteeri, Simo Frangén, Pasi Heikura, Jyrki Liikka and Matti Toivonen.

The episodes all have distinct themes, with the cast taking roles such as the police, doctors, or amusement park employees. The main premise of the show has the cast commenting on sketches they watch from surveillance screens at work.

== Cast ==
- Simo Frangén
- Pasi Heikura
- Jyrki Liikka
- Matti Toivone

== See also ==
- List of Finnish television series
