= Bongir =

Bongir or Bon Gir (Persian: بن گير) may refer to:

- Bongir, Kohgiluyeh and Boyer-Ahmad
- Bon Gir, Sistan and Baluchestan
