= Rauno Ronkainen =

Finnish cinematographer (born 1964)

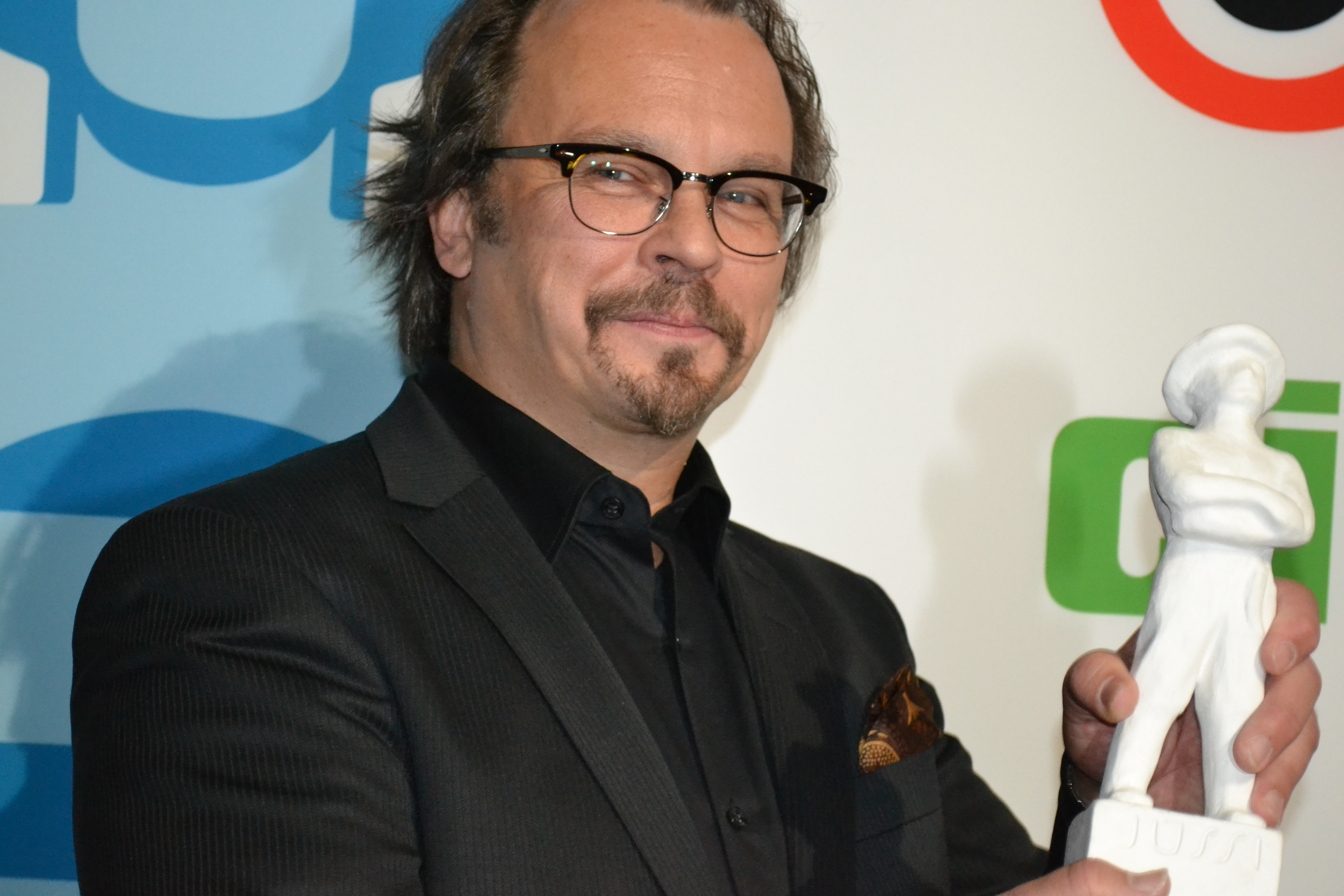
Rauno Ronkainen in 2013

Rauno Ronkainen (born 4 August 1964) is a Finnish TV and film cinematographer and cameraman.

He won the Kodak Nordic Vision Award at the 28th Gothenburg Film Festival in 2005 for his work on the acclaimed film Frozen Land.

== Partial filmography ==
- Shear Fear (1992)
- Lähtö (1995)
- Sepelimurskaamon kauniin Jolantan ihmeellinen elämä (1996)
- Peilikirkas päivä (1997)
- Ensi tiistaina Brahmsia (1998)
- Eloonjääneet (TV, 1998)
- Tähtäimessä NBA (TV, 1999)
- Kovat miehet (1999)
- Benner & Benner (6 episodes, 2001–2002)
- Juulian totuudet (miniseries, 2002)
- Irtiottoja (TV series, 2003)
- Me stallarit (1 episode, 2004)
- Frozen Land (2005)
- Uudisraivaaja (TV series, 2006)
- Frozen City (2006)
- Käenpesä (6 episodes, 2006)
- Järvi (2006)
- Rikospoliisi ei laula (1 episode, 2006)
- Kid Svensk (2007)
- Tears of April (2008) (as Rane Ronkainen)
- The House of Branching Love (2009)
- Stormskerry Maja (2024)
- Kalevala: The Story of Kullervo (2026)
