= Mäntylä =

Mäntylä is a Finnish surname. Notable people with the surname include:

- Hanna Mäntylä (born 1974), Finnish politician
- Jasmin Mäntylä (born 1982), Finnish model and singer
- Matti Mäntylä (born 1945), Finnish actor
- Tero Mäntylä (born 1991), Finnish footballer
- Tuukka Mäntylä (born 1981), Finnish ice hockey player
