= Karvalakki =

Fur cap worn in Finland and Russia

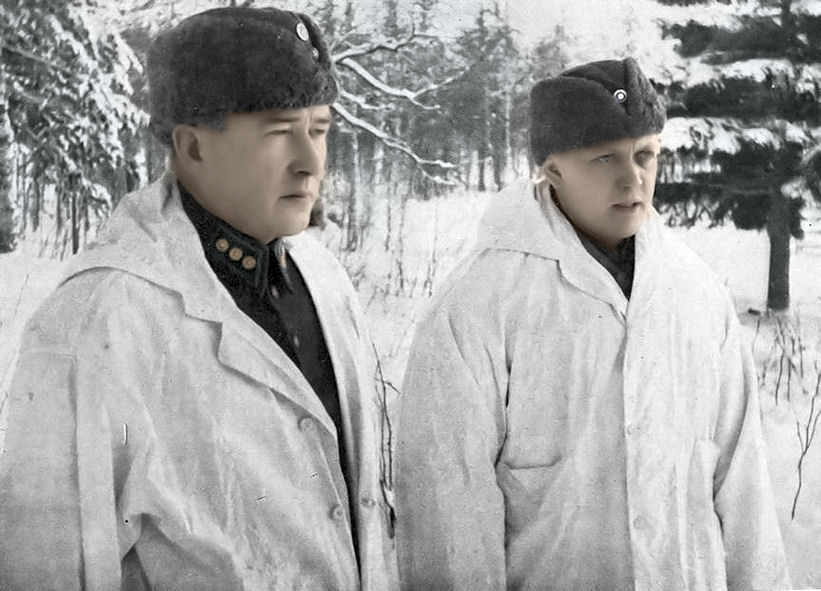

A karvalakki (Finnish: fur cap) is a cylinder-shaped, fur forage cap-styled hat typically worn in parts of Finland and Russia. Finnish TV presenter Hannu Karpo often wore a karvalakki on his show, Karpolla on asiaa.

In Finnish, the expression karvalakkimalli ("fur cap model") means a bare-bones, no-frills model, meaning the cheapest and most basic model that just works and does nothing extra. The term can also be used to describe anything that is very basic.

== See also ==
- Ushanka
- Papakhi
