= Itkonen =

Itkonen is a Finnish surname. Notable people with the surname include:

- Ensio Itkonen (1926–2010), Finnish driving instructor and traffic educator
- Esa Itkonen (born 1944), Finnish linguist
- Rieti Itkonen (1889–1951), Finnish lawyer, journalist, and politician
- T. I. Itkonen (1891–1968), Finnish historian and linguist
- Kale Itkonen (kmoe) (born 2004), Canadian musician
