= Jukka Laaksonen =

Finnish actor and comedian (born 1958)

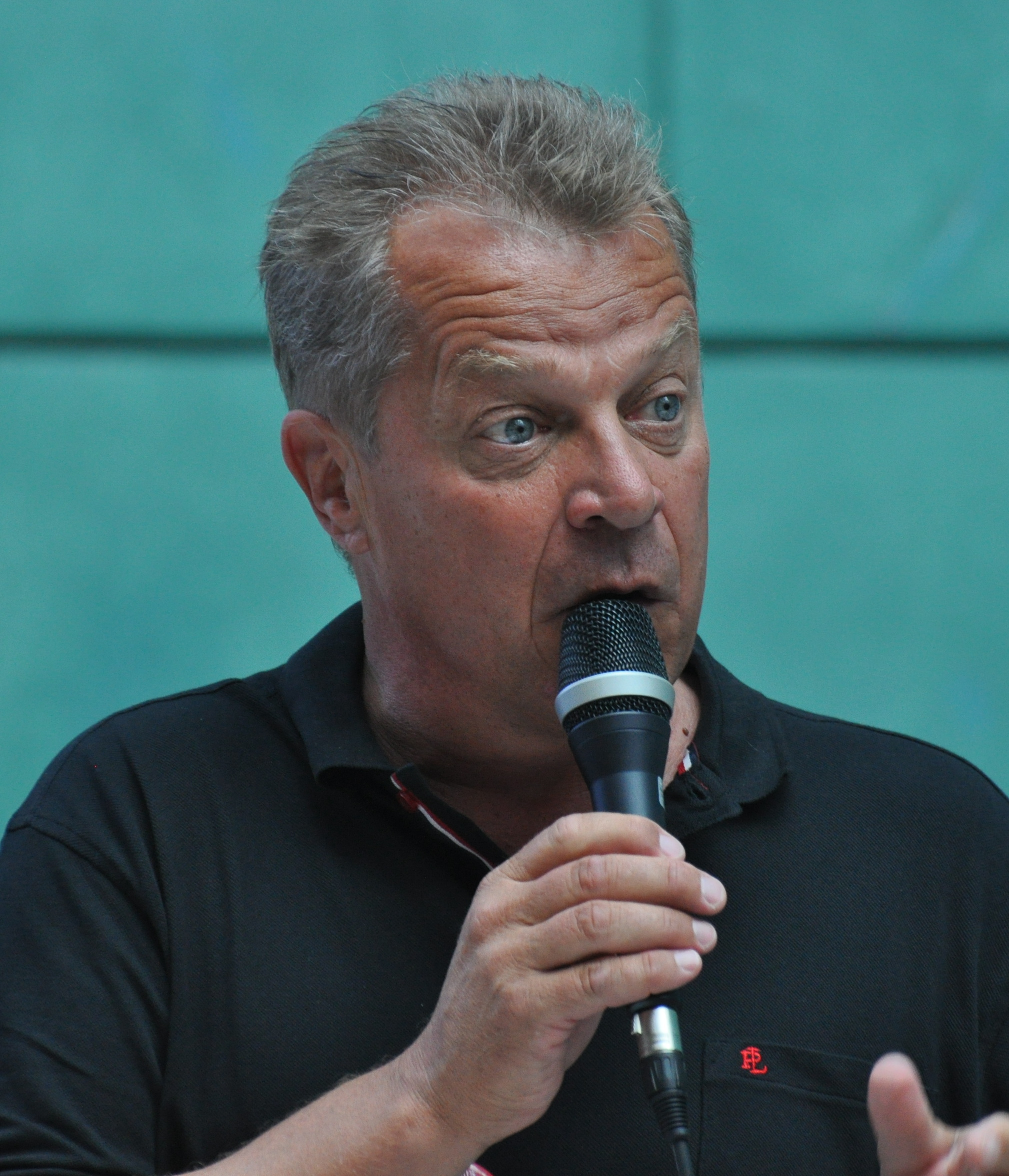
- Jukka Laaksonen in 2014
- Born: 15 July 1958 (age 67); Helsinki, Finland

Jukka Laaksonen (born 15 July 1958, in Helsinki) is a Finnish comedian, impressionist and compere. For most of the public he is familiar as one of the regular competitors in popular YLE TV2 sports quiz show Se on siinä. In the show he often shows his impressionist skills imitating many celebrities and also the way the Estonian people talk. In 1998 he made, together with Juha Laitila and Joonas Myllyveräjä, a comedy show Huuliveikot for TV channel Nelonen. In 1993 he acted in movie Uuno Turhapuron poika. Laaksonen is also a popular master of ceremonies and performer in different public or private staged events.
