= Äijät =

- Country of origin: Finland

Original release
- Network: Sub
- Release: 2007 – 2008

Äijät is a Finnish television series. It first aired on Finnish TV in 2007 and last aired in 2008.

== Soundtrack ==
=== CD ===
1. Children of Bodom: Are You Dead Yet?
2. Kalmah: Defeat
3. Collarbone: The Last Call
4. Eternal Tears of Sorrow: Sakura No Rei
5. Ensiferum: Deathbringer from the Sky
6. Naildown: Silent Fall
7. Noumena: Misanthropolis
8. Entwine: My Serenity
9. Kalmah: The Groan of Wind
10. Sólstafir: Ljósfari
11. Finntroll: Nedgång
12. Twilightning: Vice Jesus
13. Swallow the Sun: Hope
14. Amoral: Leave Your Dead Behind
15. myGRAIN: Pitch-Black
16. April: Stain
17. Ensiferum: Ad Victoriam

=== TV series tracks, not on album ===
- Kalmah: Man of the King
- Amoral: Apocalyptic Sci-Fi Fun
- Noumena: Fire and Water
- Nightwish: The Islander
- Nightwish: 7 Days to the Wolves
- Twilight Guardians: Out of Our Hands
- Machinae Supremacy: Edge and Pearl
- Machinae Supremacy: Dark City

== See also ==
- List of Finnish television series
