= Six pack =

Six pack, six-pack, or 6-pack may refer to:

== Collections of six objects of the same type ==
- Six-pack (muscles), visible rectus abdominis muscles ("abs")
- Six-pack, a type of beverage multi-pack including six containers
  - Specifically, a multi-pack joined by six-pack rings
- A photo array used by police officers to conduct a police lineup
- The arrangement of six basic flight instruments in an aircraft
- Sixpack (EU law), a set of European legislative measures

== Arts and entertainment ==
=== Film and television ===
- Six Pack (film), a 1982 comedy/drama film
- Six Pack (TV series), 1992 Australian TV anthology series
- Six-Pack, a 2000 thriller film
- Sixpack (film), a 2011 Finnish film
- 6pack, a 2008 Finnish TV series

=== Music ===
- Six Pack (band), a Serbian punk band
- Six Pack (EP) or the title song, by Black Flag, 1981
- Six Pack (Gary Burton album) or the title song, 1992
- Six Pack (The Police box set), 1980
- The Six Pack (ZZ Top box set), 1987
- 6-Pack (EP), by Florida Georgia Line in 2020
- "Six Pak", song by The Revels
- "6 Pack", a song by Dune Rats from The Kids Will Know It's Bullshit, 2017
- "Six Pack", a song by Tortoise from Standards, 2001
- Six-Pak, an extended play format created by Warner Bros. Records

=== Other ===
- Six Pack (comics), a team of fictional characters in the Marvel Comics universe
- The Six Pack, a former Sirius XM talk show and podcast
- Six-pack, a volleyball slang term for being hit directly in the face by a spiked ball

== Technology ==
- Novell "6 Pack", codename for Novell NetWare 6.0
- Dodge Six Pack, a term for three two-barrel carburetors used on Dodge Challengers and other vehicles in the 1960s and 1970s

== See also ==
- Joe Sixpack, proverbial name for an average person in the United States
- Operator of Uninspected Passenger Vessels License, colloquially called a 6-pack License
- Sixpack France, a French clothing brand
- Paramilitary punishment attacks in Northern Ireland, which include the "six pack"
