= Äkkiä Anttolassa =

Finnish television series

- Country of origin: Finland

Original release
- Network: Yle TV1
- Release: 1999 – 2000

Äkkiä Anttolassa is a Finnish television series. It first aired on Finnish TV in 1999 and last aired in 2000.

== Cast ==
- Eero Aho
- Kari Hietalahti
- Aake Kalliala

== See also ==
- List of Finnish television series
