= Anteeksi kuinka? =

Finnish late-night talk show

- Presented by: Lasse Lehtinen
- Country of origin: Finland
- No. of episodes: 84

Original release
- Network: MTV3
- Release: 1993 – 1996

Anteeksi kuinka? (English: Excuse me?) is a Finnish late-night talk show that was produced and first aired on Finnish TV in 1993 and last aired in 1996 on its original network MTV3 before being later telecasted from 1997 to 1999 on Nelonen. The program was hosted by Lasse Lehtinen, and Seppo Ahti and Ruben Stiller acted as "panelists" commenting on current affairs. In addition to Lehtinen, the program was scripted by Pekka Karhuvaara. The show had a total of 84 episodes.

It was the Finnish equivalent of NBC channel's The Tonight Show, hosted by the American Jay Leno.

A sketch program of the same name was shown in the late 1980s by Olli Kivistö and Jorma Hietamäki.

== See also ==
- List of Finnish television series
