= Zarkus Poussa =

Finnish musician (1975–2016)

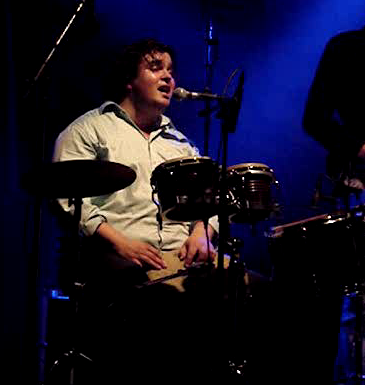
Poussa playing with Anna-Mari Kähärän Orkesteri in July 2007.

Jukka Markus "Zarkus" Poussa (12 July 1975 – 24 January 2016) was a Finnish musician. He was a member of the groups Giant Robot, RinneRadio, Hemma Beast and Anna-Mari Kähärän Orkesteri. He was known for using humor in his songs and performances. He was also the musician in the television show W-tyyli, and in 2007 he appeared in the series Jokainen vieras on laulun arvoinen. He died suddenly in January 2016, at the age of 40.
