= Antiikkia, antiikkia =

- Opening theme: Bye Bye Blues
- Country of origin: Finland

Original release
- Network: Yle TV1
- Release: 1997 – present

Antiikkia, antiikkia is a Finnish television series based on the format of the BBC Antiques Roadshow. It first aired on Finnish TV in 1997.

== See also ==
- List of Finnish television series
