= Frank Pappa Show =

- Country of origin: Finland

Original release
- Network: Kolmoskanava (1991-1992); MTV3 (1993-1994)
- Release: 1991 – 1994

Frank Pappa Show is a Finnish talk show. It first aired on Finnish TV in 1991 and last aired in 1994.

== See also ==
- List of Finnish television series
