= Rosa Meriläinen =

Finnish writer and politician (born 1975)

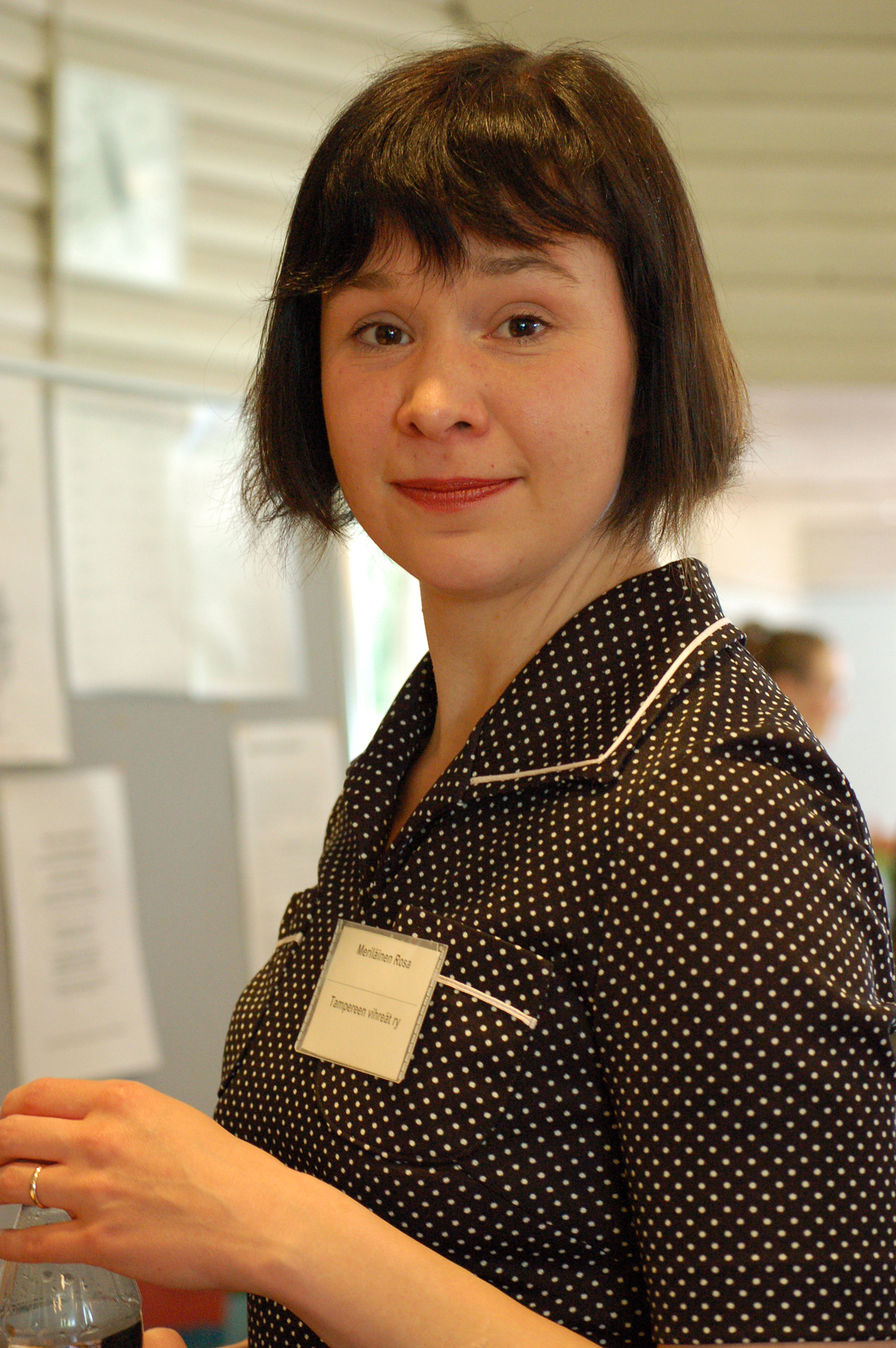

Member of Parliament
- In office 2003–2007

Personal details
- Born: 31 December 1975 (age 50) Tampere, Finland
- Party: Green League

Rosa Anneli Meriläinen (born 31 December 1975) is a Finnish politician from Tampere. Meriläinen has a master's degree in political science from the University of Tampere. She was elected to the parliament of Finland in 2003. She represents the Green League. Before that, she was the co-president of the green league and an assistant to Satu Hassi. Meriläinen is a candidate in the 2024 European Parliament elections.

In an interview by the Image-magazine Meriläinen confessed to have used cannabis as a representative during her career, and she confirmed the matter to MTV3 news. She was prosecuted for a drug offense, but was relieved of charges.

She reports of the political work on her blog. She is engaged to comedian Simo Frangén, with whom she has a son, Frans, born 2006.

The Finnish version of the pornographic magazine Hustler once printed a comic strip featuring a parody character of Meriläinen. Meriläinen sued the magazine, and the character's name was changed to be less recognisable.
