= 50 pientä minuuttia =

- Country of origin: Finland

Original release
- Network: Mainos-TV
- Release: 1967 – 1971

50 pientä minuuttia is a Finnish television series. It first aired on Finnish TV in 1967 and lasted aired in 1971 .

== Cast ==
- Spede Pasanen
- Simo Salminen
- Risto Aaltonen
- Pentti Siimes
- Marjatta Raita
- Vesa-Matti Loiri
- Heikki Kuvaja
- Pekka Laiho
- Raimo Virtanen

== See also ==
- List of Finnish television series
