= Ensio Itkonen =

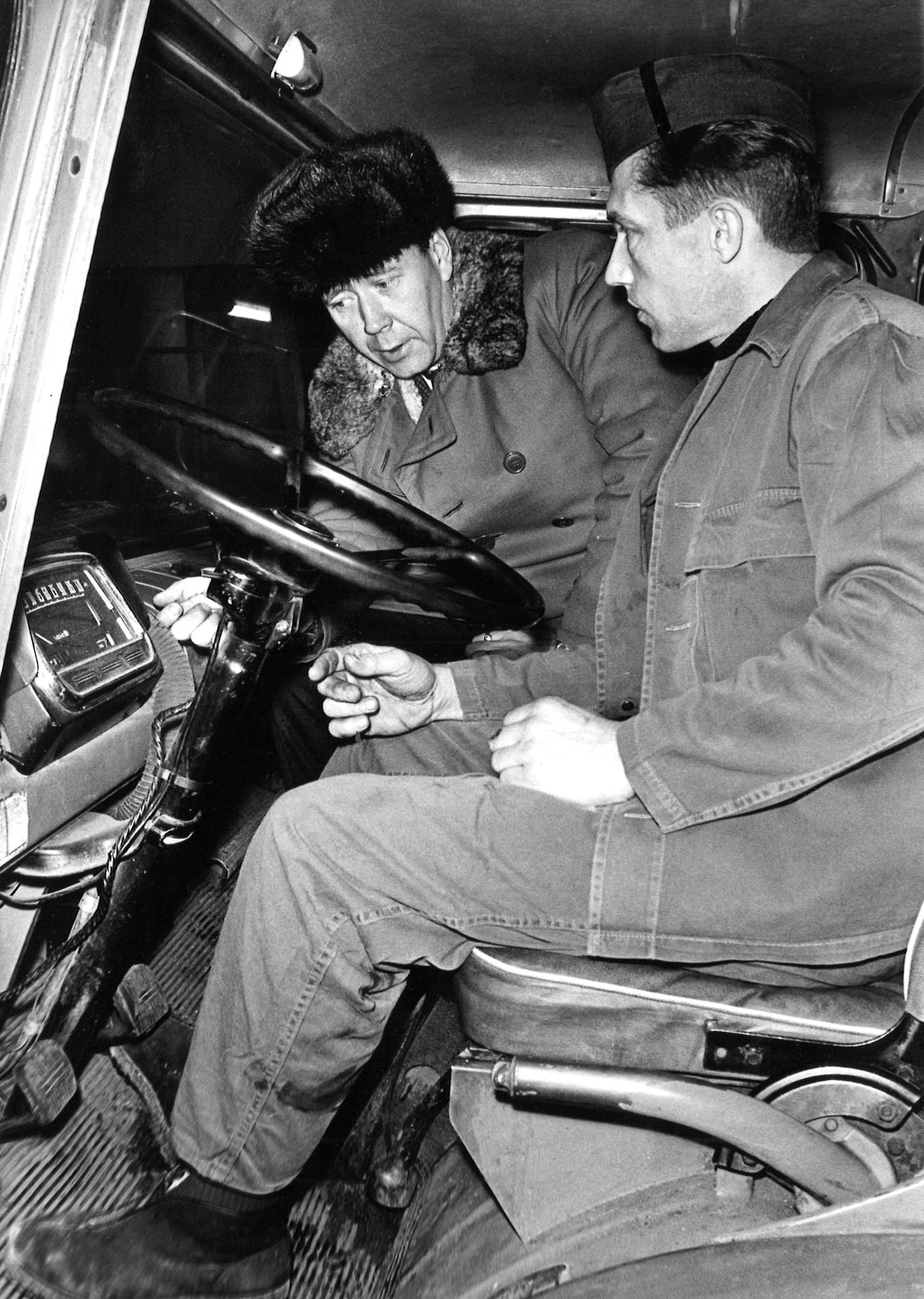
- Ensio Itkonen (center) in 1969
- Born: Onni Ensio Itkonen; 7 October 1926; Helsinki, Finland
- Died: 15 December 2010 (aged 84); Helsinki, Finland
- Other names: Enska
- Occupation: driving instructor
- Known for: traffic education

Onni Ensio "Enska" Itkonen (7 October 1926 – 15 December 2010) was a Finnish driving instructor and traffic educator. He had many public appearances, including speaking tours, public campaigns for improving drivers' safety (such as promotion of use of seat belts and headlights) and advice columns. Itkonen became a household name through his television appearances starting from the 1970s. He was a regular guest on Karpolla on asiaa (already in its first episode in 1983), a show hosted by Hannu Karpo who had worked with Itkonen already before the programme began.

itkonen's fame was such that he played a cameo as himself on Uuno Turhapuro armeijan leivissä, which remains the most viewed domestic film of all time in Finland according to official statistics.

== Bibliography ==
- Muista aina liikenteessä (Sanoma, 1975)
- Aja paremmin (Tammi, 1987)
