= Elämänmeno =

- Country of origin: Finland
- No. of seasons: 1
- No. of episodes: 3

Original release
- Network: Yle TV1
- Release: 1 November – 15 November 1978

Elämänmeno is a Finnish television series. It aired on Finnish television from 1 November 1978 to 15 November 1978. It was written by Pirkko Saisio, who wrote the novel of that same name that the show was based on, and directed by Åke Lindman. It starred Ritva Oksanen as Eila Nieminen and Erkki Pajala as Alpo Nieminen.

== See also ==
- List of Finnish television series
