= Juha Jokela =

Finnish playwright and scriptwriter

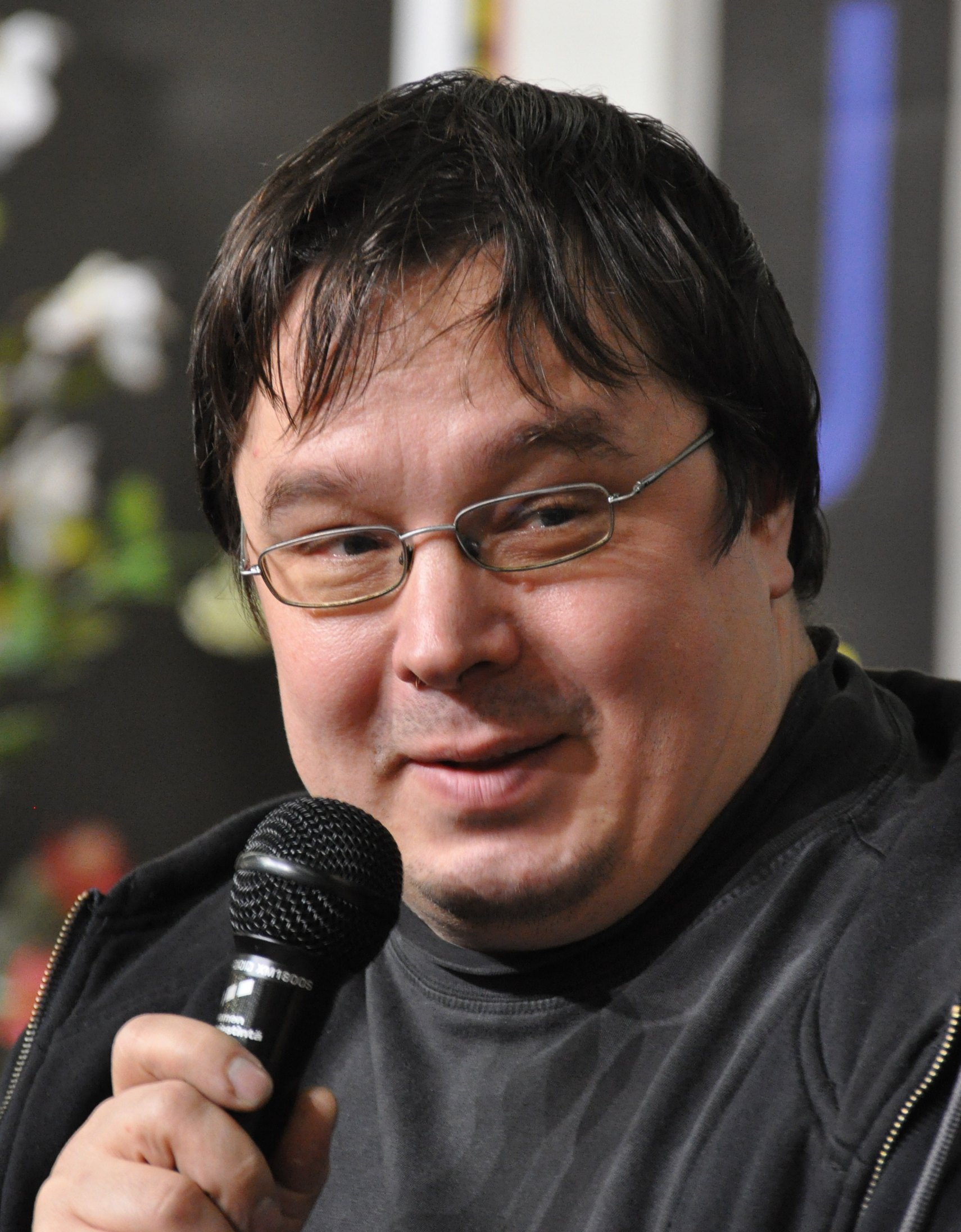
Juha Jokela in 2012.

Juha Petteri Jokela (born 7 January 1970 in Tampere) is a Finnish playwright and scriptwriter, best known for his Mobile Horror play and TV series.

Jokela graduated from high school gymnasium in Tampere in 1989 and studied the literature of science and theater studies at the University of Helsinki 1990–1994 and was a student of the Theatre Academy from 1994 onwards.

Jokela is married to actress Mari Lehtonen. He has written plays such as Fundamentalisti (2006), performed at the Jurkka Theatre.

== Filmography ==
As writer

- Nahkiaiset (1998) – TV series
- Ugrilampaat (1999) – TV series
- Pulkkinen (17 episodes, 1999) – TV series
- Don't Push the River (2000) – TV film
- Hupiklubi (2002) – TV series
- Remontti (2003) – TV series
- Me Stallarit (2004) – TV series
- Firma (11 episodes, 2005) – TV series
- Röyhkeä diplomaatti (2 episodes, 2007) – TV series
- Kallio (12 episodes, 2010) – TV series
- Mobile Horror (2010) – TV film
- Virta (8 episodes, 2010) – TV series
- Kimmo (3 episodes, 2012) – TV series
