= Fundamentalisti =

Fundamentalisti is a Finnish play. It was written by Juha Jokela and produced in 2006.

The play is a dialogue between two people with different attitudes towards religion, Heidi and Markus. Heidi represents the fundamentalist in the play. Markus is a more liberal priest who thinks that the Bible should be interpreted symbolically rather than literally. The contradiction between the literal and symbolic interpretation of the Bible is brought out through exegesis.

The Fundamentalist has been performed in nine Finnish professional theaters between 2006 and 2010. Åbo Svenska Teater has performed it in Swedish under the name Fundamentalisten.

== Plot ==
=== Act one ===
Liberal priest Marcus tells the story of his twenty-year relationship with a woman with whom he is still in love. Many years ago in Lent-confirmation camp, as a priest, he tried seduce Heidi, ruining their relationship. Many years later, she returns with fundamentalist sermons. After years of spiritual crisis and an unlucky life, Heidi has found peace in an ultra-Orthodox community The Living Word. Marcus is preparing to publicize a critical theological work called "General Cleaning in the Cathedral", in which he questions the literalist reading of The Bible. Marcus considers it his duty to get Heidi out of the sect; while Heidi wants to convert Marcus. After several conversations about real and fictional content of the Gospels, Marcus realizes that his attempts to save Heidi are even more futile than he imagined: she is married to the community leader of The Living Word and bore him children.

=== Act two ===
For a while, Marcus and Heidi don't talk to each other. Marcus's book becomes a bestseller, and the press calls the author "a sensational priest". This prompts Heidi to return to conversations with Marcus again, since it seems to her that now he is not only going to hell himself, but also dragging others along with him.

Both heroes begin to doubt the correctness of their positions: Heidi becomes increasingly uncomfortable in her community, and Marcus notices that his fame is making him vain. In one of the conversations, he confesses to Heidi that he still loves her, and she reciprocates his feelings. With the development of a new stage in their relationship, Marcus realizes with horror that in fact he no longer loves this woman as much, and that her betrayal of her husband is of the same nature as her sectarianism. In Marcus, Heidi finds a new person to whom she can entrust her life. Marcus's attempt to explain to Heidi that she must finally think about herself provokes her mental seizure and suicide attempt. In the finale, Heidi is admitted into a psychiatric hospital.
