= Huuliveikot =

Finnish television series

Huuliveikot is a Finnish sketch comedy series produced and shown from 1998 to 1999 on the television channel Nelonen. The series starred the actor-imitators Juha Laitila, Jukka Laaksonen and Joonas Myllyveräjä. The same imitator trio had previously starred in the sketch comedy series Kiitos ja hyvästi produced by Yleisradio in the early 1990s. The series was based on various sketches and musical performances. The characters were mostly imitations of various celebrities.

The series was followed by a sequel series called Huuliveikkojen paluu, which ran in 1999 and 2000, as well as Huuliveikot Joulukalenteri (lit. 'Huuliveikot Advent Calendar') which ran in 2000 and consisted of 24 single-minute episodes.

== Characters and sketches ==
Some of the sketch characters also previously appeared in the imitator trio's earlier series Kiitos ja hyvästi.

- Martti Ahtisaari and his family
- Enska, Hanski and Simo: The titular character Simo has some kind of problem, and Enska and Hanski help him in his troubles. Every sketch ends with Enska and Hanski giving something to Simo, to which Simo replies from behind his thick eyeglasses: Tällast' mä oon aina halunnu (Finnish for "This is what I have always wanted").
- The meteorologist Nuha Rööri
- Rane the builder and Aarno from Tihviä: Rane always does everything better than Arska, for example building a detached house while Arska makes a candle holder from a couple of wooden blocks. Parodies the character Remontti-Reiska (played by Jorma Piisinen) from the show Joka kodin asuntomarkkinat.
- Tatti, Töppö and Syöppö
- Onnenspelit: A parody of Onnenpyörä, the Finnish version of the game show Wheel of Fortune.
- Rudi Sabotage
- Kostokskanava: A parody of shopping channels.
- Thilia Thalia lällällää: A parody of the quiz show Thilia Thalia.
- Remu
- Kalevi and Tero, homosexual bartenders
- Live Väänänen and his course of negative thinking
- Luontoilta: A parody of the Luontoilta nature show where one expert was called "the special expert of all fields everywhere".
- Syyserot: A parody of the show Kesähäät.

== Other ==
Juha Laitila and Jukka Laaksonen have later performed in a stand up comedy show called Ne Huuliveikot, containing stand up comedy and imitation.
