= Alhola =

- Country of origin: Finland

Original release
- Network: Yle TV2
- Release: 1991 – 1991

Alhola is a Finnish television comedy series that aired in 1991.

== Cast ==
- Lassi – Esko Varonen
- Unni – Hannu Raatikainen
- Manu – Petteri Rajanti
- Pauli – Markku Peltola
- Väinö Nesiä - Veikko Mylly
- Ellen Nesiä - Eeva-Liisa Haimelin
- Petteri Nesiä - Lasse Karkjärvi
- Kekki - Eero Saarinen
- Korpela - Raimo O. Niemi
- Marokkolainen tarjoilija - Henry Hanikka
- Tädit - Vappu Jurkka, Mervi Nuora, Ragni Grönblom, Sari Tirkkonen, Eira Jauckens and Meri Pakarinen
- Pasi-Arton – Outi Mäenpää
- Seppo Sillanpää

== See also ==
- List of Finnish television series
