= How to Kill a Bull (miniseries) =

Finnish television miniseries

- Genre: Miniseries
- Based on: How to Kill a Bull by Anna-Leena Härkönen
- Written by: Jussi Niilekselä; Merja Turunen
- Directed by: Jussi Niilekselä
- Starring: Santeri Kinnunen; Outi Alanen; Antti Majanlahti; Petri Lairikko; Maija-Liisa Majanlahti; Risto Salmi
- Composer: Jukka Siikavire
- Country of origin: Finland
- Original language: Finnish
- No. of episodes: 5

Production
- Running time: 5 × 30 minutes
- Production company: Yle

Original release
- Network: Yle TV2
- Release: 15 November – 13 December 1989

How to Kill a Bull (also known informally as The Poleax; Finnish: Häräntappoase) is a five-part Finnish television miniseries directed by Jussi Niilekselä, originally broadcast in 1989 on Yle TV2. It is based on the 1984 novel of the same name by Anna-Leena Härkönen. The miniseries is produced by Yleisradio. The miniseries was later published by the director as three-part 50-minute episodes.

The miniseries was awarded the 1989 Telvis Award as the best television program of the year.

== Plot summary ==
The main character of the miniseries is Alpo "Allu" Korva (Santeri Kinnunen), a young city dweller from Turku who is planning to go to Stockholm for the summer vacation with his friend Taala (Jukka Hiltunen). Against his will, he is sent by his mother (Tuija Vuolle) to spend the summer in the Torvenkylä village, located in Himanka, North Ostrobothnia, with his relatives to do hay work. At first, Allu sees his situation in the Takkunen family as unbearable, which is not helped at all by his boastful relative Rutanen (Antti Majanlahti), but the situation changes when he passionately sets his eyes on the wayward girl Kerttu (Outi Alanen).

== Cast ==
- Santeri Kinnunen as Alpo "Allu" Korva
- Outi Alanen as Kerttu Hurme
- Antti Majanlahti as Pasi Rutanen
- Petri Lairikko as Tauno Takkinen
- Maija-Liisa Majanlahti as Lahja Takkinen (Tauno's mother)
- Risto Salmi as Svante Takkinen (Tauno's father)
- Maria Aro as Anni Hurme (Kerttu's mother)
- Petri Manninen as Ripe
- Ilkka Pentti as Touko Mäkelin
- Minna Hämäläinen as Vuokko
- Jaakko Haapanen as Jaakko Hurme (Kerttu's father)
- Mauno Käpyaho as Toivo Tuuhonen
- Henna-Maija Alitalo as Kirsti Nyyssölä
- Riitta Räty as Mrs. Nyyssölä (Kirsti's mother)
- Antti Vartiala as Heikki Nyyssölä (Kirsti's father)
- Eero Junttila as Björn Nyyssölä (Kirsti's brother)
- Matti Viironen as Pekka (Allu's stepfather)
- Tuija Vuolle as Marketta Korva (Allu's mother)
- Jukka Hiltunen as Taala
- Seppo Kulmala as radiation meter
- Kari-Pekka Toivonen as Late
- Aino Pirskanen as bookmobile girl (uncredited)

== See also ==
- List of Finnish television series
