= Handu pumpulla =

- Country of origin: Finland

Original release
- Network: Nelonen
- Release: 2005 – 2005

Handu pumpulla is a Finnish television series. It aired on Finnish TV in 2005. The main characters are two middle-aged friends, Fjalle and Veksi, who lives in Helsinki. The storyline is about their everyday life, and they always talk in the old Helsinki local dialect, called Helsinki slangi, which makes them hard for others to understand. Only their wives seem to understand them perfectly. Veksi is acted by Pirkka-Pekka Petelius and Fjalle is done by Taneli Mäkinen.

== See also ==
- List of Finnish television series
