= Anna-Leena Härkönen =

Finnish writer and actress (born 1965)

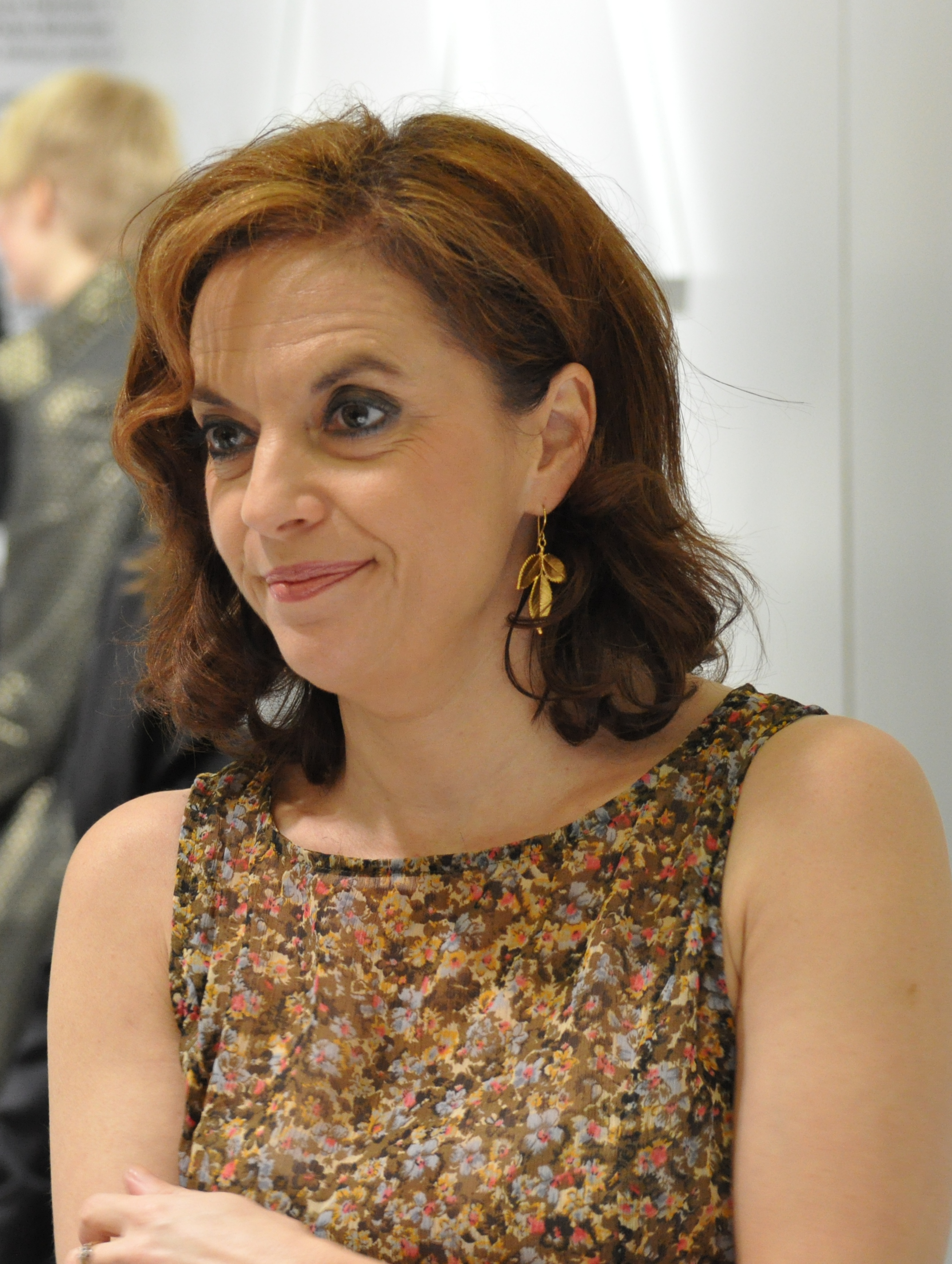
- Härkönen in 2011
- Born: Anna-Leena Mirjami Härkönen; 10 April 1965 (age 61); Liminka, Finland
- Occupations: Writer, actress
- Notable work: How to Kill a Bull (1984)

Anna-Leena Mirjami Härkönen (born 10 April 1965) is a Finnish writer and actress.

She was born in Liminka and studied acting at the college of drama and the University of Tampere's program of drama studies, which she concluded in 1989. She won the J. H. Erkko Award in 1984 for her debut novel How to Kill a Bull (Finnish: Häräntappoase).

A few dramatic productions, including one movie, have been adapted from Härkönen's works. Häräntappoase was made into a six-part television series and stage productions in Turku and Kotka and summer 2010 in Pyynikin kesäteatteri in Tampere. Scriptwriter Tove Idström and director Claes Olsson made a full-length movie based on Akvaariorakkautta ("Aquarium Love") which was released internationally as an art-house movie.

== Career ==
=== Writing ===
Härkönen gained significant publicity with her debut novel, Häräntappoase (The Ox-Killer), which was published in 1984 while she was in her second year at Kempele High School. The book was awarded the J. H. Erkko Award for best debut novel that same year. Härkönen graduated from high school in 1985. Häräntappoase has been adapted into two television series, one in 1989 and another in 2021, as well as a theatre adaptation.

Härkönen has long written columns for magazines such as Anna and Image. Her columns often explore the lives of young urbanites, their relationships, or the differences between men and women. She frequently depicts womanhood with self-irony and exaggeration, incorporating humorous everyday anecdotes. Härkönen has also authored autobiographical works. In 2001, she published Heikosti positiivinen (Weakly Positive), which focuses on motherhood, and in 2005, Loppuunkäsitelty (Finalized), which addresses her sister Killi's suicide.

In 2014, Härkönen released Takana puhumisen taito (The Art of Talking Behind Someone's Back), a campaign book published by the Booksellers' Association of Finland. It was available only during the international World Book and Copyright Day on 23 April 2014 and the two following days.

=== Acting ===
Härkönen studied acting at the University of the Arts Helsinki's Theatre Academy and the University of Tampere's Department of Acting Studies. She graduated with a Bachelor of Theatre Arts in 1989.

Härkönen gained public recognition as an actress through Mikko Niskanen's film Mona and the Time of Burning Love (Mona ja palavan rakkauden aika, 1983), in which she played a young high school girl who discovers Jesus. In 1988, Härkönen starred in the title role of the television film based on Minna Canth's play Anna Liisa, directed by Tuija-Maija Niskanen. Härkönen is also known for her role as Liisa Metsola in the television series Metsolat (1993–1995).

In the 2000s, Härkönen appeared in supporting roles in films such as Lovers & Leavers (2002), Beauty and the Bastard (2005), and Shadows of Happiness (2005).
