= How to Kill a Bull =

Novel by Anna-Leena Härkönen

- Cover of the first Finnish edition
- Author: Anna-Leena Härkönen
- Original title: Finnish: Häräntappoase
- Language: Finnish
- Genre: Young adult
- Publisher: Otava
- Publication date: 1984
- Publication place: Finland
- Media type: Print (Hardback)
- Pages: 316
- ISBN: 951-1-17887-3

How to Kill a Bull (Finnish: Häräntappoase) is a 1984 Finnish young adult novel by Anna-Leena Härkönen. It is Härkönen's debut novel, which she wrote at the age of 17. It is largely inspired by the 1951 novel The Catcher in the Rye by J. D. Salinger.

The novel won the J. H. Erkko Award as the best debut literature work of 1984. It went on to become one of the most popular books of the 1980s and one of the highest-selling debut novels in the history of Finnish literature. However, the work also caused a controversy due to its bold, sexual content.

== Plot ==
The main character of the novel is Alpo "Allu" Korva from Vaasa, who is a 16-year-old boy who has just finished comprehensive school. He is planning a summer vacation with his friend Taala. However, the plan goes wrong, because Allu's mother has arranged for him to work in the hay for the whole of July at her relatives Takkinen family in Torvenkylä, Himanka. Arriving in Torvenkylä, Allu has no idea how memorable the summer is coming.

Allu's companion in the summer is a boy named Pasi Rutanen, who has also come to work haying with the Takkinen family. Allu gets to know the young people of Torvenkylä, the most central of whom is the girl named Kerttu Hurme. Kerttu is a teenager rebelling against her mother, but also fundamentally a child-loving country girl. Allu falls in love with Kerttu, and that's how the "Romeo and Juliet" kind story of the country village begins.

== Television adaptations ==
Two television series have been made based on the novel. The first of them appeared in 1989 as a five-part miniseries directed by Jussi Niilekselä. In the series, Allu is played by Santeri Kinnunen and Kerttu is played by Outi Alanen.

In 2021, a more modernized television adaptation based on the novel was released for the Elisa Viihde streaming service. The most significant innovation for the series is changing the gender of the main character; Alpo "Allu" Korva from the original work was changed to Alexandra "Allu" Korva in the series, with which the central story became the love story of two teenage girls. In this series, Allu is played by Carola Hakola and Kerttu is played by Rebekka Baer.
