= Angela ja ajan tuulet =

- Country of origin: Finland
- No. of seasons: 1
- No. of episodes: 12

Original release
- Network: Yle TV1
- Release: 1999 – 1999

Angela ja ajan tuulet (lit. 'Angela and the winds of time') is a Finnish drama television series. Its twelve episodes were aired on Yle TV1 in 1999. The series is based on Jörn Donner's four Angela novels. It spans the years 1939 to 1956 and is set in Helsinki and the countryside.

== Cast ==
- Marika Parkkomäki – Angela
- Risto Tuorila – Gabriel
- Rea Mauranen – Karin
- Petra Frey – Agnes
- Esko Salminen – Erik
- Jaani Länsiö – Jakob (nuorena)
- Kristo Salminen – Jakob (aikuisena)
- Kari-Pekka Toivonen – Bengt
- Esa-Matti Pölhö – Thomas
- Antti Aro – Professori
- Milka Ahlroth – Gisela
- Esa Saari – Kenraali
- Sari Siikander – Raili
- Aarre Karén – Goldberg
- Sakari Jurkka – Wikström
- Vera Kiiskinen – Sigrid
- Aila Arajuuri – Vera
- Kari Sorvali – Karlsson
- Liisa Mustonen – Elisabeth
- Kaija Pakarinen – Alma
- Elina Knihtilä – Anna
- Miina Turunen – Lisa

== See also ==
- List of Finnish television series
