= Kalevala: The Story of Kullervo =

2026 Finnish historical fantasy film

- Original Finnish film poster
- Finnish: Kalevala: Kullervon tarina
- Directed by: Antti Jokinen
- Written by: Antti Jokinen; Jorma Tommila
- Based on: "The Story of Kullervo" of Kalevala by Elias Lönnrot
- Produced by: Johanna Enäsuo; Antti Jokinen; Marko Röhr
- Starring: Elias Salonen; Eero Aho
- Cinematography: Rauno Ronkainen
- Edited by: Joona Louhivuori
- Production companies: Storm Inc. ReelMedia Oy
- Distributed by: SF Studios
- Release date: 16 January 2026 (Finland)
- Running time: 143 minutes
- Country: Finland
- Language: Finnish
- Budget: €4.9 million

Kalevala: The Story of Kullervo (also known as Son of Revenge: The Story of Kalevala; Finnish: Kalevala: Kullervon tarina) is a Finnish historical fantasy film directed by Antti Jokinen. It is based on Finnish epic poetry, The Kalevala, telling the story of Kullervo, a tragic hero of the poetry. Elias Salonen is playing the film's title character.

The film is set in North Karelia in the 12th century, and was mainly filmed in Nurmes. Filming began in mid-September 2024. The film premiered on 16 January 2026.

== Cast ==
- Elias Salonen as Kullervo
- Eero Aho as Untamo
- Ilkka Koivula as Wäinö
- Ronja Kuoppamäki as Aino
- Olli Rahkonen as Ilmarinen
- Krista Kosonen as Kerttu
- Johannes Holopainen as Kalervo
- Janne Hyytiäinen as Kalevi
- Jaakko Ohtonen as Sampsa
- Oona Airola as Marjatta

== See also ==
- Kullervo Cycle
- List of Finnish films of the 2020s
- The Story of Kullervo – Book by J.R.R. Tolkien
