= SF-studio =

Finnish quiz show

SF-studio is a Finnish quiz show hosted by Simo Frangén. It replaced Frangén's earlier show Maailman ympäri in 2004 and ran until 2006.

Like Maailman ympäri, SF-studio was a themed show. This time the theme was news. The questions concerned people and events in recent news, and a short parody of a news report (with completely nonsensical contents) appears between each round.

Also like Maailman ympäri, SF-studio had four contestants, two of which were men and two women, and two were celebrities and two ordinary people.

SF-studio had one main prize: a holiday trip. Where the trip was located depended on the choices in the fourth and final round. There were five different options, starting from a cheap trip inside Finland, and getting progressively more expensive and further away, with the best option being a trip to some famous sunny beach holiday resort near the Equator.

Smaller prizes were recently published Finnish books, all autographed by some Finnish celebrity who had nothing whatsoever to do with either the book or its author.

== Rules ==
SF-studio consisted of four rounds. After each round, one contestant was dropped out.

=== Round one ===
The object of round one was to guess the name of a person who had lately been mentioned in the news.

There was a preset number of persons to guess, and Frangén began each of the questions by giving clues about the person's identity, starting difficult and getting easier along the way. This continued until one of the contestants gave a signal, at which point he/she had to answer.

Getting the answer right moved the contestant to round two. Getting the answer wrong forced the contestant to pass during the next question.

This continued until only one contestant was left.

=== Round two ===
Round two was a game with a "dare" element. There were six categories, whose names varied according to recent news.

The contestants had markers with two states: "I know" and "I don't know". One of the contestants was selected to pick a category, and Frangén asked a question about it. He/she had to turn his/her marker to "I know". The other two could pick "I know" or "I don't know" according to how they felt.

One of the contestants with their markers set to "I know" was randomly selected to answer. If the answer was right, he/she got a point, but if it was wrong, he/she lost a point. Contestants with their markers set to "I know" but who did not get to answer got a point regardless of the actual answer.

After all categories were used, the contestant with the fewest points was dropped out.

=== Round three ===
Round three was also played with six categories selected from recent news.

One of the two remaining contestants was selected to answer. After Frangén had asked the question, the contestant could either choose to answer or transfer the question.

A right answer earned the contestant one point and the next question was also asked from the same contestant. A wrong answer dropped the contestant back to 0 points, and the other contestant became the one to answer.

If the contestant instead decided to transfer the question, the other contestant had to answer it instead. The same rules as above applied, except that a transferred question could not be retransferred.

After all categories were used, the contestant with fewer points was dropped out.

=== Round four ===
Round four had five questions taken from recent news, all of which were multiple-choice questions with three choices. This round also had a "dare" element.

The contestant viewed the questions but did not answer them yet. He/she predicted how many he/she would get right. This would determine what prize he/she would get: If the contestant met his/her prediction, he/she would get a prize whose value depended how many questions he/she said he/she would get right, not on how many he/she actually got right. If the contestant did not meet the prediction, he/she would get nothing at all.

The contestant then answered all the questions. He/she was given a chance to change one of the answers, if he/she wanted to.

Then all answers were revealed. If enough answers were right, the contestant got a prize defined as above.

== Lottery game ==
SF-studio included a lottery game called Simon sää, in co-operation with Veikkaus. The name means "Simo's weather" and the draw took the form of a fictitious weather forecast, with the weather of ten Finnish cities or towns (including one town in Lapland that is actually named Simo) randomly selected from four different options.

This lottery game was not as popular as Maailman ympäri and has been stopped.
