= Simo Frangén =

Finnish comedian and screenwriter

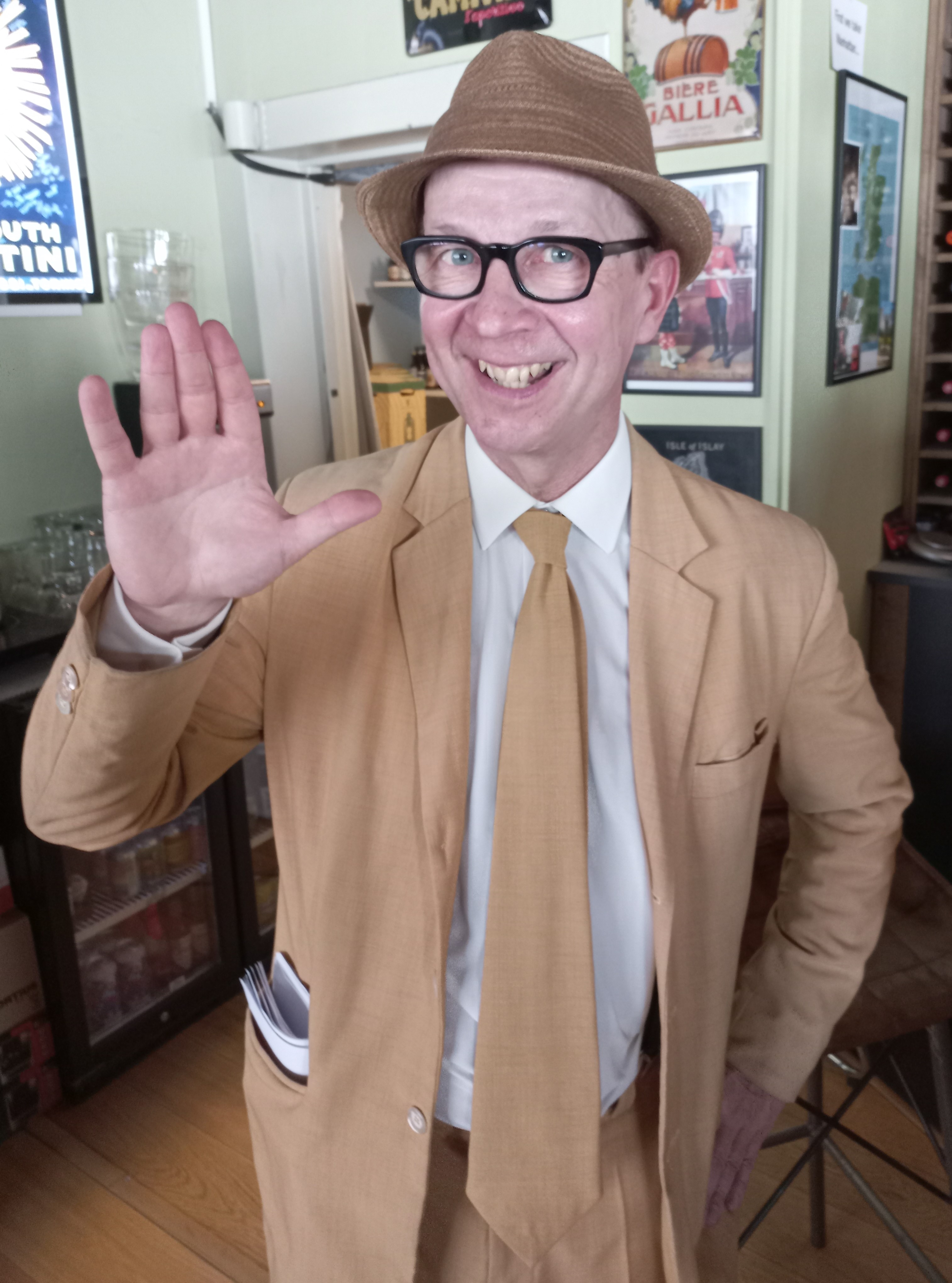
- Frangén in Turku in June 2023
- Born: Simo Juhani Frangén; 6 September 1963 (age 63); Ulvila, Finland
- Notable work: Alivaltiosihteeri, Maailman ympäri, SF-Studio
- Spouse: Rosa Meriläinen (–2017)

Simo Juhani Frangén (born 6 September 1963 in Ulvila, Finland) is a Finnish TV presenter and humourist, living in Tampere.

== History ==
Frangén matriculated in 1982 and graduated as a Master of Social Sciences at the University of Tampere in 1990. His jobs include Nakkila city dump watchman in 1982, University of Tampere students' union journalist (on the magazine Aviisi) in 1987, journalist on the Tampere City magazine in 1988, assistant journalist on the humour magazine Pahkasika from 1983 to 1990 and assistant journalist on the magazine Rumba in 1985.

== TV and radio work ==
Since 1990, Frangén has worked with Pasi Heikura and Jyrki Liikka on the show Alivaltiosihteeri on the YLE radio stations. He has also directed and written the Radiomafia show Kaupparatsu Frangén, appeared on the show Ekoisti on YLE TV2 in "Master Frangén's tip shop" and most recently, on two Finnish TV quiz shows:

- Maailman ympäri from 2000 to 2004
- SF-Studio from 2004 to 2006

Frangén has received the following awards:

- Venla for best TV performer in 2001
- Telvis for best male TV performer in 2002
- Musiikki & Media for TV personality of the year in 2001
- Tamperean of the year in 2001
