= Se on siinä =

Finnish sports quiz show

Se on siinä (Finnish for "That's it") was a Finnish humorous television sports quiz show shown on Sunday nights on YLE TV2 from 2001 to 2009. It was awarded the Venla-award for the best entertainment program voted by TV-viewers.

The host of Se on siinä was a popular sports commentator Antero Mertaranta. There were three contestants on the game. Two of them were regular: actor Risto Kaskilahti and comedian Jukka Laaksonen. The third contestant was a celebrity guest. There have been many well-known foreigner guests like sprinter Ben Johnson, basketball player Dennis Rodman and ice hockey player Börje Salming, but usually the guests were Finnish athletes or other celebrities. The show could also involve musical performances.

Maybe the most renowned regular joke of the show was so called "rabbit gag", a video clip where a rabbit makes invasion to the piste during biathlon competition and runs a while above the group of skiers like an artificial rabbit in greyhound racing. The clip was shown sometimes when some of the competitor asks. The ending part of the show was a night tale by Mertaranta, a parody-style little story about current events and people told in the fairy tale way.
