= 6pack =

- Country of origin: Finland

Original release
- Network: Yle TV1
- Release: 2008 – 2008

6pack is a Finnish television series. It was aired in 2008.

== See also ==
- List of Finnish television series
