= Saunavuoro =

Finnish television sketch show

Saunavuoro (meaning "sauna turn" or "time for sauna") is a Finnish TV comedy show, similar to The Fast Show or Smack the Pony in the UK. It was shown on YLE TV1 from 2004 to 2005.

Saunavuoro is themed to look like it was filmed in the 1960s. Its most famous character is Finnish president Urho Kekkonen and his adjutant, but there are some other regular characters as well.

Some of the sketches include:

- Kekkonen and his adjutant in the sauna. Kekkonen is naked (but still wears his eyeglasses), while his adjutant wears a full military dress uniform. They talk about everyday matters.
- Kekkonen preparing for an official televised announcement. He always begins by saying "Kansalaiset. Medborgare." This means "citizens" in both Finnish and Swedish and refers how the real Kekkonen began his announcements.
- Kekkonen and his adjutant out in the nature. Kekkonen asks his adjutant to do various things, such as make bird calls.
- A group of three women working in a sewing factory. They hold a "If were some kind of object, what would I be?" with the type of object varying. Two of them are then described as luxurious objects but the third as mundane.
- A female industrial worker coming to complain to her male boss about intolerably bad working conditions. The boss, completely ignoring her, breaks out a guitar and starts playing, as if the worker wasn't even there.
- A woman going out in the nature to hunt for ducks, when a man who has a crush on her appears. The woman has to fend him off.
- A man trying to buy clothes, either for himself or his wife. The salesman refuses, spinning wild theories on how buying the clothes will lead to drastic sexual crimes. He then phones the police to come arrest the man.
- Three rich country-side land-owners having a contest on how large and expensive things they've recently bought. The third man's acquisitions are always ridiculously overdone.
- Two ice hockey players in the off-side box. While out on the ice, they are fierce players, but the moment they step into the off-side box, they start talking about philosophy, art, politics or technical things instead. When they go back to play, they become fierce again.
