= Rieku ja Raiku =

Finnish comic strip

Rieku ja Raiku is a Finnish comic strip aimed at an adult audience.

== Background ==
The strip originally began as a parody of an earlier comic called Kieku ja Kaiku. Kieku ja Kaiku was an educational children's comic about two anthropomorphic young roosters. One character, Kaiku, would often make foolish mistakes, while Kieku would intervene to provide a lesson or educational message. The dialogue was written entirely in poetic verse.

== Content ==
Rieku ja Raiku is targeted at a more mature readership. It features the adult male birds Rieku and Raiku, whose stories mostly revolve around going to bars, drinking alcohol, and attempting to court female birds. The poetic verse of the dialogue has been retained, but the educational messaging has been removed.

The art style is more cartoonish and less realistic than its predecessor, reflecting the shift to adult humor.

== Publication ==
The strip is published in several magazines that cater to young adults and middle-aged readers.
