= Jokainen vieras on laulun arvoinen =

Finnish music television series

Jokainen vieras on laulun arvoinen is a Finnish reality TV music television series which aired on Subtv from 5 January to 9 March 2007. It featured Zarkus Poussa who would compose, write lyrics and record a song for the people. It was broadcast in ten 30-minute episodes. The program was filmed between May and June 2006.

The program's name refers to Veikko Lavi's perhaps best-known song "Jokainen ihminen on laulun arvoinen".
