= Metsolat =

- Genre: Drama
- Created by: TV2 Drama
- Written by: Carl Mesterton; Anna-Liisa Mesterton; Curt Ulfstedt; Heikki Vuento; Miisa Lindén
- Directed by: Carl Mesterton
- Starring: Ahti Haljala; Helinä Viitanen; Kari Hakala; Svante Martin; Katriina Honkanen; Jaana Raski
- Composers: Juha Tikka; Esa Kaartamo
- Country of origin: Finland
- No. of seasons: 3
- No. of episodes: 41

Production
- Producer: Raimo Mikkola
- Cinematography: Timo Kapanen
- Editor: Carl Mesterton
- Running time: 45–65 minutes per episode
- Production company: Yleisradio

Original release
- Network: Yle TV2
- Release: 13 January 1993 – 25 October 1995

Metsolat was a Finnish drama television series produced by Yleisradio and aired between 1993 and 1995. Directed and edited by Carl Mesterton, the series was co-written by Mesterton alongside his wife Anna-Lisa Mesterton, Curt Ulfstedt, and Miisa Lindén. The series depicts the life of a fictional small-scale farming family living in Hoikka, a municipality in the Kainuu region, from midsummer 1987 to Christmas 1996. The series gained significant popularity, with over a million viewers per episode.

The story and its subsequent events have been adapted into five novels, all of which have since sold out.

In 1994, Metsolat received the Pro Maaseutu award and an honorary certificate from the Telvis press jury. The following year, Carl Mesterton was awarded the Special Telvis Award, and the series received the Kunniakämmen award from the Invalidiliitto (Finnish Disabled Persons Association) for being the best Finnish television program addressing disability.

== Plot ==
Antti and Annikki Metsola (née Leppävaara) live on a small farm called Leppävaara in the fictional municipality of Hoikka, located in Kainuu. Annikki's mother resides in her own cottage on the farm, which she co-owns with Annikki after her father's death. Antti, whose family farm was ceded to the Soviet Union in 1944, lives at Leppävaara as a son-in-law. The couple has three sons—Risto, Heikki, and Erkki—and two daughters, Jaana and Eeva. Risto lives in Tampere with his wife Raija and their children, Lasse and Liisa. Heikki resides in Sweden with his wife Kristina and their two sons. Erkki remains at Leppävaara, while Jaana lives in Sotkamo with her husband Jaakko Järvenheimo, working as a cosmetologist. The youngest, Eeva, studies medicine in Tampere.

Erkki serves as the protagonist, with Kari Kaukovaara, a large-scale farmer, as his antagonist. The central plotline follows Erkki's efforts to develop and operate a ski resort, Urjan Rinteet, amidst opposition from Kari. Other storylines explore the lives of Antti and Annikki's children. Risto, after losing his job, returns to Hoikka and faces the dissolution of his marriage. Jaana and Jaakko relocate to Tampere, where Jaakko rebuilds his career, and Jaana becomes a successful entrepreneur. Eeva graduates as a doctor and marries Stig Eklund but faces challenges when Stig is paralyzed in a car accident. Their marriage stabilizes over time. Among the grandchildren, Liisa's story stands out as she establishes an organic farm near Leppävaara with her idealistic partner Osmo Lampinen. Episodes often begin at Leppävaara, transitioning to events at Urjan Rinteet, the Hoikka health center, or locations tied to the children's lives.

Key supporting characters include Kari's sister Helena, who marries Erkki in 1991 but dies in 1993, and Riitta Vanhanen, who becomes Erkki's secretary and later his wife. Additional roles feature Stig's father, Helena's first husband, and various community figures such as Eino Vanhanen and his uncle Arvo, the bank manager, and Liisa's former flame Turo. The Kaukovaara family shares distant ties with the Leppävaaras, stemming from Annikki's family history. The first season (1987–1990) takes place during Finland's economic boom and the start of the 1990s recession, with the second and third seasons (1991–1993) focusing on the recession's depth. The epilogue-like final episode reflects on post-recession life and includes a flashback to a Christmas during World War II.

== Cast ==
- Ahti Haljala as Antti Metsola
- Helinä Viitanen as Annikki Metsola (née Leppävaara)
- Kari Hakala as Erkki Metsola
- Svante Martin as Risto Metsola
- Anna-Leena Härkönen as Liisa Metsola
- Katriina Honkanen as Eeva Metsola-Eklund (née Metsola)
- Jaana Raski as Jaana Järvenheimo (née Metsola)
- Esko Raipia as Jaakko Järvenheimo
- Juha Hyppönen as Kari Kaukovaara
- Mikael Andersson as Stig Eklund
- Anu Hälvä as Helena Metsola (formerly Meriläinen, née Kaukovaara)
- Jari Salmi as Osmo Lampinen

== Production ==
=== Series concept and screenwriting ===
The idea for the Metsolat series originated when director and screenwriter Carl Mesterton complained to Yle executive Risto Volanen after a television production course about the difficulties of getting young screenwriters, directors, and producers to work together in a group. Mesterton half-jokingly suggested they create a series about a farming family from Kainuu. Politically aligned with the Centre Party, Volanen was enthusiastic about the idea and encouraged Mesterton to write the series himself. Volanen also approached the head of Yle TV2, and according to Mesterton, "the series was approved immediately." Another Centre Party-aligned executive, Tapio Siikala, ensured that the expensive, long-term production received funding.

To produce Metsolat, Mesterton had to resign from Yleisradio and establish his own company at age 60 because Yle refused to facilitate an internal transfer from its Swedish-language division in Helsinki to Yle TV2 in Tampere. However, the series' success ultimately worked in Mesterton's favor, as he received full compensation for his work as both writer and director, as well as royalties from all future releases of the series.

The fictional municipality of Hoikka was modeled after Puolanka. Mesterton and his team interviewed locals, observed life on farms, and learned about practical details such as milk transportation and bus services. Puolanka's municipal manager described the area's challenging employment situation and its impact on residents. Puolanka also inspired the family of Antti and Annikki Metsola. Mesterton recalled a local elder showcasing photos of his five children, which became a significant influence on the series. Mesterton's background in legal studies and citizens' legal issues informed the detailed portrayal of topics like property transactions, inheritances, and business foundations.

Mesterton co-wrote the first season's 21 episodes with Curt Ulfstedt. For the second and third seasons and the special Christmas of Memories episode, Mesterton invited actress Miisa Lindén (who played Riitta Vanhanen) and his wife Anna-Lisa Mesterton to join the writing team. Lindén described the writing process as democratic, with Mesterton being patient with her as a less experienced writer. The team spent long periods together discussing the characters and plot arcs, after which they wrote independently and shared drafts via floppy disks. They collaboratively revised the scripts, resulting in a seamless final product where individual contributions were indistinguishable.

=== Filming ===
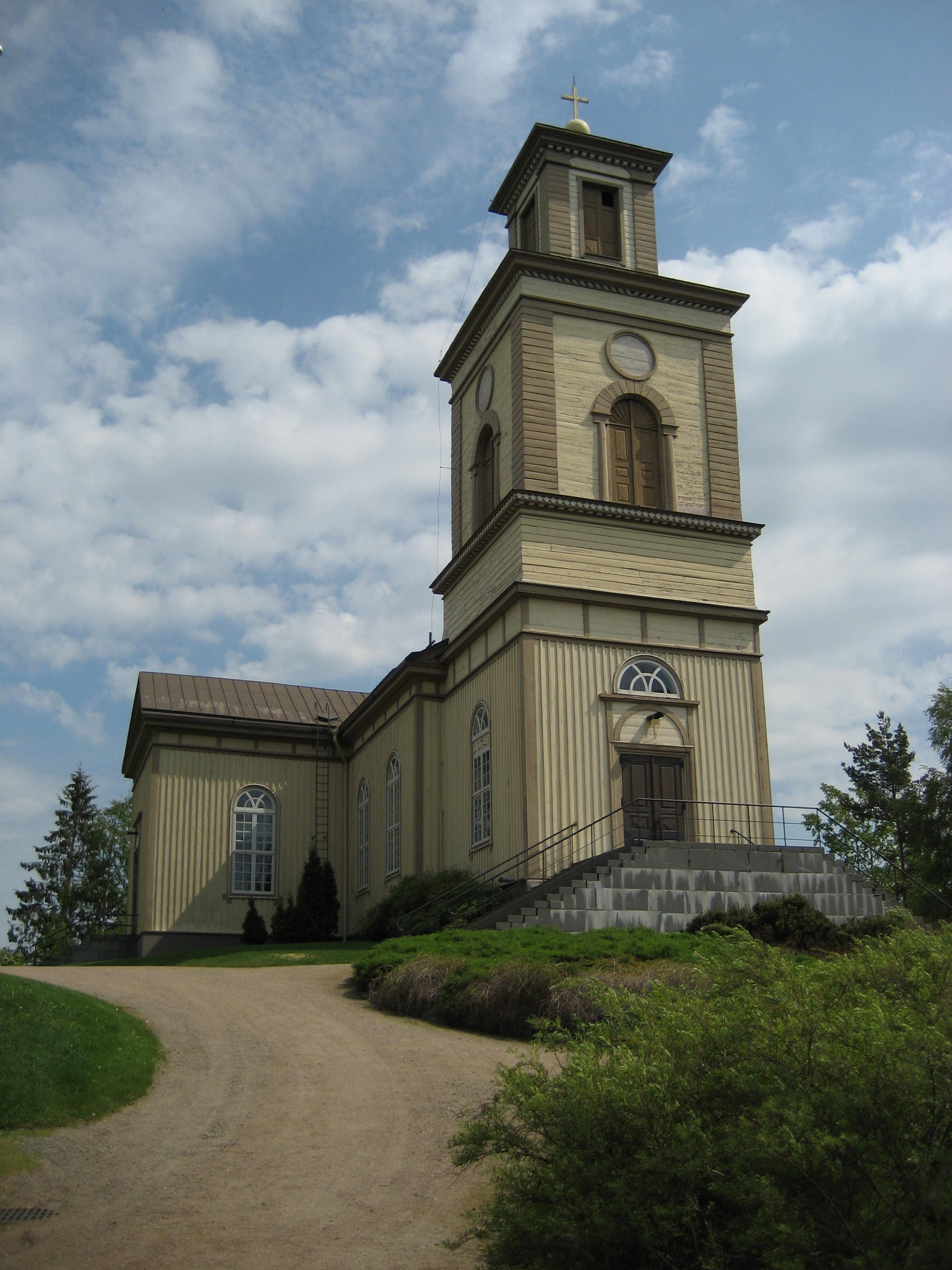
Suodenniemi Church served as Hoikka Church in the series.

Director-screenwriter Carl Mesterton and producer-production manager Raimo Mikkola were key figures in the production process. Mikkola, with 25 years of experience, was instrumental in selecting filming locations. Mesterton regarded him as Finland's best production manager and location scout. The series was produced over five years, with filming beginning in January 1991 and concluding in June 1995. The production involved 278 filming days, 1,724 scenes, 71 actors, 730 amateur performers and extras, 32.5 hours of finished episodes, and 166 hours of footage. Each 50-minute episode required approximately four hours of raw material. The production team adopted American production planning systems, meticulously scheduling scenes to 15-minute intervals.

Most filming locations were near Tampere, particularly in Mouhijärvi, with only two days of on-location shooting in Kainuu during the first season. The production team took care to depict Kainuu authentically, using props and daily items to reflect the region. For example, the Leppävaara farmhouse was filmed on a property in Mouhijärvi, while its grandmother's cottage was a dismantled house reassembled on set.

The Soini farm in Mouhijärvi, discovered by Mikkola through local contacts, became the Kaukovaaran farmstead, where all its interior and exterior scenes were shot. Other locations included Suodenniemi Church for Hoikka Church and Sappee Ski Resort for the Urjanlinna ski center. Additional scenes were filmed in Kainuu locations such as Sotkamo (Naapurinvaara) and Ristijärvi (Saukkovaara).
