= Maajussille morsian =

Finnish reality television series

Maajussille morsian is a Finnish reality television series based on the British reality show Farmer Wants a Wife. The show was first hosted by Mia Halonen (2006), and then by Miia Nuutila (2007–2016). The current host is Vappu Pimiä (2017–present). Maajussille morsian airs on MTV3, and as of 2025, the show has had 17 seasons and is still airing new episodes.

== Season 1 (2006) ==
Farmer	Age	Profession	Location
Teemu Haimi	26	Farmer	Valkeala
Anssi Mäki-Jaakkola	20	Tomato farmer	Eurajoki
Harri Ojala	33	Pig farmer	Ikkeläjärvi
Risto Pelkonen	31	Farmer	Puponmäki
Jussi Rossi	46	Beekeeper	Suonenjoki

== Season 2 (2007) ==
Farmer	Age	Profession	Location
Seppo Korpi	22	Dairy farmer	Jalasjärvi
Sami Kauppinen	33	Farm tourism entrepreneur	Halmeniemi
Juha Korhonen	21	Suckler cow breeder-farmer	Sotkamo
Tuomas Bährend	32	Rancher entrepreneur	Sahalahti

== Season 3 (2008) ==
Farmer	Age
Ari "Ape" Hakkarainen	27
Jussi Jukkola	19
Jani Kivilahti	31
Jouni Kukkohovi	37
Aslak Niittyvuopio	34
