= Ajoneuvos =

Finnish automotive television series

Ajoneuvos presenter Jussi Halli

Ajoneuvos is a 2006 Finnish driving television series broadcast in Finland on MTV3 since March 18, 2006. The series is presented by Jussi Halli.
