= EVVK =

Finnish comedy television series

EVVK (pronounced [ˈeːˌʋeːˌʋeːˌkoː]) is a Finnish comedy TV show. It aired on MTV3 from 2004 to 2005.

The name EVVK comes from a Finnish acronym of Ei vois(i) vähempää kiinnostaa, an almost direct translation of the English language expression "I couldn't care less", and with the same meaning. Particularly in acronymic form, the expression is still fairly recent, and many Finns consider its use juvenile. The phrase originates from a comedy TV-series by the group Lapinlahden Linnut.

The TV show EVVK was shown on the relatively new TV channel SubTV at late night. It consisted mainly of various kinds of humour aimed at an adolescent or young adult audience. It gained some publicity in Finnish magazines by occasionally finishing off with a short scene of the Finnish model Jasmin Mäntylä lying nude on her bed, but tastefully obscured by the bedcovers.
