= Jasmin Mäntylä =

Finnish model and singer (born 1982)

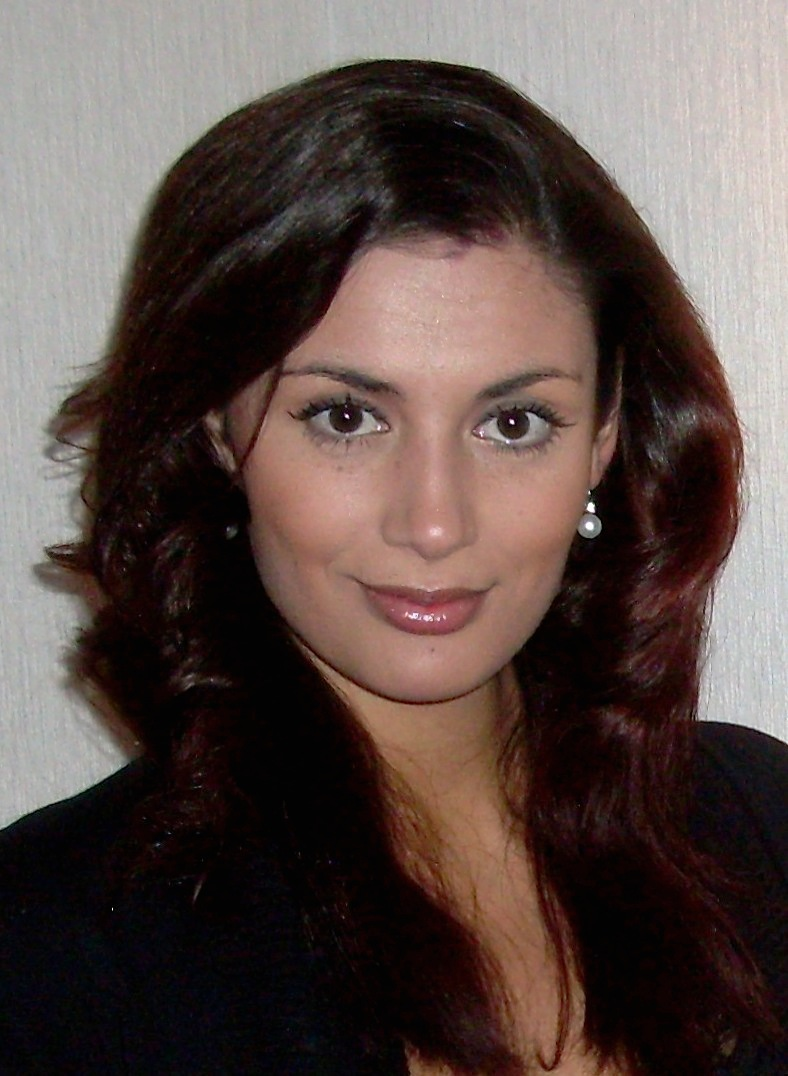
Jasmin Vähäkangas

Jasmin Vähäkangas (née Mäntylä; born 7 August 1982) is a Finnish model and singer. She has also worked in politics in her hometown. She is a member of the Finnish National Coalition Party. Vähäkangas is 5 ft 9 3/4 in (1.772 m) tall. She is the daughter of Finnish and Indian parents.

== Career ==
Born in Oulu to a Finnish mother and Indian father, Mäntylä began her career as a model when she was only twelve years old. She was a finalist in Miss Hawaiian Tropic Finland and Model Queen Finland when she was thirteen years old. She won the Miss Model of the World competition in 1999. At the age of seventeen, while working for the modeling agency Fashion Team, she moved to Turku. She also appeared in a music video by Sash! and Dr. Alban, titled "Colour the World", in 1999.

Mäntylä began her singing career in 2001. Her first album Luoksein jää (Stay with me) was released in 2002. She also performed on the TV show EVVK for MTV3 and in commercials. In the summer of 2004, Mäntylä worked as a PR hostess in Haapamäki.

Mäntylä moved back to her hometown of Oulu in 2004, and continued her career as a singer. She studied travel agency business and graduated in 2006. She worked in radio for a year and started her own business in late 2007.

== Legal troubles ==
Mäntylä was convicted of aggravated drunk driving and reckless endangerment in 2006. She was sentenced to 40 days of probation and had to pay a fine. In January 2009, she announced she had changed her way of life, having given up alcohol.

== Politics ==
Mäntylä has been a member of the Finnish political party Kokoomus since she was eighteen years old. She worked as a member of the Oulu city council before announcing that she would no longer run for election, instead continuing as an employee of the party.

== Personal life ==
In 2012, Mäntylä got engaged with Dennis Bramley, a 62-year-old retired builder from Middlesbrough, England. They got married in September 2014 and she moved in with him. The couple separated in December 2015, and now Mäntylä is partly living in Australia with her new partner, local businessman called Richard Tester.

Mäntylä has also worked and lived in Greece.

Mäntylä married Marko Vähäkangas on 30 June 2023 and changed her surname to Vähäkangas.

Jasmin Vähäkangas gave birth to a baby boy in March 2025. She and her husband named their son Ossian Angus Vähäkangas. {https://www.mtvuutiset.fi/artikkeli/jasmin-vahakankaan-lapsi-sai-nimen/9144946}
