= Pulkkinen (TV series) =

- Written by: Juha Jokela
- Starring: Jari Salmi; Antti Virmavirta
- Country of origin: Finland
- Original language: Finnish

Production
- Running time: 22−23 minutes
- Production company: Production House

Original release
- Network: Nelonen; Jim (replacement); Yle TV2
- Release: 6 September 1999 – 18 March 2002

Pulkkinen was a Finnish sketch series which broadcast between 1999 and 2002, starring actors Jari Salmi and Antti Virmavirta. The series was written by Juha Jokela and is known for its courageous humor. Pulkkinen's first season was released on DVD in 2005 and the second season in 2006. The third and last series was published in October 2006.

The series features two famous Elvis Presley songs though imitation: Burning Love and See See Rider. The latter song is used as the opening and the closing song, which the radio DJ "Osmo" playfully refers as "Äshönsii".
