= Alivaltiosihteeri =

Finnish comedy group

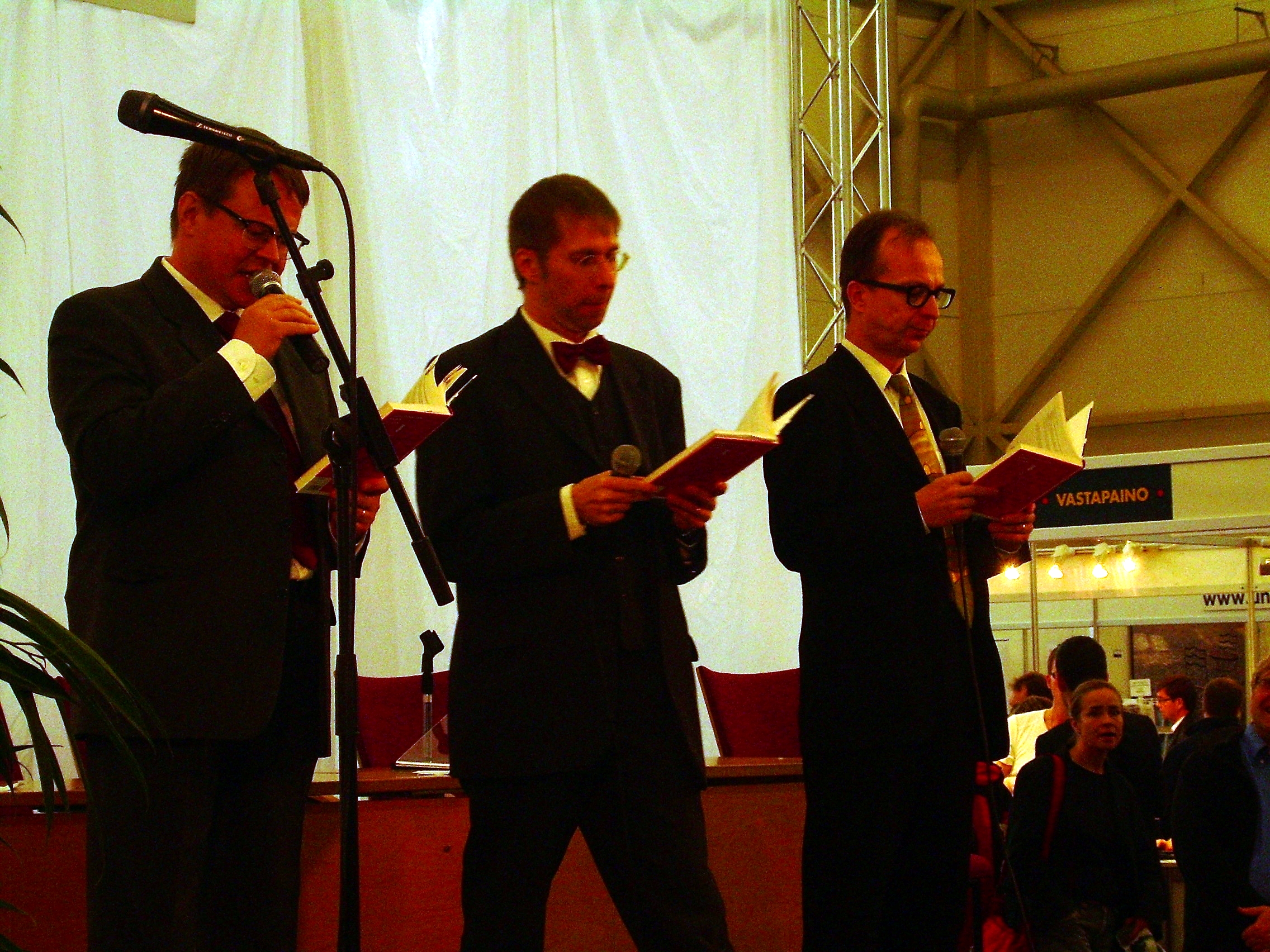
Alivaltiosihteeri (2008). From left to right: Pasi Heikura, Jyrki Liikka and Simo Frangén.

Alivaltiosihteeri ("Undersecretary of State") is a Finnish comedy group currently consisting of Simo Frangén, Pasi Heikura and Jyrki Liikka. It started as a band in 1985 but has since made both the weekly radio show Alivaltiosihteeri and a few TV shows. Books based on the radio shows have also been published.

== Band ==
The band Alivaltiosihteeri was formed in the mid-1980s in Tampere, Finland, consisting of four members: bassist Simo Frangén, lead guitarist Pasi Heikura, drummer Jyrki Liikka and singer Satu Kurvinen, who was later replaced by Matti Toivonen. The band was active from 1985 to the mid-1990s, but since then has concentrated on comic radio shows, books and even TV shows.

== Radio program ==
Since 1990 the first three members of the group have made weekly hour-long radio shows for the Finnish national broadcasting company Yleisradio (Alivaltiosihteeri - Suomen virallinen ohjelma, strictly translated Alivaltiosihteeri - the official program of Finland). The humour used in the shows is based on playing on words and the style is dry and official throughout, no matter what the subject is (deadpan). Every week two new palindromes are released, read both forwards and backwards. One of the songs played during program is always chosen from the albums by Neil Young (in the early 1990s AC/DC was used).
