= Twilight Guardians =

Finnish power metal band

- Origin: Salo, Finland
- Genres: Power metal
- Years active: 1996−2008
- Labels: Musea, Spinefarm

Twilight Guardians was a power metal band from Salo, Finland. Formed in 1996, they were most famous for their 2007 album Ghost Reborn, and also achieved minor notoriety for their 2006 cover of Madonna's 1987 single "La Isla Bonita", from their third album Sin Trade.

They were signed to Spinefarm Records.

== Discography ==
- Land of the Kings (EP - 1998)
- Tales of the Brave (2000, Musea)
- Wasteland (2004, Spinefarm)
- Sin Trade (2006, Spinefarm)
- Ghost Reborn (2007, Spinefarm)
- Legacy (2011) Best Of

== Members ==
- Vesa Virtanen – vocals
- Carl Johann Gustafsson – guitar
- Mikko Tang – bass
- Henri Suominen – drums
- Jari Pailamo – synthesizers, Hammond organ
