= Me stallarit =

Finnish television sitcom

- Genre: Political satirical sitcom
- Created by: Matti Kinnunen; Roope Lehtinen; Timo Varpio
- Written by: Juha Jokela; Timo Varpio
- Directed by: Matti Kinnunen
- Starring: Seppo Halttunen; Pirkko Hämäläinen; Mervi Takatalo; Olli Johansson; Jukka Rasila; Tommi Korpela
- Composer: Kerkko Koskinen
- Country of origin: Finland
- Original language: Finnish
- No. of seasons: 1
- No. of episodes: 12

Production
- Producer: Roope Lehtinen
- Cinematography: Rauno Ronkainen
- Editor: Jari Heikkinen
- Production company: Moskito Television

Original release
- Network: MTV3
- Release: September 7 – November 23, 2004

Me stallarit (Finnish for "we Stalinists") is a Finnish political satirical television sitcom created by Matti Kinnunen, Roope Lehtinen and Timo Varpio. The series ran from September 7, 2004 to November 23, 2004 (total 12 episodes). The series aired on MTV3, and it was produced by Moskito Television.

Me stallarit is about a Taistoist family living in Merihaka, Helsinki, in the 1970s. The series' tagline was: "Tervetuloa aikaan, joka ei koskaan palaa. Onneksi." ("Welcome to an era which will never return. Fortunately.")
