= Benner & Benner =

Finnish television series

- Country of origin: Finland

Original release
- Network: MTV3
- Release: 2001 – 2002

Benner & Benner is a Finnish legal drama television series set in Helsinki. It first aired on the Finnish MTV3 channel on 15 October 2001 and last aired in 2002, after 18 episodes of 45 minutes.

The series was written by Kirsti and Katri Manninen.

The lead actress Milka Ahlroth played Silja Benner, a strict lawyer who balances managing her decaying marriage and various legal cases. The program also had a supernatural side: Rafael Mustavuori, the law office cleaner played by Kristo Salminen, fell in love with Silja during the series and later turned out to be an angel. The program garnered both praise and criticism.

In 2002, Benner & Benner received an honourable mention for the fiction series at the television and radio education fund Koura's award ceremony.
