= Karpolla on asiaa =

Finnish television show

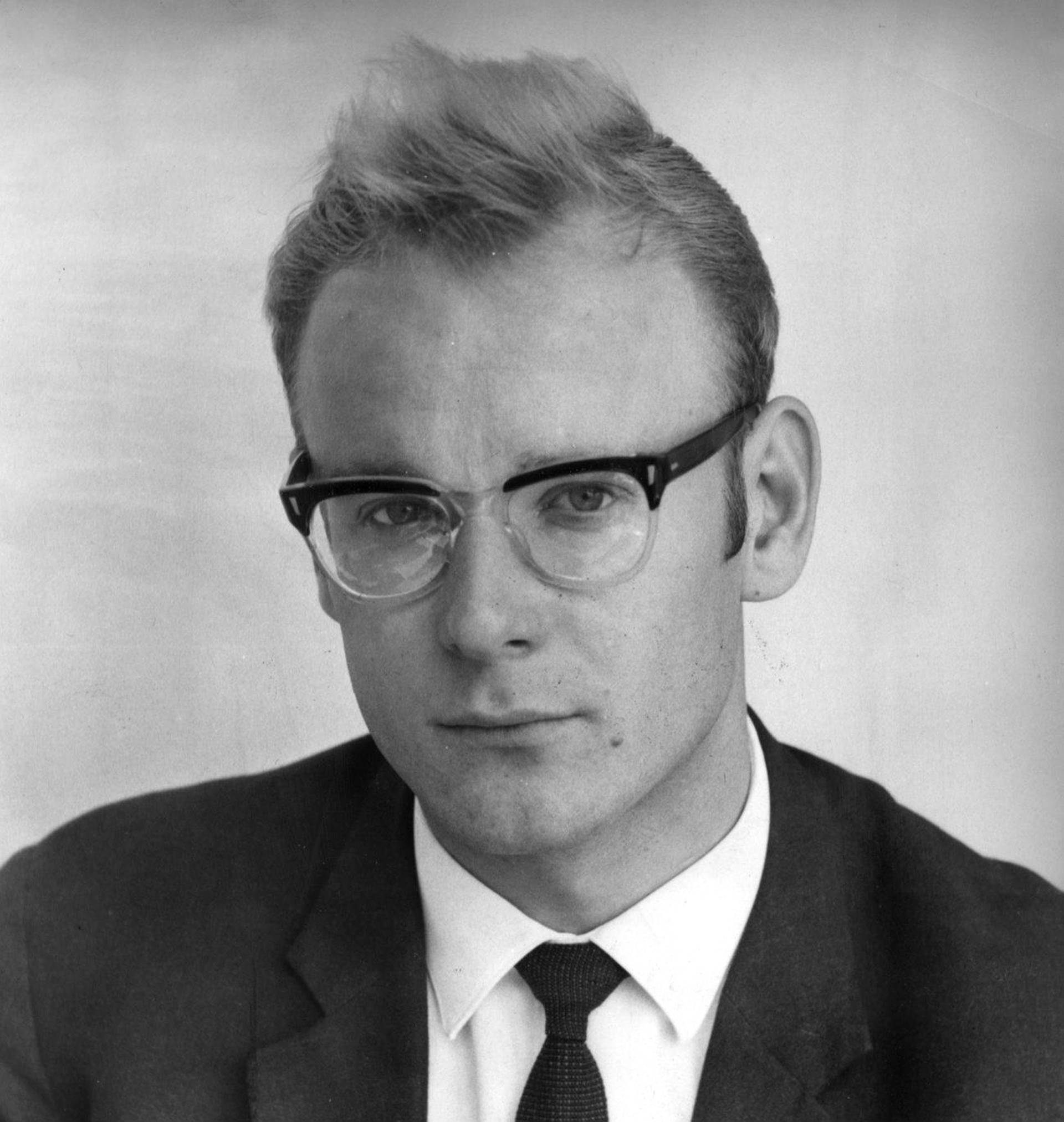
Hannu Karpo

Karpolla on asiaa ("Karpo has something to say", known also during some seasons as Karporaattori and Kyllä kansa tietää) is a popular Finnish television show with a journalistic touch that ran from 1983 to 2007 on MTV3. It was hosted by reporter Hannu Karpo and produced by his Pallosalama OY production company. The show also featured occasional appearances by Karpo's son, Sampo.

The show's essential idea was that Karpo would report on the various things he saw wrong about Finnish society and have "the people's story heard" by reporting how certain people in Finnish society were suffering from public oversight and abuse, and were unable to do anything to resolve their predicament. Karpo would famously and openly award his interviewees with piece of smoked reindeer or an encased 100 mk (later €100) bill for speaking out.

A popular contest on the show was the recurring "Santa Claus of the Year" contest during which a famous Finnish person posing as Santa Claus was interviewed by either Karpo or a small child, dropping hints as to the Santa's true identity with the Santa revealing his identity soon before or after Christmas Eve. The contest was not held in 2004 due to the show being on hiatus and instead a different contest was held in November.

During the show's early run Karpo would also give financial or material aid to the various people on his show. This ended after Karpo realised that the aid was being misused.

From its very first episode until 1992, it was screened on YLE as part of the MTV programming block.
