= Hannu Karpo =

Finnish reporter (1942–2025)

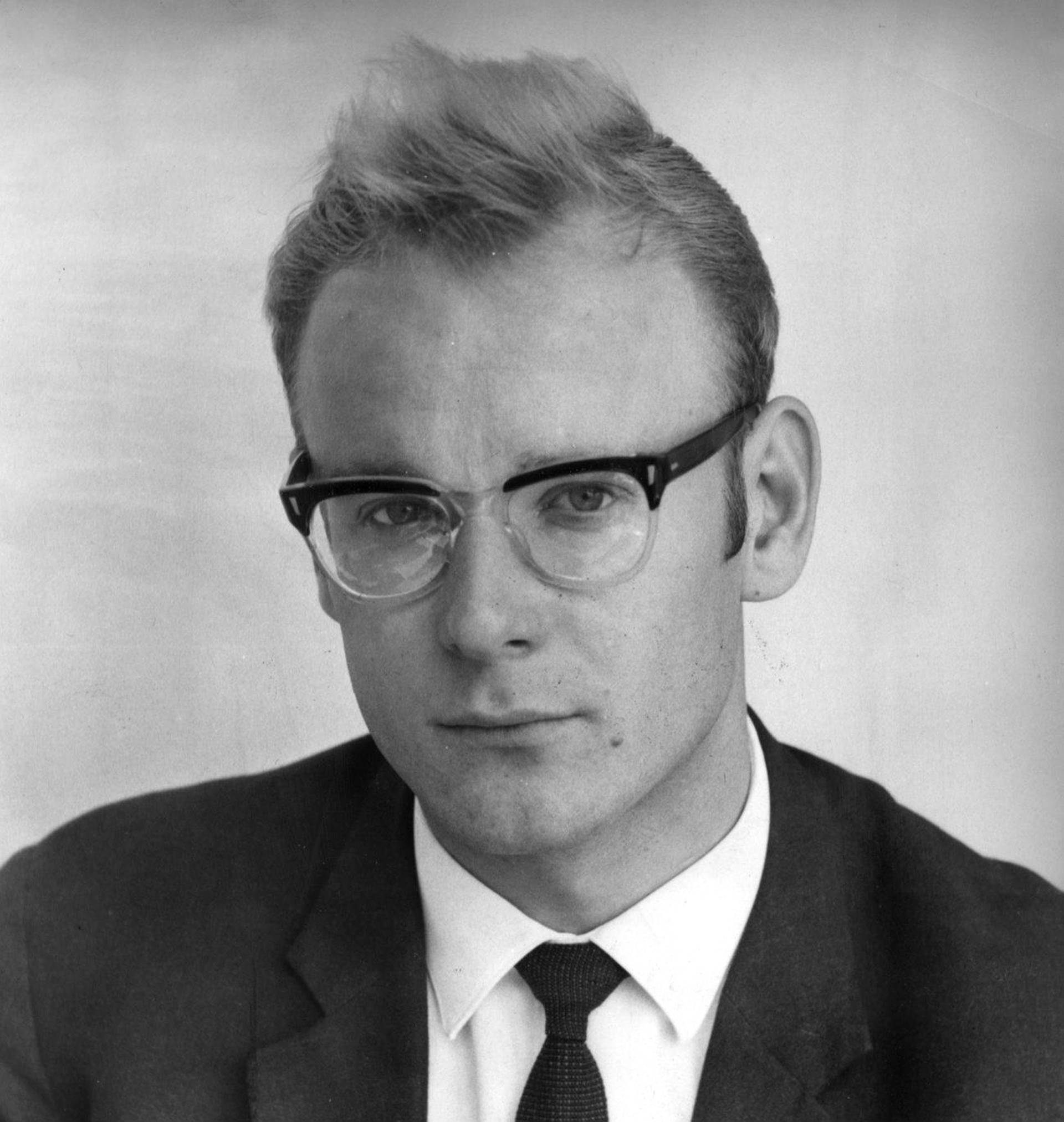
- Karpo in 1965
- Born: 5 March 1942; Helsinki, Finland
- Died: 18 March 2025 (aged 83)
- Occupation: Reporter

Hannu Karpo (5 March 1942 – 18 March 2025) was a Finnish reporter who hosted his own show, Karpolla on asiaa, from 1981 to 2007. He was a reporter for Yleisradio from 1961 to 1981 before moving over to the competing network (MTV3). His own show was produced by his privately owned production company Pallosalama Oy which he founded in 1970.

Karpo was awarded a Lifetime Achievement Golden Venla award in 2015 along with fellow TV personality Riitta Väisänen.

== Early life ==
Karpo was born in Helsinki to a Finnish mother and a Russian-born musician father, who spoke Finnish fluently and wanted to raise his son to be Finnish-speaking.

== Show ==
Karpo's show ran for 26 years during which he received a number of death threats. His shows led to 37 trials and zero convictions for him. He has also been asked to run for politics by numerous parties but has continually refused to do so.

Karpo awarded many of his guests with a piece of smoked reindeer or an encased 100 mk (later €100) bill for speaking out. During the early run of the show Karpo also granted financial and material aid to guests on his show but stopped after feeling that his help was being exploited.

Karpo also did not shy away from criticizing Finnish politics and bureaucracy. Indeed, many of his guests were people who felt that they were being mistreated through careless decision making. Others were people in positions or predicaments (either legal or financial) from which they could not seemingly find a way out of.

== Personal life and death ==
Karpo was married to singer Raita Karpo (12 April 1941 - 11 October 2023) and they had two children. Karpo was a major in the military reserve. Karpo had five different residences in Finland: Dalsbruk in the archipelago of Kimitoön, Pakila, Utsjoki, Vihtijärvi, and Klaukkala. Karpo died on 18 March 2025, at the age of 83.

== Karpocature ==
His distinctive appearance as a bearded man, with glasses with a furry hat (karvalakki) and a furry microphone with a frank and demanding voice has become a popular image of a hard-hitting reporter in Finland. Numerous Finnish comedians at various times have "done a Karpo". His famous catchphrase "Onko tässä mitään järkeä!?" ("Does this make any sense (to you)!?") is often a key-part of these caricaturistic impressions.
