= Maailman ympäri =

Finnish quiz show

Maailman ympäri ("Around the world") is a Finnish quiz show shown on YLE TV1 from 2000 to 2004.

The show was hosted by Finnish TV presenter Simo Frangén and had a geography theme. The main prize was a trip around the world (hence the name). The second prize was a luxury weekend trip in a randomly selected European country. Prizes below this level were much cheaper.

Maailman ympäri had four contestants. Usually, two were men and two were women, and likewise two were celebrities and two were ordinary people. (The sex division and the celebrity division only very rarely correlated.)

== Rules ==
Maailman ympäri consisted of four rounds, during each of which one contestant was dropped out.

=== Round one ===
Round one had numerical questions. There were four questions, each one about a different country. The countries were randomly selected with the first being from Europe, the second from America (comprising both North and South America), the third from Africa and the fourth from Asia (also encompassing Australia and Oceania).

Frangén asked a question with a numerical answer (for example "How much...?") about each country in turn, and each contestant made a guess. The contestant whose guess was the closest got half a point. Upon reaching a full point, the contestant moved to round two.

When only one contestant was left in round one, he/she dropped out, and round one was over.

=== Round two ===
Round two was a game of noughts and crosses. All three contestants had a 3-by-3 grid of squares, initially empty. The squares were labelled with different aspects of a country.

Frangén again randomly selected one country from each of the four continents. Each contestant picked one country. (One country was left over.)

In turn, each contestant picked an empty square and Frangén asked him/her a true-or-false question about that particular aspect of his/her chosen country. If the answer was right, the contestant got an X in the square and got to try another question. If the answer was wrong, the contestant got an O in the square and the turn passed on to the next contestant.

Having three Xs in a row got the contestant to round three. Having three Os in a row, or being the last one left, dropped the contestant out of the game.

=== Round three ===
In round three, Frangén also randomly selected one country from each continent, but this time did not reveal their names. The object of round three was to guess the names of the countries.

Frangén went through all four countries in turn, giving both contestants still left five clues about it, starting difficult with five points and then becoming easier and worth less points. Contestants wrote their guesses at each clue down in a list.

After the fifth clue, the country's name was revealed, and both contestants scored for every right guess as many points as the clue's level indicated. After the fourth country, the contestant with more points got to round four.

=== Round four ===
In round four, Frangén also randomly selected one country from each continent. The countries were placed in a stack with Europe lowest and Asia highest.

Round four was timed with a one-minute time limit. Frangén began at the bottom of the stack, asking a multiple-choice question with three choices about the country. A right answer moved up the stack, a wrong answer moved down the stack.

Getting the Africa question right allowed the contestant two possible routes: Continue as normal or try a "one-shot" question. If the contestant chose the one-shot option, the time limit was abandoned, and Frangén asked a multiple-choice question with two choices about the Asian country. Getting the answer wrong dropped the contestant out straight away, instead of moving down the stack.

Getting the Asia question right earned the contestant the main prize of a trip around the world. Getting the "one-shot" question wrong or exceeding the time limit earned him/her a second prize of a week-end trip to a randomly selected European country.

== Jokes and catchphrases ==
Frangén employed a series of running gags in the show. Their form was always the same but the details varied.

Some of the running gags included:

- When introducing the second round, Frangén generally said: "In the second round, we play noughts & crosses. Because everyone knows the rules, I have time left to...", following with a varying activity, which lasted for a minute or so.
- When introducing the third round, Frangén generally said: "In the third round, the question is", followed by a question that had nothing whatsoever to do with the third round, or the entire game show, for that matter. Frangén then looked smug for a second or two, then became all apologetic, saying: "No, sorry! I meant that the question is, what countries are we talking about?"
- Finnish state law requires an official supervisor to be present at the actual draw event of a lottery game. Many shows had these prominently present, but Maailman ympäri was the only show where the interaction between the host and the supervisor went beyond a nominal "Hello" or "Good evening". Frangén proposed some crazy alternative way to handle the draw, which the supervisor refused. Frangén then offered a "compromise", which meant handling the draw as normal. This the supervisor accepted. In the last episode of the show, the supervisor in fact accepted Frangén's unorthodox idea. Frangén then chickened out and refused to put his own idea to action, instead doing the draw the same way he had always done.
- At the end of each episode, Frangén would always finish with these exact words: "Minä olen teidän matkaoppaanne Simo Frangén ja minä en lähde matkalle maailman ympäri. Minä lähden Tampereelle! Moi!" ("I am your travel guide Simo Frangén, and I am not going on a trip around the world. I am going to Tampere! Bye!"). The gag is that Tampere is Frangén's hometown and he is so strongly associated with it that explicitly pointing it out is redundant.

== Lottery game ==
The show was accompanied by a lottery game with the same name in co-operation with Veikkaus. The object of the game, which was entirely a game of chance, was to guess the numbers of the countries chosen on the show.

== Notes ==
Actor Mikko Kivinen sometimes stood in for Simo Frangén when he was on his summer holiday.
