= Bongir, Kohgiluyeh and Boyer-Ahmad =

Bongir بن گير
- Village
- Location within Iran
- Coordinates: 31°15′16″N 50°27′37″E
- Country: Iran
- Province: Kohgiluyeh and Boyer-Ahmad
- County: Kohgiluyeh
- Bakhsh: Dishmok
- Rural District: Bahmayi-ye Sarhadi-ye Sharqi

Population (2006)
  - Total: 134
- Time zone: UTC+3:30 (IRST)
  - Summer (DST): UTC+4:30 (IRDT)

Bongir (Persian: بن گير, also Romanized as Bongīr; also known as Bongarī and Bon Gīrī) is a village in Bahmayi-ye Sarhadi-ye Sharqi Rural District, Dishmok District, Kohgiluyeh County, Kohgiluyeh and Boyer-Ahmad Province, Iran. At the 2006 census, its population was 134, in 25 families.
