= Pasi Heikura =

Finnish actor and presenter

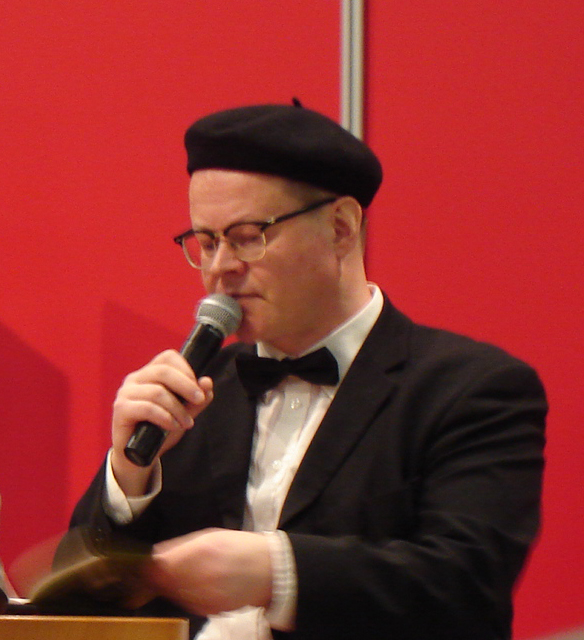
Pasi Heikura

Pasi Eino Heikura (born 14 April 1963 in Karvia, Satakunta) is a Finnish humorist, musician, writer, television actor and presenter best known for his work on Alivaltiosihteeri.

Heikura hosts the radio program Aristoteleen kantapää (Aristotle's Heel) on Yle Radio 1 which focuses on common usage of the Finnish language. In addition to discussion with a guest about a different topic each week, proscribed use of phrases and quote tips are also presented.
