= Yamandu Costa =

Brazilian guitarist and composer

- Born: Yamandu Costa; 24 January 1980 (age 46); Passo Fundo, Rio Grande do Sul, Brazil
- Genres: Música popular brasileira, choro, bossa nova, milonga, jazz, tango, samba, chamamé, Brazilian folk, instrumental, Baião
- Occupations: Guitarist, composer
- Instrument: Violão de sete cordas (Brazilian seven-string classical guitar)
- Years active: 1990s–present
- Spouse: Elodie Bouny (m. 2007–2023)
- Children: 2
- Parent(s): Algacir Costa and Clary Marcon
- Website: www.yamandu.com.br

Yamandu Costa (born January 24, 1980, in Passo Fundo), sometimes spelled Yamandú, is a Brazilian guitarist and composer. His main instrument is the violão de sete cordas, the Brazilian seven-string classical guitar.

Costa began to study guitar at age seven with his father, Algacir Costa, leader of the group Os Fronteiriços (The Frontiersmen), and mastered the instrument under the guidance of Lúcio Yanel, an Argentine virtuoso, who lived in Brazil. At age fifteen, Costa began to study southern Brazilian folk music, as well as the music of Argentina and Uruguay.

Influenced by the music of Radamés Gnattali, he began to study the music of other Brazilians, such as Baden Powell de Aquino, Tom Jobim and Raphael Rabello.

At age seventeen he played in São Paulo for the first time at the Cultural Circuit Bank of Brazil; the concert was produced by Study Tone Brazil.

Yamandu Costa gained increased international recognition after he appeared in Mika Kaurismäki's 2005 documentary film Brasileirinho. The film showcased the vibrant world of Brazilian choro music and featured Costa’s impressive guitar skills, which helped him reach a broader audience. While he was already an established musician in Brazil, the documentary played a significant role in elevating his profile internationally.

Costa's diverse styles include choro, bossa nova, milonga, tango, samba and chamamé.

His 2019 album Vento Sul was considered one of the 25 best Brazilian albums of the second half of 2019 by the São Paulo Association of Art Critics.

In 2021, his album Toquinho e Yamandu Costa - Bachianinha (Live at Rio Montreux Jazz Festival) (with Toquinho) won the Latin Grammy Award for Best Instrumental Album.

== Awards ==
List of awards won by Yamandu Costa:

- Prêmio Tim - Best Soloist - 2004
- Winner of the Prêmio Visa, Instrumental edition - 2001
- Trophy of Instrumental Music Revelation of the Rio Grande do Sul state
- 25º Award of Best Instrumentalist of the Rio Grande do Sul state
- Winner of the Prêmio Califórnia of Uruguaiana - 1995

== Discography ==
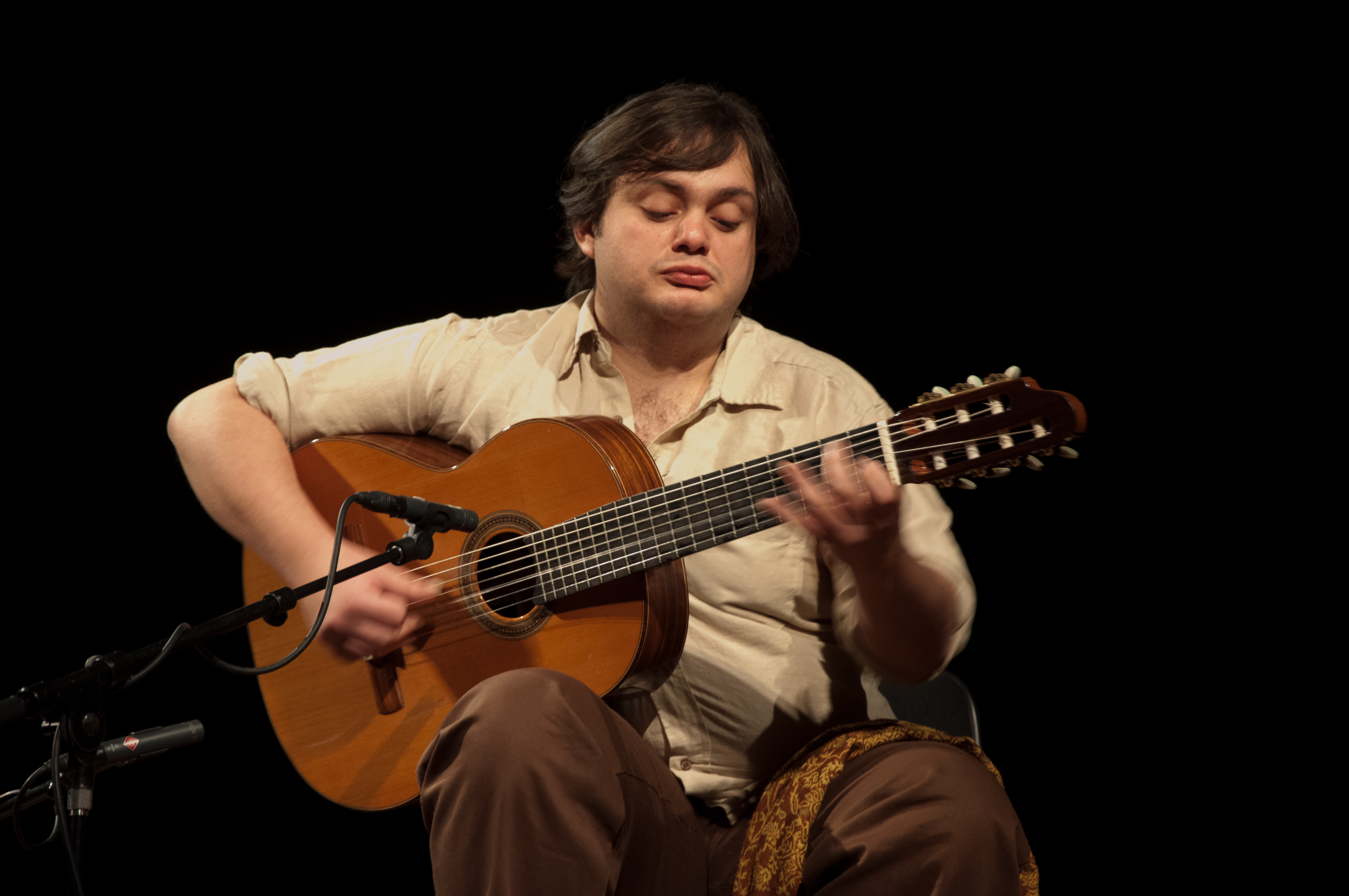
Yamandu Costa in 2009. Photo André SZEP

- 2026 - Estrada Longa (with Antoine Boyer)
- 2026 - Em Casa (with Calry Costa)
- 2026 - El Arranque (with Hermanos Guedes)
- 2026 - Guitarras Pal Sur (with Facundo Rodriguez)
- 2026 - La Quinta Esencia (with Alexis Cardenas & Ensemble Recoveco)
- 2025 - Saga (with Martín Sued)
- 2024 - Ida & Volta
- 2024 - Innes Spirits (with Jan Lundgreen)
- 2024 - Uno a Uno (with Francesco Buzzurro)
- 2024 - Prenda Minha (with António Zambujo)
- 2024 - Helping Hands (with Elodie Bouny)
- 2023 - Encontro das Águas (with Armadinho Macedo)
- 2023 - YouTube Sessions
- 2023 - De Vida y Vuelta (with Domingo el Colorao)
- 2022 - Jazz Cigano Quinteto e Yamandu Costa
- 2022 - Simpatia (with Bebê Kramer)
- 2021 - Caballeros (with Guto Wirtti)
- 2021 - Encontro de Gerações na Música Instrumental Brasileira (live)
- 2021 - Caminantes (with Martin Sued and Luis Guerreiro)
- 2021 - Bachianinha - Live at Rio Montreux Jazz Festival (with Toquinho)
- 2020 - Festejo (with Marcelo Jiran)
- 2020 – Nashville 1996
- 2019 - Vento Sul
- 2018 – Yamandu Costa e Ricardo Herz
- 2017 – Borghetti Yamandu
- 2017 – Recanto
- 2017 – Quebranto (with Alessandro Penezzi)
- 2015 – Lado B (with Dominguinhos)
- 2015 – Tocata à Amizade
- 2015 – Concerto de Fronteira (with Orquestra do Estado de Mato Grosso)
- 2013 – Continente
- 2011 – Yamandu Costa e Rogério Caetano
- 2008 – Mafuá
- 2007 – Lida
- 2007 – Yamandu + Dominguinhos
- 2007 – Ida e Volta
- 2006 – Tokyo Session
- 2005 – Música do Brasil Vol.I (DVD)
- 2005 – Yamandu Costa ao Vivo (DVD)
- 2005 – Brasileirinho
- 2004 – El Negro Del Blanco (with Paulo Moura)
- 2003 – Yamandu ao Vivo
- 2001 – Yamandu / Prêmio Visa
- 2000 – Dois Tempos (with Lúcio Yanel)
