= Brasileirinho (disambiguation) =

"Brasileirinho" is a 1947 Brazilian choro composed by Valdir Azevedo.

Brasileirinho may also refer to:

- Brasileirinho (film), 2005 documentary directed by Mika Kaurismäki
- 15453 Brasileirinhos, minor planet
- Brasileirinho (crustacean), a genus of cave isopods
