= Pirkko Hämäläinen (actress) =

Finnish actress (born 1959)

- Born: 29 May 1959 (age 67); Helsinki, Finland
- Occupation: Actress
- Years active: 1981–present

Pirkko Päivikki Hämäläinen (born 29 May 1959) is a Finnish actress. She has worked in theatres, films and on television. Frequently collaborating with director Mika Kaurismäki, she won the Best Actress Jussi Award for her role in Kaurismäki's 1989 film Paperitähti.

== Personal life ==
Hämäläinen was in a relationship with actor Puntti Valtonen for 17 years. They have two sons together. In 2010, she announced in an interview that her current partner was author Kirsti Simonsuuri. They remained together until Simonsuuri's death from cancer in 2019.

== Selected filmography ==
- The Liar (1981)
- The Worthless (1982)
- The Winter War (1989)
- Paperitähti (1989)
- Amazon (1990)
- Three Wise Men (2008)
- Jingle Bells (2022)
