= Latin Grammy Award for Best Instrumental Album =

Latin Grammy Award category

- Awarded for: quality albums of latin instrumental music
- Country: United States
- Presented by: The Latin Recording Academy
- First award: 2001
- Currently held by: Rafael Serrallet & Lviv National Philharmonic for Y el Canto de Todas (2025)
- Website: latingrammy.com

The Latin Grammy Award for Best Instrumental Album is an honor presented annually at the Latin Grammy Awards, a ceremony that recognizes excellence and creates a wider awareness of cultural diversity and contributions of Latin recording artists in the United States and internationally. The award goes to solo artists, duos or groups, producer(s), recording engineer(s) and mixing engineer(s) of 51% or more of the total playing time of the album.

The award was first presented in 2001 in the pop field under the name of Best Pop Instrumental Album when it was handed out to Nestor Torres for the album This Side Of Paradise. However it wasn't until the Latin Grammy Awards of 2004 when the instrumental field was created and the award received its current denomination Best Instrumental Album which was awarded to Yo-Yo Ma for Obrigado Brazil.

Chick Corea is the biggest winner in this category with two awards. Furthermore, musicians from the United States have received this award on four occasions. The rest of the winners come from Argentina, Cuba, Colombia and Puerto Rico. In 2013, the album Presente by Bajofondo became the first instrumental album to be nominated for Album of the Year.

== History ==
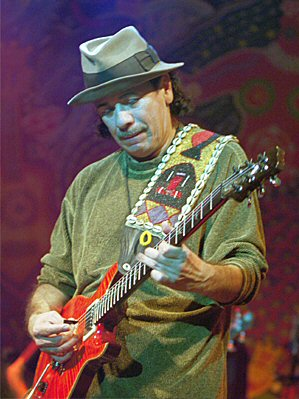
Mexican guitarist Carlos Santana won the peer category Best Pop Instrumental Performance for this award in 2000.

At the first Latin Grammy Awards ceremony a category intended for instrumental recordings was presented in the pop field under the name of Best Pop Instrumental Performance for singles and tracks only. The winner was Mexican guitarist Santana for the song "El Farol", which also happened to win the Grammy Award for Best Pop Instrumental Performance that same year, who competed against; Raul di Blasio for "El Despertar Escandalo", Ivan Lins for "Dois Córregos", Frankie Marcos featuring Arturo Sandoval for "Oh Havana, When I Think Of You" and Nestor Torres for "Luna Latina". The following year a category was created under the name of Best Pop Instrumental Album now intended for full albums. In 2004 the category was renamed Best Instrumental Album and moved to the newly created instrumental field which now includes all forms of Latin instrumental music.

== Recipients ==
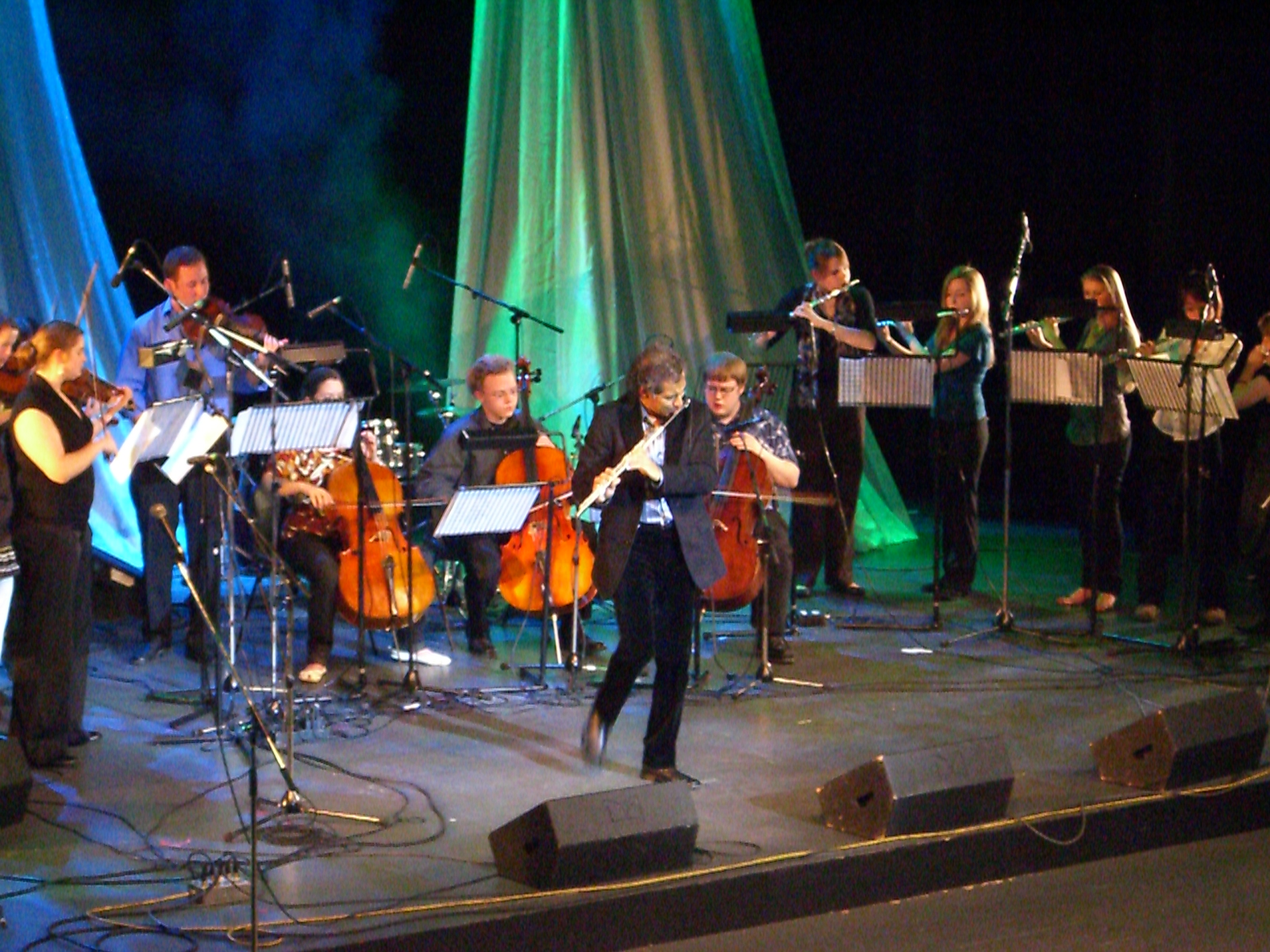
Jazz flautist Néstor Torres was the first winner of the award under the name Best Pop Instrumental Album.

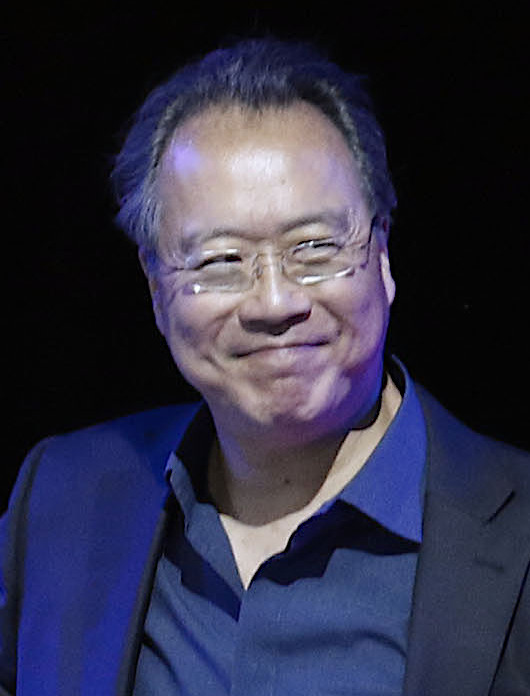
Yo-Yo Ma, 2004 winner, the first recipient of this award under its current denomination.

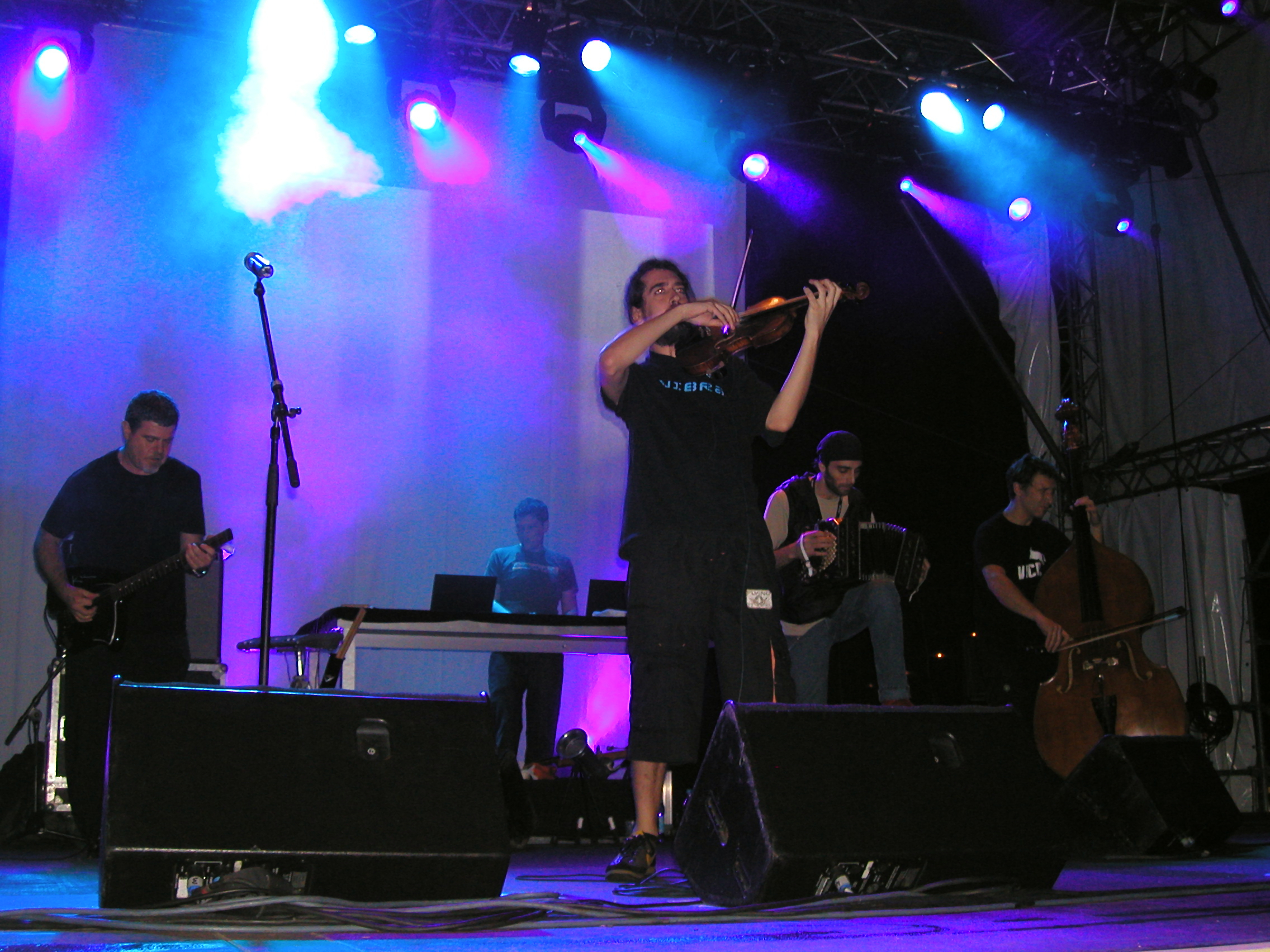
Two-time winners Bajofondo.

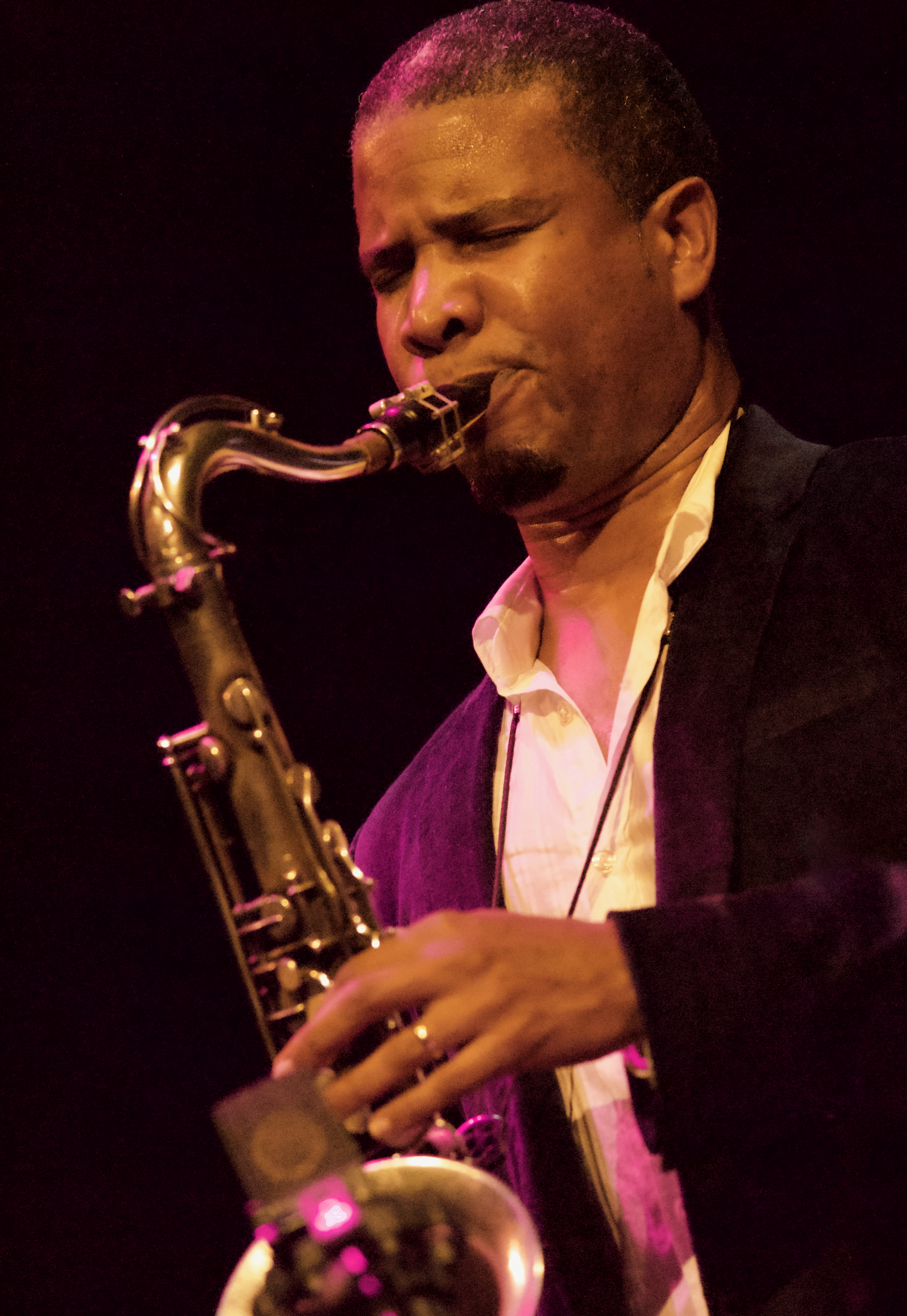
Puerto Rican saxophonist David Sánchez won the award in 2005.

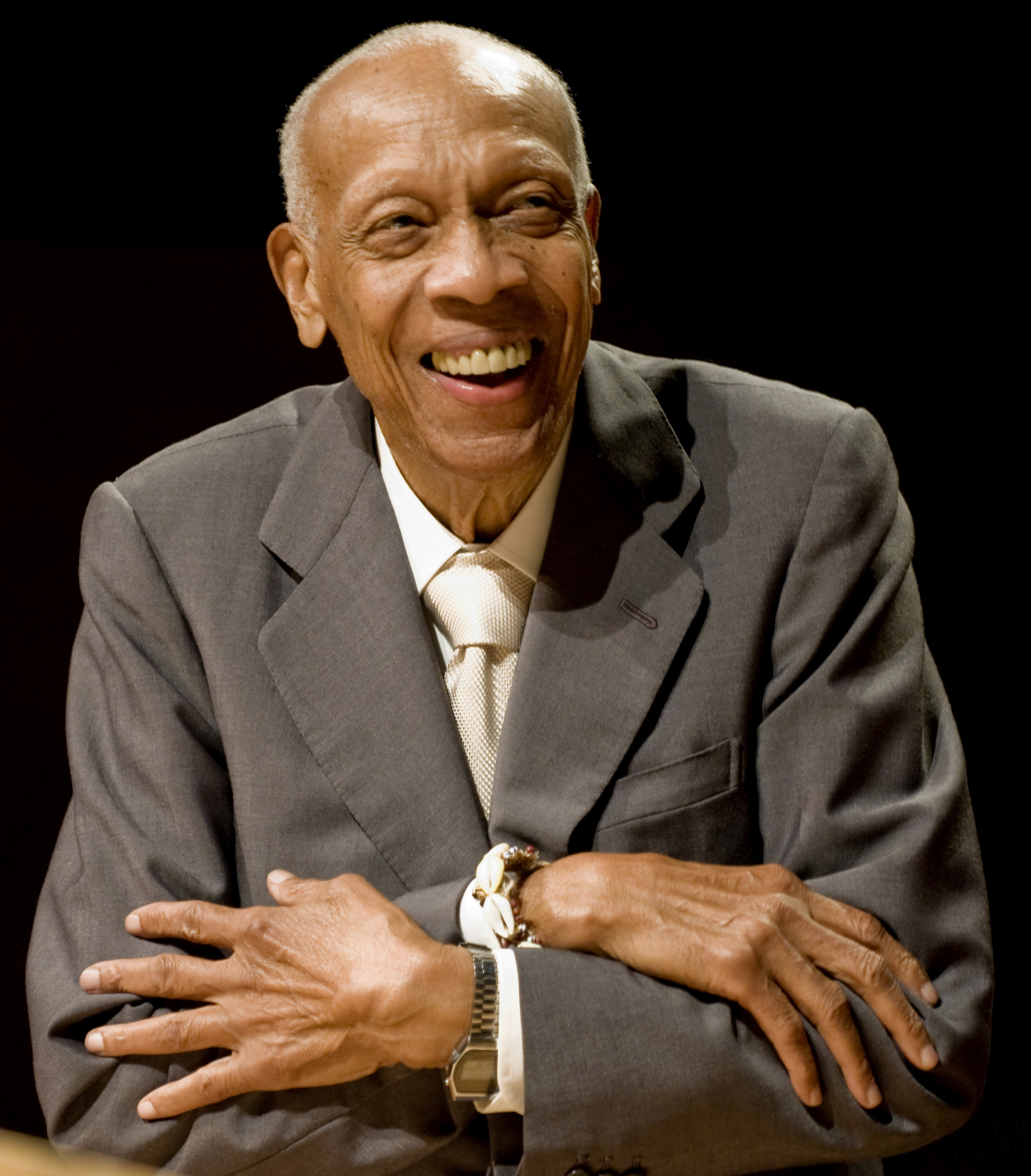
Bebo Valdés winner in 2006.

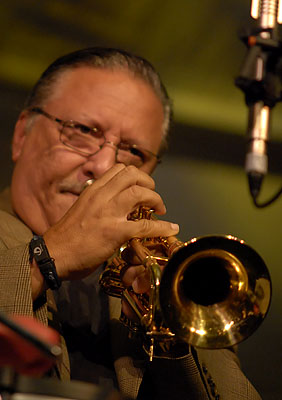
2010 winner Arturo Sandoval.

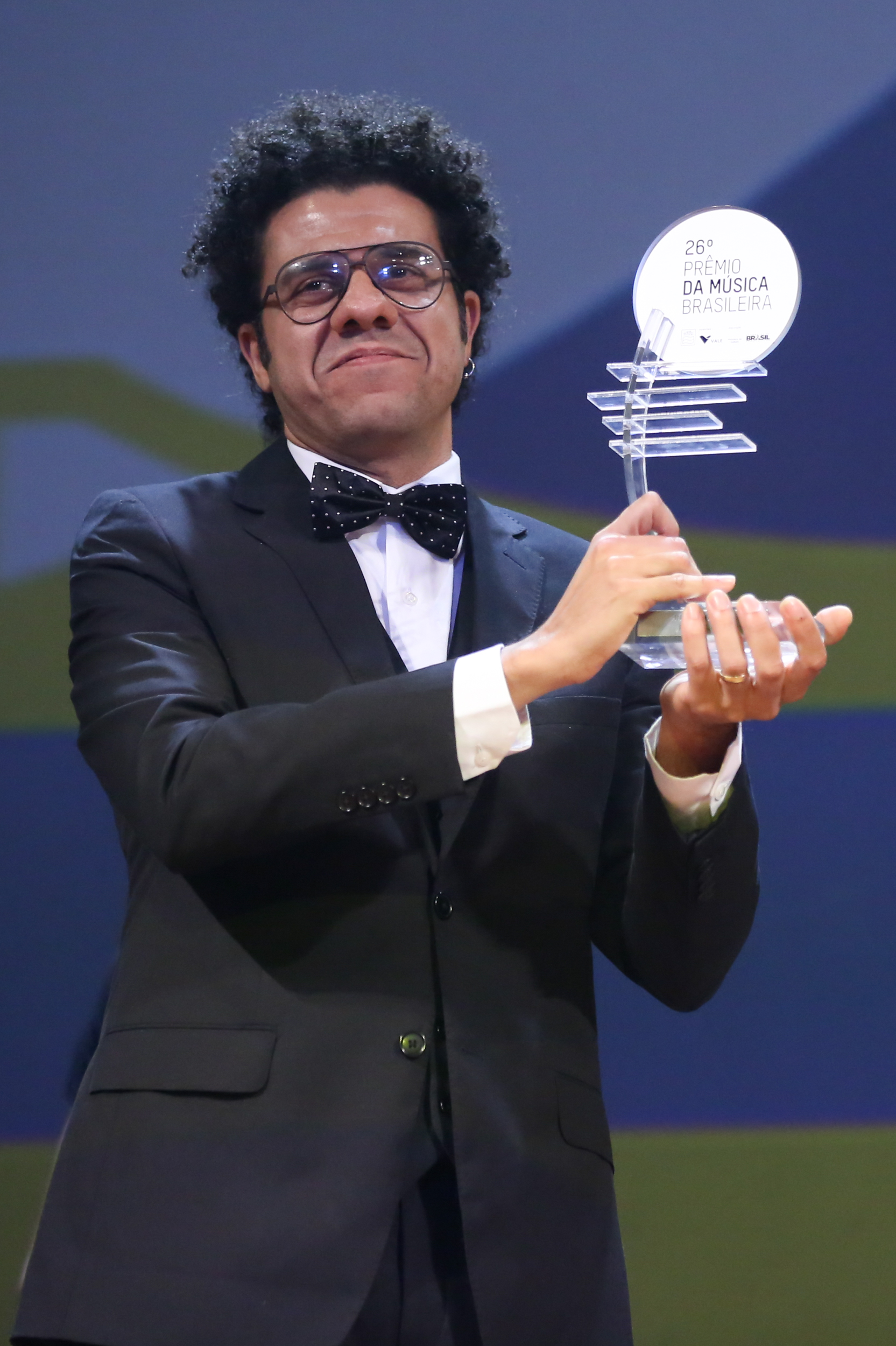
Three-time winner Hamilton de Holanda.

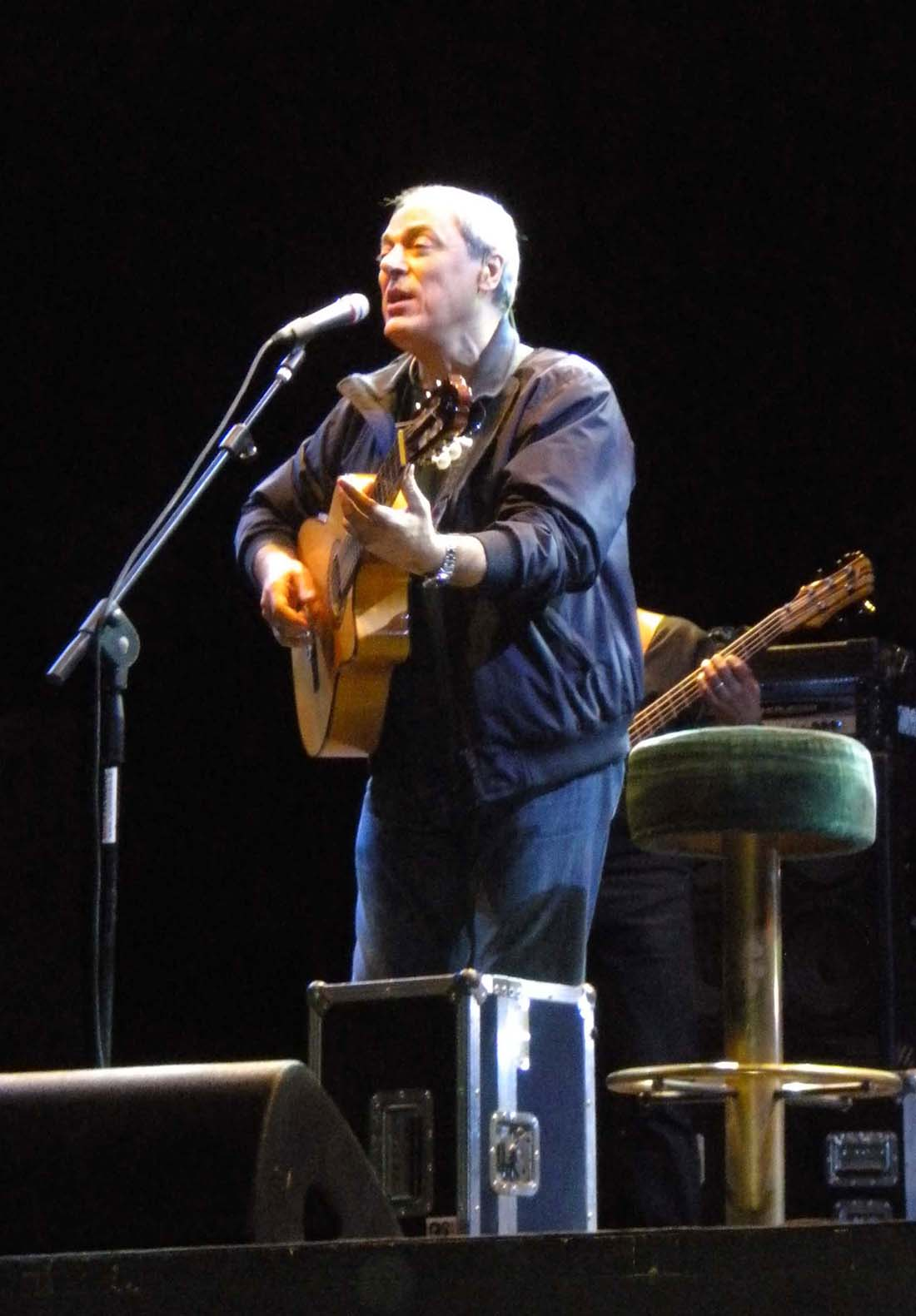

Year^{[I]}	Performing artist(s)	Work	Nominees	Ref.
2001	(Puerto Rico) Nestor Torres	This Side Of Paradise	Andrés Alén – Pianoforte; Lara & Reyes – World Jazz; Keith Lockhart conducting The Boston Pops Orchestra – The Latin Album; Marcus Viana – Terra	
2002	(Cuba) Chucho Valdés	Canciones Inéditas	Gustavo Cerati – + Bien; Rey Guerra – De Sindo A Silvio; José Padilla – Navigator; Roberto Perera – Sensual	
2003	(Argentina) Bajofondo Tango Club: Juan Campodónico & Gustavo Santaolalla, producers	Bajofondo Tango Club	Tango di Blasio – Gardel; Orquestra Simfònica de Barcelona I Nacional de Catalunya; Juan José García Caffi (director) – Historia Sinfonica del Pop Español; Spam Allstars – ¡Fuacata! Live; Nestor Torres – Mi Alma Latina	
2004	(United States) Yo-Yo Ma	Obrigado Brazil Live in Concert	Armandinho – Retocando O Choro; Paulo Moura – Estação Leopoldina; Ricardo Silveira – Noite Clara; Tanghetto – Emigrante (Electrotango)	
2005	(Puerto Rico) David Sánchez	Coral	Manuel Alejandro – Nuevos Caminos; Ed Calle – Ed Calle Plays Santana; Pedro Guzman – Ti ple Jazz; Gonzalo Rubalcaba & New Cuban Quartet – Paseo	
2006	(Cuba) Bebo Valdés	Bebo	Banda Mantiqueira – Terra Amantiquira; Paquito D'Rivera – The Jazz Chamber Trio; Luis Salinas – Luis Salinas Y Amigos En España; Mario Adnet & Zé Nogueira – Moacir Santos: Choros y Alegría	
2007	(United States) Chick Corea & Béla Fleck	The Enchantment	Ray Barretto – Standards Rican-ditioned; Ed Calle – In The Zone; Carlos Franzetti Trio – Live In Buenos Aires; Hamilton de Holanda Quintet – Brasilianos	
2008	(Colombia) Orquesta Filarmónica de Bogotá	Orquesta Filarmónica de Bogotá – 40 Años	Kenny G – Rhythm & Romance; Paulo Moura – Pra Cá E Para Lá; Gonzalo Rubalcaba – Avatar; Bebo Valdés & Javier Colina – Live at the Village Vanguard	
2009	(Argentina) Carlos Franzetti & (Puerto Rico) Eddie Gómez	Duets	Jovino Santos Neto & Weber Lago – Live At Caramoor; Mauro Senise – Lua Cheia Mauro Senise Toca Dolores Duran E Sueli Costa; Omar Sosa – Across The Divide; Bernie Williams – Moving Forward	
2010	(United States) Arturo Sandoval	A Time for Love	Yamandu Costa & Hamilton de Holanda – Luz Da Aurora; Arthur Maia – O Tempo E a Musica; Paulo Moura & Armandinho – Afrobossanova; Soto 75 – Latin American Chillout	
2011	(United States) Chick Corea, Stanley Clarke & Lenny White	Forever	Al Di Meola – Pursuit of Radical Rhapsody; Escalandrum – Piazzolla Plays Piazzolla; Luis Salinas – Sin Tiempo; Omar Sosa – Calma	
2012	(United States) Chick Corea, Paul Motian & (Puerto Rico) Eddie Gómez	Further Explorations	Paquito D'Rivera & Berta Rojas – Día y Medio; Guinga + Quinteto Villa-Lobos – Rasgando Seda; Hamilton de Holanda – Brasilianos 3; Miguel Zenón – Alma Adentro: The Puerto Rican Songbook	
2013	(Argentina) (Uruguay) Bajofondo	Presente	Huáscar Barradas & Leopoldo Betancourt – Dos Mundos 2; Hamilton de Holanda – Trio; Paquito D'Rivera & Sérgio Assad & Odair Assad – Dances From The New World; Theodore Kuchar conducting The Orquesta Sinfónica de Venezuela – Latin American Classics	
2014	(Mexico) Arturo O'Farrill and the Chico O'Farrill Afro-Cuban Jazz Orchestra	Final Night at Birdland	Antonio Adolfo – O Piano de Antonio Adolfo; Yamandu Costa – Continente; Hamilton de Holanda – Caprichos; Mónica Fuquen – Esferas de Creación	
2015	(Venezuela) Ed Calle & Mamblue	Dr. Ed Calle Presents Mamblue	Antonio Adolfo – Tema; Chick Corea Trio – Triology; Kenny G – Brazilian Nights; Gustavo Santaolalla – Camino	
2016	(Brazil) Hamilton de Holanda	Samba de Chico	Víctor Biglione – Mercosul; João Donato – Donato Elétrico; Carlos Franzetti – Argentum; Bruno Miranda – Mosaico	
2017	(Dominican Republic) Michel Camilo & (Spain) Tomatito	Spain Forever	Cesar Camargo Mariano featuring Rudiger Liebermann, Walter Seyfarth & Benoit Fromanger – Joined; Gustavo Casenave – Conversations with Vladimir Stowe; Daniel Minimalia – Origen; Luis Salinas – El Tren	
2018	(Venezuela) Miguel Siso	Identidad	Yamandu Costa – Recanto; Hamilton de Holanda Trio – Hamilton de Holanda Trio – Jacob 10zz; Airto Moreira – Aluê; Hermeto Pascoal & Grupo – No Mundo dos Sons	
2019	(Uruguay) Gustavo Casenave	Balance	Cuban Sax Quintet – Saxofones Live Sessions; Edu Ribeiro, Fábio Peron & Toninho Ferragutti – Folia De Treis; Moisés P. Sánchez – Unbalanced Concerto For Ensemble; Miguel Zenón featuring Spektral Quartet – Yo Soy La Tradición	
2020	(Spain) Daniel Minimalia	Terra	Leo Amuedo – Plays Daniel Figueiredo; Caetano Brasil – Cartografías; Compasses – Sotavento; Yamandu Costa featuring Marcelo Jiran – Festejo	
2021	(Brazil) Toquinho & Yamandu Costa	Toquinho e Yamandu Costa - Bachianinha (Live at Rio Montreaux Jazz Festival)	Omar Acosta & Sergio Menem – Entretiempo y Tiempo; Cristovão Bastos & Rogério Caetano – Cristovão Bastos e Rogério Caetano; Hamilton de Holanda & Mestrinho – Canto Da Praya - Ao Vivo; Ara Malikian – Le Petit Garage (Live)	
2022	(Brazil) Hamilton de Holanda	Maxixe Samba Groove	C4 Trío – Back to 4; Gerry Weil & Orquesta Sinfónica Simón Bolívar – Gerry Weil Sinfónico; Grupo Raíces de Venezuela – Ofrenda; Daniela Padrón & Glenda del E – Ella	
2023	(Cuba) Camilo Valencia & Richard Bravo	Made in Miami	Renesito Avich – Tres; Cristovão Bastos & Mauro Senise – Choro Negro; Jorge Glem & Sam Reider – Brooklyn-Cumana; ADDA Simfònica, Josep Vicent & Emilio Solla – The Chick Corea Symphony Tribute. Ritmo; Miguel Zenón, José A. Zayas Cabán, Ryan Smith & Casey Rafn – Romance al Campesino Porteño	
2024	(Brazil) Hamilton de Holanda & (Venezuela) C4 Trio	Tembla	Omar Acosta – Impronta; Carlomagno Araya, Jose Valentino & The Latin Music Ensemble – Claude Bolling Goes Latin – Suite for Flute and Latin Music Ensemble; Alexis Cárdenas – Capriccio Latino; Yamandu Costa & Armandinho Macêdo – Encontro Das Águas	
2025	(Spain) Rafael Serrallet & (Ukraine) Lviv National Philharmonic	Y el Canto de Todas	Ariel Brínguez & Iván "Melon" Lewis – Alma en Cuba; Yamandu Costa, Martín Sued e Orquestra Assintomática – Saga; Yamandu Costa – Ida e Volta; Harlem Quartet featuring Aldo López Gavilán – Havana Meets Harlem	

^{^[I]} Each year is linked to the article about the Latin Grammy Awards held that year.
