= Julio Bagué =

Puerto Rican musical artist (born 1968)

- Born: January 17, 1968 (age 58); San Juan, Puerto Rico
- Occupations: Vice president – peermusic Latin division East Coast and Puerto Rico; music producer; arranger
- Years active: 1993–present
- Notable work: Latin Grammy Award winner; multiple Latin Grammy nominee
- Musical career
- Genres: Latin; jazz; classical; world
- Labels: Alcione; Peer Southern Productions

Julio Bagué (born January 17, 1968, in San Juan, Puerto Rico) is a producer, arranger and music executive. Bagué has received multiple Latin Grammy Award nominations, and won a Latin Grammy Award for Best Traditional Tropical Album for his work with Jon Secada featuring The Charlie Sepúlveda Big Band on the recording To Beny Moré with Love. Bagué is also known for signing, developing and promoting Latin music artists internationally in his capacity as a vice president of US Latin East Coast and Puerto Rico for peermusic. Bagué has been with this independent, multi-national music publishing firm for nearly two decades.

== Early life ==
Bagué began his music career at the age of seven, perfecting his violin playing and making early attempts at composing. He was later mentored by maestro Carlos Varela, a graduate from the Juilliard School of Music who worked as an arranger/orchestrator in the jazz, Latin and classical fields with artists such as Louie Armstrong, Count Basie and Arturo Toscanini. Bagué graduated with a master's degree in Music from the University of Miami in 1993.

== Career ==
=== 1990s: Music industry beginnings ===
His career as a producer and composer began with film scores for award-winning director Brendan Fraser, as well as various jingles and spots for such clients as Radio Disney and Bacardi. By 1993, Bagué had been songwriting and arranging with Miami-based jazz musician, Laura Bradley, and collaborating with Néstor Torres, Exposé and Tito Puente.

He later went on to compose music for theater and ballet, receiving excellent reviews in venues including Coconut Grove Playhouse, The Colony Theater and Juegos del Arte Dance Ensemble. With music culled from these works, Bagué creating two albums as a recording artist (Origin and Caribbean Dream) on the Alcione Music label. Origin received great acceptance in France, as the title track was used as the official song celebrating the eclipse of 1999. The song "Ceiba" from Caribbean Dream was the theme song for the television series "En Ruta Por..." in Puerto Rico, and was also utilized as the promotional campaign spot for the island's "Jardin Botanico de Caguas" botanical garden.

From 1996-1999, Bague worked with internationally renowned composer/producer Alejandro Jaen as arranger, songwriter and producer. His first foray into music publishing was assisting Jaen as a song plugger when he created the Ventura Music publishing company. During this time with Jaen, he worked on artist projects such as Menudo/MDO, Ommar Hernandez, and Flamenco icon Peret.

=== 2022-2017: Peermusic and Music Production ===
External image
- Julio Bagué arrives for the 2017 Latin Recording Academy Person of the Year Gala
- View image here

This 2022 Julio Bagué is recording the music for the film about the life of Joe Arroyo ¨Rebelión¨ and he has produced the album ¨Ella¨ with Daniela Padrón and Glenda del E released by Oleta Music, this album is a tribute to the latin american writers.

In 2021 Bagué found the independent record label Oleta Music, which first álbum to release ¨Solos¨ with Jon Secada and Gonzalo Rubalcaba was nominated for a Latin Grammy and it was produced by Bagué.

In 2000, Bagué was named Creative Manager for peermusic, the largest privately owned music publisher in the world. In 2003, Bagué was promoted to newly created position of East Coast Creative Director of peermusic's U.S. Latin division, and assigned to handle creative affairs for Puerto Rico. As Creative Director, his skills led him to develop talent such as the duo "Bacha,” composed of members Jorge Luis Chacin and Juliana Barrios. Bagué produced and arranged their self-titled album which was nominated for a Latin Grammy Award in 2005. In 2006, Bagué served on the judging panel for peermusic's third annual Latin Scholarship for original Latin songs and instrumental compositions, which was awarded to Berklee College of Music student, Marco A. Godoy.

Bagué took over operations for peermusic's Miami office in 2009. During this period, the company acquired the PMC and Ventura Music catalogs and signed Sony recording artists Víctor Manuelle and Chayanne to worldwide music publishing agreements. Bagué produced and signed to the US Latin Grammy nominated artists ChocQuibTown, and Tropical recording artists, Melina León and Carolina la O. Bagué was named peermusic's Executive Director - Miami and Puerto Rico in 2012. He produced Cofresí, the operetta by composer Rafael Hernández that immortalizes the renowned Puerto Rican pirate, Roberto Cofresí. The album was released in 2013 after an extensive two year reconstruction of a Latin music masterpiece thought to be lost, and was nominated for a Latin Grammy that year in the Best Classical Album category. Additionally, the recording was awarded a cultural patronage of Puerto Rico by UNESCO.

External image
- Julio Bagué pictured with salsa artist Edwin Bonilla and BMI's Delia Orjuela in 2013.
- View image here

In 2014, Bagué was promoted to Vice President of peermusic's Latin Division, for the East Coast and Puerto Rico. Three years later, Bagué won a Latin Grammy Award for his work as producer of the album To Beny Moré with Love, a tribute by Jon Secada featuring the Charlie Sepúlveda Big Band to the legendary Cuban singer and bandleader, Beny Moré.

During his career, Bagué has been responsible for signing top artist/songwriters, including Grammy Award-winning artist Gilberto Santa Rosa. He also added his personal touch as a producer/arranger on projects including Salsa superstar Carolina La O; Puerto Rican Merengue diva, Melina León; Latin Jazz trumpet virtuoso Charlie Sepúlveda and Reggaeton/Urban artist, Naldo. Bagué currently serves on the advisory boards for Musicians on Call, The Latin Songwriters Hall of Fame and St. Martha-Yamaha Concert Series.

== Awards and honors ==
In 2019, Julio Bagué win the Latin Grammy for Best Tropical album with ¨Tiempo Al Tiempo¨ from Luis Enrique and C4 Trio for his work as producer and the Grammy nomination in 2020 for this album, also is named by the Billboard magazine as Latin Power Player.

In 2017, Bagué won a Latin Grammy Award in the category of Best Traditional Tropical Album for his work as a producer on the album To Beny Moré with Love. A homage piece to the late great Cuban bandleader singer-songwriter Beny Moré, it was interpreted by Grammy award winner Jon Secada, featuring the Charlie Sepúlveda Big Band.

As album producer for Cofresí: Rafael Hernández, Bagué received a Latin Grammy nomination for Best Classical Album in 2013.

Bagué received three 2012 Latin Grammy nominations for his work with Colombian recording artists, ChocQuibTown. Bagué produced Eso Es Lo Que Hay, which was nominated for Album of the Year and Best Alternative Music Album, including the song "Calentura," nominated for Record Of The Year.

Bagué produced and arranged the self-titled album for the duo of Jorge Luis Chacín and Juliana Barrios, known as "Bachá." The album was nominated for a Latin Grammy for Best Contemporary Tropical Album in 2005.

== Other ventures ==
=== Philanthropy and Community ===
Julio Bagué is a board member of nonprofit organization, The Miami Foundation for a Greater Miami. Established in 1967, the Foundation manages $360 million in donor assets and has awarded almost $300 million in grants towards programs designed to enhance the quality of life in Miami. Additionally, Bagué currently serves on the advisory board for Musicians on Call and on the board of governors for St. Martha-Yamaha Concert Series. He is Board Member of the Recording Academy for the Florida Chapter and Chairman in the Advocacy Comite and also He is part of the Latin Hall Of Fame comite.

=== Public speaking ===
In June 2014, Bagué was the feature guest speaker at Full Sail University in Winter Park, Florida, where he spoke about his career in the music industry and the state of Latin music at that time. Bagué has also spoken at several Music Business and Songwriting panels for the Frost School of Music at the University of Miami campus and was a guest Songwriting panelist at Miami Dade Community College.

== Discography ==
Selected List of Credits

Year	Artist	Title	Label	Role
2018	Manu Manzo	Intermedio	Peer Southern Productions	Producer, Executive Producer, Arranger
2018	Marger	Sola	Sony Music Latin	Producer
2018	Marger	Baby, Baby	Sony Music Latin	Producer
2018	Charlie Sepúlveda Big Band & The Turnaround	Songs for Nat	High Note Records	Producer
2018	Jorge Luis Chacín	Contento	DNR Music, Inc.	Producer, Arranger
2017	Nestor Torres	Del Caribe, Soy! Latin American Flute Music	Naxos	Producer, Executive Producer
2017	Jon Secada featuring Charlie Sepúlveda & The Turnaround	To Beny Moré with Love	Peer Southern Productions, BMG Soundstage	Producer, Executive Producer
2017	Charlie Sepúlveda Big Band & The Turnaround	Mr. EP: A Tribute to Eddie Palmieri	Highnote Records	Producer
2017	Various performers	The Roots of Popular Music: The Ralph S. Peer Story	Sony Music	Producer
2017	Kerreke	Kerreke	Kerreke Music	Producer, Executive Producer, Arranger
2017	MDO	MDO	Sony International	Arranger, Engineer
2013	Various performers	The Golden Age of Cuba: La Era Dorada	Sony Music	Compilation Producer, Liner Notes
2013	Rafael Dávila, Elaine Ortíz-Arándes, Roselín Pabón & The Puerto Rico Symphony Orchestra	Rafael Hernández's operetta, Cofresí	Peer Southern Productions	Producer, Executive Producer
2012	Tito Puente	Quatro: The Definitive Collection	Sony Music	Liner Notes, Quotation Author
2011	ChocQuibTown	Eso Es Lo Que Hay	Peer Southern Productions, Sony Music	Producer, Executive Producer
2010	Melina León	Dos Caras	Peer Southern Productions	Producer, Executive Producer, Arranger
2010	Carolina La O	En Vivo	Peer Southern Productions	Producer, Executive Producer
2009	Carolina La O y Los Gemelos	Reencuentro Con los Gemelos	Peer Southern Productions	Producer, Executive Producer
2007	Melina León	Vas a Pagar y Sus Exitos	Sony Music Distribution	Executive Producer
2004	Bachá	Bachá	Sony Music Distribution	Producer, Arranger
2001	Bagué	Caribbean Dream	Alcione Music	Recording Artist, Producer
1999	Bagué	Origin	Alcione Music	Recording Artist

External videos
- Julio Bagué appears in the documentary "To Beny Moré with Love, Jon Secada!" here

== Filmography ==
Year	Film	Roles	Notes
2018	Sin Filtro con Luis Miguel	Self Contributor	Telemundo biopic
2017	To Beny Moré with Love, Jon Secada!	Producer, Self	Documentary directed by Peter M. Robles

== See also ==
- 18th Annual Latin Grammy Awards - Best Traditional Tropical Album (won)
- 14th Annual Latin Grammy Awards - Best Classical Album (nomination)
- 13th Annual Latin Grammy Awards - Record of the Year, Album of the Year, Best Alternative Music Album (nominations)
- 6th Annual Latin Grammy Awards - Best Contemporary Tropical Album (nomination)
