= Glenda del E =

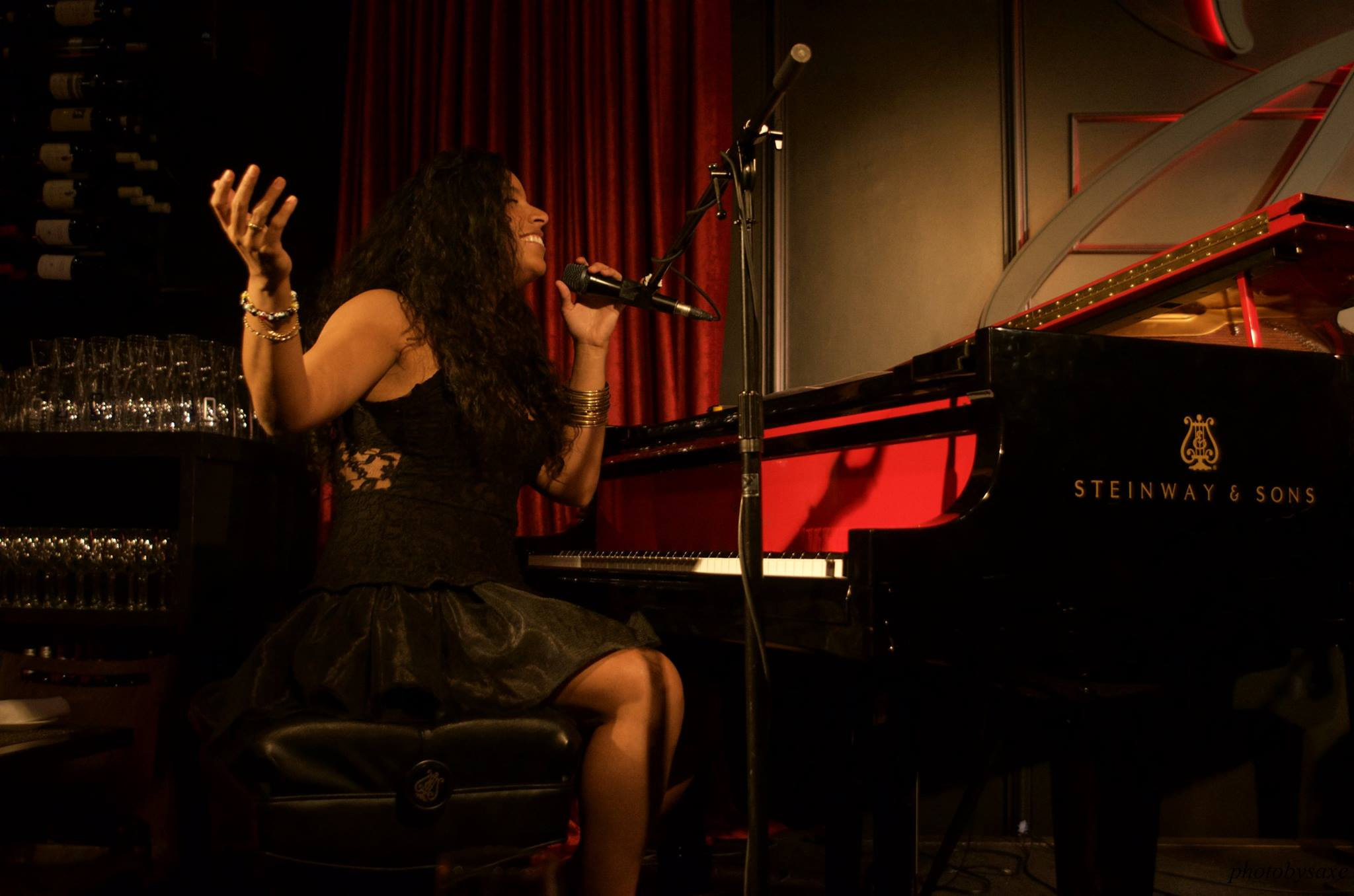

Background information
- Born: Glenda del Monte Escalante; Havana, Cuba
- Genres: Jazz, instrumental, world music, soul, classical
- Occupations: Pianist, songwriter
- Instruments: Voice, piano
- Label: Independent

Glenda del Monte Escalante, known professionally as Glenda del E, is a Cuban-Canadian pianist, singer, record producer, arranger and composer, nominated for a Latin Grammy Award in 2022 for her album Ella, in collaboration with Venezuelan violinist Daniela Padrón.

Born and raised in Havana, she became interested in music since childhood due to the influence of her parents. She received musical training on the island and later moved with her family to Canada to study at the Royal Conservatory of Music in Toronto. After joining the canadian pop band The Parachute Club in the late 2000s, in the 2010s she formed the group Glenda del E & Q-ban Mixology, with which she recorded an album of the same name in 2010.

During this period, she collaborated with artists like Paquito D'Rivera, Fernando Osorio, and Oriente López, and in 2015 she was invited by Alejandro Sanz to be part of his Sirope tour. Since then, she has accompanied the Spanish singer as a pianist in his live performances and in some studio recordings. In November 2020, she joined the band of Venezuelan singer José Luis Rodríguez during a streaming presentation.

After being nominated for the Latin Grammy Awards, in 2023 she released her first full-length album as a soloist, entitled Kaleidoscope. Parallel to her work as an artist, Glenda has worked as a music teacher at institutions like York University, the Yamaha Music School, the Miami Conservatory of Music, and the New York Piano School, among others.

== Early life ==
Glenda was born in Havana and grew up in a musical family, daughter of Cuban singer Mireya Escalante and percussionist Mayito del Monte. She became interested in music at the age of four or five, when her father took her to rehearsals of the Riverside Orchestra. In her beginnings, she was part of the Paquito González Cueto school band. She began her training as a pianist at the age of seven at the Paulita Concepción Music School, and later studied music at the Amadeo Roldán Conservatory.

Although she received classical training, she had the opportunity to form a group with her mother called Mireya Escalante & Latin Street, in which she had her first approach to salsa and Latin jazz. Still linked to the conservatory, she received an invitation to participate in a New Talent and Model Search piano competition in Toronto, which allowed her to obtain a scholarship at the Royal Conservatory of Music in Toronto, the city where she settled with her parents.

According to her, the experience of moving to Canada when she was fifteen years old "nurtured [her] creative process and [helped] her open up to a new world of sounds". There she had the opportunity to receive lessons from teachers like John Alonso and Marietta Orlov, as well as participate in various piano competitions and recitals. After graduating from the conservatory, she entered the University of Toronto, where she obtained a Bachelor of Piano Performance; she also pursued a master's degree in Ethnomusicology and Piano Performance at York University.

== Career ==
=== Glenda del E and Q-ban Mixology ===
After joining the canadian pop band The Parachute Club in the late 2000s, in the 2010s she formed the group Glenda del E & Q-ban Mixology, with which she released the album Q-ban Mixology in September 2010. According to Diario Las Américas, it is an album "that reflects the union of the genres it represents", and for the Latin Jazz Net portal, the album "fuses disparate musical languages with traditional Cuban rhythms in a popular metaphor". From then on, she had the opportunity to collaborate in other projects and musical academies such as New Cuban Generation, Echo Choir of Toronto, Big Band Leonardo Timor, and Axis Music. With her band Q-ban Mixology she has performed at events such as the Beaches Jazz Festival, the Distillery Jazz Festival, and the Mar i Jazz Festival, among others.

In 2012, she was one of the artists who participated in the recording of the compilation album The New Generation, released by the Beaches International Jazz Festival label. In 2014, she collaborated with Cuban jazz musician Paquito D'Rivera in a master class entitled The Art of Teaching and Learning, held at Carnegie Hall in Manhattan. In 2015, she was invited by Colombian singer-songwriter Fernando Osorio to play piano on his album Todo el resto que no estás, and that same year she appeared as a guest vocalist on the album Abracadabra by Cuban musician and arranger Oriente López.

=== Collaboration with Alejandro Sanz and Latin Grammy nomination ===
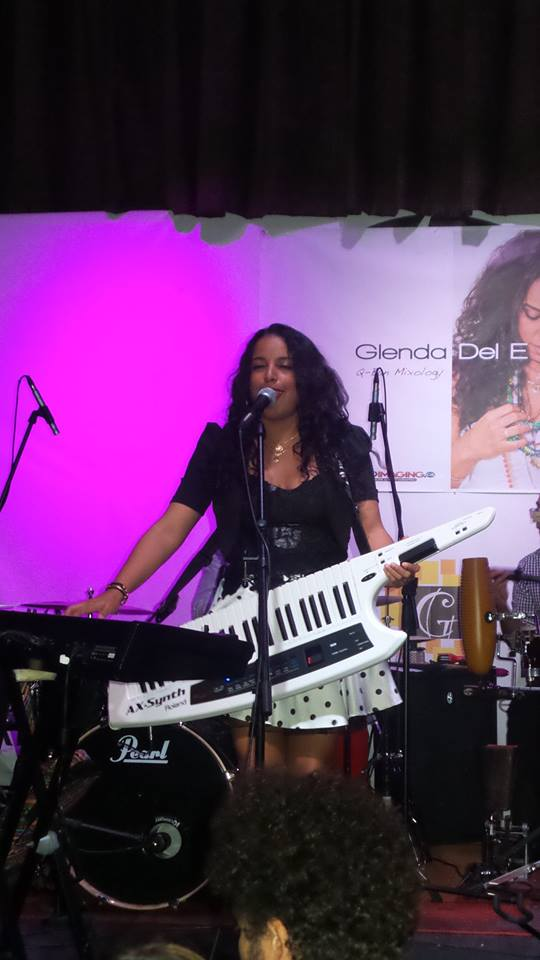
Glenda del E in 2017.

In 2015, she received an invitation from Spanish artist Alejandro Sanz to be part of his Sirope tour, in which she performed as a pianist and backing vocalist. In 2018, she participated in the recording of #El disco de Sanz and its subsequent backing tour, and collaborated as a pianist on the album Llueve alegría by Spanish singer Malú. She continued her work with Sanz for the tours Más es Más (in a unique concert held in Madrid in 2017) and Sanz en vivo (series of concerts that began in 2022).

In November 2020, she collaborated with Venezuelan singer José Luis Rodríguez during a streaming presentation entitled Directo a casa. After collaborating on the albums Miss You by Diogo Brown and Healer by Alex Cuba, in 2022 she recorded with Venezuelan violinist Daniela Padrón the album Ella, which featured production by Julio Bagué and Larry Coll and was presented live in Miami as a tribute to Latin American female composers. The album received a Latin Grammy Award nomination in the category of best instrumental album, and includes versions of songs like "Bésame Mucho" by Consuelo Velázquez, "Te aviso, te anuncio" by Shakira, "Dr. psiquiatra" by Gloria Trevi, and "Babalú" by Margarita Lecuona.

=== Solo career and present day ===
After recording the singles "Me gusta" (2019) and "Soy de aquí" (2020) as a soloist, in March 2023 she released the single "Old Havana" through her independent label, as a preview of the full-length Kaleidoscope, released the same month. The web portal Miami Hispano defined it as "an aural work that honors and pays tribute to her classical musical career, teachers, mentors, pianists and Cuban composers, in addition to her love for the culture and music of her native country".

=== Teaching and philanthropy ===
Glenda has taught music at institutions like York University, the Yamaha Music School, the Miami Conservatory of Music, the New York Piano School and the Art Plaza Conservatory, among others. She has also taught and lectured at the Art House Academy & Abbey Road Institute in Miami, and has given master classes at the University of Panama and the Valencia Berklee College of Music.

Glenda is a cultural ambassador for New York's Transdiaspora Network, a non-profit project whose mission is to promote HIV prevention and to ensure the integral development of low-income urban communities in the city through school and artistic plans.

== Influence and style ==
In an interview for the digital media Toronto Hispano, Glenda mentioned Cuban artists Chucho Valdés, Gonzalo Rubalcaba, Bebo Valdés, and José María Vitier, and international musicians Stevie Wonder, Herbie Hancock, Nina Simone, Alejandro Sanz, Hazel Scott, and Erykah Badu as her main influences.

About her musical style, Glenda said: "For me it is important to share the different styles I can interpret and compose in, that is why I always fuse a bit of soul, pop, R&B, Latin jazz, classical and popular music in each of my presentations [...] I love traditional Cuban music and it is very present during [my] show: son, rumba and the Yoruba roots of which I feel very proud".

== Discography ==
=== Studio albums ===
| Year | Title | Notes | Ref. |
|---|---|---|---|
| 2010 | Q-ban Mixology | With Q-ban Mixology | |
| 2022 | Ella | With Daniela Padrón | |
| 2023 | Kaleidoscope | As a solo artist | |

=== Singles ===
| Year | Title | Ref. |
|---|---|---|
| 2023 | "Old Havana" | |
| 2020 | "Soy de aquí" | |
| 2019 | "Me gusta" | |

=== Collaborations ===
| Year | Title | Notes | Ref. |
|---|---|---|---|
| 2012 | The New Generation | Compilation album | |
| 2015 | Todo el resto que no estás | Ft. Fernando Osorio | |
| 2015 | Abracadabra | Ft. Oriente López | |
| 2015 | Sirope vivo | Ft. Alejandro Sanz | |
| 2017 | Más es más | Ft. Alejandro Sanz | |
| 2018 | Llueve alegría | Ft. Malú | |
| 2018 | #El Disco | Ft. Alejandro Sanz | |
| 2018 | #La Gira | Ft. Alejandro Sanz | |
| 2018 | Miss You | Ft. Diogo Brown | |
| 2020 | Healer | Ft. Álex Cuba | |
| 2020 | Alejandro Sanz Live Stream | Ft. Alejandro Sanz | |

=== Filmography ===
| Year | Film | Notes | Ref. |
|---|---|---|---|
| 2008 | Pavane | Soundtrack | |
| 2018 | Sanz: Lo que fui es lo que soy | Documental | |

=== Video clips ===
| Year | Song | Notes |
|---|---|---|
| 2016 | "L.U.P." | |
| 2017 | "Inside" | Ft. Yainer Horta |
| 2017 | "Glenda del E & Q-ban Mixology Live" | |
| 2017 | "Me gusta" | |
| 2023 | "Old Havana" | |
