= Matti Pellonpää =

Finnish actor and musician

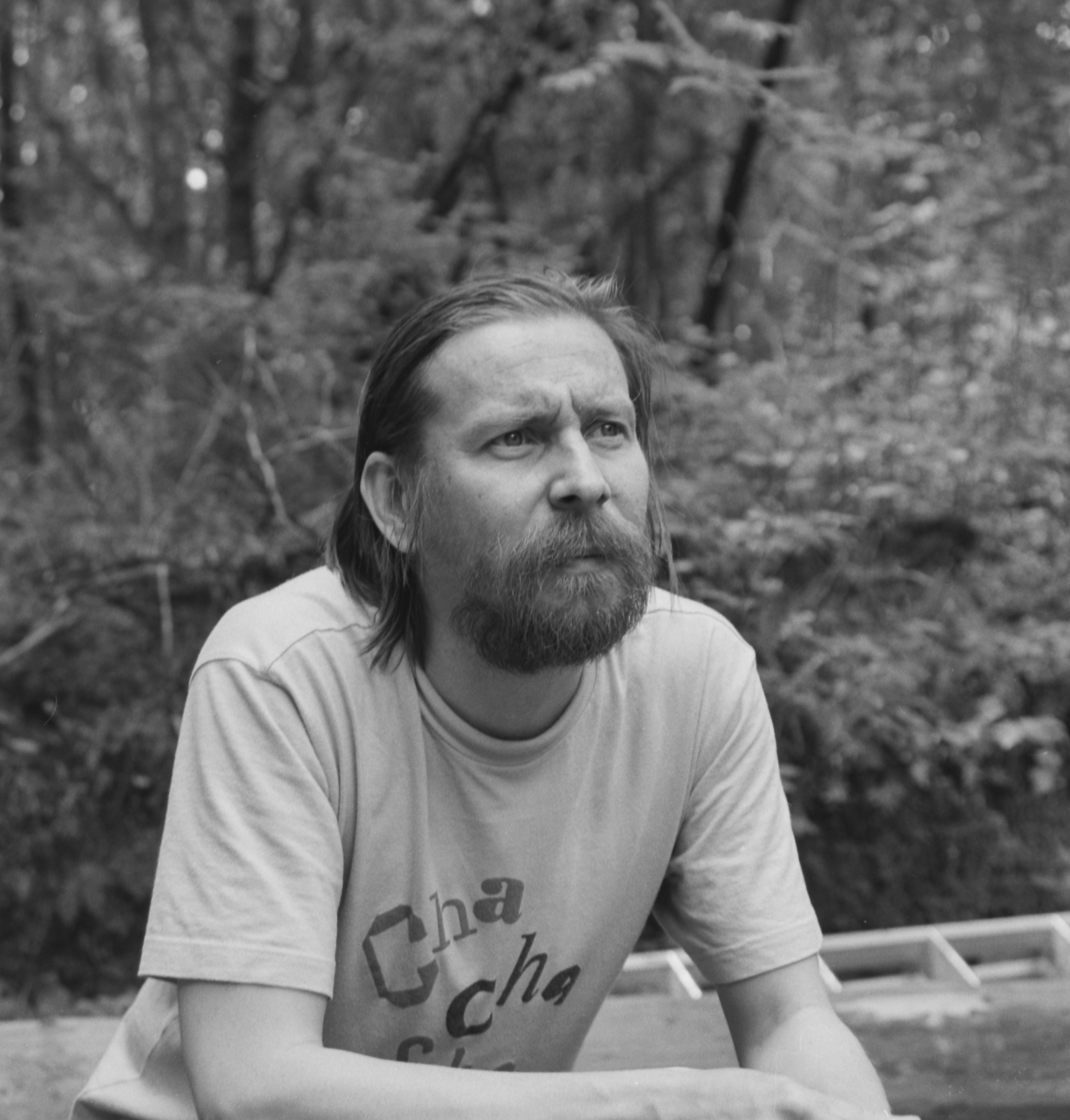
- Pellonpää in 1990
- Born: 28 March 1951; Helsinki, Finland
- Died: 13 July 1995 (aged 44); Vaasa, Finland
- Occupations: Actor; voice actor; writer
- Years active: 1962–1995

Matti Pellonpää (28 March 1951 – 13 July 1995) was a Finnish actor and a musician. He rose to international fame with his roles in both Aki Kaurismäki's and Mika Kaurismäki's films; particularly being a regular in Aki's films, appearing in 18 of them.

== Career ==
He was born in Helsinki and started his career in 1962 as a radio actor at the Finnish state-owned broadcasting company YLE. He performed as an actor during the 1970s in many amateur theatres, at the same time that he studied at the Finnish Theatre Academy, where he completed his studies in the year 1977.

He was nominated Best Actor by European Film Academy for his role as Rodolfo in La Vie de Boheme and won the Felix at the European Film Awards in 1992. He also starred in Jim Jarmusch's 1991 film Night on Earth.

His private life melded seamlessly with his acting work. He was considered a natural bohemian, and a genuine everyman without ego. He frequently used his own life as a basis for his acting, eschewing wardrobe provided, acting in his own clothes. He had a tattoo of Snoopy on his left bicep.

Pellonpää was the frontman for the band Peltsix (1989–1995). Peltsix gained cult following with its tragic, and at the same time, comic songs. Peltsix's songs were composed by Pale Saarinen, Kari Makkonen and Jukka Haikonen.

Matti Pellonpää died of a heart attack in Vaasa on 13 July 1995 at the age of 44. He was buried in the Malmi Cemetery.

In 1996, Pellonpää was one of the people commemorating 100 years of Finnish Cinema on a stamp.

A Finnish documentary film Boheemi elää/Bohemian Eyes on Pellonpää's life was made in 2011 (directed by Janne Kuusi).

== Filmography ==
- Pojat (1962), director Mikko Niskanen
- Akseli and Elina (1970), director Edvin Laine
- Kesän maku (1975), director Asko Tolonen
- Antti the Treebranch (1976), director Katariina Lahti, Heikki Partanen, Riitta Rautoma
- Viimeinen savotta (1977), director Edvin Laine
- Ruskan jälkeen (1979), director Edvin Laine
- The Liar (1981), director Mika Kaurismäki
- Sign of the Beast (1981), director Jaakko Pakkasvirta
- Jackpot2 (1982), director Mika Kaurismäki
- The Worthless (1982), director Mika Kaurismäki
- Regina ja miehet (1983), director Anssi Mänttäri
- Huhtikuu on kuukausista julmin (1983), director Anssi Mänttäri
- Crime and Punishment (1983), director Aki Kaurismäki
- The Clan – Tale of the Frogs (1984), director Mika Kaurismäki
- Kello (1984), director Anssi Mänttäri
- Aikalainen (1984), director Timo Linnasalo
- Rakkauselokuva (1984), director Anssi Mänttäri
- Viimeiset rotannahat (1985), director Anssi Mänttäri
- Calamari Union (1985), director Aki Kaurismäki
- Ylösnousemus (1985), director Anssi Mänttäri
- Shadows in Paradise (1986), director Aki Kaurismäki
- Rocky VI (1986), director Aki Kaurismäki
- Kuningas lähtee Ranskaan (1986), director Anssi Mänttäri
- Näkemiin, hyvästi (1986), director Anssi Mänttäri
- Hamlet Goes Business (1987), director Aki Kaurismäki
- Ariel (1988), director Aki Kaurismäki
- Cha cha cha (1989), director Mika Kaurismäki
- Leningrad Cowboys Go America (1989), director Aki Kaurismäki
- Kiljusen herrasväen uudet seikkailut (1990), director Matti Kuortti
- Räpsy ja Dolly (1990), director Matti Ijäs
- Zombie and the Ghost Train (1991), director Mika Kaurismäki
- Night on Earth (1991), director Jim Jarmusch
- Kadunlakaisijat (1991), director Olli Soinio
- La Vie de Bohème (1992), director Aki Kaurismäki
- Missä on Musette? (1992), director Veikko Nieminen
- Papukaijamies (1992), director Veikko Nieminen
- Det var väl själva fan också (1993), director Peter Östlund
- The Last Border (1993), director Mika Kaurismäki
- Hobitit (1993), director Timo Torikka
- Leningrad Cowboys Meet Moses (1993), director Aki Kaurismäki
- Take Care of Your Scarf, Tatiana (1993), director Aki Kaurismäki
- Iron Horsemen (1995), director Gilles Charmant
- Sirpaleita (1996), director Aku Louhimies

== Albums ==
- Peltsix / Lihaa Ja Leikkeleitä (Megamania Music, 1991)
- Peltsix / Silkkaa Kryptoniittia (Flamingo Music, 1993)

== Literature ==
- Lähikuvassa Matti Pellonpää (Lauri Timonen, Otava 2009)
