= Pia Tikka =

Finnish film director and screenwriter

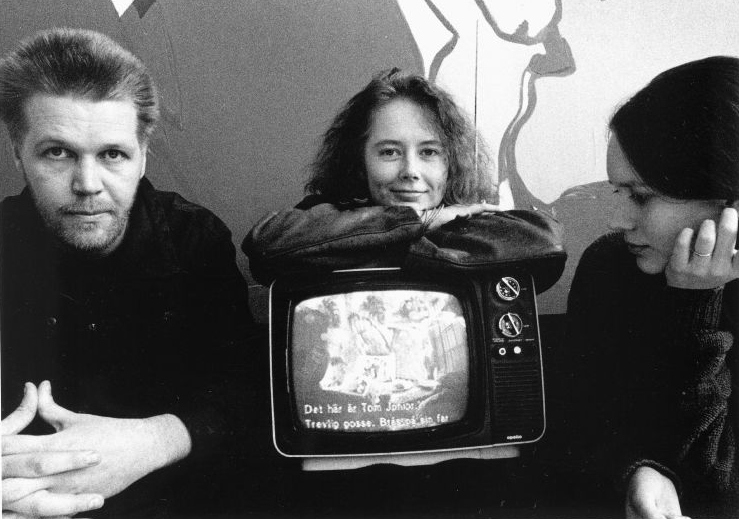
- Pia Tikka (center) with Petri Rossi and Saara Cantell during her studies at the University of Art and Design in Helsinki.
- Born: May 10, 1961 (age 63); Kankaanpää, Finland
- Occupation(s): Film director and screenwriter

Pia Tikka (born 10 May 1961 in Kankaanpää) is a Finnish film director, professor and screenwriter. Her directing works include Daughters of Yemanjá (1995) and Sand Bride (1998).

Tikka was one of the screenwriters of The Last Border (1993) by Mika Kaurismäki.

Since 2017, she has been a research professor at the Baltic Film and Media School.

== Filmography ==
Year	Title	Director	Writer
1992	Carl-Gustaf Lilius – vimma ja väsymys	Yes	No
1993	The Last Border	No	Yes
1995	Daughters of Yemanjá	Yes	Yes
1998	Sand Bride	Yes	Yes
2005	Obsessio	Yes	Yes
