= Amazon (1990 film) =

Drama film

- Film poster
- Directed by: Mika Kaurismäki
- Written by: Richard Reitinger; Mika Kaurismäki; John Reaves (additional writing)
- Starring: Kari Väänänen; Robert Davi; Rae Dawn Chong
- Cinematography: Timo Salminen
- Edited by: Michael Chandler
- Music by: Naná Vasconcelos
- Production companies: Villealfa Filmproduction Oy; Skylight Cinema Foto Art; Capital Cinema Productions; Noema; Rainforest Action Network
- Distributed by: Finnkino (Finland); Cabriolet Films (USA, theatrical); La Société des Films Sirius (France); Live Home Video (USA, home video); Mainostelevisio (Finland, TV); Avid Home Video (USA, home video); Yleisradio (Finland, (TV); Future Film (Finland, home video); Penta Visión (Uruguay); VMP (Germany)
- Release date: September 1990 (TIFF)
- Running time: 96 minutes
- Countries: United States; Finland; Brazil; France; Germany
- Languages: English; Portuguese; Finnish

Amazon is a 1990 drama that was directed by the Finnish film director Mika Kaurismäki, who co-wrote the script with Richard Reitinger, with John Reaves contributing additional writing. The movie premiered at the Toronto Festival of Festivals in September 1990.

While shooting the movie Kaurismäki tried to minimize its and the crew's effect on the environment by choosing equipment that would have the least impact to the shooting location, the surrounding areas, and its inhabitants.

== Synopsis ==
The film centers upon a Finnish businessman named Kari and his two daughters. The trio has gone to Brazil, where he decides to investigate the possibility of starting a gold mining operation in the nearby rainforest, urged on by Dan, an American expatriate interested in entering a business arrangement with Kari. He's warned against this by a local woman, Paola, who tells him that mining would have disastrous repercussions on the jungle and its inhabitants. The two begin to fall in love and Kari starts to doubt his plans. However, before he can truly act on these concerns with his prospective business partner, Kari and Dan are involved in a plane crash that kills Dan and leaves Kari terribly wounded. He's nursed back to health by a rainforest tribe, after which he returns to his daughters and Paola.

== Cast ==
- Kari Väänänen as Kari
- Robert Davi as Dan
- Rae Dawn Chong as Paola
- Minna Sovio as Nina
- Aili Sovio as Lea
- Ruy Polanah as Julio Cesar
- Pirkko Hämäläinen as Susanne
- Expedito Barreira as Dealer
- Luis Otavio as Money Changer
- Sidney Martins as Thief
- Ana Mel as Black Whore
- Abimael Tosin as First Flight Customer

== Reception ==
Amazon's critical reception has been mixed. In his review in The New York Times, film critic Vincent Canby wrote that Amazon "is not the most exciting movie ever made, but it doesn't push. It is laid back. The flora and fauna are interesting and the cast is attractive." Variety was mixed, stating "Visually film is always stimulating but storytelling is wildly uneven, and director Mika Kaurismaki has an uncertain command of pic's tone. Acting is okay."

Pietari Kääpä commented upon the movie in his 2012 book Directory of World Cinema: Finland, calling it an "environmentally aware film" while also stating "In Amazon, we are made privy to a clear environmentalist argument about the need to preserve the Amazonian rainforest. But, simultaneously, it maintains many of these problematic binaries, such as humanity's exploitative relationship with nature."

=== Awards ===
- Jussi Award for Best Sound Recording (1991, won)
