= Jon (film) =

1983 film

- Directed by: Jaakko Pyhälä
- Written by: Heikki Vuento; Jaakko Pyhälä
- Produced by: Jaakko Pyhälä
- Starring: Kari Väänänen
- Cinematography: Pertti Mutanen
- Release date: 25 February 1983
- Running time: 127 minutes
- Country: Finland
- Language: Finnish

Jon is a 1983 Finnish drama film directed by Jaakko Pyhälä. It was entered into the 13th Moscow International Film Festival.

== Cast ==
- Kari Väänänen as Jon
- Vesa-Matti Loiri as Heikki Öljynen
- Pia Tellefsen as Gunilla (as Pia-Beate Tellefsen)
- Nils Utsi as Raineri - fisherman
- Vesa Vierikko as Dietmar
- Timo Torikka as Kittilä
- Esa Pakarinen Jr. as Grieg
- Anne Beate Odland as Susanne de Wrees
- Randi Koch as Katrin
- Juhani Tuominen as Kettunen
