= The Liar (1981 film) =

- Original Finnish film poster
- Directed by: Mika Kaurismäki
- Starring: Aki Kaurismäki; Pirkko Hämäläinen
- Release date: 28 February 1981
- Running time: 53min
- Country: Finland
- Language: Finnish

The Liar (Finnish: Valehtelija) is a 1981 Finnish comedy film directed by Mika Kaurismäki. The film, in which the director also played, is his diploma film and directorial debut

== Cast ==
- Aki Kaurismäki - Ville Alfa
- Pirkko Hämäläinen - Tuula
- Juuso Hirvikangas - Juuso
- Lars Lindberg - Harri
- Esa Sirkkunen - Olli
- Jukka Järvelä - Man at Bar Counter
- Marja Heiskanen - Kiosk Vendor
- Matti Pellonpää - Friend of Chandler
