= Daniela Padrón =

Venezuelan violinist

- Born: Daniela Virginia Padrón López; Caracas, Venezuela
- Genres: Instrumental, world music, classical, Jazz, Folk
- Occupations: Violinist, composer, arranger
- Instrument: Violin
- Labels: Pristine Music and Oleta Music

Daniela Padrón is a Venezuelan violinist, arranger, teacher and composer based in the United States. She has obtained three nominations for the Latin Grammy Awards, in 2013 in the category of best folk album for her work on the album Luz, una navidad celta en Venezuela by the group Gaêlica, in 2022 in the category of best instrumental album for the album Ella, in collaboration with the Cuban pianist and singer Glenda del E, and in 2025 for the album Joropango, in collaboration with the folk band Kerreke in the category of best folk album which secured Daniela her first-ever Latin Grammy win.

September 29th, 2025, has been officially proclaimed as DANIELA PADRÓN DAY by the Mayor and Commissioners of Miami Beach, the city where Daniela has resided for the past decade.

== Biography ==
=== Early life and education ===
Born in Caracas, Venezuela in 1987 from her mother the Venezuelan pianist Olga Lopez and her father Paciano Padron a Venezuelan politician. Daniela Padrón began her musical training at the "Escuela de Música Olga López", later on "Escuela Experimental de Música Manuel Alberto López" in her hometown. Despite studying both piano and violin during that time, she ultimately opted for the violin. She received a scholarship from Fundación Mozarteum to study with renowned French violinist Virginie Robilliard, and in 2005 she earned her Bachelor of Music in Violin Performance under the guidance of Maestros Jose Elias Zapata, Maria Fernanda Montero, and Virginie Robilliard. In 2009 she received her Bachelor of Science in Business Administration from Universidad Metropolitana (Caracas, Venezuela, 2009)

=== First Latin Grammy Nomination ===
During her teenage years, she became a member of a rock band, which allowed her to explore a different musical environment from the traditional and academic to the more contemporary and experimental. This experience eventually led her to join the Venezuelan world music band Gaêlica as a violinist. As a member of this group, in 2013 she achieved her first nomination for the Latin Grammy Awards in the category of best folk album for her work on the album Luz, una navidad celta en Venezuela.

=== Solo career, second and third Latin Grammy Nomination ===
In 2012, Padrón decided to move to the United States. Based in Miami, she initially conducted a children's orchestra and worked as a music teacher. In the mid-2010s she got in touch with musician César Muñoz and returned to the artistic environment. In 2016 she released his first album as a soloist, entitled Bach to Venezuela, which features compositions by Johann Sebastian Bach with Venezuelan rhythms.

=== Latin Grammy Winner ===
Together with the band Kerreke, Daniela Padrón won the Latin Grammy for Best Folk Album in 2025 with their album Joropango. best folk album .

After sharing the stage with artists such as Willie Colón, Aymée Nuviola, Rosario, Lolita Flores, Soledad Bravo, Kristhyan Benítez and Frank Quintero, in 2022 she recorded together with Cuban pianist and arranger Glenda del E the album Ella, which was produced by Julio Bagué and Larry Coll. The album was nominated for a Latin Grammy Award in the category of best instrumental album, and includes versions of songs like "Te aviso, te anuncio" by Shakira, "Bésame mucho" by Consuelo Velázquez, "Babalú" by Margarita Lecuona and "Dr. psiquiatra" by Gloria Trevi, among others. From this album the piece "Suite Criolla: I. Polo" granted Daniela a nomination on the Pepsi Music Awards 2023 on its Classical Music (Theme) category. In 2023 Daniela signed a publishing deal with Peermusic. In 2025 she released Joropango with the folk band Kerreke, produced by Julio Bagué. The album was nominated for a Latin Grammy Award in the category of best folk album.

== Discography ==
=== With Gaêlica ===
- 2009 - Paz: una navidad celta en Venezuela
- 2012 - Luz: una navidad celta en Venezuela
- 2024 - Origins

=== As a solo artist ===
- 2016 - Bach to Venezuela
- 2020 - +58
- 2023 - SOLA

=== With Olga López (her mother) ===
- 2018 - LATAM

=== With Glenda del E ===
- 2022 - Ella

=== With Kerreke ===
- 2025 - Joropango

== Awards and Recognitions ==
- 2001 - Maurice Hasson National Violin Competition
- 2003 - Maurice Hasson National Violin Competition
- 2013 - Latin Grammy Nomination - Best Folk Album with Gaêlica's album: Luz, Una Navidad Celta en Venezuela
- 2022 - Latin Grammy Nomination - Best Instrumental Album with the album "Ella", along Glenda Del E
- 2023 - Pepsi Music Awards - Best Classical Theme with Polo, from Modesta Bor's Suite Criolla (recorded on her album "Ella", along Glenda Del E)
- 2024 - Miami Individual Arts Grantee by the Miami-Dade County Department of Cultural Affairs
- 2025 - September 29th, 2025, has been officially proclaimed as DANIELA PADRÓN DAY by the Major and Commissioners of Miami Beach, the city where Daniela has resided for the past decade.
- 2025 - Miami Individual Arts Grantee by the Miami-Dade County Department of Cultural Affairs
- 2025 - Latin Grammy Winner - Best Folk Album with the album "Joropango", along Kerreke
