= The Worthless (film) =

- Original Finnish film poster
- Directed by: Mika Kaurismäki
- Written by: Aki Kaurismäki; Mika Kaurismäki
- Starring: Matti Pellonpää; Pirkko Hämäläinen; Juuso Hirvikangas
- Cinematography: Timo Salminen
- Edited by: Antti Kari
- Music by: Anssi Tikanmäki
- Production company: Villealfa Filmproductions
- Distributed by: Finnkino
- Release date: 15 October 1982
- Running time: 119 minutes
- Country: Finland
- Language: Finnish

The Worthless (Finnish: Arvottomat) is a 1982 Finnish film directed by Mika Kaurismäki, who also co-wrote the film with his brother Aki Kaurismäki. It is a road movie about two men and a woman driving around the country as they are being chased by a group of criminals and the police.

Mika Kaurismäki won the Jussi Award for Best Direction for the film.

== Cast ==
- Matti Pellonpää as Manne
- Pirkko Hämäläinen as Veera
- Juuso Hirvikangas as Harri Salminen
- Esko Nikkari as Hagström
- Jorma Markkula as Mitja
- Asmo Hurula as Väyry
- Ari Piispa as Vasili
- Aki Kaurismäki as Ville Alfa
- Aino Seppo as Tiina
- Veikko Aaltonen as Juippi
- Elina Kivihalme as Anna-Kaarina
