= Night on Earth =

1991 film by Jim Jarmusch

- Theatrical release poster
- Directed by: Jim Jarmusch
- Written by: Jim Jarmusch
- Produced by: Jim Jarmusch
- Starring: Winona Ryder; Gena Rowlands; Giancarlo Esposito; Armin Mueller-Stahl; Rosie Perez; Isaach de Bankolé; Béatrice Dalle; Roberto Benigni; Paolo Bonacelli; Matti Pellonpää; Kari Väänänen; Sakari Kuosmanen; Tomi Salmela
- Cinematography: Frederick Elmes
- Edited by: Jay Rabinowitz
- Music by: Tom Waits
- Production companies: Locus Solus Entertainment; JVC; Victor Music Industries; Le Studio Canal+; Pandora Film; Channel Four Films
- Distributed by: Fine Line Features (United States); France Eigasha (Japan); Pyramide Distribution (France); Pandora Cinema (Germany); Electric Pictures (United Kingdom)
- Release dates: October 4, 1991 (New York Film Festival); December 12, 1991 (Germany); December 18, 1991 (France); April 25, 1992 (Japan); May 1, 1992 (United States); July 31, 1992 (United Kingdom)
- Running time: 129 minutes
- Countries: United States; Japan; France; Germany; United Kingdom
- Languages: English; German; French; Italian; Finnish
- Box office: $2.1 million

Night on Earth is a 1991 comedy-drama anthology film written, produced, and directed by Jim Jarmusch. It is a collection of five vignettes that take place roughly simultaneously on the same night, concerning the temporary bond formed between taxi driver and passenger in five cities: Los Angeles, New York City, Paris, Rome, and Helsinki.

Jarmusch wrote the screenplay in approximately eight days, and the choice of certain cities was largely based on the actors with whom he wanted to work. The accompanying soundtrack is by Tom Waits. The Criterion Collection released the film on DVD and Blu-ray on April 9, 2019.

== Plot ==
=== Los Angeles ===
At 7:07 p.m., tomboy cabbie Corky picks up Hollywood casting director Victoria Snelling from the airport, and as Corky drives, Victoria tries to conduct business on her phone. Despite their extreme differences socially, the two develop a certain connection, and Corky reveals her goal to become a mechanic. Arriving at her Beverly Hills mansion, Victoria, who has been scouting inexperienced young actors for an upcoming film project, suggests that Corky would be ideal for a part in the film, but Corky rejects the offer, determined to follow her dream of becoming a mechanic, and the two part amicably. The taxi is a 1985 Chevrolet Caprice Classic Wagon.

=== New York ===
Helmut Grokenberger, an immigrant from East Germany who was a clown in his home country, is on his first day as a cab driver. At 10:07 p.m., he picks up YoYo, a streetwise young man who wants to go from Manhattan to Brooklyn. Increasingly alarmed at Helmut's inability to handle an automatic transmission, ignorance of New York geography, and feeble command of the English language, YoYo takes over the wheel. During the drive, YoYo spots his sister-in-law Angela walking down the street by herself and forces her into the cab to take her back home. Helmut is clearly amused by the bickering between the two. After YoYo and Angela depart, Helmut struggles to drive back to Manhattan. The taxi is a 1983 Ford LTD Crown Victoria.

=== Paris ===
At 4:07 a.m., a cab picks up two drunk African diplomats, who mock the lowly driver and find it hilarious that he is from the Ivory Coast. In French, when he says he is ivoirien, they say il y voit rien ("he can't see a thing"). Sick of their insults, he throws them out, forgetting to collect the fare. He then picks up an attractive young woman, who is blind. When he asks her where she thinks he is from, she correctly guesses he is from the Ivory Coast, prompting him to ask her questions related to her blindness. Annoyed, she asserts that she can feel things in a way he will never understand. After he drops her off, she walks beside a canal and hears the cab crash into another car, smiling as the other driver angrily asks if the cabbie is blind. The taxi is a 1980 Peugeot 504.

=== Rome ===
At 4:07 a.m., an eccentric cabbie named Gino picks up a priest. Despite the priest's protests, Gino asks to confess his sins and details how he discovered his sexuality in his early teens, first with a pumpkin and then with a sheep, before describing a sexual encounter he had with his brother's wife in graphic detail. Already ailing and overwhelmed by the barrage of unwanted information, the priest dies of a heart attack. Unable to revive him, Gino leaves the dead body on a bench and speeds away. The taxi is a 1976 Fiat 128.

=== Helsinki ===
At 5:07 a.m., cab driver Mika picks up three drunken men, whereupon two of the men place their unconscious friend, Aki, in the back seat and explain that, the previous day, he lost his job, his brand-new car was destroyed, and his wife announced plans to divorce him after discovering their teenage daughter is pregnant. Mika counters that things could be worse, recounting that he and his wife had long been saving money to have a baby. When his wife finally became pregnant, the baby was born prematurely and had to be placed in an incubator; the doctor told them the baby would only live a week. The baby lived a few weeks longer than expected, giving Mika and his wife hope. However, the baby eventually died. Aki's friends are deeply moved by the story, and even become unsympathetic towards their companion. Leaving Aki in the back seat, the two stagger off to their homes. Mika wakes Aki, takes payment and drives away. As Aki sits down on the snow-covered ground, passing neighbors greet him and he replies back. The taxi is a 1973 Volvo 144.

== Cast ==
Los Angeles

- Gena Rowlands as Victoria Snelling (passenger)
- Winona Ryder as Corky (taxi driver)

New York

- Armin Mueller-Stahl as Helmut Grokenberger (taxi driver and passenger)
- Giancarlo Esposito as YoYo (passenger and taxi driver)
- Rosie Perez as Angela (passenger)

Paris

- Isaach de Bankolé as the taxi driver
- Béatrice Dalle as the blind woman (passenger)
- Pascal N'Zonzi and Émil Abossolo-Mbo (credited as Émile Abossolo-M'Bo) as the African passengers

Rome

- Roberto Benigni as Gino (taxi driver)
- Paolo Bonacelli as the priest (passenger)

Helsinki

- Matti Pellonpää as Mika (taxi driver)
- Kari Väänänen, Sakari Kuosmanen, and Tomi Salmela as the passengers

== Production and reception ==
=== Filming ===
The film was shot on location in Los Angeles, New York City, Paris, Rome, and Helsinki.

=== Soundtrack ===
- "Back in the Good Old World" – written by Tom Waits and Kathleen Brennan; arranged by Waits and Francis Thumm
- "Good Old World" – written by Waits and Brennan; rearranged by Waits and Thumm
- "Cycle-Delic" – performed by Davie Allan and the Arrows (as Davie Allan & the Arrows); written by Davie Allan
- "Summertime Blues" – performed by Blue Cheer; written by Eddie Cochran and Jerry Capehart

=== Critical response ===
On the review aggregator website Rotten Tomatoes, the film holds an approval rating of 77% based on 26 reviews, with an average rating of 7.4/10.

Roger Ebert ranked the film 3 stars out of a possible 4, saying Jarmusch “creates a worldwide feeling of kinship”. All performers had some good moments, but the New York segment was most humorous and the Rome segment the least successful while Ebert declared the part filmed in Helsinki was “almost unbearably sad”.
