= Helsinki Napoli All Night Long =

1987 gangster-comedy film directed by Mika Kaurismäki

- Directed by: Mika Kaurismäki
- Written by: Mika Kaurismäki; Richard Reitinger
- Produced by: Mika Kaurismäki; Christa Saredi; Francis Von Buren
- Starring: Kari Väänänen; Nino Manfredi; Eddie Constantine
- Cinematography: Helge Weindler
- Edited by: Helga Borsche
- Music by: Jacques Zwart
- Release date: 1987
- Country: Finland

Helsinki Napoli All Night Long (also released as Helsinki – Napoli) is a gangster-comedy film written, directed and produced by Mika Kaurismäki.

== Cast ==
- Kari Väänänen as Alex
- Roberta Manfredi as Stella
- Jean-Pierre Castaldi as Igor
- Margi Clarke as Mara
- Nino Manfredi as Grandpa
- Eddie Constantine as Old Gangster
- Ugo Fangareggi as Neapolitan
- Samuel Fuller as Boss
- Melanie Robeson as Lilli
- Jim Jarmusch as Barkeeper
- Sakari Kuosmanen as Young Gangster
- Remo Remotti as Neapolitan
- Wim Wenders as Gas Station Attendant
- Harry Baer as Man

== Production ==
Mika Kaurismäki wrote the film's script during a stay in Rome in 1986. The film was shot in West Berlin between 21 April and 19 June 1987. The reported budget was between 8.5 million and 10 million markka.

== Release ==
The film was released in Finland on 13 November 1987. It was released in Italy as Napoli–Berlino – Un taxi nella notte, with Berlin replacing Helsinki in the title.
