= Zombie and the Ghost Train =

- Film poster
- Directed by: Mika Kaurismäki
- Screenplay by: Mika Kaurismäki
- Story by: Sakke Järvenpää; Mika Kaurismäki; Pauli Pentti
- Produced by: Mika Kaurismäki
- Starring: Silu Seppälä; Marjo Leinonen; Matti Pellonpää
- Cinematography: Olli Varja
- Edited by: Mika Kaurismäki
- Music by: Mauri Sumén
- Distributed by: Finnkino
- Release date: 26 July 1991 (Finland)
- Running time: 88 minutes
- Country: Finland
- Languages: Finnish; English; Turkish

Zombie and the Ghost Train (Finnish: Zombie ja Kummitusjuna) is a 1991 Finnish film directed by Mika Kaurismäki. It focuses on Antti (aka Zombie), a loner who loves performing music but leads a miserable life otherwise.

== Cast ==
- Silu Seppälä as Zombie
- Marjo Leinonen as Marjo
- Matti Pellonpää as Harri
- Vieno Saaristo as Äiti
- Juhani Niemelä as Isä

== Reception ==
Janet Maslin of The New York Times wrote, "Mr. Kaurismaki is more successful with wry, atmospheric touches than with efforts to find emotional intensity in Zombie's plight." Kevin Thomas wrote, "It is as fine as anything either of the talented, charismatic Kaurismaki brothers has ever done. It is a rueful, often darkly funny portrait".

== See also ==
- Docufiction
- List of docufiction films
