= Obrigado Brazil =

Studio album by Yo-Yo Ma
- Released: July 29, 2003
- Recorded: March 13, 2002 – August 27, 2002
- Genre: Classical, Bossa nova
- Length: 63:21
- Label: Sony

Professional ratings
Review scores
Source	Rating
Allmusic	(4/5)

Obrigado Brazil is a music album by Yo-Yo Ma.

In this context "obrigado" means "thank you" in Portuguese.

== Track listing ==
1. "Cristal" (Cesar Camargo Mariano) – 2:49
2. "Chega de Saudade" (Antonio Carlos Jobim) – 4:16
3. "A Lenda Do Caboclo" (Heitor Villa-Lobos) – 3:10
4. "Doce De Coco" (Jaco Do Bandolim) – 5:12
5. "Dança Brasileira" (Camargo Mazart Guarnieri) – 2:18
6. "Apelo" (Baden Powell) – 4:57
7. "Dança Negra" (Guarnieri) – 3:31
8. "I X O (Um a Zero)" (Pixinguinha) – 2:40
9. "Menino" (Sergio Assad) – 5:36
10. "Samambaia" (Mariano) – 5:19
11. "Carinhoso" (Pixinguinha) – 4:48
12. "Alma Brasileira" (Heitor Villa-Lobos) – 5:05
13. "O Amor em Paz" (unknown) – 3:52
14. "Bodas De Prata & Quatro Cantos" (Egberto Gismonti, G.E. Carneiro) – 9:48
15. "Brasileirinho" (Waldir Azevedo) – 3:30
16. "Salvador" (Egberto Gismonti) – 4:53

== Personnel ==
- Yo-Yo Ma – Cello
- Helio Alves – Piano
- Odair Assad – Guitar
- Sergio Assad – Guitar, Arranger
- Cyro Baptista – Percussion
- Paulinho Braga – Drums
- Jose DaSilva – Percussion
- Jose DeFaria – Percussion
- Paquito D'Rivera – Clarinet
- Egberto Gismonti – Flute, Guitar, Piano, Arranger
- Romero Lubambo – Guitar, Cavaquinho
- Cesar Camargo Mariano – Piano
- Nilson Matta – Bass
- Rosa Passos – Guitar, Vocals
- Kathryn Stott – Piano
- Todd Whitelock – Engineer

== Production ==
- Dominik Blech – Engineer, Intern
- Jorge Calandrelli – Arranger, Producer
- Stephen Danelian – Photography
- Ruth DeSarno – A&R
- Steven Epstein – Producer
- Michelle Errante – Product Manager
- Gil Gilbert – Photography, Assistant
- Phillip Huscher – Liner Notes
- Janush Kawa – Photography
- Richard King – Engineer
- Laura Kszan – Editorial Director
- Andreas Meyer – Assistant Engineer, Technical Supervisor
- Christopher Ottaunick – Photography
- Laraine Perri – Executive Producer
- Peta Scriba – Assistant Engineer
- Keith Shortreed – Assistant Engineer
- Roxanne Slimak – Art Direction
- Jason Spears – Assistant Engineer
- Jason Stasium – Assistant Engineer
