= Hobitit =

Finnish live action fantasy television miniseries

- Genre: Miniseries
- Written by: Timo Torikka
- Directed by: Timo Torikka
- Starring: Matti Pellonpää; Martti Suosalo; Vesa Vierikko; Ville Virtanen; Kari Väänänen; Leif Wager
- Composer: Toni Edelmann
- Country of origin: Finland
- Original language: Finnish
- No. of episodes: 9

Production
- Producer: Olof Qvickström
- Production locations: Ryhmäteatteri theatre, Yle
- Running time: 9 × 30 minutes
- Production companies: Yle; Ryhmateatteri

Original release
- Network: Yle TV1
- Release: 29 March – 24 May 1993

Hobitit (The Hobbits) is a nine-part Finnish live-action fantasy television miniseries directed by Timo Torikka, originally broadcast in 1993 on Yle TV1.

It is based on a six-hour play, Taru sormusten herrasta (The Lord of the Rings), put on by Ryhmäteatteri theatre company at the Suomenlinna Summer Theatre, with many of the same actors; the play was in turn an adaptation of J. R. R. Tolkien's The Lord of the Rings. The series quite faithfully adapts the events until The Council of Elrond, and then focuses on the journey of the Hobbits Frodo Baggins and Sam Gamgee. The series was praised in the Finnish press. The Finnish Tolkien society wrote that Hobitit had captured the book's spirit and atmosphere, despite its small budget.

== Plot ==
The series is based on J. R. R. Tolkien's The Lord of the Rings, in nine episodes. It omits the parts where the Hobbits Frodo Baggins and Sam Gamgee are not present. The narrator is an older Sam, who tells his story to an audience of young Hobbits several years after the events of the War of the Ring.

In the first episode, titled Bilbo, Sam provides a brief account of the origin of the One Ring and how it came into Gollum's possession. Bilbo Baggins finds the Ring and defeats Gollum in a game of riddles on his way to the Lonely Mountain. In episode 2, Tie ("The Road"), Bilbo celebrates his birthday and leaves the Ring to Frodo. On Gandalf's advice, Frodo and Sam leave the Shire; their friends Merry Brandybuck and Pippin Took join them. In episode 3, Vanha metsä ("The Old Forest"), the Hobbits travel through the Old Forest, getting into troubles with Old Man Willow and then with a Barrow-wight. They are saved in both cases by Tom Bombadil. Meanwhile, Gandalf heads for Isengard, where he discovers Saruman's betrayal.

In episode 4, Pomppiva poni ("The Prancing Pony"), the Hobbits arrive at Bree's Prancing Pony Inn, where the host Barliman Butterbur gives them a message from Gandalf. They meet Strider (Aragorn), who guides them towards Rivendell, but the Black Riders start to pursue them. In episode 5, Konkari ("Strider"), the Black Riders wound Frodo but the party manages to reach Rivendell, where Frodo is healed. At The Council of Elrond it is decided that the Ring must be destroyed and the Fellowship of the Ring is formed. In episode 6, Lorien, the Fellowship travels south via Moria, where the Orcs attack them and Gandalf apparently dies in a fight with a Balrog. The others flee under the leadership of Strider to Lothlórien, where they meet Galadriel. After travelling further south along the Anduin, the Fellowship breaks up: Frodo and Sam continue the journey to Mordor on their own, while Merry and Pippin are captured by the Orcs and Boromir is killed.

Hobitit focuses on Frodo and Sam's journey. Here they realize Gollum is on their trail in the Emyn Muil, as Mount Doom erupts in the background.

In episode 7, Mordor, Frodo and Sam travel through the Emyn Muil to Mordor and face Gollum, who they force to be their guide. It is mentioned (but not shown) that Pippin and Merry freed themselves and helped the Ents destroying Isengard and exiling Saruman; they rejoined with Aragorn, Legolas and Gimli, as well as with Gandalf, who managed to survive the fight with the Balrog. In episode 8, Tuomiovuori ("Mount Doom"), Gollum guides Frodo and Sam to the Black Gate, which proves to be impassable, and then brings them to Cirith Ungol, where Frodo is paralysed by Shelob.

Finally, in episode 9, Vapautus ("Liberation"), Sam saves Frodo and helps him to reach Mount Doom. At the last moment Frodo declares the Ring as his own, but Gollum bites it from his finger and falls into the mountain's fire, destroying the Ring. Sam and Frodo wake up in Gondor, where they are reunited with Gandalf, Pippin and Merry, and hear that Aragorn has become King of Gondor. The Hobbits head home with Gandalf, who leaves them after reaching Bree; they have to free the Shire from Saruman's rule. Frodo travels to the Grey Havens to leave the Middle-Earth, and Sam concludes his story, hinting that he will soon do the same.

== Production ==
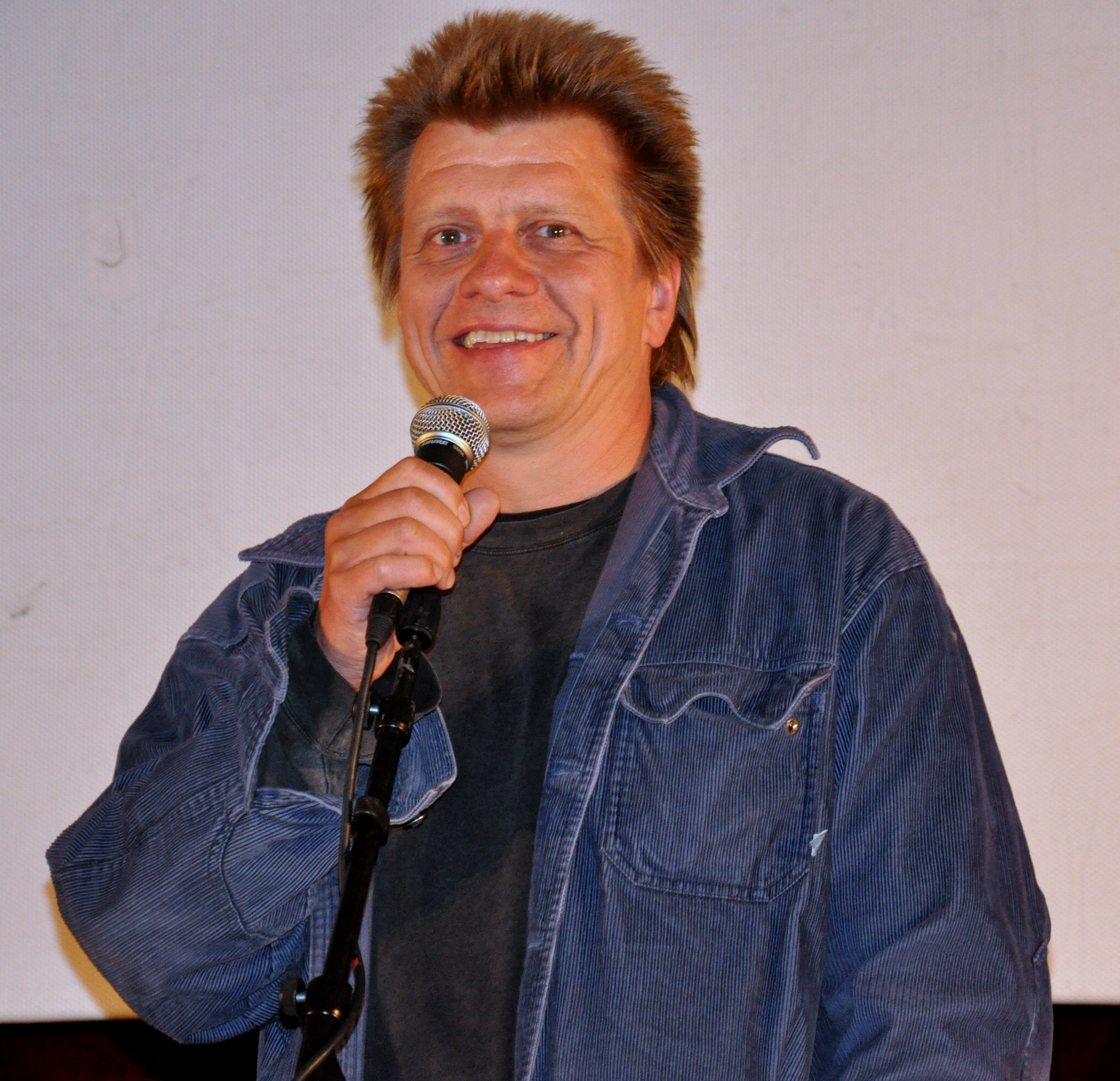
The actor Timo Torikka wrote and directed Hobitit.

The production was based on a six-hour play, Taru sormusten herrasta (The Lord of the Rings), put on by Ryhmäteatteri theatre company at the Suomenlinna Summer Theatre in 1988 and 1989, directed by Raila Leppäkoski and Arto af Hällström. The broadcaster Yle had the option of adapting the play directly to television, but this approach was rejected as making no sense on screen. An alternative approach that was considered, was producing a children's series centered on Toni Edelmann's musical arrangements of Tolkien's poems that had been used in the play, but it proved difficult to relate them to the story, and the idea was abandoned. Instead, it was decided to tell the story from the Hobbits' perspective, cutting other parts of Tolkien's narrative. The series was written and directed by Timo Torikka, who had played Pippin in the play, and co-written by Edelman, who had composed the play's music.

Hobitit featured nine episodes of 30 minutes each; these aired from 29 March to 24 May 1993, and rerun in 1997–1998. Most of the actors repeated their roles from the play, with fresh talent of Jari Pehkonen as Pippin and Leif Wager as Elrond. Filming locations included the Ryhmäteatteri theatre company's stage in Helsinki and Yle's studio production facilities. Some sequences were shot outdoors with natural backgrounds, while a large number of scale models were used for scenes such as of the Shire and the village of Bree. Studio sequences were filmed using bluescreen, allowing landscapes to be added digitally by chroma key compositing.

== Coverage of the book ==
The series focuses on the quest undertaken by the Hobbits Frodo and Sam to destroy the Ring. Accordingly, it omits the parts of Tolkien's novel, such as the epic battles, that are not seen by these characters.

Coverage of the novel
Tolkien Book	Hobitit (numbered episodes)	Excluded events not seen by Frodo and Sam
I	1) Bilbo and the Ring 2) The Shire 3) Old Forest 4) Bree 5) Weathertop	—————
II	5 cont'd) Council of Elrond 6) Moria, Lothlórien	—————
III	6 cont'd) Parth Galen (Isengard is mentioned, not shown)	Rohan, Battle of Helm's Deep, Isengard
IV	7) Emyn Muil 8) Black Gate, Cirith Ungol	—————
V	—————	Battle of Pelennor Fields; Battle of the Morannon
VI	9) Mount Doom, Scouring of the Shire, Grey Havens	—————

== Reception ==
In a review in Helsingin Sanomat, Jukka Kajava praised the new family series for its strong story. He admired the acting, including Kari Väänänen's Gollum and Pertti Sveholm's Sam Gamgee. Four years later, when the series was rerun, Kajava was more critical, stating that the concreteness of the television adaptation might limit the viewer's imagination too much compared to the original work.

Juho Gröndahl, writing in the Finnish Tolkien Society's magazine Legolas in 2004, recalled that Hobitit had succeeded in "capturing the atmosphere and spirit of the book" despite the fact that it was created "on a small budget in quite shocking sets". In addition to the successful acting and "pensive appearance", he attributed the success of the series to a clear choice of perspective, not trying to tell the whole story of Tolkien's novel but focussing on Frodo and Sam's journey. Similarly, Gröndahl was doubtful of Peter Jackson's The Lord of the Rings film trilogy, as he felt that the "epic and flamboyant side of the book that is emphasized in [Jackson's] film adaptation is not the most enduring and interesting aspect" of Tolkien's work.

== Cast ==
The series's cast included the following actors and their roles:

- Taneli Mäkelä – Frodo Baggins [Frodo Reppuli]
- Pertti Sveholm – Samwise Gamgee [Samvais Gamgi]
- Jari Pehkonen – Peregrin Took [Peregrin Tuk]
- Jarmo Hyttinen – Meriadoc Brandybuck [Meriadoc Rankkibuk]
- Vesa Vierikko – Gandalf [Gandalf Harmaa]
- Kari Väänänen – Gollum [Klonkku], Aragorn/Strider [Konkari]
- Ville Virtanen – Legolas
- Tomi Salmela – Gimli
- Carl-Kristian Rundman – Boromir
- Martti Suosalo – Bilbo Baggins [Bilbo Reppuli]
- Esko Hukkanen – Tom Bombadil
- Leif Wager – Elrond
- Matti Pellonpää – Saruman
- Mikko Kivinen – Barliman Butterbur [Viljami Voivalvatti]
