= The Last Border =

1993 Finnish film

- Directed by: Mika Kaurismäki
- Written by: Mika Kaurismäki; Pia Tikka; Alexandra Deman
- Produced by: Mika Kaurismäki
- Starring: Jolyon Baker; Jürgen Prochnow; Fanny Bastien; Kari Väänänen
- Cinematography: Timo Salminen
- Music by: Anssi Tikanmäki
- Release dates: 20 August 1993 (Finland); 12 September 1993 (Canada)
- Running time: 105 minutes
- Countries: Finland, Germany, Sweden, France
- Language: English

The Last Border (Finnish: The Last Border – viimeisellä rajalla) is a 1993 Finnish post-apocalyptic film directed, written, and produced by Mika Kaurismäki, starring Jolyon Baker, Jürgen Prochnow, Fanny Bastien and Kari Väänänen. The film takes place in the near future for 2009, when global pollution has forced people to move to the Arctic Circle, being the only viable territory.

The film was premiered at the 1993 Toronto International Film Festival.

== Cast ==
- Jolyon Baker as Jake
- Jürgen Prochnow as Duke
- Fanny Bastien as Doaiva
- Kari Väänänen as Borka
- Matti Pellonpää as Dimitri
- Soli Labbart as Old woman
- Clas-Ove Bruun as Skunk
- Jussi Lampi as Rabbit
- Juice Leskinen as Bartender
- Esko Salminen as Jake's father
- Jochen Nickel as Beggar
- Mato Valtonen as Drunkard
- Sakke Järvenpää as Biker

== Reception ==
Rotten Tomatoes gives The Last Border a score of 12% based on 60 ratings by audience.

In Variety magazine's October 1993 review, Emanuel Levy called film "a spoof of the Mad Max cult films." He comments, that the film's "subtle humor and moderate violence (by today's standards) may disappoint viewers expecting excessive treatment of such matters", but also said, that its "impressive visual design and strong perfs by Matti Pellonpää and Jürgen Prochnow could broaden satire's commercial prospects beyond the midnight circuit."
