= The Clan – Tale of the Frogs =

1984 film

- Original Finnish film poster
- Directed by: Mika Kaurismäki
- Written by: Aki Kaurismäki; Mika Kaurismäki
- Based on: The Clan by Tauno Kaukonen
- Starring: Markku Halme
- Cinematography: Timo Salminen
- Release date: 30 November 1984
- Running time: 95 minutes
- Country: Finland
- Language: Finnish

The Clan – Tale of the Frogs (Finnish: Klaani: Tarina Sammakoitten suvusta) is a 1984 Finnish drama film directed by Mika Kaurismäki. It is based on the 1963 novel The Clan by Tauno Kaukonen. The film was entered into the 14th Moscow International Film Festival.

== Cast ==
- Markku Halme as Aleksanteri Suuri Sammakko
- Minna Soisalo as Mirja Andersson
- Sakari Rouvinen as Roope Andersson
- Juhani Niemelä as Samuli Sammakko
- Antti Litja as Benjamin Sammakko
- Kari Väänänen as Leevi Sammakko
- Mikko Majanlahti as Pike Andersson
- Tuija Vuolle as Ulla Sammakko
- Soli Labbart as Saara-Muori Sammakko
- Eila Halonen as Raakel Sammakko
- Lasse Pöysti as Siilipää
