= Kari Väänänen =

Finnish actor and director (born 1953)

- Born: Kari Kyösti Väänänen; 17 September 1953 (age 72); Ivalo, Finland
- Occupations: Actor; director; writer
- Years active: 1978—present

Kari Kyösti Väänänen (born 17 September 1953 in Ivalo) is a Finnish actor and director. Domestically he is a member of the Ryhmäteatteri group of actors. He was introduced to international audiences by Aki Kaurismäki, and belongs to the list of his "trusted" stable of actors.

Väänänen has acted in more than 60 movies. He has received two Jussi awards, for best male actor in Jon (1983) and for best supporting male actor in Trench Road (2004). His performance as the monster Gollum in Yle's 1993 television series Hobitit was praised in Helsingin Sanomat.

In 1992–1998 Väänänen was a professor at the Helsinki Theatre Academy.

== Selected filmography ==
As actor

- Jon (1983)
- The Clan – Tale of the Frogs (1984)
- Calamari Union (1985)
- Rosso (1985)
- Helsinki Napoli All Night Long (1987)
- Leningrad Cowboys Go America (1989)
- Amazon (1990)
- Night on Earth (1991)
- La Vie de Bohème (1992)
- The Last Border (1993)
- Hobitit (1993)
- Ripa Hits the Skids (1993)
- Drifting Clouds (1996)
- Trains'n'Roses (1998)
- The Tough Ones (1999)
- Ambush (1999)
- Sincerely Yours in Cold Blood (10 episodes, 2000–2005)
- Bad Luck Love (2000)
- Trench Road (2004)
- Star Wreck: In the Pirkinning (2005)
- V2: Dead Angel (V2 – Jäätynyt enkeli, 2007)
- Joulutarina (2007)
- The House of Branching Love (Haarautuvan rakkauden talo, 2009)
- Master Cheng (Mestari Cheng, 2019)
- The Missile (Ohjus) - 2024

As director

- The Quiet Village (Vaiennut kylä, 1997)
- The Classic (Klassikko, 2001)
- Backwood Philosopher (Havukka-ahon ajattelija, 2009)
