= Beaches International Jazz Festival =

Music festival in Toronto, Canada

Coordinates: 43.66925°N 79.29835°W

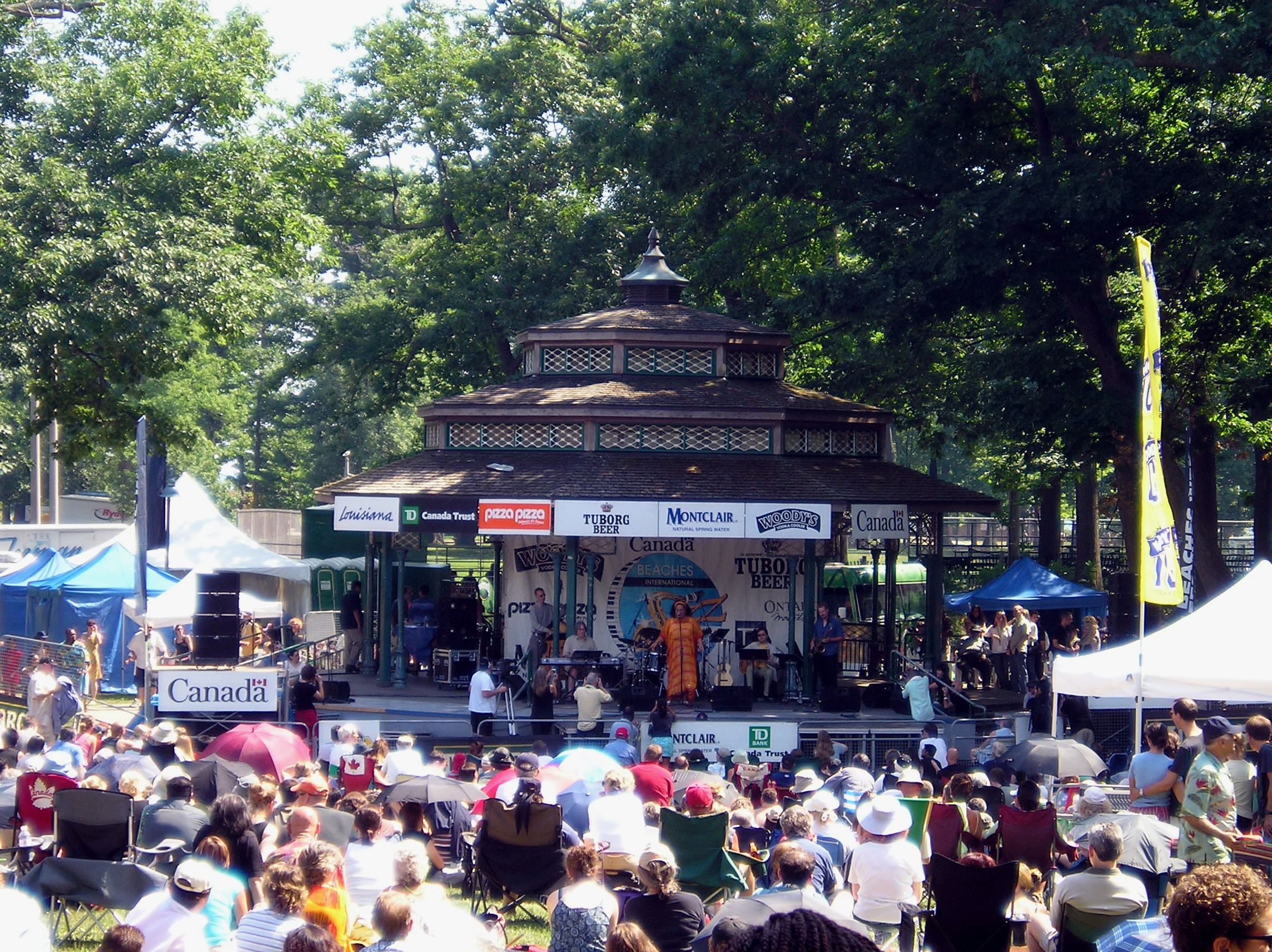
A performance at the 2005 Beaches International Jazz Festival

The Beaches International Jazz Festival is a month-long music festival held each year in the lakeside Beaches community of Toronto in July. Originally started in 1989, it is now one of Canada's largest free jazz festivals with nearly 1,000,000 attendees, throughout its month-long span.

The Festival takes place across a number of venues; stage concerts are held in several different parks within the area and also along a two kilometre stretch of the Beach mainstreet during StreetFest - Queen Street East.

In 2022, the Festival returned to a full program of live concerts following several years of both live and virtual events due to the COVID-19 pandemic.

== Programming and venues ==
Every year, the Festival brings in internationally acclaimed jazz performers while also showcasing local talent, including "new generation" jazz musicians. The Festival now hires around 1000 artists per annum, including 50 bands for its "StreetFest" event along Queen Street East. The Festival offers concerts at various locations: the Woodbine Park Main Stage, Jimmie Simpson Park Main Stage, Big Band Stage, SING! A capella Stage . The Festival holds a Workshop and Lecture Series which varies each year and is programmed to appeal to both professional musicians and to the general jazz loving public.

== Community support and funding ==
BIJF garners community support due to the community events it supports. These include: a "Jazz-Up Your Windows" Beach BIA - BIJF jointly sponsored contest for local retailers and multiple fundraising opportunities for local charities such as the "Beaches Jazz Tune-Up Run" on behalf of the Beach Rotary Club, Community Centre 55 and the Michael Garron Hospital. The BIJF benefits the local economy, injecting over $30 million into the GTA.

Although the festival is funded by the province's Ministry of Tourism and Culture, funding is also sourced from community donations. In November 2013, the Government of Canada donated $200,000 as part of the Department of Canadian Heritage funding program.
