= Brasileirinho =

1947 choro composed by Waldir Azevedo

Song
- Released: 1947
- Genre: Choro
- Composer(s): Waldir Azevedo

"Brasileirinho" (Little Brazilian) is a 1947 choro composed by Waldir Azevedo. It is considered one of the most successful and influential choros of all time; this standard has been covered by many artists, like singer Carmen Miranda, band Novos Baianos with guitarist Pepeu Gomes, and cellist Yo-Yo Ma (Obrigado Brazil). It was voted by the Brazilian edition of Rolling Stone as the 53rd greatest Brazilian song. The 2005 documentary Brasileirinho, about the choro genre, is named after the 1947 song.
