= Néstor Torres =

Puerto Rican musician (born 1957)

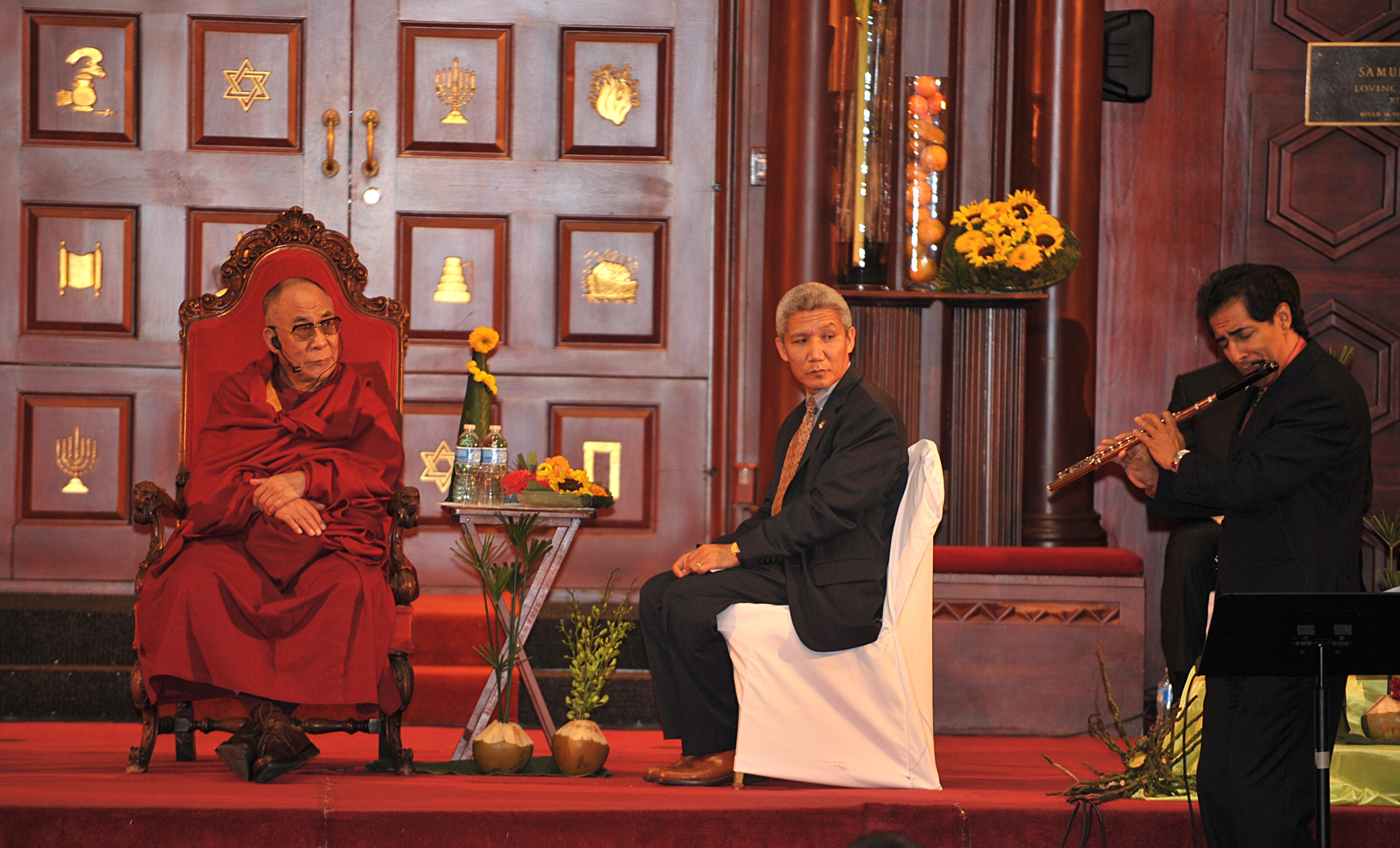
- Nestor Torres performing for the Dalai Lama at Temple Emanu-El (Miami Beach, Florida) in 2010

Background information
- Born: 25 April 1957 (age 68); Mayaguez, Puerto Rico
- Genres: Jazz, classical
- Instrument: Flute

Néstor Torres (born 25 April 1957) is a Puerto Rican jazz flautist, born in Mayaguez, Puerto Rico. He took flute lessons at age 12 and began formal studies at the Escuela Libre de Música, eventually attending Puerto Rico’s Inter-American University. At 18, he moved to New York with his family. Torres went on to study both jazz and classical music at the Mannes College of Music in New York and the New England Conservatory of Music in Boston, among other places. His CD This Side Of Paradise was awarded Best Pop Instrumental Album at the 2nd Annual Latin Grammy Awards in 2001.

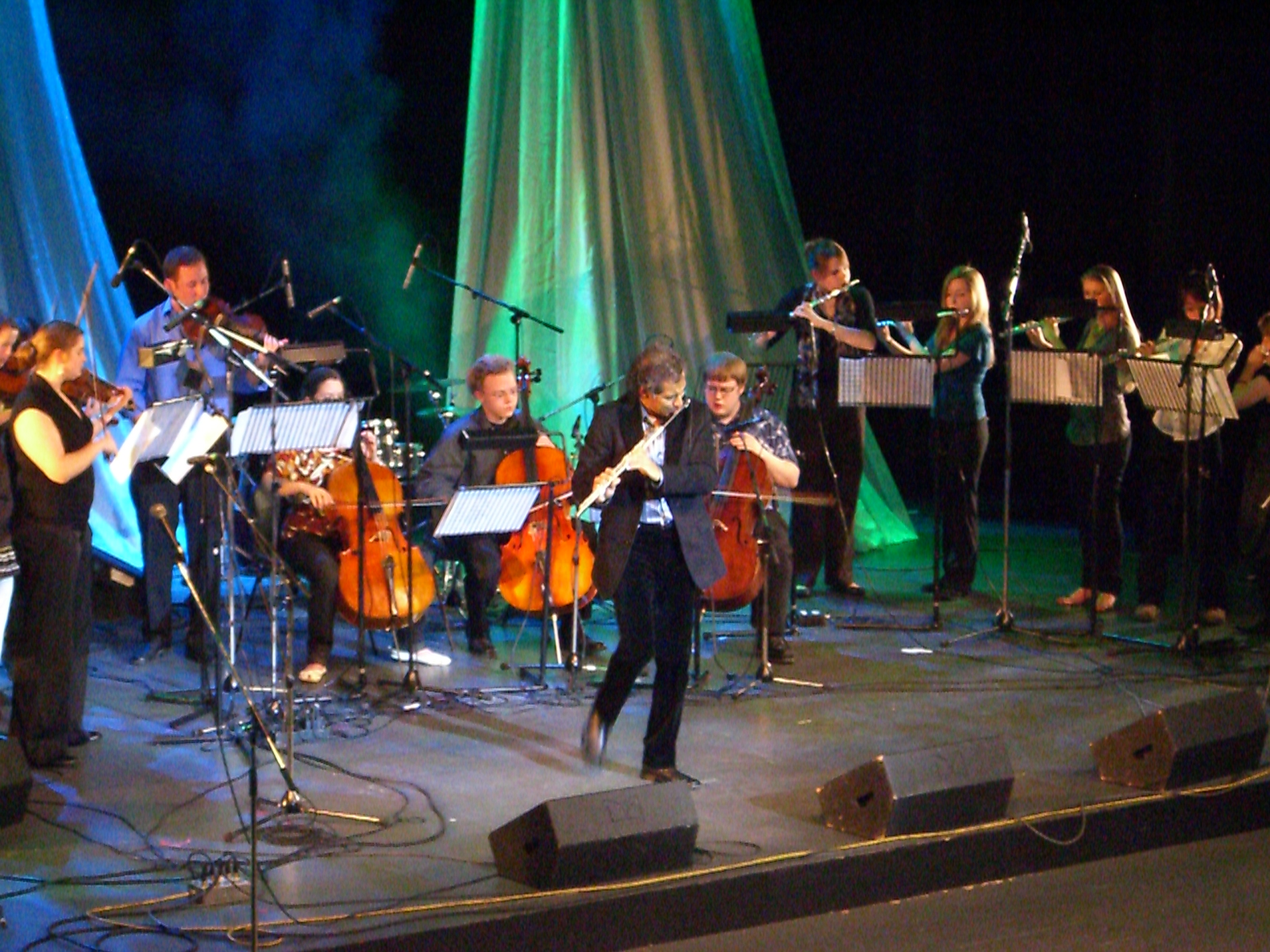
Nestor Torres playing at the World Music Concert 2007

Torres is also a practitioner of Nichiren Buddhism and a longtime member of the Buddhist association Soka Gakkai International.

In 2010, Torres joined the faculty of Florida International University as a visiting guest artist and founding director of its School of Music's first charanga ensemble.

== Albums ==
- Colombia En Charanga (1978)
- No Me Provoques (1981)
- Afro - Charanga Vol. 2 (1983)
- Morning Ride (1989)
- Dance of the Phoenix (1990)
- Burning Whispers (1994)
- Talk to Me (1996)
- Treasures of the Heart (1999)
- This Side of Paradise (2001)
- Mis Canciones Primeras (2001)
- Mi Alma Latina (2002)
- The Sutra of The Lotus of The Wonderful Law (2004)
- Sin Palabras (2004)
- Dances, Prayers & Meditations For Peace (2006)
- The Very Best Of Nestor Torres (2007)
- Nestor Torres - Nouveau Latino (2008)
- Del Caribe, Soy!: Latin American Flute Music (2017)
- Jazz Flute Traditions (2018)
- Dominican Suite (2022)
