= Brasileirinho (film) =

- Directed by: Mika Kaurismäki
- Release date: 2005

Brasileirinho (Note: It was released as "The Sound of Rio: Brasileirinho" in the U.S. and as "Brasileirinho - Grandes Encontros do Choro" (Portuguese for "Brasileirinho - Great Encounters of Choro") in Brazil.) is a 2005 musical documentary film by Finnish film director Mika Kaurismäki about traditional Brazilian choro music genre. The film showed at the 2005 Berlin International Film Festival. It is titled after the 1947 song, Brasileirinho.

The musical director is Marcello Gonçalves, an accomplished 7 string guitarist from Rio. He is well known internationally in the Choro community.
