= Mika Kaurismäki =

Finnish film director

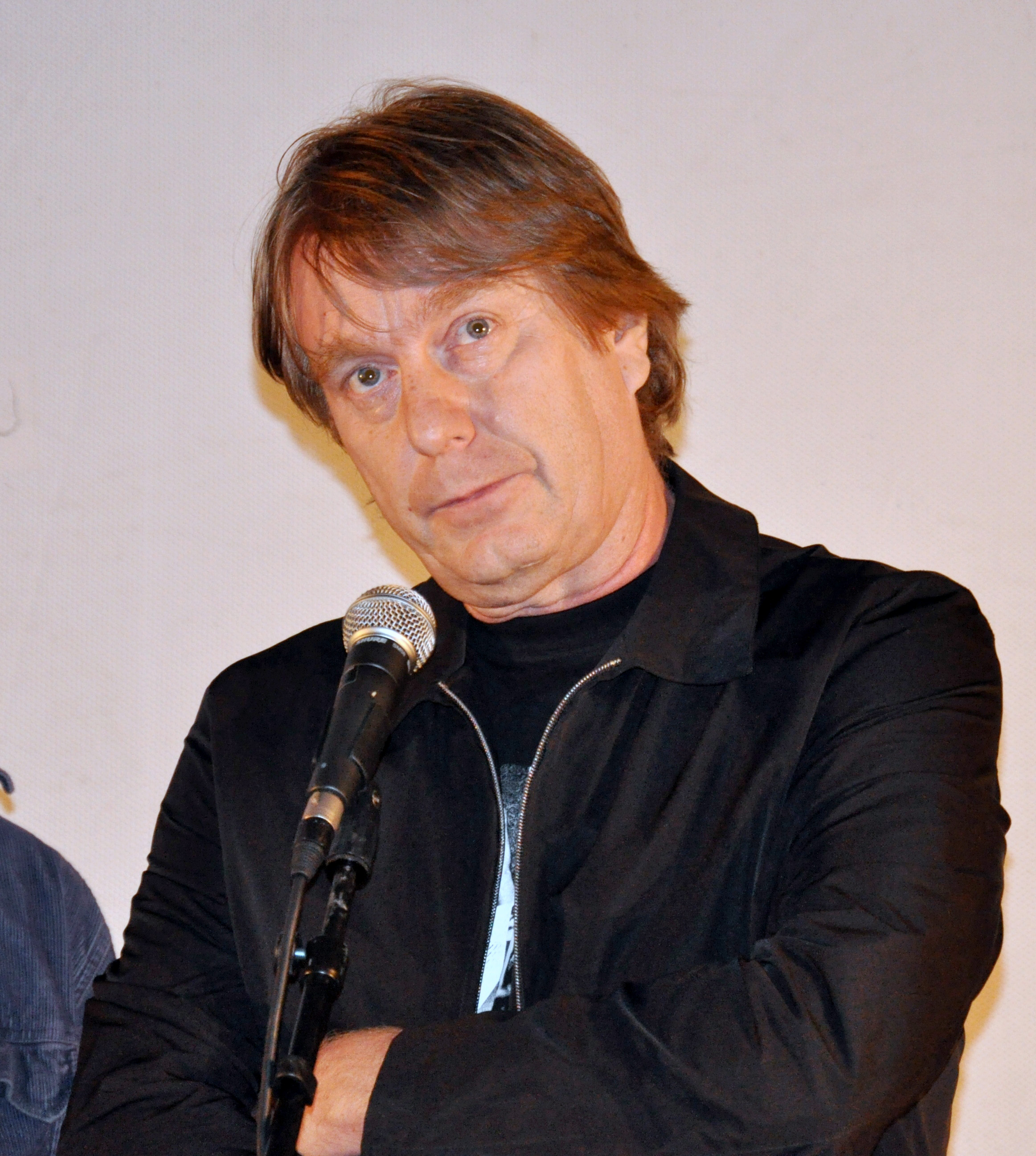
- Kaurismäki in 2009
- Born: 21 September 1955 (age 71); Orimattila, Finland
- Occupation: Film director
- Website: mikakaurismaki.com

Mika Juhani Kaurismäki (Finnish: [ˈmikɑ ˈkɑu̯rismæki]; born 21 September 1955) is a Finnish film director.

== Early life and education ==
Mika Kaurismäki was born in Orimattila. He is the elder brother of Aki Kaurismäki. After high school, Kaurismäki worked as a painter of houses and apartments in the small town of Kuusankoski in the southeastern part of Finland. In the autumn of 1976, when the winter was coming and the annual high season for painting houses was over, he thought of doing something else in life. Still wearing his painter overalls, he walked into a bookstore and bought the newly published History of Cinema by Peter von Bagh. He started reading it from page one and decided to become a film director.

== Career ==
Kaurismäki's first film, The Liar (1980), made in Finland, was his diplom film. His younger brother Aki Kaurismäki, then a student of journalism, played the main role and also co-wrote the screenplay. The Liar was an overnight sensation, when first shown in Finland; it marked the beginning of the Kaurismäki brothers' film career and started a new era in Finnish cinema. After the success of The Liar, Mika Kaurismäki decided to stay in Finland and together with his brother and some friends he founded the production company Villealfa Filmproductions, which soon became a home of vital low- or no-budget film making; by the end of the 1980s it was the third biggest film production company of all time in Finland. The Villealfa film family consisted of many colleagues and friends in addition to the Kaurismäki brothers, including the actors Matti Pellonpää and Kari Väänänen and the cinematographer Timo Salminen. Mika's 1984 film The Clan – Tale of the Frogs was entered into the 14th Moscow International Film Festival.

Aki Kaurismäki, who had worked as Mika's assistant and a screenwriter, began his career as a director when Mika produced his film Crime and Punishment (1984). During the active Villealfa years, Mika co-founded the Midnight Sun Film Festival (1986) and the distribution company Senso Films (1987), and the Andorra cinemas in Helsinki. The 1990s saw the gradual fading of the Villealfa spirit; Mika and Aki started to produce their films separately, through their own production companies. Mika had founded Marianna Films in 1987 and its first independent production was Zombie and the Ghost Train (1991).

Over the course of the 1990s, he established his base and second home in Rio de Janeiro, and started to concentrate more in international co-productions. He made several Brazilian-themed films, including Amazon, Tigrero, Sambólico, Rytmi, and Moro no Brasil. His film Brasileirinho is a 2005 musical documentary about traditional Brazilian choro music. In 1995 in Philadelphia he directed the no-budget thriller Condition Red with James Russo, Cynda Williams and Paul Calderón. Condition Red was entered into the 19th Moscow International Film Festival. His biggest production so far was L.A. Without a Map (1998).

During the production of Moro no Brasil (2002) Kaurismäki opened a live music club, Mika's Bar, in Rio de Janeiro, but gave it up later and decided to concentrate primarily on film making. In 2003 he was a member of the jury at the 25th Moscow International Film Festival.

On 24 August 2012, The Road North, starring Vesa-Matti Loiri and Samuli Edelmann, premiered in Finland, and has been a success with more than 200.000 viewers by the end of September 2012. Kaurismäki is the producer and co-writer of the 2012 documentary film The King – Jari Litmanen which tells about the career of Finnish footballer Jari Litmanen.

Gracious Night, starring Timo Torikka, Pertti Sveholm and Kari Heiskanen, premiered in 2020, in the Estonian Tallinn Black Nights Film Festival.

== Personal life ==
Kaurismäki is married to a Brazilian woman whose identity has not been disclosed. They have two children; their daughter, Maria, is also a filmmaker. The family lived in Brazil for nearly 30 years before moving to Lisbon in the mid-2010s. However, they left Portugal in 2019 and returned to Finland. Kaurismäki's brother Aki has also lived in Lisbon with his wife since 1989.

== Filmography ==
Kaurismäki has made films in several languages, most commonly English, Finnish and Portuguese. Below, the original titles of the movies are shown in parentheses.

- The Liar (Valehtelija) (1981)
- The Saimaa Gesture (1981) (co-directed with Aki Kaurismäki)
- Jackpot 2 (1982) (short film)
- The Worthless (Arvottomat) (1982)
- The Clan – Tale of the Frogs (Klaani – tarina Sammakoitten suvusta) (1984)
- Rosso (1985)
- Helsinki Napoli All Night Long (1987)
- Night Work (Yötyö) (1988) (TV film)
- Cha Cha Cha (1989)
- Paper Star (Paperitähti) (1989)
- Amazon (1990)
- Zombie and the Ghost Train (Zombie ja kummitusjuna) (1991)
- The Last Border (1993)
- Tigrero: A Film That Was Never Made (1994)
- Sambolico (1996)
- Condition Red (1995)
- Danish Girls Show Everything (Danske piger viser alt) (1996)
- L.A. Without a Map (1998)
- Highway Society (2000)
- Sound of Brazil (Moro No Brasil) (2002)
- Honey Baby (2003)
- Welcome to São Paulo (Bem-Vindo a São Paulo) (2004)
- Brasileirinho (2005)
- Sonic Mirror (2008)
- Three Wise Men (Kolme viisasta miestä) (2008)
- The House of Branching Love (Haarautuvan rakkauden talo) (2009)
- Mama Africa (2011)
- Brothers (Veljekset) (2012)
- Road North (Tie Pohjoiseen) (2012) – Mika Kaurismäki was awarded the Audience Prize for this film at the Saint Petersburg International Film Festival.
- The Girl King (2015)
- Master Cheng (Mestari Cheng) (2019)
- Gracious Night (Yö armahtaa) (2020)
- The Grump: In Search of an Escort (Mielensäpahoittaja Eskorttia etsimässä) (2022)
- Long Good Thursday (Mielensäpahoittajan rakkaustarina) (2024)
- Fuglar (og menn) (2026)
