= 79th Jussi Awards =

2025 Finnish film awards ceremony

- Date: 21 March 2025
- Site: Merikaapelihalli, Kaapelitehdas, Helsinki, Finland
- Hosted by: Gogi Mavromichalis
- Organized by: Filmiaura

Highlights
- Most awards: Stormskerry Maja (6)
- Most nominations: Sebastian and Stormskerry Maja (9)

Television coverage
- Channel: MTV3

The 79th annual Jussi Awards, presented by Filmiaura, honoring the achievement in Finnish cinema in 2024, took place on 21 March 2025 at the Merikaapelihalli at Kaapelitehdas in Helsinki. The ceremony was hosted by presenter Gogi Mavromichalis. Three categories were first awarded in this ceremony: Best Ensemble, Best Breakthrough Performance, and Best Visual Effects.

Historical drama film Stormskerry Maja won the most awards of the ceremony with six, including Best Film. Other winners included Apple Thieves, The Missile, My Name Is Dingo, and Once Upon a Time in a Forest with two, Fish River Anthology, Shadowland, and Snot and Splash with one.

== Winners and nominees ==
The nominations were announced on 30 January 2025. Drama film Sebastian and historical drama film Stormskerry Maja received the most nominations with nine each, followed by comedy film Apple Thieves with six.

Winners are listed first, highlighted in boldface, and indicated with a double-dagger (‡).

**Best Film**: **Stormskerry Maja – Jukka Helle, Hanna Virolainen, and Markus Selin**‡; Apple Thieves – Samppa Batal and Tuomas Kohtamäki; The Missile – Daniel Kuitunen and Kaisla Viitala; Niko: Beyond the Northern Lights – Antti Haikala and Hannu Tuomainen; Sebastian – James Watson	**Best Director**: **Tiina Lymi – Stormskerry Maja**‡; Mikko Mäkelä – Sebastian; Samppa Batal – Apple Thieves
**Best Leading Performance**: **Amanda Jansson – Stormskerry Maja as Maja**‡; Joel Hirvonen – Apple Thieves as Sebastian; Ruaridh Mollica – Sebastian as Max Williamson	**Best Supporting Performance**: **Satu Tuuli Karhu – Apple Thieves as Satu**‡; Jonathan Hyde – Sebastian as Nicholas; Linus Troedsson – Stormskerry Maja as Janne
**Best Breakthrough Performance**: **Saku Taittonen – My Name Is Dingo as Pertti Neumann**‡; Aksa Korttila – Butterflies as Siiri; Elias Westerberg – After Us, the Flood as Markku	**Best Ensemble**: **Apple Thieves – Joel Hirvonen, Satu Tuuli Karhu, Antti Autio, Sami Lalou, Alex Anton, Isla Mustanoja, Esa-Matti Smolander, Asta Sveholm, and Mikko Kouki**‡; Long Good Thursday – Heikki Kinnunen and Jaana Saarinen; Luottomies-elokuva: All In – Antti Luusuaniemi, Kari Ketonen, and Maria Ylipää
**Best Screenplay**: **The Missile – Miia Tervo**‡; Apple Thieves – Samppa Batal; Sebastian – Mikko Mäkelä	**Best Cinematography**: **Once Upon a Time in a Forest – Teemu Liakka**‡; Sebastian – Ilkka Salminen; Stormskerry Maja – Rauno Ronkainen
**Best Editing**: **Stormskerry Maja – Joona Louhivuori**‡; My Name Is Dingo – Hanna Kuirinlahti; Sebastian – Arttu Salmi and Mikko Mäkelä	**Best Production Design**: **Stormskerry Maja – Otso Linnalaakso**‡; The Missile – Heather Loeffler; Snot and Splash – Santtu Toivola
**Best Costume Design**: **The Missile – Kirsi Gum**‡; Sebastian – Frank Gallacher; Snot and Splash – Anna Vilppunen	**Best Makeup**: **My Name Is Dingo – Nora Pippingsköld**‡; The Missile – Kaire Hendrikson; Prisons – Isa Koskelainen, Minja Tuomisalo, and Johanna Tuominen
**Best Original Score**: **Stormskerry Maja – Lauri Porra**‡; Once Upon a Time in a Forest – Sanna Salmenkallio; Sebastian – Ilari Heinilä	**Best Sound Design**: **Shadowland – Svante Colérus**‡; Once Upon a Time in a Forest – Olli Huhtanen; Stormskerry Maja – Kirka Sainio
**Best Documentary Film**: **Once Upon a Time in a Forest – Virpi Suutari and Martti Suosalo**‡; Hard to Break – Anna-Maija Heinonen, Krista Moisio, and Oskar Forstén; Pepe – Severi Koivusalo and Aleksi Bardy	**Best Short Film**: **Fish River Anthology – Veera Lamminpää**‡; Fabulous Cow Ladies – Miia Halme; Pantyhose – Fabian Munsterhjelm
**Best Visual Effects**: **Snot and Splash – Tuomo Hintikka**‡; After Us, the Flood – Vesa Jokinen; Niko: Beyond the Northern Lights – Ville Nevalainen	**People's Choice**: **Stormskerry Maja by Tiina Lymi**‡
**Lifetime Achievement Award**: **Reijo Kontio**

=== Films with multiple nominations and awards ===
Films that received multiple nominations
Nominations	Film
9	Sebastian
9	Stormskerry Maja
6	Apple Thieves
5	The Missile
4	Once Upon a Time in a Forest
3	My Name Is Dingo
3	Snot and Splash
2	After Us, the Flood
2	Niko: Beyond the Northern Lights

Films that received multiple awards
Awards	Film
6	Stormskerry Maja
2	Apple Thieves
2	The Missile
2	My Name Is Dingo
2	Once Upon a Time in a Forest
