= The Grump (fictional character) =

- Created by: Tuomas Kyrö

In-universe information
- Full name: Mielensäpahoittaja
- Nationality: Finnish

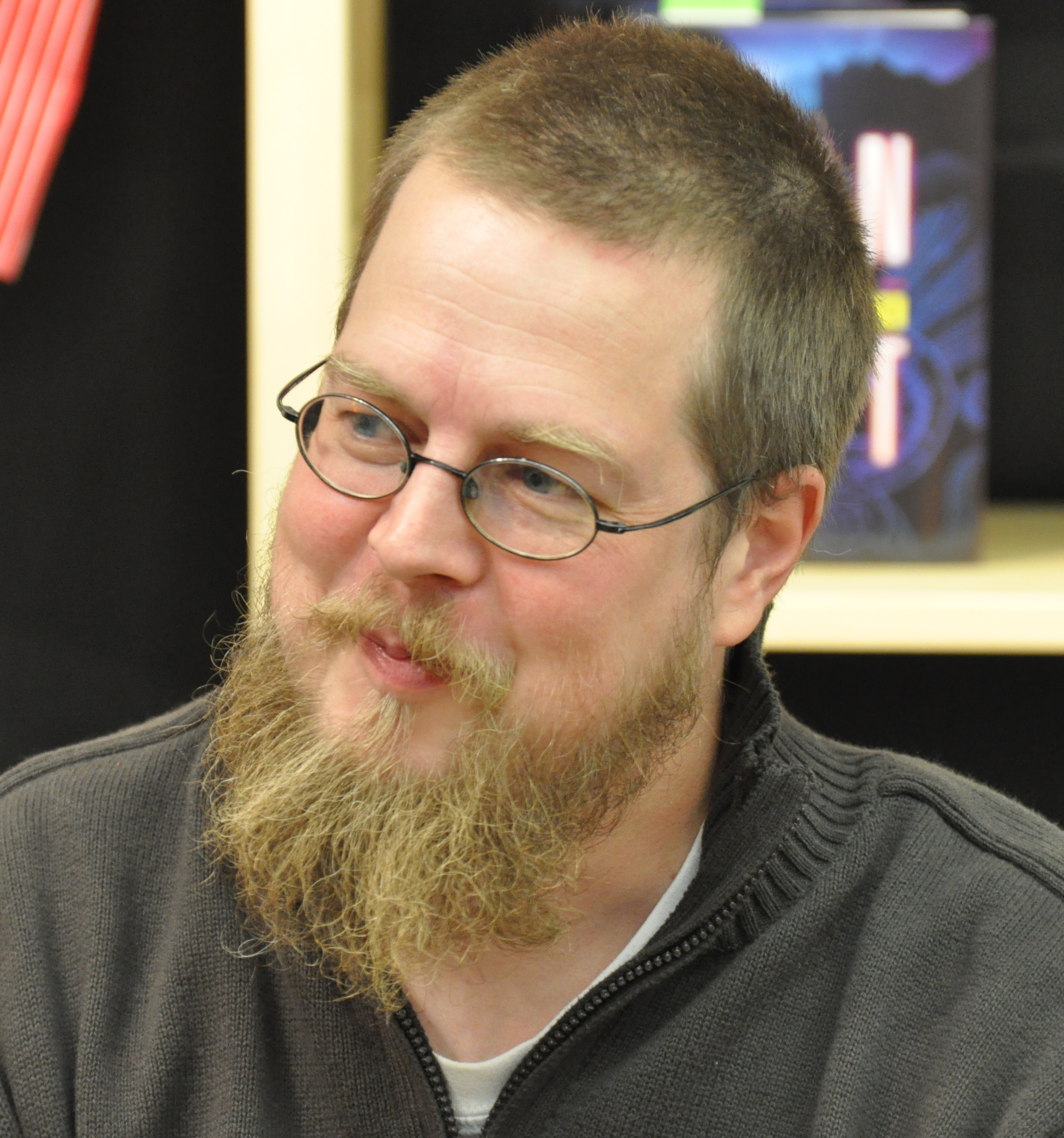
Kyrö in 2011

The Grump (Finnish: Mielensäpahoittaja 'a person who always gets upset') is a fictional character created by the Finnish author Tuomas Kyrö for a causerie series. Four films have been made about the character.

== Personality and whereabouts ==
The Grump is a man who writes letters-to-the-editor for various newspapers, full of complaints about all things imaginable. He basically has the attitude that "everyone is entitled to my opinion." Mielensäpahoittaja is a cranky old man of roughly 80 years of age, and he is from Häme, as his dialect is a variant of the Tavastian dialects. He lives in the countryside, termed Sysi-Suomi, which is an ironic portmanteau of various hyphenated Finlands (e.g. Sisä-Suomi 'Inner Finland') and sysimusta 'pitch-black'; cf. "Dark Continent". Originally his complaints were heard on the Finnish radio, interpreted by actor Antti Litja. Later his writings have been published in Finnish in three books and also in Helsingin Sanomat from the Christmas of 2010 until the summer of 2012. The letters read by Antti Litja are available on CDs.

His home is somewhere to the west of Lake Päijänne, more or less equidistant from the nearest cities and towns, which appear to be Lahti, Tampere and Jyväskylä, at 300 kilometers from Helsinki, although that would place him slightly to the north of Jyväskylä and into the area of the Savo dialects, which is clearly not where he lives. In his dialect, /d/ (which in standard Finnish, both written and spoken, is the weak grade of /t/) is replaced by /r/, such as in the word "rikdaattori", in which, however, one can also notice a hypercorrect /d/.

== Language ==
The language used by Mielensäpahoittaja is characterised by a creative use of the Finnish word "kyllä" ('yes'), such as in the opening phrase of virtually all of his contributions, "Kyllä minä niin mieleni pahoitin…" ('I certainly got myself upset and all worked up...'), and in expressions such as "kyllä en" ('I certainly don't') tai "kyllä ei/kyllä ei ole/kyllä ei ollut" ('it certainly is not/was not'), where the word kyllä is virtually impossible to translate. It is not used to express the affirmative, but rather as an intensifier.

== The first complaint ==
Mielensäpahoittaja began his complaints when his doctor had told him he had to change the way he lived, meaning chiefly his diet. However, against his doctor's advice he made no changes to his diet, but instead got into "an honest habit of complaining", and upon asking himself "if my levels are where they ought to be?" he answered "Well, they certainly are."

== Family and friends ==
At first the people who had to listen to his complaints were his missus and his only friend, Yrjänä (a Finnish variant of the name George). Now he lives alone in his home, because the missus lies in a ward in the community health center and will never be able to come home again. He has no friends, since his only friend Yrjänä is dead, "…and there's nothing wrong about wondering if I had any other friends. Well, I certainly didn't, since it was clear I never needed another friend," he says. Since he has no one at or near his home to listen to his complaints, he has to do with writing letters to the editor, to various newspapers about which no details are given (apart from the stories that appeared in Helsingin Sanomat during 2010–2012).

He has a son and a daughter-in-law who live in a city 300 kilometers away (most probably in Helsinki), but he does not really get along with them. It happens for example, that "I certainly got myself upset and all worked up when my son invited me to his place for Christmas." The daughter-in-law does not have a proper respect for the potato, and she causes the father-in-law to get upset by serving turkey for the main Christmas meal, instead of Christmas ham.

== Complaints about domestic and world events ==
Mielensäpahoittaja gets upset about things in everyday life as well as domestic and world events. He has devoted several pieces to the Swedish Royal House and monarchy in general, and the dictators of North Korea have had their share of his criticism.

When it comes to things in his native Finland, he believes that for paying the television licence fee, he is entitled to seeing Finnish athletes winning Olympic gold medals. Concerning the year 1972 and the Summer Olympics in Munich, he says, "That was when the TV licence fee still worked. Lasse Virén and Pekka Vasala both won." His favourite programmes on the TV would be provincial relay races in cross-country skiing, if they were broadcast, as he says was the case in the 1960s. Of the people in power he criticises the Finnish Prime Minister, who has told his fellow countrymen not to give money to beggars. "The very same man who never runs out of tarts and baked potatoes." Likewise he criticises the Finnish members of parliament and members of the municipal councils, because they have decided that people of his age are exempt from the upcoming reform concerning sewage in the countryside. "You people in politics and in our municipal administration, are you so stupid that you think that everyone over 68 years of age is lacking of means?" He does not necessarily reject modern introductions to Finnish life, such as mobile phones, pizza or Thai brides, but views them through his own practical (if antiquated) mindset.

== Books in English ==
- Meet the Grump. Helsinki: WSOY, 2017. 233 pages. ISBN 978-951-0-43056-9 (hardcover).
- Happy Days of the Grump. Helsinki: WSOY, 2017. 233 pages. ISBN 978-1-78658-026-9 (paperback).

== Books in Finnish ==
- Mielensäpahoittaja. Helsinki: WSOY, 2010. 130 pages. ISBN 978-951-0-36626-4 (hardcover).
- Mielensäpahoittaja ja ruskeakastike. Helsinki: WSOY, 2012. 130 pages. ISBN 978-951-0-39079-5 (hardcover).
- Iloisia aikoja, Mielensäpahoittaja. Helsinki: WSOY, 2014. 252 pages. ISBN 978-951-0-40762-2 (hardcover).

== Films ==
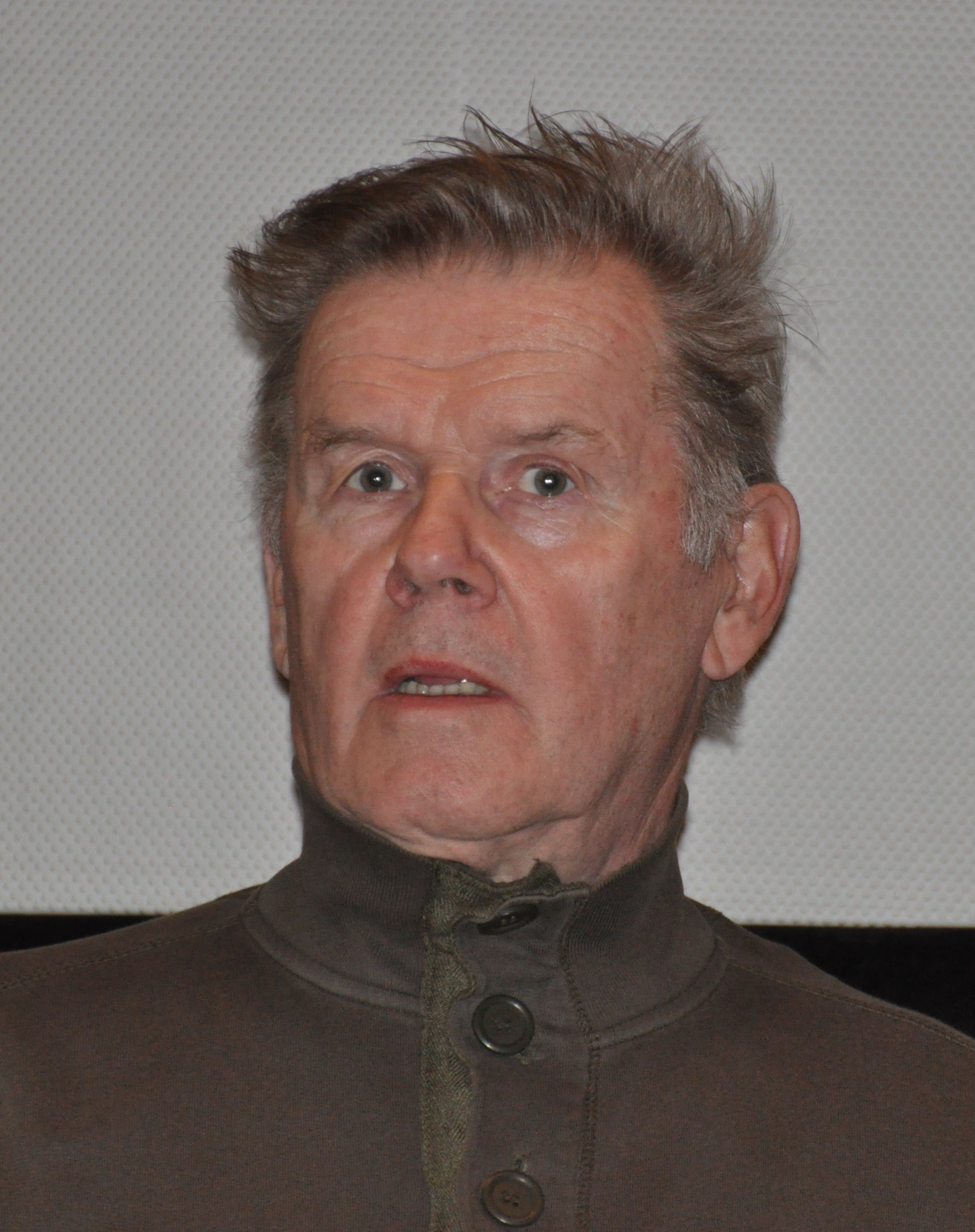
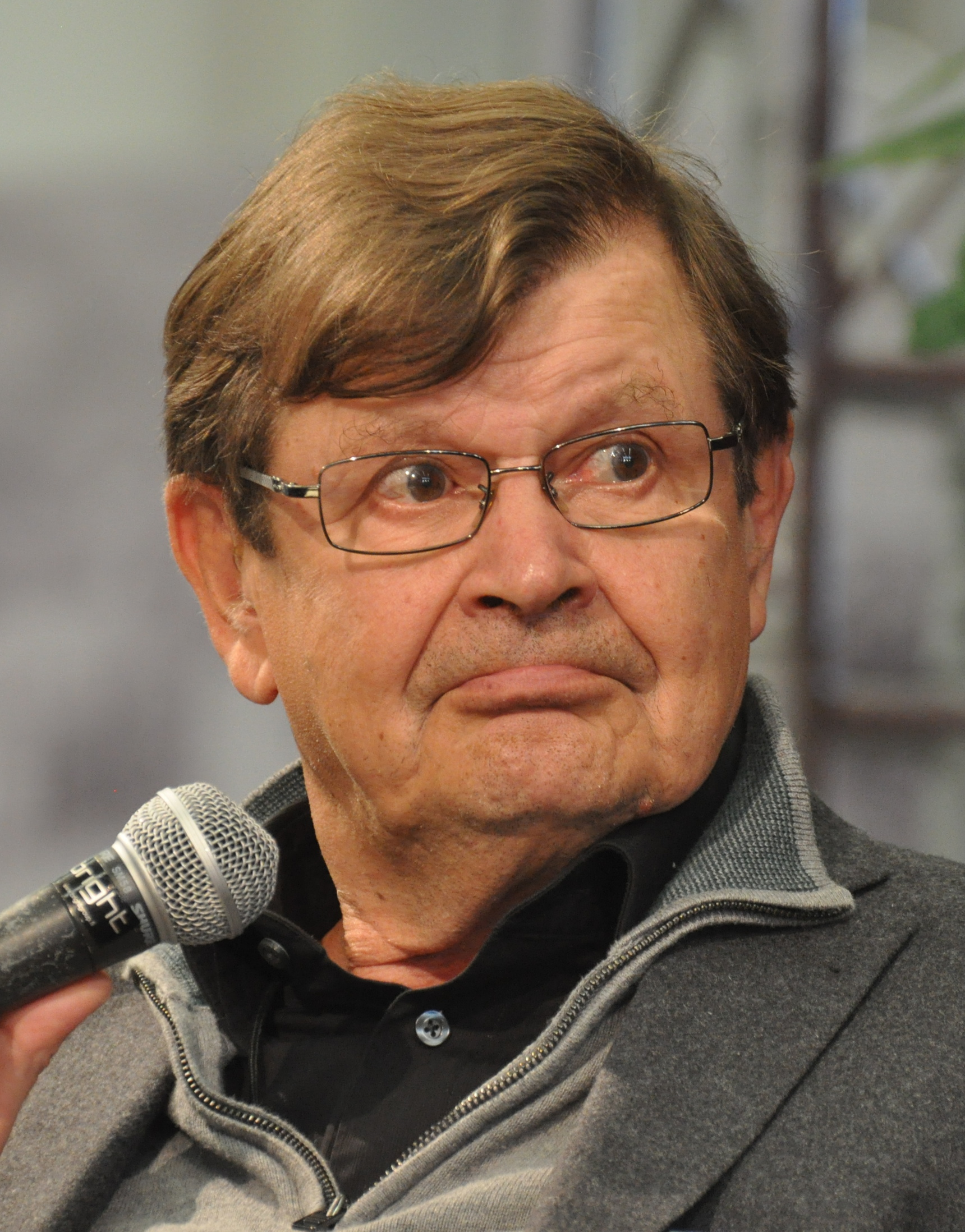
Actor Antti Litja (left) played the Grump in the first film, while Heikki Kinnunen played the role in the three sequels.
- The Grump (2014)
- Happier Times, Grump (2018)
- The Grump: In Search of an Escort (2022)
- Long Good Thursday (2024)
