= Queen of Fucking Everything =

Finnish TV series

- Country of origin: Finland
- Original language: Finnish
- No. of seasons: 1
- No. of episodes: 6

Production
- Production company: Rabbit Films

Original release
- Network: Yle Areena; Yle TV1
- Release: 1 January 2025 – present

Queen of Fucking Everything is a 2025 Finnish comedy drama TV series created, written, and directed by Tiina Lymi and starring Laura Malmivaara, Katja Küttner, and Minna Haapkylä. When broadcast by Finnish public broacaster Yle, the number of viewers broke previous records, and the series has been sold and broadcast around the world. It won five Golden Venla awards and Best Director in the Venice TV Awards, and was nominated for the 2026 Nordic Script Award.

== Synopsis ==
Set in Helsinki, a wealthy woman takes to a life of crime after her husband leaves her in 3 million Euros worth of debt.

== Cast ==
- Laura Malmivaara as Linda Saarniluoto
- Katja Küttner as Marke Tapola
- Joonas Heikkinen as Spora
- Minna Haapkylä as Anna
- Kari Heiskanen as Lars
- Miro Lopperi as Jouni Koistinen
- Janne Reinikainen as Lauri Purola
- Marja Packalén as Kristiina
- Juho Milonoff as Homeless man/Spurgu
- Jussi Nikkilä as Mikael Schoulten
- Ella Lymi as Johanna
- Chike Ohanwe as Jonne
- Samppa Batal as Erkki
- Eeva Mäkinen as Nurse/Hoitokodin hoitaja
- Amira Rchidi as Jemika
- Kristo Salminen as Börje Stenberg

== Production ==
The series was commissioned by Finnish national broadcaster YLE, was sold to channels across Europe before its global premiere at Content London, including ZDF (Germany), NPO (Netherlands), VRT (Belgium), NRK (Norway), and RÚV (Iceland).

Creator, writer, and director Tiina Lymi said that the idea for the series, which follows a wealthy woman who is drawn into a life of crime after her husband has gone missing and she finds herself in debt, had arisen from a personal experience she had had years before, leading her to "think about the justification of your own anger, disappointment or bitterness". The series was produced by Minna Haapkylä, Tiina-Mari Pitkänen, and Olli Suominen through Rabbit Films. The series has six episodes of 50 minutes each.

Janne Reinikainen was called in to replace Tommi Korpela, who had originally been cast in the role of Lauri Purola, a couple of days before shooting began. The series was shot in Helsinki and Spain.

As of 2026, there is a second season of the series under development. In January 2026, Lymi was working on the development of a feature film based on one of the characters in Queen of Fucking Everything, with the ironic title King of Fucking Everything, having co-written the script with Juha Lehtola of East Film.

== Broadcast ==
The series was sold to channels across Europe before its global premiere at global TV and film market Content London, including ZDF (Germany), NPO (Netherlands), VRT (Belgium), NRK (Norway), and RÚV (Iceland).

It premiered on YLE on 1 January 2025. It went on to be screened on other channels and streaming services around the world, including Rialto Channel in New Zealand, SBS on Demand in Australia, and Apple TV.

== Reception ==
Queen of Fucking Everything attracted record numbers of viewers on both its live broadcast and streaming platform, Yle Areena. The first episode broadcast on TV was viewed by 1,017,000 people, and there were 4 million unique starts for all of the episodes across Yle Areena (in a country of 5 million inhabitants) in its first week, and 10 million a year later.

The series has been described as "Finnish female version of Breaking Bad, albeit with a more satirical edge".

== Accolades ==
Queen of Fucking Everything won five awards in the Golden Venla TV awards in the 2025 edition: Drama Series of the Year; Manuscript of the Year (Fiction); Director of the Year (Fiction); Lead Actor of the Year (Laura Malmivaara); and Supporting Actor of the Year (Kristo Salminen).

The series also won Best Director in the Venice TV Awards, and was nominated for the 2026 Nordic Script Award.
