= The Grump: In Search of an Escort =

- Directed by: Mika Kaurismäki
- Written by: Daniela Hakulinen; Tuomas Kyrö
- Produced by: Jukka Helle; Maria Kaurismäki; Sophie Mahlo; Raoul B. Reinert; Markus Selin; Hanna Virolainen; Ingvar Þórðarson
- Starring: Heikki Kinnunen; Kari Väänänen; Silu Seppälä; Iikka Forss
- Cinematography: Jari Mutikainen
- Music by: Anssi Tikanmäki
- Production company: Solar Films
- Distributed by: Nordisk Film
- Release date: September 9, 2022 (Finland)
- Country: Finland
- Language: Finnish

The Grump: In Search of an Escort (Finnish: Mielensäpahoittaja Eskorttia etsimässä) is a 2022 Finnish comedy film and road movie directed by Mika Kaurismäki. It is the third installment in the Grump film series, following The Grump (2014) and Happier Times, Grump (2018).

The film follows the titular character, portrayed by Heikki Kinnunen, as he travels to Germany in search of a specific model of Ford Escort.

Aake Kalliala was originally cast to play The Grump’s brother Tarmo, and filming had progressed halfway with him in the role. However, Kalliala suffered a serious accident during production and was replaced by Kari Väänänen.

The film premiered in Germany in November 2022 under the title Grump – Auf der Suche nach dem Escort and in Iceland in March 2023 with the English title The Grump: In Search of an Escort.

In Finland, the film was the third most-watched film of 2022, with 192,689 admissions.

== Sequel ==
The sequel titled Long Good Thursday was released in 2024.

== Distribution ==
This film was broadcast on the French television channel Arte.

== Cast ==
- Heikki Kinnunen as The Grump
- Kari Väänänen as Tarmo
- Iikka Forss as Hessu
- Ville Tiihonen as Pekka
- Tiina Lymi as Katri
- Mari Perankoski as Daughter-in-law
- Silu Seppälä as Kolehmainen
- Rosalie Thomass as Maria
- Samu Haber as Otto
