= Grump =

Grump or The Grump may refer to:

- A grumpy person.
- The Grump, a 2014 Finnish comedy film featuring the fictional character
- The Grump (fictional character), a fictional Finnish literary character created by Tuomas Kyrö
- "The Grump", a nickname of Bill Jenkins (drag racer) (1930–2012), American engine builder and drag racer
- The nasty title-character in the American cartoon Here Comes the Grump, voiced by Rip Taylor

== See also ==
- Grumpy (disambiguation)
- Game Grumps, a Let's Play webseries
