= The Grump =

- Film poster
- Finnish: Mielensäpahoittaja
- Directed by: Dome Karukoski
- Written by: Dome Karukoski; Tuomas Kyrö
- Based on: Mielensäpahoittaja by Tuomas Kyrö
- Produced by: Jukka Helle; Markus Selin
- Starring: Antti Litja; Petra Frey; Mari Perankoski; Iikka Forss
- Cinematography: Pini Hellstedt
- Edited by: Harri Ylönen
- Music by: Hilmar Örn Hilmarsson
- Production company: Solar Films
- Release dates: 31 August 2014 (TIFF); 5 September 2014 (Finland)
- Running time: 104 minutes
- Country: Finland
- Languages: Finnish; Russian; English

The Grump (Finnish: Mielensäpahoittaja) is a 2014 Finnish comedy film directed by Dome Karukoski, in which the main character is The Grump, a cranky old man, created by the Finnish author Tuomas Kyrö.

The Grump was selected to compete for the Contemporary World Cinema section at the 2014 Toronto International Film Festival. It is based on a 2014 novel by Kyrö, the third volume by the author, in which this character appears.

The film stars Antti Litja as Mielensäpahoittaja a.k.a. the Grump, Petra Frey, Mari Perankoski, and Iikka Forss.

== Plot ==
The film tells the story about a stubbornly traditional eighty-year-old farmer — whose social attitudes verge on the prehistoric — raises hell when he is forced to move in with his sadsack, city-dwelling son and successful daughter-in-law.

== Cast ==
- Antti Litja as the Grump (a.k.a. Mielensäpahoittaja)
- Petra Frey as his missus
- Mari Perankoski as the daughter-in-law
- Iikka Forss as the Grump's son
- Viktor Drevitski as Sergei
- Kari Ketonen as Sakke Intonen
- Mikko Neuvonen as Stinde
- Bruno Puolakainen as Tarasenko
- Janne Reinikainen as Dr. Kiminkinen
- Alina Tomnikov as Ldujmila

== Reception ==
On review aggregator website Rotten Tomatoes, the film holds an approval rating of 100% based on 7 reviews.

== Sequels ==
The Grump film series continued with the 2018 release of Happier Times, Grump, directed by Tiina Lymi. In this installment, Heikki Kinnunen replaced Antti Litja in the lead role due to Litja's illness and retirement.

Kinnunen reprised his role in the 2022 film The Grump: In Search of an Escort, directed by Mika Kaurismäki and also in Long Good Thursday.
