= The Human Part =

2018 Finnish drama comedy film

- Directed by: Juha Lehtola
- Written by: Kari Hotakainen; Juha Lehtola
- Produced by: Misha Jaari; Mark Lwoff
- Starring: Hannu-Pekka Björkman; Armi Toivanen; Ria Kataja; Asko Sarkola; Leena Uotila; Kari Hietalahti; Della McLoud; Nicole Stiles
- Edited by: Samu Heikkilä
- Music by: Halfdan E
- Production company: Bufo
- Release date: 10 November 2018
- Running time: 108 minutes
- Countries: Finland, Denmark
- Language: Finnish
- Budget: €1,400,000

The Human Part (Finnish: Ihmisen osa) is a Finnish drama-comedy film directed by Juha Lehtola. The film premiered in Tallinn Black Nights Film Festival, and received its local premiere in Finland on 21 December 2018. The film is inspired by Kari Hotakainen's novel of the same name. The film was written by Kari Hotakainen and Juha Lehtola. Leo Viirret worked on script adaptation and dramaturgy in the film.

== Plot ==
Pekka Malmikunnas is a bankrupt man, who has convinced his family that he is still the CEO of a large IT company. Maintaining this facade has become a full-time job for him.

When Pekka’s parents Salme and Paavo come to the city for an unexpected visit, Pekka is in trouble. In order to dispel any doubts, Pekka throws his parents and his grown-up sisters a lavish dinner party. There they bump into Kimmo Hienlahti an even bigger smooth talker, who finally makes Pekka realize his own impossible situation. But what can Pekka do, when telling the truth is now harder than ever?

== Cast ==
- Hannu-Pekka Björkman as Pekka Malmikunnas
- Asko Sarkola as Paavo Malmikunnas
- Armi Toivanen as Maija Malmikunnas
- Ria Kataja as Helena Malmikunnas
- Leena Uotila as Salme Malmikunnas
- Kari Hietalahti as Kimmo Hienlahti

== Production ==
The film was shot in Uusimaa in October-December 2017. The film's budget was EUR 1.4 million.
