= Trench Road =

2004 film

- Directed by: Veikko Aaltonen
- Screenplay by: Veikko Aaltonen
- Based on: Juoksuhaudantie by Kari Hotakainen
- Produced by: Lasse Saarinen
- Starring: Eero Aho; Tiina Lymi
- Cinematography: Pekka Uotila
- Edited by: Kimmo Kohtamäki
- Music by: Mauri Sumén
- Production company: Kinotar
- Distributed by: FS Film
- Release dates: 16 May 2004 (Cannes Film Market); 27 August 2004 (Finland)
- Running time: 113 minutes
- Country: Finland
- Language: Finnish
- Budget: €1.1 million
- Box office: €774,340

Trench Road (Finnish: Juoksuhaudantie) is a 2004 Finnish drama film directed by Veikko Aaltonen. Based on the Nordic Council's Literature Prize-winning novel Juoksuhaudantie by Kari Hotakainen, the film is about a man who tries to get his wife and daughter back by buying a house.

Kari Väänänen won the Jussi Award for Best Supporting Actor for his role as the real estate agent Jarmo Kesämaa. Eero Aho and Tiina Lymi were nominated for Jussi Awards for Best Actor and Best Actress.

== Cast ==
- Eero Aho as Matti Virtanen
- Tiina Lymi as Helena Virtanen
- Ella Aho as Sini Virtanen
- Kari Väänänen as Jarmo Kesämaa
- Esko Pesonen as Taisto Oksanen
- Aake Kalliala as the foreman Siikavire
- Eeva Litmanen as Senior Constable Kalliolahti
- Matleena Kuusniemi as Sirkku
- Kaija Pakarinen as Merja Kesämaa
- Katariina Kaitue as Riitta Laakio
- Eila Roine as Martta Oksanen
