= The Unknown Kimi Raikkonen =

Biography on Kimi Räikkönen written by Kari Hotakainen

- First edition (Finnish)
- Author: Kari Hotakainen
- Original title: Tuntematon Kimi Räikkönen
- Published: 18 October 2018
- Publisher: Siltala (Finland); Simon & Schuster (UK)
- Pages: 336
- ISBN: 9781471177668

The Unknown Kimi Raikkonen (Finnish: Tuntematon Kimi Räikkönen) is an authorised biography on Finnish racing driver Kimi Räikkönen by Kari Hotakainen. Its English translation was published on 18 October 2018 to high expectations, being a projected bestseller by Ian Marshall of Simon & Schuster.
