= Happier Times, Grump =

- Finnish: Ilosia aikoja, Mielensäpahoittaja
- Directed by: Tiina Lymi
- Written by: Tiina Lymi; Tuomas Kyrö; Juha Lehtola
- Based on: Ilosia aikoja, Mielensäpahoittaja by Tuomas Kyrö
- Produced by: Markus Selin; Jukka Helle
- Starring: Heikki Kinnunen; Satu Tuuli Karhu; Sulevi Peltola
- Production company: Solar Films
- Distributed by: Nordisk Film
- Release date: 24 August 2018
- Running time: 118 minutes
- Country: Finland
- Language: Finnish

Happier Times, Grump (Finnish: Ilosia aikoja, Mielensäpahoittaja) is a 2018 Finnish film directed by Tiina Lymi, based on the 2014 novel of the same name by Tuomas Kyrö. The screenplay was written by Tiina Lymi, Tuomas Kyrö, and Juha Lehtola. The film stars Heikki Kinnunen in the role of "The Grump," replacing Antti Litja from the previous film due to Litja's illness.

Satu Tuuli Karhu won the Jussi Award for Best Supporting Actress for her role in the film. The film also received four Jussi Award nominations, including Best Film, Best Direction (Lymi), Best Actor (Kinnunen), and Best Screenplay.

The film was the most-watched domestic release in Finnish cinemas in 2018 and the second-most popular film overall, following Mamma Mia! Here We Go Again. Its television premiere was on January 2, 2021.

== Cast ==
- Heikki Kinnunen as The Grump
- Satu Tuuli Karhu as Sofia
- Sulevi Peltola as Kolehmainen
- Elina Knihtilä as Katri
- Jani Volanen as Pekka
- Iikka Forss as Hessu
- Mari Perankoski as Daughter-in-law
- Janne Reinikainen as Dr. Kivinkinen
- Kaisa Hela as Doctor
- Sari Siikander as Nursing home director
- Seppo Soittila as Accordionist

== Reception ==
Episodi magazine gave the film 4 out of 5 stars, praising its grounded storytelling and humor. Critic Jesse Raatikainen remarked that the film "captures its subject well, with a cozy atmosphere of coffee and buns without striving for grandeur or international appeal."

Other reviews were mixed, with some praising its emotional depth and others finding it less compelling compared to its predecessor. Etelä-Suomen Sanomat gave it 5 out of 5 stars, calling it "a five-star film that brings tears to your eyes."

== Sequel ==
In 2022 the sequel was released, titled The Grump: In Search of an Escort.
