= The Big Freeze (film) =

- Directed by: Eric Sykes
- Written by: Eric Sykes
- Starring: Eric Sykes; Bob Hoskins; Eila Roine
- Release date: 1993
- Running time: 45 minutes
- Countries: United Kingdom; Finland
- Language: English

The Big Freeze is a 1993 featurette-length film written and directed by Eric Sykes. The action centres on mishaps involving a father and son plumbing team attending to business in sub-zero temperatures at a retirement home in Finland. Like other Sykes directorial vehicles, the piece is a silent comedy with a star cast – here including Bob Hoskins, John Mills, Donald Pleasence and Spike Milligan.

== Synopsis ==
Two accident-prone plumbers go to fix the plumbing at a home for retired gentle-folk on the coldest day of the year in Finland. Everything that can go wrong for these plumbers goes wrong.

== Cast ==
- Bob Hoskins as Sidney
- Eric Sykes as Mr. Blick
- Eila Roine as Matron
- Donald Pleasence as Soup slurper
- Raija Laakso as Louise
- Sonja Lumme as Pretty Nurse
- John Mills as Dapper Man
- Spike Milligan as Der Schauspieler
- Sylvi Salonen as The Flapper
- Hellin Auvinen-Salmi as Old Lady
- Helinä Viitanen as Zimmer Lady
- Erkki Thil as Film Director
- Gabriel Laszlo as Fencer with Wig
- Hannes Anttila as Fencer
- Gunnar Strommer as Man in Bath
- Lasse Tiilkainen as Magician
- Ransu Alhoniemi as Juggler
- Mary Hayley Bell as Nursing Home Resident (uncredited)

== Production ==
The film was shot in Hervanta and Teisko, both districts in Tampere, Finland.
