= Love and Other Troubles =

2012 film

- Theatrical poster
- Directed by: Samuli Valkama
- Written by: Katri Manninen; Samuli Valkama
- Produced by: Jesse Fryckman
- Starring: Emilie de Ravin; Jussi Nikkilä; Ville Virtanen
- Cinematography: Anssi Leino
- Edited by: Antti Reikko
- Production company: Bronson Club
- Distributed by: Nordisk Film
- Release date: 27 January 2012 (Finland)
- Running time: 87 minutes
- Country: Finland
- Languages: English; Finnish
- Budget: €1.5 million

Love and Other Troubles (original Finnish title: Hulluna Saraan lit. Mad about Sara) is a 2012 Finnish romantic comedy film directed by Samuli Valkama. It stars Emilie de Ravin as Sara, an American line dance teacher, who meets Ville, a 25-year-old former child star, and his father, an ex-rock star, who both fall in love with her. The film premiered on 27 January 2012 in Finland.

== Cast ==
- Emilie de Ravin as Sara
- Jussi Nikkilä as Ville
- Ville Virtanen as Dad
- Tiina Lymi as Leena
- Jessica Grabowsky as Minna
- Jussi Lampi as Skidi
- Jani Volanen as Eikka
- Janne Reinikainen as Juontaja
