= Ällitälli =

- Country of origin: Finland

Original release
- Network: Yle TV1
- Release: 1971 – 1972

Ällitälli is a Finnish television series. It first aired on Yle TV1 in 1971 and last aired in 1972.

== Cast ==
- Heikki Kinnunen
- Leo Lastumäki
- Olavi Ahonen
- Pirjo Viitanen

== See also ==
- List of Finnish television series
