= Janne Reinikainen (actor) =

Finnish actor

- Born: 10 March 1969 (age 57); Kangasniemi, Finland
- Occupation: Actor
- Years active: 1991–present

Janne Reinikainen (born 10 March 1969) is a Finnish actor, actor, director, and screenwriter. He starred in the 2014 film The Grump, and more recently had a role in the hit 2025 TV series Queen of Fucking Everything.

== Early life and education ==
Janne Reinikainen was born on 10 March 1969 in Kangasniemi, Finland.

Reinikanen is married with journalist Sonja Saarikoski and has two children from a former marriage with actress Johanna af Schultén: Selma af Schultén (actor and performer) and Alvar af Schultén (actor and model).

== Career ==
As of August 2026 Reinikainen has appeared in over 60 films and television series, and has also directed and written scripts.

In 2012, he voiced the role of Melman the giraffe, in the Finnish version of Madagascar 3: Europe's Most Wanted. In 2014, he played Kiminkinen in the comedy feature film The Grump.

In September 2020, he appeared on stage in the role of Agrado, in a Finnish National Theatre production of All About My Mother (Kaikki äidistäni). There was some a social media controversy about the casting, as playing the character as a man meant representing them as a transvestite rather than a transgender woman.

In 2025, Reinikainen played Lauri Purola in the yle hit comedy drama TV series Queen of Fucking Everything, created and directed by Tiina Lymi, after he was called in on short notice to replace Tommi Korpela, who had originally been cast in the role.

== Selected filmography ==
His film roles include:

Year	Title	Role	Notes
2000	Badding		
2006	Saippuaprinssi		
2012	Love and Other Troubles		
2014	The Grump		
2017	Miami		
2025	Queen of Fucking Everything	Lauri Purola	
