= Eila Roine =

Finnish actress (1931–2025)

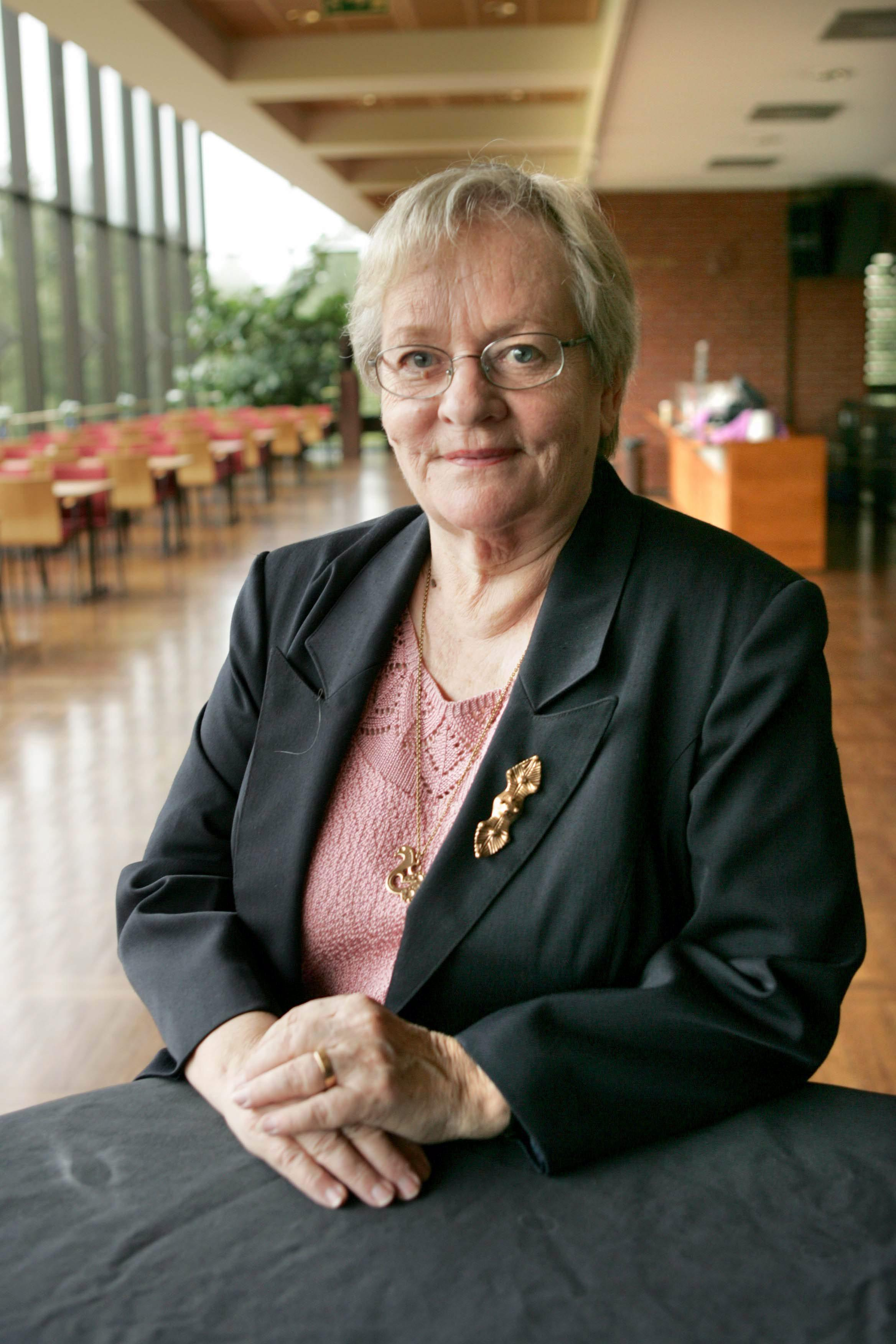
Roine in 2004

Eila Orvokki Roine-Auvinen (26 November 1931 – 8 December 2025) was a Finnish actress. She worked for Tampereen Työväen Teatteri from 1951 until her retirement in 1994.

== On television ==
Roine was best known for her role as Kaija in a television series Heikki ja Kaija (1961–1971) in which she played opposite her husband, Vili Auvinen (1931–1996). She also appeared in Rintamäkeläiset (1974) and in a teen series Pertsa ja Kilu (1975–1976), directed by Auvinen. For younger generations, she was known as "Eila-mummi" (Grandma Eila) in a children's program Pikku Kakkonen. In 2004, she was named the "Grandparent of the Year" by the Finnish Union for Senior Services. Although mostly known for her television and theatrical work, Roine also appeared in several films during her career.

== Personal life and death ==
Roine was married to Vili Auvinen until his death in 1996. They had two sons together; director and actor Tommi Auvinen and lighting and sound designer Janne Auvinen. Her father Eero Roine (1904–1966) was an actor, as are her siblings Esko Roine and Liisa Roine.

Roine died on 8 December 2025, at the age of 94.

== Selected filmography ==
- Pitkäjärveläiset (1951)
- Poika eli kesäänsä (1955)
- Musta rakkaus (1957)
- Täällä Pohjantähden alla (1968)
- Vodkaa, komisario Palmu (1969)
- The Big Freeze (1993)
- Kohtalon kirja (2003)
- Juoksuhaudantie (2004)
- Skavabölen pojat (2009)
- Tie pohjoiseen (2012)
- 21 tapaa pilata avioliitto (2013)
