= Stormskerry Maja =

2024 Finnish drama film

- International film poster
- Swedish: Stormskärs Maja; Finnish: Myrskyluodon Maija
- Directed by: Tiina Lymi
- Written by: Tiina Lymi
- Based on: Stormskärs-Maja book series by Anni Blomqvist
- Produced by: Hanna Virolainen; Jukka Helle; Markus Selin
- Starring: Amanda Jansson; Linus Troedsson
- Cinematography: Rauno Ronkainen
- Edited by: Joona Louhivuori
- Music by: Lauri Porra
- Production company: Solar Films
- Distributed by: Nordisk Film
- Release date: 19 January 2024 (Finland)
- Running time: 163 minutes
- Country: Finland
- Languages: Swedish, English
- Budget: €3.8 million

Stormskerry Maja (Swedish: Stormskärs Maja; Finnish: Myrskyluodon Maija) is a 2024 Swedish-language Finnish historical drama film directed by Tiina Lymi. Based on the five-volume book series by Anni Blomqvist, the film, set in the Åland archipelago, tells the story of Maja, who with her husband Janne faces life's challenges and adversities on a remote island in the 19th century. Amanda Jansson and Linus Troedsson star in the main roles.

The film premiered in Finland on 19 January 2024. The film has been selected for the Gothenburg (GFF) and Rotterdam (IFFR) film festivals. The film was nominated for nine awards at the 79th Jussi Awards, where it won seven awards, including Best Film and Best Director.

== Plot ==
Maja attends a funeral with her family, after which Janne and his father Erker visit. Janne, the third son, will not inherit a house or barn. In the middle of the night, Maja is awakened by her mother, a midwife, to assist with a difficult childbirth. The mother dies, leaving Maja devastated. At a midsummer celebration, Maja becomes upset after an accidental embrace with Magnus and runs to the water's edge, praying to the sea mother to reveal an image of her future husband. A young man finds her and encourages her to look into the water with him, though she insists she does not believe in it.

Maja returns home to find her father discussing her marriage. Though her father suggests Anna as a more sensible choice, Janne insists on marrying Maja. He places a ring on her finger, prompting her to run away. Maja learns from Anna that Janne plans to take her to a barren skerry. She reluctantly prepares for the journey. At a frozen lake, she again implores the Sea Mother to reveal her husband, and the ice cracks.

Erker and Janne visit Maja's homestead with gifts, but she remains disinterested in the marriage. She accompanies Janne to secure a loan from Saka, a wealthy man. Janne says he will work hard and build a life for them. Though anxious, Maja goes through with the ceremony and they awkwardly consummate the marriage. The following morning, Janne explains the potential for a self-sufficient life at Stormskerry. They laugh and kiss before setting sail. At Stormskerry, Janne nails a cross above the door at Maja's request, and the couple enjoys the freedom of their new home. Maja teaches him about the spirits and creatures of the waters.

The couple’s families visit to help build their barn. Maja grows fond of Janne and worries while he is at sea. She discovers she is pregnant, and the couple daydreams about filling the skerry with children. At a market, Maja sells spun yarn but cannot sign her name, prompting her to learn to read with Janne’s encouragement. When news of a shipwreck reaches them, Janne goes to help. Maja goes into labour and gives birth to Maria. Over time, they have two more children: August and Mikael. Maja continues her lessons in writing, also teaching her children.

As the Åland War unfolds, Janne is pressured to take sides, though he insists he is Ålandic rather than Finnish, Swedish, or Russian. British ships arrive, and Maja urges Janne to hide while she confronts the quartering soldiers. When the men threaten their cow, Maja appeals to the sympathetic Lieutenant John Wilson, who intervenes. Maja tends to the wounded and gains their help with winter chores. The British return wounded, and Maja comforts Wilson. The soldiers depart; Wilson leaves gifts for the children. Maja dons trousers and teaches the children to fish.

Maja's family visits again, urging her to return home, but she refuses, certain because of her dreams that Janne will come back. Tragedy strikes when Mikael drowns while keeping watch for Janne's return. Maja recovers his body, and Janne returns before they hold a funeral on the shore. Time passes, and the couple baptises their new son Gabriel. A larger boat is built to improve their livelihood, yet Maja remains haunted by dreams of Mikael. She becomes pregnant again, but Janne dies at sea. Maja gives birth to Johanna and chooses to remain on Stormskerry. She signs her name to secure a loan independently after Saka's wife speaks up for her. In later years, Maja is an elderly woman living on Stormskerry with her grown children, cherishing her memories of Janne.

== Cast ==
- Amanda Jansson as "Maja" Maria Lovisa Mickelsdotter
- Linus Troedsson as "Janne" Johan Eriksson
- Desmond Eastwood as Lieutenant John Wilson
- Tony Doyle as Captain Harris
- Birthe Wingren as Vallborg
- Tobias Zilliacus as Mickel: Maja's father
- Jonna Järnefelt as Sara Lisa: Maja's mother; a midwife
- Amanda Kilpeläinen Arvidsson as Anna: Maja's practical sister
- Niklas Åkerfelt as Erker: Janne's father
- Carl-Kristian Rundman as Saka
- Andrea Björkholm as Saka's wife
- Christian Fandango Sundgren as Magnus
- Pablo Ounaskari as Per: Anna's husband
- Jan-Erik Berglund as priest
- Elina Knihtilä as clothier

== Accolades ==
Year	Award	Category	Nominee(s)	Result	Ref.
2024	8th BCN Film Fest	Best Film		Won	
2025	79th Jussi Awards	Best Film	Stormskerry Maja	Won	
2025	79th Jussi Awards	Best Director	Tiina Lymi	Won	
2025	79th Jussi Awards	Best Leading Actor	Amanda Jansson	Won	
2025	79th Jussi Awards	Best Supporting Actor	Linus Troedsson	Nominated	
2025	79th Jussi Awards	Best Cinematography	Rauno Ronkainen	Nominated	
2025	79th Jussi Awards	Best Music	Lauri Porra	Won	
2025	79th Jussi Awards	Best Editing	Joona Louhivuori	Won	
2025	79th Jussi Awards	Best Sound Design	Kirka Sainio	Nominated	
2025	79th Jussi Awards	Best Set Design	Otso Linnalaakso	Won	
2025	79th Jussi Awards	People's Choice	Stormskerry Maja	Won	

== See also ==
- List of Finnish films of the 2020s
