= Sixpack (film) =

2011 film

- Directed by: Ville Jankeri
- Written by: Ville Jankeri; Mikko Rimminen
- Produced by: Lasse Saarinen; Risto Salomaa
- Starring: Jussi Nikkilä
- Cinematography: Jarkko T. Laine
- Release date: 2 September 2011
- Running time: 80 minutes
- Country: Finland
- Language: Finnish

Sixpack (Finnish: Pussikaljaelokuva) is a 2011 Finnish comedy film directed by Ville Jankeri.

== Cast ==
- Jussi Nikkilä as Marsalkka
- Ylermi Rajamaa as Lihi
- Eero Milonoff as Henninen
- Marjut Maristo as Laura
- Tytti Junna as Anna
- Niilo Syväoja as Erno
- Veera Tapper as Veera
- Paavo Kinnunen as Esa
