= Amrion =

Film production company based in Estonia

Amrion is an Estonian film production company.

The company is founded in 2003 by Riina Sildos.

== Filmography ==
- 2013: "Viru. Vabaduse saatkond" (documentary film)
- 2012: "Eestlanna Pariisis" (feature film)
- 2013: "Kertu" (feature film)
- 2014: "Ma ei tule tagasi" (feature film)
- 2016: "Teesklejad" (feature film)
- 2018: "Mihkel" (feature film)
- 2018: "Seltsimees laps" (feature film)
- 2023: "Estonia" (television series)
