= A Moment in the Reeds =

- Directed by: Mikko Mäkelä
- Written by: Mikko Mäkelä
- Produced by: Mikko Mäkelä; James Watson; Jarno Pimperi
- Starring: Janne Puustinen; Boodi Kabbani; Mika Melender
- Cinematography: Iikka Salminen
- Edited by: Mikko Mäkelä
- Music by: Hopeinen kuu As Ceremony-30950
- Production company: Wild Beast Productions
- Release date: October 6, 2017 (London Film Festival)
- Running time: 107 minutes
- Countries: Finland; United Kingdom
- Languages: English; Finnish

A Moment in the Reeds is a 2017 Finnish romantic drama film written and directed by Mikko Mäkelä in his feature directorial debut. It stars Janne Puustinen and Boodi Kabbani. The film had its world premiere at the 2017 BFI London Film Festival as part of the Love strand. Unusually for a Finnish film, most of the dialogue is in English as it is the only language shared by the two leading characters.

== Plot ==
Leevi returns to Finland from his university studies in Paris to spend the summer helping his father Jouko renovate the family lakehouse for sale. Leevi is estranged from his conservative father, his only living relative, and hopes to avoid mandatory military service by obtaining French citizenship. Tareq, an architect by profession who has come to Finland from war-torn Syria seeking asylum, has been hired to help with the work.

When Leevi's father returns to town on business, the two young men, speaking English, their only common language, establish a connection. They spend a few days discovering one another during an idyllic Finnish midsummer.

== Cast ==
- Janne Puustinen as Leevi
- Boodi Kabbani as Tareq
- Mika Melender as Jouko
- Virpi Rautsiala as Pirjo

== Production ==
Mikko Mäkelä, a Finn from Lappeenranta, South Karelia, who has lived in England for ten years wrote the screenplay and directed the film. He explained the absence of a feature-length Finnish film addressing gay relationships saying "Non-commercial documentaries are alive and well in Finland, but full-length fiction cinema is always made with the returns in mind. Production companies don't take risks in countries this small." As a result, most of the film's budget came from private financing with a very small portion coming from crowd funding Indiegogo. Filming took place in August 2016 including near Lappeenranta.

On his decision to choose gay actors for the lead roles, director Mäkelä wrote: "Casting gay actors for gay roles was the only option that made sense for me"."

The film had its world premiere in the Love strand of the BFI London Film Festival on 6 October 2017. It has since gone on to screen at festivals around the world including Goteborg International Film Festival, Seattle International Film Festival and Frameline in San Francisco.

== Reception ==
A reviewer in Film Inquiry called A Moment in the Reeds "the biggest surprise of the London Film Festival". He noted the plot's superficial resemblance to that of God’s Own Country, which was in production at the same time, but found the Finnish film "far more subtle" and, like its British counterpart, "one of the most moving gay romance stories of recent years". In Sweden's MovieZine, Alexander Dunerfors said the filmmakers turned their low budget to advantage by using just a few actors in an isolated setting and noted that "Most of the dialogue has been improvised by the actors themselves, giving a strong authentic touch–even in broken English." A German reviewer called it "a film pearl that shines with truthfulness and authenticity". He described the principal characters' relationship to Finland, one alienated and the other finding refuge: "Homeland is a strange world for both of them."

Variety magazine's Dennis Harvey wrote favourably of the film. "There's an admirable quiet intensity to A Moment in the Reeds, a first feature by London-based Mikko Mäkelä set in his native Finland. Superficially similar to God's Own Country, this bittersweet tale of attraction between a prodigal son and a refugee worker is both a more straightforward romance for much of its runtime and a sadder one in the end."

On the review aggregator website Rotten Tomatoes, 92% of 12 critics' reviews are positive, with an average rating of 7.6/10.
