= Juha Lehtola =

Finnish film director and screenwriter (born 1966)

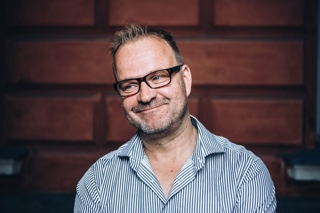
- Lehtola in 2016
- Born: June 3, 1966 (age 60); Tampere, Finland
- Occupations: Film director, Screenwriter

Juha Lehtola (born June 3, 1966) is a Finnish film director and screenwriter. He has scripted three feature films, three television series and six TV movies and has directed two feature films.

Juha Lehtola’s works deal with contemporary life, tingled with melancholy and comedy. During his career Lehtola has done thrillers, family stories and his latest television series Sisäilmaa (Inner air, written with Tiina Lymi) deals with byrocracy and unemployment policy.

== Career ==
During his career, Juha Lehtola has worked in both theater and television as a director, screenwriter and playwright. He also teaches directing at the Theater Academy of Finland and has worked in the film school of Finland, ELO AALTO, as an Executive in Residence.

=== Film and television ===
He started his career in film and television in 1989, with a screenplay for a TV movie Paratiisin kahleissa. In the 90's he scripted two TV movies: Saint John's Bread Tree (1992) and White Marble (1994), which were both directed by Matti Ijäs, acclaimed Finnish film director.

Woman in the Meadow premiered in 2003, which was Juha Lehtola's first work as a director. The film was awarded with Venla award (the Finnish equivalent of the Emmy Award) for the best TV movie in 2003.

In 2007, Lehtola directed TV series Hunger for Love, which won four Venla awards. In 2015 he collaborated again with Matti Ijäs for a Love and Law, trilogy of TV movies about a relationship between love and law.

In 2014, Juha Lehtola's first feature film, Boy Upside Down premiered. It's a tragicomedy about an 11-year old boy whose parents die in a car accident.

Juha Lehtola returned to feature films in 2018, with The Human Part, Finnish drama comedy, which screenplay he co-wrote with the famous Finnish author Kari Hotakainen. Film was nominated with four Jussi awards, the most prestige Finnish film award.

=== Other works ===
Juha Lehtola has directed a number of plays for the Finnish National Theater and for other major theaters in Finland. He has also worked in the fields of documentary film, music videos and radio dramas, as well as script consultant in many Finnish feature films and television series, for example television series Invisible Heroes, which received the Best Fiction Prix Europe 2019 award.

== Awards ==
- Critic's Spurs award 1995
- Young arts in Finland award 1998
- Prix Italia 1999
- Venla award for best television film (Woman in the Meadow) 2003
- Special Venla award 2003
- Venla award for best director 2007
- Golden TV award for the best drama series (Hunger for Love) 2008

== Filmography ==
=== Feature films ===
As a director and screenwriter

- 2014 Boy Upside Down
- 2018 The Human Part (screenplay written together with Kari Hotakainen)

As a screenwriter

- 2018 Happier Times, Grump (screenplay written together with Tuomas Kyrö and Tiina Lymi)

=== TV series and films ===
As a director

- 2003 Woman in the Meadow, TV film
- 2007 Hunger for Love, TV series
- 2012 Factory, TV series (written by Pirkko Saisio)
- 2015 Love and Law, TV film

As a scriptwriter

- 1992 Saint John's Bread Tree, TV film, adaptation
- 1994 White Marble, TV film, adaptation
- 2003 Onwards, TV film
- 2007 Hunger for love, TV series
