= Grumpy =

Grumpy means unhappy, dissatisfied or irritable.

It may refer to:

- Grumpy, one of the Seven Dwarfs in some adaptations of the fairy tale Snow White
- Grumpy (1923 film), a silent drama
- Grumpy (1930 film), a remake of the 1923 film
- Grumpy, a nickname of the drag racer Bill Jenkins
- Grumpy Cat, (2012-2019), American Internet celebrity cat
- Grumpy, a dinosaur character from the 1974 television series Land of the Lost
- Grumpy Bear, a character from the cartoon the Care Bears
- Mr. Grumpy, title character of a novel in the Mr. Men children's book series

== See also ==
- Grump (disambiguation)
