= Vårdö =

- Municipality
- Vårdö kommun
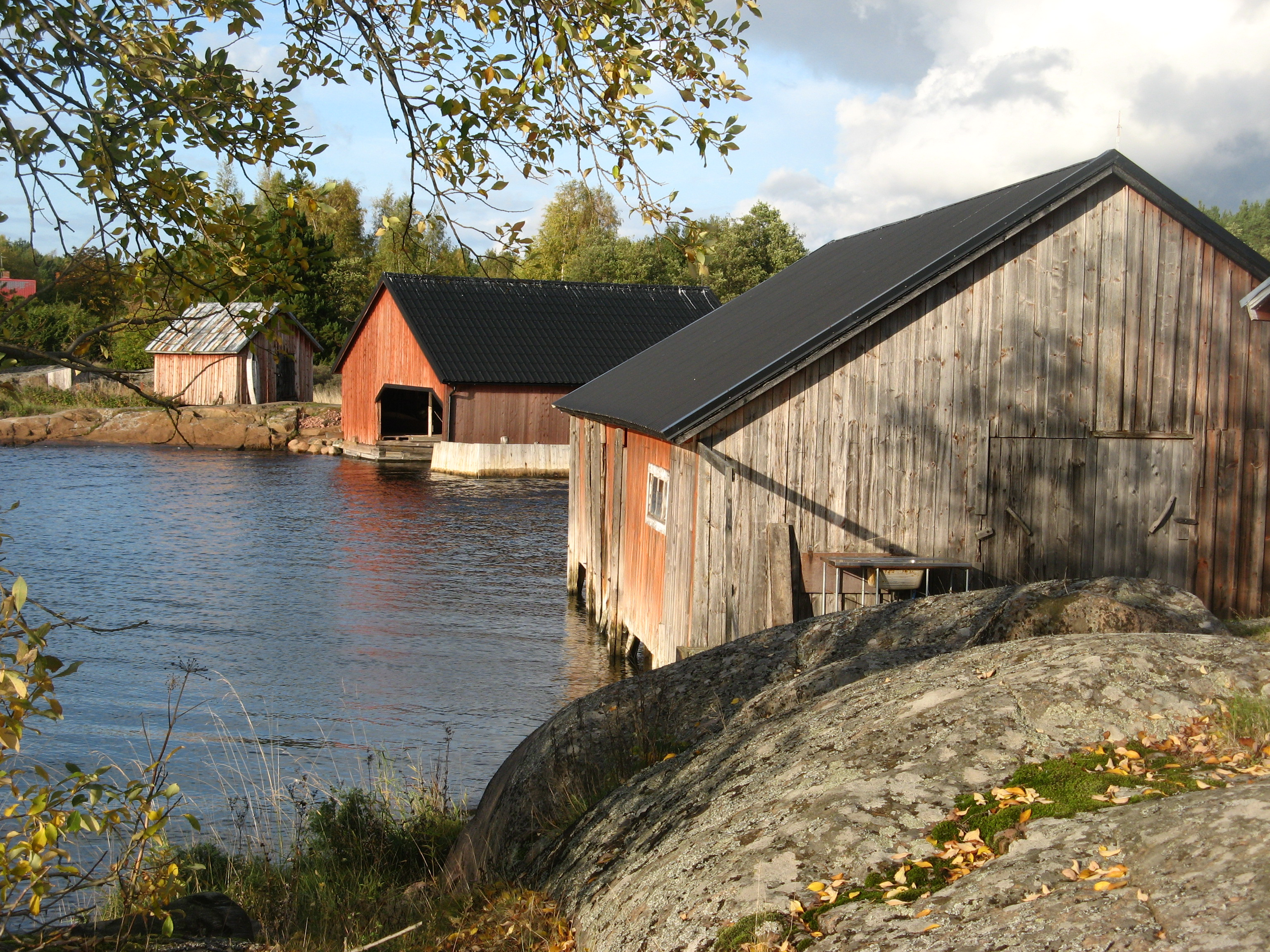
- Boathouses in Simskäla, island in the north of Vårdö

- Flag Coat of arms

- Location of Vårdö in Finland

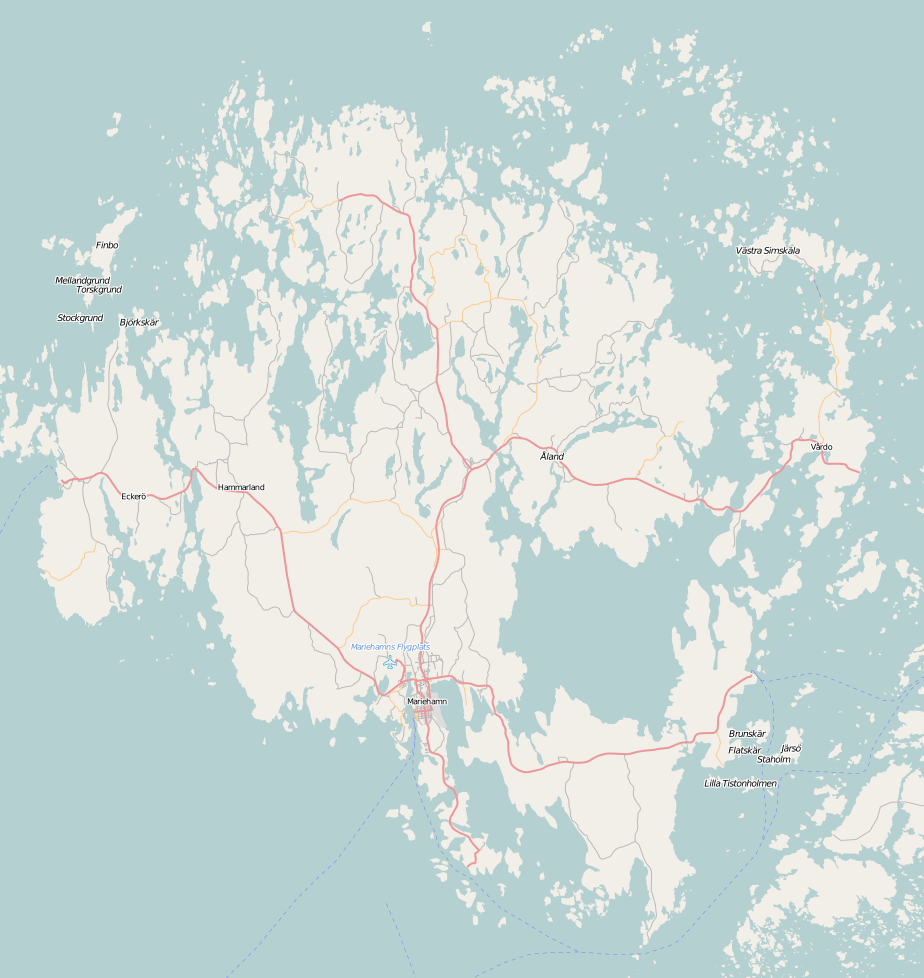
- Location in Åland
- Coordinates: 60°14.5′N 020°22.5′E
- Country: Finland
- Region: Åland
- Sub-region: Archipelago

Government
  - Municipal manager: Erik Brunström

Area (2018-01-01)
  - Total: 572.56 km^{2} (221.07 sq mi)
  - Land: 101.75 km^{2} (39.29 sq mi)
  - Water: 471.16 km^{2} (181.92 sq mi)
  - Rank: 298th largest in Finland

Population (2025-12-31)
  - Total: 465
  - Rank: 303rd largest in Finland
  - Density: 4.57/km^{2} (11.8/sq mi)

Population by native language
  - Swedish: 84.9% (official)
  - Finnish: 4.1%
  - Others: 11%

Population by age
  - 0 to 14: 16.7%
  - 15 to 64: 53.3%
  - 65 or older: 30%
- Time zone: UTC+02:00 (EET)
  - Summer (DST): UTC+03:00 (EEST)
- Website: www.vardo.ax

Vårdö is an island municipality of Åland, an autonomous territory of Finland.

The municipality has a population of 465 (31 December 2025) and covers an area of 572.56 square kilometres (221.07 sq mi) of which 471.16 km^{2} (181.92 sq mi) is water. The population density is 4.57 inhabitants per square kilometre (11.8/sq mi) of land.

The municipality is unilingually Swedish.

Håkan Skogsjö has documented the permanently residing population of Vårdö from the 17th century to the present, covering the history of the municipality as a whole, its individual hamlets, down to each original farmstead and the families who lived there.

Two notable Finnish authors, Sally Salminen and Anni Blomqvist, were born in Vårdö. Blomqvist lived her whole life on the Vårdö island of Simskäla.

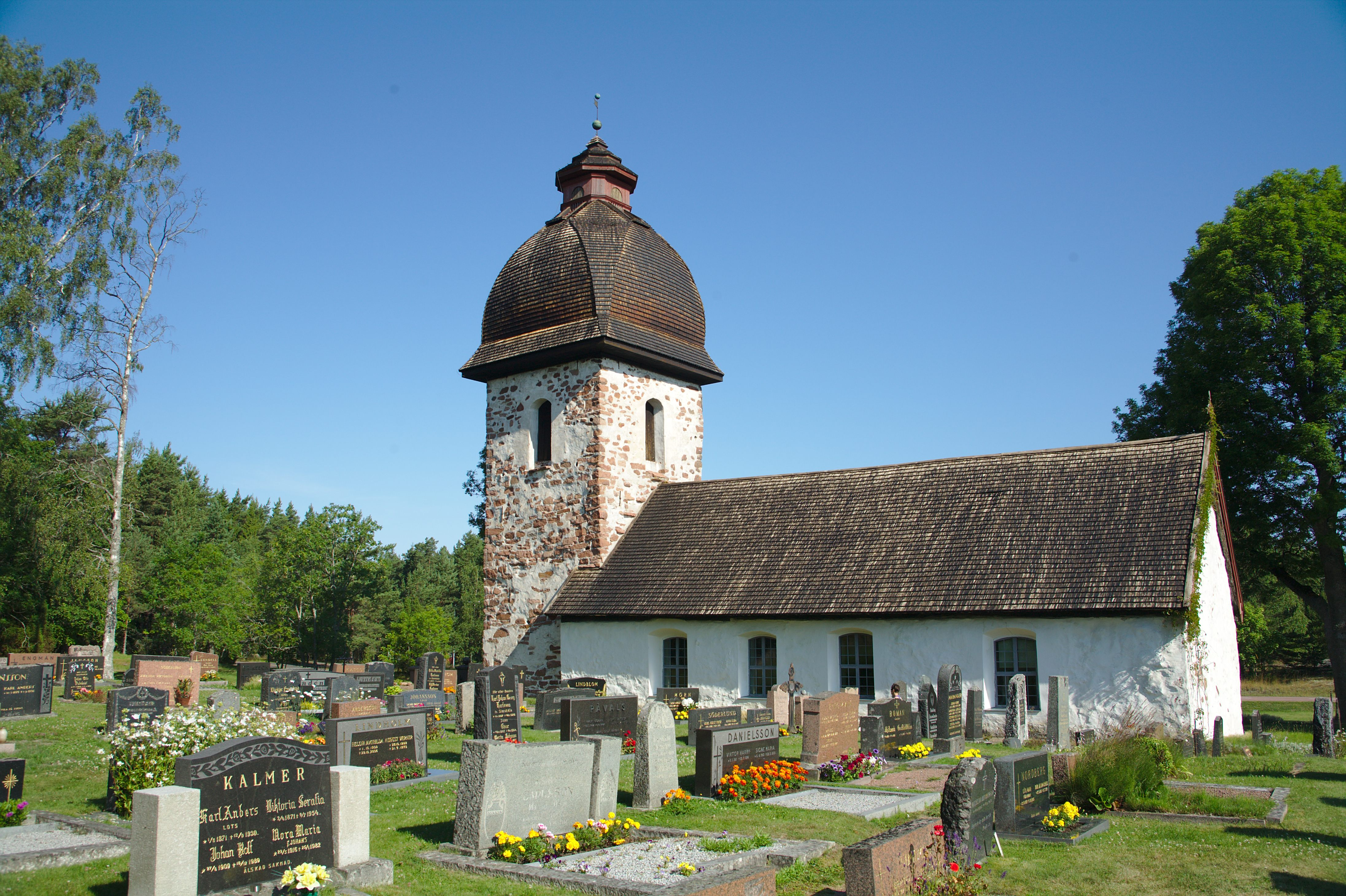
Vårdö church and cemetery

The word "vårdö" means "the guardian island". On the highest mountain of Vårdö people used to light bonfires to warn the other islands of danger.

The old post route from Stockholm to Turku went through Vårdö, by road from Båthusviken to Hullvik on the main island, otherwise by water. The local citizens took care of the mail transport in any type of weather. The dangerous mail transport lasted for over 300 years (1638–1910). Many people drowned on these journeys and in the memory of them the municipality of Vårdö has erected a memorial on the seashore of Hullvik. Today the post route road is marked with milestones.
