= Vili Auvinen =

Finnish actor and theatre director

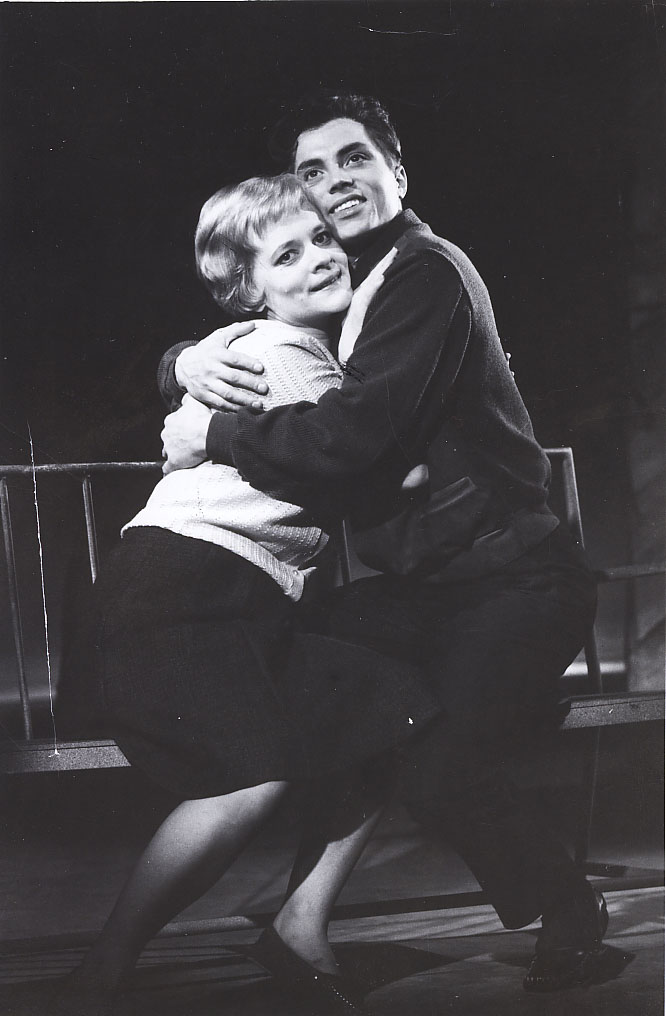
Auvinen with his wife Eila Roine in 1962

Vilho Emil "Vili" Auvinen (11 November 1931 – 2 August 1996) was a Finnish actor and theatre director.

== Theatrical background ==
Auvinen's parents Vilho Auvinen and Hellin Auvinen-Salmi were also actors, so he became familiar with the world of theatre at a young age. His career started as a set designer and in small supporting roles. Auvinen turned to directing in the 1950s after getting hired by Tampereen Työväen Teatteri.

== In television and films ==
Vili Auvinen is best known for his role as Heikki in a television series Heikki ja Kaija (1961–1971) in which he played opposite his wife, Eila Roine. He also served as the director of the teen series Pertsa ja Kilu (1975–1976), based on the novels by Väinö Riikkilä.

In films, Auvinen only made a handful of appearances in the 1960s and 1970s. He is remembered for his role as Asumaniemi in an Edvin Laine film The Unknown Soldier (1955), the first adaptation of Väinö Linna's novel of the same name.

== Filmography ==
- Jälkeen syntiinlankeemuksen (1953)
- Tuntematon sotilas (1955)
- Poika eli kesäänsä (1955)
- Vääpeli Mynkhausen (1957)
- Musta rakkaus (1957)
- Murheenkryynin poika (1958)
- Äidittömät (1958)
- Villin Pohjolan kulta (1963)
