= Sebastian (2024 film) =

- Film poster
- Directed by: Mikko Mäkelä
- Written by: Mikko Mäkelä
- Produced by: James Robert Benjamin Watson
- Cinematography: Iikka Salminen
- Edited by: Arttu Salmi
- Music by: Ilari Heinilä
- Production companies: BFI; Screen Scotland; Finnish Film Foundation; Finnish Impact Film Fund; Yle; barry crerar; Bêtes Sauvages; Helsinki-filmi; Lemming Film België
- Distributed by: LevelK
- Release dates: 21 January 2024 (2024 Sundance Film Festival); 2 August 2024 (U.S.)
- Running time: 110 minutes
- Countries: United Kingdom; Finland; Belgium
- Language: English
- Box office: $65,636

Sebastian is a 2024 international co-production drama film written and directed by Mikko Mäkelä.

== Premise ==
Max, an aspiring young writer in London, begins living a double life as a sex worker in order to research his debut novel.

== Cast ==
- Ruaridh Mollica as Max Williamson
- Hiftu Quasem as Amna
- Jonathan Hyde as Nicholas
- Ingvar Sigurdsson as Daniel
- Lara Rossi as Claudia
- Leanne Best as Dionne
- David Nellist as Peter
- Pedro Minas as Oliver
- Musa Lutfi as Marcus
- Fleur Keith as Joan
- Dylan Brady as Joel
- Akbar Kurtha as Samir
- Marcus Macleod as Stuart
- Stella Gonet as Anne
- Orlando Norman as Theo

== Production ==
Written and directed by Mäkelä as his second feature, Sebastian was produced by James Watson for their joint company Bêtes Sauvages, co-produced by Helsinki-filmi and Lemming Film België, and executive produced by Ciara Barry and Rosie Crerar of barry crerar. The film was supported by the BFI and Screen Scotland, as well as the Finnish Film Foundation, Finnish Impact Film Fund, Great Point Media, BNP Paribas Film Finance, and the Belgian Tax Shelter.

Principal photography took place in London, Glasgow, and Brussels, with post-production in London, Antwerp and Helsinki.

== Release ==
In December 2023, it was revealed the film would premiere in January at the 2024 Sundance Film Festival in the World Cinema Dramatic Competition. LevelK acquired the international rights to the film ahead of its Sundance premiere. In February 2024, the film had been acquired by Kino Lorber for North America. They released the film theatrically on August 2, 2024. The film is available in Asia, Australia, New zealand, Mexico, Brazil on GagaOOLala.

== Reception ==
On review aggregator website Rotten Tomatoes, the film holds an approval rating of 71% based on 49 reviews, with an average rating of 6.9/10. The website's consensus reads: "Mollica compels as a young man caught between two lives and his performance elevates Sebastian, a provocative if uneven story that explores an artist's quest to find inspiration and authenticity in the name of art." Metacritic, which uses a weighted average, assigned the film a score of 53 out of 100, based on five critics, indicating "mixed or average" reviews.

=== Accolades ===
At Finland's 2024 Jussi Awards, Sebastian received nine nominations, including Best Picture, Best Director for Mäkelä, Best Lead Performance for Mollica, Best Supporting Performance for Hyde, and Best Screenplay for Mäkelä. Sebastian also tied with Stormskerry Maja for the most nominations that year. Mollica was also nominated for the 2024 British Independent Film Award for Breakthrough Performance.
