= Estonia (TV series) =

2023 Finnish television film

- Genre: Drama
- Created by: Miikko Oikkonen
- Screenplay by: Miikko Oikkonen
- Directed by: Måns Månsson; Juuso Syrjä
- Starring: Jussi Nikkilä; Claes Hartelius; Seidi Haarla; Kaspar Velberg; Pertti Sveholm
- Countries of origin: Finland, Sweden, Belgium, Estonia
- Original languages: Finnish, Swedish, Estonian, English
- No. of series: 1
- No. of episodes: 8

Production
- Executive producers: Matti Halonen; Johannes Lassila
- Cinematography: J-P Passi
- Editors: George Cragg; Sam Hodge; Kenneth Klaile; Moonika Põdersalu
- Production companies: Fisher King Productions; Amrion; Kärnfilm; Panache Productions
- Budget: c. €15 million

Original release
- Network: MTV Katsomo

Estonia is a Finnish eight-part drama television series. The series tells about the sinking of the MS Estonia ferry in 1994. Based on the actual investigation reports, the story follows the accident investigation in Finland, Sweden and Estonia through several people, in connection with which the viewers also see events on the car ferry, the sinking and its rescue efforts.

The series is created by Miikko Oikkonen and directed by Måns Månsson and Juuso Syrjä. The series was released on the C More streaming service on 12 October 2023. The series has also been selected for the primetime program of the 2023 Toronto International Film Festival.

== Cast ==
- Jussi Nikkilä as Henri Peltonen
- Claes Hartelius as Johan Bildgren
- Seidi Haarla as Kati Peltonen
- Kaspar Velberg as Janek Tamm
- Pertti Sveholm as Pasi Toukola
- Peter Andersson as Jörgen Berglund
- Anders Mossling as Erik Claeson
- Pelle Heikkilä as Ari Luoma-Aho
- Eero Saarinen as Lasse Aihinen
- Doris Tislar as Grete Kukk
- Freddy Åsblom as Axel
- Christian Saldert as Lucas
- Gert Raudsep as Ermo Raud
- Rain Simmul as Mattias Vint
- Egon Nuter as Arnold Rooste
- Arndt Schwering-Sohnrey as Gustav Keipp
- Kristofer Gummerus as Korhonen
- Sven Boräng as Peter Ekblom
- Dennis Nylund as Seppo Lehtinen
- Markus Habakukk as Henrik Lapin
- Malin Persson as Birgitta Lindqvist
- Emil Almén as Oscar Berg
- Simo Reilimo as Finnish TV-reporter

== Production ==
According to MTV Oy's announcement, Estonia is so far the most expensive drama series produced in Finland. The budget of the series is around €15 million. It has been financed by C More, MTV Oy and the Swedish television channel TV4. The Finnish Film Foundation has granted the project development support in the years 2020–2022 totaling €225,000. The actors of the series are from Finland, Sweden, Estonia and Germany.

Filming of the series began in June 2022 and ended in October of the same year. Filming takes place in Finland, Sweden, Estonia and Turkey. The sea scenes are shot at studios in Belgium that focus on water scenes. The special effects are made, for example, in the United Kingdom and Canada.

== See also ==
- Baltic Storm
