= Juoksuhaudantie =

2002 novel by Kari Hotakainen

- First edition
- Author: Kari Hotakainen
- Language: Finnish
- Published: 2002
- Publisher: WSOY
- Publication place: Finland
- Awards: Nordic Council's Literature Prize of 2004

Juoksuhaudantie is a 2002 novel by Finnish author Kari Hotakainen. It won the Nordic Council's Literature Prize in 2004.
