= Mikko Mäkelä (filmmaker) =

British-based Finnish filmmaker (born 1989)

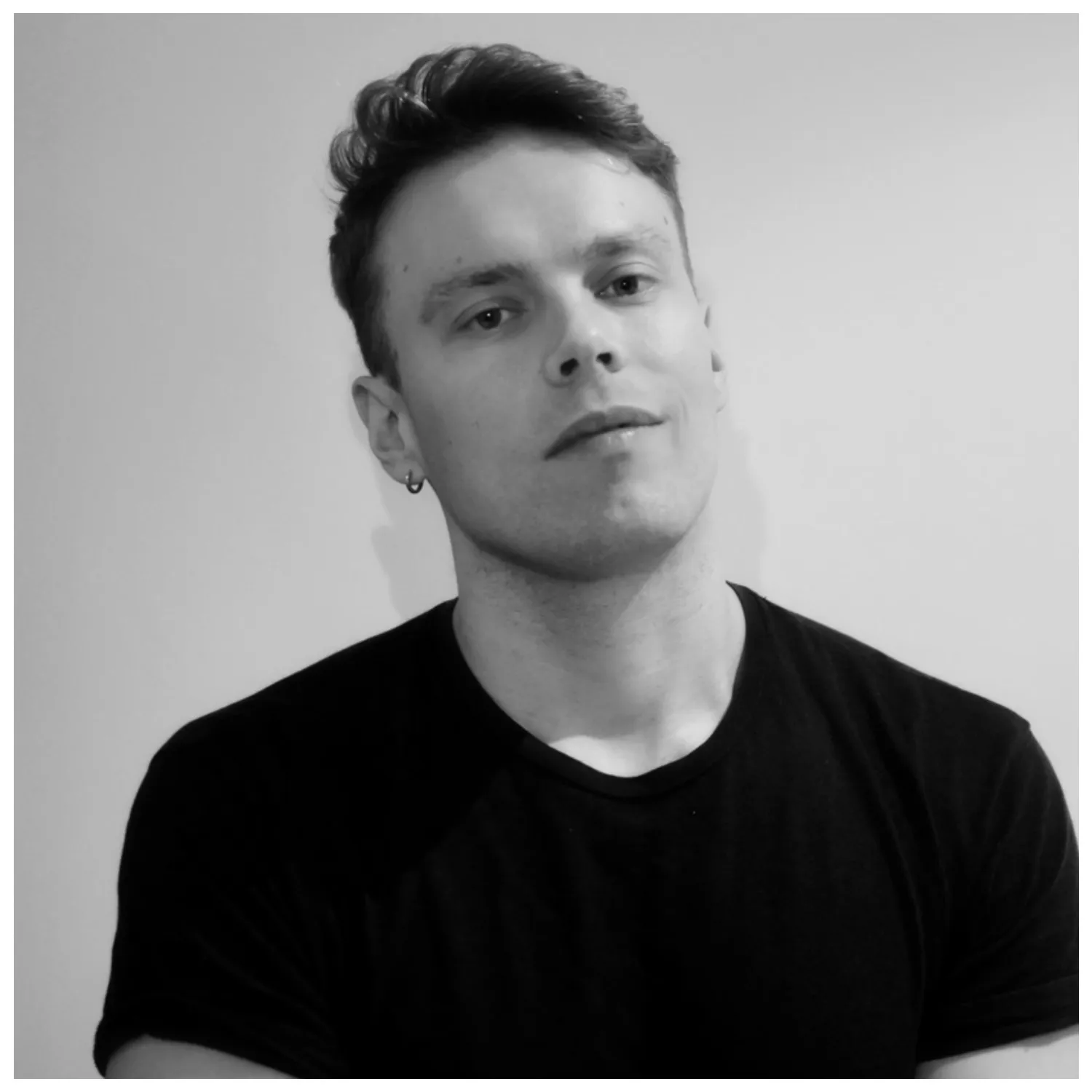
- Born: January 1989 (age 37)
- Other name: Mikko Makela
- Education: University of Nottingham; University College London; City Literary Institute
- Years active: 2012–present
- Website: www.mikkomakela.com

Mikko Mäkelä (born January 1989) is a UK-based Finnish filmmaker. He is known for directing the feature films A Moment in the Reeds (2017) and Sebastian (2024). He was listed by IndieWire as one of 25 LGBTQ filmmakers on the rise.

== Early life ==
Mäkelä grew up in a small town in eastern Finland. He was 18 when he moved to the United Kingdom, where he studied English Literature and French at the University of Nottingham and University College London (UCL), and Drama at the City Literary Institute. He began his filmmaking career as an editor.

== Filmography ==
Year	Title	Director	Writer	Producer	Editor	Other	Notes
2015	The Coven				Assistant		
2015	Hard to Lose				Yes		Short film
2015	Fallen Soldiers				Assistant		
2017	A Moment in the Reeds	Yes	Yes	Yes	Yes		
2022	Palvelus	Yes	Yes		Yes		Short film
2023	Nothing Special	Yes	Yes	Yes	Yes		Short film
2024	Sebastian	Yes	Yes		Yes		
