= Jussi Nikkilä =

Finnish actor

Jussi Nikkilä (born 28 June 1982 in Helsinki) is a Finnish actor and director. He is known for Ganes (2007), Covid fan tutte (2020), and Mozart: Don Giovanni (2020).

== Selected filmography ==
- Young Gods (2003)
- Beauty and the Bastard (2005)
- Ganes (2007)
- Sixpack (2011)
- Love and Other Troubles (2012)
- Cold Courage (2020)
- Covid fan tutte (2020)
- Estonia (2023)
