= Anni Blomqvist =

Finnish-Swedish novelist (1909–1990)

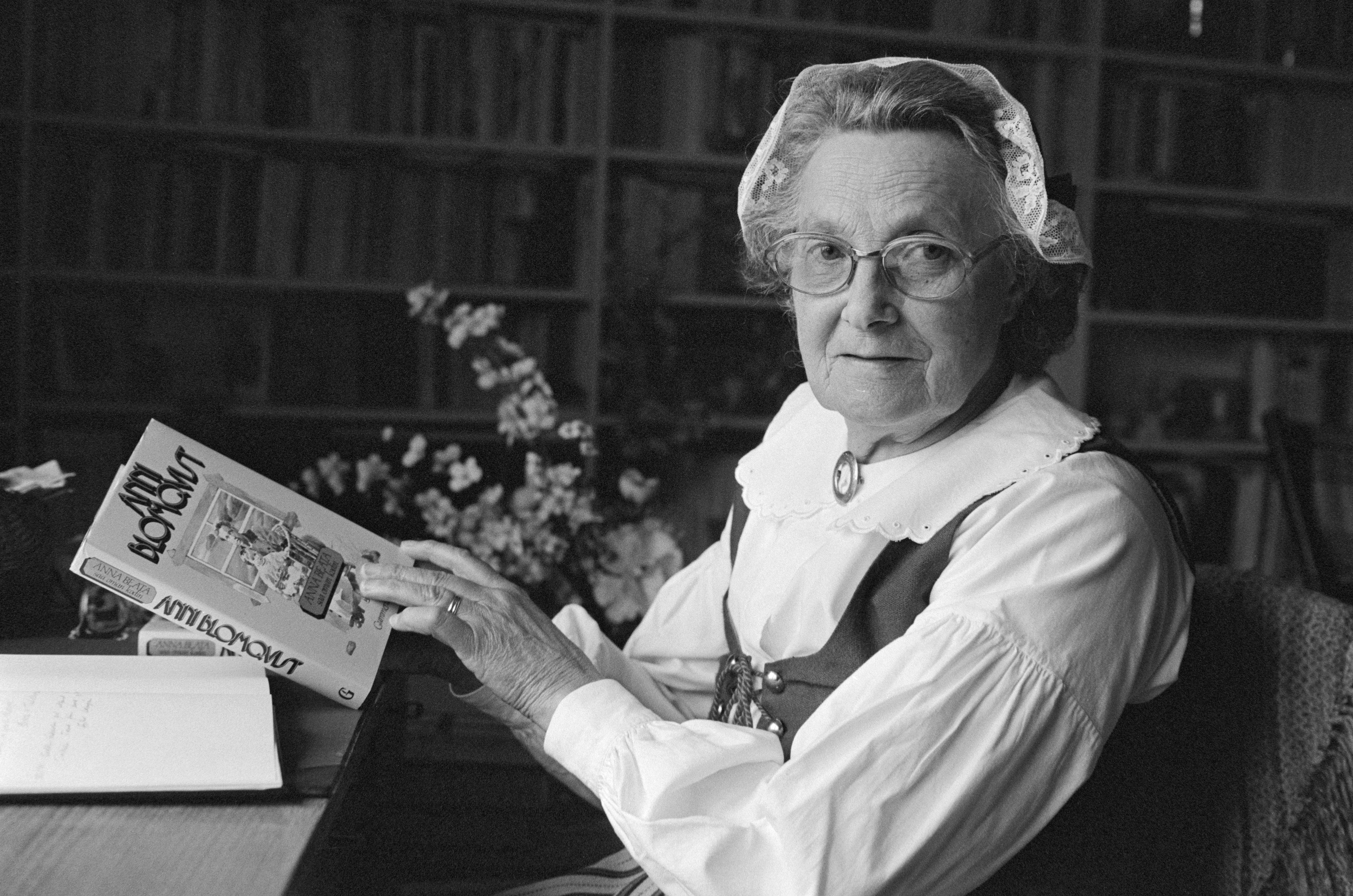
- Born: Anni Viktoria Karlsson; 7 October 1909; Simskäla, Vårdö, Åland, Grand Duchy of Finland, Russian Empire
- Died: 26 June 1990 (aged 80); Simskäla, Vårdö, Åland, Finland
- Occupations: Writer, Seamstress
- Spouse: Valter Blomqvist
- Children: Tommy (1939–1961); Bengt (1945–1987)
- Relatives: Sally Salminen, writer: 2nd cousin
- Writing career
- Language: Swedish
- Notable awards: Åland Provincial Government Prize (1967); Society of Swedish Literature in Finland Prize (1971, 1974); Längman Prize (1972); State Prize for Literature (1975); Pro Finlandia Medal (1977)

Anni Viktoria Blomqvist (née Karlsson; 7 October 1909 – 26 June 1990) was a Finland-Swedish novelist.

== Biography ==
Blomqvist was born in Vårdö, Åland, Grand Duchy of Finland, Russian Empire, the first of ten children of fisherman Viktor Karlsson and wife Anna. Her father, Viktor Hjalmar Karlsson, was also a farmer, and her mother was Anna Xenia Johansson. She attended folk school.Living with the family was Anni's maternal grandmother, who would serve as the basis for the protagonist in the Anna Beata trilogy of books.

Blomqvist married seaman Valter Blomqvist in 1936. Together they had four children, Tommy (b. 1939), twin daughters who died only hours after birth in 1940, and Bengt (b. 1945). The family supported itself by fishing, shipping and small-scale farming.

Blomqvist was an active member of her community. As chairwoman of the local Martha organisation, she arranged courses and organized vaccinations. She also worked to bring electricity to Åland. Her first short story was published in 1949, when she won first prize in a writing competition.

In 1961, Valter and Tommy disappeared during a fishing trip. Their bodies were never recovered; their boat had presumably been overtaken by a storm. Anni began a diary as a way to deal with her grief. Her debut novel, I stormens spår was published in 1966, and was well received.

Two years later, the first novel in the Stormskärs-Maja series, Vägen till Stormskäret, was published. The series of five books, Blomqvist's most famous work, chronicled the life of a woman named Maja, the wife of a fisherman, who struggles with a hard life and living in a patriarchical society. The Stormskärs-Maja novels were adapted for a popular television series in 1975. After the last novel in the series, Vägen från Stormskäret, was published in 1973, she began collaborating with Stig Jaatinen of Helsinki University on a study of the people and community on the Åland Islands. This study was published as Simskäla in 1977.

Anna Beata, the first novel in the Anna Beata trilogy, was published in 1979. The stories were partially based on the life of her maternal grandmother.

In 1987, her son Bengt drowned. She wrote about this tragedy in the autobiographical Havet finns inte mer, published in 1989.

== Death and legacy ==
Blomqvist died in her home. She lived her entire life and died in Vårdö. Her home can now be visited by groups on request, and yearly scholarship is awarded in her name.

Anni Blomqvist is featured on a stamp issued on 21 March 2009 by the postal authority of Åland. The stamp, by the artist Juha Pykäläinen, is a portrait of Blomqvist next to a depiction of a traditional Åland house, the motif coming from her Stormskärs-Maja novels. The stamp is part of a stamp booklet called Åland Authors, and also includes a stamp featuring Ulla-Lena Lundberg and a stamp featuring Valdemar Nyman.

== Bibliography ==
=== Fictional ===
- I stormens spår (1967)
- I nöd och lust (1978)

==== Stormskärs-Maja series ====
- Vägen till Stormskäret (1968)
- Med havet som granne (1969)
- Maja (1970)
- I kamp med havet (1971)
- Vägen från Stormskäret (1973)

==== Anna Beata trilogy ====
- Anna Beata (1979)
- Anna Beata möter kärleken (1981)
- Anna Beata får ett eget hem (1983)

=== Autobiographical and factual ===
- Simskäla (1977) (with Stig Jaatinen)
- Vandring i barndomslandet (1986)
- Havet finns inte mer (1989)
