= Long Good Thursday =

- Theatrical release poster
- Directed by: Mika Kaurismäki
- Written by: Sami Keski-Vähälä
- Based on: Mielensäpahoittajan rakkaustarina by Tuomas Kyrö (2022)
- Produced by: Hanna Virolainen; Markus Selin; Jukka Helle
- Starring: Heikki Kinnunen; Jaana Saarinen; Iikka Forss; Ville Tiihonen
- Cinematography: Jari Mutikainen
- Edited by: Nina Ijäs
- Music by: Tetsuroh Konishi
- Production company: Solar Films
- Distributed by: Nordisk Film
- Release date: 6 September 2024
- Running time: 98 minutes
- Country: Finland
- Language: Finnish
- Budget: €1,440,000 (with €500,000 support from the Finnish Film Foundation)

Long Good Thursday (Finnish: Mielensäpahoittajan rakkaustarina, literally The Grump's Love Story) is a 2024 Finnish comedy film directed by Mika Kaurismäki.

The film is based on Tuomas Kyrö's novel of the same name and was adapted for the screen by Sami Keski-Vähälä. Filming began in September 2023, taking place in the Helsinki metropolitan area and Uusimaa region.

Heikki Kinnunen reprised his role as the Grump, while Jaana Saarinen portrayed Saimi, the object of his affection.

The film is the fourth installment in The Grump film series and the second directed by Mika Kaurismäki. It is produced by Solar Films and distributed by Nordisk Film.
