= Heikki Kinnunen =

Finnish actor (born 1946)

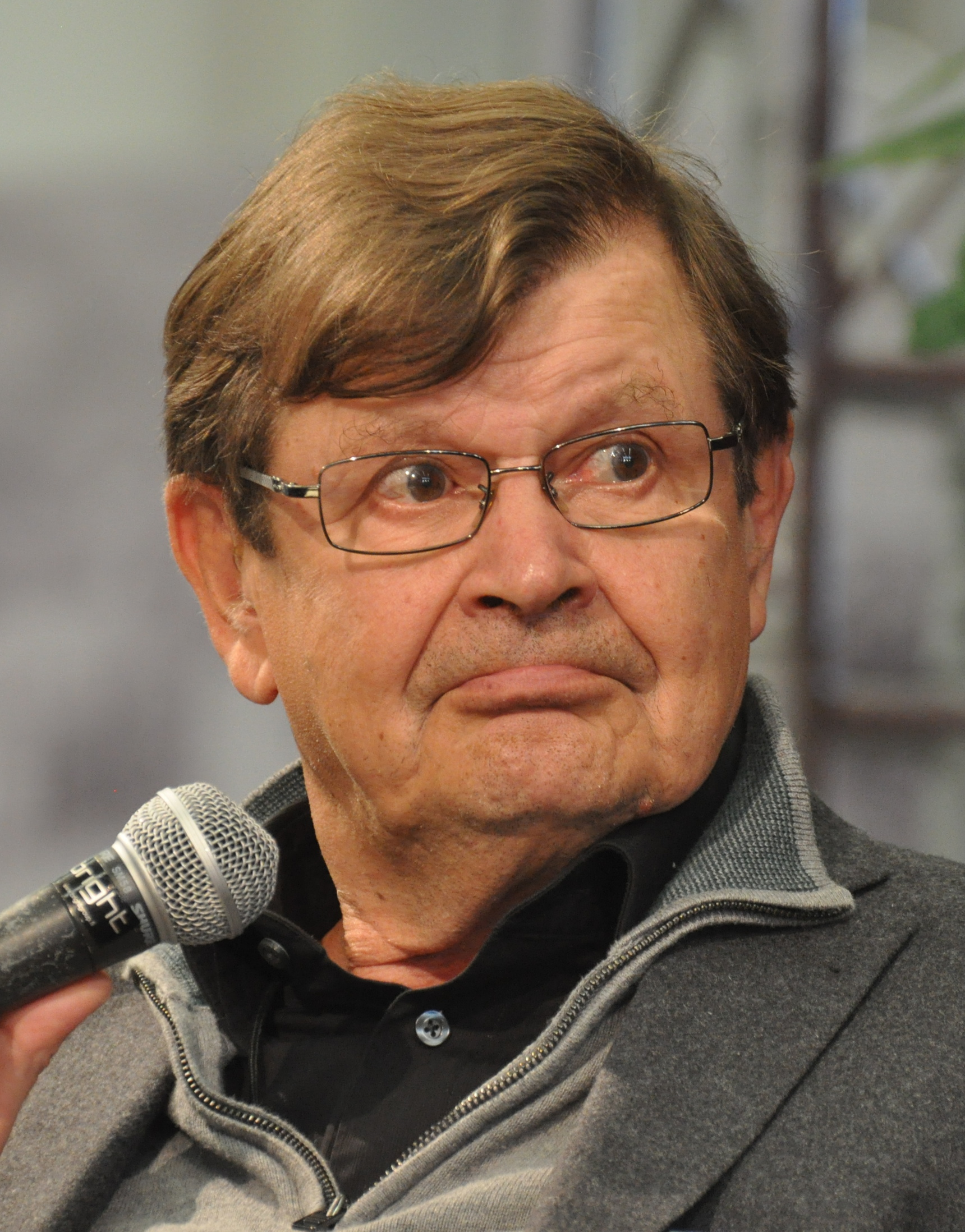
- Born: Heikki Pentti Ilmari Kinnunen; 8 April 1946 (age 79); Raahe, Finland
- Occupation: Actor

Heikki Pentti Ilmari Kinnunen (born 8 April 1946 in Raahe) is a Finnish actor, who became well known in the beginning of the 1970s in the comedy program Ällitälli. Kinnunen was known specially for his roles in comedy films and -series. He has played the leading role in Vääpeli Körmy films and appeared in five Uuno Turhapuro films.

Kinnunen's most famous comedic catch-phrase is "Onks Viljoo näkyny?" ("You seen Viljo?") born from a skit in which he shows up asking people this question then inquiring something about what they are currently doing. Who Viljo is or why Kinnunen's character is looking for him is never explained in the skits themselves.

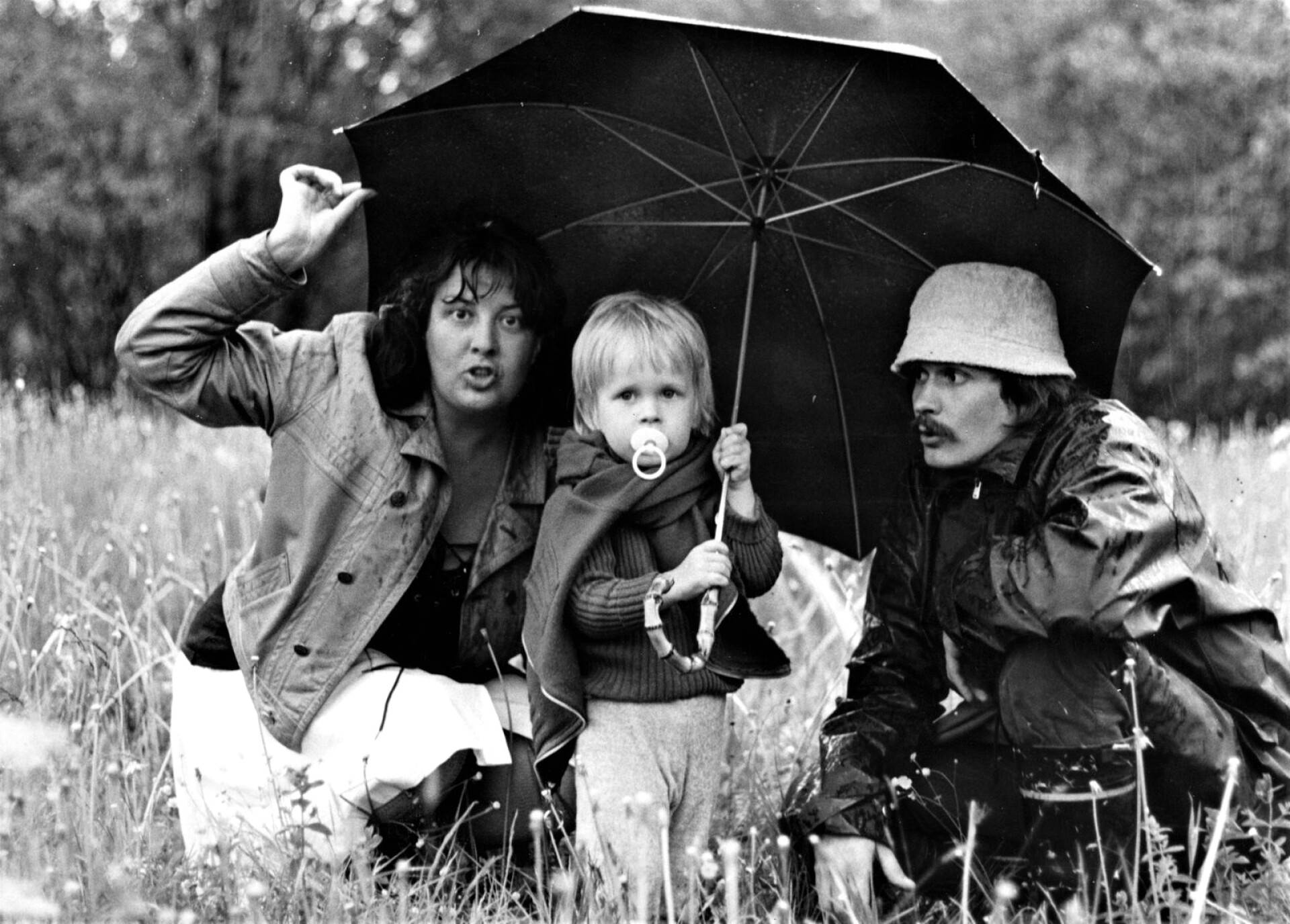
Kinnunen (right) with his wife Rose-Marie Precht (left) and their son Santeri (middle) in 1972.

His son Santeri Kinnunen is also an actor.

He is well-known for modern Finnish audiences for starring in The Grump sequels.

== Films ==
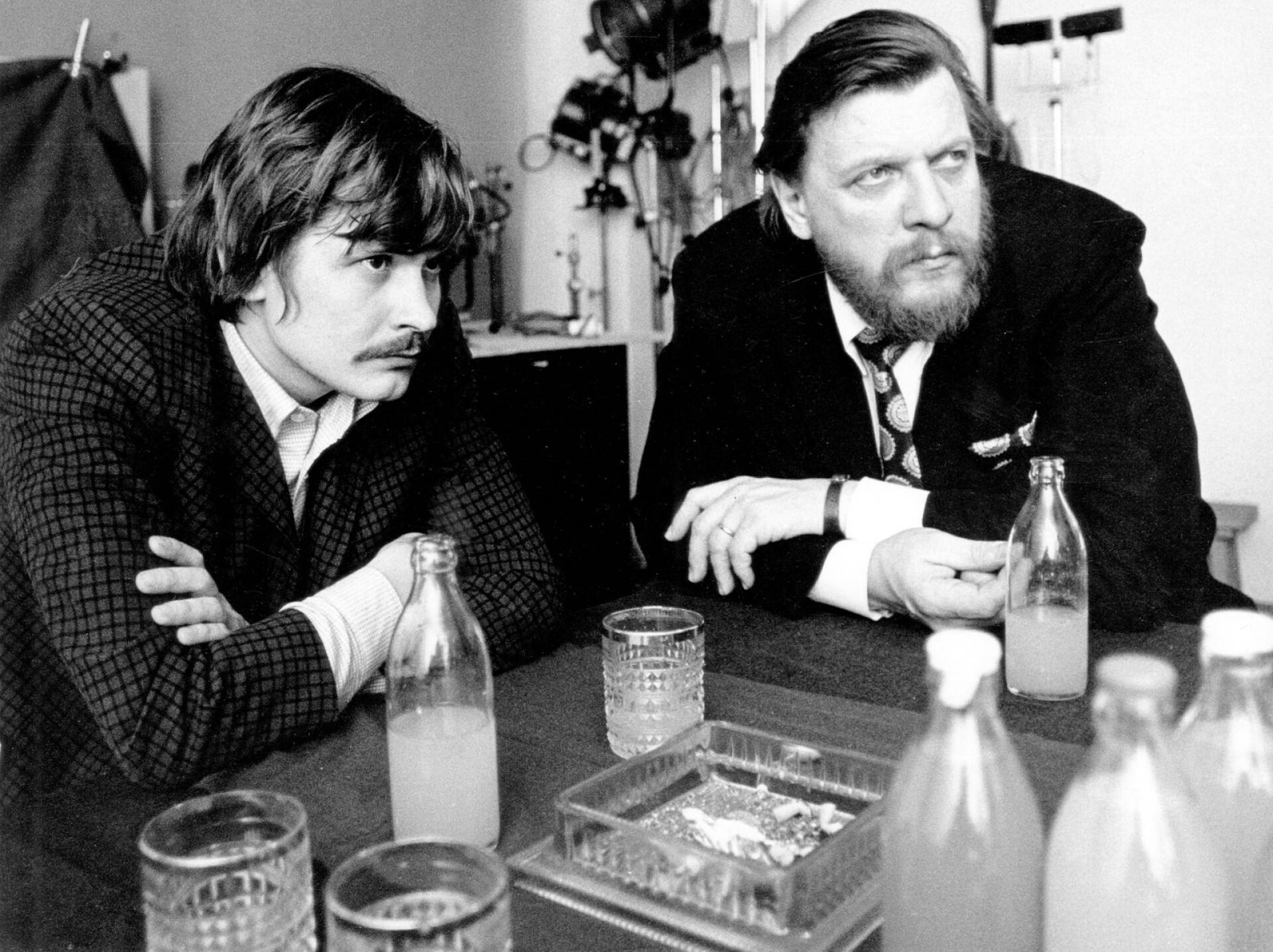
Heikki Kinnunen and Leo Lastumäki

- Lapualaismorsian (1967) - Hessu
- Asfalttilampaat (1968)
- Täällä Pohjantähden alla (1968) - Valenti Leppänen
- Päämaja (1970)
- Aatamin puvussa ja vähän Eevankin (1971) - Heikki Himanen
- Lampaansyöjät (1972) - Sepe
- Pohjantähti (1973) - Valenti Leppänen
- Tup-akka-lakko (1980) - postman aka alias Interpol agent/teller
- Pölhölä (1981) - Kalevi Käppyrä/Äijänkäppyrä
- Kuningas jolla ei ollut sydäntä (1982) - Prime Minister
- Koomikko (1983) -
- Regina ja miehet (1983) - Raimo Harjanne
- Uuno Turhapuron muisti palailee pätkittäin (1983) - waiter
- Lentävät luupäät (1984) - Mr. Smith
- Kun Hunttalan Matti Suomen osti (1984)
- Pikkupojat (1986) - teller
- Onks' Viljoo näkyny? (1988) - Uffa Hintman/Vähänen/constable Unto Kutvonen/man who asking after ViljoViljoa kyselevä mies/Urho
- Uuno Turhapuro – kaksoisagentti (1987) - police
- Vääpeli Körmy ja marsalkan sauva (1990) - sergeant-major Körmy
- Uuno Turhapuro herra Helsingin herra (1991) - sergeant-major Körmy
- Vääpeli Körmy ja vetenalaiset vehkeet (1991) - sergeant-major Körmy
- Vääpeli Körmy ja etelän hetelmät (1992) - sergeant-major Körmy
- Romanovin kivet (1993)
- Vääpeli Körmy: Taisteluni – Min Kampp (1994) - sergeant-major Körmy
- Uuno Turhapuron veli (1994)
- Paratiisin lapset (1994)
- Vääpeli Körmy ja kahtesti laukeava (1997) - sergeant-major Körmy
- Johtaja Uuno Turhapuro - pisnismies (1998) - singing boozer
- Hurmaava joukkoitsemurha (2000) - Hermanni Kemppainen
- Uuno Turhapuro - This Is My Life (2004) - former banker
- Pelikaanimies (2004) - postman
- Lieksa! (2007)
- Kummeli V (2014)
- Happier Times, Grump (2018) - The Grump
- The Grump: In Search of an Escort (2022) - The Grump
- Long Good Thursday (2024) - The Grump

== TV-movies ==
- Kuolleista herännyt (1975) - Antti Tanakka
- Seitsemän veljestä (1976) - Aapo
- Muistoja Elmosta (1981) - Immo
- Isku vasten kasvoja (1988)
- Jumalia ei uhmata (1988) - Huhtanen
- Keskiyön aurinko (1991)
- Hamlet (1992) - Hamlet
- Palava rakkaus (1997) - Oskar Kallas
- Ilmalaiva Finlandia (2000)
- Paavo Pantteri (2002)

== TV-series ==
- Kunnon sotamies Svejkin seikkailuja (1968)
- Ällitälli (1971) - many roles
- Merirosvoradio (1974) - many roles
- Parempi myöhään... (1979) - charts singer
- Valehtelijoiden klubi (1981–1983) (scriptwriter)
- ÄWPK - Älywapaa palokunta (1984–1985) - many roles
- Soitinmenot (1985–1987) - many roles
- Kissa vieköön (1987–1988) - many roles
- Heksa ja Leksa (1989–1991) - many roles
- Lentsu (1990) - teller, voice of the virus
- Kolmannen korvapuusti (1993–1994)
- Pudonneita (1994) - shopkeeper
- Konstan Pylkkerö (1994) - Konsta Pylkkänen
- Jäitä hattuun! (1994–1995) - many roles
- Lihaksia ja luoteja (1996) - Hautala
- Uuno Turhapuro (1996) - deliverer
- Olen Finni (1997) - many roles
- Tunteen palo (1999–2000) - Jussi Juntunen
- Kaverille ei jätetä (2000)
- Tummien vesien tulkit (2002) - Heikki Kinnunen
- Paavo ja Raili (2006) - Risto Kujansuu
- Karjalan kunnailla (2007–2012)
- Rakkautta vain (2017)
- Kontio & Parmas (2018)
- Mielensäpahoittaja: ennen kaikki oli paremmin (2019) - Mielensäpahoittaja
