= Tiina Lymi =

Finnish actress and filmmaker (born 1971)

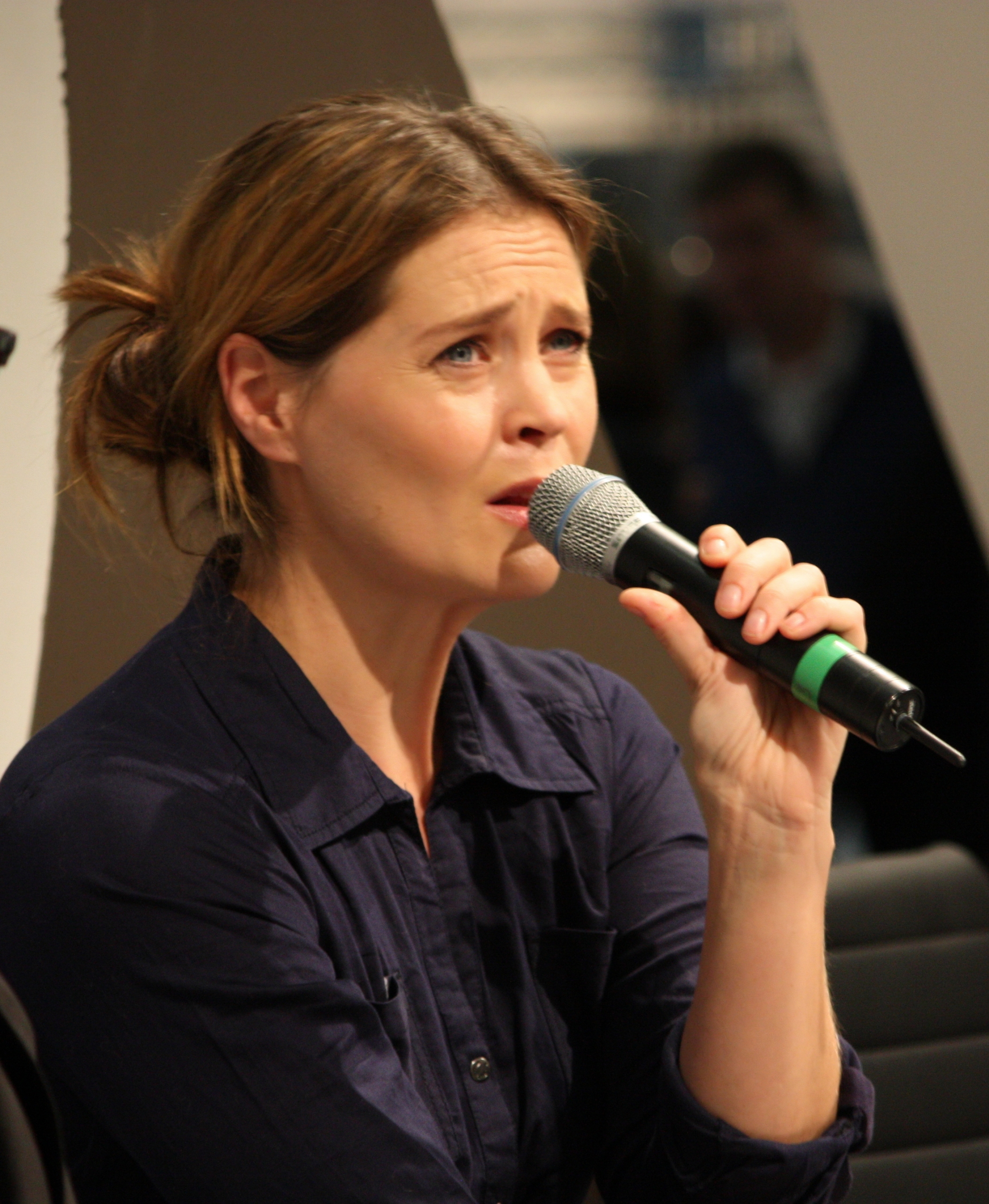
- Lymi in 2010
- Born: 3 September 1971 (age 55); Tampere, Finland
- Occupations: Actress, theatre and film director, playwright, screenwriter, author
- Children: 3
- Awards: Jussi Award for Best Actress, Jussi Award for Best Director

Tiina Lymi (born 3 September 1971) is a Finnish actress, director, playwright, screenwriter, and author. She received a Jussi Award for Best Actress for her work in the 1993 film Akvaariorakkaus. She is also known for directing historical drama film Stormskerry Maja (2024) and the hit comedy drama TV series Queen of Fucking Everything (2025).

== Early life and education ==
Tiina Lymi was born on 3 September 1971 in Tampere, Finland and grew up with her single mother. She went to the Tampere University High School.

== Career ==
Lymi is an actress, director, screenwriter, and author. She had her first film role in 1993 in Akvaariorakkaus, receiving the Jussi Award for Best Actress. After spending time working in theatre and on TV in the early 2000s, she starred in the comedy film Nousukausi (2003), directed by Johanna Vuoksenmaa in her directorial debut feature. She went on to have roles in Veikko Aaltonen's dark tragicomedy Trench Road (Juoksuhaudantie, 2004); and Aikuisten oikeesti (2005), among many other films and series.

From 2012 she has starred in the long-running police crime drama Roba, and appeared in the films Love and Other Troubles (Hulluna Saraan, 2012) and Armi elää! (2015). Lymi has written a column for the daily Tampere newspaper, Aamulehti, and in 2008 started writing for the national newspaper Ilta-Sanomat's TV magazine.

She said in a 2026 interview that she had been an actress, performing on stage and screen, for 25 years in Finland, before realising that it was not what she wanted to do. She then started writing plays for theatre and directing both five of her own plays and directing eight written by others, she started to write and direct for camera. She said that writing and directing are "a symbiosis in [her] head".

She wrote and directed Stormskerry Maja (2024), a Finnish historical drama film adapted from Anni Blomqvist's book series.

In 2025, Lymi wrote and directed the hit comedy drama TV series Queen of Fucking Everything, starring Laura Malmivaara, Katja Küttner, and Minna Haapkylä. The Rabbit Films production, which was commissioned by Finnish national broadcaster YLE, was sold to channels across Europe before its global premiere at Content London, including ZDF (Germany), NPO (Netherlands), VRT (Belgium), NRK (Norway), and RÚV (Iceland). It went on to be screened on other channels and streaming services around the world, including Rialto Channel in New Zealand, SBS on Demand in Australia, and Apple TV. The series has been described as "Finnish female version of Breaking Bad, albeit with a more satirical edge". Lymi said that the idea for the series, which follows a wealthy woman who is drawn into a life of crime after her husband has gone missing and she finds herself in debt, had arisen from a personal experience she had had years before, leading her to "think about the justification of your own anger, disappointment or bitterness".

In January 2026, Lymi was working on the development of a feature film based on one of the characters in Queen of Fucking Everything, with the ironic title King of Fucking Everything, having co-written the script with Juha Lehtola of East Film. There is also a second season of the series under way, and Lymi is working on a new series that she has written under the working title Guardian Angel, also with a central female character.

== Awards and nominations ==
Lymi received a Jussi Award for Best Actress for her work in the 1993 film Akvaariorakkaus.

Her 2024 film Stormskerry Maja was nominated for nine Jussi Awards, winning six, including the Jussi Award for Best Director for Lymi.

Queen of Fucking Everything (2025) won five awards in the Golden Venla TV awards, was nominated for the 2026 Nordic Script Award

== Personal life ==
Lymi was married for 12 years to actor Eero Aho until 2006. They have two daughters, Iida (1994) and Ella (1997). Iida has appeared in the film Joki and Ella together with their parents in the film Juoksuhaudantie and in the film Käsky. Ella entered the Theater Academy in 2018 and is also studying to be an actress. During their careers, Lymi and Aho often performed together in other contexts, such as in the KOM theater and television series Vuoroin vieraissa. In 2008, she had a son with Aleksi Seppänen.

== Selected filmography ==
=== Actor ===
- Akvaariorakkaus (1992)
- Nousukausi (2003)
- Juoksuhaudantie (2004)
- Aikuisten oikeesti (2005)
- Hulluna Saraan (2012)
- Armi elää! (2015)

=== Director ===
- Happier Times, Grump (2018)
- Sisäilmaa (television series, 2021)
- Stormskerry Maja (2024)
- Queen of Fucking Everything (television series, 2025)
