= Kari Hotakainen =

Finnish writer (born 1957)

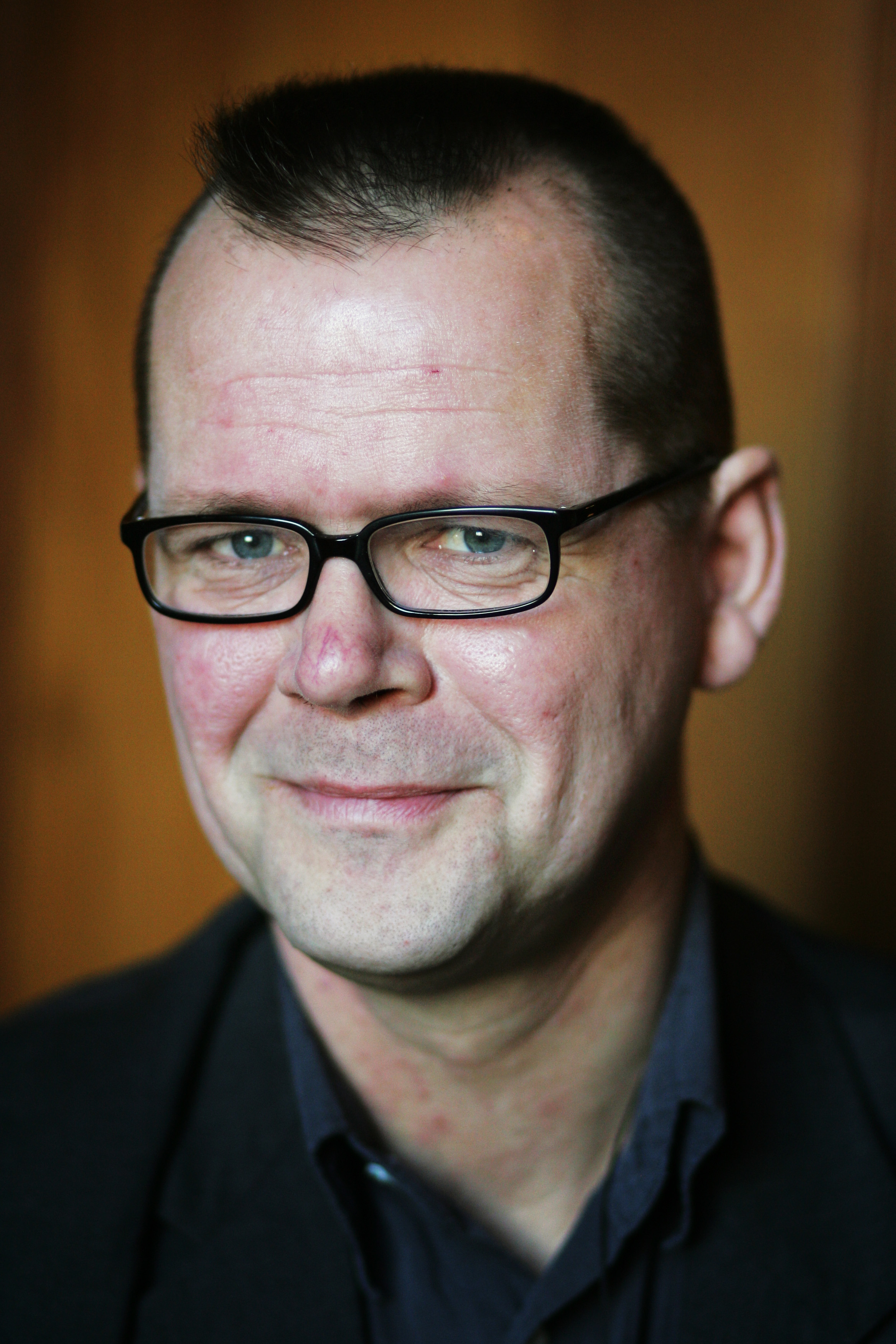
Kari Hotakainen

Kari Hotakainen (born 9 January 1957 in Pori, Finland) is a Finnish writer. Hotakainen started his writing career as a reporter in Pori. In 1986, he moved to Helsinki. He became a full-time writer in 1996. He has two children with his wife, sound technician Tarja Laaksonen, whom he married in 1983. He has also worked as a copywriter and as a columnist for the Helsingin Sanomat.

== Life and career ==
His father, Keijo Hotakainen, worked as a storekeeper and photographer while his mother, Meeri Ala-Kuusisto, worked as a sales clerk. Kari Hotakainen passed his matriculation examination in 1976 and graduated from Rautalampi High School the same year. He has a Bachelor of Arts.

Hotakainen kicked off his career as an author in the beginning of the 1980s by writing poetry. His debut collection Harmittavat takaiskut (Unfortunate setbacks) was published in 1982. From poetry, Hotakainen moved on to writing books for children and young adults and then on to writing novels for adults. Before he started writing full-time, Hotakainen worked as a news reporter, in the advertising department of WSOY, etc. Hotakainen's breakthrough came when he was nominated for the 1997 Finlandia Prize, for his semi-autobiographical work titled Klassikko (The Classic). In 2002, Hotakainen received the Finlandia Prize for his book titled Juoksuhaudantie (Battle Trench Avenue) published the same year. Later on, the book was turned into a movie with the same name. In 2004, Hotakainen received the Nordic Council's Literature Prize for the same book. In 2006, he received the Nordic Drama Award for his play Punahukka. Hotakainen has also written children's plays, radio dramas, newspaper columns and the scripts for a 10-part TV series titled Tummien vesien tulkit.

Hotakainen was seriously injured in a car accident on 3 March 2012.

== Bibliography ==
=== Novels ===
- Buster Keaton: elämä ja teot (1991)
- Bronks (1993)
- Syntisäkki (1995)
- Pariskunta, pukki ja pieni mies (1997)
- Klassikko (1997)
- Sydänkohtauksia, eli kuinka tehtiin Kummisetä (1999)
- Juoksuhaudantie (2002) – Finlandia Prize winner 2002
- Iisakin kirkko (2004)
- Huolimattomat (2006) – nominated for the Finlandia Prize 2006.
- Ihmisen osa (2009)

=== Poetry ===
- Harmittavat takaiskut (1982)
- Kuka pelkää mustaa miestä (1985)
- Hot (1987)
- Runokirja (1988)
- Kalikkakasa, kootut runot (2000)

=== Children's and young adults' books ===
- Lastenkirja (1990)
- Ritva (1997)
- Näytän hyvältä ilman paitaa (2000)
- Satukirja (2004)

=== Radio dramas ===
- Puutteellinen (1996)
- Hurmaus (1997)
- Keihäänheittäjä (1997)
- Tulisuihku (1999)
- Sitten kun kaikki on ohi (2000)

=== Plays ===
- Hukassa on hyvä paikka (1999)
- Sydänkohtauksia (2002)
- Punahukka (2005)

=== TV series ===
- Tummien vesien tulkit

Awards
Preceded by Sofi Oksanen	Winner of the Runeberg Prize; 2010	Succeeded by Tiina Raevaara
