= Tuomas Kyrö =

Finnish author and cartoonist

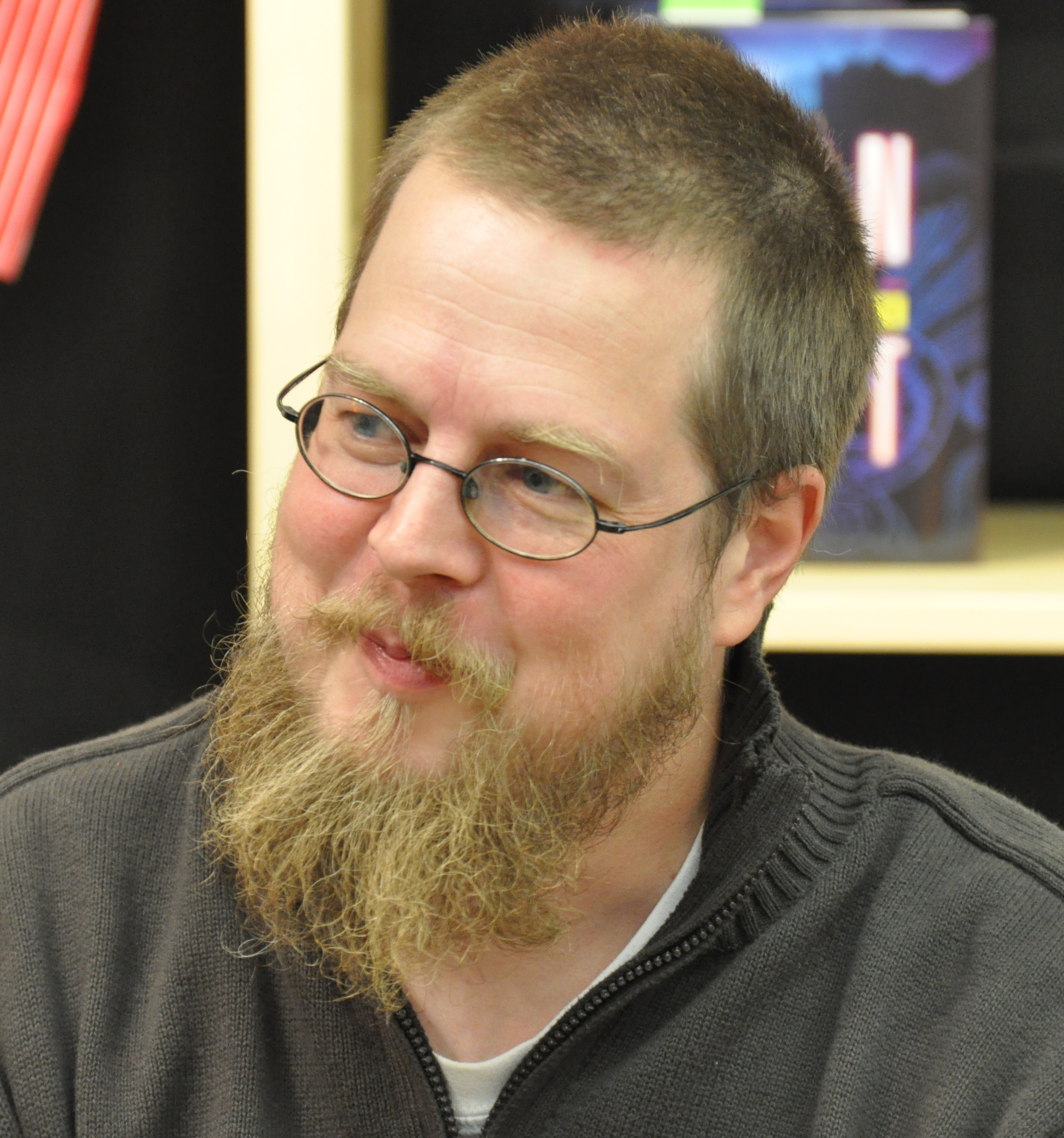
Tuomas Kyrö

Tuomas Kyrö (born June 4, 1974, in Helsinki) is a Finnish author and cartoonist. He has written novels, columns, causeries and plays and drawn comics and cartoons.

Kyrö has received a prize from the Kalevi Jäntti Foundation in 2005 and the Young Aleksis Prize in 2006. His novel Liitto was a candidate for the Finlandia Prize in literature in 2005. The Finnish Sports Museum Foundation chose the book Urheilukirja (‘Sports Book’) as the Sports Book of the Year in 2011.

Kyrö's book Mielensäpahoittaja (‘The Man Who Gets Upset About Things’) appeared in 2010, and it was based on the radio drama series with the same title, broadcast by YLE in Radio Suomi, in which Antti Litja played the key character.

Tuomas Kyrö was the first person to be granted residence in the Eeva Joenpelto authors’ home in 2005–2009. He lives in Janakkala, Finland, together with his family.

== Works ==
=== Novels ===
- Nahkatakki (‘Leather Jacket’). WSOY, Helsinki, 2001. ISBN 951-026-163-7
- Tilkka. WSOY, Helsinki, 2003. ISBN 951-028-318-5
- Liitto (‘Union’). WSOY, Helsinki, 2005. ISBN 951-030-891-9
- Benjamin Kivi (‘Benjamin's Stone’). WSOY, Helsinki, 2007. ISBN 978-951-033-399-0
- 700 grammaa (‘700 Grams’). WSOY, Helsinki, 2009. ISBN 978-951-035-601-2
- Mielensäpahoittaja. WSOY, Helsinki, 2010. ISBN 978-951-036-626-4
- Kerjäläinen ja jänis (‘The Beggar and the Hare’). Siltala, Helsinki, 2011. ISBN 978-952-234-068-9
- Kyrö, Tuomas & Kyrö, Antti: Pukin paha päivä (‘A Bad Day for Santa’). WSOY, Helsinki, 2011. ISBN 978-951-038-235-6
- Miniä (‘Daughter-in-Law’). Kirjakauppaliitto, Helsinki, 2012. ISBN 978-952-677-050-5
- Mielensäpahoittaja ja ruskeakastike. WSOY, Helsinki, 2012. ISBN 978-951-039-079-5
- Kyrö, Tuomas & Kyrö, Antti: Pukki laivalla. WSOY, Helsinki, 2012. ISBN 978-951-039-303-1
- Kunkku ('The King'). Siltala, Helsinki, 2013. ISBN 978-952-234-173-0.
- Ilosia aikoja, mielensäpahoittaja. WSOY, Helsinki, 2014. ISBN 978-951-0-40762-2.

=== Other works ===
- Taide ja tolkku (‘Art and Reason’). WSOY, Helsinki, 2008. ISBN 978-951-034-532-0
- Urheilukirja (‘A Sports Book’). Helsinki, Teos, 2011. ISBN 978-951-851-337-0

== Sources ==
- WSOY’s authors
- Authors on Vantaa City Library’s website
