= Pump Up the Volume (song) =

1987 single by M|A|R|R|S

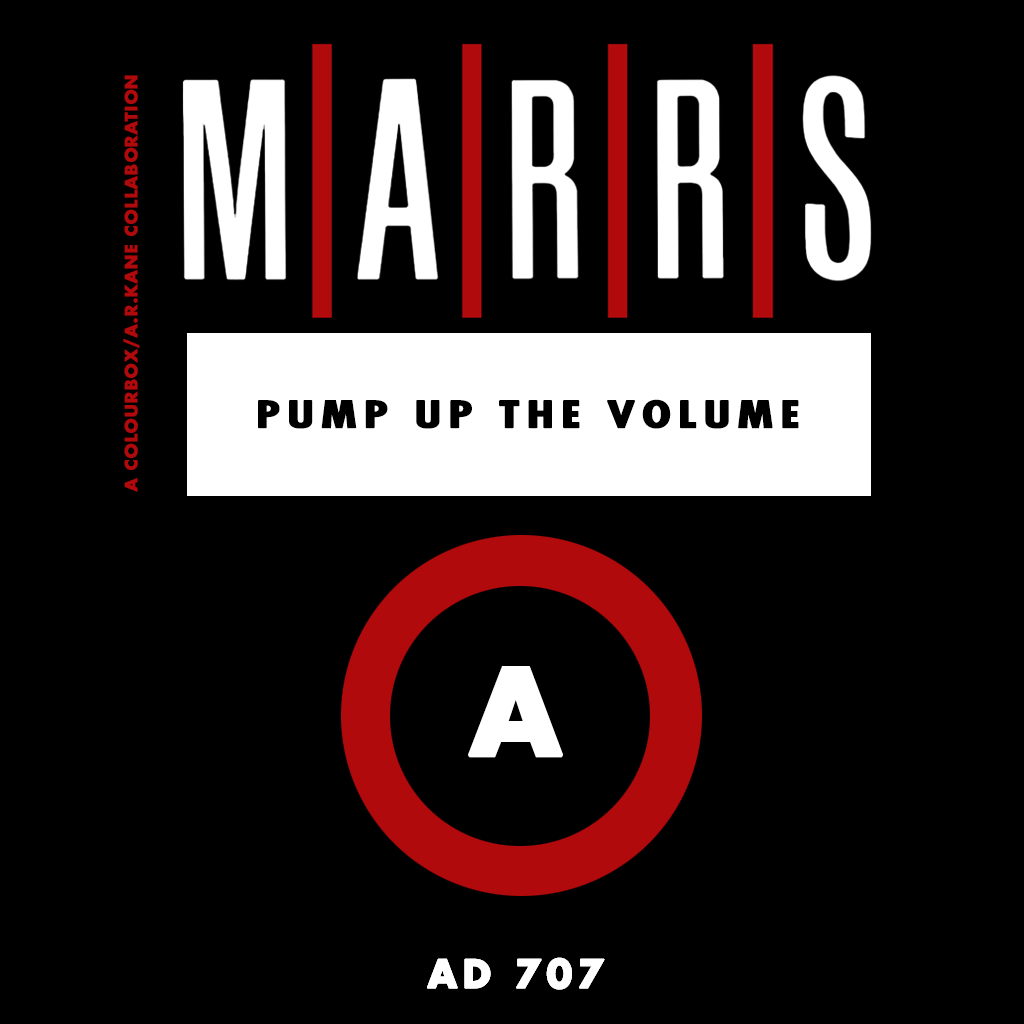

Single by M|A|R|R|S
- B-side: "Anitina (The First Time I See She Dance)"
- Released: 3 August 1987
- Recorded: 1987
- Genre: Hip hop; hip house
- Length: 4:08 (7-inch/video edit); 6:28 (12-inch mix)
- Label: 4AD
- Songwriters: Martyn Young; Steve Young
- Producers: John Fryer; Martyn Young

Audio sample
- file; help

Music video
- "Pump Up the Volume" on YouTube

"Pump Up the Volume" is the only single by British recording act M|A|R|R|S. The song was written by Martyn Young and Steve Young, and produced by the former and John Fryer. It was recorded in 1987 and released on 3 August of the same year. The song was a number-one hit in several countries and is regarded as a significant milestone in the development of British house music and music sampling. The song derives its title directly from a lyrical sample from "I Know You Got Soul", a hit single by Eric B. & Rakim, released months prior in that same year.

The single was the product of an uneasy collaboration between electronic group Colourbox and dream pop band A.R. Kane, two groups signed to the independent label 4AD. The A-side was written primarily by Colourbox, while the B-side "Anitina" was primarily an A.R. Kane creation. The link-up was suggested by label founder Ivo Watts-Russell after the two groups had independently suggested the possibility of releasing a commercial dance record, inspired by the American house music that was starting to make an impact on the UK chart.

== Background ==
A.R. Kane had released an E.P. entitled When You're Sad on One Little Indian Records in late 1986. Frustrated by the lack of support from One Little Indian, Alex Ayuli of the band approached 4AD owner Ivo Watts-Russell to see if his label would take them on. Derek Birkett, the owner of One Little Indian, was under the impression that 4AD were trying to poach his band, and, along with label designer Paul White and Einar Örn Benediktsson from the Sugarcubes, visited the 4AD offices in Alma Road to confront Watts-Russell. Colin Wallace, a 4AD staff member, convened a team from the warehouse to support Watts-Russell. Despite a heated argument in which a furious Birkett told Watts-Russell "You don't do that. You fucking stole my fucking band," A.R. Kane signed to 4AD for a one-off release. Following the release of the Lollita EP, the band voiced their disappointment with One Little Indian, who had failed to deliver on a promise that A.R. Kane could work with producer Adrian Sherwood. Watts-Russell suggested that they instead work with Martyn Young of Colourbox.

== Production ==
The collaboration between the two groups did not go entirely to plan. Once in the studio, the groups' different working methods and personalities failed to gel. Producer John Fryer found himself in the middle and unable to resolve the conflict. The result was that instead of working together, the groups ended up recording a track each, then exchanging them to the other for additional input. Colourbox came up with "Pump Up the Volume", a percussion-led near-instrumental, featuring an Eric B. & Rakim sample that gave it its title, while A.R. Kane created the more deliberately arty "Anitina (The First Time I See She Dance)" in another studio. Colourbox then added a heavy drum-machine rhythm and effects to "Anitina" and A.R. Kane overdubbed some additional guitar to "Pump Up the Volume". The coup de grace, however, was the addition of scratch mix effects and samples by DJs Chris "C.J." Mackintosh and Dave Dorrell. Colourbox told Watts-Russell that they did not want "Anitina" on the B-side and wanted "Pump Up the Volume" released solely as a Colourbox track. Watts-Russell overruled them, in part because of Young's notoriously slow work rate with the prospect of the track being held up for another 12 to 18 months, and released the track as M|A|R|R|S as originally planned.

The two tracks were released to United Kingdom dance clubs in July 1987, on an anonymous white label with no artist credit. "Pump Up the Volume" proved to be the more popular side and was the track more heavily promoted. 4AD released the 12" single (as, officially, a double A-side) on 24 August of that year. It entered the UK Singles Chart the following week at number 35, a strong initial showing for an unknown act, especially with 12" sales. However, what gave "Pump Up the Volume" its commercial edge was the remix released a week later. This remix became the best-known version of the track, transforming it by the addition of numerous samples that provided the record with additional hooks besides its oft-repeated title chant, such as those of tracks by Public Enemy, Criminal Element Orchestra and the Bar-Kays. It was this remix, rather than the original, that was edited down to create the 7-inch version of the track, which began picking up radio play.

As the record climbed the charts, the single ran into legal difficulties. With "Pump Up the Volume" standing at number two, an injunction was obtained against it by pop music producers Stock Aitken Waterman (SAW), who objected to the use of a sample from their hit single "Roadblock". Distribution was held up for several days while negotiations took place, and the result was that overseas releases would not include the "Roadblock" sample. Dorrell later stated that he believed SAW would never have noticed the highly distorted sample had he not rashly boasted about it in a radio interview. The offending article consisted of seven seconds of an anonymous background voice moaning the single word "hey", involved no musical or melodic information and could never be considered plagiarism in the literary sense. SAW member Pete Waterman wrote an open letter to the music press calling such things "wholesale theft". Some publications were quick to point out that Waterman was currently using the bassline from the Colonel Abrams song "Trapped" in his production of Rick Astley's "Never Gonna Give You Up", which was competing in close proximity to "Pump Up the Volume" in the pop charts. Observers suggested that SAW's motives had just as much to do with extending the run of "Never Gonna Give You Up" at the top of the chart. SAW could afford extensive legal resources and M|A|R|R|S stood little chance of a successful defence. Despite all this, "Pump Up the Volume" went on to spend two weeks at number one in October 1987 and was a chart hit in many other countries, receiving considerable airplay on American, Australian and European airwaves. While the offending "Roadblock" sample was stripped from the official American release, the version containing it reached the Australian charts. In the U.S., where the song was licensed to 4th & B'way Records, the original version contained several samples from previous 4th & B'way releases, and the label was able to provide clearance for new samples for the American version.

== Legacy and influence ==
As one of the first big British-made house hits, "Pump Up the Volume" marked a turning point in the popularity of the genre. Eric B. & Rakim's "Paid in Full", which had been released prior to the M|A|R|R|S track, also hit the top 20 in November, and both singles borrowed heavily from Coldcut's previous UK chart success "Say Kids What Time Is It?". This was a very rapid response, as "Pump Up the Volume" seemed to catch the record industry off-guard. It was not until February 1988, four months after "Pump Up the Volume" reached the top ten, that the floodgates truly opened. Like "Pump Up the Volume", many of the first major wave of British house hits were on independent labels, and many of these were obviously influenced by M|A|R|R|S.

While Two Men, a Drum Machine and a Trumpet's "Tired of Getting Pushed Around", one of the first such hits, was principally just a dance groove with minimal use of samples, it was the sampling angle that made most impact on the public consciousness in the short term. Among the hits clearly following in M|A|R|R|S's footsteps were "Beat Dis" by Bomb the Bass, "Bass (How Low Can You Go?)" by Simon Harris, "Theme from S-Express" by S'Express and "Doctorin' the House" by Coldcut featuring Yazz and the Plastic Population. These in turn spawned imitators from across Europe and the U.S. The sample montage craze would soon burn itself out, since many of the later records relied heavily on recycling the same samples already heard on the aforementioned hits, especially noticeable on Tolga Flim Flam Balkan's "Best of Joint Mix". Litigation would also play its part, and the adage "Where there's a hit — there's a writ" was coined as both house and hip hop artists underwent a period of legal trouble for using unlicensed samples in their recordings. The sampling style was also being parodied, notably by Star Turn on 45 (Pints) with their UK number 12 hit "Pump Up the Bitter", and by Harry Enfield's "Loadsamoney" single (produced by a young William Orbit). Les Adams also released "Check This Out" under the LA Mix moniker—a record that replayed "Pump Up the Volume" and "This is a journey into sound" soundbites before a male voice yells, "Oh not again! Get off!" Tastes started to change and acid house started to dominate the charts.

M|A|R|R|S themselves never came close to recording again. A.R. Kane gave interviews to the music press in which they explained that while they were proud to have been part of M|A|R|R|S, it was not an experience that they were keen to repeat. They were particularly unhappy at having their contribution to "Pump Up the Volume" all but removed from the track. Colourbox attempted to carry on using the name M|A|R|R|S, but were not willing to pay the £100,000 that A.R. Kane wanted for full rights to the name, and the project remained a one-off. Colourbox disbanded soon afterward, leaving "Pump Up the Volume" as their last original work. A.R. Kane continued, releasing the critically acclaimed though commercially unsuccessful albums 69 and i. However, neither album contains a track that could be considered a successor to "Pump Up the Volume".

Disco Mix Club Records, a British DJ pool and remix service, sought permission to remix "Pump Up the Volume" for several years. After continual setbacks resulting from the uneasy M|A|R|R|S collaboration, the organization gave up and released its own version in 1995 under "Greed featuring Ricardo da Force".

"Pump Up the Volume" was used during the late 1980s and early 1990s as the theme for Univision's boxing series Boxeo Budweiser.

In 1990, "Pump Up the Volume" became the theme song for the highly popular Finnish sketch comedy show Pulttibois, starring Pirkka-Pekka Petelius and Aake Kalliala.

"Pump Up the Volume" was featured on Just Dance 2 (2010) as a downloadable track but became unavailable for purchase following the shutdown of the Wii Shop Channel on 30 January 2019. It was also featured, and remains playable, on Just Dance: Summer Party.

=== Accolades ===
In 2004, Q magazine featured the song in their list of "The 1010 Songs You Must Own". In 2005, Stylus Magazine included its bassline at number 15 in their list of the "Top 50 Basslines of All Time". In 2006, Slant Magazine ranked it 32nd in its "100 Greatest Dance Songs" list, writing, "M/A/R/R/S's 'Pump Up the Volume', which took its title sample from an Erik B. & Rakim song, was a milestone in the world of sampling culture, snatching bits of Criminal Element Orchestra's 'Put the Needle to the Record', old soul records (a few years before Josh Davis hit the dustbins), and Ofra Haza's 'Im Nin'alu' (long before Kanye [West] played his 45s at the wrong speed)... A one-off collaboration between British indie label 4AD's Colourbox and A.R. Kane and DJs C.J. Mackintosh and Dave Dorrell, the track was a patently European interpretation of American house music and became the first big crossover U.K. house hit." In 2011, The Guardian featured the song in the "A History of Modern Music: Dance" playlist. In 2014, English DJ and music producer Duke Dumont ranked it number five in his list of "The 10 Best UK Number One Singles", saying, "Another sampling masterclass. UK dance music in this era was starting to take its influences from NY hip hop, as well as the likes of Frankie Goes To Hollywood and Trevor Horn. Those references can be heard in this." In 2020, Slant Magazine ranked it number 18 in their list of "The 100 Best Dance Songs of All Time". In 2024, Classic Pop ranked "Pump Up the Volume" number three in their "Top 20 80s House Hits" list.

== Samples used ==
The table below is a selected list of samples used in "Pump Up the Volume"; there also are indicators showing within which versions of the song each sample appears. Because of the song's legal history, samples used in the different US and UK versions vary.

Sampled track	Sampled portion	Original UK version	U.S. version/12" remix^{[A]}	UK radio edit	U.S. radio edit	Bonus Beats version	Original release
Afrika Bambaataa and James Brown, "Unity (Part Three - Nuclear Wildstyle)"	Repeated vocal sample ("Ah...")	Yes	Yes	Yes	Yes	No	Unity, 1984 (12")
The Bar-Kays, "Holy Ghost"	Drums, with moog (at the "put the needle..." part)	Yes	Yes	Yes	Yes	Yes	Holy Ghost, 1978 (12")
James Brown, "Super Bad (Part One)"	Vocal sample ("Watch me")	Yes	No	Yes	No	No	Super Bad, 1970 (12")
Tom Browne, "Funkin' for Jamaica (N.Y.)"	Trumpet	Yes	Yes	Yes	Yes	No	Love Approach, 1980 (LP)
Choice M.C.'s and Fresh Gordon, "Gordy's Groove"	Vocal sample ("Oh yeah")	No	Yes	No	No	Yes	Beat of the Street, 1985 (12")
Criminal Element Orchestra, "Put the Needle to the Record"	Vocal sample ("Put the needle on the record when the drum beats go like this")	Yes	Yes	Yes	Yes	No	Put the Needle to the Record, 1987 (12")
Eric B. & Rakim, "I Know You Got Soul (a cappella version)"	Vocal sample ("Pump up the volume, dance")	Yes	Yes	Yes	Yes	No	I Know You Got Soul, 1987 (12")
Fab 5 Freddy featuring Beeside, "Change le Beat"	Beep effect and distorted vocal sample ("Ah")	Yes	Yes	Yes	Yes	Yes	Street Music Material, 1984 (LP)
D.ST and Jalal Mansur Nuriddin, "Mean Machine"^{[B]}	Chanting ("Automatic, push-button, remote control; synthetic, genetics, command your soul.")	Yes	No	Yes	No	No	Mean Machine, 1984 (12")
Graham Central Station, "The Jam"	Drums and repeated vocal samples ("Hu, ha")	Yes	Yes	Yes	Yes	Yes	Ain't No 'Bout-a'Doubt It, 1975 (LP)
Jimmy Castor Bunch, "It's Just Begun"	Vocal sample ("It's just begun")	Yes	Yes	Yes	Yes	No	It's Just Begun, 1972 (LP)
Kool & the Gang, "Jungle Jazz"	Drums	Yes	Yes	Yes	Yes	No	Spirit of the Boogie, 1975 (LP)
George Kranz, "Din Daa Daa (Trommeltanz)"	Vocal sample ("Din daa daa...")	No	Yes	No	No	No	Din Daa Daa, 1983 (12")
Lovebug Starski and The Harlem World Crew, "Positive Life"	Vocal sample ("That's right, dude, this gotta be the greatest record of the year/Check it out")^{[C]}	Yes	No	Yes	No	No	Positive Life, 1981 (12")
Trailer to the 1968 film Mars Needs Women	Vocal sample ("Mars needs women")	No	Yes	No	No	Yes	
Montana Sextet, "Who Needs Enemies (With a Friend Like You)"	Vocals	Yes	No	No	No	No	Who Needs Enemies (With a Friend Like You), 1983 (LP)
Nuance, "Loveride"	Vocal sample ("Oh")	No	Yes	No	Yes	No	Stop, Dance, Rap, Romance, 1985 (LP)
Original Concept, "Pump That Bass"	Vocal sample ("Pump that bass")	Yes	Yes	Yes	Yes	No	Bite'n My Stylee, 1986 (12")
Pleasure, "Celebrate the Good Things"	Horn samples	Yes	Yes	Yes	Yes	No	Get to the Feeling, 1978 (LP)
Pressure Drop, "Rock the House (You'll Never Be)"	Vocal sample ("Rock the house")	Yes	Yes	No	No	No	Rock the House (You'll Never Be), 1983 (12")
Public Enemy, "You're Gonna Get Yours (My 98 Oldsmobile)"	Vocal sample ("You're gonna get yours")	Yes	Yes	Yes	Yes	No	Yo! Bum Rush the Show, 1987 (LP)
Run-DMC, "Here We Go (Live at the Funhouse)"	Vocal sample ("Aw, yeah")	Yes	Yes	No	No	No	Here We Go, 1985 (12")
The Soul Children, "I Don't Know What This World Is Coming To"	Vocal sample ("Brothers and sisters")	Yes	Yes	Yes	Yes	No	Wattstax: The Living Word, 1972 (LP)
Stock Aitken Waterman, "Roadblock (7" version)"	Vocal sample ("Hey") by Chyna (Coral Gordon) and sax sample by Gary Barnacle	Yes	No	No	No	No	Roadblock, 1986 (12")
Trouble Funk, "Pump Me Up"	Vocal sample ("Pump-pump me up")	Yes	Yes	Yes	Yes	No	Drop the Bomb, 1982 (LP)
Fred Wesley and The J.B.'s, "Introduction to the J.B.'s"	Vocal sample ("Without no doubt")	Yes	No	Yes	No	No	Doing It to Death, 1973 (LP)
Fred Wesley and The J.B.'s, "More Peas"	Vocal sample ("Yeah, yeah")	Yes	Yes	Yes	Yes	No	Doing It to Death, 1973 (LP)
Whistle, "(Nothing Serious) Just Buggin'"	Whistle sample	Yes	No	No	No	No	Whistle, 1986 (LP)
Dunya Yunis, "Abu Zeluf"	Vocals	Yes	Yes	Yes	Yes	Yes	Music in the World of Islam, 1: The Human Voice, 1976 (LP)

== Track listings ==
=== 4AD ===
- 12-inch single (BAD 707)
1. "Pump Up the Volume" – 5:07
2. "Anitina (The First Time I See She Dance)" – 6:38
- Remix 12-inch single (BAD 707R)
1. "Pump Up the Volume" (Remix) – 6:28
2. "Anitina (The First Time I See She Dance)" (Remix) – 7:29
- 7-inch single (AD 707)
1. "Pump Up the Volume" (Radio edit) – 4:06
2. "Anitina (The First Time I See She Dance)" (7" version)" – 5:02
- CD maxi single (BAD 707 CD)
1. "Pump Up the Volume" (Re-Mix) – 6:27
2. "Pump Up the Volume" – 5:07
3. "Anitina (The First Time I See She Dance)" – 6:39
4. "Anitina (The First Time I See She Dance)" (Remix) – 7:40
- US CD maxi single (AD 707 CD)
1. "Pump Up the Volume" (Radio edit) – 4:06
2. "Pump Up the Volume" – 7:10
3. "Anitina (The First Time I See She Dance)" – 6:39
4. "Pump Up the Volume" (Bonus Beats) – 4:49
5. "Pump Up the Volume" (Instrumental) – 5:07

=== 4th & Broadway ===
- US 7-inch single
1. "Pump Up the Volume" (Radio Edit) – 4:06
2. "Anitina" (Radio Edit) – 4:20

*Some copies state "in Bright Lights, Big City" on the A-side rather than "Radio Edit".

- US 12-inch single
1. "Pump Up the Volume" – 7:10
2. "Pump Up the Volume" (Bonus Beats) – 4:49
3. "Pump Up the Volume" (Instrumental) – 5:07
4. "Anitina (The First Time I See She Dance)" – 4:20
- US CD maxi single
1. "Pump Up the Volume" – 7:12
2. "Pump Up the Volume" (Bonus Beats) – 4:49
3. "Pump Up the Volume" (Instrumental) – 5:07
4. "Pump Up the Volume" (Radio Edit) – 4:06
5. "Anitina" – 4:20
- US cassette
1. "Pump Up the Volume" – 7:10
2. "Pump Up the Volume" (Bonus Beats) – 4:49
3. "Pump Up the Volume" (Instrumental) – 5:07
4. "Pump Up the Volume" (Radio Edit) – 4:06
5. "Anitina" – 4:20

== Charts ==
=== Weekly charts ===
Weekly chart performance for "Pump Up the Volume"
Chart (1987–1988)	Peak position
Australia (Australian Music Report)	6
Austria (Ö3 Austria Top 40)	4
Belgium (Ultratop 50 Flanders)	4
Canada Retail Singles (The Record)	1
Canada Top Singles (RPM)	1
Denmark (IFPI)	6
Finland (Suomen virallinen lista)	4
France (SNEP)	9
Ireland (IRMA)	5
Italy (Hit Parade)	1
Italy (Musica e dischi)	1
Italy Airplay (Music & Media)	20
Netherlands (Single Top 100)	2
Netherlands (Dutch Top 40)	1
New Zealand (Recorded Music NZ)	1
Spain (AFYVE)	6
Sweden (Sverigetopplistan)	14
Switzerland (Schweizer Hitparade)	3
UK Singles (Official Charts)	1
US Billboard Hot 100	13
US 12-inch Singles Sales (Billboard)	2
US Dance Club Play (Billboard)	1
US Hot Black Singles (Billboard)	8
US Cash Box Top 100	15
West Germany (GfK)	2
Zimbabwe (ZIMA)	1

=== Year-end charts ===
1987 year-end chart performance for "Pump Up the Volume"
Chart (1987)	Position
Belgium (Ultratop)	22
Europe (European Top 100 Singles)	47
Netherlands (Dutch Top 40)	10
Netherlands (Single Top 100)	19
UK Singles (OCC)	10

1988 year-end chart performance for "Pump Up the Volume"
Chart (1988)	Position
Canada Top Singles (RPM)	10
Europe (European Hot 100 Singles)	89
US 12-inch Singles Sales (Billboard)	4
US Dance Club Play (Billboard)	1
US Hot Black Singles (Billboard)	85

== Certifications ==
Certifications for "Pump Up the Volume"
Region	Certification	Certified units/sales
Canada (Music Canada)	Platinum	100,000^{^}
United Kingdom (BPI)	Silver	250,000^{^}
United States (RIAA)	Gold	1,000,000^{^}
^{^} Shipments figures based on certification alone.

== Notes ==
- A The 12" remix was branded as the song's original version in the U.S.
- B Chanting from "Mean Machine" is sampled directly in the UK version of "Pump Up the Volume"; however, the U.S. version of the song contains a slightly different rhyme recorded specially for the release by UK rapper E-mix.
- C The US radio edit replaces this sample with vocals by a female emcee saying: "Yo all you homeboys out in Bronx, this one's for you".
