= Tabu (TV series) =

Finnish television sketch show

Tabu was an eight-part, Finnish sketch comedy program produced and shown between 1986 and 1987. The series was produced for MTV3 by professional Helsinki actor-company Ryhmäteatteri.

The series had a troubled production history, suffering from low ratings and creative disagreements with Mainostelevisio. The series also departed from established skit-comedy shows of past with skits lasting up to several minutes, featuring multifaceted characters and frequently acts of violence, swearing, innuendo and other disturbing or chaotic material. MTV3 felt that Ryhmäteatteri had not produced the type of show they had hoped for which eventually led to censoring of swearwords from several episodes.

Despite its troubles, Tabu eventually won Venla awards in both 1986 and 1987, has enjoyed reruns on both MTV3 and SubTV as well as had a full DVD release.

The show was also an important early step for actors Aake Kalliala and Pirkka-Pekka Petelius working for MTV3, as they had previously worked for their competitor YLE and would go on create the break-out sketch show Pulttibois two years later.
