= Pulttibois =

- Herra 47 ("Mr 47" on the left, played by Pirkka-Pekka Petelius) trying to get into a restaurant. Aake Kalliala on the right.
- Created by: Pirkka-Pekka Petelius; Aake Kalliala
- Starring: Pirkka-Pekka Petelius; Aake Kalliala
- Country of origin: Finland
- Original language: Finnish
- No. of episodes: 58

Production
- Running time: approx. 22 minutes
- Production company: Spede-Yhtiöt

Original release
- Network: MTV3
- Release: 1989 – 1991

Pulttibois (Finglish for "Bolt Boys"; also a play on words of pultti pois – "to have a screw loose") was a popular Finnish sketch comedy television show that premiered on MTV3 in 1989 and which starred a two-man cast of comedic actors – Pirkka-Pekka Petelius and Aake Kalliala. Both Petelius and Kalliala had been previously known for their work on YLE sketch comedies during the 1980s. In Pulttibois, Petelius and Kalliala created a compilation of over-the-top sketches, eventually leading to a large cult following.

Three seasons of the show were made between 1989 and 1991, after which the show ended. It was succeeded by the similarly conceived, though less popular Manitbois.

The show can still be seen in reruns on MTV3 and SubTV and has been released on DVD.

== Comedy ==
Pulttibois featured characters that had been modified from those originated in Petelius and Kalliala's previous shows, such as the jolly drunk Laplanders, the overemotional gentlemen, the pair of gypsy boys and the unnecessarily loud pair of army officers but also emphasized original characters. The show's breakout character was the bizarre James Potkukelkka (played by Petelius) who would find himself panicking for some reason or another (such as getting stuck in a stopped escalator) and would require "rescuing" by the character played by Kalliala.

In addition, impersonations of celebrities, specifically musicians, were included in the form of lip-synching in front of a computer-generated background. The singers chosen for these impersonations ranged from popular Finnish artists of various eras to foreign (particularly American) artists and from the second season onwards would always be used as the bumper for the commercial breaks with the featured song usually reappearing over the credits.

== Production ==
The series' production was overseen and supported by Spede Pasanen. Due to Pasanen's insistence, overt swearing and adult humour was avoided, though occasional mild swearing and innuendo was used. The show was produced on a relatively low budget often utilizing whatever locations the film-crew was permitted to use and very frequently shooting skits against a blue screen background. The show's lip-sync segments most often featured computer generated backgrounds. In one such of the lip sync sketch, Kalliala lip-synched to the song Muistan sua Elaine, originally performed by Petelius during his stint on the popular YLE sketch show Velipuolikuu.

The show had a number of variations made to its intro as the program went on. The very earliest version of the intro had Petelius and Kalliala make their way to the studio while wearing sun-glasses, fedoras and trench-coats with the film sped up for comical effect. Two variants of the intro with the same music were shot, one in the Winter and one in early Spring. A third intro had the Petelius and Kalliala appear as ministers taking a helicopter ride back to their apartment to retrieve a misplaced box of matches. Starting with the show's second season, the theme song became MARRS' 1987 hit Pump up the Volume. This song was accompanied by Petelius and Kalliala dancing and doing physically silly things to the beat of the music as well as mouthing the lyrics "Brothers and sisters! Pump up the volume!" against a red background. Variants of this intro appeared all through the second and third seasons, including a reversed version of the intro and versions with still-images from past skits in-between Kalliala and Petelius dancing.

At the beginning of the show's third season the James Potkukelkka's yell was changed from apuva! to jelppivä derived from the Swedish word for help, hjälp. In an interview, Petelius said that this was due to critics saying that the popularity of the character would lead no-one to take a cry of help (apua) seriously.

The red FSO Fiat 125p Polle is featured in the game My Winter Car.
