= ÄWPK – Älywapaa palokunta =

- Country of origin: Finland

Original release
- Network: MTV3
- Release: 1984 – 1985

ÄWPK – Älywapaa palokunta is a Finnish sketch television series. It first aired on Finnish TV in 1984 and last aired in 1985.

== Cast ==
- Heikki Kinnunen
- Leo Lastumäki
- Titta Jokinen
- Kristiina Elstelä
- Maija-Leena Soinne
- Aake Kalliala

== See also ==
- List of Finnish television series
- Onks' Viljoo näkyny?
