= 69 (album) =

Studio album by A.R. Kane
- Released: 20 June 1988
- Recorded: 1988
- Studio: H.ark Studio
- Genre: Dream pop; post-rock; avant-rock; psychedelia
- Length: 40:26
- Label: Rough Trade
- Producer: A.R. Kane; Ray Shulman

A.R. Kane chronology
69 (1988)	i (1989)

69 is the debut album by British band A.R. Kane, released in 1988 on Rough Trade Records and produced by the band with additional co-production from Ray Shulman. Following the release of their acclaimed Lollita and Up Home! EPs, 69 developed the experimental "dream pop" style named and pioneered by the duo, blending elements of dub, psychedelia, noise, jazz, and pop.

69 reached number 1 on the UK Independent Albums Chart upon release, and received critical acclaim from the UK music press, garnering comparisons to the work of many disparate artists and being hailed as musically innovative at the time of its release. Writing for Melody Maker, critic Simon Reynolds described it as "the outstanding record of '88." Music historian Martin C. Strong described the album's sound as "hard to pigeonhole yet seminal nevertheless."

The album has been recognized as an influential precursor to genres such as shoegaze, post-rock and trip hop, with it influencing acts in the respective genres and being identified as having prototypical songs in said genres. In a retrospective review for AllMusic, music critic Ned Raggett called it "an unfairly long-lost classic." In 2007, The Guardian included it in their list of "1000 Albums to Hear Before You Die."

== Background and recording ==
In 1987, Ivo Watts-Russell, head of A.R. Kane's then-label 4AD, suggested the duo collaborate with their then-labelmates Colourbox to create a house song that could chart as a single. Under the name M/A/R/R/S, they released the single "Pump Up the Volume". Though the song was a huge success, reaching number 1 in the UK Singles Chart and becoming a significant milestone in the development of British acid house music, A.R. Kane did not get on well with Colourbox and ultimately left 4AD in search for a new label and to return to the dream pop musical style of their own music. Before releasing 69, their debut album, the band moved to Rough Trade Records and released the Up Home! EP in 1988, denoting a change in sound. When asked by The Quietus "what happened to the A. R. Kane sound from [1987 to 1988]" and if the band were recording 69 simultaneously with the EP, Rudy Tambala of the duo only replied: "Up Home! was special. Something happened. I can't explain." He later elaborated:

"We were very lucky, we used to sit in bars, and stare wide-eyed at each other and laugh like spliff-heads, just cry with laughter for ages, saying, 'What the fuck is happening', and we knew it was not our doing, it was just that, it was happening, and we enjoyed the trip, with no sense it had ever started or would ever end. We were in an altered state for a few years. Drug-free, I hasten to add. Well, mostly."

69 was recorded at the band's personal studio H.ark Studios, and was their first release recorded there. For the most part, A.R. Kane wrote, performed, arranged, engineered and produced the entire record alone. Nonetheless, there are instances of other collaborators; Ray Shulman provides co-production on "Crazy Blue", "Suicide Kiss" and "Baby Milk Snatcher" and bass guitar on "Crazy Blue" and "Spermwhale Trip Over", Billy McGee plays double bass on one song, whilst Russell Smith plays bass on another. The clarinet is also played by Stephen Benjamin on "The Sun Falls Into the Sea". Tambala's sister Maggie Tambala sings backing vocals on "Crazy Blue."

== Music ==
=== Style ===
"This is no muso affair; all the songs bar "Sulliday" work as exquisite pop. Instead of hooks, though, there are "slides and slips," swooning cadences signifying pangs or shifts between altered states. I would say that the record is deeply moving−certainly it provokes severe internal bleeding in this boy–except that what AR Kane are about is the immobility of rapture. For them, each spasm of the gaze is a step out of time. They are petrified by beauty."

— Simon Reynolds writing for Melody Maker, 1988.

An experimental dream pop album, 69 was eclectically influenced by several artists, including mid-1980s Cocteau Twins, electric-era Miles Davis, Can, and the "disregard for sonic structure" of dub music, whereby 69 "disappears into distant echoes that strikingly predict the succulent Seefeel." Many of these influences were arbitrarily added to the band's sound palette out of their personal interest, as Tambala had previously fabricated a profile for the band referencing these acts to a journalist in 1986. Music journalist Simon Reynolds described 69 as finding "unprecedented connections" between jazz, dub, acid rock, Sonic Youth-style "reinvention of the guitar" and Cocteau Twins circa Head Over Heels. Ned Raggett said 69 shows the band being "playful, mysterious, and inventive all at once, impossible to truly pin down", saying that the album was "never simply poppy nor completely arty, and definitely not just the Jesus and Mary Chain/Cocteau Twins fusion most claimed they were." The record is characterized by its usage of feedback, murmured, dizzy voices, "vapor-trail guitars," "echo-laden rhythms," submerged grooves, and its possession of "a very stripped down sound" with "tracks that at times straddle the line of music and noise."

Although the band coined the term "dream pop" to describe their music, Matteo Losi of Ondarock noted that the British music press had difficulties describing A.R. Kane and 69 in terms of genres, terming 69 as "proto-shoegaze / late wave", and the group's description in the press as the "black Jesus and Mary Chain" became reinforced to a point that annoyed Tambala and Ayuli. One reviewer also created his own genres to describe the album: "dream-dub," "narc-psych" and "trip-wave." Martin C. Strong, writing in The Great Rock Bible, said 69 was "avant-rock-styled" and "hard to pigeonhole yet seminal nevertheless." Besides the Cocteau Twins and the Jesus and Mary Chain, critics drew comparisons between parts of the album and Lee "Scratch" Perry's productions, Gong, early Pink Floyd, the "experimental end" of Jimi Hendrix, John Martyn, Arthur Russell, Public Image Ltd, the Durutti Column, Van Morrison's Astral Weeks, and Robert Wyatt's Rock Bottom. Reynolds contemporarily described the album as "an idyll midway" between Miles Davis' Bitches Brew and Cocteau Twins' aforementioned Head Over Heels.

Music Arcades, calling the album "pretty elliptical," noted that some of the tracks on 69 would not necessarily be considered songs, but "doodles in sound — but they also showed they could be very commercial when they wanted to be." According to Simon Reynolds, there are two "obsessions" that musically and lyrically govern 69; the ocean–"where normal laws of gravity, acoustics and breathing are eluded", and sleep–"the sleep of beauty, certainty, but above all, the waking sleep of innocence, where every moment is liberated from the grid of adult forward planning, experienced full because free of past and future anxiety. Where these obsessions converge is in the womb." He subsequently coined the term "oceanic rock" for the band's music, preempting their own description with the term "dream pop". In their 2011 book Beyond and Before: Progressive Rock Since the 1960s, music journalists Paul Hegarty and Martin Halliwell refer to the band being at the centre of Reynolds' idea of "oceanic music" and that the band reached new heights of rock experimentation on 69. Geiger said that "sea water is in many ways also the element that binds the whole plate together. The water is as a symbol of beauty, liberation and innocence. The concept is regressive in the sense that it seeks towards the pre-language, the pre-born - in the end fetal huddled perfection." Trouser Press said that the album is "mostly concerned with sensuality, but an enervated sensuality."

=== Composition ===
The album contains ten songs. According to Ned Raggett of AllMusic, opening song "Crazy Blue" resembles "little else recorded that year or any other one", and begins with a few plucked guitar notes and a sudden "jazzy scat-vamp" by Tambala "with his unique voice", followed by "a more direct poppish strum" and "a series of intense reverbed chime sounds and bongo-like percussion." According to Raggett, "from there on in, things take a turn for the strangely captivating in song after song." Both "Crazy Blue" and second song "Suicide Kiss" feature "lost and lonely listlessness" and languid jazz inflections.

"Baby Milk Snatcher" appears to reference both the then-UK Prime Minister Margaret Thatcher, who had become known as the "milk snatcher", and to oral sex, containing lyrics such as "baby suck my seed." "Sulliday", closing side A, features what Raggett described as "buried, measured percussion and evocative drones," while the following track "Dizzy" on side B features a "mesmerizing call-and-response by Rudi with himself, veering between more gentle, direct vocals and echoed shouts, eerily foretelling much of what Tricky would similarly do years later." The song features a sway of cello and vocals, counterpointed by a "catacomb of screams" described by Reynolds as combining John Lydon with Tim Buckley.

"Spermwhale Trip Over" was described by Ott as an "oddly titled masterpiece" and "the album's hallmark", saying that "the track's present-tense update of the Cocteau Twins' ethereal elegies is perhaps the group's defining moment." According to MusicArcades, the song "witters on about LSDreams." The song was a singular influence on Bark Psychosis and the aforementioned Seefeel. "The Sun Falls into the Sea" was described by Reynolds as "just incomparable: a mermaid lullaby not so much "accompanied" as almost drowned out by a sound like an immense quartz harp the size of a whale's exoskeleton, from which harmonics disperse and scatter as haywire as sunlight refracting beneath the ocean surface. It's not the notes played, but the untranscribeable opalescence of the stuff of this sound that's so unbearably lovely", with a melancholy waltz structure leading into the final track, the instrumental "Spanish Quay (3)".

== Release ==
69 was released on 1 July 1988 by Rough Trade Records on CD, LP and cassette in the United Kingdom, Europe, Australasia and the United States. The 1989 LP released in Australia and New Zealand also credits Festival Records as a record label. Commercially successful for an independent album, 69 peaked at number 1 on the UK Independent Albums Chart. Geoff Halpin is credited with packaging "design", with John Geary drawing the "69" illustration on the album cover and Paul Khera for the "sleeve." The alternative title Sixty Nine is also used in the packaging. In the UK, 69 was reissued on CD in 1999 by Rough Trade Records and in 2000 by One Little Indian, who also remastered and re-released the album in the US in 2004 alongside i (1989) as part of their "Crossing the Pond" series of remastered editions of British albums that were never released domestically in the United States. Pitchfork considered the remasters of the two albums to be "the jewels in the crown of One Little Indian's Crossing the Pond reissue campaign" alongside Disco Inferno's D. I. Go Pop (1994) and Technicolour (1996).

Simon Reynolds presumed the perceived references to oral sex in some of the band's lyrics continued to the album title, 69 (as in the sex position) and the "weird sea creatures in suggestive positions" on the album cover. Tambala denied any intention, saying the album cover shows "crustacean people from the planet Zarg... But they weren't having sex... They didn't have sex organs, for a start." Ayuli said "it's an angle. To be honest, most of the song titles we don't think about. The title seems to connect at the time, and it's not until later that we think: 'oh dear, we mentioned sperm again'. And then it's too late, it's printed on the record.... But I like the idea of people inputting stuff into the music. I mean, there's only so many things that can happen, right, and if you leave enough room, then they all happen." Geiger said that "the title's reference to the sexual position is obvious, but the figure symbolizes also opposed the connectedness, the circle organic ran from one to the other. The plate cover is emerging as also on white background a dark circle in the middle of which we can faintly make out the number 69, which is shaped like two dark, undulating spirals. Inner-case's intricate shading shows the blue background and more clearly six-figure as a pregnant woman and nine-figure as a man, both swimming, in harmonious movements."

== Critical reception ==
Professional ratings
Review scores
Source	Rating
AllMusic	4.5/5 stars
Encyclopedia of Popular Music	4/5 stars
The Great Rock Bible	8/10
Pitchfork	9.1/10
Spin Alternative Record Guide	9/10

69 was released to unanimously positive reviews, and led to the band becoming cited by many critics and fans as one of the most important and innovative bands of the era. Fact stated that the band became "considered every inch the equals of My Bloody Valentine and the Pixies." In his review for Melody Maker, Simon Reynolds was hugely favourable, saying "I'd like to think that it's a blueprint for the next decade of rock. Whatever, the album of this year is upon us, already." He said that numerous different aspects of the album reminded him of Van Morrison's Astral Weeks (1968)–"the child-woman fixations, the tongue-tied murmur, the scat-nonsense whose alliteration assonance skirt the edges of the "more can be said," the sense of the halcyon recovered of sky-gardens all wet with angel tears. Maybe, like Van Morrison's record, 69 is a maverick, singular, unrepeatable document." He later called it "the outstanding record of '88."

Later reviews were also highly positive. In the 1995 Spin Alternative Record Guide, Simon Reynolds said that 69 "was a druggy drift of swoony sensuality, narcotic reverie and polymorphous desire, Alex's frail vocal wandering through labyrinthine sound-grottoes." In his 2004 book The A to X of Alternative Music, Steve Taylor names 69 as "what to buy first"–recommending the album as what listeners new to the band should listen to first. Music Arcades was favourable in its review, with the reviewer saying "I don't like describing band just by comparing them to others — it feels lazy — but in this album you can hear clear echoes of Cocteau Twins, Lee Perry, Gong and early Pink Floyd as well as the experimental end of Hendrix." Rob Fitzpatrick of The Guardian commented that 69 was, "creatively, AR Kane's high-water mark," describing it as "a brilliantly sprawling and ambitious collection that was immersive and playful – and completely off the wall."

Upon its 2004 reissue, Chris Ott of Pitchfork wrote that the album revealed that "the unreal boom-box beat" of "Anitina" [the B-side to "Pump Up the Volume" that was billed as an A.R. Kane track] was "a red herring, aimed at selling the uninitiated on feedback and dizzy vocals." Although he considered the first two songs to sound like "awkward anachronisms" in 2004, he also said they were "the record's catchiest tracks" and considered "Spermwhale Trip Over" to be "perhaps the group's defining moment." In The Great Rock Bible, Martin C. Strong called the album "seminal," saying, "closer in many respects to PiL in bed with The Durutti Column", the duo's fantasy-league trips to the moon and back resulted in excellent ethereal pieces," namely "Crazy Blue", "Baby Milk Catcher", "Suicide Kiss" and "Sperm Whale Trip Over". The website of Primavera Sound said that A.R. Kane "were pioneers before their time but 69, their 1988 debut, is still seen today as splendid avant garde black pop with flashes of white, whichever way you look at it."

== Legacy ==
=== Influence ===
"Arguably the most criminally under-recognized band of their era, the British duo A.R. Kane anticipated virtually all of the key musical breakthroughs of the 1990s a decade before the fact, with the roots of everything from shoegazing to trip-hop to ambient dub -- even those of post-rock -- lying in their dreamy, oceanic sound."

— Jason Ankeny of AllMusic.

69, alongside the band's other albums for Rough Trade, made a deep impression on emerging shoegaze, psychedelic and post-rock bands such as Flying Saucer Attack, Slowdive, Bark Psychosis and Disco Inferno. According to Geiger, 69 is "both an important rock-historical document and a key liaison to the hybrid-like solutions of rock stereotypes that happened in the late 1980s and early 1990s. AR Kane's mixing of different musical genres show as a whole to these differing waves as shoegazer, ambient, trip hop and post-rock." The album has been said to "strikingly predict" the sound of 1990s band Seefeel, whilst "Spermwhale Trip Over" was a direct influence on Seefeel and Bark Psychosis. "Suicide Kiss" has been said to predict "heavier" shoegaze bands such as the God Machine. Tambala stated that highly regarded shoegaze band My Bloody Valentine's song "Slow", which he described as the birth of their signature "giddy, slip-sliding sound," was directly influenced by "Baby Milk Snatcher." He recalled My Bloody Valentine "were a jangly indie band until we put out 'Baby Milk Snatcher'. Suddenly they slowed it all down and layered it with feedback. And they did it better than us, which was interesting." "Dizzy" was observed by Allmusic for largely predicting the music of Tricky.

Tambala recalled reading that in 1988, David Bowie was spotted in Virgin Megastore buying 69 and noted that later that year Bowie recorded the raw Tin Machine, posing 69 as a possible influence on Tin Machine and quipping "Coincidence? I like to think not. Make of that little apocrypha what you will." In 2012, Rob Fitzpatrick of The Guardian remarked that A.R. Kane's blending of "dub, feedback, psychedelic dream-pop, house and free jazz" can still be heard in modern artists such as Radiohead, Four Tet, Animal Collective and Burial. As Ondarock described the scenario, "69 has been very influential, and like few other artifacts of its time. That said, it seems only right to reassess, under the purely aesthetic point of view, the fragrance bouquet: that unique mix where dub, pop, electronic, minimalism and rock instrumentation serene drown, eyeing the ascetic limbo of Talk Talk of Spirit of Eden and foreshadowing a thousand other things (not least 90% of the entire Too Pure catalog.)"

=== Aftermath and accolades ===
Due to the success of 69, the band had "more money to buy music" and were "exposed to a lot more through recommendation and just through hanging out in different scenes." This resulted in the band following 69 with the EP Love-Sick (1988) and the double album, i (1989), which was also met with critical acclaim. Ned Raggett of The Quietus said that "compared to the filigrees and fillips that began [on 69], i almost bursts out of the gate." The band recalled "we kinda broke into the candy store and went mental with Love Sick and i – somebody should have stopped us! The indie scene was new to us; I thought indie meant from Indianapolis. Our first bass player Russell introduced us to a lot of 'dark' music (Swans, Buttholes, Nick Cave) and our second bassist Colin introduced us to certain classical ideas and progressive, intellectual stuff." In 2012, Tambala "smilingly" recalled that "69 is a gem. We wanted to go as far out as we could, and in doing so we discovered the point where it stops being music."

At the end of 1988, numerous critics ranked the album on their lists of "Albums of the Year"; Melody Maker ranked it 5th, Spex ranked it 28th, Rockdelux ranked it 36th, whilst Q included it in their unordered list of the top 50 "Recordings of the Year." In 1999, The Guardian ranked the album at number 78 in its list of "Top 100 Albums that Don't Appear in All the Other Top 100 Albums of All Time Lists"–a list which featuring the greatest albums that do not appear in other lists of the greatest albums of all time, and in 2007, they included it in their list of "1000 Albums to Hear Before You Die." Ondarock included the album in its ongoing list of "Rock Milestones." In The Rough Guide to Rock, Ben Smith named it one of the best albums of the decade. Jim DeRogatis included the album in his 1996 list book Kaleidoscope Eyes: Psychedelic Rock from the '60s to the '90s.

== Track listing ==
All tracks are written by A.R. Kane.

No.	Title	Length
1.	"Crazy Blue"	3:26
2.	"Suicide Kiss"	3:36
3.	"Baby Milk Snatcher"	3:16
4.	"Scab"	3:25
5.	"Sulliday"	6:33
6.	"Dizzy"	3:47
7.	"Spermwhale Trip Over"	4:40
8.	"The Sun Falls into the Sea"	5:45
9.	"The Madonna Is with Child"	3:49
10.	"Spanish Quay (3)"	2:06

== Personnel ==
- A.R. Kane – writers, arrangers, engineers, producers
- Maggie Tambala – backing vocals (track 1)
- Russell Smith – bass (track 3)
- Billy McGee – double bass (track 6)
- Stephen Benjamin – clarinet (track 8)
- Ray Shulman – additional producer (tracks 1–3), bass (tracks 1 and 7)
- Paul Hera – sleeve design
- John Geary – 69 illustration
- Geoff Halpin – 69 design

== Charts ==
Chart (1988)	Peak position
UK Independent Albums Chart	1
