= Hamlet Goes Business =

1987 film

- Film poster
- Directed by: Aki Kaurismäki
- Written by: Aki Kaurismäki
- Based on: Hamlet by William Shakespeare (uncredited)
- Produced by: Aki Kaurismäki
- Starring: Pirkka-Pekka Petelius; Esko Salminen; Kati Outinen; Elina Salo
- Cinematography: Timo Salminen
- Edited by: Raija Talvio
- Production company: Villealfa Filmproductions
- Distributed by: Finnkino
- Release date: 21 August 1987
- Running time: 89 minutes
- Country: Finland
- Language: Finnish

Hamlet Goes Business (Finnish: Hamlet liikemaailmassa) is a 1987 Finnish comedy film directed by Aki Kaurismäki and starring Pirkka-Pekka Petelius. It is based on William Shakespeare's play Hamlet, but the events are housed in a modern Finnish wood processing family business.

== Plot ==
After the death of his father, Hamlet inherits a seat on the company board controlled by his uncle that decides to enter the rubber duck market. Hamlet is suspicious of the circumstances surrounding his father's death.

== Cast ==
- Pirkka-Pekka Petelius as Hamlet
- Esko Salminen as Klaus
- Kati Outinen as Ofelia
- Elina Salo as Gertrud
- Esko Nikkari as Polonius
- Kari Väänänen as Lauri Polonius
- Puntti Valtonen as Simo (as Hannu Valtonen)
- Mari Rantasila as Helena
- Turo Pajala as Rosencranz
- Aake Kalliala as Gyldenstern
- Pentti Auer as Hamlet's father (also as ghost)
- Matti Pellonpää as The guard
- Vesa Mäkelä as The doctor

== See also ==
- Hamlet on screen
