= Whycliffe =

English R&B singer

Donovan Whycliffe Bromwell, known mononymously as Whycliffe, is an English R&B singer from Nottingham.

Whycliffe was born into a Pentecostal family and sang in the choir as a child. After sending a demo tape to local label Submission Records, he attracted label attention, eventually signing with MCA Records. He released two albums for MCA and had three singles in the UK singles chart - "Lovespeakup" (1990) at No. 97, "Heaven" (1993) at No. 56, and "One More Time" (1994) at No. 72. He worked with the producers Tim Simenon, CJ Mackintosh, and Chris Porter. He dated Dannii Minogue in 1994. After being dropped from MCA, Whycliffe left the public eye, and in 2005, a Nottingham publication reported that he "sings for a quid in the city centre and lives in a sheltered housing complex." Around the same time, The Magic Heroes, a Nottingham band, wrote a song about him.

== Discography ==
- Rough Side (MCA, 1992)
- Journeys of the Mind (MCA, 1994)
