= Kristiina Elstelä =

Finnish actress

- Born: Anna Kristiina Elstelä; 10 January 1943; Helsinki, Finland
- Died: 26 June 2016 (aged 73)
- Occupation: Actress
- Years active: 1962–2016
- Spouse(s): Leo Werner Kalsto (? - 1966); Jotaarkka Pennanen (1979 - ?)
- Parent: Ossi & Irja Elstelä

Kristiina Elstelä (10 January 1943 – 26 June 2016) was a Finnish actress, who acted in many TV shows and movies. She also had a long career in theater and was a cabaret artist.

In 2006 Elstelä was one of the competitors in Dancing with the Stars television series. She and her partner Marko Keränen were ranked seconds, right after Tomi Metsäketo and Sanna Hirvaskari.

She was the daughter of actor Ossi Elstelä and actress Irja Elstelä.

== Filmography ==
=== Films ===
- Pekka & Pätkä ja tuplajättipotti (1985)
- Viimeinen keikka (1985)
- Pekka Puupää poliisina (1986)
- Onks' Viljoo näkyny? (1988)
- Pilkkuja ja pikkuhousuja (1992)
- Kummeli Kultakuume (1997)
- Kymmenen riivinrautaa (2002)
- Uuno Turhapuro – This Is My Life (2004)
- Ganes (2007)
- Sooloilua (2007)
- Myrsky (2008)

=== TV series ===
- ÄWPK - Älywapaa palokunta (1984–1985)
- Pekka ja Pätkä (1986)
- Takaisin kotiin (1995)
- Uuno Turhapuro (1996)
- Akkaa päälle: Team Ahma (1996)
- Kun taivas repeää (1997)
- Kaverille ei jätetä: Leiwoset (1999)
- Taivas sinivalkoinen (2001)
- Sydän kierroksella (2006)
- Tanssii tähtien kanssa (2006)

== Awards and nominations ==
- 1982 – Thalia Award
- 1998 – Pro Finlandia
- 2005 – Ida Aalberg Acting Prize
- 2007 – Jussi Award: Best Supporting Actress (Sooloilua)
