= New Clear Child =

Studio album by A.R. Kane
- Released: 13 September 1994
- Genre: Dream pop, pop-funk
- Length: 38:50
- Label: Luaka Bop
- Producer: A.R. Kane, Chris Cuben-Tatum

A.R. Kane chronology
i (1989)	New Clear Child (1994)

New Clear Child is the third and final studio album by A.R. Kane, released in September 1994 on Luaka Bop. It was recorded in London and San Francisco and produced with Chris Cuben-Tatum. The album's closing track, "Sea Like a Child", was released in June as the lead single.

== Recording ==
After the i album (1989), A.R. Kane's Rudy Tambala purchased a London studio and began producing for other artists, and Alex Ayuli moved to California to pursue other interests. A couple years later, according to Tambala, David Byrne’s Luaka Bop label reached out to the duo and asked if they would be interested in recording a new album. Tambala explained, "so we got together, but I think it wasn't a great experience for either of us in the end. I think we'd grown apart a little creatively, we'd had different experiences." Tambala noted that he and Ayuli wrote songs separately and then brought them into the studio, which contrasted with how the duo had previously worked and which led to friction between them.

== Reception ==
Simon Reynolds of Spin described the album's musical style as "jazz-tinged pop-funk" and criticized the album's "New Age nursery-rhyme lyrics". Allmusic's Ned Raggett complimented opening track "Deep Blue Breath" but said the album as a whole "simply doesn't cut the mustard compared to the stellar heights of the band's past work". Neil Kulkarni of The Quietus wrote: "You got the sense, listening, that Rudy and Alex were too apart, & consequently the recording process too bitty & piecemeal to make a coherent album." In a review of the album for Option magazine, Bill Meyer wrote that the "languidly crooned vocals, gently insinuating grooves, and smooth arrangements make 'New Clear Child' top drawer make-out music" and that the sparse production separates the album from typical "quiet storm fodder".

== Track listing ==
All tracks are written by A.R. Kane.

No.	Title	Length
1.	"Deep Blue Breath"	4:58
2.	"Grace"	3:25
3.	"Tiny Little Drop of Perfumed Time"	3:35
4.	"Surf Motel"	2:35
5.	"Gather"	4:30
6.	"Honey Be (For Stella)"	3:32
7.	"Cool as Moons"	3:44
8.	"Snow White's World"	4:52
9.	"Pearl"	4:36
10.	"Sea Like a Child"	3:10
