= Onks' Viljoo näkyny? =

1988 film by Hannu Seikkula

- Original Finnish film poster
- Directed by: Hannu Seikkula
- Written by: Pertsa Reponen (under alias Alan Dorkin)
- Produced by: Spede Pasanen
- Starring: Heikki Kinnunen; Pirkka-Pekka Petelius; Aake Kalliala; Kristiina Elstelä
- Edited by: Eero Jaakkola
- Music by: Jaakko Salo
- Release date: 4 November 1988
- Running time: 83 minutes
- Country: Finland
- Language: Finnish

Onks' Viljoo näkyny? (English translated "Has anyone seen Viljo?") is a 1988 Finnish comedy film directed by Hannu Seikkula. The film is based on Heikki Kinnunen's sketch from the ÄWPK – Älywapaa palokunta sketch show that was shown in 1984–1985. In addition to Kinnunen, the film stars Aake Kalliala and Pirkka-Pekka Petelius.

A total of 75,320 viewers watched the film in cinemas in 1988.

== Plot ==
The events begin with TV show presenter Uffa Hintman's (Heikki Kinnunen) announcement that he will pay ten million Finnish marks to whoever makes famous Taka-Surkee, the small village in the middle of nowhere. This information sets in motion Chamberlain Vähänen (Kinnunen), two Romani men Valtte (Aake Kalliala) and Arvid (Pirkka-Pekka Petelius), two Sámi men Naema-Aslak (Petelius) and Soikiapää (Kalliala), and, of course, several people from Taka-Surkee. Many also come up with the idea of robbing the prize money that Hintman keeps in his safe. The man with a cigarette and Koskenkorva bottle (Kinnunen), on the other hand, is content to just ask after Viljo from everyone who meets him.

== Cast ==
- Heikki Kinnunen as Uffa Hintman / Group manager Vähänen / Constable Unto Kutvonen / The man asking about Viljo / Urho
- Aake Kalliala as Lempo Römppäinen / Soikiapää / Arvid / Marko / Buffalo-Bill
- Pirkka-Pekka Petelius as Erkki Nyysteen / Mailman Uutela / Naema-Aslak / Valtte / Leo / Napoleon
- Titta Jokinen as Hulta Römppäinen
- Kristiina Elstelä as Mrs. Nyysteen
- Anna Hultin as Pamela Kutiainen
- Klaus Thomasson as Newscaster Kari Vaivanen
- Vesa Vierikko as Doctor
- Tauno Lahtinen as Tane, Police
- Aija Rikala as Announcer
