= C.J. Mackintosh =

British electronic music DJ and producer (born 1962)

- Born: Christopher John Mackintosh; 29 December 1962 (age 63); Paris, France
- Origin: London, U.K.
- Genres: House
- Years active: 1987–present

Christopher John Mackintosh (born 29 December 1962) is a British electronic music DJ and producer. Mackintosh was a member of M/A/R/R/S and a DJ at Ministry of Sound in the 1990s, in addition to doing production and remix work from the 1980s onward.

== Biography ==
Mackintosh was raised in London, where he DJed on a sound system he had put together with his brother, who was also a DJ. He held a regular gig at London's Flim Flam Club (run by Jonathan More of Coldcut) before being hired by Serious Records to put together compilation mixes, and in 1987 he participated in the DMC World Mixing Championships, winning the UK bracket. That same year he joined Dave Dorrell's Nasty Rox Inc. production crew, after the departure of Nellee Hooper, and then was invited by Ivo Watts-Russell to join a dance/hip-hop studio ensemble on the 4AD label, which became M/A/R/R/S. The group's hit, "Pump Up the Volume", was a hit both in the UK and the US.

Following M/A/R/R/S's short-lived success (the group released only one single), Mackintosh did remix and production work for C&C Music Factory, Coldcut, Tina Turner, Public Image Limited, Janet Jackson, Sly & Robbie, De La Soul, Whitney Houston, Barbara Tucker, and Whycliffe. He began DJing at Ministry of Sound in the early 1990s and concomitantly began releasing mix CDs; his residency at Ministry of Sound ended in 1996, but he continued releasing CDs into the 2010s.
