= A.R. Kane =

British musical duo

- Promotional image of A.R. Kane (1989)

Background information
- Origin: East London, England
- Genres: Dream pop; experimental rock; shoegaze; avant-pop
- Years active: 1986–1994, 2016–2018, 2023–present
- Labels: Rough Trade, 4AD, One Little Indian, Luaka Bop
- Spinoffs: Jübl
- Members: Rudy Tambala
- Past members: Alex Ayuli

A.R. Kane (sometimes AR Kane or A.R.Kane) is an English musical duo formed in 1986 by Alex Ayuli and Rudy Tambala. After releasing two early EPs to critical acclaim, the group topped the UK Independent Chart with their debut album 69 (1988). Their second album, i (1989), was also a top 10 hit. They were also part of the one-off collaboration MARRS, whose surprise dance hit "Pump Up the Volume" was released in 1987. Ayuli coined the term "dreampop" in the late 1980s to describe their eclectic sound, which blended elements such as effects-laden guitars, dub production, and drum machine backing.

The group broke up in 1994. Though their work fell into relative obscurity in subsequent years, they have been characterised by critics as among the most innovative and underrated groups of their era, and recognised as an influence on styles such as shoegaze, trip hop, and post-rock. In 2012, One Little Indian released Complete Singles Collection, which compiled the group's single and EP releases.

Tambala briefly reformed A.R. Kane from 2016 to 2018 with Maggie Tambala and guitarist Andy Taylor but without Ayuli. This reformation was later spun-off as its own band, Jübl, which has since released two singles and a studio album.

== History ==
=== Origins ===
Ayuli and Tambala first met as school children in an East London primary school. Ayuli is of Nigerian descent, while Tambala was born to a Malawian father and English mother. Both were involved in formative and culturally diverse music communities as adolescents, with Ayuli part of a dub soundsystem and Tambala part of a jazz-funk scene. In 1983, Ayuli became an advertising copywriter, one of few black creatives working in the London ad business. The two were both inspired by a mid-1980s Channel 4 performance by Cocteau Twins; Tambala explained: "They had no drummer. They used tapes and technology and Liz Fraser looked completely otherworldly with those big eyes. And the noise coming out of Robin [Guthrie]'s guitar! That was the 'Fuck! We could do that! We could express ourselves like that!' moment."

Attending a party in 1986, Tambala was asked how he and Ayuli knew each other; he lied that the two played together in a band, going on to describe their sound as "a bit Velvet Underground, a bit Cocteau Twins, a bit Miles Davis, a bit Joni Mitchell". A week later, the two were contacted by a label on the strength of Tambala's fabrication. The duo recorded their demo without a drummer, using a guitar and two cassette players.

=== 1986–1994: Recordings ===
In 1986, A.R. Kane released their debut single "When You're Sad" on One Little Indian. The duo were initially grouped with other "noise pop" acts, and were hailed in the press as "the black Jesus and Mary Chain", despite claiming to have never heard the work of that band. The next year the group signed to 4AD to release the follow-up 1987 EP Lollita, which was produced by Robin Guthrie of Cocteau Twins and saw the duo melding dub production, guitar feedback, free jazz and studio experimentation. While at 4AD, label chief Ivo Watts-Russell suggested that Ayuli and Tambala team with roster mates Colourbox, champion mixer Chris "C.J." Mackintosh, and London DJ Dave Dorrell to record a one-off single. Dubbing the collaboration M/A/R/R/S, the resulting single, "Pump Up the Volume" was a breakthrough effort heralding sampling's gradual absorption from hip-hop into dance music and ultimately the pop mainstream, reaching number 1 on the UK Singles Chart in September 1987.

A.R. Kane followed with their highly anticipated debut album, 69 (1988), which topped the independent charts and received rave critical reviews from the UK music press. Writing for Melody Maker, critic Simon Reynolds described 69 as "the outstanding record of '88." A.R Kane's next release was 1989's Love-Sick EP, followed later that year by their second studio album, i, in which they engaged more overtly with pop, dance and electronic styles. The duo, dismissive of the wildly disparate attempts by journalists to categorise their unique sound, eventually began referring to their music as "dreampop"; the term was widely adopted by music critics thereafter. Like its predecessor, i was released to moderate sales figures and topped the independent charts. Also in 1989, Rough Trade released the Pop EP.

In the early 1990s, the band went on hiatus. During this time, Ayuli and Tambala founded the label H.ark and released EPs by acts such as Papa Sprain and Butterfly Child. Rough Trade went bankrupt in 1991. In 1992, US label Luaka Bop released a 15-song US retrospective of the band's work, titled Americana. Greg Kot of The Chicago Times described the compilation as "a chronicle of sonic innovation in which the boundary between melody and noise, pop and the avant-garde, is blurred continually." The duo ended their hiatus thereafter to record a follow-up album, New Clear Child (1994), and then dissolved following its release.

=== 1994–2014: Post-breakup ===
Following the dissolution of A.R. Kane, Tambala made ambient- and dub-based music with his sister Maggie under the alias Sufi and released the 1995 album Life's Rising on Caroline Records. Tambala serves as head of new media for Ministry of Sound, and previously worked for Virgin Digital in non-musical roles. He has also recorded as MusicOne.

Ayuli was known to be a museum curator in the US. He put out releases under the name Alex!. In 2006, Ayuli contributed vocals to two tracks ("Soulsong" and "Passage") on the album Primario by the Static Discos artist Fax, and also appeared on Fax's album Zig Zag. Ayuli appeared in Beautiful Noise, a documentary on the shoegazing music scene of the 1990s

A.R. Kane's first two albums were reissued in the US by One Little Indian in 2004, and New Clear Child was reissued by 3rd Stone in 2000. Complete Singles Collection, a compilation of the group's EPs and singles, was released in 2012.

=== 2015-present: Reformation and spinoff as Jübl ===
In 2015, it was announced by Tambala that a quasi-reformation of A.R. Kane, bringing together new and old collaborators, would be taking place that year under the name #A.R.Kane and without the involvement of Ayuli.

In 2018, the revived band (featuring Rudi and Maggie Tambala plus guitarist Andy Taylor) renamed itself Jübl as part of a "forward-thinking rebrand". Rudi commented "I wanted to do something for the 30th anniversary (of 69), to give back to people some of the feeling they have shared with us, and to mark the moment. We discussed remasters, t-shirts, box-sets, re-recording some of the tracks, concerts, re-mixing the entire LP, and so on, but there were ownership and rights issues that became impenetrable barriers, so I just kinda gave up. Then one morning in May I just thought "Fuck it, it's a month away, just get the fuck out of bed and do something." Over coffee I realised that we could only move forward and be free from the nonsense by renaming the band, hence "Jübl". From that moment on everything just clicked into place. The three of us have been performing as A.R. Kane since 2016, and writing new songs too, so the material was there, we just had to make that final push."

Following the name change, Jübl issued two singles - "Thinking Sweet" (in June 2018) and "Quiet Sun Slips Over" (in June 2019), both of which would later appear on their first album under the new name, DNA Cowboys, released independently on 1 September 2019.

In 2023 A.R. Kane released a limited-edition vinyl boxset A.R. Kive containing remastered versions of the 69 and i LPs and the Up Home! EP (all originally released by Rough Trade from 1988–89) plus new remixes by artists including Slowdive. Coinciding with this release, Tambala played two live dates as A.R. Kane at The Social and Cafe Oto in London. The line-up for these shows included Maggie Tambala and Budgie on clarinet, credited by Tambala as the player on 'The Sun Falls Into The Sea'.

== Legacy and influence ==
Critic Jason Ankeny described A.R. Kane as "arguably the most criminally under-recognized band of their era" and an important progenitor of such musical developments as shoegazing, trip hop, ambient dub and post-rock. The Guardian has called their work "some of the 80s' most extraordinary music" and noted their influence on subsequent artists such as My Bloody Valentine. The group have been recognised for breaking stereotypes about the styles accessible to black musicians at a time when most popular black artists were relegated to soul, reggae and hip hop. Critic Simon Reynolds tentatively referred to A.R. Kane as "the great lost group of the 80s," while pointing out that the group in fact enjoyed fervent support in certain circles of the press and surrounding music scenes during the period. Reynolds later wrote that "A.R. Kane weren't a rock band in the conventional sense [...they] were more like an experimental guitar pop unit who loved to push the recording studio to its limits." Their work was characterised by frieze as "dreamy experimental pop." Pitchfork wrote that, "embracing dub, soul and paisley pop, A.R. Kane pushed boundaries most of their contemporaries completely ignored."

Bands such as Seefeel, Slowdive, Long Fin Killie, Dubstar, and the Veldt/Apollo Heights have cited A.R. Kane as an influence.

== Discography ==
=== Studio albums ===
- 69 (July 1988, Rough Trade; reissued 2004, One Little Indian)
- i (October 1989, Rough Trade; reissued 2004, One Little Indian)
- New Clear Child (September 1994, Luaka Bop; reissued 2000, 3rd Stone)

=== EPs ===
- Lollita 12-inch EP (July 1987, 4AD)
- Up Home! 12-inch EP (April 1988, Rough Trade)
- Love-Sick 12-inch/7" EP (October 1988, Rough Trade)
- rem"i"xes CD/12" EP (1990, Rough Trade Deutschland)
- A Love from Outer Space CD/12" EP (1992, Luaka Bop/Sire)

=== Singles ===
- "When You're Sad" 12-inch single (August 1986, One Little Indian)
- "Baby Milk Snatcher" 7-inch single (June 1988, Rough Trade)
- "Listen Up!" 12-inch single (October 1988, Rough Trade)
- "Pop" CD/12"/7" single (July 1989, Rough Trade)
- "Crack Up" 12-inch single (1990, Rough Trade France/Virgin)
- "Sea Like a Child" CD single (1994, 3rd Stone)

=== Compilation albums ===
- Americana CD/LP (1992, Luaka Bop/Sire)
- Complete Singles Collection 2CD (2012, One Little Indian)
- A.R. Kive 2xLP and 12-inch EP boxset (2023, Rocket Girl)
