= Drakarna över Helsingfors =

1996 novel by Kjell Westö

- Author: Kjell Westö
- Language: Swedish
- Published: 1996 (Söderström & Company) (Swedish)
- Publication place: Finland
- Pages: 448 (4th edition)
- ISBN: 978-9-515-21627-4
- OCLC: 62534226

Drakarna över Helsingfors (Kites over Helsinki) is a Swedish-language novel written by Finnish author Kjell Westö. The book tells about the life and faiths of the Bexar family, a Swedish-speaking Finnish family living in Helsinki (Helsingfors in Swedish), from the 1960s to the 1990s.

In 2001, the novel was made into a film of the same name starring Pirkka-Pekka Petelius.

== Other titles ==
- Leijat Helsingin yllä (Finnish translation)
