= Pirkka-Pekka Petelius =

Finland comedian

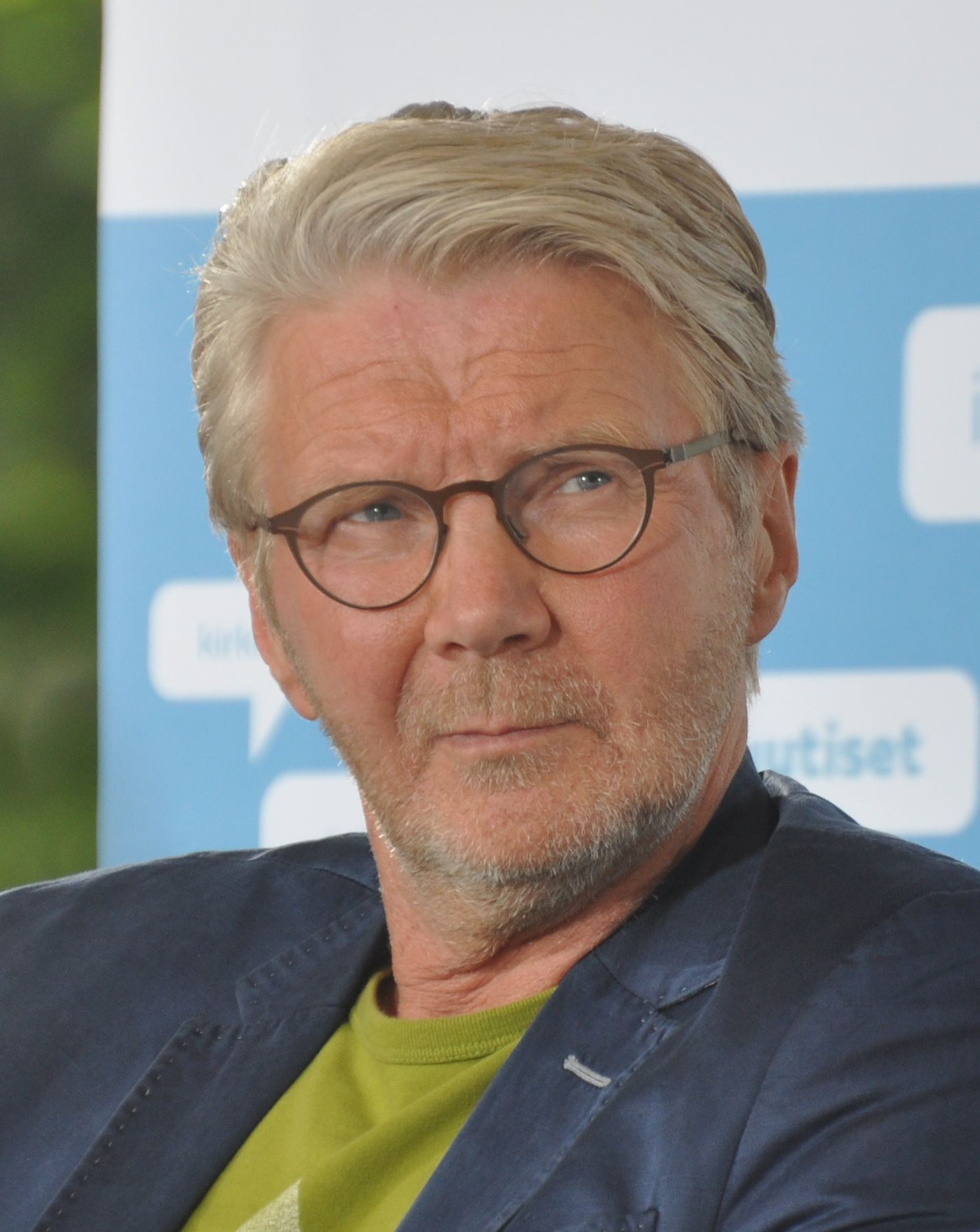
- Pirkka-Pekka Petelius at SuomiAreena public debate forum in Pori, 2015
- Born: 31 May 1953 (age 72); Alatornio, Lapland, Finland
- Occupation(s): Actor, director, producer, screenwriter, member of the Finnish Parliament
- Years active: 1975–present
- Spouse: Erika Skön (2019 – 2023)
- Awards: Special Venla; 1989; Special Telvis; 1997; HUIPS; 2004, for lifetime achievement in comedy

Pirkka-Pekka Petelius (born 31 May 1953) is a Finnish actor, director, producer, screenwriter and politician. He has also released six records as a singer. He is a member of the Green League and was elected to the Finnish parliament in the 2019 election with 6,331 personal votes, but is not a member of the parliament any more.

Petelius's breakthrough was in Yleisradio's sketch series Velipuolikuu (1983), which he wrote and also acted in. The popularity gained by the series started Petelius's career as one of the most well-known comedians in Finland. He gained immense popularity due to his work in the sketch series Pulttibois (and its sequel, Manitbois) with Aake Kalliala.

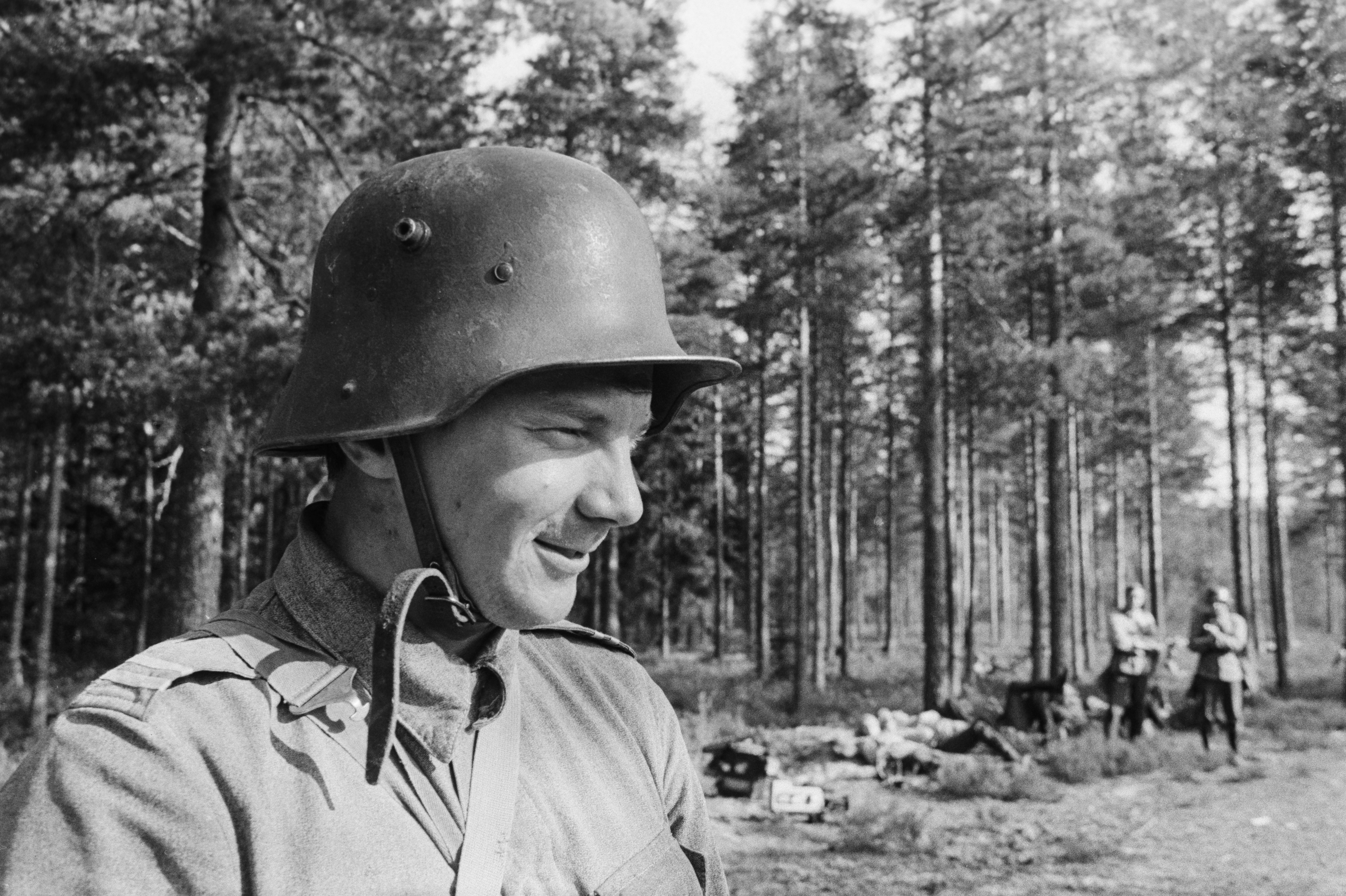
Petelius in 1984, during the principal cinematography of the film The Unknown Soldier in Niinisalo.

Despite being known as a comedian Petelius has also acted in several more serious roles in films and television, especially in the recent years. He played Hietanen in Rauni Mollberg's The Unknown Soldier (1985). Other significant films have been e.g. Aki Kaurismäki's Hamlet Goes Business (1986), Åke Lindman's Lapin kullan kimallus (1999) and Peter Lindholm's Drakarna över Helsingfors (2001).

He also provided the Finnish voice of Timon in Leijonakuningas (The Lion King) (1994).

== Filmography ==
=== TV series ===
- Velipuolikuu (1983–1984)
- Mutapainin ystävät (1984–1985)
- Tabu (1986–1987)
- Oudot Jutut
- Hymyhuulet (1987–1988)
- Neurovisio (1988–1989)
- Hui Helinää, Hei Hulinaa (1988–1989)
- Pulttibois (1989–1991)
- Manitbois (1992)
- Viihdeohjelma Tukholma (1993)
- Salli mun nauraa (1993)
- Hra 47 esittää (1994)
- Huijarinainen (1994)
- Akkaa päälle (1994–1996 and 2006)
- Hömppäveikot (1996)
- Ruonansuu & Petelius Co (1997)
- Nortia (1996)
- Team Ahma (1998)
- Kaverille ei jätetä (1999–2003)
- Korkeajännitystä (2001)
- Ou Nou! (2001)
- Handu pumpulla (2005)
- 6pack (2007)
- Tali-Ihantala 1944 (2007)
- Kymenlaakson laulu (2008)
- Pullukat (2009)
- Tellus (2014)
- Joulukalenteri: Porokuiskaajan arvoitus (2014)
- Luojan kiitos! (2015)
- Koomikot (2015)
- Downshiftaajat (2015)
- Conflict

=== Films ===
- Manillaköysi (1975)
- Hääyö myytävänä (1979)
- Pölhölä (1981)
- Kuningas, jolla ei ollut sydäntä (1982)
- Jon (1983)
- Calamari Union (1985)
- The Unknown Soldier (1985)
- Huomenna (1986)
- Linna (1986)
- V.Y. Vihdoinkin yhdessä (1986)
- Hamlet liikemaailmassa (1987)
- Onks' Viljoo näkyny? (1988)
- Rampe & Naukkis (1990)
- Uunon huikeat poikamiesvuodet maaseudulla (1990)
- Uuno Turhapuro – herra Helsingin herra (1991)
- Pilkkuja ja pikkuhousuja (1992)
- Anita (1994)
- Leijonakuningas (The Lion King, Finnish voice of Timon) (1994)
- Isältä pojalle (1996)
- Lahja (1997)
- Sokkotanssi (1999)
- Lapin kullan kimallus (1999)
- Klassikko (2001)
- Drakarna över Helsingfors (2001)
- Ranuan kummit (2003)
- Levottomat 3 (2004)
- Sellaista elämä on (2005)
- Prinsessa (2010)
- Hella W (2011)
- Härmä (2012)
- August Fools (2013)
- 8-pallo (2013)
- Ella ja kaverit 2 – Paterock (2013)
- Eila, Rampe ja Likka (2014)
- Luokkakokous (2015)
- Wildeye (Kätilö) (2015)
- The Unknown Soldier (2017)

== Discography ==
=== Radio ===
- Yömyöhä (1986–2005)
