= Accidental Lovers =

Television series

Accidental Lovers (Sydän kierroksella) is a Finnish interactive musical comedy series on television. Viewers can affect the love relationship between 61-year-old cabaret singer Juulia (Kristiina Elstelä) and 30-year-old pop star Roope (Lorenz Backman) by sending mobile text messages to the show.

Depending on the nature of the messages the plot takes turns in real time. Either Juulia or Roope falls in love or they both fall in love, resulting in a relationship that has three different kinds of endings. Scenes between these climactic drama outcomes are chosen and organized semi-randomly according to the character's emotional state. Each voiceover thought on top of the scenes is chosen according to the keywords in the mobile text messages.

A total of twelve 28-minute episodes were broadcast during four nights. Every story starts from the same beginning but unfolds differently each time.

== Text message effect ==
Based on keywords that are scanned from viewers' text messages other one of the main characters think a voiceover thought at the same time when the message appears on screen. Each message is also 'cold' or 'hot' causing the character's feelings to cool off or warm up. As this message information accumulates the plot changes it turns.

== Production ==
Accidental Lovers was broadcast between late December 2006 and early January 2007 on Finnish YLE channel 1. It is a co-production of Crucible Studio in University of Art and Design Helsinki and YLE drama department. The new broadcast technology and production tools were developed in as part of the FP6 project New Millennium New Media (NM2).

- Directed by Mika Lumi Tuomola
- Original idea and written by Leena Saarinen and Mika Lumi Tuomola
