= Lahja =

Lahja is a given name. Notable people with this name include:

- Lahja Hämäläinen, Finnish ice sledge speed racer
- Lahja Ishitile (born 1997), Namibian Paralympic athlete
- Lahja Lehtonen (1927–2016), Finnish missionary
