= Velipuolikuu =

Finnish television sketch show

Velipuolikuu (lit. half-brother moon or brother half-moon, a pun in the form of a doubly compounded word) was a Finnish sketch comedy show that aired from 1983 to 1984 on YLE. The series featured actors Pirkka-Pekka Petelius, Kari Heiskanen, Esko Hukkanen, Robin Relander, and Niko Saarela, among others.

One of the show's memorable parts became Petelius' rendition of "Muistan sua Elaine" (composed by Alvar Kosunen and written by Matti Jurva) which often played at the end of the show. The song became so popular that it was released the following year on an album by the same name.
