= I (A.R. Kane album) =

i

Studio album by A.R. Kane
- Released: October 1989
- Genre: Pop, rock, reggae, house
- Length: 67:49
- Label: One Little Indian
- Producer: A.R. Kane, Ray Shulman

A.R. Kane chronology
69 (1988)	i (1989)	New Clear Child (1994)

i (sometimes stylized as "i") is the second album by A.R. Kane, released in 1989 on One Little Indian. The album engaged more overtly with pop, dance and electronic styles following the group's debut Sixty Nine. Like its predecessor, it was released to moderate sales figures and topped the UK independent charts.

== Reviews ==
Professional ratings
Review scores
Source	Rating
AllMusic	4.5/5 stars
The Encyclopedia of Popular Music	3/5 stars
Pitchfork Media	7.7/10

In a mixed 1990 review for Artforum, critic Greg Tate stated that the album "seems both more rudimentary and more calculating by comparison with the organic and uncontrived otherness of 69," noting their incorporation of "various received rock, reggae, and house song-forms" and opining that "the results are spotty." In 2004, Chris Ott of Pitchfork called i "a stylistically incontinent album" fragmented by "unchecked ambition," noting a "drastic shift toward clearer production and pop choruses" but concluding that only the album's final quarter would be capable of "convincing anyone A.R. Kane's genius." The AllMusic review by Jason Ankeny stated that the album "now seems like a crystal ball prophesying virtually every major musical development of the 1990s" and concluded that, "largely overlooked upon its original release, i is still an underappreciated masterpiece."

== Track listing ==
All tracks are written by A.R. Kane, except where noted.

No.	Title	Writer(s)	Length
1.	"Hello"		0:27
2.	"A Love from Outer Space"		5:08
3.	"Crack Up"		4:12
4.	"Timewind"		0:15
5.	"What's All This Then?"		4:03
6.	"Snow Joke"		4:46
7.	"Off into Space"		0:04
8.	"And I Say"		2:42
9.	"Yeti"		0:11
10.	"Conundrum"		2:32
11.	"Honeysuckleswallow"		3:20
12.	"Long Body"		1:21
13.	"In a Circle"	A.R. Kane, Billy McGee	4:37
14.	"Fast Ka"		0:27
15.	"Miles Apart"		3:01
16.	"Pop"		3:40
17.	"Mars"		0:20
18.	"Spook"		3:10
19.	"Sugarwings"		3:37
20.	"Back Home"		0:07
21.	"Down"		5:14
22.	"Supervixens"		5:40
23.	"Insect Love"		2:52
24.	"Sorry"		0:05
25.	"Catch My Drift"		5:40
26.	"Challenge"		0:06

== Personnel ==
- A.R. Kane – arranger, audio production, engineer, guitar, multi instruments, producer, string arrangements, vocals
- Gini Ball, Sally Herbert, Jeremy Metcalfe – violin
- Benny Di Massa – drums
- Colin Cairns – bass
- Sue Dench, Jocelyn Pook – viola
- John Dent – cut, cutting engineer
- The False Harmonies – strings
- Lincoln Fong, Gerard Johnson, Paul Kendall, Nigel Kennedy, Gail Lambourne, Mick Roasty, Sam Smith, Ken Thomas, Jeff Ward – engineer
- Girl, Lorna – vocals
- Bonjo Iyabinghi Noah – percussion
- Art Kane – arranger, engineer, instrumentation, producer, string arrangements
- Maggie Tambala – bass, vocals
- Martin McCarrick, Audrey Riley – cello
- Billy McGee – string arrangements
- Ray Shulman – bass, producer
- Chris Tombling – balloon, violin
- Halpin Grey Vermeir – cover design, design
