= MARRS =

Recording collective

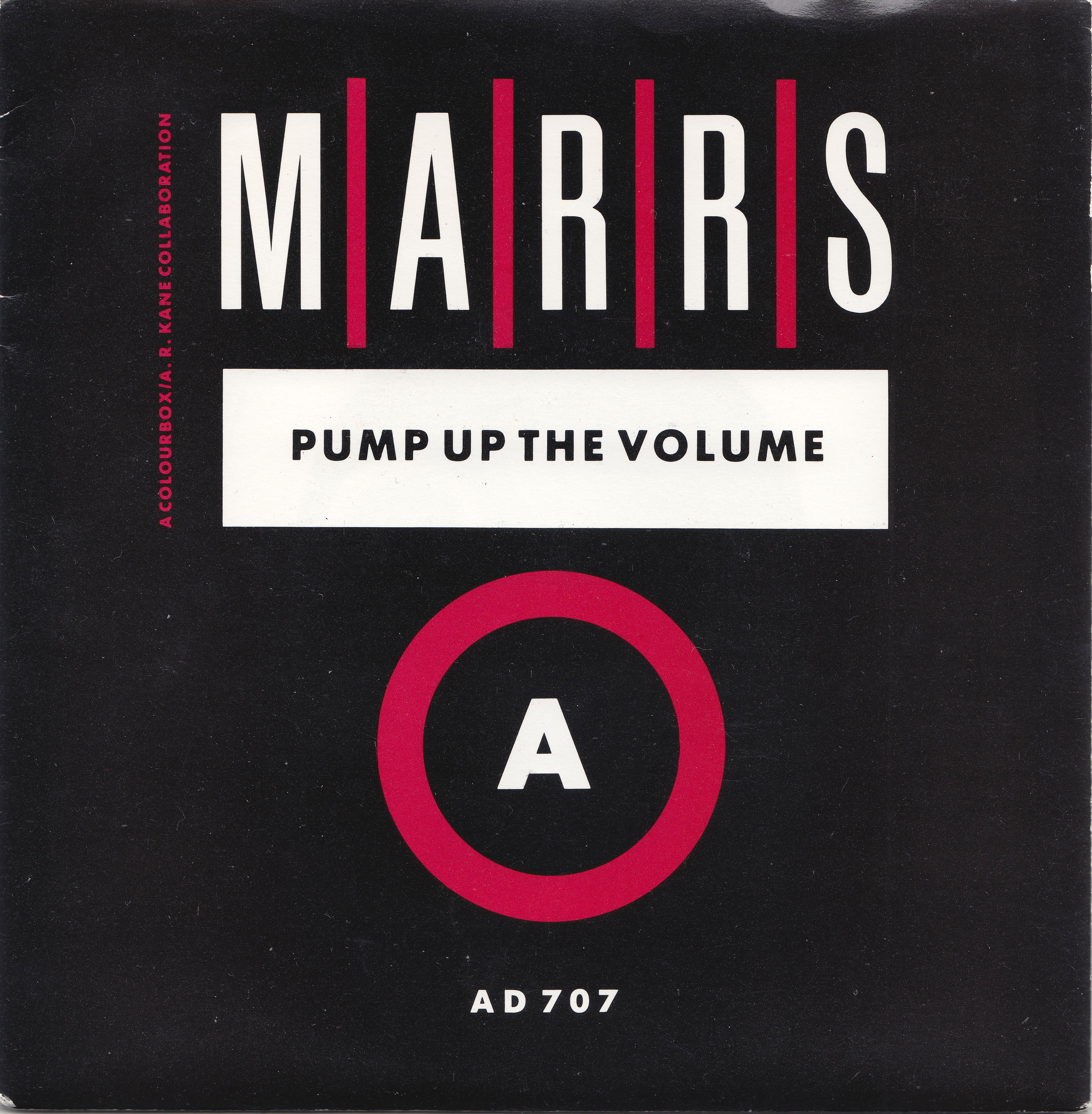
- Cover of their only single "Pump Up the Volume"

Background information
- Origin: London, England
- Genres: Dance; hip house
- Years active: 1987
- Labels: 4AD; 4th & B'way; Island; PolyGram
- Spinoff of: A.R. Kane; Colourbox
- Past members: Alex Ayuli; David Dorrell; C.J. Mackintosh; Rudy Tambala; Martyn Young; Steven Young; Russell Smith; John Fryer

MARRS (stylised M|A|R|R|S) were a 1987 recording collective formed by the groups A.R. Kane and Colourbox, which only released one commercial disc. It became "a one-hit wonder of rare influence" because of their international hit "Pump Up the Volume", which was their only single.

== History ==
MARRS started in 1987 as an intended collaboration between the groups A.R. Kane and Colourbox, with additional input from DJs Chris "C.J." Mackintosh and Dave Dorrell. However, instead of working together, the two groups ended up recording a track each, then turning it over to the other for additional input. Of the two pieces completed, one, "Anitina", was an A.R. Kane track with drum programming by Colourbox's Steve Young. The other, "Pump Up the Volume", was a propulsive Martyn Young track constructed largely of samples, including one of A.R. Kane's guitars. The title of the song was taken from a sample from “I Know You Got Soul” by hip-hop duo, Eric B. & Rakim.

The record was released under the alias MARRS, an acronym derived from the forenames of the five 4AD artists involved in the project: Martyn Young (from Colourbox), Alex Ayuli and Rudy Tambala (from A.R. Kane), Russell Smith (an associate A.R. Kane member and founder of Terminal Cheesecake), and Steven Young (from Colourbox).

The ostensibly double A-sided single "Pump Up the Volume" / "Anitina", released on 4AD in the UK, was to be the sole MARRS release. Only "Pump Up the Volume" gained significant attention and airplay and went on to be a No. 1 hit in the United Kingdom, Canada, the Netherlands, and New Zealand, as well as a top-ten hit in several other countries. ("Anitina" was listed on the UK chart after several weeks, but a note on the actual chart explained that "Anitina" was listed at the record company's request, "without significant evidence of consumer interest" in the track).

"Pump Up the Volume" was released on 4th & B'way/Island Records in the US. Because of legal issues, some of the samples used in the original UK release of the song were removed and replaced in the US release.

It was nominated for the 1989 Grammy Award for Best Pop Instrumental Performance, but lost out to "Close-Up" by David Sanborn. In September 1987, MARRS announced that it would not issue a follow-up release. Colourbox would never reform, while A.R. Kane would continue after a hiatus from 1994 to 2015.

Group member Steven Young died on 13 July 2016.

== Discography ==
- 1987: "Pump Up the Volume" / "Anitina (The First Time I See She Dance)" (4AD AD 707) No. 6 Aus, No. 1 NLD, No. 1 UK, No. 13 US, No. 1 US Dance Club Play
