= Aake Kalliala =

Finnish actor (born 1950)

Aarne "Aake" Kalliala (born 5 October 1950) is a Finnish actor. He was born in Heinola. Kalliala is best known for appearing on comedy-sketch shows such as Pulttibois (with Pirkka-Pekka Petelius).

== Partial filmography ==
- Pölhölä (1981)
- Koomikko (elokuva), (1983)
- Lentävät luupäät, (1984)
- Liian iso keikka (1986)
- Hamlet Goes Business, (Hamlet liikemaailmassa, 1987)
- Farewell, Mr. President, (1987)
- Onks' Viljoo näkyny?, (1988)
- Rampe & Naukkis – kaikkien aikojen superpari, (1990)
- Uunon huikeat poikamiesvuodet maaseudulla, (1990)
- Uuno Turhapuro – Suomen tasavallan herra presidentti, (1992)
- Kummeli Goldrush (Kummeli Kultakuume, 1997)
- On the Road to Emmaus (Emmauksen tiellä, 2001)
- Rumble, (2002)
- Trench Road (Juoksuhaudantie, (2004)
- Kummelin Jackpot, (2006)
- Man Exposed (Riisuttu mies, (2006)
- Three Wise Men (Kolme viisasta miestä, (2008)
- Rally On! (Ralliraita, (2009)
- Backwood Philosopher (Havukka-ahon ajattelija, (2009)
- Home Sweet Home (Kotirauha, (2011)
- The Path of the Righteous Men (Vares – Kaidan tien kulkijat, (2012)
- Road North (Tie pohjoiseen, (2012)
- The Hijack That Went South (Kaappari, (2012)
- Rendel, (2017)
- Reindeer Mafia (Poromafia, (2023)
