= List of LGBTQ characters in soap operas =

This is a list of soap opera characters who are lesbian, gay, bisexual, or transgender, and the live action television and radio soap operas which feature them. Characters who are pansexual, asexual, non-binary and intersex are also included. Character orientation and gender identity can be portrayed on-screen, described in the dialogue or mentioned. Characters are listed by soap opera, and soap operas by country of origin. The history of LGBT characters that feature in soap operas begins in Australia, with Don Finlayson, portrayed by Joe Hasham, who appeared in the Australian television soap opera Number 96 between 1972 and 1977.

== Argentina ==
=== Sos mi hombre ===
Sos mi hombre is an Argentine telenovela, which aired on El Trece between August 2012 and June 2013.

- Brenda Garay, portrayed by Gimena Accardi, is the wife of a male boxer who develops an attraction towards her personal trainer, Marisa. They begin a relationship and eventually marry.
- Marisa, portrayed by Luciana González Costa, is a personal trainer who begins a relationship with Brenda. They eventually marry.

=== Las Estrellas ===
Las Estrellas is an Argentine soap opera produced by Pol-Ka Producciones for El Trece between May 2017 and January 2018. Starring Celeste Cid, Marcela Kloosterboer, Natalie Pérez, Violeta Urtizberea, Justina Bustos, and co-starring, Esteban Lamothe, Gonzalo Valenzuela, Luciano Castro, Nicolás Riera, Nicolás Francella and Julieta Nair Calvo.

- Florencia Estrella, portrayed by Violeta Urtizberea, is one of the four Estrellas sisters and partial owner of the hotel Estrella. She and Jazmín become friends, later date, get married, and adopt two girls.
- Jazmín del Río, portrayed by Julieta Nair Calvo, is the hotel's sous-chef which Florencia partially owns. They later get married and adopt two girls.

== Australia ==
=== The Box ===
The Box is an Australian soap opera produced by Crawford Productions and broadcast by The 0-10 Network, which aired between February 1974 and October 1977.

- Lee Whiteman, portrayed by Paul Karo, appeared in the serial between 1974 and 1976. Lee is a high-camp television producer who is generally well liked and respected by the other characters. He had two same-sex relationships during his time in the series. Whiteman was popular with the show's viewers.
- Vicki Stafford, portrayed by Judy Nunn, is a sardonic bisexual television reporter. She became a popular cult figure among the show's fans. In the premiere episode of the series she engaged in the first lesbian kiss seen on a soap opera anywhere in the world.

=== Home and Away ===
Home and Away is an Australian television soap opera broadcast by Seven Network, which began airing in January 1988.

- Shannon Reed, portrayed by Isla Fisher, appeared in the serial between 1994 and 1997.
- Mandy Thomas, portrayed by Rachael Blake, appeared in the serial between 1995 and 1997.
- Toni Jarvis, portrayed by Bridie Carter, appeared in the serial briefly in 1995. Toni is the girlfriend of writer, Mandy Thomas.
- Peter Fraser, portrayed by Helmut Bakaitis, appeared in the serial between 1997 and 1999. Peter is married but is revealed to be in an extramarital affair with a family friend.
- Desiree Upton, portrayed by Simone Robertson, appeared in the serial in 2000. Desiree is a lesbian whom Gypsy Nash goes out with while exploring her sexuality.
- Stefan Hubert, portrayed by Damen Stephenson, appeared in the serial in 2000.
- Mel Davies, portrayed by Chris Scott, appeared in the serial in 2000.
- Christopher Fletcher , portrayed by Rian McLean, appeared in the serial in 2003. When Christopher returned to the serial, it is revealed he is gay. He tries to kiss a heterosexual Seb Miller, who rejects him but supports him, which leads to his departure.
- Sarah Lewis, portrayed by Luisa Hastings Edge, appeared in the serial in 2004. Sarah was in a relationship with a man, but in a flashback sequence it is revealed that she is also attracted to women.
- Eve Jacobsen, portrayed by Emily Perry, appeared in the serial between 2005 and 2006. Eve falls in love with a bisexual woman and dies trying to avenge the woman's death.
- Charlie McKinnon, portrayed by Matt Levett appeared in the serial in 2006. Charlie is a lonely teenager who becomes obsessed with Kim Hyde.
- Dean Silverman, portrayed by Gary Brun, appeared in the serial in 2006.
- Gareth Westwood, portrayed by Benjamin Ronczka, appeared in the serial in 2006.
- Freya Duric, portrayed by Sophie Hensser, appeared in the serial in 2009.
- Joey Collins, portrayed by Kate Bell, appeared in the serial in 2009.
- Charlie Buckton, portrayed by Esther Anderson, appeared in the serial between 2009 and 2013. Charlie is bisexual and had a relationship with Joey.
- Ty Anderson, portrayed by Darius Williams, appeared in the serial in 2018. Ty is a foster child who dates Raffy Morrison and later kisses a heterosexual Ryder Jackson, who rejects him but supports him which leads him to admit that he is gay.
- Alex Neilson, portrayed by Zoe Ventoura, appeared in the serial between 2019 and 2020. An emergency department doctor at the Northern Districts Hospital, Alex enters into a brief relationship with Willow Harris before leaving her when she receives a new job.
- Willow Harris, portrayed by Sarah Roberts, appeared in the serial between 2017 and 2021. Willow initially becomes confused about her feelings when she is kissed by Alex Neilson and later she enters into her first lesbian relationship.
- Allegra Freeman, portrayed by Laura McDonald, appeared in the serial in 2021.

=== Neighbours ===
Neighbours is an Australian television soap opera, originally broadcast by Seven Network. The network dropped the show and it was picked up by Network Ten, which later aired it on Eleven. The serial began airing in March 1985. The show went on a year-long hiatus from 28 July 2022, following a cancellation, but was revived a few months later commissioned by Amazon, with the show airing locally on 10.

- Andrew MacKenzie, portrayed by John Morris in 1994, was a minor character and is the serial's first homosexual character.
- Alf Taylor, portrayed by Frank Bren, appeared in 1994 as Colin Taylor's twin brother.
- Andrew Watson, portrayed by Chris Uhlmann, appeared as a recurring character between 1995 and 1996.
- Gino Esposito, portrayed by Claude Stevens in 2000 and Shane McNamara between 2001 and 2007 and later 2024 and 2025, is a hairdresser who is in a relationship with Aaron Barkley.
- Aaron Barkley, portrayed by Stewart Adam, appeared as a recurring character between 2003 and 2004. He is introduced as the boyfriend of Gino.
- Lana Crawford, portrayed by Bridget Neval between 2004 and 2005, with a guest appearance in 2020, is the soap's first lesbian character. She is initially closeted but later shares a kiss with Sky, which received criticism. Around 15 years later, they get married.
- Sky Mangel, portrayed by Miranda Fryer from 1989 to 1991 and Stephanie McIntosh from 2003 to 2007 (with guest appearances in 2015, 2020, 2022 and 2024), was the show's first regular character to have a same-sex kiss (with Lana), which was the subject of controversy with conservative groups. The couple later marry in 2020.
- Donna Freedman, portrayed by Margot Robbie, appeared between 2008 and 2011. She is openly bisexual and kisses a heterosexual female character, Sunny Lee, as well as male characters Kyle and Zeke. She later has a relationship with Ringo, who she later marries, and also a brief affair with Andrew.
- Stephanie Scully, portrayed by Carla Bonner, appeared in the series between 1999 and 2010, making guest appearances in 2013 and returning full-time in 2015 until 2018. Steph is portrayed as heterosexual until her 2015 return, where she reveals that she had previously been in a relationship with a woman, Belinda Bell. After coming out, Steph engages in relationships with men and women, including Mark Brennan and Victoria Lamb.
- Chris Pappas, portrayed by James Mason, appeared in the series between 2010 and 2015 (with a guest appearance in 2022). He is initially confused about his feelings for his best friend, before coming out as gay. He is the first on-going gay male character in the serial. He has had relationships with Aidan, Hudson and Nate.
- Aidan Foster, portrayed by Bobby Morley between 2011 and 2013, was an openly gay nurse introduced as a love interest for Chris.
- Scotty Boland, portrayed by Rhys Uhlich, was a recurring character between 2012 and 2013. He is a masculine man who is initially depicted a heterosexual and in a relationship with Georgia Brooks although he later makes advances towards Chris.
- Hudson Walsh, portrayed by Remy Hii, appeared in the series between 2013 and 2014. Hudson was introduced as a love interest for Chris.
- Ellen Crabb, portrayed by Louise Crawford, appeared as a recurring character between 2013 and 2017. She is the boss of Mark Brennan at the police station and was married to Victoria Lamb.
- Nate Kinski, portrayed by Meyne Wyatt, appeared between 2014 and 2016. Nate is depicted as an openly gay ex-military soldier with PTSD. During his time on the show, Nate has relationships with Chris and Aaron.
- Aaron Brennan, portrayed by Matt Wilson, joined the serial in 2015. Aaron is the openly gay brother of Mark and Tyler who has been in relationships with Nate, Tom and David. Aaron and David's wedding was the first same sex wedding to be broadcast on Australian television.
- Tom Quill, portrayed by Kane Felsinger, was a recurring character between 2016 and 2017. He was openly gay and has a relationship with Aaron.
- Victoria Lamb, portrayed by Claudia Greenstone, appeared as a recurring character between 2016 and 2017. Victoria is a medical consultant, the partner of Ellen Crabb and mother of their daughter Josie. Victoria is involved in Steph's surrogacy storyline and eventually develops feelings for her.
- David Tanaka, portrayed by Takaya Honda, has appeared since 2016. Although initially closeted, David comes out to his brother and enters into a relationship with Aaron. He and Aaron later marry in an episode that aired shortly after same-sex marriage was legalised in Australia, making David and Aaron the first same sex couple to legally marry on Australian television.
- Rory Zemiro, portrayed by Ash Williams, was a recurring character between 2017 and 2018. He was Aaron Brennan's ex-boyfriend, whom he met when they joined the Rough Trade dance troupe.
- Mick Allsop, portrayed by Joel Creasey, appeared as a recurring character between 2018 and 2022. Mick is a superfan of the dance troupe Rough Trade and was thought to have been Aaron Brennan's stalker, but Mick revealed that he liked Rory and was having sex with him while Rory was still dating Aaron.
- Rafael Humphreys, portrayed by Ryan Thomas, appeared in 2018 and briefly dated David.
- Chloe Brennan, portrayed by April Rose Pengilly, appeared in March 2018. Chloe is the younger sister of Mark, Aaron, and Tyler. Chloe is bisexual, shown mostly to have relationships with men but has dated at least one woman: Mel, is mentioned. She also falls in love with Mark's fiancée, Elly which causes complications in the buildup to their wedding. Later Chloe has flings with both men and woman, but eventually decides to give one more chance to Elly, who returns to Ramsay Street from Sydney for the show's finale and declares her love for Chloe, saying she's proudly queer and has always loved her.
- Elly Conway, portrayed by Jodi Anasta, is originally portrayed as heterosexual woman, who is dating Aaron Brennan's brother Mark. Their sister Chloe has a huge crush on her and they share what-is-thought-to-be a platonic kiss. Elly doesn't think much about the kiss but later finds out the truth. Before Elly and Mark wedding however, Elly ends up having sex with Chloe when Mark cancels (but later postpones) the wedding due to his personal issues. When this comes to Mark's knowledge just after their wedding ceremony, he has hard time understanding it. Elly later has a one-night stand with Shaun and becomes pregnant. When Mark finds out it's not his baby, he and Elly get divorced. Elly then has the baby and tries to get back together with Chloe. They go on dates but Elly being too nervous and scared about being other than straight, it gets them to get apart again and Elly leaves for Sydney. Before the show's finale however Elly comes back to Erinsborough and declares her love for Chloe, saying she's proudly queer and has always loved her. In the finale episode Chloe decides to give Elly one more chance and they get back together, sealing it with multiple kisses.
- Melissa Lohan, portrayed by Jacqui Purvis, appeared in 2019. Mel is Chloe's ex-girlfriend who arrives in Erinsborough when she is called by Chloe's brother Aaron, who believes she can distract Chloe from her feelings for Elly. Chloe and Mel re-ignite their old relationship but Mel is later dumped by Chloe arrested for purposefully trying to burn down a garage.
- Mackenzie Hargreaves, portrayed by Georgie Stone, is the soap opera's first transgender character.
- Nicolette Stone, portrayed by Charlotte Chimes between 2020 and 2022 and Hannah Monson since 2023, is the lesbian daughter of Jane Harris (Annie Jones). She has relations with Chloe, Asher, Asher and Amira.
- Curtis Perkins, portrayed by Nathan Borg has appeared since 2021 as a teacher at Erinsborough High.
- Jesse Porter, portrayed by Cameron Robbie, appeared in 2021.
- Asher Nesmith, portrayed by Kathleen Ebbs, is the serial's first non-binary character.
- Cara Varga-Murphy, portrayed by Sara West, has appeared since 2023. She moves to Ramsay Street with her wife Remi and their teenage sons.
- Remi Varga-Murphy, portrayed by Naomi Rukavina, has appeared since 2023. She is married to Cara and works as a doctor in Erinsborough Hospital.
- Amira Devkar, portrayed by Maria Thattil, appeared in 2024. She had a brief romance with Nicolette.
- Logan Shembri, played by Matthew Backer, has appeared since 2024.
- Parker Reed appeared briefly in 2024, portrayed by Gaz Dutlow.

=== Number 96 ===
Number 96 is an Australian television soap opera broadcast by The 0-10 Network, which aired between March 1972 and August 1977.

- Don Finlayson, portrayed by Joe Hasham, appeared in the serial between 1972 and 1977. He is the first openly gay character on Australian TV. Don is a dependable lawyer who enjoys several gay relationships over the course of the series, the most enduring being with live-in boyfriend Dudley. Don is the first regular gay character on TV anywhere in the world.
- Dudley Butterfield, portrayed by Chard Hayward, appeared in the serial between 1973 and 1977. Dudley is a camp and flighty caterer and fan of old films, who is later revealed to be bisexual.
- Robyn Ross, portrayed by Carlotta, appeared in the serial in 1973. Robyn is revealed to be a transgender woman, which leads to her departure. She is the first trans character played by a trans actress anywhere on TV in the world.
- Bruce Taylor, portrayed by Paul Weingott, is Don's first boyfriend and identifies as bisexual as he is also having an affair with Maggie Cameron.
- Rob Forsyth, portrayed by John McTernan, was Don's final boyfriend.
- Simon Carr, portrayed by John Orcsik, appears in the TV series to be straight, but in the film version of Number 96, he comes out as gay and has an affair with Don.
- Marie Crowther, a guest character portrayed by Hazel Phillips is caught spying on flatmate Vera Elaine Lee in the shower which could make her the first lesbian character ever seen on TV. Sadly, no footage of her exists today.

=== The Power, The Passion ===
The Power, The Passion is an Australian television daytime soap opera produced by the Seven Network in 1989.

- Steven, portrayed by Joe Spano, is gay and was killed-off after a few months.

=== Prisoner ===
Prisoner is an Australian television soap opera produced by Grundy's and broadcast by Network Ten, which aired between February 1979 and December 1986.

- Franky Doyle, portrayed by Carol Burns, appeared in the serial in 1979. The first lesbian character to appear in the serial.
- Doreen Anderson, appeared in the serial from 1979 to 1984. Doreen has mostly had relationships with men, but she has also had attractions to Franky Doyle and Lynn Warner.
- Angela Jeffries, portrayed by Jeanie Drynan, appeared in the serial in 1979.
- Sharon Gilmour, portrayed by Margot Knight, appeared in the serial in 1980.
- Judy Bryant, portrayed by Betty Bobbitt, appeared in the serial from 1980 to 1985. She is the older girlfriend of Sharon Gilmour, she was also sexually attracted to heterosexual prisoner Georgie Baxter and later fell in love with fellow inmate and friend Pixie Mason.
- Joan Ferguson, portrayed by Maggie Kirkpatrick, she appeared in the serial from 1982 to 1986. She is a corrupt prison officer who had a relationship with a female prisoner before being transferred to Wentworth Detention Centre. She tried to force herself on new prisoner Hannah Simpson and had even entered into a relationship with another officer, Terri Malone.
- Ray Proctor, portrayed by Alex Menglet, the camp prison cook, appeared in the serial from 1984 to 1985.
- Terri Malone, portrayed by Margot Knight, she appeared in the serial in 1985.

== Brazil ==
=== América ===
América is a Brazilian telenovela broadcast by Rede Globo between March 2005 and November 2005.

- Junior, portrayed by Bruno Gagliasso, is the son of a powerful ranch owner, struggling to accept his homosexuality and agonizing over how to tell his family and friends about it.
- Zeca, portrayed by Erom Cordeiro, is bisexual and develops romantic feelings for Junior.

=== Em Família ===
Em Família is a Brazilian primetime telenovela broadcast by Rede Globo, which aired between February 2014 and July 2014.

- Marina Meirelles, portrayed by Tainá Müller, is a photographer who forms an attraction to Clara, who later leaves her husband for Marina. They eventually marry.
- Clara Fernandes, portrayed by Giovanna Antonelli, is a married housewife who leaves her husband to form a relationship with Marina. They eventually marry.
- Vanessa, portrayed by Maria Eduarda, is the former girlfriend of Marina, whom she has unrequited feelings for. Vanessa later dates Flávia.
- Flávia Campos, portrayed by Luiza Moraes, is the assistant to Marina, who dates Vanessa.

=== Malhação: Viva a Diferença ===
Malhação a Brazilian soap opera broadcast by Rede Globo, which has aired since April 1995.

- Heloísa Gutierrez (Lica), portrayed by Manoela Aliperti, is initially portrayed as compulsory heterosexual. She has many relationships with men, but falls in love for women. She later comes out as lesbian (in original spin-off series As Five).
- Samantha Lambertini portrayed by Giovanna Grigio, is a bisexual who has a close friendship with Lica, which develops into a relationship after they admit their feelings.
- Gabriel Romano, portrayed by Luis Galves, is gay.
- Guto, portrayed by Bruno Gadiol, was originally portrayed as heterosexual confused until, he later comes out as gay in original spin-off series As Five.

Terra e Paixão

Terra e Paixão, a Brazilian soap opera broadcast by Rede Globo, which was broadcast between May 2023 and January 2024.

- Ramiro Neves, portrayed by Amaury Lorenzo, is a gay man who has always suffered from compulsory heterosexuality, until his destiny crosses with Kelvin and they become inseparable. Between provocations and a strong complicity, he fell in love with his best friend and the two gave themselves over to passion. He killed the main villain of the plot to defend his boyfriend. After that, the lovers get married in prison in the last chapter.
- Kelvin Santana (Kevinho), portrayed by Diego Martins, is a gay man who had to adapt to a solitary life in a small town, without a family (who does not accept him as he is). From a former male escort and waiter, he became one of the main characters in the story, helping Ramiro accept a better version of himself, helping him with his studies and opening his heart to love.
- Menah dos Santos, portrayed by Camilla Damião, is a lesbian woman and a dedicated teacher. Shy, she befriends Mara, who's in a toxic relationship with a man, and decides to help her break free from it. The two eventually fall in love and must battle Menah's brother's brief prejudice. She proposes to Mara in the final stretch of the story.
- Angelina, portrayed by Inês Viana, is a woman in love with her former boss, Agatha La Selva, one of the main villains of the plot.
- Luana Shine, portrayed by Valéria Barcellos, is a trans woman who has the big dream of inheriting her boss Cândida's bar, and that remains revolted when she is boycotted by Kelvin, who feared being fired after she became his boss.
- Mara Ramalho, portrayed by Renata Gaspar, is a sapphic woman who falls madly in love with her only friend and confidant, her best friend Menah. She is going through a difficult time in her life, trapped in a toxic relationship with a man who takes her money. Previously, dated Nina, with who she had conflicts during part of the plot.
- Nina, portrayed by Kizi Vaz, is a sapphic woman who begins the soap opera falling in love with Jonatas and during the plot reveals that she still has feelings for her ex-girlfriend, Mara.

== Canada ==
=== Paradise Falls ===
Paradise Falls is a Canadian soap opera broadcast by Showcase, which began airing in June 2001 and ceased airing in September 2008.

- Nick Braga, portrayed by Cameron Graham, is the closeted homosexual grandson of the local mayor. He was engaged to a woman before coming out.
- Trish Simpkin, portrayed by Michelle Latimer, is a bisexual goth teen.

== Finland ==
=== Kotikatu ===
Kotikatu (Home street) was a Finnish semi soap opera/drama series and broadcast by Yle TV1. It aired from 1995 to 2012.

- Laura Mäkimaa (formerly Söder) , portrayed by Pirjo Moilanen, had relationships with different men, having two children, son, Jarkko Mäkimaa (Elias Salonen) with Jake Byman (Juha Veijonen) and daughter, Kerttu Söder (Linda Liikka) with Kimmo Söder (Jarkko Sarjanen). Laura was married to Kimmo until his death from AIDS. Laura started dating Krisse Karri in 2009. Couple later entered into a registered partnership but broke up after a long-term relationship.
- Krisse Karri, portrayed by Piitu Uski, dated Laura Mäkimaa and entered into a registered partnership but they broke up after a long-term relationship.

=== Rantabaari ===
Rantabaari (Beach bar) is a Finnish daily soap opera broadcast by MTV Sub, which has aired since September 2019. The titular beach bar (later pizzeria) called Trissa is located at Taivallahti in Helsinki. The series takes place in the same universe as Salatut elämät.

- Milo Vinberg, portrayed by Eric Barco, is a gay man who moves to Helsinki from Vaasa after breaking up with his boyfriend, Lauri. Milo starts studies at the University of Helsinki and begins a secret relationship with his married professor.
  - Lauri is Milo Vinberg's unseen ex-boyfriend, whom Milo broke up with before entering the show. Milo's sister (Sofia Arasola) never liked Lauri and Milo revealed that Lauri cheated on him.
- Olivia Pouru, portrayed by Sara Ritala, is a DJ who checks out different men and women on Tinder. Olivia starts messaging with two women "Rosa" and "Kaarina". Relationship with "Kaarina" seems to go well first but then she seemingly disappears so Olivia decides to focus on "Rosa". Later Olivia finds out that "Rosa" is really her ex-boyfriend Timi (Jose Viitala) who rapes her after revealing he is "Rosa". Later, Olivia and "Kaarina" fall in love.
- Sauli Jokelainen, portrayed by Heikki Slåen, is a university professor who cheats on his wife (Emilia Jansson) with his student Milo Vinberg, who also happens to be his wife's best friend. Sauli and his wife later divorce off-screen for unknown reason, but it's been implied that Sauli's unfaithfulness was a factor and that he might have cheated on her more.
- Pinja Kaarina Koski, portrayed by Maria Loikala, is one of Olivia Pouru's Tinder matches (using her middle name on her profile). They fall in love.
- Salem Khaled, portrayed by Rami Farooq is a foreign asylum seeker (likely due his sexual orientation but it's been implied that his home country has a war or another dangerous situation going). Salem falls in love with Milo Vinberg and tells him that he has a wife whom he was forced to marry to hide the fact that he is gay. His asylum application (asylum was applied due Salem's homosexuality) is rejected due him having a wife.
- Konsta Syrjä, portrayed by Kaarlo Viheriävaara was a gay teenager who had relationship with Milo Vinberg 10 years prior to third season (aired at 2021). He committed suicide because of their break-up which leads his sister (Mira Rastas) to murder Milo's sister and try murder Milo.
- Luukas Eerola, portrayed by Tatu Arminen, is bisexual chef who likes having threesomes with his girlfriend, Jessi Heino (Anna Tavaila) and different men. Luukas and Jessi both develop feelings towards one of their flings, Jaakko Järviaho and they start polyamoric relationship. The Trio moves to Panama but Luukas later breaks up with both Jessi and Jaakko and returns to Finland as well as his old job at Trissa. He falls for his best friend, Janne Haukkala's fiancé, Lara Berger (Anni Grönberg) and the two start a relationship after Janne (Hemmo Karja) breaks up with Lara (due her cheating on him with Luukas). Luukas later confesses to Lara that he misses men and ends up having sex with his co-worker, Ilari Koski at Trissa's kitchen. At first Luukas says it didn't mean anything but later kisses Ilari. Hoping to start a relationship with both Lara and Ilari, Luukas confesses that he has a crush on Ilari but Lara breaks up with Luukas. However Lara decides the trio could try polyamory but Lara and Ilari later agree that polyamory is not for them and break up with Luukas. Wanting to try a relationship with one person, Luukas asks both of them to be his partner but gets rejected and returns to his childhood hometown, Kristinestad.
- Jaakko Järviaho, portrayed by Joonas B. Snellman, is one of Luukas Eerola and Jessi Heino's one-time stands who becomes infatuated with them. The trio enter into relationship and move to Panama together. Luukas later breaks up off-screen with both Jessi and Jaakko but it's unknown if Jaakko and Jessi are still together.
- Ilari Koski, portrayed by Nikolas Ilola, is a romantically jaded chef, who hates everything related to love. He has a crush on Luukas Eerola but has trouble admitting it to himself or to others. Ilari even encourages Luukas and the woman Luukas loves to get together and has a one-night stand with another man. Despite this Ilari keeps harboring feelings towards Luukas and they end up having sex at their workplace's kitchen. Luukas tells afterwards that it was meaningless which breaks Ilari's heart. Luukas later kisses Ilari and confesses that he has crush on him too. Ilari and Luukas' girlfriend, Lara agree to share Luukas. However Lara and Ilari later agree that polyamory is not for them. After Luukas tells Ilari he's the love of Luukas' life (like he did to Lara) and asks Ilari to be his boyfriend, Ilari doesn't believe him and rejects him.
- Santtu, portrayed by Aarre Lehtimäki, is a customer at the pizzeria Trissa, where Ilari Koski works at. Santtu starts flirting with Ilari and they have a one-night stand. They agree to go on a date next day. Santtu and Ilari later agree to go to Linnanmäki together but Ilari fades on him. This makes Ilari assume that Santtu doesn't want to see him anymore.

=== Salatut elämät ===
Salatut elämät (Secret Lives) is a Finnish daily soap opera broadcast by MTV3, which has aired since January 1999. It takes place primally at a fictional street named Pihlajakatu, located in Helsinki.

- Kalle Juhani Laitela, portrayed by Pete Lattu, is originally a closeted (now openly) homosexual, who struggles to seek acceptance. In 2001 Kalle and his then partner, Kuisma Savolainen, shared the first ever same-sex kiss seen in Finnish television. Before coming out, Kalle had a teenage relationship with a girl named Kristiina (Mia Penttilä), for whom he did not really have feelings for. However, much to his surprise, Kalle had a brief but genuine relationship with his female co-worker, Katariina Mäkelä (Jasmin Hamid) in 2013.
- Harri Järvi, portrayed by Mikko Leskelä, is a gay gym worker who helped Kalle Laitela with accepting Kalle's homosexuality and coming out.
- Valtteri Elovirta, portrayed first by Matti Ristinen (2000) and then Rami Rusinen (2012, 2013) was Kalle Laitela's boyfriend who only wanted sex. Years later they met again and Valtteri raped Kalle. Valtteri has also raped multiple another victims, including Kalle's female friend, Jenni Vainio (Anu Palevaara). While Valtteri is in the hospital (due being beaten by one of his would-be-victims) Kalle and his father (who had come to avenge his son's rape but instead found Valtteri unconscious and called for help) find DVDs Valtteri had filmed of his assaults. After Valtteri gains his consciousness Kalle tells him the DVDs have been given to police by "an alert citizen" and Valtteri gets arrested.
- Outi, portrayed by Hanna Koistinen, was a lesbian representative wife of Valtteri Elovirta who (with her female partner) only wanted to have a baby with Valtteri. She later helped Kalle Laitela to get together with Valtteri.
- Niko Bergman, portrayed by Tero Autero, was a photographer who dated Kalle Laitela for a while until he realized that Kalle was in love with his straight best friend Saku Salin (Jasper Pääkkönen). Niko also told Saku about the matter, which caused a dispute between Kalle and Saku.
- Repe Suorsa, portrayed by Jan Fyhr, was an acquaintance of Kalle Laitela who paid Kalle money for the nights they spent together.
- Sakari Taalasmaa was an unseen member of Taalasmaa family. Sakari was homosexual, but advanced in the army to become a company commander. Later, he died in the Eastern Karelian offensive in 1944 during the Continuation War. Seppo Taalasmaa (Jarmo Koski) told Sakari's story to Kalle Laitela.
- Kuisma Savolainen, portrayed by Antero Vartia, was a partner of Kalle Laitela whom he met at the army when Kalle was completing his military service. They were unofficially wed by a shaman in Lapland (because same sex marriage wasn't legally possible in Finland until 2017) and moved to Brazil together. They later break up due Kalle cheating on Kuisma and Kalle returns to Finland.
- Henrik Lammi, portrayed by Petri Rajala, was Maarit Salin's (Jaana Saarinen) employer in the editorial office of Olivia magazine. Jukka Salin (Jouko Keskinen) thought that Maarit was cheating on him with Henrik, but Henrik turned out to be gay.
- Heli Sievinen, portrayed by Sannamaija Pekkarinen, is dating her boyfriend Sauli Kiviranta (Eero Tommila) but is unable to have sex with him not knowing why. After kissing her female teacher Teresa Ala-Uotila, she realizes that she prefers girls and they start dating. After many failed relationships Heli meets Kiia Hyvönen with whom she moves to Vaasa and gets engaged but later breaks up. When Heli returns to Helsinki for her father's wedding she ends up having a fling with her new step sister Iida Mustonen.
- Teresa Ala-Uotila, portrayed by Sanna-June Hyde, is a lesbian high school teacher who develops feelings for her student, Heli Sievinen. After seeing them kissing, Heli's ex-boyfriend, Sauli Kiviranta tells the principal about Teresa's "inappropriated relationship with a student" and she resigns. Teresa and Heli soon become a couple but later Teresa breaks up with Heli to be with her ex-girlfriend Kirsi Petäjä.
- Kirsi Petäjä, portrayed by Minna Rimpilä, is a girlfriend of Teresa Ala-Uotila whom she breaks up with and moves to London off-screen. She and Teresa later get back together.
- Sami Pajola, portrayed by Tommi Saarinen, was Heli Sievinen's school friend. Sami was gay, though Heli and her sister, Annika (Emmi Parviainen) first thought he had a crush on Heli.
- Taru Saaristo, portrayed by Minna Turunen is a lesbian university teacher who develops feelings for her student Heli. At first they can't get along and argue about everything. When Taru admits that Heli has some good points regarding her subject and they start dating. They move to Paris together but break up off-screen when Heli falls in love with Iiris Kaukovaara.
- Tiina Mäki, portrayed by Hanna Lekander, studied at the same university where Taru Saaristo was working as a teacher. Taru was dating Tiina for a while until she left her for Heli Sievinen. Tiina tells Heli about her past with Taru and claims that Taru is a player who dates all her female students. Heli kissed Tiina in front of Taru but later confesses to Taru that it was fake.
- Leo Sievinen, portrayed by Jarmo Mäkinen is a man who's living in Nurmes with his male partner, Hannu Saari until his death in 2009. Before coming out Leo was married to a woman (outside the show) whom he had children with. Leo being gay caused his son, Joonatan's classmates to bully him.
- Hannu Saari, portrayed by Teemu Ojanne was the domestic partner of Leo Sievinen until Leo's death.
- Iiris Kaukovaara, portrayed by Mira Kivilä is a woman who for some reason left her family and disappeared outside the series. She was declared dead by her family but really she lived in Paris at that time. Her first appearance on the show was when she came back from France. Iiris is thought to be a straight mum of three but it is later revealed that while she lived in Paris she had a relationship with Heli Sievinen, who by coincidence lives in the same staircase in Helsinki. They meet each other in the hallway for the first time after Iiris left Heli in Paris to come back to Helsinki. Their old feelings for each other surface and they end up kissing and also having sex few times even though Iiris is going to remarry her ex-husband Panu (Aarni Kivinen). After Heli and Iiris' relationship is accidentally revealed to everyone (including Panu), they decide to get back together. Now Iiris is being truthful to herself and others. She has said that she's a lesbian which causes Panu to get angry and they start fighting aggressivily. Heli and Iiris later break up and Iiris moves back to Paris. In 2018 Iiris' daughter, Aino (Jasmin Voutilainen) revealed that Iiris was living in Belgium and getting married. Panu seems to still be bitter of Iiris being lesbian.
- Peter Grynqvist, portrayed by Jouko Uusipato, is a gay gallerist. He becomes interested in Kari Taalasmaa (Tommi Taurula) after mistaking him for gay but later admits his mistake.
- Eveliina Lehmussaari, portrayed by Heidi Lindén, is Heli Sievinen's old classmate and basketball buddy. They had a date at the grand opening of the inn called Amanda where they participated a basketball game. After everyone heard Heli and Iiris Kaukovaara's conversation on the speakers due them not knowing microphone being in same room and turned on, Eveliina did not want to have anything to do with Heli.
- Sonya Fadiga, portrayed by Sue Willberg, is a Senegalese closeted lesbian (because of her super religious parents) co-worker of Heli Sievinen at Routaketo Oy, who starts to date Heli in secret. Their relationship is revealed to Heli's parents who promise not to tell about Sonya's sexuality to Heli's boss. Sonya breaks up with Heli who is having a baby with artificial insemination because she's not ready to be mom.
- Kiia Hyvönen, portrayed by Outi Condit is a taxi driver and single mother of her daughter, Anniina. She meets Heli Sievinen who is recovering from abortion due ectopic pregnancy. They go on a date and later move to Vaasa together. In 2012 Heli revealed that they have got engaged. In 2026 Heli revealed that they have broken up.
- Aarni Räsänen, portrayed by Mikko Kauppila (2011, 2012), was a dancing boy whom Iida Mustonen arranged for a date first with Onni "Tale" Taalasmaa (Emil Hallberg), whom she thought was gay (Tale had a crush on Iida), and with Elias Vikstedt following year. However, Elias was so in love with Lari Väänänen that he couldn't pay attention to Aarni.
- Elias Vikstedt, portrayed by Petteri Paavola, was gay and in a relationship with Lari Väänänen and later with Miska Koistinen. Elias also had a crush on his straight neighbor, Joonatan Sievinen. (Markku Pulli) after mistaking him for gay. He and Lari get back together but Elias is killed when Lari's mentally ill cousin, Marianna Kurki (Oona Kare) drives over him.
- Ville Kurtti, portrayed by Tony Honkanen, studied at the same high school as Elias Vikstedt, Tale Taalasmaa, Iida Mustonen and Lari Väänänen. Elias asked Ville on a date and the couple went to the movies. Lari and Iida, who was his girlfriend, ended up on the same show and the date was ruined. However, at the end of the date, Ville kissed Elias and later asked him to go on a new date via text message. Elias sees Ville kissing another boy at Cafe Moose's masquerade, and the couple's budding relationship ended.
- Lari Väänänen, portrayed by Ronny Roslöf, is a closeted homosexual who after coming out, is evicted by his father (Ari-Matti Hedman). Lari has had relationships with Iida Mustonen (before coming out), Elias Vikstedt and Kalle Laitela whom he almost married. Lari also impregnated his female friend, Sanni Pohjonen (Kerttu Rissanen) whom he had a drunken one-night stand with.
- Miska Koistinen, portrayed by Juska Reiman is Elias' boyfriend and fiancé. They break up when Elias cheats him with Lari.
- Jutta Korhonen (formerly Juha Korhonen), portrayed by Maarit Poussa, is a transgender woman and father of Iida Mustonen. After her surgery, she left Iida and Iida's mother Maria (Salli Suvalo). When learning that Iida was searching for her father, Jutta lied to Iida saying that Juha is dead but later tells the truth (Jutta also hinted that when she was still Juha she was with Maria only "because it is normal"). Iida calls Jutta by her first name instead of mom or dad though Jutta has referred to herself as Iida's another mother. Jutta has also acted as a mother figure to at least Mira Angervuo and Olli Oksa.
- Eva Tamminen, portrayed by Tiia Elg, is a bi-/pansexual mother of two daughters, who's had a fling/sexual relationship going on with her best friend Monica Mustavaara. Eva says that she falls in love with a person, not man or woman. All of her other relationships have been with men. Eva and Monica have a shared ex who is the father of Eva's older daughter, Nella (Sonja Kasurinen/Emma Nopanen).
- Monica Mustavaara, portrayed by Irina Vartia, is a lawyer who's had a fling/sexual relationship going on with her best friend Eva Tamminen, though Monica wants to identify as straight and says "it was just an experiment". All of her other relationships have been with men. Eva and Monica have a shared ex who is the father of Monica's son, Magnus.
- Jesse, portrayed by Mikko Laine, met drunken Kalle Laitela in DTM and they had a one-night stand. Jesse later met Elias Vikstedt and told him that he had spent the night with "a doctor whose boyfriend was much younger". Elias realized that Kalle had cheated on Lari Väänänen and told Lari about it.
- Sami Kosonen, portrayed by Rauli Ylitalo, was a criminal constance who fell in love with Kalle Laitela. Kalle cheats on him with a cleaner of the hospital he works at and learns that he might have infected Sami with chlamydia. To hide this Kalle gives him antibiotics claiming they are "iron supplements he should take due blood loss" (Sami got stabbed by a criminal some time earlier). Kalle finds out that Sami hasn't taken his antibiotics and tells him about potential infection when Sami is proposing to Kalle on his birthday. Sami gets mad and they break up. When they are broken up Kalle harbors feelings towards both Sami and his other ex-boyfriend, Lari Väänänen. Kalle chooses Sami and they get back together but Sami is murdered by Kalle's overly jealous fling, Tero Puustinen when they have moved in together and Kalle is planning to propose to him.
- Tero Puustinen, portrayed by Leo Kirjonen, is working as a cleaner at the hospital where Kalle Laitela works as a chief medical officer. They have a fling and Tero tells afterwards that he has chlamydia. He says that he got it from Kalle (because 2 months earlier his tests were clean) and recommends Kalle to get it treated and tell his boyfriend, Sami Kosonen about it. Tero becomes obsessively infatuated with Kalle and he starts sending him dirty messages and making sexual comments which leads Kalle to fire him. After seeing Kalle together with Sami (it's been hinted that Tero also stalked Kalle) and learning that they have moved in together, Tero becomes morbidly jealous and murders Sami by stabbing him to the stomach. Police finds Tero's finger prints from the knife he used and he confesses. Police is taking Tero to prison when he sees Kalle and tells him that he is in love with him.
- Viola Angervuo (formerly Helenius), portrayed first by Annalisa Tyrväinen (2015–2016) and then Vivi Wahlström (2016–2024), dated at least two different boys but felt something was missing from the relationships. She later came out as a lesbian after having a crush on her female high school classmate named Mira Jokinen. They fall deeply in love and later get married taking Viola's grandmother's maiden name to their surname. Mira gave birth to their son, Ilo (means "joy" in Finnish) in the police car on her way back to prison (They were both sentenced for 2 years for a manslaughter and a grave desecration after Viola accidentally killed a man threatening Mira and with their best friends buried the body to a forest) after being hospitalized due hypothermia after fellow prisoner locked her into the freezer room. When Viola gets on parole Mira tells Viola to take Ilo because she fears for his safety. Prison guard, Ulpu Ritala (Katy Suutari) sends Viola a picture of Mira sleeping next to another prisoner which leads Viola to file for divorce. They agree to have a joint custody of Ilo and remain friends. However, after Mira gets released from prison, Mira & Viola end up having sex on Viola's sofa which leads Mira to hope they would get back together but Viola wants to stay friends. After Viola rejects Mira, Mira falls in psychosis and ends up in a mental institution, leaving Viola alone with Ilo. Some time later Viola receives a post card from Mira, who's hoping she and Ilo would move to Bali with her. Viola chooses to move because she wants a new start with Mira.
- Mira Angervuo (born Heikkinen, raised as Jokinen), portrayed by Olga Heikkala, is Viola Helenius' former high school classmate and bully; they fall deeply in love and later get married. Mira delivers their son, Ilo (Hugo Laakso) in the police car on her way back to prison (They were both sentenced for 2 years for a manslaughter and a grave desecration after Viola accidentally killed a man threatening Mira and they with their best friend buried the body in a forest) after being hospitalized due hypothermia after fellow prisoner, Ansku locked her into the freezer room. Mira fears for Ilo's safety in prison (because of Ansku) so she tells Viola to take him home since Viola is on parole. After Ansku tells Mira about giving away her daughter Mira forgives Ansku for her actions and they end up having sex. Prison guard, Ulpu Ritala sends Viola a picture of Mira and Ansku sleeping next to each another which leads Viola to file for divorce. They agree to remain friends. However, Mira & Viola end up having sex on Viola's sofa which leads Mira to hope they would get back together. Viola rejecting her (among the quilt from bullying her) and learning that she was conceived via rape leads Mira fall into psychosis and ending up in a mental institution. After recovering Mira sends Viola a card from Bali hoping she and Ilo would move there too because she still loves her. Viola calls Mira off-screen and tells her that they are coming.
- Iida Mustonen, portrayed by first by Rosa Rusanen (2011–2016) and then Pinja Kanon (2016–2020, 2026-), is a psychiatrist who revealed to Viola Angervuo (then Helenius) that she is bisexual after they kissed to make Viola's crush Mira jealous. Viola had a crush on Iida for a while. When Iida returns to Helsinki for her MTF father's (look Jutta Korhonen above) wedding she ends-up having a fling with her new step sister Heli Sievinen.
- Lauri Rossi (formerly Luokkanen), portrayed by Mikko Virtanen, is a dentist who meets Kalle Laitela in the hospital they both worked at. They fall in love and start dating (Kalle even considered to take Lauri's name if they marry) but break up after Kalle finds out that Lauri has been stalking one of Kalle's friends, Sabrina Mustavaara (Ilona Chevakova).
- Juho, portrayed by Lauri Kortelainen, was Kalle Laitela's date, whom Kalle's father, Ismo (Esko Kovero) secretly matched with him on Tinder. After this was revealed to Kalle, he tricked Ismo by claiming that he would move to Bulgaria with Juho.
- Sampo Kaukovaara, portrayed by Sampsa Tuomala, was originally a teenager who dated Anu Määttä (Elina Vehkaoja) but secretly had a crush on his stepsister, Peppi Puolakka (Sara Säkkinen). Sampo and Peppi later started dating, until she learned about his schemes to end her previous relationship with Konsta Nurmi (Emil Söderström).Sampo grows up to become a conman, posing as Kalle Laitela's friend to con him, but unexpectedly develops a crush on him. Sampo starts dating his female roommate, Cindy Rintala (Mia Ehrnrooth), but can't forget his feelings towards Kalle. He is afraid to come out as bi to his father, Panu due Panu's reaction to learning that Sampo's mother (look Iiris Kaukovaara above) is a lesbian. When Cindy goes to California for work, Sampo and Kalle get closer but Panu (who knows about him and Cindy) sees them having sex at their buildings sauna and is mortified by it. He leaves Helsinki to go his home in Lahti -without even talking with his son. Kalle's dad, Ismo and Ismo's best friend, Lasse Sievinen (who is also Iiris' ex-girlfriend, Heli's dad) travel to Lahti to persuade Panu to come back in Helsinki. He does and realizes that he overreacted (because the situation reminded him of Iiris' betrayal) and apologizes to Sampo when realizing his son really likes Kalle. Panu tells Sampo he loves him no matter what and gives his blessing to the relationship. Later, it turns out that despite their mutual attraction, Kalle doesn't want to date Sampo because Sampo hasn't broken up with Cindy and is still feeling too nervous and anxious about being bi, having always thought he was completely straight and never having had a crush on another man before. Lasse (Timo Jurkka) advises Sampo to try move on and he ends up meeting and sleeping with a guy named Alex. Both Cindy and Kalle see them when they are at Sampo's home making out. This leads Cindy to break up with him, Kalle becoming heartbroken and Alex getting mad at him. Alex later forgives him. Sampo later confesses his love to newly engaged Kalle who doesn't tell him about his engagement but Sampo hears about it from Kalle's fiancé, Petri Simola. After Petri breaks up with Kalle, Sampo and Kalle go on a date and Kalle even cooks dinner for them. Sampo later asks Ismo for Kalle's hand in marriage. When he proposes, Kalle (who has had bad experiences with bad things happening to his fiancés) apologizes and runs away which leads Sampo to break up with Kalle. Thanks to a plot of Ismo and Panu, they get back together and agree to proceed slowly. However, short time later Kalle proposes to Sampo at middle of a mall. Sampo pranks him by running away first (leading Kalle to chase him around the mall) but says "yes". Ismo hears Sampo talking about his con (among other controversial things he has done) with his sister, Aino (Tiia Weckström) and becomes suspicious about him but allows him to marry Kalle. Ismo accidentally blurts out about Sampo's con to Kalle leading Kalle to kick Sampo out of their home and file for divorce. Later Sampo has a short relationship with a man named Atte Karvinen but learns that Atte is married. After Atte, Sampo swears of men and starts dating Marianna Kurki which makes Kalle (now engaged to Petri and close friend with Sampo) jealous. Kalle even asks Sampo "if he has become straight again". Marianna soon breaks up with Sampo (coincidentally same time, Kalle breaks up with Petri). Sampo ends up comforting heartbroken Kalle and starts hoping they would get back together. Sampo doesn't seem to pine for Kalle anymore. Later Sampo runs into (unknowingly) Kalle's crush Tatu Väre whom he goes to coffee date with. Unbeknownst to them, Kalle sees them. They later end up spending the night together at the inn Sampo owns and calls home. Even though Kalle fully supports Tatu's relationship with Sampo, he struggles with intense heartache and experiences relapse. Kalle asks Sampo's help with his drinking, so he takes Kalle in his room where they find naked Tatu from his bed. Drunken Kalle suggests threesome, which both Sampo and Tatu consent. However Kalle and Tatu focus on each other, leaving Sampo feel left out. Afterwards, Tatu asks Sampo how he felt, so Sampo accuses him of ignoring him. After Sampo gets caught of blackmailing his business partner's husband, Tatu breaks up with him. Sampo later sees Tatu kissing Kalle and accuses Tatu of treating him as a consolation prize. However, Sampo wishes that three of them could remain friends.
- Petri Simola, portrayed by Esko Eerikäinen, is an alcoholic guard who was in the same rehab centre as Kalle Laitela after drunk driving (which made him realise that he has a drinking problem). They become friends and later end up having sex in the rehab but are seen by Kalle's crush, Sampo Kaukovaara. They meet some time later when Petri has got out of the rehab. He is at the hospital taking Mira Angervuo back to prison after she gave birth to her and her wife, Viola's baby, Ilo. After Mira hits Petri on the head with a metal rubbish bin and escapes he gets treated by Kalle. Kalle and Petri later agree to go on a lunch date but are (once again) seen by Sampo whom Kalle is still pining for. Kalle later confirmed that he and Petri are dating. Jealous Sampo tries to break them up by claiming that Petri had hit him (in reality Sampo asked his roommate, Joonatan Sievinen to hit him). Petri later proposes to Kalle, who says "yes". After Petri comes to their engagement party drunk, Kalle's father Ismo (who seems to have preferred Sampo over Petri during whole Petri and Kalle's relationship) tells him that Petri can see Kalle "only over his dead body". Kalle decides to give Petri another chance, but when Petri is hospitalized due drinking related accident, he tells Kalle that he thinks they should break up and re-enters to rehab because he fears that he might cause Kalle to start drinking again. After getting out from rehab Petri runs into Kalle who (now engaged to Sampo) is celebrating his stag party. Petri reveals that he still loves Kalle. Petri and Kalle later get back together and get engaged but Petri gets a guarding job at the Embassy of Finland in Colombia (it's possible that he was lying about it) and moves to Bogotá. When Petri returns to Finland claiming that the ambassador is visiting Helsinki (it's unknown if this is even true) Petri and Kalle start planning for their wedding but after learning that in Colombia Petri had started selling cocaine (tough it's been hinted that he helped prisoners to get drugs before that) Kalle breaks up with Petri. Therefore, Petri escapes the police abroad alone. Petri later returns and hides at his sister (and Ismo's new girlfriend) Iisa Havu's (Minna Koskela) apartment. He confesses to Iisa that he returned partily because he missed Kalle so much. Petri invates Kalle to a hotel anonymously, much to his shock. Petri tries to convince Kalle that he has changed. However being wanted by the police, Petri can not stay in Finland so he asks Kalle to leave to Colombia with him. Kalle tells him that "he has a new man and that he swapped a criminal to police". While Petri fears that Kalle does not want him anymore, Kalle is hinted that he might still have feelings for Petri. Petri tries to convince Kalle to move with him by claiming that "Kalle could continue his job as a doctor" while "he has always dreamed to become gardener". Kalle is suspecious that Petri would grow drugs, but Petri tries to explain that he "meant he would grow for example tomatos". Kalle tells afterwards to his neighbour Linda Eerikäinen (who's also a police) about his convorsation with Petri and calls him his "great love".Believing that Iisa is cheating on Ismo after seeing Petri's shadow in her window, Kalle sneaks in to her apartment and is knocked unconscious by Petri. Unaware of Petri's involvement (due Iisa taking the blame), Kalle decides to leave with Petri. However, Petri has decided that he should stay away from Kalle to protect him and rejects him. When Petri decides that it's time to leave, he asks Iisa to look after Kalle.
- Alex, portrayed by Tino Virta, is a man who stays at the inn Sampo Kaukovaara works at. They have a one-time stand in Alex's room and later go out for a beer together. They end up making out at Sampo's home but are seen by both Sampo's girlfriend, Cindy and Sampo's crush, Kalle. Alex gets mad at Sampo because he thought Sampo was already out of closet to everyone. He later forgives Sampo for not telling him the truth. They start hanging out more but Sampo is still pining for Kalle (which Alex seems to have noticed). They are likely not hanging out together anymore.
- Anna-Liisa "Ansku" Lahti, portrayed by Tiia Louhevaara, is a prisoner who is serving her sentence in same prison as Mira & Viola Angervuo. She locks pregnant Mira to a freezer room because she envies Mira's pregnancy due Ansku (for unknown reason but likely against her will) giving away her daughter. After Viola gets on parole and Mira starts missing her and their son, Ilo (whom Mira gave to Viola to protect him from Ansku) Ansku comforts her by giving her Fazer Blue chocolate and peer support. They end up having sex in Mira's prison cell. Ansku asks a prison guard, Ulpu Ritala to take picture of her and Mira sleeping in spoon position with the goal of breaking Mira and Viola up. After learning that Mira is eligible for parole Ansku asks Ritala to put drugs to Mira's bag so they would not be separated. When Mira goes to the court Ansku tells the truth and Mira gets parole while Ritala is imprisoned. Mira tells Ansku that she never wants to see her again.
- Atte Karvinen, portrayed by Arvo Jean-Michael Ärlig, is a man who stays at the inn Sampo Kaukovaara works at. Seeing how heartbroken Sampo is due his divorce and noticing Atte checking on him, Sampo's boss Salla Taalasmaa (Hanna Kinnunen) orders Sampo (who's off-duty) to take the wine Atte ordered to his room. Atte and Sampo end up having sex. When Atte has signed out Sampo goes to clean Atte's room and finds a note; Atte has left him his phone number. Sampo and Atte start texting and go on a date. The Date is interrupted by Sampo's ex-husband, Kalle Laitela and Atte leaves. Later while in the hospital to have a mole removed Atte runs into Kalle who convinces him to give Sampo another chance. Kalle later finds out that Atte has a husband and children in Lahti. Sampo invites Atte to have lunch with his father, Panu, who brings his co-worker, Arttu with him. Arttu is revealed to be Atte's husband and after the lunch Atte tells Sampo that he and Arttu are getting a divorce.
- Arttu Karvinen, portrayed by Antti Honka, is husband of Atte Karvinen, whom Atte cheats on with Sampo Kaukovaara. Arttu finds out about his husband's infidelity when Sampo's father, who is Arttu's co-worker, invites him to have lunch with Sampo and Atte. After the lunch Atte tells Sampo that he and Arttu are getting a divorce.
- Magnus Mustavaara, portrayed as a baby by Ukko Sirén (2017–2020) and as a teen/adult by Leevi Rapeli (2024-), is a son of Monica Mustavaara and Jiri Viitamäki (Mikko Parikka). When his grandmother, Dahlia Mustavaara (Inkeri Mertanen) asks Magnus if he has a girlfriend, he answers that he does not have a girlfriend or a boyfriend. Being closer with their grandson than Dahlia, Magnus' grandfather, Gunnar (Raimo Grönberg), explains to Dahlia that "Magnus doesn't want to restrict who he loves". He develops a crush on his male friend, Matias Kajander, and Matias' cousin, Daniela Axelsson (Lenita Susi), notices it. After Daniela confronts him about his feelings for her cousin, Magnus starts worrying that Matias will also notice them, so he talks about his crush with his father. When Jiri asks if the crush is a boy or girl, Magnus dodges the question by saying that "labeling into genders is typical millennial" and the crush is "one of his friends whom Jiri doesn't know" (Jiri knows Matias who is their neighbor). When Jiri starts talking about whether Magnus should just tell his friend how he feels, Magnus says he has "thought through all possible risks and scenarios". He tells Jiri "there's about 3% chance of his crush liking him back" and "he doesn't even know if the crush is bi". Jiri points out that "3% is a lot more than 0" but advices Magnus to think carefully if he wants to tell because in the worst-case scenario he could lose his friend, and says that "world is full of people and Magnus could get anyone he ever wanted". Magnus overhears Daniela (who was possibly trying to find out if Magnus has a chance with him) asking Matias if "there is anyone new on his mind he might like" to which Matias (who has just had a nasty breakup) answers that he does not have a crush on anyone or want to be in a relationship. After hearing that his crush is not reciprocated, Magnus starts avoiding Matias. When Matias tries to offer support to Magnus while Dahlia is in a coma after being poisoned, Magnus tells Matias to leave him alone without giving him the reason why. Feeling awful for what he said, Magnus opens up to Dahlia about his feelings towards Matias, believing that she would know what he should do. Magnus feels that he needs Matias' support the most, but "it would only fuel his one-sided crush". Afraid that Matias will think he has done something wrong and that Matias will hate him, Magnus tells his grandmother how "Matias has done nothing but been nice, interesting and humorous and caused his crush". Magnus' another friend, Olli Oksa (Sami Sowe) realizes what's going on and tells the rest of their friends, Erika Ekholm (Aida Fanfani), Vertti Seppänen (Akseli Sarvilinna), and Matias' sister, Laila Kajander (Sofia Lehtinen), about Magnus' crush. Laila reminds Olli that "Magnus knows about Matias' ex-girlfriend", so Vertti assumes that "Magnus is afraid of how Matias would react", to which Erika comments that "it would hardly come as a surprise since everyone knows that Magnus is pansexual". Meanwhile, Magnus tries to tell Matias about his feelings but is too nervous to ring his doorbell. While Erika and Vertti are unsure about Magnus' feelings and Laila does not that believe Magnus' feelings are mutual, Olli is hopeful that Magnus and Matias would "become more than friends". When Magnus goes to see his friends at Café Moose, Olli asks him directly if he has a crush on Matias right when Matias walks in. When Matias says he is happy to see Magnus, Magnus acts shy, and leaves claiming that "he has promised to visit his (recently woken up) grandmother", which convinces Erika and Vertti about his crush while Matias believes Magnus hates him. Wanting to solve things between Magnus and Matias, Olli visits Magnus and tells that "there's nothing wrong with him having feelings for Matias". Magnus admits, that he does not knows what he should do, so Olli advices him to tell Matias about his crush. With Olli's encouragement, Magnus invites Matias for a walk so he can tell him how he feels. Some girl smiles at Matias, causing Magnus to hesitate, but manages to solve things with Matias by telling him a different secret. After Magnus tells about his crush to his grandmother, Dahlia decides to find him someone "better" and arranges a date with an heir named Melvin Malbäck, which Magnus is not pleased about. The next day, Magnus meets Paavo Luhtinen, a young man who catches his interest. They later go on a date but are seen by Matias and Olli. After Paavo leaves, Olli asks Magnus if he no longer has feelings for Matias. Magnus answers (not being completely honest) that "Paavo helped him get over all of his one-sided feelings". Jealous Matias tells Dahlia that Magnus is dating someone is not rich (like the Mustavaaras) and goes to vocational school, which she disapproves. When their group of friends (excluding Paavo who claimed he had started vomiting) are celebrating Magnus' 18th birthday, drunken Matias kisses Magnus. Next morning Matias claims that he kissed Magnus "because he was drunk and as a joke", which Magnus does not seem happy to hear. When Magnus tells his grandmother about the kiss, Dahlia says that "he has some kind of obsession with Matias", to which Magnus responds that he "just likes Matias, a lot" and "never wants to leave when they are together". Dahlia believes that Magnus ' feelings are mutual and advices him to talk to Matias. With his grandmother' encouragement, Magnus tries to tell Matias how he feels but Matias starts talking about how "he had just drank too much", so Magnus hesitates and leaves. Both feel bad afterwards. When Dahlia asks Magnus, whom he really wants, Magnus answers that he wants Paavo but Dahlia does not believe him. Olli has realized that Matias is reciprocating Magnus' feelings, so he asks Magnus, if he has got completely over his feelings towards him. Magnus responds nervously that "he hasn't thought about the whole thing for a long time" and asks "why would Matias be on his mind", which suggests that Magnus is being not completely honest. After noticing the way Matias looks at him and Paavo at Olli's housewarming party, Magnus asks Matias, if he's avoiding him. He reminds Matias that they have agreed to continue as friends, but kisses him. Magnus later tells Matias, that they should stop fooling around, but confesses to his father that he "still has a crush on his friend". Magnus tells Jiri that he has feelings towards both Paavo and "his friend", whom he reveals to be Matias. After Matias confesses that he is "insanely jealous of him" and that Laila told him about Magnus' feelings, Magnus tells him that he thought Matias was straight and asks "what does it matter if he has feelings for him". Magnus tells Matias that "he wants to be with someone who knows what they want from him and not to be some experiment". Matias asks if Magnus thinks, he's horrible person. Magnus does not answer and leaves. Confused by the situation, Magnus later confesses his feelings towards Matias to Paavo. Paavo tells him to think whom he really wants, but he will not wait for long. Afterwards Magnus tells Jiri how "Paavo told him to forget Matias" and asks "how he can forget someone he thinks non-stop". Matias later run into Matias, who invites him to hang at his home. They start making out immediately after stepping in and end up having sex. Next morning Magnus tells Jiri and Dahlia what happened. Magnus wants to talk with Matias about what happened but they end up kissing and are seen by Melvin. After Paavo breaks up with Magnus, he and Matias have conversation about possible relationship. When Magnus tells Jiri and Dahlia about what Paavo did, despite Magnus saying that he does not want to "hop into new relationship" immediately, Dahlia announces that he and Matias are now a couple. Magnus and Matias seal that with a kiss. They agree to keep their relationship as a secret for now but tell almost immediately about it to Olli, who's overjoyed by it. When it's time for Magnus to do his civilian service at Rovaniemi, Matias suggests that he could go with him and do his military service there. Magnus tells Matias that he is "the right one" for him.
- Tatu Juhani Väre, portrayed by Marko Nurmi, is a policeman and father of his son, Hugo (Lenni Jyllinmaa), to whom he has a joint custody with his ex-husband, Jyrki Väre. Tatu meets Kalle Laitela in the hospital while getting tetanus vaccine for Hugo due a dog bite. Kalle falls for him at first sight but is sure that "Tatu is straight and married". When Tatu and his co-worker, Linda Eerikäinen (Monika Lindeman) talk about their love lives, Tatu tells her that he recently divorced from his husband due being cheated by him. Tatu tells Linda, he needs to have a doctor's check up and hopes to get "one interesting and handsome doctor" but is sure that "the doctor is not gay". When Kalle does the check up, Tatu feels he is enjoying it little too much, so he tries to distract himself by naming Finnish presidents in his mind. Later Tatu and Kalle end in the same gym's sauna, which leads Kalle (who gets arroused) to use the same trick Tatu used (but can not remember when Risto Ryti was president). Later they match on Tinder (both use their shared middle name on their profiles). After their planned date fails due misunderstanding Kalle runs into Linda who tells him what happened to Tatu. Kalle realizes that Tatu was the "Juhani" whom he was supposed to meet. Kalle goes to meet Tatu at the police station and tells him, that he was the "Juhani" Tatu was going to meet. They agree to go on new date but Kalle's father, Ismo disapproves it due having been arrested for speeding by Tatu. Aware of his father's disapproval towards Tatu, Kalle lies that he is going to see "his friend, Jaakko, who is a cardiologist" and tricks him to different place. Despite their date going well, Tatu starts acting distant, which causes alcoholic Kalle to start drinking again. Tatu later asks Kalle for a new date but Kalle has decided to focus on his recovery so he politely declines. Later Tatu runs into (unknowingly) Kalle's ex-husband Sampo Kaukovaara whom he goes to coffee date with. Unbeknownst to them, Kalle sees them. They later end up having sex at the inn Sampo owns and lives in. Kalle sees Tatu (who's undercover) kissing a woman (the suspect) and tells Sampo (who's his close friend) about it. This causes a fight between them but they manage to reconcile. When Kalle ends up (due misunderstanding) as a nude model at the art class Tatu goes to due his mission, they both clearly enjoy the situation (Kalle even asks Tatu to "draw him like one of his French girls" in his mind) but Tatu tries to distract himself. Kalle later asks what's the deal with Tatu and "that woman", so Tatu tells him that he is undercover and kisses Kalle. They later coincidentally end up at the gym at the same time. Tatu tries to ignore Kalle but can not forget the kiss or "how good he looked when modeling". Even though Kalle fully supports Tatu's relationship with Sampo, he struggles with intense heartache and experiences relapse. Kalle asks Sampo's help with his drinking, so he takes Kalle in his room where they find naked Tatu from his bed. Drunken Kalle suggests threesome, which both Tatu and Sampo consent after Tatu questions if Kalle is too drunk to do it. However, Tatu and Kalle focus on each other, leading Tatu wonder how Sampo must have felt. Afterwards, Tatu asks Sampo how he felt, so Sampo accuses him of ignoring him. After Sampo tells Tatu about Kalle's heartache, Tatu goes to meet Kalle and asks him directly if he relapsed because of him. Kalle confesses his feelings towards him but Tatu reminds him that he's with Sampo and leaves. However, when he has some free time at the police station, Tatu makes pros & cons-list of Kalle and Sampo (Kalle's only pro is drawn heart). After Sampo gets caught of blackmailing his business partner's husband, Tatu breaks up with him and ends up having sex with Kalle at the hospitals storageroom. Sampo later sees them kissing and accuses Tatu of treating him as a consolation prize. However, Sampo wishes that three of them could remain friends. When Tatu and Kalle start planning moving-in together, Kalle who has never lived alone before, tells Tatu that wants to wait a bit longer. Angered Tatu ends up having sex with Jyrki.
- Melvin Malbäck, portrayed by Samuli Ainasvuori, is a rich boy, whom Dahlia Mustavaara arranges date with her grandson, Magnus. Melvin's arrogant behavior and "poor booktaste" lead Magnus to storm out. Next day Magnus runs into his crush Matias Kajander and tells him that he was on a date with "someone who would make Cheek look humble and modest". After Magnus starts dating a guy (look Paavo Luhtinen below) Dahlia disapproves, Dahlia tries to get Melvin and Magnus together in front of Paavo, which angers Magnus. When Magnus tells Dahlia that he kissed "another guy" (Matias), Dahlia is breefly hopeful that it would have been Melvin. Paavo later runs into Melvin who tells him that he saw Magnus with Matias but does not tell that he saw them kissing. Paavo soon breaks up with Magnus and ends up hanging with Melvin. When Paavo and Melvin later see Magnus and Matias on the street, they decide to "give Magnus a show" and kiss. Afterwards they have a lunch and Paavo offers to cook for Melvin. However Melvin needs to return to Switzerland where he studys, so it has to wait. When Melvin returns to Finland, he and Paavo are invited to Paavo's boss' party where they go to as their first date. Next morning when Kalle Laitela comes to Café Moose for a morning coffee, he opens up to Paavo and Melvin about his own romantic problems. Melvin advices Kalle to tell the man he likes (look Tatu Väre above) how he feels. Next time Melvin is in Helsinki, he tells Paavo how much he missed him and asks him to move to Switzerland with him.
- Paavo Luhtinen, portrayed by Luka Töyrä, is a cooking student who meets Magnus Mustavaara in library when they both grab the same book, Jäähyväiset aseille from a shelf. Paavo gives Magnus his favorite book, Querelle that he was going to recycle. Magnus takes interest in Paavo and hopes to meet him again. Magnus finds Paavo's number from inside Querelle and sends him a message. Magnus' father, Jiri Viitamäki is suspicious that Paavo (who is around Magnus' age) is some old groomer, so when Paavo asks Magnus to meet him, Jiri tells Magnus to meet Paavo in a public place. They go on a date at Café Moose but are seen by Magnus' crush Matias Kajander, who does not seem happy to see them together. Magnus' friends want to meet Paavo, so he invites him to hang with them. While Erika Ekholm, Vertti Seppänen, Olli Oksa and Matias' sister, Laila Kajander love Paavo, Matias does not like him. This makes Olli realize that Matias is jealous of Magnus, so Matias tells him that "Magnus would get and deserve someone a lot better". Matias tells Magnus' grandmother that Magnus is dating someone who is not rich and goes to vocational school, which she (possibly unbeknowst to Matias) disapproves. Over time Paavo starts believing that Matias hates him and all another gays. When they coincidentally end up at Café Moose at same time, Paavo intentionally provokes Matias and they start fighting. Later Paavo asks, "how Magnus can be such homophobe's friend". Magnus later confesses his feelings towards Matias to Paavo, who wonders, how Magnus can have a crush on "such homophobic idiot". Magnus tells him that his feelings are mutual and that he and Matias have kissed, twice. Jealous Paavo tells him to think whom he really wants, but he will not wait for long. Paavo runs into Melvin Malbäck who tells him that he saw Magnus with Matias, so Paavo goes to see Magnus, who blurts him that he slept with Matias. Enrageded Paavo breaks up with Magnus and ends up hanging with Melvin. Matias later tries to explain Paavo why he acted the way he did but Paavo refuses to listen him. When Paavo and Melvin later see Magnus and Matias on the street, they decide to "give Magnus a show" and kiss. Afterwards they have a lunch and Paavo offers to cook for Melvin. However Melvin needs to return to Switzerland where he studys, so it has to wait. When Magnus organizes a graduation party, Paavo ends up working as a caterer so they manage to solve things between them. Paavo remains friendly with Magnus' friends. When Magnus' alcoholic neighbour, Kalle Laitela comes to Café Moose, where Paavo works at, he asks Paavo if he is "Jiri's son's ex". After Kalle has couple of (alcoholic) drinks, he starts flirting with Paavo who politely rejects him. Paavo and Melvin are invited to Paavo's boss, Alissa Nikkinen's (Johanna Puhakka) party where they go to as their first date. Kalle is also invited and he apologizes Paavo for how he acted. Next morning when Kalle comes to Café Moose for a morning coffee, he opens up to Paavo and Melvin about his own romantic problems. Next time Melvin is in Helsinki, he asks Paavo to move to Switzerland with him. Paavo tells him that he still has to finish his studies and has his job.
- Veikko, portrayed by Deniz Kaya, is a man who matches with Kalle Laitela on Tinder. His first message to Kalle is a photo of his genitals so Kalle blocks him. They later run into each other and Veikko tries to flirt with Kalle but Kalle rejects him.
- Kikka Granberg, portrayed by Viivi Pumpanen, is an inmate after she was caught by the police for drug possession. When Kikka lends a prepaid phone to another female inmate, who happens to be Mira Angervuo's biological mother Joanna Lumijoki (who accidentally killed Mira's dad as self defence) she is asked how much she's owed. Kikka suggests sex as a payment, which straight Joanna (Johanna Anttila) politely declines. Later they kiss though and even end up having sex but that is Joanna's (successful) plan to get out of the prison by first seducing Kikka and then busting her and a prison guard for drugs.
- Matias Kajander, portrayed by Elmeri Ylä-Rautio, is a young man, who first has a crush on Erika Ekholm but starts dating Kerttu Mäkeläinen (Inka Ylönen), losing his virginity to her. When Erika has trouble with her boyfriend Vertti Seppänen, Matias (believing that he now has a chance with her) breaks up with Kerttu. After learning that she was just a consolation prize, Kerttu takes a revenge on Matias by sending a picture of his genitals (which he sent to her with consent) to whole school. This makes everybody (excluding Matias' friends) to believe he is a pervert, which leads humaliated Matias to flee to his mother, Susu Honkanen (Tuuli Mattila) at Kerava. After messaging with his male friend (and secret admiarer) Magnus Mustavaara, Matias returns to Pihlajakatu claiming that he has moved on from Erika. After Matias returns, it is hinted that he might reciprocate Magnus' feelings. When Matias' cousin Daniela Axelsson (who's aware of Magnus' feelings after noticing how he was looking at Matias) asks Matias if he has anyone new on his mind, Matias (possibly not being completely honest) tells her that he does not have crush on anyone or want to be in a relationship. Magnus overhears them and starts avoiding him, which frustrates Matias. Matias tries to offer his support to Magnus, whose grandmother is in a coma due to poisoning, but Magnus does not want to "fuel a one-sided crush" and tells Matias to leave him alone. Believing that Magnus is mad at him, Matias decides to do what Magnus asked and stay away from him. Noticing how much Matias misses Magnus, their mutual friend Olli Oksa (who has realized that Magnus has a crush on Matias) starts hoping that they could become "more than friends", but Matias' sister Laila does not believe Magnus' feelings are mutual because "she knows her brother". Meanwhile, Matias is starting to believe that Magnus hates him. Seeing how sad Matias is, Olli talks to Magnus and tells him how bad his avoidance makes Matias feel. They manage to reconcile, despite Magnus failing to tell Matias about his feelings. After Magnus tells Matias how "he was on a terrible date" (look Melvin Malbäck above), Matias starts claiming that he is dating a girl named Matilda (it's heavily implied that she does not exist). After Magnus starts dating Paavo Luhtinen, Matias starts showing clear signs of jealousy. When their group of friends are celebrating Magnus' 18th birthday at a rented cottage, drunken Matias tells him that "the relationship with Matilda didn't work out" and kisses Magnus. After Paavo (who was supposed to be sick) joins them, Matias spends rest of the evening sulking and eventually passes out (or falls asleep) at the cottage's beach. Next morning Matias claims that he kissed Magnus "because he was drunk and as a joke". However, after the trip Matias starts showing more and more signs that he harbors feelings for Magnus. Olli notices that something is bothering Matias, but he refuses to tell Olli what's wrong. When Magnus tries to tell Matias how he feels, Matias feels embarrassed about the kiss and starts talking about how "he had just drank too much", so Magnus hesitates and leaves. Both feel bad afterwards and Matias starts avoiding Magnus. Matias later tells Olli, how there is not relationship with Matilda (claiming that it did not work) and after having few beers, Matias tells Olli about the kiss. Though Olli tells him that he does not care who kisses whom, Matias tries to convince him (and possibly himself) that he is straight and gives Olli the same explanation that he gave to Magnus. Olli realizes that Matias has a crush on Magnus, so he tells Olli that he has always had crushes only on girls and says that they need to forget whole thing. After Olli runs into and talks to Magnus, he tells Matias that they should remain just friends, which clearly upsets Matias. After Olli becomes the Kajander's roommate, he asks how Matias feels about Magnus coming to his housewarming party. Matias claims that he has overcome his feelings for Magnus, but decides to not participate to the party. After having beer with Vertti, Matias tells him that, "Matilda broke up with him" and tries to confess to Olli via voice message (which he likely did not send), that he lied about his feelings towards Magnus. When Matias shows up to Olli's party, Magnus notices, how he looks at him and Paavo before going to his bedroom. Magnus asks Matias, if he's avoiding him and reminds him that they agreed to continue as friends, but kisses Matias. Matias seems willing to "to go further", but Magnus thinks they should return the party. When Laila is suffering from broken heart, Matias tells her that she isn't only one with heartache. He confesses that he has a crush on "someone who's taken" and that it's Magnus, to her disbelief. He also tells her about the kiss at the cottage, so Laila tells Matias about Magnus' crush. After Matias fights with Paavo (due being provoked by him), Magnus confronts Matias about his hostility towards Paavo. Matias confesses that he is "insanely jealous of him". Magnus tells him that he thought Matias was straight and that some people spend their whole lives "searching themselves". Magnus says that "he wants to be with someone who knows what they want from him and not to be some experiment". Matias says that he doesn't want to "experiment" and asks if Magnus thinks, that he's horrible person, to which Magnus does not answer. They later run into each other and Matias invites Magnus to hang at his home. They start making out immediately after stepping in and end up having sex (despite Magnus technically still being together with Paavo). Matias tells Olli next day that sex with Magnus "was perfect". Matias later goes to meet Magnus, who wants to talk. They end up kissing. After Paavo breaks up with Magnus, he and Matias become a couple. They agree to keep their relationship as a secret for now but tell almost immediately about it to Olli, who's overjoyed by it. When it's time for Magnus to do his civilian service at Rovaniemi, Matias suggests that he could go with him and do his military service there. Magnus tells Matias that he is "the right one" for him. When they leave to the airport Matias tells Magnus that he has never been as happy as he's been with Magnus.
- Jyrki Väre, portrayed by Väinö Weckström, is an ex-husband of Tatu Väre. They divorced because Jyrki cheated on Tatu. Despite Jyrki's cheating they seem to be in good terms and have a joint custody over their son, Hugo. Hugo calls Jyrki "Faija". After meeting Tatu's new man, Kalle Laitela, Jyrki praises him and advices Tatu to "hold on to him". However, when Jyrki learns that Tatu is moving in with Kalle, he does not seem happy. After arguing with Kalle, Tatu ends up having sex with Jyrki. Jyrki reminds Tatu afterwards that they divorced for a reason and promises to not tell Kalle about Tatu's "miss step"

=== Uusi Päivä ===
Uusi Päivä (Brand New Day) was a Finnish soap opera/drama series shown from Monday to Wednesday and broadcast by Yle. It aired in years 2010–2018. Show take place in a fictional town somewhere in Kanta-Häme called Virtaus (means "flow" in Finnish) and Tampere. It takes place in same universe as Kotikatu.

- Petra Kaakko, portrayed by Amira Khalifa is a bisexual business woman and working for a solar panel company called Suner as a sales manager. She is dating a guy named Lauri Kallio (Panu Mikkola) on and off (due Lauri struggling to understand bisexuality) but after falling in love with his best friend, Elina Haavisto (Sanni Haahdenmaa) and finding out that Lauri is secretly in love with Elina too, they break up for good. She was told to have had at least one girlfriend, Jenni, before attending the show.
  - Jenni is an unseen swimmer, whom Petra Kaakko had a relationship with before coming to Virtaus. Petra's boyfriend couldn't accept her past relationship with a woman and Petra revealed that Jenni's swimming career has left her with dislike towards trophies.
- Emmi Lukkari, portrayed by Suvi Hurme, is originally a student at Virtaus high school. Although marrying her high school boyfriend, Tomi Karhu (Antti Väre), she develops feelings for another girl, Tiia Friman (Eva Adamson), who is dating Emmi's good friend, Jani Hellemaa (Valtteri Lehtinen) at the time. Tiia never found out about Emmi's crush. After leaving to Denmark to participate a project against eating disorders, she falls in love with Jasmin (nicknamed Jaska) and divorces Tomi to be with her. Emmi says she doesn't care if Jaska (or Tomi) is male or female.
  - Jasmin is an unseen character, who met then married Emmi Lukkari when they were on Denmark working in a project against eating disorders. They fall in love and Emmi divorces her husband. Though Jasmin was never seen, it's implied, that she is unattractive.
- Jesse, portrayed by Niklas Haapaniemi, is a gay male model, who is working in a music video project with Tomi Karhu and Iris Rainio (Amelie Blauberg). He mistakes Tomi for a gay when they have a conversation about why Tomi (who has a mutual crush on Iris) is struggling with relationships after his ex-wife fell in love with a woman.
- Iiro Rainio, portrayed by Miro Puranen, is a student in Virtaus high school where he befriends with Helminen twins, Pyry, whom he later starts bullying and Kaisla, whom he starts dating. Iiro is revealed to be a closeted gay, though reluctant to admit that to others, let alone to himself. His father's homophobia is assumed to be the biggest reason he is afraid to come out. After Pyry confesses his feelings towards Iiro who later falls for Pyry too, Iiro dumps Kaisla without telling her why. Iiro is a great dancer and reveals everyone (including his father and big sister Iris) he likes men with a help of a speech and a dance. His father, Saku Rainio (Janne Virtanen) disowns him because of his sexuality but Iris makes him reconcile with his son.
- Pyry Helminen, portrayed by Toni Nikka, is an openly gay first-year student at Virtaus high school. He falls in love with Iiro Rainio who is unable to become terms with his sexuality. When Iiro finally comes out they have problems since Pyry's twin sister Kaisla (Eeva Rajakangas) used to date Iiro. When Kaisla finds out, she is mortified of their relationship but realizes in time that her brother is very happy now and gives her blessing to them. They have other upps and downs but stay a couple till the end of the show.

== France ==
=== Demain nous appartient ===
Demain nous appartient is a French television soap opera broadcast by TF1, which has aired since July 2017.

- Sandrine Lazzari, portrayed by Juliette Tressanini: Pansexual; She was first with Laurence Moiret, but it is stated that she fell in love with two men, Joaquim Dulac and Guillaume Delcourt. She is currently with Morgane Ghého who is mtf (male to female transgender).
- Laurence Moiret, portrayed by Charlotte Valandrey: Lesbian; She was formerly engaged with Sandrine Lazzari.
- Sara Raynaud, portrayed by Camille Genau: Bisexual; After losing her boyfriend Lyès Beddiar, she fell in love with his cousin Yasmine Beddiar. After that ended, she went in a relationship with Bart Vallorta. She is currently with Roxane Thiemen.
- Bart Vallorta, portrayed by Hector Langevin: Pansexual; It is stated in an episode that he is pansexual.
- André Delcourt, portrayed by Vincent Nemeth: Gay; in the episode that aired on 25 December 2018, he reveals that he does not feel attracted to women.
- Morgane Gého, portrayed by Marie Cattrix: is a Transgender and Lesbian nurse at school.
- Roxane Thiemen, portrayed by Raphaëlle Volkoff: Is a Lesbian hacker.
- Jack Dumas-Roussel, portrayed by Dimitri Fouque: Is a closeted gay high school student.
- Gabin Gosselin, portrayed by Luca Malinowski: is Bart's Gay associate.
- Hugo Quéméré, portrayed by Alexandre Prince: Is Gay and one of Bart's love interests.
- Yasmine Beddiar, portrayed by _____: Is the Lesbian niece of Bilel Beddiar..
- Etienne Cochin, portrayed by Martin Barlan: He is Openly Gay.
- Julien Humbert, portrayed by Alexis Loizon: Is an Openly Gay prison guard.

=== Ici tout Commence ===
Ici tout Commence is a French television soap opera broadcast by TF1, which has aired since November 2020. It takes place in the same universe as Demain nous Appartient.

- Elliott Prevost, portrayed by Nicolas Anselmo: is a gender non-conforming pansexual student at the institute. He enjoys wearing makeup and seems to have a preference for boys.
- Greg Delobel, portrayed by Mikael Mittelstadt: is a gay student at the institute and Elliott's boyfriend. He's the son of a world-renowned chef and Lionel's best friend.
- Claire Guinot, portrayed by Catherine Marshall: is a bisexual cooking teacher and chef. She mostly dated men and is now dating Olivia.
- Ambre Martin, portrayed by Claire Romain: is a sexually fluid polyamorous student at the institute. She is in a relationship with Solal.
- Solal Fayet, portrayed by Benjamin Douba Paris: is a sexually fluid polyamorous student at the institute. He is in a relationship with Ambre and Celia
- Celia Gessac, portrayed by Rebecca Benhamour: is a student at the institute. She's bi-curious.
- Lilian, portrayed by Robin Rouby: Is gay and was Greg's lover and first time. They ended their relationship.
- Virgile, portrayed by ___: is a gay guy Greg found on a gay dating site.
- Olivia Listrac, portrayed by Virginie Caliari: is a vegan chef and possibly pansexual. She previously identified as heterosexual and is now dating Claire Guinot.

=== Plus belle la vie ===
Plus belle la vie is a French television soap opera broadcast by France 3, which has aired since August 2004.

- Juliette Frémont, portrayed by Juliette Chêne, is a bisexual girl. Juliette is Ninon's good friend and she kissed Ninon once, but Ninon wanted none of it. She broke up with Lucas after Lucas fell in love with Samia.
- Cristal Balester, portrayed by Fadia Dumont, is the partner of Lea, who she began dating after the end of her relationship with Lea's brother.
- Lea Leroux, portrayed by Charlotte Deysine, is the sister of Valentin, who begins dating his former partner, Cristal.
- Thomas Marci, portrayed by Laurent Kerusoré, is the openly gay bar tender of the local café, Le Mistral, who develops relationships with several other characters before marrying a doctor.
- Nicolas Barrel, portrayed first by Alexandre Thibault, and then Nicolas Herman, arrived in the series when he started in the Marseille police force. She soon got to know Thomas and they ended up together through many twists and turns. Nicolas loves Thomas and basically fears losing him all the time. Thomas and Nicolas' love relationship is put to the test when Nicolas' wife appears in Mistral.

== Germany ==
=== Alles was zählt ===
Alles was zählt is a German soap opera, airing on RTL since 2006. The show revolves around a fictional sports and wellness centre in Essen, initially focusing on ice skating with other sports being added to the repertoire throughout the show's run.

- Roman Wild, portrayed by Dennis Grabosch, appeared on the show between 2006 and 2011. He was a gay competitive figure skater, who had relationships with Andrew, Mark and Deniz. He dies of a brain tumour.
- Andrew Wellington, portrayed by Dennis Rodney Durant, briefly appeared on the show in 2006 as Roman's boyfriend. He leaves for a job in London.
- Deniz Öztürk, portrayed by Igor Dolgatschew, appears on the show since 2007. He is the first Turkish character in a German soap opera who came out as gay and was later revised to bisexual. He was in a long on/off relationship with Roman and has had a few one night stands with other men. Other relationships, especially after Roman's death in 2011 include females only.
- Marc Hagendorf, portrayed by Timo Hübsch, briefly appeared on the show in 2010. He was Roman's first relationship but they broke up as Marc refused to come out. He comes to Essen to win Roman back.
- Joscha Degen, portrayed by Carlo Degen, appeared on the show from 2013 to 2014. Joscha is gay and enters a relationship with Kai and is faced with homophobia as a professional soccer player.
- Dr. Kai Seebach, portrayed by Alexander Gier, appeared on the show from 2013 - 2014. He is an openly gay sports doctor at the sports centre and has a relationship with Joscha. The two leave for Hanover.
- Ina Ziegler, portrayed by Franziska van der Heide is an openly lesbian cook and the older sister of Lucie. Ina works in the snack bar "Pommes Schranke," and often does catering jobs for the Steinkamp corporation. She has a one-night stand with Chiara Nadolny and who she also kissed twice and who later falls in love with her. Ina has feelings for her too.
- Chiara Nadolny, portrayed by German-Italian actress Alexandra Fonsatti is a figure skater. She was in a relationship with Ronny but she chose her career over him and broke up with him. Somewhere she meets Ina Ziegler and they became good friends. When she found out that Ina is gay she became more distant, because she thought Ina wants to hit on her. This thought made her uncomfortable. But after a talk, they became good friends again. Over the time it becomes clear that Chiara has fallen in love with Ina but does not admit it to herself. With Ina, Chiara shows her loving side, which normally does not happen with anyone, as she is generally considered arrogant and has therefore been nicknamed "Ice Diva".

=== Gute Zeiten, schlechte Zeiten ===
Gute Zeiten, schlechte Zeiten is a long-running German television soap opera, first broadcast on RTL in 1992. The program concerns the lives of a fictional neighborhood in Germany's capital city Berlin.

- Fabian Moreno, portrayed by Ralf Benson, appeared on the show from 1996 to 2004. He entered the show with his then girlfriend presumably as a straight character but later falls in love with Philip Krüger and comes to terms with being bisexual. This remained his only same-sex relationship.
- Philip Krüger, portrayed by Laurent Daniels, appeared on the show from 1997 to 2000. Philip is an openly gay DJ who enters a relationship with Fabian. Later he gets together with Simon and the two even join in a (pre same-sex marriage) civil partnership. After their break-up the character moves locations to appear in the serial's short-lived spin-off Großstadtträume.
- Simon Nilsson (actually Thomas Rieplich), portrayed by Herbert Ulrich, appears on the show from 1999 to 2000. After he marries Philip he is being arrested for the murder of the real Simon Nilsson and stealing his identity.
- Leonard "Lenny" Cöster, portrayed by Alexander Becht, appeared on the show from 2007 to 2010. After initially rebuffing Carsten Reimann and bullying him for being homosexual, he comes to terms with his own homosexuality, and the two begin a relationship.
- Carsten Reimann, portrayed by Felix Isenbügel, appeared on the show from 2008 to 2010. He befriends Lenny and eventually falls in love with him, which turns out to be requited.
- Andrea "Anni" Brehme, portrayed by Linda Marlen Runge, appeared in the serial between 2013 and 2017. Jasmin's soulmate. Anni is an openly out lesbian and working sound engineer, initially develops a tumultuous friendship with flatmate Jasmin that progresses to unrequited love, until Jasmin begins to see Anni in a new light, slowly accepting her developing sexual feelings towards Anni that turn into a full romantic and public relationship.
- Jasmin Flemming, portrayed by Janina Uhse, appeared in the serial between 2008 and 2017. Anni's soulmate. Jasmin struggles with her developing romantic and sexual feelings towards Anni, constantly denying them and calling herself "hetero". After a bet, they fall into bed and eventually become estranged from Jasmin's constant denial of her feelings and inability to label herself. Anni leaves for Barcelona and Jasmin realizes her love for Anni. After publicly announcing it and trying to win her flatmate back, Anni decides to give their relationship a try, which becomes a full-fledged romance.
- Katrin Flemming, portrayed by Ulrike Frank, has appeared in the serial since 2002. She is Jasmin's straight biological mother, who surprisingly ends up developing a crush on Anni.

=== Hand aufs Herz ===
Hand aufs Herz is a German television soap opera broadcast by Sat.1 until June 2011 and by sixx thereafter. It began airing in October 2010 and ceased airing in September 2011.

- Emma Müller, portrayed by Kasia Borek, is a nerdy, exemplar student who forms a relationship with Jenny.
- Jenny Hartmann, portrayed by Lucy Scherer, is a new, popular student who forms a relationship with Emma.

=== Lindenstraße ===
Lindenstraße is a German soap opera broadcast by Das Erste, which has aired since December 1985.

- Carsten Flöter, portrayed by Georg Uecker, is a young, gay student who kisses Gert. After graduating, Carsten begins a relationship with Käthe.
- Georg "Käthe" Eschweiler, portrayed by Claus Vinçon, is gay and begins a relationship with Carsten.
- Peter "Lotti" Lottmann, portrayed by Gunnar Solka, is gay, in relation with Carsten.
- Suzanne Richter, portrayed by Susanne Evers, is a lesbian who is in a relationship with Tanja. They are parents to a child.
- Tanja Schildknecht, portrayed by Sybille Waury, is a lesbian who is in a relationship with Suzanne. They are parents to a child.
- Gert Weinbauer, portrayed by Günter Barton, has a kiss with Carsten.

=== Marienhof ===
Marienhof is a German soap opera broadcast by Das Erste, which aired between October 1992 and June 2011.

- Andrea Süsskind, portrayed by Leonore Capell.
- Billi Vogt, portrayed by Katja Keller.
- Annalena Töppers, portrayed by Berrit Arnold.
- Babette von Dornhausen, portrayed by Sybille Heyen.
- Sülo Özgentürk, portrayed by Giovanni Arvaneh.
- Kerstin Töppers, portrayed by Maike Billitis, thinks she is straight but then she starts to have feelings for Juliette. They move to France after dating for a while.
- Juliette Gagnon, portrayed by Maike von Bremen, begins a relationship with Kerstin who she moves to France with.

=== Schloss Einstein ===
Schloss Einstein is a German soap opera for kids about a boarding school broadcast by KiKa. It started airing in 1998.

- Leni Freytag, portrayed by Linda Schablowski, is new at the school and quickly falls for Cäcilia. After a few misunderstandings the two begin a public relationship.
- Cäcilia Amelie von Toll, portrayed by Carlotta Weide, is originally seen flirting with guys. After her first kiss with a guy she gets confused by her lack of feelings and confides into her future girlfriend Leni.

=== Sturm der Liebe ===
Sturm der Liebe is a German television soap opera broadcast by Das Erste, which began airing in September 2005.

- Daniel Brückner, portrayed by Daniel Buder, is originally perceived as heterosexual until his former partner, Chris, arrives and he is revealed to be bisexual.
- Chris Brenner, portrayed by Florian Reiners, is the former partner of Daniel, who tracks him hoping to reunite.
- Boris Saalfeld, portrayed by Florian Frowein
- Tobias Ehrlinger, portrayed by Max Beier

=== Unter uns ===
Unter uns is the second oldest German daily soap opera, that debuted on RTL in 1994. The show focusses on the characters that live in the same multi-family building at the fictional Schillerstaße 10 in urban Cologne. After the show had been heavily criticized for completely disregarding and non-inclusion of LGBT issues and characters, especially for being set in Cologne, one of Germany's most gay-friendly cities, changes were made in 2013.

- Rebecca Mattern, portrayed by Imke Brüger, appeared on the show from 1997 to 2012. Originally portrayed as straight, being married twice and having several other relationships with men. When Sabine Kern came to live with her and her husband Rufus Sturm to get away from her violent fiancé Nils, Bine fell in love with Rebecca and after some time their feelings became mutual and they entered a short-lived relationship that ended when Rebecca realised how much her family meant to her and returned to Rufus. Not long after that she dies at the hands of Rolf Jäger.
- Sabine "Bine" Kern, portrayed by Ela Paul. Appeared on the show from 2011 to 2012. Originally portrayed as straight, arriving together with her longterm boyfriend Nils and his brother Bela. After Nils' violent outbursts and need to control her life became too much for Bine, she fled to Rebecca, who she fell in love with soon after. Their relationship was short-lived as Rebecca returned to her husband when she realised how much her family meant to her. Bine returned to Nils after he started getting help for his problems and she saw how he had changed, they left together after Bine got a job offer at the Bodensee.
- Ingo "Easy" Winter, portrayed by Lars Steinhöfel, appears on the show since 2005. Originally, portrayed as straight and going through several relationships (and a marriage) with women he begins questioning his sexuality after attending Cologne Gay Pride in 2017 and meeting Finn. The two have a short-lived casual affair that confirms his assumption that he is in fact gay. His old rival Ringo helps him coming out to his family and friends and the two end up falling in love.
- Richard "Ringo" Beckmann, portrayed by Timothy Boldt, appears on the show since 2012. Ringo is coming to terms with being bisexual during the first year of the character's run when an old summer fling Yannick enrolls at his high school. Subsequently, Ringo has short-lived affairs with each Yannick and Aaron. He becomes close friends with former rival Easy by helping him come out and eventually falling in love with him.
- Yannick Benhöfer, portrayed by Eric Stehfest, appeared on the show in 2013, as the first love interest for Ringo.
- Aaron Hinz, portrayed by Lukas Sauer, appeared on the show in 2014, and has a short-lived affair with Ringo.
- Finn Welter, portrayed by Jan-Martin Mueller, appeared on the show in 2017, and has a short-lived affair with Easy.
- Hauke "The Hawk" König, portrayed by Moritz von Zeddelmann, appeared on the show from 2017 to 2018. He was in a relationship with Easy but leaves for America to join an American Football Team.

=== Verbotene Liebe ===
Verbotene Liebe is a German television soap opera broadcast by Das Erste, which aired between January 1995 and June 2015.

- Dr. Gero von Sterneck, portrayed by Broder B. Hendrix, is originally portrayed as heterosexual, before coming out and ending his relationship with a woman. He then had a relationship with his mother's partner and his best friend.
- Stefan König, portrayed by Felix Bresser, is a designer and has an affair with both Gero and his mother.
- Sebastian Adler, portrayed by Peter Kotthaus, is a successful advertising manager and creative director of an advertising agency. He has an affair with Gero.
- Dr. Lukas Hagemann, portrayed by Till Claro, is Gero's gay colleague and boss. He has a crush on Gero and later they have a relationship.
- Erika Sander, portrayed by Raphaela Dell, is originally perceived as heterosexual, before beginning a relationship with Nina. They separate but later reunited.
- Nina Ryan, portrayed by Freya Trampert, is a lesbian who has a relationship with Erika.
- Ulli Prozeski, portrayed by Andreas Stenschke, is gay. He comes out and enters a relationship with Tom but separates when Ulli leaves. They reunited when Ulli returned.
- Dr. Tom Seifert, portrayed by Kay Böger, begins a relationship with Ulli. After Ulli leaves, Tom begins a relationship with Oliver which ends after a year. When Ulli returns, they reunite.
- Carla von Lahnstein, portrayed by Claudia Hiersche, is a closeted homosexual. Carla began an affair with married Hanna, which continued until Hanna's death. To hide her sexuality, Carla married a man but later came out and married Susanne. They divorced when Susanne fell in love with their sperm donor. Later Carla began a relationship with Stella, who she left the show with.
- Evelyn Thoma, portrayed by Sarah Maria Besgen, is Carla's former assistant and former lover. Carla quit things with her after starting a relationship with Hanna.
- Hanna Novak, portrayed by Katharina Dalichau, is married to man and thinks she is straight. When Carla von Lahnstein admits her feelings towards her, she later realizes she has fallen for her too and they begin an affair. Hanna leaves her husband but because of Carla's public position does not go public with her relationship. The relationship ended when Hanna died.
- Anke Hoffmann, portrayed by Annika Peiman, has an affair with Carla von Lahnstein.
- Susanne Brandner, portrayed by Claudia Scarpatetti is a bisexual who marries Carla, although they later divorce when Susanne falls in love with their sperm donor.
- Marina Felix, portrayed by Nicole Allmann, has an affair with Carla.
- Oliver "Olli" Sabel, portrayed by Jo Weil, is bisexual who began a relationship with Christian. Following the end of their relationship, Oliver began dating Jo. Olli has had girlfriends too and says he is bi.
- Christian Mann, portrayed by Thore Schölermann, is originally portrayed as straight man who unexpectedly falls in love with Oliver, who has fallen for him too. Christian comes out as gay after a boxing tournament. They eventually get married but later separate.
- Stella Mann, portrayed by Anne Wis, is a lesbian who begins an affair with a bi-curious woman. Later Stella begins a relationship with Carla and they become engaged, eventually departing the serial together.
- Rebecca von Lahnstein, portrayed by Jasmin Lord has bad luck with guys but after her best friend Miriam kisses her on their day out at a wellness center, she realizes she likes girls too. Rebecca and Miriam had a short relationship.
- Miriam Pesch, portrayed by Romina Becks. Miriam kisses her best friend Rebecca on their day out at a wellness center. Later they realize they actually like each other more than just platonically and have a short relationship.
- Marlene von Lahnstein, portrayed by Melanie Kogler thinks she is straight but later falls for her soon-to-be sister-in-law Rebecca von Lahnstein, who is into her too. She left her fiancé in the altar and began a relationship with her. They break up when Rebecca falls for a guy.
- Dr. Jo Helmke, portrayed by Mickey Hardt, is the gay partner of Oliver.

== Ireland ==
=== Fair City ===
Fair City is an Irish television soap opera broadcast by RTÉ One, which has aired since September 1989. In 1996, three years after homosexuality was decriminalised in Ireland, two male characters moved in for a clinch - only to be interrupted. It would have been the first gay kiss on Irish television.

- Yvonne Gleeson, portrayed by Ciara O'Callaghan, is bisexual and dated Connie, who she was engaged to.
- Connie originates from Australia and dated Yvonne, who she was engaged to.
- Laura Halpin, portrayed by Liana O'Cleirigh, is a lesbian who forms a relationship with Emily, which was broken apart following interference.
- Emily Mahon, portrayed by Eimear Morrissey, is the former partner of Laura, whose relationship deteriorated following interference.
- Troy Dowling, portrayed by Andrew Macklin, is openly gay.
- Sash Bishop, portrayed by Stephanie Kelly, is bisexual and was in a relationship with Laura Halpin.
- Cristiano San Martin, portrayed by Rodrigo Ternevoy since 2016, is openly gay, briefly dated Troy Dowling, and was in an abusive relationship with Will Casey.
- Will Casey, portrayed by John Cronin, dated Cristiano San Martin before it was revealed Will had a wife and daughter unbeknownst to Cristiano. After officially leaving his wife Mairéad, Will and Cristiano became more serious and lived together, but after a while Will became abusive and tortured Cristiano physically and mentally.
- John "Bosco" Walsh, portrayed by Rory Cowan since 2019, is a gay character.

=== Ros na Rún ===
Ros na Rún is a long-running Irish soap opera broadcast on TG4, which has aired since November 1996. The soap opera was the first Irish soap to feature an openly gay couple and screened the first gay kiss and the first lesbian kiss shown on Irish television.

- Jack Hayes, portrayed by Diarmuid De Faoite, an openly gay character, appeared in the serial between 1996 and 1999, returning in 2009, was in relationships with Tom Doherty and Owen Collins.
- Tom Doherty, portrayed by Seán Ó Tarpaigh, an openly gay character, appeared in the serial between 1996 and 1998, was in a relationship with Jack Hayes.
- Owen Collins, portrayed by Niall Ó Síoradáin, an openly gay character, appeared in the serial between 1997 and 1999, was in a relationship with Jack Hayes.
- Róise De Búrca, portrayed by Linda Bhreathnach, appeared in the serial between 2000 and 2013, had a brief fling with Tina O'Dowd.
- Tina O'Dowd, portrayed by Tara Breathnach, appeared in the serial between 2008 and 2013, had a brief fling with Róise De Búrca.
- Pádraig Ó Loinsigh, portrayed by Domhnall O'Donoghue, has appeared in the serial since 2012, and is openly gay. In 2018 it is revealed that Pádraig was once married to a woman named Sonia before he realised he was gay, and they have a son together. The marriage ended when Sonia caught Pádraig in bed with her brother.
- Adam Mac Donncha, portrayed by Sean O'Baoill, has appeared in the serial since 2014, and struggled with his sexuality due to his mother's homophobia, but eventually came out as gay in 2016 thanks to the support of Pádraig and Fia, who had been Adam's girlfriend up until she discovered he was gay. In 2019 he began dating Simon Ó Muirí.
- Charlie McCabe, portrayed by Fiona Fitzpatrick, has appeared in the serial since 2019, and is a proud lesbian.
- Simon Ó Muirí, portrayed by Mark Lawrence, has appeared in the serial since 2019, is openly gay, and in a relationship with Adam Mac Donncha.

== Japan ==
=== Botan to Bara ===
Botan to Bara is a Japanese television soap opera broadcast by Tōkai Television Broadcasting, which has aired since January 2004.

- Botan Nojima, portrayed by Nanako Ookouchi, is bisexual, who she lives with Kayo in the last.
- Kayo Kiyohara, portrayed by Maju Ozawa, is bisexual, who she lives with Botan in the last.

=== Uruwashiki Oni ===
Uruwashiki Oni is a Japanese television soap opera broadcast by Tōkai Television Broadcasting, which has aired since April 2007.

- Junko Mayukawa, portrayed by Sayaka Kaneko, is bisexual, who she lives with Yuuko in the last.
- Yuuko Nanami, portrayed by Nagiko Tono, is bisexual, who she lives with Junko in the last.

=== Shin Botan to Bara ===
Shin Botan to Bara is a Japanese television soap opera, remade from Botan to Bara, broadcast by Tōkai Television Broadcasting, which has aired since November 2015.

- Fukiko Okuma, portrayed by Erika Mayuzumi, is bisexual, who she lives with Miwako in the last.
- Miwako Seo, portrayed by Rina Aizawa, is bisexual, who she lives with Fukiko in the last.

== Mexico ==
=== Antes muerta que Lichita ===
Antes muerta que Lichita is a Mexican telenovela broadcast by Canal de las Estrellas, which aired between August 2015 and February 2016.

- Alejandro de Toledo y Mondragón Casablanca, portrayed by Eddy Vilard, is the son of Augusto de Toledo y Mondragón (Eduardo Santamarina) and Beatriz Casablanca de Toledo y Mondragón (Gabriela Platas) who is a closeted gay, at fear of bullying.

=== Volver a empezar ===
Volver a empezar is a Mexican telenovela broadcast by Canal de las Estrellas, which aired between July 1994 and February 1995.

- Paul, portrayed by Radames de Jesus, is an openly gay hairdresser. The character was one of the first openly homosexual characters to feature on the network.

=== Amar a muerte ===
Amar a muerte is a Mexican telenovela written by Leonardo Padrón, produced by W Studios in collaboration with lemon studios for Televisa and Univision, it was broadcast from October 29 of 2018 to March 3 of 2019.

- Valentina Carvajal, portrayed by Macarena Achaga. Valentina is a smart, loving and determined young woman. Daughter of León Carvajal, a well known businessman in Mexico. Unexpectedly, she falls in love with her best friend Juliana Valdés in the midst of all her family troubles.
- Juliana Valdés, portrayed by Bárbara López. Juliana is a fearless, brave and hardworking woman, daughter of "El chino" Valdés, a sicario sentenced to die by electric chair. When she falls in love with her best friend (Valentina Carvajal), both have to face their families and society when they hear about the relationship.

== New Zealand ==
=== Shortland Street ===
Shortland Street is a New Zealand prime-time soap opera broadcast by TVNZ 2, which began airing in May 1992. The show featured the first same-sex kiss on New Zealand television.

- Dr Meredith Fleming, portrayed by Stephanie Wilkin, appeared on the serial in 1992 and 1993. She was initially involved in relationships with men, but later became involved with women.
- Jamie Forrest, portrayed by Karl Urban, appeared on the serial between 1993 and 1994. Jamie is an openly gay paramedic who began a relationship with Jonathan.
- Jonathan McKenna, portrayed by Kieren Hutchison, appeared on the serial between 1993 and 1996 and again in 2011. Jonathan had a relationship with Jamie.
- Jay Copeland, portrayed by Jaime Passier-Armstrong, appeared on the serial between 2004 and 2007. Jay is a lesbian who was married to Maia until her death.
- Maia Jeffries, portrayed by Anna Jullienne, appeared on the serial between 2004 and 2011. Maia is a lesbian who was married to Jay. Following Jay's death, Maia began a relationship with Nicole, which ended when she departed.
- Samantha Thomas, portrayed by Ryland Wood, has appeared in the serial between 2006 and 2007. Samantha is an openly transgender female nurse.
- Gerald Tippett, portrayed by Harry McNaughton, appeared on the serial between 2007 and 2010 then again in 2012. Gerald is bi-romantic asexual.
- Nicole Miller, portrayed by Sally Martin, appeared on the serial from 2009 to 2024. Nicole is bisexual and has relationships with Maia, Harper, Zara and Maeve, the last of whom she married in 2020.
- Seth Packhurst, portrayed by Toby Leach, appeared on the serial between 2011 and 2013. Seth is gay and in a secret relationship with Henry.
- Henry Lee, portrayed by Peter Huang, appeared on the serial between 2012 and 2013. Henry is gay and in a secret relationship with Seth.
- Harper Whitley, portrayed by Ria Vandervis, appeared on the serial from 2013 to 2024. Harper is bisexual but realised that only after having a crush on Nicole, who she had a relationship with. In 2024, she had an affair with Phil Grayson until dying after motorcycle accident in September 2024.
- Jack Hannah, portrayed by Reuben Milner, appeared between 2014 and 2023.
- Cam McCaskill, portrayed by Ryan Carter.
- Dion Tai, portrayed by Sonny Tupu.
- Zara Mandal, portrayed by Nivi Summer, had a short relationship with nurse Nicole Miller.
- Maeve Mullens, portrayed by Jess Sayer, is a lesbian character who has appeared since 2020 and began a relationship with Nicole whom she later married. After Nicole got sentenced to 10 years in prison from killing a female psychopath, Maeve and Phil Grayson started growing closer. In August 2025 they kissed after few drinks and friend tattoos.
- Samira Moradi, portrayed by Roxie Mohebbi, had a relationship with her boss Francesca.
- Francesca Telford, portrayed by Sara Wiseman, is a bisexual doctor who had a relationship with Samira.
- Leanne Black, portrayed by Jennifer Ludlam, is Nicole Miller's mother who was initially portrayed as disapproving of her daughter's sexuality. However, in 2020 she met and fell in love with Nicole's mother-in-law Rosalyn and the two formed a relationship. Leanne left her after receiving a cancer diagnosis but didn't tell her why. Rosalyn was told later and came to see her. They made peace after Rosalyn forgave her for not telling. Soon after Leanne died.
- Rosalyn Mullens, portrayed by Theresa Healey, is Maeve's mother who developed a relationship with Leanne after their daughters married each other.
- Phil Grayson, portrayed by Jane Wills, is a bisexual doctor who fell in love with Harper. They developed an affair despite both being in relationships with men. After Harper died from traffic accident and Maeve's wife Nicole was sentenced to prison, mourning Phil and Maeve formed a friendship that emerged to drunken kiss.
- Sage Stewart, portrayed by Peter Burman, is a nurse.
- Sophia Crane, portrayed by Tania Nolan, is a lesbian doctor who starts hitting on Maeve.

== Norway ==
=== Hotel Cæsar ===
Hotel Cæsar is a Norwegian soap opera broadcast by TV 2, which began airing in October 1998.

- Ellen Lavik, portrayed by Maren Bergem Owe, is a lesbian who had a brief relationship with Vilde. Ellen later began a relationship with Sara and they later move to Copenhagen.
- Vilde Mykland, portrayed by Minken Tveitan, is bisexual and had a brief relationship with Ellen.
- Sara, portrayed by Tuva Holmebakk, is the girlfriend of Ellen who she moves to Copenhagen with.

== Portugal ==
=== Santa Bárbara ===
Santa Bárbara is a Portuguese telenovela broadcast by Televisão Independente, which aired between September 2015 and October 2015.

- Antónia Vidal, portrayed by São José Correia.
- Maria Ana Rodrigues, portrayed by Filomena Cautela.

=== Valor da Vida ===
Valor da Vida is a Portuguese telenovela broadcast by Televisão Independente, which aired between September 30, 2018, and May 20, 2019.

- Gabriela «Becas» Brito, portrayed by Teresa Tavares.
- Cláudia Folque, portrayed by Susana Arrais.

== South Africa ==
=== Generations ===
Generations is a South African soap opera broadcast by SABC 1, which aired between February 1994 and September 2014. In 2013, it was speculated that the show had received pressure to write out its homosexual characters.

- Senzo Zondo, portrayed by Thami Mngqolo, appeared in the serial between 2008 and 2014. Senzo is initially perceived as heterosexual before kissing Jason; their kiss sparked a huge controversy with viewers. Senzo's father disapproved of the relationship and physically attacked them. They pursued their relationship and eventually married.
- Jason Malinga, portrayed by Zolisa Xaluva, appeared in the serial between 2009 and 2014. Jason is bisexual and kisses Senzo, which was received with criticism. Senzo's father disapproved of the relationship and physically attacked them. They pursued their relationship and eventually married.

=== Isidingo ===
Isidingo is a South African soap opera, which features English dialogue. It began airing on SABC 3 in July 1998, when it was known as Isidingo: The Need, a title used until 2001.

- Steve Stethakis, portrayed by Emmanuel Castis, is gay and appeared in the serial between 1998 and 2006. He was originally involved in many relationships, before eventually marrying Luke after gay marriage was legalised.
- Len Cooper, portrayed by Chris Beasley, is bisexual and has appeared in the serial since 2001. Len and Steve had a relationship and worked together at the television studio.
- Paul McPherson, portrayed by Carl Beukes, is a talk show host and journalist who suffers from bipolar disorder. He appeared in the serial between 2005 and 2008 and had a relationship with Steve.
- Luke, portrayed by Gary D'Alessandro, is the husband of Steve who appeared in the serial in 2006. They married days after the legalisation of gay marriage.
- Prada Naicker, portrayed by Ashish Gangapersad, is the gay cousin of Priya, who appeared in the serial between 2010 and 2014. Prada and Dennis have a brief relationship.
- Dennis M, portrayed by Ashley Dowds, appeared in the serial in 2011 and has a brief relationship with Prada.

== South Korea ==
=== Life Is Beautiful ===
Life Is Beautiful is a South Korean television soap opera broadcast by SBS TV, which has aired since November 2010.

- Kim Kyungsoo, portrayed by Lee Sangwoo, is gay. He lives with Taesub in a lasting, functional relationship; the first of its kind to be portrayed on Korean television weekend family programming.
- Yang Taesub, portrayed by Song Changeui, is gay and in a happy relationship with Kyungsoo.

== Spain ==
=== Amar en tiempos revueltos ===
Amar en tiempos revueltos is a Spanish soap opera broadcast by La 1 and TVE Internacional from 2005 to 2012, and by Antena 3 since 2013.

- Ana Rivas, portrayed by Marina San José, is a department store worker who develops romantic feelings for Teresa.
- Teresa Garcia, portrayed by Carlota Olcina, is a department store worker who begins a relationship with Ana.

=== Goenkale ===
Goenkale ("High Street" in English) was a Basque soap-opera, produced by Pausoka Entertainment and ETB, which was broadcast every Monday and Tuesday on Basque Radio-television's first channel, ETB 1. Set in an imaginary Basque seaside town, the title of the serial is the name of the main street in that town. First broadcast in 1994, it was one of the most successful programmes of ETB 1. It ended in 2015 after 22 seasons and 3.707 episodes.

- Nekane Beitia, portrayed by Itziar Ituño, is a police officer who unexpectedly falls in love with her roommate Naroa, even though she has a hard time dealing with it. They soon however become a couple. She has never been in love with a woman before.
- Naroa, portrayed by Naroa Agirre. Falls in love with her roommate Nekane who soon reciprocates the same feelings. They start to date.

=== Seis Hermanas ===
Seis Hermanas is a Spanish soap opera broadcast by La 1, which began airing in April 2015 and ceased airing in April 2017.

- Celia Silva, portrayed by Candela Serrat, is one of six sisters whose dream is to study and to write. She realises that she has romantic feelings for a heterosexual colleague and after being rejected, she visited the doctor where she met Aurora who she began dating.
- Aurora Alarcón, portrayed by Luz Valdenebro, is the partner of Celia.
- Federico Velasco, portrayed by Dani Muriel, is a police detective who befriends Celia and confesses he is gay.

== Taiwan ==
=== Ordinary Love ===
Ordinary Love is a Taiwanese television soap opera broadcast by SET Taiwan, which has aired since November 2013.

- Chiang Hsiao-ting, portrayed by Carolyn Chen, is bisexual, who she lives with Sih-yao in the last.
- Fang Sih-yao, portrayed by Li Liang-chin, is bisexual, who she lives with Hsiao-ting in the last.

== United Kingdom ==
=== Brookside ===
Brookside is a British soap opera broadcast by Channel 4, which aired between November 1982 and November 2003.

- Gordon Collins, portrayed by Nigel Cowley between 1982 and 1984, and Mark Burgess between 1986 and 1990, is the first openly gay character on a British soap opera. Gordon's main relationship is with Chris.
- Ginnie played by Jill Connick in 1986 and has a romantic relationship with Barbara Black.
- Barbara Black played by Brenda Elder in 1986. Barbara divorced her husband Nicholas Black and begins a relationship with Ginnie.
- Margaret Clemence, portrayed by Nicola Stephenson, appeared in the serial between 1990 and 1994.
- Lindsey Corkhill, portrayed by Claire Sweeney, appeared in the serial on-off between 1991 and 2003. Lindsey begins a relationship with Shelley, which ended when Shelley departs.
- Beth Jordache, portrayed by Anna Friel, appeared in the serial between 1993 and 1995. Beth features in British television's first pre-watershed lesbian kiss, which received several complaints.
- Shelley Bower, portrayed by Alexandra Wescourt, appeared in the serial between 1999 and 2001. Shelley begins a relationship with Lindsey, which she ends after developing feelings for Lindsey's mother, Jackie.
- Lance Powell, portrayed by Mickey Poppins, appeared in the serial between 2000 and 2003.
- Fred Gonzalez portrayed by, Richard Calkin, appeared between 2000 and 2001.

=== Coronation Street ===
Coronation Street is a British soap opera broadcast by ITV, which has aired since 9 December 1960.

- Tracy Barlow, portrayed by Kate Ford from 2002 onwards. Tracy is believed to be heterosexual her entire life; however, on New Year's Day 2020, she has a one-night stand with Paula Martin (Stirling Gallacher), and it transpires that she embarked on multiple sexual flings with women when she was imprisoned for murder.
- Sophie Webster, portrayed by Brooke Vincent, appeared in the serial regularly between 1994 and 2019. Sophie comes out as a lesbian in 2010 after entering a relationship with Sian Powers (Sacha Parkinson), becoming the first lesbian character in Coronation Street. She later has relationships with Amber Kalirai (Nikki Patel), Jenna Kamara (Krissi Bohn), Maddie Heath (Amy James-Kelly), Kate Connor (Faye Brookes) and Paula Martin (Stirling Gallacher).
- Hayley Cropper, portrayed by Julie Hesmondhalgh, appeared in the serial between 1998 and 2014. Hayley is a transgender woman and the first regular transgender character to be introduced into soap opera. She later marries a man. The character was praised by the UK Parliament
- Todd Grimshaw, portrayed by Bruno Langley on-off between 2001 and 2017, and later Gareth Pierce from 2020 onwards. Todd is the show's first homosexual character, who is originally portrayed as heterosexual. He kisses his girlfriend Sarah Platt's (Tina O'Brien) brother Nick Tilsley (Adam Rickitt), and later begins a relationship with Karl Foster (Chris Finch). Upon his return in 2013, Todd embarks on relationships with Marcus Dent (Charlie Condou), Billy Mayhew (Daniel Brocklebank) and Theo Silverton James Cartwright.
- Karl Foster, portrayed by Chris Finch, appeared in the serial between 2003 and 2004. Karl is an openly gay nurse, who has a relationship with Todd Grimshaw (Bruno Langley).
- Sean Tully, portrayed by Antony Cotton, has appeared in the serial since 2003. Sean is openly gay and unlucky in love. Sean has been criticised by the media; he has had relationships with Sonny Dhillon (Pal Aron), Marcus Dent (Charlie Condou) and Billy Mayhew (Daniel Brocklebank).
- Amber Kalirai, portrayed by Nikki Patel, appeared in the serial between 2005 and 2009, and again between 2011 and 2012. Amber is bisexual, and has a relationship with Sophie Webster (Brooke Vincent).
- Asha Alahan, portrayed by Tanisha Gorey, has appeared in the serial since 2006. She was originally portrayed as heterosexual until she begins a relationship with Nina Lucas (Mollie Gallagher), and tells her father Dev (Jimmi Harkishin) that she is going on a date with Nina. He questions if she is a lesbian, and she responds that she does not want to label herself, adding: "I just like people. But in this case it's a female person." Her love interest also includes Sienna Milburn (Charlotte Tyree).
- Sonny Dhillon, portrayed by Pal Aron, appeared in the serial between 2006 and 2007. Sonny is bisexual and has an affair with Sean Tully (Antony Cotton) while engaged to a woman, Michelle Connor (Kym Marsh).
- Carla Connor, portrayed by Alison King, has appeared in the serial since 2006. Carla is initially portrayed as being heterosexual, engaging with relationships and marriages with various men. In 2024, Carla began to develop feelings for DS Lisa Swain (Vicky Myers). They eventually have sex, begin a public relationship, and move in together, later marrying.
- Marcus Dent, portrayed by Charlie Condou, appeared in the serial between 2007 and 2008, and between 2011 and 2014. Marcus is openly gay and has relationships with Sean Tully (Antony Cotton) and Todd Grimshaw (Bruno Langley). In 2012, Marcus begins a relationship with a woman, Maria Connor (Samia Longchambon), but later decides that he prefers men.
- Ted Page, portrayed by Michael Byrne, appeared in the serial between 2008 and 2010. Ted is the gay father of Gail Platt (Helen Worth).
- Sian Powers, portrayed by Sacha Parkinson, appeared in the serial between 2009 and 2011. Sian is a bisexual woman who pursues a relationship with Sophie Webster (Brooke Vincent); however, she also has a relationship with Ryan Connor (Ben Thompson).
- James Cunningham, portrayed by James Roache, appeared in the serial between 2010 and 2011. James is gay, which causes his rejection by his father, Lawrence Cunningham (Linus Roache).
- Jenna Kamara, portrayed by Krissi Bohn, appeared in the serial between 2012 and 2014. Jenna is a lesbian who begins a relationship with Sophie Webster (Brooke Vincent).
- Aiden Lester, portrayed by Toby Sawyer, appeared in the serial briefly in 2012. Aiden is gay and a love interest for Marcus Dent (Charlie Condou).
- Maddie Heath, portrayed by Amy James-Kelly, appeared in the serial between 2013 and 2015. Maddie is a lesbian who begins a relationship with Sophie Webster (Brooke Vincent).
- Billy Mayhew, portrayed by Daniel Brocklebank, appeared in the serial from 2014 to 2026. Billy is a gay vicar who pursues relationships with Sean Tully (Antony Cotton), Todd Grimshaw (Bruno Langley) and Paul Foreman (Peter Ash).
- Kate Connor, portrayed by Faye Brookes, appeared in the serial between 2015 and 2019. Kate is a lesbian who was engaged to Caz Hammond (Rhea Bailey), but later dated Sophie Webster (Brooke Vincent) and Imogen Pascoe (Melissa Johns), until eventually ending up with Rana Habeeb (Bhavna Limbachia).
- Caz Hammond, portrayed by Rhea Bailey, appeared in the serial between 2015 and 2016. Caz is a lesbian who is engaged to Kate Connor (Faye Brookes). However, she develops an unhealthy infatuation with Maria Connor (Samia Longchambon).
- Rana Habeeb, portrayed by Bhavna Limbachia, appeared in the serial between 2016 and 2019. Rana is introduced as heterosexual and marries Zeedan Nazir (Qasim Akhtar). However, she later develops strong feelings towards Kate Connor (Faye Brookes), and ultimately leaves Zeedan for her.
- Imogen Pascoe, portrayed by Melissa Johns, appeared briefly in both 2017 and 2018. Imogen is a lesbian and has a brief relationship with Kate Connor (Faye Brookes).
- Paul Foreman, portrayed by Peter Ash, appeared in the serial between 2018 and 2024. Paul is gay, and had a relationship, and eventual marriage, with Billy Mayhew (Daniel Brocklebank).
- Paula Martin, portrayed by Stirling Gallacher, appeared in the serial between 2018 and 2020. Paula is a bisexual lawyer with a daughter, and has a relationship with Sophie Webster (Brooke Vincent), and later a one-night stand with Tracy Barlow (Kate Ford).
- James Bailey, portrayed by Nathan Graham from 2019 to 2022, and Jason Callender from 2025 onwards. James is gay and a professional footballer who is yet to come out to his teammates, so Bethany Platt (Lucy Fallon) pretends to be his girlfriend. He has relationships with Danny Tomlinson (Dylan Brady) and Carl Webster (Jonathan Howard).
- Nina Lucas, portrayed by Mollie Gallagher, has appeared since 2019. Although having a relationship with Seb Franklin (Harry Visinoni) until his death in a hate crime attack, Nina later begins a relationship with Asha Alahan (Tanisha Gorey) in 2021.
- Danny Tomlinson, portrayed by Dylan Brady, briefly appeared in 2020. Danny is gay, he is introduced as a love interest and secret boyfriend of James Bailey (Nathan Graham/Jason Callender).
- DS Lisa Swain, portrayed by Vicky Myers, has appeared since 2021 as recurring character. In March 2024, Lisa became a regular character. Lisa is a lesbian detective sergeant, who is mourning the loss of her wife Becky Swain, with whom she has a daughter, Betsy Swain (Sydney Martin). Lisa eventually begins a relationship with Carla Connor (Alison King) and they get married.
- Theo Silverton, portrayed by James Cartwright, had appeared in the serial from 2025 to 2026. Theo is a scaffolder who begins a sexual affair with Todd Grimshaw (Gareth Pierce), despite being married to his wife Danielle Silverton (Natalie Anderson) and having two children. It is later revealed that Theo has been undergoing conversion therapy, and suffers from internalised homophobia. Theo ends up in a coercive relationship with Todd to which he abuses him and they get married.
- Carl Webster, portrayed by Jonathan Howard, has appeared in the serial since 2025. Initially believed to be heterosexual, Carl embarks on an affair with his uncle Kevin Webster's (Michael Le Vell) wife Abi Webster (Sally Carman). However, following a disagreement with Abi, Carl later flirts and has sex with James Bailey (Jason Callender), confirming him to be bisexual. A conversation with his mother Debbie Webster (Sue Devaney) revealed that Carl had previously been in a relationship with a man back in Germany.
- Becky Swain, portrayed by Amy Cudden, appeared briefly in the serial from 2025 to 2026. Becky is the wife of Lisa Swain (Vicky Myers) who was believed to have died while on duty. In reality, Becky was living under a false identity in Spain. She returned to Weatherfield in 2025 to try and get Lisa and their daughter, Betsy Swain (Sydney Martin), back. She caused a rift between Lisa and her fiancée Carla Connor (Alison King).

=== Doctors ===
Doctors is a British soap opera broadcast on BBC One which aired between March 2000 and November 2024.

- Ben Kwarme, portrayed by Ariyon Bakare, appeared in the serial from 2001 to 2005. He was bisexual and had relationships with Faith Walker (Eva Fontaine) and Oliver Berg (Laurence Penry-Jones).
- Oliver Berg, portrayed by Laurence Penry-Jones, appeared in the serial from 2002 to 2003. He had relationships with Alex and Ben Kwarne (Ariyon Bakare).
- Greg Robinson, portrayed by Ben Jones, is a gay man who appeared in the serial from 2003 to 2007. Greg married Rico Da Silva (Felix D'Alviella), which marked history as the first gay wedding on British television.
- Rico Da Silva, portrayed by Felix D'Alviella, is a gay man who appeared in the serial from 2006 to 2007. Rico married Greg Robinson (Ben Jones), which marked history as the first gay wedding on British television.
- Izzie Torres, portrayed by Bethan Moore, is a pansexual girl who first appeared in 2008. She comes out to her father as pansexual after he incorrectly assumes that her friend is gay.
- Simon Bond, portrayed by David Sturzaker, appeared in the serial from 2009 to 2011. Simon had a relationship with a married paramedic, Will Duncan. When his colleague, Charlie Bradfield (Philip McGough), discovered this, he gave Simon homophobic abuse.
- Imogen Hollins, portrayed by Charlie Clemmow, is a bisexual woman who first appeared in the serial in 2009. She has a brief relationship with schoolfriend Elise Stone (Hannah Steele). Imogen initially labels herself as a lesbian, but later dates men too.
- Freya Wilson, portrayed by Lu Corfield, is a bisexual woman that appeared in the serial from 2011 to 2012. She was in a relationship with Mandy Marquez (Danielle Henry), however also slept with a man, Kevin Tyler (Simon Rivers).
- Mandy Marquez, portrayed by Danielle Henry, is a lesbian that appeared in the serial from 2012 to 2014. She was in a relationship with Freya Wilson (Lu Corfield).
- Emma Reid, portrayed by Dido Miles, is a pansexual woman who first appeared in the serial in 2012. She was in a relationship with Lena Baker (Josephine Butler) and Jasmine Dajani (Lara Sawalha).
- Sean Donoghue, portrayed by Shane O'Meara, is a gay man who appeared in the serial in 2015. Chris came out as gay to his sister, Niamh Donoghue (Jessica Regan).
- Lena Baker, portrayed by Josephine Butler, is a bisexual woman who appeared in the serial from 2016 to 2020. She was initially married to a man, but had an affair with Emma Reid (Dido Miles).
- Will Hurran, portrayed by Robin Morrissey, is a gay man who appeared in the serial in 2018. He is the nephew of established character Jimmi Clay (Adrian Lewis Morgan). He had a short-lived relationship with Mattie Fielding (Griffin Stevens), and later had a relationship with Ben Galadima (Michael Fatogun).
- Mattie Fielding, portrayed by Griffin Stevens, is a gay man who appeared in the serial in 2018. He had a short relationship with Will Hurran (Robin Morrissey).
- Ben Galadima, portrayed by Michael Fatogun, is a gay man who appeared in the serial in 2018. Ben initially introduces himself as straight, but after he has a relationship with Will Hurran (Robin Morrissey), he comes out as gay to his colleagues.
- Jasmine Dajani, portrayed by Lara Sawalha, is a lesbian who appeared in the serial in 2020 and 2022. She was in a relationship with Emma Reid (Dido Miles).
- Luca McIntyre, portrayed by Ross McLaren, is a gay man first appeared in the serial in 2021. He was in a relationship with Billy Parker (Daniel Cornish).
- Suni Bulsara, portrayed by Rahul Arya, is a bisexual man who first appeared in the serial in 2023. Luca McIntyre (Ross McLaren) learns that Suni is bisexual after he flirts with both Luca and colleague Scarlett Kiernan (Kia Pegg).

=== EastEnders ===
EastEnders is a British soap opera broadcast on BBC One, which has aired since 19 February 1985. The show has used various homosexual characters to highlight gay issues since the 1980s, including homophobia, bisexuality, age of sexual consent, and HIV/AIDS among others. It was the first UK soap to screen a gay kiss in 1987, prompting outrage from viewers and the media who branded the programme "filth" and dubbed it "EastBenders". There were even questions in Parliament about whether it was appropriate to have gay men in a family show when AIDS was sweeping the country. Despite initial negativity, the characters had a powerful impact on public attitudes, and the show's handling of Colin and Barry's relationship was deemed by many gay activists as something of a breakthrough. Actor turned politician Michael Cashman believes the storyline started "the social change" in opinion towards homosexuals, which "happened alongside the legal reform" in the 1980s.

The show has been at the centre of much controversy regarding its gay characters kissing on-screen. It screened the first mouth-to-mouth gay soap kiss in the UK in 1989, leading some MPs to call for the programme to be banned. EastEnders' first regular lesbian characters provided the soap with its first lesbian kiss in 1994, provoking more complaints than any other UK television programme that year. This was followed by a "censored" homosexual kiss in 1996, which infuriated gay activists after the BBC cut the kiss from its original two seconds to a half-second, so they would not "startle" viewers. In 2007, a lesbian kiss prompted 211 complaints to the BBC, and in 2008, a kiss between two gay characters prompted 145 complaints from viewers who were "appalled by the display of homosexual kissing before the watershed [...] whilst young children are watching". The BBC released a statement saying: "We approach our portrayal of homosexual relationships in the same way as we do heterosexual relationships. In this instance, Christian is enjoying the first flush of romance and we've shown him being affectionate with his new boyfriend in the same way any couple would."

- Ruth Lyons, portrayed by Judy Liebert, appeared in the serial between 1985 and 1986. Ruth is a lesbian social worker, who is in a relationship that she considers the same as marriage.
- John Fisher, portrayed by Dave Dale, appeared in the serial in 1986. John is a drag queen act hired to perform in The Queen Victoria public house.
- Colin Russell, portrayed by Michael Cashman, appeared in the serial between 1986 and 1989, before returning briefly in 2016 and 2022. Colin is gay, although he does not originally reveal this until he introduces his boyfriend, Barry Clark (Gary Hailes). Colin's other relationships include Guido Smith (Nicholas Donovan) and Eddie Tsang (Kevin Shen).
- Barry Clark, portrayed by Gary Hailes, appeared in the serial between 1986 and 1988, before returning briefly in 1989 and 2022. Barry is openly gay although he is closeted to his volatile father. Barry dates Colin Russell (Michael Cashman) until his father discovers their relationship and so, to appease his father, Barry pretends to be heterosexual, although it does not work and he reunites with Colin.
- Guido Smith, portrayed by Nicholas Donovan, appeared in the serial between 1988 and 1989. Guido is gay and begins a relationship with Colin Russell (Michael Cashman) until their departures when they separate.
- Joe Wallace, portrayed by Jason Rush, appeared in the serial in 1991 and 1993. Joe is a young, gay chef who is HIV-positive. He is sacked from his job as a result of status.
- Sonia Fowler, portrayed by Natalie Cassidy, has appeared in the serial from 1993 to 2007 and from 2014 to 2025, with guest appearances in 2010 and 2011. Sonia is bisexual and despite being married to a man, Martin Fowler (James Alexandrou/James Bye), she begins an affair, and later relationship, with Naomi Julien (Petra Letang) in 2006. Sonia later reunited with her husband, although following their divorce, she has a relationship with Tina Carter (Luisa Bradshaw-White).
- Della Alexander, portrayed by Michelle Joseph, appeared in the serial between 1994 and 1995. Della is the serial's first lesbian character, who was introduced as an attempt to portray positive examples of homosexual characters.
- Binnie Roberts, portrayed by Sophie Langham, appeared in the serial between 1994 and 1995. Binnie is a lesbian and the partner of Della Alexander (Michelle Joseph).
- Tony Hills, portrayed by Mark Homer, appeared in the serial between 1995 and 1999. Tony is bisexual and has relationships with women and men, most notably with Simon Raymond (Andrew Lynford).
- Simon Raymond, portrayed by Andrew Lynford, appeared in the serial between 1996 and 1999. Simon is gay and has a relationship with Tony Hills (Mark Homer).
- Fred Fonseca, portrayed by Jimi Mistry, appeared in the serial between 1998 and 2000. Fred is the square's local GP, whose sexuality is met with criticism by his patients.
- Derek Harkinson, portrayed by Ian Lavender, appeared in the serial between 2001 and 2005, before returning in 2016. Derek is an elderly gay man, and one of his storylines includes having a conviction for gross indecency overturned under the "Alan Turing law".
- Naomi Julien, portrayed by Petra Letang, appeared in the serial between 2005 and 2007. Naomi began an affair with the married Sonia Fowler (Natalie Cassidy), which developed into a relationship.
- Marco Bianco, portrayed by Bart Ruspoli, appeared in the serial in 2007. Marco is a gay interior designer whose boyfriend left him.
- Charity Kase, portrayed by Morgan Crowley, appeared in the serial in 2007 and 2009. Charity is a drag queen act hired to perform in The Queen Victoria public house.
- Oscar Branning, portrayed by Pierre Counihan-Moullierr, first appeared between 2007 and 2017, before returning on a more permanent basis in 2025. Upon his return, Oscar is confirmed to be bisexual.
- Steven Beale, portrayed by Aaron Sidwell, appeared in the serial regularly between 2007 and 2008, before returning from 2016 to 2017. Steven is bisexual and comes out after kissing Christian Clarke (John Partridge). Steven has also had relationships with women Stacey Slater (Lacey Turner), Lauren Branning (Jacqueline Jossa) and Abi Branning (Lorna Fitzgerald).
- Christian Clarke, portrayed by John Partridge, appeared in the serial between 2008 and 2012, before returning on-off between 2014 and 2016. Christian is a gay man who is mainly involved in a relationship with Syed Masood (Marc Elliott), although has aided the coming outs of Steven Beale (Aaron Sidwell) and Ben Mitchell (Joshua Pascoe), and has sex with Lee Thompson (Carl Ferguson).
- Lee Thompson, portrayed by Carl Ferguson, appeared in the serial in 2008. Lee is gay and has sex with Christian Clarke (John Partridge).
- Syed Masood, portrayed by Marc Elliott, appeared in the serial between 2009 and 2012. Syed is initially a closeted homosexual, whose Islamic religion prevents him from coming out. After beginning an affair with Christian Clarke (John Partridge), despite being engaged to a woman, Amira Shah (Preeya Kalidas), Syed is eventually outed. He and Christian later marry.
- James Mackie, portrayed by Paul Keating, appeared in the serial in 2009. James is gay and a childhood friend of Christian Clarke (John Partridge), who he later has a fling with.
- Ben Mitchell, portrayed by Charlie Jones, Joshua Pascoe, Harry Reid and Max Bowden, appeared in the serial regularly on-off from 2006 to 2024. Ben is originally portrayed as a camp child, who enjoys singing and dancing. After Pascoe was cast in the role, Ben comes out and loses his virginity. After receiving a negative response from his father, Phil Mitchell (Steve McFadden), Ben hides his sexuality again and after Reid was cast in the role, Ben began a relationship with Abi Branning (Lorna Fitzgerald), hoping to hide his sexuality. He has an affair with Paul Coker (Jonny Labey) and later comes out, having sex with Johnny Carter (Ted Reilly) in the wake of Paul's death. Ben later starts a relationship with Callum Highway (Tony Clay) in 2019, despite Callum being engaged to Whitney Dean (Shona McGarty). Ben and Callum later marry.
- Danny Pennant, portrayed by Gary Lucy, appeared in the serial between 2012 and 2014. Danny is bisexual and originally has a love triangle with Syed Masood (Marc Elliott) and Christian Clarke (John Partridge). Upon returning in 2013, Danny has flings with women, Janine Butcher (Charlie Brooks) and Lucy Beale (Hetti Bywater), although later has sex with Johnny Carter (Sam Strike).
- Tina Carter, portrayed by Luisa Bradshaw-White, appeared in the serial between 2013 and 2020. Tina is a lesbian who has had relationships with Tosh Mackintosh (Rebecca Scroggs) and Sonia Fowler (Natalie Cassidy); her relationship with Tosh is abusive and had a positive reception from charities. She also slept with Sophie Dodd (Poppy Rush) while in a relationship with Sonia. However, she has also had flings with men, such as Billy Mitchell (Perry Fenwick).
- Johnny Carter, portrayed by Sam Strike between 2013 and 2014, Ted Reilly between 2016 and 2018 and Charlie Suff from 2024 onwards, is originally a closeted homosexual. He comes out to his father, Mick Carter (Danny Dyer), which was widely praised by critics. He has sex with Danny Pennant (Gary Lucy), Ben Mitchell (Harry Reid), Gianluca Cavallo (Gabriele Lombardo), and Callum Highway (Tony Clay).
- Tosh Mackintosh, portrayed by Rebecca Scroggs, appeared in the serial in 2014. Tosh is a lesbian and in a relationship with Tina Carter (Luisa Bradshaw-White). She physically abuses Tina; the storyline received a positive reception from charities.
- Gianluca Cavallo, portrayed by Gabriele Lombardo, appeared in the serial in 2014 as a guest character. He is openly gay and has a fling with Johnny Carter (Sam Strike), who he later begins an off-screen relationship with.
- Paul Coker, portrayed by Jonny Labey, appeared in the serial between 2015 and 2016. Paul is openly gay and begins an affair with Ben Mitchell (Harry Reid) which develops into a relationship, but Paul is killed in a homophobic attack.
- Kyle Slater, portrayed by Riley Carter Millington, appeared in the serial between 2015 and 2016. Kyle is a transgender man.
- Sophie Dodd, portrayed by Poppy Rush, appeared briefly in the serial in 2016. Sophie is a lesbian and a close friend of Kyle Slater (Riley Carter Millington). Sophie has sex with Tina Carter (Luisa Bradshaw-White), despite Tina being in a relationship with Sonia Fowler (Natalie Cassidy).
- Eddie Tsang, portrayed by Kevin Shen, appeared in the serial briefly in 2016. Eddie is the fiancé of Colin Russell (Michael Cashman).
- Luke Browning, portrayed by Adam Astill, appeared in the serial in 2017. He has a brief relationship with Ben Mitchell (Harry Reid).
- Irene Mills, portrayed by Melanie Kilburn, appeared briefly in the serial in 2017. She is the new vicar at the church Dot Branning (June Brown) volunteers at.
- Bernadette Taylor, portrayed by Clair Norris, appeared in the serial between 2017 and 2025. She is initially shown as a heterosexual, beginning a relationship with and becoming impregnated by Callum (Shaun Aylward), but later comes out as a lesbian and confesses her love for her best friend, Tiffany Butcher (Maisie Smith). She also has a short relationship with Brooke (Ria Lopez).
- Callum Highway, portrayed by Tony Clay, has appeared in the serial since 2018. He is initially portrayed as heterosexual, getting engaged to Whitney Dean (Shona McGarty), but had a relationship with a man while serving in the Army, and later began sleeping with Ben Mitchell (Max Bowden) behind Whitney's back. Whitney finds out about the affair and breaks ups with Callum. Callum later comes out as gay to his brother Stuart Highway (Ricky Champ). Callum and Ben later marry.
- Dan and Ashley made a guest appearance in 2018. They are a couple who adopt Daisy (Amelie Smith), who was being fostered by Arshad (Madhav Sharma) and Mariam Ahmed (Indira Joshi).
- Iqra Ahmed, portrayed by Priya Davdra, appeared in the serial between 2019 and 2022. Before moving to Walford, Iqra was in an arranged marriage with a man, but it is later revealed that she is a lesbian. Iqra is the first Muslim lesbian on EastEnders. Ash Kaur (Gurlaine Kaur Garcha) is introduced as the long-term girlfriend of Iqra. After the pair break up, Iqra develops a relationship with Mila Marwa (Ruhtxjiaïh Bèllènéa).
- Ash Panesar, portrayed by Gurlaine Kaur Garcha, appeared in the serial between 2019 and 2023. Ash is a bisexual woman and has a relationship with Iqra Ahmed (Priya Davdra).
- Suki Panesar, portrayed by Balvinder Sopal, has appeared in the serial since 2020. Suki is initially believed to be heterosexual, with a husband, Nish Panesar (Navin Chowdhry) imprisoned for murder and raising a family of four children, and finds her daughter Ash Panesar's (Gurlaine Kaur Garcha) bisexuality uncomfortable. She later tries to kiss her employee, Honey Mitchell (Emma Barton); however, she slaps Honey when she tries to comfort her and later sacks her. Suki later begins to have romantic feelings for Eve Unwin (Heather Peace), and has sex with her, but her eldest son Kheerat Panesar (Jaz Deol) walks in on them. She later explains to Kheerat that she has had romantic feelings for women her whole life, but has remained loyal to her faith and to her husband in prison. Suki and Eve eventually marry.
- Mila Marwa, portrayed by Ruthxjiah Bèllènéa, appeared in the serial between 2020 and 2022. Mila is a lesbian who was kicked out of her religious family home for her sexuality. She develops a relationship with Iqra Ahmed (Priya Davdra).
- Eve Unwin, portrayed by Heather Peace, has appeared in the serial since 2021. Eve is a proud, confident lesbian who is married to Stacey Slater (Lacey Turner), who is straight. Eve develops feelings for Suki Panesar (Balvinder Sopal). They eventually marry.
- Lewis Butler, portrayed by Aidan O'Callaghan, appeared in the serial briefly in 2022. Lewis is a confident gay man who begins working as a barman at the local gay bar, The Prince Albert, and takes an interest in Ben Mitchell (Max Bowden), despite him being married to Callum Highway (Tony Clay). Lewis later rapes a drunken Ben after matching with him on a dating app.
- Felix Baker, portrayed by Matthew James Morrison, appeared in the serial from 2022 to 2025. Felix is a gay drag queen who performs under the pseudonym Tara Misu.
- Josh Goodwin, portrayed by Joshua Vaughan, began appearing in the serial from 2025. He is an "out and proud gay man" who enters a relationship with Oscar Branning (Pierre Counihan-Moullier).
- Ryder Hawkins, portrayed by Felix Uff, began appearing in the serial from 2026. He is gay and is initially not out to anyone, before coming out as gay to his aunt, Nicola Mitchell (Laura Doddington).

=== Emmerdale ===
Emmerdale, previously known as Emmerdale Farm, is a British soap opera broadcast by ITV, which has aired since 16 October 1972. Emmerdale has featured numerous LGBT characters, including the first permanent lesbian character (Zoe Tate) in a British soap opera. It also featured the first civil partnership (between Paul Lambert and Jonny Foster) in a prime time British soap opera in 2008.

- Robert Sugden, portrayed by Ryan Hawley, is a serial character from 1986 to 2005, 2009 only, 2014 to 2019 and then from 2025 onwards. Upon his return in 2014, it is revealed that Robert is bisexual; he is engaged to Chrissie White (Louise Marwood) while having an affair with Aaron Dingle (Danny Miller), who he falls in love with. After battling and finally coming to terms with and accepting his sexuality, Robert splits from Chrissie and starts a relationship with Aaron, whom he marries twice, once in 2017 and then legally in 2018, whilst once cheating on him with Chrissie's half-sister Rebecca White (Emily Head). After his return in 2025, it is revealed that Robert married Kev Barton (Chris Coghill), whilst the pair were imprisoned.
- Zoe Tate, portrayed by Leah Bracknell, appeared in the serial from 1989 to 2005. Zoe comes out as a lesbian in 1993 and has relationships with various women including Emma Nightingale (Rachel Ambler), with whom she has a commitment ceremony in 1996. She is the first permanent lesbian character in a British soap opera.
- Jude Clayton, portrayed by Jocelyn Cunningham, appeared in the serial in 1993. She is a lesbian who had a brief fling with Zoe before they decided to just be friends.
- Emma Nightingale, portrayed by Rachel Ambler, appeared in the serial from 1995 to 1996, before returning briefly in 2004. Emma is a lesbian and has a relationship with Zoe Tate (Leah Bracknell); they have a commitment ceremony in 1996.
- Susie Wilde, portrayed by Louise Heaney, appeared in 1996. Susie is a lesbian and ex-girlfriend of Emma Nightingale (Rachel Ambler). She has a relationship with Zoe Tate (Leah Bracknell).
- Sophie Wright, portrayed by Jane Cameron, appeared in the serial from 1996 to 1997. Sophie is bisexual and has a one-night stand with Butch Dingle (Paul Loughran) before starting a relationship with Zoe Tate (Leah Bracknell).
- Becky Cairns, portrayed by Sarah Neville, appeared in the serial between 1997 and 1998. Becky is bisexual and has an affair with Zoe Tate (Leah Bracknell) while married to Tony Cairns (Edward Peel).
- Frankie Smith, was portrayed by Gina Aris in 1999 and Madeleine Bowyer from 2000 to 2001. Frankie is a lesbian and has a relationship with Zoe Tate (Leah Bracknell).
- Jason Kirk, portrayed by James Carlton, appeared in the serial from 1999 to 2002. Jason is the first openly gay male character to appear in the serial and has an affair with Gavin Ferris (Robert Beck).
- Gavin Ferris, portrayed by Robert Beck, appeared briefly in the serial in 1999. Gavin is bisexual and has an affair with Jason Kirk (James Carlton) while in a relationship with Bernice Blackstock (Samantha Giles).
- Charity Dingle, portrayed by Emma Atkins, appeared in the serial between 2000 and 2005, and from 2009 onwards. Charity is revealed to be bisexual in 2001 when she has an affair with Zoe Tate (Leah Bracknell) while in a relationship with Zoe's brother, Chris Tate (Peter Amory). Zoe was Charity's only female love interest until she had slept with Vanessa Woodfield (Michelle Hardwick) in 2017. The two later began a more serious relationship in 2018.
- Debbie Dingle, portrayed by Charley Webb, appeared in the serial between 2002 and 2021. Debbie is bisexual and although mainly has relationships with men, she had a relationship with Jasmine Thomas (Jenna-Louise Coleman).
- Rachel Whatmore, portrayed by Zoe Lambert, appeared in the serial between 2003 and 2005. Rachel is a lesbian and has an affair with Zoe Tate (Leah Bracknell).
- Aaron Dingle, portrayed by Danny Miller, appeared in the serial from 2003 to 2004, 2006 only, 2008 to 2012 and then from 2014 onwards. Aaron is gay and originally self-loathing regarding his homosexuality, but eventually is able to come to terms with his orientation and comes out. He has a relationship with Jackson Walsh (Marc Silcock) and later begins an affair with Robert Sugden (Ryan Hawley), who he later marries. After both falling in love, Robert and Aaron later marry twice, once in 2017 and then legally in 2018. In 2025, Aaron marries John Sugden (Oliver Farnworth). He also had relationships with Finn Barton (Joe Gill), Alex Mason (Steven Flynn) and Ben Tucker (Simon Lennon).
- Paul Lambert, portrayed by Matthew Bose, appeared in the serial regularly from 2004 to 2009 as well as brief appearances in 2010 and 2015. Paul is openly gay and has had relationships with Ivan Jones (Daniel Brocklebank) and Grayson Sinclair (Christopher Villiers), before marrying Jonny Foster (Richard Grieve) in 2008.
- Effie Harrison, portrayed by Phillipa Peak, made a brief appearance in the serial in 2005. Effie has a brief relationship with Zoe Tate (Leah Bracknell).
- Jasmine Thomas, portrayed by Jenna-Louise Coleman, appeared in the serial from 2005 to 2009. Jasmine is bisexual and has a relationship with Debbie Dingle (Charley Webb).
- Ivan Jones, portrayed by Daniel Brocklebank, appeared in the serial from 2005 to 2006. Ivan is bisexual and has a relationship with Paul Lambert (Matthew Bose) and his sister, Nicola King (Nicola Wheeler).
- Grayson Sinclair, portrayed by Christopher Villiers, appeared in the serial between 2006 and 2008. Grayson is bisexual and involved in a homophobic attack. He had a relationship with Paul Lambert (Matthew Bose).
- Jonny Foster, portrayed by Richard Grieve, appeared in the serial from 2007 to 2009. Jonny is gay and enters a relationship with Paul Lambert (Matthew Bose), who he later marries.
- Arthur Thomas, portrayed by Alfie Clarke, has appeared in the serial since the character's birth in 2007. Arthur is gay and comes out to Nicola King (Nicola Wheeler) in 2022, before being outed at school. Arthur then comes out to his mother, Laurel Thomas (Charlotte Bellamy), and receives support from his schoolmates. He had a relationship with Marshall Hamston (Max Fletcher).
- Matty Barton, portrayed by Grace Cassidy from 2009 to 2012, and Ash Palmisciano since 2018. On his 2018 return, Matty is revealed as a transgender man, the first transgender character on the show. He was formerly called Hannah, and left the serial in 2012. He transitioned off-screen before his return in 2018.
- Jackson Walsh, portrayed by Marc Silcock, appeared in the serial from 2010 to 2011. Jackson is openly gay and embarks on a relationship with Aaron Dingle (Danny Miller).
- Ali Spencer, portrayed by Kelli Hollis, appeared in the serial from 2011 to 2015. Ali is bisexual and was previously married to Dan Spencer (Liam Fox), with whom she has two children. She has a relationship with Ruby Haswell (Alicya Eyo), whom she marries in 2014.
- Ruby Haswell, portrayed by Alicya Eyo, appeared in the serial from 2011 to 2015. Ruby is a lesbian and has a relationship with Ali Spencer (Kelli Hollis), whom she marries in 2014.
- Vanessa Woodfield, portrayed by Michelle Hardwick, has appeared in the serial since 2012. Vanessa is shown as heterosexual but developed feelings for her best friend Rhona Goskirk (Zoë Henry) in 2013. After having a serious relationship with Kirin Kotecha (Adam Fielding), Vanessa slept with Charity Dingle (Emma Atkins) in 2017, prompting her to question whether she is bisexual or a lesbian, revealing herself as lesbian. Charity and Vanessa begin a more serious relationship in 2018. Vanessa has other relationships with Fiona Murphy (Yemisi Oyinloye), Suzy Merton (Martelle Edinborough) and Caitlin Todd (Caroline Harker).
- Finn Barton, portrayed by Joe Gill, appeared in the serial from 2013 to 2017. Finn is openly gay and slept with Aaron Dingle (Danny Miller) and Kasim Sabet (Ethan Kai).
- Lawrence White, portrayed by John Bowe, appeared in the serial from 2014 to 2018. Lawrence is a closeted gay who later comes out when he begins a relationship with Ronnie Hale (John McArdle). He reveals that he was imprisoned for his sexuality and subjected to aversion therapy to try to "cure" his feelings for men, a process that did great damage to him psychologically.
- Liv Flaherty, portrayed by Isobel Steele, appeared in the serial from 2016 to 2022. Liv is the first asexual character on a British soap, confessing to Belle Dingle (Eden Taylor-Draper) and later Gabby Thomas (Rosie Bentham) that she feels no attraction towards boys or girls.
- Ronnie Hale, portrayed by John McArdle, appeared in the serial from 2016 to 2017. Ronnie is openly gay and the former boyfriend of Lawrence White (John Bowe), who he reunites with upon his arrival.
- Kasim Sabet, portrayed by Ethan Kai, appeared in the serial briefly in 2016. Kasim is saved from a car accident by Finn Barton (Joe Gill), who he later begins a relationship with.
- Dr. Alex Mason, portrayed by Steven Flynn, appeared in the serial from 2017 to 2018. A doctor at Hotten General Hospital, he was introduced as a love interest to Aaron Dingle (Danny Miller); the two later begin a relationship but after Aaron realises he is still in love with his ex-boyfriend Robert Sugden (Ryan Hawley), he breaks off their relationship.
- Vinny Dingle, portrayed by Bradley Johnson, has appeared in the serial since 2019. Vinny was portrayed as heterosexual until 2025, when he tries to kiss his friend Kammy Hadiq (Shebz Miah). He begins to question his sexuality, later telling his wife Gabby Thomas (Rosie Bentham) that he does not think he is gay but he is not completely straight either. He later begins a relationship with Lewis Barton (Bradley Riches).
- Luke Posner, portrayed by Max Parker, appeared in the serial from 2019 to 2021. His backstory involves having a relationship with a friend of Ethan Anderson's (Emile John) and was originally heterosexual when he had a relationship with Victoria Sugden (Isabel Hodgins).
- Ben Tucker, portrayed by Simon Lennon, appeared in the serial from 2020 to 2021. His backstory involves being the victim of homophobic bullying from Aaron Dingle (Danny Miller), who he later forms a relationship with. Ben is later murdered by serial killer, Meena Jutla (Paige Sandhu).
- Ethan Anderson, portrayed by Emile John, appeared in the serial from 2021 to 2024. Ethan is a gay man who questions Luke Posner (Max Parker) on his relationship with Victoria Sugden (Isabel Hodgins), since Luke dated Ethan's friend for several months prior to moving to the village. Ethan had a relationship with Marcus Dean (Darcy Grey).
- Fiona Murphy, portrayed by Yemisi Oyinloye, appeared in the serial briefly in 2021. She has a relationship with Vanessa Woodfield (Michelle Hardwick), however later has sex with Nate Robinson (Jurell Carter).
- Marcus Dean, portrayed by Darcy Grey, appeared in the serial from 2022 to 2023. Marcus is a gay man who begins a relationship with Ethan Anderson (Emile John).
- Mary Goskirk, portrayed by Louise Jameson, has appeared in the serial since 2022. Mary is a lesbian who details her relationship with her neighbour, who died from severe acute respiratory syndrome coronavirus 2 during the COVID-19 pandemic.
- Suzy Merton, portrayed by Martelle Edinborough, appeared in the serial from 2022 to 2025. Suzy is a romantic love interest for Vanessa Woodfield (Michelle Hardwick). She later also becomes interested in Mary Goskirk (Louise Jameson).
- Nicky Miligan, portrayed by Lewis Cope, appeared in the serial from 2022 to 2024. Nicky was originally heterosexual, he is a male nanny who begins a relationship with Gabby Thomas (Rosie Bentham) and they later become engaged. However, Nicky is later revealed to be gay and in a secret relationship with his boyfriend. He has another relationship with Suni Sharma (Brahmdeo Shannon Ramana).
- Marshall Hamston, portrayed by Max Fletcher, appeared briefly in the serial in 2023. Marshall is gay and initially teases Arthur Thomas (Alfie Clarke) after he comes out, but he later shares several intimate moments with Arthur. Marshall is living with an extremely religious and homophobic father, and after Arthur's mother Laurel Thomas (Charlotte Bellamy) discovers that Marshall's father is abusing him for being gay, she takes Marshall to live with her and Arthur. Marshall ended up in a relationship with Arthur.
- Suni Sharma, portrayed by Brahmdeo Shannon Ramana, appeared in the serial from 2023 to 2024. He is gay and introduced as the half-brother of Jai Sharma (Chris Bisson), although they had both previously believed that they were cousins. He later begins a relationship with Nicky Miligan (Lewis Cope).
- John Sugden, portrayed by Oliver Farnworth, appeared in the serial from 2024 to 2026. He is gay and introduced as the half-brother of Victoria Sugden (Isabel Hodgins) and as a love interest for Aaron Dingle (Danny Miller), whom he marries. John later becomes a villain after he is revealed to be a serial killer.
- Caitlin Todd, portrayed by Caroline Harker, had appeared in the serial from 2025 to 2026. She is a lesbian doctor and mentions she is married to another woman. Caitlin had a relationship with Vanessa Woodfield (Michelle Hardwick) before she ended up sexually assaulting Vanessa's ex-girlfriend Charity Dingle (Emma Atkins).
- Lewis Barton, portrayed by Bradley Riches, has appeared in the serial since 2025. Lewis is introduced as the half-brother of Ross Barton (Michael Parr) as he was put up for adoption by their mother Emma Barton (Gillian Kearney). He is described as being gay and is autistic. He has a relationship with Vinny Dingle (Bradley Johnson).
- Kev Barton, portrayed by Chris Coghill, has appeared in the serial since 2025. Kev is pansexual and introduced as the husband of Robert Sugden (Ryan Hawley), who he married whilst the pair were imprisoned. He is also later revealed to be the biological father of Lewis Barton (Bradley Riches), after he had a one-night stand with Emma Barton (Gillian Kearney).

=== Family Affairs ===
Family Affairs is a British television soap opera broadcast by Channel 5 from March 1997 until December 2005.

- Adam Sheldrake, portrayed by Vince Leigh, appeared from 1999 to 2000.
- Brendan Boulter, portrayed by Steven Burrell, appeared from 2003 to 2004. Brendan dates Becky and later, Melanie who he marries but has affairs with men before and during the marriage.
- Conor Byrne, portrayed by Glen Mulhern, appeared in 2000
- Karen Ellis, portrayed by Tanya Franks, appeared from 2000 to 2003. Karen is engaged to Matt who she eventually marries but begins an affair with Kelly, their surrogate. Kelly later dies and Karen reconciles with Matt.
- Ben Galloway, portrayed by Peter England, appeared from 2002 to 2003.
- Kelly Hurst, portrayed by Nicky Talacko, appeared from 2001 to 2002.
- Max Lawson, portrayed by Marcus D'Amico, appeared in 2005, is in a gay relationship with Sami but it ultimately breaks down and Max returns to his wife.
- Holly Hart, portrayed by Sandra Huggett, appeared between 1997 and 1999.
- Alex Renshaw, portrayed by Roman Marek, appeared between 2001 and 2002.
- Susie Ross, portrayed by Tina Landini, appeared between 1997 and 1999.
- Sami Shafiq, portrayed by Hosh Kane, appeared in 2005.
- Clive Starr, portrayed by Huw Bevan, appeared between 1999 and 2001.
- Sean Steel. portrayed by Sam Barriscale, appeared from 2003 to 2005.
- Brett Owen, portrayed by Spencer McLaren, appeared in 2005

=== Hollyoaks ===
Hollyoaks is a British soap opera broadcast by Channel 4 and E4 simultaneously. It began airing on 23 October 1995.

- Bazil McCourtey, portrayed by Toby Sawyer, appeared in the serial between 1995 and 1997. Bazil is initially perceived as heterosexual but comes out as gay.
- Gina Patrick, portrayed by Dannielle Brent, appeared in the serial between 1997 and 2001. Gina is a lesbian who establishes a relationship with Emily Taylor (Lorna Pegler).
- Emily Taylor, portrayed by Lorna Pegler, appeared in the serial between 1998 and 2001. She is a lesbian who enters a relationship with Gina Patrick (Dannielle Brent).
- Nick O'Connor, portrayed by Darren Bransford, appeared in the serial between 2001 and 2004. Nick is gay, although he questioned his sexuality after having slept with Jodie Nash (Kate McEnery).
- Craig Dean, portrayed by Guy Burnet, appeared in the serial between 2002 and 2007, returning for a guest stint in 2008. Craig is initially portrayed as heterosexual but later begins identifying as bisexual. He begins a relationship with John Paul McQueen (James Sutton) (see "John Paul McQueen and Craig Dean") behind his girlfriend's Sarah Barnes (Loui Batley) back. Sarah found Craig and John Paul together and breaks up with him, later Craig invites John Paul to go with him to Dublin so they can be together, John Paul agrees. However, with Craig still not being able to display affection to John Paul in public, John Paul leaves before they leave for Dublin. Their relationship ended when Craig left. Craig later returns and commits to a relationship with John Paul and they leave together.
- Sarah Barnes, portrayed by Loui Batley, appeared in the serial between 2005 and 2009. Sarah is originally portrayed as heterosexual until her sexuality is explored following a one-night stand with Zoe Carpenter (Zoë Lister) and she later develops a relationship with Lydia Hart (Lydia Kelly), who later murders Sarah.
- Zoe Carpenter, portrayed by Zoë Lister, appeared in the serial from 2006 to 2010 and briefly in 2017 and again in 2025. Although she has initially appeared as heterosexual, she has a one-night stand with Sarah Barnes (Loui Batley) and claims that she loves her one day.
- Myra McQueen, portrayed by Nicole Barber-Lane, appeared in the serial from 2006 to 2019, and from 2024 onwards. Myra is originally portrayed as heterosexual, although she later comes out after developing feelings for trans woman Sally St. Claire (Annie Wallace).
- John Paul McQueen, portrayed by James Sutton, appeared in the serial between 2006 to 2008, again between 2012 and 2017, and from 2019 to 2026. John Paul is gay, he questioned his sexuality and was outed by his girlfriend Hannah Ashworth (Emma Rigby). He and Craig Dean (Guy Burnet) begin a relationship (see "John Paul McQueen and Craig Dean"), which ended when Craig left. John Paul then dates Spike (Tom Vaughan) and Kieron Hobbs (Jake Hendriks), before reuniting with Craig. Upon his return in 2012, he has a string of relationships with different men, such as Brendan Brady (Emmett J. Scanlan), Doug Carter (PJ Brennan), Danny Lomax (Stephen Billington), Lockie Campbell (Nick Rhys), Scott Drinkwell (Ross Adams), James Nightingale (Gregory Finnegan), George Kiss (Callum Kerr), Carter Shepherd (David Ames) and Jeremy Blake (Jeremy Sheffield) and was married to Ste Hay (Kieron Richardson).
- Kris Fisher, portrayed by Gerard McCarthy, appeared in the serial between 2006 and 2010. Kris is bisexual and a crossdresser and enters a love triangle between him, Ravi Roy (Stephen Uppal) and Nancy Hayton (Jessica Fox).
- Ste Hay, portrayed by Kieron Richardson, has appeared in the serial since 2006. Ste is initially perceived as heterosexual and has two children with Amy Barnes (Ashley Slanina-Davies) but comes out as gay after an affair with Brendan Brady (Emmett J. Scanlan). Ste began a relationship with Brendan but was abused by him briefly as Brendan struggled massively to accept his sexuality and took it out on him, marking the first homosexual domestic abuse storyline in soap. Ste and Brendan eventually became a couple once Brendan learned to accept his sexuality fully and changed for the better. Ste's other relationships have included Noah Baxter (Law Thompson), Doug Carter (PJ Brennan), John Paul McQueen (James Sutton), Harry Thompson (Parry Glasspool), Ryan Knight (Duncan James), James Nightingale (Gregory Finnegan), Rex Gallagher (Jonny Labey) and Dillon Ray (Nathaniel Dass). Whilst married to John Paul, Ste slept with Sinead O'Connor (Stephanie Davis).
- Spike, portrayed by Tom Vaughan, appeared in the serial between 2007 and 2008. Spike is openly gay and begins a relationship with John Paul McQueen (James Sutton).
- Harry Thompson, portrayed by Parry Glasspool, appeared in the serial regularly from 2007 to 2009, 2013 only and 2015 to 2019. Harry is gay, although he is closeted. After coming out, Harry kisses John Paul McQueen (James Sutton) and later marries Ste Hay (Kieron Richardson) after forming a relationship. Harry then has an affair with James Nightingale (Gregory Finnegan) and the pair have an on-off relationship before Harry's death in 2019. Harry also worked as a male prostitute for gay men, though he later impregnates a woman, Sadie Cressington (Alexa Lee), after a drunken one-night stand.
- Kieron Hobbs, portrayed by Jake Hendriks, appeared in the serial in 2008. Kieron is a gay priest who came out to John Paul McQueen (James Sutton), resulting in them beginning an on-off fling.
- Ravi Roy, portrayed by Stephen Uppal, appeared in the serial between 2008 and 2010. Ravi is bisexual but very masculine. Ravi is involved in a love triangle between him, Kris Fisher (Gerard McCarthy) and Nancy Osborne (Jessica Fox).
- Lydia Hart, portrayed by Lydia Kelly, appeared in the serial between 2009 and 2010. Lydia is a lesbian and the former girlfriend of Charlotte Lau (Amy Yamazaki), and the love interest of Sarah Barnes (Loui Batley) who she begins a relationship with.
- Charlotte Lau, portrayed by Amy Yamazaki, appeared in the serial between 2009 and 2010. Charlotte is a lesbian and the former girlfriend of Lydia Hart (Lydia Kelly).
- Lucas Hay, portrayed by Oscar Curtis since 2023, has appeared since 2009. Lucas is gay and begins questioning his sexuality whilst having feelings for Dillon Ray (Nathaniel Dass), they later begin a relationship. Lucas was almost the victim of conversion therapy at the hands of Carter Shepherd (David Ames) whilst struggling with his sexuality.
- Jason Costello, portrayed by Victoria Atkin, appeared in the serial between 2010 and 2011. Jason experiences gender dysphoria and is a gay transgender man.
- Brendan Brady, portrayed by Emmett J. Scanlan, appeared in the serial between 2010 and 2013. Brendan is a closeted gay at the start of his appearance on the show and begins a relationship with Ste Hay (Kieron Richardson). After falling in love with Ste, Brendan develops an anger towards himself and does not accept his sexuality and begins talking it out on Ste, marking the first time gay domestic abuse had been explored in soap. Later, once Brendan has grown as a person and finally learned to accept himself for who he is and his sexuality, he and Ste get back together and form a healthier relationship with no abuse. Despite his sexuality, Brendan has had heterosexual relationships and has sons with his ex-wife Eileen Brady (Rachel Doherty). He also has a relationship with John Paul McQueen (James Sutton).
- Fern, portrayed by Amy Gavin, appeared in the series between 2010 and 2011. Fern is a lesbian who bullies trans boy Jason Costello (Victoria Atkin) because of his gender dysphoria.
- Texas Longford, portrayed by Bianca Hendrickse-Spendlove, appeared in the serial between 2010 and 2013. Texas is bisexual and becomes involved in a love triangle with Jodie Wilde (Montana Manning) and Dodger Savage (Danny Mac).
- Doug Carter, portrayed by PJ Brennan, appeared in the series between 2010 and 2013. Doug is originally portrayed as heterosexual, although he later comes out gay after developing feelings for Ste Hay (Kieron Richardson). They begin a relationship and later marry but their marriage ends quickly after Ste realizes he's still in love with Brendan Brady (Emmett J. Scanlan). Doug and Ste later reconcile but their relationship is cut short once more after Doug dies from a bombing. Doug also has a relationship with John Paul McQueen (James Sutton).
- Noah Baxter, portrayed by Law Thompson, appeared in the series in 2011. Noah is a gay personal trainer who establishes a relationship with Ste Hay (Kieron Richardson).
- Esther Bloom, portrayed by Jazmine Franks, appeared in the serial between 2011 and 2018. Esther is an open lesbian and romances Tilly Evans (Lucy Dixon) as well as having relationships with Kim Butterfield (Daisy Wood-Davis) and Grace Black (Tamara Wall).
- Tilly Evans, portrayed by Lucy Dixon, appeared in the serial between 2011 and 2014. Tilly is a lesbian who is comfortable with her sexuality and has relationships with Esther Bloom (Jazmine Franks), Jen Gilmore (Amy Downham) and Chloe (Susan Loughnane).
- George Smith, portrayed by Steven Roberts, appeared in the serial between 2011 and 2014. George is gay and has a relationship with Vincent Elegba (John Omole). He even slept with Danny Lomax (Stephen Billington).
- Jodie Wilde, portrayed by Montana Manning, appeared in the serial between 2011 and 2012. Jodie is bisexual and introduced for a love triangle involving Texas and Dodger Savage (Danny Mac).
- Jen Gilmore, portrayed by Amy Downham, appeared in the serial between 2012 and 2013. Jen is a lesbian secondary school teacher, who begins a relationship with Tilly Evans (Lucy Dixon), a sixth form student.
- Sienna Blake, portrayed by Anna Passey, has appeared in the serial since 2012. Although initially portrayed as a heterosexual, when Summer Ranger (Rhiannon Clements) admits her romantic feelings for Sienna, they begin an affair behind Brody Hudson's (Adam Woodward) back. After having romances with men, Sienna engages in a relationship with Cleo McQueen (Nadine Mulkerrin).
- Vincent Elegba, portrayed by John Omole, appeared in the serial between 2013 and 2014. Vincent is a closeted gay, who begins a secret relationship with George Smith (Steven Roberts).
- Chloe, portrayed by Susan Loughnane, appeared in the serial between 2013 and 2014. Chloe is bisexual and begins a relationship with Tilly Evans (Lucy Dixon).
- Danny Lomax, portrayed by Stephen Billington, appeared in the serial between 2013 and 2014. Danny is bisexual and despite being married to his wife Sam Lomax (Lizzie Roper), has an affair with John Paul McQueen (James Sutton), as well as George Smith (Steven Roberts).
- Peri Lomax, portrayed by Ruby O'Donnell, appeared in the serial from 2013 to 2025. Peri is perceived as heterosexual until 2018, when she develops feelings for and sleeps with her homeless friend Harley Frater (Mollie Lambert). Peri later begins a relationship with Juliet Nightingale (Niamh Blackshaw) and the two later become engaged.
- Grace Black, portrayed by Tamara Wall, appeared in the serial between 2013 and 2025. Grace is initially perceived as heterosexual, although later engages in sex with Esther Bloom (Jazmine Franks), Kim Butterfield (Daisy Wood-Davis) and Farrah Maalik (Krupa Pattani), later referring to herself as bisexual.
- Ro Hutchinson, portrayed by Ava Webster between 2023 and 2025 and Leo Cole since 2025, has appeared in the serial since 2013. In 2024, Ro comes out as a transgender boy after he was formerly named Rose. He also gets bullied due to his gender identity. Ro was attracted to Kathleen-Angel McQueen (Naledi Rapotu) until his sexuality is revealed when he tried to kiss much older Rex Gallagher (Jonny Labey).
- Blessing Chambers, played by Modupe Adeyeye, appeared in 2014. Blessing is a transgender woman and is married to Dennis Savage (Joe Tracini).
- Kim Butterfield, portrayed by Daisy Wood-Davis, appeared in the serial between 2014 and 2018. Kim is a lesbian, who develops relationships with Grace Black (Tamara Wall) and Esther Bloom (Jazmine Franks), whom she later marries. She later begins a relationship with Farrah Maalik (Krupa Pattani).
- Lockie Campbell, portrayed by Nick Rhys, appeared in the serial between 2014 and 2016. Lockie is bisexual and despite marrying Porsche McQueen (Twinnie-Lee Moore), has sex with her cousin John Paul McQueen (James Sutton).
- Cleo McQueen, portrayed by Nadine Mulkerrin, appeared in the serial from 2015 to 2022, and from 2024 onwards. Initially portrayed as heterosexual, Cleo later begins a serious relationship with Sienna Blake (Anna Passey) and slept with Abigail Matthews (Brooke Vincent).
- Scott Drinkwell, portrayed by Ross Adams, appeared in the serial from 2015 to 2024. Scott is openly gay and is portrayed as camp. He has a relationship with John Paul McQueen (James Sutton) and Levi Rochester (Cerith Flinn), and an affair with Mitchell Deveraux (Imran Adams). Scott has also engaged in drag, under the pseudonym "Anita Tinkle". Scott and Mitchell later marry.
- Sally St. Claire, portrayed by Annie Wallace, appeared in the serial from 2015 to 2024. Sally is a lesbian transgender woman, who is later revealed to be John Paul McQueen's (James Sutton) biological father. She had a relationship with John Paul's mother Myra McQueen (Nicole Barber-Lane).
- James Nightingale, portrayed by Gregory Finnegan, appeared in the serial since 2016. James is a gay lawyer who in the past, paid Harry Thompson (Parry Glasspool), who was a male prostitute, to sleep with him however James and Harry still had a brief on-off relationship before Harry died in 2019. James also entered a relationship with John Paul McQueen (James Sutton). James later slept with Liam Donovan (Jude Monk McGowan) and begins dating Ste Hay (Kieron Richardson) and the two later marry.
- Liam Donovan, has been portrayed by Maxim Baldry from 2016 to 2017, and Jude Monk McGowan from 2018 to 2020. He is initially assumed to be heterosexual, however, after sleeping with James Nightingale (Gregory Finnegan), it is hinted that he has slept with men before, and is quite comfortable with his sexuality.
- Ryan Knight, portrayed by Duncan James, appeared on the serial between 2016 and 2018. He is assumed to be bisexual as he unexpectedly has an affair with Kyle Kelly (Adam Rickitt) while married to his wife Amy Barnes (Ashley Slanina-Davies), and later begins relationships with Ste Hay (Kieron Richardson) and Tegan Lomax (Jessica Ellis).
- Kyle Kelly, portrayed by Adam Rickitt, appeared in the serial from 2017 to 2020. Kyle and has an affair with Ryan Knight (Duncan James) and later begins a relationship with James Nightingale (Gregory Finnegan). It is revealed that Kyle is bisexual as he pursues a relationship with Nancy Osborne (Jessica Fox).
- Farrah Maalik, portrayed by Krupa Pattani, appeared in the serial between 2017 and 2019. Farrah is a lesbian psychiatrist who arrives in the village, only to catch the eye of Esther Bloom (Jazmine Franks). She later begins a relationship with Kim Butterfield (Daisy Wood-Davis), however also kisses Grace Black (Tamara Wall), and begins a relationship with her.
- Harley Frater, portrayed by Mollie Lambert, appeared in the serial between 2018 and 2019. Harley sleeps with Peri Lomax (Ruby O'Donnell) after they spend time together while they are both homeless. They begin a polyamorious relationship, sharing with Tom Cunningham (Ellis Hollins).
- Phoenix Hathaway, portrayed by Tylan Grant, appeared in the serial from 2018 to 2024. Phoenix was formerly a cisgender girl Brooke, until he identifies as non-binary. Phoenix is autistic and is shocked to learn about non-binary identities from Ripley Lennox (Ki Griffin), but feels that he relates to the identity and comes out as non-binary. He later comes out as a transgender man, and changes his name to Phoenix. Pre-transition, Phoenix had relationships with Imran, Ripley and Ollie Morgan (Aedan Duckworth/Gabriel Clark).
- Juliet Nightingale, portrayed by Niamh Blackshaw, appeared in the serial from 2018 to 2023. Juliet initially presents herself as hetereosexual, embarking on a relationship with Sid Sumner (Billy Price) and sleeping with Ollie Morgan (Gabriel Clark). However, she later comes out as a lesbian and has relationships with Peri Lomax (Ruby O'Donnell) and Nadira Valli (Ashling O'Shea).
- Mitchell Deveraux, portrayed by Imran Adams, appeared in the serial from 2019 to 2020. He is a gay man, initially portrayed as heterosexual, and upon his arrival, he begins a relationship with Cleo McQueen (Nadine Mulkerrin). He begins an affair with Scott Drinkwell (Ross Adams), and eventually chooses to be with him instead of Cleo. Scott and Mitchell later get married.
- George Kiss, portrayed by Callum Kerr, appeared in the serial from 2020 to 2021. George is gay, and begins a relationship with John Paul McQueen (James Sutton), which has recently become abusive on George's part as he continues to manipulate and attack John Paul.
- Ripley Lennox, portrayed by Ki Griffin, appeared in the serial from 2020 to 2022. Ripley is non-binary and has a relationship with Phoenix Hathaway (Tylan Grant), who was also formerly non-binary.
- Summer Ranger, portrayed by Rhiannon Clements, appeared in the serial from 2020 to 2021. When Grace Black (Tamara Wall) asks her how many men are interested in her, she responds that she does not only date men, since she believes sexuality is a spectrum. She later develops feelings for Sienna Blake (Anna Passey), and they begin an affair behind Brody Hudson's (Adam Woodward) back.
- Nadira Valli, portrayed by Ashling O'Shea, appeared in the serial from 2022 to 2024. Nadira was previously portrayed as heterosexual until she realises that she likes women after kissing Juliet Nightingale (Niamh Blackshaw).
- Dillon Ray, portrayed by Nathaniel Dass, appeared in the serial from 2023 to 2026. Dillon is pansexual and comes out to his family, and begins dating Lucas Hay (Oscar Curtis). The two have an on-off relationship but Dillon later begins a relationship with Lucas' father, Ste Hay (Kieron Richardson).
- Lacey Lloyd, portrayed by Annabelle Davis, appeared in the soap from 2023 to 2024. Lacey is a lesbian and has a relationship with Nadira Valli (Ashling O'Shea).
- Carter Shepherd, portrayed by David Ames, appeared in the soap from 2023 to 2024. Carter was previously a closeted gay, he has a daughter with his former girlfriend and was a victim of conversion therapy, to which he tries to target John Paul McQueen (James Sutton) and Lucas Hay (Oscar Curtis). Carter also had a sexual affair with John Paul whilst in a relationship with Maxine Minniver (Nikki Sanderson).
- Kitty Draper, portrayed by Iz Hesketh, appeared in the serial in 2024. Kitty is a transgender woman and has romances with Beau Ramsey (Jon-Paul Bell) and Freddie Roscoe (Charlie Clapham). Pre-transition, she had a relationship with and impregnated Lizzie Chen-Williams (Lily Best).
- Rex Gallagher, portrayed by Jonny Labey, has appeared in the serial from 2024 to 2026. Rex is gay and a cross-dresser, and was in a relationship with Ste Hay (Kieron Richardson).
- Jeremy Blake, portrayed by Jeremy Sheffield, appeared in the serial from 2024 to 2025. Jeremy had relationships with both men and women, stating he has no preference with regards to gender, assuming him to be pansexual. He later becomes engaged to John Paul McQueen (James Sutton), but also sleeps with Liberty Savage (Jessamy Stoddart).
- Abigail Matthews, portrayed by Brooke Vincent, has appeared in the serial since 2026. Abigail is a lesbian and has slept with Cleo McQueen (Nadine Mulkerrin).

=== Pobol y Cwm ===
Pobol y Cwm is a Welsh-language television soap opera broadcast by S4C, which has aired since October 1974.

- Iolo White, portrayed by Dyfan Rees, is the village plummer who marries Tyler.
- Yvonne Evans, portrayed by Tonya Smith, is the ex-wife of Gwyneth, around the time they were married she also had a brief relationship with Delyth. In 2024 Yvonne returns to the village to try and tie up some loose ends with her brother, as he thought that she was dead. After spending around a month in the village she leaves with Delyth to start a new life.
- Gwyneth Jones, portrayed by Llinor ap Gwynedd, is bisexual.
- Tyler Davies, portrayed by Aled Llyr Thomas, is a teacher who marries Iolo.
- Maya Cooper, portrayed by Sophie Mensah, moves to the village to live with her partner Delyth (2023). In February 2024, Delyth asks Maya to marry her, to which she says yes (off screen). After a rocky engagement party, Delyth ends things with Maya and leaves the village with Yvonne to escape the police. Maya leaves the village but returns two months later. However she doesn't plan to stick around for long.
- Delyth Fielding, portrayed by Carys Eleri, is the ex-fiancée of Maya, In March 2024 she leaves the village the night of their engagement party with Yvonne to flee the police.
- Sioned Rees, portrayed by Emily Tucker, ends up developing feelings for Maya however this happens when she in a relationship. When her boyfriend DJ discovers that she cheated on him with Maya he flees to Ireland. Sioned sees this as an opportunity to give a relationship a go with Maya but she ends up leaving after DJ returns. Two months later she ends things with DJ as his jealousy of Maya surfaces as she returns to the village. Maya isn't too sure how long she'll stay in the village for and plans to go back to Liverpool again. Just when things seem to be going smoothly, Maya betrays Sioned by considering to take a bribe from her mother to stick around to help her look after twins when their born.

== United States ==
=== All My Children ===
All My Children is an American television soap opera broadcast by the American Broadcasting Company, which aired between January 1970 and September 2011.

- Lynn Carson, portrayed by Donna Pescow, appeared in the serial between 1982 and 1983. Lynn is the show's first homosexual character, although she was never given a love interest.
- Michael Delaney, portrayed by Chris Bruno, appeared in the serial between 1995 and 1997. Michael is a gay high school teacher who eventually came out to his students, leading to his firing.
- Kevin Sheffield, portrayed by Ben Jorgensen, appeared in the serial between 1995 and 1998. Kevin is one of Michael's students who came out after Michael was sacked.
- Brad Phillips, portrayed by Daniel McDonald, appeared in the serial between 1996 and 1997.
- Bianca Montgomery, portrayed by Eden Riegel between 2000 and 2010 and Christina Bennett Lind between 2010 and 2011, is a lesbian. After coming out, Bianca received backlash from her mother. She has relationships with Sarah, Frankie, Maggie (see Bianca Montgomery and Maggie Stone), Lena (see Lena Kundera and Bianca Montgomery,) and Zoe. After Bianca returns in 2008, she marries Reese in 2009 but after their split, she falls in love with Marissa in 2011. The two later start a relationship.
- Sarah Livingston, portrayed by Elizabeth Harnois, appeared as a guest character in the serial in 2000 and 2001. Sarah developed a romantic relationship with Bianca when they were both in rehab for an eating disorder.
- Frankie Stone, portrayed by Elizabeth Hendrickson, appeared in the serial in 2001. Like her twin sister, Maggie, Frankie is either bisexual or a lesbian who has a relationship with Bianca.
- Maggie Stone, portrayed by Hendrickson, appeared in the serial between 2002 and 2005, and a short appearance in 2007. Maggie is probably bisexual and has a close friendship with Bianca, which slowly develops into a relationship after they admit their feelings (see Bianca Montgomery and Maggie Stone).
- Lena Kundera, portrayed by Olga Sosnovska, appeared in the serial between 2003 and 2004. Lena has a romantic relationship with Bianca (see Lena Kundera and Bianca Montgomery).
- Zoe, portrayed by Jeffrey Carlson, appeared in the serial between 2006 and 2007. Zoe, originally called Freddy Luper and Zarf, is a transgender woman who develops an attraction towards Bianca.
- Reese Williams, portrayed by Tamara Braun, appeared in the serial between 2008 and 2009. Reese is the partner of Bianca, who she marries (see Reese Williams and Bianca Montgomery). However, the two later get a divorce.
- Marissa Tasker, portrayed by Sarah Glendening, appeared in the serial between 2009 and 2011. Marissa is originally believed she was straight but later falls in love with, and develops a loving relationship with Bianca.

=== As the World Turns ===
As the World Turns is an American television soap opera broadcast by CBS, which aired between April 1956 and September 2010.

- Hank Eliot, portrayed by Brian Starcher, appeared in the serial between 1988 and 1989. Hank is gay and was set to go through the process of an AIDS diagnosis, before producers decided a different character would instead.
- Luke Snyder, portrayed by Van Hansis, appeared in the serial between 2005 and 2010. Luke came out and developed a crush on his heterosexual friend. He later began a relationship with Noah and afterwards, Reid.
- Noah Mayer, portrayed by Jake Silbermann, appeared in the serial between 2007 and 2010. Noah came out to begin a relationship with Luke.
- Brian Wheatley, portrayed by Laurence Lau, appeared in the serial between 2008 and 2009.
- Reid Oliver, portrayed by Eric Sheffer Stevens, appeared in the serial in 2010. Reid began a relationship with Luke, but later died.

=== Beyond the Gates ===
Beyond the Gates is an American television soap opera broadcast by CBS, which has aired since February 2025.

- Martin Richardson, portrayed by Brandon Claybon, congressman and husband of Bradley Smith.
- Bradley Smith, portrayed by Mike Manning, journalist and husband of Martin Richardson.
- Chelsea Hamilton, portrayed by RhonniRose Mantilla, a social media influencer and cousin of Martin Richardson.
- Madison Montgomery, portrayed by Kenjah McNeil, a neurologist and the girlfriend of Chelsea Hamilton.
- Allison Bailey, portrayed by Brianna Roberts, the ex-wife of Craig and the ex-girlfriend of Chelsea Hamilton.

=== The Bold and the Beautiful ===
The Bold and the Beautiful is an American television soap opera broadcast by CBS, which has aired since March 1987.

- Karen Spencer, portrayed by Joanna Johnson, was originally portrayed as heterosexual until her daughter introduces Karen's long-term partner, Danielle.
- Danielle Spencer, portrayed by Crystal Chappell, is the long-term partner of Karen.
- Maya Avant, portrayed by Karla Mosley, is a transgender woman. Maya marked the first trans female character to feature on a US daytime soap opera as a series regular and the first transgender bride to be married on a US daytime soap opera.
- Deke Sharpe, portrayed by Harrison Cone, is the son of Deacon Sharpe who returns to Los Angeles in 2025 after years away off-screen. It is revealed that Deke is openly gay and has been dating Remy Pryce.
- Remy Pryce, portrayed by Christian Weissmann, is the former best friend of Electra Forrester who arrived in Los Angeles in late 2024. It is revealed that Remy had produced deep-fake pornographic images of Electra as a way to alienate and bully her and for him to be her only friend she would have. Months later it is revealed that Remy has been dating Deke Sharpe, the recently returned son of Deacon Sharpe.

=== Dante's Cove ===
Dante's Cove is an American LGBT-oriented supernatural soap opera broadcast by here!, which aired between October 2005 and December 2007.

- Ambrosius "Bro" Vallin, portrayed by William Gregory Lee.
- Kevin Archer, portrayed by Gregory Michael.
- Toby Moraitis, portrayed by Charlie David.
- Van, portrayed by Nadine Heimann.
- Cory Dalmass, portrayed by Josh Berresford.
- Amber, portrayed by Zara Taylor.
- Tina, portrayed by Rena Riffel.
- Adam, portrayed by Stephen Amell and Jon Fleming.
- Diana Childs, portrayed by Thea Gill.
- Michelle, portrayed by Erin Cummings and Jill Bennett, is lesbian.
- Marco Laveau, portrayed by Gabriel Romero.
- Brit, portrayed by Michelle Wolff, is lesbian.
- Kai, portrayed by German Santiago.
- Griff, portrayed by Jensen Atwood, is bisexual.
- Elena, portrayed by Jenny Shimizu, is lesbian.
- Trevor, portrayed by Reichen Lehmkuhl.

=== Days of Our Lives ===
Days of Our Lives is an American daytime soap opera broadcast by NBC, which has aired since November 1965.

- Sharon Duval revealed in 1977 that she was bisexual and in love with Julie Olson Williams.
- Andrew Donovan first appeared in 1986. In 2022, upon the character's return in the spinoff Beyond Salem (played by Colton Little), he is revealed to be openly gay and later begins a relationship with Paul Narita.
- Will Horton is one of the show's legacy characters who was "born onscreen" (in 1995) and "grew up in front of the audience". He is kind-hearted, and yet audacious. He comes out as gay in 2012, when portrayed by Chandler Massey; and he marries Sonny in 2014 when portrayed by Guy Wilson. Will has a daughter, Arianna Horton, with his friend and ex-girlfriend Gabi Hernandez. Gabi, Will and Sonny all raise Arianna. Will is killed off in 2015, and is resurrected in 2017 (with Massey) after major viewer backlash. In 2015, Will gets into a love triangle with Sonny and his ex, Paul Narita. Will's relationship with Sonny is known to fans as "WilSon", and his relationship with Paul as "Horita".
- Craig Wesley, played by Kevin Spirtas, appeared on-off between 1997 and 2022. He is portrayed as heterosexual for most of his duration, being married to a woman, but he comes out as gay in 2022 and begins a relationship with Leo Stark.
- Harold Wentworth, portrayed by Ryan Scott from 2001 to 2003, was Days first openly gay character. He is a flamboyant fashionista, who, according to Scott, is "about being honest with everyone; anything less is not living". Harold is involved in a storyline with Jack Deveraux, where Jack pretends to be gay in a crazy plot to win back his ex-wife.
- Sonny Kiriakis, portrayed by Freddie Smith, first appeared in the serial in 2011. He is an open-minded, confident, proudly-out gay man. Sonny has relationships with Will Horton (whom he marries), Brian, Paul Narita, Leo Stark and Evan Frears. His wedding with Will in April 2014, was the first male-male gay wedding in US daytime drama. He helps raise Will's daughter, Arianna, and is effectively a father to her. See also: Will Horton and Sonny Kiriakis.
- Neil Hultgren, played by Jesse Kristofferson, is a gay friend of Sonny and Will, who is kissed by Will in the show's "first gay kiss", in February 2012.
- Javi Hernandez, portrayed by Al Calderon, is openly gay, the love interest and the boyfriend of Leo Stark.
- Evan Frears, portrayed by Brock Kelly, is bisexual, the ex-boyfriend of Sonny Kiriakis and Jordan Ridgeway.
- Kerry Youmans, portrayed by Derek Yates, is the ex-boyfriend of Javi Hernandez, who kissed by Leo Stark and was involved with him.
- Dimitri Von Leuschner, portrayed by Peter Porte, is the ex-boyfriend of Leo Stark and the ex-husband of Gwen Rizczech.
- Brian, portrayed by Brant Daugherty, appears in the serial in 2012 and 2013. He is keen on Sonny, and briefly dates him when Sonny and Will are on a break.
- Jensen, portrayed by Derek Magyar, is an ex-convict who sexually assaults Will's cousin, Nick Fallon, when they are cellmates in prison. It is implied that this is the cause of Nick's homophobia.
- Brent is an old friend of Sonny's from his adventuring days, who comes to town when Sonny is living with Will, Gabi and Arianna, and tries to lure Sonny away from their family life together.
- Paul Narita, portrayed by Christopher Sean, is initially a professional baseball player, who comes to town in 2014 for surgery. Will is assigned to interview him. Paul is gay and comes onto Will, and they end up having sex. Both are unaware that they both know Sonny – Will being married to him, and Paul being Sonny's "first love". After Will is believed to be killed, Paul and Sonny re-unite, and are set to marry – but news of Will being alive stops the wedding, and Sonny dumps Paul for Will. But Will has amnesia and does not remember Sonny. Instead Will is attracted to Paul, and they fall in love and become a couple.
- Derrick, portrayed by Spencer Neville, is a hotel bellhop who flirts with and dates Paul.
- Leo Stark, portrayed by Greg Rikaart, began appearing in 2018. He dates Sonny after Will and Sonny's divorce, but is actually being paid to date him by Sonny's business rival Vivian Alamain.

=== Dynasty ===
Dynasty is an American prime time television soap opera broadcast by the American Broadcasting Company, which aired between January 1981 and May 1989. The show was rebooted in 2017 on The CW.

- Steven Carrington, portrayed by Al Corley and Jack Coleman in the original series, is initially portrayed as bisexual. He has many relationships with women and some relationships with men, however, he later comes out as gay. In the 2017 reboot, Steven is portrayed by James Mackay, and is openly gay from the beginning.
- Sam Jones, portrayed by Rafael de la Fuente, is a character from the 2017 rebooted series and Steven's husband. He is a male version of Sammy Jo Carrington from the original series.
- Ted Dinard, portrayed by Mark Withers in the original series, is Steven's former boyfriend who is accidentally killed by Steven's father, Blake Carrington. Michael Patrick Lane plays an altered version of Steven's ex-boyfriend Ted Dinard in the rebooted series.
- Chris Deegan, portrayed by Grant Goodeve in the original series, is a gay lawyer friend of Steven's whom Blake mistakes as his son's lover.
- Luke Fuller, portrayed by Billy Campbell in the original series, is Steven's coworker with whom he falls in love despite being married to Claudia.
- Bart Fallmont, portrayed by Kevin Conroy in the original series and Cameron Watson in the 1991 reunion miniseries, is a lawyer who spars with both Steven and his brother Adam Carrington (Gordon Thomson). Steven and Bart find that they are attracted to each other, while Adam blackmails Bart under threat of publicly revealing his homosexuality. Bart refuses to cooperate, Adam reveals his secret, and Bart leaves town. Years later in Dynasty: The Reunion, Steven and Bart are in a committed relationship in Washington, D.C.

=== General Hospital ===
General Hospital is the longest-running American soap opera in production, premiering in 1963. It is also the second longest-running drama in television in American history after Guiding Light.

- Ted Murty, portrayed by Patrick Fabian, was Liz's teacher in high school. After she got raped by an unknown assailant, she suspected Mr. Murty based on the smell of his cologne. She and Lucky broke into Murty's house to get proof when he appeared with a man named Richard, and Lucky realized that the two are a couple.
- Lucas Jones, currently portrayed by Van Hansis, was born on the show in 1989 and grew up onscreen (played by various actors), and he came out as gay in 2005 (then played by Ben Hogestyn). He was written out of the show in 2006, but returned in 2014 (then played by Ryan Carnes). He dated and eventually married Brad Cooper.
- Felix DuBois, portrayed by Marc Anthony Samuel, is a gay nurse who debuted in 2012, and dated Brad Cooper.
- Brad Cooper, portrayed by Parry Shen, began as a villainous character in 2013, and eventually dated both Felix DuBois and Lucas Jones, eventually marrying Jones. He identifies as gay.
- Kristina Corinthos Davis, currently played by Kate Mansi, first appeared in 2002, and came out in 2015 (then played by Lexi Ainsworth) after developing feelings for her female professor, Parker. Kristina dates both men and women.
- Parker Forsyth, played by Ashley Jones appeared between 2016 and 2017. She is a lesbian professor who is married to a woman and later dates Kristina.
- Dr. Terry Randolph, played by transgender actress Cassandra James, is a transgender physician. She is Elizabeth Webber's childhood friend and was her first kiss. She is a pediatric oncologist.
- Marco Rios, played by Adrian Anchondo is a gay lawyer, He is the love interest and the boyfriend of Lucas Jones after Brad left town for a fresh start.

=== Guiding Light ===
Guiding Light (also known as The Guiding Light) is an American television soap opera broadcast by NBC Radio, followed by CBS Radio and then CBS Television, which aired between January 1937 and September 2009.

- Olivia Spencer, portrayed by Crystal Chappell, appeared in the serial between 1999 and 2009. Olivia has a relationship with Natalia.
- Natalia Rivera, portrayed by Jessica Leccia, appeared in the serial between 2007 and 2009. Natalia has a relationship with Olivia.
- Doris Wolfe, portrayed by Orlagh Cassidy, appeared in the serial between 1999 and 2009. Doris is revealed to be a lesbian when she gets involved in the storyline between Oliva and Natalia. She is the town's Mayor and because of that is in the closet. She has a daughter Ashlee (via insemination) and only comes out to her because they have fallen apart because Ashlee feels like she doen't know anything about her mum. This happens just in the final weeks of the show.
- Jemanda Weeks, portrayed by Jo Newman, appeared in the serial on-and-off between 2003 and 2009. She is Doris' secret girlfriend. Though being in multiple episodes, she was only referred to as a Bartender until Doris introduced Jemanda to her daughter Ashlee and others at the end of the serial.

=== The Haves and the Have Nots ===
The Haves and the Have Nots is an American prime time television soap opera created, executive produced, written, and directed by Tyler Perry. It began airing on the Oprah Winfrey Network from 28 May 2013.

- Jeffery Harrington, portrayed by Gavin Houston, is a drug counselor who is originally closeted until he is entrapped by his client, Wyatt Cryer (Aaron O'Connell), who he comes out to.
- Justin Lewis, portrayed by Nicholas James, a closeted cop that Jeffrey develops a sexual relationship with. The relationship soon becomes obsessive and abusive on Justin's part and begins to stalk Jeffery once he is rejected.

=== Melrose Place ===
Melrose Place is an American primetime soap opera broadcast by Fox, which aired between July 1992 and May 1999. The show never featured any LGBT characters in sexual scenes, with the scene featuring Matt kissing another man cut.

- Matt Fielding, portrayed by Doug Savant.
- Dr. Dan Hathaway, portrayed by Greg Evigan, is a rehab director who enters into a relationship with Matt when he goes into treatment for his drug addiction. Dr. Hathaway also becomes physically abusive to Matt.
- Dave Erickson, portrayed by Rob Youngblood, replaced Matt as a social worker at Wilshire Memorial. He had a one-night stand with Matt and revealed it to Matt's boyfriend Alan Ross.
- Dr. Paul Graham, portrayed by David Beecroft, is a married doctor at Wilshire Memorial who enters into a "down low" affair with Matt and sets the latter up for his wife's murder. Dr. Graham confesses to his wife's murder as he dies in Matt's arms and in front of the police.
- Jeffrey Lindley, portrayed by Jason Beghe, is a closeted Marines lieutenant who has a relationship with Matt while Matt is married to Katya Petrova (whom he marries to help her get a green card). Matt and Jeffrey break up when Jeffrey reveals he's HIV-positive and decides he and Matt are better off friends.
- Alan Ross, portrayed by Lonnie Schuyler, is a closeted soap opera actor who marries a lesbian co-star (Valerie Madison) to cover up the fact that he's gay and in a relationship with Matt.

=== One Life to Live ===
One Life to Live is an American soap opera broadcast by the American Broadcasting Company, which aired between July 1968 and January 2012.

- Billy Douglas, portrayed by Ryan Phillippe, appeared in the serial between 1992 and 1994.
- Daniel Colson, portrayed by Mark Dobies, is a lawyer who married a woman. He had an affair with a male college student and murdered two people to keep his secret hidden.
- Mark Solomon, portrayed by Matt Cavanaugh, appeared in the serial between 2004 and 2005.
- Kyle Lewis, portrayed by Brett Claywell, appeared in the serial between 2009 and 2010. Kyle is a lab tech who had a relationship with Oliver in college, but is rejected when Oliver insists he is heterosexual. Kyle starts a relationship with Nick, but reunites with Oliver after he comes out.
- Oliver Fish, portrayed by Scott Evans, appeared in the serial between 2009 and 2010. Oliver is a police officer who had a relationship with Kyle in college. He is a closeted homosexual who reunites with Kyle after coming out.
- Nick Chavez, portrayed by Nicholas Rodriguez, appeared in the serial between 2009 and 2010. Nick begins a relationship with Kyle, which ends when he decides to reunite with his ex-partner.

=== Passions ===
Passions is an American television soap opera broadcast by NBC between July 1999 and September 2007, and The 101 Network from September 2007 until August 2008.

- Chad Harris, portrayed by Charles Divins, is originally perceived as heterosexual, although it later transpires that he is either bisexual or homosexual, which he resents himself for.
- Simone Russell, portrayed by Cathy Doe, is a lesbian who came out in 2005 and enters a relationship with Rae.
- Rae Thomas, portrayed by Jossara Jinario, is a lesbian who enters a relationship with Simone.
- Vincent Clarkson, also known as Valerie Clarkson, portrayed by Daphnée Duplaix and Phillip Jeanmarie, is intersex.

=== Santa Barbara ===
Santa Barbara is an American television soap opera broadcast by NBC, which aired between July 1984 and January 1993.

- Channing Capwell Jr., portrayed by Robert Brian Wilson, is bisexual. During his relationship with a woman, Channing maintained a relationship with Lindsay, a man with whom he appeared to be in love.
- Lindsay Smith, portrayed by Joel Bailey, has a relationship with Channing, despite him being in a relationship.

=== El Señor de los Cielos ===
El Señor de los Cielos is an American telenovela broadcast by Telemundo, which has aired since 15 April 2013.

- Esperanza Salvatierra, portrayed by Sabrina Seara, is a young bisexual and leads a relationship of "friends with rights" with Aurelio Casillas.
- Omar Terán, portrayed by Jesús Moré, he is the president of Mexico. Omar is a womanizing man. But his biggest secret is that he is bisexual.
- Jaime Ernesto Rosales, portrayed by Alan Slim, he is Omar's partner. He becomes Omar's lover, after he reveals his secret.

=== The Young and the Restless ===
The Young and the Restless is an American television soap opera broadcast by CBS, which has aired since March 1973.

- Katherine Chancellor, portrayed by Jeanne Cooper, has a crush on Joann. She starts lavishing her with gifts, but when Joann realises this, she ends their friendship.
- Joann Curtis, portrayed by Kay Heberle, is the recipient of Katherine's crush. When Joann realises this, she ends their friendship.
- Phillip Chancellor III, portrayed by Thom Bierdz, came out during his 2009 return.
- Rafe Torres, portrayed by Yani Gellman, is openly gay.
- Mariah Copeland, portrayed by Camryn Grimes, explored her bisexuality after best friend Tessa comforted her.
- Tessa Porter, portrayed by Cait Fairbanks, revealed her attraction to her friend Mariah though she was dating Mariah's brother Noah.

== See also ==
- List of LGBT characters in television and radio
- List of animated series with LGBTQ+ characters
- List of BL dramas
- List of comedy-drama television series
- List of dramatic television series with LGBT characters: 1970s–2000s
- List of dramatic television series with LGBT characters: 2010s
- List of dramatic television series with LGBT characters: 2020s
- List of made-for-television films with LGBT characters
- List of comedy and variety television programs with LGBT cast members
- List of reality television programs with LGBT cast members
- List of news and information television programs featuring LGBTQ+ subjects
- Television works about intersex
- List of television series with bisexual characters
- List of fictional bisexual characters
- List of fictional lesbian characters
- List of fictional asexual characters
- List of fictional non-binary characters
- List of fictional pansexual characters
