= Jarmo (given name) =

Male given name

Jarmo is a Finnish and Estonian masculine given name. Notable people with the name include:

- Jarmo Ahjupera (born 1984), Estonian football player
- Jarmo Alatensiö (1963–2003), football player
- Jarmo Hakala (born 1954), Olympic canoer
- Jarmo Hyttinen, actor
- Jarmo Jokila (born 1986), ice hockey player
- Jarmo Kekäläinen (born 1966), ice hockey player
- Jarmo Koski (born 1951), actor
- Jarmo Kytölehto (born 1961), rally driver
- Jarmo Kärnä (born 1958), long jumper
- Jarmo Lampela (born 1964), film director
- Jarmo Lehtinen (born 1969), rally co-driver
- Jarmo Lehtinen, sports commentator
- Jarmo Manninen (born 1951), football player
- Jarmo Matikainen (born 1960), football manager
- Jarmo Myllys (born 1965), ice hockey goaltender
- Jarmo Mäkinen (born 1958), actor
- Jarmo Puolakanaho, guitar player
- Jarmo Saastamoinen (born 1967), football player
- Jarmo Sandelin (born 1967), Swedish-Finn professional golfer
- Jarmo Savolainen (1961–2009), jazz pianist
- Jarmo Valtonen (born 1982), speed skater
- Jarmo Wasama (1943–1966), ice hockey player
- Jarmo Övermark (born 1955), Olympic wrestler
