= Nightmare 2: The Nightmare Continues =

- Original Finnish film poster
- Finnish: Nightmare 2 – painajainen jatkuu
- Directed by: Marko Äijö
- Written by: Tiina Tanskanen; Teemu Salonen
- Produced by: Rea Stephany
- Starring: Sara Parikka; Mikko Parikka; Tero Tiittanen; Tommi Taurula; Hemmo Karja
- Cinematography: Taksu Takkunen
- Edited by: Jyrki Keränen
- Music by: Karl Sinkkonen
- Production company: FremantleMedia Finland
- Distributed by: SF Film Finland
- Release date: 3 December 2014 (Finland)
- Running time: 77 minutes
- Country: Finland
- Language: Finnish
- Budget: €591.000
- Box office: $855,759

Nightmare 2: The Nightmare Continues (Finnish: Nightmare 2 – painajainen jatkuu) is a 2014 Finnish horror thriller film directed by Marko Äijö. Like its predecessor, the film is based on Finnish soap opera television series Salatut elämät.

Filming of the film began in May 2014 and lasted until Midsummer. Filming lasted a total of four weeks, one week of which was filmed at the Tervaniemi Manor area in Tervakoski, Kanta-Häme. The film's final production budget was €591,000, of which the Finnish Film Foundation's share was €290,000. The film's distribution company SF Film received €80,000 in marketing and distribution support from the Finnish Film Foundation.

Like its predecessor, the film was poorly received by critics. Many gave the film only one star, but Aki Lehti from former Dome.fi site went even further without giving any stars, describing watching the film as "pure torture" and that the film "drowns its actors and audience in shit."

== Plot ==
Jiri (Mikko Parikka) has established a summer bar on a holiday resort island, where he invites his friends, including Peppi (Sara Parikka), to spend the weekend. The horrors that happened earlier on the wedding cruise come back to haunt Peppi's mind when it turns out that Sampo Kaukovaara's sister Aino (Jasmin Voutilainen) is working for the summer in a local cottage village. In addition, with the strange things happening on the island, Peppi realizes that the nightmare is not over yet.

== Cast ==
- Sara Parikka as Peppi Kuula
- Mikko Parikka as Jiri Viitamäki
- Tero Tiittanen as Sergei Kuula
- Tommi Taurula as Kari Taalasmaa
- Hemmo Karja as Janne Haukkala
- Emil Hallberg as Tale Taalasmaa
- Patrik Borodavkin as Miro Holm
- Sara Lohiniva as Oona Kiviranta
- Jasmin Voutilainen as Aino Kaukovaara
- Jarmo Hyttinen as Eino
- Karoliina Blackburn as Tessa Nylund

== See also ==
- List of Finnish films of the 2010s
- Salatut elämät
