= Luostarinen =

Luostarinen is a Finnish surname. Notable people with the surname include:

- Alpo Luostarinen (1886–1948), Finnish farmer and politician
- Eetu Luostarinen (born 1998), Finnish ice hockey player
- Esko Luostarinen (born 1935), professional ice hockey player
- Päivi Luostarinen (born 1955), Finnish diplomat
- Reijo Luostarinen (1939–2017) Finnish organisational theorist
- Leena Luostarinen (1949–2013), Finnish painter
- Sanna Luostarinen (born 1976), Finnish actress
