= Salatut elämät =

1999 Finnish TV soap opera

- Logo used from 2014 to early 2019
- Also known as: Salkkarit
- Genre: Soap opera Drama
- Created by: Jason Daniel; Anne Harris; Greg Stevens
- Starring: Full list
- Opening theme: "Tunteisiin"
- Composers: Vesa Mäkinen (1999–2014); Epidemic Sound (2014–present); Universal Publishing Production Music (2017–2023, 2025–present)
- Country of origin: Finland
- Original language: Finnish
- No. of seasons: 29
- No. of episodes: 5,100

Production
- Executive producers: Eerika Vermilä; Marika Makaroff; Sarita Harma
- Producers: Marko Äijö; Aku Louhimäki
- Production locations: Fremantle studio, Konala, Helsinki, Finland
- Camera setup: Multi-camera
- Running time: 21 minutes (without adverts)
- Production company: Fremantle Finland

Original release
- Network: MTV3; MTV Sub (reruns); MTV Ava (reruns)
- Release: 25 January 1999 – present

Salatut elämät (English: Secret Lives, lit. 'Concealed Lives') is a Finnish television soap opera that premiered on MTV3 on 25 January 1999. The series' storylines follow the daily lives of several families who live in the same apartment block, Pihlajakatu 23 B in Helsinki. The series primarily centres on residents of Pihlajakatu and its neighbouring areas. Only four of the original twenty characters – Ismo (Esko Kovero), Kalle (Pete Lattu), Aki (Sami Uotila) and Kari (Tommi Taurula) – still remain in the series, and most of the series' current characters have made their debuts in 2004 or later. Ismo is the only character who has never left the series.

During the series' 27-year run, over 5,000 episodes have been aired, making it the longest running drama in television in the Nordics. On 12 June 2017, it was announced that Salatut elämät will be on the air until the summer of 2023, making the series the longest-lasting drama series of all time in Finland. It was later stated that the series would continue airing after 2023.

MTV3 also airs reruns of the series every weekend (Monday–Wednesday episodes on Saturday, Thursday–Friday episodes on Sunday). In the summer, the channel airs reruns of the series; in the summer of 2014, episodes from the season 2009–2010 were aired.

== Starting position of the series ==
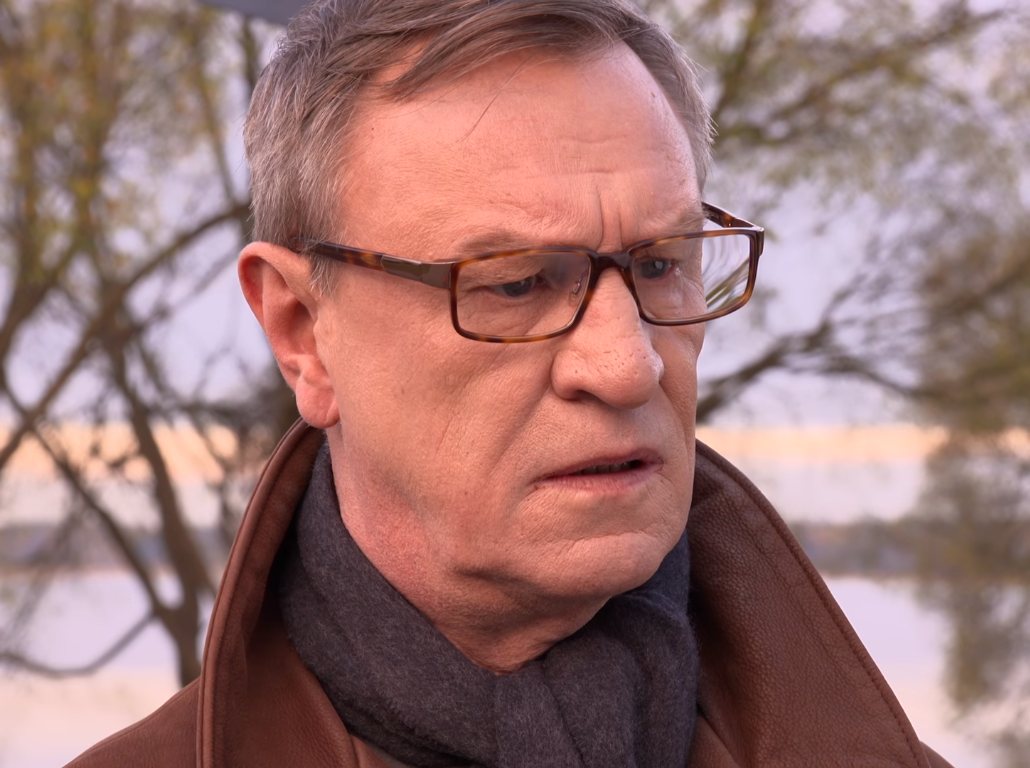
Ismo Laitela is the person who has been involved in the series the longest.

At the beginning of the series, at the request of a janitor Seppo Taalasmaa (Jarmo Koski) and his wife Ulla (Maija-Liisa Peuhu), the police have come to investigate why Tyyne Puustinen does not open the door. She is found dead in her apartment and police begin investigating the cause of death (later revealed to be murder by her grandson, Tero Puustinen). The couple later tells their daughter Elina Taalasmaa (Sanna Luostarinen) about Puustinen's death.

Aki Nikkinen (Sami Uotila) and Markus Ekholm (Andrei Sandberg) have been looking for a suitable retail space for their café for a long time and eventually find a suitable one. Katja Vainio (Anu Koskinen) promises to be an interior designer. Katja's sister and roommate Jenni (Anu Palevaara) has brought a gentleman Toni Veijalainen (Kristo Salminen) to her home. Jenni receives a letter stating that she has been expelled from school due to continued absences. At the same time, the subsidies also run out, so Jenni asks Toni to be their subtenant.

Jukka Salin (Jouko Keskinen) and his new wife Hanna (Tarja Omenainen) return home from the Canary Islands. At home, they are received by Aleksi (Tuomas Kytömäki), who has just left the army, the middle child of the family Saku (Jasper Pääkkönen) and the family pit Silja (Jonna Keskinen). Hanna and Jukka reveal to the children that they got married during the trip. Saku and Aleksi are happy about Hanna's move to them, but Silja does not take the news well, and it does not help that Silja hears that Aleksi knew about their marriage intentions.

Next door to Salin family lives Ismo Laitela (Esko Kovero), who is (believed to be) a widow with two teenage children, Miia (Venla Saartamo) and Kalle (Pete Lattu). Ismo works as a retailer in a kiosk-like shop called Ismon Valinta ("Ismo's Choice"). Lawyer Laura Kiviranta (Piitu Uski) lives alone as a sworn single.

== Themes ==
The series has dealt with a wider range of subjects such as abortion, drug abuse, alcoholism, homosexuality, incest, animal rights, rape, religious fanaticism, gambling addiction, teenage pregnancy, domestic violence, cancer, eating disorder, school bullying, narcissistic personality disorder and its effects to the family, the search of biological parents, stealing and racism; many episodes involving these themes have caused public debate.

An exceptionally widespread controversy was started by the season finale aired on 1 June 2009. In the episode, a pregnant woman, Paula Sievinen (Johanna Nurmimaa), was seemingly buried alive and a café Kentauri exploded during a wedding celebration, which implied death of many main characters. Many, including Finland's Minister of Communications Suvi Lindén, questioned the show's suitability for school children. FICORA (Finnish Communications Regulatory Authority) decided later that the episode was not suitable for children under the age of 11, but the show's programming slot was late enough to meet the regulations. In 2013, the original main character Jenni Vainio played by Anu Palevaara, was shot on front of the main house, which caused a lot of talk among the fans of the series. Jenni left the series after a 14-year presence. However, producer Marko Äijö said that the biggest sensation of the series was in the early days, when Kalle Laitela, played by Pete Lattu, kissed another man. At that time, the channel MTV3 received over 40 meters of fax about the kiss.

During the series' entire run in Finland, a 30-minute episode has aired every weekday in an early-evening slot at 7:30 pm. A new season usually premieres in either late August or early September and concludes by the beginning of June. Normally, the series is on a hiatus during the Christmas holidays, approximately 3 or 4 weeks. The series' episodes are also available online at the official website for 30 days after their original airing.

== Settings ==
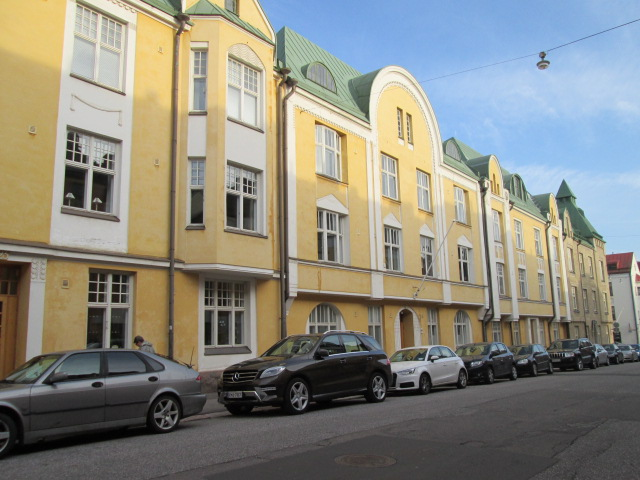
The original Pihlajakatu was on Huvilakatu.

Salatut elämät's main focus is the fictional street Pihlajakatu ("Rowan Street"), located in Ullanlinna, Helsinki. Other locations include a high school, a hospital, Café Moose and an inn, Amanda, which contains a hotel and a restaurant. It had also a day spa from 2009 to 2014, and a gym from 2010 to 2017. Former "main café" was Kentauri which, however, exploded due to a gas leak during a wedding celebration in the season 11 finale.

All of the houses and other locations featured in the show are filmed at the FremantleMedia studio in Konala, Helsinki. In real life, Pihlajakatu is Huvilakatu, which is located in Ullanlinna, Helsinki. Salatut elämät has also filmed scenes in Tampere and in Lapland. A few episodes have also been filmed in the Canary Islands, Lithuania, London and Copenhagen.

== Theme song ==
The original theme song was "Tunteisiin" that was performed by Anna Hanski but in 2001, the theme was changed to a version performed by Jore Marjaranta. In 2004, the theme song was replaced by an electronic version of the theme music. In 2014, the theme song was switched back to the original one, first heard in 1999. In 2019, the series got completely new theme song again.

== Spins-offs ==
Eight web spin-off series have been made; Romeo & Rafael Desperados in 2008, Lillukanvarsia in 2010–2011, Tuuliranta in 2011–2012, Young Man Cash Man in 2013, Young Girl, Dream Girl in 2014, Satula in 2015, Bikineitä ja timantteja (or in English known as Bikinis and Diamonds) in 2016 and Pihlajakadun tuhmat tädit in 2016–2017.

On 5 December 2012, the first Salatut elämät movie was released. The teen thriller movie Nightmare (Nightmare – Painajainen merellä) was one of the most watched Finnish films of 2012. The film was directed by Marko Äijö and the main characters are Peppi (Sara Säkkinen), Heidi (Venla Savikuja), Jiri (Mikko Parikka), Joonatan (Markku Pulli), Miro (Patrik Borodavkin), Oona (Sara Lohiniva) and Sampo (Sampsa Tuomala). Nightmare also won the Jussi Award in the category Public Favorite. A second film, Nightmare 2, was released in December 2014.

== LGBT storylines and fan popularity ==
The show's romantic storyline between Lari (Ronny Röslöf) and Elias (Petteri Paavola), nicknamed "Larias", initially proved very popular on YouTube. A fan account featured clips of the two gay characters. The production company decided not to intervene because they saw it as good publicity.

Another LGBT couple Mira Jokinen & Viola Helenius (now having Viola's grandmothers maiden name, Angervuo as their surname) have also become popular on YouTube. "Miola" became a phenomenon abroad after a Finnish fan started uploading their story with English subtitles on Youtube series. Mira and Viola even got married, being the first same-sex couple to be married in a Finnish soap.

== Television ratings ==
Since its first episode aired in January 1999, it has been one of the most popular TV shows in Finland, regularly attracting around a million viewers (1/5 of Finland's population). At the moment Salatut elämät is the highest-rated drama series in Finland, although its viewership has declined during the past few years.

Season	Episodes	Timeslot	Season premiere	Season finale	TV season	Most-watched episode (million viewers)
1	90	Weekdays 7:30 p.m.	25 January 1999	3 June 1999	1999	1.191
2	170	Weekdays 7:30 p.m.	30 August 1999	10 May 2000	1999–2000	1.216
3	180	Weekdays 7:30 p.m.	4 September 2000	14 May 2001	2000–2001	1.360
4	170	Weekdays 7:30 p.m.	20 August 2001	3 May 2002	2001–2002	1.308
5	165	Weekdays 7:30 p.m.	2 September 2002	16 May 2003	2002–2003	1.294
6	160	Weekdays 7:30 p.m.	1 September 2003	6 May 2004	2003–2004	1.150
7	150	Weekdays 7:30 p.m.	6 September 2004	27 April 2005	2004–2005	1.226
8	150	Weekdays 7:30 p.m. (autumn 2005) Mondays–Thursdays 7:30 p.m. (spring 2006)	30 August 2005	29 May 2006	2005–2006	1.160
9	150	Mondays–Thursdays 7:30 p.m.	14 August 2006	24 May 2007	2006–2007	1.105
10	190	Weekdays 7:30 p.m.	20 August 2007	4 June 2008	2007–2008	1.033
11	190	Weekdays 7:30 p.m.	18 August 2008	1 June 2009	2008–2009	1.043
12	180	Weekdays 7:30 p.m.	24 August 2009	31 May 2010	2009–2010	1.063
13	180	Weekdays 7:30 p.m.	30 August 2010	27 May 2011	2010–2011	0.937
14	180	Weekdays 7:30 p.m.	29 August 2011	8 June 2012	2011–2012	0.970
15	180	Weekdays 7:30 p.m.	3 September 2012	13 June 2013	2012–2013	0.958
16	170	Weekdays 7:30 p.m.	9 September 2013	12 June 2014	2013–2014	0.896
17	185	Weekdays 7:30 p.m.	25 August 2014	11 June 2015	2014–2015	0.813
18	180	Weekdays 7:30 p.m.	31 August 2015	15 June 2016	2015–2016	0.783
19	188	Weekdays 7:30 p.m.	16 August 2016	13 June 2017	2016–2017	0.748
20	189	Weekdays 7:30 p.m.	21 August 2017	13 June 2018	2017–2018	0.709
21	189	Weekdays 7:30 p.m.	20 August 2018	19 June 2019	2018–2019	0.662
22	209	Weekdays 7:30 p.m.	19 August 2019	23 June 2020	2019–2020	0.646
23	219	Weekdays 7:30 p.m.	3 August 2020	29 June 2021	2020–2021	0.540
24	219	Weekdays 7:30 p.m.	23 August 2021	22 June 2022	2021–2022	0.506
25	199	Weekdays 7:30 p.m.	8 August 2022	22 June 2023	2022–2023	0.519
26	173	Weekdays 7:30 p.m.	7 August 2023	25 June 2024	2023–2024	0.546
27	180	Weekdays 7:30 p.m.	12 August 2024	4 July 2025	2024–2025	0.474
28	180	Weekdays 7:30 p.m.	11 August 2025	3 July 2026	2025–2026	0.481
29		Weekdays 7:30 p.m.	10 August 2026		2026–2027	

== Present cast and characters ==
=== Regular cast members ===
Actor	Character	Duration
Esko Kovero	Ismo Laitela	1999–present
Pete Lattu	Kalle Laitela	1999–2002, 2012–present
Sami Uotila	Aki Nikkinen	1999–2002, 2014–present
Tommi Taurula	Kari Taalasmaa (#1)	1999, 2001–2005, 2007–2010, 2014–present
Sannamaija Pekkarinen	Heli Sievinen	2004–2007, 2009–2011, 2012, 2014, 2015, 2026–
Timo Jurkka	Lasse Sievinen	2004–2015, 2019–present
Teemu Lehtilä	Aaro Vaalanne	2004–2007, 2009, 2012, 2015, 2017–present
Hanna Kinnunen	Salla Taalasmaa (née Mattila)	2006–2010, 2019–present
Sampsa Tuomala	Sampo Kaukovaara	2008–2010, 2020–present
Mikko Parikka	Jiri Viitamäki	2010–2020, 2024–
Pinja Kanon	Iida Mustonen (#2)	2016, 2017, 2018, 2019, 2020
Maarit Poussa	Jutta Korhonen	2014, 2016, 2017–present
Oona Kare	Marianna Kurki	2013–2017, 2023–present
Monika Lindeman	Linda Eerikäinen	2015–present
Johanna Puhakka	Alissa Nikkinen	2015–2019, 2026–present
Inkeri Mertanen	Dahlia Mustavaara	2016–present
Raimo Grönberg	Gunnar Mustavaara (#2)	2017–2024, 2025–present
Jarkko Miettinen	Noel Axelsson	2018–present
Sofia Lehtinen	Laila Kajander	2020–present
Johanna Anttila	Joanna Lumijoki	2021–2024, 2025–present
Tuure Taskinen	Henrik Ekholm	2021–present
Axel Milliam	Kristian Harju	2021–present
Lenita Susi	Daniela Axelsson (née Honkanen)	2021–present
Sami Sowe	Olli Oksa	2023–present
Inka Ylönen	Kerttu Mäkeläinen	2024–present
Marko Nurmi	Tatu Väre	2025–present
Eveline Tainio	Jenna Haarla	2026–present
Elias Önlen	Aslan Nummi	2026–present
Lumo Levy	Kaspian Nummi	2026–present
Linda Nurmi	Maija Aro (#2)	2026–present
Teemu Lehtilä	Iiro Hansen	2026–present

=== Recurring cast members ===
Actor	Character	Duration
Anna Rimpelä	Tiina Rajala	2011, 2012, 2013, 2018, 2019, 2020, 2022, 2025–present
Roope Malkki	Tukku Taalasmaa	2023–present
Samuli Ainasvuori	Melvin Malbäck	2025–
Minna Koskela	Iisa Havu	2025–present
Lenni Jyllinmaa	Hugo Väre	2025–present
Luka Töyrä	Paavo "Väyrynen" Luhtinen	2025–present
Nelli Kariniemi	Sandra Axelsson	2026–present
Joa Dahlman	Julius Axelsson	2026–present
Henrikki Virolainen	Johannes Hansen	2026–present
Eeva Litmanen	Hilja Lilja	2026–present

=== Notes ===
- Kari Taalasmaa was played by Henri Halkola, instead of Tommi Taurula, during few episodes on the 11th season, because Taurula was temporarily at sick leave.
- Gunnar Mustavaara was first played by Antti Seppä from 2016 to 2017. Raimo Grönberg took over the role in November 2017, due to Seppä's retirement.
- Viola Angervuo (formerly Helenius) was first briefly played in 2015 to 2016 by Annalisa Tyrväinen. Tyrväinen was replaced by Vivi Wahlström in November 2016.
- Aino Kaukovaara (later Forss) first appeared in the series from 2008 to 2010 as child and was played by Janna Ilmanen, but when the character returned to the film and spin-off-series as adult in 2014 and 2015 together with series in 2018. Ilmanen has been replaced by Jasmin Voutilainen. The character was played by Jessica Öystilä during few episodes on the 23rd season, due to Voutilainen's sick leave. The character has also been played by Laura Allonen, due to Voutilainen's sick leave again due mental health issues. Voutilainen has later committed suicide. The role was taken over by Tiia Weckström.
- Nella Tamminen was played by Sonja Kasurinen from 2014 to 2018, but got replaced by Emma Nopanen.
- Elina Taalasmaa was first played by Sanna Luostarinen from 1999 to 2008. When the character returned in April 2020, the role was taken over by Inna Tähkänen, due to Luostarinen's retirement from acting.
- Mangus Mustavaara was first played as a baby by Ukko Sirén from 2017 to 2020. In 2024, Mangus returned to the series as a high schooler played by Leevi Rapeli.
- Maija Aro was first played as a baby by Hertta Yrjänä from 2006 to 2008. In 2026, Maija returned grown up to the series played by Linda Nurmi.

=== Possibly returning cast members ===
Actor	Character	Duration
Constantinos Mavromichalis	Romeo Aro	2006–2008, 2026–present
Elmeri Ylä-Rautio	Matias Kajander	2020–2026
Akseli Sarvilinna	Vertti Seppänen	2024–2026
Leevi Rapeli	Magnus Mustavaara (#2)	2024–2026

- Ylä-Rautio, Sarvilinna, and Rapeli were written out of the show due to their military service. It is uncertain whether they will return.
- Romeo Aro is set to make a comeback to the show in the autumn of 2026.

== Former cast and characters ==
=== Last appeared in 2026 ===
Actor	Character	Duration
Anniina Piiparinen	Riikka Mäkeläinen	2025–2026
Esko Eerikäinen	Petri Simola	2022, 2024, 2026
Maija Lang	Lea Axelsson	2026
Inna Tähkänen	Elina Taalasmaa (#2)	2020–2023, 2026

=== Last appeared in 2025 ===
Actor	Character	Duration
Tuija Piepponen	Mirja Mattila	2007, 2009, 2022, 2025
Mia Ehrnrooth	Cindy Rintala	2009–2014, 2016, 2021–2023, 2025
Emma Nopanen	Nella Tamminen (#2)	2018–2025
Elina Niskanen	Anniina Aalto	2024–2025
Viivi Pumpanen	Kikka Granberg	2024, 2025
Markku Pulli	Joonatan Sievinen	2007–2010, 2011–2015, 2021–2025
Tiia Elg	Eva Tamminen	2014–2025
Sienna Nord	Nadja Tamminen	2020–2021, 2022–2025
Aida Fanfani	Erika Ekholm	2023–2025

=== Last appeared in 2024 ===
Actor	Character	Duration
Maija-Liisa Peuhu	Ulla Taalasmaa	1999–2007, 2010, 2013–2024
Jarmo Koski	Seppo Taalasmaa	1999–2013, 2017, 2020–2021, 2024
Arvo Jean-Michael Ärlig	Atte Karvinen	2024
Antti Honka	Arttu Karvinen	2024
Aarni Kivinen	Panu Kaukovaara	2008–2010, 2022, 2023, 2024
Vivi Wahlström	Viola Angervuo (#2)	2016–2024
Miska Haakana	JP Kokko	2022–2024
Hugo Laakso	Ilo Angervuo	2023–2024
Tiia Weckström	Aino Forss (#5)	2023–2024
Tuuli Mattila	Susu Honkanen	2020–2024
Juha-Sakari Hippi	Rami Markkanen	2023–2024
Konsta Hietanen	Miki Kajander	2020–2024

=== Last appeared in 2023 ===
Actor	Character	Duration
Juho Orpana	Robin Marklund	2021–2023
Tiia Louhevaara	Anna-Liisa "Ansku" Lahti	2022–2023
Oliver Hatava	Toivo Taalasmaa	2021–2023
Olga Heikkala	Mira Angervuo	2018–2023

=== Last appeared in 2022 ===
Actor	Character	Duration
Nora Rinne	Camilla Mustavaara	2001–2004, 2014, 2015, 2016–2021, 2022
Aku Sipola	Jere Sievinen	2020–2022
Susanna Laine	Marika Honkanen	2021–2022
Jessica Öystilä	Aino Kaukovaara (#3)	2021–2022
Lars Lindqvist	Markku Mattila (#2)	2022
Antti Reini	Jokke Ruohonen	2022
Aron Syrjä	Leo Sievinen	2022
Laura Allonen	Aino Kaukovaara (#4)	2022
Jasmin Voutilainen	Aino Kaukovaara (#2)	2018–2022

=== Last appeared in 2021 ===
Actor	Character	Duration
Inga Sulin	Karin Ekholm	2001–2002, 2021
Emil Hallberg	Onni "Tale" Taalasmaa (#2)	2011–2018, 2019–2020, 2021
Irina Vartia	Monica Mustavaara	2014–2018, 2019, 2020–2021
Maija Rissanen	Pirita Salonius	2016, 2017–2018, 2020, 2021
Roope Puhakka	Severi Sievinen (#3)	2016–2021
Aaron Bojang	Benjamin Taalasmaa (#2)	2017–2021
Julia Korpinen	Anna Ihalainen	2019–2021
Ilona Chevakova	Sabrina Mustavaara	2019–2021
Johanna Ruonala	Kiira Lahtinen	2020–2021
Joonatan Suvinen	Tomi Laiho	2020–2021
Esko Kovero	Kalervo Laitela	2020, 2021
Juha Svahn	Ingvar Mustavaara	2020, 2021
Sari Kuivalainen	Dr. Romppainen (#2)	2020, 2021
Mikko Virtanen	Lauri Rossi	2020–2021
Janne Mattila	Matti Virtanen	2020, 2021
Marjaana Maijala	Silvia Marklund	2021

=== Last appeared in 2020 ===
Actor	Character	Duration
Heli Perttula	Päivi Helenius	2006, 2017, 2020
Hemmo Karja	Janne Haukkala	2011–2019, 2020
Riitta Elstelä	Anni Vatanen	2011–2012, 2019, 2020
Kerttu Rissanen	Sanni Pohjonen	2014–2020
Ruupertti Arponen	Ilja Taalasmaa (#2)	2015–2020
Tuomas Happo	Pupu	2016–2020
Eva Adamson	Tiina Järvinen	2017–2018, 2020
Ukko Sirén	Magnus Mustavaara (#1)	2017–2018, 2019, 2020
Nora Rinne	Satu Similä	2018–2019, 2020
Pablo Ounaskari	Ressu Mattila	2019–2020
Ville Kettunen	Samuli Palokoski	2019–2020
Celin El Azizi	Victoria Saari	2019–2020
Lemmy Alapeteri	Rasmus Joenperä (#2)	2020
Rinna Paatso	Ritva Ryynänen	2020

=== Last appeared in 2019 ===
Actor	Character	Duration
Tuomas Kytömäki	Aleksi Salin	1999–2004, 2008, 2014, 2019
Johanna Nurmimaa	Paula Sievinen	2004–2012, 2013–2014, 2018–2019
Marko Reinola	Jarkko Peltonen	2007–2009, 2010, 2019
Tero Tiittanen	Sergei Kuula	2008, 2011, 2012–2017, 2018, 2019
Sara Parikka	Peppi Puolakka	2008–2014, 2015–2016, 2017–2019
Ronny Roslöf	Lari Väänänen	2011, 2012–2017, 2018–2019
Daniela Hoffström	Taiga Kuula (#2)	2015, 2016, 2018, 2019
Saara Widbom	Dr. Romppainen (#1)	2015, 2016, 2017, 2019
Rauli Ylitalo	Sami Kosonen	2015–2019
Miikka Wallin	Pietari Haukkala	2016–2019
Sofia Arasola	Lola Vinberg	2017–2019
Annemari Laaksonen	Tamara	2018, 2019
Leo Kirjonen	Tero Puustinen	2018–2019
Nora Rinne	Tuula Rautio	2018–2019
Marius Laiho	Tommi Juslin	2018–2019
Aarto Falk/ Isabella	Nadja Tamminen	2019

=== Last appeared in 2018 ===
Actor	Character	Duration
Jarkko Nyman	Sebastian Vuorela (#2)	2009–2010, 2011–2017, 2018
Sonja Kasurinen	Nella Tamminen (#1)	2014–2018
Martina Aitolehti	Seireeni	2015, 2016, 2018
Marjatta Rinne	Salme Hämäläinen	2017–2018
Joni Ollikainen	Mika Joenperä	2017–2018
Luka Pajuhi	Rasmus Joenperä (#1)	2017–2018
Mirja Oksanen	Rosmarine Duncker	2018

=== Last appeared in 2017 ===
Actor	Character	Duration
Olga Temonen	Noora Autio	2007–2008, 2009–2010, 2017
Susanna Mikkonen	Liisa Salo	2010–2014, 2017
Petteri Paavola	Elias Vikstedt (#2)	2011–2016, 2017
Oliver Lehto	Oliver Vuorela (#2)	2013–2017
Anne Nielsen	Anita Pajuniemi	2013, 2017
Janne Saarinen	Anton Helenius	2015–2017
Miia Räikkönen	Raakel Kurki	2015, 2016, 2017
Antti Seppä	Gunnar Mustavaara (#1)	2016–2017
Uncredited	Mikael Salo (#2)	2017
Ami Suojanen-Korhonen	Marjut	2017
Julian Riikonen	Nuutti Seppä	2017

=== Last appeared in 2016 ===
Actor	Character	Duration
Satu Linnapuomi	Kukka-Maaria Kujala	2000, 2016
Ella Pyhältö	Meri Vikstedt	2010, 2011, 2016
Rosa Rusanen	Iida Mustonen (#1)	2011–2016
Rufus Rusanen	Severi Sievinen (#2)	2011–2016
Maria Nieminen	Kristiina Pohjonen/Liisa Laitela	2013–2016
Annalisa Tyrväinen	Viola Helenius (#1)	2015, 2016
Elsa Pankkonen	Moilanen (Ilja Taalasmaa's capturer)	2015, 2016
Venla Saartamo	Kirsi Huovinen	2016
Ville Eerikkilä	Jesse	2016

=== Last appeared in 2015 ===
Actor	Character	Duration
Jaana Saarinen	Maarit Salin	1999, 2000–2004, 2007–2008, 2015
Sannamaija Pekkarinen	Heli Sievinen	2004–2007, 2009–2011, 2012, 2014, 2015
Anneli Ranta	Helena Kuula	2008–2015
Venla Savikuja	Heidi Aaltonen	2009–2015
Juska Reiman	Miska Koistinen	2013–2015
Heidi Hilpinen	Selina	2014, 2015
Annina Rubinstéin	Selina's mother	2014, 2015
Anna Haakana	Young Marianna Kurki	2015
Aurora Haakana	Johanna Kurki	2015
Mikael Kokko	Heikki Pohjonen	2015
Olga Wasenius	Ilja Taalasmaa (#1)	2015

=== Last appeared in 2014 ===
Actor	Character	Duration
Jutta Lehtinen	Katri Sievinen	2003–2007, 2008, 2009, 2012, 2014
Ville Seivo	Tuomo Tervajoki	2006–2008, 2011, 2014
Kirsi Ståhlberg	Isabella Holm/Pirjo Luokkanen	2008–2014
Mirva Kuivalainen	Veera Puolakka	2008–2009, 2011, 2013, 2014
Jasmin Hamid	Katariina Mäkelä (#1)	2009–2014
Lari Laurikkala	Niko Vainio (#4)	2009–2011, 2014
Silja Rantala	Vanessa Turunen	2011–2014
Saara Kytö	Taiga Kuula (#1)	2013–2014
Sirja Minkkinen	Kaisla	2013–2014
Perttu Hangaslahti	Mikko Kannas	2013–2014
Pedro Ramsey	David	2013, 2014
Pekka Kauhanen	Hannes Holopainen	2014
Roi Ron	Hannu Holopainen	2014
Krista Nyman	Real Isabella Holm	2014
Tomi Soikkeli	Young Jarkko Peltonen	2014
Petteri Avilia	Luka	2014
Jenni Banerjee	Katariina Mäkelä (#2)	2014
Sami Haavisto	Rampe	2014
Joni Saarela	Rönkkö	2014
Marko Äijö	Skäbä	2014
Juho Lehto	Pekka Toroppa	2014

=== Last appeared in 2013 ===
Actor	Character	Duration
Anu Palevaara	Jenni Vainio	1999–2001, 2002–2011, 2012–2013
Anu Koskinen	Katja Vainio	1999–2003, 2004, 2011, 2013
Sami Sarjula	Ossi Puolakka	2004–2013
Aku Laitinen	Heiskanen	2009, 2010, 2013
Olivia Paldanius	Oliver Vuorela/Ossi Junior (O.J.) Puolakka (#1)	2011–2013
Pauliina Jokinen	Matleena Rintala	2012–2013
Henri Kaisla	Roni Jalava	2012–2013
Rami Rusinen	Valtteri Elovirta (#2)	2012, 2013
Hellevi Härkönen	Martta Rintala	2012, 2013
Kalle Jokela	Aksu	2013
Aku Laitinen	Sirviö	2013
Nevena Ek	Anna	2013
Victor Kalmari	Kim Kosonen	2013
Vivica Hedman	Lotta	2013
Ritva Loijas	Hedda	2013
Antti Kankainen	Lauri Pyhämaa	2013
Pekka Kokko	Frans Taskinen	2013
Ari-Matti Hedman	Ilkka Väänänen	2013

=== Last appeared in 2012 ===
Actor	Character	Duration
Piitu Uski	Laura Kiviranta	1999–2008, 2012
Juha Poikela	Criminal constable Hyttinen	2009, 2011–2012
Aarre Karén	Olavi Kanerva/Igor Kuula	2009, 2012
Timo-Pekka Luoma	Antti Polvijärvi	2010–2012
Olli Riipinen	Kuronen	2010, 2011, 2012
Mirja Oksanen	Tiina Lehti	2010, 2012
Mikko Kauppila	Aarni Räsänen	2011, 2012
Salli Suvalo	Maria Mustonen	2011, 2012
Juha Veijonen	Mikael Salo (#1)	2012
Anne Aitolehti	Eila Hirvonen	2012
Tony Honkanen	Ville Kurtti	2012
Kari Hakala	Johannes Rintala	2012
Juhani Rajalin	Dr. Siponen	2012

=== Last appeared in 2011 ===
Actor	Character	Duration
Jussi Wahlgren	Juhani Routaketo	2009–2011
Juha-Pekka Mikkola	Miika Mäkelä	2009–2010, 2011
Hannu Abonce	Tobias "Topi" Nylund	2010–2011
Johanna Tuomi	Armi Viitamäki	2010–2011
Santtu Hänninen	Alexander Holm	2011
Satu Pikkusaari	Siru Honkanen	2011
Outi Condit	Kiia Hyvönen	2011
Hannele Lauri	Korppi	2011
Eeva Vauhkonen	Liisa Toivio	2011
Heikki Vilja	Erkki Moilanen	2011

=== Last appeared in 2010 ===
Actor	Character	Duration
Tiia Louste	Leea Leivo	2000, 2010
Markku Pajurinen	Petteri Virtanen	2003–2007, 2009, 2010
Sara Lohiniva	Oona Kiviranta (#4)	2007–2010
Janna Ilmanen	Aino Kaukovaara (#1)	2008–2010
Mira Kivilä	Iiris Kaukovaara	2008–2010
Villem Puntonen	Otto Kaukovaara	2008–2010
Patrik Borodavkin	Miro Holm	2008–2010
Antti Launonen	Tuukka Aaltonen	2009–2010
Lucas Ahokas	Benjamin Taalasmaa (#1)	2009–2010
Tung Bui	Noa Okada	2009–2010
Sisu Koukkula	Severi Sievinen (#1)	2009–2010
Saija Lentonen	Sara Polvijärvi	2009, 2010
Markku Toikka	Asko Erkkilä	2010
Satu Paavola	Minttu Erkkilä	2010
Sue Willberg	Sonya Fadiga	2010
Jussi Salminen	Kimmo Kylmälä	2010
Janne Turkki	Esa Leivo	2010
Jasmine Nystén	Venla Salo	2010
Saara Pakkasvirta	Elsa Toivio	2010
Niilo Heinonen	Elias Vikstedt (#1)	2010

=== Last appeared in 2009 ===
Actor	Character	Duration
Johanna Raunio	Tanja Jääskeläinen	2005–2009
Oona Louhivaara	Juulia Autio	2007–2009
Teemu Lehtilä	Eero Vanala	2007–2009
Saija Palin	Niina Kanerva	2008–2009
Juhani Rajalin	Dr. Kujala	2008–2009
Heidi Herala	Raija Autio	2008, 2009
Pasi Raunio	Timo Autio	2009
Jouko Uusipaasto	Peter Grynqvist	2009
Ossi Ahlapuro	Markku Mattila (#1)	2009
Henna Hyttinen	Anna Mutanen	2009
Emil Söderström	Konsta Nurmi	2009
Paula Siimes	Riitta Sievinen	2009
Mira Taussi	Satu Sievinen	2009
Miikka Tuominen	Johan Brunberg	2009
Teemu Ojanne	Hannu Saari	2009
Henri Halkola	Kari Taalasmaa (#2)	2009
Daniel Westerholm	Tero (Ossi Puolakka's friend)	2009
Harri Liuksiala	Maukka	2009
Teemu Kemppainen	Young Aaro Vaalanne	2009
Ville Kemppainen	Young Eero Vanala	2009
Teemu Lehtilä	Aaro's and Eero's father	2009

=== Last appeared in 2008 ===
Actor	Character	Duration
Sanna Luostarinen	Elina Taalasmaa (#1)	1999–2008
Tuomas Reunanen	Ami Vainio	2001–2008
Timo-Pekka Luoma	Officer Raittinen	2005, 2007, 2008
Hertta Yrjänä	Maija Aro (#1)	2006–2008
Tommi Saarinen	Sami Pajola	2006–2008
Niina Hosiasluoma	Kaija Moilanen	2006–2008
Petri Ahonen	Ari-Pekka "AP" Isola	2006, 2008
Anna Korolainen	Amanda	2007–2008
Sami Ristiniemi	Rafael Aro	2007–2008
Anni Jaatinen	Jasmin	2007–2008
Miro Tuomi	Rasmus	2007–2008
Tiia Ilmanen	Sofia Salin (#2)	2007–2008
Väinö Ahonen	Onni Taalasmaa (#1)	2007–2008
Juha Karhu	Niko Vainio (#3)	2007–2008
Antti Ahtinen	Puli	2007–2008
Lasse Karkjärvi	Alpo Lassila	2007, 2008
Kirsti Kaarakainen	Anneli Mansikka	2007, 2008
Leena Rapola	Saini Perälä	2007, 2008
Johanna Heimonen	Armi Nopola	2007, 2008
Pinja Flink	Milla Muurinen	2008
Iiro Veck	Aatu Päivinen	2008
Tomi Salmela	Kristo Päivinen	2008
Sirpa Teppola	Tuuli Rantala	2008
Miia Maaranen	Ilona Salo	2008
Eeva-Liisa Haimelin	Aila Mäki	2008
Jarmo Mäkinen	Leo Sievinen	2008
Elina Vehkaoja	Anu Määttä	2008
Lilia Rönkkö	Elisa	2008
Teemu Kataja	Eemeli Tikka	2008
Salla Valkonen	Essi Tikka	2008
Laura Orttenvuori	Korpelainen	2008
Heikki Herva	Lasse Ala-Kulju	2008
Maaria Rantanen	Lawyer Tuiranen	2008
Aku Ojala	Olli Neuvonen	2008
Nina Mamila	Ramona Moriha	2008
Jukka Uhlgren	Kahliainen	2008
Arja Pekurinen	Teather Jeskanen	2008
Marika Karlsson	Lissu	2008

=== Last appeared in 2007 ===
Actor	Character	Duration
Risto Törhönen	Niko Vainio (#2)	2004–2007
Emmi Parviainen	Annika Sievinen	2004–2007
Kasperi Nordman	Antero Voima	2005, 2006–2007
Teemu Palosaari	Pete Niiranen	2006–2007
Saila Laakkonen	Emma Ilola	2006–2007
Marjo Lahti	Minna Salonen	2006, 2007
Martina Aitolehti	Mari	2007
Matti Airas	Vesa Nokela	2007
Minna Turunen	Taru Saaristo	2007
Essi Kaila	Auli Laaksonen	2007
Johanna Tukiainen	Petra	2007
Linda Kaarakainen	Minttu	2007
Juha Hippi	Jussi	2007
Hanna Hurskainen	Jatta Komulainen	2007
Riku Korhonen	Sebastian Vuorela (#1)	2007

=== Last appeared in 2006 ===
Actor	Character	Duration
Joona Mielonen	Kasper Koponen	2003–2006
Janne Vakio	Riku Jääskeläinen	2004–2006
Wilhelmiina Seppä	Oona Kiviranta (#3)	2004–2006
Sanna-June Hyde	Teresa Ala-Uotila	2004–2006
Petra Frey	Irma Halonen	2005–2006
Julius Pillai	Taneli Halonen	2005–2006
Paavo Liski	Yrjö Merilä	2005–2006
Nina Jääskeläinen	Pipsa Tiilikainen	2005–2006
Rabbe Smedlund	Vesa Koskela	2005–2006
Anu Sinisalo	Anna-Maija Halonen	2006
Kai Hyttinen	Antti Jääskeläinen	2006
Susanna Laine	Sirpa	2006
Minna Rimpilä	Kirsi Petäjä	2006

=== Last appeared in 2005 ===
Actor	Character	Duration
Aleksi Sariola	Ken Ojala	2001–2005
Samuli Nordberg	Daniel Ojala	2002–2004, 2005
Eero Tommila	Sauli Kiviranta (#2)	2003–2005
Katja Salminen	Jutta Ojala	2003, 2004, 2005
Birgitta Öunap	Margareta Strömberg	2004–2005
Jukka-Pekka Palo	Heikki Ratila	2004–2005
Petri Liski	Juha Viljanen	2004–2005
Pertti Roisko	Reima Syvärinen	2004, 2005
Heidi Krohn	Selma Viljanen	2005
Heli Sirviö	Siru Koivisto	2005
Ilpo Mikkonen	Aarne Koskinen	2005
Hanna-Riikka Siitonen	Leena Ruohonen	2005

=== Last appeared in 2004 ===
Actor	Character	Duration
Jouko Keskinen	Jukka Salin	1999–2004
Kristo Salminen	Toni Veijalainen	1999–2000, 2003, 2004
Alexandra and Patricia von Sybel	Sofia Salin (#1)	2000–2004
Helena Notkonen	Eila Kiviranta	2000, 2003, 2004
Saija-Reetta Kotirinta	Inka Haapala	2001–2004
Sanna Sepponen	Roosa Kemppainen	2001–2004
Henna Tanskanen	Aamu Korhonen	2001–2004
Mika Kurvinen	Teemu Korhonen	2001–2004
Susanna Indrén	Jaana Nieminen	2001–2004
Vesa Ruusuvuori	Tom Bergqvist	2001, 2003, 2004
Okko Salminen	Niko Vainio (#1)	2002–2004
Linnea Lindström	Oona Kiviranta (#1)	2003–2004
Anni Weppling	Oona Kiviranta (#2)	2003–2004
Aapo Vilhunen	Jaakko Ruohojärvi	2003–2004
Soila Komi	Sirkka-Liisa Ruohojärvi	2003–2004
Gazmend Jusufi	Timi Zogu	2003–2004
Jussi Johnsson	Simo Heikinjuntti	2003, 2004
Jatta Ansamaa	Susanna Tapanainen	2004
Juhani Rajalin	Esko Mäkinen	2004
Tarja Matilainen	Maila Virkkunen	2004
Elias Mäkelä	Benjamin	2004
Aila Herronen	Kerstin	2004

=== Last appeared in 2003 ===
Actor	Character	Duration
Tarja Omenainen	Hanna Salin (#1)	1999–2003
Kari Mattila	Tapani Paju	1999–2000, 2001, 2002, 2003
Joni Leponiemi	Petri Veijalainen	1999, 2000, 2002, 2003
Susa Saukko	Sinna Jokinen	2002–2003
Petri Rajala	Henrik Lammi	2002–2003
Jani Karvinen	Ville Paananen	2002–2003
Kai Vaine	Ilari Pesonen	2002–2003
Juuso Väätäinen	Roope Hänninen	2002–2003
Jussi Ratia	Jari Rauhala	2002, 2003
Markku Nieminen	Veli Haapala	2003
Sami Saikkonen	Jasu Taavitsainen	2003
Antero Nieminen	Raivo Vihkama	2003
Jani Wahlberg	Karttunen	2003
Anni Törhönen	Lotta Niskanen	2003
Merituuli Airaksinen	Hanna Salin (#2)	2003

=== Last appeared in 2002 ===
Actor	Character	Duration
Jasper Pääkkönen	Saku Salin	1999–2002
Andrei Sandberg	Markus Ekholm	1999–2002
Venla Saartamo	Miia Laitela	1999–2002
Jonna Keskinen	Silja Hickley	1999–2000, 2001, 2002
Aku Laitinen	Dr. Per-Olaf Strandberg	1999, 2002
Miska Kajanus	Keijo "Keke" Naukkarinen	2001–2002
Sonja Pekkola	Sari Järvenpää	2001–2002
Sinikka Sokka	Marja Pihlaja	2002
Jerry Mikkelinen	K-P Virtanen	2002
Jyrki Könnömäki	Jyrki "Jykä" Willberg	2002
Alain Azerot	Jacques Dechamps	2002
Suvi Isotalo	Janina	2002
Reeta-Leena Korhola	Jonna	2002
Olavi Uusivirta	Nappe	2002
Eero Ritala	Jere	2002

=== Last appeared in 2001 ===
Actor	Character	Duration
Karoliina Kudjoi	Rauni Koivukuja	1999–2001
Svante Korkiakoski	Taisto Ruukki	1999, 2000, 2001
Kristofer Möller	Juha Palin	1999, 2000, 2001
Mariko Pajalahti	Virpi Hurme	2000–2001
Ismo Kallio	Erik Ekholm	2000–2001
Juhani Kauranen	Sauli Kiviranta (#1)	2000–2001
Mae Navarro	Chiqi Li	2000–2001
Vera Kiiskinen	Petra Rinne	2000–2001
Vesa Hämes	Pekka Lehtinen	2000, 2001
Sinikka Moilanen	Päivikki Helander	2000, 2001
Teijo Eloranta	Esko Heikkilä	2001
Jussi Ollila	Rami Hirvonen	2001
Seppo Pääkkönen	Jarkko Juonala	2001
Miia Nuutila	Anna Järvinen	2001
Jutta Lehtinen	Sari	2001
Antero Vartia	Kuisma Savolainen	2001
Laura Kotimäki	Tupu	2001
Antti Vappula	Simo Hakala	2001
Harri Soinila	Vesa Oittinen	2001
Marko Reinola	Paavo Portinen	2001
Heidi Vaarna	Kirsi Grönroos	2001

=== Last appeared in 2000 ===
Actor	Character	Duration
Miska Toiviainen	Mika Paju	1999–2000
Terno Zitron	Atte Tenola	1999–2000
Rinna Paatso	Minde Messenius	1999–2000
Hannele Kainulainen	Eeva Harakka	1999, 2000
Jean-Paul Kaijanen	Martti Viljanen	1999, 2000
Mikko Leskelä	Harri Järvi	1999, 2000
Karoliina Blackburn	Stephanie	1999, 2000
Anne Hiekkaranta	Johanna Ström	1999, 2000
Tiina Bergström	Sonja Remes	1999, 2000
Juho Milonoff	Jaska Aarnio	2000
Anssi Hakanen	Atso Niit	2000
Tero Autero	Niko Bergman	2000
Matti Ristinen	Valtteri Elovirta (#1)	2000
Hermanni Rask	Kai Jaakola	2000
Esa-Matti Pölhö	Toivo Karhu	2000
Minna Päkkilä	Krista Koivula	2000
Helmi Seppälä	Vuokko - The Girl of Noahides	2000
Hanna Koistinen	Outi	2000
Sami Lanki	Pertti "Vemmu" Pihlaja	2000
Marjorita Huldén	Birgitta Vainio	2000
Veikko Honkanen	Iiro Vainio	2000
Kari Kinnaslampi	Oiva Jalonen	2000
Vilma Mattila	Pauliina Lehtinen	2000
Irina Pulkka	Sonja Routa	2000

=== Last appeared in 1999 ===
Actor	Character	Duration
Pirjo Luoma-aho	Susanna VIitta	1999
Heikki Herva	Kristofer Gyllendorff	1999
Petteri Summanen	Hege	1999
Jarkko Rantanen	Tippa	1999
Kari Kinnaslampi	Oiva Jalonen	1999
Kirsti Väänänen	Pamela Johansson/Päivi Juppunen	1999
Mikael Kokko	Timi Koivisto	1999
Mia Penttilä	Kristiina	1999
Veera Tiainen	Niina	1999
Petri Manninen	Pasi Ruotsalainen	1999
Aune Lind	Riitta Ruukki	1999
Heikki Lund	Voitto Sutela	1999
Jussi Puhakka	Tommi Tiihonen	1999
Kai Salomaa	Immu Vihuri	1999
Matti Simola	Pete	1999
Mika Lahdenperä	Tane	1999
Annukka Blomberg	Dr. Kantola	1999
Mikko Rokka	Dr. Taraste	1999
Johanna Keinänen	Kaisu Pylkkänen	1999
Ari Pöntinen	Saff manager Bergholm	1999
Metsälintu Pahkinen	Tanja	1999
Jukka Kärkkäinen	Pentti Koura	1999
Johannes Voutilainen	Teemu	1999
Esko Vuorio	Antero Tuppurainen	1999
Maria Sid	Eerika Palin	1999
Tarja Siimes	Maiju Lohikoski	1999

== Books based on the series ==
- Miia ja Saku (2000) (Miia and Saku)
- Kallen inttivuosi (2001) (Kalle in the army)
- Siljan Jenkkivuosi (2001) (Silja in America)
- Aamun uudet kuviot (2001) (Aamu's new plans)
- Saku ja suuri suru (2002) (Saku and the great grief)
- Teemun tarina (2002) (Teemu's story)
- Aamu, Inka ja ihana Ilari (2003) (Aamu, Inka and lovely Ilari)
- Ken ja isosiskon viimeinen kesä (2003) (Ken and big sister's last summer)
- Ami ja ensirakkaus (2004) (Ami's first love)
- Annika ja Amerikan unelma (2005) (Annika and the American Dream)
- Ken ja Sauli kaukana kotoa (2006) (Ken and Sauli far away from home)
- Ossi ja lumikuningatar (2007) (Ossi and the Snow Queen)
- Romeo ja onnentähti (2008) (Romeo and the lucky star)
- Sofia ja salaisuuksien kevät (2008) (Sofia and the spring of secrets)
- Salla ja haaveiden kaupunki (2009) (Salla and the city of dreams)

== See also ==
- Rantabaari
- Kotikatu
- Nightmare (2012 film)
