= Nightmare (2012 film) =

- Original Finnish film poster
- Finnish: Nightmare – painajainen merellä
- Directed by: Marko Äijö
- Written by: Tiina Tanskanen; Teemu Salonen
- Produced by: Marko Äijö
- Starring: Sara Parikka; Venla Savikuja; Mikko Parikka; Markku Pulli; Tero Tiittanen
- Cinematography: Antti Takkunen
- Edited by: Marika Sahlman
- Music by: Karl Sinkkonen
- Production company: FremantleMedia Finland
- Distributed by: FS Film Oy
- Release date: 5 December 2012 (Finland)
- Running time: 74 minutes
- Country: Finland
- Language: Finnish
- Budget: €459.529
- Box office: €1.1 million

Nightmare (Finnish: Nightmare – painajainen merellä; literally translated "A Nightmare on the Sea") is a 2012 Finnish horror thriller film directed by Marko Äijö. The film is based on Finnish soap opera television series Salatut elämät; one of the characters of the series, Peppi, is going on a cruise with friends, which is about to take a horrible turn.

The main partner of the film production was the Russian St. Peter Line shipping company, on which the filming was done on the Princess Maria cruise ship. The film's production budget was about €500,000, of which the Finnish Film Foundation's share was €200,000. The theme song of the film is the song "Kyynel kuuluu mereen" ("A Tear Belongs to the Sea") by the duo Vague Musik, with Karoliina Kallio as the singer.

The film grossed about €1.1 million, and it was awarded at the 2013 Jussi Awards with an honorary certificate as the audience's favorite. However, the film received a hostile reception from critics. Critics have given it mostly one star, and it has been described as "absurdly bad".

In 2014, the film received a sequel, Nightmare 2: The Nightmare Continues.

== Plot ==
The newly married 21-year-old Peppi Kuula (Sara Parikka) goes on a cruise with her new husband Sergei (Tero Tiittanen) and friends. During the ship trip, she meets old acquaintances who remind her of unpleasant things from Peppi's past. Then things start happening on the ship and her friends start disappearing. Peppi realizes that the disappearances are somehow related to the drug-related death of Tobias Nylund (Hannu Abonce), in which she was involved. The situation becomes difficult; even old friends seem to have a motive to hurt Peppi.

== Cast ==
- Sara Parikka as Peppi Kuula
- Venla Savikuja as Heidi Aaltonen
- Mikko Parikka as Jiri Viitamäki
- Markku Pulli as Joonatan Sievinen
- Tero Tiittanen as Sergei Kuula
- Patrik Borodavkin as Miro Holm
- Sara Lohiniva as Oona Kiviranta
- Sampsa Tuomala as Sampo Kaukovaara
- Karoliina Blackburn as Tessa Nylund
- Kasimir Baltzar as Max Grigorieff
- Hannu Abonce as Tobias Nylund

== See also ==
- List of Finnish films of the 2010s
- Salatut elämät
