= Kansikas =

Kansikas is a Finnish surname. Notable people with the surname include:

- Tuomas Kansikas (born 1981), Finnish footballer
- Veikko Kansikas (1923–1991), Finnish politician
