= Nora Rinne =

Finnish actress (born 1973)

- Born: 26 July 1973 (age 52); Tuusula, Finland
- Occupation: Actress
- Children: 2

Nora Rinne (née Lähteenmäki, born 26 July 1973) is a Finnish actress. She is best known for her role of Camilla Mustavaara in the Finnish soap opera Salatut elämät, a role she has portrayed intermittently since 2001.

== Career ==
Rinne's first role was in 1999 in the drama series Tunteen palo ("Fire of Emotion"), in which she starred in one of the lead roles. On the big screen, she first appeared in the movie A Charming Mass Suicide (2000).

Rinne is best known for her role of Camilla Mustavaara in MTV3 soap opera Salatut elämät ("Secret Lives"). Camilla is known as a crooked and cold character who is always the first to pursue her own interests. The character played on the slope appeared on the screen from autumn 2001 to October 2004 as she flew a helicopter from her own wedding and left Helsinki. Camilla was supposed to marry Ken Ojala. Rinne worked on the filming of the series from early 2001 to early 2004. In the special episode "Salatut elämät 10 vuotta" seen in January 2009, Rinne portrayed Camilla, who was abroad at the time. In August 2013, it was reported that Rinne would return to Salatut elämät and filming began that fall. She visited the series for a short time in 2014 and 2015, but returned permanently in 2016, leaving temporarily in April of the following year. The next time the character left the series was in September 2018, but returned in late October of that year. Rinne has also appeared in the series in a triple role, first as Camilla's twin sister, Satuna and then for a while also as their biological mother.

After leaving Salatut elämät, Rinne has continued her career in theater. She has also done theater in Norway. Rinne works as a voice actor Radio Suomen in the radio theater series Doctor Raimo - the Kingdom Therapist, which imitates well-known Finns.

Rinne graduated from the Helsinki Theater Academy with a master's degree in theater arts in 2007. In addition to this, she has studied acting in the Theater Laboratory at Kerava. Since 2019, Rinne has been studying for a doctorate in theater at the Helsinki Theater Academy.

== Personal life ==
Rinne is married and has twin sons with her husband. Her sister is screenwriter Miira Karhula.

== Filmography ==
=== Film ===
| Year | Movie | Role |
|---|---|---|
| 2000 | Levottomat | girl on the street (cut out role) |
| 2000 | Hurmaava joukkoitsemurha | Tarja Halttunen |
| 2000 | Lomalla | airport receptionist |
| 2001 | Aleksis Kiven elämä | |
| 2002 | Menolippu Mombasaan | Nurse Sari |
| 2009 | Toinen jalka haudasta | Tarvainen |

=== Television ===
| Year | TV series | Role |
|---|---|---|
| 1999 | Tunteen palo | Maria Kyheröinen |
| 2001 | Benner & Benner | Piia Tamminen |
| 2001–2004, 2014, 2015, 2016– | Salatut elämät | Camilla Mustavaara |
| 2002 | Kylmäverisesti sinun | Rajala's wife |
| 2008 | Joku kaltaiseni | |
| 2008 | Tukka auki | Maija |
| 2009 | Uutishuone | Hilkka Hujanen |
| 2009 | Salatut elämät 10.v | Camilla Mustavaara |
| 2016 | Roba | Marita Puustinen |
| 2016–2017 | Pihlajakadun tuhmat tädit | Camilla Mustavaara |
| 2018–2019, 2020 | Salatut elämät | Satu Similä |
| 2018–2019 | Salatut elämät | Tuula Rautio |
| 2018 | Aallonmurtaja | Tiina |
| 2018 | Hyvät katsojat | herself |
