= Jutta Lehtinen =

Finnish actress

- Born: 10 September 1983 (age 41); Paimio, Finland

Jutta Lehtinen (born 10 September 1983 in Paimio) is a Finnish actress. Lehtinen has a minor role in the 2002 movie Menolippu Mombasaan. Starting in 2003, she has appeared in Finnish television series Salatut elämät, playing the character Katri Sievinen. In Salatut elämät, she portrays a sexy twenty-year-old woman that works in an enterprise called "Snow Team". In the series, she has family problems. Her younger sisters Annika, who is now dead, and Heli are constantly having problems. Sannamaija Pekkarinen, who portrays Katri's younger sister, Heli, is older than Lehtinen in real life. She is actress Salatut elämät since 2003.
