= Kuusankoski =

- District of Kouvola
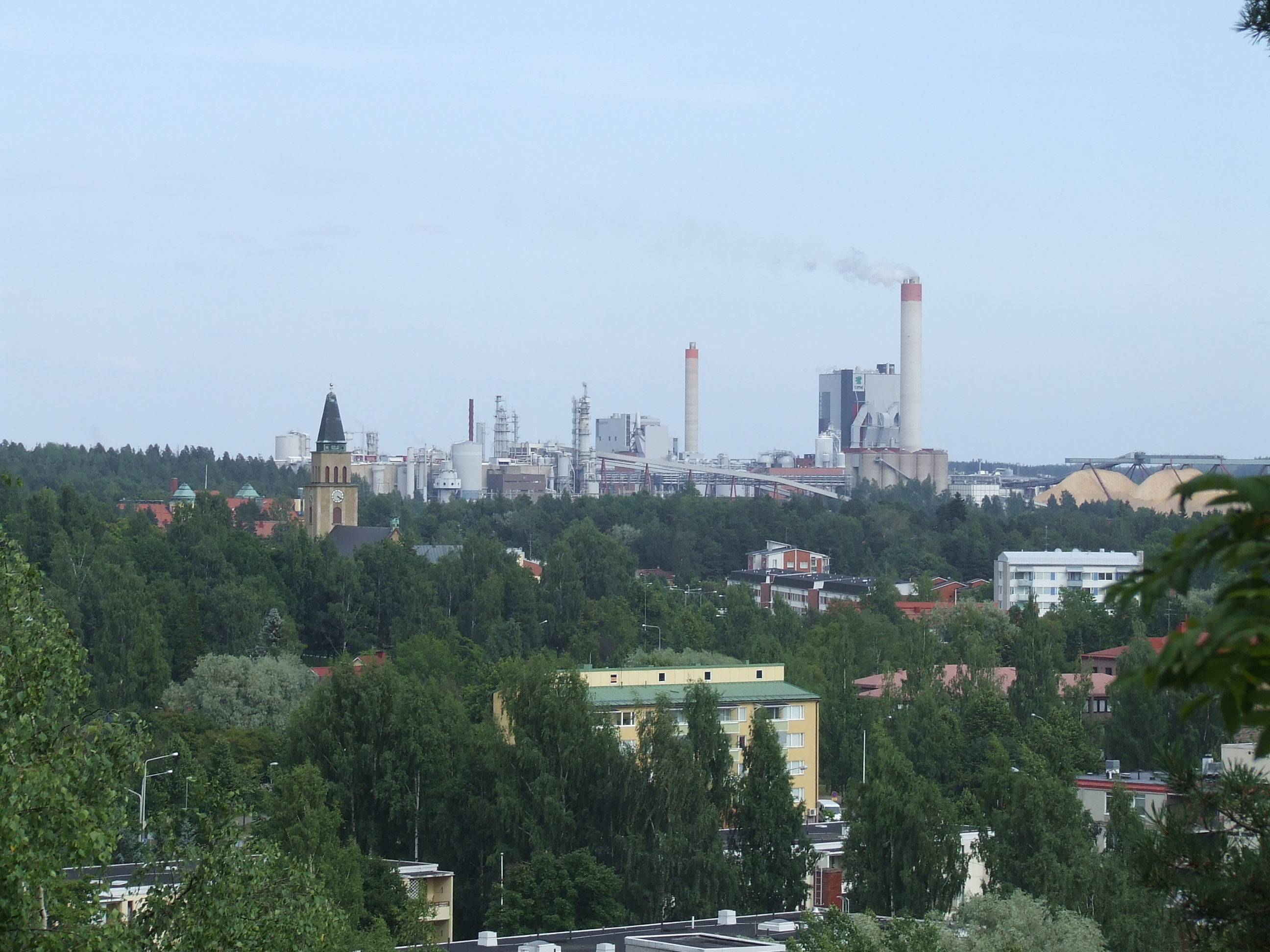
- Interactive map of Kuusankoski
- Country: Finland
- Province: Southern Finland
- Region: Kymenlaakso
- Sub-region: Kouvola sub-region
- City: Kouvola

Population (2015)
  - Total: 18 944
- Time zone: UTC+2 (EET)
  - Summer (DST): UTC+3 (EEST)

Coat of Arms of Kuusankoski

Kuusankoski is a neighbourhood of city of Kouvola, former industrial town and municipality of Finland, located in the region of Kymenlaakso in the province of Southern Finland. The population of Kuusankoski was 20,392 (2003) and the total area was 129.5 km^{2} of which 114 km^{2} was land and 14.56 km^{2} water. It is located some 130 kilometres (80 mi) northeast of the Finnish capital Helsinki. Kuusankoski is primarily known for paper manufacturing and three large factory complexes. It is sometimes nicknamed the "Paper capital of Finland".

== History ==
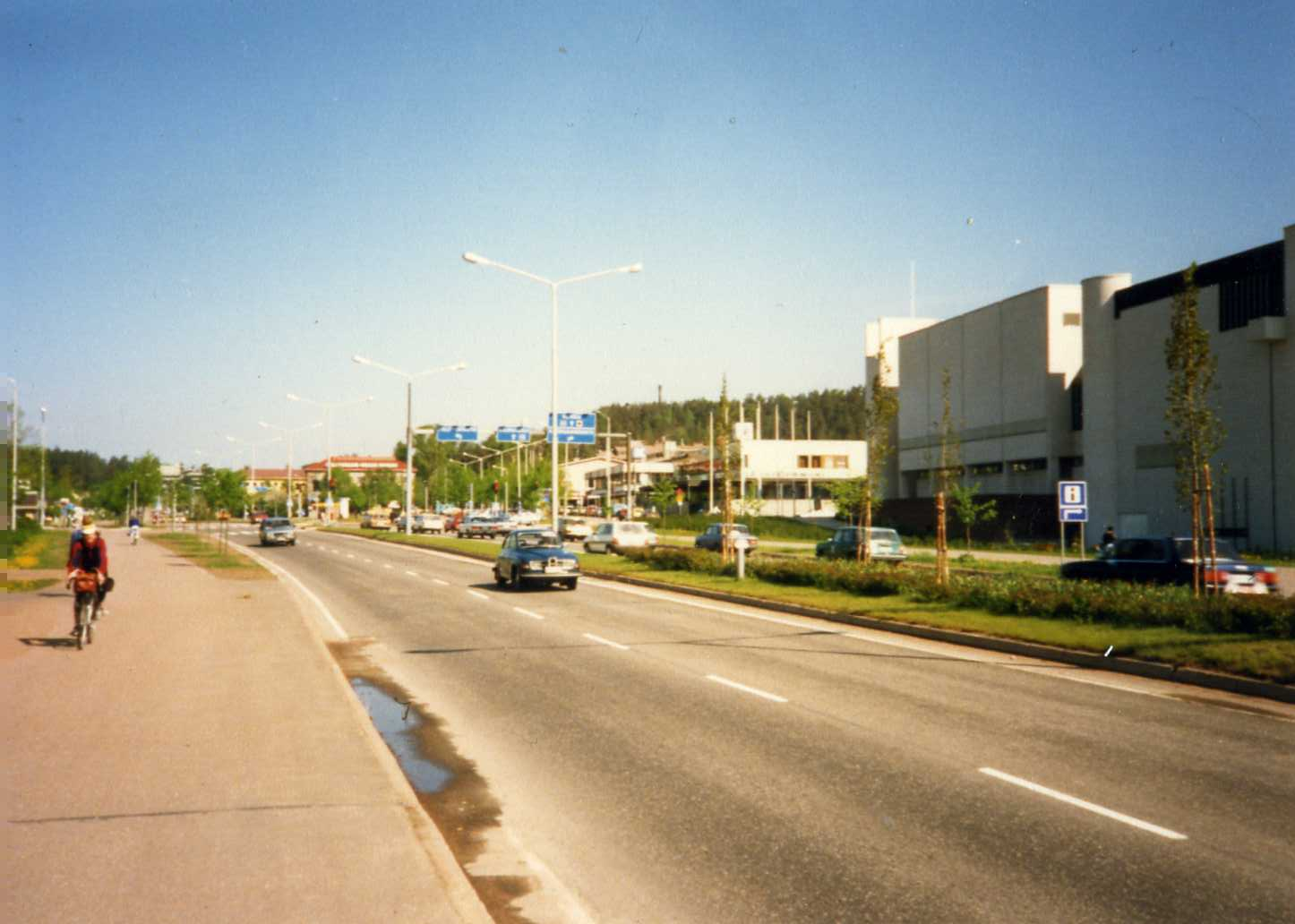
Kuusankoski in the summer of 1987

Kuusankoski (as a municipality, not the settlement), was founded in 1921 from the parts of neighbouring Iitti and Valkeala. It gained the status of kauppala (literally "a place of commerce") in 1957 and became a town in 1973.

The history of Kuusankoski during the last one and a half centuries has been closely linked to the establishment of the paper factories and their development. The establishment of the factories dates back to the 1870s and 1890s, when the rapids of the river Kymijoki were made to deliver electricity to a waking industry. Since then, and until the modern age of automation, the factories have offered jobs to many generations of Kuusankoski citizens, making the area somewhat more prosperous than the neighbouring regions. Today, the influence of the factories on everyday life has somewhat lessened, but their historical importance remains well known.

The cityscape of Kuusankoski consists mostly of element-based blocks of flats built during the 1960s. However, there are some exceptions, such as a school and a church built at the beginning of the last century. Another kind of architecture is represented by the culture building Kuusankoskitalo, a typical creation of modern Finnish architecture, and a library built in a functionalistic style. The cityscape is also characterised by the river Kymijoki which curves through the town.

Footballer Sami Hyypiä is from Kuusankoski. Ex-Nightwish singer Tarja Turunen also lives in the town.

As of 2009, the six municipalities – Kouvola, Kuusankoski, Elimäki, Anjalankoski, Valkeala and Jaala – were consolidated, accounting for the new municipality of Kouvola with a population of over 80,000, being the 10th largest city in Finland.

Until 2008, Mülheim an der Ruhr in Germany was a sister city of Kuusankoski. Following the 2009 merger, the city council of Kouvola decided to continue this partnership.

== Hydropower ==
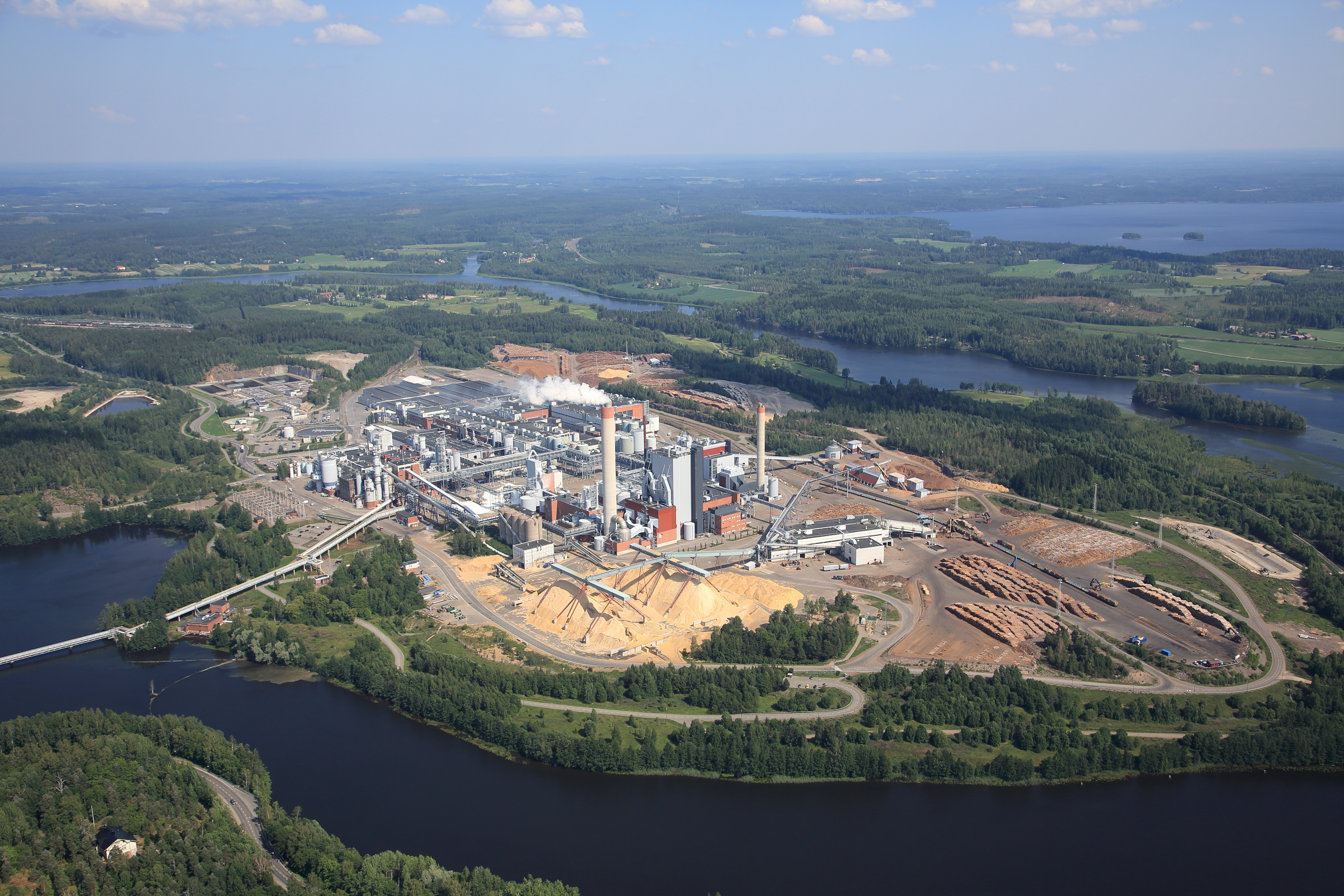
UPM Kymi is a mill integrator located in Kuusankoski, Kouvola.

Plants
Name	Power (MW)	Company
Kuusankoski hydropower plant	30	UPM-Kymmene Oyj
Voikkaa hydropower plant	30	UPM-Kymmene Oyj
Keltti hydropower plant	17	UPM-Kymmene Oyj

== Sport ==
Kuusankoski Speedway track (60°53′28″N 26°38′10″E) is a motorcycle speedway on the southern outskits of the neighbourhood, off the Kuusaantie road. The speedway track held the final of the Finnish Individual Speedway Championship in 2007.

== Notable people ==
- Kalevi Laitinen (1919 – 1995)
- Eeva-Kaarina Volanen (1921 – 1999)
- Veikko Kansikas (1923 – 1991)
- Erkki Kataja (1924 – 1969)
- Aulis Kallakorpi (1929 – 2005)
- Kaj Chydenius (1939 – 2024)
- Maija-Liisa Peuhu (1942 – )
- Esa Jokinen (1958 – )
- Janne Lindberg (1966 – )
- Jukka Heinikainen (1972 – )
- Jani Uotinen (1978 – )
- Jukka Rajala (1982 – )
- Sami Hyypia (1973 – )
- Tero Aarnio (1984 – )
- Jani Sutelainen (1985 – )
