= Pete Lattu =

Finnish actor (born 1979)

- Born: 14 August 1979 (age 46); Helsinki, Finland
- Occupation: Actor
- Children: 2

Pete Lattu (born 14 August 1979, in Helsinki) is a Finnish actor. He is best known for portraying Kalle Laitela in the Finnish soap opera Salatut elämät from 1999 to 2002, and again since 2012.

Pete is married and father of two children. His older sister, Satu Linnapuomi played Kukka-Maaria Kujala in Salatut elämät 2000, 2016.

== Filmography ==
- Salatut elämät 1999 TV-series (Kalle Laitela 1999-2001, 2002, 2012–)
- Atlantis: The Lost Empire 2001 (Milo's voice in the Finnish version)
- Atlantis: Milo's Return 2003 (Milo's voice in the Finnish version)
- Valiant 2005 (Valiant's voice in the Finnish version)
- Saippuaprinssi 2006 (Leo)
- Ruenalla - The Edge 2006 (Short Independent Film about friendship and extreme sports) (Tero)
- Tali-Ihantala 1944 2007 (Radio Operator)
- 8 päivää ensi-iltaan 2008 (barmaid)
- Salatut elämät 10 years 2009 (Kalle Laitela)
- Satula 2015 (Salatut elämät spinoff - Web Series) (Sven-Erik)
