= Piitu Uski =

Finnish actress (born 1967)

- Born: Pirkko Uski; 1967 (age 58–59); Rovaniemi, Finland
- Occupation: Actress

Pirkko "Piitu" Uski (born 1967) is a Finnish actress. She was born in Rovaniemi, Finland. She is best known for her roles in the series Salatut elämät and Kotikatu. She appeared in both seasons of Helsinki Syndrome (2022, 2024). She has also appeared in multiple theatre productions.

Piitu wrote a cookbook, Salatut (keittiö) elämät (Secret (kitchen) lives) with Susanna Laaksonen, a Finnish scriptwriter. Piitu gave her voice to some Fazer radio advertising.
