= Rantabaari =

- Genre: Drama
- Starring: Johanna Puhakka (1-4,6) Matti Leino
- Country of origin: Finland
- Original language: Finnish
- No. of seasons: 6

Production
- Production locations: Helsinki, Finland
- Production company: Fremantle Finland

Original release
- Network: Sub MTV Katsomo C More
- Release: 2019 – present

Related
- Salatut elämät

Rantabaari (Beach Bar) is a Finnish television soap opera series that began airing on Sub in 2019. It is a sister series of MTV3's Salatut elämät. Johanna Puhakka (Alissa Nikkinen), Sofia Arasola (Lola Vinberg), and Miikka Wallin (Pietari Haukkala) from Salatut elämät moved to Rantabaari. The rest of the series' characters were previously unknown. In the third season, Janne Haukkala, played by Hemmo Karja from Salatut elämät, became a central character.

The events of the series were initially also followed on an Instagram account, where the characters updated their news and plot spoilers were also published.

The series has been filmed at Taivallahti in Helsinki, where the events of the series are also centrally located. The series' characters also live in Pikku Huopalahti.

== Premise ==
Rantabaari focuses on the intertwined relationships, conflicts, and dramatic events in the lives of a group of people in Helsinki. The series explores themes of love, betrayal, crime, and ambition, set against the backdrop of modern urban life.

== Cast ==
Role	Actor	Seasons					
Role	Actor	1	2	3	4	5	6
Alissa Nikkinen	Johanna Puhakka						
Anssi Koski	Matti Leino						
Suvi Taivalsalo	Jaana Joensuu						
Ville Fränti	Jaakko Wuolijoki						
Krista Eerola (formerly Eerola-Jokelainen)	Emilia Jansson						
Lola Vinberg	Sofia Arasola						
Milo Vinberg	Eric Barco						
Perttu Männistö	Heikki Ranta						
Janette ”Jartsa” Eerola	Aino Sirje						
Pietari Haukkala	Miikka Wallin						
Sauli Jokelainen	Heikki Slåen						
Olivia Pouru	Sara Ritala						
Pinja Koski	Maria Loikala						
Janne Haukkala	Hemmo Karja						
Lara Berger	Anni Grönberg						
Minna Laurikainen	Mira Rastas						
Tuomas Laurikainen	Ville Pidätys						
Salem	Rami Farooq						
Oskari Männistö / Oskari Patosalmi	Ilkka Olavi						
Kapu/ Joakim Strand	Jonas Saari						
Johanna Järviaho	Sani Aartela						
Luukas Eerola	Tatu Arminen						
Eemeli Lammasniemi	Samuel Glassar						
Riina Järviaho	Ingrid Gräsbeck						
Jaakko Järviaho	Joonas Snellman						
Kaapo Järviaho	Taneli Läykki						
Jessi Heino	Anna Tavaila						
Petteri Sund	Jon-Jon Geitel						
Sofia Alho	Hennariikka Laaksola						
Iiris Eerola	Saara Geitel						
Mimosa Lindell	Joanna Wallinheimo						
Friida Kettunen	Sara Grady						
Akseli Elo	Jasper Koivisto						
Venla Kortelainen	Jessica Öystilä						
Olavi Kangas	Misa Nirhamo						
Mikael Tuominen	Jarno Jussila						
Patrik Merivirta	Ilkka Hautala						
Imatra Koski	Venla Wallenius						
Ilari Koski	Nikolas Ilola						
Nooa Järviaho	Anton Varpama-Taittonen						

(Black - lead, grey - supporting, white - not appearing)

== Production and broadcast ==
Filming for the first season of the series began in April 2019 and continued until August 2019. A total of 100 episodes were filmed during the summer of 2019, which were released as two separate seasons during the fall of 2019 and spring of 2020. With the start of the second season on the C More streaming service in January 2020, Rantabaari became one of the C More original series.

The first season (episodes 1–39) was broadcast during the fall of 2019 three nights a week, from Tuesday to Thursday on the mtv streaming service and on television on the Sub channel at 8 pm. The week's episodes were released in advance on the paid C More service on Tuesdays. The episodes of the second season (40–100) were released on C More so that six episodes were released at a time on Mondays, starting on January 20, 2020. On television, on the Sub channel and on the MTV service, the episodes were shown in the fall of 2020 from Monday to Wednesday.

The third season was filmed in the summer of 2020 and its release began on C More on September 14, 2020. Four new episodes of the series were released on Mondays at 00.01. In 2020, Rantabaari was C More's third most-watched series. On television, the third season was shown in the spring of 2021.

C More confirmed in April 2021 that the series would continue for a fourth season. The season was filmed in the summer of 2021 and its release began on C More in September 2021. The season started airing on MTV Katsomo and Sub in the spring of 2022.

The fifth season of the series was filmed in the summer of 2022 and its release began in the fall of the same year. The season started airing on MTV Katsomo and MTV Sub in the summer of 2023.

The sixth season of the series was originally announced to begin in the fall of 2023, but due to broadcast changes made by MTV, the season ultimately began only at the end of May 2024.

== Series overview ==
Season	Episodes	Originally released
1	39	2019
2	61	2020
3	40	2020
4	60	2021–2022
5	60	2022–2023
6	60	2024

== See also ==
- Salatut elämät
