= Rosa Rusanen =

Finnish actress

Rosa Rusanen (born 1992) is a Finnish actress.

== Career ==
Rusanen is best known for her role as Iida Maria Mustonen in Salatut elämät (English: Secret Lives), which is a daily soap opera that she joined in March 2011. Her younger brother, Rufus, has also acted in this soap opera.

Rusanen’s character is an energetic, popular teenage student, who dances, sings, plays sports, paints and takes part in all the student body activities. The character’s mother, Maria, is a successful psychiatrist, in charge of a private treatment facility. Due to problems in her love life, the character Iida has anorexia; following an ankle injury in real life, Rusanen began to suffer with hypothyroidism, which led to the conclusion of her anorexia storyline due to weight gain. Rumours of pregnancy were denied by the actress herself, who admitted to gaining 30 kilograms.

Due to health issues, Rusanen had to take sick leave in 2016. The actress Pinja Kanon filled in for her, and then in 2017 Kanon played the role of Iida Maria Mustonen on a permanent basis.
