= Tuomas Kytömäki =

Finnish actor

- Born: 14 February 1974 (age 51); Helsinki, Finland

Tuomas Kytömäki (born 14 February 1974, in Helsinki) is a Finnish actor, who became known for his role as Aleksi Salin in the Finnish soap series Salatut elämät in years 1999–2004, 2008, 2014 and again 2019. He won the reality television series contest V.I.P. in 2004.

== Filmography ==
- Salatut elämät as Aleksi Salin (episodes 1–871, 1504–1573, 2685–2688, 3505–3508), (1999–2004, 2008, 2014, 2019)
- Pieni kuolema (1997)
- Suuri seikkailu (2001)
- Kymppitonni (2 episodes, 2005)
- Taistelevat julkkikset (1 episode, 2004)
- V.I.P. seikkailu (2004)
- Kuutamolla (1 episode, 2003)
- Jaajon jacuzzi (1 episode, 2003)
- Näin syntyy Salatut elämät (2000)
