= Sami Ristiniemi =

Finnish actor (born 1977)

- Born: 1977 (age 48–49); Finland

Sami Ristiniemi (born 1977) is a Finnish actor. He has played Rafael Aro in Salatut elämät, and he also hosts the Finnish game show Shop 'til You Drop on Jim.
