= Elias Vikstedt =

- Salatut elämät character
- Actor(s): Niilo Heinonen (2010); Petteri Paavola (2011–2016, 2017)
- Years active: 2010, 2011–2016, 2017
- First appearance: Episode 1899: The past resonates with Cindy (March 25, 2010)
- Last appearance: Episode 3162: Larias hand in hand (March 23, 2017)
- Full name: Elias Vikstedt

In-universe information
- Gender: Male
- Occupation: Student
- Spouses: Miska Koistinen (ex-fiancé); Lari Väänänen (fiancé until Elias' death)
- Age: 20
- Birthplace: Helsinki
- Residence: Helsinki
- Cause of death: Run over by Marianna Kurki
- Parents: Sebastian Vuorela; Cindy Rintala; Meri Vikstedt (adoptive mother)

Relations
- Siblings: Oliver Vuorela (halfbrother); Alexander Holm (halfbrother)(deceased); Iida Mustonen (stepsister)
- Grandparents: Olavi Kanerva; Helena Kuula; Johannes Rintala; Martta Rintala
- Uncles and aunts: Sergei Kuula; Antti Polvijärvi; Niina Kanerva (step-aunt); Matleena Rintala
- Cousin: Taiga Kuula
- Acquaintances: Onni Taalasmaa; Janne Haukkala; Sanni Pohjonen; Marianna Kurki; Isabella Holm; Katariina Mäkelä; Kalle Laitela; Ismo Laitela

Elias Vikstedt (February 10, 1996 – May 10, 2016; on television November 7, 2016) is a fictional character in the Finnish television series Salatut elämät. In 2010, the young Elias was portrayed by Niilo Heinonen. Later, the character returned to the series as an adult, played by Petteri Paavola.

Elias is gay and has become a popular character through his on-off relationship with his boyfriend, Lari, leading to the creation of a phenomenon known as "Larias." Their story has been translated into many languages and has gained many fans around the world. In spring 2015, Elias left the series, but returned in the autumn of the same year. In the episode aired on November 7, 2016, Elias is hit by Lari's cousin, Marianna, and dies from his injuries. In the episode aired on March 17, 2017, Elias appears in Marianna's hallucinations and in Lari's dream.

== Childhood ==
Elias is the first child born to Sebastian Vuorela and Ritva "Cindy" Rintala, but Cindy is unable to raise the boy on her own due to Sebastian being in jail at the time and Cindy being part of a religious cult at that time. In the end, Cindy decides to give Elias up for adoption, and Meri Vikstedt becomes the legal mother of Elias. After several years have passed, Sebastian bumps into his son while he is doing janitorial work and he defends Elias against bully boys in the school. Soon Sebastian wants to know his son better who actually realizes who his biological dad is. Meri gets a job in Brussels and Elias therefore has to move abroad with his mother.

== Elias' return ==
Teenage Elias returns to Finland to escape his mother's homophobic boyfriend Vincent. As soon as Elias gets to know Iida Mustonen and Tale Taalasmaa, he becomes good friends with them, as well as Janne Haukkala. As of that time, Elias was an openly gay boy. As soon as he learned that his father's twin brother (who is later revealed to be his uncle Sergei's best friend) was missing, he went to school in Finland with his new friends. It was Elias' first day at school when he encountered Lari, who began bullying him due to his sexual orientation on the first day. As soon as Lari and Iida begin dating, the bullying continues. Soon enough, Elias meets Cindy, and despite a few difficulties at the beginning, the two begin to build a kind of relationship that is akin to that between a mother and a son.

The following day, Elias develops a crush on Joonatan Sievinen, and after assuming Joonatan to be gay, Elias kisses him. Thereafter, he begins to develop a budding relationship with Ville Kurtti. When Ville kissed another man during a costume party, Elias decided to break up with him. As a result of the costume party, the hockey team chases Elias, and eventually, Lari, the leader of the gang, kisses Elias as a result of his actions.

== Relationships ==
=== Lari Väänänen ===
When Lari kisses him, Elias realises that Lari is gay as well. Elias soon develops feelings for Lari. Eventually Elias and Lari end up in bed. Though Lari is distressed and avoids Elias at the beginning, it soon becomes clear that the two cannot be separated. Lari gets angry at Elias when he finds out that Elias has told Tale about their kiss. Elias gets a concussion while he is trying to make up with Lari in the ice hall. Concerned, Lari finally has to admit to Elias that he cares about him. Lari leaves Iida and starts a relationship with Elias. Their affair does not remain secret for long, and the friendship between Elias and Iida breaks up when Iida realises that Lari has betrayed her with Elias.

Lari's and Elias' affair has a temporary break as well when Lari decides to focus on ice hockey and to go to the training camp in Canada. Lari's homosexuality is revealed to the whole school and Lari, after having been beaten up, has to stop playing ice hockey. In the end Elias comforts Lari, and the two get back together and try to have a more public relationship.

However, Elias starts to become anxious because of Lari, who does not dare to be himself in public or to show affection for him publicly. Eventually Lari tells his father Ilkka about his homosexuality, whose strict attitude forces Lari to escape and to live with Elias. Ilkka does not give up easily, but does everything to keep Lari away from Elias. Eventually Lari gives in to his father and goes to a sexual recuperation camp, and Elias no longer stays in the difficult relationship. Elias ends up cheating on Lari with Miska Koistinen, which Lari soon finds out. The two try to make up and Lari leaves his father, but Elias decides to move on with his life. Elias and Lari have continued the relationship for years until Elias' death.

=== Miska Koistinen ===
Elias starts dating Miska because he wants a long, public and open relationship. However, Elias soon finds out that Miska has been lying to him about helping Lari, who has been living in the streets back then, behind his back. Elias also ends up kissing Lari on Lari's birthday and starts feeling uncertain about who he really wants to be with. However, encouraged by his friends and his father, he decides to continue his relationship with Miska and eventually gets engaged with him. At Katariina Mäkelä's charity dance ball, Elias is shot and sent to the hospital. Soon he tells Lari that he only wants to be friends with him, which pushes Lari to go on to have a relationship with Kalle Laitela. However, Elias soon starts to show jealousy when he sees that Lari was fully himself with Kalle in public. Soon Elias finds out that Miska has been secretly seeing his ex-boyfriend, Jonne. Elias is convinced that Miska has cheated on him.

== The kidnapping ==
Having encountered problems with Miska in their relationship before, Elias ends up getting intimate with Lari. Lari is also having problems in his relationship with Kalle. Elias and Lari end up kissing. Soon the two begin investigating Lari's cousin Marianna's past, suspecting that she is mentally ill. Elias and Lari get closer and end up in bed. They, however, try to keep their relationships with Miska and Kalle, but they do not get the chance to, as Marianna, who is afraid of being caught, kidnaps the boys and tells everyone that the two have slept together and gone on a romantic vacation. Eventually Janne, Miska and Kalle trace the captives. Marianna has also kidnapped Janne and Heidi in her small jail room. Later Miska and Kalle come to rescue the captives from Marianna's prison, which has been built in Marianna's room in her and Heidi's home.

=== After the kidnapping ===
The relationship between Elias and Miska ends soon after the kidnapping because Elias still has feelings for Lari and Miska does not want to continue the relationship anymore. Elias tries to get back together with Lari, but Lari chooses Kalle. Miska wants to get back together with Elias after having left as he realises he still loves Elias. They try to have a relationship again, but Elias decides to leave for Brussels to live with his adoptive mother Meri to "get some fresh air for a while".

Elias, however, comes back in autumn 2015. He soon works for Aki Nikkinen's vine import company Vinotar and performs well at work. Elias takes care of Moose's and Vinotar's co-operation together with Lari.

Elias learns later that Lari has identified the identity of the kidnapper of Sanni's and Tale's son Ilja and has left for the kidnapper's home. Elias carries his uncle, Sergei's illegal gun to Lari, which has been left at Sebastian's house. A scuffle occurs in the kidnapper's apartment, resulting in the gun going off, injuring Lari in the side. The relationship between Elias and Lari continues to flourish while Lari is recovering, but Elias learns that Marianna miscarried Sebastian's child. Marianna was given a day to tell the truth, but Marianna drove over Elias and killed him while he was on his way to meet Lari.

== Love life ==
- Joonatan Sievinen: Elias kisses and has an unrequited infatuation with Joonatan, but Joonatan is straight and does not return Elias' feelings
- Ville Kurtti: ex-boyfriend
- Lari Väänänen: boyfriend until Elias' death
- Miska Koistinen: ex-fiancé
