= Jouko Keskinen =

Finnish actor

Jouko Olavi Keskinen
- Born: 22 October 1950 (age 74); Helsinki, Finland

Jouko Olavi Keskinen (born 22 October 1950, in Helsinki) is a Finnish actor. He is famous for the Finnish soap opera Salatut elämät, where he played Jukka Salin from 1999 to 2004. Jouko's daughter, Jonna played Jukka's daughter, Silja Salin 1999–2000, 2001, 2002.
