= Sara Parikka =

Finnish actress

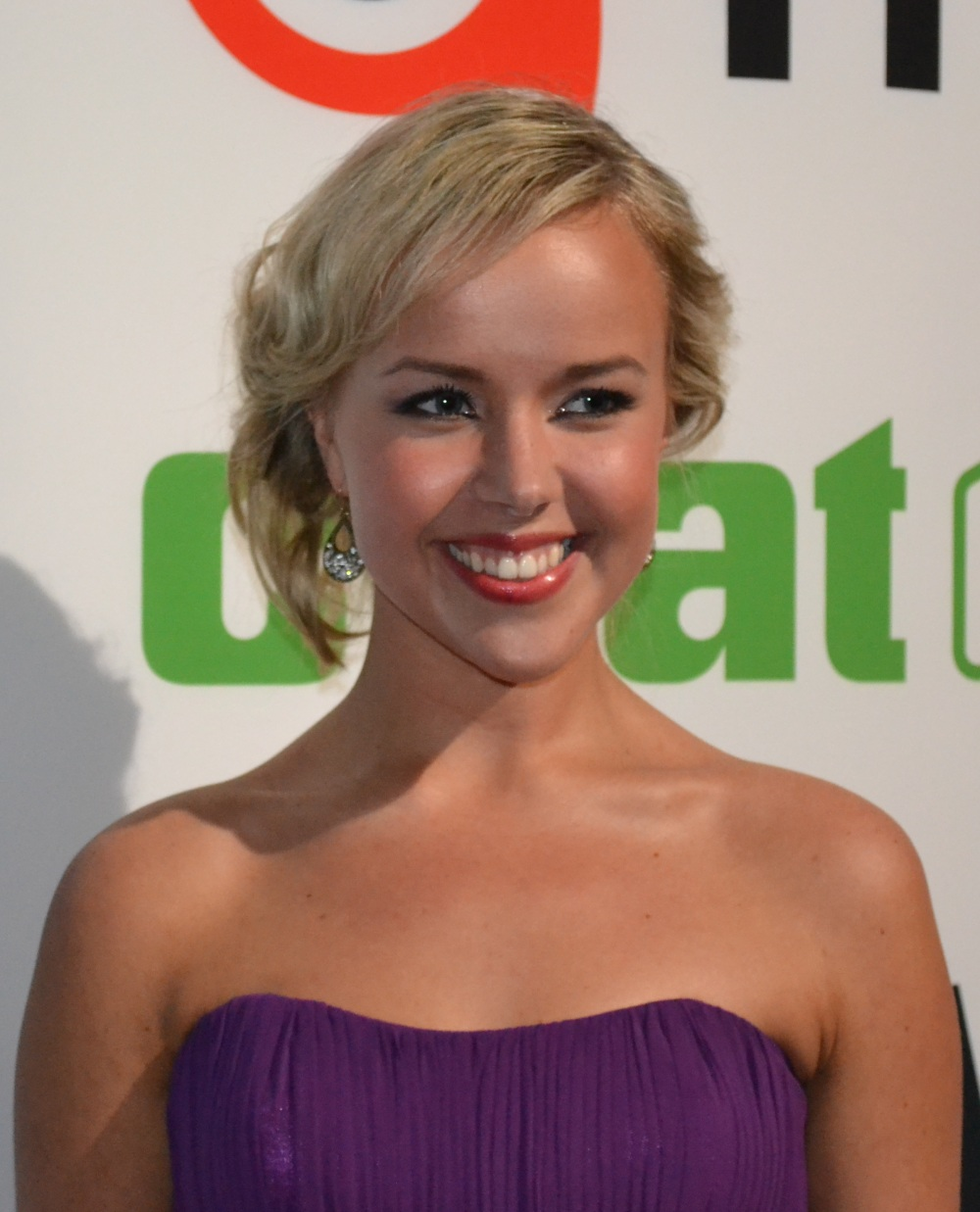
- Born: Sara Helena Säkkinen; 5 March 1991 (age 35); Espoo, Finland
- Spouse: Mikko Parikka (m. 2014)
- Children: 4

Sara Helena Parikka (née Säkkinen; born 5 March 1991) is a Finnish actress, social media influencer and entrepreneur. She is well known for her role as Peppi Puolakka in the television series Salatut elämät, in which she portrayed in 2008–2014, 2015–2016 and 2017–2019.

== Career ==
Parikka has become known for the television series Salatut elämät, in which she began filming in late 2007. Parika's character Peppi Puolakka came on screen in May 2008. Already a year earlier, Parikka had applied for the role of Oona Kiviranta in the series, which was given to Sara Lohiniva. She first left the series in 2014, but returned for a moment in the Spring and November 2015. The next time she left was in the Spring of 2016, after being on maternity leave. She returned again in November 2017, but left the series altogether with her last episode being aired on 1 May 2019.

In the Summer of 2010, Parikka starred in the play Kuningasjätkä at the Karstula Summer Theater. Based on the series Salatut elämät, a film called Nightmare – painajainen merellä was shot in the Summer of 2012, starring Parikka. The film was awarded the Jussi Awards for Best Film of the Year. Parikka also portrayed Puolakka in the sequel to the film, Nightmare 2 – Painajainen jatkuu, which was released in December 2014.

== Other work ==
In August 2009, Parikka published a book called "Teinistä tähdeksi – Kuinka Sarasta tuli Peppi". The book, published by WSOY, tells about Parikka's first year in Salatut elämät and the challenges it brings. In 2018, Parikka wrote the book "365. Ilon ja inspiraation vuosi.", published by WSOY. In March 2021, WSOY published "Itse tehty – opas omannäköiseen työelämään".

She also writes a blog bearing her own name in Anna magazine.

== Personal life ==
Parikka enrolled as a student at Porkkalan lukio (Porkkala High School) in the Spring of 2009. She has acted in theater and is actively involved in dancing and singing. She is from Kirkkonummi.

Parikka is married to Mikko Parikka, who also starred in Salatut elämät, and they live in their own log cabin in Espoo. The couple's first daughter Matilda was born in March 2014. The couple's second daughter Mimosa was born in December 2015 their third daughter Melina in March 2020 and their son in autumn of 2025.

== Filmography ==
=== Film ===
Year	Title	Role
2012	Nightmare – painajainen merellä	Peppi Kuula
2014	Nightmare 2 – painajainen jatkuu	Peppi Kuula

=== Television ===
Year	Title	Role
2008–2014, 2015–2016, 2017–2019	Salatut elämät	Peppi Puolakka
2011–2012	Tuuliranta	Peppi Puolakka
