= Janne Kuusi =

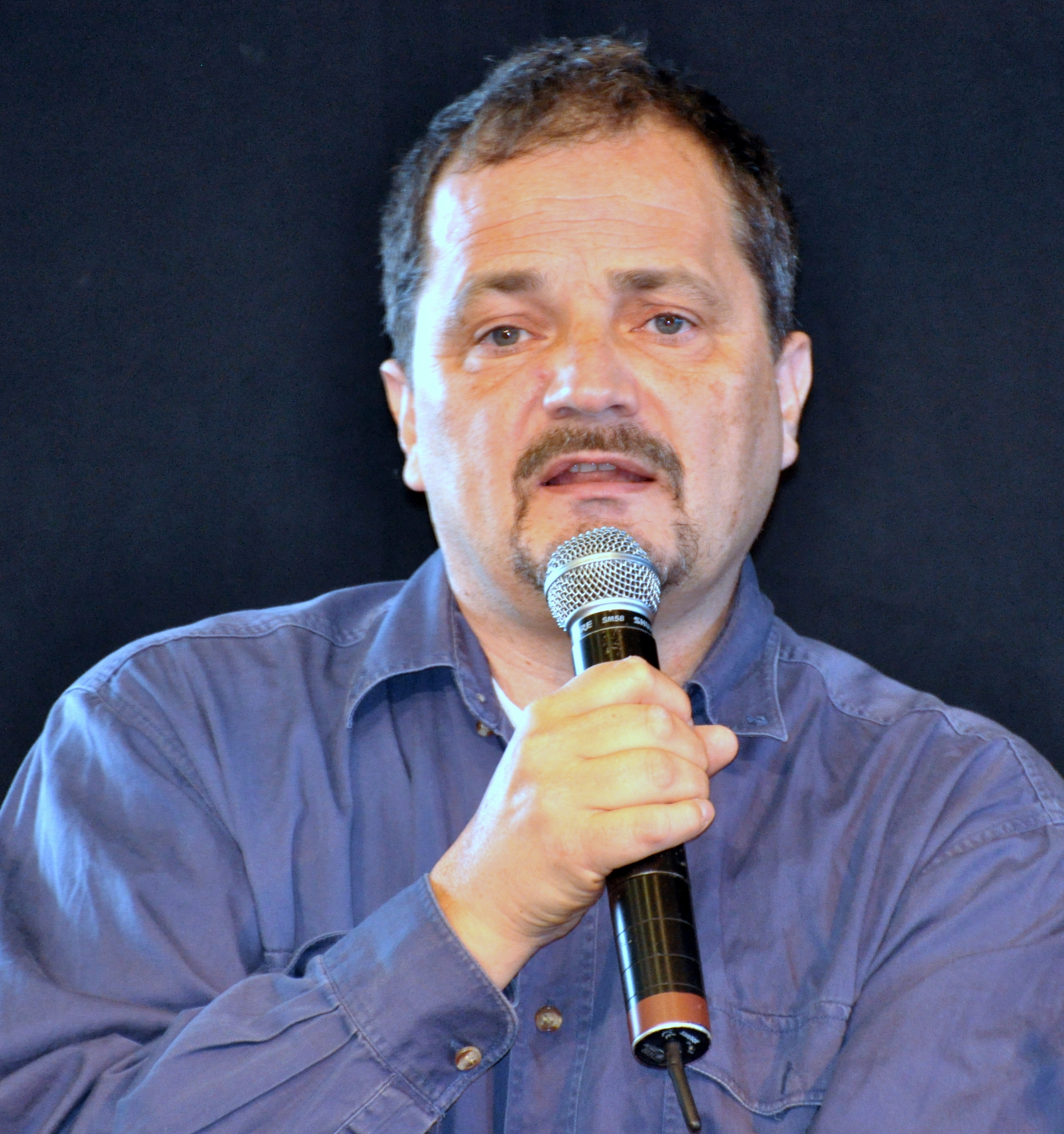
- Born: 29 April 1954 (age 70); Helsinki, Finland
- Occupation(s): film director, screenwriter, producer, actor

Janne Tapio Kuusi (born 29 April 1954 in Helsinki, Finland) is a Finnish television and film director, screenwriter, producer and occasional actor.

== Career ==
Directing since 1980 Kuusi has worked mostly on television in Finland although he has directed several feature films, short fictions and documentaries. His last film direction in 2011 was Bohemian Eyes, a documentary film on Aki Kaurismäki's star actor Matti Pellonpää. After 2006 he has concentrated to writing; his first novel Vapaus ("Freedom") was published in 2010 and sixth one 400 kekkosta in 2022.

== Filmography ==
- Laki jota ei ole/The un-existing Law, 1979, a TV documentary (20 min) director, editor
- Prologi/The Prologue, 1980, a 30-min. fiction. Writer, director, editor, producer
- Läpimurto/The Breakthrough, 1981, a 45 min. fiction. Writer together with J. Tommola, director
- Parveke/Le Balcon/The Balcony, 1982, a TV-play (140 min) adaptation from the play by Jean Genet and direction together with A. af Hällström
- Apinan vuosi/The Year of the Ape, 1983, a 90-min. fiction. Writer together with H. Sirola, director.
- Lapsilta kielletty/Forbidden from Children, 1984, a TV-series (6 x 30 min, fiction). Writer together with T. Eränkö, director
- Laulu/A Song, 1985, a 75-min. documentary. Direction together with A. af Hällström
- Älä itke Iines/Gone with the Mind, 1987, a 90-min. fiction. Producer, writer and director
- Onnea matkaan/Pleasant Journey!, 1988, a 40 min. TV-film (fiction) written by J. Kylätasku. Director.
- Fyysillinen henkilö/A Physical Person, 1988, a 30-min. TV play. Writer together with T. Eränkö, director.
- 88, 1989, a 40-min. documentary. Direction together with T.Turkki, editor.
- Valkoinen nainen/The White Female, 1989, a 100-min. TV-film (fiction). Writer together with J. Kylätasku, director
- Valehtelu virkistää/Refreshing Lies, 1990, a 6 x 25 min TV-series (fiction), written by M. Ahola. Dramaturgist and director
- 99,5 °C – Sydänkohtauksia/Heart Attacks, 1991, a 30-min. TV-film (fiction). Writer and director.
- Toinen luonto/The Endless Head, 1992, a 60-min. TV-film (fiction). Writer, director and editor.
- Mikroaika/Micro Time, 1992, a 6-min. fiction. Writer, director, editor and producer.
- Tuliainen/The Gift, 1993, a 25-min. fiction. Writer together with H. Vuento, director
- Meno-Paluu/There and Back, 1994, a 13-min. fiction. Writer and director.
- Let's Play Zeus, 1995, a 30-min. fiction, written by A. Bardy and A. Karumo. Director.
- Estimated Time of Arrival, 1996, a 30-min. fiction, written by A. Bardy and A. Karumo. Director.
- Hotelli Voodoo/Hotel Voodoo, 1997, a 47-min musical fiction for TV, written by H. Nurmio. Director and producer.
- Jäppinen, 1997, a 25 min TV-fiction, written by O. Nyytäjä. Director and producer.
- Vapaa Pudotus/The Free Fall, 2000–02, developing a new method of using improvisation with actors in screenwriting and filmmaking. Result: a 10 x 45 min series of TV-films. Director (7/10), writer with A. Salmenperä and actor group Stella Polaris, Helsinki
- Kukkia ja Sidontaa/Flowers and Binding, 2004, a 107 min fiction and 5 x 45 min TV-miniseries. Writer together with A. Bardy and actor group Stella Polaris, director
- Saippuaprinssi/The Prince of Soap, 2006, a 95 min fiction, written by A. Bardy. Director.
- Boheemi elää/Bohemian Eyes, 2011, a 75 min documentary on actor Matti Pellonpää. Director.
