= Olga Heikkala =

Finnish actress and singer (born 2000)

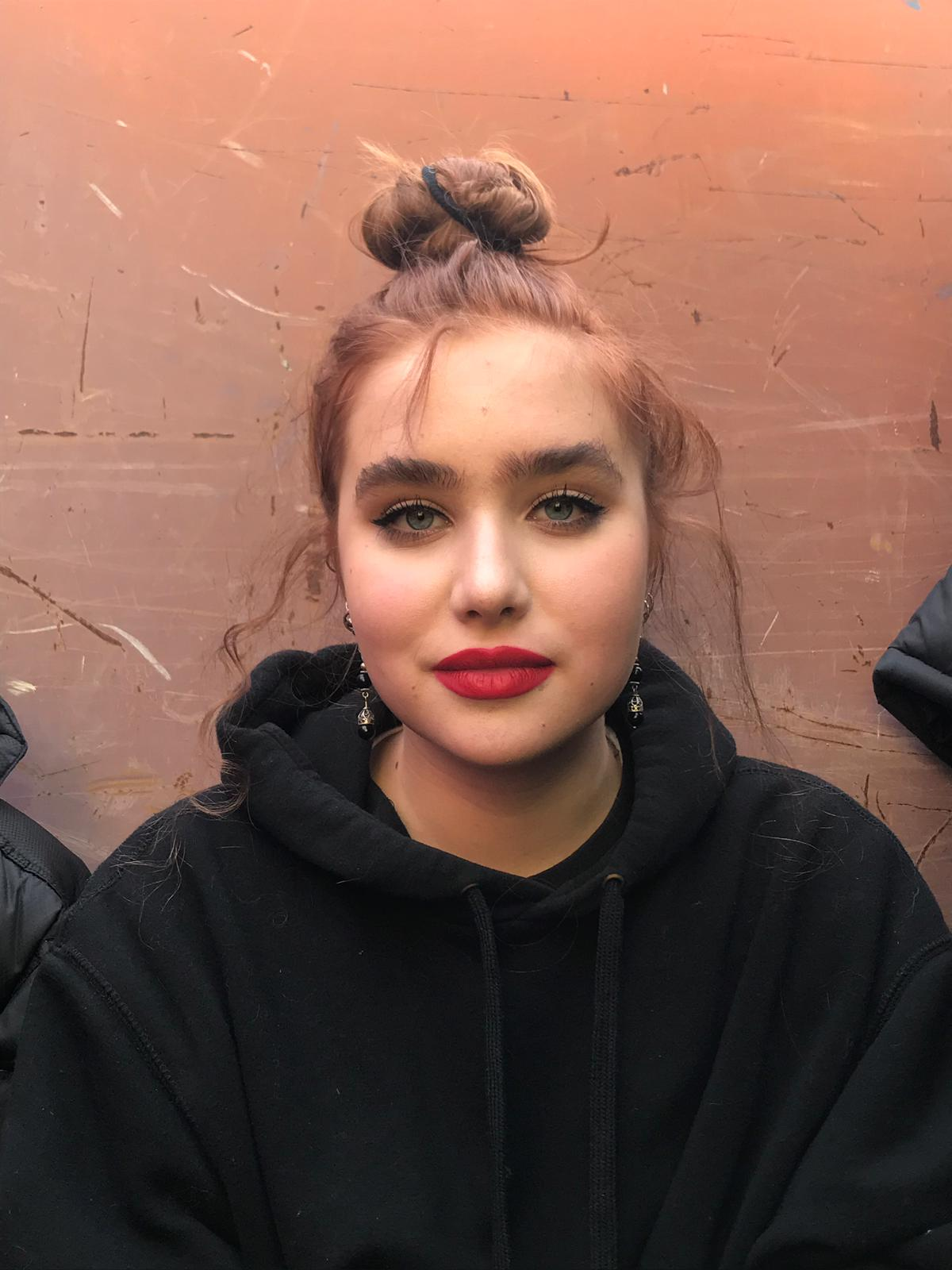
- Heikkala in 2019
- Born: Olga Iita Mirjam Heikkala; 26 April 2000 (age 25); Tornio, Finland
- Occupations: Actress; singer
- Years active: 2013–present
- Musical career
- Instrument: Vocals

Olga Iita Mirjam Heikkala (born 26 April 2000) is a Finnish actress and singer.

Heikkala became famous for the KIDSing singing competition shown on the MTV3 channel in 2013, in which she participated when she was 12 years old. She progressed in the competition until the final, but in the end Jenni Jaakkola won the competition. Between 2018 and 2023, Heikkala played the character of Mira Angervuo in the soap opera Salatut elämät, where she first acted occasionally from late spring 2018 to the end of the same year. Her character returned to the series again in the summer of 2019 and appeared regularly in the series until November 2023.

In 2016, Heikkala moved to Helsinki after getting to study at Kallio high school.

In 2024, Heikkala began her career as a singer under the stage name Olga (stylized in all caps). She released her debut single "Uus bitch" in March 2024 and reached number one on the Finnish Spotify Top 50 list in April. Her second single "Stadi (Alicia)" was released in June 2024, the single features a guest appearance by Finnish singer Isac Elliot.

== Filmography ==
| Year | Title | Role |
|---|---|---|
| 2018–2023 | Salatut elämät | Mira Angervuo |

== Discography ==
=== Singles ===
| Title | Year | Peak chart positions | Albums |
| Title | Year | FIN | Albums |
|---|---|---|---|
| "Uus Bitch" | 2024 | 1 | |
| "Stadi (Alicia)" (feat. Isac Elliot) | 2024 | 5 | |
