= Prisons (film) =

2024 Finnish film by Esa Jussila

- Film poster
- Directed by: Esa Jussila
- Written by: Esa Jussila; Davy Ostermaa; Ari Savonen
- Produced by: Esa Jussila; Matti Rego; Ari Savonen; Minja Tuomisalo
- Starring: Jere Saarela; Ari Savonen; Jarmo Pukkila; Katriina Rajaniemi; Gareth Lawrence
- Cinematography: Esa Jussila
- Edited by: Esa Jussila
- Music by: Jussi Huhtala
- Production company: TR Production
- Distributed by: Bright Fame Pictures
- Release date: February 9, 2024
- Country: Finland
- Languages: English; Finnish

Prisons (stylized as (Pri)sons) is a 2024 Finnish action- splatter horror film written and directed by Esa Jussila. The film tells of a group of criminals who must team up with each other to fight for their lives when a top-secret underworld trading post comes under attack by bloodthirsty hitmen.

The film has been marketed as the "most violent film of Finland". Film director Jussila has said that his film is "a mixture of two film genres, action films with extreme horror, been practically one big love letter not only to genre classics, but also to exploitation films that could be found in the more dubious corners of video rental shops and on the prohibited lists of the film inspectorate." According to Jussila, who has become known in underground culture for his smaller cult films, like Goremageddon (2011), Goremadeddon 2 (2017) and The Pussy with an Uzi (2021), Prisons is his most ambitious directing work. In his opinion, the film is exceptional in Finland due to its violence, effects and stunt choreography performed by the actors.

The film premiered on 9 February 2024.

== Cast ==
- Jere Saarela as Juha Kaivola
- Ari Savonen as Mikael Lind
- Jarmo Pukkila as Nico Lind
- Katriina Rajaniemi as Jessica
- Gareth Lawrence as Barrett
- Veera W. Vilo as Koch
- Ilkka Koivula as Jon Lind
- Sami Huhtala as Daniel
- Markus Tilli as Timi
- Karoliina Blackburn as Madame
