= Oona Louhivaara =

Finnish actress (born 1987)

- Born: Oona Verona Louhivaara; 29 October 1987 (age 38); Helsinki, Finland
- Years active: 2002–present

Oona Verona Louhivaara (born 29 October 1987, Helsinki) is a Finnish actress. From 2007 to 2009 she appeared as Juulia Autio on the popular Finnish soap opera Salatut Elämät. She is also known for the youth-oriented television series Laura, which aired on YLE TV2. The show aired for three seasons, which were titled Laura, Laura at Summer Camp and Laura in the City. In 2001 Louhivaara acted in the film Kyytiä Moosekselle, the script of which was written by 12- to 15-year-olds.
