= Maija-Liisa Peuhu =

Finnish actress (born 1942)

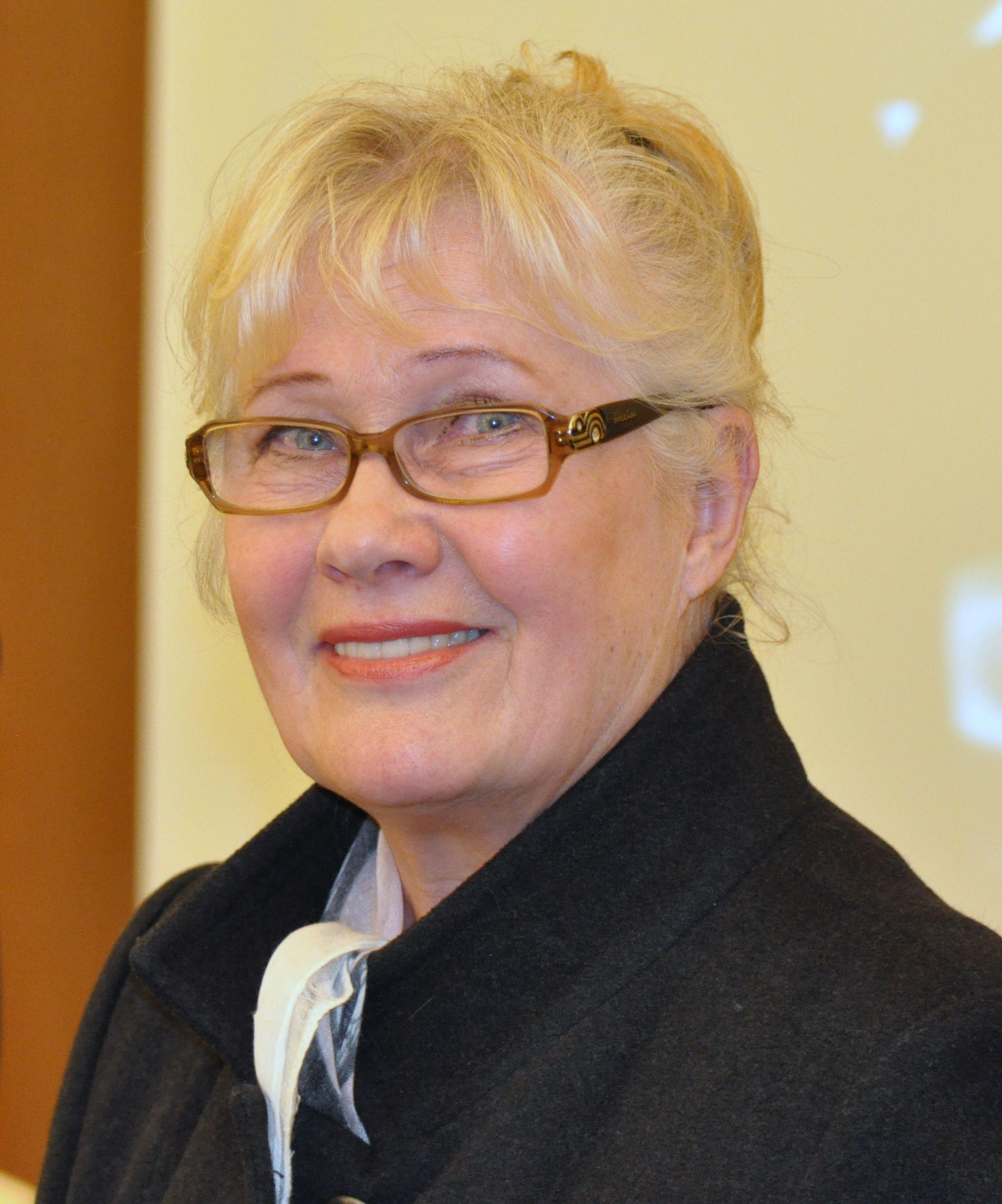
- Maija-Liisa Peuhu in 2012.
- Born: 20 January 1942 (age 84); Kuusankoski, Finland

Maija-Liisa Peuhu (born 20 January 1942 in Kuusankoski, Finland) is a Finnish actress. She is famous for the half-hour soap opera Salatut elämät, where she played Ulla Taalasmaa. She has a theatrical background and has played in many other television shows, too. She's been in Salatut elämät from 1999 to 2007, briefly in 2010 and again since 2013. She left the series in summer 2020 due to the COVID-19 pandemic, because she was over 70 years so she could not participate in filming. She briefly reprised her role via a video call in January 2021.
