= Esko Kovero =

Finnish actor

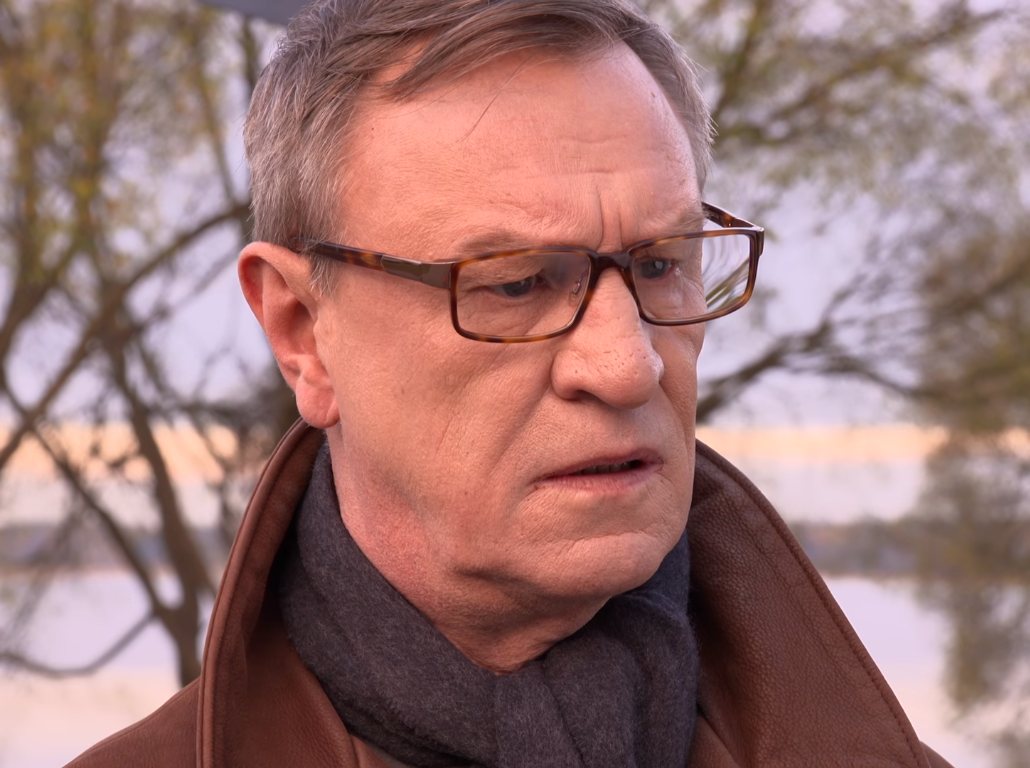
- Kovero as Ismo Laitela in the soap opera Salatut elämät
- Born: February 18, 1958 (age 67); Kuusjärvi, Finland
- Occupation: Actor

Esko Kovero (born 18 February 1958, in Kuusjärvi) is a Finnish actor. He is best known as Ismo Laitela in the Finnish soap opera Salatut elämät (1999–), but he has also appeared in movies and the theatre.

Kovero graduated from the Helsinki Theatre Academy in 1983.

== Filmography ==
- Kiljusen Herrasväki - Police (1981)
- Sadetanssi (1983)
- Talvisota - Juho Pernaa (1989)
- Enkelipeli (1986)
- Elämän suola - Markku Pohjonen (1 episode, 1996)
- Salatut elämät (1999–) – Ismo Laitela (1999–present)
- Pako punaisten päämajasta - Haapalainen (2000)
- Thilia Thalia (2 episodes, 2002)
- Leikin varjolla (1 episode, 2006)
- Satula - Jorma (Salatut elämät spinoff - Web Series) (2015)
