= Jarmo Koski =

Finnish actor (born 1951)

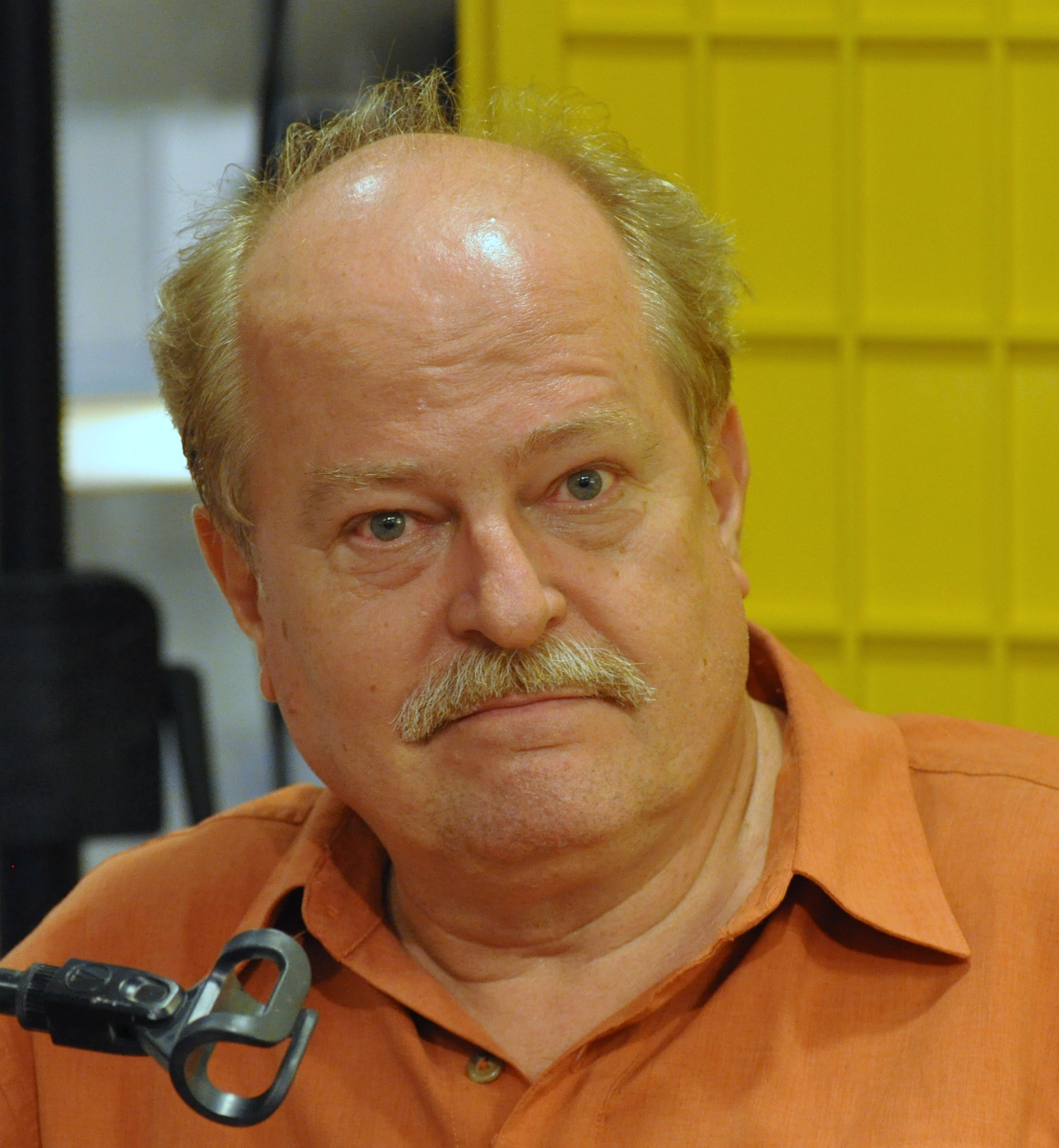
- Born: 2 July 1951 (age 74); Imatra, Finland
- Occupations: Actor, voice actor, writer
- Years active: 1979–present

Jarmo Koski (2 July 1951 in Imatra, South Karelia) is a Finnish actor. He starred as Seppo Taalasmaa in the half-hour soap opera Salatut Elämät from 1999 to 2013 and briefly in 2017 and from 2020 to 2021.

== Dubbed movies, Finnish voice ==
He's also a voice actor for children cartoons and animated movies:

- Shrek 2 and Shrek the Third as King Harold
- A Bug's Life as Heimlich
- Alfred J. Kwak
- Various Winnie the Pooh films and series as Winnie the Pooh (Nalle Puh) since the early 1990s
- The Toy Story franchise as Slinky
- Teletubbies as Tinky Winky (Tiivi-Taavi)
- Nick Knatterton as Narrator
- Blinky Bill as Mayor Pelican and other characters
