= Sami Uotila (actor) =

Finnish male actor (born 1971)

- Born: 1971 (age 53–54); Finland

Sami Uotila (born 1971) is a Finnish male actor, who is known best as Aki Nikkinen from the Finnish TV-series Salatut elämät on MTV3.

He has also acted in the Municipal Theatre of Helsinki, in plays such as Housut pois and Poika ja tähti. In addition he has lent his voice to a few cartoon films. Uotila has played Danny in the Grease musical directed by Marco Bjurström in year 2002. Uotila spent the summer of 2003 in Turku and worked in the play Oklahoma in the Summer Theatre of Samppalinna. In 2006 Uotila gave the Finnish language voice to Lighting McQueen in the animated cartoon film Cars. Uotila stopped shooting episodes of Salatut elämät in 2001, but his character remained on screen until 2002 and later in 2014.

== Filmography ==
- Salatut elämät (1999) – Aki Nikkinen (1999–2002, 2014–)
- Veera (1998)
- Porträttet: Asko Sarkola - skådespelare och teaterchef (2005)
- Thilia Thalia (2 episodes, 2002)
- BumtsiBum! (1 episode, 2002)
