= Jarmo Lehtinen (commentator) =

Finnish sports journalist

Jarmo Lehtinen is a Finnish sports commentator and journalist who works for Finland's National Broadcasting Company YLE. He commentates sports events, mainly football matches, for both radio and television. He regularly commentates football for the Jalkapallokierros program in Radio Suomi. He has also commentated televised football like UEFA Champions League and UEFA Cup matches. He also works as a sportsreader in Urheiluradio, the sports news program for Radio Suomi.
