= Sanna Luostarinen =

Finnish actress

- Born: 26 October 1976 (age 48); Imatra, Finland
- Years active: 1999–2008

Sanna Luostarinen (born 26 October 1976 in Imatra) is a Finnish former actress. Luostarinen has graduated of a commercial institute in the year 1995. She has acted for five years in the Teatteri Violetti in Hyvinkää as well as appeared in television commercials and minor TV-roles.

She is known for the role of Elina Taalasmaa in the Finnish soap series Salatut elämät of MTV3. She played the role from 1999 to 2006 and autumn 2007 to 2008.

Luostarinen gave up acting and retired from public life after leaving Salatut elämät.
