= List of Blinky Bill characters =

This is a list of characters in media related to Blinky Bill, an anthropomorphic koala and fictional children's character created in the 1930s by Australian author and illustrator Dorothy Wall.

== Characters in the TV series ==
- Blinky Bill – A young koala who is very mischievous and cocky. He is the leader of his gang of friends.
- Nutsy – A young kind female koala. She lives on her own for most of the first season, but reunites with her father near the end. In the season one finale, her father marries Blinky's mother and she becomes Blinky's stepsister.
- Flap – A platypus, one of Blinky's best friends and has a large appetite.
- Splodge – A youthful kangaroo, and is the largest and strongest member of Blinky's gang.
- Marcia – A hot-tempered marsupial mouse who considers herself to be brave and tough, and is quick to pick a fight.
- Mayor Pelican – The town's pompous, unhelpful mayor. He wears a purple top hat, medal, a dickie with a bow tie, and glasses.
- Miss Magpie – The town's school teacher. She wears a black mortarboard hat and glasses.
- Mrs. Koala – Blinky's mother. She marries Nutsy's father and becomes Nutsy's stepmother. She wears a pink dress. She is constantly bossy, strict, and responsible towards her son Blinky because of his misbehaving, except in the CGI series.
- Mr. Koala – Nutsy's long-lost father. He marries Blinky's mother and becomes Blinky's stepfather. He wears a blue shirt and black pants in the 2004 TV series.
- Mrs. Platypus – Flap's mother. She wears a pink dress and a white bonnet.
- Mr. Platypus – Flap's father. He wears glasses (in seasons one & two), a brown shirt, and brown trousers.
- Mrs. Meryl Rabbit – A Greenpatch resident and mother of many children. She wears a lilac dress and an apron.
- Mr. Bobbin Rabbit – Mrs. Rabbit's husband and father of many children. He wears a yellow hat, a yellow singlet, green pants and speaks with a Yorkshire accent.
- Granny Grunty Koala – An elderly koala who is hard of hearing. She wears glasses and a blue shawl.
- Ma Dingo – The bad-tempered mother of Danny, Meatball, Daisy, and Shifty. She wears a yellow dress and a green headscarf.
- Danny Dingo – A suave, smug dingo who wears sunglasses. He usually comes up with schemes to scam the townspeople.
- Meatball Dingo – A fat, unintelligent, but strong dingo.
- Daisy Dingo – A vain, flirtatious female dingo who wishes for fame.
- Shifty Dingo – Kind-hearted, sensitive, and the youngest member of the Dingo family. At first, he's an enemy of Blinky's gang, along with the rest of his family, but befriends them after helping find Nutsy's father and becomes a member of Blinky's gang at the end of season 1.
- Mrs. Kangaroo – Splodge's mother. She wears a light pink dress with a flower on her hat.
- Mr. Kangaroo – Splodge's father. He wears a red hat, light blue shirt, dark blue pants, and brown shoes.
- Mrs. Marsupial Mouse – Marcia's mother. She wears a pink dress, purple shoes, and glasses.
- Mr. Marsupial Mouse – Marcia's father. He wears a white vest, red pants, and glasses.
- Mrs. Spotty – A Greenpatch resident and mother of six children, who is a frog. She wears a yellow dress.
- Mr. Gloop – An emu who runs the local cafe. He wears an orange shirt. He and his family gulp during their dialogue.
- Ms. Glennys Pimm – A woman who runs a shop in the bush and is not particularly fond of koalas. She has a pet budgie named Cedric.
- Cedric – Ms. Pimm's snooty budgie, who refers to her as "Big Nose".

== Characters in Dorothy Wall's books ==
- Reverend Fluffy Ears – A male koala and Mrs. Koala's cousin.
- Snubby – A young male koala and Mrs. Grunty's son.
- Bobbin – A young female rabbit.
- Bunchy – A young male rabbit.
- Brer Rabbit – A male rabbit, Bobbin and Bunchy's father.
- Madame Hare – A female hare.
- Walter Wombat – A male wombat and Mr. Wombat's son.
- Dr. Owl
- Mrs. Field Mouse
- Mrs. Porcupine

== Characters in The New Adventures of Blinky Bill ==
- Eric Echidna
- Kerry Koala – Blinky's twin sister.
- Charlie Goanna
- Sybella Snake
- Ranger Barry

== New characters in Blinky Bill: The Mischievous Koala ==
- Harry – A fat woodcutter, Joe's boss, Flo's husband, and Clea's father.
- Joe – Harry's assistant.
- Flo – Harry's wife and Clea's mother.
- Clea – Harry and Flo's six-year-old daughter.
- Gumlee – Claire's stuffed toy koala.
- The Frogs

== New characters in The Adventures of Blinky Bill ==
- Myrtle Koala – Blinky's shallow, materialistic classmate and Nutsy's rival. She is a koala girl who wears a red dress and a red bow. She initially has a very obvious crush on Blinky (that heavily annoys Nutsy) until, while saving her from a fire, he accidentally gets her dress muddy. Her shallowness and her materialistic nature drive her to get over her crush on him immediately after.
- Algenon Arkwright – A little koala boy who came to Greenpatch. He plays the violin and Blinky changed his identity with him ala The Prince and the Pauper.
- Mr. Possum
- Wendy – A little girl who got lost in the wilderness and was found by Blinky and his gang, who later attempted to teach her to mimic their animal species.
- Twiggy – A little echidna who got lost once.
- Mrs. Echidna – Twiggy's mother.
- Mr. Bill Koala – Blinky's biological father, seen in flashbacks. He apparently died of an illness.
- Madam Wu – A panda similar to Ling Ling from the series' third season. She lives in a zoo and Flap once fell in love with her.
- Mimi – A beige koala who lives in a zoo. She covered for Madam Wu during her temporary escape.
- The King – An orangutan who lives in a zoo.

== New characters in Blinky Bill's Extraordinary Excursion ==
- Dr. Spoonbill – A yellow-billed spoonbill who is the town's doctor. He speaks with a German accent.
- Mr. Echidna
- Mrs. Echidna – An echidna who is not fond of Blinky's mischievous behavior. She wears a blue headscarf and a pink dress.
- Goanna – The crook at the beginning of the quest when Blinky and his friends sneaked into the cavern. He tried to stop them from escaping by doing spooky things but they escaped by mine cart.
- Slick – A ring tailed possum who Blinky and his friends met when they were taken to the city. They later met him at a town with no humans. He wears a yellow shirt and talks like Eddie Murphy. This character is reused (design and voice) as Pos for Skippy: Adventures in Bushtown.
- The Owl Family – Owls who Blinky met while it snowed in the wilderness they travel through.
- Boris – A polar bear who came from Siberia and lives at a circus.
- Mr. Penguin – A little blue penguin. Blinky met him in a Lighthouse.
- The Plovers – Birds who had their nest stolen.
- Hank – A lizard whose parents were taken by smugglers.
- Neil and Christopher
- Cyril – A freshwater crocodile who wears a pink cap and pink tank top.
- Rod, Wayne and Duart – Cyril's three older brothers.
- Cyril, Rod, Wayne and Duart's mother and father – The parents of Cyril, Rod, Wayne and Duart. The four crocodiles' mother wears a lady's hat and dress and the four crocodile's father wears an orange tank top and a pair of shorts with a belt.
- Other crocodiles – Freshwater crocodiles (three of which include Cyril's older brothers) who are trained for the Iron Croc Contest.
- Wallace and George – Two feral pigs who fooled Blinky by pretending to be a monster.
- Numbat Family – Two numbats who invited Blinky to stay with them for the night.
- Cockatoo – A grumpy sulphur-crested cockatoo who is not fond of Blinky after he ruined his tail and followed him around back to Greenpatch.
- Amy
- Puppy
- Mr. Bower Bird – A satin bowerbird who stole blue-coloured objects from everyone else to decorate his bower and entice a girl.
- Dr. Beamstock and Mrs. Universe:
- Mrs. Skewer
- Suki
- Captain Possum
- Arthur – A man who starts dating Ms. Pym. He also owns a budgie; a female named Gwendolyn.
- Gwendolyn – A female budgie owned by Arthur and becomes Cedric's girlfriend.
- Hotel director

== New characters in Blinky Bill’s Extraordinary Balloon Adventure ==
=== Main ===
- Slippery – A big Weddell seal who can be a bit clumsy. Tico wanted him to go home first to Antarctica because he always gets squashed by him. He was caught on a boat with a wolf figurehead. He wears a green and purple swimsuit.
- Leo – An elderly African lion. At the circus, he was fierce with his false teeth, but at other times shows his cowardly side. He was caught by poachers and sold to the Circus Bros. In the African Plains (where he came from), he is rejected until he proves his worthiness. He wears purple pants. He was the second to go home.
- Ling-Ling – A young wise giant panda. She always remembers her master's wisdom. She is good at magic and is very helpful. She wears a light blue jacket. She was the third to go home.
- Yoyo – A South Indian monkey who was born in captivity and became parentless and thus has no idea of his origin. He loves to play pranks and sometimes causes trouble. After much exploration around the world, he finally finds his family in India who are Temple Guardians of the Forbidden Temple. He wears yellow-green pants with yellow-green suspenders. He was the fourth to go home.
- Penelope Poodle – A beautiful French poodle who often worries. She has many precious things. She wears a necklace and a pink tutu, but in India, she has a red bindi on her forehead, a purple skirt, and a sari. She once lived with a human in Paris who she calls a Mistress. She was accidentally sold to the Circus Bros. as a puppy. She was the last to go home.
- Circus Brothers – Two human brothers named Basil and Cyril who are main antagonists of the series and the leaders of the circus with the mistreated animals. They chase Blinky around the world to catch him and his friends. They believe Blinky will be the star who'll make them rich after seeing him on the trapeze which he grabbed by accident. Basil is the ringmaster, who is overweight and has long black hair tied in a ponytail and a mustache. He wears a black top hat, a black coat, a white shirt, navy-coloured pants. Cyril is the clown who wears clown makeup (which he is seen without after the circus was stolen), blue dungarees, a white shirt, and has ginger-coloured hair. At the end of each episode, Basil accuses Cyril for failure. In the final episode, however, Cyril reforms and assists the fire brigade in saving Greenpatch, before forcing his brother into retirement.
- Tico Toucan – A grumpy miniature toucan who works for the Circus Bros. and befriends Blinky and his friends. He is often the cause of the things that happen to the balloon. He tries to help the Circus Bros. catch the animals but Blinky doesn't know about that until they reach the Amazon jungle. He originally did come from the Amazon with the other toucans, he decided to stay with the crew feeling that he didn't fit in with the other toucans despite being welcomed by them. In India, he became the ringmaster and manager of a performing bear, mongoose and rat.

=== Minor characters who Blinky met on the journey ===
==== Antarctica ====
- Slippery's Family – A colony of Weddell seals, one of who was Slippery's mother.
- Skipper the Scurvy – A human who caught Slippery on a boat with a wolf-like figurehead. He went with the Circus Bros. to Antarctica to catch Slippery's family. He wears an eye patch and has a peg leg.
- Penguin Colony – A family of the Baby Penguin that considered Flap to be his mother and followed him around. He took him home to his real mother, Norma.

==== African Plains ====
- Rex – Leo's Son, King of the Mumbada Pride. He wears light brown shorts with a belt.
- Claude – Rex's Son and Leo's Grandson. He wears a blue vest.
- The Poachers – Men who caught Leo and convinced the Circus Bros. to bring them a lion cub.
- Chimpanzees – A group of chimps who Yoyo thought was his family.
- Ostrich Pride – Ostriches who had their feathers plucked by humans. At first, Blinky was rude towards them, and they later help the crew get Penelope's diamond bracelet back from the Bros.
- Twigger – A giraffe who Blinky met while running away from his friends after thinking that they forgot his birthday. She was caught by Poachers. She took Blinky back to his friends. She wears a light-blue bandana.
- Nene and Dubaku – Giraffes who are part of Twigger's herd.
- Expert Game Trackers – Two humans who the Circus Bros. travel with. They put them in a crate and stored them on a ship.
- Elephant – An African elephant who borrowed the caravan to take her sick calf to some grass with help of the crew.
- Kiku – The Elephant's sick calf.

==== China ====
- Hugh – A human boy who took Flap to be his servant temporarily at the farm with his mother.
- The Master – Ling-Ling's master. He was put in a cage in a human town but freed by the crew. He wears robes.
- The Panda Colony – Ling-Ling's Family.
- Ah-Phat – A weasel who tries to help the Bros. catch the animals and takes Tico's job. She wears a blue shirt and a hat. She was soon fired after losing the animals.
- The Mountain Guardians – Other Pandas who let Ling-Ling and her family share their home.

==== Amazon Jungle ====
- Anna – An anaconda who is afraid of water, ever since she was young. She was in the Caravan with the crew. She saved Blinky when Basil pulled him out of the Caravan and into the water. She even saved the caravan from going over a waterfall.
- 'Coco Phil – A howler monkey who resembles Blinky. He has two yellow buttons instead of one.
- Sophia – Coco's adoptive sister who resembles Nutsy. She wears a pink dress and a yellow bandana.
- Leafpatchers – South American animals who resemble the Greenpatchers. Coco has four unmentioned friends who are a sloth (similar to Flap), an anteater (similar to Splodge, but wearing a blue shirt), a guinea pig (similar to Marcia) and a jaguar (similar to Shifty). Others include a jaguar family similar to the Dingo Family, an alligator similar to Ruff, an iguana similar to Mrs. Spotty, an Andean condor similar to Mr. Gloop, a peccary similar to Nurse Angelina, an Amazon turtle similar to Ms. Echidna, a Chilean flamingo similar to Mr. Gloop, and a hare similar to Mrs. Rabbit. Their names are unknown.
- Miss Egret – A Leafpatch resident similar to Miss Magpie.
- Mr. Arnold Armadillo (nicknamed "Armo" by Coco and his friends) – A Leafpatch resident similar to Mr. Wombat.
- Mayor Macaw – The mayor of Leafpatch similar to Mayor Pelican. He wears a black bow tie and a black top hat.
- Macko – A Leafpatch resident similar to Jacko, but is a toucan. Mayor Macaw mistook Tico for him and asked him to help out for the unveiling ceremony.
- Toucans – Toucans whom Tico originally lived with. Two of them are named Pippo and Raul. Raul is usually clumsy. They were caught in cages but freed by Tico. Pippo wears a purple bandana and Raul wears a blue bandana.
- Environmentalists – Two English-American humans, male and female, who cured Penelope from the Purple Devil. They asked where Yoyo came from. They are similar to Ms. Pym with a pet canary similar to Cedric.

==== India ====
- Jugglers – A sloth bear named Majid, a mongoose named Alsanna and a rat named Sanjay. Tico became their ringmaster and manager.
- Mr. Rajid – A man who caught Yoyo and put him with the Jugglers. He steals people's wallets, and after he gets exposed by Blinky, he is chased by the villagers.
- The Tiger – A Bengal tiger who is the mother of a tiger cub named Sondeya who was trapped under some wood. Flap freed Sondeya by digging her out.
- Rami – An Indian elephant who was in the town of Chandipur. He took the Circus Bros. there. He warned Penelope about the Forbidden temple. At the end, as he, his human Gupta, and the snake charmer meet with the Circus Bros. he trumpets loudly with his trunk at the Bros and stomps after one of them.
- Temple Guardians – Monkeys who are Yoyo's family. They guard the Forbidden Temple.

==== Paris ====
- Mistress – A woman who Penelope lives with.
- Fifi – A cat who the Mistress bought while Penelope was gone.
- Maurice – A brown poodle who helped Penelope for her necklace. He wears a white suit. He was mean to Penelope, Blinky, Nutsy, and Flap and everyone.
- Phoebe LaFoo – A woman who made Blinky a model named Monsieur B.B. It got Blinky brainwashed about his feelings of the bush. Blinky then rescued Nutsy and Flap from the Bros. and regained his memory. She is equally as selfish as Basil.
- Policeman – A policeman who arrested the Bros. for barging into the Studio.
- Flight Attendant – A flight attendant who was on the plane with Blinky, Nutsy and Flap back to Australia after the Eiffel Tower tore the balloon and their caravan smashed to the ground.

==== Sea (never seen by Blinky, but they were with the Bros.) ====
- Sailor – A man who was with the Bros. on a sailing boat until they got on a ship.
- 'Ship's Captain – A man who was on the ship with the Bros. until they got away by helicopter.
- Captain – Another captain of a different ship who gave Cyril a time limit to bring the animals to him. The Bros. got into trouble for breaking his helicopter.

== New characters in Blinky Bill's White Christmas ==
- Angela
- Chopper McGinty
- Sly – Chopper's assistant.
- Buttons – Sly's teddy bear.

== Characters in the CGI series ==
- Blinky Bill – A young koala who is William and Betty's son.
- Betty Bill – Blinky's mother.
- William Bill – Blinky's father.
- Nutsy – A young female koala who is Blinky's closest friend.
- Wombo – A wombat.
- Jacko Browing – A frill-neck lizard who is Blinky's sidekick and best friend.
- Mayor Wilberforce Cranklepot – A tyrannical goanna who is Blinky's nemesis and the mayor of Greenpatch.
- Juan Pablo – A Paraguayan parrot.
- Bandi and Coot – Two mischievous bandicoots.
- Sir Claude – A feral cat and Blinky's other nemesis.
- Eddy – An American squirrel.
- Robert – A lyrebird who is one of Blinky's friends.
- Sugar – A sugar glider who is one of Blinky's friends.
- Spike – An echidna who is one of Blinky's friends.
- Ms. Tibbins – A kiwi bird who is a school teacher.
- San Jorge – A sulphur-crested cockatoo.
- Roddy MacBill – A koala and is Blinky Bill's uncle he plays the bagpipes.
- Bob – A friend of Jacko who was killed by hunters years ago.
- Uncle Jack – A frill-necked lizard and Jacko's uncle.
- Echo – a gecko borrowing Robert's glasses.
- Bluey – A blue footed booby.
- Bell
- Doris Cranklepot – Cranky's mother.
- Whoogle – An owl.
- Kev – A koala who becomes a Guardian of Greenpatch.
- Mr. Owl – Whoogle's father.
- Priscilla – A female frog.
- Midge – A grasshopper.
- Eagle – A wedge-tailed eagle.
- Crocodiles – Saltwater crocodiles.
- Cheryl and Beryl – Twin emu sisters.
