= Tommi Taurula =

Finnish actor

Tommi Taurula (born 7 September 1967 Punkaharju, Finland) is a Finnish actor. He is best known for his role as Kari Taalasmaa in the Finnish television soap opera Salatut elämät, where he returned 24 May 2007. Taurula has also had small roles in Finnish movies.
