= Veikko Kansikas =

Finnish politician (1923–1991)

Veikko Kansikas (24 November 1923, in Kuusankoski – 6 September 1991) was a Finnish plumber and politician. He was a member of the Parliament of Finland from 1959 to 1962, representing the Finnish People's Democratic League (SKDL). Kansikas was the secretary of the Kouvola area organisation of the Communist Party of Finland (SKP).
