= Jarmo Hyttinen =

Finnish actor and screenwriter

- Born: Finland

Jarmo Hyttinen is a Finnish film actor and screenwriter.

Hyttinen began his career in acting in 1993 with one appearance on TV but it wasn't until five years later he appeared in film in 1998 with little or no work in between. Since then he has mostly appeared in Finnish film and has also written a number of TV series and film scripts since 2002. He starred in the 2005 film Paha maa and more recently in the 2006 film Saippuaprinssi in which he worked with actors such as Mikko Leppilampi, Pamela Tola and Teijo Eloranta.

== Filmography ==
Year	Film	Role
2014	Nightmare 2 – painajainen jatkuu	Eino
2006	Saippuaprinssi	Angel
2005	Paha maa	Puti
2004	Kukkia ja sidontaa	Osmo Rauhanen
1998	Fire-Eater	Mies Pubissa
