= Karoliina Blackburn =

Finnish actress and Muay Thai fighter

- Born: 23 November 1972 (age 53); Helsinki, Finland

Karoliina Blackburn (born 23 November 1972) is a Finnish actress and Muay Thai fighter. She is mostly known for her appearance in Star Wreck: In the Pirkinning, a parody scifi fan film (where she was one of only three professional actors in cast), but has also had roles in several big-budget Finnish television series. Karoliina served as the host for Finnish reality TV show Suuri Seikkailu in 2005.

She is also the 2004 Finnish champion in Thai boxing (60 kg women's category).

== Selected filmography ==
- Badding (2000)
- Sincerely Yours in Cold Blood (4 episodes, 2002)
- Game Over (2005)
- Star Wreck: In the Pirkinning (2005)
- Suuri Seikkailu (Finnish reality television series, Karoliina was the show's host)
- Nightmare - painajainen merellä (2012)
- Nightmare 2 - painajainen jatkuu (2014)
- Stop Nyqvist (2022)
- Prisons (TBA)
