= SF Film Finland =

Finnish film distribution company

SF Film Finland Oy
- Formerly: FS Film Oy (2000–2013)
- Type: Subsidiary
- Industry: Film
- Founded: 2000
- Headquarters: Helsinki, Finland
- Revenue: ▲€26,255,000 (2012)
- Net income: ▲€992,000 (2012)
- Owner: Bonnier Group
- Number of employees: 26 (2012)
- Parent: AB Svensk Filmindustri
- Website: sffilm.fi

SF Film Finland Oy (formerly FS Film Oy) is a Finnish film distributor established in 2000. It is part of Bonnier Group and a subsidiary of AB Svensk Filmindustri. SF Film Finland is the leading film distributor in Finland, with market shares of 30.67% in admissions and 31.04% in box office (2011). The company distributes approximately 45 theatrical premieres and 400 new DVD releases annually.
