= One-Way Ticket to Mombasa =

- Directed by: Hannu Tuomainen
- Written by: Atro Lahtela; Hannu Tuomainen
- Produced by: Risto Nikkilä; Hannu Tuomainen
- Cinematography: Pekka Uotila
- Edited by: Jukka Nykänen
- Music by: Samuli Putro; Martti Salminen
- Production company: Cinemaker Oy
- Distributed by: Columbia TriStar Egmont Film Distributors Oy
- Release date: 2002
- Running time: 108 minutes
- Country: Finland
- Language: Finnish

One-Way Ticket to Mombasa (Menolippu Mombasaan) is a 2002 Finnish film directed by Hannu Tuomainen.

== Plot ==
Pete (played by Antti Tarvainen) is a seventeen-year-old boy who loses his consciousness while playing in a pop band. The diagnosis of cancer is harsh and the doctor cannot say for sure whether Pete will celebrate his 18th birthday. Hospitalized, he meets Jusa (Joonas Saartamo), a "tough guy", cancer patient too. They eventually become friends, after a first moment of clash. One night, encouraged by the vodka on Jusa's 18th birthday, Pete confesses his love to Kata (Johanna Rönnlöf), his dream girl since high school. Jusa and Pete travel to Lapland where Kata has a summer job at her uncle's hotel. In Jusa's wild company, Pete experiences something which he never felt before as they decide to take a trip to Mombasa via Lapland, together with Kata, as this is Jusa's last wish before his inevitable death.

Jusa has sex with Kata to whom he loses his virginity. Pete acquiesces and stays in the red convertible while Jusa and Kata are having a sexual intercourse in a barn. Afterwards Pete joins them and the three spend the night together sleeping in the barn. Jusa will never see the dreamed beach of Mombasa: he dies in the company of Kata and Pete in Finland on the beach by the shiny blue Baltic Sea.

The movie's theme song is "Mombasa" performed by the band Denigrate. The song is a remake of the eponymous 1975 hit performed by Taiska, which is the original Finnish cover of the Italian song "Ibo-le-le".
