= Masked Singer Suomi =

Finnish singing competition television show

- Genre: Reality competition
- Based on: King of Mask Singer by Munhwa Broadcasting Corporation
- Presented by: Ilkka Uusivuori
- Starring: Janne Kataja; Jenni Kokander; Maria Veitola; Christoffer Strandberg
- Country of origin: Finland
- Original language: Finnish
- No. of seasons: 7
- No. of episodes: 81 (+2 specials)

Production
- Running time: 42 minutes
- Production company: FremantleMedia Finland

Original release
- Network: MTV3
- Release: 14 March 2020 – present

Masked Singer Suomi is a Finnish reality singing competition television series based on the Masked Singer franchise which originated from the South Korean version of the show King of Mask Singer. It premiered on MTV3 on 14 March 2020, and is hosted by Ilkka Uusivuori and the panelists are Janne Kataja, Jenni Kokander and Maria Veitola.

The inaugural season premiered in March 2020 and was successful with roughly a million viewers per episode. Season 2 started on 17 October 2020, with new panelist Christoffer Strandberg joining in.

The third season was announced in June 2021, with 16 contestants, with Uusivuori hosting and Kataja, Veitola, Kokander and Strandberg serving as panelists.

== Cast ==
The series has been hosted by Ilkka Uusivuori since Season 1. The Regular panelists have been Janne Kataja, Jenni Kokander and Maria Veitola from Season 1 as well.

In Season 1, there was a changing Guest panelist in each episode. These appearances were made by Tuure Boelius, Krista Siegfrids, Aki Linnanahde, Eicca Toppinen, and many other guests.

In Season 2, Christoffer Strandberg replaced the Guest panelists.

In Season 5, two new panelists were announced: Benjamin Peltonen, who was previously as a guest panelist, and Jenni Poikelus.

In Season 6, in addition to being a guest mask, Mikko Silvennoinen was a guest panelist in episode 10.

In Season 7, Kirsi Alm-Siira was a guest co-host in episode 11.

Host and panel timeline
Cast Member	Position	Seasons						
Cast Member	Position	1 (2020)	2 (2020)	3 (2021)	4 (2022)	5 (2023)	6 (2024)	7 (2025)
Ilkka Uusivuori	Host (1-)	Main	Main	Main	Main	Main	Main	Main
Janne Kataja	Main Panelist (1-)	Main	Main	Main	Main	Main	Main	Main
Jenni Kokander	Main Panelist (1-4)	Main	Main	Main	Main			
Maria Veitola	Main Panelist (1-6)	Main	Main	Main	Main	Main	Main	
Christoffer Strandberg	Main Panellist (2-4)		Main	Main	Main			
Benjamin Peltonen	Guest Panelist (1); Main Panellist (5-)	Guest				Main	Main	Main
Jenni Poikelus	Main Panelist (5-)					Main	Main	Main

== Series overview ==
Series overview
Series	Contestants	Episodes	Originally released		Winner	Runner-up	Third place
Series	Contestants	Episodes	First released	Last released	Winner	Runner-up	Third place
1	12	10	14 March 2020	16 May 2020	Sami Hedberg as "Lion"	Ilkka Alanko as "Haystack"	Erika Vikman as "Wasp"
2	12	10	17 October 2020	19 December 2020	Marko Hietala as "Doctor"	Jarkko Tamminen as "Miss Mouse"	Mikko Leppilampi as "Frost"
3	16	13	28 August 2021	20 November 2021	Anna-Maija Tuokko as "Superhero"	Waltteri Torikka as "Party Panda"	Kasmir as "Raven"
4	14	12	3 September 2022	19 November 2022	Lenni-Kalle Taipale as "Black Sheep"	Tuure Boelius as "Orc"	Nelli Matula as "Hot Dog"
5	14	12	9 September 2023	25 November 2023	Bess as "Hummingbird"	Jarkko Ahola as "Sauna Stove"	Hanna Pakarinen as "Farmer"
6	14	12	31 August 2024	16 November 2024	Atte Kilpinen as "Forest Troll"	Arja Koriseva as "Night & Day"	Erja Lyytinen as "Skeleton"
7	14	12	6 September 2025	22 November 2025	Sebastian Rejman as "Fartman"	Jarkko Tamminen as "Old Man"	Jannika B as "Mermaid"
8	14	TBA	3 October 2026	TBA	TBA	TBA	TBA

=== Season 1 (Spring 2020) ===
The first season of Masked Singer Suomi was aired in spring 2020. Ilkka Uusivuori served as the host, while Janne Kataja, Jenni Kokander and Maria Veitola were the panelists. The guest panelists were (in episode order) Tuure Boelius, Aki Linnanahde, Joonas Nordman, Jufo Peltomaa, Krista Siegfrids, Mikko Kuustonen, Benjamin Peltonen, Eini, Jannika B and Eicca Toppinen.

Sami Hedberg won the Season as "Lion", while Ilkka Alanko, "Haystack" finished as second.

=== Season 2 (Autumn 2020) ===
The second season of Masked Singer Suomi was aired in late autumn 2020, and was hosted by Ilkka Uusivuori. Janne Kataja, Jenni Kokander and Maria Veitola continued as panelists, and Christoffer Strandberg joined them.

Marko Hietala won the Season as "Doctor", while Jarkko Tamminen finished as second with Masked Singer "Miss Mouse".

=== Season 3 (2021) ===
The third season of Masked Singer Suomi was aired in late summer 2021, and was hosted by Ilkka Uusivuori. Janne Kataja, Jenni Kokander, Maria Veitola and Christoffer Strandberg continued as panelists.

Anna-Maija Tuokko won the Season as "Superhero", while Waltteri Torikka finished second as "Party Panda".

=== Season 4 (2022) ===
The fourth season of Masked Singer Suomi was aired in late autumn 2022, and was hosted by Ilkka Uusivuori. Janne Kataja, Jenni Kokander, Maria Veitola and Christoffer Strandberg continued as panelists.

Lenni-Kalle Taipale won the Season as "Black Sheep", while Tuure Boelius finished second as "Orc".

=== Season 5 (2023) ===
The fifth season of Masked Singer Suomi was aired in late autumn 2023, and was hosted by Ilkka Uusivuori. Janne Kataja and Maria Veitola continued as panelists, while Benjamin Pelkonen and Jenni Poikelus joined them.

Bess won the season as "Hummingbird", while Jarkko Ahola finished second as "Sauna Stove".

=== Season 6 (2024) ===
The sixth season of Masked Singer Suomi was aired in late autumn 2024, and was hosted by Ilkka Uusivuori. Janne Kataja, Maria Veitola, Benjamin Pelkonen and Jenni Poikelus continue as panelists.

For the first time in the series, the season featured two themed episodes. The season also includes a Christmas special.

Atte Kilpinen won the season as "Forest Troll", while Arja Koriseva finished second as "Night & Day".

=== Season 7 (2025) ===
The seventh season of Masked Singer Suomi was aired in late autumn 2025, and was hosted by Ilkka Uusivuori. Janne Kataja, Benjamin Pelkonen and Jenni Poikelus continued as panelists. In each episode, there were changing guest panelists who have previously either participated in the competition or performed as a guest. The guest panelists were Mikko Silvennoinen, Viki Eerikkilä and Köpi Kallio, Niko Saarinen, Gogi Mavromichalis, Lenni-Kalle Taipale, Veronica Verho, Atte Kilpinen, Nelli Matula, Paula Noronen, Herbalisti, Kiti Kokkonen, and Sami Hedberg.

The season introduced a button called "Poista maski" ("Remove mask"). If the panelists agree on a character's identity, they can use the button once to reveal them before audience votes. However, if the panelists guess wrong, the character gets an immunity in that episode.

Sebastian Rejman won the season as "Fartman", while Jarkko Tamminen finished second as "Old Man".

=== Season 8 (2026) ===
The eighth season of Masked Singer Suomi is set to air in late autumn 2026. The season will be hosted by Ilkka “Ile” Uusivuori and the regular panelists were Benjamin Peltone, Janne Kataja and Krista Siegfrids, who replaced Jenni Poikelus as a new regular panelist.

The season's guest panelists will include Linnea Leino, Jaakko Parkkali, Arja Koriseva, Marko Anttila, Cristal Snow, Niina Lahtinen, Sami Sykkö, Shirly Karvinen, Ellen Jokikunnas, Bess and Sebastian Rejman. This is the first season of the show to not premiere in late August or early September, similar to the previous six seasons.

== Season 1 ==
Stage name	Celebrity	Occupation	Episodes									
Stage name	Celebrity	Occupation	1	2	3	4	5	6	7	8	9	10
Leijona (Lion)	Sami Hedberg	Comedian		SAFE		SAFE		SAFE	SAFE	SAFE	SAFE	WINNER
Heinäseiväs (Haystack)	Ilkka Alanko	Musician	SAFE		SAFE		SAFE		SAFE	SAFE	SAFE	RUNNER-UP
Ampiainen (Wasp)	Erika Vikman	Singer	SAFE		SAFE		SAFE		SAFE	SAFE	SAFE	THIRD
Peacock (Note: The stage names were in english.)	Pandora	Singer		SAFE		SAFE		SAFE	SAFE	SAFE	OUT	
Kisu (Kitty)	Linda Lampenius	Violinist		SAFE		SAFE		SAFE	SAFE	OUT		
Kana (Chicken)	Viivi Pumpanen	Model	SAFE		SAFE		SAFE		OUT			
Söpö (Cutie)	Sami Uotila	Actor		SAFE		SAFE		OUT				
Hevonen (Horse)	Paleface	Musician	SAFE		SAFE		OUT					
Pupu (Bunny)	Henri Alén	Chef		SAFE		OUT						
Dragon	Sara Chafak	Model	SAFE		OUT							
Alien	Mikael Jungner	Politician		OUT								
Shamaani (Shaman)	Pekka Pouta	Meteorologist	OUT									

The masked singer was safe from elimination.
The masked singer was eliminated from the competition and unmasked upon their elimination.
The masked singer did not perform.

=== Week 1 (14 March) ===
Performances on the first episode
#	Stage name	Song	Identity	Result
1	Haystack	"Freestyler" by Bomfunk MC's	undisclosed	SAFE
2	Dragon	"Beibi" by Haloo Helsinki	undisclosed	SAFE
3	Chicken	"Baby One More Time" by Britney Spears	undisclosed	SAFE
4	Shaman	"Älä droppaa mun tunnelmaa" by Vesala	Pekka Pouta	OUT
5	Horse	"Don't Look Back in Anger" by Oasis	undisclosed	SAFE
6	Wasp	"Believe" by Cher	undisclosed	SAFE

=== Week 2 (21 March) ===
Performances on the second episode
#	Stage name	Song	Identity	Result
1	Peacock	"Amaranth" by Nightwish	undisclosed	SAFE
2	Cutie	"Armo" by Apulanta	undisclosed	SAFE
3	Kitty	"Baden-Baden" by Chisu	undisclosed	SAFE
4	Bunny	"Jykevää on rakkaus" by Ville Valo & The Agents	undisclosed	SAFE
5	Lion	"Con Te Partirò" by Andrea Bocelli	undisclosed	SAFE
6	Alien	"Oi beibi" by Raptori	Mikael Jungner	OUT

=== Week 3 (28 March) ===
Performances on the third episode
#	Stage name	Song	Identity	Result
1	Horse	"Rockstar" by Post Malone and 21 Savage	undisclosed	SAFE
2	Dragon	"Feeling Good" by Anthony Newley	Sara Chafak	OUT
3	Chicken	"Flashdance... What a Feeling" by Irene Cara	undisclosed	SAFE
4	Wasp	"Levikset repee" by Sini Sabotage feat. VilleGalle	undisclosed	SAFE
5	Haystack	"The Way You Make Me Feel" by Michael Jackson	undisclosed	SAFE

=== Week 4 (4 April) ===
Performances on the fourth episode
#	Stage name	Song	Identity	Result
1	Peacock	"Titanium" by David Guetta and Sia	undisclosed	SAFE
2	Bunny	"Mikä on kun ei taidot riitä" by Martti Servo ja Napander	Henri Alén	OUT
3	Kitty	"Girls Just Want to Have Fun" by Cyndi Lauper	undisclosed	SAFE
4	Cutie	"Your Song" by Elton John	undisclosed	SAFE
5	Lion	"Never Gonna Give You Up" by Rick Astley	undisclosed	SAFE

=== Week 5 (11 April) ===
Performances on the fifth episode
#	Stage name	Song	Identity	Result
1	Horse	"Juppihippipunkkari" by Neljä Ruusua	Paleface	OUT
2	Haystack	"Vadelmavene" by Kasmir	undisclosed	SAFE
3	Chicken	"Tinakenkätyttö" by Kaija Koo	undisclosed	SAFE
4	Wasp	"Bang Bang" by Cher	undisclosed	SAFE

=== Week 6 (18 April) ===
Performances on the sixth episode
#	Stage name	Song	Identity	Result
1	Peacock	"You Oughta Know" by Alanis Morissette	undisclosed	SAFE
2	Kitty	"Vanha sydän" by Erin	undisclosed	SAFE
3	Lion	"Delilah" by Tom Jones	undisclosed	SAFE
4	Cutie	"Rahan takii" by Antti Tuisku	Sami Uotila	OUT

=== Week 7 (24 April) ===
Performances on the seventh episode
#	Stage name	Song	Identity	Result
1	Wasp	"Euphoria" by Loreen	undisclosed	SAFE
2	Haystack	"Ikuinen vappu" by JVG	undisclosed	SAFE
3	Lion	"Just the Way You Are" by Bruno Mars	undisclosed	SAFE
4	Kitty	"Leijonakuningas" by Ellinoora	undisclosed	SAFE
5	Chicken	"Sun särkyä anna mä en" by Johanna Kurkela	Viivi Pumpanen	OUT
6	Peacock	"I'm Outta Love" by Anastacia	undisclosed	SAFE

=== Week 8 (2 May) ===
Performances on the eighth episode
#	Stage name	Song	Identity	Result
1	Haystack	"Made in Heaven" by Jenni Vartiainen	undisclosed	SAFE
2	Peacock	"Shallow" by Lady Gaga and Bradley Cooper	undisclosed	SAFE
3	Kitty	"We Found Love" by Rihanna feat. Calvin Harris	Linda Lampenius	OUT
4	Lion	"September" by Earth, Wind & Fire	undisclosed	SAFE
5	Wasp	"Big Spender" by Dorothy Fields	undisclosed	SAFE

=== Week 9 (9 May) ===
Performances on the ninth episode
#	Stage name	Song	Identity	Result
1	Peacock	"I Hate Myself for Loving You" by Joan Jett	Pandora	OUT
2	Lion	"Kohta sataa" by Pete Parkkonen	undisclosed	SAFE
3	Haystack	"Pilalla" by DJ Ibusal	undisclosed	SAFE
4	Wasp	"9 to 5" by Dolly Parton	undisclosed	SAFE

=== Week 10 (16 May) ===
Group performance: "Don't Stop the Music" by Rihanna

Performances on the tenth episode
#	Stage name	Song	Identity	Result
1	Wasp	"Born This Way" by Lady Gaga	Erika Vikman	THIRD
2	Haystack	"Suomen muotoisen pilven alla" by Arttu Wiskari	Ilkka Alanko	RUNNER-UP
3	Lion	"Can You Feel the Love Tonight" by Elton John	Sami Hedberg	WINNER

== Season 2 ==
Stage name	Celebrity	Occupation	Episodes									
Stage name	Celebrity	Occupation	1	2	3	4	5	6	7	8	9	10
Tohtori (Doctor)	Marko Hietala	Vocalist		SAFE		SAFE		SAFE	SAFE	SAFE	SAFE	WINNER
Hiirulainen (Miss Mouse)	Jarkko Tamminen	Actor & imitator		SAFE		SAFE		SAFE	SAFE	SAFE	SAFE	RUNNER-UP
Pakkanen (Frost)	Mikko Leppilampi	Actor & presenter	SAFE		SAFE		SAFE		SAFE	SAFE	SAFE	THIRD
Taikahattu (Magic Hat)	Krista Siegfrids	Singer	SAFE		SAFE		SAFE		SAFE	SAFE	OUT	
Hertta (Hearts)	Susanna Laine	TV presenter		SAFE		SAFE		SAFE	SAFE	OUT		
Viikinki (Viking)	Petri Nygård	Rapper	SAFE		SAFE		SAFE		OUT			
Laiskiainen (Sloth)	Roman Schatz	Journalist		SAFE		SAFE		OUT				
Kukka (Flower)	Maija-Liisa Peuhu	Actress	SAFE		SAFE		OUT					
Mörkö (Bogeyman)	Timo Jutila	Former ice hockey player		SAFE		OUT						
Geggonen (Gecko)	Kari Kanala	Vicar	SAFE		OUT							
Tikru (Tiger)	Ina Mikkola	Journalist		OUT								
Pöllö (Owl)	Marja Hintikka	Journalist & presenter	OUT									

The masked singer was safe from elimination.
The masked singer was eliminated from the competition and unmasked upon their elimination.
The masked singer did not perform.

=== Week 1 (17 October) ===
Performances on the first episode
#	Stage name	Song	Identity	Result
1	Gecko	"Che Guevara" by Happoradio	undisclosed	SAFE
2	Frost	"Nothing Compares 2 U" by Sinéad O'Connor	undisclosed	SAFE
3	Viking	"Vandraren" by Nordman	undisclosed	SAFE
4	Magic Hat	"Rusketusraidat" by PMMP	undisclosed	SAFE
5	Owl	"Poison" by Alice Cooper	Marja Hintikka	OUT
6	Flower	"Goldfinger" by Shirley Bassey	undisclosed	SAFE

=== Week 2 (24 October) ===
Performances on the second episode
#	Stage name	Song	Identity	Result
1	Sloth	"Don't Worry, Be Happy" by Bobby McFerrin	undisclosed	SAFE
2	Miss Mouse	"Pulp Fiction" by Haloo Helsinki!	undisclosed	SAFE
3	Doctor	"Eteen ja ylös" by Elastinen	undisclosed	SAFE
4	Tiger	"Cicciolina" by Erika Vikman	Ina Mikkola	OUT
5	Hearts	"Wuthering Heights" by Kate Bush	undisclosed	SAFE
6	Bogeyman	"Olen suomalainen" by Kari Tapio	undisclosed	SAFE

Performances on the third episode
#	Stage name	Song	Identity	Result
1	Viking	"U Can't Touch This" by MC Hammer	undisclosed	SAFE
2	Flower	"Rakkauden jälkeen" by Carola	undisclosed	SAFE
3	Gecko	"Mennyt mies" by J. Karjalainen	Kari Kanala	OUT
4	Magic Hat	"Tarkenee" by JVG	undisclosed	SAFE
5	Frost	"The Pretender" by Foo Fighters	undisclosed	SAFE

=== Week 4 (7 November) ===
Performances on the fourth episode
#	Stage name	Song	Identity	Result
1	Bogeyman	"Kuuma kesä" by Popeda	Timo Jutila	OUT
2	Miss Mouse	"Bad Guy" by Billie Eilish	undisclosed	SAFE
3	Doctor	"Goodbye Yellow Brick Road" by Elton John	undisclosed	SAFE
4	Sloth	"The Fox (What Does the Fox Say?)" by Ylvis	undisclosed	SAFE
5	Hearts	"Anytime, Anywhere" by Sarah Brightman	undisclosed	SAFE

=== Week 5 (14 November) ===
Performances on the fifth episode
#	Stage name	Song	Identity	Result
1	Flower	"These Boots Are Made for Walkin'" by Nancy Sinatra	Maija-Liisa Peuhu	OUT
2	Viking	"Pohjois-Karjala" by Leevi and the Leavings	undisclosed	SAFE
3	Frost	"Lose Yourself" by Eminem	undisclosed	SAFE
4	Magic Hat	"La Vie en rose" by Édith Piaf	undisclosed	SAFE

=== Week 6 (21 November) ===
Performances on the sixth episode
#	Stage name	Song	Identity	Result
1	Doctor	"Levoton tyttö" by Anssi Kela	undisclosed	SAFE
2	Sloth	"Highway to Hell" by AC/DC	Roman Schatz	OUT
3	Hearts	"Sweet Dreams (Are Made of This)" by Eurythmics	undisclosed	SAFE
4	Miss Mouse	"The Loco-Motion" by Kylie Minogue	undisclosed	SAFE

=== Week 7 (28 November) ===
Performances on the seventh episode
#	Stage name	Song	Identity	Result
1	Magic Hat	"Chandelier" by Sia	undisclosed	SAFE
2	Viking	"Roy Orbison" by Stig	Petri Nygård	OUT
3	Frost	"I'm Too Sexy" by Right Said Fred	undisclosed	SAFE
4	Miss Mouse	"Dance Monkey" by Tones and I	undisclosed	SAFE
5	Hearts	"On the Radio" by Donna Summer	undisclosed	SAFE
6	Doctor	"Kiss" by Prince and The Revolution	undisclosed	SAFE

=== Week 8 (12 December^{1}) ===
Performances on the eighth episode
#	Stage name	Song	Identity	Result
1	Frost	"What Is Love" by Haddaway	undisclosed	SAFE
2	Magic Hat	"Jolene" By Dolly Parton	undisclosed	SAFE
3	Doctor	"Gangsta's Paradise" by Coolio	undisclosed	SAFE
4	Hearts	"Shanghain valot" by Annika Eklund	Susanna Laine	OUT
5	Miss Mouse	"Ave Maria"	undisclosed	SAFE

^{1} There were no episodes in the first week of December, due other local programming at the same time. The eighth episode of Season 2 was postponed to the following week.

=== Week 9 (18 & 19 December) ===
Performances on the ninth episode
#	Stage name	Song	Identity	Result
1	Doctor	"Autiosaari" by Tuure Kilpeläinen ja Kaihon Karavaani	undisclosed	SAFE
2	Magic Hat	"Missä muruseni on" by Jenni Vartiainen	Krista Siegfrids	OUT
3	Miss Mouse	"Over the Hills and Far Away" by Gary Moore	undisclosed	SAFE
4	Frost	"Lay Me Down" by Sam Smith	undisclosed	SAFE

- Group performance: "Peto on irti" by Antti Tuisku

Performances on the tenth episode
#	Stage name	Song	Identity	Result
1	Doctor	"Everybody (Backstreet's Back)" by Backstreet Boys	Marko Hietala	WINNER
2	Frost	"My Heart Will Go On" by Celine Dion	Mikko Leppilampi	THIRD
3	Miss Mouse	"(You Make Me Feel Like) A Natural Woman" by Aretha Franklin	Jarkko Tamminen	RUNNER-UP

== Season 3 ==
Stage name	Celebrity	Occupation	Episodes												
Stage name	Celebrity	Occupation	1	2	3	4	5	6	7	8	9	10	11	12	13
Supersankari (Superhero)	Anna-Maija Tuokko	Actress				SAFE		SAFE		SAFE		SAFE	SAFE	SAFE	WINNER
Bilepanda (Party Panda)	Waltteri Torikka	Opera singer	SAFE				SAFE		SAFE		SAFE		SAFE	SAFE	RUNNER-UP
Corppi (Raven)	Kasmir	Singer		SAFE			SAFE		SAFE		SAFE		SAFE	SAFE	THIRD
Yksisarvinen (Unicorn)	Saija Tuupanen	Singer		SAFE			SAFE		SAFE		SAFE		SAFE	OUT	
Yksisarvinen (Unicorn)	Sami Hedberg (Note: This is Sami Hedberg's second time competing on Masked Singer Suomi, being on the first season as Lion.)	Comedian and S1 Winner		SAFE			SAFE		SAFE		SAFE		SAFE	OUT	
Dino (Dinosaur)	Minna Kauppi	Orienteer			SAFE			SAFE		SAFE		SAFE	OUT		
Peto (Beast)	Ali Jahangiri	Comedian			SAFE			SAFE		SAFE		SAFE	OUT		
Pusu (Kiss)	Miisa Rotola-Pukkila	Influencer				SAFE		SAFE		SAFE		OUT			
Hattara (Cotton Candy)	Sara Parikka	Actress	SAFE				SAFE		SAFE		OUT				
Vihikoira (Bloodhound)	Esko Eerikäinen	TV Presenter				SAFE		SAFE		OUT					
Murkku (Ant)	Hannu-Pekka Parviainen	Stuntman		SAFE			SAFE		OUT						
Fenix (Phoenix)	Heidi Sohlberg	Model			SAFE			OUT							
Leppäkerttu (Ladybug)	Helena Ahti-Hallberg	Dancer	SAFE				OUT								
Robotti (Robot)	Juha Perälä	Radio host				OUT									
Perhonen (Butterfly)	Anne Kukkohovi	Model			OUT										
Jaguar	Päivi Räsänen	Politician		OUT											
Kettu (Fox)	Jani Sievinen	Swimmer	OUT												
Hirviö (Monster)	Mika Tommola	Reporter										GUEST			

The masked singer was safe from elimination.
The masked singer was eliminated from the competition and unmasked upon their elimination.
The masked singer did not perform.

=== Week 1 (28 August) ===
Performances on the first episode
#	Stage name	Song	Identity	Result
1	Party Panda	"Dragostea Din Tei" by O-Zone	undisclosed	SAFE
2	Fox	"(You Gotta) Fight for Your Right (To Party!)" by Beastie Boys	Jani Sievinen	OUT
3	Ladybug	"Achy Breaky Heart" by Billy Ray Cyrus	undisclosed	SAFE
4	Cotton Candy	"Ei" by Maija Vilkkumaa	undisclosed	SAFE

=== Week 2 (4 September) ===
Performances on the second episode
#	Stage Name	Song	Identity	Result
1	Ant	"Den glider in" by Nick Borgen	undisclosed	SAFE
2	Unicorn	"Let Me Entertain You" by Robbie Williams	undisclosed	SAFE
2	Unicorn	"Let Me Entertain You" by Robbie Williams	undisclosed	SAFE
3	Jaguar	"Kuningaskobra" by Arja Koriseva	Päivi Räsänen	OUT
4	Raven	"Music of the Night" by Andrew Lloyd Webber	undisclosed	SAFE

=== Week 3 (11 September) ===
Performances on the third episode
#	Stage Name	Song	Identity	Result
1	Dinosaur	"Odota" by Aikakone	undisclosed	SAFE
2	Butterfly	"Hotline Bling" by Drake	Anne Kukkohovi	OUT
3	Beast	"Penelope" by william	undisclosed	SAFE
4	Phoenix	"Hanuri" by Antti Tuisku	undisclosed	SAFE

=== Week 4 (18 September) ===
Performances on the fourth episode
#	Stage Name	Song	Identity	Result
1	Superhero	"Crazy in Love" by Beyoncé feat. Jay-Z	undisclosed	SAFE
2	Robot	"Sex on Fire" by Kings of Leon	Juha Perälä	OUT
3	Kiss	"Honey" by Evelina	undisclosed	SAFE
4	Bloodhound	"Drowning" by Backstreet Boys	undisclosed	SAFE

=== Week 5 (25 September) ===
Performances on the fifth episode
#	Stage Name	Song	Identity	Result
1	Raven	"Immigrant Song" by Led Zeppelin	undisclosed	SAFE
2	Ladybug	"Kylmästä lämpimään" by Jukka Poika	Helena Ahti-Hallberg	OUT
3	Cotton Candy	"Torn" by Natalie Imbruglia	undisclosed	SAFE
4	Unicorn	"Wannabe" by Spice Girls	undisclosed	SAFE
4	Unicorn	"Wannabe" by Spice Girls	undisclosed	SAFE
5	Ant	"Timantit on ikuisia" by Cheek	undisclosed	SAFE
6	Party Panda	"Gangnam Style" by Psy	undisclosed	SAFE

=== Week 6 (2 October) ===
Performances on the sixth episode
#	Stage Name	Song	Identity	Result
1	Phoenix	"Mamma Mia" by ABBA	Heidi Sohlberg	OUT
2	Beast	"When the Party's Over" by Billie Eilish	undisclosed	SAFE
3	Bloodhound	"Ring of Fire" by Johnny Cash	undisclosed	SAFE
4	Superhero	"Poker Face" by Lady Gaga	undisclosed	SAFE
5	Kiss	"Mitä mä Malagas?" by Gasellit and JVG	undisclosed	SAFE
6	Dinosaur	"Lauren Caught My Eye" by The Crash	undisclosed	SAFE

=== Week 7 (9 October) ===
Performances on the seventh episode
#	Stage Name	Song	Identity	Result
1	Cotton Candy	"Tytöt" by PMMP	undisclosed	SAFE
2	Party Panda	"Opa Opa" by Notis Sfakianakis	undisclosed	SAFE
3	Raven	"New York, New York" by Frank Sinatra	undisclosed	SAFE
4	Ant	"Pohjanmaalla" by Klamydia	HP Parviainen	OUT
5	Unicorn	"Always Remember Us This Way" by Lady Gaga	undisclosed	SAFE
5	Unicorn	"Always Remember Us This Way" by Lady Gaga	undisclosed	SAFE

=== Week 8 (16 October) ===
Performances on the eighth episode
#	Stage Name	Song	Identity	Result
1	Beast	"Uptown Funk" by Mark Ronson feat. Bruno Mars	undisclosed	SAFE
2	Dinosaur	"Väärään suuntaan" by Jenni Vartiainen	undisclosed	SAFE
3	Bloodhound	"La Camisa Negra" by Juanes	Esko Eerikäinen	OUT
4	Kiss	"I Kissed a Girl" by Katy Perry	undisclosed	SAFE
5	Superhero	"Listen to Your Heart" by Roxette	undisclosed	SAFE

=== Week 9 (23 October) ===
Performances on the ninth episode
#	Stage Name	Song	Identity	Result
1	Raven	"Thriller" by Michael Jackson	undisclosed	SAFE
2	Cotton Candy	"Päivänsäde ja menninkäinen" by Tapio Rautavaara	Sara Parikka	OUT
3	Party Panda	"Who Let the Dogs Out" by Baha Men	undisclosed	SAFE
4	Unicorn	"Oot voimani mun" by Anna Eriksson	undisclosed	SAFE
4	Unicorn	"Oot voimani mun" by Anna Eriksson	undisclosed	SAFE

=== Week 10 (30 October) ===
- Guest performance: "Kanoottilaulu" by Sielun Veljet performed by Mika Tommola as Monster

Performances on the tenth episode
#	Stage Name	Song	Identity	Result
1	Dinosaur	"Eye of the Tiger" by Survivor	undisclosed	SAFE
2	Beast	"Zombie" by The Cranberries	undisclosed	SAFE
3	Superhero	"Break My Heart" by Dua Lipa	undisclosed	SAFE
4	Kiss	"Lovely" by Billie Eilish and Khalid	Miisa Rotola-Pukkila	OUT

=== Week 11 (6 November) ===
Performances on the eleventh episode
#	Stage Name	Song	Identity	Result
1	Superhero	"Sama nainen" by Chisu	undisclosed	SAFE
2	Dinosaur	"Don't You Worry Child" by Swedish House Mafia feat. John Martin	Minna Kauppi	OUT
3	Beast	"Thinking Out Loud" by Ed Sheeran	Ali Jahangiri	OUT
4	Raven	"Come Together" by The Beatles	undisclosed	SAFE
5	Unicorn	"You Raise Me Up" by Josh Groban	undisclosed	SAFE
5	Unicorn	"You Raise Me Up" by Josh Groban	undisclosed	SAFE
6	Party Panda	"Macarena" by Los del Rio	undisclosed	SAFE

=== Week 12 (13 November) ===
Performances on the twelfth episode
#	Stage Name	Song	Identity	Result
1	Party Panda	"Treenaa" by Antti Tuisku	undisclosed	SAFE
2	Unicorn	"Sorry Seems to Be the Hardest Word" by Elton John	Saija Tuupanen	OUT
2	Unicorn	"Sorry Seems to Be the Hardest Word" by Elton John	Sami Hedberg	OUT
3	Superhero	"Let's Get Loud" by Jennifer Lopez	undisclosed	SAFE
4	Raven	"Karma" by Alma	undisclosed	SAFE

=== Week 13 (20 November) ===
- Group performance: "I Love You" By Teflon Brothers & Pandora

Performances on the thirteenth episode
#	Stage Name	Song	Identity	Result
1	Superhero	"All I Want for Christmas Is You" by Mariah Carey	Anna-Maija Tuokko	WINNER
2	Raven	"Jos mä oon oikee" by Sanni	Kasmir	THIRD
3	Party Panda	"Scatman (Ski-Ba-Bop-Ba-Dop-Bop)" by Scatman John	Waltteri Torikka	RUNNER-UP

== Season 4 ==
Stage name	Celebrity	Occupation	Episodes											
Stage name	Celebrity	Occupation	1	2	3	4	5	6	7	8	9	10	11	12
Musta-Lammas (Black Sheep) (WC)	Lenni-Kalle Taipale	Pianist						SAFE		SAFE	SAFE	SAFE	SAFE	WINNER
Örkki (Orc)	Tuure Boelius	YouTuber	SAFE		SAFE		SAFE		SAFE		SAFE	SAFE	SAFE	RUNNER-UP
Hodari (Hot Dog)	Nelli Matula	Singer		SAFE		SAFE		SAFE		SAFE	SAFE	SAFE	SAFE	THIRD
Banaani (Banana)	Janne Ahonen	Former Ski Jumper	SAFE		SAFE		SAFE		SAFE		SAFE	SAFE	OUT	
Party Animal	Chachi Gonzales Hildén	Dancer	SAFE		SAFE		SAFE		SAFE		SAFE	OUT		
Sarvikuono (Rhino)	Juuso "Köpi" Kallio	Radio personality		SAFE		SAFE		SAFE		SAFE	OUT			
Siili (Hedgehog)	Tuija Pehkonen	Radio personality		SAFE		SAFE		SAFE		OUT				
Kruuna ja Klaava (Heads and Tails) (WC)	Ville "Viki" Eerikkilä	Radio personalities					SAFE		OUT					
Kruuna ja Klaava (Heads and Tails) (WC)	Juuso "Köpi" Kallio	Radio personalities					SAFE		OUT					
Ukkonen (Thunder)	Miitta Sorvali	Actress		SAFE		SAFE		OUT						
Timantti (Diamond)	Janina Fry	Singer	SAFE		SAFE		OUT							
Ritari (Knight)	Eino Grön	Singer		SAFE		OUT								
Fikkari (Flashlight)	Niina Lahtinen	Actress	SAFE		OUT									
Sammakko (Frog)	Sami Sykkö	Journalist		OUT										
Kaappikello (Grandfather Clock)	Kari Aihinen	Chef	OUT											

=== Week 1 (3 September) ===
Performances on the first episode
#	Stage name	Song	Identity	Result
1	Party Animal	"Lips Are Movin" by Meghan Trainor	undisclosed	SAFE
2	Orc	"Satulinna" by Jari Sillanpää	undisclosed	SAFE
3	Banana	"Vauhti kiihtyy" by Portion Boys feat. Matti ja Teppo	undisclosed	SAFE
4	Diamond	"Syntisten pöytä" by Erika Vikman	undisclosed	SAFE
5	Grandfather Clock	"Hetki lyö" by Kirka	Kari Aihinen	OUT
6	Flashlight	"Toxic" by Britney Spears	undisclosed	SAFE

=== Week 2 (10 September) ===
Performances on the second episode
#	Stage name	Song	Identity	Result
1	Frog	"Tipi-tii" by Marion Rung	Sami Sykkö	OUT
2	Hedgehog	"It's Raining Men" by The Weather Girls	undisclosed	SAFE
3	Thunder	"Satumaa-tango" by Maija Vilkkumaa	undisclosed	SAFE
4	Knight	"I've Got You Under My Skin" by Frank Sinatra	undisclosed	SAFE
5	Rhino	"Kran Turismo" by JVG	undisclosed	SAFE
6	Hot Dog	"Yön kuningattaren aaria" by Wolfgang Amadeus Mozart	undisclosed	SAFE

=== Week 3 (17 September) ===
Performances on the third episode
#	Stage name	Song	Identity	Result
1	Diamond	"Let It Go" by Idina Menzel	undisclosed	SAFE
2	Orc	"Samma gamla vanliga" by A36	undisclosed	SAFE
3	Flashlight	"Hei rakas" by Behm	Niina Lahtinen	OUT
4	Party Animal	"Kill This Love" by Blackpink	undisclosed	SAFE
5	Banana	"Sinun vuorosi loistaa" by Juha Tapio	undisclosed	SAFE

=== Week 4 (24 September) ===
Performances on the fourth episode
#	Stage name	Song	Identity	Result
1	Rhino	"Chillaa meiän kanssa" by Sere	undisclosed	SAFE
2	Thunder	"Valot pimeyksien reunoilla" by Apulanta	undisclosed	SAFE
3	Hot Dog	"Poika saunoo" by Poju	undisclosed	SAFE
4	Hedgehog	"Soo Soo" by Abreu	undisclosed	SAFE
5	Knight	"Tykkään susta niin että halkeen" by Juha Tapio	Eino Grön	OUT

=== Week 5 (1 October) ===
Performances on the fifth episode
#	Stage name	Song	Identity	Result
Wildcard	Heads and Tails	"Esson baariin" by Poju	undisclosed	SAFE
Wildcard	Heads and Tails	"Esson baariin" by Poju	undisclosed	SAFE
2	Party Animal	"How Far I'll Go" from Moana	undisclosed	SAFE
3	Diamond	"Physical" by Dua Lipa	Janina Fry	OUT
4	Banana	"Epäröimättä hetkeekään" by Elastinen & Jenni Vartiainen	undisclosed	SAFE
5	Orc	"Uprising" by Muse	undisclosed	SAFE

=== Week 6 (8 October) ===
Performances on the sixth episode
#	Stage name	Song	Identity	Result
1	Rhino	"Song 2" by Blur	undisclosed	SAFE
2	Thunder	"You Can't Hurry Love" by The Supremes	Miitta Sorvali	OUT
3	Hedgehog	"Conga" by Miami Sound Machine	undisclosed	SAFE
4	Hot Dog	"Perutaan häät" by Anne Mattila	undisclosed	SAFE
Wildcard	Black Sheep	"Huominen on huomenna" by JVG feat. Anna Abreu	undisclosed	SAFE

=== Week 7 (15 October) ===
Performances on the seventh episode
#	Stage name	Song	Identity	Result
1	Orc	"Avaimet mun kiesiin" by Cheek	undisclosed	SAFE
2	Heads and Tails	"Imus" by Gasellit	Ville Eerikkilä	OUT
2	Heads and Tails	"Imus" by Gasellit	Juuso Kallio	OUT
3	Banana	"You're My World" by Cilla Black	undisclosed	SAFE
4	Party Animal	"I Want You Back" by The Jackson 5	undisclosed	SAFE

=== Week 8 (22 October) ===
Performances on the eighth episode
#	Stage name	Song	Identity	Result
1	Rhino	"Lähe mun kaa" by Karri Koira	undisclosed	SAFE
2	Black Sheep	"Riippumatto" by Mikael Gabriel	undisclosed	SAFE
3	Hedgehog	"Pokka" by Irina Saari	Tuija Pehkonen	OUT
4	Hot Dog	"Taivas lyö tulta" by Teräsbetoni	undisclosed	SAFE

=== Week 9 (29 October) ===
Performances on the ninth episode
#	Stage name	Song	Identity	Result
1	Black Sheep	"1972" by Anssi Kela	undisclosed	SAFE
2	Hot Dog	"The Ketchup Song (Aserejé)" by Las Ketchup	undisclosed	SAFE
3	Orc	"Olet puolisoni nyt" by Samuli Putro	undisclosed	SAFE
4	Party Animal	"Dark Side" by Blind Channel	undisclosed	SAFE
5	Rhino	"On niin helppoo olla onnellinen" by Olavi Uusivirta	Juuso Kallio	OUT
6	Banana	"Maradona (kesä '86)" by Teflon Brothers	undisclosed	SAFE

=== Week 10 (5 November) ===
Performances on the tenth episode
#	Stage name	Song	Identity	Result
1	Party Animal	"Good 4 U" by Olivia Rodrigo	Chachi Gonzales Hildén	OUT
2	Black Sheep	"Surun pyyhit silmistäni" by Kirka	undisclosed	SAFE
3	Hot Dog	"Rakkauslaulu" by Johanna Kurkela	undisclosed	SAFE
4	Banana	"Aaveratsastajat (Ghost Riders)" by Kari Tapio	undisclosed	SAFE
5	Orc	"Don't Stop Believin''" by Journey	undisclosed	SAFE

=== Week 11 (12 November) ===
Performances on the eleventh episode
#	Stage name	Song	Identity	Result
1	Orc	"I Wanna Be Your Slave" by Måneskin	undisclosed	SAFE
2	Banana	"Älä mee" by Ressu Redford	Janne Ahonen	OUT
3	Hot Dog	"I'm So Excited" by The Pointer Sisters	undisclosed	SAFE
4	Black Sheep	"Pelimies" by Martti Vainaa & Sallitut aineet	undisclosed	SAFE

=== Week 12 (19 November) ===
- Group performance: "Bad Romance" by Lady Gaga

Performances on the twelfth episode
#	Stage Name	Song	Identity	Result
1	Black Sheep	"Mitä kuuluu" by Apulanta	Lenni-Kalle Taipale	WINNER
2	Hot Dog	"Lady Marmalade" by Labelle	Nelli Matula	THIRD
3	Orc	"Fairytale Gone Bad" by Sunrise Avenue	Tuure Boelius	RUNNER-UP

== Season 5 ==
Stage name	Celebrity	Occupation	Episodes											
Stage name	Celebrity	Occupation	1	2	3	4	5	6	7	8	9	10	11	12
Kolibri (Hummingbird) (WC)	Bess	Singer						SAFE		SAFE	SAFE	SAFE	SAFE	WINNER
Kiuas (Sauna Stove)	Jarkko Ahola	Musician	SAFE		SAFE		SAFE		SAFE		SAFE	SAFE	SAFE	RUNNER-UP
Maajussi (Farmer)	Hanna Pakarinen	Singer	SAFE		SAFE		SAFE		SAFE		SAFE	SAFE	SAFE	THIRD
Kylpyankka (Rubber Ducky)	Lotta Hintsa	Mountaineer	SAFE		SAFE		SAFE		SAFE		SAFE	SAFE	OUT	
Taapero (Toddler)	Paula Noronen	Journalist		SAFE		SAFE		SAFE		SAFE	SAFE	OUT		
Mustekala (Octopus)	Veronica Verho	Presenter		SAFE		SAFE		SAFE		SAFE	OUT			
Discokissa (Disco Cat)	Aino-Kaisa Saarinen	Former cross-country skier		SAFE		SAFE		SAFE		OUT				
Bulldog (WC)	Esko Kovero	Actor					SAFE		OUT					
Nöpö (Cute)	Niko Saarinen	Television personality		SAFE		SAFE		OUT						
Bambi	Sirpa Selänne	Philanthropist	SAFE		SAFE		OUT							
Orava (Squirrel)	Eini	Singer		SAFE		OUT								
Co2	Jaakko Parkkali	YouTuber	SAFE		OUT									
Ilopilleri (Happy Pill)	Joonas Nordman	Actor		OUT										
Sudenkorento (Dragonfly)	Jani Toivola	Actor	OUT											

=== Week 1 (9 September) ===
Performances on the first episode
#	Stage name	Song	Identity	Result
1	Dragonfly	"Anna soida" by Elastinen	Jani Toivola	OUT
2	Rubber Ducky	"Se on kuin yö (A Whole New World)" from Aladdin	undisclosed	SAFE
3	Sauna Stove	"Villieläin" by Ramses II	undisclosed	SAFE
4	Bambi	"Tytöt ei soita kitaraa" by Vesala	undisclosed	SAFE
5	Co2	"Nautin elämästä" by Portion Boys & Teflon Brothers	undisclosed	SAFE
6	Farmer	"Maalaispoika oon" by Mikko Alatalo	undisclosed	SAFE

=== Week 2 (16 September) ===
Performances on the second episode
#	Stage name	Song	Identity	Result
1	Toddler	"Axel F" by Crazy Frog	undisclosed	SAFE
2	Cute	"Hiekka" by Apulanta	undisclosed	SAFE
3	Happy Pill	"Hurt" by Johnny Cash	Joonas Nordman	OUT
4	Squirrel	"Rakastan en rakasta" by Bess	undisclosed	SAFE
5	Disco Cat	"Pikkuveli" by PMMP	undisclosed	SAFE
6	Octopus	"Sininen uni" by Tapio Rautavaara	undisclosed	SAFE

=== Week 3 (23 September) ===
Performances on the third episode
#	Stage name	Song	Identity	Result
1	Farmer	"Can't Help Falling in Love" by Elvis Presley	undisclosed	SAFE
2	Rubber Ducky	"Amatimies" by JVG	undisclosed	SAFE
3	Co2	"Matkalla Alabamaan" by Popeda	Jaakko Parkkali	OUT
4	Bambi	"Supernaiset" by Kaija Koo	undisclosed	SAFE
5	Sauna Stove	"What a Wonderful World" by Louis Armstrong	undisclosed	SAFE

=== Week 4 (30 September) ===
Performances on the fourth episode
#	Stage name	Song	Identity	Result
1	Octopus	"Tytöt tykkää" by Tea	undisclosed	SAFE
2	Cute	"Vamos" by JVG	undisclosed	SAFE
3	Disco Cat	"Duran Duran" by Jenni Vartiainen	undisclosed	SAFE
4	Squirrel	"Dinosauruksii" by Ellinoora	Eini	OUT
5	Toddler	"Nyanpasu" by Kotori Koiwai	undisclosed	SAFE

=== Week 5 (7 October) ===
Performances on the fifth episode
#	Stage name	Song	Identity	Result
1	Sauna Stove	"20min" by Isac Elliot feat. william & Cledos	undisclosed	SAFE
2	Farmer	"Cotton Eye Joe" by Rednex	undisclosed	SAFE
3	Rubber Ducky	"Yes sir, alkaa polttaa" by Eini	undisclosed	SAFE
4	Bambi	"Money, Money, Money" by ABBA	Sirpa Selänne	OUT
Wildcard	Bulldog	"Cha Cha Cha" by Käärijä	undisclosed	SAFE

=== Week 6 (14 October) ===
Performances on the sixth episode
#	Stage name	Song	Identity	Result
Wildcard	Hummingbird	"Kellä kulta, sillä onni" by Laila Kinnunen	undisclosed	SAFE
2	Cute	"Sua varten" by Robin	Niko Saarinen	OUT
3	Toddler	"40K" by Sexmane	undisclosed	SAFE
4	Disco Cat	"Sata salamaa" by Vicky Rosti	undisclosed	SAFE
5	Octopus	"Roviolla" by Gimmel	undisclosed	SAFE

=== Week 7 (21 October) ===
Performances on the seventh episode
#	Stage name	Song	Identity	Result
1	Bulldog	"Hyvä, paha, ruma mies" by Tuure Kilpeläinen ja Kaihon Karavaani	Esko Kovero	OUT
2	Rubber Ducky	"C'est la vie" by Anna Puu	undisclosed	SAFE
3	Farmer	"Kuuma jäbä" by Isaac Sene	undisclosed	SAFE
4	Sauna Stove	"Stay with Me" by Sam Smith	undisclosed	SAFE

=== Week 8 (28 October) ===
Performances on the eight episode
#	Stage name	Song	Identity	Result
1	Octopus	"Call Me Maybe" by Carly Rae Jepsen	undisclosed	SAFE
2	Toddler	"Pulkka" by Vesala	undisclosed	SAFE
3	Disco Cat	"Romeo ja Julia" by Movetron	Aino-Kaisa Saarinen	OUT
4	Hummingbird	"Främling" by Carola Häggkvist	undisclosed	SAFE

=== Week 9 (4 November) ===
Performances on the ninth episode
#	Stage name	Song	Identity	Result
1	Sauna Stove	"Hopeinen kuu" by Olavi Virta	undisclosed	SAFE
2	Octopus	"Fame" by Irene Cara	Veronica Verho	OUT
3	Hummingbird	"I Have Nothing" by Whitney Houston	undisclosed	SAFE
4	Toddler	"Tulipalo" by Kuumaa	undisclosed	SAFE
5	Rubber Ducky	"Angels" by Within Temptation	undisclosed	SAFE
6	Farmer	"Ram pam pam" by Bess	undisclosed	SAFE

=== Week 10 (11 November) ===
Performances on the tenth episode
#	Stage name	Song	Identity	Result
1	Farmer	"Nemo" by Nightwish	undisclosed	SAFE
2	Rubber Ducky	"Firework" by Katy Perry	undisclosed	SAFE
3	Hummingbird	"Mas que Nada" by Jorge Ben	undisclosed	SAFE
4	Toddler	"Nää yöt ei anna armoo" by Kaija Koo	Paula Noronen	OUT
5	Sauna Stove	"Join Me in Death" by HIM	undisclosed	SAFE

=== Week 11 (18 November) ===
- Guest performance: "Kids" by Robbie Williams & Kylie Minogue performed by Ilkka Uusivuori and Season 3 winner Anna-Maija Tuokko as "Superhero."

Performances on the eleventh episode
#	Stage name	Song	Duet partner	Identity	Result
1	Rubber Ducky	"Eternal Flame" by The Bangles	Lauri Mikkola	Lotta Hintsa	OUT
2	Farmer	"GRINDR MAYHEM" by Antti Tuisku feat. Bess	Bess	undisclosed	SAFE
3	Sauna Stove	"Löylyä lissää" by Ramses II feat. JVG	Ramses II	undisclosed	SAFE
4	Hummingbird	"Chandelier" by Sia	Pandora	undisclosed	SAFE

=== Week 12 (25 November) ===
- Guest performance: "Minä suojelen sinua kaikelta" by Ultra Bra performed by Bodyguards

Performances on the twelfth episode
#	Stage name	Song	Identity	Result
1	Sauna Stove	"I Will Always Love You" by Whitney Houston	Jarkko Ahola	RUNNER-UP
2	Hummingbird	"Rebel Yell" by Billy Idol	Bess	WINNER
3	Farmer	"Hold My Hand" by Lady Gaga	Hanna Pakarinen	THIRD

== Season 6 ==
Stage name	Celebrity	Occupation	Episodes											
Stage name	Celebrity	Occupation	1	2	3	4	5	6	7	8	9	10	11	12
Metsäpeikko (Forest Troll) (WC)	Atte Kilpinen	Ballet dancer					SAFE		SAFE	SAFE	SAFE	SAFE	SAFE	WINNER
Yö ja Päivä (Night & Day)	Arja Koriseva	Singer	SAFE		SAFE		SAFE		SAFE	SAFE	SAFE	SAFE	SAFE	RUNNER-UP
Luuranko (Skeleton)	Erja Lyytinen	Musician		SAFE		SAFE		SAFE	SAFE	SAFE	SAFE	SAFE	SAFE	THIRD
Kakka (Poo)	Sari Aalto	Ventriloquist		SAFE		SAFE		SAFE	SAFE	SAFE	SAFE	SAFE	OUT	
Pesukarhu (Raccoon)	Gogi Mavromichalis	Television presenter	SAFE		SAFE		SAFE		SAFE	SAFE	SAFE	OUT		
Kontiainen (Mole) (WC)	Meeri Koutaniemi	Photographer						SAFE	SAFE	SAFE	OUT			
Minttu (Mint)	Mikko Töyssy	Actor		SAFE		SAFE		SAFE	SAFE	OUT				
Toukka (Caterpillar)	Katri Niskanen	Fashion designer	SAFE		SAFE		SAFE		OUT					
Huisku (Whisk)	Mert Otsamo	Fashion designer		SAFE		SAFE		OUT						
Kalakukko (Fish Rooster)	Joel Hallikainen	Musician	SAFE		SAFE		OUT							
Tähkä (Cob)	Marko Anttila	Ice hockey player		SAFE		OUT								
Tikkari (Lollipop)	Emma Kimiläinen	Racing driver	SAFE		OUT									
Raasu (Ragdoll)	Ellen Jokikunnas	Presenter		OUT										
Pellet (Clowns)	Lakko	YouTubers	OUT											
Pellet (Clowns)	Herbalisti	YouTubers	OUT											
Euroviisu (Eurovision)	Mikko Silvennoinen	Television presenter										GUEST		
Usko Dindulaati	Kiti Kokkonen	Actress											GUEST	

=== Week 1 (31 August) ===
Performances on the first episode
#	Stage name	Song	Identity	Result
1	Caterpillar	"Mato" by Apulanta	undisclosed	SAFE
2	Lollipop	"Don't Start Now" by Dua Lipa	undisclosed	SAFE
3	Clowns	"Enemy" by Imagine Dragons & JID	Lakko	OUT
3	Clowns	"Enemy" by Imagine Dragons & JID	Herbalisti	OUT
4	Raccoon	"Pauhaava sydän" by Lauri Tähkä & Elonkerjuu	undisclosed	SAFE
5	Fish Rooster	"Sokka irti" by Cheek	undisclosed	SAFE
6	Night & Day	"The Phantom of the Opera" by Nightwish	undisclosed	SAFE

=== Week 2 (7 September) ===
Performances on the second episode
#	Stage name	Song	Identity	Result
1	Poo	"Levikset repee" by Sini Sabotage feat. VilleGalle	undisclosed	SAFE
2	Ragdoll	"Säännöt rakkaudelle" by Anna Puu	Ellen Jokikunnas	OUT
3	Whisk	"Kaiken takana on nainen" by Matti ja Teppo	undisclosed	SAFE
4	Cob	"Löikö Mörkö sisään?" by DJ ILG feat. Antero Mertaranta	undisclosed	SAFE
5	Mint	"Lintu" by Suvi Teräsniska	undisclosed	SAFE
6	Skeleton	"Happy" by Pharrell Williams	undisclosed	SAFE

=== Week 3 (14 September) ===
Performances on the third episode
#	Stage name	Song	Identity	Result
1	Raccoon	"Sexy and I Know It" by LMFAO	undisclosed	SAFE
2	Fish Rooster	"Italian yössä" by Waltteri Torikka	undisclosed	SAFE
3	Night & Day	"Lokin päällä lokki" by Apulanta	undisclosed	SAFE
4	Lollipop	"Pump Up the Jam" by Technotronic	Emma Kimiläinen	OUT
5	Caterpillar	"Haluun takas mun perhoset" by pehmoaino	undisclosed	SAFE

=== Week 4 (21 September) ===
Performances on the fourth episode
#	Stage name	Song	Identity	Result
1	Mint	"Pienen pojan elämää" by Klamydia	undisclosed	SAFE
2	Cob	"Kohti sydänpeltoja" by Vesterinen Yhtyeineen	Marko Anttila	OUT
3	Skeleton	"Timanttei" by Mirella	undisclosed	SAFE
4	Whisk	"Keinu" by Cheek	undisclosed	SAFE
5	Poo	"Ironic" by Alanis Morissette	undisclosed	SAFE

=== Week 5 (28 September) ===
Performances on the fifth episode
#	Stage name	Song	Identity	Result
Wildcard	Forest Troll	"Tässä tulee Rölli" by Rölli	undisclosed	SAFE
2	Night & Day	"Tässä on kaikki" by Kuumaa	undisclosed	SAFE
3	Caterpillar	"Tässäkö tää oli?" by Arttu Wiskari feat. Leavings-Orkesteri	undisclosed	SAFE
4	Fish Rooster	"Kuurankukka" by Joel Hallikainen	Joel Hallikainen	OUT
5	Raccoon	"Jippikayjei" by Cheek	undisclosed	SAFE

=== Week 6 (5 October) ===
Performances on the sixth episode
#	Stage name	Song	Identity	Result
1	Whisk	"It's a Sin" by Pet Shop Boys	Mert Otsamo	OUT
2	Mint	"Shape of My Heart" by Backstreet Boys	undisclosed	SAFE
3	Poo	"Tempo" by Bess	undisclosed	SAFE
4	Skeleton	"Running Up That Hill" by Kate Bush	undisclosed	SAFE
Wildcard	Mole	"I'm Good (Blue)" by David Guetta & Bebe Rexha	undisclosed	SAFE

=== Week 7 (12 October) – The Clue Songs ===
Performances on the seventh episode
#	Stage name	Song	Identity	Result
1	Mint	"Häissä" by Jare & VilleGalle feat. Märkä-Simo	undisclosed	SAFE
2	Night & Day	"Hijo de la Luna" by Mecano	undisclosed	SAFE
3	Poo	"Paloma Blanca" by Katri Helena	undisclosed	SAFE
4	Skeleton	"En haluu kuolla tänä yönä" by Jenni Vartiainen	undisclosed	SAFE
5	Caterpillar	"Matkustaja" by Ahti feat. Aksel Kankaanranta	Katri Niskanen	OUT
6	Raccoon	"Pretty Fly (For a White Guy)" by The Offspring	undisclosed	SAFE
7	Mole	"Ei suomalaiset tanssi" by Haloo Helsinki!	undisclosed	SAFE
8	Forest Troll	"Hollywood Hills" by Sunrise Avenue	undisclosed	SAFE

=== Week 8 (19 October) ===
Performances on the eighth episode
#	Stage name	Song	Identity	Result
1	Forest Troll	"Universum" by nublu & Mikael Gabriel	undisclosed	SAFE
2	Poo	"All by Myself" by Celine Dion	undisclosed	SAFE
3	Mole	"Sex Bomb" by Tom Jones & Mousse T.	undisclosed	SAFE
4	Raccoon	"Can't Take My Eyes Off You" by Frankie Valli	undisclosed	SAFE
5	Night & Day	"Maasta taivaaseen" by pehmoaino	undisclosed	SAFE
6	Mint	"Viva Las Vegas" by Elvis Presley (Note: Black Sheep appeared as a cameo during Mint's last performance, playing an electric piano while Mint performed.)	Mikko Töyssy	OUT
7	Skeleton	"Hallelujah" by Jeff Buckley	undisclosed	SAFE

=== Week 9 (26 October) – Halloween ===
Performances on the ninth episode
#	Stage name	Song	Identity	Result
1	Poo	"Demoneista ystävii" by Etta	undisclosed	SAFE
2	Raccoon	"Ghostbusters" by Ray Parker Jr.	undisclosed	SAFE
3	Night & Day	"Bloody Mary" by Lady Gaga	undisclosed	SAFE
4	Forest Troll	"Spooky Scary Skeletons (Remix)" by The Living Tombstone	undisclosed	SAFE
5	Mole	"You Make Me Feel Like It's Halloween" by Muse	Meeri Koutaniemi	OUT
6	Skeleton	"Master of Puppets" by Metallica	undisclosed	SAFE

=== Week 10 (2 November) – Eurovision ===
Performances on the tenth episode
#	Stage name	Song	Identity	Result
1	Eurovision	"Eläköön elämä" by Sonja Lumme	Mikko Silvennoinen	GUEST
2	Raccoon	"Hard Rock Hallelujah" by Lordi	Gogi Mavromichalis	OUT
3	Skeleton	"Sata salamaa" by Vicky Rosti	undisclosed	SAFE
4	Poo	"Queen of Kings" by Alessandra	undisclosed	SAFE
5	Night & Day	"Tattoo" by Loreen	undisclosed	SAFE
6	Forest Troll	"Fairytale" by Alexander Rybak	undisclosed	SAFE

=== Week 11 (9 November) – Duets ===
Performances on the eleventh episode
#	Stage name	Song	Duet partner	Identity	Result
1	Usko Dindulaati	"Paremmin ku kukaan muu" by Benjamin & Bess	Benjamin	Kiti Kokkonen	GUEST
2	Skeleton	"You Raise Me Up" by Josh Groban	Kasmir	undisclosed	SAFE
3	Forest Troll	"Ruoska" by Käärijä & Erika Vikman	Erika Vikman	undisclosed	SAFE
4	Night & Day	"Lovely" by Billie Eilish & Khalid	Konsta Hietanen	undisclosed	SAFE
5	Poo	"Paskana" by Sara Siipola	Sara Siipola	Sari Aalto	OUT

=== Week 12 (16 November) – Final ===
Performances on the twelfth episode
#	Stage name	Song	Identity	Result
Round One
1	Skeleton	"Nah Neh Nah" by Vaya Con Dios	undisclosed	
2	Night & Day	"Minun tieni" by Tapani Kansa	undisclosed	
3	Forest Troll	"Tequila" by The Champs	undisclosed	
Round Two
4	Skeleton	"Hallelujah" by Jeff Buckley	Erja Lyytinen	THIRD
5	Night & Day	"Maasta taivaaseen" by pehmoaino	Arja Koriseva	RUNNER-UP
6	Forest Troll	"Spooky Scary Skeletons (Remix)" by The Living Tombstone	Atte Kilpinen	WINNER

== Season 7 ==
Stage name	Celebrity	Occupation	Episodes											
Stage name	Celebrity	Occupation	1	2	3	4	5	6	7	8	9	10 (Note: None of the competitors were eliminated in this episode.)	11	12
Pierumies (Fartman)	Sebastian Rejman	Singer		SAFE		SAFE		SAFE	SAFE	SAFE	SAFE	SAFE	SAFE	WINNER
Papparainen (Old Man)	Jarkko Tamminen	Imitator		SAFE		SAFE		SAFE	SAFE	SAFE	SAFE	SAFE	SAFE	RUNNER-UP
Merenneito (Mermaid)	Jannika B	Singer		SAFE		SAFE		SAFE	SAFE	SAFE	SAFE	SAFE	SAFE	THIRD
Hai (Shark)	Sonja Kailassaari	TV Presenter		SAFE		SAFE		SAFE	SAFE	SAFE	SAFE	SAFE	OUT	
Kameleontti (Chameleon)	Portion Boys (Note: Each member of Portion Boys performed individually; El Meissel in episode 1, A.P. Vuori in episodes 3 and 9, Taiteilija Nieminen in episode 5, JaloTiina in episode 7, and Kenraali Vahva in episode 8)	Dance-pop band	SAFE		SAFE		SAFE		SAFE	SAFE	OUT			
Mansikki (Cow)	Miska Haakana	YouTuber	SAFE		SAFE		SAFE		SAFE	OUT				
Kukkakärpänen (Hoverfly)	Linnea Leino	Actress	SAFE		SAFE		SAFE		OUT					
Hämähäkki (Spider) (WC)	Satu Silvo	Actress				SAFE		OUT						
Riiviö (Rascal)	Cristal Snow	Drag artist	SAFE		SAFE		OUT							
Kulkukoira (Stray Dog)	Eero Ritala	Actor	SAFE		SAFE		OUT (Note: All panelists used Poista maski and correctly guessed the celebrity's identity, causing the latter to be unmasked immediately)							
Haisunäätä (Skunk)	Shirly Karvinen	Presenter		SAFE		OUT								
Sikapossu (Pig) (WC)	Vesku Jokinen	Musician			OUT									
Paviaani (Baboon)	Paavo Arhinmäki	Politician		OUT										
Poni (Pony)	Lola Odusoga	Media personality	OUT											

=== Week 1 (6 September) ===
Performances on the first episode
#	Stage name	Song	Identity	Result
1	Cow	"R-A-K-A-S" by Tapani Kansa	undisclosed	SAFE
2	Rascal	"Go the Distance" from Hercules	undisclosed	SAFE
3	Hoverfly	"Pedro" by Jaxomy, Agatino Romero, Raffaella Carrà	undisclosed	SAFE
4	Pony	"Ghost Town" by Adam Lambert	Lola Odusoga	OUT
5	Stray Dog	"Kysy mua ulos" by Vesala	undisclosed	SAFE
6	Chameleon	"Dancing Lasha Tumbai " by Verka Serduchka	undisclosed	SAFE

=== Week 2 (13 September) ===
Performances on the second episode
#	Stage name	Song	Identity	Result
1	Mermaid	"Memory" from Cats	undisclosed	SAFE
2	Shark	"Baby Shark" by Pinkfong	undisclosed	SAFE
3	Baboon	"Katto auki" by Gasellit	Paavo Arhinmäki	OUT
4	Skunk	"Pidä musta kii" by Pamela Tola	undisclosed	SAFE
5	Old Man	"Töis" by Cledos feat. DeezyDavid	undisclosed	SAFE
6	Fartman	"It's My Life" by Bon Jovi	undisclosed	SAFE

=== Week 3 (20 September) ===
Performances on the third episode
#	Stage name	Song	Identity	Result
1	Stray Dog	"Kesäkatu" by Danny	undisclosed	SAFE
2	Chameleon	"Makso mitä makso" by Isac Elliot feat. Sexmane	undisclosed	SAFE
3	Rascal	"Born with a Broken Heart" by Damiano David	undisclosed	SAFE
4	Hoverfly	"It's Oh So Quiet" by Björk	undisclosed	SAFE
5	Cow	"San Francisco Boy" by Käärijä & Hooja	undisclosed	SAFE
Wildcard	Pig	"Ukkometso" by Pate Mustajärvi	Vesku Jokinen	OUT

=== Week 4 (27 September) ===
Performances on the fourth episode
#	Stage name	Song	Identity	Result
1	Shark	"Kot Kot" by Käärijä	undisclosed	SAFE
2	Fartman	"Right Here Waiting" by Richard Marx	undisclosed	SAFE
3	Skunk	"Baby" by Justin Bieber feat. Ludacris	Shirly Karvinen	OUT
4	Old Man	"Väärään aikaan" by Ahti feat. Hugo	undisclosed	SAFE
5	Mermaid	"Part of Your World" from The Little Mermaid	undisclosed	SAFE
Wildcard	Spider	"Ich komme" by Erika Vikman	undisclosed	SAFE

=== Week 5 (4 October) ===
- Guest performance: "Sabotage" by Beastie Boys, performed by Season 4 winner and the episode's guest panelist Lenni-Kalle Taipale as "Autopesu" (Car Wash).

Performances on the fifth episode
#	Stage name	Song	Identity	Result
1	Rascal	"Firestarter" by The Prodigy	Cristal Snow	OUT
2	Hoverfly	"USA" by Viivi	undisclosed	SAFE
3	Cow	"Mä tahtoo veivaa (I Like to Move It)" by Antti Pääkkönen	undisclosed	SAFE
4	Chameleon	"Bella ciao" by Goran Bregović	undisclosed	SAFE
5	Stray Dog	"Rise Like a Phoenix" by Conchita Wurst	Eero Ritala	OUT

=== Week 6 (11 October) ===
- Guest performance: "MC Koppakuoriainen" by Ella ja Aleksi, performed by Season 5 contestant and the episode's guest panelist Veronica Verho as "Suihkuverho" (Shower Curtain).

Performances on the sixth episode
#	Stage name	Song	Identity	Result
1	Fartman	"Larger than Life" by Backstreet Boys	undisclosed	SAFE
2	Spider	"Olet mun kaikuluotain" by Ville Valo	Satu Silvo	OUT
3	Mermaid	"Good Luck, Babe!" by Chappell Roan	undisclosed	SAFE
4	Old Man	"Paluu tulevaisuuteen" by JVG	undisclosed	SAFE
5	Shark	"Silakka-apajalla" by Veikko Lavi	undisclosed	SAFE

=== Week 7 (18 October) ===
Performances on the seventh episode
#	Stage name	Song	Identity	Result
1	Mermaid	"Electric" by Leila K	undisclosed	SAFE
2	Old Man	"Watermelon Sugar" by Harry Styles	undisclosed	SAFE
3	Shark	"Bailando" by Paradisio	undisclosed	SAFE
4	Fartman	"Shake It Off" by Taylor Swift	undisclosed	SAFE
5	Hoverfly	"Levoton Tuhkimo" by Dingo	Linnea Leino	OUT
6	Cow	"Party (papiidipaadi)" by Antti Tuisku feat. Nikke Ankara	undisclosed	SAFE
7	Chameleon	"Mon chéri" by Pilvi Hämäläinen	undisclosed	SAFE

=== Week 8 (25 October) ===
Performances on the eighth episode
#	Stage name	Song	Identity	Result
1	Cow	"7300 päivää" by DJ Oku Luukkainen & HesaÄijä feat. Erika Vikman & Danny	Miska Haakana	OUT
2	Fartman	"Heroes" by Måns Zelmerlöw	undisclosed	SAFE
3	Chameleon	"Mein Herz brennt" by Rammstein	undisclosed	SAFE
4	Shark	"Bara bada bastu" by KAJ	undisclosed	SAFE
5	Old Man	"Someone You Loved" by Lewis Capaldi	undisclosed	SAFE
6	Mermaid	"I Wanna Dance with Somebody (Who Loves Me)" by Whitney Houston	undisclosed	SAFE

=== Week 9 (1 November) – Halloween ===
- Guest performance: "Bloody Mary" by Lady Gaga, performed by Season 5 constestant and the episode's guest panelist Paula Noronen as "Toddler".

Performances on the ninth episode
#	Stage name	Song	Identity	Result
1	Mermaid	"B.Y.O.B." by System of a Down	undisclosed	SAFE
2	Chameleon	"The Show Must Go On" by Queen	Portion Boys	OUT
3	Shark	"Du hast" by Rammstein	undisclosed	SAFE
4	Fartman	"Con te partirò" by Andrea Bocelli	undisclosed	SAFE
5	Old Man	"Kung Fu taistelee" by Frederik	undisclosed	SAFE

=== Week 10 (8 November) ===
- Group performance: "The Greatest Show" from The Greatest Showman, performed by Ilkka Uusivuori, "Fartman", "Mermaid", "Old Man" and "Shark".

Performances on the tenth episode
#	Stage name	Song	Identity	Result
1	Fartman	"Ylivoimainen" by Kuumaa	undisclosed	SAFE
2	Old Man	"Sirkus" by Shrty	undisclosed	SAFE
3	Shark	"Vogue" by Madonna	undisclosed	SAFE
4	Mermaid	"Löytää mut" by Mirella	undisclosed	SAFE

=== Week 11 (15 November) – Duets ===
Performances on the eleventh episode
#	Stage name	Song	Duet partner	Identity	Result
1	Mermaid	"Hitaammin hautaan" by Nelli Matula	Nelli Matula	undisclosed	SAFE
2	Fartman	"Always" by Bon Jovi	Hanna Pakarinen	undisclosed	SAFE
3	Old Man	"Kelle mä soitan" by Ilta	Ilta	undisclosed	SAFE
4	Shark	"Taivaisiin" by Eini & Portion Boys	Portion Boys	Sonja Kailassaari	OUT

=== Week 12 (22 November) – Final ===
Performances on the twelfth episode
#	Stage name	Song	Identity	Result
Round One
1	Old Man	"Don't Stop Me Now" by Queen	undisclosed	SAFE
2	Mermaid	"Unstoppable" by Sia	Jannika B	THIRD
3	Fartman	"Dancing in the Dark" by Bruce Springsteen	undisclosed	SAFE
Round Two
4	Old Man	"Blue Suede Shoes" by Elvis Presley	Jarkko Tamminen	RUNNER-UP
5	Fartman	"Feel" by Robbie Williams	Sebastian Rejman	WINNER

== Season 8 ==
Stage name	Celebrity	Occupation	Episodes							
Stage name	Celebrity	Occupation	1	2	3	4	5	6	7	8
Faarao (Pharaoh)	TBA			SAFE		IMM (Note: All panelists used Poista maski but incorrectly guessed the celebrity's identity as Alexander Stubb, causing the celebrity to get immunity from elimination)		SAFE	SAFE	SAFE
Hurja Mangusti (Ferocious Mongoose)	TBA		SAFE		SAFE		SAFE		SAFE	SAFE
Myrkky (Toxin)	TBA			SAFE		SAFE		SAFE	SAFE	SAFE
Opossumi (Opossum)	TBA			SAFE		SAFE		SAFE	SAFE	SAFE
Räsynukke (Ragdoll)	TBA		SAFE		SAFE		SAFE		SAFE	SAFE
Kuoriainen (Beetle)	Lauri Mikkola	Singer	SAFE		SAFE		SAFE		SAFE	OUT
Vappu (Labor Day)	Sonja Lumme	Singer		SAFE		SAFE		SAFE	OUT	
Poppari (Popcorn)	Mikko Parikka	Actor		SAFE		SAFE		OUT		
Molli (A Minor)	Jukka Haapalainen	Dancer	SAFE		SAFE		OUT			
AI	Nelli Orell	Influencer	SAFE		SAFE		OUT			
Talkkari (Caretaker)	Mikko "Peltsi" Peltola	Reporter		SAFE		OUT				
Keiju (Fairy)	Eevi Teittinen	Personal trainer	SAFE		OUT					
Dingo	Sergey Hilman	Model		OUT						
Etsivä (Detective)	Seksikäs-Suklaa	YouTuber	OUT							

=== Week 1 (3 October) ===
Performances on the first episode
#	Stage name	Song	Identity	Result
1	Detective	"Party Rock Anthem" by LMFAO	Seksikäs-Suklaa	OUT
2	Fairy	"Yksinäisen keijun tarina" by Chisu	undisclosed	SAFE
3	A Minor	"Puhu hiljaa rakkaudesta" by Fredi	undisclosed	SAFE
4	AI	"Levitating" by Dua Lipa	undisclosed	SAFE
5	Ferocious Mongoose	"Son of a Preacher Man" by Dusty Springfield	undisclosed	SAFE
6	Ragdoll	"Liekinheitin" by Linda Lampenius and Pete Parkkonen	undisclosed	SAFE
7	Beetle	"Believer" by Imagine Dragons	undisclosed	SAFE

=== Week 2 (10 October) ===
Performances on the second episode
#	Stage name	Song	Identity	Result
1	Toxin	"Gasolina" by Daddy Yankee	undisclosed	SAFE
2	Pharaoh	"Mä hiihdän" by Antti Tuisku	undisclosed	SAFE
3	Labor Day	"Stop!" by Sam Brown	undisclosed	SAFE
4	Caretaker	"Takatukka" by Antti Paalanen	undisclosed	SAFE
5	Opossum	"Koirakaveri" by Heikki Kuula	undisclosed	SAFE
6	Dingo	"I Want It That Way" by Backstreet Boys	Sergey Hilman	OUT
7	Popcorn	"Wait and Bleed" by Slipknot	undisclosed	SAFE

=== Week 3 (17 October) ===
Performances on the third episode
#	Stage name	Song	Identity	Result
1	A Minor	"She Bangs" by Ricky Martin	undisclosed	SAFE
2	Ragdoll	"Golden" by Huntrix	undisclosed	SAFE
3	Ferocious Mongoose	"Don't Speak" by Gwen Stefani	undisclosed	SAFE
4	AI	"Menestys on paras tapa kostaa" by Ares	undisclosed	SAFE
5	Beetle	"Can't Hold Us" by Macklemore & Ryan Lewis feat. Ray Dalton	undisclosed	SAFE
6	Fairy	"Sankaritar" by Tiktak	Eevi Teittinen	OUT

=== Week 4 (24 October) ===
Performances on the fourth episode
#	Stage name	Song	Identity	Result
1	Opossum	"Wish I Had an Angel" by Nightwish	undisclosed	SAFE
2	Pharaoh	"Taikuri" by Turisti	undisclosed	IMM
3	Caretaker	"Mökkitie" by Arttu Wiskari	Mikko "Peltsi" Peltola	OUT
4	Popcorn	"We No Speak Americano" by Yolanda Be Cool & DCUP	undisclosed	SAFE
5	Labor Day	"Saving All My Love for You" by Whitney Houston	undisclosed	SAFE
6	Toxin	"Super Bass" by Nicki Minaj	undisclosed	SAFE

=== Week 5 (31 October) ===
Performances on the fifth episode
#	Stage name	Song	Identity	Result
1	Beetle	"Stayin' Alive" by Bee Gees	undisclosed	SAFE
2	A Minor	"I've Got You Under My Skin" by Frank Sinatra	Jukka Haapalainen	OUT
3	AI	"That's What I Like" by Bruno Mars	Nelli Orell	OUT
4	Ferocious Mongoose	"Bang Bang (My Baby Shot Me Down)" by Cher	undisclosed	SAFE
5	Ragdoll	"Where Is My Husband!" by Raye	undisclosed	SAFE

=== Week 6 (7 November) ===
Performances on the sixth episode
#	Stage name	Song	Identity	Result
1	Labor Day	"I Will Survive" by Gloria Gaynor	undisclosed	SAFE
2	Opossum	"Lössi" by Gettomasa	undisclosed	SAFE
3	Pharaoh	"Zitti e buoni" by Måneskin	undisclosed	SAFE
4	Popcorn	"Exile" by Taylor Swift	Mikko Parikka	OUT
5	Toxin	"Bäng bäng typerä sydän" by Ellinoora	undisclosed	SAFE

=== Week 7 (14 November) ===
Performances on the seventh episode
#	Stage name	Song	Identity	Result
1	Ferocious Mongoose	"Oops!... I Did It Again" by Britney Spears	undisclosed	SAFE
2	Pharaoh	"Pure mua" by Meiju Suvas	undisclosed	SAFE
3	Toxin	"Left Outside Alone" by Anastacia	undisclosed	SAFE
4	Labor Day	"Conga" by Miami Sound Machine & Gloria Estefan	Sonja Lumme	OUT
5	Opossum	"Kaikista kasvoista" by Anna Eriksson	undisclosed	SAFE
6	Ragdoll	"Jump" by Kris Kross	undisclosed	SAFE
7	Beetle	"O sole mio" by Eduardo di Capua	undisclosed	SAFE

=== Week 8 (21 November) ===
Performances on the eighth episode
#	Stage name	Song	Identity	Result
1	Opossum	"Midnight Sun" by Zara Larsson	undisclosed	SAFE
2	Beetle	"Kesäyö" by Pariisin Kevät	Lauri Mikkola	OUT
3	Pharaoh	"Blinding Lights" by The Weeknd	undisclosed	SAFE
4	Toxin	"Vill ha dej" by Drömhus	undisclosed	SAFE
5	Ferocious Mongoose	"Luotan tulevaan" by Kuumaa	undisclosed	SAFE
6	Ragdoll	"Tähdet" by AHTI & Behm	undisclosed	SAFE

== Specials ==
=== Masked Singer Suomi: Pelastakaa Lasten joulu (23 November 2024) ===
At the end of the sixth season, a Christmas special was aired on 23 November 2024. The special was organized together with Pelastakaa Lapset (Save the Children Finland).

Along with three new characters, the episode launched a Christmas fundraising for poor families.

Stage name	Celebrity	Occupation	Episodes
Stage name	Celebrity	Occupation	1
Poro (Reindeer)	Olli Herman	Singer	WINNER
Lumiukko (Snowman)	Laura Voutilainen	Singer	RUNNER-UP
Joulukuusi (Christmas Tree)	Alma Hätönen	Presenter	THIRD

- Opening performance: "Tämä maailma tarvitsee rakkautta" by Suvi Teräsniska.

Performances on the Christmas episode
#	Stage name	Song	Identity	Result
Round One
1	Snowman	"Talven ihmemaa" by Laila Kinnunen	undisclosed	SAFE
2	Christmas Tree	"Last Christmas" by Wham!	Alma Hätönen	THIRD
3	Reindeer	"Walking in the Air" by Howard Blake & Peter Auty	undisclosed	SAFE
Round Two
1	Snowman	"Joulun kanssas jaan" by Haloo Helsinki! feat. Cantores Minores	Laura Voutilainen	RUNNER-UP
2	Reindeer	"Petteri Punakuono" by Raskasta Joulua	Olli Herman	WINNER

=== Masked Singer Suomi: Pelastakaa Lasten joulu (29 November 2025) ===
At the end of the seventh season, a Christmas special was aired on 29 November 2025. As with the previous season, the special was organized together with Pelastakaa Lapset (Save the Children Finland).

Along with three new characters, the episode launched a Christmas fundraising for poor families.

Stage name	Celebrity	Occupation	Episodes
Stage name	Celebrity	Occupation	1
Kynttilä (Candle)	Saara Aalto	Singer	WINNER
Lahjasäkki (Sack of Presents)	Konsta Hietanen	Musician	RUNNER-UP
Pipari (Cookie)	Krista Kosonen	Actress	THIRD

- Opening performance: "Run Rudolph Run" by Olli Herman.

Performances on the Christmas episode
#	Stage name	Song	Identity	Result
Round One
1	Cookie	"Kun Joulupukki suukon sai" by Tommie Connor & Saukki	Krista Kosonen	THIRD
2	Sack of Presents	"Sylvian Joululaulu" by Zachris Topelius & Karl Collan	undisclosed	SAFE
3	Candle	"Joulupukki matkaan jo käy" byJ. Fred Coots, Haven Gillespie & Saukki	undisclosed	SAFE
Round Two
1	Sack of Presents	"It's Beginning to Look a Lot Like Christmas" by Meredith Willson	Konsta Hietanen	RUNNER-UP
2	Candle	"Let It Go" by Robert Lopez & Kristen Anderson-Lopez	Saara Aalto	WINNER
