= Juurikkala =

Juurikkala is a Finnish surname. Notable people with the surname include:

- Kaija Juurikkala (born 1959), Finnish film director and screenwriter
- Ville Juurikkala (born 1980), Finnish photographer and music video director, son of Kaija
