= Maria Veitola =

Finnish journalist

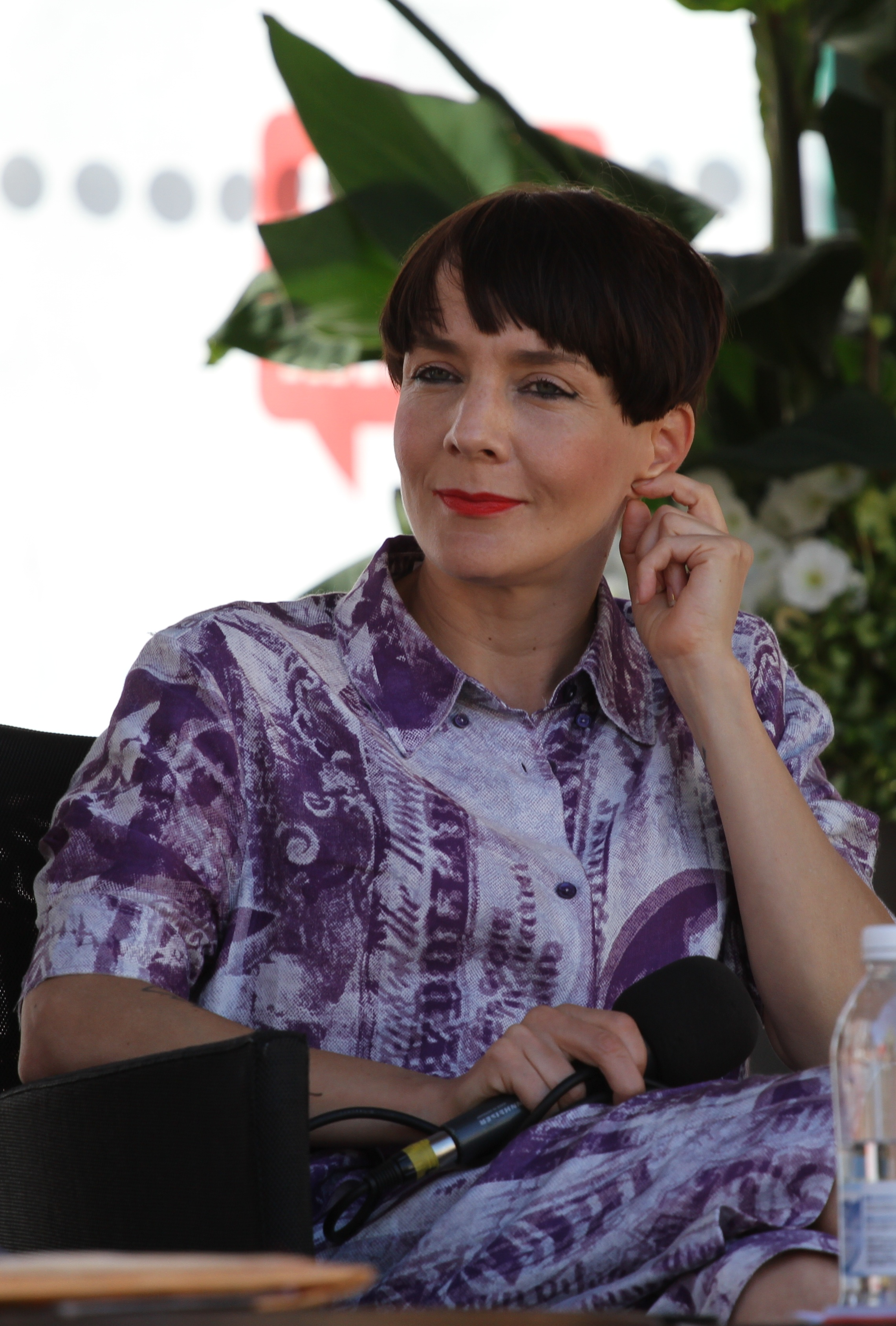
- Maria Veitola in 2014 in Pori
- Born: 26 February 1973 (age 53); Eno, Finland
- Occupations: Television host; screenwriter; journalist
- Years active: 1994-present

Maria Aleksandra Veitola (born 26 February 1973) is a Finnish journalist, screenwriter, talk show host and TV and radio host. She is one of the most prominent figures in Finnish entertainment and has appeared in multiple TV shows on commercial channels MTV3 and Nelonen.

Veitola was born in the small municipality of Eno in Finnish province North Karelia but spent her youth in Imatra in South Karelia. After moving to Helsinki in early 1990s she began her career in 1994 in Radio City as a radio host and continued in Radio Helsinki in 2000. Her first TV program was her own talk show Maria! on Nelonen from 2008 to 2011. From 2016 to 2018 she hosted a talkshow called Enbuske, Veitola & Salminen along with Tuomas Enbuske and Roope Salminen.

She became the director of Radio Helsinki in 2013, a position which she retained until 2016. Since 2015 she has had a popular TV show Yökylässä Maria Veitola ("A sleepover with Maria Veitola") where she spends two days and one night with prominent figures in Finland as a houseguest. Her famous sleepover hosts include Juha Sipilä, Sanna Marin, Antti Rinne, Päivi Räsänen, Vappu Pimiä and Sofi Oksanen, among others. Since March 2020 Veitola has also been one of the panelists in Masked Singer Suomi.

Veitola is an outspoken feminist. She has published two books, Veitola in 2018 and Toisinpäin in 2019.
