= Ville Juurikkala =

Finnish photographer and music video director

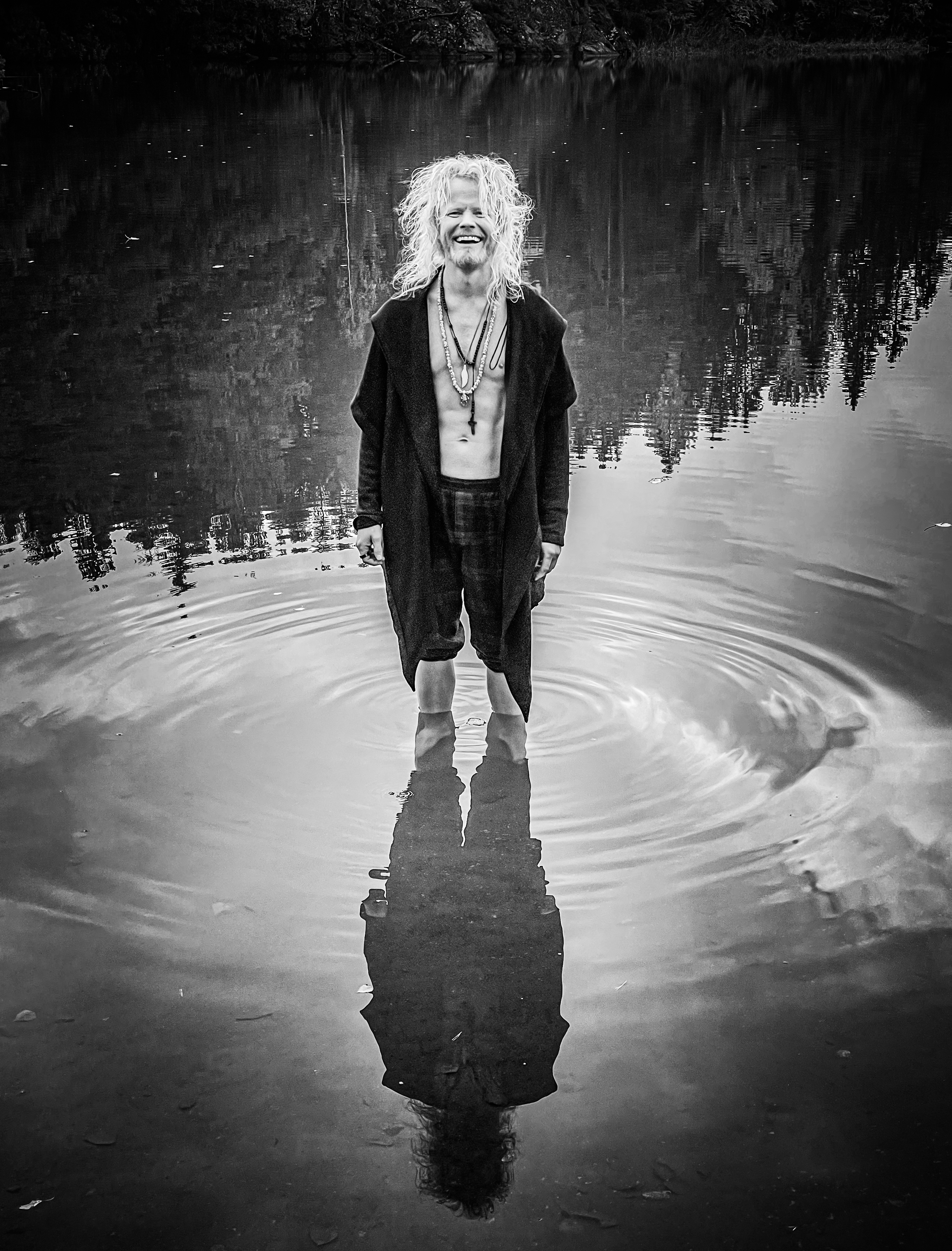
- Ville Juurikkala in 2022
- Born: Ville Akseli Juurikkala; 6 March 1980 (age 46); Lohja, Finland
- Occupations: Photographer; music video director; public speaker; author
- Years active: 1999–present
- Parent: Kaija Juurikkala (mother)
- Website: villejuurikkala.com

Signature
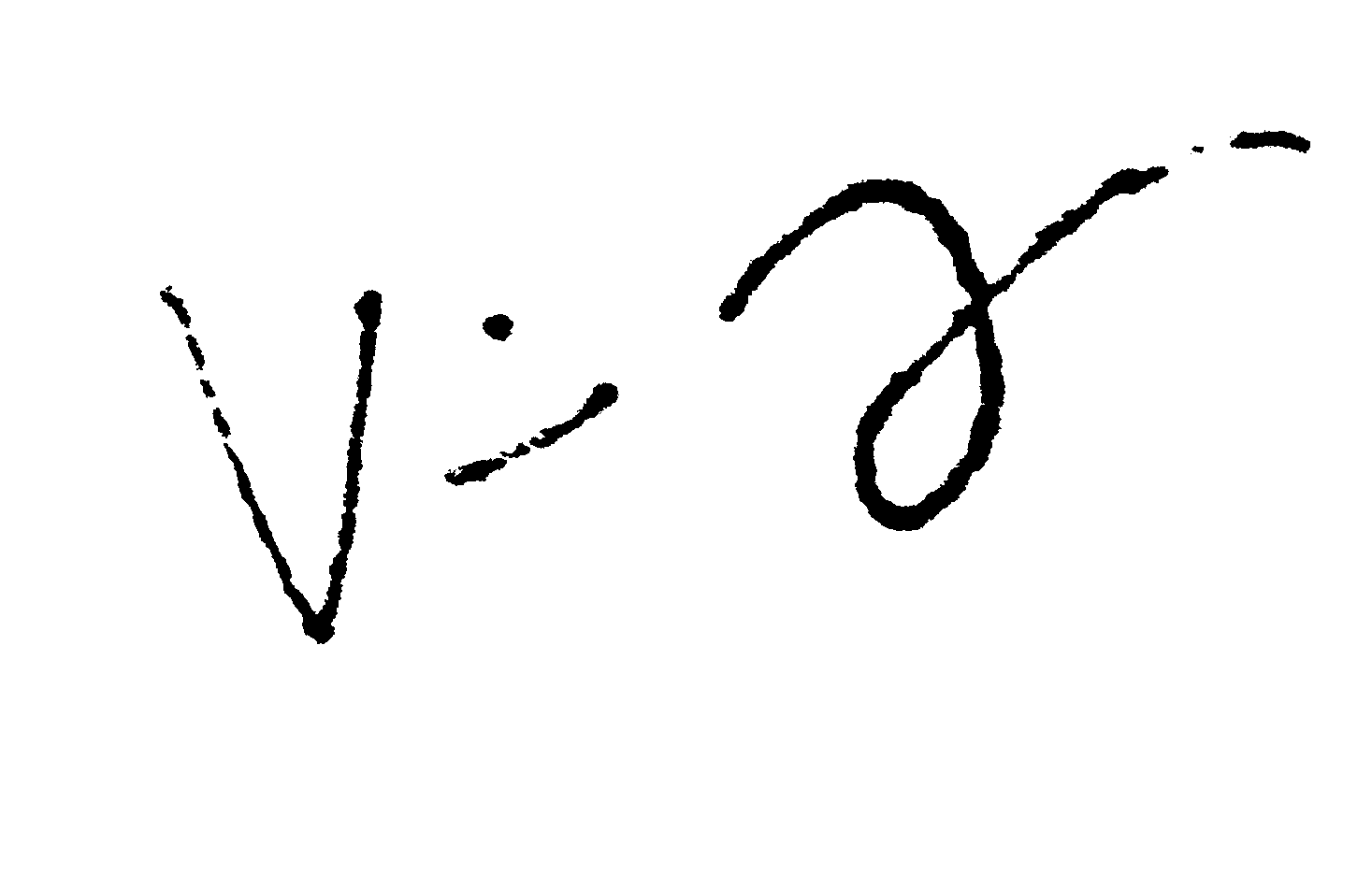

Ville Akseli Juurikkala (born 6 March 1980) is a Finnish photographer, music video director, public speaker and author. He is best known as a "rock photographer", having had a long working relationship with bands such as HIM, Nightwish and Apocalyptica. Other notable figures Juurikkala has worked with include Mika Häkkinen, Andrea Bocelli and Ban Ki-moon. He has also illustrated several books.

During his career, Ville Juurikkala has been awarded several times. He is also the first Finnish photographer to have his work featured at the prestigious Morrison Hotel Gallery.

== Early life ==
Ville Akseli Juurikkala was born 6 March 1980 in Lohja, Finland. His mother is film director Kaija Juurikkala, while his father Matti Tukiainen worked for the Central Organisation of Finnish Trade Unions. Juurikkala also has a younger brother Oskari Juurikkala, who is a priest and a member of the Opus Dei movement.

After his parents' divorce, Juurikkala moved to Vantaa with his mother and brother. At age ten, Juurikkala took up keyboards, but switched to guitar six months later having been inspired by Guns N' Roses and Metallica. As a teenager, Juurikkala played in several different bands. He also worked as a lighting technician on several films and television productions. He also acted in his mother's films Rosa Was Here and Taking Moses for a Ride. Juurikkala was interested in a career in film, but was encouraged to first familiarize himself with photography. At age sixteen, Juurikkala took up photography and began to like it more than film.

After gymnasium, Juurikkala applied to the University of Art and Design Helsinki, but was rejected.

== Career ==
=== Photography ===
Juurikkala initially worked as a commercial and portrait photographer, until he was hired as a freelancer by City magazine. Through City, he got his first chance to illustrate a book, when Helsinki restaurant Papà Giovanni needed a photographer for their cook book. During the early 2000s, Juurikkala also worked for the magazines Suosikki, Soundi and Katso. This introduced him to several different bands and artists.

Juurikkala shot his first album cover for Darude's second record Rush. In 2005, he was asked to join The 69 Eyes on tour as their photographer. This resulted in a book titled Route 69 – a Photographic Journey with The 69 Eyes, which was published in 2006. Juurikkala soon found work with other bands and artists as well, including HIM and Hanoi Rocks. Nightwish and Apocalyptica have also released photography books shot by Juurikkala. In 2007, he was named City's Best Rock Photographer by City magazine. He also won the Kultajyvä–prize and was awarded at the Vuoden huiput ceremony the same year.

In 2008, Good Charlotte's lead singer Joel Madden asked Juurikkala to join the band on tour as their photographer. The collaboration soon led to Juurikkala moving to Los Angeles, where he worked with Kat Von D and Chester Bennington among others. He also shot the cover for Slash's album Live in Manchester, which was released in 2010. Other prominent figures Juurikkala has since worked with include Secretary-General of the United Nations Ban Ki-moon, Formula One World Champion Mika Häkkinen and opera singer Andrea Bocelli.

In 2015, Juurikkala's work was on display at the It's Only Rock'n Roll exhibition, which was held at the Tiketti Galleria in Helsinki. Some of the pieces were later included in the Sinä & Minä portrait exhibition at the Vantaa Art Museum Artsi. In 2017, the Helsinki Art Museum held an exhibition titled HIM: Right Here In My Eyes, which featured Juurikkala's newly shot photographs of HIM preparing for their farewell tour. The exhibition was later also held at the prestigious Morrison Hotel Gallery in New York City, which specializes in rock photography. Juurikkala is the first Finnish photographer to be featured by the Gallery.

Juurikkala has also worked as a still photographer on films, such as Keisarikunta, Ganes and Imaginaerum. He also works as portrait and nature photographer. In 2019, Juurikka illustrated the book Metsässä – Uppoudu metsään, itseesi ja elämään by Jarko Taivasmaa. An exhibition of the same name was held at the Espoo Culture Center in September of that year. Juurikkala's work with The 69 Eyes was also on display at Finland's Motorcycle Museum in September.

Juurikkala's autobiography Irti – Hollywoodista Santiagon tielle was released on 18 April 2024.

=== Directing ===
Juurikkala directed his first music video in 2007 for the song "Black Ice" by Hanna Pakarinen. In 2012, he was asked to direct the music video for The Voice of Finland finalist Jesse Kaikuranta's song "Vie mut kotiin". Since then Juurikkala has directed several music videos for various Finnish bands and artists. Michael Monroe, Santa Cruz and Jonne Aaron are among his most frequent collaborators. Juurikkala's video for Michael Monroe's "Ballad of the Lower East Side" won the audience poll at the 2013 Oulu Music Video Festival. The music video for Lauri Tähkä's "Mä en pelkää" was nominated for Music Video of the Year at the 2018 Emma Gala. Juurikkala has also directed videos for Bullet for My Valentine and Amaranthe.

In 2011, Juurikkala and Jan-Olof Svarvar directed the documentary Lakeuksilta Hollywoodiin, which is based on musician and producer Jimmy Westerlund.

== Style and influences ==
Among Ville Juuriikkala's biggest influences are Bob Gruen and Anton Corbijn. His visual style has its roots in cross processing, a popular technique during the 1990s. When Juurikkala began working as a professional photographer, cross processing was not as widely used anymore. Still Juurikkala has stayed true to his visual style, stating: "This is what I want to do. It's not trendy, doesn't bother me." For Juurikkala the most essential part of his work is "getting close to the person, and then getting that presence across to other people." In regards to his shooting style, Juurikkala has stated: "My tonal palette is quite rock in its starkness, but I also strive for a certain painting-like-look with my colors. Maybe it's because I can't paint. The compositions and poses aren't very rock most of the time. Maybe it's this slight dichotomy that brings something extra to my shots."

== Personal life ==
From 2008 to 2011, Juurikkala lived in Los Angeles. In 2010, he began to feel burnt out, and announced that he'd be going on a two-month trip to the Santiago de Compostela pilgrimage from France to Spain. During his journey, all of Juurikkala's possessions were stolen, so he slept in the woods and with the homeless. Despite this, Juurikkala stated: "I had never been so happy. I realized that success and material possessions didn't bring deep joy. For most of us, success and material possessions breathe expectation and fear. Having lost everything, there was nothing left to lose. Nothing to fear, nothing to expect. In its place was this moment. A deep joy of just being – here and now." Eventually Juurikkala's mother flew him back to Finland. At the same time he decided to quit drinking, and in 2012 he moved back to Finland.

In August 2006, an inebriated Juurikkala married a Las Vegas stripper. The marriage was later dissolved.

In 2012, Juurikkala met his future wife Noora, who is an interior designer. They have three children together: Valtteri, Lilja and Maija. The Juurikkalas lived in Lohja from 2016 to 2019. Before that, they lived in Kirkkonummi, and later in Los Angeles. In 2019, they moved to Lahti, and from there to Porvoo. Ville and Noora Juurikkala separated in late 2019.

== Bibliography ==
- Suorsa, Pekka; Eskelinen, Matti; Linso, Sampsa; Juurikkala, Ville; Löfving, Magnus (2002). Papà Giovanni – Aitoa elämää. WSOY. ISBN 951-026-665-5.
- Manninen, Katri; Holmala, Eija; Juurikkala, Ville (2005). Sinä onnistut – Tehokiinteys. Gummerus. ISBN 951-206-398-0.
- Juurikkala, Ville; The 69 Eyes (2006). Route 69 – a Photographic Journey with The 69 Eyes. Like. ISBN 952-471-875-8.
- Juurikkala, Ville; Holopainen, Tuomas (2008). Nightwish: Dark Passion Gallery. Scene Nation. ISBN 978-952-924-341-9.
- Juurikkala, Ville (2011). Apocalyptica: Photobook. Halbe Miete Management. ISBN 978-952-929-453-4.
- Nightwish; Harju, Stobe; Juurikkala, Ville (2011). 16042 Days of Imaginaerum. Like. ISBN 978-952-010-833-5.
- Kiiveri, Anu; Jyrki 69; Juurikkala, Ville (2016). Rock 'n' Roll Juicer. Like. ISBN 978-952-01-1350-6.
- Taivasmaa, Jarko; Juurikkala, Ville (2019). Metsässä – Uppoudu metsään itseesi ja elämään. Otava. ISBN 978-951-133-379-1.
- Juurikkala, Ville (2024). Irti – Hollywoodista Santiagon tielle. Like. ISBN 978-951-137-041-3.

== Filmography ==
=== Documentaries ===
- Lakeuksilta Hollywoodiin (2011)

=== Music videos ===
Year	Song	Artist	Ref.
2007	"Black Ice"	Hanna Pakarinen	
2008	"Mustat sydämet"	51koodia	
2012	"Vie mut kotiin"	Jesse Kaikuranta	
2013	"Koko kuva"	Irina	
2013	"Jokapäiväinen"	Hanna Pakarinen	
2013	"Anna jotain"	Nimetön	
2013	"The Ballad of the Lower East Side"	Michael Monroe	
2013	"Taivas itkee hiljaa"	Jonne Aaron	
2013	"So Happy I Could Die"	Reckless Love	
2013	"Ruostunut ankkuri"	Antti Railio	
2013	"Stained Glass Heart"	Michael Monroe	
2013	"Sinä ja hän"	Happoradio	
2014	"Jääkausi"	Jannika B	
2014	"Mä tahdon tietää mitä rakkaus on"	Stina Girs	
2014	"Tanssimalla"	Olli Helenius	
2014	"We Are the Ones to Fall"	Santa Cruz	
2014	"Only One"	Aste	
2014	"Itseni herra"	Jannika B	
2014	"Platinaa"	Janne Ordén	
2014	"Jekyll ja Hyde"	U.G.H.	
2014	"Tanssi pois paha"	Elonkerjuu	
2014	"Yksin"	Jonne Aaron	
2014	"Wasted and Wounded"	Santa Cruz	
2014	"Enemmän kuin ystäviä"	Stina Girs	
2014	"Sininen sunnuntai"	Neljä Ruusua	
2015	"Ota mut"	Jonne Aaron	
2015	"Emmauksen tiellä"	Kotiteollisuus	
2015	"My Remedy"	Santa Cruz	
2015	"Kuolevainen"	Johanna Kurkela	
2015	"Sinun vuorosi loistaa"	Juha Tapio	
2015	"Old King's Road"	Michael Monroe	
2015	"Plastic World"	Entwine	
2015	"Sunglasses at Night"	The Local Band	
2015	"I Am the Antidote"	Lost Society	
2016	"Jet Fighter Plane"	The 69 Eyes	
2016	"Monster"	Reckless Love	
2016	"Goin' Down with the Ship"	Michael Monroe	
2016	"Dolce Vita"	The 69 Eyes	
2016	"Knowing Me, Knowing You"	MGT feat. Ville Valo	
2016	"Battery"	Apocalyptica	
2016	"The Urge"	SAARA	
2016	"California"	SAARA	
2016	"Aces High"	Steve 'n' Seagulls	
2016	"Don't Wait Up"	Takida	
2016	"The End (Easier Than Love)"	Ancara	
2016	"Life"	Sonata Arctica	
2016	"Don't Need You"	Bullet for My Valentine	
2016	"Don't Fit In"	Rosecraft	
2016	"Korkeella"	Habio feat. Paleface	
2016	"Juhli elämää"	Sampsa Astala	
2017	"Indelible Heroes"	Brother Firetribe	
2017	"Apologize"	One Desire	
2017	"Maximize"	Amaranthe	
2017	"Kaikki mitä rakastin"	Leo	
2017	"Feeling High"	Toni-Marie Iommi	
2017	"Christmas in New York City"	The 69 Eyes	
2018	"Alone Against All"	Blind Channel	
2018	"Sharks Love Blood"	Blind Channel	
2018	"All of Me"	Ipa	
2018	"Mä en pelkää"	Lauri Tähkä	
2018	"Naurettava"	Ilta	
2018	"Mul on sut"	Leo feat. Janna	
2018	"John"	Juha Tapio	
2019	"Palavaa vettä"	Lauri Tähkä	
2019	"Timantti"	Mikko Harju	
2019	"Distorted Emotions"	Temple Balls	
2019	"Liberta"	White Cloud Fire feat. Michael Monroe	
2019	"Tiikerin raidat"	Jonne Aaron	
2019	"Drive It Like You Stole It"	Smackbound	
2019	"Testify"	Santa Cruz	
2019	"Ashes of the Modern World"	Apocalyptica	
2019	"Kultaa"	Leo	
2019	"Helvetti"	Niko Tiuraniemi	
2020	"Greta"	Ahti	
2020	"After You're Gone"	One Desire	
2020	"Live or Die"	Apocalyptica feat. Joakim Brodén	
2020	"Shadowman"	One Desire	
2020	"When It's Time"	Altamullan Road	
2020	"Uuden edessä"	Toivon kärki	
2020	"Tässäkö tää oli?"	Arttu Wiskari feat. Leavings-Orkesteri	
2020	"Night Drive"	Brother Firetribe	
2020	"Me mennään tän läpi"	Antti Ketonen	
2020	"Strong"	Amaranthe feat. Noora Louhimo	
2020	"Broken Into Pieces"	Shiraz Lane	
2020	"En haluu vajoo"	Sampsa Astala	
2020	"Super Mario"	Happoradio	
2021	"Suudellaan"	Samae Koskinen	
2021	"Kipee"	Antti Tuisku	
2021	"Moonchild"	Santa Cruz	
2021	"Aavikko"	Lauri Tähkä	
2021	"Crossfire"	Santa Cruz	
2021	"Jos et olis siinä"	Happoradio	
2021	"Oon nähny unta"	Mikko Harju	
2021	"Maa joka kantaa"	Antti Ketonen	
2021	"Maksniemi"	Niko Tiuranniemi	
2021	"Keskiyön Cowboy"	Lauri Tähkä	
2021	"Dig a Hole in the Meadow"	Jake and Rambling Blade	
2021	"Hetkessä"	Rände	
2021	"Tämä maailma tarvitsee rakkautta"	Suvi Teräsniska	
2022	"Tampere"	Niko Tiuraniemi	
2022	"Sytytä mut"	Antti Ketonen	
2022	"Dark Energy"	Serpico	
2022	"Piste"	Mariska	
2022	"Hetken tässä kaikes on järkee"	Elastinen feat. Johanna Kurkela	
2022	"Elää"	Mikko Harju	
2022	"Can't Stop Falling Apart"	Michael Monroe	
2022	"Kun tuuli puhaltaa"	Mustat Ruusut	
2022	"Everybody's Nobody"	Michael Monroe	
2022	"Bad Seed"	Erja Lyytinen	
2022	"Last Girl"	Erja Lyytinen	
2022	"Waiting for the Daylight"	Erja Lyytinen	
2022	"Derelict Palace"	Michael Monroe	
2023	"I Live Too Fast to Die Young"	Michael Monroe	
2023	"Live Your Life"	Saving Jack	
2023	"Tokio"	Mustat Ruusut	
2023	"Savon preeria"	Olli Halonen	
2024	”Miten käärmeet lisääntyy”	Olli Halonen	
2024	”Liekki”	Eve	
2024	”Iltaisin”	Pasi Mikael	

== Awards and nominations ==
Year	Nominee / work	Award	Institution or publication	Result	Ref.
2007	Ville Juurikkala	Kaupungin paras Rock-kuvaaja	City	Won	
2007	Young Director Award Poster	Hopeahuippu	Vuoden huiput	Won	
2007	Young Director Award Poster	Kultajyvä	Suomen Markkinointiliitto	Won	
2013	Michael Monroe – "The Ballad of the Lower East Side"	Kansanpumpeli	Oulu Music Video Festival	Won	
2018	Lauri Tähkä – "Mä en pelkää"	Vuoden musiikkivideo	Emma Gala	Nominated	
