= 22 m² =

2013 studio album by Sini Sabotage

22 m^{2}

Studio album by Sini Sabotage
- Released: 5 December 2013
- Label: Warner Music Finland & PME Records
- Producer: DJPP

Singles from 22 m^{2}
- 1. "Levikset repee" Released: 19 April 2013; 2. "Miks" Released: 1 November 2013

22 m^{2} is the debut studio album by Finnish rapper Sini Sabotage. Released on 5 December 2013 via PME Records, the album peaked at number 27 on the Finnish Albums Chart.

== Singles ==
Two singles preceded the album. "Levikset repee", released on 19 April 2013, peaked at number one on the Finnish Singles Chart. The second single "Miks" was released on 1 November 2013 and reached number 14.

== Track listing ==
No.	Title	Length
1.	"Levikset repee" (featuring VilleGalle)	3:21
2.	"Miks"	3:38
3.	"Luotolle on uus musta"	3:40
4.	"Mun heinii" (featuring Kube)	3:03
5.	"Mitä pitäis tehdä" (featuring Asa)	3:20
6.	"Mun planeetta"	3:11
7.	"Henkarii perään" (featuring Goucci)	3:38
8.	"Lambada"	3:36
9.	"Sun ralli" (featuring Hätä-Miikka)	3:22
10.	"Tunne mun liikkeet"	3:43
11.	"Kukaan ei saa tietää" (featuring Kari Tapiiri)	3:58

== Charts ==
Chart (2013)	Peak position
Finnish Albums (Suomen virallinen lista)	27

== Release history ==
Region	Date	Format	Label
Finland	5 December 2013	CD, digital download	Warner Music Finland & PME Records
