= Miks (song) =

Single by Sini Sabotage

from the album 22 m²
- Released: 1 November 2013
- Genre: Rap
- Length: 3:38
- Label: Warner Music Finland & PME Records
- Songwriters: Ville-Petteri Galle, Perttu Mäkelä, Sini Sabotage Jaakko Salovaara, Jare Joakim Brand, DJPP
- Producers: DJPP, Jaakko Salovaara

Sini Sabotage singles chronology
"Levikset repee" (2013)	"Miks" (2013)

Music video
- "Miks" on YouTube

"Miks" is the second single by Finnish rapper Sini Sabotage from her debut album 22 m². Released on 1 November 2013, the song peaked at number 14 on the Finnish Singles Chart.

== Chart performance ==
Chart	Peak position
Finland (Suomen virallinen lista)	14
