= Kari Tykkyläinen =

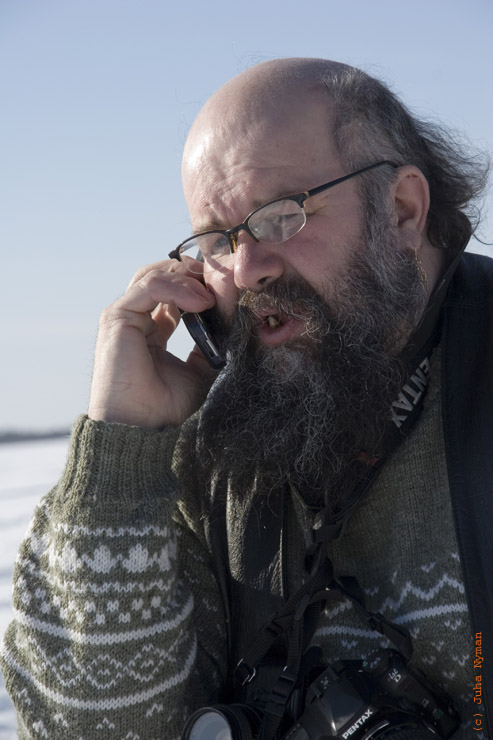
Kari Tykkyläinen.

Kari Ahti Ilmari Tykkyläinen (Finnish pronunciation: [ˈkɑri ˈɑhti ˈilmɑri ˈtykːylæi̯nen]; born 9 July 1953 in Eno) is a Finnish sculptor and video artist. He currently lives in the town of Pudasjärvi in Finland. In 2011, he ran for the Finnish parliamentary election, but was not elected.

Tykkyläinen studied and obtained his diploma at the Karjasillan Koulu in Oulu in 1973. He also studied at the Kankaanpään Taidekoulu school of art between 1976 and 1979; he is also a member of the Suomen Kuvanveistäjäliitto, or the Association of Finnish Sculptors. Tykkyläinen is married to fellow artist Marja-Leena Tykkyläinen.

== YouTube career ==
Tykkyläinen has made a name for himself on the internet by way of his YouTube account under the username Tykylevits. His first video lannistumaton ("adamant") from late 2007 depicts him beating himself with a Kaleva newspaper due to his frustration with a fellow worker of the Pudasjärvi civil service. The video was for a time among the top ten most watched videos on YouTube.

In 2013 Tykkyläinen filmed himself playing guitar and singing the song "My Way", which he then uploaded to YouTube. Volkswagen bought the rights to the audio of the clip for 1 650 euros.
