= Eno railway station =

Railway station in Joensuu, Finland

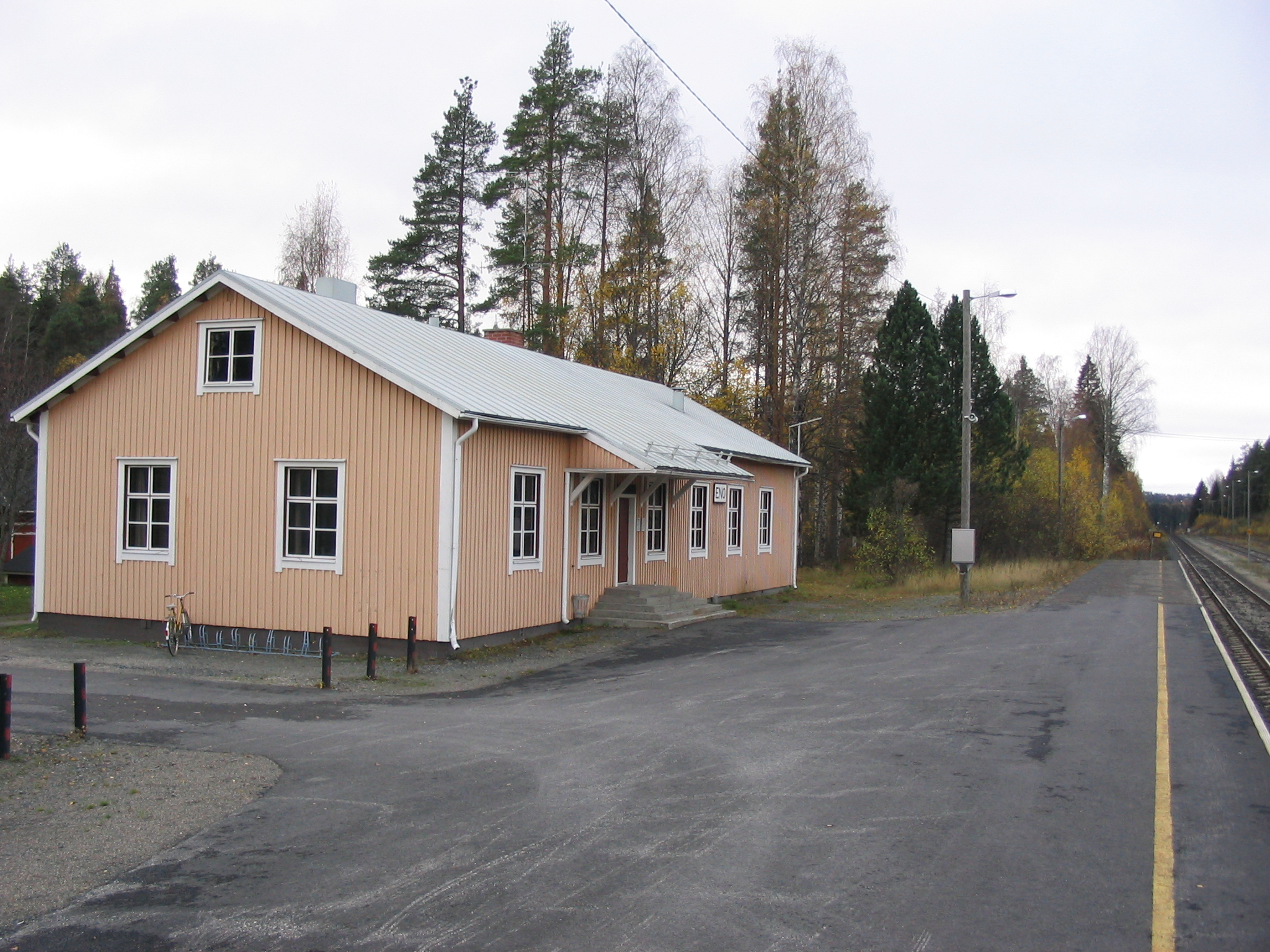
- Eno railway station in October 2006

General information
- Location: Finland
- Coordinates: 62.80637°N 30.14206°E
- Operator: VR Group
- Platforms: 1
- Tracks: 2
- Train operators: VR

Construction
- Parking: Gravel parking lot, no designated spaces
- Cycle facilities: Bike rack for about 20 bikes
- Accessible: Yes

Other information
- Station code: Eno

History
- Opened: 1941

Services
4 Services, 2 to Joensuu and 2 to Nurmes
Location

Eno railway station is situated in Eno, North Karelia, Finland. This rural station is the first stop north of Joensuu station on the VR railway line between Joensuu and Nurmes. The station is normally only served by two passenger trains each way every day. The station has no ticket machines.

== See also ==
- VR (Finnish Railways)
