= Roman Schatz =

Finnish writer (born 1960)

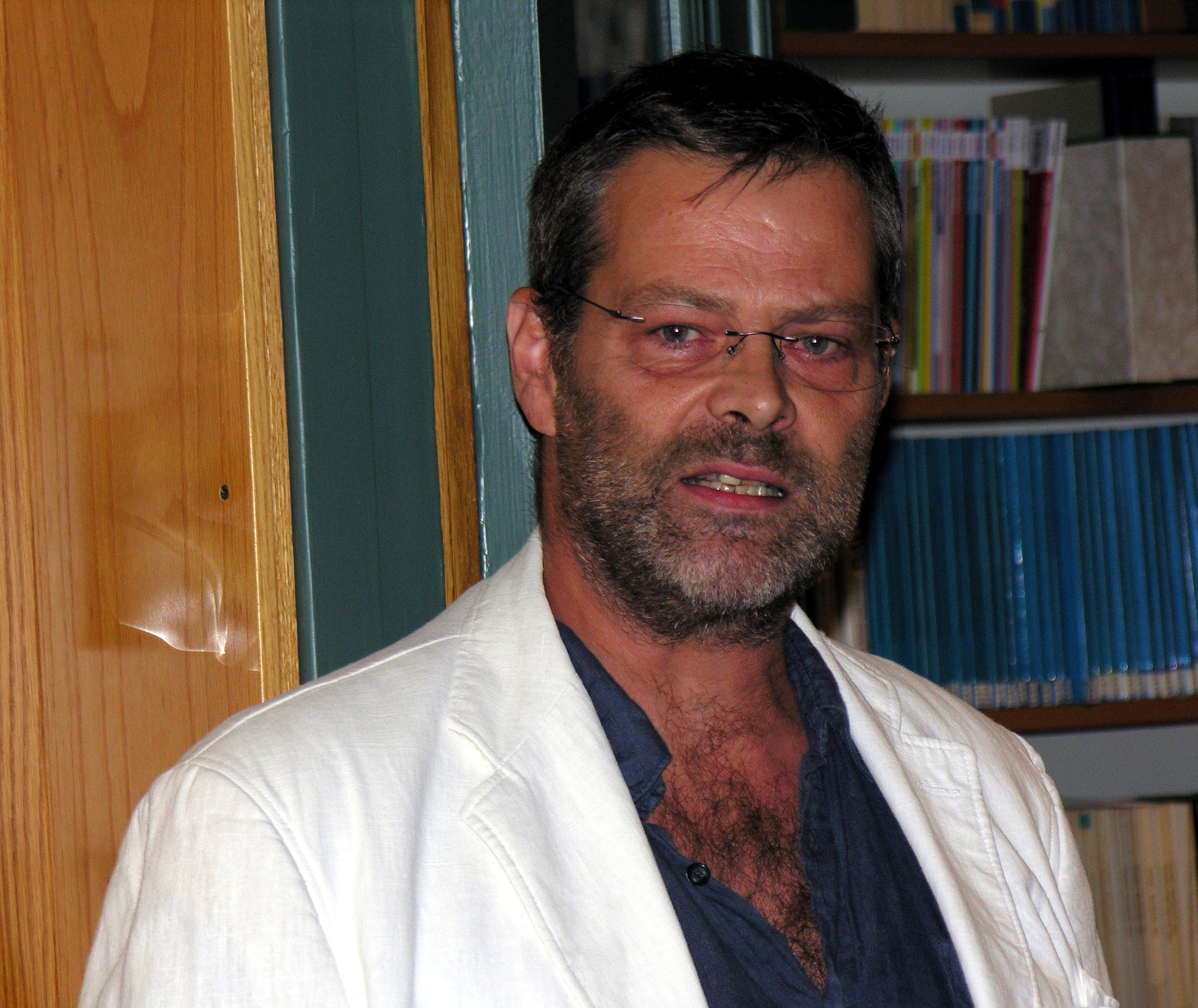
- Born: 21 August 1960 (age 65); Überlingen
- Occupation: Writer, non-fiction writer, actor, television director, television producer
- Citizenship: Finland, Germany

Roman Schatz (born 21 August 1960) is a German-born Finnish journalist and author. He was born in Überlingen, Baden-Württemberg, West Germany. He has written more than two dozen books, many of which have also been published in Germany. His first book was called From Finland with love – Suomesta rakkaudella.

Schatz translates, gives talks, hosts events and writes columns for Finnish newspapers and magazines. He has hosted his own TV series, Toisten TV, and appeared on various other TV shows and in movies (e.g. The Border, Better than Andy, Rottatouille). Since 2013, Schatz has hosted his own radio show, Roman Schatzin Maamme-kirja, on Yle Radio 1 of the Finnish Broadcasting Company.

Schatz met the Finnish woman who would later become his first wife in Berlin in 1986. Later that same year he emigrated to Finland. In 2012, Schatz became a Finnish citizen and thus holds dual citizenship.

Schatz has three children from two former marriages. He resides in Helsinki.

== Selected works ==
- Schmid, Max & Schatz, Roman: Finnland (Luzern: Reich, 1993) – ISBN 3-7243-0295-9
- From Finland with love – Suomesta, rakkaudella (Helsinki: Johnny Kniga, 2005) – ISBN 951-0-30415-8
- Rakasta minut (Helsinki: WSOY, 2006) – ISBN 978-951-0-31763-1
- € (Helsinki: WSOY, 2007) – ISBN 978-951-0-33024-1
- Der König von Helsinki (Frankfurt am Main: Eichborn, 2007) – ISBN 978-3-8218-5836-4
- Pravda. The truth about the Leningrad Cowboys (Helsinki: WSOY, 2008) – ISBN 978-951-0-34595-5
- Telewischn! (Frankfurt am Main: Eichborn, 2009) – ISBN 978-3-8218-5838-8
- Berliini. Oppaana Roman Schatz (Helsinki: WSOY, 2012) – ISBN 978-951-0-38307-0
- Voi maamme Suomi / Finland, what a country (Helsinki: WSOY, 2014) – ISBN 978-951-0-40527-7
- Gebrauchsanweisung für Finnland (München: Piper, 2014) – ISBN 978-3-492-27581-1
- Asevelipuolet (Helsinki: Gummerus, 2017) – ISBN 978-951-24-0653-1
