= Ella ja Aleksi =

- Origin: Finland
- Genres: Children's music
- Years active: 2004–present
- Website: ellajaaleksi.fi (broken as of 2019)

Ella ja Aleksi is a Finnish rap duo consisting of two four-year-old children. The project was founded in 2004 by Markus Koskinen of the band Teleks and Sampo Haapaniemi of Egotrippi. It released an album named Lenni Lokinpoikanen (Lenni the Baby Seagull) which went platinum (30,000 sold copies) and stayed on the top four of the Finnish charts for four weeks. The latest album is Takapihan tavikset (Backyard Ordinary People) from 2009. The band's lyrics are about human relations, family, and close surroundings. For example, the lyrics of the radio hit MC Koppakuoriainen (MC Beetle) are about the importance of parenting and not bullying others.

== Discography ==
- Lenni Lokinpoikanen (2004)
- Kolme muskettisopulia (2005)
- Talventörröttäjä (2008)
- Takapihan tavikset (2009)
