= Constantinos Mavromichalis =

Finnish actor (born 1987)

- Born: 5 March 1987 (age 39); Helsinki, Finland

Constantinos ”Gogi” Mavromichalis (Greek: Κωνσταντίνος Μαυρομιχάλης; born 5 March 1987, in Helsinki) is a Finnish reporter, presenter and actor, who played a young boy named Romeo Aro in the Finnish soap series Salatut elämät from 2006-2008.. Romeo will return to the show in 2026. Mavromichalis' father is Greek, and both Finnish and Greek are spoken at his home. Mavromichalis matriculated from the high school of Kallio in spring 2006.
