= Meeri Koutaniemi =

Finnish photographer and journalist

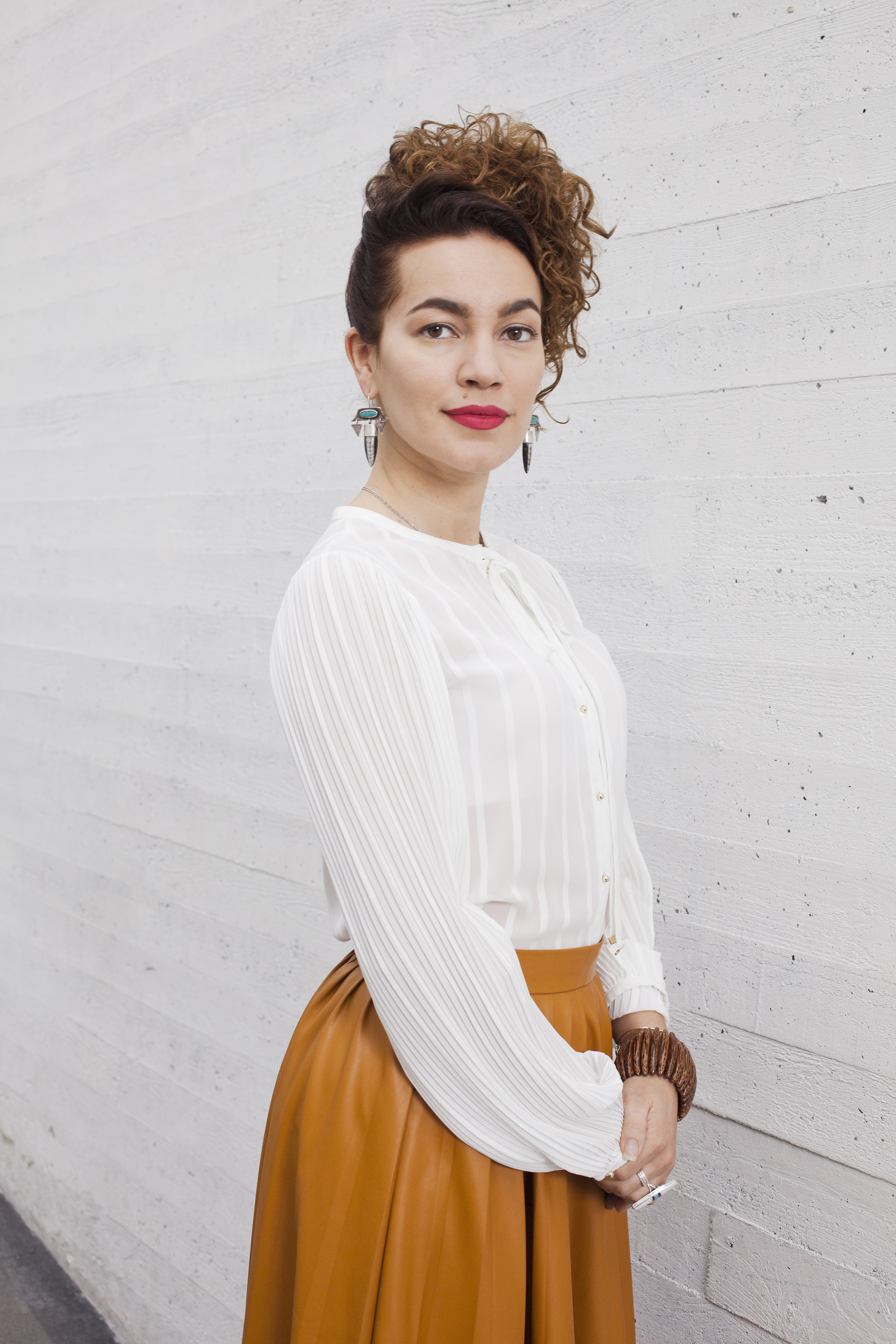
- Meeri Koutaniemi in Kiasma, February 2016.
- Born: 1 November 1987 (age 38); Kuusamo, Finland
- Education: Tampere University
- Known for: Photography.

Meeri Koutaniemi (born 1987) is a Finnish photographer and journalist. Koutaniemi is known for her reportages and portraits on issues concerning human rights, minorities and empowerment.

== Biography ==
Koutaniemi was born in Kuusamo. After completing comprehensive school, she moved from Kuusamo to Oulu to study theatre in upper secondary school. After living six months in Oulu she moved to Helsinki, where she studied music and dance at The Sibelius Upper Secondary School. She has studied photojournalism at The University of Tampere.

Since 2011, Koutaniemi has been travelling and working around the world, such as in Southeast Asia, Africa and Latin America.

Koutaniemi is a founder member of an Italian Photo Agency Echo and Finnish Collective 11.

Koutaniemi is partly of Romani descent, and according to a DNA test she took in 2018, she also has Central Asian and Eskimo ancestry.

== Acknowledgements and criticism ==
Koutaniemi has won several awards in Annual Press Photo Competition by Finnish Press Photographers’ Association. In 2012, she won the portrait of the year award. In 2013, Koutaniemi won six categories in Annual Press Photo Competition: photographer of the year, multimedia of the year, photo of the year, foreign reportage of the year, portrait of the year and people's choice. In 2014, she won in two categories: photographer of the year and foreign reportage of the year.

In 2014, Koutaniemi won the Visa D'or Daily Press Award in Visa pour l’Image in Perpignan, France, and Freelens Award in Lumix Photo Festival in Hannover, (Germany) with her reportage about female genital mutilation of two maasai girls. Reportage was published in a Finnish newspaper Helsingin Sanomat in 2014 and it provoked a lot of discussion. UNICEF Finland was among those who criticised the publishing of the series in the media, but the photographs received an honourable mention at the Photo of the Year competition organised by UNICEF Germany. Reportage was also published in Time article.

== Books ==
- 2020 Vahvaksi rikotut, Siltala
- 2017 Sami Yaffan Maailma, LIKE
- 2017 Ilopangon naiset, LIKE
- 2016 Fintiaanien mailla, WSOY
- 2015 Sisu, PS-kustannus
- 2015 Riisuttu Suomi, Docendo
- 2013 Oasis, Musta Taide

== Awards ==
- 2017 The Maker of the Future, Culture Gala, Finland
- 2017 People's Choice, Photo Journalist of the Year, Finnish Press Photos, Finland
- 2015 2. Price, Best Photostory, Siena International Photo Awards, Italy
- 2015 Winner, PDN, The Marty Forscher Fellowship Professional Award, USA
- 2014 Honorable Mention / Pictures of the Year, UNICEF, Germany
- 2014 Shortlisted Winners, VIPA international Awards, Austria
- 2014 Winner, Visa D'or Daily Press Award, Visa pour l’Image, France
- 2014 Winner, FreeLens Award, Lumix Photo Festival, Germany
- 2014 Winner, Photographer of the Year, Annual Press Photo Competition, Finland
- 2014 Winner, Foreign Reportage of the Year, Annual Press Photo Competition, Finland
- 2013 Carina Appel Memorial Award, Finland
- 2013 Winner, Photographer of the Year, Annual Press Photo Competition, Finland
- 2013 Winner, Multimedia of the Year, Annual Press Photo Competition, Finland
- 2013 Winner, Photo of the Year, Annual Press Photo Competition, Finland
- 2013 Winner, Foreign Reportage of the Year, Annual Press Photo Competition, Finland
- 2013 Winner, Portrait of the Year, Annual Press Photo Competition, Finland
- 2013 People's Choice, Portrait of the Year, Annual Press Photo Competition, Finland
- 2012 Tim Hetherington Memorial Award, USA
- 2012 Winner, Portrait of the Year, Annual Press Photo Competition, Finland
- 2012 Honor Mention, Foreign Reportage, Annual Press Photo Competition, Finland

== Personal life ==
Since March 2016, Koutaniemi has been dating the rock musician Sami Yaffa. They announced their relationship in July 2016, got engaged in July 2017 and married in September 2017 on Majorca, Spain.
