= Levikset repee =

Sini Sabotage song

Single by Sini Sabotage featuring VilleGalle

from the album 22 m²
- Released: 19 April 2013
- Recorded: 2013
- Genre: Rap
- Length: 3:21
- Label: Warner Music Finland & PME Records
- Songwriters: Ville-Petteri Galle, Perttu Mäkelä, Sini Sabotage Jaakko Salovaara
- Producers: DJPP, Jaakko Salovaara

Sini Sabotage singles chronology
"Sanaton" (2012)	"Levikset repee" (2013)	"Miks" (2013)

Music video
- "Levikset repee" on YouTube

"Levikset repee" is a song by Finnish rapper Sini Sabotage featuring VilleGalle from her debut album 22 m². The song was released as a single on 19 April 2013, and in May it peaked at number one on the Finnish Singles Chart.

== Chart performance ==
Chart	Peak position
Finland (Suomen virallinen lista)	1
