= Sini Sabotage =

Finnish rapper

- Also known as: Sini
- Born: Sini-Maria Makkonen; 22 February 1986 (age 40); Jokela, Finland
- Genre: Rap
- Instrument: Vocals
- Labels: PME Records, Warner Music Finland

Sini-Maria Makkonen (born 22 February 1986), professionally known as Sini Sabotage, is a Finnish rapper.

== Career ==
Sini Sabotage started her career by appearing as a featured artist on albums by Cheek and JVG and by doing DJ gigs. In 2013, she was signed to PME Records, founded by JVG, and released her breakthrough single "Levikset repee" in April. The song peaked at number one on the Finnish Singles Chart.

Sini Sabotage served as one of the judges on the sixth season of the Finnish television show Idols in 2013. Her debut album 22 m² was released on 5 December 2013.

On 10 January 2024, she was announced as one of the participants of Uuden Musiikin Kilpailu 2024, the Finnish national final for the Eurovision Song Contest 2024, with the song "Kuori mua".

== Discography ==
=== Albums ===
Year	Title	Peak position
Year	Title	FIN
2013	22 m²	27
2020	Blueberry Makkonen	26

=== Singles ===
Year	Title	Peak position
Year	Title	FIN
2012	"Sanaton"	–
2013	"Levikset repee" (featuring VilleGalle)	1
2013	"Miks"	14
2024	"Kuori mua"	12

=== As a featured artist ===
Year	Artist	Song	Album
2009	Cheek	"Fresh" as Sini	Jare Henrik Tiihonen
2012	JVG	"Sun stiflat"	jvg.fi
