= Eno, Finland =

Former municipality of Finland, now part of Joensuu

Coordinates: 62°48′N 30°09′E

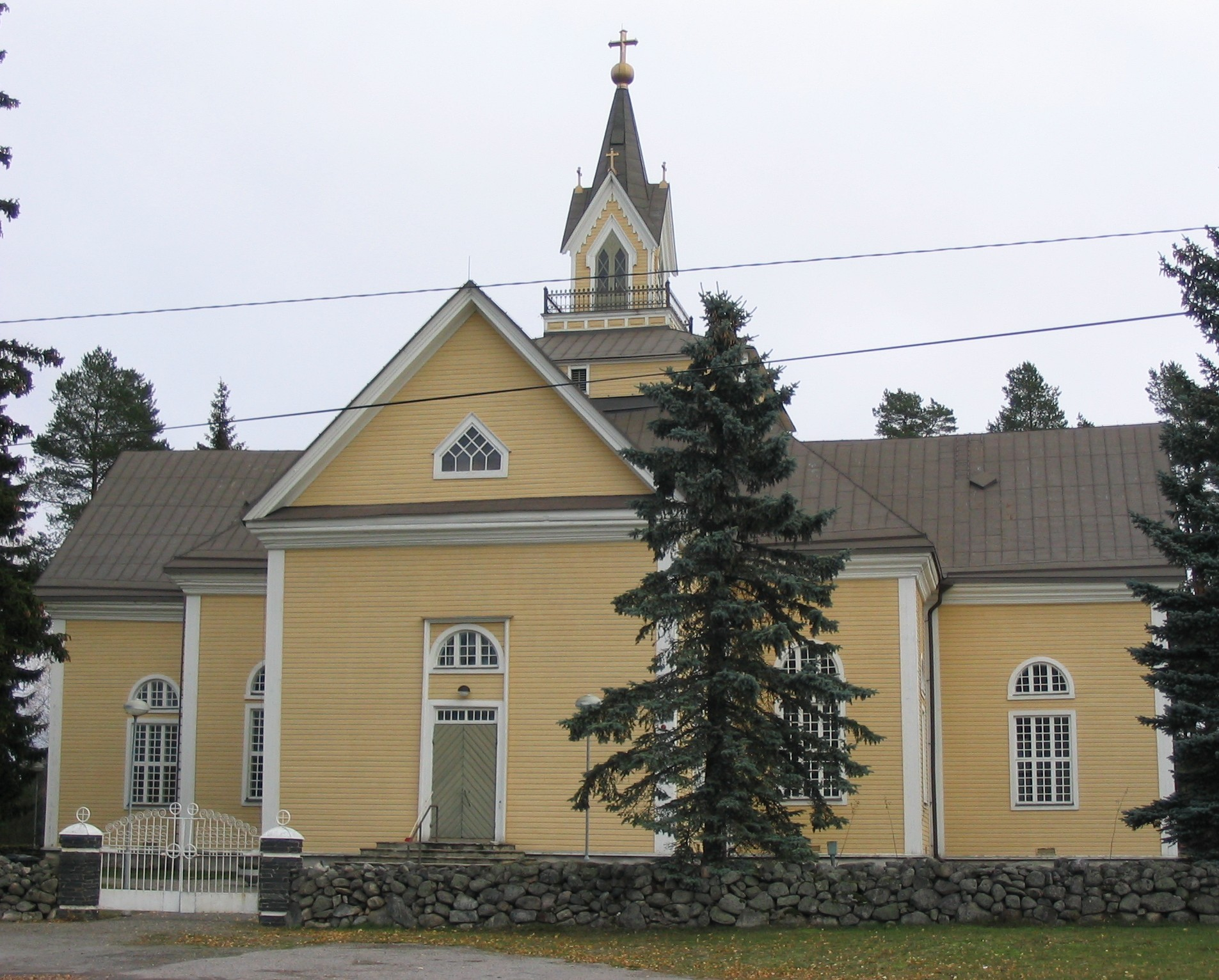
The Lutheran church of Eno

Eno is a former municipality of Finland, now part of Joensuu. It is located in the province of Eastern Finland and is part of the North Karelia region. The municipality had a population of 6,764 (as of January 1, 2006) and covered an area of 1,088.25 km^{2} of which 149.30 km^{2} was water. The population density was 6.2 inhabitants per km^{2}.

Eno railway station is the first station north of Joensuu on the railway between Joensuu and Nurmes.

The municipality was unilingually Finnish. The name Eno comes from the Karelian word, which means the center of the river, where the water flows most strongly. The beaver of the coat of arms on the triple hill refers to Majoinvaara in Eno, and the ax carried on its shoulder symbolizes deforestation and forestry. The coat of arms was designed by Ahti Hammar and approved by Eno's municipal council at its meeting on November 22, 1954. The coat of arms was approved for use by the Ministry of the Interior on April 15, 1955.

Eno was consolidated with Joensuu on January 1, 2009.

== Notable people ==
- Kari Tykkyläinen (born 1953), sculptor and video artist

== See also ==
- Koli National Park
