= Kaija Juurikkala =

Finnish film director and screenwriter

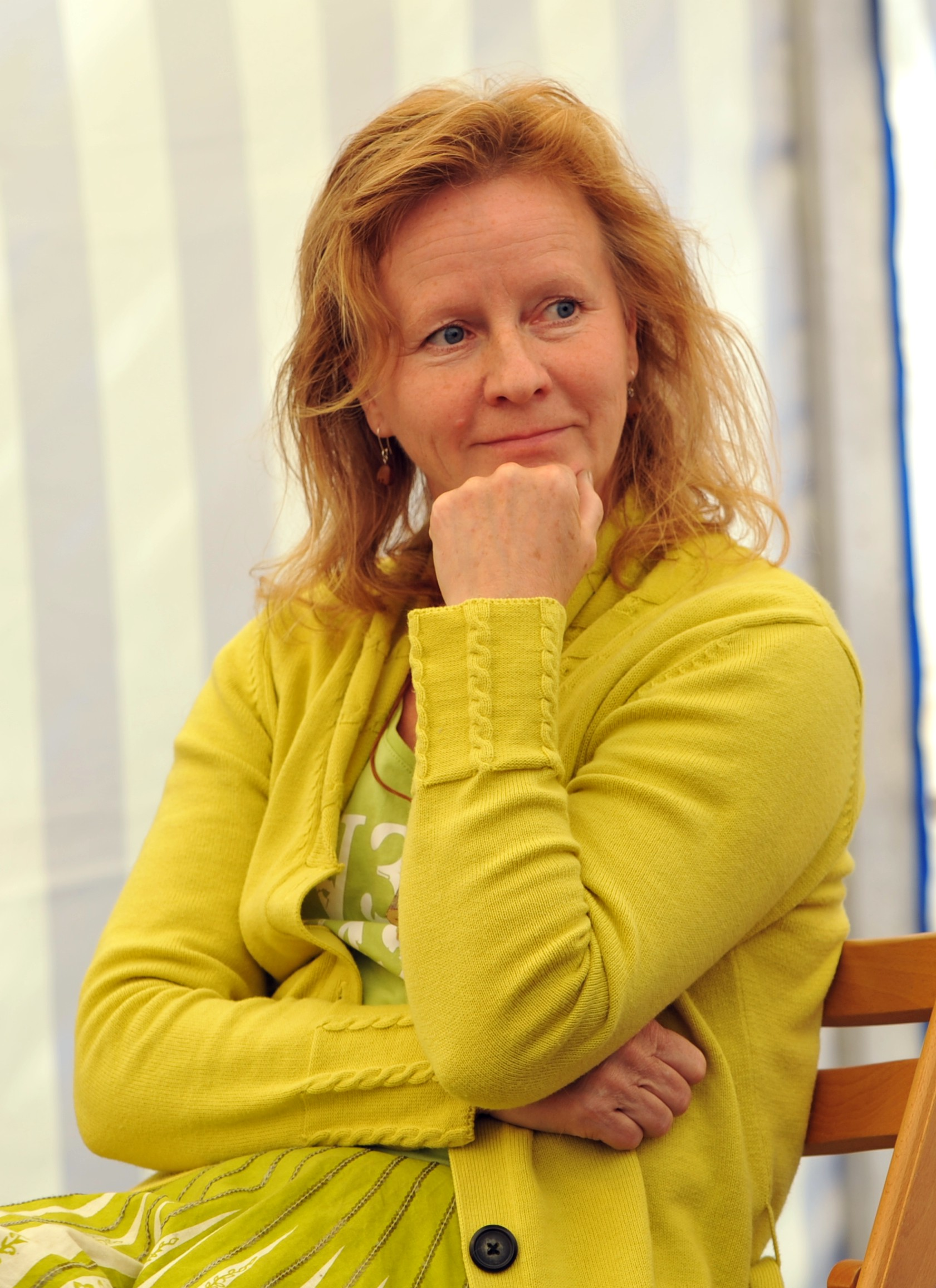
- Juurikkala in May 2011
- Born: 20 November 1959 (age 66); Finland
- Occupations: Film director, screenwriter
- Spouse: Juha Juurikkala
- Children: 2

Kaija Juurikkala (born 20 November 1959) is a Finnish film director and screenwriter. She has studied film directing at the University of Art and Design Helsinki. Juurikkala has directed mainly films aimed at young people.

Rosa Was Here (1994) is a half-length fiction film about a world where all adults suddenly disappear. The beetroot has also directed two long films. The Ride To Moses (2001) is based on the Ten Commandments of the Bible. It consists of ten different stories that young people aged between 12 and 15 were impoverished throughout Finland. Valo (2005) is a film based on Aleksanteri Ahola-Valo's diaries and a root story of Juurikkala, whose actual script was written by Markku Flink.

Juurikkala has also directed the television series "Enkeleitä ja pikkupiruja" (Angels and Little Pigs) (1998) and Laura (2002). Autobiographical work has appeared in the root sector Varjojen taika – matka edelliseen elämään (2011), which she tells her faith in the afterlife. In 2014, she appeared on her mother book, telling her about her role as a mother of her own family and newborn children.

In 2000, Juurikkala was awarded the Vantaa Culture Prize. In 2003, Juurikkala was awarded the State Prize for Cinematography and the Unicef Award for Children's Rights in 2005.

== Private life ==
Juurikala is married to Juha Juurikkala. Kaija Juurikkala is in her second marriage. She has two adult sons, Ville and Oskari.
