= Jannika B =

Finnish singer

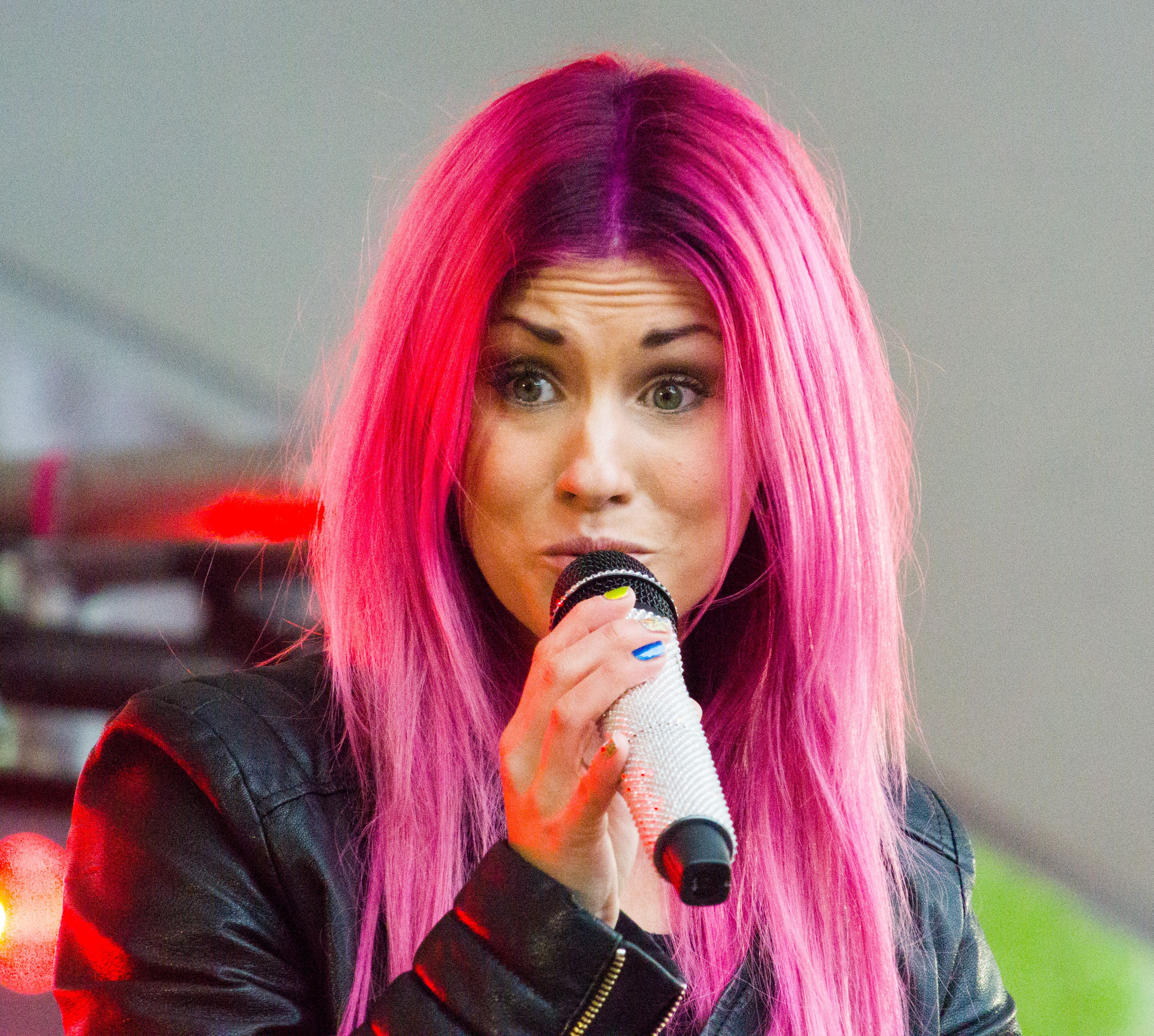

Background information
- Born: Jannika Bergroth; 28 February 1985 (age 41); Finland
- Genres: Pop
- Years active: 2007–present
- Label: Capitol/ Universal Music
- Website: www.jannikab.com

Jannika Ona Elisabeth Wirtanen (née Bergroth) (born 28 February 1985) better known as Jannika B is a Finnish singer and songwriter. Her professional music career began when she took part in the music competition Idols in 2007 and 2008, followed by the Finnish X Factor in 2009.

After a few appearances on Finland's Swedish-language station Yle Radio Vega, she debuted her Finnish-language single "Kuin kynsi lakattu" in 2009. Her first studio album was released in 2013 titled Kaikki rohkeus. In February 2012, she had founded her own independent record label Ona with distribution agreements with Sony Music.

Jannika B participated in Tanssii tähtien kanssa, the Finnish version of Strictly Come Dancing on MTV3 during the autumn season of 2019, and reached second place in a field of 10 participating Finnish celebrities.

== Discography ==
=== Albums ===
Year	Album	Chart peak FIN
2013	Kaikki rohkeus	3
2014	Šiva	6
2019	Toinen nainen	5

=== Singles ===
Year	Single	Chart peak FIN	Album
2011	"Onnenpäivä"	–	Kaikki rohkeus
2012	"Hulluksi onnesta"	–	Kaikki rohkeus
2012	"Seuraavaan elämään"	20	Kaikki rohkeus
2013	"Pohjanmaan"	–	Kaikki rohkeus
2013	"Tarttuu muhun"	–	Kaikki rohkeus
2014	"Jääkausi"	–	Siva
2014	"Itseni herra"	–	Siva
2014	"Siva"	–	Siva
2016	"Niagara"	–	–
2016	"Skumppalaulu"	–	–
2017	"Sudenhetkellä"	–	–
2017	"Vantaan kokoinen yksinäisyys"	–	Toinen nainen
2017	"Riisu kokonaan"	–	Toinen nainen
2018	"En luovu susta koskaan"	–	Toinen nainen
2018	"Kaksi jotka pelkää"	–	Toinen nainen
2020	"Katso mua"	–	–
2020	"Pyyntö"	1	Kausi 11 ensimmäinen kattaus
2022	"Mania"	18	–
2023	"Paras osa"	45	–
